= Electoral results for the Division of Kingston =

Australian division election results

This is a list of electoral results for the Division of Kingston in Australian federal elections from the division's creation in 1949 until the present.

== Members ==
Member	Party	Term
Jim Handby	Liberal	1949–1951
Pat Galvin	Labor	1951–1966
Kay Brownbill	Liberal	1966–1969
Dr Richard Gun	Labor	1969–1975
Grant Chapman	Liberal	1975–1983
Gordon Bilney	Labor	1983–1996
Susan Jeanes	Liberal	1996–1998
David Cox	Labor	1998–2004
Kym Richardson	Liberal	2004–2007
Amanda Rishworth	Labor	2007–present

== Election results ==
=== Elections in the 2020s ===
==== 2025 ====
2025 Australian federal election: Kingston
Party	Candidate	Votes	%	±%
Labor	Amanda Rishworth			
One Nation	Nathan Skrlj			
Greens	John Photakis			
Liberal	Jim Rishworth			
Family First	Steven Price			
Trumpet of Patriots	Russell Patrick Jackson			
Animal Justice	Bin Liu			
Total formal votes				
Informal votes				
Turnout				

==== 2022 ====
2022 Australian federal election: Kingston
Party	Candidate	Votes	%	±%
Labor	Amanda Rishworth	53,810	49.20	−1.38
Liberal	Kathleen Bourne	28,273	25.85	−5.87
Greens	John Photakis	13,603	12.44	+3.24
One Nation	Robert Godfrey-Brown	5,313	4.86	+4.86
United Australia	Russell Jackson	4,321	3.95	−1.02
Independent	Rob De Jonge	2,963	2.71	+2.71
Federation	Sam Enright	1,079	0.99	+0.99
Total formal votes		109,362	96.19	+0.30
Informal votes		4,336	3.81	−0.30
Turnout		113,698	91.37	−1.80
Two-party-preferred result
Labor	Amanda Rishworth	72,564	66.35	+4.41
Liberal	Kathleen Bourne	36,798	33.65	−4.41
Labor hold		Swing	+4.41	

Alluvial diagram for preference flows in the seat of Kingston in the 2022 federal election. indicates at what stage the winning candidate had over 50% of the votes and was declared the winner.

=== Elections in the 2010s ===
==== 2019 ====
2019 Australian federal election: Kingston
Party	Candidate	Votes	%	±%
Labor	Amanda Rishworth	53,655	50.58	+5.22
Liberal	Laura Curran	33,650	31.72	+5.60
Greens	Nikki Mortier	9,764	9.20	+3.36
United Australia	Jodie Hoskin	5,270	4.97	+4.97
Animal Justice	Kellie Somers	3,742	3.53	+3.27
Total formal votes		106,081	95.89	−0.25
Informal votes		4,547	4.11	+0.25
Turnout		110,628	93.17	+1.31
Two-party-preferred result
Labor	Amanda Rishworth	65,708	61.94	−1.61
Liberal	Laura Curran	40,373	38.06	+1.61
Labor hold		Swing	−1.61	

==== 2016 ====
2016 Australian federal election: Kingston
Party	Candidate	Votes	%	±%
Labor	Amanda Rishworth	46,151	49.42	+0.16
Liberal	Kelvin Binns	21,772	23.31	−9.09
Xenophon	Damian Carey	16,059	17.20	+17.20
Greens	Robyn Holtham	5,361	5.74	−1.15
Family First	Geoff Doecke	4,048	4.33	−1.55
Total formal votes		93,391	96.27	+1.34
Informal votes		3,617	3.73	−1.34
Turnout		97,008	91.79	−2.01
Two-party-preferred result
Labor	Amanda Rishworth	62,616	67.05	+7.35
Liberal	Kelvin Binns	30,775	32.95	−7.35
Labor hold		Swing	+7.35	

==== 2013 ====
2013 Australian federal election: Kingston
Party	Candidate	Votes	%	±%
Labor	Amanda Rishworth	43,328	49.26	−2.50
Liberal	Damien Mills	28,492	32.40	+3.99
Greens	Palitja Moore	6,062	6.89	−5.22
Family First	Geoff Doecke	5,168	5.88	+0.08
Palmer United	Mitchell Frost	3,709	4.22	+4.22
Rise Up Australia	Andy Snoswell	1,191	1.35	+1.35
Total formal votes		87,950	94.93	+0.09
Informal votes		4,697	5.07	−0.09
Turnout		92,647	93.80	−0.53
Two-party-preferred result
Labor	Amanda Rishworth	52,504	59.70	−4.85
Liberal	Damien Mills	35,446	40.30	+4.85
Labor hold		Swing	−4.85	

==== 2010 ====
2010 Australian federal election: Kingston
Party	Candidate	Votes	%	±%
Labor	Amanda Rishworth	46,882	51.05	+4.40
Liberal	Chris Zanker	26,652	29.02	−10.72
Greens	Palitja Moore	11,264	12.27	+6.60
Family First	Geoff Doecke	5,288	5.76	+0.05
Democrats	Ron Baker	1,748	1.90	+0.95
Total formal votes		91,834	94.91	−1.36
Informal votes		4,925	5.09	+1.36
Turnout		96,759	94.59	−1.38
Two-party-preferred result
Labor	Amanda Rishworth	58,695	63.91	+9.49
Liberal	Chris Zanker	33,139	36.09	−9.49
Labor hold		Swing	+9.49	

=== Elections in the 2000s ===
==== 2007 ====
2007 Australian federal election: Kingston
Party	Candidate	Votes	%	±%
Labor	Amanda Rishworth	42,212	46.65	+4.36
Liberal	Kym Richardson	35,961	39.74	−3.85
Family First	Robert Brokenshire	5,169	5.71	+0.07
Greens	Bill Weller	5,132	5.67	+0.37
Democrats	Matthew Fowler	859	0.95	−1.21
Independent	Barry Becker	505	0.56	+0.56
Independent	Alex Kusznir	380	0.42	+0.42
Liberty & Democracy	Lachlan Smith	273	0.30	+0.30
Total formal votes		90,491	96.27	+2.04
Informal votes		3,505	3.73	−2.04
Turnout		93,996	96.00	+0.69
Two-party-preferred result
Labor	Amanda Rishworth	49,247	54.42	+4.49
Liberal	Kym Richardson	41,244	45.58	−4.49
Labor gain from Liberal		Swing	+4.49	

==== 2004 ====
2004 Australian federal election: Kingston
Party	Candidate	Votes	%	±%
Liberal	Kym Richardson	36,848	43.59	+3.82
Labor	David Cox	35,748	42.29	+3.41
Family First	Andrew Cole	4,767	5.64	+5.64
Greens	Yvonne Darlington	4,478	5.30	+1.96
Democrats	Deirdre Albrighton	1,825	2.16	−9.70
One Nation	Laurel Payne	869	1.03	−3.59
Total formal votes		84,535	94.23	−0.26
Informal votes		5,178	5.77	+0.26
Turnout		89,713	95.31	−0.23
Two-party-preferred result
Liberal	Kym Richardson	42,327	50.07	+1.42
Labor	David Cox	42,208	49.93	−1.42
Liberal gain from Labor		Swing	+1.42	

==== 2001 ====
2001 Australian federal election: Kingston
Party	Candidate	Votes	%	±%
Labor	David Cox	31,127	40.17	+0.66
Liberal	Dean Hersey	30,080	38.82	+0.56
Democrats	Graham Pratt	9,076	11.71	+2.22
One Nation	Charlie McCormack	3,634	4.69	−4.59
Greens	Deborah Guildner	2,437	3.14	+3.14
No GST	Gordon Arandelovic	1,136	1.47	+1.47
Total formal votes		77,490	94.50	−0.81
Informal votes		4,511	5.50	+0.81
Turnout		82,001	96.59	
Two-party-preferred result
Labor	David Cox	40,618	52.42	+0.54
Liberal	Dean Hersey	36,872	47.58	−0.54
Labor hold		Swing	+0.54	

=== Elections in the 1990s ===
==== 1998 ====
1998 Australian federal election: Kingston
Party	Candidate	Votes	%	±%
Liberal	Susan Jeanes	32,211	39.45	−3.44
Labor	David Cox	31,441	38.51	−1.04
Democrats	Graham Pratt	7,725	9.46	−0.49
One Nation	Charlie McCormack	7,510	9.20	+9.20
Independent	Olive Weston	980	1.20	+1.20
Independent	Ralph Hahnheuser	869	1.06	+1.06
Independent EFF	Chris Planeta	513	0.63	+0.63
Natural Law	Hugh Dickson	400	0.49	+0.08
Total formal votes		81,649	95.34	−0.17
Informal votes		3,989	4.66	+0.17
Turnout		85,638	96.22	−0.41
Two-party-preferred result
Labor	David Cox	41,206	50.47	+2.48
Liberal	Susan Jeanes	40,443	49.53	−2.48
Labor gain from Liberal		Swing	+2.48	

==== 1996 ====
1996 Australian federal election: Kingston
Party	Candidate	Votes	%	±%
Liberal	Susan Jeanes	34,023	42.89	+0.85
Labor	Gordon Bilney	31,372	39.55	−4.90
Democrats	Debbie Webb	7,890	9.95	+2.23
Greens	David Nurton	1,852	2.33	+2.33
Against Further Immigration	Evonne Moore	1,780	2.24	+2.24
Independent	Paula Newell	1,004	1.27	+1.27
Independent	John Watson	443	0.56	+0.56
Independent	Bob Campbell	381	0.48	+0.48
Natural Law	Sally Ann Hunter	327	0.41	−0.87
Independent	Patrick Muldowney	249	0.31	+0.31
Total formal votes		79,321	95.51	−0.94
Informal votes		3,726	4.49	+0.94
Turnout		83,047	96.64	+0.78
Two-party-preferred result
Liberal	Susan Jeanes	41,056	52.01	+3.46
Labor	Gordon Bilney	37,881	47.99	−3.46
Liberal gain from Labor		Swing	+3.46	

==== 1993 ====
1993 Australian federal election: Kingston
Party	Candidate	Votes	%	±%
Labor	Gordon Bilney	33,906	44.45	+7.45
Liberal	Martin Gordon	32,073	42.04	+7.76
Democrats	Anji Gesserit	5,885	7.71	−17.51
Call to Australia	John Watson	1,917	2.51	+0.13
Natural Law	Robert Brown	976	1.28	+1.28
Independent	Alexa Jamieson	908	1.19	+1.19
Independent	Egils Burtmanis	427	0.56	+0.56
	Robert Graham	194	0.25	+0.25
Total formal votes		76,286	96.45	+0.00
Informal votes		2,806	3.55	+0.00
Turnout		79,092	95.86	
Two-party-preferred result
Labor	Gordon Bilney	39,212	51.45	−2.85
Liberal	Martin Gordon	37,000	48.55	+2.85
Labor hold		Swing	−2.85	

==== 1990 ====
1990 Australian federal election: Kingston
Party	Candidate	Votes	%	±%
Labor	Gordon Bilney	26,206	37.1	−11.2
Liberal	Judy Fuller	23,355	33.0	−5.5
Democrats	Janine Haines	18,694	26.4	+17.1
Call to Australia	Cliff Boyd	1,533	2.2	+2.2
Independent	George Gater	327	0.5	+0.5
Independent	Lyall McDonald	304	0.4	+0.4
Democratic Socialist	Tom Flanagan	296	0.4	+0.4
Total formal votes		70,715	96.6	
Informal votes		2,507	3.4	
Turnout		73,222	96.6	
Two-party-preferred result
Labor	Gordon Bilney	38,824	55.0	+0.2
Liberal	Judy Fuller	31,722	45.0	−0.2
Labor hold		Swing	+0.2	

=== Elections in the 1980s ===
==== 1987 ====
1987 Australian federal election: Kingston
Party	Candidate	Votes	%	±%
Labor	Gordon Bilney	30,138	48.3	−2.4
Liberal	Richard Noble	23,997	38.5	+2.8
Democrats	Colin Miller	5,819	9.3	+0.7
National	Gerald Larkin	1,874	3.0	+2.0
Unite Australia	Michael Prowse	539	0.9	+0.9
Total formal votes		62,367	93.6	
Informal votes		4,231	6.4	
Turnout		66,598	95.0	
Two-party-preferred result
Labor	Gordon Bilney	34,157	54.8	−2.6
Liberal	Richard Noble	28,203	45.2	+2.6
Labor hold		Swing	−2.6	

==== 1984 ====
1984 Australian federal election: Kingston
Party	Candidate	Votes	%	±%
Labor	Gordon Bilney	29,140	50.7	−1.4
Liberal	Richard Noble	20,546	35.7	−6.0
Democrats	Robert Ralph	4,951	8.6	+2.3
Nuclear Disarmament	Paul Breakwell	2,270	3.9	+3.9
National	Neville Agars	584	1.0	+1.0
Total formal votes		57,491	91.5	
Informal votes		5,308	8.5	
Turnout		62,799	95.3	
Two-party-preferred result
Labor	Gordon Bilney	32,965	57.4	+2.2
Liberal	Richard Noble	24,514	42.6	−2.2
Labor hold		Swing	+2.2	

==== 1983 ====
1983 Australian federal election: Kingston
Party	Candidate	Votes	%	±%
Labor	Gordon Bilney	40,019	50.0	+5.3
Liberal	Grant Chapman	35,057	43.8	−2.5
Democrats	Robert Ralph	5,038	6.3	−2.7
Total formal votes		80,114	98.2	
Informal votes		1,488	1.8	
Turnout		81,602	95.5	
Two-party-preferred result
Labor	Gordon Bilney	42,568	53.1	+3.3
Liberal	Grant Chapman	37,546	46.9	−3.3
Labor gain from Liberal		Swing	+3.3	

==== 1980 ====
1980 Australian federal election: Kingston
Party	Candidate	Votes	%	±%
Liberal	Grant Chapman	35,069	46.3	+1.0
Labor	Richard Gun	33,822	44.7	+2.8
Democrats	Judith Jenkins	6,813	9.0	−3.8
Total formal votes		75,704	98.1	
Informal votes		1,485	1.9	
Turnout		77,189	95.8	
Two-party-preferred result
Liberal	Grant Chapman	38,034	50.2	−1.6
Labor	Richard Gun	37,670	49.8	+1.6
Liberal hold		Swing	−1.6	

=== Elections in the 1970s ===
==== 1977 ====
1977 Australian federal election: Kingston
Party	Candidate	Votes	%	±%
Liberal	Grant Chapman	31,254	45.3	−3.0
Labor	Richard Gun	28,919	41.9	+0.0
Democrats	Christopher Harte	8,810	12.8	+12.8
Total formal votes		68,983	97.6	
Informal votes		1,697	2.4	
Turnout		70,680	96.2	
Two-party-preferred result
Liberal	Grant Chapman	35,732	51.8	−4.8
Labor	Richard Gun	33,251	48.2	+4.8
Liberal hold		Swing	−4.8	

==== 1975 ====
1975 Australian federal election: Kingston
Party	Candidate	Votes	%	±%
Liberal	Grant Chapman	34,893	48.3	+12.5
Labor	Richard Gun	30,296	41.9	−11.0
Liberal Movement	Rodney Adam	6,412	8.9	−1.2
Workers	Verna Oakley	696	1.0	+1.0
Total formal votes		72,297	98.0	
Informal votes		1,469	2.0	
Turnout		73,766	96.7	
Two-party-preferred result
Liberal	Grant Chapman	40,932	56.6	+12.7
Labor	Richard Gun	31,365	43.4	−12.7
Liberal gain from Labor		Swing	+12.7	

==== 1974 ====
1974 Australian federal election: Kingston
Party	Candidate	Votes	%	±%
Labor	Richard Gun	35,647	52.9	+1.0
Liberal	Peter Tonkin	24,117	35.8	−8.4
Liberal Movement	Peter Heysen	6,771	10.1	+10.1
Australia	Janet Veilands	833	1.2	+1.2
Total formal votes		67,368	98.1	
Informal votes		1,281	1.9	
Turnout		68,649	96.8	
Two-party-preferred result
Labor	Richard Gun		56.1	+3.4
Liberal	Peter Tonkin		43.9	−3.4
Labor hold		Swing	+3.4	

==== 1972 ====
1972 Australian federal election: Kingston
Party	Candidate	Votes	%	±%
Labor	Richard Gun	30,169	51.9	−1.5
Liberal	Peter Tonkin	25,657	44.2	+1.3
Democratic Labor	Mark Posa	2,251	3.9	+0.2
Total formal votes		58,077	98.3	
Informal votes		1,005	1.7	
Turnout		59,082	96.4	
Two-party-preferred result
Labor	Richard Gun		52.7	−1.2
Liberal	Peter Tonkin		47.3	+1.2
Labor hold		Swing	−1.2	

=== Elections in the 1960s ===
==== 1969 ====
1969 Australian federal election: Kingston
Party	Candidate	Votes	%	±%
Labor	Richard Gun	26,975	53.4	+17.0
Liberal	Kay Brownbill	21,687	42.9	−14.9
Democratic Labor	Betty Bishop	1,886	3.7	−2.1
Total formal votes		50,548	97.9	
Informal votes		1,060	2.1	
Turnout		51,608	96.7	
Two-party-preferred result
Labor	Richard Gun		53.9	+16.5
Liberal	Kay Brownbill		46.1	−16.5
Labor gain from Liberal		Swing	+16.5	

==== 1966 ====
1966 Australian federal election: Kingston
Party	Candidate	Votes	%	±%
Liberal	Kay Brownbill	35,041	53.4	+11.7
Labor	Pat Galvin	26,764	40.8	−12.8
Democratic Labor	Allan Anderson	3,776	5.8	+1.1
Total formal votes		65,581	98.1	
Informal votes		1,300	1.9	
Turnout		66,881	96.8	
Two-party-preferred result
Liberal	Kay Brownbill		58.2	+12.7
Labor	Pat Galvin		41.8	−12.7
Liberal gain from Labor		Swing	+12.7	

==== 1963 ====
1963 Australian federal election: Kingston
Party	Candidate	Votes	%	±%
Labor	Pat Galvin	32,582	53.6	−2.6
Liberal	Kay Brownbill	25,375	41.7	+6.6
Democratic Labor	Brian Crowe	2,858	4.7	−4.0
Total formal votes		60,815	98.8	
Informal votes		752	1.2	
Turnout		61,567	97.1	
Two-party-preferred result
Labor	Pat Galvin		54.5	−4.2
Liberal	Kay Brownbill		45.5	+4.2
Labor hold		Swing	−4.2	

==== 1961 ====
1961 Australian federal election: Kingston
Party	Candidate	Votes	%	±%
Labor	Pat Galvin	32,279	56.2	+5.4
Liberal	John McCoy	20,144	35.1	−7.5
Democratic Labor	Brian Crowe	5,026	8.7	+2.1
Total formal votes		57,449	97.8	
Informal votes		1,316	2.2	
Turnout		58,765	96.4	
Two-party-preferred result
Labor	Pat Galvin		58.7	+6.6
Liberal	John McCoy		41.3	−6.6
Labor hold		Swing	+6.6	

=== Elections in the 1950s ===
==== 1958 ====
1958 Australian federal election: Kingston
Party	Candidate	Votes	%	±%
Labor	Pat Galvin	25,607	50.8	−0.8
Liberal	Cecil Anderson	21,442	42.6	−5.8
Democratic Labor	Brian Crowe	3,321	6.6	+6.6
Total formal votes		50,370	97.5	
Informal votes		1,292	2.5	
Turnout		51,662	96.8	
Two-party-preferred result
Labor	Pat Galvin		52.1	+0.5
Liberal	Cecil Anderson		47.9	−0.5
Labor hold		Swing	+0.5	

==== 1955 ====
1955 Australian federal election: Kingston
Party	Candidate	Votes	%	±%
Labor	Pat Galvin	21,429	51.6	−4.0
Liberal	Jim Forbes	20,129	48.4	+4.0
Total formal votes		41,558	96.7	
Informal votes		1,414	3.3	
Turnout		42,972	96.5	
Labor hold		Swing	−4.0	

==== 1954 ====
1954 Australian federal election: Kingston
Party	Candidate	Votes	%	±%
Labor	Pat Galvin	31,602	55.0	+4.4
Liberal	Howard Zelling	25,88	45.0	−3.1
Total formal votes		57,490	98.6	
Informal votes		830	1.4	
Turnout		58,320	97.1	
Labor hold		Swing	+3.2	

==== 1951 ====
1951 Australian federal election: Kingston
Party	Candidate	Votes	%	±%
Labor	Pat Galvin	24,834	50.6	+2.2
Liberal	Jim Handby	23,614	48.1	−0.3
Communist	Eric Stead	654	1.3	+1.3
Total formal votes		49,102	98.1	
Informal votes		966	1.9	
Turnout		50,068	97.2	
Two-party-preferred result
Labor	Pat Galvin		51.8	+3.4
Liberal	Jim Handby		48.2	−3.4
Labor gain from Liberal		Swing	+3.4	

=== Elections in the 1940s ===
==== 1949 ====
1949 Australian federal election: Kingston
Party	Candidate	Votes	%	±%
Liberal	Jim Handby	23,713	51.6	+9.3
Labor	Thomas Sheehy	22,233	48.4	−7.6
Total formal votes		45,946	97.8	
Informal votes		1,057	2.2	
Turnout		47,003	97.1	
Liberal notional gain from Labor		Swing	+8.4	
