= 1966 Australian House of Representatives election =

This is a list of electoral division results for the Australian 1966 federal election.

== Overall ==
This section is an excerpt from 1966 Australian federal election § Results

House of Reps (IRV) — 1966–69—Turnout 95.13% (CV) — Informal 3.10%
Party	Votes	%	Swing	Seats	Change
Liberal–Country coalition	2,853,890	49.98	+3.94	82	+10
Liberal	2,291,964	40.14	+3.05	61	+9
Country	561,926	9.84	+0.90	21	+1
Labor	2,282,834	39.98	–5.49	41	–9
Democratic Labor	417,411	7.31	–0.13	0	0
Liberal Reform	49,610	0.87	+0.87	0	0
Communist	23,056	0.40	–0.19	0	0
Independents	82,948	1.45	+0.98	1	+1
Total	5,709,749			124	+2
Two-party-preferred (estimated)
Liberal–Country coalition	Win	56.90	+4.30	82	+10
Labor		43.10	−4.30	41	−9

Independents: Sam Benson

Popular vote
Liberal	40.14%
Labor	39.98%
Country	9.84%
DLP	7.31%
Independents	1.45%
Other	1.27%

Two-party-preferred vote
Coalition	56.90%
Labor	43.10%

Parliament seats
Coalition	66.13%
Labor	33.06%
Independents	0.81%

== New South Wales ==
1966 Australian federal election (New South Wales)
← 1963	26 November 1966	1969 →

All 46 NSW seats in the House of Representatives 23 seats needed for a majority
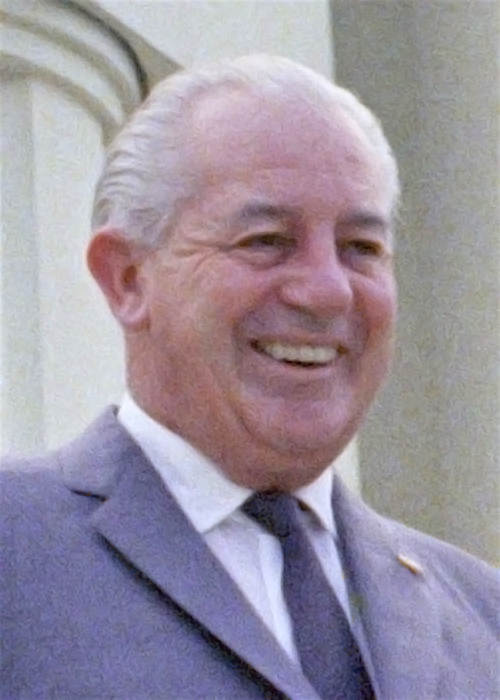

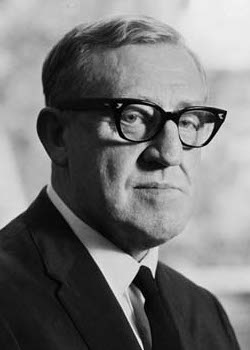
	First party	Second party
Leader	Harold Holt	Arthur Calwell
Party	Coalition	Labor
Seats before	26	20
Seats won	29	17
Seat change	▲3	▼3
Popular vote	1,088,762	862,631
Percentage	52.4%	40.7%
Swing	▲4.7pp	▼6.9pp
TPP	56.1%	43.9%
TPP swing	▲5.4pp	▼5.4pp

=== Banks ===
This section is an excerpt from Electoral results for the Division of Banks § 1966

1966 Australian federal election: Banks
Party	Candidate	Votes	%	±%
Labor	Eric Costa	28,748	47.5	−8.7
Liberal	Herman Tibben	27,349	45.2	+6.2
Democratic Labor	Norma Boyle	2,866	4.7	−8.7
Communist	Harry Hatfield	1,563	2.6	−2.3
Total formal votes		60,526	95.7	
Informal votes		2,697	4.3	
Turnout		63,223	95.9	
Two-party-preferred result
Labor	Eric Costa	31,974	52.8	−7.9
Liberal	Herman Tibben	28,552	47.2	+7.9
Labor hold		Swing	−7.9	

=== Barton ===
This section is an excerpt from Electoral results for the Division of Barton § 1966

1966 Australian federal election: Barton
Party	Candidate	Votes	%	±%
Liberal	Bill Arthur	23,089	49.6	+2.9
Labor	Len Reynolds	21,818	46.9	−3.1
Democratic Labor	Phillip Kennedy	1,252	2.7	−0.6
Independent	Charles Bellchambers	371	0.8	+0.8
Total formal votes		46,530	97.5	
Informal votes		1,188	2.5	
Turnout		47,718	96.4	
Two-party-preferred result
Liberal	Bill Arthur	24,289	52.2	+2.9
Labor	Len Reynolds	22,241	47.8	−2.9
Liberal gain from Labor		Swing	+4.6	

=== Bennelong ===
This section is an excerpt from Electoral results for the Division of Bennelong § 1966

1966 Australian federal election: Bennelong
Party	Candidate	Votes	%	±%
Liberal	Sir John Cramer	31,239	59.3	+1.8
Labor	Geoffrey O'Donnell	14,987	28.4	−8.9
Liberal Reform Group	Robert Turner	3,808	7.2	+7.2
Democratic Labor	Edward Connolly	2,672	5.1	+0.5
Total formal votes		52,706	97.2	
Informal votes		1,525	2.8	
Turnout		54,231	94.6	
Two-party-preferred result
Liberal	Sir John Cramer		65.4	+3.9
Labor	Geoffrey O'Donnell		34.6	−3.9
Liberal hold		Swing	+3.9	

=== Blaxland ===
This section is an excerpt from Electoral results for the Division of Blaxland § 1966

1966 Australian federal election: Blaxland
Party	Candidate	Votes	%	±%
Labor	Jim Harrison	24,924	55.8	−5.2
Liberal	Robert Lovell	17,411	39.0	+6.4
Democratic Labor	Terence Keenan	2,299	5.2	−1.2
Total formal votes		44,634	96.6	
Informal votes		1,582	3.4	
Turnout		46,216	94.4	
Two-party-preferred result
Labor	Jim Harrison		56.8	−6.3
Liberal	Robert Lovell		43.2	+6.3
Labor hold		Swing	−6.3	

=== Bradfield ===
This section is an excerpt from Electoral results for the Division of Bradfield § 1966

1966 Australian federal election: Bradfield
Party	Candidate	Votes	%	±%
Liberal	Harry Turner	44,317	78.4	+0.4
Labor	William Bramwell	8,698	15.4	−0.6
Democratic Labor	Allan Dwyer	3,533	6.2	+0.2
Total formal votes		56,548	97.9	
Informal votes		1,191	2.1	
Turnout		57,739	95.0	
Two-party-preferred result
Liberal	Harry Turner		83.4	+1.4
Labor	William Bramwell		16.6	−1.4
Liberal hold		Swing	+1.4	

=== Calare ===
This section is an excerpt from Electoral results for the Division of Calare § 1966

1966 Australian federal election: Calare
Party	Candidate	Votes	%	±%
Country	John England	25,200	62.6	+8.3
Labor	William Stavert	11,985	29.8	−7.6
Democratic Labor	John Grant	3,053	7.6	−0.6
Total formal votes		40,238	97.8	
Informal votes		886	2.2	
Turnout		41,124	95.6	
Two-party-preferred result
Country	John England		68.7	+7.6
Labor	William Stavert		31.3	−7.6
Country hold		Swing	+7.6	

=== Cowper ===
This section is an excerpt from Electoral results for the Division of Cowper § 1966

1966 Australian federal election: Cowper
Party	Candidate	Votes	%	±%
Country	Ian Robinson	24,602	63.5	+10.5
Labor	Burwood Gillett	13,044	33.7	−13.3
Liberal Reform Group	William Tredinnick	1,076	2.8	+2.8
Total formal votes		38,722	98.3	
Informal votes		680	1.7	
Turnout		39,402	96.7	
Two-party-preferred result
Country	Ian Robinson		64.2	+11.2
Labor	Burwood Gillett		35.8	−11.2
Country hold		Swing	+11.2	

=== Cunningham ===
This section is an excerpt from Electoral results for the Division of Cunningham § 1966

1966 Australian federal election: Cunningham
Party	Candidate	Votes	%	±%
Labor	Rex Connor	31,986	54.5	−3.9
Liberal	John Poel	23,473	40.0	+1.8
Independent	Victor Kearney	1,951	3.3	+3.3
Communist	Reg Wilding	977	1.7	−1.7
Independent	Jeffrey Fenton	354	0.6	+0.6
Total formal votes		58,741	96.6	
Informal votes		2,066	3.4	
Turnout		60,807	95.8	
Two-party-preferred result
Labor	Rex Connor		58.0	−3.5
Liberal	John Poel		42.0	+3.5
Labor hold		Swing	−3.5	

=== Dalley ===
This section is an excerpt from Electoral results for the Division of Dalley § 1966

1966 Australian federal election: Dalley
Party	Candidate	Votes	%	±%
Labor	William O'Connor	18,938	61.0	−11.9
Liberal	Elton Lewis	9,709	31.3	+31.3
Democratic Labor	John Kavanagh	2,377	7.7	−19.4
Total formal votes		31,024	95.1	
Informal votes		1,615	4.9	
Turnout		32,639	93.4	
Two-party-preferred result
Labor	William O'Connor		62.3	−10.6
Liberal	Elton Lewis		37.7	+37.7
Labor hold		Swing	−10.6	

=== Darling ===
This section is an excerpt from Electoral results for the Division of Darling § 1966

1966 Australian federal election: Darling
Party	Candidate	Votes	%	±%
Labor	Joe Clark	20,848	60.3	−7.1
Liberal	Allan Connell	13,714	39.7	+39.7
Total formal votes		34,562	97.5	
Informal votes		900	2.5	
Turnout		35,462	93.5	
Labor hold		Swing	−7.1	

=== East Sydney ===
This section is an excerpt from Electoral results for the Division of East Sydney § 1966

1966 Australian federal election: East Sydney
Party	Candidate	Votes	%	±%
Labor	Len Devine	15,004	52.9	−8.3
Liberal	William Berman	10,636	37.5	+4.4
Democratic Labor	Mel Antcliff	1,807	6.4	+6.4
Communist	Bill Brown	940	3.3	−2.4
Total formal votes		28,387	94.3	
Informal votes		1,731	5.7	
Turnout		30,118	90.3	
Two-party-preferred result
Labor	Len Devine		57.0	−9.4
Liberal	William Berman		43.0	+9.4
Labor hold		Swing	−9.4	

=== Eden-Monaro ===
This section is an excerpt from Electoral results for the Division of Eden-Monaro § 1966

1966 Australian federal election: Eden-Monaro
Party	Candidate	Votes	%	±%
Labor	Allan Fraser	19,875	47.7	−3.3
Liberal	Dugald Munro	17,024	40.8	−3.5
Country	Tony Pratten	3,618	8.7	+8.7
Democratic Labor	John Mills	1,177	2.8	−1.9
Total formal votes		41,694	97.6	
Informal votes		1,005	2.4	
Turnout		42,699	95.1	
Two-party-preferred result
Liberal	Dugald Munro	21,159	50.7	+3.4
Labor	Allan Fraser	20,535	49.3	−3.4
Liberal gain from Labor		Swing	+3.4	

=== Evans ===
This section is an excerpt from Electoral results for the Division of Evans § 1966

1966 Australian federal election: Evans
Party	Candidate	Votes	%	±%
Liberal	Malcolm Mackay	20,342	55.1	+4.0
Labor	James Monaghan	12,857	34.9	−7.1
Democratic Labor	Francis Collins	2,071	5.6	−0.4
Liberal Reform Group	John Gunn	1,619	4.4	+4.4
Total formal votes		36,889	96.5	
Informal votes		1,327	3.5	
Turnout		38,216	93.7	
Two-party-preferred result
Liberal	Malcolm Mackay		61.8	+5.2
Labor	James Monaghan		38.2	−5.2
Liberal hold		Swing	+5.2	

=== Farrer ===
This section is an excerpt from Electoral results for the Division of Farrer § 1966

1966 Australian federal election: Farrer
Party	Candidate	Votes	%	±%
Liberal	David Fairbairn	28,700	66.6	+7.7
Labor	Alan Thomson	10,151	23.5	−8.3
Democratic Labor	James Keogh	4,271	9.9	+0.6
Total formal votes		43,122	98.1	
Informal votes		830	1.9	
Turnout		43,952	96.0	
Two-party-preferred result
Liberal	David Fairbairn		75.5	+9.0
Labor	Alan Thomson		24.5	−9.0
Liberal hold		Swing	+9.0	

=== Grayndler ===
This section is an excerpt from Electoral results for the Division of Grayndler § 1966

1966 Australian federal election: Grayndler
Party	Candidate	Votes	%	±%
Labor	Fred Daly	17,247	59.0	−5.5
Liberal	Basil Mottershead	10,070	34.5	+1.7
Democratic Labor	Lyle Antcliff	1,895	6.5	+6.5
Total formal votes		29,212	95.3	
Informal votes		1,433	4.7	
Turnout		30,645	92.9	
Two-party-preferred result
Labor	Fred Daly		61.1	−5.8
Liberal	Basil Mottershead		38.9	+5.8
Labor hold		Swing	−5.8	

=== Gwydir ===
This section is an excerpt from Electoral results for the Division of Gwydir § 1966

1966 Australian federal election: Gwydir
Party	Candidate	Votes	%	±%
Country	Ian Allan	25,184	61.3	+6.3
Labor	Reginald Lang	15,895	38.7	−6.3
Total formal votes		41,079	98.2	
Informal votes		740	1.8	
Turnout		41,819	94.7	
Country hold		Swing	+6.3	

=== Hughes ===
This section is an excerpt from Electoral results for the Division of Hughes § 1966

1966 Australian federal election: Hughes
Party	Candidate	Votes	%	±%
Liberal	Don Dobie	37,647	49.9	+5.1
Labor	Les Johnson	35,793	47.5	−4.6
Democratic Labor	William Goslett	1,989	2.6	+0.2
Total formal votes		75,429	98.1	
Informal votes		1,463	1.9	
Turnout		76,892	95.8	
Two-party-preferred result
Liberal	Don Dobie	39,188	52.0	+4.7
Labor	Les Johnson	36,241	48.0	−4.7
Liberal gain from Labor		Swing	+4.7	

=== Hume ===
This section is an excerpt from Electoral results for the Division of Hume § 1966

1966 Australian federal election: Hume
Party	Candidate	Votes	%	±%
Country	Ian Pettitt	19,435	50.5	+22.0
Labor	John Menadue	16,189	42.1	−4.0
Democratic Labor	John Hogan	2,825	7.3	+0.7
Total formal votes		38,449	98.4	
Informal votes		607	1.6	
Turnout		39,056	96.4	
Two-party-preferred result
Country	Ian Pettitt		55.5	+4.7
Labor	John Menadue		44.5	−4.7
Country hold		Swing	+4.7	

=== Hunter ===
This section is an excerpt from Electoral results for the Division of Hunter § 1966

1966 Australian federal election: Hunter
Party	Candidate	Votes	%	±%
Labor	Bert James	33,037	71.9	+0.8
Liberal	William Gilchrist	9,044	19.7	+3.0
Democratic Labor	Donald Richards	3,839	8.4	+0.9
Total formal votes		45,920	96.1	
Informal votes		1,856	3.9	
Turnout		47,776	96.2	
Two-party-preferred result
Labor	Bert James		73.6	−4.0
Liberal	William Gilchrist		26.4	+4.0
Labor hold		Swing	−4.0	

=== Kingsford Smith ===
This section is an excerpt from Electoral results for the Division of Kingsford Smith § 1966

1966 Australian federal election: Kingsford-Smith
Party	Candidate	Votes	%	±%
Labor	Dan Curtin	21,859	50.5	−4.3
Liberal	Nancy Wake	19,268	44.5	+3.3
Democratic Labor	Cornelius Woodbury	2,193	5.1	+5.1
Total formal votes		43,320	96.7	
Informal votes		1,477	3.3	
Turnout		44,797	93.7	
Two-party-preferred result
Labor	Dan Curtin		51.5	−6.9
Liberal	Nancy Wake		48.5	+6.9
Labor hold		Swing	−6.9	

=== Lang ===
This section is an excerpt from Electoral results for the Division of Lang § 1966

1966 Australian federal election: Lang
Party	Candidate	Votes	%	±%
Labor	Frank Stewart	22,417	50.6	−6.6
Liberal	Graham Crawford	19,432	43.9	+4.8
Democratic Labor	Bernard Atkinson	2,450	5.5	+5.5
Total formal votes		44,299	97.0	
Informal votes		1,361	3.0	
Turnout		45,660	95.0	
Two-party-preferred result
Labor	Frank Stewart		51.5	−5.3
Liberal	Graham Crawford		48.5	+5.3
Labor hold		Swing	−5.3	

=== Lawson ===
This section is an excerpt from Electoral results for the Division of Lawson § 1966

1966 Australian federal election: Lawson
Party	Candidate	Votes	%	±%
Country	Laurie Failes	21,649	56.5	+3.5
Labor	John Canobi	14,399	37.6	−4.4
Democratic Labor	Mario Morandini	2,239	5.8	+0.8
Total formal votes		38,287	98.3	
Informal votes		668	1.7	
Turnout		38,955	95.3	
Two-party-preferred result
Country	Laurie Failes		61.1	+2.6
Labor	John Canobi		38.9	−2.6
Country hold		Swing	+2.6	

=== Lowe ===
This section is an excerpt from Electoral results for the Division of Lowe § 1966

1966 Australian federal election: Lowe
Party	Candidate	Votes	%	±%
Liberal	William McMahon	21,595	58.5	+2.9
Labor	Peter Dunn	12,687	34.4	−5.1
Liberal Reform Group	Francis James	1,485	4.0	+4.0
Democratic Labor	Anthony Rooney	1,147	3.1	−1.8
Total formal votes		36,914	97.5	
Informal votes		958	2.5	
Turnout		37,872	94.7	
Two-party-preferred result
Liberal	William McMahon		62.3	+2.8
Labor	Peter Dunn		37.7	−2.8
Liberal hold		Swing	+2.8	

=== Lyne ===
This section is an excerpt from Electoral results for the Division of Lyne § 1966

1966 Australian federal election: Lyne
Party	Candidate	Votes	%	±%
Country	Philip Lucock	27,822	64.4	+2.9
Labor	John Allan	13,537	31.3	−4.4
Independent	William Power	933	2.2	+2.2
Independent	Joe Cordner	923	2.1	−0.7
Total formal votes		43,215	97.6	
Informal votes		1,065	2.4	
Turnout		44,280	96.0	
Two-party-preferred result
Country	Philip Lucock		66.6	+3.7
Labor	John Allan		33.4	−3.7
Country hold		Swing	+3.7	

=== Macarthur ===
This section is an excerpt from Electoral results for the Division of Macarthur § 1966

1966 Australian federal election: Macarthur
Party	Candidate	Votes	%	±%
Liberal	Jeff Bate	39,004	60.9	+6.3
Labor	Patrick O'Halloran	22,753	35.5	−5.9
Democratic Labor	Albert Perish	1,270	2.0	−1.5
Independent	Ronald Sarina	510	0.8	+0.3
Independent	John Souter	484	0.8	+0.8
Total formal votes		64,021	97.0	
Informal votes		1,989	3.0	
Turnout		66,010	94.4	
Two-party-preferred result
Liberal	Jeff Bate		63.3	+5.6
Labor	Patrick O'Halloran		36.7	−5.6
Liberal hold		Swing	+5.6	

=== Mackellar ===
This section is an excerpt from Electoral results for the Division of Mackellar § 1966

1966 Australian federal election: Mackellar
Party	Candidate	Votes	%	±%
Liberal	Bill Wentworth	44,980	65.9	+3.7
Labor	Kenneth McLean	16,018	23.5	−6.8
Liberal Reform Group	Peter Allison	4,534	6.6	+6.6
Democratic Labor	Philip Cohen	2,699	4.0	−0.5
Total formal votes		68,231	96.9	
Informal votes		2,206	3.1	
Turnout		70,437	94.0	
Two-party-preferred result
Liberal	Bill Wentworth		70.9	+4.8
Labor	Kenneth McLean		29.1	−4.8
Liberal hold		Swing	+4.8	

=== Macquarie ===
This section is an excerpt from Electoral results for the Division of Macquarie § 1966

1966 Australian federal election: Macquarie
Party	Candidate	Votes	%	±%
Labor	Tony Luchetti	23,973	52.4	−5.2
Liberal	John Heesh	17,630	38.5	−3.9
Democratic Labor	Richard Ambrose	3,762	8.2	+8.2
Independent	Allan Fuary	372	0.8	+0.8
Total formal votes		45,737	97.2	
Informal votes		1,295	2.8	
Turnout		47,032	95.1	
Two-party-preferred result
Labor	Tony Luchetti		54.2	−3.4
Liberal	John Heesh		45.8	+3.4
Labor hold		Swing	−3.4	

=== Mitchell ===
This section is an excerpt from Electoral results for the Division of Mitchell § 1966

1966 Australian federal election: Mitchell
Party	Candidate	Votes	%	±%
Liberal	Les Irwin	48,570	54.3	+5.0
Labor	Peter McLoughlin	30,070	33.6	−10.8
Independent	William Murray	3,528	3.9	+3.9
Independent	Francis Bonnor	2,885	3.2	+3.2
Democratic Labor	Andrew Diehm	2,878	3.2	−0.5
Independent	Alan Jones	433	0.5	+0.5
Independent	Michael Deecke	414	0.5	+0.5
Independent	Dennis Rees	373	0.4	+0.4
Independent	Kevin Martin	318	0.4	+0.4
Total formal votes		89,469	95.1	
Informal votes		4,614	4.9	
Turnout		94,083	94.3	
Two-party-preferred result
Liberal	Les Irwin		61.8	+8.7
Labor	Peter McLoughlin		38.1	−8.7
Liberal hold		Swing	+8.7	

=== New England ===
This section is an excerpt from Electoral results for the Division of New England § 1966

1966 Australian federal election: New England
Party	Candidate	Votes	%	±%
Country	Ian Sinclair	28,245	69.3	+14.6
Labor	John Affleck	12,529	30.7	−11.4
Total formal votes		40,774	97.8	
Informal votes		904	2.2	
Turnout		41,678	95.7	
Country hold		Swing	+12.0	

=== Newcastle ===
This section is an excerpt from Electoral results for the Division of Newcastle1966

1966 Australian federal election: Newcastle
Party	Candidate	Votes	%	±%
Labor	Charles Jones	19,682	56.0	−2.7
Liberal	Frances Clack	12,000	34.2	−0.1
Democratic Labor	Jack Collins	2,054	5.8	−1.2
Independent	Warren Bridge	1,392	4.0	+4.0
Total formal votes		35,128	96.9	
Informal votes		1,136	3.1	
Turnout		36,264	95.6	
Two-party-preferred result
Labor	Charles Jones		58.7	−1.2
Liberal	Frances Clack		41.3	+1.2
Labor hold		Swing	−1.2	

=== North Sydney ===
This section is an excerpt from Electoral results for the Division of North Sydney § 1966

1966 Australian federal election: North Sydney
Party	Candidate	Votes	%	±%
Liberal	Bill Graham	21,477	59.8	+0.5
Labor	Jack Grahame	8,776	24.4	−11.0
Democratic Labor	Edmund Bateman	2,391	6.7	+1.3
Liberal Reform Group	Frederick Simpson	1,940	5.4	+5.4
Independent	Joyce Duncan	720	2.0	+2.0
Independent	Nicholas Gorshenin	391	1.1	+1.1
Independent	David Wall	161	0.4	+0.4
Independent	Romualds Kemps	62	0.2	+0.2
Total formal votes		35,918	95.5	
Informal votes		1,694	4.5	
Turnout		37,612	92.9	
Two-party-preferred result
Liberal	Bill Graham		68.6	+5.8
Labor	Jack Grahame		31.4	−5.8
Liberal hold		Swing	+5.8	

=== Parkes ===
This section is an excerpt from Electoral results for the Division of Parkes (1901–1969) § 1966

1966 Australian federal election: Parkes
Party	Candidate	Votes	%	±%
Liberal	Tom Hughes	19,196	51.2	+3.5
Labor	Doug Sutherland	14,843	39.6	−6.7
Liberal Reform Group	John Crew	2,364	6.3	+6.3
Democratic Labor	Kevin Davis	1,122	3.0	−3.0
Total formal votes		37,525	96.1	
Informal votes		1,505	3.9	
Turnout		39,030	94.0	
Two-party-preferred result
Liberal	Tom Hughes		55.9	+4.2
Labor	Doug Sutherland		44.1	−4.2
Liberal hold		Swing	+4.2	

=== Parramatta ===
This section is an excerpt from Electoral results for the Division of Parramatta § 1966

1966 Australian federal election: Parramatta
Party	Candidate	Votes	%	±%
Liberal	Nigel Bowen	33,087	56.8	+0.8
Labor	Barry Wilde	18,518	31.8	−6.7
Liberal Reform Group	Kenneth Cook	3,380	5.8	+5.8
Democratic Labor	Edward Beck	2,982	5.1	−0.4
Independent	Paul Nolan	322	0.6	+0.6
Total formal votes		58,289	97.1	
Informal votes		1,741	2.9	
Turnout		60,030	94.1	
Two-party-preferred result
Liberal	Nigel Bowen		62.8	+2.4
Labor	Barry Wilde		37.2	−2.4
Liberal hold		Swing	+2.4	

=== Paterson ===
This section is an excerpt from Electoral results for the Division of Paterson § 1966

1966 Australian federal election: Paterson
Party	Candidate	Votes	%	±%
Liberal	Allen Fairhall	25,437	63.0	+1.6
Labor	Francis Murray	12,045	29.8	−8.8
Democratic Labor	Aubrey Barr	2,889	7.2	+7.2
Total formal votes		40,371	97.7	
Informal votes		965	2.3	
Turnout		41,336	96.6	
Two-party-preferred result
Liberal	Allen Fairhall		69.0	+7.6
Labor	Francis Murray		31.0	−7.6
Liberal hold		Swing	+7.6	

=== Phillip ===
This section is an excerpt from Electoral results for the Division of Phillip § 1966

1966 Australian federal election: Phillip
Party	Candidate	Votes	%	±%
Liberal	William Aston	20,277	56.2	+8.5
Labor	Brian O'Kane	13,389	37.1	−9.3
Independent	John Hannan	1,228	3.4	+3.4
Democratic Labor	Dominique Droulers	1,159	3.2	−2.6
Total formal votes		36,053	96.7	
Informal votes		1,225	3.3	
Turnout		37,278	93.5	
Two-party-preferred result
Liberal	William Aston		60.5	+7.7
Labor	Brian O'Kane		39.5	−7.7
Liberal hold		Swing	+7.7	

=== Reid ===
This section is an excerpt from Electoral results for the Division of Reid § 1966

1966 Australian federal election: Reid
Party	Candidate	Votes	%	±%
Labor	Tom Uren	28,645	51.6	−6.7
Liberal	Stanislaus Kelly	21,089	38.0	+6.3
Democratic Labor	Mick Carroll	5,764	10.4	+0.4
Total formal votes		55,498	95.7	
Informal votes		2,492	4.3	
Turnout		57,990	94.4	
Two-party-preferred result
Labor	Tom Uren		53.5	−6.6
Liberal	Stanislaus Kelly		46.5	+6.6
Labor hold		Swing	−6.6	

=== Richmond ===
This section is an excerpt from Electoral results for the Division of Richmond § 1966

1966 Australian federal election: Richmond
Party	Candidate	Votes	%	±%
Country	Doug Anthony	26,030	65.9	−0.3
Independent	Keith Compton	8,407	21.3	+21.3
Labor	Ernest Jones	5,043	12.8	−19.4
Total formal votes		39,480	98.7	
Informal votes		504	1.3	
Turnout		39,984	95.3	
Two-party-preferred result
Country	Doug Anthony		67.2	+0.2
Independent	Keith Compton		32.8	+32.8
Country hold		Swing	+0.2	

=== Riverina ===
This section is an excerpt from Electoral results for the Division of Riverina § 1966

1966 Australian federal election: Riverina
Party	Candidate	Votes	%	±%
Country	Bill Armstrong	24,570	59.1	+7.4
Labor	Patrick Newman	9,803	23.6	−8.8
Labor	Arthur Solly	3,851	9.3	+9.3
Democratic Labor	Leslie Kennedy	3,373	8.1	+1.4
Total formal votes		41,597	97.7	
Informal votes		972	2.3	
Turnout		42,569	94.9	
Two-party-preferred result
Country	Bill Armstrong		66.5	+9.2
Labor	Patrick Newman		33.5	−9.2
Country hold		Swing	+9.2	

=== Robertson ===
This section is an excerpt from Electoral results for the Division of Robertson § 1966

1966 Australian federal election: Robertson
Party	Candidate	Votes	%	±%
Liberal	William Bridges-Maxwell	31,984	53.7	+3.2
Labor	William Smith	22,529	37.8	−6.7
Democratic Labor	Michael Dwyer	2,929	4.9	−0.1
Liberal Reform Group	Percival McPherson	2,112	3.5	+3.5
Total formal votes		59,554	97.3	
Informal votes		1,635	2.7	
Turnout		61,189	94.4	
Two-party-preferred result
Liberal	William Bridges-Maxwell		58.5	+4.4
Labor	William Smith		41.5	−4.4
Liberal hold		Swing	+4.4	

=== Shortland ===
This section is an excerpt from Electoral results for the Division of Shortland § 1966

1966 Australian federal election: Shortland
Party	Candidate	Votes	%	±%
Labor	Charles Griffiths	30,309	53.3	−7.3
Liberal	Malcolm Blackshaw	20,956	36.8	+9.5
Democratic Labor	Robert Burke	2,747	4.8	−4.4
Communist	Geoff Curthoys	1,600	2.8	−0.1
Independent	Stanley Millington	1,262	2.2	+2.2
Total formal votes		56,874	96.9	
Informal votes		1,803	3.1	
Turnout		58,677	96.4	
Two-party-preferred result
Labor	Charles Griffiths		57.9	−7.0
Liberal	Malcolm Blackshaw		42.1	+7.0
Labor hold		Swing	−7.0	

=== St George ===
This section is an excerpt from Electoral results for the Division of St George § 1966

1966 Australian federal election: St George
Party	Candidate	Votes	%	±%
Liberal	Len Bosman	22,091	54.5	+4.4
Labor	Malcolm Cameron	15,406	38.0	−9.1
Democratic Labor	Hans Andreasson	1,713	4.2	+1.4
Liberal Reform Group	John Mant	1,304	3.2	+3.2
Total formal votes		40,514	97.1	
Informal votes		1,229	2.9	
Turnout		41,743	95.9	
Two-party-preferred result
Liberal	Len Bosman		59.5	+7.2
Labor	Malcolm Cameron		40.5	−7.2
Liberal hold		Swing	+7.2	

=== Warringah ===
This section is an excerpt from Electoral results for the Division of Warringah § 1966

1966 Australian federal election: Warringah
Party	Candidate	Votes	%	±%
Liberal	Edward St John	26,387	60.2	−12.3
Labor	Jim McClelland	8,395	19.2	−3.7
Independent	Keith Chambers	6,806	15.5	+15.5
Democratic Labor	Francis Hicks	1,953	4.5	+0.0
Independent	Eric Riches	292	0.7	+0.7
Total formal votes		43,833	96.8	
Informal votes		1,444	3.2	
Turnout		45,277	93.1	
Two-party-preferred result
Liberal	Edward St John		77.2	+1.1
Labor	Jim McClelland		22.8	−1.1
Liberal hold		Swing	+1.1	

=== Watson ===
This section is an excerpt from Electoral results for the Division of Watson (1934–1969) § 1966

1966 Australian federal election: Watson
Party	Candidate	Votes	%	±%
Labor	Jim Cope	21,492	62.1	−6.0
Liberal	Peter Lowe	10,476	30.2	+6.9
Democratic Labor	Thomas Colman	2,664	7.7	+1.7
Total formal votes		34,632	95.6	
Informal votes		1,608	4.4	
Turnout		36,240	94.0	
Two-party-preferred result
Labor	Jim Cope		64.4	−8.1
Liberal	Peter Lowe		35.6	+8.1
Labor hold		Swing	−8.1	

=== Wentworth ===
This section is an excerpt from Electoral results for the Division of Wentworth § 1966

1966 Australian federal election: Wentworth
Party	Candidate	Votes	%	±%
Liberal	Les Bury	26,601	75.1	+2.0
Labor	Kerry Sibraa	6,471	18.3	−5.6
Democratic Labor	Doris Brown	1,489	4.2	+4.2
Independent	Brian King	527	1.5	+1.5
Communist	Jack Mundey	334	0.9	+0.9
Total formal votes		35,422	95.8	
Informal votes		1,539	4.2	
Turnout		36,961	91.4	
Two-party-preferred result
Liberal	Les Bury		79.5	+4.4
Labor	Kerry Sibraa		20.5	−4.4
Liberal hold		Swing	+4.4	

=== Werriwa ===
This section is an excerpt from Electoral results for the Division of Werriwa § 1966

1966 Australian federal election: Werriwa
Party	Candidate	Votes	%	±%
Labor	Gough Whitlam	45,345	55.0	−3.1
Liberal	Elga Rodze	30,198	36.6	−0.7
Communist	Les Kelton	4,411	5.3	+5.3
Democratic Labor	Andrew Murphy	2,539	3.1	−1.5
Total formal votes		82,493	94.9	
Informal votes		4,396	5.1	
Turnout		86,889	94.6	
Two-party-preferred result
Labor	Gough Whitlam		59.5	+0.5
Liberal	Elga Rodze		40.5	−0.5
Labor hold		Swing	+0.5	

=== West Sydney ===
This section is an excerpt from Electoral results for the Division of West Sydney § 1966

1966 Australian federal election: West Sydney
Party	Candidate	Votes	%	±%
Labor	Dan Minogue	15,823	61.8	−13.5
Liberal	Albert Curtin	6,908	27.0	+27.0
Democratic Labor	Denise Clancy	1,770	6.9	−11.1
Communist	Ron Maxwell	1,115	4.4	+4.4
Total formal votes		25,616	94.1	
Informal votes		1,593	5.9	
Turnout		27,209	91.4	
Two-party-preferred result
Labor	Dan Minogue		66.9	−11.2
Liberal	Albert Curtin		33.1	+33.1
Labor hold		Swing	−11.2	

== Victoria ==
1966 Australian federal election (Victoria)
← 1963	26 November 1966	1969 →

All 33 Victorian seats in the House of Representatives 17 seats needed for a majority
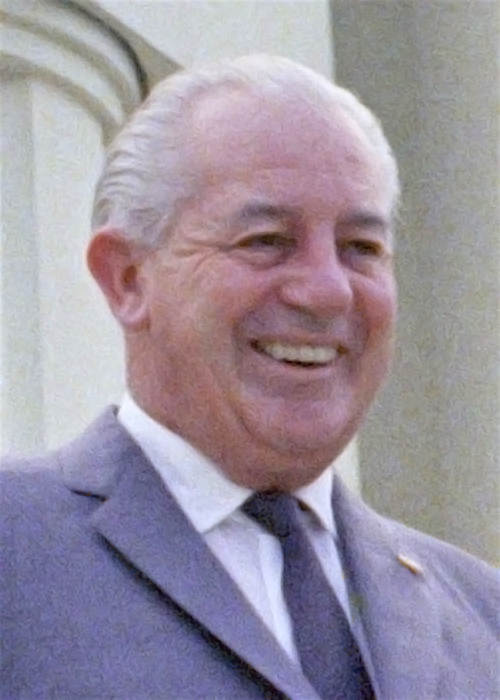

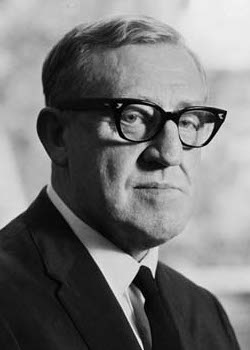
	First party	Second party
Leader	Harold Holt	Arthur Calwell
Party	Coalition	Labor
Seats before	23	10
Seats won	24	8
Seat change	▲1	▼2
Popular vote	753,176	548,743
Percentage	48.1%	35.1%
Swing	▲1.4pp	▼5.3pp
TPP	60.7%	39.3%
TPP swing	▲3.2pp	▼3.2pp

=== Balaclava ===
This section is an excerpt from Electoral results for the Division of Balaclava § 1966

1966 Australian federal election: Balaclava
Party	Candidate	Votes	%	±%
Liberal	Ray Whittorn	21,131	54.0	−4.8
Labor	Leo Richards	9,668	24.7	−4.9
Democratic Labor	Ralph James	5,552	14.2	+3.8
Liberal Reform Group	Brian McLure	2,762	7.1	+7.1
Total formal votes		39,113	96.9	
Informal votes		1,258	3.1	
Turnout		40,371	94.7	
Two-party-preferred result
Liberal	Ray Whittorn		67.7	−1.1
Labor	Leo Richards		32.3	+1.1
Liberal hold		Swing	−1.1	

=== Ballaarat ===
This section is an excerpt from Electoral results for the Division of Ballarat § 1966

1966 Australian federal election: Ballaarat
Party	Candidate	Votes	%	±%
Liberal	Dudley Erwin	21,288	49.4	+1.1
Labor	David Pollock	15,042	34.9	−1.9
Democratic Labor	Bob Joshua	6,729	15.6	+0.7
Total formal votes		43,059	97.9	
Informal votes		924	2.1	
Turnout		43,983	96.5	
Two-party-preferred result
Liberal	Dudley Erwin	27,491	63.8	+1.6
Labor	David Pollock	15,568	36.2	−1.6
Liberal hold		Swing	+1.6	

=== Batman ===
This section is an excerpt from Electoral results for the Division of Batman § 1966

1966 Australian federal election: Batman
Party	Candidate	Votes	%	±%
Labor	John Andersen	14,859	38.4	−10.4
Liberal	Bruce Skeggs	10,398	26.9	−9.8
Independent	Sam Benson	8,697	22.5	+22.5
Democratic Labor	Henry Darroch	3,592	9.3	−5.2
Liberal Reform Group	Robert Desailly	1,117	2.9	+2.9
Total formal votes		38,663	95.9	
Informal votes		1,668	4.1	
Turnout		40,331	95.5	
Two-party-preferred result
Independent	Sam Benson	22,342	57.8	+57.8
Labor	John Andersen	16,321	42.2	−8.7
Independent gain from Labor		Swing	+8.7	

=== Bendigo ===
This section is an excerpt from Electoral results for the Division of Bendigo § 1966

1966 Australian federal election: Bendigo
Party	Candidate	Votes	%	±%
Labor	Noel Beaton	23,191	51.7	+0.5
Liberal	Frank Dunphy	16,062	35.8	+0.7
Democratic Labor	Bill Drechsler	5,640	12.6	−1.1
Total formal votes		44,893	98.5	
Informal votes		697	1.5	
Turnout		45,590	96.2	
Two-party-preferred result
Labor	Noel Beaton		53.0	+0.4
Liberal	Frank Dunphy		47.0	−0.4
Labor hold		Swing	+0.4	

=== Bruce ===
This section is an excerpt from Electoral results for the Division of Bruce § 1966

1966 Australian federal election: Bruce
Party	Candidate	Votes	%	±%
Liberal	Billy Snedden	58,268	52.9	+4.5
Labor	Leslie Donnelly	32,410	29.4	−11.4
Democratic Labor	Henri de Sachau	13,242	12.0	+2.6
Liberal Reform Group	Herbert Wessley	4,188	3.8	+3.8
Communist	Ralph Gibson	1,467	1.3	+1.3
Independent	John Saunderson	526	0.5	+0.5
Total formal votes		110,101	96.1	
Informal votes		4,411	3.9	
Turnout		114,512	95.9	
Two-party-preferred result
Liberal	Billy Snedden		63.0	+5.6
Labor	Leslie Donnelly		37.0	−5.6
Liberal hold		Swing	+5.6	

=== Chisholm ===
This section is an excerpt from Electoral results for the Division of Chisholm § 1966

1966 Australian federal election: Chisholm
Party	Candidate	Votes	%	±%
Liberal	Sir Wilfrid Kent Hughes	22,556	58.5	−1.5
Labor	Kenneth Grigg	10,359	26.9	−2.6
Democratic Labor	Mary Stanley	4,199	10.9	+0.4
Independent	Clive Malseed	1,446	3.8	+3.8
Total formal votes		68,560	97.5	
Informal votes		988	2.5	
Turnout		39,548	95.8	
Two-party-preferred result
Liberal	Sir Wilfrid Kent Hughes		70.2	+0.7
Labor	Kenneth Grigg		29.8	−0.7
Liberal hold		Swing	+0.7	

=== Corangamite ===
This section is an excerpt from Electoral results for the Division of Corangamite § 1966

1966 Australian federal election: Corangamite
Party	Candidate	Votes	%	±%
Liberal	Tony Street	22,334	47.6	−9.9
Labor	Lindsay Romey	11,419	24.3	−4.8
Country	Gilbert Anderson	7,585	16.1	+16.1
Democratic Labor	Brian Cronin	5,634	12.0	−1.4
Total formal votes		46,972	97.6	
Informal votes		1,160	2.4	
Turnout		48,132	97.2	
Two-party-preferred result
Liberal	Tony Street		72.1	+2.5
Labor	Lindsay Romey		27.9	−2.5
Liberal hold		Swing	+2.5	

=== Corio ===
This section is an excerpt from Electoral results for the Division of Corio § 1966

1966 Australian federal election: Corio
Party	Candidate	Votes	%	±%
Liberal	Hubert Opperman	22,519	45.3	+1.3
Labor	Gordon Scholes	19,478	39.2	−6.4
Democratic Labor	James Mahoney	5,369	10.8	+0.4
Independent	Elsie Brushfield	1,262	2.5	+2.5
Liberal Reform Group	William Dobell	1,044	2.1	+2.1
Total formal votes		49,672	96.2	
Informal votes		1,940	3.8	
Turnout		51,612	95.9	
Two-party-preferred result
Liberal	Hubert Opperman	28,767	57.9	+4.6
Labor	Gordon Scholes	20,905	42.1	−4.6
Liberal hold		Swing	+4.6	

=== Darebin ===
This section is an excerpt from Electoral results for the Division of Darebin § 1966

1966 Australian federal election: Darebin
Party	Candidate	Votes	%	±%
Labor	Frank Courtnay	25,325	49.5	−5.9
Liberal	Noel Stubbs	15,601	30.5	+4.0
Democratic Labor	Tom Andrews	10,232	20.0	+1.8
Total formal votes		51,158	96.1	
Informal votes		2,073	3.9	
Turnout		53,231	96.1	
Two-party-preferred result
Labor	Frank Courtnay	29,258	57.2	+0.1
Liberal	Noel Stubbs	21,900	42.8	−0.1
Labor hold		Swing	+0.1	

=== Deakin ===
This section is an excerpt from Electoral results for the Division of Deakin § 1966

1966 Australian federal election: Deakin
Party	Candidate	Votes	%	±%
Liberal	Alan Jarman	39,183	50.0	−2.0
Labor	David McKenzie	25,039	31.9	−5.4
Democratic Labor	Maurice Weston	8,915	11.4	+0.7
Liberal Reform Group	Michael Degendorfer	5,284	6.7	+6.7
Total formal votes		78,421	97.2	
Informal votes		2,258	2.8	
Turnout		80,679	95.6	
Two-party-preferred result
Liberal	Alan Jarman		63.3	+1.7
Labor	David McKenzie		46.7	−1.7
Liberal hold		Swing	+1.7	

=== Fawkner ===
This section is an excerpt from Electoral results for the Division of Fawkner § 1966

1966 Australian federal election: Fawkner
Party	Candidate	Votes	%	±%
Liberal	Peter Howson	17,955	55.4	+0.9
Labor	Robert Vernon	8,883	27.4	−7.1
Democratic Labor	Yvonne Abolins	3,511	10.8	+2.6
Liberal Reform Group	George Gabriel	1,699	5.2	+5.2
Independent	Anthony Sanders	367	1.1	+1.1
Total formal votes		32,415	95.3	
Informal votes		1,586	4.7	
Turnout		34,001	92.5	
Two-party-preferred result
Liberal	Peter Howson		69.7	+6.1
Labor	Robert Vernon		30.3	−6.1
Liberal hold		Swing	+6.1	

=== Flinders ===
This section is an excerpt from Electoral results for the Division of Flinders § 1966

1966 Australian federal election: Flinders
Party	Candidate	Votes	%	±%
Liberal	Phillip Lynch	31,350	49.6	−2.6
Labor	Ian Boraston	24,067	37.9	+0.2
Democratic Labor	John Cass	6,171	9.6	−0.4
Independent	George Brunning	1,787	2.8	+2.8
Total formal votes		63,555	97.1	
Informal votes		1,882	2.9	
Turnout		65,437	95.4	
Two-party-preferred result
Liberal	Phillip Lynch		59.8	−1.5
Labor	Ian Boraston		40.2	+1.5
Liberal hold		Swing	−1.5	

=== Gellibrand ===
This section is an excerpt from Electoral results for the Division of Gellibrand § 1966

1966 Australian federal election: Gellibrand
Party	Candidate	Votes	%	±%
Labor	Hector McIvor	19,913	55.3	−8.9
Liberal	John McArthur	8,777	24.4	+3.4
Democratic Labor	Robin Thomas	4,426	12.3	+1.1
Communist	Ian Daykin	2,890	8.0	+4.4
Total formal votes		36,006	94.1	
Informal votes		2,274	5.9	
Turnout		38,280	95.9	
Two-party-preferred result
Labor	Hector McIvor		62.8	−5.9
Liberal	John McArthur		37.2	+5.9
Labor hold		Swing	−5.9	

=== Gippsland ===
This section is an excerpt from Electoral results for the Division of Gippsland § 1966

1966 Australian federal election: Gippsland
Party	Candidate	Votes	%	±%
Country	Peter Nixon	28,627	64.3	+6.5
Labor	Thomas Powell	9,478	21.3	−9.7
Democratic Labor	John Hansen	6,439	14.5	+3.2
Total formal votes		44,544	97.6	
Informal votes		1,090	2.4	
Turnout		45,634	95.7	
Two-party-preferred result
Country	Peter Nixon		77.5	+9.5
Labor	Thomas Powell		22.5	−9.5
Country hold		Swing	+9.5	

=== Henty ===
This section is an excerpt from Electoral results for the Division of Henty § 1966

1966 Australian federal election: Henty
Party	Candidate	Votes	%	±%
Liberal	Max Fox	23,072	49.9	−1.7
Labor	Maureen Campbell-Teich	18,053	39.0	+6.0
Democratic Labor	Henry Moore	5,114	11.1	+1.1
Total formal votes		46,239	97.2	
Informal votes		1,354	2.8	
Turnout		47,593	95.7	
Two-party-preferred result
Liberal	Max Fox	27,783	60.1	+0.8
Labor	Maureen Campbell-Teich	18,456	39.9	−0.8
Liberal hold		Swing	+0.8	

=== Higgins ===
This section is an excerpt from Electoral results for the Division of Higgins § 1966

1966 Australian federal election: Higgins
Party	Candidate	Votes	%	±%
Liberal	Harold Holt	23,918	63.3	+3.2
Labor	Bruce Phayer	9,510	25.2	−3.5
Democratic Labor	Frederick Skinner	4,370	11.6	+0.5
Total formal votes		37,798	97.2	
Informal votes		1,072	2.8	
Turnout		38,870	94.3	
Two-party-preferred result
Liberal	Harold Holt		73.7	+3.6
Labor	Bruce Phayer		26.3	−3.6
Liberal hold		Swing	+3.6	

=== Higinbotham ===
This section is an excerpt from Electoral results for the Division of Higinbotham § 1966

1966 Australian federal election: Higinbotham
Party	Candidate	Votes	%	±%
Liberal	Don Chipp	30,497	51.3	−0.4
Labor	Reginald Butler	18,667	31.4	−6.8
Democratic Labor	William Cameron	5,463	9.2	−0.9
Liberal Reform Group	John Little	3,251	5.5	+5.5
Republican	John A'Murray	1,561	2.6	+2.6
Total formal votes		59,439	96.9	
Informal votes		1,879	3.1	
Turnout		61,318	96.0	
Two-party-preferred result
Liberal	Don Chipp		61.8	+1.0
Labor	Reginald Butler		38.2	−1.0
Liberal hold		Swing	+1.0	

=== Indi ===
This section is an excerpt from Electoral results for the Division of Indi § 1966

1966 Australian federal election: Indi
Party	Candidate	Votes	%	±%
Country	Mac Holten	22,146	51.2	+3.2
Labor	William O'Neill	8,895	20.6	−5.1
Liberal	James Stewart	6,571	15.2	+0.9
Democratic Labor	Christopher Cody	5,614	13.0	+0.9
Total formal votes		43,226	97.1	
Informal votes		1,279	2.9	
Turnout		44,505	96.4	
Two-party-preferred result
Country	Mac Holten		76.7	+4.7
Labor	William O'Neill		23.3	−4.7
Country hold		Swing	+4.7	

=== Isaacs ===
This section is an excerpt from Electoral results for the Division of Isaacs (1949–1969) § 1966

1966 Australian federal election: Isaacs
Party	Candidate	Votes	%	±%
Liberal	William Haworth	18,468	54.0	+4.4
Labor	Peter Wilkinson	11,712	34.2	−5.7
Democratic Labor	John Hughes	4,032	11.8	+1.3
Total formal votes		34,212	95.2	
Informal votes		1,742	4.8	
Turnout		35,954	92.0	
Two-party-preferred result
Liberal	William Haworth		64.6	+5.5
Labor	Peter Wilkinson		35.4	−5.5
Liberal hold		Swing	+5.5	

=== Kooyong ===
This section is an excerpt from Electoral results for the Division of Kooyong § 1966

1966 Australian federal election: Kooyong
Party	Candidate	Votes	%	±%
Liberal	Andrew Peacock	28,760	61.2	−2.7
Labor	William Cooper	12,370	26.3	+1.9
Democratic Labor	Bernie Gaynor	5,888	12.5	+2.3
Total formal votes		47,018	97.9	
Informal votes		1,031	2.1	
Turnout		48,049	95.9	
Two-party-preferred result
Liberal	Andrew Peacock		72.5	−1.6
Labor	William Cooper		27.5	+1.6
Liberal hold		Swing	−1.6	

=== La Trobe ===
This section is an excerpt from Electoral results for the Division of La Trobe § 1966

1966 Australian federal election: La Trobe
Party	Candidate	Votes	%	±%
Liberal	John Jess	38,427	47.6	−1.1
Labor	Don Pritchard	26,847	33.3	−7.6
Democratic Labor	Kevin Adamson	10,311	12.8	+2.4
Liberal Reform Group	Leonard Weber	5,075	6.3	+6.3
Total formal votes		80,660	97.0	
Informal votes		2,471	3.0	
Turnout		83,131	95.6	
Two-party-preferred result
Liberal	John Jess	48,873	60.6	+3.8
Labor	Don Pritchard	31,787	39.4	−3.8
Liberal hold		Swing	+3.8	

=== Lalor ===
This section is an excerpt from Electoral results for the Division of Lalor § 1966

1966 Australian federal election: Lalor
Party	Candidate	Votes	%	±%
Labor	Reg Pollard	45,243	46.2	−8.2
Liberal	Mervyn Lee	29,211	29.8	+1.3
Democratic Labor	Jim Marmion	13,706	14.0	−3.1
Independent	Paul de Tert	6,914	7.1	+7.1
Liberal Reform Group	Victor Parsons	1,568	1.6	+1.6
Independent	Michael Wood	681	0.7	+0.7
Independent	Peter Spencer	592	0.6	+0.6
Total formal votes		97,915	91.2	
Informal votes		9,480	8.8	
Turnout		107,395	95.0	
Two-party-preferred result
Liberal	Mervyn Lee	49,650	50.7	+7.7
Labor	Reg Pollard	48,265	49.3	−7.7
Liberal gain from Labor		Swing	+7.7	

=== Mallee ===
This section is an excerpt from Electoral results for the Division of Mallee § 1966

1966 Australian federal election: Mallee
Party	Candidate	Votes	%	±%
Country	Winton Turnbull	26,041	66.9	+3.8
Labor	Hibbe Draaisma	6,857	17.6	−9.1
Democratic Labor	John Carty	6,034	15.5	+5.3
Total formal votes		38,932	97.5	
Informal votes		1,011	2.5	
Turnout		39,943	96.7	
Two-party-preferred result
Country	Winton Turnbull		80.0	+8.7
Labor	Hibbe Draaisma		20.0	−8.7
Country hold		Swing	+8.7	

=== Maribyrnong ===
This section is an excerpt from Electoral results for the Division of Maribyrnong § 1966

1966 Australian federal election: Maribyrnong
Party	Candidate	Votes	%	±%
Liberal	Philip Stokes	17,888	42.4	+1.8
Labor	John O'Brien	14,715	34.9	−8.4
Democratic Labor	Barry O'Brien	6,822	16.2	+0.7
Independent	Lance Hutchinson	2,734	6.5	+6.5
Total formal votes		42,159	96.1	
Informal votes		1,721	3.9	
Turnout		43,880	95.9	
Two-party-preferred result
Liberal	Philip Stokes	24,300	57.6	+2.4
Labor	John O'Brien	17,859	42.4	−2.4
Liberal hold		Swing	+2.4	

=== McMillan ===
This section is an excerpt from Electoral results for the Division of McMillan § 1966

1966 Australian federal election: McMillan
Party	Candidate	Votes	%	±%
Liberal	Alex Buchanan	22,857	50.4	+0.6
Labor	Eric Kent	15,449	34.1	−4.4
Democratic Labor	Les Hilton	5,040	11.1	−0.5
Independent	Thomas Yates	2,000	4.4	+4.4
Total formal votes		45,346	97.0	
Informal votes		1,397	3.0	
Turnout		46,743	96.2	
Two-party-preferred result
Liberal	Alex Buchanan		62.6	+2.2
Labor	Eric Kent		37.4	−2.2
Liberal hold		Swing	+2.2	

=== Melbourne ===
This section is an excerpt from Electoral results for the Division of Melbourne § 1966

1966 Australian federal election: Melbourne
Party	Candidate	Votes	%	±%
Labor	Arthur Calwell	14,355	52.8	−4.1
Liberal	Donald Gibson	7,593	26.9	+1.7
Democratic Labor	James Whitehead	3,655	13.4	−3.5
Independent	Ronald Batey	1,577	5.8	+5.8
Total formal votes		27,180	93.5	
Informal votes		1,892	6.5	
Turnout		29,072	92.3	
Two-party-preferred result
Labor	Arthur Calwell		57.5	−2.0
Liberal	Donald Gibson		42.5	+2.0
Labor hold		Swing	−2.0	

=== Melbourne Ports ===
This section is an excerpt from Electoral results for the Division of Melbourne Ports § 1966

1966 Australian federal election: Melbourne Ports
Party	Candidate	Votes	%	±%
Labor	Frank Crean	16,003	55.5	−8.0
Liberal	Richard Thomas	7,123	24.7	+2.6
Democratic Labor	George O'Dwyer	3,304	11.5	−1.0
Communist	David Clark	2,402	8.3	+6.4
Total formal votes		28,832	94.9	
Informal votes		1,543	5.1	
Turnout		30,375	94.2	
Two-party-preferred result
Labor	Frank Crean		64.1	−2.4
Liberal	Richard Thomas		35.9	+2.4
Labor hold		Swing	−2.4	

=== Murray ===
This section is an excerpt from Electoral results for the Division of Murray § 1966

1966 Australian federal election: Murray
Party	Candidate	Votes	%	±%
Country	John McEwen	31,209	66.4	+2.1
Labor	Mervyn Huggins	9,848	21.0	−1.6
Democratic Labor	Brian Lacey	5,927	12.6	−0.4
Total formal votes		46,984	96.8	
Informal votes		1,570	3.2	
Turnout		48,554	96.9	
Two-party-preferred result
Country	John McEwen		77.7	+1.7
Labor	Mervyn Huggins		22.3	−1.7
Country hold		Swing	+1.7	

=== Scullin ===
This section is an excerpt from Electoral results for the Division of Scullin (1955–69) § 1966

1966 Australian federal election: Scullin
Party	Candidate	Votes	%	±%
Labor	Ted Peters	14,271	53.3	−5.2
Liberal	Ronald Hay	7,267	27.1	+5.7
Democratic Labor	Peter McCabe	2,072	11.5	−6.6
Independent	John Daley	2,164	8.1	+8.1
Total formal votes		26,774	92.2	
Informal votes		2,271	7.8	
Turnout		29,045	92.7	
Two-party-preferred result
Labor	Ted Peters		58.0	−3.9
Liberal	Ronald Hay		42.0	+3.9
Labor hold		Swing	−3.9	

=== Wannon ===
This section is an excerpt from Electoral results for the Division of Wannon § 1966

1966 Australian federal election: Wannon
Party	Candidate	Votes	%	±%
Liberal	Malcolm Fraser	23,220	53.3	+1.4
Labor	Cyril Primmer	13,800	31.7	−1.3
Democratic Labor	Terence Callander	6,514	15.0	−0.1
Total formal votes		43,534	98.6	
Informal votes		629	1.4	
Turnout		44,163	97.3	
Two-party-preferred result
Liberal	Malcolm Fraser		66.9	+1.3
Labor	Cyril Primmer		33.1	−1.3
Liberal hold		Swing	+1.3	

=== Wills ===
This section is an excerpt from Electoral results for the Division of Wills § 1966

1966 Australian federal election: Wills
Party	Candidate	Votes	%	±%
Labor	Gordon Bryant	18,455	53.6	−0.5
Liberal	David Hutchinson	10,714	31.1	+2.2
Democratic Labor	John Flint	5,239	15.2	−1.7
Total formal votes		34,408	95.1	
Informal votes		1,776	4.9	
Turnout		36,184	94.8	
Two-party-preferred result
Labor	Gordon Bryant		55.1	−0.7
Liberal	David Hutchinson		44.9	+0.7
Labor hold		Swing	−0.7	

=== Wimmera ===
This section is an excerpt from Electoral results for the Division of Wimmera § 1966

1966 Australian federal election: Wimmera
Party	Candidate	Votes	%	±%
Country	Robert King	14,860	38.7	−4.3
Labor	George Jeffs	10,210	26.6	−1.7
Liberal	Wilson Bolton	10,139	26.4	+6.9
Democratic Labor	Bruno d'Elia	3,160	8.2	−1.1
Total formal votes		38,369	97.8	
Informal votes		858	2.2	
Turnout		39,227	97.2	
Two-party-preferred result
Country	Robert King	19,359	50.5	−18.7
Liberal	Wilson Bolton	19,010	49.5	+49.5
Country hold		Swing	−18.7	

=== Yarra ===
This section is an excerpt from Electoral results for the Division of Yarra § 1966

1966 Australian federal election: Yarra
Party	Candidate	Votes	%	±%
Labor	Jim Cairns	14,352	48.8	−7.2
Liberal	Lionel Hawkins	9,381	31.9	+3.1
Democratic Labor	Stan Keon	4,110	14.0	−1.2
Independent	Bruno Bonomo	1,564	5.3	+5.3
Total formal votes		29,407	94.9	
Informal votes		1,594	5.1	
Turnout		31,001	93.5	
Two-party-preferred result
Labor	Jim Cairns		53.6	−3.9
Liberal	Lionel Hawkins		46.4	+3.9
Labor hold		Swing	−3.9	

== Queensland ==
1966 Australian federal election (Queensland)
← 1963	26 November 1966	1969 →

All 18 Queensland seats in the House of Representatives 10 seats needed for a majority
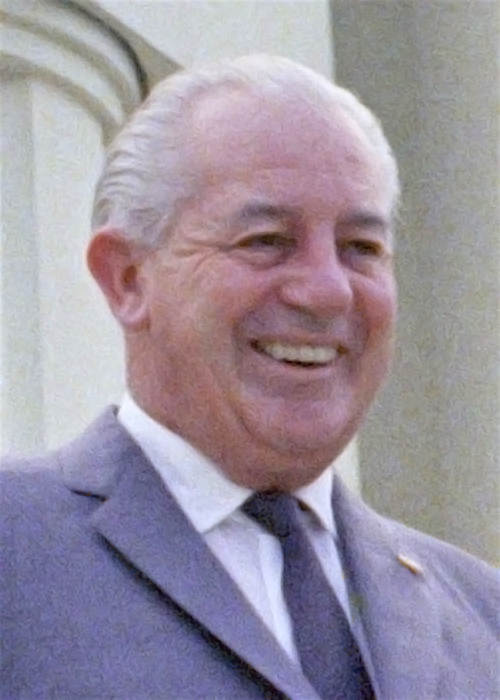

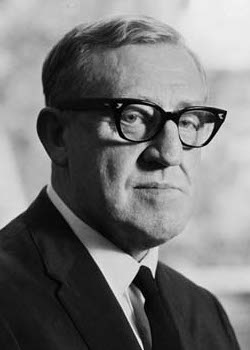
	First party	Second party
Leader	Harold Holt	Arthur Calwell
Party	Coalition	Labor
Seats before	10	8
Seats won	12	6
Seat change	▲2	▼2
Popular vote	419,021	354,674
Percentage	49.7%	42.1%
Swing	▲2.8pp	▼4.2pp
TPP	55.7%	44.3%
TPP swing	▲3.8pp	▼3.8pp

=== Bowman ===
This section is an excerpt from Electoral results for the Division of Bowman § 1966

1966 Australian federal election: Bowman
Party	Candidate	Votes	%	±%
Liberal	Wylie Gibbs	25,921	51.3	+5.5
Labor	Jack Comber	21,152	41.9	−5.8
Democratic Labor	Paul Tucker	3,458	6.8	+0.3
Total formal votes		50,531	98.5	
Informal votes		767	1.5	
Turnout		51,298	95.7	
Two-party-preferred result
Liberal	Wylie Gibbs		56.7	+5.3
Labor	Jack Comber		43.3	−5.3
Liberal hold		Swing	+5.3	

=== Brisbane ===
This section is an excerpt from Electoral results for the Division of Brisbane § 1966

1966 Australian federal election: Brisbane
Party	Candidate	Votes	%	±%
Labor	Manfred Cross	16,728	48.6	−1.5
Liberal	Brian Perkins	14,607	42.4	+2.3
Democratic Labor	Patrick Hallinan	3,076	8.9	+2.9
Total formal votes		34,411	97.0	
Informal votes		1,081	3.0	
Turnout		35,492	92.4	
Two-party-preferred result
Labor	Manfred Cross	17,516	50.9	−3.9
Liberal	Brian Perkins	16,895	49.1	+3.9
Labor hold		Swing	−3.9	

=== Capricornia ===
This section is an excerpt from Electoral results for the Division of Capricornia § 1966

1966 Australian federal election: Capricornia
Party	Candidate	Votes	%	±%
Labor	George Gray	20,315	52.2	−3.9
Liberal	Neil McKendry	14,977	38.5	+2.4
Democratic Labor	Peter Boyle	3,635	9.3	+1.5
Total formal votes		38,927	98.8	
Informal votes		482	1.2	
Turnout		39,409	96.4	
Two-party-preferred result
Labor	George Gray		54.9	−2.8
Liberal	Neil McKendry		45.1	+2.8
Labor hold		Swing	−2.8	

=== Darling Downs ===
This section is an excerpt from Electoral results for the Division of Darling Downs § 1966

1966 Australian federal election: Darling Downs
Party	Candidate	Votes	%	±%
Liberal	Reginald Swartz	26,585	60.5	−0.7
Labor	Desmond Hare	13,413	30.5	−3.4
Democratic Labor	Francis Mullins	3,944	9.0	+4.1
Total formal votes		43,942	98.7	
Informal votes		573	1.3	
Turnout		44,515	96.9	
Two-party-preferred result
Liberal	Reginald Swartz		67.7	+2.6
Labor	Desmond Hare		32.3	−2.6
Liberal hold		Swing	+2.6	

=== Dawson ===
This section is an excerpt from Electoral results for the Division of Dawson § 1966

1966 Australian federal election: Dawson
Party	Candidate	Votes	%	±%
Labor	Rex Patterson	22,428	55.7	+14.3
Country	John Fordyce	16,510	41.0	−10.8
Democratic Labor	Bernard Lewis	1,335	3.3	−3.5
Total formal votes		40,273	98.6	
Informal votes		584	1.4	
Turnout		40,857	96.5	
Two-party-preferred result
Labor	Rex Patterson		56.4	+12.8
Country	John Fordyce		43.6	−12.8
Labor hold		Swing	+12.8	

=== Fisher ===
This section is an excerpt from Electoral results for the Division of Fisher § 1966

1966 Australian federal election: Fisher
Party	Candidate	Votes	%	±%
Country	Charles Adermann	29,855	66.2	+2.2
Labor	Alfred Walker	12,445	27.6	−4.7
Democratic Labor	Robert Barron	2,814	6.2	+2.6
Total formal votes		45,114	98.4	
Informal votes		721	1.6	
Turnout		45,835	96.5	
Two-party-preferred result
Country	Charles Adermann		71.2	+4.3
Labor	Alfred Walker		38.8	−4.3
Country hold		Swing	+4.3	

=== Griffith ===
This section is an excerpt from Electoral results for the Division of Griffith § 1966

1966 Australian federal election: Griffith
Party	Candidate	Votes	%	±%
Labor	Wilfred Coutts	17,755	46.9	−7.6
Liberal	Don Cameron	17,047	45.0	+6.3
Democratic Labor	John Fitz-Gibbon	2,633	6.9	+0.2
Communist	Vic Slater	456	1.2	+1.2
Total formal votes		37,891	97.5	
Informal votes		989	2.5	
Turnout		38,880	94.8	
Two-party-preferred result
Liberal	Don Cameron	19,346	51.1	+6.9
Labor	Wilfred Coutts	18,545	48.9	−6.9
Liberal gain from Labor		Swing	+6.9	

=== Herbert ===
This section is an excerpt from Electoral results for the Division of Herbert § 1966

1966 Australian federal election: Herbert
Party	Candidate	Votes	%	±%
Labor	Ted Harding	22,212	45.3	−1.2
Liberal	Robert Bonnett	18,721	38.2	+5.5
Democratic Labor	Kiernan Dorney	8,053	16.4	−2.1
Total formal votes		48,986	98.1	
Informal votes		955	1.9	
Turnout		49,941	95.7	
Two-party-preferred result
Liberal	Robert Bonnett	25,041	51.1	+4.3
Labor	Ted Harding	23,945	48.9	−4.3
Liberal gain from Labor		Swing	+4.3	

=== Kennedy ===
This section is an excerpt from Electoral results for the Division of Kennedy § 1966

1966 Australian federal election: Kennedy
Party	Candidate	Votes	%	±%
Country	Bob Katter, Sr.	15,387	44.8	+12.5
Labor	Barry Dittmer	15,250	44.4	−17.0
Democratic Labor	Edward Bennett	2,762	8.0	+1.7
Independent	John Donaldson	942	2.7	+2.7
Total formal votes		34,341	98.3	
Informal votes		591	1.7	
Turnout		34,932	91.8	
Two-party-preferred result
Country	Bob Katter, Sr.	17,683	51.5	+15.0
Labor	Barry Dittmer	16,658	48.5	−15.0
Country gain from Labor		Swing	+15.0	

=== Leichhardt ===
This section is an excerpt from Electoral results for the Division of Leichhardt § 1966

1966 Australian federal election: Leichhardt
Party	Candidate	Votes	%	±%
Labor	Bill Fulton	24,639	56.0	−2.0
Country	Michael Turner	16,988	38.6	−0.8
Democratic Labor	Geoffrey Higham	2,395	5.4	+2.7
Total formal votes		44,022	97.2	
Informal votes		1,245	2.8	
Turnout		45,267	92.9	
Two-party-preferred result
Labor	Bill Fulton		57.1	−1.4
Country	Michael Turner		42.9	+1.4
Labor hold		Swing	−1.4	

=== Lilley ===
This section is an excerpt from Electoral results for the Division of Lilley § 1966

1966 Australian federal election: Lilley
Party	Candidate	Votes	%	±%
Liberal	Kevin Cairns	24,001	51.7	+6.1
Labor	Frank Melit	18,695	40.3	−5.4
Democratic Labor	Reginald Lincoln	3,402	7.3	−1.4
Independent	Sarah Ross	334	0.7	+0.7
Total formal votes		46,342	98.2	
Informal votes		861	1.8	
Turnout		47,293	95.0	
Two-party-preferred result
Liberal	Kevin Cairns		57.9	+4.4
Labor	Frank Melit		42.1	−4.4
Liberal hold		Swing	+4.4	

=== Maranoa ===
This section is an excerpt from Electoral results for the Division of Maranoa § 1966

1966 Australian federal election: Maranoa
Party	Candidate	Votes	%	±%
Country	James Corbett	22,656	59.5	+4.7
Labor	Jack Tonkin	11,974	31.5	−10.9
Democratic Labor	Bryan Hurley	3,419	9.0	+6.2
Total formal votes		38,049	98.5	
Informal votes		582	1.5	
Turnout		38,631	94.0	
Two-party-preferred result
Country	James Corbett		66.7	+9.7
Labor	Jack Tonkin		33.3	−9.7
Country hold		Swing	+9.7	

=== McPherson ===
This section is an excerpt from Electoral results for the Division of McPherson § 1966

1966 Australian federal election: McPherson
Party	Candidate	Votes	%	±%
Country	Charles Barnes	39,271	59.5	+1.4
Labor	Allan Swinton	21,001	31.8	−5.8
Democratic Labor	Frederick Burges	3,137	4.8	+0.5
Independent	Harold Brennan	2,578	3.9	+3.9
Total formal votes		65,987	97.8	
Informal votes		1,465	2.2	
Turnout		67,452	94.8	
Two-party-preferred result
Country	Charles Barnes		65.3	+3.8
Labor	Allan Swinton		34.7	−3.8
Country hold		Swing	+3.8	

=== Moreton ===
This section is an excerpt from Electoral results for the Division of Moreton § 1966

1966 Australian federal election: Moreton
Party	Candidate	Votes	%	±%
Liberal	James Killen	35,179	54.4	+5.1
Labor	Len Keogh	25,092	38.8	−5.4
Democratic Labor	Miroslav Jansky	4,405	6.8	+0.3
Total formal votes		64,676	97.8	
Informal votes		1,368	2.1	
Turnout		66,044	95.5	
Two-party-preferred result
Liberal	James Killen		59.0	+4.0
Labor	Len Keogh		41.0	−4.0
Liberal hold		Swing	+4.0	

=== Oxley ===
This section is an excerpt from Electoral results for the Division of Oxley § 1966

1966 Australian federal election: Oxley
Party	Candidate	Votes	%	±%
Labor	Bill Hayden	25,692	57.2	−0.4
Liberal	Colin Logan	9,627	21.4	−16.6
Country	Stewart Fletcher	7,755	17.3	+17.3
Democratic Labor	Thomas Dalton	1,832	4.1	−0.3
Total formal votes		44,906	98.6	
Informal votes		638	1.4	
Turnout		45,544	96.4	
Two-party-preferred result
Labor	Bill Hayden		59.6	+1.3
Liberal	Colin Logan		40.4	−1.3
Labor hold		Swing	+1.3	

=== Petrie ===
This section is an excerpt from Electoral results for the Division of Petrie § 1966

1966 Australian federal election: Petrie
Party	Candidate	Votes	%	±%
Liberal	Alan Hulme	34,715	51.9	+4.8
Labor	Reginald O'Brien	26,073	39.0	−6.7
Democratic Labor	Thomas Grundy	5,740	8.6	+1.7
Independent	Francis O'Mara	299	0.4	+0.1
Total formal votes		66,827	98.4	
Informal votes		1,081	1.6	
Turnout		67,908	95.5	
Two-party-preferred result
Liberal	Alan Hulme		59.2	+5.7
Labor	Reginald O'Brien		40.8	−5.7
Liberal hold		Swing	+5.7	

=== Ryan ===
This section is an excerpt from Electoral results for the Division of Ryan § 1966

1966 Australian federal election: Ryan
Party	Candidate	Votes	%	±%
Liberal	Nigel Drury	32,283	59.6	+1.4
Labor	Donald Jeffries	16,351	30.2	−3.4
Democratic Labor	Brian O'Brien	4,788	8.8	+1.7
Independent	John Thurwall	756	1.4	+1.4
Total formal votes		54,178	98.4	
Informal votes		873	1.6	
Turnout		55,051	96.0	
Two-party-preferred result
Liberal	Nigel Drury		67.3	+1.6
Labor	Donald Jeffries		32.7	−1.6
Liberal hold		Swing	+1.6	

=== Wide Bay ===
This section is an excerpt from Electoral results for the Division of Wide Bay § 1966

1966 Australian federal election: Wide Bay
Party	Candidate	Votes	%	±%
Labor	Brendan Hansen	23,459	54.9	−1.1
Country	Albert White	16,936	39.6	−0.4
Democratic Labor	William Hutchinson	2,347	5.5	+3.2
Total formal votes		42,742	98.3	
Informal votes		739	1.7	
Turnout		43,481	96.7	
Two-party-preferred result
Labor	Brendan Hansen		56.0	−1.3
Country	Albert White		44.0	+1.3
Labor hold		Swing	−1.3	

== South Australia ==
1966 Australian federal election (South Australia)
← 1963	26 November 1966	1969 →

All 11 SA seats in the House of Representatives 6 seats needed for a majority
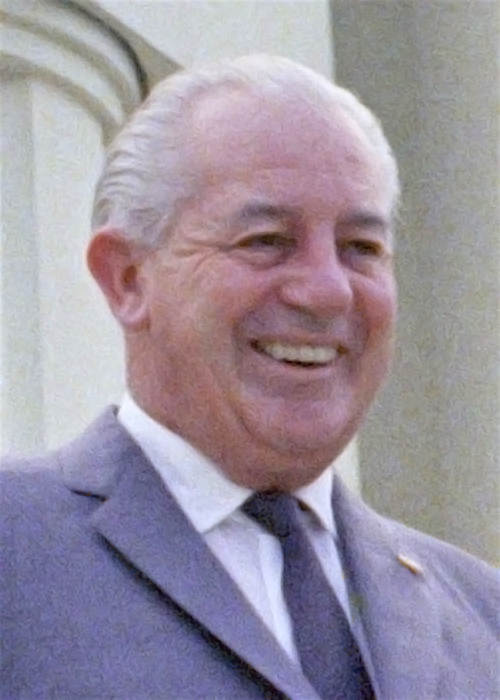

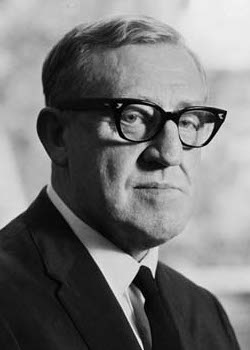
	First party	Second party
Leader	Harold Holt	Arthur Calwell
Party	Coalition	Labor
Seats before	5	6
Seats won	8	3
Seat change	▲3	▼3
Popular vote	296,923	222,828
Percentage	54.3%	40.7%
Swing	▲18.3pp	▼12.5pp
TPP	57.6%	42.4%
TPP swing	▲10.9pp	▼10.9pp

=== Adelaide ===
This section is an excerpt from Electoral results for the Division of Adelaide § 1966

1966 Australian federal election: Adelaide
Party	Candidate	Votes	%	±%
Liberal	Andrew Jones	14,724	48.7	+11.1
Labor	Joe Sexton	14,027	46.4	−9.7
Democratic Labor	George Basisovs	1,466	4.9	−1.4
Total formal votes		30,217	96.6	
Informal votes		1,065	3.4	
Turnout		31,282	95.0	
Two-party-preferred result
Liberal	Andrew Jones	15,961	52.8	+10.0
Labor	Joe Sexton	14,256	47.2	−10.0
Liberal gain from Labor		Swing	+10.0	

=== Angas ===
This section is an excerpt from Electoral results for the Division of Angas (1949–1977) § 1949

1966 Australian federal election: Angas
Party	Candidate	Votes	%	±%
Liberal	Geoffrey Giles	30,070	70.7	+8.8
Labor	Robert Nielsen	12,464	29.3	−6.2
Total formal votes		42,534	97.5	
Informal votes		1,092	2.5	
Turnout		43,626	96.7	
Liberal hold		Swing	+8.5	

=== Barker ===
This section is an excerpt from Electoral results for the Division of Barker § 1966

1966 Australian federal election: Barker
Party	Candidate	Votes	%	±%
Liberal	Jim Forbes	33,921	67.0	+10.2
Labor	Norman Alcock	15,923	31.4	−9.6
Communist	Don Jarrett	819	1.6	+1.6
Total formal votes		50,663	98.0	
Informal votes		1,053	2.0	
Turnout		51,716	96.9	
Two-party-preferred result
Liberal	Jim Forbes		67.2	+9.3
Labor	Norman Alcock		32.8	−9.3
Liberal hold		Swing	+9.3	

=== Bonython ===
This section is an excerpt from Electoral results for the Division of Bonython § 1966

1966 Australian federal election: Bonython
Party	Candidate	Votes	%	±%
Labor	Martin Nicholls	40,133	49.5	−21.4
Liberal	John Kershaw	33,493	41.3	+41.3
Social Credit	Luke Horan	4,549	5.6	+5.6
Democratic Labor	Edward Timlin	2,856	3.5	−18.4
Total formal votes		81,031	96.1	
Informal votes		3,293	3.9	
Turnout		84,324	95.7	
Two-party-preferred result
Labor	Martin Nicholls		52.9	−24.5
Liberal	John Kershaw		47.1	+47.1
Labor hold		Swing	−24.5	

=== Boothby ===
This section is an excerpt from Electoral results for the Division of Boothby § 1966

1966 Australian federal election: Boothby
Party	Candidate	Votes	%	±%
Liberal	John McLeay	28,187	65.4	+10.3
Labor	Thomas Sheehy	12,586	29.2	−11.6
Democratic Labor	Ted Farrell	2,315	5.4	+1.2
Total formal votes		43,088	98.1	
Informal votes		826	1.9	
Turnout		43,914	95.7	
Two-party-preferred result
Liberal	John McLeay		69.9	+11.4
Labor	Thomas Sheehy		30.1	−11.4
Liberal hold		Swing	+11.4	

=== Grey ===
This section is an excerpt from Electoral results for the Division of Grey § 1966

1966 Australian federal election: Grey
Party	Candidate	Votes	%	±%
Liberal	Don Jessop	22,562	48.2	+6.3
Labor	Jack Mortimer	21,391	45.7	−8.5
Democratic Labor	Douglas Barnes	2,811	6.0	+2.2
Total formal votes		46,764	98.2	
Informal votes		864	1.8	
Turnout		47,628	96.0	
Two-party-preferred result
Liberal	Don Jessop	24,797	53.0	+7.8
Labor	Jack Mortimer	21,967	47.0	−7.8
Liberal gain from Labor		Swing	+7.8	

=== Hindmarsh ===
This section is an excerpt from Electoral results for the Division of Hindmarsh § 1966

1966 Australian federal election: Hindmarsh
Party	Candidate	Votes	%	±%
Labor	Clyde Cameron	26,096	50.9	−21.0
Liberal	Ross Stanford	23,255	45.4	+45.4
Democratic Labor	Cyril Holasek	1,927	3.8	−24.3
Total formal votes		51,278	96.5	
Informal votes		1,834	3.5	
Turnout		53,112	96.3	
Two-party-preferred result
Labor	Clyde Cameron		51.7	−20.2
Liberal	Ross Stanford		48.3	+48.3
Labor hold		Swing	−20.2	

=== Kingston ===
This section is an excerpt from Electoral results for the Division of Kingston § 1966

1966 Australian federal election: Kingston
Party	Candidate	Votes	%	±%
Liberal	Kay Brownbill	35,041	53.4	+11.7
Labor	Pat Galvin	26,764	40.8	−12.8
Democratic Labor	Allan Anderson	3,776	5.8	+1.1
Total formal votes		65,581	98.1	
Informal votes		1,300	1.9	
Turnout		66,881	96.8	
Two-party-preferred result
Liberal	Kay Brownbill		58.2	+12.7
Labor	Pat Galvin		41.8	−12.7
Liberal gain from Labor		Swing	+12.7	

=== Port Adelaide ===
This section is an excerpt from Electoral results for the Division of Port Adelaide § 1966

1966 Australian federal election: Port Adelaide
Party	Candidate	Votes	%	±%
Labor	Fred Birrell	23,766	57.4	−18.8
Liberal	Peter Balnaves	12,911	31.2	+31.2
Democratic Labor	Michael Bowler	1,973	4.8	−15.4
Social Credit	Denis McEvoy	1,803	4.4	+4.4
Communist	Jim Moss	918	2.2	−1.4
Total formal votes		41,371	94.4	
Informal votes		2,468	5.6	
Turnout		43,839	96.2	
Two-party-preferred result
Labor	Fred Birrell		62.5	−16.9
Liberal	Peter Balnaves		37.5	+37.5
Labor hold		Swing	−16.9	

=== Sturt ===
This section is an excerpt from Electoral results for the Division of Sturt § 1966

1966 Australian federal election: Sturt
Party	Candidate	Votes	%	±%
Liberal	Ian Wilson	31,479	63.5	+7.5
Labor	Keith Le Page	15,941	32.2	−6.4
Democratic Labor	Walter Doran	2,157	4.4	−1.0
Total formal votes		49,577	97.9	
Informal votes		1,455	2.9	
Turnout		51,032	95.8	
Two-party-preferred result
Liberal	Ian Wilson		66.2	+6.7
Labor	Keith Le Page		33.8	−6.7
Liberal hold		Swing	+6.7	

=== Wakefield ===
This section is an excerpt from Electoral results for the Division of Wakefield § 1966

1966 Australian federal election: Wakefield
Party	Candidate	Votes	%	±%
Liberal	Bert Kelly	31,280	69.5	+8.4
Labor	John Phelan	13,737	30.5	−8.4
Total formal votes		45,017	97.9	
Informal votes		970	2.1	
Turnout		45,987	97.1	
Liberal hold		Swing	+8.4	

== Western Australia ==
1966 Australian federal election (Western Australia)
← 1963	26 November 1966	1969 →

All 9 WA seats in the House of Representatives 5 seats needed for a majority
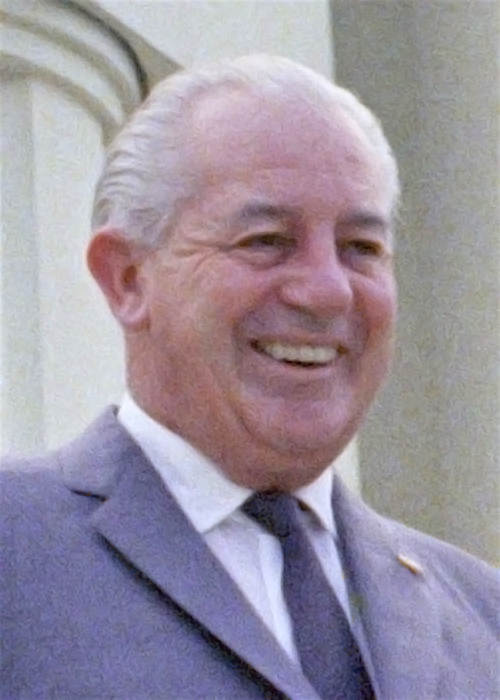

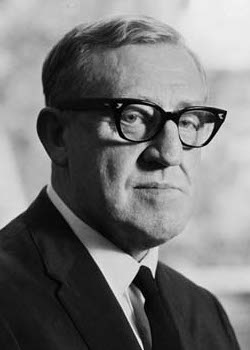
	First party	Second party
Leader	Harold Holt	Arthur Calwell
Party	Coalition	Labor
Seats before	6	3
Seats won	6	3
Seat change	Steady	Steady
Popular vote	193,418	168,257
Percentage	49.2%	42.8%
Swing	▼4.8pp	▲3.6pp
TPP	54.3%	45.7%
TPP swing	▼1.9pp	▲1.9pp

=== Canning ===
This section is an excerpt from Electoral results for the Division of Canning § 1966

1966 Australian federal election: Canning
Party	Candidate	Votes	%	±%
Country	John Hallett	17,709	43.0	+15.3
Labor	Charles Edwards	11,110	27.0	+0.9
Liberal	Norman Snow	10,119	24.6	−18.9
Democratic Labor	Bryan Finlay	2,227	5.4	+5.4
Total formal votes		41,165	95.5	
Informal votes		1,951	4.5	
Turnout		43,116	95.2	
Two-party-preferred result
Country	John Hallett	28,736	69.8	+17.6
Labor	Charles Edwards	12,429	30.2	+30.2
Country hold		Swing	+17.6	

=== Curtin ===
This section is an excerpt from Electoral results for the Division of Curtin § 1966

1966 Australian federal election: Curtin
Party	Candidate	Votes	%	±%
Liberal	Paul Hasluck	24,135	59.9	−15.7
Labor	John Brind	12,206	30.3	+30.3
Democratic Labor	Francis Dwyer	3,945	9.8	−8.3
Total formal votes		40,286	97.2	
Informal votes		1,580	3.8	
Turnout		41,866	94.6	
Two-party-preferred result
Liberal	Paul Hasluck		67.7	−11.1
Labor	John Brind		32.3	+32.3
Liberal hold		Swing	−11.1	

=== Forrest ===
This section is an excerpt from Electoral results for the Division of Forrest § 1966

1966 Australian federal election: Forrest
Party	Candidate	Votes	%	±%
Liberal	Gordon Freeth	20,834	51.1	−1.0
Labor	Frank Kirwan	15,796	38.7	−0.9
Democratic Labor	Maurice Bailey	4,163	10.2	+10.2
Total formal votes		40,793	96.4	
Informal votes		1,524	3.6	
Turnout		42,317	96.2	
Two-party-preferred result
Liberal	Gordon Freeth		59.5	+3.3
Labor	Frank Kirwan		40.5	−3.3
Liberal hold		Swing	+3.3	

=== Fremantle ===
This section is an excerpt from Electoral results for the Division of Fremantle § 1966

1966 Australian federal election: Fremantle
Party	Candidate	Votes	%	±%
Labor	Kim Beazley Sr.	29,827	57.0	+2.1
Liberal	John Waghorne	18,909	36.1	−6.1
Democratic Labor	John Martyr	2,378	4.5	+4.5
Communist	Paddy Troy	1,248	2.4	+1.0
Total formal votes		52,362	96.1	
Informal votes		2,135	3.9	
Turnout		54,497	95.4	
Two-party-preferred result
Labor	Kim Beazley Sr.		60.1	+3.1
Liberal	John Waghorne		39.9	−3.1
Labor hold		Swing	+3.1	

=== Kalgoorlie ===
This section is an excerpt from Electoral results for the Division of Kalgoorlie § 1966

1966 Australian federal election: Kalgoorlie
Party	Candidate	Votes	%	±%
Labor	Fred Collard	18,393	59.5	+7.2
Liberal	Grahame Jonas	10,762	34.8	−6.2
Democratic Labor	Geoffrey Sands	1,765	5.7	−1.0
Total formal votes		30,920	96.8	
Informal votes		1,020	3.2	
Turnout		31,940	89.6	
Two-party-preferred result
Labor	Fred Collard		60.6	+7.2
Liberal	Grahame Jonas		39.4	−7.2
Labor hold		Swing	+7.2	

=== Moore ===
This section is an excerpt from Electoral results for the Division of Moore § 1966

1966 Australian federal election: Moore
Party	Candidate	Votes	%	±%
Country	Don Maisey	14,815	35.8	+1.9
Labor	Mal Bryce	14,109	34.1	+2.0
Liberal	Harold Lundy	10,495	25.4	−8.6
Democratic Labor	Gavin O'Connor	1,963	4.7	+4.7
Total formal votes		41,382	96.5	
Informal votes		1,502	3.5	
Turnout		42,884	95.2	
Two-party-preferred result
Country	Don Maisey	25,791	62.3	+4.6
Labor	Mal Bryce	15,591	37.7	+37.7
Country hold		Swing	+4.6	

=== Perth ===
This section is an excerpt from Electoral results for the Division of Perth § 1966

1966 Australian federal election: Perth
Party	Candidate	Votes	%	±%
Liberal	Fred Chaney Sr.	13,223	49.5	−4.8
Labor	Alan Bate	9,785	36.6	−3.6
Democratic Labor	George Mazak	2,071	7.8	+2.2
Communist	Annette Aarons	1,627	6.1	+6.1
Total formal votes		26,706	92.9	
Informal votes		2,046	7.1	
Turnout		28,752	93.4	
Two-party-preferred result
Liberal	Fred Chaney Sr.		56.9	−1.9
Labor	Alan Bate		43.1	+1.9
Liberal hold		Swing	−1.9	

=== Stirling ===
This section is an excerpt from Electoral results for the Division of Stirling § 1966

1966 Australian federal election: Stirling
Party	Candidate	Votes	%	±%
Labor	Harry Webb	33,089	49.9	−0.2
Liberal	Doug Cash	27,403	41.3	−1.8
Democratic Labor	Frank Pownall	5,836	8.8	+2.0
Total formal votes		66,328	96.0	
Informal votes		2,797	4.0	
Turnout		69,125	95.4	
Two-party-preferred result
Labor	Harry Webb	33,998	51.3	−0.2
Liberal	Doug Cash	32,330	48.7	+0.2
Labor hold		Swing	−0.2	

=== Swan ===
This section is an excerpt from Electoral results for the Division of Swan § 1966

1966 Australian federal election: Swan
Party	Candidate	Votes	%	±%
Liberal	Richard Cleaver	25,014	47.1	−0.4
Labor	Edward Gillett	23,942	45.1	−2.2
Democratic Labor	Alan Crofts	4,154	7.8	+3.3
Total formal votes		53,110	96.4	
Informal votes		1,963	3.6	
Turnout		55,073	94.2	
Two-party-preferred result
Liberal	Richard Cleaver	28,440	53.5	+1.4
Labor	Edward Gillett	24,670	46.5	−1.4
Liberal hold		Swing	+1.4	

== Tasmania ==
1966 Australian federal election (Tasmania)
← 1963	26 November 1966	1969 →

All 5 Tasmanian seats in the House of Representatives 3 seats needed for a majority
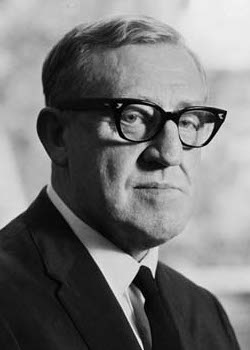

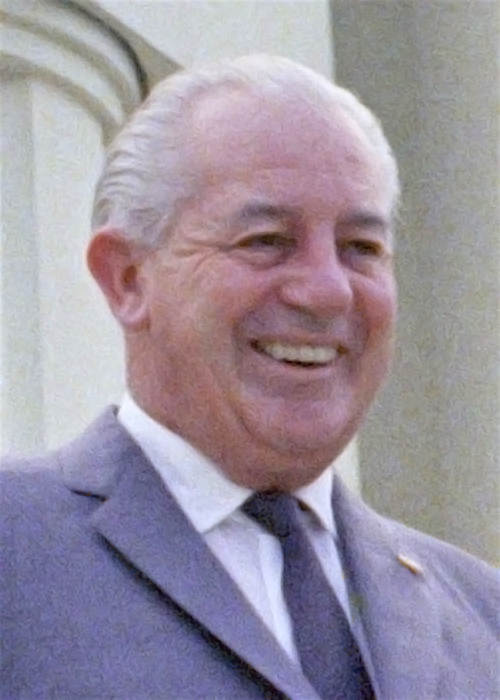
	First party	Second party
Leader	Arthur Calwell	Harold Holt
Party	Labor	Coalition
Seats before	3	2
Seats won	3	2
Seat change	Steady	Steady
Popular vote	96,246	78,684
Percentage	51.7%	42.2%
Swing	▼0.6	▲1.5pp
TPP	53.9%	46.1%
TPP swing	▼0.6pp	▲0.6pp

=== Bass ===
This section is an excerpt from Electoral results for the Division of Bass § 1966

1966 Australian federal election: Bass
Party	Candidate	Votes	%	±%
Labor	Lance Barnard	21,262	57.2	−1.1
Liberal	Timothy Barrenger	13,739	36.9	+0.9
Democratic Labor	Richard Delany	2,183	5.9	+0.2
Total formal votes		37,184	98.6	
Informal votes		538	1.4	
Turnout		37,722	95.3	
Two-party-preferred result
Labor	Lance Barnard		58.4	−1.0
Liberal	Timothy Barrenger		41.6	+1.0
Labor hold		Swing	−1.0	

=== Braddon ===
This section is an excerpt from Electoral results for the Division of Braddon § 1966

1966 Australian federal election: Braddon
Party	Candidate	Votes	%	±%
Labor	Ron Davies	21,040	55.9	−1.7
Liberal	Paul Fenton	14,637	38.9	+1.6
Democratic Labor	John Chapman-Mortimer	1,934	5.1	+0.0
Total formal votes		37,611	98.8	
Informal votes		461	1.2	
Turnout		38,072	95.8	
Two-party-preferred result
Labor	Ron Davies		57.7	−0.9
Liberal	Paul Fenton		42.3	+0.9
Labor hold		Swing	−0.9	

=== Denison ===
This section is an excerpt from Electoral results for the Division of Denison § 1966

1966 Australian federal election: Denison
Party	Candidate	Votes	%	±%
Liberal	Adrian Gibson	15,516	47.8	−3.5
Labor	Neil Batt	14,743	45.4	+6.2
Democratic Labor	Harold Grace	1,942	6.0	−0.4
Communist	Max Bound	289	0.9	−0.6
Total formal votes		32,490	98.1	
Informal votes		622	1.9	
Turnout		33,112	94.6	
Two-party-preferred result
Liberal	Adrian Gibson	17,082	52.6	−4.8
Labor	Neil Batt	15,408	47.4	+4.8
Liberal hold		Swing	−4.8	

=== Franklin ===
This section is an excerpt from Electoral results for the Division of Franklin § 1966

1966 Australian federal election: Franklin
Party	Candidate	Votes	%	±%
Liberal	Thomas Pearsall	21,442	48.0	+2.7
Labor	John Parsons	19,986	44.7	−3.2
Democratic Labor	John Lynch	3,249	7.3	+0.5
Total formal votes		44,677	98.3	
Informal votes		782	1.7	
Turnout		45,459	96.5	
Two-party-preferred result
Liberal	Thomas Pearsall	23,309	52.2	+1.3
Labor	John Parsons	21,368	47.8	−1.3
Liberal hold		Swing	+1.3	

=== Wilmot ===
This section is an excerpt from Electoral results for the Division of Wilmot § 1966

1966 Australian federal election: Wilmot
Party	Candidate	Votes	%	±%
Labor	Gil Duthie	19,215	55.9	−2.8
Liberal	Donald Paterson	13,350	38.8	+5.7
Democratic Labor	Robert Wright	1,824	5.3	−2.9
Total formal votes		34,389	98.7	
Informal votes		446	1.3	
Turnout		34,835	96.2	
Two-party-preferred result
Labor	Gil Duthie		57.0	−4.1
Liberal	Donald Paterson		43.0	+4.1
Labor hold		Swing	−4.1	

== Territories ==
=== Australian Capital Territory ===
1966 Australian federal election (Australian Capital Territory)
← 1963	26 November 1966	1969 →

Division of Australian Capital Territory
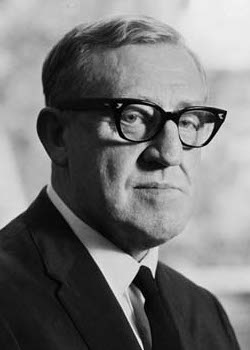

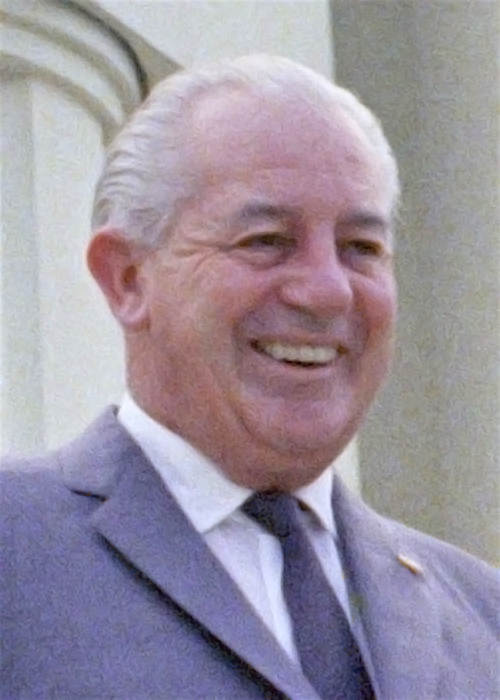
	First party	Second party
Leader	Arthur Calwell	Harold Holt
Party	Labor	Coalition
Seats before	1	0
Seats won	1	0
Seat change	Steady	Steady
Popular vote	22,721	16,685
Percentage	51.6%	36.9%
Swing	▼3.3pp	▼7.2pp
TPP	55.8%	44.2%
TPP swing	▲0.9pp	▼0.9pp

This section is an excerpt from Electoral results for the Division of Australian Capital Territory § 1966

1966 Australian federal election: Australian Capital Territory
Party	Candidate	Votes	%	±%
Labor	Jim Fraser	22,721	51.6	−3.3
Liberal	Robert Rowell	16,685	36.9	−7.2
Democratic Labor	John Donohue	2,193	5.0	+5.0
Independent	Anne Dalgarno	1,458	3.3	+3.3
Independent	Robert Greenish	938	2.1	+2.1
Total formal votes		43,995	98.3	
Informal votes		777	1.7	
Turnout		44,772	93.0	
Two-party-preferred result
Labor	Jim Fraser		55.8	+0.9
Liberal	Robert Rowell		44.2	−0.9
Labor hold		Swing	+0.9	

=== Northern Territory ===
1966 Australian federal election (Northern Territory)
← 1963	26 November 1966	1969 →

Division of Northern Territory
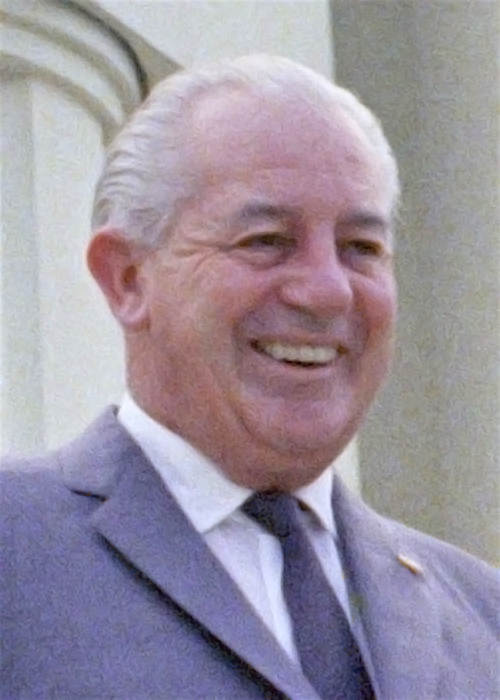

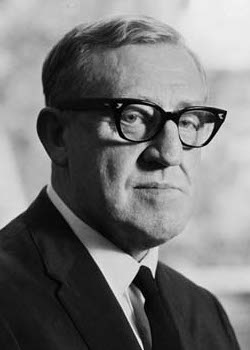
	First party	Second party
Leader	Harold Holt	Arthur Calwell
Party	Coalition	Labor
Seats before	0	1
Seats won	1	0
Seat change	▲1	▼1
Popular vote	7,221	6,734
Percentage	51.7%	48.3%
Swing	▲51.7pp	▼51.7pp

This section is an excerpt from Electoral results for the Division of Northern Territory § 1966

1966 Australian federal election: Northern Territory
Party	Candidate	Votes	%	±%
Country	Sam Calder	7,221	51.7	+51.7
Labor	Richard Ward	6,734	48.3	−51.7
Total formal votes		13,955	96.5	
Informal votes		500	3.5	
Turnout		14,455	83.1	
Country gain from Labor		Swing	+51.7	

== See also ==
- Candidates of the 1966 Australian federal election
- 1966 Australian Senate election
- 1967 Australian Senate election
- Members of the Australian House of Representatives, 1966–1969
- Members of the Australian Senate, 1965–1968
- Members of the Australian Senate, 1968–1971
