= Wallerberdina =

Wallerberdina may refer to:

- Wallerberdina, South Australia
- Wallerberdina Station, pastoral lease in South Australia
