= Wallerberdina Station =

Pastoral lease and cattle station in South Australia

Coordinates: 31.7733°S 138.1336°E

Location in South Australia

Wallerberdina Station, commonly known as Wallerberdina, is a pastoral lease that operates as a

The property is located approximately 40 kilometres (25 mi) west of Hawker and 65 kilometres (40 mi) north of Quorn, sharing boundaries with Yappala Station and Moralana Station.

The property features open terrain with vegetation such as blue bush, cotton bush, black oak, copper burr, native clovers interspersed with sandy ridges. Permanent water livestock is sourced from Hookina Creek and two bores. It is equipped with a four stand shearing shed, cattle and sheep yards, quarters for 12 workers, and a four- bedroom homestead. The station is suitable for sheep or cattle, with annual average carrying equivalent 6000 sheep or 400 cattle.

The property was established before 1878, Wallerberdina was initially stocked with sheep and producing wool, under the ownership of Gooch and Hayward. By 1879, ownership had transferred to Messrs.Hayward, Armstrong and Browne, who were selling merino wethers. In 1880 the government resumed 59 square miles (37,760 acres) of land, a reduction that took effect by 1887.

The property now covers 23,580 hectares (58,267 acres). In 2015, it was owned by South Australian Senator and Liberal Party president Grant Chapman.

That year, Wallerberdina was short-listed as one of three potential sites for the National Radioactive Waste Management Facility. However, the project was scrapped in 2019 due to community opposition.

== See also ==
- List of ranches and stations
