= Richard Gun =

Australian politician and doctor

Dr Richard Gun AO
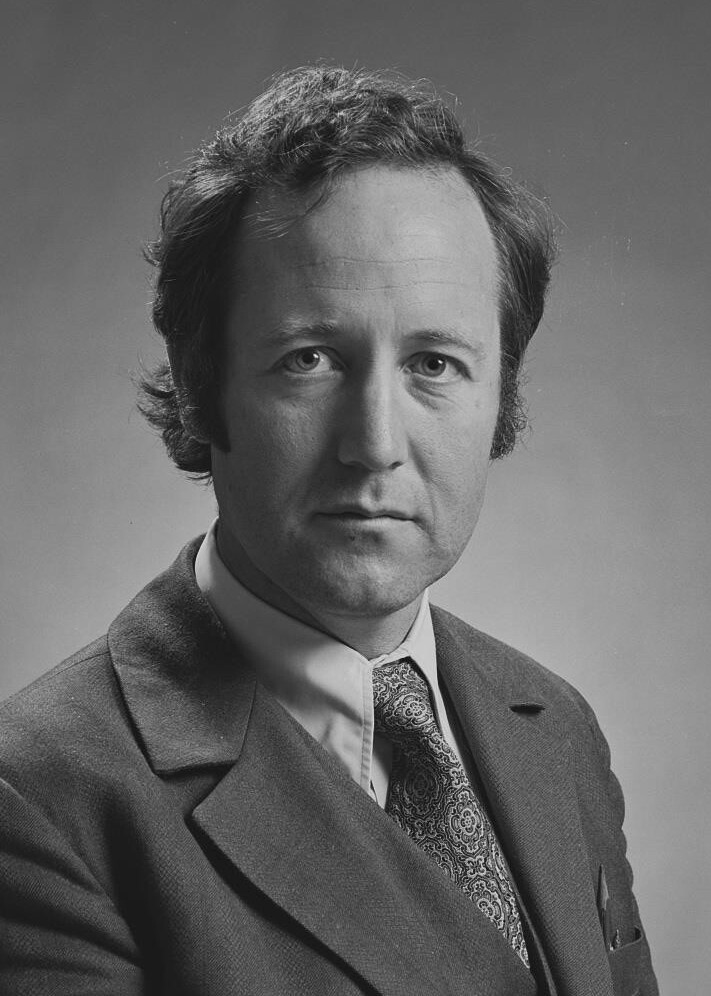
- Gun in 1973

Member of the Australian Parliament for Kingston
- In office 25 October 1969 – 11 November 1975
- Preceded by: Kay Brownbill
- Succeeded by: Grant Chapman

Personal details
- Born: 27 May 1936 (age 90) Adelaide, South Australia
- Party: Australian Labor Party
- Education: University of Adelaide
- Profession: Doctor

Richard Townsend "Richie/Ritchie" Gun AO (born 27 May 1936) is a retired politician and doctor.

Born in Adelaide, South Australia, he was educated at St Peter's College and the University of Adelaide. He was on the anaesthetics registrar at the Royal Adelaide Hospital.

== Political career ==
In 1969 he was elected to the Australian House of Representatives as the Labor member for Kingston, defeating Liberal MP Kay Brownbill. He held the seat until 1975, when he was defeated by the Liberal candidate, Grant Chapman, with a swing of over 12 percent. He unsuccessfully attempted to retake the seat at the next two elections, the second time losing by only 358 votes.

== Medical career ==
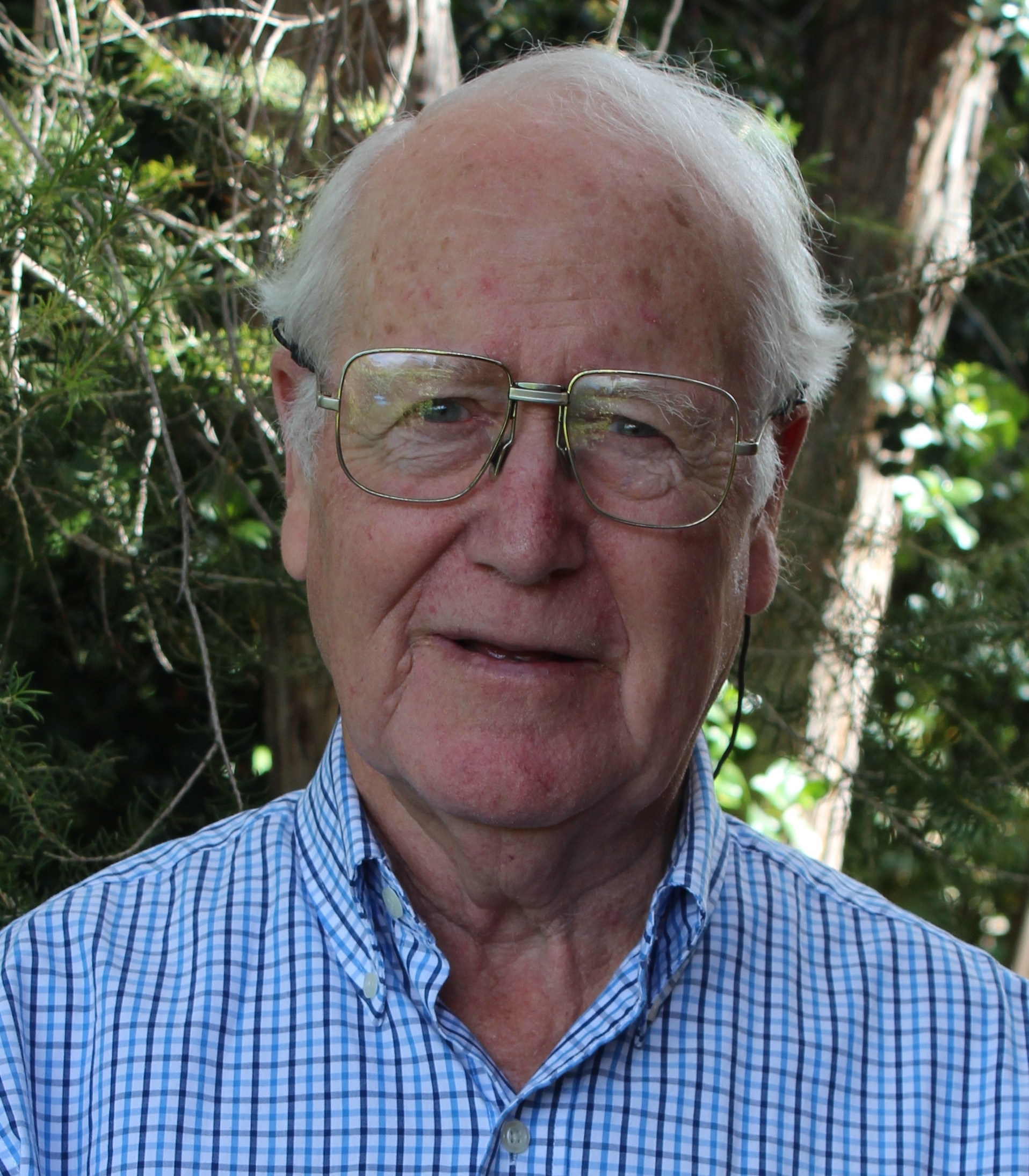
Gun in 2015.

Gun began his work in occupational medicine in the 1970s. He was one of the founding members of the College of Occupational Medicine, now known as the Australasian Faculty of Occupational Medicine.

In 1983 Gun was appointed chair of the Commonwealth Government's Interim National Occupational Health and Safety Commission. The Minister for Employment and Industrial Relations (Ralph Willis) quoted his qualifications as:

"a medical practitioner who is currently a Visiting Scientist with the United States National Institute for Occupational Safety and Health. From his previous position as a Senior Medical Officer in the Occupational Health Branch of the South Australian Health Commission, Dr Gun has a long involvement with, and knowledge of, occupational health in Australia. This, together with his relevant international experience, will bring to the Interim National Commission a most valuable contribution."

In 1990 when he was a senior lecturer in occupational and environmental health at the University of Adelaide he published the results of a study which suggested that the incidence of repetitive strain injury (RSI) was declining in South Australia.

== Honours and awards ==
In 2015 Gun was appointed an Officer of the Order of Australia "for distinguished service to medicine, particularly in the field of occupational health and safety, and to socially disadvantaged communities in regional Australia and Timor-Leste".

== Other interests ==
As a teenager, Gun was a jazz musician of some local celebrity, leader of "Richie Gun's Collegians", a King Oliver / Louis Armstrong inspired band, and has been credited with giving Ted Nettelbeck his first experience in public performance.

Parliament of Australia
Preceded by Kay Brownbill	Member for Kingston; 1969–1975	Succeeded by Grant Chapman
