= Gordon Bilney =

Australian politician (1939–2012)

The Honourable Gordon Bilney
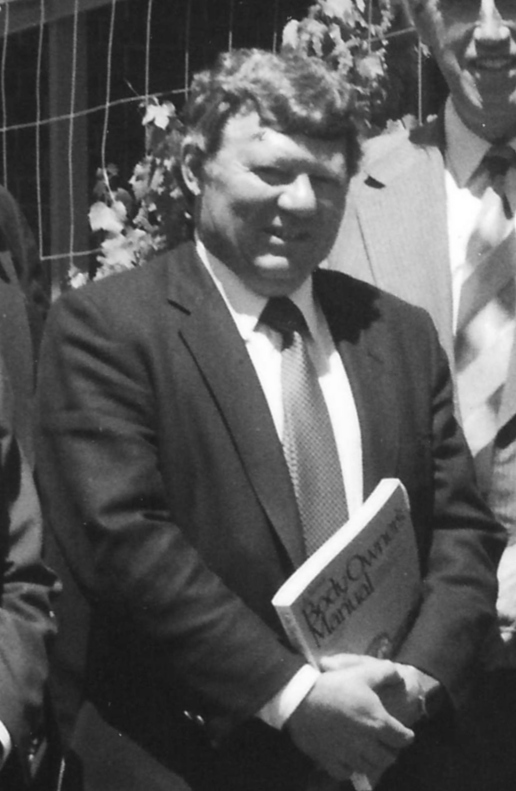
- Bilney in 1984

Member of the Australian Parliament for Kingston
- In office 5 March 1983 – 2 March 1996
- Preceded by: Grant Chapman
- Succeeded by: Susan Jeanes

Personal details
- Born: 21 June 1939 Renmark, South Australia
- Died: 28 October 2012 (aged 73) Marino, South Australia
- Party: Australian Labor Party
- Spouse(s): Elizabeth Gunton (1967–1995); Sandra Colhoun (2002–2012)
- Education: University of Adelaide
- Occupation: Diplomat
- Profession: Dentist

Gordon Neil Bilney (21 June 1939 – 28 October 2012) was an Australian politician. He was an Australian Labor Party member of the Australian House of Representatives for the seat of Kingston from 1983 to 1996.

Bilney was born in Renmark, South Australia. Prior to entering politics, Bilney was a diplomat, and his first chosen occupation, prior to that, was dentistry. He served as Deputy Permanent Representative of Australia to the OECD from 1975 to 1978 and as the Australian High Commissioner to the West Indies from 1980 to 1982, in Jamaica.

He was first elected to federal parliament at the 1983 federal election when the Labor Party, under the leadership of Bob Hawke, defeated the Liberal-National Party government which had held government under prime minister Malcolm Fraser. He won the seat of Kingston, based in the southern suburbs of Adelaide, South Australia, defeating incumbent Liberal MP Grant Chapman. Bilney was subsequently re-elected to the same seat at the 1984, 1987, 1990 and 1993 elections.

Between 1990 and 1996, Bilney was a minister in the Labor governments of Bob Hawke and Paul Keating. He was the Minister for Defence Science and Personnel from 1990 to 1993 and the Minister for Development Cooperation and Pacific Island Affairs from 1993 to 1996.

Bilney was defeated by Liberal candidate Susan Jeanes at the 1996 federal election.

Bilney died on 28 October 2012 at the age of 73.

Political offices
Preceded by David Simmons	Minister for Defence Science and Personnel; 1990–1993	Succeeded by John Faulkner
New creation	Minister for Development Cooperation and Pacific Island Affairs; 1993–1996	Portfolio abolished
Parliament of Australia
Preceded by Grant Chapman	Member for Kingston; 1983–1996	Succeeded by Susan Jeanes
Diplomatic posts
Preceded by Brian Hickey	Australian High Commissioner to Jamaica; 1980 – 1981	Succeeded by R.E. Little
