= Grant Chapman =

Australian politician

Member of the Australian Parliament for Kingston
- In office 13 December 1975 – 5 March 1983
- Preceded by: Richard Gun
- Succeeded by: Gordon Bilney

Senator for South Australia
- In office 11 July 1987 – 30 June 2008

Personal details
- Born: 27 April 1949 (age 77) North Adelaide, South Australia
- Party: Liberal Party of Australia
- Relations: Roger Goldsworthy (brother-in-law); John Chapman (great-uncle)
- Parent(s): Hedley Thomas Chapman and Edith Maud Chapman nee Longmire
- Education: University of Adelaide
- Occupation: Oil executive, management consultant, director

Hedley Grant Pearson Chapman (born 27 April 1949) is an Australian politician.

Born in Adelaide, South Australia, Chapman was educated at Prince Alfred College and the University of Adelaide and worked as a marketing executive in the oil industry and a self-employed management consultant prior to gaining Liberal Party pre-selection for the federal Division of Kingston in the House of Representatives leading to his election in Malcolm Fraser's 1975 landslide win. In the 1980 election, Chapman held Kingston by 358 votes and served in the House of Representatives until his defeat at the 1983 federal election.

Chapman expressed opposition to the development of the Franklin River Dam. After visiting the area he said: "It is a superb area. The visit reinforced my view that it would be a travesty if the dam went ahead."

Chapman unsuccessfully sought preselection for the new seat of Mayo in 1984, and unsuccessfully contested the state electorate of Fisher at the 1985 state election, but returned to federal politics in 1987 as a member of the Australian Senate representing South Australia.

He was defeated at the 2007 election when he was third on the SA Liberal ticket but only two Liberal candidates were elected.

In September 2010, Chapman was elected unopposed as President of the Liberal Party of Australia (South Australian Division) and was re-elected unopposed in 2011 and 2012.

== Personal life ==
Chapman is the joint-owner of the long-term lease over Wallerberdina Station, which is one of three properties short-listed for the prospective development of nuclear waste storage facility in South Australia.

Chapman's great-uncle John Chapman also served in federal parliament.

Parliament of Australia
Preceded by Richard Gun	Member for Kingston; 1975–1983	Succeeded by Gordon Bilney
