= Jim Handby =

Australian politician

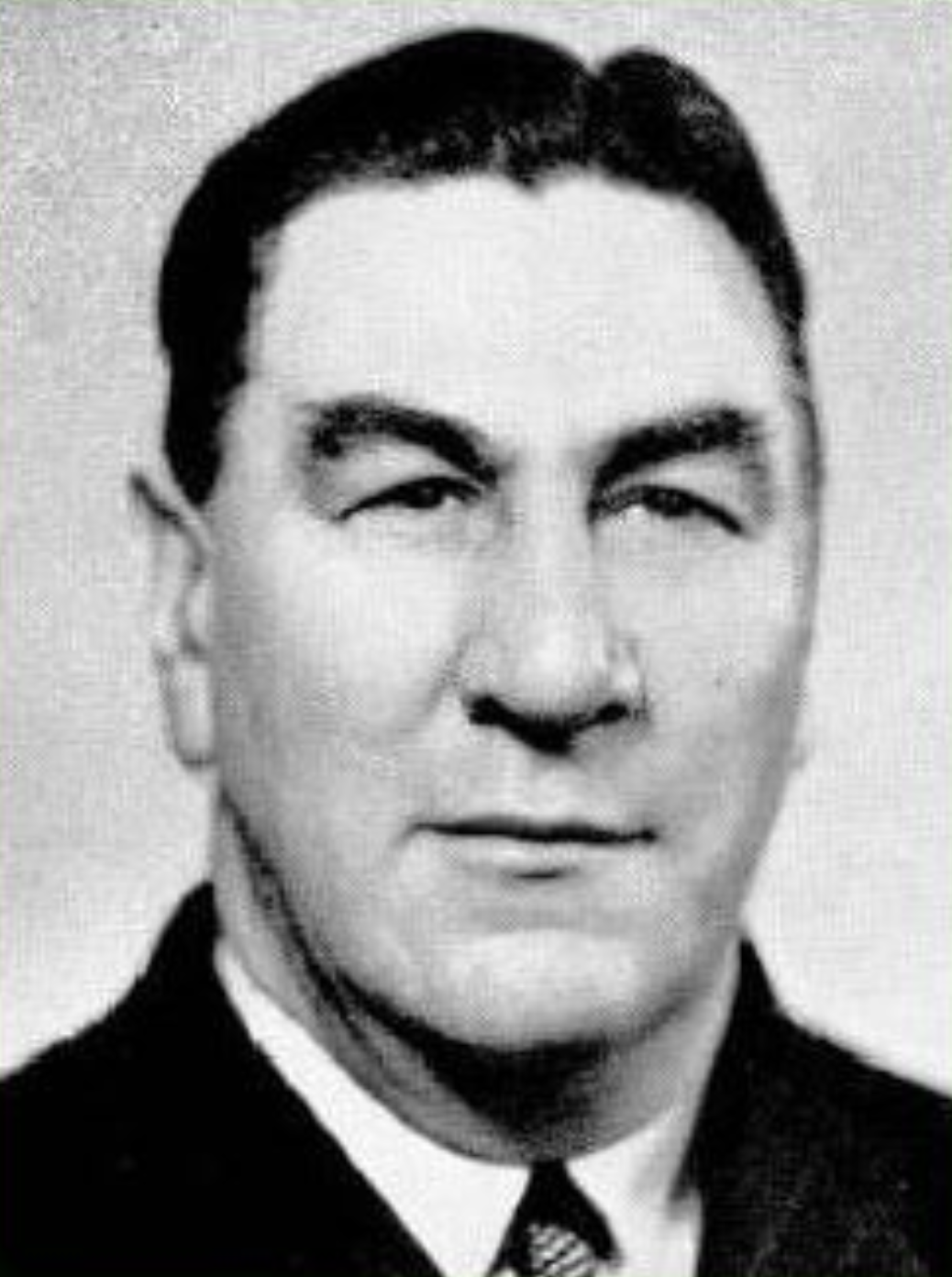

Personal information
- Full name: Herbert Harry Handby
- Born: 1 September 1903; Adelaide, South Australia
- Died: 2 October 1991 (aged 88)
- Position: Defender

Playing career^{1}
Years	Club	Games (Goals)
1922–1924	South Adelaide	32
1925–1932	Glenelg	155 (0)
Total		187

Representative team honours
Years	Team	Games (Goals)
	South Australia	29

Coaching career
Years	Club	Games (W–L–D)
1926–27, 1930–32	Glenelg	82 (24–58–0)
- ^{1} Playing statistics correct to the end of 1932.

Career highlights
- Glenelg best and fairest: 1925, 1929; Magarey Medalist: 1928; Magarey Medal runner-up: 1929; Glenelg Hall of Fame inductee: 2002; South Australian Football Hall of Fame inductee: 2002

Herbert Harry "Jim" Handby OBE (1 September 1903 – 2 October 1991) was an Australian rules footballer who played in the South Australian National Football League (SANFL) in the 1920s and 1930s, achieving several honours in recognition of his playing skills. He was later a federal Liberal politician and businessman.

Born Herbert Harry Handby in Adelaide, South Australia, Handby was invariably referred to simply as 'Jim'. Handby enjoyed a league football career at two SANFL clubs, achieving his greatest honours while featuring prominently in the development of the young Glenelg club.

In his early years Handby was more interested in playing Test cricket than in football, but he was quickly snapped up by South Adelaide and commenced his SAFL career in 1922. Although not a classically brilliant player, he displayed great perseverance and all round effectiveness. He was quickly recognised as one of the best defenders in South Australia, and in 1923 Handby made his debut at state-level football. Altogether he represented South Australia 29 times during his career.

Handby had been residing in Seacliff since 1922 and by 1924 wanted to join up with the new Glenelg club, who had lost all 42 of its games in its first three seasons. In April 1924 Handby was ruled to not possess qualification for the Bays, but by September even South Adelaide's leading player Dan Moriarty acknowledged Handby was leaving the blue and whites. On his Glenelg debut in 1925 Handby featured prominently in the club's first ever win, breaking an Australian rules-record 56-game losing streak. Handby won Glenelg's club champion award in 1925 and 1929, and won the SANFL's Magarey Medal in 1928 as the fairest and most brilliant player in the competition.

He was Glenelg's captain-coach in 1926 and 1927 but then relinquished this role until 1930, when he started a further three-year period as captain-coach. The best result he achieved as a coach was sixth in an eight-team competition in 1931.

After leaving football he became a publican and company director before being elected to Glenelg Council, and serving in the military from 1942 to 1945. In 1949, he was elected to the Australian House of Representatives as the Liberal member for the new seat of Kingston, defeating Labor member for Boothby Thomas Sheehy for the notionally Labor seat. He was defeated in 1951 by Labor's Pat Galvin and returned to his business career. He died in 1991.

== See also ==
- 1927 Melbourne Carnival

== Footnotes ==
Parliament of Australia
Preceded by New seat	Member for Kingston; 1949–1951	Succeeded by Pat Galvin
