= Kay Brownbill =

Australian politician (1914–2002)

Kay Brownbill OBE
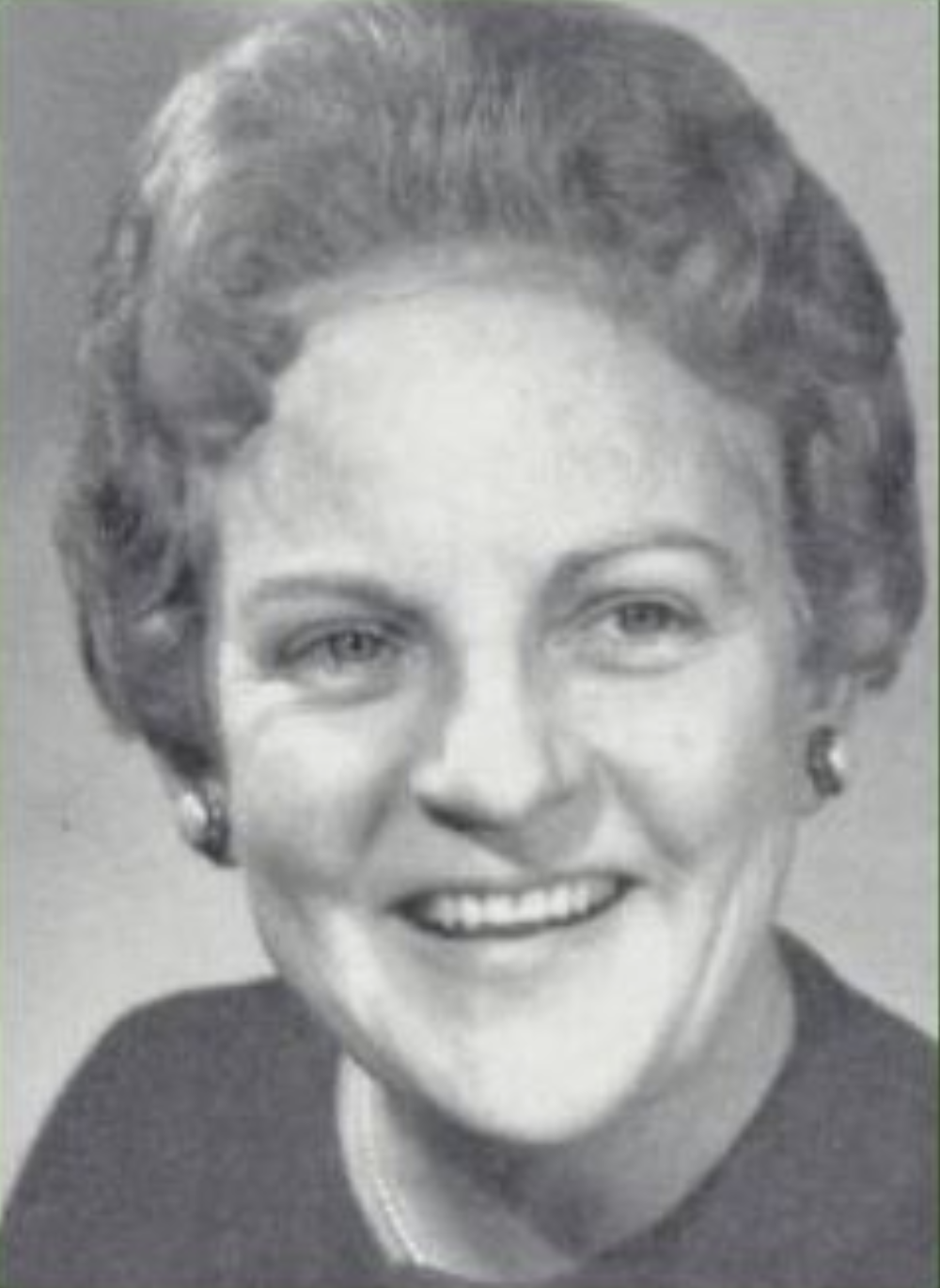

Member of the Australian Parliament for Kingston
- In office 26 November 1966 – 25 October 1969
- Preceded by: Pat Galvin
- Succeeded by: Richard Gun

Personal details
- Born: 21 July 1914 Adelaide, South Australia
- Died: 3 February 2002 (aged 87) Adelaide, South Australia
- Party: Liberal
- Education: Unley High School
- Occupation: Journalist, broadcaster

Kay Cathrine Millin Brownbill OBE (21 July 1914 – 3 February 2002) was an Australian media personality and politician. She was a playwright, journalist, radio and television presenter, writer, and publicist, working primarily in Adelaide. She was the first South Australian woman elected to the House of Representatives and the third overall, serving a single term from 1966 to 1969.

== Early life ==
Brownbill was born in Adelaide on 21 July 1914. She was a child actress under the name "Kitty Brownbill", making her debut on stage at the age of six, but gave up the theatre after injuring an ankle while dancing. She attended Unley High School and business colleges in Adelaide and Sydney, earning a certificate in home economics, and also took classes in English and public speaking at the University of Adelaide.

== Media career ==
At a young age, Brownbill began writing, producing, and acting in radio plays under the name "Cathrine Brownbill". Her plays were distributed by the Australian Broadcasting Corporation (ABC) and aired in Canada, New Zealand, India and South Africa. Her play "Sleep to Wake" – about Colonel William Light – won second prize in a competition run by The Advertiser and was performed at the celebrations marking the centenary of South Australia in 1938.

Brownbill briefly worked at radio station 2WG in Wagga Wagga before returning to Adelaide in 1939. She spent eight years at 5DN and 5RM, holding the title of "social editress" and helping expand the station's female listenership. Brownbill eventually moved to Sydney to work as an executive at 2GB, another Macquarie Network affiliate. In 1949, she moved to England for a year to study at a television school. Upon her return she was heralded by The News as "Australia's first television expert". She eventually transitioned to the field of public relations, and was deputy state president of the Public Relations Institute of Australia.

== Politics ==
Brownbill was active in the Liberal and Country League of South Australia, and first stood for the House of Representatives at the 1963 federal election. She ran in the Division of Kingston but the seat was retained by the sitting Labor member Pat Galvin. She reprised her candidacy in 1966, defeating Galvin with a 12.7-point swing as the Coalition won a landslide victory. Brownbill was the third woman elected to the House of Representatives, after Enid Lyons and Doris Blackburn, and the first from South Australia. She was the first woman elected to the House since 1949, and the first not to have been the widow of a previous member. At the time of her election she was the only South Australian woman in federal parliament, but she was joined by Senator Nancy Buttfield in July 1968.

Brownbill's maiden speech focused on the need to attract more overseas tourists to Australia, and she lobbied for the appointment of a woman to the board of the newly created Australian Tourist Commission. She served on the Printing Committee and the Joint Committee on the Broadcasting of Parliamentary Proceedings, and supported quotas for Australian content on radio and television. Her speeches showed "a keen interest in aircraft noise, foreign policy, social welfare reform and education". Her parliamentary career came to an end after a single term, as she lost her seat to Labor's Richard Gun at the 1969 election. It was not until 1987 that another South Australian woman, Elizabeth Harvey, was elected to the House of Representatives.

== Other activities ==
In 1962, Brownbill published a historical mystery novel titled Blow the Wind Southerly. Before and after her political career, she lectured in South Australian history at the University of Adelaide's Adult Education Department. She began working on a biography of artist Hans Heysen in 1963, but after her election to parliament she passed on her notes and tape-recordings to Colin Thiele who completed his own biography of Heysen.

Brownbill was appointed Officer of the Order of the British Empire (OBE) in the 1980 Queen's Birthday Honours. She died in Adelaide in February 2002, aged 87.

Parliament of Australia
Preceded by Pat Galvin	Member for Kingston; 1966–1969	Succeeded by Richard Gun
