= Pat Galvin =

Australian politician

Pat Galvin OBE
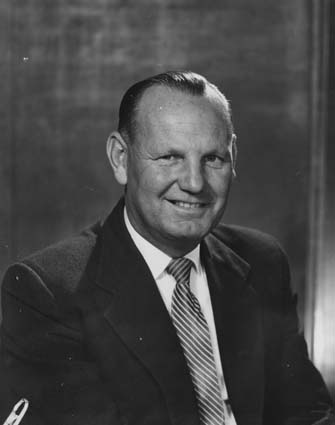

Member of the Australian Parliament for Kingston
- In office 28 April 1951 – 26 November 1966
- Preceded by: Jim Handby
- Succeeded by: Kay Brownbill

Personal details
- Born: Patrick Galvin; 30 March 1911 Quorn, South Australia
- Died: 24 September 1980 (aged 69)
- Party: Australian Labor Party
- Spouse: Queenie Galvin
- Children: Pat Galvin, Terry Galvin
- Education: Rostrevor College, Adelaide
- Occupation: Industrial officer

Patrick Galvin OBE (30 March 1911 – 24 September 1980) was an Australian politician.

== Biography ==
Born in Quorn, South Australia, he was educated at Rostrevor College. Galvin was an engineer by profession, but became involved in the trade union movement, rising to become South Australian state organiser of the Australian Society of Engineers in June 1947. In January 1948, he became state industrial officer of the Australian Workers' Union, in which capacity he was credited with resisting an attempt by the communist-dominated Miners' Federation to recruit AWU members at the Leigh Creek mine. Galvin was secretary and president of the Australian Labor Party's Glenelg electorate committee and was an AWU delegate to the party's state council.

In 1951, he was elected to the Australian House of Representatives as a member of the Labor Party, defeating Liberal MP Jim Handby for the seat of Kingston. He held the seat until 1966, when he was defeated by Liberal candidate Kay Brownbill. Galvin died in 1980.

Parliament of Australia
Preceded by Jim Handby	Member for Kingston; 1951–1966	Succeeded by Kay Brownbill
