= 1961 Australian House of Representatives election =

This is a list of electoral division results for the Australian 1961 federal election.

== Overall ==
This section is an excerpt from 1961 Australian federal election § House of Representatives

House of Reps (IRV) — 1961–63—Turnout 95.27% (CV) — Informal 2.57%
Party	Votes	%	Swing	Seats	Change
Labor	2,512,929	47.90	+5.09	62 (Note: Including Northern Territory and Australian Capital Territory)	+15
Liberal–Country coalition	2,208,213	42.09	–4.46	62	–15
Liberal	1,761,738	33.58	–3.65	45	–13
Country	446,475	8.51	–0.81	17	–2
Democratic Labor	399,475	7.61	–0.19	0	0
Queensland Labor	57,487	1.10	–0.50	0	0
Communist	25,429	0.48	–0.05	0	0
Commonwealth Centre	6,743	0.13	+0.13	0	0
Independents	35,757	0.68	+0.05	0	0
Total	5,246,033			122	
Two-party-preferred (estimated)
Liberal–Country coalition	Win	49.50	–4.60	62	–15
Labor		50.50	+4.60	60	+15

Popular vote
Labor	47.90%
Liberal	33.58%
DLP/QLP	8.71%
Country	8.51%
Other	1.29%

Two-party-preferred vote
Labor	50.50%
Coalition	49.50%

Parliament seats
Coalition	50.82%
Labor	49.18%

== New South Wales ==
1961 Australian federal election (New South Wales)
← 1958	9 December 1961	1963 →

All 46 NSW seats in the House of Representatives 23 seats needed for a majority
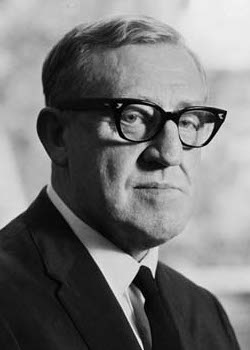

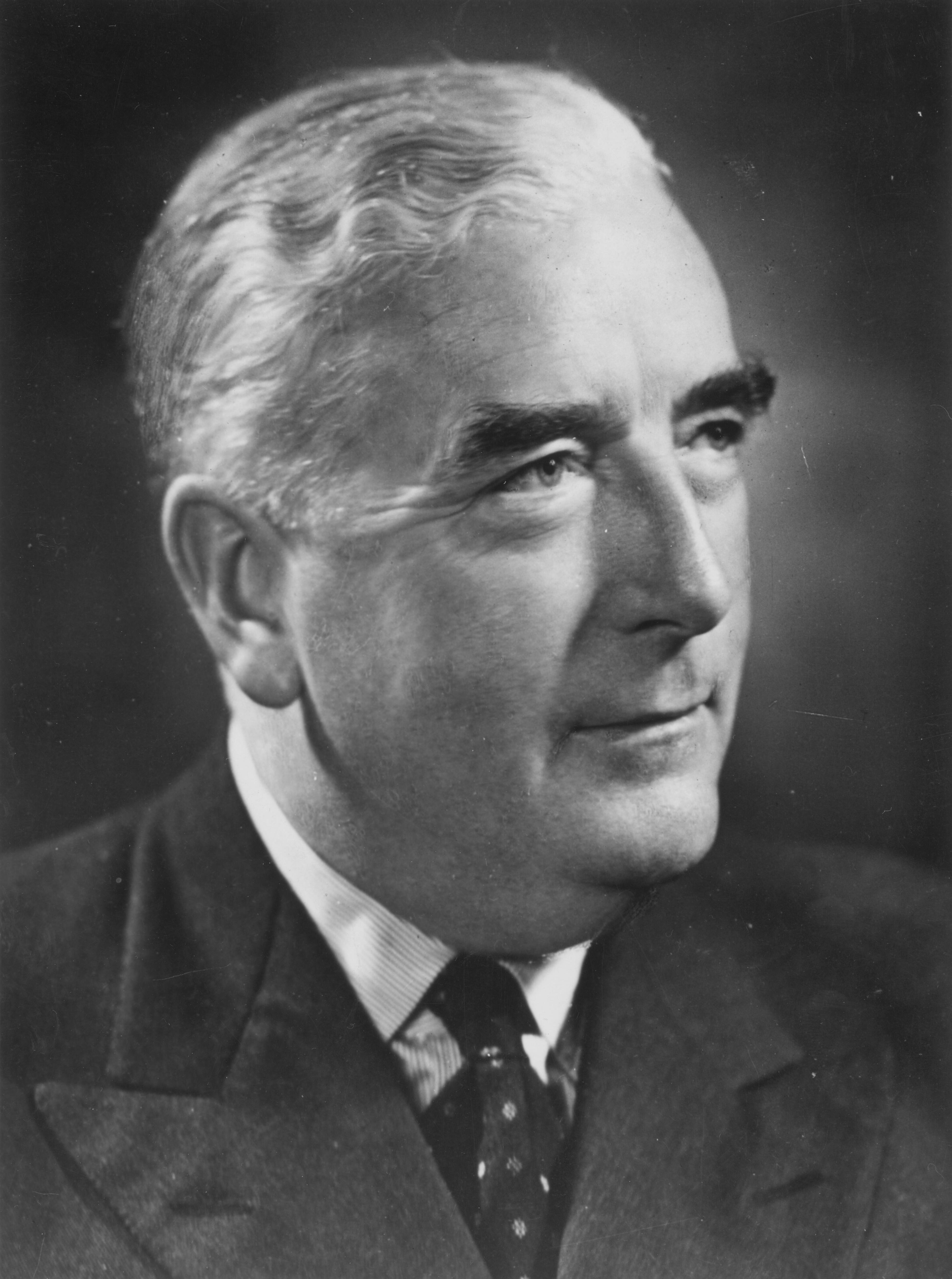
	First party	Second party
Leader	Arthur Calwell	Robert Menzies
Party	Labor	Coalition
Seats before	22	24
Seats won	27	19
Seat change	▲5	▼5
Popular vote	1,041,238	799,576
Percentage	52.2%	40.4%
Swing	▲5.1pp	▼5.1pp
TPP	54.8%	45.2%
TPP swing	▲5.0pp	▼5.0pp

=== Banks ===
This section is an excerpt from Electoral results for the Division of Banks § 1961

1961 Australian federal election: Banks
Party	Candidate	Votes	%	±%
Labor	Eric Costa	31,755	58.1	−0.1
Liberal	Jack Manning	14,244	26.1	−7.4
Independent	Russell Duncan	5,190	9.5	+9.5
Democratic Labor	John Antill	2,476	4.5	−0.5
Communist	Frank Bollins	945	1.7	−1.7
Total formal votes		54,610	96.6	
Informal votes		1,896	3.4	
Turnout		56,506	96.1	
Two-party-preferred result
Labor	Eric Costa		66.0	+3.7
Liberal	Jack Manning		34.0	−3.7
Labor hold		Swing	+3.7	

=== Barton ===
This section is an excerpt from Electoral results for the Division of Barton § 1961

1961 Australian federal election: Barton
Party	Candidate	Votes	%	±%
Labor	Len Reynolds	25,447	57.2	+7.9
Liberal	Colin Sullivan	16,672	37.5	−9.8
Democratic Labor	Thomas Bresnan	2,368	5.3	+1.9
Total formal votes		44,487	97.9	
Informal votes		958	2.1	
Turnout		45,445	95.9	
Two-party-preferred result
Labor	Len Reynolds		59.1	+8.8
Liberal	Colin Sullivan		40.9	−8.8
Labor hold		Swing	+8.8	

=== Bennelong ===
This section is an excerpt from Electoral results for the Division of Bennelong § 1961

1961 Australian federal election: Bennelong
Party	Candidate	Votes	%	±%
Labor	Harry Jensen	24,389	48.1	+7.5
Liberal	John Cramer	22,991	45.4	−9.3
Democratic Labor	Edward Beck	3,278	6.5	+2.9
Total formal votes		50,658	98.3	
Informal votes		872	1.7	
Turnout		51,530	96.2	
Two-party-preferred result
Liberal	John Cramer	26,745	50.8	−7.4
Labor	Harry Jensen	24,913	49.2	+7.4
Liberal hold		Swing	−7.4	

=== Blaxland ===
This section is an excerpt from Electoral results for the Division of Blaxland § 1961

1961 Australian federal election: Blaxland
Party	Candidate	Votes	%	±%
Labor	Jim Harrison	29,565	66.3	+2.6
Liberal	David Cowan	11,319	25.4	−2.1
Democratic Labor	Bernard Atkinson	3,742	8.4	−0.4
Total formal votes		44,626	97.0	
Informal votes		1,363	3.0	
Turnout		45,989	95.2	
Two-party-preferred result
Labor	Jim Harrison		67.8	+1.5
Liberal	David Cowan		32.2	−1.5
Labor hold		Swing	+1.5	

=== Bradfield ===
This section is an excerpt from Electoral results for the Division of Bradfield § 1961

1961 Australian federal election: Bradfield
Party	Candidate	Votes	%	±%
Liberal	Harry Turner	36,166	71.4	−4.3
Labor	Percy Staines	10,545	20.8	+4.6
Democratic Labor	Dominique Droulers	3,946	7.8	−0.3
Total formal votes		50,657	98.2	
Informal votes		946	1.8	
Turnout		51,603	95.3	
Two-party-preferred result
Liberal	Harry Turner		76.8	−4.6
Labor	Percy Staines		23.2	+4.6
Liberal hold		Swing	−4.6	

=== Calare ===
This section is an excerpt from Electoral results for the Division of Calare § 1961

1961 Australian federal election: Calare
Party	Candidate	Votes	%	±%
Country	John England	19,547	50.1	+50.1
Labor	Leroy Serisier	16,210	41.6	−0.3
Democratic Labor	George Boland	3,240	8.3	+8.3
Total formal votes		38,997	98.6	
Informal votes		551	1.4	
Turnout		39,548	96.0	
Two-party-preferred result
Country	John England		56.9	−1.2
Labor	Leroy Serisier		43.1	+1.2
Country hold		Swing	−1.2	

=== Cowper ===
This section is an excerpt from Electoral results for the Division of Cowper § 1961

1961 Australian federal election: Cowper
Party	Candidate	Votes	%	±%
Labor	Frank McGuren	17,567	45.9	+9.7
Country	Sir Earle Page	15,259	39.9	−14.9
Independent	Neville Weiley	5,435	14.2	+14.2
Total formal votes		38,261	98.1	
Informal votes		725	1.9	
Turnout		38,986	96.4	
Two-party-preferred result
Labor	Frank McGuren	19,803	51.8	+12.9
Country	Sir Earle Page	18,458	48.2	−12.9
Labor gain from Country		Swing	+12.9	

=== Cunningham ===
This section is an excerpt from Electoral results for the Division of Cunningham § 1961

1961 Australian federal election: Cunningham
Party	Candidate	Votes	%	±%
Labor	Victor Kearney	31,474	62.0	+4.2
Liberal	Jack Hough	17,422	34.3	−0.8
Communist	Bill McDougall	1,884	3.7	+0.6
Total formal votes		50,780	97.1	
Informal votes		1,532	2.9	
Turnout		52,312	95.5	
Two-party-preferred result
Labor	Victor Kearney		65.3	+3.9
Liberal	Jack Hough		34.7	−3.9
Labor hold		Swing	+3.9	

=== Dalley ===
This section is an excerpt from Electoral results for the Division of Dalley § 1961

1961 Australian federal election: Dalley
Party	Candidate	Votes	%	±%
Labor	William O'Connor	24,127	71.0	+0.0
Liberal	Arthur Nesbitt	6,343	18.7	−10.3
Democratic Labor	Reginald Lawson	2,331	6.9	+6.9
Communist	Mavis Robertson	1,172	3.4	+3.4
Total formal votes		33,973	95.9	
Informal votes		1,464	4.1	
Turnout		35,437	94.1	
Two-party-preferred result
Labor	William O'Connor		75.3	+4.3
Liberal	Arthur Nesbitt		24.7	−4.3
Labor hold		Swing	+4.3	

=== Darling ===
This section is an excerpt from Electoral results for the Division of Darling § 1961

1961 Australian federal election: Darling
Party	Candidate	Votes	%	±%
Labor	Joe Clark	25,235	72.6	+2.1
Country	Rodan Dawson	9,537	37.4	+1.7
Total formal votes		34,772	97.4	
Informal votes		918	2.6	
Turnout		35,690	93.6	
Labor hold		Swing	+0.2	

=== East Sydney ===
This section is an excerpt from Electoral results for the Division of East Sydney § 1961

1961 Australian federal election: East Sydney
Party	Candidate	Votes	%	±%
Labor	Eddie Ward	21,999	67.8	+4.6
Liberal	John Folbigg	7,137	22.0	−0.8
Democratic Labor	Joseph Bergin	2,276	7.0	+0.6
Communist	Bill Brown	1,030	3.2	−4.4
Total formal votes		32,442	96.3	
Informal votes		1,247	3.7	
Turnout		33,689	91.9	
Two-party-preferred result
Labor	Eddie Ward		71.9	+1.5
Liberal	John Folbigg		28.1	−1.5
Labor hold		Swing	+1.5	

=== Eden-Monaro ===
This section is an excerpt from Electoral results for the Division of Eden-Monaro § 1961

1961 Australian federal election: Eden-Monaro
Party	Candidate	Votes	%	±%
Labor	Allan Fraser	24,217	60.0	+6.3
Liberal	Douglas Thomson	16,134	40.0	−0.7
Total formal votes		40,351	98.7	
Informal votes		525	1.3	
Turnout		40,876	95.5	
Labor hold		Swing	+4.4	

=== Evans ===
This section is an excerpt from Electoral results for the Division of Evans § 1961

1961 Australian federal election: Evans
Party	Candidate	Votes	%	±%
Liberal	Frederick Osborne	17,623	46.1	−5.9
Labor	James Monaghan	17,305	45.3	+3.5
Democratic Labor	Francis Collins	2,580	6.8	+0.6
Independent	Harold O'Reilly	702	1.8	+1.8
Total formal votes		38,210	97.3	
Informal votes		1,051	2.7	
Turnout		39,261	95.0	
Two-party-preferred result
Labor	James Monaghan	19,141	50.1	+7.1
Liberal	Frederick Osborne	19,069	49.9	−7.1
Labor gain from Liberal		Swing	+7.1	

=== Farrer ===
This section is an excerpt from Electoral results for the Division of Farrer § 1961

1961 Australian federal election: Farrer
Party	Candidate	Votes	%	±%
Liberal	David Fairbairn	22,707	55.7	−2.4
Labor	Herb McPherson	13,899	34.1	+3.2
Democratic Labor	William Brennan	4,195	10.3	−0.7
Total formal votes		40,801	98.4	
Informal votes		678	1.6	
Turnout		41,479	96.2	
Two-party-preferred result
Liberal	David Fairbairn		64.1	−3.0
Labor	Herb McPherson		35.9	+3.0
Liberal hold		Swing	−3.0	

=== Grayndler ===
This section is an excerpt from Electoral results for the Division of Grayndler § 1961

1961 Australian federal election: Grayndler
Party	Candidate	Votes	%	±%
Labor	Fred Daly	22,329	67.2	+5.3
Liberal	Evan MacLaurin	7,872	23.7	−3.0
Communist	Hal Alexander	2,322	7.0	−0.3
Democratic Labor	Charles McCafferty	693	2.1	−1.2
Total formal votes		33,216	95.7	
Informal votes		1,491	4.3	
Turnout		34,707	93.5	
Two-party-preferred result
Labor	Fred Daly		74.0	+4.4
Liberal	Evan MacLaurin		26.0	−4.4
Labor hold		Swing	+4.4	

=== Gwydir ===
This section is an excerpt from Electoral results for the Division of Gwydir § 1961

1961 Australian federal election: Gwydir
Party	Candidate	Votes	%	±%
Country	Ian Allan	19,845	50.1	−4.9
Labor	Austin Heffernan	17,836	45.1	+0.1
Democratic Labor	Stanley Parmenter	1,901	4.8	+4.8
Total formal votes		39,582	98.4	
Informal votes		642	1.6	
Turnout		40,224	95.4	
Two-party-preferred result
Country	Ian Allan		53.9	−1.1
Labor	Austin Heffernan		46.1	+1.1
Country hold		Swing	−1.1	

=== Hughes ===
This section is an excerpt from Electoral results for the Division of Hughes § 1961

1961 Australian federal election: Hughes
Party	Candidate	Votes	%	±%
Labor	Les Johnson	37,113	59.2	+5.4
Liberal	Keith Woodward	22,399	35.7	−6.3
Democratic Labor	Wesley Johns	3,226	5.1	+0.9
Total formal votes		62,738	97.9	
Informal votes		1,324	2.1	
Turnout		64,062	96.3	
Two-party-preferred result
Labor	Les Johnson		61.0	+6.4
Liberal	Keith Woodward		39.0	−6.4
Labor hold		Swing	+6.4	

=== Hume ===
This section is an excerpt from Electoral results for the Division of Hume § 1961

1961 Australian federal election: Hume
Party	Candidate	Votes	%	±%
Labor	Arthur Fuller	18,858	48.6	+2.3
Country	Charles Anderson	16,682	43.0	−5.6
Democratic Labor	Charles Rowe	3,234	8.3	+3.3
Total formal votes		38,774	98.8	
Informal votes		488	1.2	
Turnout		39,262	96.5	
Two-party-preferred result
Labor	Arthur Fuller	19,738	50.9	+3.0
Country	Charles Anderson	19,036	49.1	−3.0
Labor gain from Country		Swing	+3.0	

=== Hunter ===
This section is an excerpt from Electoral results for the Division of Hunter § 1961

1961 Australian federal election: Hunter
Party	Candidate	Votes	%	±%
Labor	Bert James	33,435	75.5	+1.1
Liberal	Edward Farrell	8,337	18.8	+4.7
Communist	John Tapp	2,527	5.7	+5.7
Total formal votes		44,299	98.0	
Informal votes		894	2.0	
Turnout		45,193	96.1	
Two-party-preferred result
Labor	Bert James		80.6	+3.1
Liberal	Edward Farrell		19.4	−3.1
Labor hold		Swing	+3.1	

=== Kingsford Smith ===
This section is an excerpt from Electoral results for the Division of Kingsford Smith § 1961

1961 Australian federal election: Kingsford-Smith
Party	Candidate	Votes	%	±%
Labor	Dan Curtin	24,866	57.9	+1.7
Liberal	Jack Cunningham	14,963	34.8	−1.9
Democratic Labor	John Cunningham	3,120	7.3	+0.2
Total formal votes		42,949	97.2	
Informal votes		1,258	2.8	
Turnout		44,207	94.4	
Two-party-preferred result
Labor	Dan Curtin		59.4	+1.8
Liberal	Jack Cunningham		40.6	−1.8
Labor hold		Swing	+1.8	

=== Lang ===
This section is an excerpt from Electoral results for the Division of Lang § 1961

1961 Australian federal election: Lang
Party	Candidate	Votes	%	±%
Labor	Frank Stewart	28,379	64.0	+3.4
Liberal	Russell Carter	12,775	28.8	−6.2
Independent	Frank Ball	2,043	4.6	+4.6
Democratic Labor	Edward Byrnes	1,162	2.6	−1.8
Total formal votes		44,359	97.3	
Informal votes		1,228	2.7	
Turnout		45,587	95.4	
Two-party-preferred result
Labor	Frank Stewart		66.3	+4.8
Liberal	Russell Carter		32.7	−4.8
Labor hold		Swing	+4.8	

=== Lawson ===
This section is an excerpt from Electoral results for the Division of Lawson § 1961

1961 Australian federal election: Lawson
Party	Candidate	Votes	%	±%
Country	Laurie Failes	18,750	47.9	−1.8
Labor	John Canobi	18,156	46.4	+4.1
Democratic Labor	Denis Searls	2,239	5.7	−2.3
Total formal votes		39,145	98.4	
Informal votes		635	1.6	
Turnout		39,780	95.6	
Two-party-preferred result
Country	Laurie Failes	20,392	52.1	−3.9
Labor	John Canobi	18,753	47.9	+3.9
Country hold		Swing	−3.9	

=== Lowe ===
This section is an excerpt from Electoral results for the Division of Lowe § 1961

1961 Australian federal election: Lowe
Party	Candidate	Votes	%	±%
Liberal	William McMahon	18,472	47.8	−7.8
Labor	John Holland	18,285	47.3	+12.1
Democratic Labor	Denis Klein	1,846	3.8	−5.4
Republican	Daniel Smith	396	1.0	+1.0
Total formal votes		38,639	97.4	
Informal votes		1,035	2.6	
Turnout		39,674	94.8	
Two-party-preferred result
Liberal	William McMahon	19,660	50.9	−12.3
Labor	John Holland	18,979	49.1	+12.3
Liberal hold		Swing	−12.3	

=== Lyne ===
This section is an excerpt from Electoral results for the Division of Lyne § 1961

1961 Australian federal election: Lyne
Party	Candidate	Votes	%	±%
Country	Philip Lucock	22,599	54.4	+1.0
Labor	John Allan	16,295	39.2	+6.9
Democratic Labor	Jack Collins	1,971	4.7	+1.4
Independent	Joe Cordner	671	1.6	+0.2
Total formal votes		41,536	98.3	
Informal votes		711	1.7	
Turnout		42,247	96.5	
Two-party-preferred result
Country	Philip Lucock		59.0	−2.5
Labor	John Allan		41.0	+2.5
Country hold		Swing	−2.5	

=== Macarthur ===
This section is an excerpt from Electoral results for the Division of Macarthur § 1961

1961 Australian federal election: Macarthur
Party	Candidate	Votes	%	±%
Liberal	Jeff Bate	27,532	53.0	−6.3
Labor	Don Nilon	24,383	47.0	+6.3
Total formal votes		51,915	98.1	
Informal votes		985	1.9	
Turnout		52,900	95.1	
Liberal hold		Swing	−6.3	

=== Mackellar ===
This section is an excerpt from Electoral results for the Division of Mackellar § 1961

1961 Australian federal election: Mackellar
Party	Candidate	Votes	%	±%
Liberal	Bill Wentworth	29,248	54.1	−4.9
Labor	Mabel Elliott	18,872	34.9	+4.6
Democratic Labor	Philip Cohen	2,983	5.5	+0.8
Communist	Hugh Begg	2,971	5.5	−0.4
Total formal votes		54,074	97.5	
Informal votes		1,382	2.5	
Turnout		55,456	94.6	
Two-party-preferred result
Liberal	Bill Wentworth		58.9	−4.4
Labor	Mabel Elliott		41.1	+4.4
Liberal hold		Swing	−4.4	

=== Macquarie ===
This section is an excerpt from Electoral results for the Division of Macquarie § 1961

1961 Australian federal election: Macquarie
Party	Candidate	Votes	%	±%
Labor	Tony Luchetti	26,803	63.1	+5.0
Liberal	John Heesh	13,583	32.0	−3.5
Democratic Labor	Frank Mackenzie	2,063	4.9	−1.5
Total formal votes		42,449	97.7	
Informal votes		989	2.3	
Turnout		43,438	95.8	
Two-party-preferred result
Labor	Tony Luchetti		64.1	+4.9
Liberal	John Heesh		35.9	−4.9
Labor hold		Swing	+4.9	

=== Mitchell ===
This section is an excerpt from Electoral results for the Division of Mitchell § 1961

1961 Australian federal election: Mitchell
Party	Candidate	Votes	%	±%
Labor	John Armitage	36,363	52.2	+11.0
Liberal	Roy Wheeler	29,887	42.9	−11.7
Democratic Labor	Allan Dwyer	3,011	4.3	+0.1
Independent	John Mantova	404	0.6	+0.6
Total formal votes		69,665	97.4	
Informal votes		1,854	2.6	
Turnout		71,519	94.9	
Two-party-preferred result
Labor	John Armitage		53.4	+11.4
Liberal	Roy Wheeler		46.6	−11.4
Labor gain from Liberal		Swing	+11.4	

=== New England ===
This section is an excerpt from Electoral results for the Division of New England § 1961

1961 Australian federal election: New England
Party	Candidate	Votes	%	±%
Country	David Drummond	21,086	53.8	−5.8
Labor	Donald White	15,929	40.7	+8.9
Democratic Labor	John Burless	2,143	5.5	−3.1
Total formal votes		39,158	98.2	
Informal votes		700	1.8	
Turnout		39,858	95.6	
Two-party-preferred result
Country	David Drummond		58.4	−8.3
Labor	Donald White		41.6	+8.3
Country hold		Swing	−8.3	

=== Newcastle ===
This section is an excerpt from Electoral results for the Division of Newcastle1961

1961 Australian federal election: Newcastle
Party	Candidate	Votes	%	±%
Labor	Charles Jones	23,315	62.8	+2.9
Liberal	Henry Wansey	10,488	28.2	−1.4
Democratic Labor	Hugh Ansell	3,330	9.0	+0.7
Total formal votes		37,133	97.7	
Informal votes		878	2.3	
Turnout		38,011	95.6	
Two-party-preferred result
Labor	Charles Jones		65.4	+2.0
Liberal	Henry Wansey		34.6	−2.0
Labor hold		Swing	+2.0	

=== North Sydney ===
This section is an excerpt from Electoral results for the Division of North Sydney § 1961

1961 Australian federal election: North Sydney
Party	Candidate	Votes	%	±%
Liberal	William Jack	18,959	49.7	−7.4
Labor	Maurice Isaacs	15,610	40.9	+6.7
Democratic Labor	Michael Fitzpatrick	3,575	9.4	+1.8
Total formal votes		38,144	97.9	
Informal votes		805	2.1	
Turnout		38,949	94.3	
Two-party-preferred result
Liberal	William Jack	20,608	54.0	−9.7
Labor	Maurice Isaacs	17,536	46.0	+9.7
Liberal hold		Swing	−9.7	

=== Parkes ===
This section is an excerpt from Electoral results for the Division of Parkes (1901–1969) § 1961

1961 Australian federal election: Parkes
Party	Candidate	Votes	%	±%
Labor	Les Haylen	20,352	52.5	+2.6
Liberal	William Dowd	14,675	37.9	−7.2
Democratic Labor	Vincent Couch	3,725	9.6	+4.6
Total formal votes		38,752	97.3	
Informal votes		1,079	2.7	
Turnout		39,831	95.0	
Two-party-preferred result
Labor	Les Haylen		54.2	+3.2
Liberal	William Dowd		45.8	−3.2
Labor hold		Swing	+3.2	

=== Parramatta ===
This section is an excerpt from Electoral results for the Division of Parramatta § 1961

1961 Australian federal election: Parramatta
Party	Candidate	Votes	%	±%
Liberal	Sir Garfield Barwick	26,200	50.1	−6.7
Labor	Maxwell McLaren	22,401	42.8	+3.1
Democratic Labor	Reginald Andrews	2,936	5.6	+2.1
Communist	Matt Munro	771	1.5	+1.5
Total formal votes		52,308	97.7	
Informal votes		1,256	2.3	
Turnout		53,564	95.5	
Two-party-preferred result
Liberal	Sir Garfield Barwick		55.0	−4.6
Labor	Maxwell McLaren		45.0	+4.6
Liberal hold		Swing	−4.6	

=== Paterson ===
This section is an excerpt from Electoral results for the Division of Paterson § 1961

1961 Australian federal election: Paterson
Party	Candidate	Votes	%	±%
Liberal	Allen Fairhall	20,155	50.9	−2.7
Labor	Bob Brown	16,952	42.8	+6.5
Democratic Labor	Aubrey Barr	2,490	6.3	−3.8
Total formal votes		39,597	98.2	
Informal votes		733	1.8	
Turnout		40,330	96.3	
Two-party-preferred result
Liberal	Allen Fairhall		55.1	−6.8
Labor	Bob Brown		44.9	+6.8
Liberal hold		Swing	−6.8	

=== Phillip ===
This section is an excerpt from Electoral results for the Division of Phillip § 1961

1961 Australian federal election: Phillip
Party	Candidate	Votes	%	±%
Labor	Syd Einfeld	19,094	50.3	+4.1
Liberal	William Aston	16,741	44.1	−3.0
Democratic Labor	Peter Daly	2,102	5.5	+0.0
Total formal votes		37,937	97.3	
Informal votes		1,061	2.7	
Turnout		38,998	93.7	
Two-party-preferred result
Labor	Syd Einfeld		51.4	+3.3
Liberal	William Aston		48.6	−3.3
Labor gain from Liberal		Swing	+3.3	

=== Reid ===
This section is an excerpt from Electoral results for the Division of Reid § 1961

1961 Australian federal election: Reid
Party	Candidate	Votes	%	±%
Labor	Tom Uren	34,867	66.1	+17.0
Liberal	Jack Cook	11,959	22.7	−3.7
Democratic Labor	Mick Carroll	5,885	11.2	+8.2
Total formal votes		52,711	96.8	
Informal votes		1,743	3.2	
Turnout		54,454	95.3	
Two-party-preferred result
Labor	Tom Uren		68.1	+4.0
Liberal	Jack Cook		31.9	−4.0
Labor hold		Swing	+4.0	

=== Richmond ===
This section is an excerpt from Electoral results for the Division of Richmond § 1961

1961 Australian federal election: Richmond
Party	Candidate	Votes	%	±%
Country	Doug Anthony	25,301	63.9	−5.9
Labor	Raymond Freeman	14,318	36.1	+9.2
Total formal votes		39,619	98.8	
Informal votes		488	1.2	
Turnout		40,107	95.4	
Country hold		Swing	−7.6	

=== Riverina ===
This section is an excerpt from Electoral results for the Division of Riverina § 1961

1961 Australian federal election: Riverina
Party	Candidate	Votes	%	±%
Country	Hugh Roberton	18,838	47.8	−6.0
Labor	Jack Ward	17,622	44.7	+4.4
Democratic Labor	Albert Elrington	2,988	7.6	+1.6
Total formal votes		39,448	98.2	
Informal votes		714	1.8	
Turnout		40,162	94.9	
Two-party-preferred result
Country	Hugh Roberton	21,331	54.1	−4.5
Labor	Jack Ward	18,117	45.9	+4.5
Country hold		Swing	−4.5	

=== Robertson ===
This section is an excerpt from Electoral results for the Division of Robertson § 1961

1961 Australian federal election: Robertson
Party	Candidate	Votes	%	±%
Liberal	Roger Dean	23,760	48.5	−5.4
Labor	Tom Pendlebury	23,065	47.0	+5.0
Democratic Labor	Neil Mackerras	2,211	4.5	+0.4
Total formal votes		49,036	97.8	
Informal votes		1,079	2.2	
Turnout		50,115	95.3	
Two-party-preferred result
Liberal	Roger Dean	25,258	51.5	−5.7
Labor	Tom Pendlebury	23,778	48.5	+5.7
Liberal hold		Swing	−5.7	

=== Shortland ===
This section is an excerpt from Electoral results for the Division of Shortland § 1961

1961 Australian federal election: Shortland
Party	Candidate	Votes	%	±%
Labor	Charles Griffiths	32,127	64.8	+3.8
Liberal	Allan Pitts	12,100	24.4	−2.0
Democratic Labor	Robert Burke	4,047	8.2	−0.9
Communist	Geoff Curthoys	1,341	2.7	−0.8
Total formal votes		49,615	97.2	
Informal votes		1,410	2.8	
Turnout		51,025	96.3	
Two-party-preferred result
Labor	Charles Griffiths		69.6	+3.9
Liberal	Allan Pitts		30.4	−3.9
Labor hold		Swing	+3.9	

=== St George ===
This section is an excerpt from Electoral results for the Division of St George § 1961

1961 Australian federal election: St George
Party	Candidate	Votes	%	±%
Labor	Lionel Clay	22,468	54.2	+5.1
Liberal	Clifford Amos	17,580	42.4	−4.7
Democratic Labor	Malcolm Towner	1,433	3.5	−0.3
Total formal votes		41,481	97.7	
Informal votes		978	2.3	
Turnout		42,459	95.9	
Two-party-preferred result
Labor	Lionel Clay		54.9	+4.8
Liberal	Clifford Amos		45.1	−4.8
Labor hold		Swing	+4.8	

=== Warringah ===
This section is an excerpt from Electoral results for the Division of Warringah § 1961

1961 Australian federal election: Warringah
Party	Candidate	Votes	%	±%
Liberal	John Cockle	22,489	53.6	−19.5
Labor	James Brown	9,706	23.1	+3.8
Independent Liberal	Russel Whybrow	4,322	10.3	+10.3
Independent Liberal	Rex Benson	3,484	8.3	+8.3
Democratic Labor	John Plunkett	1,972	4.7	−2.9
Total formal votes		41,973	97.1	
Informal votes		1,234	2.9	
Turnout		43,207	94.5	
Two-party-preferred result
Liberal	John Cockle		66.1	−13.1
Labor	James Brown		33.9	+13.1
Liberal hold		Swing	−13.1	

=== Watson ===
This section is an excerpt from Electoral results for the Division of Watson (1934–1969) § 1961

1961 Australian federal election: Watson
Party	Candidate	Votes	%	±%
Labor	Jim Cope	29,079	80.1	+9.1
Liberal	Sidney Pitkethly	6,134	16.9	−8.2
Democratic Labor	Mary Nappa	1,081	3.0	−0.9
Total formal votes		36,294	97.0	
Informal votes		1,141	3.0	
Turnout		37,435	94.7	
Two-party-preferred result
Labor	Jim Cope		80.7	+8.9
Liberal	Sidney Pitkethly		19.3	−8.9
Labor hold		Swing	+8.9	

=== Wentworth ===
This section is an excerpt from Electoral results for the Division of Wentworth § 1961

1961 Australian federal election: Wentworth
Party	Candidate	Votes	%	±%
Liberal	Les Bury	23,084	62.5	−6.7
Labor	John Hirshman	10,536	28.5	+5.3
Democratic Labor	Francis Bull	3,313	9.0	+1.4
Total formal votes		36,933	97.4	
Informal votes		999	2.6	
Turnout		37,932	93.5	
Two-party-preferred result
Liberal	Les Bury		69.9	−5.4
Labor	John Hirshman		30.1	+5.4
Liberal hold		Swing	−5.4	

=== Werriwa ===
This section is an excerpt from Electoral results for the Division of Werriwa § 1961

1961 Australian federal election: Werriwa
Party	Candidate	Votes	%	±%
Labor	Gough Whitlam	36,153	65.3	+8.9
Liberal	Vernon Luckman	14,427	26.1	−6.6
Democratic Labor	Kevin Davis	4,792	8.7	−2.3
Total formal votes		55,372	96.3	
Informal votes		2,119	3.7	
Turnout		57,491	94.5	
Two-party-preferred result
Labor	Gough Whitlam		66.8	+8.4
Liberal	Vernon Luckman		33.2	−8.4
Labor hold		Swing	+8.4	

=== West Sydney ===
This section is an excerpt from Electoral results for the Division of West Sydney § 1961

1961 Australian federal election: West Sydney
Party	Candidate	Votes	%	±%
Labor	Dan Minogue	21,937	70.4	+4.7
Liberal	Milovan Kovjanic	4,555	14.6	−4.4
Democratic Labor	William Doherty	2,927	9.4	−1.5
Communist	Ron Maxwell	1,746	5.6	+1.3
Total formal votes		31,165	95.5	
Informal votes		1,477	4.5	
Turnout		32,642	91.1	
Two-party-preferred result
Labor	Dan Minogue		76.5	+4.9
Liberal	Milovan Kovjanic		24.5	−4.9
Labor hold		Swing	+4.9	

== Victoria ==
1961 Australian federal election (Victoria)
← 1958	9 December 1961	1963 →

All 33 Victorian seats in the House of Representatives 17 seats needed for a majority
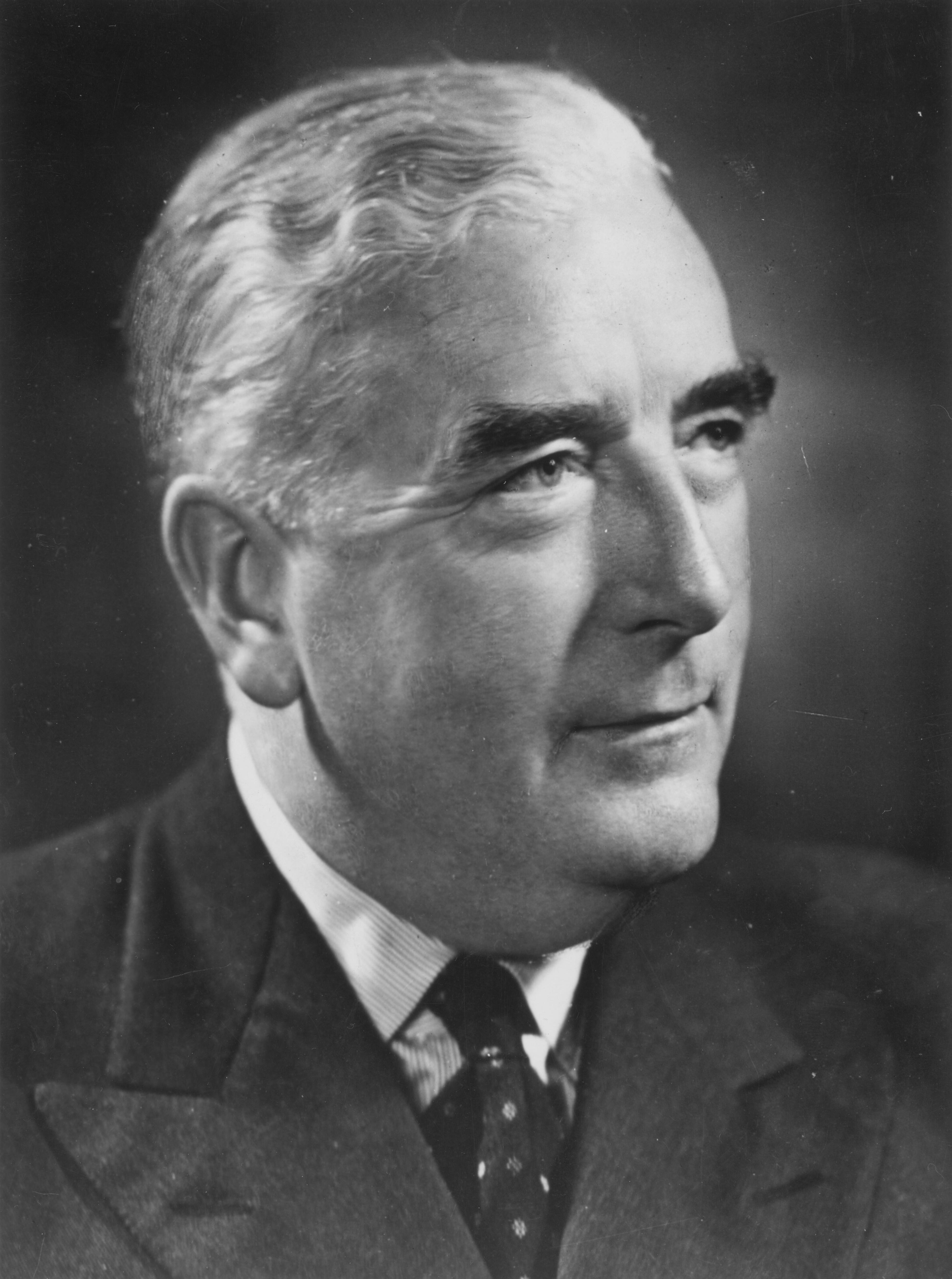

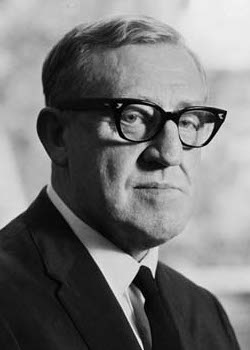
	First party	Second party
Leader	Robert Menzies	Arthur Calwell
Party	Coalition	Labor
Seats before	23	10
Seats won	23	10
Seat change	Steady	Steady
Popular vote	627,429	615,693
Percentage	42.3%	41.6%
Swing	▼2.9pp	▲2.1pp
TPP	55.2%	44.5%
TPP swing	▼2.2pp	▲2.2pp

=== Balaclava ===
This section is an excerpt from Electoral results for the Division of Balaclava § 1961

1961 Australian federal election: Balaclava
Party	Candidate	Votes	%	±%
Liberal	Ray Whittorn	20,517	51.9	−9.2
Labor	Ernst Platz	11,892	30.1	+4.8
Democratic Labor	John Ryan	5,333	13.5	+1.5
Republican	John Murray	1,780	4.5	+4.5
Total formal votes		39,522	97.8	
Informal votes		888	2.2	
Turnout		40,410	95.7	
Two-party-preferred result
Liberal	Ray Whittorn		65.8	−6.9
Labor	Ernst Platz		34.2	+6.9
Liberal hold		Swing	−6.9	

=== Ballaarat ===
This section is an excerpt from Electoral results for the Division of Ballarat § 1961

1961 Australian federal election: Ballaarat
Party	Candidate	Votes	%	±%
Liberal	Dudley Erwin	18,379	43.6	+3.7
Labor	Aubrey Keane	16,224	38.5	−4.3
Democratic Labor	Bob Joshua	7,557	17.9	+0.7
Total formal votes		42,160	98.6	
Informal votes		613	1.4	
Turnout		42,773	96.8	
Two-party-preferred result
Liberal	Dudley Erwin	25,240	59.9	+4.5
Labor	Aubrey Keane	16,920	40.1	−4.5
Liberal hold		Swing	+4.5	

=== Batman ===
This section is an excerpt from Electoral results for the Division of Batman § 1961

1961 Australian federal election: Batman
Party	Candidate	Votes	%	±%
Labor	Alan Bird	22,831	54.9	+3.4
Liberal	Bruce Skeggs	12,753	30.7	−3.2
Democratic Labor	Maurice Keady	5,970	14.4	−0.2
Total formal votes		41,554	97.8	
Informal votes		941	2.2	
Turnout		42,495	95.6	
Two-party-preferred result
Labor	Alan Bird		55.4	+2.4
Liberal	Bruce Skeggs		44.6	−2.4
Labor hold		Swing	+2.4	

=== Bendigo ===
This section is an excerpt from Electoral results for the Division of Bendigo § 1961

1961 Australian federal election: Bendigo
Party	Candidate	Votes	%	±%
Labor	Noel Beaton	22,511	51.6	+3.1
Liberal	Henry Snell	14,928	34.2	−4.2
Democratic Labor	Ronald Anderson	5,895	13.5	+0.4
Independent	Milan Lorman	308	0.7	+0.7
Total formal votes		43,642	98.6	
Informal votes		606	1.4	
Turnout		44,248	96.8	
Two-party-preferred result
Labor	Noel Beaton		54.2	+3.9
Liberal	Henry Snell		45.8	−3.9
Labor hold		Swing	+3.9	

=== Bruce ===
This section is an excerpt from Electoral results for the Division of Bruce § 1961

1961 Australian federal election: Bruce
Party	Candidate	Votes	%	±%
Labor	Keith Ewert	34,741	42.7	+2.4
Liberal	Billy Snedden	33,882	41.6	−4.5
Democratic Labor	Henri de Sachau	12,826	15.7	+2.1
Total formal votes		81,449	98.0	
Informal votes		1,671	2.0	
Turnout		83,120	95.3	
Two-party-preferred result
Liberal	Billy Snedden	42,543	52.2	−2.3
Labor	Keith Ewert	38,906	47.8	+2.3
Liberal hold		Swing	−2.3	

=== Chisholm ===
This section is an excerpt from Electoral results for the Division of Chisholm § 1961

1961 Australian federal election: Chisholm
Party	Candidate	Votes	%	±%
Liberal	Sir Wilfrid Kent Hughes	22,276	55.6	−4.4
Labor	Malcolm Coughlin	12,524	31.3	+2.6
Democratic Labor	John Duffy	5,273	13.2	+1.9
Total formal votes		40,073	98.4	
Informal votes		658	1.6	
Turnout		40,731	95.3	
Two-party-preferred result
Liberal	Sir Wilfrid Kent Hughes		67.5	−2.7
Labor	Malcolm Coughlin		32.5	+2.7
Liberal hold		Swing	−2.7	

=== Corangamite ===
This section is an excerpt from Electoral results for the Division of Corangamite § 1961

1961 Australian federal election: Corangamite
Party	Candidate	Votes	%	±%
Liberal	Dan Mackinnon	23,319	52.8	−1.0
Labor	Desmond Hulme	12,829	29.0	+2.3
Democratic Labor	Patrick Bourke	8,032	18.2	+0.4
Total formal votes		44,180	98.5	
Informal votes		668	1.5	
Turnout		44,848	96.9	
Two-party-preferred result
Liberal	Dan Mackinnon		68.3	−2.4
Labor	Desmond Hulme		31.7	+2.4
Liberal hold		Swing	−2.4	

=== Corio ===
This section is an excerpt from Electoral results for the Division of Corio § 1961

1961 Australian federal election: Corio
Party	Candidate	Votes	%	±%
Liberal	Hubert Opperman	19,790	43.3	−3.9
Labor	Lindsay Romey	19,149	41.9	+3.0
Democratic Labor	James Mahoney	6,791	14.9	+1.0
Total formal votes		45,730	98.1	
Informal votes		864	1.9	
Turnout		46,594	95.4	
Two-party-preferred result
Liberal	Hubert Opperman	25,810	56.4	−0.3
Labor	Lindsay Romey	19,920	43.6	+0.3
Liberal hold		Swing	−0.3	

=== Darebin ===
This section is an excerpt from Electoral results for the Division of Darebin § 1961

1961 Australian federal election: Darebin
Party	Candidate	Votes	%	±%
Labor	Frank Courtnay	28,285	55.2	+4.1
Democratic Labor	Tom Andrews	11,767	22.9	−0.8
Liberal	John Wyss	11,228	21.9	−3.2
Total formal votes		51,280	97.7	
Informal votes		1,207	2.3	
Turnout		52,487	95.9	
Two-party-preferred result
Labor	Frank Courtnay		57.4	+3.0
Democratic Labor	Tom Andrews		42.6	+42.6
Labor hold		Swing	+3.0	

=== Deakin ===
This section is an excerpt from Electoral results for the Division of Deakin § 1961

1961 Australian federal election: Deakin
Party	Candidate	Votes	%	±%
Liberal	Frank Davis	28,392	47.3	−3.1
Labor	George Slater	23,839	39.7	+4.2
Democratic Labor	Maurice Weston	7,802	13.0	−1.0
Total formal votes		60,033	98.3	
Informal votes		1,040	1.7	
Turnout		61,073	95.7	
Two-party-preferred result
Liberal	Frank Davis	34,955	58.2	−4.9
Labor	George Slater	25,078	41.8	+4.9
Liberal hold		Swing	−4.9	

=== Fawkner ===
This section is an excerpt from Electoral results for the Division of Fawkner § 1961

1961 Australian federal election: Fawkner
Party	Candidate	Votes	%	±%
Liberal	Peter Howson	16,580	48.6	+0.3
Labor	Gwendolyn Noad	12,223	35.8	+2.9
Democratic Labor	Richard Coyne	5,336	15.6	−3.1
Total formal votes		34,139	97.2	
Informal votes		987	2.8	
Turnout		35,126	93.0	
Two-party-preferred result
Liberal	Peter Howson	21,438	62.8	−2.0
Labor	Gwendolyn Noad	12,701	37.2	+2.0
Liberal hold		Swing	−2.0	

=== Flinders ===
This section is an excerpt from Electoral results for the Division of Flinders § 1961

1961 Australian federal election: Flinders
Party	Candidate	Votes	%	±%
Liberal	Robert Lindsay	23,251	44.5	−6.1
Labor	Ian Cathie	19,466	37.3	−1.9
Democratic Labor	Jack Austin	7,717	14.8	+4.6
Independent	Edmund Knowles	1,796	3.4	+3.4
Total formal votes		52,230	97.7	
Informal votes		1,237	2.3	
Turnout		53,467	95.1	
Two-party-preferred result
Liberal	Robert Lindsay	29,916	57.3	−2.5
Labor	Ian Cathie	22,314	42.7	+2.5
Liberal hold		Swing	−2.5	

=== Gellibrand ===
This section is an excerpt from Electoral results for the Division of Gellibrand § 1961

1961 Australian federal election: Gellibrand
Party	Candidate	Votes	%	±%
Labor	Hector McIvor	25,634	65.1	+2.1
Liberal	Reginald Cannon	8,031	20.4	+2.3
Democratic Labor	Jan Roszkowski	4,691	11.9	−5.1
Communist	Frank Johnson	1,000	2.5	+0.6
Total formal votes		39,356	96.5	
Informal votes		1,439	3.5	
Turnout		40,795	96.2	
Two-party-preferred result
Labor	Hector McIvor		68.5	+2.0
Liberal	Reginald Cannon		31.5	−2.0
Labor hold		Swing	+2.0	

=== Gippsland ===
This section is an excerpt from Electoral results for the Division of Gippsland § 1961

1961 Australian federal election: Gippsland
Party	Candidate	Votes	%	±%
Country	Peter Nixon	22,002	51.6	−6.7
Labor	William Stephenson	13,430	31.5	+4.0
Democratic Labor	John Hansen	7,209	16.9	+2.8
Total formal votes		42,641	98.5	
Informal votes		671	1.5	
Turnout		43,312	95.3	
Two-party-preferred result
Country	Peter Nixon		66.9	−4.1
Labor	William Stephenson		33.1	+4.1
Country hold		Swing	−4.1	

=== Henty ===
This section is an excerpt from Electoral results for the Division of Henty § 1961

1961 Australian federal election: Henty
Party	Candidate	Votes	%	±%
Liberal	Max Fox	21,011	45.9	−4.6
Labor	Sir George Jones	18,416	40.3	+3.7
Democratic Labor	Henry Moore	6,302	13.8	+0.9
Total formal votes		45,729	98.2	
Informal votes		856	1.8	
Turnout		46,585	96.0	
Two-party-preferred result
Liberal	Max Fox	26,377	57.7	−4.4
Labor	Sir George Jones	19,352	42.3	+4.4
Liberal hold		Swing	−4.4	

=== Higgins ===
This section is an excerpt from Electoral results for the Division of Higgins § 1961

1961 Australian federal election: Higgins
Party	Candidate	Votes	%	±%
Liberal	Harold Holt	22,004	56.7	−6.5
Labor	Roger Kirby	11,353	29.3	+4.6
Democratic Labor	Celia Laird	5,428	14.0	+1.9
Total formal votes		38,785	98.1	
Informal votes		753	1.9	
Turnout		39,538	96.4	
Two-party-preferred result
Liberal	Harold Holt		69.3	−4.8
Labor	Roger Kirby		30.7	+4.8
Liberal hold		Swing	−4.8	

=== Higinbotham ===
This section is an excerpt from Electoral results for the Division of Higinbotham § 1961

1961 Australian federal election: Higinbotham
Party	Candidate	Votes	%	±%
Liberal	Don Chipp	24,525	43.7	−5.8
Labor	Henry Fowler	22,991	41.0	+1.8
Democratic Labor	William Cameron	8,588	15.3	+4.0
Total formal votes		56,104	98.6	
Informal votes		796	1.4	
Turnout		56,900	96.9	
Two-party-preferred result
Liberal	Don Chipp	32,453	57.8	−2.0
Labor	Henry Fowler	23,651	42.2	+2.0
Liberal hold		Swing	−2.0	

=== Indi ===
This section is an excerpt from Electoral results for the Division of Indi § 1961

1961 Australian federal election: Indi
Party	Candidate	Votes	%	±%
Country	Mac Holten	18,654	44.4	+13.5
Labor	Mervyn Huggins	10,637	25.3	−2.1
Liberal	Malcolm Cameron	7,962	18.9	−11.7
Democratic Labor	George Taylor	4,795	11.4	−2.1
Total formal votes		42,048	98.3	
Informal votes		713	1.7	
Turnout		42,761	96.1	
Two-party-preferred result
Country	Mac Holten	22,753	54.1	−2.4
Liberal	Malcolm Cameron	19,295	45.9	+2.4
Country hold		Swing	−2.4	

=== Isaacs ===
This section is an excerpt from Electoral results for the Division of Isaacs (1949–1969) § 1961

1961 Australian federal election: Isaacs
Party	Candidate	Votes	%	±%
Liberal	William Haworth	16,493	47.4	+2.0
Labor	Angus McLean	13,527	38.9	+3.4
Democratic Labor	John Hughes	4,781	13.7	+1.8
Total formal votes		34,801	97.0	
Informal votes		1,058	3.0	
Turnout		35,859	91.6	
Two-party-preferred result
Liberal	William Haworth	20,724	59.6	−1.8
Labor	Angus McLean	14,077	40.4	+1.8
Liberal hold		Swing	−1.8	

=== Kooyong ===
This section is an excerpt from Electoral results for the Division of Kooyong § 1961

1961 Australian federal election: Kooyong
Party	Candidate	Votes	%	±%
Liberal	Robert Menzies	26,328	57.3	−6.1
Labor	Moss Cass	11,938	26.0	+3.8
Democratic Labor	Thomas Brennan	6,968	15.2	+1.8
Communist	Bill Tregear	458	1.0	−0.1
Independent	Goldie Collins	237	0.5	+0.5
Total formal votes		45,929	97.8	
Informal votes		1,043	2.2	
Turnout		46,972	95.3	
Two-party-preferred result
Liberal	Robert Menzies		70.4	−4.3
Labor	Moss Cass		29.6	+4.3
Liberal hold		Swing	−4.3	

=== La Trobe ===
This section is an excerpt from Electoral results for the Division of La Trobe § 1961

1961 Australian federal election: La Trobe
Party	Candidate	Votes	%	±%
Liberal	John Jess	27,952	43.7	−10.0
Labor	Don Pritchard	26,875	42.0	+5.1
Democratic Labor	John Hoare	8,651	13.5	+4.2
Centre	Bernard Rees	554	0.9	+0.9
Total formal votes		64,032	97.9	
Informal votes		1,344	2.1	
Turnout		65,376	96.3	
Two-party-preferred result
Liberal	John Jess	36,236	56.6	−5.5
Labor	Don Pritchard	27,797	43.4	+5.5
Liberal hold		Swing	−5.5	

=== Lalor ===
This section is an excerpt from Electoral results for the Division of Lalor § 1961

1961 Australian federal election: Lalor
Party	Candidate	Votes	%	±%
Labor	Reg Pollard	42,906	53.9	+2.7
Liberal	Peter Kemp	19,324	24.3	−5.4
Democratic Labor	John Donnellon	12,870	16.2	−2.8
Centre	Kenneth Agius	4,431	5.6	+5.6
Total formal votes		79,531	96.9	
Informal votes		2,539	3.1	
Turnout		82,070	94.9	
Two-party-preferred result
Labor	Reg Pollard		57.8	+4.8
Liberal	Peter Kemp		42.2	−4.8
Labor hold		Swing	+4.8	

=== Mallee ===
This section is an excerpt from Electoral results for the Division of Mallee § 1961

1961 Australian federal election: Mallee
Party	Candidate	Votes	%	±%
Country	Winton Turnbull	24,086	62.5	−1.4
Labor	Murray Homes	10,144	26.3	+4.5
Democratic Labor	Michael Howley	4,338	11.2	−3.1
Total formal votes		38,568	98.0	
Informal votes		803	2.0	
Turnout		39,371	96.2	
Two-party-preferred result
Country	Winton Turnbull		72.6	−4.3
Labor	Murray Homes		27.4	+4.3
Country hold		Swing	−4.3	

=== Maribyrnong ===
This section is an excerpt from Electoral results for the Division of Maribyrnong § 1961

1961 Australian federal election: Maribyrnong
Party	Candidate	Votes	%	±%
Labor	Neil Armour	20,022	46.8	−0.5
Liberal	Philip Stokes	14,868	34.8	−2.1
Democratic Labor	Paul Gunn	7,438	17.4	+1.6
Centre	Norman McClure	413	1.0	+1.0
Total formal votes		42,741	97.5	
Informal votes		1,112	2.5	
Turnout		43,853	96.5	
Two-party-preferred result
Liberal	Philip Stokes	21,721	50.8	+0.0
Labor	Neil Armour	21,020	49.2	+0.0
Liberal hold		Swing	+0.0	

=== McMillan ===
This section is an excerpt from Electoral results for the Division of McMillan § 1961

1961 Australian federal election: McMillan
Party	Candidate	Votes	%	±%
Labor	James Longstaff	15,907	36.9	−2.4
Liberal	Alex Buchanan	15,288	35.5	+5.4
Country	Francis Hawtin	6,758	15.7	−3.0
Democratic Labor	Les Hilton	4,988	11.6	+1.4
Republican	Patrick Linane	181	0.4	+0.4
Total formal votes		43,122	97.6	
Informal votes		1,078	2.4	
Turnout		44,200	95.3	
Two-party-preferred result
Liberal	Alex Buchanan	26,401	61.2	+4.0
Labor	James Longstaff	16,721	38.8	−4.0
Liberal hold		Swing	+4.0	

=== Melbourne ===
This section is an excerpt from Electoral results for the Division of Melbourne § 1961

1961 Australian federal election: Melbourne
Party	Candidate	Votes	%	±%
Labor	Arthur Calwell	19,351	62.8	+3.2
Liberal	James Moloney	6,288	20.4	−2.4
Democratic Labor	Michael Kearney	5,166	16.8	−0.9
Total formal votes		30,805	96.2	
Informal votes		1,228	3.8	
Turnout		32,033	92.3	
Two-party-preferred result
Labor	Arthur Calwell		64.5	+3.1
Liberal	James Moloney		35.5	−3.1
Labor hold		Swing	+3.1	

=== Melbourne Ports ===
This section is an excerpt from Electoral results for the Division of Melbourne Ports § 1961

1961 Australian federal election: Melbourne Ports
Party	Candidate	Votes	%	±%
Labor	Frank Crean	20,590	61.7	−1.9
Liberal	Gordon Blackburne	7,483	22.4	+2.0
Democratic Labor	Albert Jones	4,572	13.7	−0.1
Communist	Roger Wilson	749	2.2	−0.1
Total formal votes		33,394	96.5	
Informal votes		1,201	3.5	
Turnout		34,595	93.7	
Two-party-preferred result
Labor	Frank Crean		65.1	−2.1
Liberal	Gordon Blackburne		34.9	+2.1
Labor hold		Swing	−2.1	

=== Murray ===
This section is an excerpt from Electoral results for the Division of Murray § 1961

1961 Australian federal election: Murray
Party	Candidate	Votes	%	±%
Country	John McEwen	26,773	61.5	−0.3
Labor	Neil Frankland	10,971	25.2	−0.2
Democratic Labor	Brian Lacey	5,784	13.3	+0.5
Total formal votes		43,528	97.8	
Informal votes		982	2.2	
Turnout		44,510	96.6	
Two-party-preferred result
Country	John McEwen		73.5	+0.2
Labor	Neil Frankland		26.5	−0.2
Country hold		Swing	+0.2	

=== Scullin ===
This section is an excerpt from Electoral results for the Division of Scullin (1955–69) § 1961

1961 Australian federal election: Scullin
Party	Candidate	Votes	%	±%
Labor	Ted Peters	18,506	60.9	+4.9
Democratic Labor	Barry O'Brien	7,273	23.9	−0.6
Liberal	Rex Schurmann	4,594	15.1	−4.4
Total formal votes		30,373	94.8	
Informal votes		1,664	5.2	
Turnout		32,037	92.6	
Two-party-preferred result
Labor	Ted Peters		62.4	+4.4
Democratic Labor	Barry O'Brien		37.6	−4.4
Labor hold		Swing	+4.4	

=== Wannon ===
This section is an excerpt from Electoral results for the Division of Wannon § 1961

1961 Australian federal election: Wannon
Party	Candidate	Votes	%	±%
Liberal	Malcolm Fraser	20,833	48.4	+0.2
Labor	Jack Stanford	15,162	35.2	−1.1
Democratic Labor	Terence Callander	7,069	16.4	+0.9
Total formal votes		43,064	98.9	
Informal votes		463	1.1	
Turnout		43,527	96.8	
Two-party-preferred result
Liberal	Malcolm Fraser	27,466	63.8	+1.5
Labor	Jack Stanford	15,598	36.2	−1.5
Liberal hold		Swing	+1.5	

=== Wills ===
This section is an excerpt from Electoral results for the Division of Wills § 1961

1961 Australian federal election: Wills
Party	Candidate	Votes	%	±%
Labor	Gordon Bryant	22,115	58.0	+4.3
Liberal	William Pyatt	8,454	22.2	−4.3
Democratic Labor	Bill Bryson	7,553	19.8	−0.1
Total formal votes		38,122	96.7	
Informal votes		1,300	3.3	
Turnout		39,422	95.3	
Two-party-preferred result
Labor	Gordon Bryant		60.0	+4.3
Liberal	William Pyatt		40.0	−4.3
Labor hold		Swing	+4.3	

=== Wimmera ===
This section is an excerpt from Electoral results for the Division of Wimmera § 1961

1961 Australian federal election: Wimmera
Party	Candidate	Votes	%	±%
Country	Robert King	13,364	34.4	+9.1
Labor	Thomas Windsor	11,567	29.8	+2.2
Liberal	William Lawrence	10,718	27.6	−10.6
Democratic Labor	Joseph Murphy	3,214	8.3	−0.6
Total formal votes		38,863	98.7	
Informal votes		515	1.3	
Turnout		39,378	96.9	
Two-party-preferred result
Country	Robert King	26,614	68.5	+12.6
Labor	Thomas Windsor	12,249	31.5	+31.5
Country hold		Swing	+12.6	

=== Yarra ===
This section is an excerpt from Electoral results for the Division of Yarra § 1961

1961 Australian federal election: Yarra
Party	Candidate	Votes	%	±%
Labor	Jim Cairns	17,137	52.1	−1.5
Liberal	Andrew Peacock	8,341	25.3	+1.6
Democratic Labor	Stan Keon	5,535	16.8	−4.4
Centre	Geoffrey Broomhall	1,345	4.1	+4.1
Communist	Ken Miller	564	1.7	+0.2
Total formal votes		32,922	95.3	
Informal votes		1,620	4.7	
Turnout		34,542	93.2	
Two-party-preferred result
Labor	Jim Cairns		57.9	+0.8
Liberal	Andrew Peacock		42.1	−0.8
Labor hold		Swing	+0.8	

== Queensland ==
1961 Australian federal election (Queensland)
← 1958	9 December 1961	1963 →

All 18 Queensland seats in the House of Representatives 9 seats needed for a majority
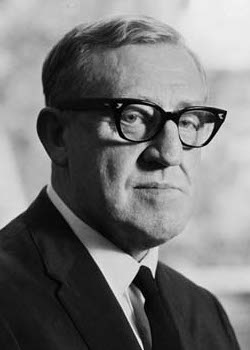

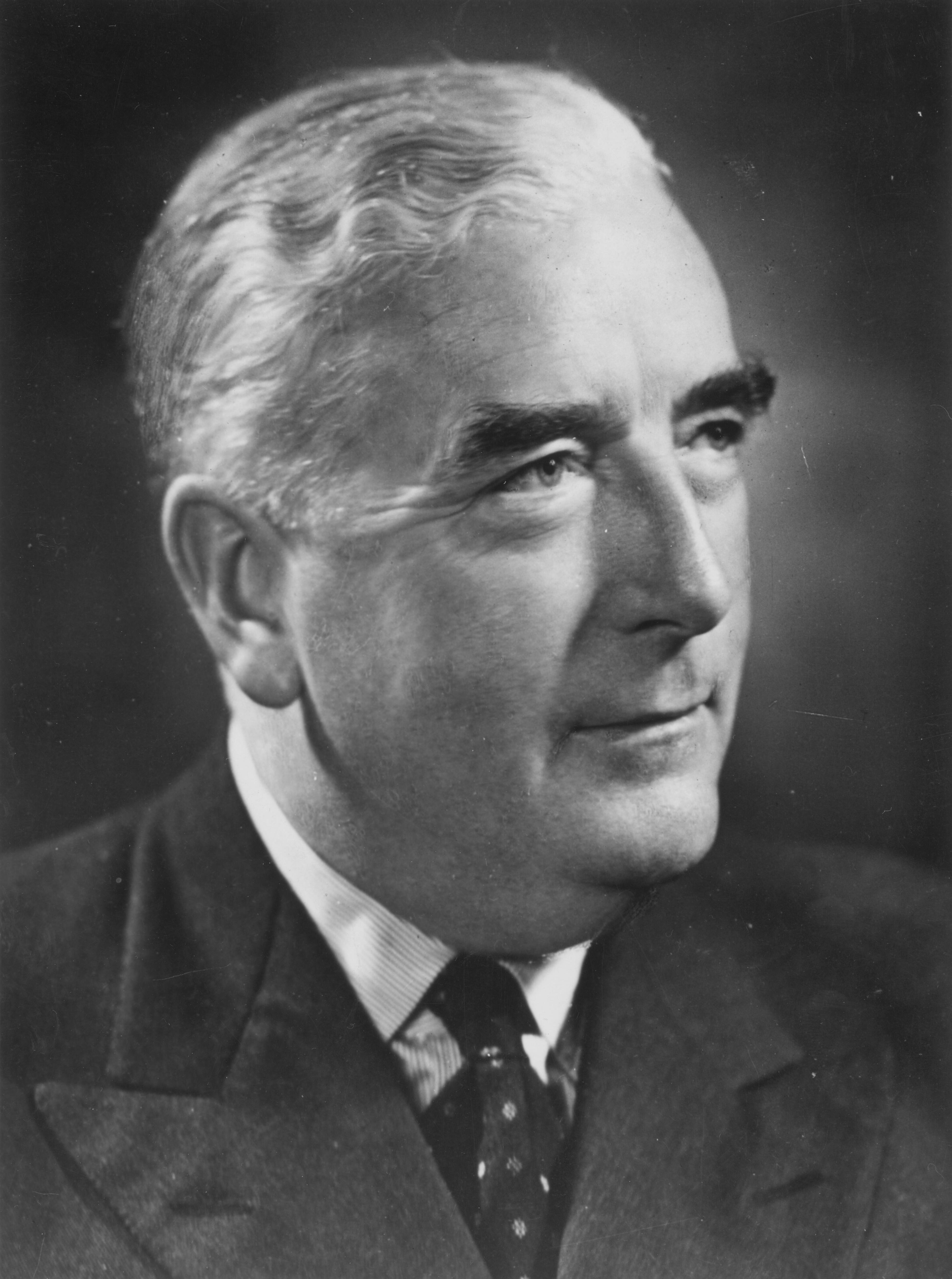
	First party	Second party
Leader	Arthur Calwell	Robert Menzies
Party	Labor	Coalition
Seats before	3	15
Seats won	11	7
Seat change	▲8	▼8
Popular vote	365,930	331,773
Percentage	48.1%	43.6%
Swing	▲10.6pp	▼6.9pp
TPP	50.7%	49.3%
TPP swing	▲9.3pp	▼9.3pp

=== Bowman ===
This section is an excerpt from Electoral results for the Division of Bowman § 1961

1961 Australian federal election: Bowman
Party	Candidate	Votes	%	±%
Labor	Jack Comber	21,393	47.1	+8.5
Liberal	Malcolm McColm	19,706	43.4	−5.5
Queensland Labor	Terence Burns	4,327	9.5	−2.3
Total formal votes		45,426	97.4	
Informal votes		1,202	2.6	
Turnout		46,628	95.5	
Two-party-preferred result
Labor	Jack Comber	23,594	51.9	+8.0
Liberal	Malcolm McColm	21,832	48.1	−8.0
Labor gain from Liberal		Swing	+8.0	

=== Brisbane ===
This section is an excerpt from Electoral results for the Division of Brisbane § 1961

1961 Australian federal election: Brisbane
Party	Candidate	Votes	%	±%
Labor	Manfred Cross	18,793	53.7	+6.4
Liberal	Kevin Cairns	11,384	32.5	−6.2
Queensland Labor	Walter Barnes	4,087	11.7	+0.4
Communist	Warren Bowden	713	2.0	+0.2
Total formal votes		34,977	95.6	
Informal votes		1,628	4.4	
Turnout		36,605	93.4	
Two-party-preferred result
Labor	Manfred Cross		57.6	+6.9
Liberal	Kevin Cairns		42.4	−6.9
Labor hold		Swing	+6.9	

=== Capricornia ===
This section is an excerpt from Electoral results for the Division of Capricornia § 1961

1961 Australian federal election: Capricornia
Party	Candidate	Votes	%	±%
Labor	George Gray	18,517	49.4	+8.8
Liberal	Henry Pearce	14,357	38.3	−10.7
Queensland Labor	Mick Gardner	4,606	12.3	+1.9
Total formal votes		37,480	97.7	
Informal votes		891	2.3	
Turnout		38,371	96.5	
Two-party-preferred result
Labor	George Gray	20,606	55.0	+10.7
Liberal	Henry Pearce	16,874	45.0	−10.7
Labor gain from Liberal		Swing	+10.7	

=== Darling Downs ===
This section is an excerpt from Electoral results for the Division of Darling Downs § 1961

1961 Australian federal election: Darling Downs
Party	Candidate	Votes	%	±%
Liberal	Reginald Swartz	20,971	51.0	−5.5
Labor	Jack McCafferty	17,153	41.7	+7.4
Queensland Labor	Margaret Walsh	3,025	7.4	−1.9
Total formal votes		41,149	98.1	
Informal votes		803	1.9	
Turnout		41,952	97.3	
Two-party-preferred result
Liberal	Reginald Swartz		56.9	−7.0
Labor	Jack McCafferty		43.1	+7.0
Liberal hold		Swing	−7.0	

=== Dawson ===
This section is an excerpt from Electoral results for the Division of Dawson § 1961

1961 Australian federal election: Dawson
Party	Candidate	Votes	%	±%
Country	Charles Davidson	19,068	52.7	−8.1
Labor	Cyril Mitchell	14,764	40.8	+11.7
Queensland Labor	Waller O'Grady	2,344	6.5	−3.6
Total formal votes		36,176	97.4	
Informal votes		957	2.6	
Turnout		37,133	95.4	
Two-party-preferred result
Country	Charles Davidson		57.9	−11.0
Labor	Cyril Mitchell		42.1	+11.0
Country hold		Swing	−11.0	

=== Fisher ===
This section is an excerpt from Electoral results for the Division of Fisher § 1961

1961 Australian federal election: Fisher
Party	Candidate	Votes	%	±%
Country	Charles Adermann	23,478	55.9	−10.2
Labor	William Weir	15,065	35.8	+10.4
Queensland Labor	John Newman	3,490	8.3	−0.2
Total formal votes		42,033	98.4	
Informal votes		698	1.6	
Turnout		42,731	96.4	
Two-party-preferred result
Country	Charles Adermann		62.5	−10.4
Labor	William Weir		37.5	+10.4
Country hold		Swing	−10.4	

=== Griffith ===
This section is an excerpt from Electoral results for the Division of Griffith § 1961

1961 Australian federal election: Griffith
Party	Candidate	Votes	%	±%
Labor	Wilfred Coutts	21,392	55.4	+9.1
Liberal	Arthur Chresby	13,549	35.1	−4.5
Queensland Labor	Donald McKenna	3,700	9.6	−4.5
Total formal votes		38,641	96.6	
Informal votes		1,353	3.4	
Turnout		39,994	94.2	
Two-party-preferred result
Labor	Wilfred Coutts		57.3	+7.4
Liberal	Arthur Chresby		42.7	−7.4
Labor gain from Liberal		Swing	+7.4	

=== Herbert ===
This section is an excerpt from Electoral results for the Division of Herbert § 1961

1961 Australian federal election: Herbert
Party	Candidate	Votes	%	±%
Labor	Ted Harding	20,839	49.0	+7.5
Liberal	John Murray	18,296	43.1	+0.5
Queensland Labor	Victor Bodero	2,181	5.1	−9.0
Communist	Frank Bishop	1,171	2.8	+1.0
Total formal votes		42,487	96.3	
Informal votes		1,634	3.7	
Turnout		44,121	94.3	
Two-party-preferred result
Labor	Ted Harding		52.3	+3.8
Liberal	John Murray		47.7	−3.8
Labor gain from Liberal		Swing	+3.8	

=== Kennedy ===
This section is an excerpt from Electoral results for the Division of Kennedy § 1961

1961 Australian federal election: Kennedy
Party	Candidate	Votes	%	±%
Labor	Bill Riordan	21,124	62.1	+11.2
Country	Thomas Halloran	10,723	31.5	−1.7
Queensland Labor	Harry Wright	2,163	6.4	−9.5
Total formal votes		34,010	97.2	
Informal votes		994	2.8	
Turnout		35,004	90.6	
Two-party-preferred result
Labor	Bill Riordan		63.4	+9.3
Country	Thomas Halloran		36.6	−9.3
Labor hold		Swing	+9.3	

=== Leichhardt ===
This section is an excerpt from Electoral results for the Division of Leichhardt § 1961

1961 Australian federal election: Leichhardt
Party	Candidate	Votes	%	±%
Labor	Bill Fulton	26,243	66.3	+19.1
Country	Reginald Wiles	10,839	27.4	−8.9
Queensland Labor	Arthur Trembath	2,485	6.3	−10.3
Total formal votes		39,567	97.2	
Informal votes		1,158	2.8	
Turnout		40,725	91.3	
Two-party-preferred result
Labor	Bill Fulton		67.6	+11.4
Country	Reginald Wiles		32.4	−11.4
Labor hold		Swing	+11.4	

=== Lilley ===
This section is an excerpt from Electoral results for the Division of Lilley § 1961

1961 Australian federal election: Lilley
Party	Candidate	Votes	%	±%
Labor	Don Cameron	20,186	46.6	+12.3
Liberal	Bruce Wight	18,755	43.3	−8.1
Queensland Labor	Frank Andrews	4,361	10.1	−3.5
Total formal votes		43,302	97.0	
Informal votes		1,329	3.0	
Turnout		44,631	94.3	
Two-party-preferred result
Labor	Don Cameron	22,208	51.3	+13.2
Liberal	Bruce Wight	21,094	48.7	−13.2
Labor gain from Liberal		Swing	+13.2	

=== Maranoa ===
This section is an excerpt from Electoral results for the Division of Maranoa § 1961

1961 Australian federal election: Maranoa
Party	Candidate	Votes	%	±%
Country	Wilfred Brimblecombe	17,554	47.5	−4.3
Labor	Trevor Alexander	16,390	44.3	+10.0
Queensland Labor	Bryan Hurley	3,013	8.2	−5.7
Total formal votes		36,957	98.5	
Informal votes		563	1.5	
Turnout		37,520	92.5	
Two-party-preferred result
Country	Wilfred Brimblecombe	19,823	53.6	−9.3
Labor	Trevor Alexander	17,134	46.4	+9.3
Country hold		Swing	−9.3	

=== McPherson ===
This section is an excerpt from Electoral results for the Division of McPherson § 1961

1961 Australian federal election: McPherson
Party	Candidate	Votes	%	±%
Country	Charles Barnes	28,076	53.8	−9.3
Labor	William Ware	19,293	37.0	+9.6
Queensland Labor	John O'Connell	3,406	6.5	−3.0
Independent	Allen Kirkegaard	797	1.5	+1.5
Independent	Thomas Masterson	624	1.2	+1.2
Total formal votes		52,196	96.9	
Informal votes		1,691	3.1	
Turnout		53,887	94.1	
Two-party-preferred result
Country	Charles Barnes		60.4	−10.3
Labor	William Ware		39.6	+10.3
Country hold		Swing	−10.3	

=== Moreton ===
This section is an excerpt from Electoral results for the Division of Moreton § 1961

1961 Australian federal election: Moreton
Party	Candidate	Votes	%	±%
Labor	John O'Donnell	25,123	48.0	+11.8
Liberal	James Killen	22,667	43.3	−7.6
Queensland Labor	Christian Hagen	3,882	7.4	−2.7
Communist	Max Julius	676	1.3	−1.5
Total formal votes		52,348	96.5	
Informal votes		1,921	3.5	
Turnout		54,269	95.2	
Two-party-preferred result
Liberal	James Killen	26,239	50.1	−10.2
Labor	John O'Donnell	26,109	49.9	+10.2
Liberal hold		Swing	−10.2	

=== Oxley ===
This section is an excerpt from Electoral results for the Division of Oxley § 1961

1961 Australian federal election: Oxley
Party	Candidate	Votes	%	±%
Labor	Bill Hayden	22,247	52.7	+10.8
Liberal	Donald Cameron	18,222	43.3	−12.4
Queensland Labor	Kenneth Rawle	1,720	4.1	+1.8
Total formal votes		42,239	98.1	
Informal votes		800	1.9	
Turnout		43,039	96.6	
Two-party-preferred result
Labor	Bill Hayden		53.5	+9.4
Liberal	Donald Cameron		46.5	−9.4
Labor gain from Liberal		Swing	+9.4	

=== Petrie ===
This section is an excerpt from Electoral results for the Division of Petrie § 1961

1961 Australian federal election: Petrie
Party	Candidate	Votes	%	±%
Labor	Reginald O'Brien	26,468	49.2	+14.3
Liberal	Alan Hulme	22,516	41.9	−8.6
Queensland Labor	Trevol Sturling	3,179	5.9	−4.9
Independent	Cecil Guilfoyle	1,314	2.4	+2.4
Independent	Francis O'Mara	266	0.5	+0.5
Total formal votes		53,743	97.1	
Informal votes		1,611	2.9	
Turnout		55,354	95.5	
Two-party-preferred result
Labor	Reginald O'Brien	27,269	50.7	+11.2
Liberal	Alan Hulme	26,474	49.3	−11.2
Labor gain from Liberal		Swing	+11.2	

=== Ryan ===
This section is an excerpt from Electoral results for the Division of Ryan § 1961

1961 Australian federal election: Ryan
Party	Candidate	Votes	%	±%
Liberal	Nigel Drury	24,984	52.2	−5.8
Labor	Joy Guyatt	19,132	40.0	+10.2
Queensland Labor	Michael Long	3,771	7.9	−2.5
Total formal votes		47,887	97.5	
Informal votes		1,244	2.5	
Turnout		49,131	95.3	
Two-party-preferred result
Liberal	Nigel Drury		58.5	−8.7
Labor	Joy Guyatt		41.5	+8.7
Liberal hold		Swing	−8.7	

=== Wide Bay ===
This section is an excerpt from Electoral results for the Division of Wide Bay § 1961

1961 Australian federal election: Wide Bay
Party	Candidate	Votes	%	±%
Labor	Brendan Hansen	21,808	53.4	+12.4
Country	Henry Bandidt	16,578	40.6	−7.1
Queensland Labor	Edward McDonnell	1,747	4.3	−7.0
Independent	James Dunn	730	1.8	+1.8
Total formal votes		40,863	98.3	
Informal votes		718	1.7	
Turnout		41,581	96.0	
Two-party-preferred result
Labor	Brendan Hansen		55.2	+9.5
Country	Henry Bandidt		44.8	−9.5
Labor gain from Country		Swing	+9.5	

== South Australia ==
1961 Australian federal election (South Australia)
← 1958	9 December 1961	1963 →

All 11 SA seats in the House of Representatives 6 seats needed for a majority
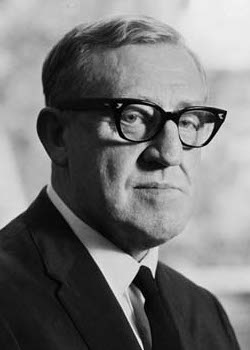

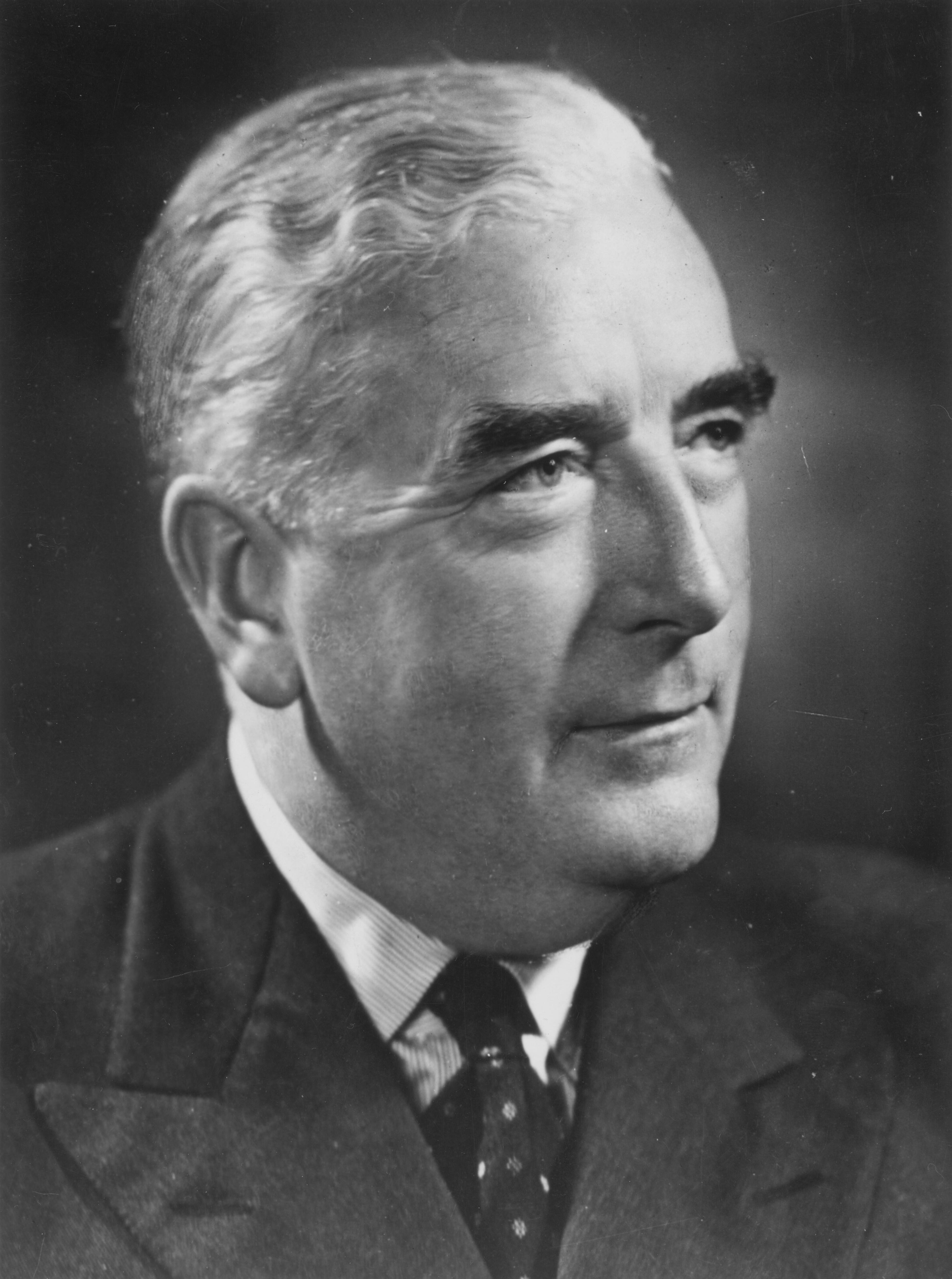
	First party	Second party
Leader	Arthur Calwell	Robert Menzies
Party	Labor	Coalition
Seats before	6	5
Seats won	6	5
Seat change	Steady	Steady
Popular vote	253,225	195,341
Percentage	52.1%	40.2%
Swing	▲4.6pp	▼4.7pp
TPP	54.2%	45.8%
TPP swing	▲4.4pp	▼4.4pp

=== Adelaide ===
This section is an excerpt from Electoral results for the Division of Adelaide § 1961

1961 Australian federal election: Adelaide
Party	Candidate	Votes	%	±%
Labor	Joe Sexton	18,804	55.8	+5.8
Liberal	John Rundle	11,648	34.5	−5.3
Democratic Labor	Ursula Cook	3,276	9.7	−0.5
Total formal votes		33,728	96.2	
Informal votes		1,317	3.8	
Turnout		35,045	95.0	
Two-party-preferred result
Labor	Joe Sexton		57.5	+4.7
Liberal	John Rundle		42.5	−4.7
Labor hold		Swing	+4.7	

=== Angas ===
This section is an excerpt from Electoral results for the Division of Angas (1949–1977) § 1949

1961 Australian federal election: Angas
Party	Candidate	Votes	%	±%
Liberal	Alick Downer	22,798	56.7	−4.7
Labor	Arnold Busbridge	14,587	36.3	+6.0
Democratic Labor	John Balogh	2,853	7.1	+0.5
Total formal votes		40,238	97.2	
Informal votes		1,165	2.8	
Turnout		41,403	97.0	
Two-party-preferred result
Liberal	Alick Downer		61.6	−6.1
Labor	Arnold Busbridge		38.4	+6.1
Liberal hold		Swing	−6.1	

=== Barker ===
This section is an excerpt from Electoral results for the Division of Barker § 1961

1961 Australian federal election: Barker
Party	Candidate	Votes	%	±%
Liberal	Jim Forbes	23,732	54.4	−5.9
Labor	Norman Alcock	17,428	40.0	+4.3
Democratic Labor	Charles Coffey	1,364	3.1	−0.9
Independent	John Gartner	1,089	2.5	+2.5
Total formal votes		43,613	97.6	
Informal votes		1,094	2.4	
Turnout		44,707	97.0	
Two-party-preferred result
Liberal	Jim Forbes		58.2	−5.3
Labor	Norman Alcock		41.8	+5.3
Liberal hold		Swing	−5.3	

=== Bonython ===
This section is an excerpt from Electoral results for the Division of Bonython § 1961

1961 Australian federal election: Bonython
Party	Candidate	Votes	%	±%
Labor	Norman Makin	35,245	63.2	+1.9
Liberal	Margaret McLachlan	13,562	24.3	−4.1
Democratic Labor	Edward Timlin	3,331	6.0	+1.1
Independent	Thomas Ellis	2,938	5.3	+5.3
Communist	Alan Miller	695	1.2	−4.3
Total formal votes		55,771	95.4	
Informal votes		2,659	4.6	
Turnout		58,430	95.9	
Two-party-preferred result
Labor	Norman Makin		67.7	+1.4
Liberal	Margaret McLachlan		32.3	−1.4
Labor hold		Swing	+1.4	

=== Boothby ===
This section is an excerpt from Electoral results for the Division of Boothby § 1961

1961 Australian federal election: Boothby
Party	Candidate	Votes	%	±%
Liberal	John McLeay	20,976	51.4	−4.2
Labor	Ronald Basten	17,206	42.1	+5.0
Democratic Labor	Ted Farrell	2,660	6.5	−0.7
Total formal votes		40,842	97.1	
Informal votes		1,208	2.9	
Turnout		42,050	95.3	
Two-party-preferred result
Liberal	John McLeay		56.6	−4.8
Labor	Ronald Basten		43.4	+4.8
Liberal hold		Swing	−4.8	

=== Grey ===
This section is an excerpt from Electoral results for the Division of Grey § 1961

1961 Australian federal election: Grey
Party	Candidate	Votes	%	±%
Labor	Edgar Russell	24,642	58.2	+4.7
Liberal	Arthur Dodgson	16,155	38.2	−2.6
Democratic Labor	Richard Mills	1,512	3.6	−0.8
Total formal votes		42,309	97.4	
Informal votes		1,127	2.6	
Turnout		43,436	96.0	
Two-party-preferred result
Labor	Edgar Russell		58.8	+3.8
Liberal	Arthur Dodgson		41.2	−3.8
Labor hold		Swing	+3.8	

=== Hindmarsh ===
This section is an excerpt from Electoral results for the Division of Hindmarsh § 1961

1961 Australian federal election: Hindmarsh
Party	Candidate	Votes	%	±%
Labor	Clyde Cameron	31,194	67.9	+5.5
Liberal	Karl-Juergen Liebetrau	12,619	27.5	−3.7
Democratic Labor	Cyril Holasek	2,097	4.6	−1.8
Total formal votes		45,910	96.7	
Informal votes		1,563	3.3	
Turnout		47,473	96.0	
Two-party-preferred result
Labor	Clyde Cameron		68.8	+5.1
Liberal	Karl-Juergen Liebetrau		31.2	−5.1
Labor hold		Swing	+5.1	

=== Kingston ===
This section is an excerpt from Electoral results for the Division of Kingston § 1961

1961 Australian federal election: Kingston
Party	Candidate	Votes	%	±%
Labor	Pat Galvin	32,279	56.2	+5.4
Liberal	John McCoy	20,144	35.1	−7.5
Democratic Labor	Brian Crowe	5,026	8.7	+2.1
Total formal votes		57,449	97.8	
Informal votes		1,316	2.2	
Turnout		58,765	96.4	
Two-party-preferred result
Labor	Pat Galvin		58.7	+6.6
Liberal	John McCoy		41.3	−6.6
Labor hold		Swing	+6.6	

=== Port Adelaide ===
This section is an excerpt from Electoral results for the Division of Port Adelaide § 1961

1961 Australian federal election: Port Adelaide
Party	Candidate	Votes	%	±%
Labor	Albert Thompson	30,046	71.8	+3.1
Liberal	Kimball Kelly	7,556	18.1	−5.6
Democratic Labor	George Basisovs	3,290	7.9	+2.2
Communist	Peter Symon	938	2.2	+0.3
Total formal votes		41,830	95.6	
Informal votes		1,929	4.4	
Turnout		43,759	96.2	
Two-party-preferred result
Labor	Albert Thompson		75.2	+3.7
Liberal	Kimball Kelly		24.8	−3.7
Labor hold		Swing	+3.7	

=== Sturt ===
This section is an excerpt from Electoral results for the Division of Sturt § 1961

1961 Australian federal election: Sturt
Party	Candidate	Votes	%	±%
Liberal	Keith Wilson	23,392	52.2	−4.9
Labor	Arthur Penn	17,430	38.9	+1.3
Democratic Labor	Walter Doran	4,000	8.9	+3.6
Total formal votes		44,822	97.0	
Informal votes		1,367	3.0	
Turnout		46,189	95.7	
Two-party-preferred result
Liberal	Keith Wilson		58.5	−2.8
Labor	Arthur Penn		41.5	+2.8
Liberal hold		Swing	−2.8	

=== Wakefield ===
This section is an excerpt from Electoral results for the Division of Wakefield § 1961

1961 Australian federal election: Wakefield
Party	Candidate	Votes	%	±%
Liberal	Bert Kelly	22,759	58.1	+1.3
Labor	Collin Wood	14,364	36.7	+5.8
Democratic Labor	John McMahon	2,048	5.2	−0.5
Total formal votes		39,171	97.8	
Informal votes		884	2.2	
Turnout		40,055	96.9	
Two-party-preferred result
Liberal	Bert Kelly		62.3	−2.8
Labor	Collin Wood		37.7	+2.8
Liberal hold		Swing	−2.8	

== Western Australia ==
1961 Australian federal election (Western Australia)
← 1958	9 December 1961	1963 →

All 9 WA seats in the House of Representatives 5 seats needed for a majority
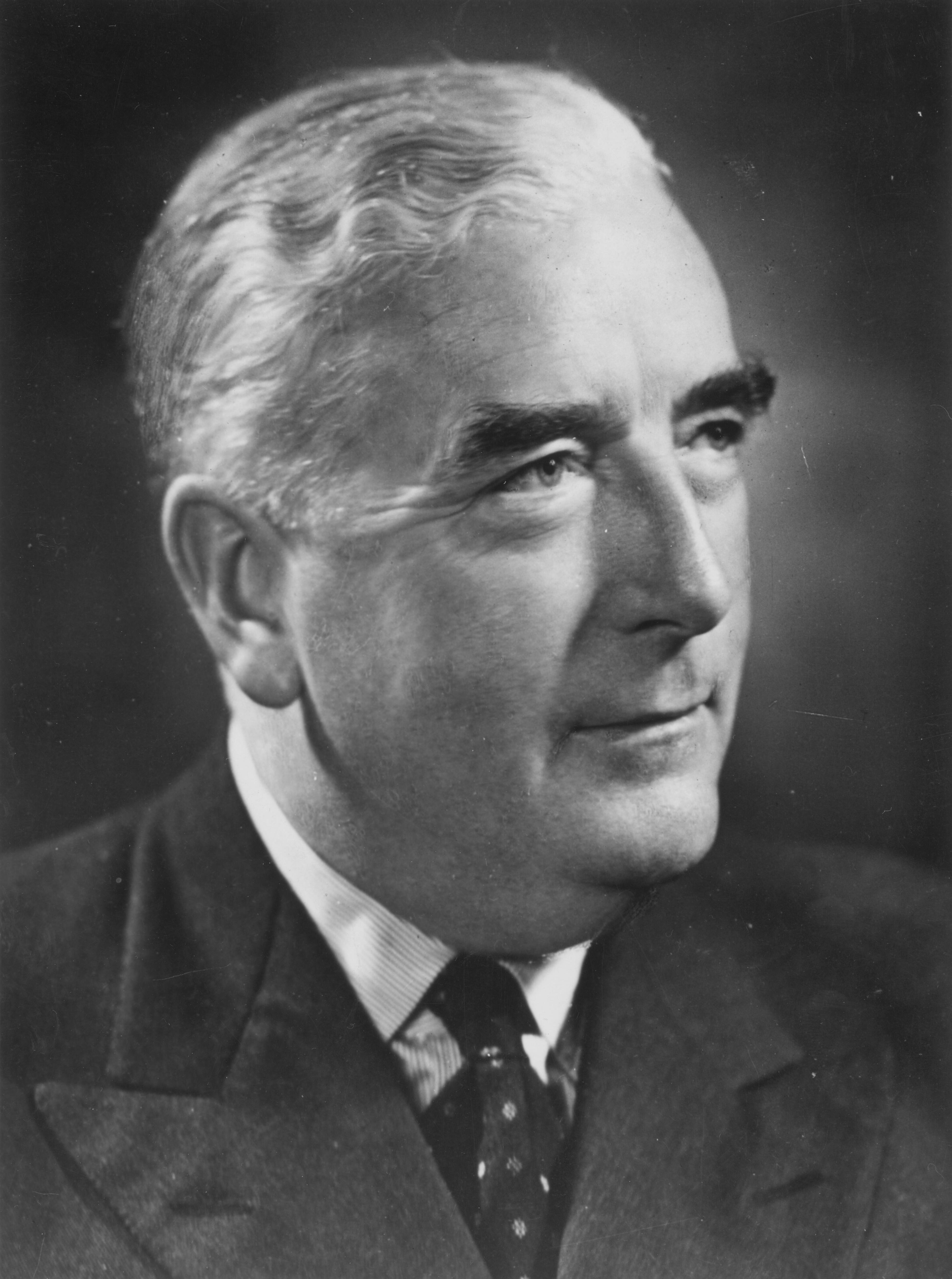

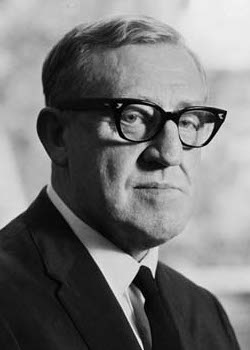
	First party	Second party
Leader	Robert Menzies	Arthur Calwell
Party	Coalition	Labor
Seats before	8	1
Seats won	6	3
Seat change	▼2	▲2
Popular vote	182,740	144,188
Percentage	51.8%	40.9%
Swing	▼1.4pp	▲5.9pp
TPP	56.2%	43.5%
TPP swing	▼2.7pp	▲2.7pp

=== Canning ===
This section is an excerpt from Electoral results for the Division of Canning § 1961

1961 Australian federal election: Canning
Party	Candidate	Votes	%	±%
Liberal	Neil McNeill	13,931	38.2	+38.2
Labor	Charles Edwards	10,659	29.2	+29.2
Country	John Hallett	10,168	27.9	−44.4
Democratic Labor	Stanley Meredith	1,706	4.7	−22.9
Total formal votes		36,464	96.0	
Informal votes		1,525	4.0	
Turnout		37,989	95.5	
Two-party-preferred result
Liberal	Neil McNeill	23,943	65.7	+65.7
Labor	Charles Edwards	12,521	34.3	+34.3
Liberal gain from Country		Swing	+65.7	

=== Curtin ===
This section is an excerpt from Electoral results for the Division of Curtin § 1961

1961 Australian federal election: Curtin
Party	Candidate	Votes	%	±%
Liberal	Paul Hasluck	24,811	63.2	−0.5
Labor	George Piesley	9,698	24.7	+2.5
Democratic Labor	Wilfred Bodeker	4,768	12.1	−2.0
Total formal votes		39,277	97.6	
Informal votes		969	2.4	
Turnout		40,246	94.7	
Two-party-preferred result
Liberal	Paul Hasluck		73.1	−2.1
Labor	George Piesley		26.9	+2.1
Liberal hold		Swing	−2.1	

=== Forrest ===
This section is an excerpt from Electoral results for the Division of Forrest § 1961

1961 Australian federal election: Forrest
Party	Candidate	Votes	%	±%
Liberal	Gordon Freeth	22,275	57.5	+5.9
Labor	Ernest Stapleton	16,462	42.5	+3.7
Total formal votes		38,737	97.1	
Informal votes		1,148	2.9	
Turnout		39,885	96.0	
Liberal hold		Swing	−2.0	

=== Fremantle ===
This section is an excerpt from Electoral results for the Division of Fremantle § 1961

1961 Australian federal election: Fremantle
Party	Candidate	Votes	%	±%
Labor	Kim Beazley Sr.	27,615	60.7	+3.5
Liberal	John Waghorne	16,747	36.8	−3.4
Communist	Joan Williams	1,107	2.4	−0.1
Total formal votes		45,469	97.3	
Informal votes		1,268	2.7	
Turnout		46,737	95.5	
Two-party-preferred result
Labor	Kim Beazley Sr.		62.9	+3.4
Liberal	John Waghorne		37.1	−3.4
Labor hold		Swing	+3.4	

=== Kalgoorlie ===
This section is an excerpt from Electoral results for the Division of Kalgoorlie § 1961

1961 Australian federal election: Kalgoorlie
Party	Candidate	Votes	%	±%
Labor	Fred Collard	14,231	47.9	+3.6
Liberal	Peter Browne	12,850	43.3	+6.7
Democratic Labor	George Jensen	1,578	5.3	−6.6
Independent	Harold Illingworth	1,050	3.5	−3.8
Total formal votes		29,709	97.2	
Informal votes		859	2.8	
Turnout		30,568	91.2	
Two-party-preferred result
Labor	Fred Collard	15,034	50.6	+0.9
Liberal	Peter Browne	14,675	49.4	−0.9
Labor gain from Liberal		Swing	+0.9	

=== Moore ===
This section is an excerpt from Electoral results for the Division of Moore § 1961

1961 Australian federal election: Moore
Party	Candidate	Votes	%	±%
Liberal	Vic Halbert	12,406	35.0	+2.7
Country	Hugh Leslie	10,910	30.8	−9.7
Labor	Wilbur Bennett	10,106	28.5	+1.3
Democratic Labor	John Crisafulli	1,986	5.6	+5.6
Total formal votes		35,408	96.6	
Informal votes		1,237	3.4	
Turnout		36,645	94.5	
Two-party-preferred result
Country	Hugh Leslie	18,172	51.3	+4.2
Liberal	Vic Halbert	17,236	48.7	−4.2
Country gain from Liberal		Swing	+4.2	

=== Perth ===
This section is an excerpt from Electoral results for the Division of Perth § 1961

1961 Australian federal election: Perth
Party	Candidate	Votes	%	±%
Liberal	Fred Chaney Sr.	16,054	55.0	−1.0
Labor	Laurie Wilkinson	10,443	35.8	+4.2
Democratic Labor	Julius Re	2,679	9.2	−1.1
Total formal votes		29,176	95.3	
Informal votes		1,436	4.7	
Turnout		30,612	92.7	
Two-party-preferred result
Liberal	Fred Chaney Sr.		62.4	−2.8
Labor	Laurie Wilkinson		37.6	+2.8
Liberal hold		Swing	−2.8	

=== Stirling ===
This section is an excerpt from Electoral results for the Division of Stirling § 1961

1961 Australian federal election: Stirling
Party	Candidate	Votes	%	±%
Labor	Harry Webb	25,262	48.2	+0.8
Liberal	Doug Cash	19,818	37.8	−2.7
Democratic Labor	Adrian Briffa	6,704	12.8	+2.2
Communist	Jack Marks	649	1.2	+1.2
Total formal votes		52,433	96.5	
Informal votes		1,875	3.5	
Turnout		54,308	95.9	
Two-party-preferred result
Labor	Harry Webb	26,360	50.3	+0.5
Liberal	Doug Cash	26,073	49.7	−0.5
Labor gain from Liberal		Swing	+0.5	

=== Swan ===
This section is an excerpt from Electoral results for the Division of Swan § 1961

1961 Australian federal election: Swan
Party	Candidate	Votes	%	±%
Liberal	Richard Cleaver	22,770	49.3	+0.3
Labor	Ted Johnson	19,712	42.7	+3.6
Democratic Labor	Terence Merchant	3,732	8.1	−3.9
Total formal votes		46,214	97.1	
Informal votes		1,403	2.9	
Turnout		47,617	94.9	
Two-party-preferred result
Liberal	Richard Cleaver	25,671	55.5	+1.9
Labor	Ted Johnson	20,543	44.5	−1.9
Liberal hold		Swing	−1.9	

== Tasmania ==
1961 Australian federal election (Tasmania)
← 1958	9 December 1961	1963 →

All 5 Tasmanian seats in the House of Representatives 3 seats needed for a majority
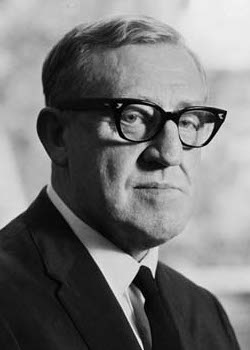

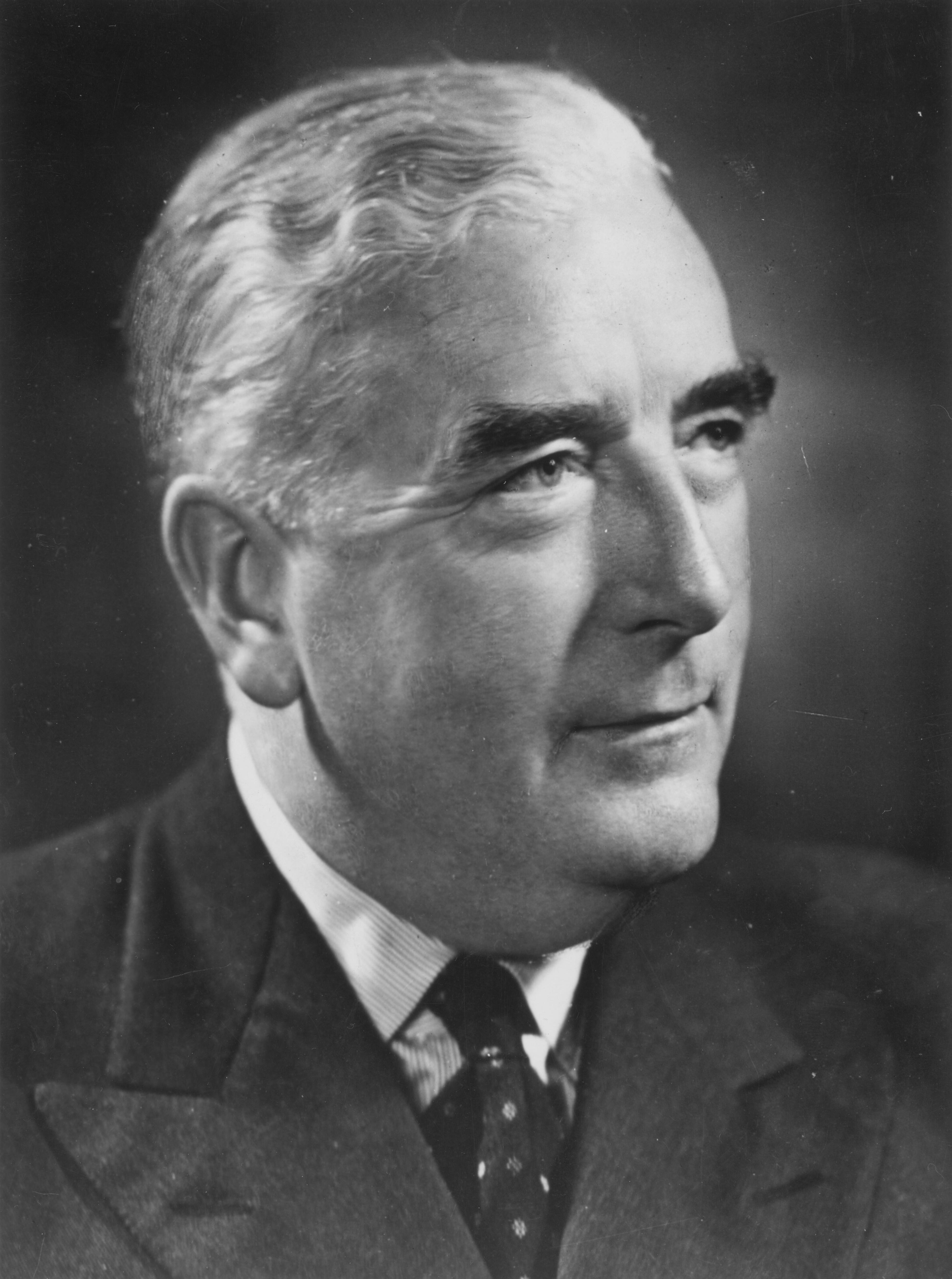
	First party	Second party
Leader	Arthur Calwell	Robert Menzies
Party	Labor	Coalition
Seats before	3	2
Seats won	3	2
Seat change	Steady	Steady
Popular vote	92,655	66,354
Percentage	53.9%	36.8%
Swing	▲7.1pp	▼5.9pp
TPP	56.0%	44.0%
TPP swing	▲6.2pp	▼6.2pp

=== Bass ===
This section is an excerpt from Electoral results for the Division of Bass § 1961

1961 Australian federal election: Bass
Party	Candidate	Votes	%	±%
Labor	Lance Barnard	21,601	62.7	+7.1
Liberal	Fred Marriott	11,326	32.9	−3.8
Democratic Labor	Francis Boland	1,532	4.4	−3.3
Total formal votes		34,459	96.9	
Informal votes		1,116	3.1	
Turnout		35,575	95.6	
Two-party-preferred result
Labor	Lance Barnard		63.6	+5.7
Liberal	Fred Marriott		36.4	−5.7
Labor hold		Swing	+5.7	

=== Braddon ===
This section is an excerpt from Electoral results for the Division of Braddon § 1961

1961 Australian federal election: Braddon
Party	Candidate	Votes	%	±%
Labor	Ron Davies	21,093	60.9	+14.1
Liberal	William Young	11,433	33.0	−11.6
Democratic Labor	Frances Lane	2,094	6.0	−2.6
Total formal votes		34,620	97.4	
Informal votes		911	2.6	
Turnout		35,531	96.5	
Two-party-preferred result
Labor	Ron Davies		62.1	+11.7
Liberal	William Young		37.9	−11.7
Labor hold		Swing	+11.7	

=== Denison ===
This section is an excerpt from Electoral results for the Division of Denison § 1961

1961 Australian federal election: Denison
Party	Candidate	Votes	%	±%
Liberal	Athol Townley	17,260	51.5	−1.1
Labor	Eric Howroyd	13,749	41.0	+5.6
Democratic Labor	Harold Senior	2,491	7.4	−0.8
Total formal votes		33,500	96.6	
Informal votes		1,197	3.4	
Turnout		34,697	94.8	
Two-party-preferred result
Liberal	Athol Townley		57.4	−2.0
Labor	Eric Howroyd		42.6	+2.0
Liberal hold		Swing	−2.0	

=== Franklin ===
This section is an excerpt from Electoral results for the Division of Franklin § 1961

1961 Australian federal election: Franklin
Party	Candidate	Votes	%	±%
Liberal	Bill Falkinder	16,784	45.9	−8.2
Labor	William Wilkinson	15,709	43.0	+6.3
Democratic Labor	St Clair Courtney	4,047	11.1	+1.9
Total formal votes		36,540	96.2	
Informal votes		1,427	3.8	
Turnout		37,967	96.2	
Two-party-preferred result
Liberal	Bill Falkinder	19,991	54.7	−6.8
Labor	William Wilkinson	16,549	45.3	+6.8
Liberal hold		Swing	−6.8	

=== Wilmot ===
This section is an excerpt from Electoral results for the Division of Wilmot § 1961

1961 Australian federal election: Wilmot
Party	Candidate	Votes	%	±%
Labor	Gil Duthie	20,503	62.6	+3.0
Liberal	Richard Thomas	6,271	19.1	−5.7
Liberal	Royston Ringrose	3,280	10.0	+10.0
Democratic Labor	Alastair Davidson	2,718	8.3	+2.6
Total formal votes		32,772	97.0	
Informal votes		1,028	3.0	
Turnout		33,800	95.5	
Two-party-preferred result
Labor	Gil Duthie		66.1	+5.4
Liberal	Richard Thomas		33.9	−5.4
Labor hold		Swing	+5.4	

== Territories ==
=== Australian Capital Territory ===
1961 Australian federal election (Australian Capital Territory)
← 1958	9 December 1961	1963 →

Division of Australian Capital Territory
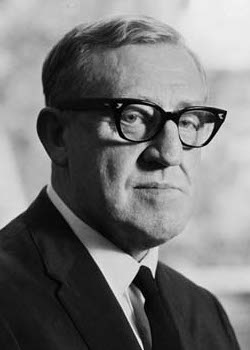

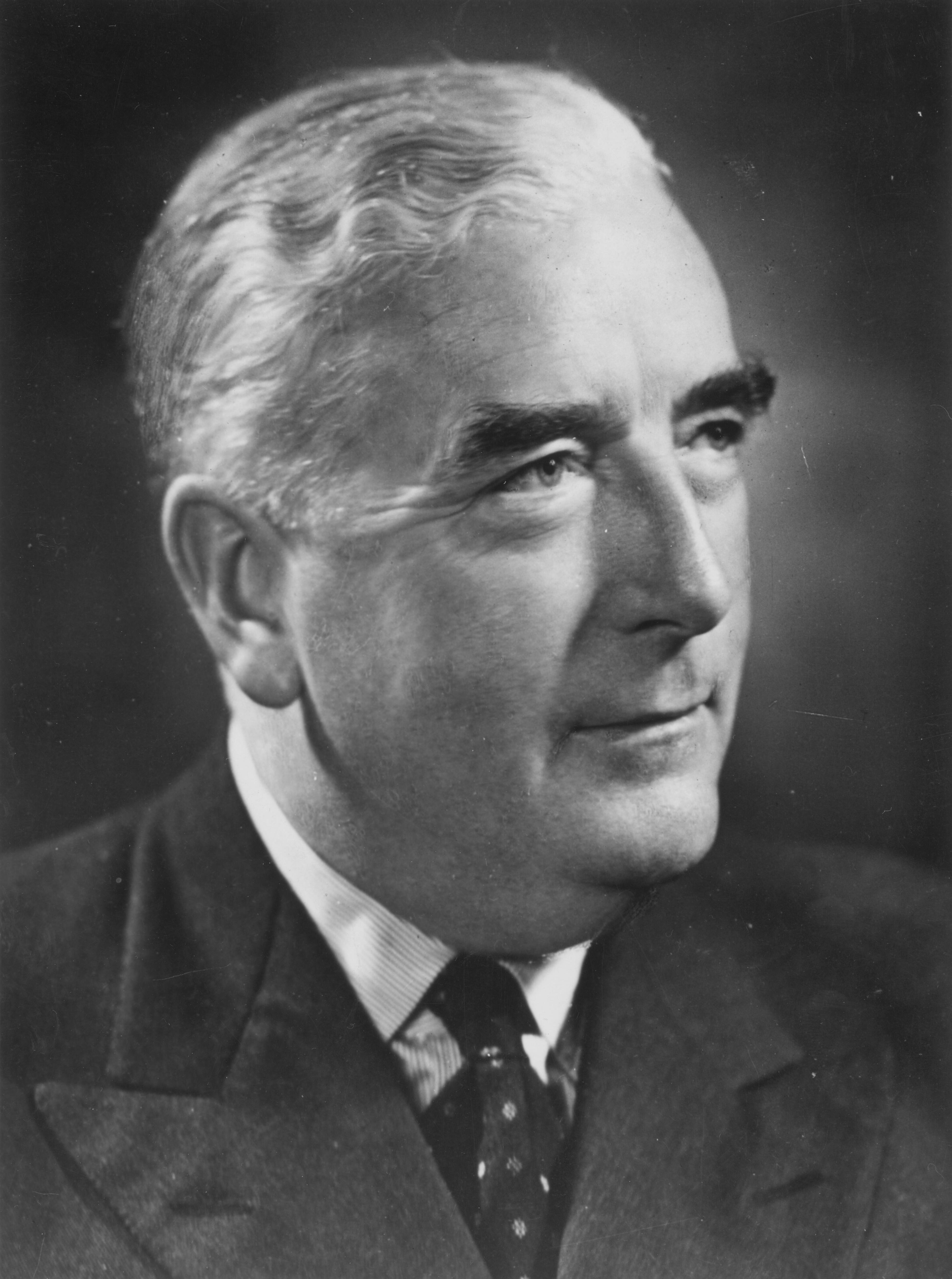
	First party	Second party
Leader	Arthur Calwell	Robert Menzies
Party	Labor	Coalition
Seats before	1	0
Seats won	1	0
Seat change	Steady	Steady
Popular vote	17,114	9,263
Percentage	64.9%	35.1%
Swing	▲1.5pp	▲11.9pp

This section is an excerpt from Electoral results for the Division of Australian Capital Territory § 1961

1961 Australian federal election: Australian Capital Territory
Party	Candidate	Votes	%	±%
Labor	Jim Fraser	17,114	64.9	+1.5
Liberal	Geoffrey Small	9,263	35.1	+11.9
Total formal votes		26,377	98.7	
Informal votes		351	1.3	
Turnout		26,728	93.2	
Labor hold		Swing	−1.9	

=== Northern Territory ===
This section is an excerpt from Electoral results for the Division of Northern Territory § 1961

1961 Australian federal election: Northern Territory
Party	Candidate	Votes	%	±%
Labor	Jock Nelson	4,659	51.0	−22.9
Independent	Harold Brennan	4,468	49.0	+49.0
Total formal votes		9,127	96.4	
Informal votes		343	3.6	
Turnout		9,470	78.1	
Labor hold		Swing	−22.9	

== See also ==
- Candidates of the 1961 Australian federal election
- Members of the Australian House of Representatives, 1961–1963
