= 1961 Australian federal election =

- 9 December 1961

All 124 (Note: The Northern Territory and Australian Capital Territory each had one seat, but members for the territories did not have full voting rights until 1966 and did not count toward government formation.) seats of the House of Representatives 62 seats were needed for a majority in the House 31 (of the 60) seats of the Senate
- Registered: 5,651,561 ▲4.96%
- Turnout: 5,384,350 (95.27%) (▼0.21 pp)
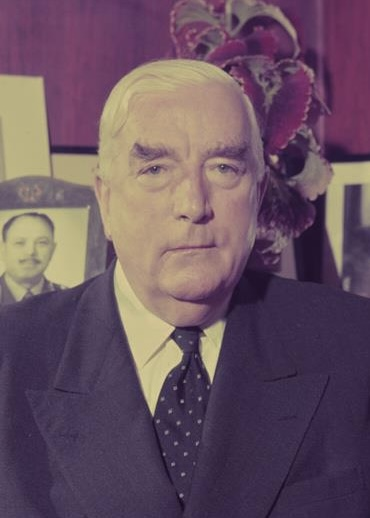

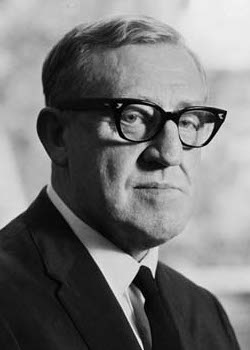
	First party	Second party
Leader	Robert Menzies	Arthur Calwell
Party	Liberal–Country Coalition	Labor
Leader since	23 September 1943	7 March 1960
Leader's seat	Kooyong (Vic.)	Melbourne (Vic.)
Last election	77 seats	45 seats
Seats won	62	60 + NT + ACT
Seat change	▼15	▲15
Primary vote	2,208,213	2,512,929
Percentage	42.09%	47.90%
Swing	▼4.46	▲5.09
TPP	49.50%	50.50%
TPP swing	▼4.60	▲4.60
- Results by division for the House of Representatives, shaded by winning party's margin of victory.
Prime Minister before election
Robert Menzies
Liberal/Country coalition
Subsequent Prime Minister
Robert Menzies
Liberal/Country coalition

A federal election was held in Australia on 9 December 1961. All 122 seats in the House of Representatives and 31 of the 60 seats in the Senate were up for election. The incumbent Liberal–Country coalition led by Prime Minister Robert Menzies defeated the opposition Labor Party under Arthur Calwell, despite losing the two-party-preferred popular vote.

In his first election as Labor leader, Calwell significantly reduced the Coalition's margin, gaining 15 seats to leave the government with only a two-seat majority. This was the first and only time that a Federal Government won a sixth consecutive term in office.

Future opposition leader and Governor General Bill Hayden entered parliament at this election.

== Issues ==
Due to a credit squeeze, the economy had gone into a brief recession in 1961 and unemployment had risen to high levels. This saw an increase in popularity for Labor; Menzies' case was not helped by an approach seen by the press, notably The Sydney Morning Herald, as inappropriately paternalistic. The Herald, which had long supported Menzies, switched sides to support Calwell and Labor, which gave Calwell the confidence to mount a spirited campaign. These factors were enough to see a swing against the Menzies Government.

== Results ==
=== House of Representatives ===
House of Reps (IRV) — 1961–63—Turnout 95.27% (CV) — Informal 2.57%
Party	First preference votes	%	Swing	Seats	Change
Labor	2,512,929	47.90	+5.09	62 (Note: Including Northern Territory and Australian Capital Territory)	+15
Liberal–Country coalition	2,208,213	42.09	–4.46	62	–15
Liberal	1,761,738	33.58	–3.65	45	–13
Country	446,475	8.51	–0.81	17	–2
Democratic Labor	399,475	7.61	–0.19	0	0
Queensland Labor	57,487	1.10	–0.50	0	0
Communist	25,429	0.48	–0.05	0	0
Commonwealth Centre	6,743	0.13	+0.13	0	0
Independents	35,757	0.68	+0.05	0	0
Total	5,246,033			122	
Two-party-preferred (estimated)
Liberal–Country coalition	Win	49.50	–4.60	62	–15
Labor		50.50	+4.60	60	+15

First preference vote
Labor	47.90%
Liberal	33.58%
DLP/QLP	8.71%
Country	8.51%
Other	1.29%

Two-party-preferred vote
Labor	50.50%
Coalition	49.50%

Parliament seats
Coalition	50.82%
Labor	49.18%

=== Senate ===
Senate (STV) — 1961–64—Turnout 95.27% (CV) — Informal 10.62%
Party	First preference votes	%	Swing	Seats won	Seats held	Change
Labor	2,151,339	44.71	+1.93	14	28	+2
Liberal–Country coalition	2,025,078	42.08	–3.12	16	30	–2
Liberal–Country joint ticket	1,595,696	33.16	+9.79	8	*	*
Liberal (separate ticket)	398,292	8.28	–12.41	7	24	–1
Country (separate ticket)	31,090	0.65	–0.50	1	6	–1
Democratic Labor	388,466	8.07	+2.25	0	1	–1
Queensland Labor	84,112	1.75	+0.09	0	0	0
Communist	78,188	1.62	–1.29	0	0	0
Social Credit	17,963	0.37	+0.37	0	0	0
Republican	10,589	0.22	+0.14	0	0	0
Other	10,029	0.21	+0.21	0	0	0
Independent	46,499	0.97	+0.54	1	1	+1
Total	4,812,263			31	60	

Notes

- In New South Wales, Queensland, and Victoria, the coalition parties ran a joint ticket. Of the eight senators elected on a joint ticket, five were members of the Liberal Party and three were members of the Country Party. In Western Australia, the coalition parties ran on separate tickets. In South Australia and Tasmania, only the Liberal Party ran a ticket.
- The sole independent elected was Reg Turnbull of Tasmania.
- "Other" includes 7,430 votes for "Pensioners" and 2,599 votes for the Commonwealth Centre Party.

== Seats changing hands ==
Seat	Pre-1961			Swing	Post-1961		
Seat	Party	Member	Margin	Swing	Margin	Member	Party
Bowman, Qld	Liberal	Malcolm McColm	6.1	8.0	1.9	Jack Comber	Labor
Canning, WA	Country	Len Hamilton	N/A	65.7	15.7	Neil McNeill	Liberal
Capricornia, Qld	Liberal	Henry Pearce	7.7	10.7	5.0	George Gray	Labor
Cowper, NSW	Country	Earle Page	11.1	12.9	1.8	Frank McGuren	Labor
Evans, NSW	Liberal	Frederick Osborne	7.0	7.1	0.1	James Monaghan	Labor
Griffith, Qld	Liberal	Arthur Chresby	0.1	7.4	7.3	Wilfred Coutts	Labor
Herbert, Qld	Liberal	John Murray	1.5	3.8	2.3	Ted Harding	Labor
Hume, NSW	Country	Charles Anderson	2.1	3.0	0.9	Arthur Fuller	Labor
Kalgoorlie, WA	Liberal	Peter Browne	0.3	0.9	0.6	Fred Collard	Labor
Lilley, Qld	Liberal	Bruce Wight	11.9	13.2	1.3	Don Cameron	Labor
Mitchell, NSW	Liberal	Roy Wheeler	8.0	11.4	3.4	John Armitage	Labor
Moore, WA	Liberal	Hugh Halbert	2.9	4.2	1.3	Hugh Leslie	Country
Oxley, Qld	Liberal	Donald Cameron	5.9	9.4	3.5	Bill Hayden	Labor
Petrie, Qld	Liberal	Alan Hulme	10.5	11.2	0.7	Reginald O'Brien	Labor
Phillip, NSW	Liberal	William Aston	1.9	3.3	1.4	Syd Einfeld	Labor
Stirling, WA	Liberal	Doug Cash	0.2	0.5	0.3	Harry Webb	Labor
Wide Bay, Qld	Country	Henry Bandidt	4.3	9.5	5.2	Brendan Hansen	Labor

- Members listed in italics did not contest their seat at this election.

== Significance ==
For a long time, the 1961 election remained the closest Federal election in Australian history, with the Coalition being reduced to the barest majority. Despite not having a majority of seats in New South Wales and Queensland the Coalition retained all of their seats in Victoria and could retain power. The election was decided in the seats of Bruce near Melbourne and Moreton near Brisbane where the Liberal Party won the seat by 130 votes due to Communist Party preferences.

In Bruce, Labor's Keith Ewert led Liberal Billy Snedden on the first count, but on the second count more than two-thirds of the DLP's preferences flowed to Snedden, enough to give him the victory.

However, the Coalition was not ensured of a sixth term in government until Jim Killen won Moreton by only 130 votes. Labor actually won 62 seats, the same as the Coalition. However, without Bruce, the best Labor could hope for was a hung parliament, since two of its seats were in ACT and Northern Territory. At the time, territorial MPs had limited voting rights and were not counted for the purpose of determining who was to form government. The record for the closest election in Australia's history was eventually beaten by the 2010 election, which was a 72-72 seat draw.

The most notable casualty was Earle Page, the third-longest serving MP in Australia's history, and briefly Prime Minister. He had been the member for Cowper since 1919. Although he was 81 years old and gravely ill with lung cancer, he decided to fight his 17th general election. His Labor opponent, Frank McGuren, needed a seemingly daunting 11-point swing to win the seat, but won by a slim three-point margin on the second count. Page, who had been too sick to actively campaign, died 11 days after the election without ever knowing he had been defeated. It is the only time that Labor has won Cowper.

== See also ==
- Candidates of the Australian federal election, 1961
- Members of the Australian House of Representatives, 1961–1963
- Members of the Australian Senate, 1962–1965
