= Candidates of the 1961 Australian federal election =

This article provides information on candidates who stood for the 1961 Australian federal election. The election was held on 9 December 1961.

== By-elections, appointments and defections ==
=== By-elections and appointments ===
- On 9 April 1960, John Jess (Liberal) was elected to replace Richard Casey (Liberal) as the member for La Trobe.
- On 9 April 1960, Bert James (Labor) was elected to replace H. V. Evatt (Labor) as the member for Hunter.
- On 16 July 1960, Noel Beaton (Labor) was elected to replace Percy Clarey (Labor) as the member for Bendigo.
- On 16 July 1960, Ray Whittorn (Liberal) was elected to replace Percy Joske (Liberal) as the member for Balaclava.
- On 5 November 1960, John England (Country) was elected to replace John Howse (Liberal) as the member for Calare.
- On 10 December 1960, Don Chipp (Liberal) was elected to replace Frank Timson (Liberal) as the member for Higinbotham.
- On 28 September 1961, Gordon Davidson (Liberal) was appointed a South Australian Senator to replace Rex Pearson (Liberal).
- Subsequent to the election, but prior to the new Senate taking its place:
  - On 8 February 1962, Gordon Davidson (Liberal) was appointed a South Australian Senator to replace Nancy Buttfield (Liberal). Davidson had been appointed to the Senate in 1961 but had not contested the 1961 election. Buttfield, a sitting Senator, had been elected to the place originally won by Rex Pearson in 1961, but resigned it in order to take up the long-term vacancy. Davidson's appointment expired on 30 June 1963.

== Retiring Members and Senators ==
=== Labor ===
- George Lawson MP (Brisbane, Qld)
- Senator John Armstrong (NSW)
- Senator Don Cameron (Vic)
- Senator Ben Courtice (Qld)
- Senator Sid O'Flaherty (SA)
- Senator Jim Sheehan (Vic)

=== Liberal ===
- Francis Bland MP (Warringah, NSW)
- Senator John McCallum (NSW)
- Senator Sir Neil O'Sullivan (Qld)
- Senator Robert Wardlaw (Tas)

=== Country ===
- George Bowden MP (Gippsland, Vic)
- Len Hamilton MP (Canning, WA)
- Senator Albert Reid (NSW)
- Senator Agnes Robertson (WA)

== House of Representatives ==
Sitting members at the time of the election are shown in bold text. Successful candidates are highlighted in the relevant colour. Where there is possible confusion, an asterisk (*) is also used.

=== Australian Capital Territory ===
Electorate	Held by	Labor candidate	Liberal candidate
Australian Capital Territory	Labor	**Jim Fraser**	Geoffrey Small

=== New South Wales ===
Electorate	Held by	Labor candidate	Coalition candidate	DLP candidate	Other candidates
Banks	Labor	**Eric Costa**	Jack Manning (Lib)	John Antill	Frank Bollins (CPA); Russell Duncan (Ind)
Barton	Labor	**Len Reynolds**	Colin Sullivan (Lib)	Thomas Brosnan	
Bennelong	Liberal	Harry Jensen	**John Cramer** (Lib)	Edward Beck	
Blaxland	Labor	**Eli Harrison**	David Cowan (Lib)	Bernard Atkinson	
Bradfield	Liberal	Percy Staines	**Harry Turner** (Lib)	Dominique Droulers	
Calare	Country	Leroy Serisier	**John England** (CP)	George Boland	
Cowper	Country	Frank McGuren	**Sir Earle Page** (CP)		Neville Weiley (Ind)
Cunningham	Labor	**Victor Kearney**	Jack Hough (Lib)		Bill McDougall (CPA)
Dalley	Labor	**William O'Connor**	Arthur Nesbitt (Lib)	Reginald Lawson	Mavis Robertson (CPA)
Darling	Labor	**Joe Clark**	Rodan Dawson (CP)		
East Sydney	Labor	**Eddie Ward**	John Folbigg (Lib)	Joseph Bergin	Bill Brown (CPA)
Eden-Monaro	Labor	**Allan Fraser**	Douglas Thomson (Lib)		
Evans	Liberal	James Monaghan	**Frederick Osborne** (Lib)	Francis Collins	Harold O'Reilly (Ind)
Farrer	Liberal	Herb McPherson	**David Fairbairn** (Lib)	William Brennan	
Grayndler	Labor	**Fred Daly**	Evan MacLaurin (Lib)	Charles McCafferty	Hal Alexander (CPA)
Gwydir	Country	Austin Heffernan	**Ian Allan** (CP)	Stanley Parmenter	
Hughes	Labor	**Les Johnson**	Keith Woodward (Lib)	Wesley Johns	
Hume	Country	Arthur Fuller	**Charles Anderson** (CP)	Charles Rowe	
Hunter	Labor	**Bert James**	Edward Farrell (Lib)		John Tapp (CPA)
Kingsford-Smith	Labor	**Dan Curtin**	Jack Cunningham (Lib)	John Cunningham	
Lang	Labor	**Frank Stewart**	Russell Carter (Lib)	Edward Byrnes	Frank Ball (Ind)
Lawson	Country	John Canobi	**Laurie Failes** (CP)	Denis Searls	
Lowe	Liberal	John Holland	**William McMahon** (Lib)	Denis Klein	Daniel Smith (ARP)
Lyne	Country	John Allan	**Philip Lucock** (CP)	Jack Collins	Joe Cordner (Ind)
Macarthur	Liberal	Don Nilon	**Jeff Bate** (Lib)		
Mackellar	Liberal	Mabel Elliott	**Bill Wentworth** (Lib)	Philip Cohen	Hugh Begg (CPA)
Macquarie	Liberal	**Tony Luchetti**	John Heesh (Lib)	Frank Mackenzie	
Mitchell	Liberal	John Armitage	**Roy Wheeler** (Lib)	Allan Dwyer	John Mantova (Ind)
New England	Country	Donald White	**David Drummond** (CP)	John Burless	
Newcastle	Labor	**Charles Jones**	Henry Wansey (Lib)	Hugh Ansell	
North Sydney	Liberal	Maurice Isaacs	**William Jack** (Lib)	Michael Fitzpatrick	
Parkes	Labor	**Les Haylen**	William Dowd (Lib)	Vincent Couch	
Parramatta	Liberal	Maxwell McLaren	**Sir Garfield Barwick** (Lib)	Reginald Andrews	Matt Munro (CPA)
Paterson	Liberal	Bob Brown	**Allen Fairhall** (Lib)	Aubrey Barr	
Phillip	Liberal	Syd Einfeld	**William Aston** (Lib)	Peter Daly	
Reid	Labor	**Tom Uren**	Jack Cook (Lib)	Mick Carroll	
Richmond	Country	Raymond Freeman	**Doug Anthony** (CP)		
Riverina	Country	Jack Ward	**Hugh Roberton** (CP)	Albert Elrington	
Robertson	Liberal	Tom Pendlebury	**Roger Dean** (Lib)	Neil Mackerras	
Shortland	Labor	**Charles Griffiths**	Allan Pitts (Lib)	Robert Burke	Geoff Curthoys (CPA)
St George	Labor	**Lionel Clay**	Clifford Amos (Lib)	Malcolm Towner	
Warringah	Liberal	James Brown	John Cockle (Lib)	John Plunkett	Rex Benson (Ind Lib); Russell Whybrow (Ind Lib)
Watson	Labor	**Jim Cope**	Sidney Pitkethly (Lib)	Mary Nappa	
Wentworth	Liberal	John Hirshman	**Les Bury** (Lib)	Francis Bull	
Werriwa	Labor	**Gough Whitlam**	Vernon Luckman (Lib)	Kevin Davis	
West Sydney	Labor	**Dan Minogue**	Milovan Kovjanic (Lib)	William Doherty	Ron Maxwell (CPA)

=== Northern Territory ===
Electorate	Held by	Labor candidate	Independent candidate
Northern Territory	Labor	**Jock Nelson**	Harold Brennan

=== Queensland ===
Electorate	Held by	Labor candidate	Coalition candidate	QLP candidate	Other candidates
Bowman	Liberal	Jack Comber	**Malcolm McColm** (Lib)	Terence Burns	
Brisbane	Labor	Manfred Cross	Kevin Cairns (Lib)	Walter Barnes	Warren Bowden (CPA)
Capricornia	Liberal	George Gray	**George Pearce** (Lib)	Mick Gardner	
Darling Downs	Liberal	Jack McCafferty	**Reginald Swartz** (Lib)	Margaret Walsh	
Dawson	Country	Cyril Mitchell	**Charles Davidson** (CP)	Waller O'Grady	
Fisher	Country	William Weir	**Charles Adermann** (CP)	John Newman	
Griffith	Liberal	Wilfred Coutts	**Arthur Chresby** (Lib)	Donald McKenna	
Herbert	Liberal	Ted Harding	**John Murray** (Lib)	Victor Bodero	Frank Bishop (CPA)
Kennedy	Labor	**Bill Riordan**	Thomas Halloran (CP)	Harry Wright	
Leichhardt	Labor	**Bill Fulton**	Reginald Wiles (CP)	Arthur Trembath	
Lilley	Liberal	Don Cameron	**Bruce Wight** (Lib)	Frank Andrews	
Maranoa	Country	Trevor Alexander	**Wilfred Brimblecombe** (CP)	Bryan Hurley	
McPherson	Country	William Ware	**Charles Barnes** (CP)	John O'Connell	Allen Kirkegaard (Ind); Thomas Masterton (Ind)
Moreton	Liberal	John O'Donnell	**James Killen** (Lib)	Christian Hagen	Max Julius (CPA)
Oxley	Liberal	Bill Hayden	**Donald Cameron** (Lib)	Kenneth Rawle	
Petrie	Liberal	Reginald O'Brien	**Alan Hulme** (Lib)	Trevor Sturling	Cecil Guilfoyle (Ind); Francis O'Mara (Ind)
Ryan	Liberal	Joy Guyatt	**Nigel Drury** (Lib)	Michael Long	
Wide Bay	Country	Brendan Hansen	**Henry Bandidt** (CP)	Edward McDonnell	James Dunn (Ind)

=== South Australia ===
Electorate	Held by	Labor candidate	Liberal candidate	DLP candidate	Other candidates
Adelaide	Labor	**Joe Sexton**	John Rundle	Ursula Cook	
Angas	Liberal	Arnold Busbridge	**Alick Downer**	John Balogh	
Barker	Liberal	Norman Alcock	**Jim Forbes**	Charles Coffey	John Gartner (Ind)
Bonython	Labor	**Norman Makin**	Margaret McLachlan	Edward Timlin	Thomas Ellis (Ind); Alan Miller (CPA)
Boothby	Liberal	Ronald Basten	**John McLeay**	Ted Farrell	
Grey	Labor	**Edgar Russell**	Arthur Dodgson	Richard Mills	
Hindmarsh	Labor	**Clyde Cameron**	Karl-Juergen Liebetrau	Cyril Holasek	
Kingston	Labor	**Pat Galvin**	John McCoy	Brian Crowe	
Port Adelaide	Labor	**Albert Thompson**	Kimball Kelly	George Basisovs	Peter Symon (CPA)
Sturt	Liberal	Arthur Penn	**Keith Wilson**	Walter Doran	
Wakefield	Liberal	Collin Wood	**Bert Kelly**	John McMahon	

=== Tasmania ===
Electorate	Held by	Labor candidate	Liberal candidate	DLP candidate
Bass	Labor	**Lance Barnard**	Fred Marriott	Francis Boland
Braddon	Labor	**Ron Davies**	William Young	Frances Lane
Denison	Liberal	Eric Howroyd	**Athol Townley**	Harold Senior
Franklin	Liberal	William Wilkinson	**Bill Falkinder**	St Clair Courtney
Wilmot	Labor	**Gil Duthie**	Royston Ringrose; Richard Thomas	Alastair Davidson

=== Victoria ===
Electorate	Held by	Labor candidate	Coalition candidate	DLP candidate	Other candidates
Balaclava	Liberal	Ernst Platz	**Ray Whittorn** (Lib)	John Ryan	John Murray (ARP)
Ballaarat	Liberal	Aubrey Keane	**Dudley Erwin** (Lib)	Bob Joshua	
Batman	Labor	**Alan Bird**	Bruce Skeggs (Lib)	Maurice Keady	
Bendigo	Labor	**Noel Beaton**	Henry Snell (Lib)	Ronald Anderson	Milan Lorman (Ind)
Bruce	Liberal	Keith Ewert	**Billy Snedden** (Lib)	Henri de Sachau	
Chisholm	Liberal	Malcolm Coughlin	**Sir Wilfrid Kent Hughes** (Lib)	John Duffy	
Corangamite	Liberal	Desmond Hulme	**Dan Mackinnon** (Lib)	Patrick Bourke	
Corio	Liberal	Lindsay Romey	**Hubert Opperman** (Lib)	James Mahoney	
Darebin	Labor	**Frank Courtnay**	John Wyss (Lib)	Tom Andrews	
Deakin	Liberal	George Slater	**Frank Davis** (Lib)	Maurice Weston	
Fawkner	Liberal	Gwendolyn Noad	**Peter Howson** (Lib)	Richard Coyne	
Flinders	Liberal	Ian Cathie	**Robert Lindsay** (Lib)	Jack Austin	Edmund Knowles (Ind)
Gellibrand	Labor	**Hector McIvor**	Reginald Cannon (Lib)	Jan Roszkowski	Frank Johnson (CPA)
Gippsland	Country	William Stephenson	Peter Nixon (CP)	John Hansen	
Henty	Liberal	Sir George Jones	**Max Fox** (Lib)	Henry Moore	
Higgins	Liberal	Roger Kirby	**Harold Holt** (Lib)	Celia Laird	
Higinbotham	Liberal	Henry Fowler	**Don Chipp** (Lib)	William Cameron	
Indi	Country	Mervyn Huggins	Malcolm Cameron (Lib); **Mac Holten*** (CP)	George Taylor	
Isaacs	Liberal	Angus McLean	**William Haworth** (Lib)	John Hughes	
Kooyong	Liberal	Moss Cass	**Robert Menzies** (Lib)	Thomas Brennan	Goldie Collins (Ind); Bill Tregear (CPA)
Lalor	Labor	**Reg Pollard**	Peter Kemp (Lib)	John Donnellon	Kenneth Agius (CCP)
La Trobe	Liberal	Don Pritchard	**John Jess** (Lib)	John Hoare	Bernard Rees (CCP)
Mallee	Country	Murray Homes	**Winton Turnbull** (CP)	Michael Howley	
Maribyrnong	Liberal	Neil Armour	**Philip Stokes** (Lib)	Paul Gunn	Norman McClure (CCP)
McMillan	Liberal	James Longstaff	**Alex Buchanan*** (Lib); Francis Hawtin (CP)	Les Hilton	Patrick Linane (ARP)
Melbourne	Labor	**Arthur Calwell**	James Moloney (Lib)	Michael Kearney	
Melbourne Ports	Labor	**Frank Crean**	Gordon Blackburne (Lib)	Albert Jones	Roger Wilson (CPA)
Murray	Country	Neil Frankland	**John McEwen** (CP)	Brian Lacey	
Scullin	Labor	**Ted Peters**	Rex Schurmann (Lib)	Barry O'Brien	
Wannon	Liberal	Jack Stanford	**Malcolm Fraser** (Lib)	Terence Callander	
Wills	Labor	**Gordon Bryant**	William Pyatt (Lib)	Bill Bryson	
Wimmera	Country	Thomas Windsor	**Robert King*** (CP); William Lawrence (Lib)	Joseph Murphy	
Yarra	Labor	**Jim Cairns**	Andrew Peacock (Lib)	Stan Keon	Geoffrey Broomhall (CCP); Ken Miller (CPA)

=== Western Australia ===
Electorate	Held by	Labor candidate	Coalition candidate	DLP candidate	Other candidates
Canning	Country	Charles Edwards	John Hallett (CP); Neil McNeill* (Lib)	Stanley Meredith	
Curtin	Liberal	George Piesley	**Paul Hasluck** (Lib)	Wilfred Bodeker	
Forrest	Liberal	Ernest Stapleton	**Gordon Freeth** (Lib)		
Fremantle	Labor	**Kim Beazley**	John Waghorne (Lib)		Joan Williams (CPA)
Kalgoorlie	Liberal	Fred Collard	**Peter Browne** (Lib)	George Jensen	Harold Illingworth (Ind)
Moore	Country	Wilbur Bennett	**Hugh Halbert** (Lib); Hugh Leslie* (CP)	John Crisafulli	
Perth	Liberal	Laurie Wilkinson	**Fred Chaney** (Lib)	Julius Re	
Stirling	Liberal	Harry Webb	**Doug Cash** (Lib)	Adrian Briffa	Jack Marks (CPA)
Swan	Liberal	Ted Johnson	**Richard Cleaver** (Lib)	Terence Merchant	

== Senate ==
Sitting Senators are shown in bold text. Tickets that elected at least one Senator are highlighted in the relevant colour. Successful candidates are identified by an asterisk (*).

=== New South Wales ===
Five seats were up for election. The Labor Party was defending one seat. The Liberal-Country Coalition was defending four seats. Senators Stan Amour (Labor), Ken Anderson (Liberal), James Arnold (Labor), Sir Alister McMullin (Liberal) and James Ormonde (Labor) were not up for re-election.

Labor candidates	Coalition candidates	DLP candidates	Communist candidates	Social Credit candidates	Pensioners candidates
1. Joe Fitzgerald*; 2. Lionel Murphy*; 3. Doug McClelland*	1. **Bill Spooner*** (Lib); 2. **Colin McKellar*** (CP); 3. Eileen Furley (Lib)	1. Jack Kane; 2. Jan Van Der Rijt; 3. Colin MacNaught	1. Laurie Aarons; 2. Freda Brown; 3. Les Kelton	1. William Ward; 2. Albert Lee; 3. Kenneth Whiteman	1. William Dawson; 2. Charles Johnston; 3. William Shaw
Republican candidates	Group C candidates	Ungrouped candidates			
1. John Phillips; 2. Keith Fitzgerald	1. Edward Spensley; 2. Arthur Ryan	Herbert Daley; Ben Bernard; Albert Milne			

=== Queensland ===
Five seats were up for election. The Labor Party was defending two seats. The Liberal-Country Coalition was defending three seats. Senators Gordon Brown (Labor), Felix Dittmer (Labor), Roy Kendall (Liberal), Ted Maher (Country) and Ian Wood (Liberal) were not up for re-election.

Labor candidates	Coalition candidates	QLP candidates	Communist candidates	Group D candidates	Ungrouped candidates
1. **Archie Benn***; 2. Max Poulter*; 3. Alf Arnell	1. **Sir Walter Cooper*** (CP); 2. **Dame Annabelle Rankin*** (Lib); 3. Bob Sherrington* (Lib)	1. Vince Gair; 2. Jack Williams; 3. Anne Wenck	1. Claude Jones; 2. John Nolan; 3. Pat Pastourel	1. Patrick Curtis; 2. Charles Stuckey	James Dwyer; Damien Kennedy; Lyndon Barker

=== South Australia ===
Six seats were up for election. One of these was a short-term vacancy caused by Liberal Senator Rex Pearson's death; this had been filled in the interim by Liberal Gordon Davidson. The Labor Party was defending two seats. The Liberal Party was defending four seats. Senators Arnold Drury (Labor), Keith Laught (Liberal), Clem Ridley (Labor) and Jim Toohey (Labor) were not up for re-election.

Labor candidates	Liberal candidates	DLP candidates	Communist candidates
1. **Theo Nicholls***; 2. Reg Bishop*; 3. Jim Cavanagh*	1. **Ted Mattner***; 2. **Clive Hannaford***; 3. **Nancy Buttfield***	1. Francis Moran; 2. Daniel Smith; 3. Brian Nash	1. Alan Finger; 2. John Sendy; 3. Joseph Buchanan

=== Tasmania ===
Five seats were up for election. The Labor Party was defending two seats. The Liberal Party was defending three seats. Senators Bill Aylett (Labor), George Cole (Democratic Labor), Elliot Lillico (Liberal), John Marriott (Liberal) and Justin O'Byrne (Labor) were not up for re-election.

Labor candidates	Liberal candidates	DLP candidates	Communist candidates	Ungrouped candidates
1. **Nick McKenna***; 2. **Bob Poke***; 3. Don Devitt	1. **Denham Henty***; 2. **Reg Wright***; 3. John Orchard	1. Virgil Morgan; 2. John Mortimer; 3. Eleonora Tennant	1. Max Bound; 2. George Chenery; 3. Peter Cundall	Reg Turnbull*

=== Victoria ===
Five seats were up for election. The Labor Party was defending three seats. The Liberal-Country Coalition was defending one seat. The Democratic Labor Party was defending one seat. Senators John Gorton (Liberal), George Hannan (Liberal), Bert Hendrickson (Labor), Pat Kennelly (Labor) and Ivy Wedgwood (Liberal) were not up for re-election.

Labor candidates	Coalition candidates	DLP candidates	Communist candidates	Republican candidates	Centre candidates
1. **Charles Sandford***; 2. Sam Cohen*; 3. Sam Benson	1. Magnus Cormack* (Lib); 2. **Harrie Wade*** (CP); 3. Marie Breen* (Lib)	1. **Frank McManus**; 2. Jack Little; 3. John Meere	1. Ralph Gibson; 2. Kath Williams; 3. Andy Wallace	1. Gerald Fitzgerald; 2. Richard Mullins	1. Anthony van de Loo; 2. Robert Huart; 3. Frank McCaw
Ungrouped candidates					
John Dunstan; Louis Cole					

=== Western Australia ===
Five seats were up for election. The Labor Party was defending two seats. The Liberal Party was defending two seats. The Country Party was defending one seat. Senators George Branson (Liberal), Harry Cant (Labor), Joe Cooke (Labor), Tom Drake-Brockman (Country) and Malcolm Scott (Liberal) were not up for re-election.

Labor candidates	Liberal candidates	Country candidates	DLP candidates	Communist candidates	Ungrouped candidates
1. **Dorothy Tangney***; 2. **Don Willesee***; 3. Charles Edwards	1. **Shane Paltridge***; 2. **Seddon Vincent***; 3. Valerie Goode	1. Edgar Prowse*; 2. John Powell; 3. Clayton Mitchell	1. Brian Peachey; 2. Gilbert Handcock; 3. Francis Hrubos; 4. Percival Bonser	1. Paddy Troy; 2. Bill Latter; 3. John Gandini	Stephen Kellow; Robert Salter

== Summary by party ==
Beside each party is the number of seats contested by that party in the House of Representatives for each state, as well as an indication of whether the party contested Senate elections in each state.

Party	NSW		Vic		Qld		WA		SA		Tas		ACT	NT	Total	
Party	HR	S	HR	S	HR	S	HR	S	HR	S	HR	S	HR	HR	HR	S
Australian Labor Party	46	*	33	*	18	*	9	*	11	*	5	*	1	1	124	6
Liberal Party of Australia	36	*	30	*	11	*	9	*	11	*	6	*	1		105	6
Australian Country Party	10	*	6	*	7	*	2	*							25	4
Democratic Labor Party	40	*	33	*			7	*	11	*	5	*			96	5
Communist Party of Australia	10	*	4	*	3	*	2	*	2	*		*			21	6
Queensland Labor Party					18	*									18	1
Commonwealth Centre Party			4	*											4	1
Australian Republican Party	1	*	2	*											3	2
Social Credit Party		*														1
Pensioner Party of Australia		*														1
Independent and other	8		3		5		1		2					1	20	

== See also ==
- 1961 Australian federal election
- Members of the Australian House of Representatives, 1958–1961
- Members of the Australian House of Representatives, 1961–1963
- Members of the Australian Senate, 1959–1962
- Members of the Australian Senate, 1962–1965
- List of political parties in Australia
