= 1960 Australian Labor Party leadership election =

1960 Australian Labor Party Leadership election
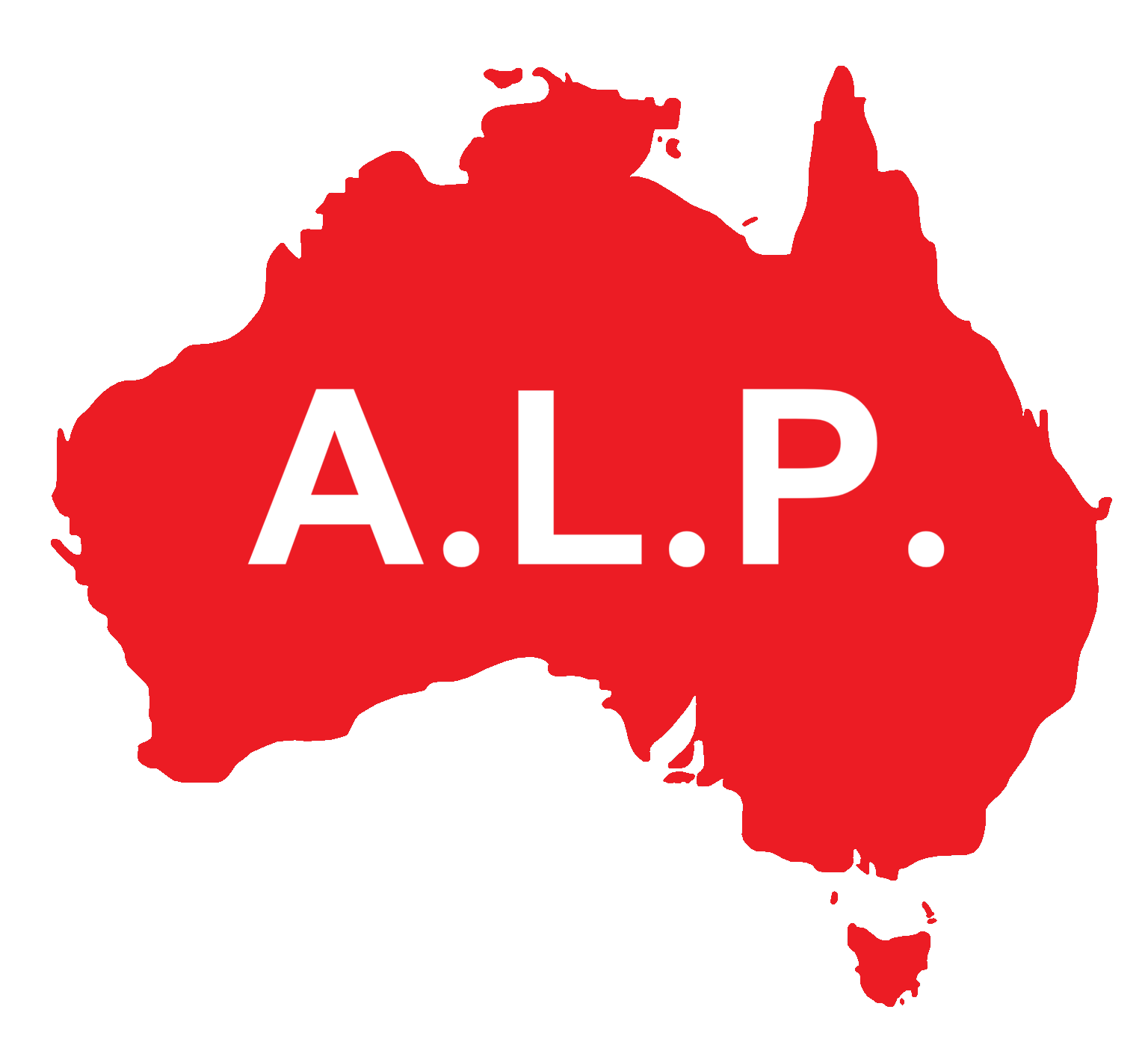
- 7 March 1960
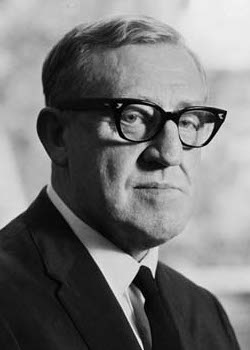

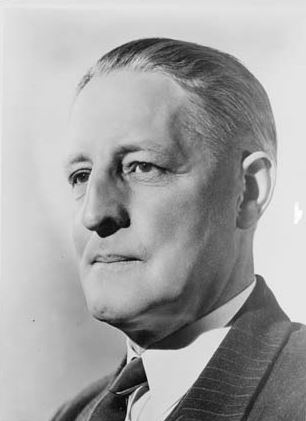
Candidate	Arthur Calwell	Reg Pollard
Caucus vote	42 (58.3%)	30 (41.7%)
Leader before election
H. V. Evatt
Elected Leader
Arthur Calwell

A leadership ballot in the Australian Labor Party, the opposition party in the Parliament of Australia, was held on 7 March 1960. It followed the retirement of previous leader H. V. Evatt. Calwell received 42 votes to Reg Pollard's 30 in a caucus ballot. Future Prime Minister Gough Whitlam would defeat Eddie Ward to become Calwell's deputy.

This marked the first time that the party elected a new leader which wasn't triggered by the death of an incumbent leader since the retirement of former Prime Minister James Scullin as leader in 1935.

== Results ==
=== Leader ===
The following table gives the ballot results:

Name	Votes	Percentage
Arthur Calwell	42	58.33
Reg Pollard	30	41.66

=== Deputy leader ===
The following table gives the ballot results:

Candidate	1st ballot	2nd ballot	3rd ballot
Gough Whitlam	22	28	38
Eddie Ward	28	32	34
Les Haylen	12	12	Eliminated
Eli Harrison	10	Eliminated	
