= Commonwealth Centre Party =

Australian political party

The Commonwealth Centre Party was a minor Australian political party that contested the 1961 federal election. It was formed by disaffected members of the Liberal Party. It had little success and was wound up soon after the election.
