= 1969 Australian House of Representatives election =

This is a list of electoral division results for the Australian 1969 federal election.

== Overall ==
This section is an excerpt from 1969 Australian federal election § Results

House of Reps (IRV) — 1969–72—Turnout 94.97% (CV) — Informal 2.54%
Party	First preference votes	%	Swing	Seats	Change
Labor	2,870,792	46.95	+6.97	59	+18
Liberal–Country coalition	2,649,219	43.33	–6.65	66	–16
Liberal	2,125,987	34.77	–5.37	46	–15
Country	523,232	8.56	–1.28	20	–1
Democratic Labor	367,977	6.02	–1.29	0	0
Australia	53,646	0.88	+0.88	0	0
Pensioner Power	7,706	0.13	+0.13	0	0
Social Credit	5,156	0.08	+0.08	0	0
Communist	4,920	0.08	–0.32	0	0
Independents	141,090	2.53	+1.08	0	–1
Total	6,114,118			125	+1
Two-party-preferred (estimated)
Liberal–Country coalition	Win	49.80	–7.10	66	–16
Labor		50.20	+7.10	59	+18

First preference vote
Labor	46.95%
Liberal	34.77%
Country	8.56%
DLP	6.02%
Australia	0.88%
Independents	2.31%
Other	0.51%

Two-party-preferred vote
Labor	50.20%
Coalition	49.80%

Parliament seats
Coalition	52.80%
Labor	47.20%

== New South Wales ==
1969 Australian federal election (New South Wales)
- 25 October 1969

All 45 NSW seats in the House of Representatives 23 seats needed for a majority
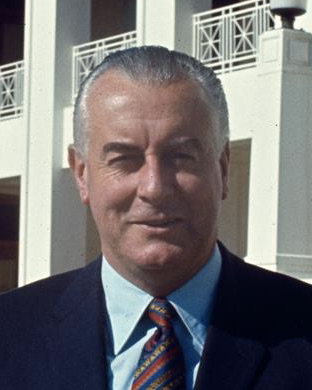

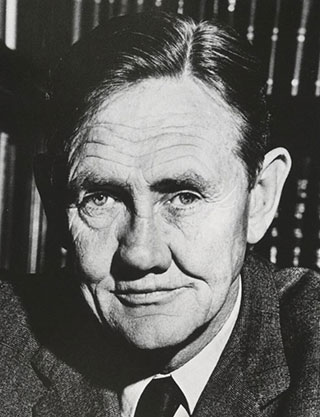
	First party	Second party
Leader	Gough Whitlam	John Gorton
Party	Labor	Coalition
Seats before	17	29
Seats won	22	23
Seat change	▲6	▼6
Popular vote	1,074,916	981,151
Percentage	47.7%	43.5%
Swing	▲7.0pp	▼7.9pp
TPP	51.9%	48.4%
TPP swing	▲8.0pp	▼8.0pp

=== Banks ===
This section is an excerpt from Electoral results for the Division of Banks § 1969

1969 Australian federal election: Banks
Party	Candidate	Votes	%	±%
Labor	Vince Martin	25,485	51.2	+6.3
Liberal	Herman Tibben	15,102	30.4	−17.4
Independent	Peter Allen	5,949	12.0	+12.0
Independent	Reginald Jones	1,805	3.6	+3.6
Democratic Labor	Annette Andrew	1,030	2.1	−2.6
Independent	Kevin Watt	363	0.7	+0.7
Total formal votes		49,734	97.7	+2.0
Informal votes		1,166	2.3	−2.0
Turnout		50,900	96.7	−0.8
Two-party-preferred result
Labor	Vince Martin		62.0	+11.8
Liberal	Herman Tibben		38.0	−11.8
Labor hold		Swing	+11.8	

=== Barton ===
This section is an excerpt from Electoral results for the Division of Barton § 1969

1969 Australian federal election: Barton
Party	Candidate	Votes	%	±%
Labor	Len Reynolds	27,628	50.5	+4.1
Liberal	Bill Arthur	23,576	43.1	−7.0
Independent	Alan Reed	1,885	3.4	+3.4
Democratic Labor	Charles Chapman	1,220	2.2	−0.5
Independent	Charles Bellchambers	214	0.4	−0.4
Independent	Ray Emmerson	171	0.3	+0.3
Total formal votes		54,694	98.2	
Informal votes		1,001	1.8	
Turnout		55,695	96.3	
Two-party-preferred result
Labor	Len Reynolds		53.0	+5.7
Liberal	Bill Arthur		47.0	−5.7
Labor gain from Liberal		Swing	+5.7	

=== Bennelong ===
This section is an excerpt from Electoral results for the Division of Bennelong § 1969

1969 Australian federal election: Bennelong
Party	Candidate	Votes	%	±%
Liberal	Sir John Cramer	26,974	48.6	−13.5
Labor	Peter Evatt	20,402	36.7	+11.1
Australia	Kenneth Cook	3,144	5.7	+5.7
Democratic Labor	Ronald Claridge	2,524	4.5	−0.6
Independent	Allan Horton	2,495	4.5	+4.5
Total formal votes		55,539	97.7	
Informal votes		1,291	2.3	
Turnout		56,830	94.6	
Two-party-preferred result
Liberal	Sir John Cramer		56.8	−11.4
Labor	Peter Evatt		43.2	+11.4
Liberal hold		Swing	−11.4	

=== Berowra ===
This section is an excerpt from Electoral results for the Division of Berowra § 1969

1969 Australian federal election: Berowra
Party	Candidate	Votes	%	±%
Liberal	Tom Hughes	22,495	45.5	−20.4
Labor	George Williams	15,108	30.6	+7.3
Independent	Edith Parrish	6,095	12.3	+12.3
Australia	David Haig	3,401	6.9	+6.9
Democratic Labor	Neil Mackerras	2,288	4.6	+4.6
Total formal votes		49,387	97.9	
Informal votes		1,034	2.1	
Turnout		50.421	94.2	
Two-party-preferred result
Liberal	Tom Hughes		59.5	−13.0
Labor	George Williams		40.5	+13.0
Liberal notional hold		Swing	−13.0	

=== Blaxland ===
This section is an excerpt from Electoral results for the Division of Blaxland § 1969

1969 Australian federal election: Blaxland
Party	Candidate	Votes	%	±%
Labor	Paul Keating	32,426	61.7	+10.1
Liberal	John Ghent	16,658	31.7	−11.5
Democratic Labor	Joseph Conroy	3,493	6.6	+1.4
Total formal votes		52,577	97.2	
Informal votes		1,508	2.8	
Turnout		54,085	95.1	
Two-party-preferred result
Labor	Paul Keating		62.8	+10.2
Liberal	John Ghent		37.2	−10.2
Labor hold		Swing	+10.2	

=== Bradfield ===
This section is an excerpt from Electoral results for the Division of Bradfield § 1969

1969 Australian federal election: Bradfield
Party	Candidate	Votes	%	±%
Liberal	Harry Turner	34,184	63.0	−16.3
Labor	Keith Crook	12,364	22.8	+8.3
Democratic Labor	Anthony Felton	3,085	5.7	−0.5
Independent	Betty Loneragan	2,306	4.3	+4.3
Australia	Barbara Wilson	2,293	4.2	+4.2
Total formal votes		54,232	98.6	
Informal votes		755	1.4	
Turnout		54,987	95.4	
Two-party-preferred result
Liberal	Harry Turner		71.4	−12.9
Labor	Keith Crook		28.6	+12.9
Liberal hold		Swing	−12.9	

=== Calare ===
This section is an excerpt from Electoral results for the Division of Calare § 1969

1969 Australian federal election: Calare
Party	Candidate	Votes	%	±%
Country	John England	23,384	52.5	−7.6
Labor	Kerry Scott	18,381	41.3	+9.0
Democratic Labor	John Grant	2,764	6.2	−1.4
Total formal votes		44,529	98.9	
Informal votes		477	1.1	
Turnout		45,006	96.1	
Two-party-preferred result
Country	John England		57.5	−8.7
Labor	Kerry Scott		42.5	+8.7
Country hold		Swing	−8.7	

=== Chifley ===
This section is an excerpt from Electoral results for the Division of Chifley § 1969

1969 Australian federal election: Chifley
Party	Candidate	Votes	%	±%
Labor	John Armitage	31,133	61.9	+16.2
Liberal	Milovan Kovjanic	13,234	26.3	−18.5
Independent	Victor Corcoran	4,283	8.5	+8.5
Democratic Labor	Stan Aster-Stater	1,651	3.3	−0.7
Total formal votes		50,301	96.9	
Informal votes		1,607	3.1	
Turnout		51,908	94.7	
Two-party-preferred result
Labor	John Armitage		66.8	+16.6
Liberal	Milovan Kovjanic		33.2	−16.6
Labor notional hold		Swing	+16.6	

=== Cook ===
This section is an excerpt from Electoral results for the Division of Cook § 1969

1969 Australian federal election: Cook
Party	Candidate	Votes	%	±%
Liberal	Don Dobie	24,997	49.2	−5.9
Labor	Cliff Mallam	22,192	43.6	+1.2
Independent	Robin Alleway	2,766	5.4	+5.4
Australia	Bernard Walrut	907	1.8	+1.8
Total formal votes		50,862	98.5	
Informal votes		797	1.5	
Turnout		51,659	95.8	
Two-party-preferred result
Liberal	Don Dobie	26,861	52.8	−4.5
Labor	Cliff Mallam	24,001	47.2	+4.5
Liberal notional hold		Swing	−4.5	

=== Cowper ===
This section is an excerpt from Electoral results for the Division of Cowper § 1969

1969 Australian federal election: Cowper
Party	Candidate	Votes	%	±%
Country	Ian Robinson	27,681	62.9	−1.6
Independent	Neil Royal	10,351	23.5	+23.5
Independent	Brian Richards	5,965	13.6	+13.6
Total formal votes		43,977	98.5	
Informal votes		649	1.5	
Turnout		44,646	95.5	
Two-party-preferred result
Country	Ian Robinson		65.5	−1.6
Independent	Neil Royal		34.5	+34.5
Country hold		Swing	−1.6	

=== Cunningham ===
This section is an excerpt from Electoral results for the Division of Cunningham § 1969

1969 Australian federal election: Cunningham
Party	Candidate	Votes	%	±%
Labor	Rex Connor	35,092	64.0	+11.9
Liberal	John Poel	18,618	34.0	−8.4
Communist	Reg Wilding	1,126	2.1	+0.4
Total formal votes		54,836	97.1	
Informal votes		1,643	2.9	
Turnout		56,479	95.2	
Two-party-preferred result
Labor	Rex Connor		65.9	+10.3
Liberal	John Poel		34.1	−10.3
Labor hold		Swing	+10.3	

=== Darling ===
This section is an excerpt from Electoral results for the Division of Darling § 1969

1969 Australian federal election: Darling
Party	Candidate	Votes	%	±%
Labor	John FitzPatrick	23,168	57.5	+1.1
Country	Max Overton	9,474	23.5	+23.5
Liberal	Jack Bonney	7,650	19.0	−21.8
Total formal votes		40,292	98.4	
Informal votes		642	1.6	
Turnout		40,934	94.3	
Two-party-preferred result
Labor	John FitzPatrick		60.3	+2.2
Country	Max Overton		39.7	−2.2
Labor hold		Swing	+2.2	

=== Eden-Monaro ===
This section is an excerpt from Electoral results for the Division of Eden-Monaro § 1969

1969 Australian federal election: Eden-Monaro
Party	Candidate	Votes	%	±%
Labor	Allan Fraser	23,482	51.2	+5.4
Liberal	Dugald Munro	20,436	44.6	+1.9
Democratic Labor	John Donohue	1,342	2.9	−0.1
Australia	Patrick Starrs	575	1.3	+1.3
Total formal votes		45,835	98.5	
Informal votes		717	1.5	
Turnout		46,552	95.8	
Two-party-preferred result
Labor	Allan Fraser		53.2	+5.8
Liberal	Dugald Munro		46.8	−5.8
Labor gain from Liberal		Swing	+5.8	

=== Evans ===
This section is an excerpt from Electoral results for the Division of Evans § 1969

1969 Australian federal election: Evans
Party	Candidate	Votes	%	±%
Labor	James Monaghan	24,054	45.4	+8.9
Liberal	Malcolm Mackay	23,527	44.4	−8.1
Democratic Labor	Kevin Davis	2,798	5.3	+0.3
Australia	John Fisher	1,550	2.9	+2.9
Independent	Hal Saunders	1,010	1.9	+1.9
Total formal votes		52,939	96.4	
Informal votes		1,950	3.6	
Turnout		54,889	93.5	
Two-party-preferred result
Liberal	Malcolm Mackay	27,100	51.2	−9.0
Labor	James Monaghan	25,839	48.8	+9.0
Liberal hold		Swing	−9.0	

=== Farrer ===
This section is an excerpt from Electoral results for the Division of Farrer § 1969

1969 Australian federal election: Farrer
Party	Candidate	Votes	%	±%
Liberal	David Fairbairn	26,058	54.9	−11.0
Labor	Noel Murray	15,324	32.3	+8.1
Democratic Labor	James Keogh	3,507	7.4	−2.5
Independent	John Ross	2,574	5.4	+5.4
Total formal votes		47,463	98.7	
Informal votes		625	1.3	
Turnout		48,088	95.8	
Two-party-preferred result
Liberal	David Fairbairn		63.5	−11.3
Labor	Noel Murray		36.5	+11.3
Liberal hold		Swing	−11.3	

=== Grayndler ===
This section is an excerpt from Electoral results for the Division of Grayndler § 1969

1969 Australian federal election: Grayndler
Party	Candidate	Votes	%	±%
Labor	Fred Daly	37,161	71.9	+11.7
Liberal	Jonathan Fowler	14,516	28.1	−5.2
Total formal votes		51,677	96.0	
Informal votes		2,150	4.0	
Turnout		53,827	91.6	
Labor hold		Swing	+9.6	

=== Gwydir ===
This section is an excerpt from Electoral results for the Division of Gwydir § 1969

1969 Australian federal election: Gwydir
Party	Candidate	Votes	%	±%
Country	Ralph Hunt	22,735	50.0	−11.1
Labor	Roger Nott	20,143	44.3	+5.4
Australia	Brian Edwards	2,014	4.4	+4.4
Independent	Halwyn Webster	546	1.2	+1.2
Total formal votes		45,438	98.7	
Informal votes		619	1.3	
Turnout		46,057	95.7	
Two-party-preferred result
Country	Ralph Hunt		53.0	−8.1
Labor	Roger Nott		47.0	+8.1
Country hold		Swing	−8.1	

=== Hughes ===
This section is an excerpt from Electoral results for the Division of Hughes § 1969

1969 Australian federal election: Hughes
Party	Candidate	Votes	%	±%
Labor	Les Johnson	30,004	61.3	+4.1
Liberal	Carl Leddy	14,162	29.0	−11.2
Independent	Marjorie Williams	3,169	6.5	+6.5
Democratic Labor	William Goslett	1,577	3.2	+0.6
Total formal votes		48,912	98.2	
Informal votes		920	1.8	
Turnout		49,832	96.0	
Two-party-preferred result
Labor	Les Johnson		66.0	+8.3
Liberal	Carl Leddy		34.0	−8.3
Labor notional hold		Swing	+8.3	

=== Hume ===
This section is an excerpt from Electoral results for the Division of Hume § 1969

1969 Australian federal election: Hume
Party	Candidate	Votes	%	±%
Country	Ian Pettitt	20,845	46.5	−7.5
Labor	Frank Olley	20,691	46.1	+7.5
Democratic Labor	James Manwaring	3,331	7.4	+0.1
Total formal votes		44,867	99.1	
Informal votes		428	0.9	
Turnout		45,295	96.1	
Two-party-preferred result
Country	Ian Pettitt		51.0	−8.0
Labor	Frank Olley		49.0	+8.0
Country hold		Swing	−8.0	

=== Hunter ===
This section is an excerpt from Electoral results for the Division of Hunter § 1969

1969 Australian federal election: Hunter
Party	Candidate	Votes	%	±%
Labor	Bert James	36,504	73.5	+4.3
Liberal	Raymond Hughes	13,159	26.5	+4.1
Total formal votes		49,663	97.6	
Informal votes		1,205	2.4	
Turnout		50,868	96.1	
Labor hold		Swing	+2.6	

=== Kingsford Smith ===
This section is an excerpt from Electoral results for the Division of Kingsford Smith § 1969

1969 Australian federal election: Kingsford-Smith
Party	Candidate	Votes	%	±%
Labor	Lionel Bowen	31,163	58.8	+4.2
Liberal	Barry Morrison	16,616	31.4	−9.0
Democratic Labor	Graham Bennett	2,908	5.5	+0.4
Pensioner Power	Beverly Chong	2,283	4.3	+4.3
Total formal votes		52,970	97.0	
Informal votes		1,626	3.0	
Turnout		54,596	93.5	
Two-party-preferred result
Labor	Lionel Bowen		62.9	+7.3
Liberal	Barry Morrison		37.1	−7.3
Labor hold		Swing	+7.3	

=== Lang ===
This section is an excerpt from Electoral results for the Division of Lang § 1969

1969 Australian federal election: Lang
Party	Candidate	Votes	%	±%
Labor	Frank Stewart	29,748	58.4	+7.5
Liberal	Stanley Duncan	17,144	33.6	−10.0
Democratic Labor	Dominique Droulers	1,754	3.4	−2.1
Independent	Bert Tripet	1,617	3.2	+3.2
Communist	Jack Mundey	696	1.4	+1.4
Total formal votes		50,959	97.3	
Informal votes		1,414	2.7	
Turnout		52,373	94.8	
Two-party-preferred result
Labor	Frank Stewart		61.7	+9.9
Liberal	Stanley Duncan		38.3	−9.9
Labor hold		Swing	+9.9	

=== Lowe ===
This section is an excerpt from Electoral results for the Division of Lowe § 1969

1969 Australian federal election: Lowe
Party	Candidate	Votes	%	±%
Liberal	William McMahon	25,317	48.2	−12.0
Labor	Peter Young	21,586	41.1	+8.4
Independent	Patricia Bailey	2,417	4.6	+4.6
Independent	Bernard MacMahon	1,700	3.2	+3.2
Democratic Labor	Agnes Bannon	1,490	2.8	−0.3
Total formal votes		52,510	97.2	
Informal votes		1,534	2.8	
Turnout		54,044	94.0	
Two-party-preferred result
Liberal	William McMahon		54.9	−9.1
Labor	Peter Young		45.1	+9.1
Liberal hold		Swing	−9.1	

=== Lyne ===
This section is an excerpt from Electoral results for the Division of Lyne § 1969

1969 Australian federal election: Lyne
Party	Candidate	Votes	%	±%
Country	Philip Lucock	25,898	58.8	−6.9
Labor	John Allan	15,631	35.5	+5.5
Australia	Percival McPherson	1,561	3.5	+3.5
Independent	Joe Cordner	973	2.2	+0.1
Total formal votes		44,063	98.5	
Informal votes		664	1.5	
Turnout		44,727	95.3	
Two-party-preferred result
Country	Philip Lucock		61.3	−6.6
Labor	John Allan		38.7	+6.6
Country hold		Swing	−6.6	

=== Macarthur ===
This section is an excerpt from Electoral results for the Division of Macarthur § 1969

1969 Australian federal election: Macarthur
Party	Candidate	Votes	%	±%
Liberal	Jeff Bate	25,742	51.0	−13.0
Labor	Bob Whan	21,434	42.4	+10.0
Australia	Brian Wyer	2,422	4.8	+4.8
Pensioner Power	Sidney Sheedy	917	1.8	+1.8
Total formal votes		50,515	98.5	
Informal votes		761	1.5	
Turnout		51,276	95.3	
Two-party-preferred result
Liberal	Jeff Bate		53.8	−12.6
Labor	Bob Whan		46.2	+12.6
Liberal hold		Swing	−12.6	

=== Mackellar ===
This section is an excerpt from Electoral results for the Division of Mackellar § 1969

1969 Australian federal election: Mackellar
Party	Candidate	Votes	%	±%
Liberal	Bill Wentworth	29,136	56.7	−10.3
Labor	William Bramwell	19,516	37.9	+15.5
Democratic Labor	Thomas Colman	2,775	5.4	+1.9
Total formal votes		51,427	98.0	
Informal votes		1,060	2.0	
Turnout		52,487	94.1	
Two-party-preferred result
Liberal	Bill Wentworth		61.0	−11.0
Labor	William Bramwell		39.0	+11.0
Liberal hold		Swing	−11.0	

=== Macquarie ===
This section is an excerpt from Electoral results for the Division of Macquarie § 1969

1969 Australian federal election: Macquarie
Party	Candidate	Votes	%	±%
Labor	Tony Luchetti	31,403	58.1	+6.7
Liberal	John MacDonnell	18,391	34.0	−5.5
Democratic Labor	Leslie Clarke	2,926	5.4	−2.8
Australia	Norman Lee	1,343	2.5	+2.5
Total formal votes		54,063	98.1	
Informal votes		1,016	1.9	
Turnout		55,079	95.3	
Two-party-preferred result
Labor	Tony Luchetti		62.6	+9.4
Liberal	John MacDonnell		37.4	−9.4
Labor hold		Swing	+9.4	

=== Mitchell ===
This section is an excerpt from Electoral results for the Division of Mitchell § 1969

1969 Australian federal election: Mitchell
Party	Candidate	Votes	%	±%
Liberal	Les Irwin	25,560	47.7	−4.0
Labor	Alfred Ashley-Brown	23,907	44.7	+8.5
Democratic Labor	John Maguire	1,773	3.3	+0.1
Australia	Gordon Waller	1,244	2.3	+2.3
Pensioner Power	Harvey Clift	1,055	2.0	+2.0
Total formal votes		53,539	97.7	
Informal votes		1,275	2.3	
Turnout		54,814	95.0	
Two-party-preferred result
Liberal	Les Irwin	28,111	52.5	−6.7
Labor	Alfred Ashley-Brown	25,428	47.5	+6.7
Liberal hold		Swing	−6.7	

=== New England ===
This section is an excerpt from Electoral results for the Division of New England § 1969

1969 Australian federal election: New England
Party	Candidate	Votes	%	±%
Country	Ian Sinclair	28,421	59.1	−7.6
Labor	Alan Kitson	19,707	40.9	+7.6
Total formal votes		48,128	98.8	
Informal votes		575	1.2	
Turnout		48,703	95.9	
Country hold		Swing	−7.6	

=== Newcastle ===
This section is an excerpt from Electoral results for the Division of Newcastle1969

1969 Australian federal election: Newcastle
Party	Candidate	Votes	%	±%
Labor	Charles Jones	32,469	62.9	+7.6
Liberal	Alfred Appleby	17,662	34.2	−0.7
Australia	Wlodzimierz Bohakto	1,505	2.9	+2.9
Total formal votes		51,636	98.1	
Informal votes		1,027	1.9	
Turnout		52,663	95.0	
Two-party-preferred result
Labor	Charles Jones		64.6	+6.6
Liberal	Alfred Appleby		35.4	−6.6
Labor hold		Swing	+6.6	

=== North Sydney ===
This section is an excerpt from Electoral results for the Division of North Sydney § 1969

1969 Australian federal election: North Sydney
Party	Candidate	Votes	%	±%
Liberal	Bill Graham	29,933	57.5	−4.5
Labor	Mervyn Page	18,524	35.6	+13.4
Democratic Labor	Reginald Lawson	2,622	5.0	−1.7
Independent	Romualds Kemps	984	1.9	+1.7
Total formal votes		52,063	97.7	
Informal votes		1,206	2.3	
Turnout		53,269	91.7	
Two-party-preferred result
Liberal	Bill Graham		62.5	−8.3
Labor	Mervyn Page		37.5	+8.3
Liberal hold		Swing	−8.3	

=== Parramatta ===
This section is an excerpt from Electoral results for the Division of Parramatta § 1969

1969 Australian federal election: Parramatta
Party	Candidate	Votes	%	±%
Liberal	Nigel Bowen	27,131	47.0	−10.0
Labor	Barry Wilde	25,732	44.6	+13.0
Democratic Labor	Hans Andreasson	2,508	4.3	−0.8
Independent	John Keeffe	2,066	3.6	+3.6
Independent	Leonard Kiernan	240	0.4	+0.4
Total formal votes		57,677	98.1	
Informal votes		1,144	1.9	
Turnout		58,821	94.7	
Two-party-preferred result
Liberal	Nigel Bowen	30,374	52.7	−9.9
Labor	Barry Wilde	27,303	47.3	+9.9
Liberal hold		Swing	−9.9	

=== Paterson ===
This section is an excerpt from Electoral results for the Division of Paterson § 1969

1969 Australian federal election: Paterson
Party	Candidate	Votes	%	±%
Labor	Francis Murray	16,741	37.5	+4.4
Country	Frank O'Keefe	13,150	29.4	+29.4
Liberal	John Jobling	12,500	28.0	−31.7
Democratic Labor	Jack Collins	1,805	4.0	−3.2
Independent	Adrian Edwards	252	0.6	+0.6
Australia	Ted Fletcher	227	0.5	+0.5
Total formal votes		44,675	96.9	
Informal votes		1,451	3.1	
Turnout		46,126	96.6	
Two-party-preferred result
Country	Frank O'Keefe	25,692	57.5	+57.5
Labor	Francis Murray	18,983	42.5	+9.1
Country gain from Liberal		Swing	−9.1	

=== Phillip ===
This section is an excerpt from Electoral results for the Division of Phillip § 1969

1969 Australian federal election: Phillip
Party	Candidate	Votes	%	±%
Labor	Joe Riordan	23,121	43.9	−0.2
Liberal	William Aston	22,865	43.4	−5.8
Democratic Labor	Lyle Antcliff	2,301	4.4	+1.2
Pensioner Power	William Whitby	1,815	3.4	+3.4
Independent	Totti Cohen	1,254	2.4	+2.4
Australia	Jack Gray	590	1.1	+1.1
Independent	Ronald Rigby	327	0.6	+0.6
Independent	Ken Yeomans	238	0.5	+0.5
Independent	Alex MacDonald	129	0.3	+0.3
Total formal votes		52,640	95.8	
Informal votes		2,287	4.2	
Turnout		54,927	91.9	
Two-party-preferred result
Liberal	William Aston	26,540	50.4	−3.1
Labor	Joe Riordan	26,100	49.6	+3.1
Liberal hold		Swing	−3.1	

=== Prospect ===
This section is an excerpt from Electoral results for the Division of Prospect § 1969

1969 Australian federal election: Prospect
Party	Candidate	Votes	%	±%
Labor	Dick Klugman	28,155	57.0	+6.2
Liberal	Stanislaus Kelly	16,687	33.8	−6.2
Democratic Labor	John Ferguson	4,517	9.2	+3.9
Total formal votes		49,359	96.6	
Informal votes		1,758	3.4	
Turnout		51,117	94.3	
Two-party-preferred result
Labor	Dick Klugman		58.6	+5.3
Liberal	Stanislaus Kelly		41.4	−5.3
Labor notional hold		Swing	+5.3	

=== Reid ===
This section is an excerpt from Electoral results for the Division of Reid § 1969

1969 Australian federal election: Reid
Party	Candidate	Votes	%	±%
Labor	Tom Uren	31,189	59.3	+4.8
Liberal	Stanley Hedges	17,404	33.1	−2.0
Democratic Labor	Mick Carroll	2,791	5.3	−5.1
Independent	Norman Hurst	1,242	2.4	+2.4
Total formal votes		52,626	97.3	
Informal votes		1,454	2.7	
Turnout		54,080	94.9	
Two-party-preferred result
Labor	Tom Uren		61.4	+5.0
Liberal	Stanley Hedges		38.6	−5.0
Labor hold		Swing	+5.0	

=== Richmond ===
This section is an excerpt from Electoral results for the Division of Richmond § 1969

1969 Australian federal election: Richmond
Party	Candidate	Votes	%	±%
Country	Doug Anthony	29,600	62.6	−3.3
Labor	Joseph Gilmore	17,699	37.4	+24.6
Total formal votes		47,299	99.2	
Informal votes		374	0.8	
Turnout		47,673	95.8	
Country hold		Swing	−4.6	

=== Riverina ===
This section is an excerpt from Electoral results for the Division of Riverina § 1969

1969 Australian federal election: Riverina
Party	Candidate	Votes	%	±%
Labor	Al Grassby	22,499	51.5	+18.7
Country	Bill Armstrong	19,351	44.3	−14.8
Democratic Labor	Patrick Barry	1,802	4.1	−4.0
Total formal votes		43,652	98.9	
Informal votes		485	1.1	
Turnout		44,137	95.1	
Two-party-preferred result
Labor	Al Grassby		52.3	+18.8
Country	Bill Armstrong		47.7	−18.8
Labor gain from Country		Swing	+18.8	

=== Robertson ===
This section is an excerpt from Electoral results for the Division of Robertson § 1969

1969 Australian federal election: Robertson
Party	Candidate	Votes	%	±%
Labor	Barry Cohen	25,369	50.2	+11.8
Liberal	William Bridges-Maxwell	23,492	46.5	−6.6
Independent	Albert Date	924	1.8	+1.8
Independent	Wallace Cook	729	1.4	+1.4
Total formal votes		50,514	98.7	
Informal votes		688	1.3	
Turnout		51,202	95.8	
Two-party-preferred result
Labor	Barry Cohen		51.8	+9.7
Liberal	William Bridges-Maxwell		48.2	−9.7
Labor gain from Liberal		Swing	+9.7	

=== Shortland ===
This section is an excerpt from Electoral results for the Division of Shortland § 1969

1969 Australian federal election: Shortland
Party	Candidate	Votes	%	±%
Labor	Charles Griffiths	29,371	60.0	+5.9
Liberal	Paul Clarkson	14,909	30.5	−7.5
Democratic Labor	Robert Burke	2,502	5.1	+0.5
Australia	Charles Hockings	1,149	2.3	+2.3
Communist	Geoff Curthoys	991	2.0	−0.8
Total formal votes		48,922	97.9	
Informal votes		1,052	2.1	
Turnout		49,974	96.2	
Two-party-preferred result
Labor	Charles Griffiths		64.0	+5.3
Liberal	Paul Clarkson		36.0	−5.3
Labor hold		Swing	+5.3	

=== St George ===
This section is an excerpt from Electoral results for the Division of St George § 1969

1969 Australian federal election: St George
Party	Candidate	Votes	%	±%
Labor	Bill Morrison	25,918	48.2	+10.2
Liberal	Len Bosman	24,822	46.2	−8.3
Democratic Labor	Henry Bader	1,805	3.4	−0.8
Australia	Christopher Owens	741	1.4	+1.4
Independent	Archibald Lawless	249	0.5	+0.5
Independent	Emanuel Said	198	0.4	+0.4
Total formal votes		53,733	96.7	
Informal votes		1,838	3.3	
Turnout		55,571	95.4	
Two-party-preferred result
Labor	Bill Morrison	26,901	50.1	+9.6
Liberal	Len Bosman	26,832	49.9	−9.6
Labor gain from Liberal		Swing	+9.6	

=== Sydney ===
This section is an excerpt from Electoral results for the Division of Sydney § 1969

1969 Australian federal election: Sydney
Party	Candidate	Votes	%	±%
Labor	Jim Cope	31,822	65.1	+0.1
Liberal	Graham Robertson	9,805	20.1	−6.5
Independent	Nick Origlass	3,362	6.9	+6.9
Democratic Labor	Norma Boyle	2,381	4.9	−1.2
Pensioner Power	Donald Lewis	623	1.3	+1.3
Independent	Ian Channell	571	1.2	+1.2
Independent	Shane Watson	316	0.6	+0.6
Total formal votes		48,880	94.6	
Informal votes		2,773	5.4	
Turnout		51,653	89.1	
Two-party-preferred result
Labor	Jim Cope		73.6	+6.8
Liberal	Graham Robertson		26.4	−6.8
Labor notional hold		Swing	+6.8	

=== Warringah ===
This section is an excerpt from Electoral results for the Division of Warringah § 1969

1969 Australian federal election: Warringah
Party	Candidate	Votes	%	±%
Liberal	Michael MacKellar	25,799	50.2	−8.6
Labor	Thomas Reynolds	11,884	23.1	+2.5
Independent	Edward St John	10,589	20.6	+20.6
Democratic Labor	Peter Keogh	2,135	4.2	−0.4
Pensioner Power	Albert Thompson	775	1.5	+1.5
Independent	Eric Riches	163	0.3	+0.3
Total formal votes		51,345	97.8	
Informal votes		1,140	2.2	
Turnout		52,485	92.9	
Two-party-preferred result
Liberal	Michael MacKellar		70.1	−5.7
Labor	Thomas Reynolds		29.9	+5.7
Liberal hold		Swing	−5.7	

=== Wentworth ===
This section is an excerpt from Electoral results for the Division of Wentworth § 1969

1969 Australian federal election: Wentworth
Party	Candidate	Votes	%	±%
Liberal	Les Bury	28,935	57.6	−6.4
Labor	Frederick Cross	17,151	34.2	+4.8
Democratic Labor	Doris Brown	1,820	3.6	−0.6
Independent	Geoff Mullen	1,345	2.7	+2.7
Pensioner Power	Neville Yeomans	951	1.9	+1.9
Total formal votes		50,202	96.9	
Informal votes		1,598	3.1	
Turnout		51,800	90.5	
Two-party-preferred result
Liberal	Les Bury		63.5	−4.9
Labor	Frederick Cross		36.5	+4.9
Liberal hold		Swing	−4.9	

=== Werriwa ===
This section is an excerpt from Electoral results for the Division of Werriwa § 1969

1969 Australian federal election: Werriwa
Party	Candidate	Votes	%	±%
Labor	Gough Whitlam	32,435	61.2	+8.1
Liberal	Christopher May	15,416	29.1	−9.4
Democratic Labor	William Arundel	2,680	5.1	+2.0
Independent	Fay McCallum	1,088	2.1	+2.1
Independent	William Sadler	1,021	1.9	+1.9
Communist	Don Syme	377	0.7	+0.7
Total formal votes		53,017	95.6	
Informal votes		2,427	4.4	
Turnout		55,444	94.2	
Two-party-preferred result
Labor	Gough Whitlam		64.7	+7.1
Liberal	Christopher May		35.3	−7.1
Labor hold		Swing	+7.1	

== Victoria ==
1969 Australian federal election (Victoria)
- 25 October 1969

All 34 Victorian seats in the House of Representatives 17 seats needed for a majority
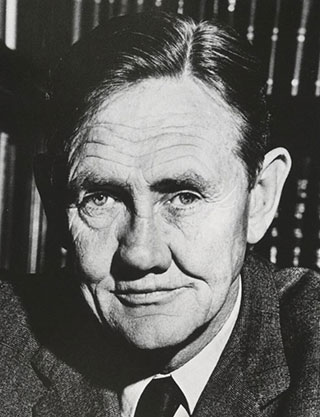

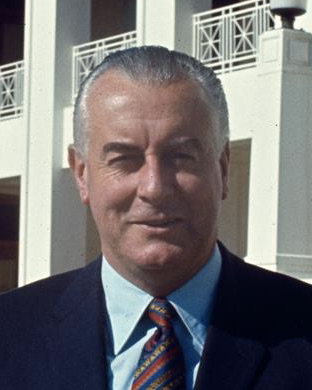
	First party	Second party
Leader	John Gorton	Gough Whitlam
Party	Coalition	Labor
Seats before	24	8
Seats won	23	11
Seat change	▼1	▲3
Popular vote	740,432	689,515
Percentage	44.1%	41.3%
Swing	▼3.7pp	▲6.2pp
TPP	55.1%	44.9%
TPP swing	▼5.6pp	▲5.6pp

=== Balaclava ===
This section is an excerpt from Electoral results for the Division of Balaclava § 1969

1969 Australian federal election: Balaclava
Party	Candidate	Votes	%	±%
Liberal	Ray Whittorn	26,852	51.7	−3.8
Labor	Irene Dunsmuir	18,949	36.5	+13.3
Democratic Labor	Ralph James	4,751	9.1	−5.1
Australia	Steven Soos	1,398	2.7	+2.7
Total formal votes		51,950	97.1	
Informal votes		1,571	2.9	
Turnout		53,521	94.4	
Two-party-preferred result
Liberal	Ray Whittorn		60.9	−8.3
Labor	Irene Dunsmuir		39.1	+8.3
Liberal hold		Swing	−8.3	

=== Ballarat ===
This section is an excerpt from Electoral results for the Division of Ballarat § 1969

1969 Australian federal election: Ballaarat
Party	Candidate	Votes	%	±%
Liberal	Dudley Erwin	20,881	44.0	−4.6
Labor	David Pollock	18,634	39.3	+3.6
Democratic Labor	Bob Joshua	6,444	13.6	−2.0
Independent	Graeme Bond	1,173	2.5	+2.5
Independent	David Swinnerton	215	0.5	+0.5
Independent	Hendrik Prins	92	0.2	+0.2
Total formal votes		47,439	96.4	
Informal votes		1,752	3.6	
Turnout		49,191	96.6	
Two-party-preferred result
Liberal	Dudley Erwin	27,999	59.0	−4.0
Labor	David Pollock	19,440	41.0	+4.0
Liberal hold		Swing	−4.0	

=== Batman ===
This section is an excerpt from Electoral results for the Division of Batman § 1969

1969 Australian federal election: Batman
Party	Candidate	Votes	%	±%
Labor	Horrie Garrick	24,686	46.5	+5.5
Liberal	Peter McGrath	17,567	33.1	+6.2
Democratic Labor	Henry Darroch	7,776	14.7	−2.0
Independent	Ronald Hayles	3,005	5.7	+5.7
Total formal votes		53,034	95.5	
Informal votes		2,497	4.5	
Turnout		55,531	94.5	
Two-party-preferred result
Labor	Horrie Garrick	28,117	53.0	+0.2
Liberal	Peter McGrath	24,917	47.0	−0.2
Labor gain from Independent		Swing	+0.2	

=== Bendigo ===
This section is an excerpt from Electoral results for the Division of Bendigo § 1969

1969 Australian federal election: Bendigo
Party	Candidate	Votes	%	±%
Labor	David Kennedy	24,792	50.8	+0.0
Liberal	Mervyn Lee	17,897	36.7	+0.0
Democratic Labor	Paul Brennan	6,102	12.5	+0.1
Total formal votes		48,791	98.7	
Informal votes		622	1.3	
Turnout		49,413	96.9	
Two-party-preferred result
Labor	David Kennedy		53.0	+0.9
Liberal	Mervyn Lee		47.0	−0.9
Labor hold		Swing	+0.9	

=== Bruce ===
This section is an excerpt from Electoral results for the Division of Bruce § 1969

1969 Australian federal election: Bruce
Party	Candidate	Votes	%	±%
Liberal	Billy Snedden	25,470	49.7	−7.8
Labor	Leon Phillips	18,449	36.0	+11.2
Democratic Labor	William Hoyne	5,308	10.4	−1.6
Australia	Douglas McKay	990	1.9	+1.9
Independent	Herbert Wessley	669	1.3	+1.3
Communist	Les Smith	366	0.7	−0.6
Total formal votes		51,252	96.8	
Informal votes		1,681	3.2	
Turnout		52,933	96.2	
Two-party-preferred result
Liberal	Billy Snedden		59.9	−7.7
Labor	Leon Phillips		40.1	+7.7
Liberal hold		Swing	−7.7	

=== Burke ===
This section is an excerpt from Electoral results for the Division of Burke (1969–2004) § 1969

1969 Australian federal election: Burke
Party	Candidate	Votes	%	±%
Labor	Keith Johnson	26,798	56.8	+10.4
Liberal	John Williams	14,230	30.2	−0.9
Democratic Labor	Terence Scully	5,003	10.6	−3.3
Independent	Kathleen Laherty	633	1.3	+1.3
Australia	Richard Smith	506	1.1	+1.1
Total formal votes		47,170	94.7	
Informal votes		2,621	5.3	
Turnout		49,791	96.2	
Two-party-preferred result
Labor	Keith Johnson		59.2	+7.2
Liberal	John Williams		40.8	−7.2
Labor notional hold		Swing	+7.2	

=== Casey ===
This section is an excerpt from Electoral results for the Division of Casey § 1969

1969 Australian federal election: Casey
Party	Candidate	Votes	%	±%
Liberal	Peter Howson	21,517	43.2	−5.8
Labor	Duncan Waterson	20,420	41.0	+8.1
Democratic Labor	Kevin Adamson	5,656	11.4	−0.3
Australia	Leonard Weber	1,852	3.7	+3.7
Independent	Joe Schillani	320	0.6	+0.6
Total formal votes		49,765	97.2	
Informal votes		1,442	2.8	
Turnout		51,207	95.2	
Two-party-preferred result
Liberal	Peter Howson	27,390	55.0	−7.8
Labor	Duncan Waterson	22,375	45.0	+7.8
Liberal notional hold		Swing	−7.8	

=== Chisholm ===
This section is an excerpt from Electoral results for the Division of Chisholm § 1969

1969 Australian federal election: Chisholm
Party	Candidate	Votes	%	±%
Liberal	Sir Wilfrid Kent Hughes	27,783	52.9	−5.9
Labor	Anthony Dwyer	17,912	34.1	+7.5
Democratic Labor	John Rogers	4,747	9.0	+0.0
Australia	Andrew Morrow	2,053	3.9	+3.9
Total formal votes		52,495	97.9	
Informal votes		1,115	2.1	
Turnout		53,610	94.8	
Two-party-preferred result
Liberal	Sir Wilfrid Kent Hughes		62.6	−7.9
Labor	Anthony Dwyer		37.4	+7.9
Liberal hold		Swing	−7.9	

=== Corangamite ===
This section is an excerpt from Electoral results for the Division of Corangamite § 1969

1969 Australian federal election: Corangamite
Party	Candidate	Votes	%	±%
Liberal	Tony Street	25,900	55.6	+6.6
Labor	Neil Moorfoot	15,447	33.2	+7.4
Democratic Labor	Francis O'Brien	5,216	11.2	−0.8
Total formal votes		46,563	98.4	
Informal votes		770	1.6	
Turnout		47,333	97.2	
Two-party-preferred result
Liberal	Tony Street		64.6	−9.0
Labor	Neil Moorfoot		35.4	+9.0
Liberal hold		Swing	−9.0	

=== Corio ===
This section is an excerpt from Electoral results for the Division of Corio § 1969

1969 Australian federal election: Corio
Party	Candidate	Votes	%	±%
Labor	Gordon Scholes	24,917	50.5	+8.1
Liberal	Charles Malpas	16,989	34.4	−9.4
Democratic Labor	John Timberlake	4,680	9.5	−1.4
Independent	Stuart Harris	1,773	3.6	+3.6
Independent	Elsie Brushfield	1,013	2.1	+2.1
Total formal votes		49,372	96.8	
Informal votes		1,623	3.2	
Turnout		50,995	96.0	
Two-party-preferred result
Labor	Gordon Scholes		53.8	+10.0
Liberal	Charles Malpas		46.2	−10.0
Labor hold		Swing	+10.0	

=== Deakin ===
This section is an excerpt from Electoral results for the Division of Deakin § 1969

1969 Australian federal election: Deakin
Party	Candidate	Votes	%	±%
Liberal	Alan Jarman	23,592	47.0	−6.0
Labor	Bernard Mildner	18,095	36.0	+4.4
Democratic Labor	Maurice Weston	4,862	9.7	−1.7
Independent	Ray Nilsen	3,658	7.3	+7.3
Total formal votes		50,207	97.8	
Informal votes		1,128	2.2	
Turnout		51,335	96.0	
Two-party-preferred result
Liberal	Alan Jarman	28,990	57.7	−8.6
Labor	Bernard Mildner	21,217	42.3	+8.6
Liberal hold		Swing	−8.6	

=== Diamond Valley ===
This section is an excerpt from Electoral results for the Division of Diamond Valley § 1969

1969 Australian federal election: Diamond Valley
Party	Candidate	Votes	%	±%
Liberal	Neil Brown	24,403	45.7	−2.2
Labor	David McKenzie	22,021	41.3	+8.0
Democratic Labor	Leo Morison	5,596	10.5	−1.2
Australia	John Hill	1,354	2.5	+2.5
Total formal votes		53,374	97.4	
Informal votes		1,443	2.6	
Turnout		54,817	96.3	
Two-party-preferred result
Liberal	Neil Brown	29,927	56.1	−6.0
Labor	David McKenzie	23,447	43.9	+6.0
Liberal notional hold		Swing	−6.0	

=== Flinders ===
This section is an excerpt from Electoral results for the Division of Flinders § 1969

1969 Australian federal election: Flinders
Party	Candidate	Votes	%	±%
Liberal	Phillip Lynch	27,179	55.1	+3.3
Labor	Fay Nottage	16,820	34.1	−1.6
Democratic Labor	Josephus Gobel	3,480	7.1	−2.6
Independent	Monty Hollow	1,880	3.8	+3.8
Total formal votes		49,359	97.9	
Informal votes		1,059	2.1	
Turnout		50,418	94.8	
Two-party-preferred result
Liberal	Phillip Lynch		63.5	+1.5
Labor	Fay Nottage		36.5	−1.5
Liberal hold		Swing	+1.5	

=== Gellibrand ===
This section is an excerpt from Electoral results for the Division of Gellibrand § 1969

1969 Australian federal election: Gellibrand
Party	Candidate	Votes	%	±%
Labor	Hector McIvor	31,458	62.3	+8.0
Liberal	Ian Crouch	12,245	24.2	−1.2
Democratic Labor	Robin Thomas	6,798	13.5	+1.2
Total formal votes		50,501	94.7	
Informal votes		2,849	5.3	
Turnout		53,350	95.4	
Two-party-preferred result
Labor	Hector McIvor		63.7	+1.9
Liberal	Ian Crouch		36.3	−1.9
Labor hold		Swing	+1.9	

=== Gippsland ===
This section is an excerpt from Electoral results for the Division of Gippsland § 1969

1969 Australian federal election: Gippsland
Party	Candidate	Votes	%	±%
Country	Peter Nixon	27,068	58.8	−5.3
Labor	John Wolfe	13,457	29.3	+7.8
Democratic Labor	John Hansen	5,478	11.9	−2.6
Total formal votes		46,003	98.0	
Informal votes		917	2.0	
Turnout		46,920	96.0	
Two-party-preferred result
Country	Peter Nixon		69.6	−7.7
Labor	John Wolfe		30.4	+7.7
Country hold		Swing	−7.7	

=== Henty ===
This section is an excerpt from Electoral results for the Division of Henty § 1969

1969 Australian federal election: Henty
Party	Candidate	Votes	%	±%
Liberal	Max Fox	24,353	46.6	−4.9
Labor	Robert Ray	18,670	35.7	−1.7
Democratic Labor	John Launder	5,050	9.7	−1.4
Independent	Herman Crowther	4,172	8.0	+8.0
Total formal votes		52,245	97.3	
Informal votes		1,440	2.7	
Turnout		53,685	95.0	
Two-party-preferred result
Liberal	Max Fox		59.4	−2.3
Labor	Robert Ray		40.6	+2.3
Liberal hold		Swing	−2.3	

=== Higgins ===
This section is an excerpt from Electoral results for the Division of Higgins § 1969

1969 Australian federal election: Higgins
Party	Candidate	Votes	%	±%
Liberal	John Gorton	30,191	58.5	−3.3
Labor	Wilhelm Kapphan	14,868	28.8	+2.1
Democratic Labor	Peter Grant	4,208	8.1	−3.5
Australia	Walter Pickering	1,598	3.1	+3.1
Independent	Morris Revelman	777	1.5	+1.5
Total formal votes		51,642	96.8	
Informal votes		1,715	3.2	
Turnout		53,357	91.3	
Two-party-preferred result
Liberal	John Gorton		67.8	−4.4
Labor	Wilhelm Kapphan		32.2	+4.4
Liberal hold		Swing	−4.4	

=== Holt ===
This section is an excerpt from Electoral results for the Division of Holt § 1969

1969 Australian federal election: Holt
Party	Candidate	Votes	%	±%
Labor	William Wilkinson	22,749	45.2	+12.2
Liberal	Len Reid	21,313	42.4	−8.2
Democratic Labor	Henri de Sachau	6,244	12.4	+0.4
Total formal votes		50,306	96.6	
Informal votes		1,794	3.4	
Turnout		52,100	95.9	
Two-party-preferred result
Liberal	Len Reid	26,938	53.5	−10.1
Labor	William Wilkinson	23,368	46.5	+10.1
Liberal notional hold		Swing	−10.1	

=== Hotham ===
This section is an excerpt from Electoral results for the Division of Hotham § 1969

1969 Australian federal election: Hotham
Party	Candidate	Votes	%	±%
Liberal	Don Chipp	23,776	48.2	−0.2
Labor	Kevin Vaughan	19,717	40.0	+5.5
Democratic Labor	Ian Radnell	4,563	9.3	−0.5
Australia	Kenneth Nolan	1,238	2.5	+2.5
Total formal votes		49,294	97.3	
Informal votes		1,379	2.7	
Turnout		50,673	96.3	
Two-party-preferred result
Liberal	Don Chipp	28,667	58.2	−2.6
Labor	Keith Vaughan	20,627	41.8	+2.6
Liberal notional hold		Swing	−2.6	

=== Indi ===
This section is an excerpt from Electoral results for the Division of Indi § 1969

1969 Australian federal election: Indi
Party	Candidate	Votes	%	±%
Country	Mac Holten	20,730	47.0	−3.2
Labor	Robert Cross	12,590	28.5	+6.9
Democratic Labor	Christopher Cody	5,411	12.3	−0.7
Liberal	Roy Harle	5,382	12.2	−3.2
Total formal votes		44,113	97.2	
Informal votes		1,275	2.8	
Turnout		45,388	96.4	
Two-party-preferred result
Country	Mac Holten		68.7	−7.0
Labor	Robert Cross		31.3	+7.0
Country hold		Swing	−7.0	

=== Isaacs ===
This section is an excerpt from Electoral results for the Division of Isaacs § 1969

1969 Australian federal election: Isaacs
Party	Candidate	Votes	%	±%
Liberal	David Hamer	23,525	47.7	−1.4
Labor	Alan Roberts	19,751	40.1	+4.2
Democratic Labor	Frederick Skinner	4,967	10.1	−0.4
Independent	Liane Wessley	1,026	2.1	+2.1
Total formal votes		49,269	97.8	
Informal votes		1,129	2.2	
Turnout		50,398	95.3	
Two-party-preferred result
Liberal	David Hamer	28,562	58.0	−3.2
Labor	Alan Roberts	20,707	42.0	+3.2
Liberal notional hold		Swing	−3.2	

=== Kooyong ===
This section is an excerpt from Electoral results for the Division of Kooyong § 1969

1969 Australian federal election: Kooyong
Party	Candidate	Votes	%	±%
Liberal	Andrew Peacock	29,076	54.3	−4.0
Labor	Richard Dunstan	17,591	32.9	+3.7
Democratic Labor	Francis Duffy	6,856	12.8	+0.3
Total formal votes		53,523	97.8	
Informal votes		1,185	2.2	
Turnout		54,708	93.6	
Two-party-preferred result
Liberal	Andrew Peacock		64.9	−4.7
Labor	Richard Dunstan		35.1	+4.7
Liberal hold		Swing	−4.7	

=== La Trobe ===
This section is an excerpt from Electoral results for the Division of La Trobe § 1969

1969 Australian federal election: La Trobe
Party	Candidate	Votes	%	±%
Liberal	John Jess	22,343	44.6	−3.2
Labor	Pauline McCarthy	20,898	41.7	+9.6
Democratic Labor	Peter Tunstall	4,393	8.8	−4.0
Australia	Brenda Elliott	2,484	5.0	+5.0
Total formal votes		50,118	96.8	
Informal votes		1,658	3.2	
Turnout		51,776	94.9	
Two-party-preferred result
Liberal	John Jess	27,641	55.2	−5.7
Labor	Pauline McCarthy	22,477	44.8	+5.7
Liberal hold		Swing	−5.7	

=== Lalor ===
This section is an excerpt from Electoral results for the Division of Lalor § 1969

1969 Australian federal election: Lalor
Party	Candidate	Votes	%	±%
Labor	Jim Cairns	26,807	56.9	+3.9
Liberal	Vaclav Ubl	11,631	24.7	+1.7
Democratic Labor	John Bacon	7,227	15.3	+1.3
Independent	Tom Gilhooley	1,447	3.1	+3.1
Total formal votes		47,112	94.1	
Informal votes		2,959	5.9	
Turnout		50,071	94.2	
Two-party-preferred result
Labor	Jim Cairns		60.9	+4.8
Liberal	Vaclav Ubl		39.1	−4.8
Labor gain from Liberal		Swing	+4.8	

=== Mallee ===
This section is an excerpt from Electoral results for the Division of Mallee § 1969

1969 Australian federal election: Mallee
Party	Candidate	Votes	%	±%
Country	Winton Turnbull	19,914	46.7	−21.5
Labor	Ronald Davies	13,420	31.5	+15.2
Liberal	James McFarlane	5,543	13.0	+13.0
Democratic Labor	Peter Lawrence	3,791	8.9	−6.6
Total formal votes		42,668	97.3	
Informal votes		1,198	2.7	
Turnout		43,866	96.5	
Two-party-preferred result
Country	Winton Turnbull		66.1	−15.2
Labor	Ronald Davies		33.9	+15.2
Country hold		Swing	−15.2	

=== Maribyrnong ===
This section is an excerpt from Electoral results for the Division of Maribyrnong § 1969

1969 Australian federal election: Maribyrnong
Party	Candidate	Votes	%	±%
Labor	Moss Cass	23,191	46.2	+10.3
Liberal	Philip Stokes	17,835	35.5	−5.9
Democratic Labor	Jim Marmion	6,246	12.4	−3.8
Independent	Lance Hutchinson	2,626	5.2	−1.3
Independent	Daphne Thorne	343	0.7	+0.7
Total formal votes		50,241	95.4	
Informal votes		2,414	4.6	
Turnout		52,655	95.5	
Two-party-preferred result
Labor	Moss Cass		51.4	+8.0
Liberal	Philip Stokes		48.6	−8.0
Labor gain from Liberal		Swing	+8.0	

=== McMillan ===
This section is an excerpt from Electoral results for the Division of McMillan § 1969

1969 Australian federal election: McMillan
Party	Candidate	Votes	%	±%
Labor	Frank Mountford	20,390	42.1	+8.2
Liberal	Alex Buchanan	15,530	32.1	−18.5
Country	John Dwyer	8,164	16.9	+16.9
Democratic Labor	Les Hilton	4,337	9.0	−2.1
Total formal votes		48,421	97.6	
Informal votes		1,189	2.4	
Turnout		49,610	96.0	
Two-party-preferred result
Liberal	Alex Buchanan	26,795	55.3	−7.5
Labor	Frank Mountford	21,626	44.7	+7.5
Liberal hold		Swing	−7.5	

=== Melbourne ===
This section is an excerpt from Electoral results for the Division of Melbourne § 1969

1969 Australian federal election: Melbourne
Party	Candidate	Votes	%	±%
Labor	Arthur Calwell	25,381	53.1	−2.5
Liberal	Peter Block	14,686	30.7	+5.6
Democratic Labor	John Ryan	5,374	11.2	−2.2
Independent	Murray Thompson	2,400	5.0	+5.0
Total formal votes		47,841	93.3	
Informal votes		3,449	6.7	
Turnout		51,290	91.1	
Two-party-preferred result
Labor	Arthur Calwell		56.7	−3.6
Liberal	Peter Block		43.3	+3.6
Labor hold		Swing	−3.6	

=== Melbourne Ports ===
This section is an excerpt from Electoral results for the Division of Melbourne Ports § 1969

1969 Australian federal election: Melbourne Ports
Party	Candidate	Votes	%	±%
Labor	Frank Crean	25,209	52.0	+12.3
Liberal	Kevin Randall	15,923	32.9	−7.6
Democratic Labor	Eustace Tracey	3,944	8.1	−3.4
Independent	Reg Macey	1,580	3.3	+3.3
Independent	Stephen Graves	1,447	3.0	+3.0
Independent	George Gabriel	352	0.7	+0.7
Total formal votes		48,455	94.6	
Informal votes		2,745	5.4	
Turnout		51,200	91.4	
Two-party-preferred result
Labor	Frank Crean		56.3	+8.0
Liberal	Kevin Randall		43.7	−8.0
Labor gain from Liberal		Swing	+8.0	

=== Murray ===
This section is an excerpt from Electoral results for the Division of Murray § 1969

1969 Australian federal election: Murray
Party	Candidate	Votes	%	±%
Country	John McEwen	24,450	53.3	−12.7
Labor	Neil Frankland	10,634	23.2	+1.6
Independent	Bill Hunter	6,426	14.0	+14.0
Democratic Labor	Brian Lacey	4,405	9.6	−3.0
Total formal votes		45,915	97.0	
Informal votes		1,427	3.0	
Turnout		47,342	96.9	
Two-party-preferred result
Country	John McEwen		74.5	−2.8
Labor	Neil Frankland		25.5	+2.8
Country hold		Swing	−2.8	

=== Scullin ===
This section is an excerpt from Electoral results for the Division of Scullin § 1969

1969 Australian federal election: Scullin
Party	Candidate	Votes	%	±%
Labor	Harry Jenkins	25,246	52.2	+3.2
Liberal	James Spicer	13,090	27.1	−4.3
Democratic Labor	Tom Andrews	7,065	14.6	−4.8
Independent	Brendon Connor	2,958	6.1	+6.1
Total formal votes		48,359	95.8	
Informal votes		2,142	4.2	
Turnout		50,501	95.8	
Two-party-preferred result
Labor	Harry Jenkins		57.6	+6.6
Liberal	James Spicer		42.4	−6.6
Labor notional hold		Swing	+6.6	

=== Wannon ===
This section is an excerpt from Electoral results for the Division of Wannon § 1969

1969 Australian federal election: Wannon
Party	Candidate	Votes	%	±%
Liberal	Malcolm Fraser	23,711	51.3	−2.5
Labor	Kenneth Ginifer	17,175	37.1	+5.9
Democratic Labor	Maurice Purcell	5,355	11.6	−3.4
Total formal votes		46,241	98.9	
Informal votes		496	1.1	
Turnout		46,737	97.3	
Two-party-preferred result
Liberal	Malcolm Fraser		61.7	−5.7
Labor	Kenneth Ginifer		38.3	+5.7
Liberal hold		Swing	−5.7	

=== Wills ===
This section is an excerpt from Electoral results for the Division of Wills § 1969

1969 Australian federal election: Wills
Party	Candidate	Votes	%	±%
Labor	Gordon Bryant	25,839	50.9	−0.7
Liberal	Peter Frankel	15,046	29.6	−3.5
Democratic Labor	John Flint	6,021	11.9	−3.3
Independent	John Bennett	3,367	6.6	+6.6
Independent	Milan Breier	280	0.6	+0.6
Independent	Geraldine Phelan	251	0.5	+0.5
Total formal votes		50,804	93.9	
Informal votes		3,325	6.1	
Turnout		54,129	95.5	
Two-party-preferred result
Labor	Gordon Bryant		56.4	+3.3
Liberal	Peter Frankel		43.6	−3.3
Labor hold		Swing	+3.3	

=== Wimmera ===
This section is an excerpt from Electoral results for the Division of Wimmera § 1969

1969 Australian federal election: Wimmera
Party	Candidate	Votes	%	±%
Labor	Brian Brooke	16,534	37.5	+9.8
Country	Robert King	13,632	31.0	−4.6
Liberal	Miles Bourke	11,015	25.0	−2.9
Democratic Labor	Brian Cronin	2,851	6.5	−2.2
Total formal votes		44,032	98.4	
Informal votes		715	1.6	
Turnout		44,747	97.4	
Two-party-preferred result
Country	Robert King	25,531	58.0	+7.5
Labor	Brian Brooke	18,501	42.0	+42.0
Country hold		Swing	+7.5	

== Queensland ==
1969 Australian federal election (Queensland)
- 25 October 1969

All 18 Queensland seats in the House of Representatives 9 seats needed for a majority
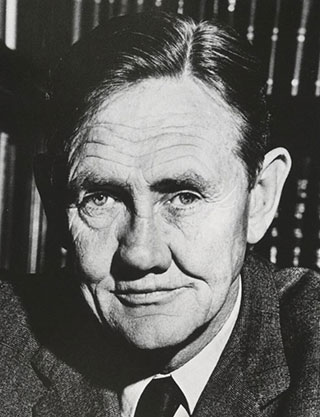

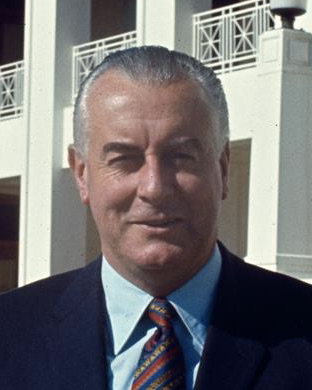
	First party	Second party
Leader	John Gorton	Gough Whitlam
Party	Coalition	Labor
Seats before	12	6
Seats won	11	7
Seat change	▼1	▲1
Popular vote	397,200	430,403
Percentage	44.5%	48.2%
Swing	▼5.2pp	▲6.1pp
TPP	50.1%	49.9%
TPP swing	▼5.6pp	▲5.6pp

=== Bowman ===
This section is an excerpt from Electoral results for the Division of Bowman § 1969

1969 Australian federal election: Bowman
Party	Candidate	Votes	%	±%
Labor	Len Keogh	28,143	51.1	+7.1
Liberal	Wylie Gibbs	23,167	42.1	−7.1
Democratic Labor	Noel Tennison	2,713	4.9	−1.9
Independent	Harold Asmith	1,002	1.8	+1.8
Total formal votes		55,025	98.6	
Informal votes		784	1.4	
Turnout		55,809	95.4	
Two-party-preferred result
Labor	Len Keogh		52.5	+7.1
Liberal	Wylie Gibbs		47.5	−7.1
Labor gain from Liberal		Swing	+7.1	

=== Brisbane ===
This section is an excerpt from Electoral results for the Division of Brisbane § 1969

1969 Australian federal election: Brisbane
Party	Candidate	Votes	%	±%
Labor	Manfred Cross	28,764	52.2	+7.6
Liberal	Greg O'Dwyer	21,751	39.5	−6.9
Democratic Labor	Roger Judge	4,591	8.3	−0.6
Total formal votes		55,106	98.1	
Informal votes		1,083	1.9	
Turnout		56,189	93.9	
Two-party-preferred result
Labor	Manfred Cross		53.9	+7.0
Liberal	Gregory O'Dwyer		46.1	−7.0
Labor gain from Liberal		Swing	+2.1	

=== Capricornia ===
This section is an excerpt from Electoral results for the Division of Capricornia § 1969

1969 Australian federal election: Capricornia
Party	Candidate	Votes	%	±%
Labor	Doug Everingham	28,188	62.4	+13.4
Liberal	Brian Palmer	14,049	31.1	−10.6
Democratic Labor	Alfred Rose	2,950	6.5	−2.8
Total formal votes		45,187	99.1	
Informal votes		413	0.9	
Turnout		45,600	96.3	
Two-party-preferred result
Labor	Doug Everingham		63.7	+12.0
Liberal	Brian Palmer		36.3	−12.0
Labor hold		Swing	+12.0	

=== Darling Downs ===
This section is an excerpt from Electoral results for the Division of Darling Downs § 1969

1969 Australian federal election: Darling Downs
Party	Candidate	Votes	%	±%
Liberal	Reginald Swartz	29,715	57.5	−2.3
Labor	Eugene Salas	16,785	32.5	+1.3
Democratic Labor	Francis Mullins	5,177	10.0	+1.0
Total formal votes		51,677	99.1	
Informal votes		480	0.9	
Turnout		52,157	95.9	
Two-party-preferred result
Liberal	Reginald Swartz		64.7	−3.7
Labor	Eugene Salas		35.3	+3.7
Liberal hold		Swing	−3.7	

=== Dawson ===
This section is an excerpt from Electoral results for the Division of Dawson § 1969

1969 Australian federal election: Dawson
Party	Candidate	Votes	%	±%
Labor	Rex Patterson	28,966	63.1	+8.3
Country	John Hinz	14,646	31.9	−10.0
Democratic Labor	Bernard Lewis	2,280	5.0	+1.7
Total formal votes		45,892	99.0	
Informal votes		473	1.0	
Turnout		46,365	95.8	
Two-party-preferred result
Labor	Rex Patterson		64.1	+8.6
Country	John Hinz		35.9	−8.6
Labor hold		Swing	+8.6	

=== Fisher ===
This section is an excerpt from Electoral results for the Division of Fisher § 1969

1969 Australian federal election: Fisher
Party	Candidate	Votes	%	±%
Country	Charles Adermann	30,581	58.9	−2.4
Labor	Ian Budge	18,509	35.6	+3.1
Democratic Labor	Robert Barron	2,854	5.5	−0.7
Total formal votes		51,944	98.9	
Informal votes		564	1.1	
Turnout		52,508	96.3	
Two-party-preferred result
Country	Charles Adermann		63.3	−3.0
Labor	Ian Budge		36.7	+3.0
Country hold		Swing	−3.0	

=== Griffith ===
This section is an excerpt from Electoral results for the Division of Griffith § 1969

1969 Australian federal election: Griffith
Party	Candidate	Votes	%	±%
Labor	Barry Gorman	25,416	46.8	+4.6
Liberal	Don Cameron	23,907	44.0	−5.7
Democratic Labor	Cecil Birchley	4,314	7.9	+1.0
Independent	Trevor Sturling	699	1.3	+1.3
Total formal votes		54,336	98.3	
Informal votes		913	1.7	
Turnout		55,249	93.9	
Two-party-preferred result
Liberal	Don Cameron	27,970	51.5	−4.3
Labor	Barry Gorman	26,366	48.5	+4.3
Liberal hold		Swing	−4.3	

=== Herbert ===
This section is an excerpt from Electoral results for the Division of Herbert § 1969

1969 Australian federal election: Herbert
Party	Candidate	Votes	%	±%
Labor	Ted Harding	21,318	46.1	−1.6
Liberal	Robert Bonnett	19,738	42.7	+6.9
Democratic Labor	Kiernan Dorney	5,181	11.2	−5.2
Total formal votes		46,237	98.7	
Informal votes		597	1.3	
Turnout		46,834	94.3	
Two-party-preferred result
Liberal	Robert Bonnett	23,897	51.7	+3.0
Labor	Ted Harding	22,340	48.3	−3.0
Liberal gain from Labor		Swing	+3.0	

=== Kennedy ===
This section is an excerpt from Electoral results for the Division of Kennedy § 1969

1969 Australian federal election: Kennedy
Party	Candidate	Votes	%	±%
Country	Bob Katter, Sr.	21,931	54.5	+6.3
Labor	Gerry Jones	16,860	41.9	−0.9
Democratic Labor	Brian Hurney	1,419	3.5	−4.5
Total formal votes		40,210	98.9	
Informal votes		439	1.1	
Turnout		40,649	92.5	
Two-party-preferred result
Country	Bob Katter, Sr.		56.5	+1.6
Labor	Gerry Jones		44.5	−1.6
Country hold		Swing	+1.6	

=== Leichhardt ===
This section is an excerpt from Electoral results for the Division of Leichhardt § 1969

1969 Australian federal election: Leichhardt
Party	Candidate	Votes	%	±%
Labor	Bill Fulton	27,037	62.3	+5.2
Country	David Young	13,844	31.9	−5.6
Democratic Labor	Thomas White	2,526	5.8	+0.4
Total formal votes		43,407	98.2	
Informal votes		795	1.8	
Turnout		44,202	93.0	
Two-party-preferred result
Labor	Bill Fulton		63.5	+6.7
Country	David Young		36.5	−6.7
Labor hold		Swing	+6.7	

=== Lilley ===
This section is an excerpt from Electoral results for the Division of Lilley § 1969

1969 Australian federal election: Lilley
Party	Candidate	Votes	%	±%
Labor	Frank Doyle	24,940	47.1	+7.6
Liberal	Kevin Cairns	23,360	44.1	−8.4
Democratic Labor	Andrew Aitken	4,619	8.7	+1.4
Total formal votes		52,919	98.9	
Informal votes		606	1.1	
Turnout		53,525	94.1	
Two-party-preferred result
Liberal	Kevin Cairns	27,348	51.7	−7.0
Labor	Frank Doyle	25,571	48.3	+7.0
Liberal hold		Swing	−7.0	

=== Maranoa ===
This section is an excerpt from Electoral results for the Division of Maranoa § 1969

1969 Australian federal election: Maranoa
Party	Candidate	Votes	%	±%
Country	James Corbett	23,413	55.4	−5.4
Labor	Edward Bertolotti	16,283	38.5	+8.3
Democratic Labor	John Davis	2,576	6.1	−2.9
Total formal votes		42,272	99.0	
Informal votes		420	1.0	
Turnout		42,692	93.9	
Two-party-preferred result
Country	James Corbett		60.3	−7.7
Labor	Edward Bertolotti		39.7	+7.7
Country hold		Swing	−7.7	

=== McPherson ===
This section is an excerpt from Electoral results for the Division of McPherson § 1969

1969 Australian federal election: McPherson
Party	Candidate	Votes	%	±%
Country	Charles Barnes	26,691	54.2	−9.0
Labor	Wayne Randall	18,310	37.1	+9.0
Democratic Labor	Thomas McKenzie	4,287	8.7	+3.9
Total formal votes		49,288	98.6	
Informal votes		694	1.4	
Turnout		49,982	93.3	
Two-party-preferred result
Country	Charles Barnes		61.2	−7.8
Labor	Wayne Randall		38.8	+7.8
Country hold		Swing	−7.8	

=== Moreton ===
This section is an excerpt from Electoral results for the Division of Moreton § 1969

1969 Australian federal election: Moreton
Party	Candidate	Votes	%	±%
Liberal	James Killen	24,273	48.0	−5.4
Labor	George Harvey	22,456	44.4	+4.6
Democratic Labor	Clarrissa Weedon	2,915	5.8	−1.0
Independent	Kitchener Farrell	891	1.8	+1.8
Total formal votes		50,535	98.6	
Informal votes		697	1.4	
Turnout		51,232	95.0	
Two-party-preferred result
Liberal	James Killen	26,944	53.3	−5.3
Labor	George Harvey	23,591	46.7	+5.3
Liberal hold		Swing	−5.3	

=== Oxley ===
This section is an excerpt from Electoral results for the Division of Oxley § 1969

1969 Australian federal election: Oxley
Party	Candidate	Votes	%	±%
Labor	Bill Hayden	34,084	67.1	+8.2
Liberal	Cyril Morgan	13,676	26.9	+7.2
Democratic Labor	Gavan Duffy	3,048	6.0	+1.9
Total formal votes		50,808	98.2	
Informal votes		935	1.8	
Turnout		51,743	94.9	
Two-party-preferred result
Labor	Bill Hayden		69.1	+7.8
Liberal	Cyril Morgan		30.9	−7.8
Labor hold		Swing	+7.8	

=== Petrie ===
This section is an excerpt from Electoral results for the Division of Petrie § 1969

1969 Australian federal election: Petrie
Party	Candidate	Votes	%	±%
Liberal	Alan Hulme	25,656	47.0	−4.3
Labor	Kenneth Turbet	24,160	44.3	+4.7
Democratic Labor	Robert Macklin	3,168	5.8	−2.8
Australia	Sydney Appleby	1,550	2.8	+2.8
Total formal votes		54,534	98.9	
Informal votes		595	1.1	
Turnout		55,129	95.4	
Two-party-preferred result
Liberal	Alan Hulme	29,383	53.9	−5.9
Labor	Kenneth Turbet	25,151	46.1	+5.9
Liberal hold		Swing	−5.9	

=== Ryan ===
This section is an excerpt from Electoral results for the Division of Ryan § 1969

1969 Australian federal election: Ryan
Party	Candidate	Votes	%	±%
Liberal	Nigel Drury	25,867	49.3	−9.9
Labor	John Conn	22,222	42.4	+11.8
Democratic Labor	Brian O'Brien	4,358	8.3	−0.5
Total formal votes		52,447	98.9	
Informal votes		576	1.1	
Turnout		53,023	95.4	
Two-party-preferred result
Liberal	Nigel Drury	29,444	57.1	−10.5
Labor	John Conn	23,003	43.9	+10.5
Liberal hold		Swing	−10.5	

=== Wide Bay ===
This section is an excerpt from Electoral results for the Division of Wide Bay § 1969

1969 Australian federal election: Wide Bay
Party	Candidate	Votes	%	±%
Labor	Brendan Hansen	27,962	55.1	+7.0
Country	Paul Neville	20,935	41.2	−5.2
Democratic Labor	Laurence Kehoe	1,865	3.7	−1.8
Total formal votes		50,762	99.2	
Informal votes		399	0.8	
Turnout		51,161	96.7	
Two-party-preferred result
Labor	Brendan Hansen		55.8	+6.6
Country	Paul Neville		44.2	−6.6
Labor hold		Swing	+6.6	

== South Australia ==
1969 Australian federal election (South Australia)
- 25 October 1969

All 12 SA seats in the House of Representatives 6 seats needed for a majority
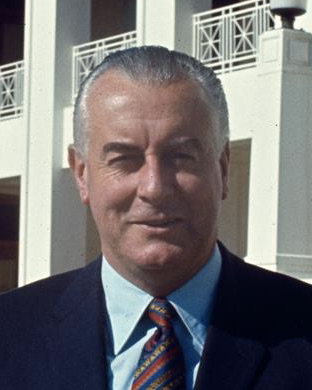

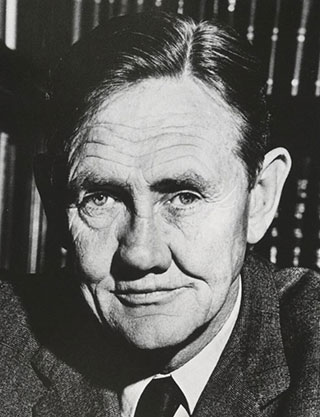
	First party	Second party
Leader	Gough Whitlam	John Gorton
Party	Labor	Coalition
Seats before	3	8
Seats won	8	4
Seat change	▲5	▼4
Popular vote	303,419	245,287
Percentage	52.4%	42.4%
Swing	▲11.7pp	▼11.9pp
TPP	54.2%	45.8%
TPP swing	▲11.8pp	▼11.8pp

=== Adelaide ===
This section is an excerpt from Electoral results for the Division of Adelaide § 1969

1969 Australian federal election: Adelaide
Party	Candidate	Votes	%	±%
Labor	Chris Hurford	29,641	58.3	+12.1
Liberal	Andrew Jones	17,744	34.9	−8.4
Democratic Labor	George Basisovs	2,131	4.2	−0.7
Australia	Anne McMenamin	734	1.4	+1.4
Independent	Anatolij Onishko	582	1.1	+1.1
Total formal votes		50,832	95.3	
Informal votes		2,507	4.7	
Turnout		53,339	95.6	
Two-party-preferred result
Labor	Chris Hurford		61.3	+14.3
Liberal	Andrew Jones		38.7	−14.3
Labor gain from Liberal		Swing	+14.3	

=== Angas ===
This section is an excerpt from Electoral results for the Division of Angas (1949–1977) § 1949

1969 Australian federal election: Angas
Party	Candidate	Votes	%	±%
Liberal	Geoffrey Giles	25,771	57.5	−12.7
Labor	Harold McLaren	16,649	37.2	+7.5
Democratic Labor	Terence Critchley	2,372	5.3	+5.3
Total formal votes		44,792	97.0	
Informal votes		1,375	3.0	
Turnout		46,167	96.4	
Two-party-preferred result
Liberal	Geoffrey Giles		61.9	−8.4
Labor	Harold McLaren		38.1	+8.4
Liberal hold		Swing	−8.4	

=== Barker ===
This section is an excerpt from Electoral results for the Division of Barker § 1969

1969 Australian federal election: Barker
Party	Candidate	Votes	%	±%
Liberal	Jim Forbes	27,176	57.8	−10.5
Labor	John Cornwall	19,873	42.2	+12.1
Total formal votes		47,049	97.5	
Informal votes		1,187	2.5	
Turnout		48,236	96.9	
Liberal hold		Swing	−10.7	

=== Bonython ===
This section is an excerpt from Electoral results for the Division of Bonython § 1969

1969 Australian federal election: Bonython
Party	Candidate	Votes	%	±%
Labor	Martin Nicholls	31,296	63.8	+17.0
Liberal	Rudolph Masopust	12,962	26.4	−17.6
Social Credit	Frank Lawrence	3,757	7.7	+2.1
Democratic Labor	Peter Meredith	1,004	2.0	−1.5
Total formal votes		49,019	96.5	
Informal votes		1,793	3.5	
Turnout		50,812	95.2	
Two-party-preferred result
Labor	Martin Nicholls		67.6	+17.1
Liberal	Rudolph Masopust		32.4	−17.1
Labor hold		Swing	+17.1	

=== Boothby ===
This section is an excerpt from Electoral results for the Division of Boothby § 1969

1969 Australian federal election: Boothby
Party	Candidate	Votes	%	±%
Liberal	John McLeay	27,308	53.5	−12.4
Labor	Chris Sumner	19,391	38.0	+9.3
Democratic Labor	Ted Farrell	2,056	4.0	−1.4
Australia	Frederick Thompson	1,317	2.6	+2.6
Independent	Valerie Lillington	1,014	2.0	+2.0
Total formal votes		51,086	96.5	
Informal votes		1,857	3.5	
Turnout		52,943	95.3	
Two-party-preferred result
Liberal	John McLeay		58.9	−11.5
Labor	Chris Sumner		41.1	+11.5
Liberal hold		Swing	−11.5	

=== Grey ===
This section is an excerpt from Electoral results for the Division of Grey § 1969

1969 Australian federal election: Grey
Party	Candidate	Votes	%	±%
Labor	Laurie Wallis	22,096	49.8	+2.3
Liberal	Don Jessop	19,257	43.4	−3.0
Democratic Labor	Douglas Barnes	1,723	3.9	−2.1
Australia	Thomas Manthorpe	1,314	3.0	+3.0
Total formal votes		44,390	97.0	
Informal votes		1,380	3.0	
Turnout		45,770	95.2	
Two-party-preferred result
Labor	Laurie Wallis		51.9	+3.1
Liberal	Don Jessop		48.1	−3.1
Labor gain from Liberal		Swing	+3.1	

=== Hindmarsh ===
This section is an excerpt from Electoral results for the Division of Hindmarsh § 1969

1969 Australian federal election: Hindmarsh
Party	Candidate	Votes	%	±%
Labor	Clyde Cameron	34,346	68.0	+14.8
Liberal	Michael Cusack	14,402	28.5	−14.6
Democratic Labor	Helena Hubert	1,479	2.9	−0.9
Independent	Steven Gazecimeon	245	0.5	+0.5
Total formal votes		50,472	95.4	
Informal votes		2,413	4.6	
Turnout		52,885	95.8	
Two-party-preferred result
Labor	Clyde Cameron		68.8	+14.8
Liberal	Michael Cusack		31.2	−14.8
Labor hold		Swing	+14.8	

=== Kingston ===
This section is an excerpt from Electoral results for the Division of Kingston § 1969

1969 Australian federal election: Kingston
Party	Candidate	Votes	%	±%
Labor	Richard Gun	26,975	53.4	+17.0
Liberal	Kay Brownbill	21,687	42.9	−14.9
Democratic Labor	Betty Bishop	1,886	3.7	−2.1
Total formal votes		50,548	97.9	
Informal votes		1,060	2.1	
Turnout		51,608	96.7	
Two-party-preferred result
Labor	Richard Gun		53.9	+16.5
Liberal	Kay Brownbill		46.1	−16.5
Labor gain from Liberal		Swing	+16.5	

=== Port Adelaide ===
This section is an excerpt from Electoral results for the Division of Port Adelaide § 1969

1969 Australian federal election: Port Adelaide
Party	Candidate	Votes	%	±%
Labor	Fred Birrell	35,147	70.5	+13.1
Liberal	Reginald Appelkamp	12,409	24.9	−6.3
Social Credit	Denis McEvoy	1,399	2.8	−1.6
Communist	Jim Moss	887	1.8	−0.4
Total formal votes		49,842	94.8	
Informal votes		2,734	5.2	
Turnout		52,576	95.7	
Two-party-preferred result
Labor	Fred Birrell		73.5	+11.0
Liberal	Reginald Appelkamp		26.5	−11.0
Labor hold		Swing	+11.0	

=== Sturt ===
This section is an excerpt from Electoral results for the Division of Sturt § 1969

1969 Australian federal election: Sturt
Party	Candidate	Votes	%	±%
Labor	Norm Foster	24,007	50.0	+16.1
Liberal	Ian Wilson	22,800	47.5	−14.3
Democratic Labor	Paul Hubert	1,164	2.4	−2.0
Total formal votes		47,971	96.7	
Informal votes		1,631	3.3	
Turnout		49,602	96.5	
Two-party-preferred result
Labor	Norm Foster		50.5	+15.0
Liberal	Ian Wilson		49.5	−15.0
Labor gain from Liberal		Swing	+15.0	

=== Wakefield ===
This section is an excerpt from Electoral results for the Division of Wakefield § 1969

1969 Australian federal election: Wakefield
Party	Candidate	Votes	%	±%
Liberal	Bert Kelly	24,685	58.1	−13.1
Labor	Brian Chatterton	15,693	36.9	+8.1
Democratic Labor	John McMahon	2,095	4.9	+4.9
Total formal votes		42,473	97.4	
Informal votes		1,139	2.6	
Turnout		43,612	96.6	
Two-party-preferred result
Liberal	Bert Kelly		62.0	−9.2
Labor	Brian Chatterton		38.0	+9.2
Liberal hold		Swing	−9.2	

== Western Australia ==
1969 Australian federal election (Western Australia)
- 25 October 1969

All 9 WA seats in the House of Representatives 5 seats needed for a majority
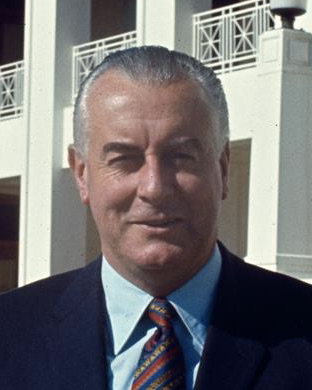

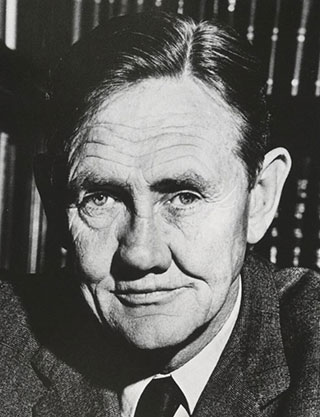
	First party	Second party
Leader	Gough Whitlam	John Gorton
Party	Labor	Coalition
Seats before	3	6
Seats won	6	3
Seat change	▲3	▼3
Popular vote	222,709	188,886
Percentage	50.0%	42.5%
Swing	▲7.2pp	▼6.7pp
TPP	52.6%	47.4%
TPP swing	▲6.9pp	▼6.9pp

=== Canning ===
This section is an excerpt from Electoral results for the Division of Canning § 1969

1969 Australian federal election: Canning
Party	Candidate	Votes	%	±%
Labor	Allan Scott	20,245	42.2	+15.6
Country	John Hallett	14,445	30.1	−13.0
Liberal	Harry Pennington	10,722	22.3	−2.3
Democratic Labor	Maurice Bailey	2,617	5.4	+0.0
Total formal votes		48,029	97.0	
Informal votes		1,506	3.0	
Turnout		49,535	95.5	
Two-party-preferred result
Country	John Hallett	26,318	54.8	−15.4
Labor	Allan Scott	21,711	45.2	+15.4
Country hold		Swing	−15.4	

=== Curtin ===
This section is an excerpt from Electoral results for the Division of Curtin § 1969

1969 Australian federal election: Curtin
Party	Candidate	Votes	%	±%
Liberal	Victor Garland	24,855	49.8	−8.4
Labor	John Williamson	17,275	34.7	+2.7
Democratic Labor	Francis Dwyer	3,533	7.1	−2.7
Independent	Robert Scoggins	3,047	6.1	+6.1
Australia	Len McEntee	1,151	2.3	+2.3
Total formal votes		49,861	97.7	
Informal votes		1,177	2.3	
Turnout		51,038	95.3	
Two-party-preferred result
Liberal	Victor Garland		60.1	−5.9
Labor	John Williamson		39.9	+5.9
Liberal hold		Swing	−5.9	

=== Forrest ===
This section is an excerpt from Electoral results for the Division of Forrest § 1969

1969 Australian federal election: Forrest
Party	Candidate	Votes	%	±%
Labor	Frank Kirwan	22,149	47.6	+9.9
Liberal	Gordon Freeth	19,955	42.9	−9.2
Democratic Labor	Henry Sullivan	3,332	7.2	−3.0
Australia	Anthony Montgomery	1,106	2.4	+2.4
Total formal votes		46,542	97.6	
Informal votes		1,132	2.4	
Turnout		47,674	96.2	
Two-party-preferred result
Labor	Frank Kirwan	23,798	51.1	+11.6
Liberal	Gordon Freeth	22,744	48.9	−11.6
Labor gain from Liberal		Swing	+11.6	

=== Fremantle ===
This section is an excerpt from Electoral results for the Division of Fremantle § 1969

1969 Australian federal election: Fremantle
Party	Candidate	Votes	%	±%
Labor	Kim Beazley Sr.	34,336	63.3	+6.0
Liberal	Robert French	17,520	32.3	−3.5
Democratic Labor	Frank Pownall	2,417	4.5	+0.0
Total formal votes		54,273	97.8	
Informal votes		1,206	2.2	
Turnout		55,479	95.1	
Two-party-preferred result
Labor	Kim Beazley Sr.		64.2	+4.4
Liberal	Robert French		35.8	−4.4
Labor hold		Swing	+4.4	

=== Kalgoorlie ===
This section is an excerpt from Electoral results for the Division of Kalgoorlie § 1969

1969 Australian federal election: Kalgoorlie
Party	Candidate	Votes	%	±%
Labor	Fred Collard	23,138	59.0	+1.6
Liberal	Jim Samson	14,064	35.9	−1.0
Democratic Labor	Geoffrey Sands	1,983	5.1	−0.6
Total formal votes		39,185	98.1	
Informal votes		744	1.9	
Turnout		39,929	89.6	
Two-party-preferred result
Labor	Fred Collard		60.0	+1.5
Liberal	James Samson		40.0	−1.5
Labor hold		Swing	+1.5	

=== Moore ===
This section is an excerpt from Electoral results for the Division of Moore § 1969

1969 Australian federal election: Moore
Party	Candidate	Votes	%	±%
Labor	Peter Walsh	18,829	41.8	+5.9
Country	Don Maisey	13,968	31.0	−3.0
Liberal	Ian Thompson	9,856	21.9	−3.5
Democratic Labor	John Deane	2,390	5.3	+0.6
Total formal votes		45,043	97.5	
Informal votes		1,162	2.5	
Turnout		46,205	94.6	
Two-party-preferred result
Country	Don Maisey	25,000	55.5	−5.0
Labor	Peter Walsh	20,043	44.5	+5.0
Country hold		Swing	−5.0	

=== Perth ===
This section is an excerpt from Electoral results for the Division of Perth § 1969

1969 Australian federal election: Perth
Party	Candidate	Votes	%	±%
Labor	Joe Berinson	29,309	55.1	+15.6
Liberal	Fred Chaney Sr.	20,373	38.3	−8.3
Democratic Labor	John Martyr	2,159	4.1	−3.7
Independent	Patricia Giles	1,308	2.5	+2.5
Total formal votes		53,149	96.6	
Informal votes		1,866	3.4	
Turnout		55,015	93.7	
Two-party-preferred result
Labor	Joe Berinson		58.2	+12.2
Liberal	Fred Chaney Sr.		41.8	−12.2
Labor gain from Liberal		Swing	+12.2	

=== Stirling ===
This section is an excerpt from Electoral results for the Division of Stirling § 1969

1969 Australian federal election: Stirling
Party	Candidate	Votes	%	±%
Labor	Harry Webb	28,468	53.1	+6.6
Liberal	Ian Viner	20,146	37.6	−7.1
Democratic Labor	Brian Peachey	3,422	6.4	−2.4
Australia	Allan Cooke	1,540	2.9	+2.9
Total formal votes		53,576	97.2	
Informal votes		1,562	2.8	
Turnout		55,138	94.8	
Two-party-preferred result
Labor	Harry Webb		55.5	+7.6
Liberal	Ian Viner		44.5	−7.6
Labor gain from Liberal		Swing	+7.6	

=== Swan ===
This section is an excerpt from Electoral results for the Division of Swan § 1969

1969 Australian federal election: Swan
Party	Candidate	Votes	%	±%
Labor	Adrian Bennett	28,960	52.2	+7.8
Liberal	Richard Cleaver	22,982	41.5	−6.3
Democratic Labor	Alan Crofts	2,608	4.7	−3.1
Australia	Arthur Williams	879	1.6	+1.6
Total formal votes		55,429	97.6	
Informal votes		1,344	2.4	
Turnout		56,773	93.8	
Two-party-preferred result
Labor	Adrian Bennett		54.1	+8.3
Liberal	Richard Cleaver		45.9	−8.3
Labor gain from Liberal		Swing	+8.3	

== Tasmania ==
1969 Australian federal election (Tasmania)
- 25 October 1969

All 5 Tasmanian seats in the House of Representatives 3 seats needed for a majority
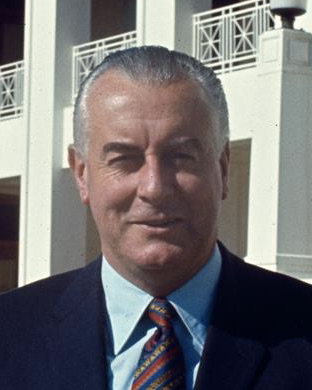

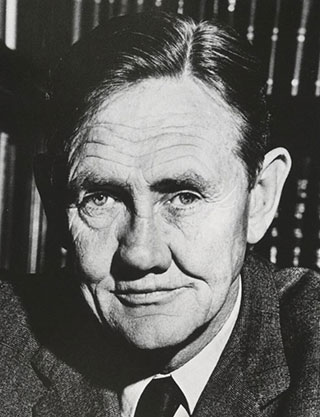
	First party	Second party
Leader	Gough Whitlam	John Gorton
Party	Labor	Coalition
Seats before	3	2
Seats won	4	1
Seat change	▲1	▼1
Popular vote	105,556	72,490
Percentage	52.1%	36.2%
Swing	▲1.2pp	▼6.0pp
TPP	56.1%	43.9%
TPP swing	▲2.2pp	▼2.2pp

=== Bass ===
This section is an excerpt from Electoral results for the Division of Bass § 1969

1969 Australian federal election: Bass
Party	Candidate	Votes	%	±%
Labor	Lance Barnard	20,214	52.2	−4.3
Liberal	Neil Pitt	15,955	41.2	+3.6
Democratic Labor	Peter Ferrall	1,094	2.8	−3.1
Australia	John Kent	1,069	2.8	+2.8
Independent	Geoffrey Batten	398	1.0	+1.0
Total formal votes		38,730	98.1	
Informal votes		742	1.9	
Turnout		39,472	96.4	
Two-party-preferred result
Labor	Lance Barnard		55.0	−2.7
Liberal	Neil Pitt		45.0	+2.7
Labor hold		Swing	−2.7	

=== Braddon ===
This section is an excerpt from Electoral results for the Division of Braddon § 1969

1969 Australian federal election: Braddon
Party	Candidate	Votes	%	±%
Labor	Ron Davies	26,224	62.7	+7.9
Liberal	Peter Rothwell	13,637	32.6	−7.4
Democratic Labor	Dudley McNamara	1,955	4.7	−0.4
Total formal votes		41,816	98.7	
Informal votes		562	1.3	
Turnout		42,378	96.5	
Two-party-preferred result
Labor	Ron Davies		63.6	+7.2
Liberal	Peter Rothwell		36.4	−7.2
Labor hold		Swing	+7.2	

=== Denison ===
This section is an excerpt from Electoral results for the Division of Denison § 1969

1969 Australian federal election: Denison
Party	Candidate	Votes	%	±%
Labor	Alasdair McBurnie	15,588	37.6	−9.7
Liberal	Robert Solomon	11,800	28.5	−17.4
Independent	Michael Townley	10,954	26.4	+26.4
Democratic Labor	Michael Delaney	2,303	5.6	−0.4
Independent	Bill Mollison	791	1.9	+1.9
Total formal votes		41,436	97.3	
Informal votes		1,129	2.7	
Turnout		42,565	95.8	
Two-party-preferred result
Liberal	Robert Solomon	21,775	52.6	−1.9
Labor	Alasdair McBurnie	19,661	47.4	+1.9
Liberal hold		Swing	−1.9	

=== Franklin ===
This section is an excerpt from Electoral results for the Division of Franklin § 1969

1969 Australian federal election: Franklin
Party	Candidate	Votes	%	±%
Labor	Ray Sherry	20,664	54.6	+11.7
Liberal	Thomas Pearsall	15,071	39.8	−10.0
Democratic Labor	Richard Delany	1,563	4.1	−3.2
Independent	Kenneth Newcombe	529	1.4	+1.4
Total formal votes		37,827	98.6	
Informal votes		555	1.4	
Turnout		38,382	97.3	
Two-party-preferred result
Labor	Ray Sherry		55.9	+9.9
Liberal	Thomas Pearsall		44.1	−9.9
Labor gain from Liberal		Swing	+9.9	

=== Wilmot ===
This section is an excerpt from Electoral results for the Division of Wilmot § 1969

1969 Australian federal election: Wilmot
Party	Candidate	Votes	%	±%
Labor	Gil Duthie	22,866	56.3	+2.1
Liberal	Donald Paterson	16,027	39.5	−1.0
Democratic Labor	Darryl Sulzberger	1,720	4.2	−1.5
Total formal votes		40,613	98.7	
Informal votes		550	1.3	
Turnout		41,163	97.0	
Two-party-preferred result
Labor	Gil Duthie		57.1	+1.8
Liberal	Donald Paterson		42.9	−1.8
Labor hold		Swing	+1.8	

== Territories ==
=== Australian Capital Territory ===
1969 Australian federal election (Australian Capital Territory)
- 25 October 1969

Division of Australian Capital Territory
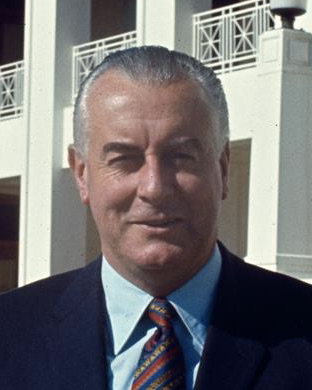

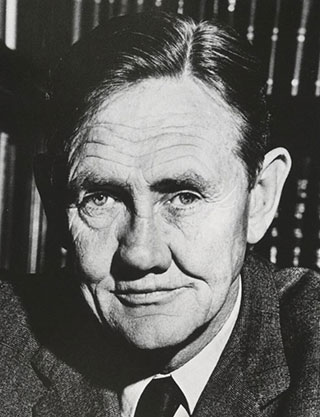
	First party	Second party
Leader	Gough Whitlam	John Gorton
Party	Labor	Coalition
Seats before	1	0
Seats won	1	0
Seat change	Steady	Steady
Popular vote	39,070	15,492
Percentage	67.7%	26.9%
Swing	▲16.0pp	▼11.0pp
TPP	71.4%	28.8%
TPP swing	▲15.4pp	▼15.4pp

This section is an excerpt from Electoral results for the Division of Australian Capital Territory § 1969

1969 Australian federal election: Australian Capital Territory
Party	Candidate	Votes	%	±%
Labor	Jim Fraser	39,070	67.7	+16.0
Liberal	Robert Maher	15,492	26.9	−11.0
Australia	Thomas McDermott	2,651	4.6	+4.6
Communist	Don McHugh	477	0.8	+0.8
Total formal votes		57,690	98.2	
Informal votes		1,083	1.8	
Turnout		58,773	92.9	
Two-party-preferred result
Labor	Jim Fraser		71.2	+15.4
Liberal	Robert Maher		28.8	−15.4
Labor hold		Swing	+15.4	

=== Northern Territory ===
1969 Australian federal election (Northern Territory)
- 25 October 1969

Division of Northern Territory
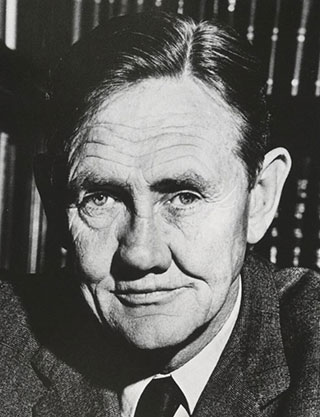

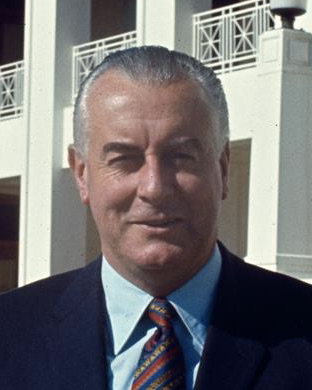
	First party	Second party
Leader	John Gorton	Gough Whitlam
Party	Coalition	Labor
Seats before	1	0
Seats won	1	0
Seat change	Steady	Steady
Popular vote	8,281	5,204
Percentage	48.4%	30.4%
Swing	▼3.3pp	▼17.9pp
TPP	59.2%	40.8%
TPP swing	▲7.5pp	▼7.5pp

This section is an excerpt from Electoral results for the Division of Northern Territory § 1969

1969 Australian federal election: Northern Territory
Party	Candidate	Votes	%	±%
Country	Sam Calder	8,281	48.4	−3.3
Labor	Ted Robertson	5,204	30.4	−17.9
Independent	Harold Brennan	3,377	19.7	+19.7
Independent	Alan Gray	252	1.5	+1.5
Total formal votes		17,114	96.5	
Informal votes		613	3.5	
Turnout		17,727	83.7	
Two-party-preferred result
Country	Sam Calder	10,137	59.2	+7.5
Labor	Ted Robertson	6,977	40.8	−7.5
Country hold		Swing	+7.5	

== See also ==
- Candidates of the 1969 Australian federal election
- Members of the Australian House of Representatives, 1969–1972
- Results of the 1970 Australian federal election (Senate)
