= Candidates of the 1969 Australian federal election =

This article provides information on candidates who stood for the 1969 Australian federal election. The election was held on 25 October 1969.

== Redistributions and seat changes ==
- Redistributions of electoral boundaries occurred in all states.
  - In New South Wales, six seats were abolished: the Labor-held seats of Dalley, East Sydney, Watson and West Sydney; the Liberal-held seat of Parkes; and the Country-held seat of Lawson. Five new seats were created: the notionally Labor seats of Chifley, Prospect and Sydney; and the notionally Liberal seats of Berowra and Cook. The Liberal-held seat of Hughes became notionally Labor.
    - The member for Hughes, Don Dobie (Liberal), contested Cook.
    - The member for Parkes, Tom Hughes (Liberal), contested Berowra.
    - The member for Watson, Jim Cope (Labor), contested Sydney.
  - In Victoria, the Labor-held seat of Darebin was renamed Scullin and the Liberal-held seat of Higinbotham was renamed Hotham. The Liberal-held seats of Fawkner and Isaacs and the Labor-held seats of (the pre-existing) Scullin and Yarra were abolished. A new, Liberal-held seat of Isaacs, unconnected to the previous one, was created. Four other new seats were also created: the Labor-held seats of Burke and Holt and the Liberal-held seats of Casey and Diamond Valley. The Liberal-held seat of Lalor and the Independent-held seat of Batman became notionally Labor, and the Labor-held seat of Melbourne Ports became notionally Liberal.
    - The member for Fawkner, Peter Howson (Liberal), contested Casey.
    - The member for Higinbotham, Don Chipp (Liberal), contested Hotham.
    - The member for Lalor, Mervyn Lee (Liberal), contested Bendigo.
    - The member for Yarra, Jim Cairns (Labor), contested Lalor.
  - In Queensland, the Labor-held seat of Brisbane became notionally Liberal, the Liberal-held seat of Herbert became notionally Labor, and the Labor-held seat of Wide Bay became notionally Country.
  - In Western Australia, the Labor-held seat of Stirling became notionally Liberal.
  - In South Australia, the notionally Liberal seat of Hawker was created.
  - There were minimal changes in Tasmania.

== Retiring Members ==
=== Labor ===
- Joe Clark MP (Darling, NSW)
- Eric Costa MP (Banks, NSW)
- Frank Courtnay MP (Darebin, Vic)
- Dan Curtin MP (Kingsford-Smith, NSW)
- Len Devine MP (East Sydney, NSW)
- Eli Harrison MP (Blaxland, NSW)
- Dan Minogue MP (West Sydney, NSW)
- William O'Connor MP (Dalley, NSW)
- Ted Peters MP (Scullin, Vic)

=== Liberal ===
- Allen Fairhall MP (Paterson, NSW)
- Adrian Gibson MP (Denison, Tas)
- Sir William Haworth MP (Isaacs, Vic)

=== Country ===
- Laurie Failes MP (Lawson, NSW)

=== Independent ===
- Sam Benson MP (Batman, Vic)

== House of Representatives ==
Sitting members at the time of the election are shown in bold text. Successful candidates are highlighted in the relevant colour. Where there is possible confusion, an asterisk (*) is also used.

=== Australian Capital Territory ===
Electorate	Held by	Labor candidate	Liberal candidate	Australia candidate	Communist candidate
Australian Capital Territory	Labor	**Jim Fraser**	Robert Maher	Thomas McDermott	Don McHugh

=== New South Wales ===
Electorate	Held by	Labor candidate	Coalition candidate	DLP candidate	Australia candidate	Other candidates
Banks	Labor	Vince Martin	Herman Tibben (Lib)	Annette Andrew		Peter Allen (Ind); Reginald Jones (Ind); Kevin Watt (Ind)
Barton	Liberal	Len Reynolds	**Bill Arthur** (Lib)	Charles Chapman		Charles Bellchambers (Ind); Ray Emmerson (Ind); Alan Reed (Ind)
Bennelong	Liberal	Peter Evatt	**Sir John Cramer** (Lib)	Ronald Claridge	Kenneth Cook	Allan Horton (Ind)
Berowra	Liberal	George Williams	**Tom Hughes** (Lib)	Neil Mackerras	David Haig	Edith Parrish (Ind)
Blaxland	Labor	Paul Keating	John Ghent (Lib)	Joseph Conroy		
Bradfield	Liberal	Keith Crook	**Harry Turner** (Lib)	Anthony Felton	Barbara Wilson	Betty Loneragan (Ind)
Calare	Country	Kerry Scott	**John England** (CP)	John Grant		
Chifley	Labor	John Armitage	Milovan Kovjanic (Lib)	Stan Aster-Stater		Victor Corcoran (Ind)
Cook	Liberal	Cliff Mallam	**Don Dobie** (Lib)		Bernard Walrut	Robin Alleway (Ind)
Cowper	Country		**Ian Robinson** (CP)			Brian Richards (Ind); Neil Royal (Ind)
Cunningham	Labor	**Rex Connor**	John Poel (Lib)			Reg Wilding (CPA)
Darling	Labor	John FitzPatrick	Jack Bonney (Lib); Max Overton (CP)			
Eden-Monaro	Liberal	Allan Fraser	**Dugald Munro** (Lib)	John Donohue	Patrick Starrs	
Evans	Liberal	James Monaghan	**Malcolm Mackay** (Lib)	Kevin Davis	John Fisher	Hal Saunders (Ind)
Farrer	Liberal	Noel Murray	**David Fairbairn** (Lib)	James Keogh		John Ross (Ind)
Grayndler	Labor	**Fred Daly**	Jonathan Fowler (Lib)			
Gwydir	Country	Roger Nott	**Ralph Hunt** (CP)		Brian Edwards	Halwyn Webster (Ind)
Hughes	Labor	Les Johnson	Carl Leddy (Lib)	William Goslett		Marjorie Williams (Ind)
Hume	Country	Frank Olley	**Ian Pettitt** (CP)	James Manwaring		
Hunter	Labor	**Bert James**	Raymond Hughes (Lib)			
Kingsford-Smith	Labor	Lionel Bowen	Barry Morrison (Lib)	Graham Bennett		Beverly Chong (PPA)
Lang	Labor	**Frank Stewart**	Stanley Duncan (Lib)	Dominique Droulers		Jack Mundey (CPA); Bert Tripet (Ind)
Lowe	Liberal	Peter Young	**William McMahon** (Lib)	Agnes Bannon		Patricia Bailey (Ind); Bernard MacMahon (Ind)
Lyne	Country	John Allan	**Philip Lucock** (CP)		Percival McPherson	Joe Cordner (Ind)
Macarthur	Liberal	Bob Whan	**Jeff Bate** (Lib)		Brian Wyer	Sidney Sheedy (PPA)
Mackellar	Liberal	William Bramwell	**Bill Wentworth** (Lib)	Thomas Colman		
Macquarie	Labor	**Tony Luchetti**	John MacDonnell (Lib)	Leslie Clarke	Norman Lee	
Mitchell	Liberal	Alfred Ashley-Brown	**Les Irwin** (Lib)	John Maguire	Gordon Waller	Harvey Clift (PPA)
New England	Country	Alan Kitson	**Ian Sinclair** (CP)			
Newcastle	Labor	**Charles Jones**	Alfred Appleby (Lib)		Wlodzimierz Bohakto	
North Sydney	Liberal	Mervyn Page	**Bill Graham** (Lib)	Reginald Lawson		Romualds Kemps (Ind)
Parramatta	Liberal	Barry Wilde	**Nigel Bowen** (Lib)	Hans Andreasson		John Keeffe (Ind); Leonard Kiernan (Ind)
Paterson	Liberal	Francis Murray	John Jobling (Lib); Frank O'Keefe* (CP)	Jack Collins	Ted Fletcher	Adrian Edwards (Ind)
Phillip	Liberal	Joe Riordan	**William Aston** (Lib)	Lyle Antcliff	Jack Gray	Totti Cohen (Ind); Alex MacDonald (Ind); Ronald Rigby (Ind); William Whitby (PPA); Ken Yeomans (Ind)
Prospect	Labor	Dick Klugman	Stanislaus Kelly (Lib)	John Ferguson		
Reid	Labor	**Tom Uren**	Stanley Hedges (Lib)	Mick Carroll		Norman Hurst (Ind)
Richmond	Country	Joseph Gilmore	**Doug Anthony** (CP)			
Riverina	Country	Al Grassby	**Bill Armstrong** (CP)	Patrick Barry		
Robertson	Liberal	Barry Cohen	**William Bridges-Maxwell** (Lib)			Wallace Cook (Ind); Albert Date (Ind)
St George	Liberal	Bill Morrison	**Len Bosman** (Lib)	Henry Bader	Christopher Owens	Archibald Lawless (Ind); Emanuel Said (Ind)
Shortland	Labor	**Charles Griffiths**	Paul Clarkson (Lib)	Robert Burke	Charles Hockings	Geoff Curthoys (CPA)
Sydney	Labor	**Jim Cope**	Graham Robertson (Lib)	Norma Boyle		Ian Channell (Ind); Donald Lewis (PPA); Nick Origlass (Ind); Shane Watson (Ind)
Warringah	Liberal	Thomas Reynolds	Michael MacKellar (Lib)	Peter Keogh		Eric Riches (Ind); **Edward St John** (Ind); Albert Thompson (PPA)
Wentworth	Liberal	Frederick Cross	**Les Bury** (Lib)	Doris Brown		Geoff Mullen (Ind); Neville Yeomans (PPA)
Werriwa	Labor	**Gough Whitlam**	Christopher May (Lib)	William Arundel		Fay McCallum (Ind); William Sadler (Ind); Don Syme (CPA)

=== Northern Territory ===
Electorate	Held by	Labor candidate	Country candidate	Independent candidate
Northern Territory	Country	Ted Robertson	**Sam Calder**	Harold Brennan; Alan Gray

=== Queensland ===
Electorate	Held by	Labor candidate	Coalition candidate	DLP candidate	Other candidates
Bowman	Liberal	Len Keogh	**Wylie Gibbs** (Lib)	Noel Tennison	Harold Asmith (Ind)
Brisbane	Liberal	**Manfred Cross**	Greg O'Dwyer (Lib)	Roger Judge	
Capricornia	Labor	**Doug Everingham**	Brian Palmer (Lib)	Alfred Rose	
Darling Downs	Liberal	Eugene Salas	**Reginald Swartz** (Lib)	Francis Mullins	
Dawson	Labor	**Rex Patterson**	John Hinz (CP)	Bernard Lewis	
Fisher	Country	Ian Budge	**Charles Adermann** (CP)	Robert Barron	
Griffith	Liberal	Barry Gorman	**Don Cameron** (Lib)	Cecil Birchley	Trevor Sturling (Ind)
Herbert	Labor	Ted Harding	**Robert Bonnett** (Lib)	Kiernan Dorney	
Kennedy	Country	Gerry Jones	**Bob Katter** (CP)	Brian Hurney	
Leichhardt	Labor	**Bill Fulton**	David Young (CP)	Thomas White	
Lilley	Liberal	Frank Doyle	**Kevin Cairns** (Lib)	Andrew Aitken	
McPherson	Country	Wayne Randall	**Charles Barnes** (CP)	Thomas McKenzie	
Maranoa	Country	Edward Bertolotti	**James Corbett** (CP)	John Davis	
Moreton	Liberal	George Harvey	**James Killen** (Lib)	Clarrissa Weedon	Kitchener Farrell (Ind)
Oxley	Labor	**Bill Hayden**	Cyril Morgan (Lib)	Gavan Duffy	
Petrie	Liberal	Kenneth Turbet	**Alan Hulme** (Lib)	Robert Macklin	Sydney Appleby (AP)
Ryan	Liberal	John Conn	**Nigel Drury** (Lib)	Brian O'Brien	
Wide Bay	Labor	**Brendan Hansen**	Paul Neville (CP)	Laurence Kehoe	

=== South Australia ===
Electorate	Held by	Labor candidate	Liberal candidate	DLP candidate	Australia candidate	Other candidates
Adelaide	Liberal	Chris Hurford	**Andrew Jones**	George Basisovs	Anne McMenamin	Anatolij Onishko (Ind)
Angas	Liberal	Harold McLaren	**Geoffrey Giles**	Terence Critchley		
Barker	Liberal	John Cornwall	**Jim Forbes**			
Bonython	Labor	**Martin Nicholls**	Rudolph Masopust	Peter Meredith		Frank Lawrence (SCP)
Boothby	Liberal	Chris Sumner	**John McLeay**	Ted Farrell	Frederick Thompson	Valerie Lillington (Ind)
Grey	Liberal	Laurie Wallis	**Don Jessop**	Douglas Barnes	Thomas Manthorpe	
Hawker	Liberal	Ralph Jacobi	Alan Hickinbotham	Kathleen Anderson	Malcolm Hawkins	
Hindmarsh	Labor	**Clyde Cameron**	Michael Cusack	Helena Hubert		Steven Gazecimeon (Ind)
Kingston	Liberal	Richard Gun	**Kay Brownbill**	Betty Bishop		
Port Adelaide	Labor	**Fred Birrell**	Reginald Appelkamp			Denis McEvoy (SCP); Jim Moss (CPA)
Sturt	Liberal	Norm Foster	**Ian Wilson**	Paul Hubert		
Wakefield	Liberal	Brian Chatterton	**Bert Kelly**	John McMahon		

=== Tasmania ===
Electorate	Held by	Labor candidate	Liberal candidate	DLP candidate	Other candidates
Bass	Labor	**Lance Barnard**	Neil Pitt	Peter Ferrall	Geoffrey Batten (Ind); John Kent (AP)
Braddon	Labor	**Ron Davies**	Peter Rothwell	Dudley McNamara	
Denison	Liberal	Alasdair McBurnie	Robert Solomon	Michael Delaney	Bill Mollison (Ind); Michael Townley (Ind)
Franklin	Liberal	Ray Sherry	**Thomas Pearsall**	Richard Delany	Kenneth Newcombe (Ind)
Wilmot	Labor	**Gil Duthie**	Donald Paterson	Darryl Sulzberger	

=== Victoria ===
Electorate	Held by	Labor candidate	Coalition candidate	DLP candidate	Other candidates
Balaclava	Liberal	Irene Dunsmuir	**Ray Whittorn** (Lib)	Ralph James	Steven Soos (AP)
Ballaarat	Liberal	David Pollock	**Dudley Erwin** (Lib)	Bob Joshua	Graeme Bond (Ind); Hendrik Prins (Ind); David Swinnerton (Ind)
Batman	Labor	Horrie Garrick	Peter McGrath (Lib)	Henry Darroch	Ronald Hayles (Ind)
Bendigo	Labor	**David Kennedy**	**Mervyn Lee** (Lib)	Paul Brennan	
Bruce	Liberal	Leon Phillips	**Billy Snedden** (Lib)	William Hoyne	Douglas McKay (AP); Les Smith (CPA); Herbert Wessley (Ind)
Burke	Labor	Keith Johnson	John Williams (Lib)	Terence Scully	Kathleen Laherty (Ind); Richard Smith (AP)
Casey	Liberal	Duncan Waterson	**Peter Howson** (Lib)	Kevin Adamson	Joe Schillani (Ind); Leonard Weber (AP)
Chisholm	Liberal	Anthony Dwyer	**Sir Wilfrid Kent Hughes** (Lib)	John Rogers	Andrew Morrow (AP)
Corangamite	Liberal	Neil Moorfoot	**Tony Street** (Lib)	Francis O'Brien	
Corio	Labor	**Gordon Scholes**	Charles Malpas (Lib)	John Timberlake	Elsie Brushfield (Ind); Stuart Harris (Ind)
Deakin	Liberal	Bernard Mildner	**Alan Jarman** (Lib)	Maurice Weston	Ray Nilsen (Ind)
Diamond Valley	Liberal	David McKenzie	Neil Brown (Lib)	Leo Morison	John Hill (AP)
Flinders	Liberal	Fay Nottage	**Phillip Lynch** (Lib)	Josephus Gobel	Monty Hollow (Ind)
Gellibrand	Labor	**Hector McIvor**	Ian Crouch (Lib)	Robin Thomas	
Gippsland	Country	John Wolfe	**Peter Nixon** (CP)	John Hansen	
Henty	Liberal	Robert Ray	**Max Fox** (Lib)	John Launder	Herman Crowther (Ind)
Higgins	Liberal	Wilhelm Kapphan	**John Gorton** (Lib)	Peter Grant	Walter Pickering (AP); Morris Revelman (Ind)
Holt	Liberal	William Wilkinson	Len Reid (Lib)	Henri de Sachau	
Hotham	Liberal	Kevin Vaughan	**Don Chipp** (Lib)	Ian Radnell	Kenneth Nolan (AP)
Indi	Country	Robert Cross	Roy Harle (Lib); **Mac Holten*** (CP)	Christopher Cody	
Isaacs	Liberal	Alan Roberts	David Hamer (Lib)	Frederick Skinner	Liane Wessley (Ind)
Kooyong	Liberal	Richard Dunstan	**Andrew Peacock** (Lib)	Francis Duffy	
La Trobe	Liberal	Pauline McCarthy	**John Jess** (Lib)	Peter Tunstall	Brenda Elliott (AP)
Lalor	Labor	**Jim Cairns**	Vaclav Ubl (Lib)	John Bacon	Tom Gilhooley (Ind)
Mallee	Country	Ronald Davies	James McFarlane (Lib); **Winton Turnbull*** (CP)	Peter Lawrence	
Maribyrnong	Liberal	Moss Cass	**Philip Stokes** (Lib)	Jim Marmion	Lance Hutchinson (Ind); Daphne Thorne (Ind)
McMillan	Liberal	Frank Mountford	**Alex Buchanan*** (Lib); John Dwyer (CP)	Les Hilton	
Melbourne	Labor	**Arthur Calwell**	Peter Block (Lib)	John Ryan	Murray Thompson (Ind)
Melbourne Ports	Liberal	**Frank Crean**	Kevin Randall (Lib)	Eustace Tracey	George Gabriel (Ind); Stephen Graves (Ind); Reg Macey (Ind)
Murray	Country	Neil Frankland	**John McEwen** (CP)	Brian Lacey	Bill Hunter (Ind)
Scullin	Labor	Harry Jenkins	James Spicer (Lib)	Tom Andrews	Brendon Connor (Ind)
Wannon	Liberal	Kenneth Ginifer	**Malcolm Fraser** (Lib)	Maurice Purcell	
Wills	Labor	**Gordon Bryant**	Peter Frankel (Lib)	John Flint	John Bennett (Ind); Milan Breier (Ind); Geraldine Phelan (Ind)
Wimmera	Country	Brian Brooke	Miles Bourke (Lib); **Robert King*** (CP)	Brian Cronin	

=== Western Australia ===
Electorate	Held by	Labor candidate	Coalition candidate	DLP candidate	Other candidates
Canning	Country	Allan Scott	**John Hallett*** (CP); Harry Pennington (Lib)	Maurice Bailey	
Curtin	Liberal	John Williamson	**Victor Garland** (Lib)	Francis Dwyer	Len McEntee (AP); Robert Scoggins (Ind)
Forrest	Liberal	Frank Kirwan	**Gordon Freeth** (Lib)	Henry Sullivan	Anthony Montgomery (AP)
Fremantle	Labor	**Kim Beazley**	Robert French (Lib)	Frank Pownall	
Kalgoorlie	Labor	**Fred Collard**	Jim Samson (Lib)	Geoffrey Sands	
Moore	Country	Peter Walsh	**Don Maisey*** (CP); Ian Thompson (Lib)	John Deane	
Perth	Liberal	Joe Berinson	**Fred Chaney** (Lib)	John Martyr	Patricia Giles (Ind)
Stirling	Liberal	**Harry Webb**	Ian Viner (Lib)	Brian Peachey	Allan Cooke (AP)
Swan	Liberal	Adrian Bennett	**Richard Cleaver** (Lib)	Alan Crofts	Arthur Williams (AP)

== Senate ==
Sitting Senators are shown in bold text. Tickets that elected at least one Senator are highlighted in the relevant colour. Successful candidates are identified by an asterisk (*).

=== South Australia ===
A special election was held in South Australia to fill the vacancy caused by the death of Liberal Senator Keith Laught. Martin Cameron, also of the Liberal Party, had been appointed to this vacancy in the interim.

Labor candidate	Liberal candidate	DLP candidate	Australia candidate	Other candidates
Don Cameron*	**Martin Cameron**	Mark Posa	Norman Munn	William Henry (SCP); Steven Gazecimeon (Ind)

=== Victoria ===
A special election was held in Victoria to fill the vacancy caused by the resignation of Liberal Senator John Gorton. Ivor Greenwood, also of the Liberal Party, had been appointed to this vacancy in the interim.

Labor candidate	Liberal candidate	DLP candidate	Australia candidate	Independent candidates
Bill Brown	**Ivor Greenwood***	Frank Dowling	Adrian van Riel	Ray Evans; John Murray; Edwin Ryan

== Summary by party ==
Beside each party is the number of seats contested by that party in the House of Representatives for each state, as well as an indication of whether the party contested special Senate elections in Victoria and South Australia.

Party	NSW	Vic		Qld	WA	SA		Tas	ACT	NT	Total	
Party	HR	HR	S	HR	HR	HR	S	HR	HR	HR	HR	S
Australian Labor Party	44	34	*	18	9	12	*	5	1	1	124	2
Liberal Party of Australia	37	32	*	11	9	12	*	5	1		107	2
Australian Country Party	10	6		7	2					1	26	
Democratic Labor Party	32	34	*	18	9	10	*	5			108	2
Australia Party	16	9	*	1	4	4	*	1	1		36	2
Communist Party of Australia	4	1				1			1		7	
Social Credit Party						2	*				2	1
Independent and other	49	26		3	2	3		4		2	89	

== See also ==
- 1969 Australian federal election
- Members of the Australian House of Representatives, 1966–1969
- Members of the Australian House of Representatives, 1969–1972
- List of political parties in Australia
