= Michael Matteson =

Australian activist

Michael Matteson is an anti-war activist who resisted conscription into the Australian Army during the Vietnam War, due to his anarchist philosophy and principles.

In 1972, Matteson was being escorted by two Commonwealth policemen—handcuffed to one at each wrist—as he had previously taken part in highly public escapes. As the police escorted him through Sydney University, thousands of university students nonviolently confronted and blockaded the officers' movement. The combined action of the students pressured the officers into freeing Matteson. The event became known as the "Michael Matteson Handcuff Incident".

== See also ==
- Geoff Mullen
- Anarchism in Australia
