= Peter Evatt =

Australian rower (1922–1972)

Personal information
- Nationality: Australian
- Born: 5 January 1922 Sydney, Australia
- Died: 23 December 1972 (aged 50) Ryde, New South Wales, Australia

Sport
- Sport: Rowing
Medal record
Men's rowing
Representing Australia
British Empire (and Commonwealth) Games
Gold medal – first place	1954 Vancouver	Coxed four

Peter Maitland Evatt (5 January 1922 – 23 December 1972) was an Australian rower. He competed in the men's coxless four event at the 1956 Summer Olympics. He was the national single-sculls rowing champion in 1953, and won a gold medal in the men's coxed four at the 1954 British Empire and Commonwealth Games in Vancouver.

Evatt was the son of Australian politician Herbert Vere Evatt, and his sporting career overlapped with his father's service as Leader of the Opposition. He stood unsuccessfully for the Labor Party in the Division of Bennelong at the 1969 federal election. He also contested Labor preselection for Bennelong in December 1970, but was defeated.

Evatt died at his home in Ryde in December 1972 after being electrocuted while repairing a toaster. His body was not found until two days after he died. At the time of his death, he was working in the legal section of the Department of Housing.
