= Totti Cohen =

Australian educational reformer (1932–2010)

Teofila "Totti" Cohen AM OBE, (née Kaplun; 5 March 1932 – 29 August 2010) was an Australian educational reformer and solicitor who served as president of the Federation of Parents and Citizens Associations of New South Wales from 1973 to 1980.

== Biography ==
Teofila (nickname, "Totti") Kaplun was born in Paddington to Polish-Jewish emigrants Stanley Kaplun and Adel, née Gutman. She attended local primary schools and then Parramatta and Sydney Girls' high schools. She topped the state in history in the Leaving Certificate, also winning first-class honours in English and Latin; consequently she won a scholarship to the University of Sydney, where she graduated with a Bachelor of Arts and a Bachelor of Law in 1956. In that year she married Neville Albert Cohen; they would adopt one son in 1960 before Cohen gave birth to another in 1961. She was the first woman employed as a solicitor at Minter Simpson, before moving to F. W. Jenkins and Co. which she eventually bought after Jenkins's death.

She explored the option of teaching when her sons began attending school and enrolled externally at the University of New England, but discovered that teaching positions were only readily available north of Tamworth and gave up the idea. She joined the Parents and Citizens (P&C) Association at Coogee and by 1968 rose to the state council. She ran as a candidate for the Defence of Government Schools group in the 1969 federal election, challenging the Speaker of the House, Sir William Aston, for his seat of Phillip; she received 2.3% of the vote. In 1973 she was elected president of the Federation of P&C Associations, and significantly increased the influence and political involvement of the organisation. Awarded an OBE in 1978, she was a parent representative on the Education Commission and vice-president of the Australian Council of School Organisations. She retired in 1980.

Following her retirement from the P&C presidency, Cohen served part-time on the Social Security Appeals Tribunal and the Consumer, Trading and Tenancy Tribunal, and was chairwoman of the New South Wales Privacy Committee from 1983 to 1993. Awarded the AM in 1987, she was also involved in the National Council of Jewish Women and the Jewish Board of Deputies. She died in 2010.
