= Geoff Mullen =

Australian programmer (1947–2014)

Geoffrey Richard Mullen (16 March 1947 – 25 November 2014) was an Australian draft resister whose jailing in 1971 became a focal point of opposition to conscription for the Vietnam War.

Mullen was born in Darlinghurst and attended Waverley College on scholarship. He attended the University of Sydney. In 1967 he registered for national service, but having become a fierce opponent of the Vietnam War, he refused medical examinations in 1968. An avowed anarchist, he worked briefly for the Australian Broadcasting Corporation and the University of New England before becoming a computer programmer at IBM in Sydney. Imprisoned for 29 days in February 1969, he wrote anti-conscription articles for the Sydney Morning Herald and the Tribune, and ran in the 1969 federal election as an independent candidate for Wentworth, in opposition to Les Bury, the Minister for Labour and National Service. In February 1971 he was arrested; he refused to plead as a conscientious objector, was sentenced to two years in prison, and served for twelve months. His cause attracted great attention and was championed by left-wing Labor MPs Tom Uren and George Petersen. In prison he completed a post-graduate Bachelor of Literature; after his release he returned to IBM but later became an independent contractor. He retired at the age of sixty and in his later years was noted as a prolific writer of letters to newspapers. Mullen died at St Vincent's Hospital in 2014.

== See also ==
- Michael Matteson
- Anarchism in Australia
