= Keith Crook =

Australian geologist (1933–2020)

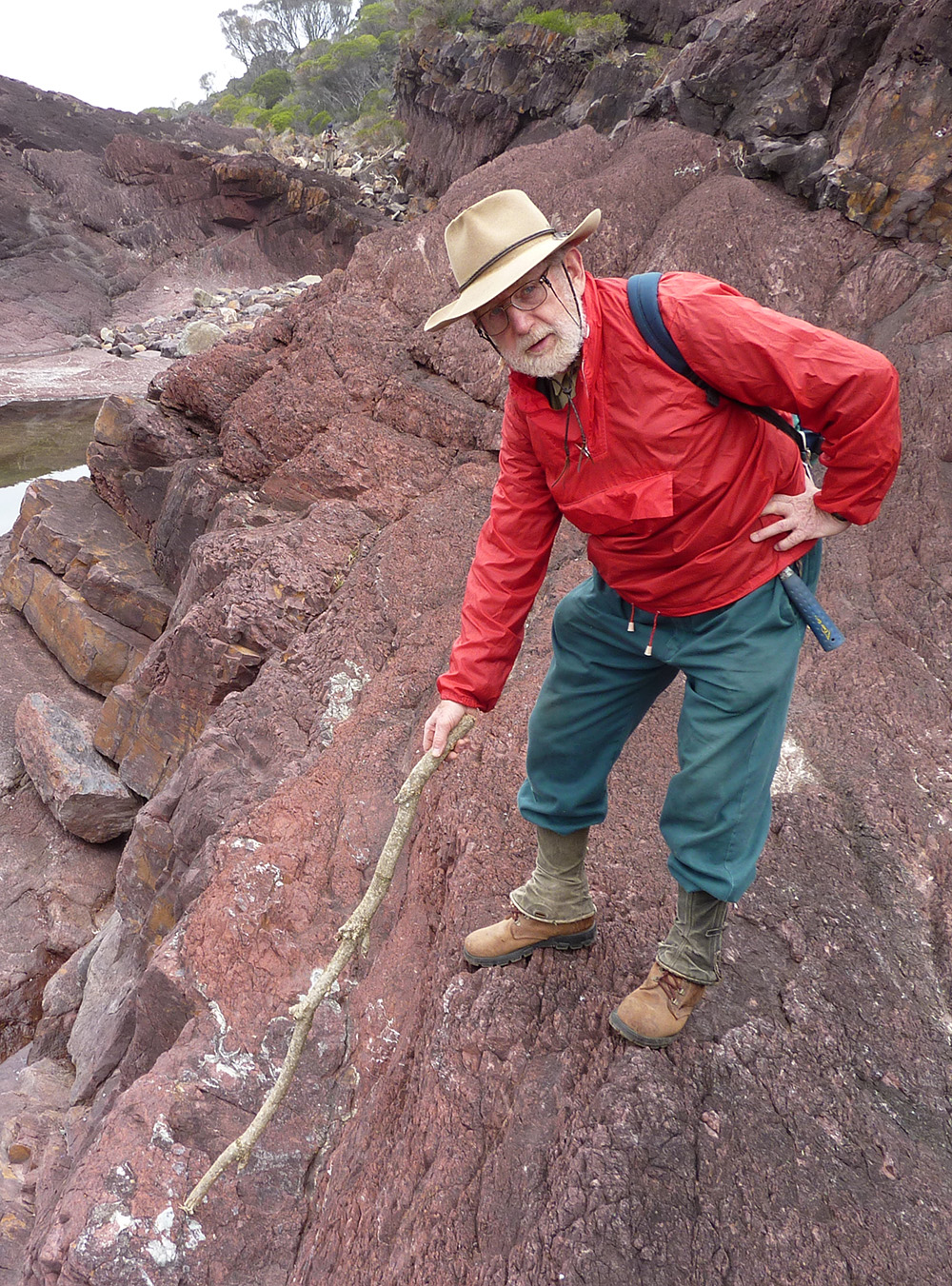
Keith Crook pointing out fossilised Edenopteron fish remains near Eden NSW in 2010

Keith Alan Waterhouse Crook (3 August 1933 – 18 February 2020) was an Australian geologist and Clarke Medalist.

== Education ==
Keith Crook attended Newington College from 1944 to 1949 and the University of Sydney from whence he graduated as a Bachelor of Science in 1954 and a Master of Science in 1956. He then did a PhD at the University of New England from 1956 until 1959, followed by postdoctoral studies at the University of Melbourne and the University of Alberta, Canada, from 1959 until 1961.

== Teaching career ==
In 1961, Crook took a position at the Australian National University (ANU) teaching sedimentology and stratigraphy. He undertook research in New Guinea and Tumut, New South Wales. This research was concerned with the tectonic development of sedimentary basins. In mid-1992 Crook was appointed to a position at the University of Hawaiʻi as Science Program Director of the Undersea Laboratory. He returned to the ANU as a visiting fellow in mid-2004, where he continued his research until 2017. In 2008 a new species of prehistoric armoured lobe-finned fish discovered near Eden, New South Wales by a team of ANU scientists was named Edenopteron keithcrooki, in honour of Keith Crook. This was in recognition of Crook's discovery of several fossil sites in New South Wales, plus coordinating the mapping of a large area around Eden and Twofold Bay by staff and students of his at the ANU.

== Pacifism and political involvement ==
In 1955, Crook was drafted into military service, which crystallized his disquiet on the use of war and violence as political tools, and he subsequently was granted an exemption as a conscientious objector. Around this time he started attending Quaker meetings, whose Peace testimony accorded with his own thoughts, and he joined as a member in 1958. In 1963 Crook joined the Australian Labor Party and stood as a candidate in the 1969 federal election for the seat of Bradfield. Dr Crook served as a long-term scientific policy advisor for the Australian Labor Party, commencing under Gough Whitlam. In 1970 he presented the James Backhouse Lecture in Melbourne, entitled "Security for Australia?".

== Personal life ==
Crook was the son of Alan Crook and Muriel Waterhouse. He met and married Norma Jean Fuller in Edmonton, Alberta, Canada in 1961 and they had three children. After divorcing he married Anne Felton. Crook died on 18 February 2020 in Eden, shortly after returning from evacuation during the 2019–20 Australian bushfire season.

== Honours ==
Crook was awarded the Clarke Medal by the Royal Society of New South Wales in 1983.

== Publications ==
- Security for Australia by Dr K.A.W. Crook (Sydney: Australian Yearly Meeting, 1970)
- The geological evolution of Australia & New Zealand by D. A. Brown, K. S. W. Campbell, K. A. W. Crook (Oxford: Pergamon Press, 1968)
- Manual of sedimentary structures by C.E.B. Conybeare and K.A.W. Crook (Canberra: Bureau of Mineral Resources, Geology and Geophysics, 1968)
- Tasman Orogen Profile by M.J. Rickard and K.A.W. Crook (Sydney : Dept. of Mineral Resources, 1985)
- The Concorde SST and Australia - problems in open assessment of specialised technology by M.C. Anderson, K.A.W. Crook and M.O. Diesendorf (Canberra : Society for Social Responsibility in Science, 1974)

Awards
Preceded by Noel Beadle	Clarke Medal; 1983	Succeeded by Mike Archer
