= Miles Bourke =

Australian farmer (1925–1982)

Miles Bourke (20 November 1925 – 13 October 1982) was an Australian farmer who served as the first president of the Victorian Farmers' Federation.

He was born in Warracknabeal to farmer Michael Thomas Bourke and Lucy, née Powell. He attended local schools and then Ballarat Grammar School. He left school in 1942 to help his mother run their farm (his father had died in 1939). He married Ida Jean Brewster on 15 July 1953, and served on Warracknabeal Shire Council from 1955 to 1976 (as president in 1959 and 1967). In 1963 he was elected to the executive of the Victorian Wheat and Wool-growers' Association (VWWGA), and he was also appointed to the Wheat Advisory Committee and the Victorian Wheat Research Foundation by the state government.

From 1965 he was a growers' representative on the Victorian Grain Elevators Board; he also served on the Australian Wheat Board and the International Labour Organization's advisory committee on rural development (1974). In 1968 he was closely involved in the merger of the VWWGA with the Australian Primary Producers' Union's Victorian division to form the Victorian Farmers' Union. In 1976 he was appointed senior vice-president of the Australian Wheat-growers' Federation, and in 1979 negotiated the amalgamation of the Victorian Farmers' Union, the Graziers' Association of Victoria and the United Dairy-farmers of Victoria. He became the first president of the resulting entity, known at first as the Victorian Farmers and Graziers Association but later as the Victorian Farmers' Federation.

Bourke continued in this role until his collapse at a wheat board meeting in 1982. He died of a dissecting aneurysm on 13 October 1982 in South Melbourne, and was buried in Warracknabeal.
