= Pensioner Power Association of Australia =

Former Australian political party

The Pensioner Power Association of Australia was a minor Australian political party that was formed in 1968 and operated in the late 1960s and early 1970s. Formed by William Whitby, it contested the 1969 federal election, the 1970 Senate election and the 1972 federal election, but found little success.
