= 1969 Australian federal election =

- 25 October 1969

All 125 seats of the House of Representatives 63 seats were needed for a majority
- Registered: 6,606,233 ▲6.66%
- Turnout: 6,273,661 (94.97%) (▼0.16 pp)
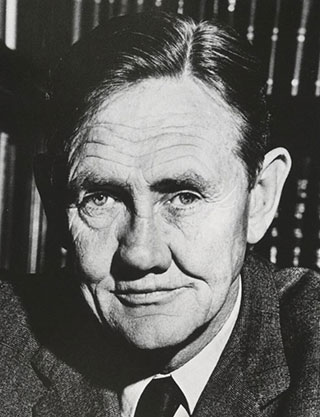

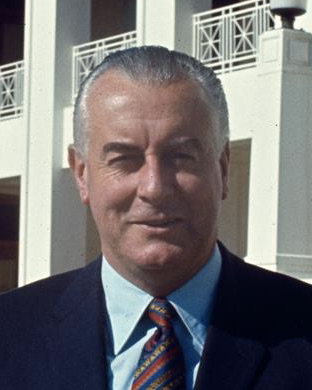
	First party	Second party
Leader	John Gorton	Gough Whitlam
Party	Liberal–Country Coalition	Labor
Leader since	10 January 1968	8 February 1967
Leader's seat	Higgins (Vic.)	Werriwa (NSW)
Last election	82 seats	41 seats
Seats won	66	59
Seat change	▼16	▲18
Primary vote	2,649,219	2,870,792
Percentage	43.33%	46.95%
Swing	▼6.65	▲6.97
TPP	49.80%	50.20%
TPP swing	▼7.10	▲7.10
- Results by division for the House of Representatives, shaded by winning party's margin of victory.
Prime Minister before election
John Gorton
Liberal/Country coalition
Subsequent Prime Minister
John Gorton
Liberal/Country coalition

A federal election was held in Australia on 25 October 1969. The incumbent Liberal–Country coalition government, led by Prime Minister John Gorton, won the election with a severely diminished majority over the opposition Labor Party, led by Gough Whitlam, despite losing the two-party-preferred vote.

Both major parties had changed their leaders in the run-up to the election, the first time this had occurred since 1946.

The victory was the ninth consecutive general election won by the Coalition, which remains the record number of consecutive terms won by any Australian federal government. There was no Senate election until the 1970 Australian Senate election.

Future Prime Minister Paul Keating entered parliament at this election.

== Issues ==
The 1969 election centred on the two leaders, John Gorton and Gough Whitlam. Both were leading their respective parties in an election for the first time. Gorton had initially been very popular and was promoted as an "average Aussie bloke". This image was boosted by his record of wartime service and his craggy, battered appearance (the result of a wartime injury). However, he gradually gained a reputation for being erratic and unnecessarily confrontational. By the time of the 1969 election campaign, his attempts to alter long-standing Liberal Party policies, with regard both to federal–state powers and to foreign affairs, had alienated the more conservative sections of the Liberal Party and various state Liberal leaders, such as Henry Bolte and Bob Askin.

Whitlam, by contrast, had reformed Labor and abandoned unpopular policies such as the once-dominant White Australia Policy, as well as the commitment to socialism still held by many members on the left of the party. He presented a sleek and modern image which was able to win over new voters to his cause with a policy platform including free university education and universal health insurance. Whitlam had also managed to restore and heal the party's image as an electable alternative, something that had been impossible after the Labor Party split in 1955. Under his leadership, Whitlam had also attracted back many Catholic voters who had previously dumped Labor due to its infighting and factionalism. In addition, although the Coalition had won the biggest majority government in Australian history in 1966, it was increasingly seen as becoming tired and unfocused after 20 years in power. There were also growing concerns over Australia's involvement in the Vietnam War. The ALP thus went into the election with a good chance of increasing its small caucus.

Despite a Coalition campaign depicting Labor as a party dominated and controlled by union bosses, the result was very close. Labor became the biggest single party in the House, taking 59 seats—an 18-seat swing from 1966. It also won a bare majority of the two-party-preferred vote, winning 50.2 percent to the Coalition's 49.8 percent—a 7.1-point swing from 1966, the largest not to have resulted in a change of government. However, largely due to the Democratic Labor Party preferencing against Labor, especially in Victoria, Whitlam came up four seats short of toppling the Coalition. Nonetheless, Whitlam recovered much of what Labor had lost in its severe defeat three years earlier, and put the party within striking distance of winning government, which it did three years later in the 1972 federal election.

== Results ==
House of Reps (IRV) — 1969–72—Turnout 94.97% (CV) — Informal 2.54%
Party	First preference votes	%	Swing	Seats	Change
Labor	2,870,792	46.95	+6.97	59	+18
Liberal–Country coalition	2,649,219	43.33	–6.65	66	–16
Liberal	2,125,987	34.77	–5.37	46	–15
Country	523,232	8.56	–1.28	20	–1
Democratic Labor	367,977	6.02	–1.29	0	0
Australia	53,646	0.88	+0.88	0	0
Pensioner Power	7,706	0.13	+0.13	0	0
Social Credit	5,156	0.08	+0.08	0	0
Communist	4,920	0.08	–0.32	0	0
Independents	141,090	2.53	+1.08	0	–1
Total	6,114,118			125	+1
Two-party-preferred (estimated)
Liberal–Country coalition	Win	49.80	–7.10	66	–16
Labor		50.20	+7.10	59	+18

First preference vote
Labor	46.95%
Liberal	34.77%
Country	8.56%
DLP	6.02%
Australia	0.88%
Independents	2.31%
Other	0.51%

Two-party-preferred vote
Labor	50.20%
Coalition	49.80%

Parliament seats
Coalition	52.80%
Labor	47.20%

== Seats changing hands ==
Seat	Pre-1969			Swing	Post-1969		
Seat	Party	Member	Margin	Swing	Margin	Member	Party
Adelaide, SA	Liberal	Andrew Jones	2.8	14.3	11.3	Chris Hurford	Labor
Barton, NSW	Liberal	Bill Arthur	2.2	5.7	3.0	Len Reynolds	Labor
Batman, Vic	Independent	Sam Benson	N/A	0.2	3.0	Horrie Garrick	Labor
Bowman, Qld	Liberal	Wylie Gibbs	6.7	7.1	2.5	Len Keogh	Labor
Eden-Monaro, NSW	Liberal	Dugald Munro	0.7	5.8	3.2	Allan Fraser	Labor
Forrest, WA	Liberal	Gordon Freeth	9.5	11.6	1.1	Frank Kirwan	Labor
Franklin, Tas	Liberal	Thomas Pearsall	2.2	9.9	5.9	Ray Sherry	Labor
Grey, SA	Liberal	Don Jessop	3.0	3.1	1.9	Laurie Wallis	Labor
Hawker, SA	Liberal	notional - new seat	N/A	13.7	7.9	Ralph Jacobi	Labor
Kingston, SA	Liberal	Kay Brownbill	8.2	16.5	3.9	Richard Gun	Labor
Lalor, Vic	Liberal	Mervyn Lee	0.7	4.8	10.9	Jim Cairns	Labor
Maribyrnong, Vic	Liberal	Philip Stokes	7.6	8.0	1.4	Moss Cass	Labor
Paterson, NSW	Liberal	Allen Fairhall	N/A	9.1	7.5	Frank O'Keefe	Country
Perth, WA	Liberal	Fred Chaney	6.9	12.2	8.2	Joe Berinson	Labor
Riverina, NSW	Country	Bill Armstrong	16.5	18.8	2.3	Al Grassby	Labor
Robertson, NSW	Liberal	William Bridges-Maxwell	8.5	9.7	1.8	Barry Cohen	Labor
St George, NSW	Liberal	Len Bosman	9.5	9.6	0.1	Bill Morrison	Labor
Sturt, SA	Liberal	Ian Wilson	16.2	15.0	0.5	Norm Foster	Labor
Swan, WA	Liberal	Richard Cleaver	3.5	8.3	4.1	Adrian Bennett	Labor

- Members listed in italics did not contest their seat at this election.

== See also ==
- 1967 Australian Senate election
- 1970 Australian Senate election
- Candidates of the Australian federal election, 1969
- Members of the Australian House of Representatives, 1969–1972
- Don's Party
