= Electoral results for the Division of St George =

Election results for federal seat of St George, New South Wales, Australia

This is a list of electoral results for the Division of St George in Australian federal elections from the division's creation in 1949 until its abolition in 1993.

== Members ==
Member	Party	Term
Bill Graham	Liberal	1949–1954
Nelson Lemmon	Labor	1954–1955
Bill Graham	Liberal	1955–1958
Lionel Clay	Labor	1958–1963
Len Bosman	Liberal	1963–1969
Bill Morrison	Labor	1969–1975
Maurice Neil	Liberal	1975–1980
Bill Morrison	Labor	1980–1984
Stephen Dubois	Labor	1984–1993

== Election results ==
=== Elections in the 1990s ===
==== 1990 ====
1990 Australian federal election: St George
Party	Candidate	Votes	%	±%
Labor	Stephen Dubois	31,064	49.3	−0.5
Liberal	Alan Smith	23,060	36.6	−6.8
Democrats	John Mukai	6,086	9.7	+4.5
Australian Gruen	Don Collingridge	1,430	2.3	+2.3
Grey Power	Brian Howard	579	0.9	+0.9
New Australia	John Brkich	417	0.7	+0.7
Democratic Socialist	Colin Hesse	392	0.6	+0.6
Total formal votes		63,028	95.1	
Informal votes		3,264	4.9	
Turnout		66,292	96.0	
Two-party-preferred result
Labor	Stephen Dubois	36,309	57.8	+4.1
Liberal	Alan Smith	26,548	42.2	−4.1
Labor hold		Swing	+4.1	

=== Elections in the 1980s ===
==== 1987 ====
1987 Australian federal election: St George
Party	Candidate	Votes	%	±%
Labor	Stephen Dubois	30,829	49.8	−3.2
Liberal	Gary Rush	26,869	43.4	+3.2
Democrats	Garry Dalrymple	3,241	5.2	+1.0
Independent	Brian Compton	927	1.5	+1.5
Total formal votes		61,866	93.9	
Informal votes		4,015	6.1	
Turnout		65,881	93.7	
Two-party-preferred result
Labor	Stephen Dubois	33,209	53.7	−2.8
Liberal	Gary Rush	28,651	46.3	+2.8
Labor hold		Swing	−2.8	

==== 1984 ====
1984 Australian federal election: St George
Party	Candidate	Votes	%	±%
Labor	Stephen Dubois	32,417	53.0	−4.7
Liberal	Bob Gemell	24,612	40.2	+3.3
Democrats	Paul Terrett	2,599	4.2	+2.3
Independent	Stanley Duncan	1,008	1.6	+1.6
Independent	Brian Compton	521	0.9	+0.9
Total formal votes		61,157	92.2	
Informal votes		5,206	7.8	
Turnout		66,363	94.6	
Two-party-preferred result
Labor	Stephen Dubois	34,560	56.5	−3.9
Liberal	Bob Gemell	26,587	43.5	+3.9
Labor hold		Swing	−3.9	

==== 1983 ====
1983 Australian federal election: St George
Party	Candidate	Votes	%	±%
Labor	Bill Morrison	37,570	57.8	+4.4
Liberal	George James	23,933	36.8	−6.0
Independent	Brian Compton	1,806	2.8	+2.8
Democrats	Ronald Kirkwood	1,210	1.9	−1.9
Socialist Workers	Dorothy Tumney	477	0.7	+0.7
Total formal votes		64,996	97.3	
Informal votes		1,809	2.7	
Turnout		66,805	95.6	
Two-party-preferred result
Labor	Bill Morrison		60.5	+4.4
Liberal	George James		39.5	−4.4
Labor hold		Swing	+4.4	

==== 1980 ====
1980 Australian federal election: St George
Party	Candidate	Votes	%	±%
Labor	Bill Morrison	34,855	53.4	+8.3
Liberal	Maurice Neil	27,946	42.8	−5.1
Democrats	Beverley Davis	2,509	3.8	−2.5
Total formal votes		65,310	97.5	
Informal votes		1,680	2.5	
Turnout		66,990	94.8	
Two-party-preferred result
Labor	Bill Morrison		56.1	+8.1
Liberal	Maurice Neil		43.9	−8.1
Labor gain from Liberal		Swing	+8.1	

=== Elections in the 1970s ===
==== 1977 ====
1977 Australian federal election: St George
Party	Candidate	Votes	%	±%
Liberal	Maurice Neil	32,078	47.9	−1.1
Labor	Tony Whitlam	30,227	45.1	−3.6
Democrats	Ronald Kirkwood	4,243	6.3	+6.3
Progress	David Kriss	441	0.7	−1.6
Total formal votes		66,989	97.4	
Informal votes		1,784	2.6	
Turnout		68,773	95.4	
Two-party-preferred result
Liberal	Maurice Neil	34,827	52.0	+2.0
Labor	Tony Whitlam	32,162	48.0	−2.0
Liberal hold		Swing	+2.0	

==== 1975 ====
1975 Australian federal election: St George
Party	Candidate	Votes	%	±%
Liberal	Maurice Neil	28,371	49.0	+5.4
Labor	Bill Morrison	28,203	48.7	−6.3
Workers	Keith Gleeson	1,338	2.3	+2.3
Total formal votes		57,912	98.3	
Informal votes		1,006	1.7	
Turnout		58,918	96.2	
Two-party-preferred result
Liberal	Maurice Neil	28,984	50.0	+5.8
Labor	Bill Morrison	28,928	50.0	−5.8
Liberal gain from Labor		Swing	+5.8	

==== 1974 ====
1974 Australian federal election: St George
Party	Candidate	Votes	%	±%
Labor	Bill Morrison	31,121	55.0	+2.0
Liberal	Brian Booth	24,696	43.6	+2.5
Australia	Harry Jagers	788	1.4	−0.8
Total formal votes		56,605	98.4	
Informal votes		931	1.6	
Turnout		57,536	95.7	
Two-party-preferred result
Labor	Bill Morrison		55.8	+0.8
Liberal	Brian Booth		44.2	−0.8
Labor hold		Swing	+0.8	

==== 1972 ====
1972 Australian federal election: St George
Party	Candidate	Votes	%	±%
Labor	Bill Morrison	28,384	53.0	+4.8
Liberal	Len Bosman	22,013	41.1	−5.1
Democratic Labor	Doris Allison	1,754	3.3	−0.1
Australia	Christopher Owens	1,165	2.2	+0.8
Independent	Charles Bellchambers	206	0.4	+0.4
Total formal votes		53,522	97.8	
Informal votes		1,200	2.2	
Turnout		54,722	96.4	
Two-party-preferred result
Labor	Bill Morrison		55.0	+4.9
Liberal	Len Bosman		45.0	−4.9
Labor hold		Swing	+4.9	

=== Elections in the 1960s ===
==== 1969 ====
1969 Australian federal election: St George
Party	Candidate	Votes	%	±%
Labor	Bill Morrison	25,918	48.2	+10.2
Liberal	Len Bosman	24,822	46.2	−8.3
Democratic Labor	Henry Bader	1,805	3.4	−0.8
Australia	Christopher Owens	741	1.4	+1.4
Independent	Archibald Lawless	249	0.5	+0.5
Independent	Emanuel Said	198	0.4	+0.4
Total formal votes		53,733	96.7	
Informal votes		1,838	3.3	
Turnout		55,571	95.4	
Two-party-preferred result
Labor	Bill Morrison	26,901	50.1	+9.6
Liberal	Len Bosman	26,832	49.9	−9.6
Labor gain from Liberal		Swing	+9.6	

==== 1966 ====
1966 Australian federal election: St George
Party	Candidate	Votes	%	±%
Liberal	Len Bosman	22,091	54.5	+4.4
Labor	Malcolm Cameron	15,406	38.0	−9.1
Democratic Labor	Hans Andreasson	1,713	4.2	+1.4
Liberal Reform Group	John Mant	1,304	3.2	+3.2
Total formal votes		40,514	97.1	
Informal votes		1,229	2.9	
Turnout		41,743	95.9	
Two-party-preferred result
Liberal	Len Bosman		59.5	+7.2
Labor	Malcolm Cameron		40.5	−7.2
Liberal hold		Swing	+7.2	

==== 1963 ====
1963 Australian federal election: St George
Party	Candidate	Votes	%	±%
Liberal	Len Bosman	20,869	50.1	+7.7
Labor	Lionel Clay	19,648	47.1	−7.1
Democratic Labor	John Vandergriff	1,169	2.8	−0.7
Total formal votes		41,686	98.6	
Informal votes		597	1.4	
Turnout		42,283	96.8	
Two-party-preferred result
Liberal	Len Bosman		52.3	+7.2
Labor	Lionel Clay		47.7	−7.2
Liberal gain from Labor		Swing	+7.2	

==== 1961 ====
1961 Australian federal election: St George
Party	Candidate	Votes	%	±%
Labor	Lionel Clay	22,468	54.2	+5.1
Liberal	Clifford Amos	17,580	42.4	−4.7
Democratic Labor	Malcolm Towner	1,433	3.5	−0.3
Total formal votes		41,481	97.7	
Informal votes		978	2.3	
Turnout		42,459	95.9	
Two-party-preferred result
Labor	Lionel Clay		54.9	+4.8
Liberal	Clifford Amos		45.1	−4.8
Labor hold		Swing	+4.8	

=== Elections in the 1950s ===
==== 1958 ====
1958 Australian federal election: St George
Party	Candidate	Votes	%	±%
Labor	Lionel Clay	20,532	49.1	+1.5
Liberal	Bill Graham	19,675	47.1	−5.3
Democratic Labor	Mary Nappa	1,590	3.8	+3.8
Total formal votes		41,797	97.3	
Informal votes		1,151	2.7	
Turnout		42,948	96.7	
Two-party-preferred result
Labor	Lionel Clay	20,928	50.1	+2.5
Liberal	Bill Graham	20,869	49.9	−2.5
Labor gain from Liberal		Swing	+2.5	

==== 1955 ====
1955 Australian federal election: St George
Party	Candidate	Votes	%	±%
Liberal	Bill Graham	22,171	52.4	+5.8
Labor	Nelson Lemmon	20,142	47.6	−5.8
Total formal votes		42,313	97.6	
Informal votes		1,007	2.3	
Turnout		43,320	96.7	
Liberal gain from Labor		Swing	+5.8	

==== 1954 ====
1954 Australian federal election: St George
Party	Candidate	Votes	%	±%
Labor	Nelson Lemmon	20,173	52.7	+4.3
Liberal	Bill Graham	18,084	47.3	−4.3
Total formal votes		38,257	98.9	
Informal votes		434	1.1	
Turnout		38,691	97.0	
Labor gain from Liberal		Swing	+4.3	

==== 1951 ====
1951 Australian federal election: St George
Party	Candidate	Votes	%	±%
Liberal	Bill Graham	19,890	51.6	−0.4
Labor	Nelson Lemmon	18,670	48.4	+0.4
Total formal votes		38,560	98.3	
Informal votes		654	1.7	
Turnout		39,214	97.0	
Liberal hold		Swing	−0.4	

=== Elections in the 1940s ===
==== 1949 ====
1949 Australian federal election: St George
Party	Candidate	Votes	%	±%
Liberal	Bill Graham	19,987	52.0	+17.2
Labor	Joseph Nicholson	18,475	48.0	−12.1
Total formal votes		38,462	97.8	
Informal votes		847	2.2	
Turnout		39,309	97.3	
Liberal notional gain from Labor		Swing	+16.2	
