= 1963 Australian House of Representatives election =

This is a list of electoral division results for the Australian 1963 federal election.

== Overall ==
House of Reps (IRV) – 1963–66—Turnout 95.73% (CV) – Informal 1.82%
Party	Votes	%	Swing	Seats	Change
Liberal–Country coalition	2,520,321	46.04	+3.95	72	+10
Liberal	2,030,823	37.09	+3.51	52	+7
Country	489,498	8.94	+0.43	20	+3
Labor	2,489,184	45.47	–2.43	52 (Note: Including Northern Territory and Australian Capital Territory)	–10
Democratic Labor	407,416	7.44	–1.27	0	0
Communist	32,053	0.59	+0.11	0	0
Independents	25,739	0.47	–0.21	0	0
Total	5,474,713			122	
Two-party-preferred (estimated)
Liberal–Country coalition	Win	52.60	+3.10	72	+10
Labor		47.40	–3.10	50	–10

See 1961 Australian federal election and 1964 Australian Senate election for Senate compositions.

Popular vote
Labor	45.47%
Liberal	37.09%
Country	8.94%
DLP	7.44%
Communist	0.59%
Independents	0.47%

Two-party-preferred vote (estimated)
Coalition	52.60%
Labor	47.40%

Parliament seats
Coalition	59.02%
Labor	40.98%

== New South Wales ==
1963 Australian federal election (New South Wales)
← 1961	30 November 1963	1966 →

All 46 NSW seats in the House of Representatives 23 seats needed for a majority
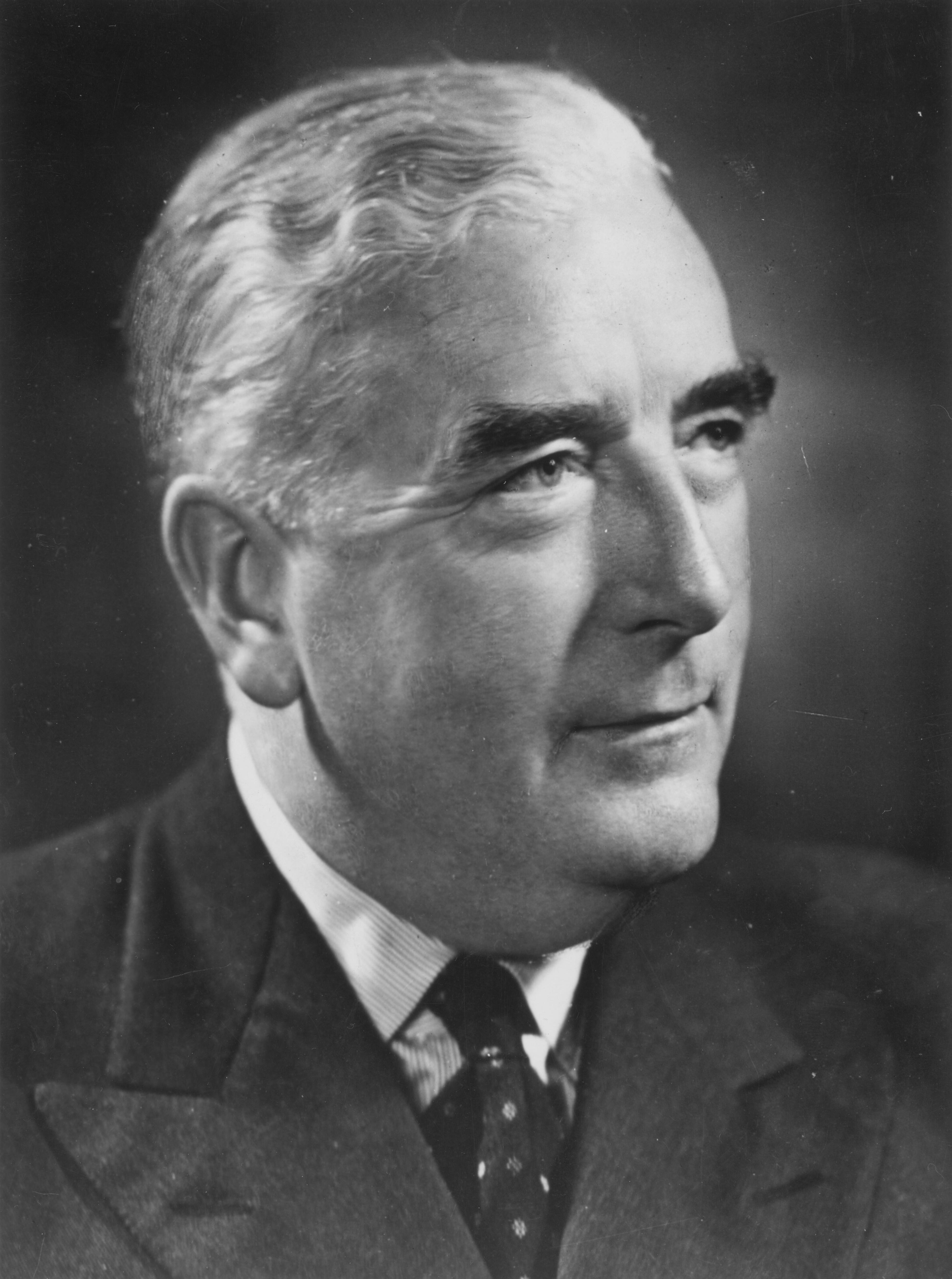

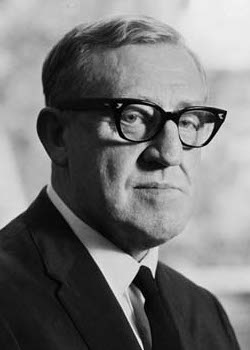
	First party	Second party
Leader	Robert Menzies	Arthur Calwell
Party	Coalition	Labor
Seats before	19	27
Seats won	26	20
Seat change	▲7	▼7
Popular vote	970,132	987,228
Percentage	46.7%	47.6%
Swing	▲6.3pp	▼4.6pp
TPP	50.7%	49.3%
TPP swing	▲5.5pp	▼5.5pp

=== Banks ===
1963 Australian federal election: Banks
Party	Candidate	Votes	%	±%
Labor	Eric Costa	33,175	56.2	−1.9
Liberal	Milovan Kovjanic	23,014	39.0	+12.9
Communist	Pat Clancy	2,885	4.9	+3.2
Total formal votes		59,074	98.3	
Informal votes		1,009	1.7	
Turnout		60,083	96.4	
Two-party-preferred result
Labor	Eric Costa		60.7	−5.3
Liberal	Milovan Kovjanic		39.3	+5.3
Labor hold		Swing	−5.3	

=== Barton ===
1963 Australian federal election: Barton
Party	Candidate	Votes	%	±%
Labor	Len Reynolds	22,889	50.0	−7.2
Liberal	Jack Manning	21,394	46.7	+9.2
Democratic Labor	Norma Boyle	1,508	3.3	−2.0
Total formal votes		45,791	98.9	
Informal votes		511	1.1	
Turnout		46,302	96.7	
Two-party-preferred result
Labor	Len Reynolds	23,201	50.7	−8.4
Liberal	Jack Manning	22,590	49.3	+8.4
Labor hold		Swing	−8.4	

=== Bennelong ===
1963 Australian federal election: Bennelong
Party	Candidate	Votes	%	±%
Liberal	John Cramer	29,947	57.5	+12.1
Labor	William Baird	19,462	37.3	−10.8
Democratic Labor	Allan Dwyer	2,422	4.6	−1.9
New Guinea	Joseph Woodhouse	296	0.6	+0.6
Total formal votes		52,127	98.5	
Informal votes		792	1.5	
Turnout		52,919	95.5	
Two-party-preferred result
Liberal	John Cramer		61.5	+10.7
Labor	William Baird		38.5	−10.7
Liberal hold		Swing	+10.7	

=== Blaxland ===
1963 Australian federal election: Blaxland
Party	Candidate	Votes	%	±%
Labor	Jim Harrison	27,558	61.0	−5.3
Liberal	Terence Morrish	14,741	32.6	+7.2
Democratic Labor	Kevin Davis	2,883	6.4	−2.0
Total formal votes		45,182	98.1	
Informal votes		894	1.9	
Turnout		46,076	95.5	
Two-party-preferred result
Labor	Jim Harrison		63.1	−4.7
Liberal	Terence Morrish		36.9	+4.7
Labor hold		Swing	−4.7	

=== Bradfield ===
1963 Australian federal election: Bradfield
Party	Candidate	Votes	%	±%
Liberal	Harry Turner	41,831	78.0	+6.6
Labor	Lawrence McCulloch	8,575	16.0	−4.8
Democratic Labor	Dominique Droulers	3,245	6.0	−1.8
Total formal votes		53,651	98.9	
Informal votes		601	1.1	
Turnout		54,252	95.0	
Two-party-preferred result
Liberal	Harry Turner		82.0	+5.2
Labor	Lawrence McCulloch		18.0	−5.2
Liberal hold		Swing	+5.2	

=== Calare ===
1963 Australian federal election: Calare
Party	Candidate	Votes	%	±%
Country	John England	21,690	54.3	+4.3
Labor	Leroy Serisier	14,933	37.4	−4.2
Democratic Labor	George Boland	3,289	8.2	−0.1
Total formal votes		39,912	99.2	
Informal votes		311	0.8	
Turnout		40,223	95.8	
Two-party-preferred result
Country	John England		61.1	+4.2
Labor	Leroy Serisier		38.9	−4.2
Country hold		Swing	+4.2	

=== Cowper ===
1963 Australian federal election: Cowper
Party	Candidate	Votes	%	±%
Country	Ian Robinson	20,556	53.0	+13.1
Labor	Frank McGuren	18,237	47.0	+1.1
Total formal votes		38,793	99.4	
Informal votes		240	0.6	
Turnout		39,033	96.9	
Country gain from Labor		Swing	+4.8	

=== Cunningham ===
1963 Australian federal election: Cunningham
Party	Candidate	Votes	%	±%
Labor	Rex Connor	31,905	58.4	−3.6
Liberal	Jack Hough	20,900	38.2	+3.9
Communist	Bill McDougall	1,836	3.4	−0.3
Total formal votes		54,641	97.5	
Informal votes		1,390	2.5	
Turnout		56,031	95.4	
Two-party-preferred result
Labor	Rex Connor		61.5	−3.8
Liberal	Jack Hough		38.5	+3.8
Labor hold		Swing	−3.8	

=== Dalley ===
1963 Australian federal election: Dalley
Party	Candidate	Votes	%	±%
Labor	William O'Connor	24,553	72.9	+1.9
Democratic Labor	Peter Keogh	9,118	27.1	+20.2
Total formal votes		33,671	96.2	
Informal votes		1,333	3.8	
Turnout		35,004	93.6	
Labor hold		Swing	−2.4	

=== Darling ===
1963 Australian federal election: Darling
Party	Candidate	Votes	%	±%
Labor	Joe Clark	23,352	67.4	−5.2
Country	Frederick Harding	11,299	32.6	+5.2
Total formal votes		34,651	98.8	
Informal votes		424	1.2	
Turnout		35,075	93.2	
Labor hold		Swing	−5.2	

=== East Sydney ===
1963 Australian federal election: East Sydney
Party	Candidate	Votes	%	±%
Labor	Len Devine	19,779	61.2	−6.6
Liberal	William Foster	10,711	33.1	+11.1
Communist	Bill Brown	1,827	5.7	+2.5
Total formal votes		32,317	97.3	
Informal votes		885	2.7	
Turnout		33,202	91.8	
Two-party-preferred result
Labor	Len Devine		66.4	−5.5
Liberal	William Foster		33.6	+5.5
Labor hold		Swing	−5.5	

=== Eden-Monaro ===
1963 Australian federal election: Eden-Monaro
Party	Candidate	Votes	%	±%
Labor	Allan Fraser	20,807	51.0	−9.0
Liberal	Dugald Munro	18,095	44.3	+4.3
Democratic Labor	John Donohue	1,924	4.7	+4.7
Total formal votes		40,826	98.7	
Informal votes		525	1.3	
Turnout		41,351	96.2	
Two-party-preferred result
Labor	Allan Fraser		52.7	−7.3
Liberal	Dugald Munro		47.3	+7.3
Labor hold		Swing	−7.3	

=== Evans ===
1963 Australian federal election: Evans
Party	Candidate	Votes	%	±%
Liberal	Malcolm Mackay	19,306	51.1	+5.0
Labor	James Monaghan	15,863	42.0	−3.3
Democratic Labor	Jack Kane	2,263	6.0	−0.8
Independent	Harold O'Reilly	187	0.5	+0.5
Independent	Stanislaus Kelly	177	0.5	+0.5
Total formal votes		37,796	97.8	
Informal votes		847	2.2	
Turnout		38,643	95.8	
Two-party-preferred result
Liberal	Malcolm Mackay		56.6	+6.7
Labor	James Monaghan		43.4	−6.7
Liberal gain from Labor		Swing	+6.7	

=== Farrer ===
1963 Australian federal election: Farrer
Party	Candidate	Votes	%	±%
Liberal	David Fairbairn	24,744	58.9	+3.2
Labor	Herb McPherson	13,341	31.8	−2.3
Democratic Labor	Lawrence Esler	3,901	9.3	−1.0
Total formal votes		41,986	99.1	
Informal votes		384	0.9	
Turnout		42,370	96.4	
Two-party-preferred result
Liberal	David Fairbairn		66.5	+2.4
Labor	Herb McPherson		33.5	−2.4
Liberal hold		Swing	+2.4	

=== Grayndler ===
1963 Australian federal election: Grayndler
Party	Candidate	Votes	%	±%
Labor	Fred Daly	21,053	64.5	−2.7
Liberal	Robert Leech	10,684	32.8	+9.1
Communist	Mary Stevens	885	2.7	−4.3
Total formal votes		32,622	97.4	
Informal votes		864	2.6	
Turnout		33,486	94.6	
Two-party-preferred result
Labor	Fred Daly		66.9	−7.1
Liberal	Robert Leech		33.1	+7.1
Labor hold		Swing	−7.1	

=== Gwydir ===
1963 Australian federal election: Gwydir
Party	Candidate	Votes	%	±%
Country	Ian Allan	22,477	55.0	+4.9
Labor	Kenneth Green	18,373	45.0	−0.1
Total formal votes		40,850	99.2	
Informal votes		311	0.8	
Turnout		41,161	94.9	
Country hold		Swing	+1.1	

=== Hughes ===
1963 Australian federal election: Hughes
Party	Candidate	Votes	%	±%
Labor	Les Johnson	35,726	52.1	−7.1
Liberal	William Cover	30,751	44.8	+9.1
Democratic Labor	George Apap	1,665	2.4	−2.7
New Guinea	John Phillips	269	0.4	+0.4
Independent	John Mantova	200	0.3	+0.3
Total formal votes		68,611	98.4	
Informal votes		1,148	1.6	
Turnout		69,759	96.3	
Two-party-preferred result
Labor	Les Johnson		52.7	−8.3
Liberal	William Cover		47.3	+8.3
Labor hold		Swing	−8.3	

=== Hume ===
1963 Australian federal election: Hume
Party	Candidate	Votes	%	±%
Labor	Arthur Fuller	37,931	46.1	−2.5
Country	Ian Pettitt	11,078	28.5	−14.5
Liberal	Geoffrey Ashton	7,299	18.8	+18.8
Democratic Labor	Charles Rowe	2,574	6.6	−1.7
Total formal votes		38,882	99.0	
Informal votes		408	1.0	
Turnout		39,290	97.0	
Two-party-preferred result
Country	Ian Pettitt	19,746	50.8	+1.7
Labor	Arthur Fuller	19,136	49.2	−1.7
Country gain from Labor		Swing	+1.7	

=== Hunter ===
1963 Australian federal election: Hunter
Party	Candidate	Votes	%	±%
Labor	Bert James	32,132	71.1	−4.4
Liberal	John Wassell	7,555	16.7	−2.1
Democratic Labor	Aubrey Barr	3,389	7.5	+7.5
Communist	Evan Phillips	2,103	4.7	−1.0
Total formal votes		45,179	97.9	
Informal votes		976	2.1	
Turnout		46,155	96.3	
Two-party-preferred result
Labor	Bert James		77.6	−3.0
Liberal	John Wassell		22.4	+3.0
Labor hold		Swing	−3.0	

=== Kingsford Smith ===
1963 Australian federal election: Kingsford-Smith
Party	Candidate	Votes	%	±%
Labor	Dan Curtin	24,083	54.8	−3.1
Liberal	Sidney Pitkethly	18,108	41.2	+6.4
Communist	Jim Baird	1,729	3.9	+3.9
Total formal votes		43,920	98.0	
Informal votes		913	2.0	
Turnout		44,833	94.6	
Two-party-preferred result
Labor	Dan Curtin		58.4	−1.0
Liberal	Sidney Pitkethly		41.6	+1.0
Labor hold		Swing	−1.0	

=== Lang ===
1963 Australian federal election: Lang
Party	Candidate	Votes	%	±%
Labor	Frank Stewart	25,182	57.2	−6.8
Liberal	Russell Carter	17,208	39.1	+10.3
Independent	Frank Ball	1,626	3.7	+3.7
Total formal votes		44,016	98.5	
Informal votes		671	1.5	
Turnout		44,687	95.6	
Two-party-preferred result
Labor	Frank Stewart		58.6	−7.7
Liberal	Russell Carter		41.4	+7.7
Labor hold		Swing	−7.7	

=== Lawson ===
1963 Australian federal election: Lawson
Party	Candidate	Votes	%	±%
Country	Laurie Failes	20,991	53.0	+5.1
Labor	John Canobi	16,659	42.0	−4.4
Democratic Labor	Mario Morandini	1,972	5.0	−0.7
Total formal votes		39,622	99.2	
Informal votes		319	0.8	
Turnout		39,941	95.5	
Two-party-preferred result
Country	Laurie Failes		57.0	+4.9
Labor	John Canobi		43.0	−4.9
Country hold		Swing	+4.9	

=== Lowe ===
1963 Australian federal election: Lowe
Party	Candidate	Votes	%	±%
Liberal	William McMahon	21,714	55.6	+7.8
Labor	John Holland	15,426	39.5	−7.8
Democratic Labor	Reginald Lawson	1,910	4.9	+1.0
Total formal votes		39,050	98.8	
Informal votes		483	1.2	
Turnout		39,533	94.8	
Two-party-preferred result
Liberal	William McMahon		59.5	+8.6
Labor	John Holland		40.5	−8.6
Liberal hold		Swing	+8.6	

=== Lyne ===
1963 Australian federal election: Lyne
Party	Candidate	Votes	%	±%
Country	Philip Lucock	25,869	61.5	+7.1
Labor	John Allan	15,039	35.7	−3.5
Independent	Joe Cordner	1,181	2.8	+0.8
Total formal votes		42,089	99.1	
Informal votes		393	0.9	
Turnout		42,482	96.0	
Two-party-preferred result
Country	Philip Lucock		62.9	+3.9
Labor	John Allan		37.1	−3.9
Country hold		Swing	+3.9	

=== Macarthur ===
1963 Australian federal election: Macarthur
Party	Candidate	Votes	%	±%
Liberal	Jeff Bate	31,720	54.6	+1.6
Labor	Don Nilon	24,021	41.4	−5.6
Democratic Labor	Albert Perish	309	3.5	+3.5
Independent	Ronald Sarina	309	0.5	+0.5
Total formal votes		58,071	98.7	
Informal votes		749	1.3	
Turnout		58,820	95.3	
Two-party-preferred result
Liberal	Jeff Bate		57.7	+4.7
Labor	Don Nilon		42.3	−4.7
Liberal hold		Swing	+4.7	

=== Mackellar ===
1963 Australian federal election: Mackellar
Party	Candidate	Votes	%	±%
Liberal	Bill Wentworth	37,827	62.2	+8.1
Labor	Mabel Elliott	18,440	30.3	−4.6
Democratic Labor	Philip Cohen	2,725	4.5	−1.0
Communist	Hugh Begg	1,834	3.0	−2.5
Total formal votes		60,826	98.3	
Informal votes		1,055	1.7	
Turnout		61,881	94.8	
Two-party-preferred result
Liberal	Bill Wentworth		66.1	+7.2
Labor	Mabel Elliott		33.9	−7.2
Liberal hold		Swing	+7.2	

=== Macquarie ===
1963 Australian federal election: Macquarie
Party	Candidate	Votes	%	±%
Labor	Tony Luchetti	25,649	57.6	−5.5
Liberal	John Heesh	18,868	42.4	+10.4
Total formal votes		44,517	98.7	
Informal votes		597	1.3	
Turnout		45,114	95.9	
Labor hold		Swing	−6.5	

=== Mitchell ===
1963 Australian federal election: Mitchell
Party	Candidate	Votes	%	±%
Liberal	Les Irwin	29,230	49.3	+6.4
Labor	John Armitage	35,301	44.4	−7.8
Democratic Labor	Malcolm Towner	2,943	3.7	−0.6
New Guinea	Albert Ackerman	1,604	2.0	+2.0
Independent	John Ashe	438	0.6	+0.6
Total formal votes		79,516	97.6	
Informal votes		1,976	2.4	
Turnout		81,492	94.6	
Two-party-preferred result
Liberal	Les Irwin	42,226	53.1	+6.5
Labor	John Armitage	37,290	46.9	−6.5
Liberal gain from Labor		Swing	+6.5	

=== New England ===
1963 Australian federal election: New England
Party	Candidate	Votes	%	±%
Country	Ian Sinclair	22,027	54.7	+0.9
Labor	Donald White	16,930	42.1	+1.4
Independent	James Gordon	959	2.4	+2.4
Independent	Andrew Monley	331	0.8	+0.8
Total formal votes		40,247	98.7	
Informal votes		514	1.3	
Turnout		40,761	95.8	
Two-party-preferred result
Country	Ian Sinclair		57.3	−1.1
Labor	Donald White		42.7	+1.1
Country hold		Swing	−1.1	

=== Newcastle ===
1963 Australian federal election: Newcastle
Party	Candidate	Votes	%	±%
Labor	Charles Jones	21,434	58.7	−4.1
Liberal	Eric Cupit	12,518	34.3	+6.1
Democratic Labor	Jack Collins	2,559	7.0	−2.0
Total formal votes		36,511	98.4	
Informal votes		597	1.6	
Turnout		37,108	95.9	
Two-party-preferred result
Labor	Charles Jones		59.9	−5.5
Liberal	Eric Cupit		40.1	+5.5
Labor hold		Swing	+1.9	

=== North Sydney ===
1963 Australian federal election: North Sydney
Party	Candidate	Votes	%	±%
Liberal	William Jack	22,492	59.3	+9.6
Labor	Maurice Isaacs	13,417	35.4	−5.5
Democratic Labor	Michael Fitzpatrick	2,035	5.4	−4.0
Total formal votes		37,944	98.5	
Informal votes		575	1.5	
Turnout		38,519	94.1	
Two-party-preferred result
Liberal	William Jack		62.8	+8.8
Labor	Maurice Isaacs		37.2	−8.8
Liberal hold		Swing	+8.8	

=== Parkes ===
1963 Australian federal election: Parkes
Party	Candidate	Votes	%	±%
Liberal	Tom Hughes	18,437	47.7	+9.8
Labor	Les Haylen	17,900	46.3	−6.2
Democratic Labor	Vincent Couch	2,331	6.0	−3.6
Total formal votes		38,668	98.3	
Informal votes		676	1.7	
Turnout		39,344	95.6	
Two-party-preferred result
Liberal	Tom Hughes	19,994	51.7	+5.9
Labor	Les Haylen	18,674	48.3	−5.9
Liberal gain from Labor		Swing	+5.9	

=== Parramatta ===
1963 Australian federal election: Parramatta
Party	Candidate	Votes	%	±%
Liberal	Sir Garfield Barwick	31,660	56.0	+5.9
Labor	Maxwell McLaren	21,791	38.5	−4.3
Democratic Labor	Edward Beck	3,088	5.5	−0.1
Total formal votes		56,539	98.9	
Informal votes		602	1.1	
Turnout		57,141	95.7	
Two-party-preferred result
Liberal	Sir Garfield Barwick		60.4	+5.4
Labor	Maxwell McLaren		39.6	−5.4
Liberal hold		Swing	+5.4	

=== Paterson ===
1963 Australian federal election: Paterson
Party	Candidate	Votes	%	±%
Liberal	Allen Fairhall	24,695	61.4	+10.5
Labor	Archibald Jones	15,503	38.6	−4.2
Total formal votes		40,198	99.0	
Informal votes		396	1.0	
Turnout		40,594	96.6	
Liberal hold		Swing	+6.3	

=== Phillip ===
1963 Australian federal election: Phillip
Party	Candidate	Votes	%	±%
Liberal	William Aston	18,128	47.7	+3.6
Labor	Syd Einfeld	17,634	46.4	−3.9
Democratic Labor	John Antill	2,215	5.8	+0.3
Total formal votes		37,977	98.3	
Informal votes		664	1.7	
Turnout		38,641	94.6	
Two-party-preferred result
Liberal	William Aston	20,048	52.8	+4.2
Labor	Syd Einfeld	17,929	47.2	−4.2
Liberal gain from Labor		Swing	+4.2	

=== Reid ===
1963 Australian federal election: Reid
Party	Candidate	Votes	%	±%
Labor	Tom Uren	32,497	58.3	−7.8
Liberal	Thomas Reeves	17,667	31.7	+9.0
Democratic Labor	Mick Carroll	5,547	10.0	−1.2
Total formal votes		55,711	97.8	
Informal votes		1,276	2.2	
Turnout		56,987	95.3	
Two-party-preferred result
Labor	Tom Uren		60.1	−8.0
Liberal	Thomas Reeves		39.9	+8.0
Labor hold		Swing	−8.0	

=== Richmond ===
1963 Australian federal election: Richmond
Party	Candidate	Votes	%	±%
Country	Doug Anthony	26,389	66.2	−2.3
Labor	Matthew Walsh	12,841	32.2	−3.9
Independent	Peter Bray	607	1.5	+1.5
Total formal votes		39,837	99.4	
Informal votes		236	0.6	
Turnout		40,073	95.5	
Two-party-preferred result
Country	Doug Anthony		67.0	+3.1
Labor	Matthew Walsh		33.0	−3.1
Country hold		Swing	+3.1	

=== Riverina ===
1963 Australian federal election: Riverina
Party	Candidate	Votes	%	±%
Country	Hugh Roberton	21,068	51.7	+3.9
Labor	Jack Ward	16,969	41.6	−3.1
Democratic Labor	Victor Groutsch	2,733	6.7	−0.9
Total formal votes		40,770	98.8	
Informal votes		506	1.2	
Turnout		41,276	94.7	
Two-party-preferred result
Country	Hugh Roberton		57.3	+3.2
Labor	Jack Ward		42.7	−3.2
Country hold		Swing	+3.2	

=== Robertson ===
1963 Australian federal election: Robertson
Party	Candidate	Votes	%	±%
Liberal	Roger Dean	27,474	50.5	+2.0
Labor	Bob Brown	24,224	44.5	−2.5
Democratic Labor	George Britton	2,717	5.0	+0.5
Total formal votes		54,415	99.0	
Informal votes		574	1.0	
Turnout		54,989	95.5	
Two-party-preferred result
Liberal	Roger Dean		54.1	+2.6
Labor	Bob Brown		45.9	−2.6
Liberal hold		Swing	+2.6	

=== Shortland ===
1963 Australian federal election: Shortland
Party	Candidate	Votes	%	±%
Labor	Charles Griffiths	32,270	60.6	−4.2
Liberal	William Gilchrist	14,535	27.3	+2.9
Democratic Labor	Robert Burke	4,922	9.2	+1.0
Communist	Barbara Curthoys	1,538	2.9	+0.2
Total formal votes		53,265	98.3	
Informal votes		925	1.7	
Turnout		54,190	97.3	
Two-party-preferred result
Labor	Charles Griffiths		64.9	−4.7
Liberal	William Gilchrist		35.1	+4.7
Labor hold		Swing	−4.7	

=== St George ===
1963 Australian federal election: St George
Party	Candidate	Votes	%	±%
Liberal	Len Bosman	20,869	50.1	+7.7
Labor	Lionel Clay	19,648	47.1	−7.1
Democratic Labor	John Vandergriff	1,169	2.8	−0.7
Total formal votes		41,686	98.6	
Informal votes		597	1.4	
Turnout		42,283	96.8	
Two-party-preferred result
Liberal	Len Bosman		52.3	+7.2
Labor	Lionel Clay		47.7	−7.2
Liberal gain from Labor		Swing	+7.2	

=== Warringah ===
1963 Australian federal election: Warringah
Party	Candidate	Votes	%	±%
Liberal	John Cockle	31,478	72.5	+18.9
Labor	John Lancaster	9,964	22.9	−0.2
Democratic Labor	John Plunkett	1,975	4.5	−0.2
Total formal votes		43,417	98.6	
Informal votes		603	1.4	
Turnout		44,020	93.6	
Two-party-preferred result
Liberal	John Cockle		76.1	+10.0
Labor	John Lancaster		23.9	−10.0
Liberal hold		Swing	+10.0	

=== Watson ===
1963 Australian federal election: Watson
Party	Candidate	Votes	%	±%
Labor	Jim Cope	24,280	68.1	−12.0
Liberal	Louis Mamo	8,302	23.3	+6.4
Democratic Labor	Bernard Atkinson	2,136	6.0	+3.0
Communist	Harry Hatfield	951	2.7	+2.7
Total formal votes		35,669	96.9	
Informal votes		1,143	3.1	
Turnout		36,812	93.9	
Two-party-preferred result
Labor	Jim Cope		72.5	−8.2
Liberal	Louis Mamo		27.5	+8.2
Labor hold		Swing	−8.2	

=== Wentworth ===
1963 Australian federal election: Wentworth
Party	Candidate	Votes	%	±%
Liberal	Les Bury	27,485	73.1	+10.6
Labor	Nell Simpson	8,991	23.9	−4.6
Independent	Arthur Bergman	1,140	3.0	+3.0
Total formal votes		37,616	98.0	
Informal votes		763	2.0	
Turnout		38,379	93.1	
Two-party-preferred result
Liberal	Les Bury		75.1	+5.2
Labor	Nell Simpson		24.9	−5.2
Liberal hold		Swing	+5.2	

=== Werriwa ===
1963 Australian federal election: Werriwa
Party	Candidate	Votes	%	±%
Labor	Gough Whitlam	39,440	58.1	−7.2
Liberal	Kevin Byrne	25,301	37.3	+11.2
Democratic Labor	Harry Cole	3,115	4.6	−4.1
Total formal votes		67,856	97.4	
Informal votes		1,803	2.6	
Turnout		69,659	94.9	
Two-party-preferred result
Labor	Gough Whitlam		59.0	−7.8
Liberal	Kevin Byrne		41.0	+7.8
Labor hold		Swing	−7.8	

=== West Sydney ===
1963 Australian federal election: West Sydney
Party	Candidate	Votes	%	±%
Labor	Dan Minogue	22,051	74.3	+3.9
Democratic Labor	William Doherty	5,352	18.0	+8.6
Independent	Maurice Law	1,464	4.9	+4.9
New Guinea	Charles Kilduff	813	2.7	+2.7
Total formal votes		29,680	95.6	
Informal votes		1,371	4.4	
Turnout		31,051	89.9	
Two-party-preferred result
Labor	Dan Minogue		78.1	+7.7
Democratic Labor	William Doherty		21.9	+21.9
Labor hold		Swing	+7.7	

== Victoria ==
1963 Australian federal election (Victoria)
← 1961	30 November 1963	1966 →

All 33 Victorian seats in the House of Representatives 17 seats needed for a majority
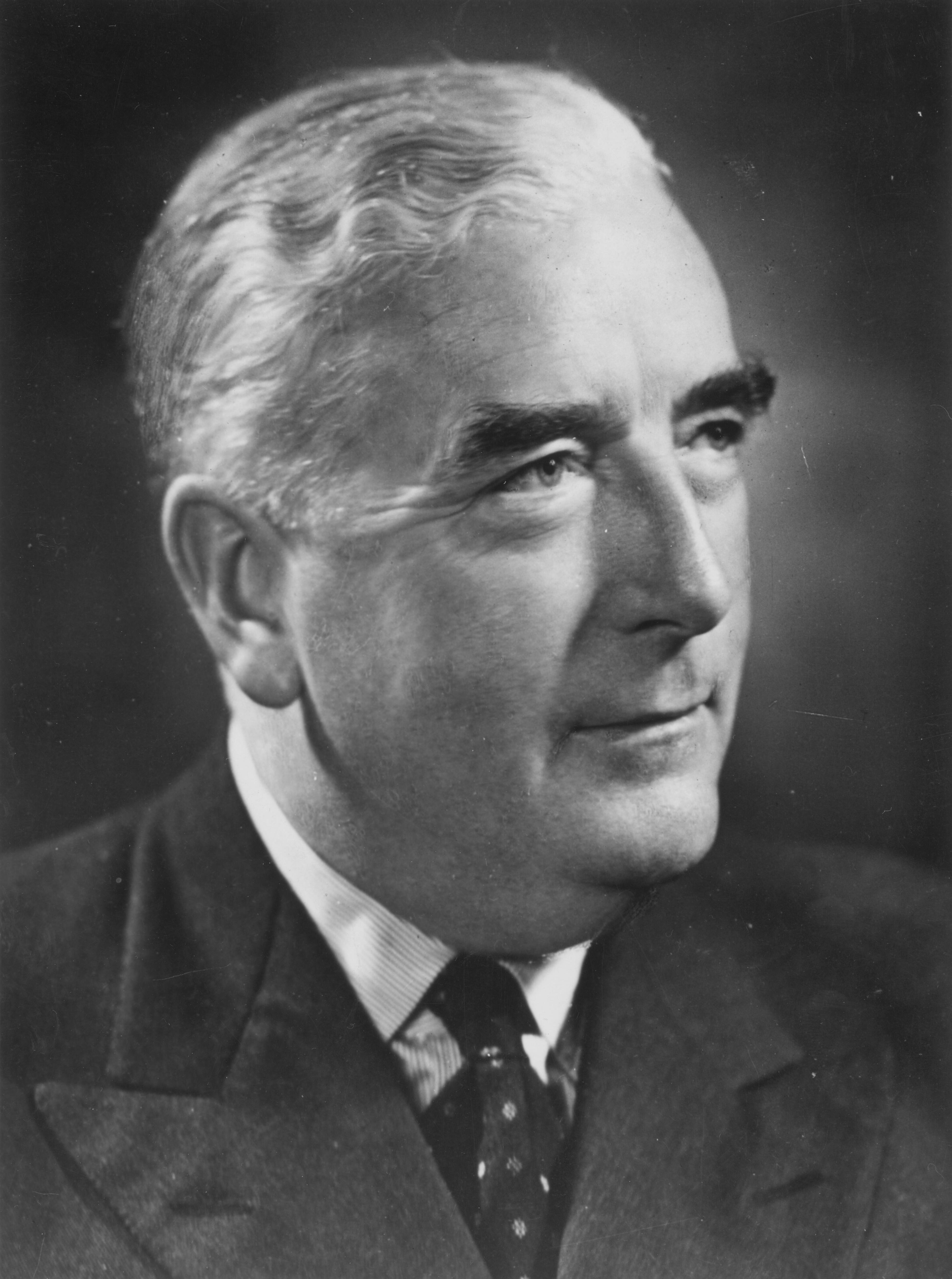

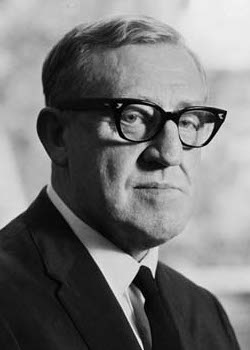
	First party	Second party
Leader	Robert Menzies	Arthur Calwell
Party	Coalition	Labor
Seats before	23	10
Seats won	23	10
Seat change	Steady	Steady
Popular vote	717,097	620,253
Percentage	46.7%	40.4%
Swing	▲4.4pp	▼1.2pp
TPP	57.5%	42.5%
TPP swing	▲2.0pp	▼2.0pp

=== Balaclava ===
1963 Australian federal election: Balaclava
Party	Candidate	Votes	%	±%
Liberal	Ray Whittorn	23,487	58.8	+6.9
Labor	Ephraim Briskman	11,802	29.6	−0.5
Democratic Labor	John Ryan	4,135	10.4	−3.1
Independent	Edith Jewell	491	1.2	+1.2
Total formal votes		39,915	98.8	
Informal votes		485	1.2	
Turnout		43,381	97.2	
Two-party-preferred result
Liberal	Ray Whittorn		68.8	+3.0
Labor	Ephraim Briskman		31.2	−3.0
Liberal hold		Swing	+3.0	

=== Ballaarat ===
1963 Australian federal election: Ballaarat
Party	Candidate	Votes	%	±%
Liberal	Dudley Erwin	20,764	48.3	+4.7
Labor	Alan Williams	15,846	36.8	−1.7
Democratic Labor	Bob Joshua	6,421	14.9	−3.0
Total formal votes		43,031	99.2	
Informal votes		350	0.8	
Turnout		43,381	97.2	
Two-party-preferred result
Liberal	Dudley Erwin	26,764	62.2	+2.3
Labor	Alan Williams	16,267	37.8	−2.3
Liberal hold		Swing	+2.3	

=== Batman ===
1963 Australian federal election: Batman
Party	Candidate	Votes	%	±%
Labor	Sam Benson	19,858	48.8	−6.1
Liberal	Bruce Skeggs	14,923	36.7	+6.0
Democratic Labor	Jack Little	5,880	14.5	+0.1
Total formal votes		40,661	98.2	
Informal votes		725	1.8	
Turnout		41,386	96.6	
Two-party-preferred result
Labor	Sam Benson	20,682	50.9	−4.5
Liberal	Bruce Skeggs	19,979	49.1	+4.5
Labor hold		Swing	−4.5	

=== Bendigo ===
1963 Australian federal election: Bendigo
Party	Candidate	Votes	%	±%
Labor	Noel Beaton	22,646	51.2	−0.4
Liberal	Fred Grimwade	15,541	35.1	+0.9
Democratic Labor	Bill Drechsler	6,044	13.7	+0.2
Total formal votes		44,231	99.3	
Informal votes		307	0.7	
Turnout		44,538	96.9	
Two-party-preferred result
Labor	Noel Beaton		52.6	−1.6
Liberal	Fred Grimwade		47.4	+1.6
Labor hold		Swing	−1.6	

=== Bruce ===
1963 Australian federal election: Bruce
Party	Candidate	Votes	%	±%
Liberal	Billy Snedden	45,542	48.4	+6.8
Labor	Barry Jones	38,396	40.8	−1.9
Democratic Labor	Henry de Sachau	8,857	9.4	−6.3
Independent	Brian Crossley	920	1.0	+1.0
Independent	Tom Gilhooley	474	0.5	+0.5
Total formal votes		94,189	98.2	
Informal votes		1,682	1.8	
Turnout		95,871	96.8	
Two-party-preferred result
Liberal	Billy Snedden	54,026	57.4	+5.2
Labor	Barry Jones	40,163	42.6	−5.2
Liberal hold		Swing	+5.2	

=== Chisholm ===
1963 Australian federal election: Chisholm
Party	Candidate	Votes	%	±%
Liberal	Sir Wilfrid Kent Hughes	24,139	60.0	+4.4
Labor	John Button	11,878	29.5	−1.8
Democratic Labor	John Duffy	4,230	10.5	−2.7
Total formal votes		40,247	99.1	
Informal votes		352	0.9	
Turnout		40,599	96.1	
Two-party-preferred result
Liberal	Sir Wilfrid Kent Hughes		69.5	+2.0
Labor	John Button		30.5	−2.0
Liberal hold		Swing	+2.0	

=== Corangamite ===
1963 Australian federal election: Corangamite
Party	Candidate	Votes	%	±%
Liberal	Dan Mackinnon	26,347	57.5	+4.7
Labor	Fred Black	13,324	29.1	+0.1
Democratic Labor	Francis O'Brien	6,139	13.4	−4.8
Total formal votes		45,810	99.3	
Informal votes		335	0.7	
Turnout		46,145	97.5	
Two-party-preferred result
Liberal	Dan Mackinnon		69.6	+1.3
Labor	Fred Black		30.4	−1.3
Liberal hold		Swing	+1.3	

=== Corio ===
1963 Australian federal election: Corio
Party	Candidate	Votes	%	±%
Labor	Bob Hawke	21,933	45.6	+3.7
Liberal	Hubert Opperman	21,185	44.0	+0.7
Democratic Labor	James Mahoney	5,004	10.4	−4.5
Total formal votes		48,122	99.0	
Informal votes		509	1.0	
Turnout		48,631	96.9	
Two-party-preferred result
Liberal	Hubert Opperman	25,666	53.3	−3.1
Labor	Bob Hawke	22,456	46.7	+3.1
Liberal hold		Swing	−3.1	

=== Darebin ===
1963 Australian federal election: Darebin
Party	Candidate	Votes	%	±%
Labor	Frank Courtnay	28,610	55.4	+0.2
Liberal	Peter Coupe	13,688	26.5	+4.6
Democratic Labor	Tom Andrews	9,388	18.2	−4.7
Total formal votes		51,686	98.4	
Informal votes		862	1.6	
Turnout		52,548	96.7	
Two-party-preferred result
Labor	Frank Courtnay		57.1	−0.3
Liberal	Peter Coupe		42.9	+42.9
Labor hold		Swing	−0.3	

=== Deakin ===
1963 Australian federal election: Deakin
Party	Candidate	Votes	%	±%
Liberal	Frank Davis	34,863	52.0	+4.7
Labor	Pat Hubbard	25,045	37.3	−2.4
Democratic Labor	Maurice Weston	7,184	10.7	−2.3
Total formal votes		67,092	99.0	
Informal votes		711	1.0	
Turnout		67,803	96.6	
Two-party-preferred result
Liberal	Frank Davis		61.6	+3.4
Labor	Pat Hubbard		38.4	−3.4
Liberal hold		Swing	+3.4	

=== Fawkner ===
1963 Australian federal election: Fawkner
Party	Candidate	Votes	%	±%
Liberal	Peter Howson	18,614	54.5	+5.9
Labor	Gwendolyn Noad	11,774	34.5	−1.3
Democratic Labor	John Speed	2,818	8.2	−7.4
Independent	George Gabriel	966	2.8	+2.8
Total formal votes		34,172	98.1	
Informal votes		651	1.9	
Turnout		34,823	94.4	
Two-party-preferred result
Liberal	Peter Howson		63.6	+0.8
Labor	Gwendolyn Noad		36.4	−0.8
Liberal hold		Swing	+0.8	

=== Flinders ===
1963 Australian federal election: Flinders
Party	Candidate	Votes	%	±%
Liberal	Robert Lindsay	29,723	52.2	+7.7
Labor	Nola Barber	21,464	37.7	+0.4
Democratic Labor	Martin Curry	5,781	10.1	−4.7
Total formal votes		56,968	99.0	
Informal votes		581	1.0	
Turnout		57,549	96.1	
Two-party-preferred result
Liberal	Robert Lindsay		61.3	+4.0
Labor	Nola Barber		38.7	−4.0
Liberal hold		Swing	+4.0	

=== Gellibrand ===
1963 Australian federal election: Gellibrand
Party	Candidate	Votes	%	±%
Labor	Hector McIvor	25,035	64.2	−0.9
Liberal	Harley Price	8,183	21.0	+0.6
Democratic Labor	Jan Roszkowski	4,375	11.2	−0.7
Communist	David Davies	1,395	3.6	+1.1
Total formal votes		38,988	97.0	
Informal votes		1,193	3.0	
Turnout		40,181	96.6	
Two-party-preferred result
Labor	Hector McIvor		68.7	+0.2
Liberal	Harley Price		31.3	−0.2
Labor hold		Swing	+0.2	

=== Gippsland ===
1963 Australian federal election: Gippsland
Party	Candidate	Votes	%	±%
Country	Peter Nixon	25,422	57.8	+6.2
Labor	Sydney Evans	13,623	31.0	−0.5
Democratic Labor	John Hansen	4,970	11.3	−5.6
Total formal votes		44,015	99.0	
Informal votes		452	1.0	
Turnout		44,467	95.8	
Two-party-preferred result
Country	Peter Nixon		68.0	+1.1
Labor	Sydney Evans		32.0	−1.1
Country hold		Swing	+1.1	

=== Henty ===
1963 Australian federal election: Henty
Party	Candidate	Votes	%	±%
Liberal	Max Fox	24,110	51.6	+5.7
Labor	George Taylor	15,425	33.0	−7.3
Democratic Labor	Joseph McHugh	4,694	10.0	−3.8
Independent Labor	Herbert Viney	2,500	5.3	+5.3
Total formal votes		46,729	98.8	
Informal votes		564	1.2	
Turnout		47,293	96.7	
Two-party-preferred result
Liberal	Max Fox		59.3	+1.6
Labor	George Taylor		40.7	−1.6
Liberal hold		Swing	+1.6	

=== Higgins ===
1963 Australian federal election: Higgins
Party	Candidate	Votes	%	±%
Liberal	Harold Holt	22,835	60.1	+3.4
Labor	Roger Kirby	10,915	28.7	−0.6
Democratic Labor	Celia Laird	4,223	11.1	−2.9
Total formal votes		37,973	98.8	
Informal votes		444	1.2	
Turnout		38,417	95.1	
Two-party-preferred result
Liberal	Harold Holt		70.1	+0.8
Labor	Roger Kirby		29.9	−0.8
Liberal hold		Swing	+0.8	

=== Higinbotham ===
1963 Australian federal election: Higinbotham
Party	Candidate	Votes	%	±%
Liberal	Don Chipp	30,406	51.7	+8.0
Labor	Reginald Butler	22,457	38.2	−2.8
Democratic Labor	William Cameron	5,965	10.1	−5.2
Total formal votes		58,828	99.2	
Informal votes		481	0.8	
Turnout		59,309	97.0	
Two-party-preferred result
Liberal	Don Chipp		60.8	+3.0
Labor	Reginald Butler		39.2	−3.0
Liberal hold		Swing	+3.0	

=== Indi ===
1963 Australian federal election: Indi
Party	Candidate	Votes	%	±%
Country	Mac Holten	20,551	48.0	+3.6
Labor	Mervyn Huggins	10,997	25.7	+0.4
Liberal	Ian Foyster	6,111	14.3	−4.6
Democratic Labor	Christopher Cody	5,165	12.1	+0.7
Total formal votes		42,824	98.8	
Informal votes		511	1.2	
Turnout		43,335	96.9	
Two-party-preferred result
Country	Mac Holten		72.0	+17.9
Labor	Mervyn Huggins		28.0	+28.0
Country hold		Swing	+17.9	

=== Isaacs ===
1963 Australian federal election: Isaacs
Party	Candidate	Votes	%	±%
Liberal	William Haworth	17,591	49.6	+2.2
Labor	Paul Court	14,159	39.9	+1.0
Democratic Labor	John Hughes	3,710	10.5	−3.2
Total formal votes		35,460	98.1	
Informal votes		688	1.9	
Turnout		36,148	93.4	
Two-party-preferred result
Liberal	William Haworth	20,953	59.1	−0.5
Labor	Paul Court	14,507	40.9	+0.5
Liberal hold		Swing	−0.5	

=== Kooyong ===
1963 Australian federal election: Kooyong
Party	Candidate	Votes	%	±%
Liberal	Sir Robert Menzies	30,205	63.9	+6.6
Labor	Robert White	11,514	24.4	−1.6
Democratic Labor	Charles Murphy	4,806	10.2	−5.0
Communist	Ralph Gibson	727	1.5	+0.5
Total formal votes		47,252	98.9	
Informal votes		513	1.1	
Turnout		47,765	95.9	
Two-party-preferred result
Liberal	Sir Robert Menzies		74.1	+3.7
Labor	Robert White		25.9	−3.7
Liberal hold		Swing	+3.7	

=== La Trobe ===
1963 Australian federal election: La Trobe
Party	Candidate	Votes	%	±%
Liberal	John Jess	35,050	48.7	+5.0
Labor	Moss Cass	29,466	40.9	−1.1
Democratic Labor	Kevin Adamson	7,490	10.4	−3.1
Total formal votes		72,006	98.9	
Informal votes		797	1.1	
Turnout		72,803	96.8	
Two-party-preferred result
Liberal	John Jess	40,866	56.8	+0.2
Labor	Moss Cass	31,140	43.2	−0.2
Liberal hold		Swing	+0.2	

=== Lalor ===
1963 Australian federal election: Lalor
Party	Candidate	Votes	%	±%
Labor	Reg Pollard	49,383	54.4	+0.5
Liberal	Bernard Treseder	25,831	28.5	+4.2
Democratic Labor	Jim Marmion	15,507	17.1	+0.9
Total formal votes		90,721	98.0	
Informal votes		1,892	2.0	
Turnout		92,613	96.1	
Two-party-preferred result
Labor	Reg Pollard		57.0	−0.8
Liberal	Bernard Treseder		43.0	+0.8
Labor hold		Swing	−0.8	

=== Mallee ===
1963 Australian federal election: Mallee
Party	Candidate	Votes	%	±%
Country	Winton Turnbull	24,805	63.1	+0.6
Labor	Maurice Hinton	10,489	26.7	+0.4
Democratic Labor	Michael Howley	4,004	10.2	−1.0
Total formal votes		39,298	99.0	
Informal votes		396	1.0	
Turnout		39,694	96.9	
Two-party-preferred result
Country	Winton Turnbull		71.3	−1.3
Labor	Maurice Hinton		28.7	+1.3
Country hold		Swing	−1.3	

=== Maribyrnong ===
1963 Australian federal election: Maribyrnong
Party	Candidate	Votes	%	±%
Labor	Neil Armour	18,524	43.3	−3.5
Liberal	Philip Stokes	17,379	40.6	+5.8
Democratic Labor	Frank McManus	6,616	15.5	−1.9
Independent	Edwin Ryan	162	0.4	+0.4
Republican	John Murray	141	0.3	+0.3
Total formal votes		42,822	98.0	
Informal votes		865	2.0	
Turnout		43,687	97.1	
Two-party-preferred result
Liberal	Philip Stokes	23,617	55.2	+4.4
Labor	Neil Armour	19,205	44.8	−4.4
Liberal hold		Swing	+4.4	

=== McMillan ===
1963 Australian federal election: McMillan
Party	Candidate	Votes	%	±%
Liberal	Alex Buchanan	22,479	49.8	+14.3
Labor	Eric Kent	17,377	38.5	+1.6
Democratic Labor	Les Hilton	5,243	11.6	+0.0
Total formal votes		45,099	99.0	
Informal votes		442	1.0	
Turnout		45,541	96.6	
Two-party-preferred result
Liberal	Alex Buchanan	27,221	60.4	−0.8
Labor	Eric Kent	17,878	39.6	+0.8
Liberal hold		Swing	−0.8	

=== Melbourne ===
1963 Australian federal election: Melbourne
Party	Candidate	Votes	%	±%
Labor	Arthur Calwell	17,100	56.9	−5.9
Liberal	Charles Hider	7,870	26.2	+5.8
Democratic Labor	Thomas Brennan	5,084	16.9	+0.2
Total formal votes		30,054	97.1	
Informal votes		890	2.9	
Turnout		30,944	93.8	
Two-party-preferred result
Labor	Arthur Calwell		59.5	−5.0
Liberal	Charles Hider		40.5	+5.0
Labor hold		Swing	−5.0	

=== Melbourne Ports ===
1963 Australian federal election: Melbourne Ports
Party	Candidate	Votes	%	±%
Labor	Frank Crean	20,654	63.5	+1.8
Liberal	James Pond	7,178	22.1	−0.3
Democratic Labor	George O'Dwyer	4,074	12.5	−1.2
Communist	Roger Wilson	632	1.9	−0.3
Total formal votes		32,538	97.7	
Informal votes		781	2.3	
Turnout		33,319	95.1	
Two-party-preferred result
Labor	Frank Crean		66.5	+1.4
Liberal	James Pond		33.5	−1.4
Labor hold		Swing	+1.4	

=== Murray ===
1963 Australian federal election: Murray
Party	Candidate	Votes	%	±%
Country	John McEwen	29,240	64.3	+2.8
Labor	Neil Frankland	10,292	22.6	−2.6
Democratic Labor	Brian Lacey	5,914	13.0	−0.3
Total formal votes		45,446	98.6	
Informal votes		622	1.4	
Turnout		46,068	97.2	
Two-party-preferred result
Country	John McEwen		76.0	+2.5
Labor	Neil Frankland		24.0	−2.5
Country hold		Swing	+2.5	

=== Scullin ===
1963 Australian federal election: Scullin
Party	Candidate	Votes	%	±%
Labor	Ted Peters	16,764	58.5	−2.4
Liberal	John Harrison	6,131	21.4	+6.3
Democratic Labor	James Abikhair	5,194	18.1	−5.8
Communist	Ron Hearn	554	1.9	+1.9
Total formal votes		28,643	94.9	
Informal votes		1,535	5.1	
Turnout		30,178	94.4	
Two-party-preferred result
Labor	Ted Peters		61.9	−0.5
Liberal	John Harrison		32.1	+32.1
Labor hold		Swing	−0.5	

=== Wannon ===
1963 Australian federal election: Wannon
Party	Candidate	Votes	%	±%
Liberal	Malcolm Fraser	22,503	51.9	+3.5
Labor	Cyril Primmer	14,307	33.0	−2.2
Democratic Labor	Terence Callander	6,549	15.1	−1.3
Total formal votes		43,359	99.5	
Informal votes		237	0.5	
Turnout		43,596	97.2	
Two-party-preferred result
Liberal	Malcolm Fraser		65.6	+1.8
Labor	Cyril Primmer		34.4	−1.8
Liberal hold		Swing	+1.8	

=== Wills ===
1963 Australian federal election: Wills
Party	Candidate	Votes	%	±%
Labor	Gordon Bryant	20,197	54.1	−3.9
Liberal	James Muntz	10,795	28.9	+6.7
Democratic Labor	John Hardy	6,315	16.9	−2.9
Total formal votes		37,307	97.5	
Informal votes		945	2.5	
Turnout		38,252	96.2	
Two-party-preferred result
Labor	Gordon Bryant		55.8	−4.2
Liberal	James Muntz		44.2	+4.2
Labor hold		Swing	−4.2	

=== Wimmera ===
1963 Australian federal election: Wimmera
Party	Candidate	Votes	%	±%
Country	Robert King	16,772	43.0	+8.6
Labor	Thomas Windsor	11,023	28.3	−1.5
Liberal	Howard Rodda	7,599	19.5	−8.1
Democratic Labor	Adrian Cahill	3,610	9.3	+1.0
Total formal votes		39,004	99.2	
Informal votes		311	0.8	
Turnout		39,315	97.5	
Two-party-preferred result
Country	Robert King		69.2	+0.7
Labor	Thomas Windsor		30.8	−0.7
Country hold		Swing	+0.7	

=== Yarra ===
1963 Australian federal election: Yarra
Party	Candidate	Votes	%	±%
Labor	Jim Cairns	17,976	56.0	+3.9
Liberal	Anthony Hearder	9,234	28.8	+3.5
Democratic Labor	Stan Keon	4,865	15.2	−1.6
Total formal votes		32,075	98.0	
Informal votes		662	2.0	
Turnout		32,737	94.6	
Two-party-preferred result
Labor	Jim Cairns		57.5	−0.4
Liberal	Anthony Hearder		42.5	+0.4
Labor hold		Swing	−0.4	

== Queensland ==
1963 Australian federal election (Queensland)
← 1961	30 November 1963	1966 →

All 18 Queensland seats in the House of Representatives 9 seats needed for a majority
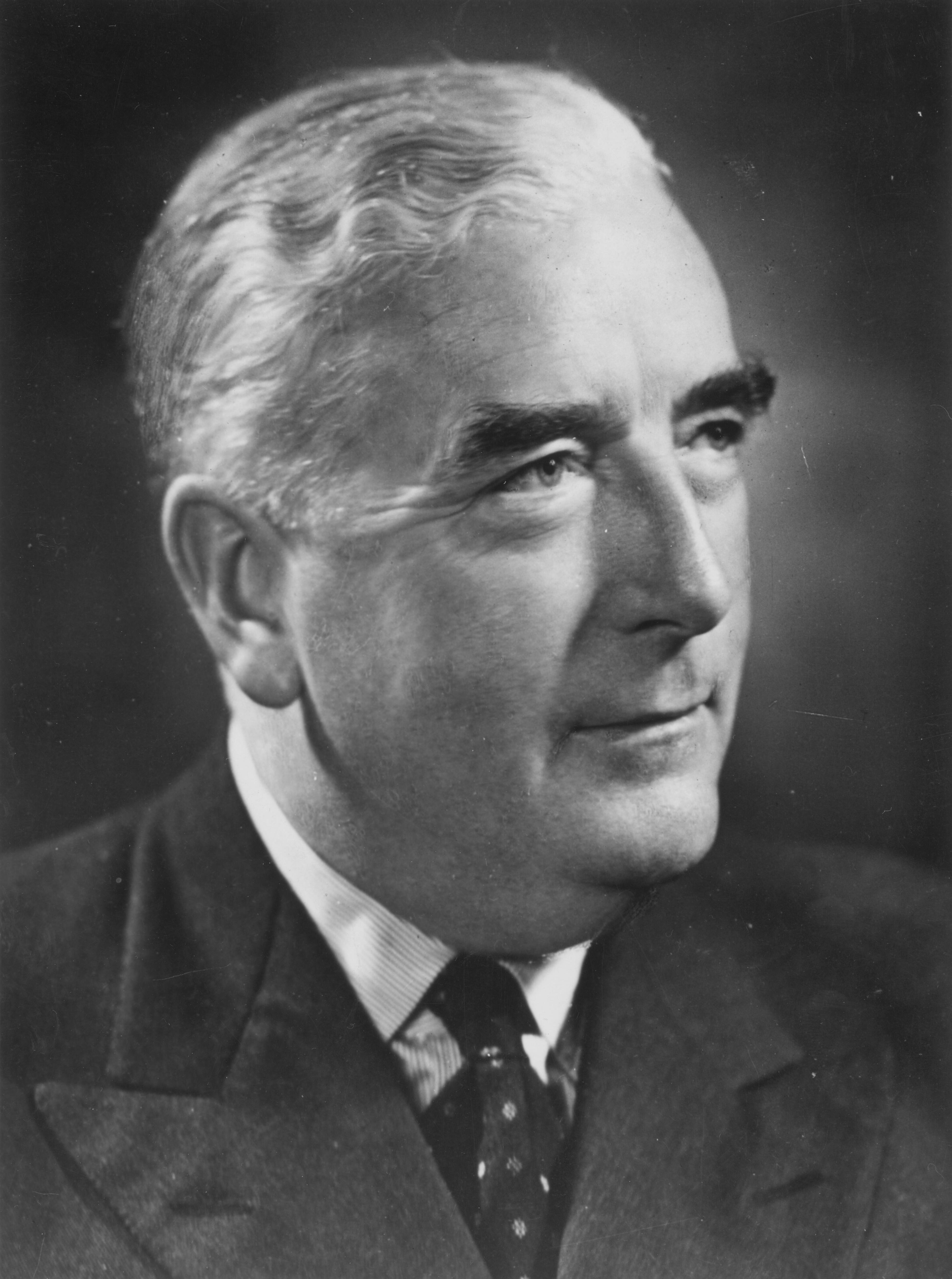

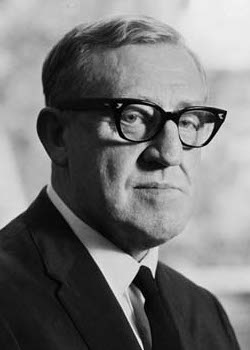
	First party	Second party
Leader	Robert Menzies	Arthur Calwell
Party	Coalition	Labor
Seats before	7	11
Seats won	10	8
Seat change	▲3	▼3
Popular vote	373,807	369,570
Percentage	46.9%	46.3%
Swing	▲3.3pp	▼1.8pp
TPP	51.9%	48.1%
TPP swing	▲2.6pp	▼2.6pp

=== Bowman ===
1963 Australian federal election: Bowman
Party	Candidate	Votes	%	±%
Labor	Jack Comber	22,533	47.7	+0.6
Liberal	Wylie Gibbs	21,618	45.8	+2.4
Democratic Labor	Harry Wright	3,052	6.5	−3.0
Total formal votes		47,203	98.0	
Informal votes		979	2.0	
Turnout		48,182	96.4	
Two-party-preferred result
Liberal	Wylie Gibbs	24,280	51.4	+3.3
Labor	Jack Comber	22,923	48.6	−3.3
Liberal gain from Labor		Swing	+3.3	

=== Brisbane ===
1963 Australian federal election: Brisbane
Party	Candidate	Votes	%	±%
Labor	Manfred Cross	17,489	50.1	−3.6
Liberal	Leith Sinclair	13,999	40.1	+7.6
Democratic Labor	John O'Connell	2,087	6.0	−5.7
Communist	Warren Bowden	1,310	3.8	+1.8
Total formal votes		34,885	96.3	
Informal votes		1,357	3.7	
Turnout		36,242	94.4	
Two-party-preferred result
Labor	Manfred Cross		54.8	−2.8
Liberal	Leith Sinclair		45.2	+2.8
Labor hold		Swing	−2.8	

=== Capricornia ===
1963 Australian federal election: Capricornia
Party	Candidate	Votes	%	±%
Labor	George Gray	21,335	56.1	+6.7
Liberal	Maurice South	13,705	36.1	−2.2
Democratic Labor	Alphonsus Schleger	2,967	7.8	−4.5
Total formal votes		38,007	98.5	
Informal votes		569	1.5	
Turnout		38,576	96.7	
Two-party-preferred result
Labor	George Gray		57.7	+2.7
Liberal	Maurice South		42.3	−2.7
Labor hold		Swing	+2.7	

=== Darling Downs ===
1963 Australian federal election: Darling Downs
Party	Candidate	Votes	%	±%
Liberal	Reginald Swartz	26,072	61.2	+10.2
Labor	Cyril Mitchell	14,418	33.9	−7.8
Democratic Labor	Kenneth Rawle	2,078	4.9	−2.5
Total formal votes		42,568	98.6	
Informal votes		589	1.4	
Turnout		43,157	97.0	
Two-party-preferred result
Liberal	Reginald Swartz		65.1	+8.2
Labor	Cyril Mitchell		34.9	−8.2
Liberal hold		Swing	+8.2	

=== Dawson ===
1963 Australian federal election: Dawson
Party	Candidate	Votes	%	±%
Country	George Shaw	19,420	51.8	−0.9
Labor	Doug Everingham	15,508	41.4	+0.6
Democratic Labor	Erwin Eshmann	2,543	6.8	+0.3
Total formal votes		37,471	97.8	
Informal votes		841	2.2	
Turnout		38,312	96.2	
Two-party-preferred result
Country	George Shaw		56.4	−1.5
Labor	Doug Everingham		43.6	+1.5
Country hold		Swing	−1.5	

=== Fisher ===
1963 Australian federal election: Fisher
Party	Candidate	Votes	%	±%
Country	Charles Adermann	27,512	64.0	+8.1
Labor	William Weir	13,882	32.3	−3.5
Democratic Labor	Geoffrey Traill	1,567	3.6	−4.7
Total formal votes		42,961	98.1	
Informal votes		838	1.9	
Turnout		43,799	96.6	
Two-party-preferred result
Country	Charles Adermann		66.9	+4.4
Labor	William Weir		33.1	−4.4
Country hold		Swing	+4.4	

=== Griffith ===
1963 Australian federal election: Griffith
Party	Candidate	Votes	%	±%
Labor	Wilfred Coutts	21,239	54.5	−0.9
Liberal	Keith Grant	15,097	38.7	+3.6
Democratic Labor	Paul Tucker	2,627	6.7	−2.9
Total formal votes		38,963	97.0	
Informal votes		1,204	3.0	
Turnout		40,167	94.8	
Two-party-preferred result
Labor	Wilfred Coutts		55.8	−1.5
Liberal	Keith Grant		44.2	+1.5
Labor hold		Swing	−1.5	

=== Herbert ===
1963 Australian federal election: Herbert
Party	Candidate	Votes	%	±%
Labor	Ted Harding	21,062	46.5	−2.5
Liberal	Roy Pope	14,805	32.7	−10.4
Democratic Labor	Kiernan Dorney	8,410	18.5	+13.4
Communist	Frank Bishop	1,063	2.3	−0.5
Total formal votes		45,340	97.4	
Informal votes		1,229	2.6	
Turnout		46,569	95.8	
Two-party-preferred result
Labor	Ted Harding	24,132	53.2	+0.9
Liberal	Roy Pope	21,208	46.8	−0.9
Labor hold		Swing	+0.9	

=== Kennedy ===
1963 Australian federal election: Kennedy
Party	Candidate	Votes	%	±%
Labor	Bill Riordan	21,182	61.4	−0.7
Country	Keith Siemon	11,144	32.3	+0.8
Democratic Labor	John Judge	2,174	6.3	−0.1
Total formal votes		34,500	97.8	
Informal votes		791	2.2	
Turnout		35,291	90.1	
Two-party-preferred result
Labor	Bill Riordan		63.5	+0.1
Country	Keith Siemon		36.5	−0.1
Labor hold		Swing	+0.1	

=== Leichhardt ===
1963 Australian federal election: Leichhardt
Party	Candidate	Votes	%	±%
Labor	Bill Fulton	24,881	58.0	−8.3
Country	Robert Norman	16,895	39.4	+12.0
Democratic Labor	Arthur Trembath	1,158	2.7	−3.6
Total formal votes		42,934	97.3	
Informal votes		1,196	2.7	
Turnout		44,130	92.9	
Two-party-preferred result
Labor	Bill Fulton		58.5	−9.1
Country	Robert Norman		41.5	+9.1
Labor hold		Swing	−9.1	

=== Lilley ===
1963 Australian federal election: Lilley
Party	Candidate	Votes	%	±%
Labor	Don Cameron	20,548	45.7	−0.9
Liberal	Kevin Cairns	20,503	45.6	+2.3
Democratic Labor	Frank Andrews	3,934	8.7	−1.4
Total formal votes		44,985	97.8	
Informal votes		1,032	2.2	
Turnout		46,017	95.4	
Two-party-preferred result
Liberal	Kevin Cairns	24,083	53.5	+4.8
Labor	Don Cameron	20,902	46.5	−4.8
Liberal gain from Labor		Swing	+4.8	

=== Maranoa ===
1963 Australian federal election: Maranoa
Party	Candidate	Votes	%	±%
Country	Wilfred Brimblecombe	20,649	54.8	+7.3
Labor	Trevor Alexander	15,965	42.4	−1.9
Democratic Labor	Mervyn Eunson	1,054	2.8	−5.4
Total formal votes		37,668	98.4	
Informal votes		627	1.6	
Turnout		38,295	93.6	
Two-party-preferred result
Country	Wilfred Brimblecombe		57.0	+3.4
Labor	Trevor Alexander		43.0	−3.4
Country hold		Swing	+3.4	

=== McPherson ===
1963 Australian federal election: McPherson
Party	Candidate	Votes	%	±%
Country	Charles Barnes	33,422	58.1	+4.3
Labor	Gerry Jones	21,657	37.6	+0.6
Democratic Labor	Michael O'Connor	2,481	4.3	−2.2
Total formal votes		57,560	97.7	
Informal votes		1,347	2.3	
Turnout		58,907	94.8	
Two-party-preferred result
Country	Charles Barnes		61.5	+1.1
Labor	Gerry Jones		38.5	−1.1
Country hold		Swing	+1.1	

=== Moreton ===
1963 Australian federal election: Moreton
Party	Candidate	Votes	%	±%
Liberal	James Killen	28,574	49.3	+6.0
Labor	John O'Donnell	25,609	44.2	−3.8
Democratic Labor	Eric Allingham	3,790	6.5	−0.9
Total formal votes		57,973	97.6	
Informal votes		1,408	2.4	
Turnout		59,381	95.7	
Two-party-preferred result
Liberal	James Killen	31,893	55.0	+4.9
Labor	John O'Donnell	26,080	45.0	−4.9
Liberal hold		Swing	+4.9	

=== Oxley ===
1963 Australian federal election: Oxley
Party	Candidate	Votes	%	±%
Labor	Bill Hayden	25,194	57.6	+4.9
Liberal	Arthur Chresby	16,600	38.0	−5.3
Democratic Labor	Terence Burns	1,942	4.4	+0.3
Total formal votes		43,736	98.3	
Informal votes		761	1.7	
Turnout		44,497	97.0	
Two-party-preferred result
Labor	Bill Hayden		58.3	+4.8
Liberal	Arthur Chresby		41.7	−4.8
Labor hold		Swing	+4.8	

=== Petrie ===
1963 Australian federal election: Petrie
Party	Candidate	Votes	%	±%
Liberal	Alan Hulme	27,616	47.1	+5.2
Labor	Reginald O'Brien	26,804	45.7	−3.5
Democratic Labor	Brian Balaam	4,035	6.9	+1.0
Independent	Francis O'Mara	159	0.3	−0.2
Total formal votes		58,614	97.7	
Informal votes		1,394	2.3	
Turnout		60,008	96.0	
Two-party-preferred result
Liberal	Alan Hulme	31,335	53.5	+4.2
Labor	Reginald O'Brien	27,279	46.5	−4.2
Liberal gain from Labor		Swing	+4.2	

=== Ryan ===
1963 Australian federal election: Ryan
Party	Candidate	Votes	%	±%
Liberal	Nigel Drury	29,608	58.2	+6.0
Labor	Raymond McCreath	17,082	33.6	−6.4
Democratic Labor	Brian O'Brien	3,587	7.1	−0.8
Social Credit	Robert Hooker	588	1.2	+1.2
Total formal votes		50,865	97.6	
Informal votes		1,230	2.4	
Turnout		52,095	95.4	
Two-party-preferred result
Liberal	Nigel Drury		65.7	+7.2
Labor	Raymond McCreath		34.3	−7.2
Liberal hold		Swing	+7.2	

=== Wide Bay ===
1963 Australian federal election: Wide Bay
Party	Candidate	Votes	%	±%
Labor	Brendan Hansen	23,182	56.0	+2.6
Country	Albert White	16,568	40.0	−0.1
Democratic Labor	Rogers Judge	935	2.3	−2.0
Social Credit	Geoffrey Nichols	700	1.7	+1.7
Total formal votes		41,385	98.2	
Informal votes		738	1.8	
Turnout		42,123	96.7	
Two-party-preferred result
Labor	Brendan Hansen		57.3	+2.1
Country	Albert White		42.7	−2.1
Labor hold		Swing	+2.1	

== South Australia ==
1963 Australian federal election (South Australia)
← 1961	30 November 1963	1966 →

All 11 SA seats in the House of Representatives 6 seats needed for a majority
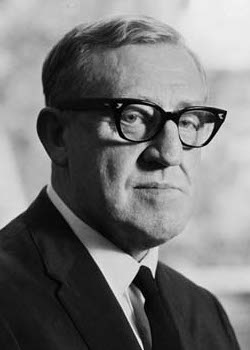

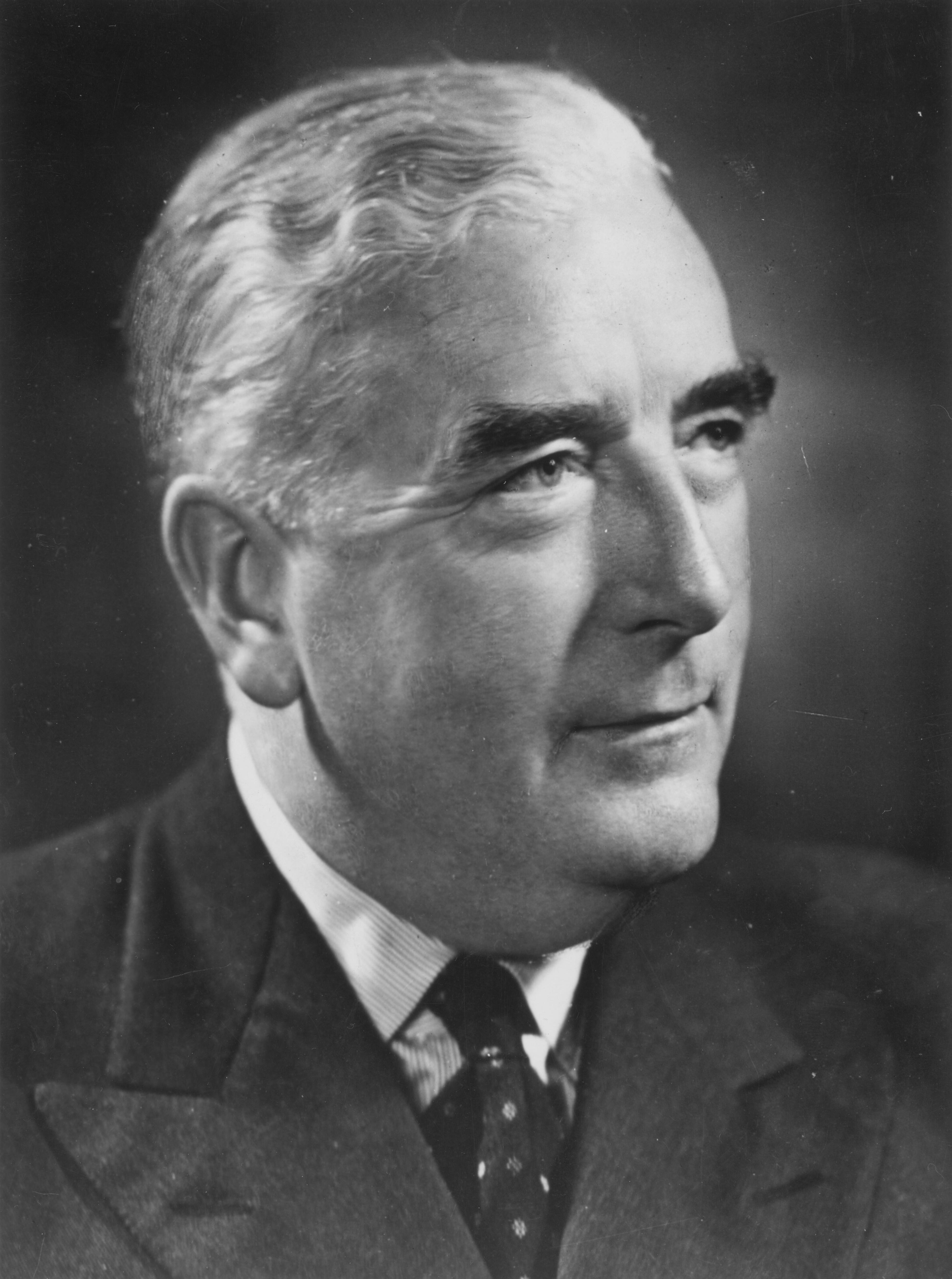
	First party	Second party
Leader	Arthur Calwell	Robert Menzies
Party	Labor	Coalition
Seats before	6	5
Seats won	6	5
Seat change	Steady	Steady
Popular vote	270,956	183,490
Percentage	53.2%	36.0%
Swing	▼1.1pp	▼4.2pp
TPP	53.3%	46.7%
TPP swing	▼0.9pp	▲0.9pp

=== Adelaide ===
1963 Australian federal election: Adelaide
Party	Candidate	Votes	%	±%
Labor	Joe Sexton	18,194	56.1	+0.3
Liberal	Karl-Juergen Liebetrau	12,188	37.6	+3.1
Democratic Labor	Patrick Coffey	2,036	6.3	−3.4
Total formal votes		32,418	97.6	
Informal votes		797	2.4	
Turnout		33,215	95.9	
Two-party-preferred result
Labor	Joe Sexton		57.2	−0.3
Liberal	Karl-Juergen Liebetrau		42.8	+0.3
Labor hold		Swing	−0.3	

=== Angas ===
1963 Australian federal election: Angas
Party	Candidate	Votes	%	±%
Liberal	Alick Downer	25,676	61.9	+5.2
Labor	Robert Nielsen	14,709	35.5	−0.8
Communist	Elliott Johnston	1,075	2.6	+2.6
Total formal votes		41,460	98.4	
Informal votes		665	1.6	
Turnout		42,125	97.4	
Two-party-preferred result
Liberal	Alick Downer		62.2	+0.6
Labor	Robert Nielsen		37.8	−0.6
Liberal hold		Swing	+0.6	

=== Barker ===
1963 Australian federal election: Barker
Party	Candidate	Votes	%	±%
Liberal	Jim Forbes	26,547	56.8	+2.4
Labor	Norman Alcock	19,168	41.0	+1.0
Independent	Harvey Burns	1,043	2.2	+2.2
Total formal votes		46,758	98.7	
Informal votes		596	1.3	
Turnout		47,354	97.5	
Two-party-preferred result
Liberal	Jim Forbes		57.9	−0.3
Labor	Norman Alcock		42.1	+0.3
Liberal hold		Swing	−0.3	

=== Bonython ===
1963 Australian federal election: Bonython
Party	Candidate	Votes	%	±%
Labor	Martin Nicholls	45,537	70.9	+7.7
Democratic Labor	Edward Timlin	14,084	21.9	+15.9
Communist	Alan Miller	4,638	7.2	+6.0
Total formal votes		64,259	94.7	
Informal votes		3,572	5.3	
Turnout		67,831	96.4	
Two-party-preferred result
Labor	Martin Nicholls		77.4	+9.7
Democratic Labor	Edward Timlin		22.6	+22.6
Labor hold		Swing	+9.7	

=== Boothby ===
1963 Australian federal election: Boothby
Party	Candidate	Votes	%	±%
Liberal	John McLeay	23,309	55.1	+3.7
Labor	Ronald Basten	17,248	40.8	−1.3
Democratic Labor	Ted Farrell	1,760	4.2	−2.3
Total formal votes		42,317	98.5	
Informal votes		647	1.5	
Turnout		42,964	95.7	
Two-party-preferred result
Liberal	John McLeay		58.5	+1.9
Labor	Ronald Basten		41.5	−1.9
Liberal hold		Swing	+1.9	

=== Grey ===
1963 Australian federal election: Grey
Party	Candidate	Votes	%	±%
Labor	Jack Mortimer	24,236	54.2	−4.0
Liberal	Vern Dyason	18,749	41.9	+3.7
Democratic Labor	William Ahern	1,718	3.8	+0.2
Total formal votes		44,703	98.9	
Informal votes		492	1.1	
Turnout		45,195	96.7	
Two-party-preferred result
Labor	Jack Mortimer		54.8	−4.0
Liberal	Vern Dyason		45.2	+4.0
Labor hold		Swing	−4.0	

=== Hindmarsh ===
1963 Australian federal election: Hindmarsh
Party	Candidate	Votes	%	±%
Labor	Clyde Cameron	33,975	71.9	+4.0
Democratic Labor	Richard Mills	13,281	28.1	+23.5
Total formal votes		47,256	94.8	
Informal votes		2,587	5.2	
Turnout		49,843	95.8	
Labor hold		Swing	+3.1	

=== Kingston ===
1963 Australian federal election: Kingston
Party	Candidate	Votes	%	±%
Labor	Pat Galvin	32,582	53.6	−2.6
Liberal	Kay Brownbill	25,375	41.7	+6.6
Democratic Labor	Brian Crowe	2,858	4.7	−4.0
Total formal votes		60,815	98.8	
Informal votes		752	1.2	
Turnout		61,567	97.1	
Two-party-preferred result
Labor	Pat Galvin		54.5	−4.2
Liberal	Kay Brownbill		45.5	+4.2
Labor hold		Swing	−4.2	

=== Port Adelaide ===
1963 Australian federal election: Port Adelaide
Party	Candidate	Votes	%	±%
Labor	Fred Birrell	30,994	76.2	+4.4
Democratic Labor	George Basisovs	8,219	20.2	+12.3
Communist	Jim Moss	1,463	3.6	+1.4
Total formal votes		40,676	94.8	
Informal votes		2,230	5.2	
Turnout		42,906	96.4	
Two-party-preferred result
Labor	Fred Birrell		79.4	+4.2
Democratic Labor	George Basisovs		20.6	+20.6
Labor hold		Swing	+4.2	

=== Sturt ===
1963 Australian federal election: Sturt
Party	Candidate	Votes	%	±%
Liberal	Keith Wilson	26,469	56.0	+3.8
Labor	Norm Foster	18,264	38.6	−0.3
Democratic Labor	Walter Doran	2,551	5.4	−3.5
Total formal votes		47,284	98.0	
Informal votes		971	2.0	
Turnout		48,255	96.1	
Two-party-preferred result
Liberal	Keith Wilson		59.5	+1.0
Labor	Norm Foster		40.5	−1.0
Liberal hold		Swing	+1.0	

=== Wakefield ===
1963 Australian federal election: Wakefield
Party	Candidate	Votes	%	±%
Liberal	Bert Kelly	25,177	61.1	+3.0
Labor	John Penrose	16,049	38.9	+2.2
Total formal votes		41,226	98.4	
Informal votes		654	1.6	
Turnout		41,880	97.5	
Liberal hold		Swing	−1.2	

== Western Australia ==
1963 Australian federal election (Western Australia)
← 1961	30 November 1963	1966 →

All 8 WA seats in the House of Representatives 4 seats needed for a majority
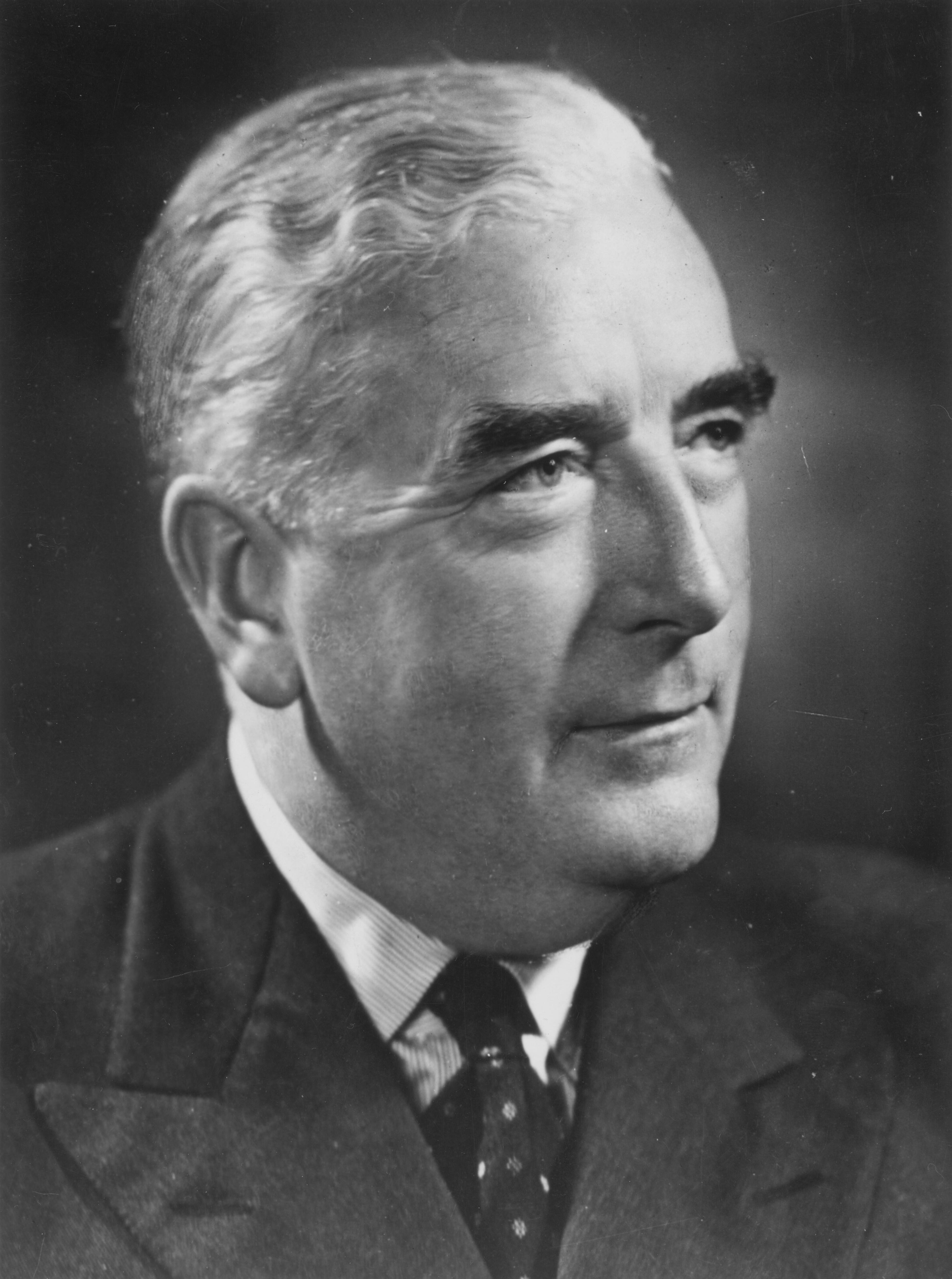

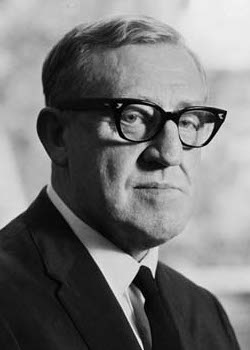
	First party	Second party
Leader	Robert Menzies	Arthur Calwell
Party	Coalition	Labor
Seats before	6	3
Seats won	6	3
Seat change	Steady	Steady
Popular vote	202,215	146,596
Percentage	54.0%	39.2%
Swing	▲2.2pp	▼1.7pp
TPP	56.2%	43.8%
TPP swing	Steady	Steady

=== Canning ===
1963 Australian federal election: Canning
Party	Candidate	Votes	%	±%
Liberal	Neil McNeill	17,000	43.5	+5.3
Country	John Hallett	10,844	27.7	−0.2
Labor	Charles Edwards	10,204	26.1	−3.1
Independent	Ronald Batey	1,072	2.7	+2.7
Total formal votes		39,120	97.7	
Informal votes		922	2.3	
Turnout		40,042	95.9	
Two-party-preferred result
Country	John Hallett	20,434	52.2	+52.2
Liberal	Neil McNeill	18,686	47.8	−17.9
Country gain from Liberal		Swing	+17.9	

=== Curtin ===
1963 Australian federal election: Curtin
Party	Candidate	Votes	%	±%
Liberal	Paul Hasluck	29,200	75.6	+12.4
Democratic Labor	Francis Dwyer	6,992	18.1	+6.0
Communist	John Gandini	2,426	6.3	+6.3
Total formal votes		38,618	93.5	
Informal votes		2,669	6.5	
Turnout		41,287	95.9	
Two-party-preferred result
Liberal	Paul Hasluck		78.8	+5.7
Democratic Labor	Francis Dwyer		21.2	+21.2
Liberal hold		Swing	+5.7	

=== Forrest ===
1963 Australian federal election: Forrest
Party	Candidate	Votes	%	±%
Liberal	Gordon Freeth	20,921	52.1	−5.4
Labor	Robert Smithson	15,899	39.6	−2.9
Independent Country	Frank Oates	3,304	8.2	+8.2
Total formal votes		40,124	98.6	
Informal votes		583	1.4	
Turnout		40,707	96.6	
Two-party-preferred result
Liberal	Gordon Freeth		56.2	−1.3
Labor	Robert Smithson		43.8	+1.3
Liberal hold		Swing	−1.3	

=== Fremantle ===
1963 Australian federal election: Fremantle
Party	Candidate	Votes	%	±%
Labor	Kim Beazley Sr.	27,203	54.9	−5.8
Liberal	John Waghorne	20,931	42.2	+5.4
Independent	James Collins	748	1.5	+1.5
Communist	Paddy Troy	676	1.4	−1.0
Total formal votes		49,558	97.9	
Informal votes		1,043	2.1	
Turnout		50,601	96.3	
Two-party-preferred result
Labor	Kim Beazley Sr.		57.0	−5.9
Liberal	John Waghorne		43.0	+5.9
Labor hold		Swing	−5.9	

=== Kalgoorlie ===
1963 Australian federal election: Kalgoorlie
Party	Candidate	Votes	%	±%
Labor	Fred Collard	16,180	52.3	+4.4
Liberal	Peter Browne	12,668	41.0	−2.3
Democratic Labor	James Ardagh	1,328	4.3	+1.4
Democratic Labor	Antonius Berkhout	751	2.4	+2.4
Total formal votes		30,927	98.5	
Informal votes		467	1.5	
Turnout		31,394	89.6	
Two-party-preferred result
Labor	Fred Collard		53.4	+2.8
Liberal	Peter Browne		46.6	−2.8
Labor hold		Swing	+2.8	

=== Moore ===
1963 Australian federal election: Moore
Party	Candidate	Votes	%	±%
Liberal	Vic Halbert	12,876	34.0	−1.0
Country	Don Maisey	12,810	33.9	+3.1
Labor	Wilbur Bennett	12,146	32.1	+3.6
Total formal votes		37,832	98.3	
Informal votes		670	1.7	
Turnout		38,502	95.5	
Two-party-preferred result
Country	Don Maisey	21,847	57.7	+6.4
Liberal	Vic Halbert	15,985	42.3	−6.4
Country hold		Swing	+6.4	

=== Perth ===
1963 Australian federal election: Perth
Party	Candidate	Votes	%	±%
Liberal	Fred Chaney Sr.	15,867	54.3	−0.7
Labor	Edward Halse	11,743	40.2	+4.4
Democratic Labor	Arthur White	1,629	5.6	−3.6
Total formal votes		29,239	97.1	
Informal votes		860	2.9	
Turnout		30,099	93.8	
Two-party-preferred result
Liberal	Fred Chaney Sr.		58.8	−3.6
Labor	Edward Halse		41.2	+3.6
Liberal hold		Swing	−3.6	

=== Stirling ===
1963 Australian federal election: Stirling
Party	Candidate	Votes	%	±%
Labor	Harry Webb	29,806	50.1	+1.9
Liberal	Doug Cash	25,641	43.1	+5.3
Democratic Labor	Brian Peachey	4,044	6.8	−6.0
Total formal votes		59,491	98.1	
Informal votes		1,126	1.9	
Turnout		60,617	96.5	
Two-party-preferred result
Labor	Harry Webb		51.5	+1.2
Liberal	Doug Cash		48.5	−1.2
Labor hold		Swing	+1.2	

=== Swan ===
1963 Australian federal election: Swan
Party	Candidate	Votes	%	±%
Liberal	Richard Cleaver	23,547	47.5	−1.8
Labor	Joe Berinson	23,415	47.3	+4.6
Democratic Labor	Gerardus Sappelli	2,253	4.5	−3.6
Independent	Warwick Hill	312	0.6	+0.6
Total formal votes		49,527	98.1	
Informal votes		937	1.9	
Turnout		50,464	95.8	
Two-party-preferred result
Liberal	Richard Cleaver	25,799	52.1	−3.4
Labor	Joe Berinson	23,728	47.9	+3.4
Liberal hold		Swing	−3.4	

== Tasmania ==
1963 Australian federal election (Tasmania)
← 1961	30 November 1963	1966 →

All 5 Tasmanian seats in the House of Representatives 3 seats needed for a majority
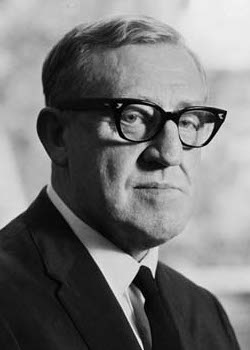

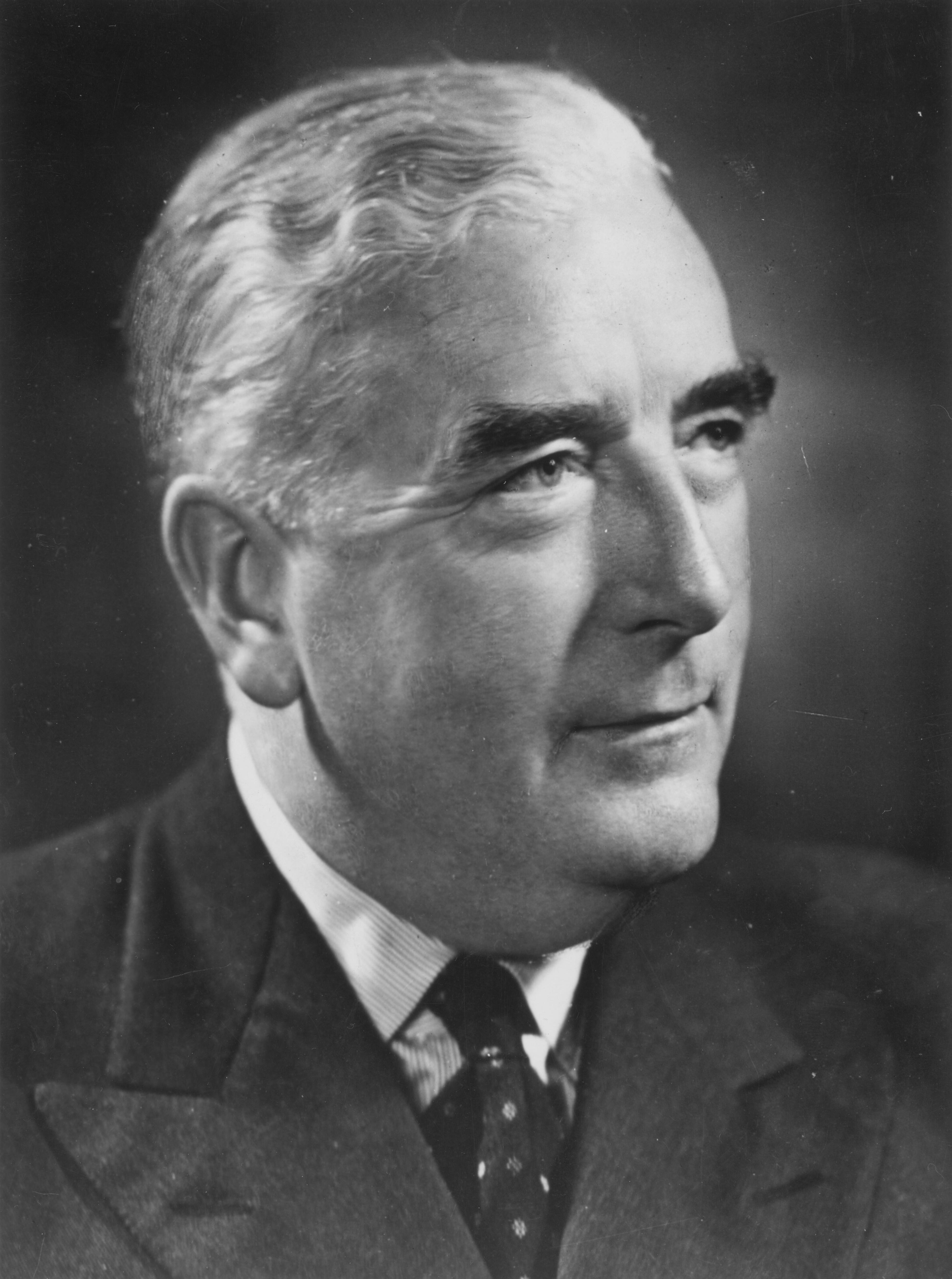
	First party	Second party
Leader	Arthur Calwell	Robert Menzies
Party	Labor	Coalition
Seats before	3	2
Seats won	3	2
Seat change	Steady	Steady
Popular vote	94,581	73,491
Percentage	52.1%	40.7%
Swing	▼1.6pp	▲2.1pp
TPP	53.9%	45.5%
TPP swing	▼0.6pp	▲0.6pp

=== Bass ===
1963 Australian federal election: Bass
Party	Candidate	Votes	%	±%
Labor	Lance Barnard	21,182	58.3	−4.4
Liberal	James Wardlaw	13,078	36.0	+3.1
Democratic Labor	Frederick Kaye	2,055	5.7	+1.3
Total formal votes		36,315	98.9	
Informal votes		410	1.1	
Turnout		36,725	96.3	
Two-party-preferred result
Labor	Lance Barnard		59.4	−4.2
Liberal	James Wardlaw		40.6	+4.2
Labor hold		Swing	−4.2	

=== Braddon ===
1963 Australian federal election: Braddon
Party	Candidate	Votes	%	±%
Labor	Ron Davies	20,843	57.6	−3.3
Liberal	Paul Fenton	13,488	37.3	+4.3
Democratic Labor	Frances Lane	1,853	5.1	−0.9
Total formal votes		36,184	99.0	
Informal votes		351	1.0	
Turnout		36,535	96.4	
Two-party-preferred result
Labor	Ron Davies		58.6	−3.5
Liberal	Paul Fenton		41.4	+3.5
Labor hold		Swing	−3.5	

=== Denison ===
1963 Australian federal election: Denison
Party	Candidate	Votes	%	±%
Liberal	Athol Townley	17,372	51.3	−0.2
Labor	Donald Finlay	13,286	39.2	−1.8
Democratic Labor	Brian Bresnehan	2,159	6.4	−1.0
Independent	Bruce Brown	558	1.6	+1.6
Communist	Max Bound	506	1.5	+1.5
Total formal votes		33,881	98.0	
Informal votes		704	2.0	
Turnout		34,585	94.8	
Two-party-preferred result
Liberal	Athol Townley		57.4	+0.0
Labor	Donald Finlay		42.6	-0.0
Liberal hold		Swing	+0.0	

=== Franklin ===
1963 Australian federal election: Franklin
Party	Candidate	Votes	%	±%
Labor	John Parsons	19,362	47.9	+4.9
Liberal	Bill Falkinder	18,322	45.3	−0.6
Democratic Labor	Andrew Defendini	2,732	6.8	−4.3
Total formal votes		40,416	98.8	
Informal votes		509	1.2	
Turnout		40,925	96.6	
Two-party-preferred result
Liberal	Bill Falkinder	20,582	50.9	−3.8
Labor	John Parsons	19,834	49.1	+3.8
Liberal hold		Swing	−3.8	

=== Wilmot ===
1963 Australian federal election: Wilmot
Party	Candidate	Votes	%	±%
Labor	Gil Duthie	19,908	58.7	−3.9
Liberal	Donald Paterson	11,231	33.1	+4.0
Democratic Labor	Alastair Davidson	2,792	8.2	−0.1
Total formal votes		33,931	99.1	
Informal votes		319	0.9	
Turnout		34,250	96.1	
Two-party-preferred result
Labor	Gil Duthie		61.1	−5.0
Liberal	Donald Paterson		38.9	+5.0
Labor hold		Swing	−5.0	

== Territories ==
=== Australian Capital Territory ===
1963 Australian federal election (Australian Capital Territory)
← 1961	30 November 1963	1966 →

Division of Australian Capital Territory
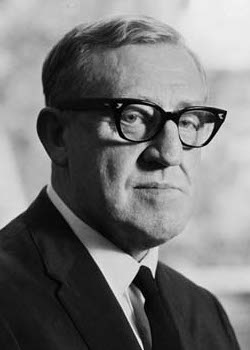

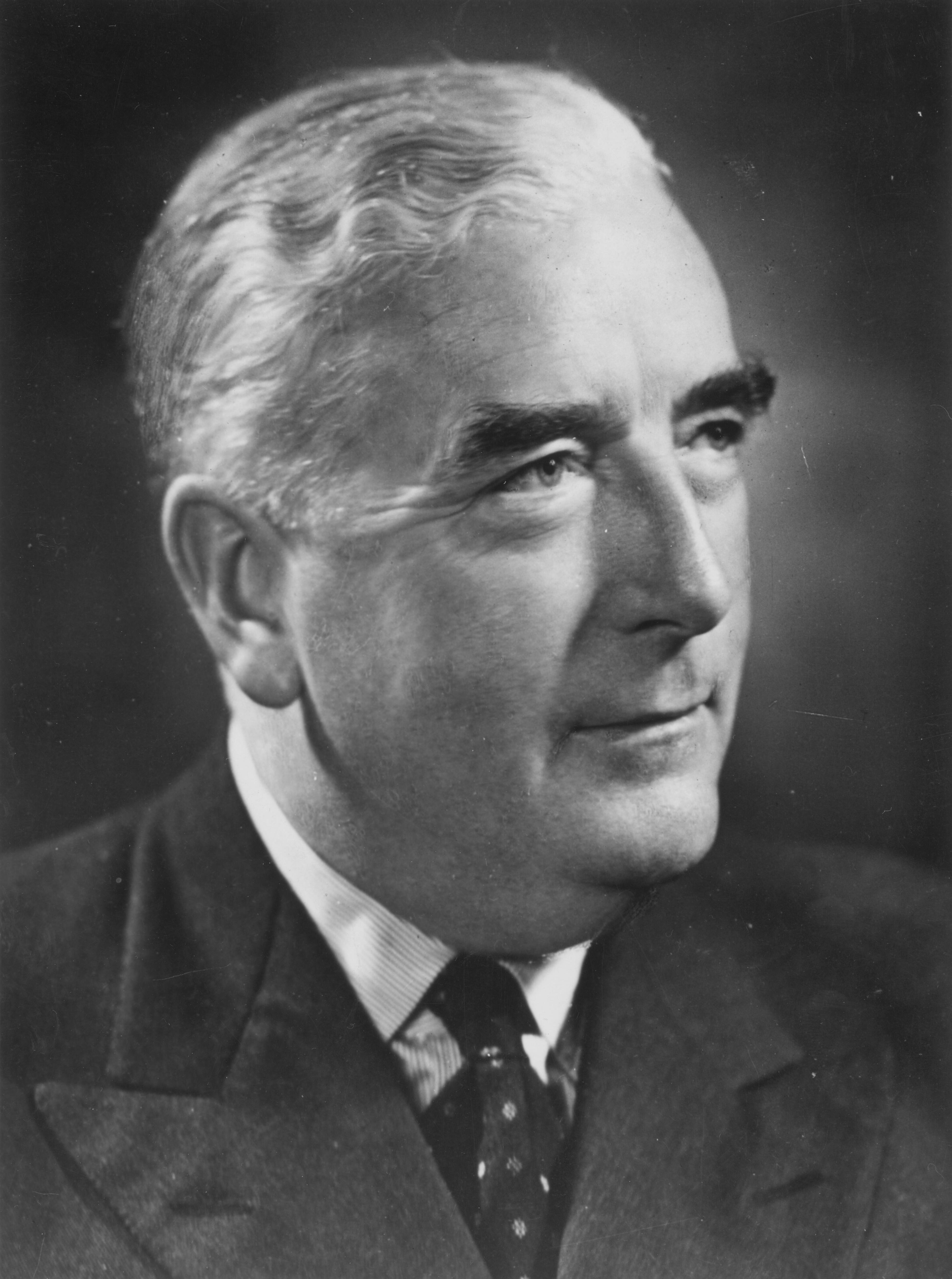
	First party	Second party
Leader	Arthur Calwell	Robert Menzies
Party	Labor	Coalition
Seats before	1	0
Seats won	1	0
Seat change	Steady	Steady
Popular vote	17,984	14,748
Percentage	54.9%	45.1%
Swing	▼10.0pp	▲10.0pp

1963 Australian federal election: Australian Capital Territory
Party	Candidate	Votes	%	±%
Labor	Jim Fraser	17,984	54.9	−10.0
Liberal	Elizabeth Calvert	14,748	45.1	+10.0
Total formal votes		32,732	97.9	
Informal votes		701	2.1	
Turnout		33,433	92.8	
Labor hold		Swing	−10.0	

=== Northern Territory ===
1963 Australian federal election: Northern Territory
Party	Candidate	Votes	%	±%
Labor	Jock Nelson	unopposed		
Labor hold		Swing		

== See also ==
- Candidates of the 1963 Australian federal election
- Members of the Australian House of Representatives, 1963–1966
