= Bill Graham (Australian politician) =

Australian politician

Bill Graham OBE
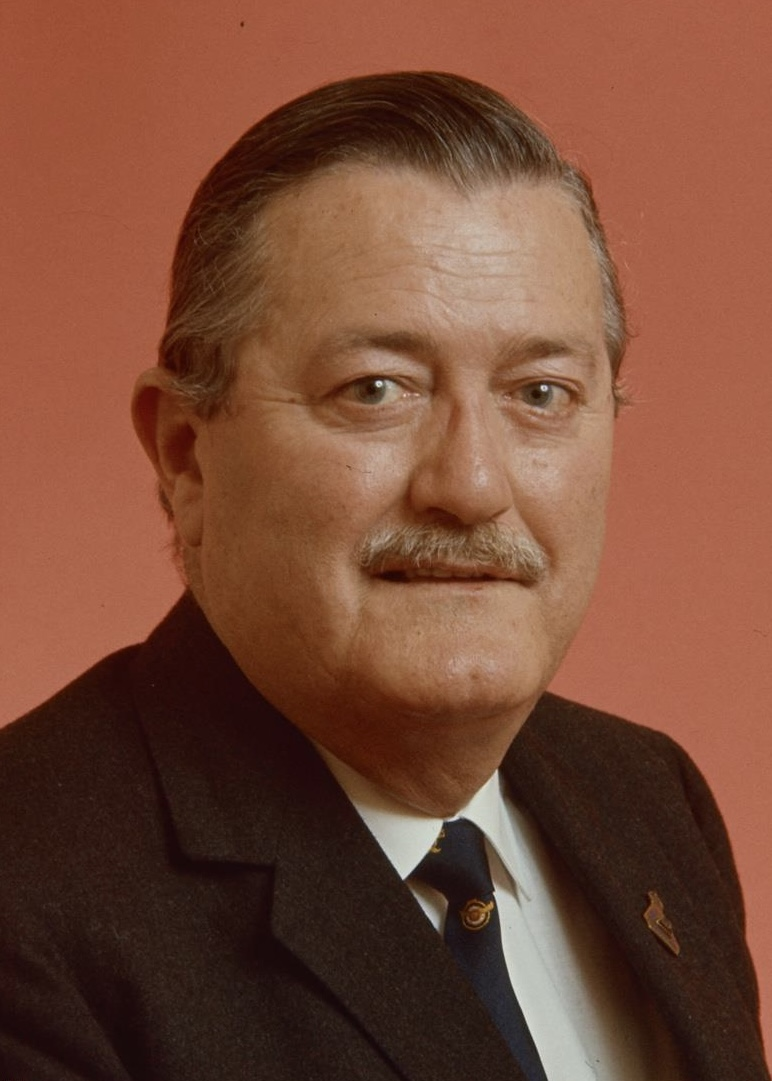
- Graham in 1974

Member of the Australian Parliament for St George
- In office 10 December 1949 – 29 May 1954
- Preceded by: New seat
- Succeeded by: Nelson Lemmon
- In office 10 December 1955 – 22 November 1958
- Preceded by: Nelson Lemmon
- Succeeded by: Lionel Clay

Member of the Australian Parliament for North Sydney
- In office 26 November 1966 – 19 September 1980
- Preceded by: William Jack
- Succeeded by: John Spender

Personal details
- Born: Bruce William Graham; 22 August 1919 Sydney
- Died: 18 February 1995 (aged 75)
- Party: Liberal Party of Australia
- Spouse: Jean Frances Lethbridge King
- Relations: 3 children – Margaret, Penelope and Joanne
- Occupation: Company director

Bruce William Graham, OBE (22 August 1919 – 18 February 1995) was an Australian politician. He was a member of the Liberal Party and served in the House of Representatives for over 20 years, representing the New South Wales seats of St George (1949–1954, 1955–1958) and North Sydney (1966–1980).

== Early life ==
Graham was born in Sydney on 22 August 1919. He was educated at Sydney Grammar School before becoming an announcer on the ABC. He played rugby union with Eastern Suburbs RUFC, cricket for the Waverley Cricket Club, and was a member of the Tamarama Surf Life Saving Club.

== Military service ==
Graham enlisted in the Royal Australian Air Force (RAAF) in March 1939. He spent time with No. 22 Squadron and No. 6 Squadron based out of RAAF Base Richmond. He joined the No. 2 Service Flying Training School at RAAF Base Forest Hill in August 1940. He was promoted flying officer three months later and then made flight lieutenant in January 1942. Graham was subsequently posted to No. 1 Air Observers School in Cootamundra, No. 33 Squadron in Townsville, and No. 2 Air Ambulance Unit in Canberra.

In June 1942, Graham fractured his spine and both legs in an aircraft crash. He spent two years in hospital and underwent a number of operations, allowing him to return to active service. He was subsequently stationed at Parafield with No. 34 Squadron, at Uranquinty with No. 5 Service Flying Training School, at Bundaberg with No. 88 Operational Base Unit, and finally at RAAF headquarters in Sydney. He accumulated over 1,200 hours of flying time with the RAAF.

Graham's leg was amputated in May 1947, having deteriorated after initially successful surgeries. He received a medical discharge in September 1948, having attained the rank of squadron leader.

== Politics ==
Graham was first elected to parliament at the 1949 federal election as the Liberal member for St George in the Australian House of Representatives. He held the seat until 1954, when he was defeated by former Labor minister Nelson Lemmon. Graham defeated Lemmon in 1955, but was defeated again in 1958, this time by Lionel Clay. He returned to politics in 1966 when he was elected to the seat of North Sydney, a position he held until his retirement in 1980. Graham died in 1995.

Parliament of Australia
Preceded by new seat	Member for St George; 1949–1954	Succeeded by Nelson Lemmon
Preceded by Nelson Lemmon	Member for St George; 1955–1958	Succeeded by Lionel Clay
Preceded by William Jack	Member for North Sydney; 1966–1980	Succeeded by John Spender
