= Nelson Lemmon =

Australian politician

The Honourable Nelson Lemmon
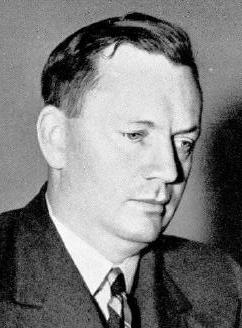

Minister for Works and Housing
- In office 1 November 1946 – 19 December 1949
- Prime Minister: Ben Chifley
- Preceded by: Bert Lazzarini
- Succeeded by: Richard Casey

Member of the Australian Parliament for St George
- In office 29 May 1954 – 10 December 1955
- Preceded by: Bill Graham
- Succeeded by: Bill Graham

Member of the Australian Parliament for Forrest
- In office 21 August 1943 – 10 December 1949
- Preceded by: John Prowse
- Succeeded by: Gordon Freeth

Personal details
- Born: 22 March 1908 Williamstown, Victoria, Australia
- Died: 20 March 1989 (aged 80) Robertson, New South Wales, Australia
- Party: Country Party (1930s); Australian Labor Party
- Spouse: Ada Mary Jackel
- Occupation: Farmer

Nelson Lemmon (22 March 1908 – 20 March 1989) was an Australian politician. He was a member of the Australian Labor Party (ALP) and served as Minister for Works and Housing (1946–1949) in the Chifley government. He played a key role in establishing the Snowy Mountains Scheme.

== Early life ==
Lemmon was born at Williamstown, Victoria, the son of John Lemmon, Australian Labor Party politician and Australian Labor Party member for Williamstown in the Victorian Legislative Assembly from 1904 to 1955. He was educated at Williamstown State School and Longerenong Agricultural College, but subsequently moved to Ongerup, in the Great Southern region of Western Australia, to take up farming, and married Ada Mary Jackel in 1930. Lemmon was later elected chairman of the Gnowangerup Road Board, becoming the youngest road board chairman in the state. He also served as a "prominent member" of the Wheatgrowers' Union.

== Early political involvement ==
Running as an unendorsed Country Party candidate, Lemmon unsuccessfully contested the seat of Katanning in the Legislative Assembly at both a 1935 by-election and the 1936 state election. Lemmon was defeated by Arthur Watts, a future deputy premier, on both occasions, at the by-election losing by only 43 votes after five rounds of counting.

== Federal politics ==
Remaining involved in politics, although switching to the Labor Party, Lemmon won the House of Representatives seat of Forrest at the 1943 election. He defeated longtime Country member John Prowse on a swing of almost 14 percent as part of that year's massive Labor landslide. Notably, he won almost 53 percent of the primary vote, enough to take the seat off the Country Party without the need for preferences. He was Minister for Works and Housing in Ben Chifley's November 1946 ministry. In that role, he was responsible for the commencement of the construction of the Snowy Mountains Scheme, a complex of dams, power stations and tunnels in southern New South Wales to produce hydroelectric power and divert water for irrigation to inland areas along the Murray and Murrumbidgee Rivers. He chose William Hudson as Commissioner of the Snowy Mountains Hydro-electric Authority and refused to follow the normal procedure of putting forward three alternatives to cabinet. Lemmon was also responsible for commencing a substantial program of construction of houses for ex-servicemen returned from World War II.

Lemmon's tenure in cabinet ended with his defeat at the 1949 election, in which he lost to Liberal Gordon Freeth despite being well ahead on the primary vote. However, on the third count, preferences from Country Party candidate and war hero Arnold Potts flowed overwhelmingly to Freeth, allowing Freeth to defeat Lemmon from third place on the primary vote.

At the 1954 election, he won the New South Wales seat of St George from Bill Graham and there was press speculation that he would run for Labor leadership. However, the Labor Party split in 1954 and Nelson lost to Graham at the 1955 election.

He was one of only a small number of people who have represented more than one state or territory in the Parliament.

== Later life ==
Lemmon returned to being a horse trainer and breeder in Robertson, New South Wales. He died on 20 March 1989, at Port Macquarie, NSW, the last surviving member of the Chifley Cabinet. He was survived by his wife and a son and a daughter.

Political offices
Preceded by Bert Lazzarini	Minister for Works and Housing; 1946–1949	Succeeded by Richard Casey
Parliament of Australia
Preceded by John Prowse	Member for Forrest; 1943–1949	Succeeded by Gordon Freeth
Preceded by Bill Graham	Member for St George; 1954–1955	Succeeded by Bill Graham
