= William Jack (Australian politician) =

Australian politician

William Jack OBE
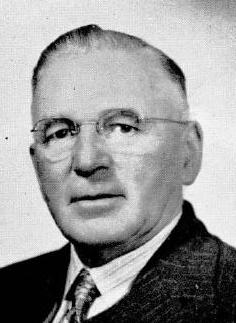

Member of the Australian Parliament for North Sydney
- In office 10 December 1949 – 31 October 1966
- Preceded by: Billy Hughes
- Succeeded by: Bill Graham

Personal details
- Born: 1 May 1890 Dundee, Scotland
- Died: 14 September 1982 (aged 92) Sydney, New South Wales, Australia
- Party: Liberal Party of Australia
- Occupation: Grocer

William Mathers Jack, OBE (1 May 1890 – 14 September 1982), known as "Silent Billy", was an Australian politician. Born in Dundee in Scotland, where he became an apprentice grocer at the age of 14, he migrated to Australia in 1912. After arrival in Australia, Jack became a grocer and businessman in North Sydney, and was elected to Willoughby Council.

In 1949, he was elected to the Australian House of Representatives as the Liberal member for North Sydney, a position he held until his retirement in 1966. During his parliamentary service, Jack earned the sobriquet "Silent Billy" because he only made five speeches in the House in 17 years, including his maiden and farewell speeches.

On 29 August 1962, he commenced his first speech in seven years with the words: I can remain silent no longer.

However, he was a very popular local member, noted for his strong constituent service, and retired without having lost an election. In the New Year Honours of 1968, he was appointed an Officer of the Order of the British Empire for services to the Parliament and the community.

Jack died in 1982.

Parliament of Australia
Preceded by Billy Hughes	Member for North Sydney; 1949–1966	Succeeded by Bill Graham
