= No. 2 Air Ambulance Unit RAAF =

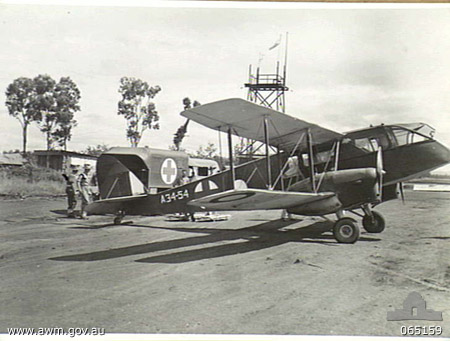
A No. 2 Air Ambulance Unit aircraft at Mareeba, Queensland in March 1944

No. 2 Air Ambulance Unit RAAF was a Royal Australian Air Force air ambulance unit of World War II. The Unit was formed on 1 March 1942 at RAAF Base Fairbairn and flew its first operational sortie on 7 March. No. 2 Air Ambulance Unit operated throughout Australia during 1942 and began flights to New Guinea in 1943.

Although it remained based in Australia, No. 2 Air Ambulance Unit supported the Allied forces engaged in the New Guinea campaign until the end of the war. Following the end of the war the Unit flew Australian prisoners of war home until November 1945 when its aircraft were transferred to No. 36 Squadron's Air Ambulance Flight. No. 2 Air Ambulance Unit was disbanded on 8 December 1945.
