= Stephen Dubois =

Australian retired politician

Member of the Australian Parliament for St George
- In office 1 December 1984 – 8 February 1993
- Preceded by: Bill Morrison
- Succeeded by: Seat abolished

Personal details
- Born: 1 February 1940 (age 86) Vanuatu
- Party: Australian Labor Party
- Occupation: Political staffer

Stephen Cairfield Dubois (born 1 February 1940) is an Australian retired politician. Born in Vanuatu, he was the legislative assistant to Labor MP Bill Morrison. In 1984, Morrison retired, and Dubois succeeded him in the seat of St George in the Australian House of Representatives, also representing the Labor Party. He held the seat until its abolition in 1993, at which time he retired after losing a preselection contest for the new seat of Watson to Leo McLeay who was then the Speaker of the House of Representatives.

Parliament of Australia
Preceded by Bill Morrison	Member for St George; 1984–1993	Succeeded by Seat abolished
