= Maurice Neil =

Australian politician, soldier and lawyer

Maurice Neil KC

Member of the Australian Parliament for St George
- In office 13 December 1975 – 18 October 1980
- Preceded by: Bill Morrison
- Succeeded by: Bill Morrison

Personal details
- Born: 29 May 1944 (age 82) Manchester, England
- Party: Liberal Party of Australia
- Occupation: Barrister

Maurice James Neil KC (born 29 May 1944) is an Australian politician, soldier and lawyer. Born in Manchester, England, he migrated to Australia at the age of 5. Neil attended the University of Sydney. He served in the military 1966–75, including voluntary time in Vietnam as a platoon commander in the Royal Australian Infantry.

Afterwards, he became a barrister, practising at the New South Wales Bar from 1971. Neil became a Queen's Counsel in 1985. He was the head of his previous floor and is currently a member of 11 Garfield Barwick Chambers in Sydney. Maurice also served as a migration officer for New South Wales in London. He was a member of the board of trustees of the Australian War Memorial from 31 August 1976 to 30 June 1980 and a member of the council of trustees of the Australian War Memorial from 1 July 1980 to 30 June 1981. He also served on the NSW Council for the Ageing, the NSW Council for Civil Liberties and the Australian branch of the International Commission of Jurists.

== Parliamentary career ==
In 1975, he was pre-selected as Liberal Party candidate for the Labor held federal seat of St. George, in Sydney's Southern suburbs, from a strong field of eleven candidates. In the subsequent federal election, in December 1975, he was elected to the Australian House of Representatives as the Liberal member for St George, narrowly defeating Labor's Bill Morrison by 56 votes, after distribution of preferences.
In the 1977 federal election, despite an adverse electorate boundary redistribution, he withstood a challenge from the previous member for Grayndler, Tony Whitlam, to retain St. George with an increased majority of 2665 votes, after distribution of preferences.
Neil was defeated by Morrison in the 1980 election.

Parliament of Australia
Preceded by Bill Morrison	Member for St George; 1975 – 1980	Succeeded by Bill Morrison
