= Bill Morrison (politician) =

Australian politician

The Honourable Bill Morrison AO
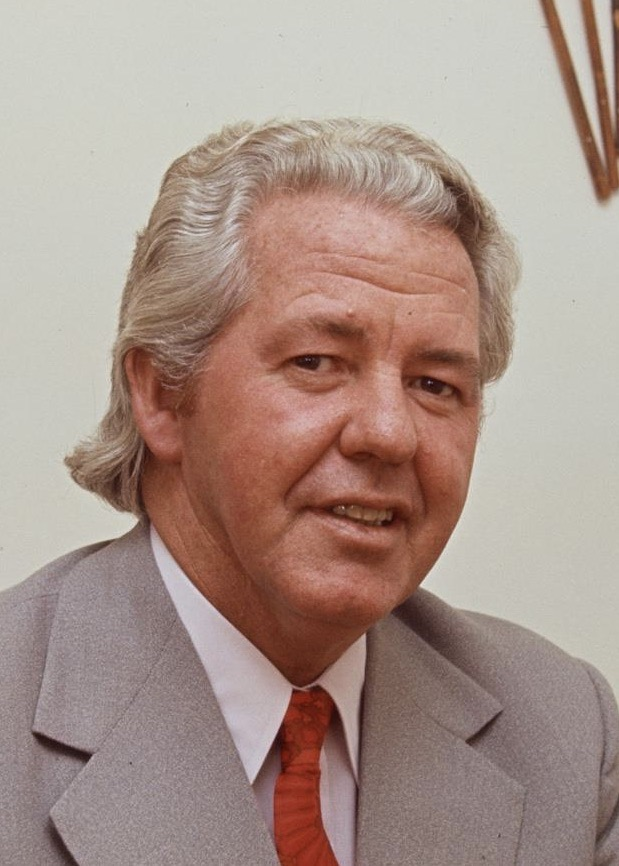
- Morrison in March 1973

Minister for Defence
- In office 6 June 1975 – 11 November 1975
- Prime Minister: Gough Whitlam
- Preceded by: Lance Barnard
- Succeeded by: James Killen

Minister for Science
- In office 19 December 1972 – 6 June 1975
- Prime Minister: Gough Whitlam
- Preceded by: Gough Whitlam
- Succeeded by: Clyde Cameron

Minister for External Territories
- In office 19 December 1972 – 30 November 1973
- Prime Minister: Gough Whitlam
- Preceded by: Gough Whitlam
- Succeeded by: None

Member of the Australian Parliament for St George
- In office 18 October 1980 – 26 October 1984
- Preceded by: Maurice Neil
- Succeeded by: Stephen Dubois
- In office 25 October 1969 – 13 December 1975
- Preceded by: Len Bosman
- Succeeded by: Maurice Neil

Personal details
- Born: 3 November 1928 Lithgow, New South Wales, Australia
- Died: 15 February 2013 (aged 84) Bardwell Valley, New South Wales, Australia
- Party: Labor
- Spouse: Marty Hessell (m. 1958)
- Children: 3
- Occupation: Diplomat

William Lawrence Morrison AO (3 November 1928 – 15 February 2013) was an Australian politician and diplomat. He was a member of the Australian Labor Party (ALP) and held ministerial office in the Whitlam government as Minister for External Territories (1972–1973), Science (1972–1975), and Defence (1975). He had been a member of the diplomatic service before entering politics, and later served a term as Ambassador to Indonesia (1985–1989).

== Early life ==
Morrison was born in Lithgow, New South Wales and graduated with an honours degree in economics from the University of Sydney in 1949. He was a diplomat in the Department of External Affairs from 1950 to 1969, with postings to London, Moscow, Washington, D.C., Bangkok and Kuala Lumpur. His posting to Moscow was terminated by the expulsion of the entire mission in 1954 as a result of the Petrov Affair. His posting to Malaysia was as Deputy High Commissioner. In 1958, he married Marty Hessell, an American citizen, in Bangkok.

== Political career ==
In 1969 Morrison resigned from the diplomatic service to successfully contest the seat of St George in the 1969 election for the Australian Labor Party. In 1969 he was elected deputy chairman of the Joint Parliamentary Foreign Affairs Committee and chairman of the Sub-committee on Australia's Relations with Indonesia of that committee. He also became a member of the Select Committee on Aircraft Noise, a matter of relevance to his electorate, which was close to Sydney Airport. Following the election of the Whitlam government in 1972 Morrison was appointed Minister for External Territories and Minister for Science in the Second Whitlam Ministry. With the granting of self-government to Australia's main external territory, Papua New Guinea, on 1 December 1973, the position of Minister for External Territories was abolished and he became Minister assisting the Minister for Foreign Affairs in matters relating to Papua New Guinea. From 6 June 1975, he was Minister for Defence and Minister assisting the Minister for Foreign Affairs in matters relating to the Islands of the Pacific. He was Minister for Defence during Indonesia's invasion of East Timor. He lost his seat in the 1975 election.

Morrison was a visiting fellow at the Australian National University in 1976 and a research fellow at the University of New South Wales from 1979 to 1980. In the 1980 election, he was re-elected to Parliament as the member for St George. He became a member of the Joint Parliamentary Foreign Affairs and Defence Committee and Deputy Chairman of its Defence Sub-committee. In 1983, he was elected as chairman of the Foreign Affairs and Defence Committee. He did not stand for re-election in 1984.

== Later life ==
In 1985, Morrison was appointed Ambassador to Indonesia. In 1988, he was made an Officer of the Order of Australia for service to the Commonwealth Parliament and to international relations. He retired in 1989.

Morrison was a councillor of Rockdale Council in the early 1990s. In 2005, he tried to restore the reputation of Mamdouh Habib. In May 2007, he was a witness to an inquest into the death of one of the Balibo Five, Brian Peters.

Political offices
Preceded by Gough Whitlam	Minister for External Territories; 1972–1973	Abolished
Preceded by Gough Whitlam	Minister for Science; 1972–1975	Succeeded by Clyde Cameron
New title	Minister Assisting the Minister for Foreign Affairs in matters relating to Papua New Guinea; 1973–1975	Abolished
New title	Minister Assisting the Minister for Foreign Affairs in matters relating to the Islands of the Pacific; 1975	Abolished
Preceded by Lance Barnard	Minister for Defence; 1975	Succeeded by James Killen
Parliament of Australia
Preceded by Len Bosman	Member for St George; 1969–1975	Succeeded by Maurice Neil
Preceded by Maurice Neil	Member for St George; 1980–1984	Succeeded by Stephen Dubois
Diplomatic posts
Preceded by Rawdon Dalrymple	Australian Ambassador to Indonesia; 1985–1989	Succeeded by Philip Flood
