= Len Bosman =

Australian politician (1924–2017)

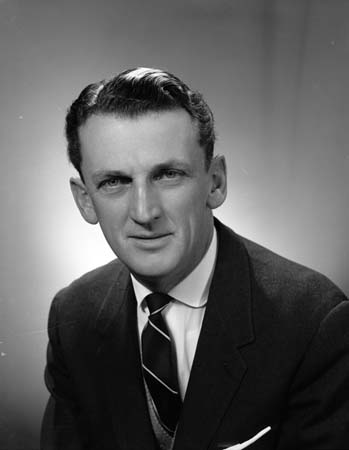

Member of the Australian Parliament for St George
- In office 30 November 1963 – 25 October 1969
- Preceded by: Lionel Clay
- Succeeded by: Bill Morrison

Personal details
- Born: 5 February 1924 Sydney
- Died: 6 February 2017 (aged 93)
- Party: Liberal Party of Australia
- Children: Anthony Bosman; Rodney Bosman; Lyndel Bosman
- Occupation: Businessman

Leonard Lewis "Len" Bosman (5 February 1924 – 6 February 2017) was an Australian politician.

Born in Sydney, he was educated at state schools and then at East Sydney Technical College. He owned a catering business before serving in World War II 1942–47. He was active in Apex and foreign aid organisations. In 1963, he was elected to the Australian House of Representatives as the Liberal member for St George. He held the seat until his defeat in 1969.

He died a day after his birthday in 2017 at the age of 93.

Parliament of Australia
Preceded by Lionel Clay	Member for St George; 1963–1969	Succeeded by Bill Morrison
