= Division of St George =

Former Australian federal electoral division

St George Australian House of Representatives Division
- Created: 1949
- Abolished: 1993
- Namesake: St George

The Division of St George was an Australian electoral division in the state of New South Wales. It was located in the southern suburbs of Sydney, and covered the suburbs of Hurstville, Rockdale and Arncliffe.

The Division was named after the Sydney district of St George. It was proclaimed at the redistribution of 11 May 1949. For most of its existence, it was a marginal seat that frequently changed hands between the Labor Party and the Liberal Party. Unlike some marginal seats, it was not considered a barometer for winning government; of its seven members (two of which held it on separate stints), four spent at least one term in opposition.

At the redistribution of 31 January 1992, it was abolished and replaced by the Division of Watson, named after Hon. Chris Watson, the first Labor Prime Minister of Australia.

== Members ==
Image	Member	Party	Term	Notes
	Bill Graham (1919–1995)	Liberal	10 December 1949 – 29 May 1954	Lost seat
	Nelson Lemmon (1908–1989)	Labor	29 May 1954 – 10 December 1955	Previously held the Division of Forrest. Lost seat
	Bill Graham (1919–1995)	Liberal	10 December 1955 – 22 November 1958	Lost seat. Later elected to the Division of North Sydney in 1966
	Lionel Clay (1900–1965)	Labor	22 November 1958 – 30 November 1963	Lost seat
	Len Bosman (1924–2017)	Liberal	30 November 1963 – 25 October 1969	Lost seat
	Bill Morrison (1928–2013)	Labor	25 October 1969 – 13 December 1975	Served as minister under Whitlam. Lost seat
	Maurice Neil (1944–)	Liberal	13 December 1975 – 18 October 1980	Lost seat
	Bill Morrison (1928–2013)	Labor	18 October 1980 – 26 October 1984	Retired
	Stephen Dubois (1940–)	Labor	1 December 1984 – 8 February 1993	Retired after St George was abolished in 1993
