= Lionel Clay =

Australian politician

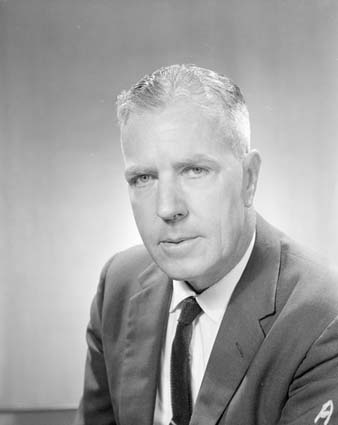

Member of the Australian Parliament for St George
- In office 2 November 1958 – 30 November 1963
- Preceded by: Bill Graham
- Succeeded by: Len Bosman

Personal details
- Born: 1900 Chillagoe, Queensland
- Died: 16 April 1965 (aged 64–65)
- Party: Australian Labor Party
- Occupation: Teacher, unionist

Lionel Daniel Clay (1900 – 16 April 1965) was an Australian politician. Born in Chillagoe, Queensland, he attended state schools before becoming a teacher and union organiser, rising to become vice-president of the Textile Workers Union. In 1958, he was elected to the Australian House of Representatives as the Labor member for the New South Wales seat of St George. He held the seat until his defeat in 1963. Clay died in 1965.

Parliament of Australia
Preceded by Bill Graham	Member for St George; 1958–1963	Succeeded by Len Bosman
