= 1972 Australian House of Representatives election =

This is a list of electoral division results for the Australian 1972 federal election.

== Overall ==
This section is an excerpt from 1972 Australian federal election § House of Representatives

House of Reps (IRV) — 1972–74—Turnout 95.38% (CV) — Informal 2.17%
| Party | Votes | % | Swing | Seats | Change |
|---|---|---|---|---|---|
| Labor | 3,273,549 | 49.59 | ▲+2.64 | 67 | +8 |
| Liberal–Country Coalition | 2,737,911 | 41.48 | ▼–1.84 | 58 | –8 |
| Liberal | 2,115,085 | 32.04 | ▼–2.73 | 38 | –8 |
| Country | 622,826 | 9.44 | ▲+0.88 | 20 | 0 |
| Democratic Labor | 346,415 | 5.25 | ▼–0.77 | 0 | 0 |
| Australia | 159,916 | 2.42 | ▲+1.54 | 0 | 0 |
| Defence of Government Schools | 9,703 | 0.15 | * | 0 | 0 |
| Communist | 8,105 | 0.12 | ▲+0.04 | 0 | 0 |
| National Socialist | 1,161 | 0.02 | * | 0 | 0 |
| Socialist | 1,062 | 0.02 | * | 0 | 0 |
| Independents | 63,228 | 0.96 | ▼–1.57 | 0 | 0 |
| Total | 6,601,050 | | | 125 | |
Two-party-preferred (estimated)
| Labor | Win | 52.70 | ▲+2.50 | 67 | +8 |
| Liberal–Country coalition | | 47.30 | ▼−2.50 | 58 | −8 |

Popular vote
| Labor | 49.59% |
| Liberal | 32.04% |
| Country | 9.44% |
| DLP | 5.25% |
| Australia | 2.42% |
| Other | 1.27% |

Two-party-preferred vote
| Labor | 52.70% |
| Coalition | 47.30% |

Parliament seats
| Labor | 53.60% |
| Coalition | 46.40% |

== New South Wales ==
1972 Australian federal election (New South Wales)
| ← 1969 | 2 December 1972 | 1974 → |

All 44 NSW seats in the House of Representatives 22 seats needed for a majority
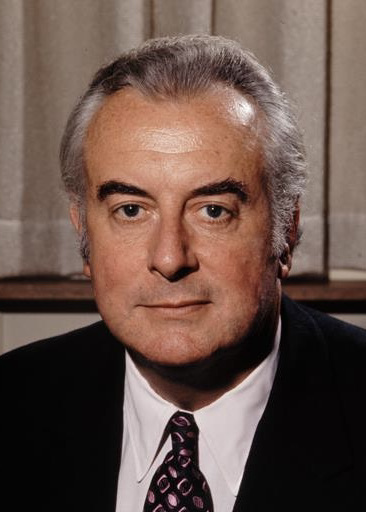

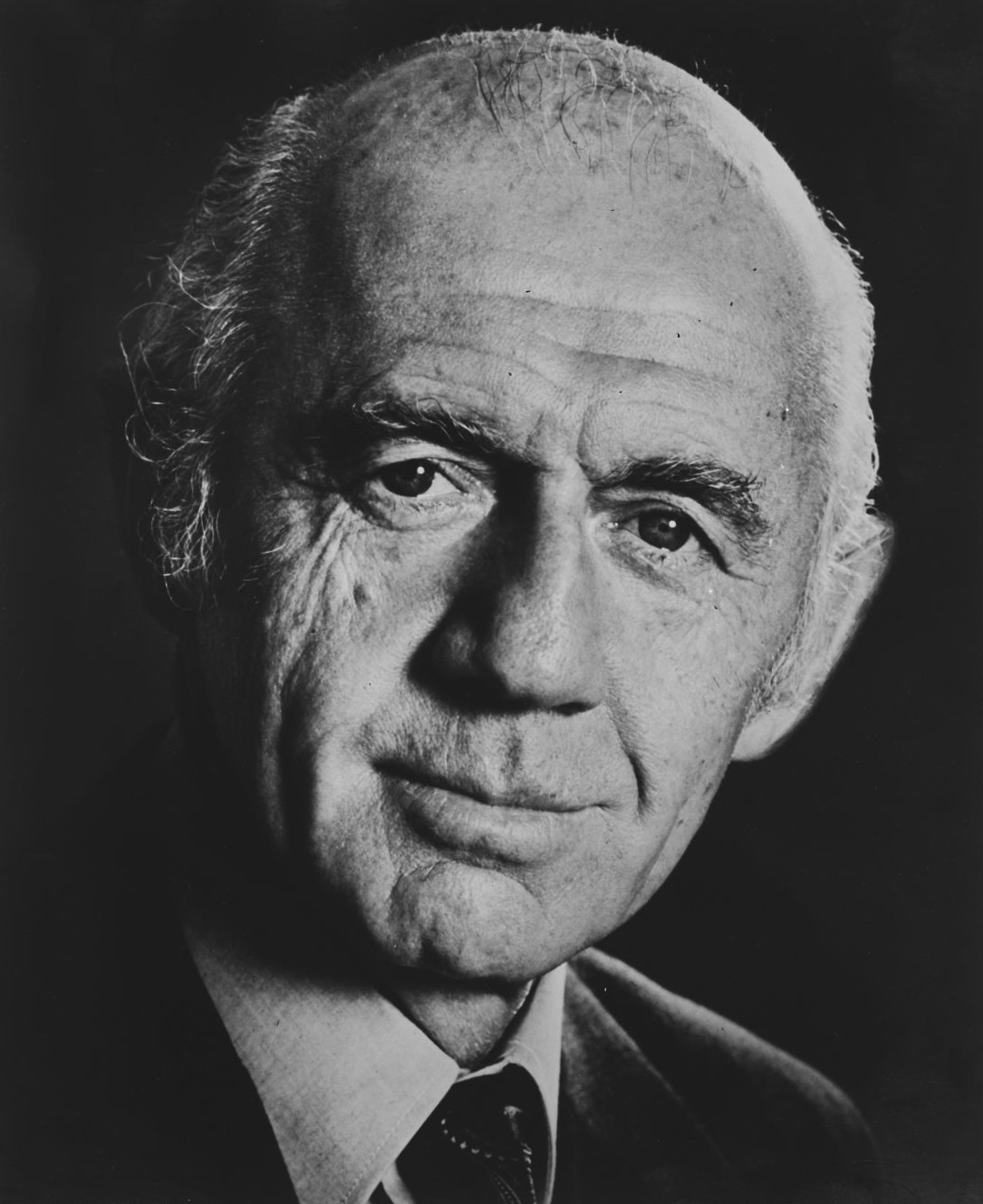
| | First party | Second party |
|---|---|---|
| Leader | Gough Whitlam | William McMahon |
| Party | Labor | Coalition |
| Seats before | 22 | 23 |
| Seats won | 27 | 17 |
| Seat change | ▲5 | ▼6 |
| Popular vote | 1,252,047 | 958,068 |
| Percentage | 51.9% | 39.8% |
| Swing | ▲4.2pp | ▼3.7pp |
| TPP | 55.4% | 44.6% |
| TPP swing | ▲3.8pp | ▼3.8pp |

=== Banks ===
This section is an excerpt from Electoral results for the Division of Banks § 1972

1972 Australian federal election: Banks
| Party | Candidate | Votes | % | ±% |
|---|---|---|---|---|
| Labor | Vince Martin | 31,620 | 58.7 | +7.5 |
| Liberal | Randall Green | 17,757 | 33.0 | +2.6 |
| Australia | Charles Nasmyth | 2,392 | 4.4 | +4.4 |
| Democratic Labor | John Anderson | 2,114 | 3.9 | +1.8 |
| Total formal votes | | 53,882 | 98.6 | +0.9 |
| Informal votes | | 738 | 1.4 | −0.9 |
| Turnout | | 54,620 | 96.6 | −0.1 |
Two-party-preferred result
| Labor | Vince Martin | | 61.9 | −0.1 |
| Liberal | Randall Green | | 38.1 | +0.1 |
| Labor hold | | Swing | −0.1 | |

=== Barton ===
This section is an excerpt from Electoral results for the Division of Barton § 1972

1972 Australian federal election: Barton
| Party | Candidate | Votes | % | ±% |
|---|---|---|---|---|
| Labor | Len Reynolds | 29,931 | 52.8 | +2.3 |
| Liberal | Vince Bruce | 23,306 | 41.1 | −2.0 |
| Australia | Rhonda Howse | 2,255 | 4.0 | +4.0 |
| Democratic Labor | Bruce Stafford | 877 | 1.5 | −0.7 |
| Independent | Brian Howard | 348 | 0.6 | +0.6 |
| Total formal votes | | 56,717 | 98.5 | |
| Informal votes | | 860 | 1.5 | |
| Turnout | | 57,577 | 96.4 | |
Two-party-preferred result
| Labor | Len Reynolds | | 55.8 | +2.8 |
| Liberal | Vince Bruce | | 44.2 | −2.8 |
| Labor hold | | Swing | +2.8 | |

=== Bennelong ===
This section is an excerpt from Electoral results for the Division of Bennelong § 1972

1972 Australian federal election: Bennelong
| Party | Candidate | Votes | % | ±% |
|---|---|---|---|---|
| Liberal | Sir John Cramer | 27,113 | 46.0 | −2.6 |
| Labor | Norman Russell | 22,534 | 38.2 | +1.5 |
| Australia | Claudia Leach | 6,212 | 10.5 | +4.8 |
| Democratic Labor | Gwen Fitzpatrick | 2,040 | 3.5 | −1.0 |
| Defence of Government Schools | Jean Sulima | 1,061 | 1.8 | +1.8 |
| Total formal votes | | 58,960 | 98.4 | |
| Informal votes | | 977 | 1.6 | |
| Turnout | | 59,937 | 94.7 | |
Two-party-preferred result
| Liberal | Sir John Cramer | 30,879 | 52.4 | −4.4 |
| Labor | Norman Russell | 28,081 | 47.6 | +4.4 |
| Liberal hold | | Swing | −4.4 | |

=== Berowra ===
This section is an excerpt from Electoral results for the Division of Berowra § 1972

1972 Australian federal election: Berowra
| Party | Candidate | Votes | % | ±% |
|---|---|---|---|---|
| Liberal | Harry Edwards | 29,993 | 53.5 | +8.0 |
| Labor | George Williams | 19,260 | 34.4 | +3.8 |
| Australia | David Haig | 4,733 | 8.4 | +1.5 |
| Democratic Labor | Michael Strenger | 2,055 | 3.7 | −0.9 |
| Total formal votes | | 56,041 | 98.8 | |
| Informal votes | | 693 | 1.2 | |
| Turnout | | 56,734 | 95.5 | |
Two-party-preferred result
| Liberal | Harry Edwards | | 59.8 | +0.3 |
| Labor | George Williams | | 40.2 | −0.3 |
| Liberal hold | | Swing | +0.3 | |

=== Blaxland ===
This section is an excerpt from Electoral results for the Division of Blaxland § 1972

1972 Australian federal election: Blaxland
| Party | Candidate | Votes | % | ±% |
|---|---|---|---|---|
| Labor | Paul Keating | 36,724 | 66.7 | +5.0 |
| Liberal | John Ghent | 16,317 | 29.6 | −2.1 |
| Democratic Labor | Anthony Young | 2,020 | 3.7 | −2.9 |
| Total formal votes | | 55,061 | 97.8 | |
| Informal votes | | 1,231 | 2.2 | |
| Turnout | | 56,292 | 95.3 | |
Two-party-preferred result
| Labor | Paul Keating | | 67.4 | +4.6 |
| Liberal | John Ghent | | 32.6 | −4.6 |
| Labor hold | | Swing | +4.6 | |

=== Bradfield ===
This section is an excerpt from Electoral results for the Division of Bradfield § 1972

1972 Australian federal election: Bradfield
| Party | Candidate | Votes | % | ±% |
|---|---|---|---|---|
| Liberal | Harry Turner | 36,378 | 61.3 | −1.7 |
| Labor | John Pomeroy | 13,458 | 22.7 | −0.1 |
| Australia | Mavis McMillan | 4,876 | 8.2 | +4.0 |
| Democratic Labor | Allan Dwyer | 2,412 | 4.1 | −1.6 |
| Independent | Helen Berrill | 2,251 | 3.8 | +3.8 |
| Total formal votes | | 59,375 | 99.0 | |
| Informal votes | | 607 | 1.0 | |
| Turnout | | 59,982 | 95.3 | |
Two-party-preferred result
| Liberal | Harry Turner | | 69.3 | −2.1 |
| Labor | John Pomeroy | | 30.7 | +2.1 |
| Liberal hold | | Swing | −2.1 | |

=== Calare ===
This section is an excerpt from Electoral results for the Division of Calare § 1972

1972 Australian federal election: Calare
| Party | Candidate | Votes | % | ±% |
|---|---|---|---|---|
| Country | John England | 23,517 | 51.5 | −1.0 |
| Labor | Francis Hall | 19,748 | 43.2 | +1.9 |
| Democratic Labor | John Grant | 2,443 | 5.3 | −0.9 |
| Total formal votes | | 45,708 | 99.2 | |
| Informal votes | | 388 | 0.8 | |
| Turnout | | 46,096 | 96.5 | |
Two-party-preferred result
| Country | John England | | 55.7 | −1.8 |
| Labor | Francis Hall | | 44.3 | +1.8 |
| Country hold | | Swing | −1.8 | |

=== Chifley ===
This section is an excerpt from Electoral results for the Division of Chifley § 1972

1972 Australian federal election: Chifley
| Party | Candidate | Votes | % | ±% |
|---|---|---|---|---|
| Labor | John Armitage | 45,656 | 71.5 | +9.6 |
| Liberal | Alan Calaby | 14,720 | 23.0 | −3.3 |
| Democratic Labor | Francesco Rea | 3,504 | 5.5 | +2.2 |
| Total formal votes | | 63,880 | 97.3 | |
| Informal votes | | 1,758 | 2.7 | |
| Turnout | | 65,638 | 95.3 | |
Two-party-preferred result
| Labor | John Armitage | | 72.6 | +5.8 |
| Liberal | Alan Calaby | | 27.4 | −5.8 |
| Labor hold | | Swing | +5.8 | |

=== Cook ===
This section is an excerpt from Electoral results for the Division of Cook § 1972

1972 Australian federal election: Cook
| Party | Candidate | Votes | % | ±% |
|---|---|---|---|---|
| Labor | Ray Thorburn | 25,037 | 46.5 | +2.9 |
| Liberal | Don Dobie | 24,527 | 45.5 | −3.6 |
| Australia | Marjorie Gray | 2,230 | 4.1 | +2.3 |
| Democratic Labor | Bernard Forshaw | 1,232 | 2.3 | +2.3 |
| Defence of Government Schools | Judith Sainsbury | 674 | 1.3 | +1.3 |
| Independent | Ronald Gallagher | 153 | 0.3 | +0.3 |
| Total formal votes | | 53,853 | 98.5 | |
| Informal votes | | 800 | 1.5 | |
| Turnout | | 54,653 | 96.5 | |
Two-party-preferred result
| Labor | Ray Thorburn | 27,298 | 50.7 | +3.5 |
| Liberal | Don Dobie | 26,555 | 49.3 | −3.5 |
| Labor gain from Liberal | | Swing | +3.5 | |

=== Cowper ===
This section is an excerpt from Electoral results for the Division of Cowper § 1972

1972 Australian federal election: Cowper
| Party | Candidate | Votes | % | ±% |
|---|---|---|---|---|
| Country | Ian Robinson | 23,437 | 49.4 | −13.5 |
| Labor | Thomas Cronin | 21,235 | 44.8 | +44.8 |
| Australia | John Maynes | 1,410 | 3.0 | +3.0 |
| Democratic Labor | David Cumming | 1,349 | 2.8 | +2.8 |
| Total formal votes | | 47,431 | 98.7 | |
| Informal votes | | 633 | 1.3 | |
| Turnout | | 48,064 | 96.2 | |
Two-party-preferred result
| Country | Ian Robinson | | 52.5 | −13.0 |
| Labor | Thomas Cronin | | 47.5 | +47.5 |
| Country hold | | Swing | −13.0 | |

=== Cunningham ===
This section is an excerpt from Electoral results for the Division of Cunningham § 1972

1972 Australian federal election: Cunningham
| Party | Candidate | Votes | % | ±% |
|---|---|---|---|---|
| Labor | Rex Connor | 38,306 | 64.4 | +0.4 |
| Liberal | John Poel | 15,524 | 26.1 | −7.9 |
| Australia | John Sladek | 2,962 | 5.0 | +5.0 |
| Democratic Labor | Peter Daly | 1,968 | 3.3 | +3.3 |
| Communist | Reg Wilding | 692 | 1.2 | −0.9 |
| Total formal votes | | 59,452 | 96.8 | |
| Informal votes | | 1,981 | 3.2 | |
| Turnout | | 61,433 | 95.6 | |
Two-party-preferred result
| Labor | Rex Connor | | 69.1 | +3.2 |
| Liberal | John Poel | | 30.9 | −3.2 |
| Labor hold | | Swing | +3.2 | |

=== Darling ===
This section is an excerpt from Electoral results for the Division of Darling § 1972

1972 Australian federal election: Darling
| Party | Candidate | Votes | % | ±% |
|---|---|---|---|---|
| Labor | John FitzPatrick | 25,310 | 61.0 | +3.5 |
| Country | Max Overton | 9,360 | 22.5 | −1.0 |
| Liberal | James Donohoe | 4,029 | 9.7 | −9.3 |
| Democratic Labor | John Darcy | 2,826 | 6.8 | +6.8 |
| Total formal votes | | 41,525 | 98.4 | |
| Informal votes | | 682 | 1.6 | |
| Turnout | | 42,207 | 95.1 | |
Two-party-preferred result
| Labor | John FitzPatrick | | 63.1 | +2.8 |
| Country | Max Overton | | 36.9 | −2.8 |
| Labor hold | | Swing | +2.8 | |

=== Eden-Monaro ===
This section is an excerpt from Electoral results for the Division of Eden-Monaro § 1972

1972 Australian federal election: Eden-Monaro
| Party | Candidate | Votes | % | ±% |
|---|---|---|---|---|
| Labor | Bob Whan | 23,836 | 47.6 | −3.6 |
| Liberal | Doug Otton | 12,074 | 24.1 | −20.5 |
| Country | Roy Howard | 11,313 | 22.6 | +22.6 |
| Democratic Labor | Anthony Abbey | 1,721 | 3.4 | +0.5 |
| Australia | Hugh Watson | 1,091 | 2.2 | +0.9 |
| Total formal votes | | 50,035 | 98.3 | |
| Informal votes | | 878 | 1.7 | |
| Turnout | | 50,913 | 96.6 | |
Two-party-preferred result
| Labor | Bob Whan | 25,269 | 50.5 | −2.7 |
| Country | Roy Howard | 24,766 | 49.5 | +49.5 |
| Labor hold | | Swing | −2.7 | |

=== Evans ===
This section is an excerpt from Electoral results for the Division of Evans § 1972

1972 Australian federal election: Evans
| Party | Candidate | Votes | % | ±% |
|---|---|---|---|---|
| Labor | Allan Mulder | 25,623 | 48.2 | +2.8 |
| Liberal | Malcolm Mackay | 21,453 | 40.4 | −4.0 |
| Australia | John Dease | 2,644 | 5.0 | +2.1 |
| Independent | Noel MacDonald | 1,714 | 3.2 | +3.2 |
| Democratic Labor | Gary Doherty | 1,705 | 3.2 | −2.1 |
| Total formal votes | | 53,139 | 97.2 | |
| Informal votes | | 1,536 | 2.8 | |
| Turnout | | 54,675 | 94.3 | |
Two-party-preferred result
| Labor | Allan Mulder | 28,021 | 52.7 | +3.9 |
| Liberal | Malcolm Mackay | 25,118 | 47.3 | −3.9 |
| Labor gain from Liberal | | Swing | +3.9 | |

=== Farrer ===
This section is an excerpt from Electoral results for the Division of Farrer § 1972

1972 Australian federal election: Farrer
| Party | Candidate | Votes | % | ±% |
|---|---|---|---|---|
| Liberal | David Fairbairn | 24,096 | 47.9 | −7.0 |
| Labor | Kevin Esler | 19,276 | 38.3 | +6.0 |
| Democratic Labor | Anthony Quinn | 3,531 | 7.0 | −0.4 |
| Australia | Mike Donelan | 3,394 | 6.7 | +6.7 |
| Total formal votes | | 50,297 | 98.7 | |
| Informal votes | | 653 | 1.3 | |
| Turnout | | 50,950 | 95.9 | |
Two-party-preferred result
| Liberal | David Fairbairn | 28,145 | 56.0 | −7.5 |
| Labor | Kevin Esler | 22,152 | 44.0 | +7.5 |
| Liberal hold | | Swing | −7.5 | |

=== Grayndler ===
This section is an excerpt from Electoral results for the Division of Grayndler § 1972

1972 Australian federal election: Grayndler
| Party | Candidate | Votes | % | ±% |
|---|---|---|---|---|
| Labor | Fred Daly | 34,768 | 73.7 | +1.8 |
| Liberal | Jonathan Fowler | 10,067 | 21.3 | −6.7 |
| Democratic Labor | Anthony Kiely | 2,318 | 4.9 | +4.9 |
| Total formal votes | | 47,153 | 96.2 | |
| Informal votes | | 1,861 | 3.8 | |
| Turnout | | 49,014 | 93.0 | |
Two-party-preferred result
| Labor | Fred Daly | | 74.7 | +2.8 |
| Liberal | Jonathan Fowler | | 25.3 | −2.8 |
| Labor hold | | Swing | +2.8 | |

=== Gwydir ===
This section is an excerpt from Electoral results for the Division of Gwydir § 1972

1972 Australian federal election: Gwydir
| Party | Candidate | Votes | % | ±% |
|---|---|---|---|---|
| Country | Ralph Hunt | 22,979 | 50.2 | +0.2 |
| Labor | Robert Downing | 19,896 | 43.4 | −0.9 |
| Democratic Labor | John Gough | 1,532 | 3.3 | +3.3 |
| Australia | Kevin Mapperson | 1,083 | 2.4 | −2.0 |
| Independent | William O'Donnell | 324 | 0.7 | +0.7 |
| Total formal votes | | 45,814 | 98.1 | |
| Informal votes | | 865 | 1.9 | |
| Turnout | | 46,679 | 96.0 | |
Two-party-preferred result
| Country | Ralph Hunt | | 54.2 | +1.2 |
| Labor | Robert Downing | | 45.8 | −1.2 |
| Country hold | | Swing | +1.2 | |

=== Hughes ===
This section is an excerpt from Electoral results for the Division of Hughes § 1972

1972 Australian federal election: Hughes
| Party | Candidate | Votes | % | ±% |
|---|---|---|---|---|
| Labor | Les Johnson | 35,849 | 66.5 | +5.2 |
| Liberal | Eric Blain | 16,399 | 30.4 | +1.4 |
| Democratic Labor | William Goslett | 1,643 | 3.0 | −0.2 |
| Total formal votes | | 53,891 | 98.7 | |
| Informal votes | | 719 | 1.3 | |
| Turnout | | 54,610 | 96.4 | |
Two-party-preferred result
| Labor | Les Johnson | | 67.1 | +1.1 |
| Liberal | Eric Blain | | 32.9 | −1.1 |
| Labor hold | | Swing | +1.1 | |

=== Hume ===
This section is an excerpt from Electoral results for the Division of Hume § 1972

1972 Australian federal election: Hume
| Party | Candidate | Votes | % | ±% |
|---|---|---|---|---|
| Labor | Frank Olley | 22,364 | 50.1 | +4.0 |
| Country | Ian Pettitt | 20,005 | 44.8 | −1.7 |
| Democratic Labor | John Hogan | 2,273 | 5.1 | −2.3 |
| Total formal votes | | 44,642 | 99.3 | |
| Informal votes | | 330 | 0.7 | |
| Turnout | | 44,972 | 96.5 | |
Two-party-preferred result
| Labor | Frank Olley | | 51.9 | +2.9 |
| Country | Ian Pettitt | | 48.1 | −2.9 |
| Labor gain from Country | | Swing | +2.9 | |

=== Hunter ===
This section is an excerpt from Electoral results for the Division of Hunter § 1972

1972 Australian federal election: Hunter
| Party | Candidate | Votes | % | ±% |
|---|---|---|---|---|
| Labor | Bert James | 40,631 | 75.1 | +1.6 |
| Liberal | Stanley Gumbleton | 13,436 | 24.9 | −1.6 |
| Total formal votes | | 54,067 | 98.1 | |
| Informal votes | | 1,041 | 1.9 | |
| Turnout | | 55,108 | 96.8 | |
| Labor hold | | Swing | +1.6 | |

=== Kingsford Smith ===
This section is an excerpt from Electoral results for the Division of Kingsford Smith § 1972

1972 Australian federal election: Kingsford-Smith
| Party | Candidate | Votes | % | ±% |
|---|---|---|---|---|
| Labor | Lionel Bowen | 26,443 | 66.9 | +8.1 |
| Liberal | Ronald Scott | 14,969 | 27.5 | −3.9 |
| Democratic Labor | Graham Bennett | 3,088 | 5.7 | +0.2 |
| Total formal votes | | 54,500 | 97.7 | |
| Informal votes | | 1,275 | 2.3 | |
| Turnout | | 55,775 | 95.0 | |
Two-party-preferred result
| Labor | Lionel Bowen | | 68.8 | +5.9 |
| Liberal | Ronald Scott | | 31.2 | −5.9 |
| Labor hold | | Swing | +5.9 | |

=== Lang ===
This section is an excerpt from Electoral results for the Division of Lang § 1972

1972 Australian federal election: Lang
| Party | Candidate | Votes | % | ±% |
|---|---|---|---|---|
| Labor | Frank Stewart | 33,274 | 63.8 | +5.4 |
| Liberal | Stanley Duncan | 16,700 | 32.0 | −1.6 |
| Democratic Labor | Robert Burke | 2,167 | 4.2 | +0.8 |
| Total formal votes | | 52,141 | 98.1 | |
| Informal votes | | 1,006 | 1.9 | |
| Turnout | | 53,147 | 94.7 | |
Two-party-preferred result
| Labor | Frank Stewart | | 64.4 | +2.7 |
| Liberal | Stanley Duncan | | 33.6 | −2.7 |
| Labor hold | | Swing | +2.7 | |

=== Lowe ===
This section is an excerpt from Electoral results for the Division of Lowe § 1972

1972 Australian federal election: Lowe
| Party | Candidate | Votes | % | ±% |
|---|---|---|---|---|
| Liberal | William McMahon | 25,971 | 48.7 | +0.5 |
| Labor | Bill Fisher | 22,879 | 42.9 | +1.8 |
| Australia | John Steele | 1,892 | 3.5 | +3.5 |
| Democratic Labor | Agnes Bannon | 1,378 | 2.6 | −0.2 |
| Defence of Government Schools | Kathleen Taylor | 545 | 1.0 | +1.0 |
| Independent | Marc Aussie-Stone | 312 | 0.6 | +0.6 |
| Independent | David Widdup | 207 | 0.4 | +0.4 |
| Independent | John Morgan | 87 | 0.2 | +0.2 |
| Independent | Sandor Torzsok | 33 | 0.1 | +0.1 |
| Total formal votes | | 53,304 | 97.1 | |
| Informal votes | | 1,578 | 2.9 | |
| Turnout | | 54,882 | 93.5 | |
Two-party-preferred result
| Liberal | William McMahon | | 53.0 | −1.9 |
| Labor | Bill Fisher | | 47.0 | +1.9 |
| Liberal hold | | Swing | −1.9 | |

=== Lyne ===
This section is an excerpt from Electoral results for the Division of Lyne § 1972

1972 Australian federal election: Lyne
| Party | Candidate | Votes | % | ±% |
|---|---|---|---|---|
| Country | Philip Lucock | 24,633 | 51.0 | −7.8 |
| Labor | Peter Carney | 20,619 | 42.7 | +7.2 |
| Democratic Labor | Jack Collins | 1,550 | 3.2 | +3.2 |
| Australia | Stephanie Thew | 1,204 | 2.5 | −1.0 |
| Independent | Joe Cordner | 286 | 0.6 | −1.6 |
| Total formal votes | | 48,292 | 98.7 | |
| Informal votes | | 659 | 1.3 | |
| Turnout | | 58,591 | 96.4 | |
Two-party-preferred result
| Country | Philip Lucock | | 54.9 | −6.4 |
| Labor | Peter Carney | | 45.1 | +6.4 |
| Country hold | | Swing | −6.4 | |

=== Macarthur ===
This section is an excerpt from Electoral results for the Division of Macarthur § 1972

1972 Australian federal election: Macarthur
| Party | Candidate | Votes | % | ±% |
|---|---|---|---|---|
| Labor | John Kerin | 30,257 | 48.3 | +5.9 |
| Liberal | Max Dunbier | 18,118 | 28.9 | −22.1 |
| Independent | Jeff Bate | 11,322 | 18.1 | +18.1 |
| Independent | Dianne Allen | 1,706 | 2.7 | +2.7 |
| Democratic Labor | Edwardus Himmelreich | 1,101 | 1.8 | +1.8 |
| Independent | Stephen Quilkey | 123 | 0.2 | +0.2 |
| Total formal votes | | 62,627 | 97.9 | |
| Informal votes | | 1,325 | 2.1 | |
| Turnout | | 63,952 | 96.3 | |
Two-party-preferred result
| Labor | John Kerin | 32,706 | 52.2 | +6.0 |
| Liberal | Max Dunbier | 29,921 | 47.8 | −6.0 |
| Labor gain from Liberal | | Swing | +6.0 | |

=== Mackellar ===
This section is an excerpt from Electoral results for the Division of Mackellar § 1972

1972 Australian federal election: Mackellar
| Party | Candidate | Votes | % | ±% |
|---|---|---|---|---|
| Liberal | Bill Wentworth | 28,677 | 48.1 | −8.6 |
| Labor | Evan Davies | 21,744 | 36.5 | −1.4 |
| Australia | Richard Jones | 6,956 | 11.7 | +11.7 |
| Democratic Labor | Thomas Colman | 1,971 | 3.3 | −2.1 |
| Independent | Norman Ward | 284 | 0.5 | +0.5 |
| Total formal votes | | 59,632 | 98.3 | |
| Informal votes | | 1,001 | 1.7 | |
| Turnout | | 60,633 | 94.8 | |
Two-party-preferred result
| Liberal | Bill Wentworth | | 55.2 | −5.8 |
| Labor | Evan Davies | | 44.8 | +5.8 |
| Liberal hold | | Swing | −5.8 | |

=== Macquarie ===
This section is an excerpt from Electoral results for the Division of Macquarie § 1972

1972 Australian federal election: Macquarie
| Party | Candidate | Votes | % | ±% |
|---|---|---|---|---|
| Labor | Tony Luchetti | 36,655 | 58.8 | +0.7 |
| Liberal | Basil Genders | 15,655 | 25.4 | −8.6 |
| Country | Frank Wolstenholme | 7,045 | 11.4 | +11.4 |
| Democratic Labor | Leslie Clarke | 2,652 | 4.3 | −1.1 |
| Total formal votes | | 61,595 | 98.6 | |
| Informal votes | | 892 | 1.4 | |
| Turnout | | 62,487 | 95.4 | |
Two-party-preferred result
| Labor | Tony Luchetti | | 60.6 | −2.0 |
| Liberal | Basil Genders | | 39.4 | +2.0 |
| Labor hold | | Swing | −2.0 | |

=== Mitchell ===
This section is an excerpt from Electoral results for the Division of Mitchell § 1972

1972 Australian federal election: Mitchell
| Party | Candidate | Votes | % | ±% |
|---|---|---|---|---|
| Labor | Alfred Ashley-Brown | 31,631 | 47.5 | +2.8 |
| Liberal | Les Irwin | 29,702 | 44.6 | −3.1 |
| Australia | Patricia Berzin | 2,729 | 4.1 | +1.8 |
| Democratic Labor | David Sanson | 1,925 | 2.9 | −0.4 |
| Independent | David McArthur | 329 | 0.5 | +0.5 |
| Independent | Ivor F | 226 | 0.3 | +0.3 |
| Total formal votes | | 66,542 | 97.6 | |
| Informal votes | | 1,646 | 2.4 | |
| Turnout | | 68,188 | 95.3 | |
Two-party-preferred result
| Labor | Alfred Ashley-Brown | 34,047 | 51.2 | +3.7 |
| Liberal | Les Irwin | 32,495 | 48.8 | −3.7 |
| Labor gain from Liberal | | Swing | +3.7 | |

=== New England ===
This section is an excerpt from Electoral results for the Division of New England § 1972

1972 Australian federal election: New England
| Party | Candidate | Votes | % | ±% |
|---|---|---|---|---|
| Country | Ian Sinclair | 25,158 | 49.2 | −9.9 |
| Labor | Justin Rowe | 20,577 | 40.3 | −0.6 |
| Australia | Brian Edwards | 3,084 | 6.0 | +6.0 |
| Democratic Labor | Edwin Taber | 2,284 | 4.5 | +4.5 |
| Total formal votes | | 51,103 | 99.0 | |
| Informal votes | | 530 | 1.0 | |
| Turnout | | 51,633 | 96.0 | |
Two-party-preferred result
| Country | Ian Sinclair | | 54.9 | −4.2 |
| Labor | Justin Rowe | | 45.1 | +4.2 |
| Country hold | | Swing | −4.2 | |

=== Newcastle ===
This section is an excerpt from Electoral results for the Division of Newcastle1972

1972 Australian federal election: Newcastle
| Party | Candidate | Votes | % | ±% |
|---|---|---|---|---|
| Labor | Charles Jones | 33,451 | 64.9 | +2.0 |
| Liberal | Malcolm Blackshaw | 14,683 | 28.5 | −5.7 |
| Communist | Harry Anderson | 1,951 | 3.8 | +3.8 |
| Democratic Labor | Robert Godfrey | 1,441 | 2.8 | +2.8 |
| Total formal votes | | 51,526 | 98.3 | |
| Informal votes | | 880 | 1.7 | |
| Turnout | | 52,406 | 96.2 | |
Two-party-preferred result
| Labor | Charles Jones | | 68.0 | +3.4 |
| Liberal | Malcolm Blackshaw | | 32.0 | −3.4 |
| Labor hold | | Swing | +3.4 | |

=== North Sydney ===
This section is an excerpt from Electoral results for the Division of North Sydney § 1972

1972 Australian federal election: North Sydney
| Party | Candidate | Votes | % | ±% |
|---|---|---|---|---|
| Liberal | Bill Graham | 26,043 | 50.6 | −6.9 |
| Labor | Brian Maguire | 18,666 | 36.2 | +0.6 |
| Australia | James Feros | 4,197 | 8.1 | +8.1 |
| Democratic Labor | Michael Fitzpatrick | 2,351 | 4.6 | −0.4 |
| Independent | Romualds Kemps | 247 | 0.5 | −1.4 |
| Total formal votes | | 51,504 | 98.2 | |
| Informal votes | | 919 | 1.8 | |
| Turnout | | 52,423 | 92.1 | |
Two-party-preferred result
| Liberal | Bill Graham | | 58.4 | −4.1 |
| Labor | Brian Maguire | | 41.6 | +4.1 |
| Liberal hold | | Swing | −4.1 | |

=== Parramatta ===
This section is an excerpt from Electoral results for the Division of Parramatta § 1972

1972 Australian federal election: Parramatta
| Party | Candidate | Votes | % | ±% |
|---|---|---|---|---|
| Liberal | Nigel Bowen | 28,463 | 46.0 | −1.0 |
| Labor | Michael Whelan | 28,458 | 46.0 | +1.4 |
| Australia | James Mulheron | 2,144 | 3.5 | +3.5 |
| Democratic Labor | Doris Brauer | 1,509 | 2.4 | −1.9 |
| Defence of Government Schools | Derek Barker | 1,120 | 1.8 | +1.8 |
| Independent | Graham Courtney | 191 | 0.3 | +0.3 |
| Total formal votes | | 61,885 | 97.8 | |
| Informal votes | | 1,397 | 2.2 | |
| Turnout | | 63,282 | 95.7 | |
Two-party-preferred result
| Liberal | Nigel Bowen | 31,122 | 50.3 | −2.4 |
| Labor | Michael Whelan | 30,763 | 49.7 | +2.4 |
| Liberal hold | | Swing | −2.4 | |

=== Paterson ===
This section is an excerpt from Electoral results for the Division of Paterson § 1972

1972 Australian federal election: Paterson
| Party | Candidate | Votes | % | ±% |
|---|---|---|---|---|
| Labor | Noel Unicomb | 23,430 | 48.0 | +10.5 |
| Country | Frank O'Keefe | 22,970 | 47.1 | +17.7 |
| Democratic Labor | Aubrey Barr | 1,376 | 2.8 | −1.2 |
| Australia | Alan Capp | 1,005 | 2.1 | +1.6 |
| Total formal votes | | 48,781 | 98.6 | |
| Informal votes | | 682 | 1.4 | |
| Turnout | | 49,463 | 96.9 | |
Two-party-preferred result
| Country | Frank O'Keefe | 24,609 | 50.4 | −7.1 |
| Labor | Noel Unicomb | 24,172 | 49.6 | +7.1 |
| Country hold | | Swing | −7.1 | |

=== Phillip ===
This section is an excerpt from Electoral results for the Division of Phillip § 1972

1972 Australian federal election: Phillip
| Party | Candidate | Votes | % | ±% |
|---|---|---|---|---|
| Labor | Joe Riordan | 28,065 | 50.0 | +6.1 |
| Liberal | Sir William Aston | 22,849 | 40.7 | −1.0 |
| Australia | Virginia Walker | 2,264 | 4.0 | +2.9 |
| Democratic Labor | Dennis Anderson | 1,934 | 3.4 | −1.0 |
| Defence of Government Schools | Colette Tucker | 528 | 0.9 | +0.9 |
| Independent | Thomas Conway | 344 | 0.6 | +0.6 |
| Independent | Neville Yeomans | 108 | 0.2 | +0.2 |
| Total formal votes | | 56,092 | 97.4 | |
| Informal votes | | 1,490 | 2.6 | |
| Turnout | | 57,582 | 92.1 | |
Two-party-preferred result
| Labor | Joe Riordan | | 53.7 | +4.1 |
| Liberal | Sir William Aston | | 46.3 | −4.1 |
| Labor gain from Liberal | | Swing | +4.1 | |

=== Prospect ===
This section is an excerpt from Electoral results for the Division of Prospect § 1972

1972 Australian federal election: Prospect
| Party | Candidate | Votes | % | ±% |
|---|---|---|---|---|
| Labor | Dick Klugman | 37,242 | 64.9 | +7.9 |
| Liberal | Stanislaus Kelly | 16,577 | 28.9 | −4.9 |
| Democratic Labor | William Dunbar | 3,523 | 6.1 | −3.1 |
| Total formal votes | | 57,342 | 97.0 | |
| Informal votes | | 1,766 | 3.0 | |
| Turnout | | 59,108 | 95.6 | |
Two-party-preferred result
| Labor | Dick Klugman | | 65.9 | +7.3 |
| Liberal | Stanislaus Kelly | | 34.1 | −7.3 |
| Labor hold | | Swing | +7.3 | |

=== Reid ===
This section is an excerpt from Electoral results for the Division of Reid § 1972

1972 Australian federal election: Reid
| Party | Candidate | Votes | % | ±% |
|---|---|---|---|---|
| Labor | Tom Uren | 35,032 | 66.5 | +7.2 |
| Liberal | William Pardy | 15,527 | 29.5 | −3.6 |
| Democratic Labor | Joseph Sanders | 2,106 | 4.0 | −1.3 |
| Total formal votes | | 52,665 | 97.6 | |
| Informal votes | | 1,309 | 2.4 | |
| Turnout | | 53,974 | 95.0 | |
Two-party-preferred result
| Labor | Tom Uren | | 67.3 | +5.9 |
| Liberal | William Pardy | | 32.7 | −5.9 |
| Labor hold | | Swing | +5.9 | |

=== Richmond ===
This section is an excerpt from Electoral results for the Division of Richmond § 1972

1972 Australian federal election: Richmond
| Party | Candidate | Votes | % | ±% |
|---|---|---|---|---|
| Country | Doug Anthony | 28,712 | 57.5 | −5.1 |
| Labor | Frederick Braid | 16,189 | 32.4 | −5.0 |
| Australia | Lawrence Alderman | 5,075 | 10.2 | +10.2 |
| Total formal votes | | 49,976 | 99.4 | |
| Informal votes | | 314 | 0.6 | |
| Turnout | | 50,290 | 95.0 | |
Two-party-preferred result
| Country | Doug Anthony | | 62.2 | −0.4 |
| Labor | Frederick Braid | | 37.8 | +0.4 |
| Country hold | | Swing | −0.4 | |

=== Riverina ===
This section is an excerpt from Electoral results for the Division of Riverina § 1972

1972 Australian federal election: Riverina
| Party | Candidate | Votes | % | ±% |
|---|---|---|---|---|
| Labor | Al Grassby | 24,705 | 54.7 | +3.2 |
| Country | Eric Kronborg | 16,003 | 35.4 | −8.9 |
| Liberal | Peter Long | 2,753 | 6.1 | +6.1 |
| Democratic Labor | Patrick Barry | 1,694 | 3.8 | −0.3 |
| Total formal votes | | 45,155 | 98.9 | |
| Informal votes | | 491 | 1.1 | |
| Turnout | | 45,646 | 94.9 | |
Two-party-preferred result
| Labor | Al Grassby | | 56.9 | +4.6 |
| Country | Eric Kronborg | | 44.1 | −4.6 |
| Labor hold | | Swing | +4.6 | |

=== Robertson ===
This section is an excerpt from Electoral results for the Division of Robertson § 1972

1972 Australian federal election: Robertson
| Party | Candidate | Votes | % | ±% |
|---|---|---|---|---|
| Labor | Barry Cohen | 36,916 | 58.1 | +7.9 |
| Liberal | Malcolm Brooks | 24,823 | 39.1 | −7.4 |
| Democratic Labor | Edmund Dearn | 1,804 | 2.8 | +2.8 |
| Total formal votes | | 63,543 | 98.9 | |
| Informal votes | | 697 | 1.1 | |
| Turnout | | 64,240 | 96.1 | |
Two-party-preferred result
| Labor | Barry Cohen | | 58.7 | +6.9 |
| Liberal | Malcolm Brooks | | 41.3 | −6.9 |
| Labor hold | | Swing | +6.9 | |

=== Shortland ===
This section is an excerpt from Electoral results for the Division of Shortland § 1972

1972 Australian federal election: Shortland
| Party | Candidate | Votes | % | ±% |
|---|---|---|---|---|
| Labor | Peter Morris | 29,604 | 55.9 | −4.1 |
| Liberal | Paul Clarkson | 14,287 | 27.0 | −3.5 |
| Independent | Leo Gately | 3,905 | 7.4 | +7.4 |
| Democratic Labor | Hugh Ansell | 2,549 | 4.8 | −0.3 |
| Australia | Charles Hockings | 1,669 | 3.2 | +3.2 |
| Communist | Geoff Curthoys | 594 | 1.1 | −0.9 |
| Independent | Lionel Lambkin | 356 | 0.7 | +0.7 |
| Total formal votes | | 52,964 | 98.2 | |
| Informal votes | | 976 | 1.8 | |
| Turnout | | 53,940 | 96.2 | |
Two-party-preferred result
| Labor | Peter Morris | | 63.7 | +0.2 |
| Liberal | Paul Clarkson | | 36.3 | −0.2 |
| Labor hold | | Swing | +0.2 | |

=== St George ===
This section is an excerpt from Electoral results for the Division of St George § 1972

1972 Australian federal election: St George
| Party | Candidate | Votes | % | ±% |
|---|---|---|---|---|
| Labor | Bill Morrison | 28,384 | 53.0 | +4.8 |
| Liberal | Len Bosman | 22,013 | 41.1 | −5.1 |
| Democratic Labor | Doris Allison | 1,754 | 3.3 | −0.1 |
| Australia | Christopher Owens | 1,165 | 2.2 | +0.8 |
| Independent | Charles Bellchambers | 206 | 0.4 | +0.4 |
| Total formal votes | | 53,522 | 97.8 | |
| Informal votes | | 1,200 | 2.2 | |
| Turnout | | 54,722 | 96.4 | |
Two-party-preferred result
| Labor | Bill Morrison | | 55.0 | +4.9 |
| Liberal | Len Bosman | | 45.0 | −4.9 |
| Labor hold | | Swing | +4.9 | |

=== Sydney ===
This section is an excerpt from Electoral results for the Division of Sydney § 1972

1972 Australian federal election: Sydney
| Party | Candidate | Votes | % | ±% |
|---|---|---|---|---|
| Labor | Jim Cope | 31,585 | 70.3 | +5.2 |
| Liberal | Graham Robertson | 6,609 | 14.7 | −5.4 |
| Australia | Allan Sorrensen | 3,431 | 7.6 | +7.6 |
| Communist | Laurie Aarons | 2,236 | 5.0 | +5.0 |
| Socialist | Pat Clancy | 1,062 | 2.4 | +2.4 |
| Total formal votes | | 44,923 | 96.0 | |
| Informal votes | | 1,883 | 4.0 | |
| Turnout | | 46,806 | 90.2 | |
Two-party-preferred result
| Labor | Jim Cope | | 80.7 | +7.1 |
| Liberal | Graham Robertson | | 19.3 | −7.1 |
| Labor hold | | Swing | +7.1 | |

=== Warringah ===
This section is an excerpt from Electoral results for the Division of Warringah § 1972

1972 Australian federal election: Warringah
| Party | Candidate | Votes | % | ±% |
|---|---|---|---|---|
| Liberal | Michael MacKellar | 28,896 | 54.6 | +4.4 |
| Labor | John Oakley | 16,631 | 31.4 | +8.2 |
| Australia | Bridget Gilling | 5,015 | 9.5 | +9.5 |
| Democratic Labor | Peter Keogh | 2,153 | 4.1 | −0.1 |
| Independent | Eric Riches | 256 | 0.5 | +0.5 |
| Total formal votes | | 52,951 | 98.4 | |
| Informal votes | | 836 | 1.6 | |
| Turnout | | 53,787 | 93.9 | |
Two-party-preferred result
| Liberal | Michael MacKellar | | 62.5 | −7.6 |
| Labor | John Oakley | | 37.5 | +7.6 |
| Liberal hold | | Swing | −7.6 | |

=== Wentworth ===
This section is an excerpt from Electoral results for the Division of Wentworth § 1972

1972 Australian federal election: Wentworth
| Party | Candidate | Votes | % | ±% |
|---|---|---|---|---|
| Liberal | Les Bury | 25,612 | 53.2 | −4.4 |
| Labor | Percy Allan | 17,663 | 36.7 | +2.5 |
| Australia | Helen Arbib | 3,550 | 7.4 | +7.4 |
| Democratic Labor | Dominique Droulers | 1,310 | 2.7 | −0.9 |
| Total formal votes | | 48,135 | 97.9 | |
| Informal votes | | 1,036 | 2.1 | |
| Turnout | | 49,171 | 92.5 | |
Two-party-preferred result
| Liberal | Les Bury | | 58.3 | −5.2 |
| Labor | Percy Allan | | 41.7 | +5.2 |
| Liberal hold | | Swing | −5.2 | |

=== Werriwa ===
This section is an excerpt from Electoral results for the Division of Werriwa § 1972

1972 Australian federal election: Werriwa
| Party | Candidate | Votes | % | ±% |
|---|---|---|---|---|
| Labor | Gough Whitlam | 41,297 | 68.9 | +7.7 |
| Liberal | Ron Dunbier | 16,822 | 28.1 | −1.0 |
| Democratic Labor | Andrew Murphy | 1,139 | 1.9 | −3.2 |
| Independent | Walter Turner | 380 | 0.6 | +0.6 |
| Independent | Maurice Sharp | 331 | 0.6 | +0.6 |
| Total formal votes | | 59,969 | 97.2 | |
| Informal votes | | 1,731 | 2.8 | |
| Turnout | | 61,700 | 95.5 | |
Two-party-preferred result
| Labor | Gough Whitlam | | 69.9 | +5.2 |
| Liberal | Ron Dunbier | | 30.1 | −5.2 |
| Labor hold | | Swing | +5.2 | |

== Victoria ==
1972 Australian federal election (Victoria)
| ← 1969 | 2 December 1972 | 1974 → |

All 34 Victorian seats in the House of Representatives 17 seats needed for a majority
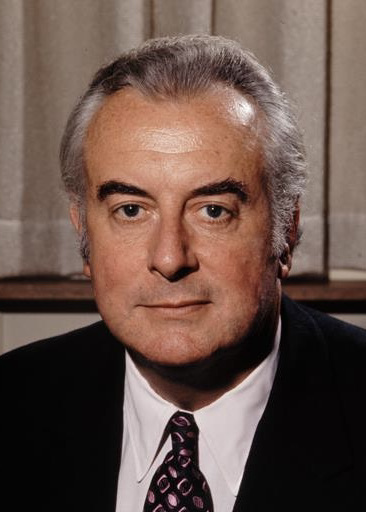

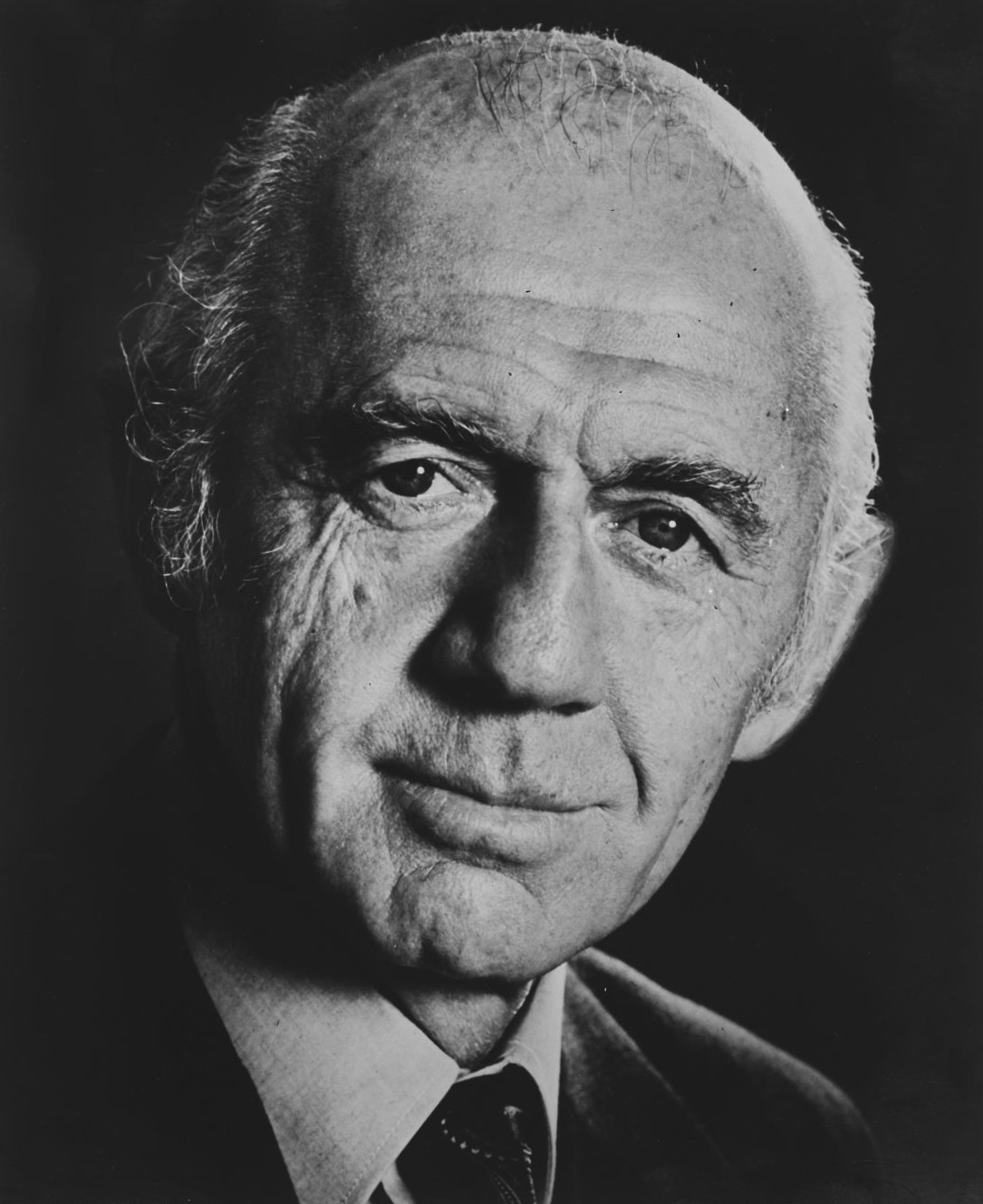
| | First party | Second party |
|---|---|---|
| Leader | Gough Whitlam | William McMahon |
| Party | Labor | Coalition |
| Seats before | 11 | 23 |
| Seats won | 14 | 20 |
| Seat change | ▲3 | ▼3 |
| Popular vote | 854,201 | 740,431 |
| Percentage | 47.3% | 41.0% |
| Swing | ▲6.0pp | ▼3.4pp |
| TPP | 50.4% | 49.4% |
| TPP swing | ▲5.5pp | ▼5.5pp |

=== Balaclava ===
This section is an excerpt from Electoral results for the Division of Balaclava § 1972

1972 Australian federal election: Balaclava
| Party | Candidate | Votes | % | ±% |
|---|---|---|---|---|
| Liberal | Ray Whittorn | 24,455 | 46.6 | −5.1 |
| Labor | Irene Dunsmuir | 23,365 | 44.5 | +8.0 |
| Democratic Labor | Ralph James | 3,809 | 7.3 | −1.8 |
| Independent | Leslie Rubinstein | 857 | 1.6 | +1.6 |
| Total formal votes | | 52,486 | 97.7 | |
| Informal votes | | 1,234 | 2.3 | |
| Turnout | | 53,720 | 95.0 | |
Two-party-preferred result
| Liberal | Ray Whittorn | 28,218 | 53.8 | −7.1 |
| Labor | Irene Dunsmuir | 24,268 | 46.2 | +7.1 |
| Liberal hold | | Swing | −7.1 | |

=== Ballarat ===
This section is an excerpt from Electoral results for the Division of Ballarat § 1972

1972 Australian federal election: Ballaarat
| Party | Candidate | Votes | % | ±% |
|---|---|---|---|---|
| Labor | David Williams | 22,800 | 45.6 | +6.3 |
| Liberal | Dudley Erwin | 20,860 | 41.8 | −2.2 |
| Democratic Labor | Anthony Balkin | 6,297 | 12.6 | −1.0 |
| Total formal votes | | 49,957 | 98.9 | |
| Informal votes | | 577 | 1.1 | |
| Turnout | | 50,534 | 96.7 | |
Two-party-preferred result
| Liberal | Dudley Erwin | 26,719 | 53.5 | −5.5 |
| Labor | David Williams | 23,238 | 46.5 | +5.5 |
| Liberal hold | | Swing | −5.5 | |

=== Batman ===
This section is an excerpt from Electoral results for the Division of Batman § 1972

1972 Australian federal election: Batman
| Party | Candidate | Votes | % | ±% |
|---|---|---|---|---|
| Labor | Horrie Garrick | 29,578 | 55.9 | +9.4 |
| Liberal | Leon Bram | 18,200 | 34.4 | +1.3 |
| Democratic Labor | Henry Darroch | 5,163 | 9.8 | −4.9 |
| Total formal votes | | 52,941 | 97.3 | |
| Informal votes | | 1,480 | 2.7 | |
| Turnout | | 54,421 | 94.4 | |
Two-party-preferred result
| Labor | Horrie Garrick | | 56.9 | +3.9 |
| Liberal | Leon Bram | | 45.1 | −3.9 |
| Labor hold | | Swing | +3.9 | |

=== Bendigo ===
This section is an excerpt from Electoral results for the Division of Bendigo § 1972

1972 Australian federal election: Bendigo
| Party | Candidate | Votes | % | ±% |
|---|---|---|---|---|
| Labor | David Kennedy | 24,326 | 47.7 | −3.1 |
| Liberal | John Bourchier | 13,637 | 26.7 | −10.0 |
| Country | Joe Pearce | 8,813 | 17.3 | +17.3 |
| Democratic Labor | Paul Brennan | 4,267 | 8.4 | −4.1 |
| Total formal votes | | 51,043 | 98.8 | |
| Informal votes | | 636 | 1.2 | |
| Turnout | | 51,679 | 96.9 | |
Two-party-preferred result
| Liberal | John Bourchier | 25,604 | 50.2 | +3.2 |
| Labor | David Kennedy | 25,439 | 49.8 | −3.2 |
| Liberal gain from Labor | | Swing | +3.2 | |

=== Bruce ===
This section is an excerpt from Electoral results for the Division of Bruce § 1972

1972 Australian federal election: Bruce
| Party | Candidate | Votes | % | ±% |
|---|---|---|---|---|
| Liberal | Billy Snedden | 27,893 | 44.3 | −5.3 |
| Labor | Russell Oakley | 26,312 | 41.8 | +5.8 |
| Democratic Labor | Rex Harper | 4,632 | 7.4 | −3.0 |
| Australia | Peter Moore | 4,170 | 6.5 | +4.6 |
| Total formal votes | | 62,944 | 98.5 | |
| Informal votes | | 987 | 1.5 | |
| Turnout | | 63,931 | 97.1 | |
Two-party-preferred result
| Liberal | Billy Snedden | 32,881 | 52.2 | −7.7 |
| Labor | Russell Oakley | 30,063 | 47.8 | +7.7 |
| Liberal hold | | Swing | −7.7 | |

=== Burke ===
This section is an excerpt from Electoral results for the Division of Burke (1969–2004) § 1972

1972 Australian federal election: Burke
| Party | Candidate | Votes | % | ±% |
|---|---|---|---|---|
| Labor | Keith Johnson | 39,510 | 63.6 | +6.8 |
| Liberal | Howard Thain | 16,143 | 26.0 | −4.2 |
| Democratic Labor | Colin Walsh | 6,502 | 10.5 | −0.1 |
| Total formal votes | | 62,155 | 96.8 | |
| Informal votes | | 2,034 | 3.2 | |
| Turnout | | 64,189 | 96.5 | |
Two-party-preferred result
| Labor | Keith Johnson | | 64.7 | +5.5 |
| Liberal | Howard Thain | | 35.3 | −5.5 |
| Labor hold | | Swing | +5.5 | |

=== Casey ===
This section is an excerpt from Electoral results for the Division of Casey § 1972

1972 Australian federal election: Casey
| Party | Candidate | Votes | % | ±% |
|---|---|---|---|---|
| Labor | Race Mathews | 27,845 | 46.9 | +5.9 |
| Liberal | Peter Howson | 23,079 | 38.9 | −4.3 |
| Democratic Labor | Kevin Adamson | 4,242 | 7.1 | −4.3 |
| Australia | Clive Champion | 2,277 | 3.8 | +0.1 |
| Independent | Margaret Briggs | 749 | 1.3 | +1.3 |
| Defence of Government Schools | Alfred Andrews | 727 | 1.2 | +1.2 |
| Independent | Roderick Matthews | 416 | 0.7 | +0.7 |
| Total formal votes | | 59,335 | 97.5 | |
| Informal votes | | 1,523 | 2.5 | |
| Turnout | | 60,858 | 96.4 | |
Two-party-preferred result
| Labor | Race Mathews | | 52.2 | +7.2 |
| Liberal | Peter Howson | | 47.8 | −7.2 |
| Labor gain from Liberal | | Swing | +7.2 | |

=== Chisholm ===
This section is an excerpt from Electoral results for the Division of Chisholm § 1972

1972 Australian federal election: Chisholm
| Party | Candidate | Votes | % | ±% |
|---|---|---|---|---|
| Liberal | Tony Staley | 24,622 | 46.8 | −6.1 |
| Labor | Alastair Nicholson | 20,608 | 39.2 | +5.1 |
| Democratic Labor | William Hoyne | 4,006 | 7.6 | −1.4 |
| Australia | Robert Cowley | 3,354 | 6.4 | +2.5 |
| Total formal votes | | 52,590 | 98.5 | |
| Informal votes | | 811 | 1.5 | |
| Turnout | | 53,401 | 95.5 | |
Two-party-preferred result
| Liberal | Tony Staley | 29,110 | 55.4 | −7.2 |
| Labor | Alastair Nicholson | 23,480 | 44.6 | +7.2 |
| Liberal hold | | Swing | −7.2 | |

=== Corangamite ===
This section is an excerpt from Electoral results for the Division of Corangamite § 1972

1972 Australian federal election: Corangamite
| Party | Candidate | Votes | % | ±% |
|---|---|---|---|---|
| Liberal | Tony Street | 26,769 | 53.4 | −2.2 |
| Labor | Edwin Morris | 18,729 | 37.4 | +4.2 |
| Democratic Labor | Francis O'Brien | 4,594 | 9.2 | −2.0 |
| Total formal votes | | 50,092 | 99.0 | |
| Informal votes | | 530 | 1.0 | |
| Turnout | | 50,622 | 97.6 | |
Two-party-preferred result
| Liberal | Tony Street | | 61.7 | −2.9 |
| Labor | Edwin Morris | | 38.3 | +2.9 |
| Liberal hold | | Swing | −2.9 | |

=== Corio ===
This section is an excerpt from Electoral results for the Division of Corio § 1972

1972 Australian federal election: Corio
| Party | Candidate | Votes | % | ±% |
|---|---|---|---|---|
| Labor | Gordon Scholes | 29,942 | 56.6 | +6.1 |
| Liberal | John Pawson | 18,174 | 34.4 | +0.0 |
| Democratic Labor | John Timberlake | 4,776 | 9.0 | −0.5 |
| Total formal votes | | 52,892 | 98.0 | |
| Informal votes | | 1,081 | 2.0 | |
| Turnout | | 53,973 | 95.5 | |
Two-party-preferred result
| Labor | Gordon Scholes | | 57.5 | +3.7 |
| Liberal | John Pawson | | 42.5 | −3.7 |
| Labor hold | | Swing | +3.7 | |

=== Deakin ===
This section is an excerpt from Electoral results for the Division of Deakin § 1972

1972 Australian federal election: Deakin
| Party | Candidate | Votes | % | ±% |
|---|---|---|---|---|
| Labor | William French | 23,987 | 43.9 | +7.9 |
| Liberal | Alan Jarman | 22,873 | 41.9 | −5.1 |
| Democratic Labor | Maurice Weston | 3,732 | 6.8 | −2.9 |
| Australia | Gavan Burn | 2,336 | 4.3 | +4.3 |
| Independent | Harold Jeffrey | 1,658 | 3.0 | +3.0 |
| Total formal votes | | 54,586 | 98.3 | |
| Informal votes | | 934 | 1.7 | |
| Turnout | | 55,520 | 96.4 | |
Two-party-preferred result
| Liberal | Alan Jarman | 27,653 | 50.7 | −7.0 |
| Labor | William French | 26,933 | 49.3 | +7.0 |
| Liberal hold | | Swing | −7.0 | |

=== Diamond Valley ===
This section is an excerpt from Electoral results for the Division of Diamond Valley § 1972

1972 Australian federal election: Diamond Valley
| Party | Candidate | Votes | % | ±% |
|---|---|---|---|---|
| Labor | David McKenzie | 30,927 | 45.2 | +3.9 |
| Liberal | Neil Brown | 26,651 | 39.0 | −6.7 |
| Democratic Labor | Jim Marmion | 4,876 | 7.1 | −3.4 |
| Australia | John Siddons | 4,314 | 6.3 | +3.8 |
| Defence of Government Schools | Douglas Alexander | 1,489 | 2.2 | +2.2 |
| Independent | Shaun Redmond | 145 | 0.2 | +0.2 |
| Total formal votes | | 68,402 | 97.5 | |
| Informal votes | | 1,761 | 2.5 | |
| Turnout | | 70,163 | 96.7 | |
Two-party-preferred result
| Labor | David McKenzie | | 51.6 | +7.7 |
| Liberal | Neil Brown | | 48.4 | −7.7 |
| Labor gain from Liberal | | Swing | +7.7 | |

=== Flinders ===
This section is an excerpt from Electoral results for the Division of Flinders § 1972

1972 Australian federal election: Flinders
| Party | Candidate | Votes | % | ±% |
|---|---|---|---|---|
| Liberal | Phillip Lynch | 29,640 | 48.5 | −6.6 |
| Labor | Colin Bednall | 27,273 | 44.6 | +10.5 |
| Democratic Labor | John Glynn | 2,380 | 3.9 | −3.2 |
| Australia | David Heath | 1,801 | 2.9 | +2.9 |
| Total formal votes | | 61,094 | 98.5 | |
| Informal votes | | 954 | 1.5 | |
| Turnout | | 62,048 | 96.0 | |
Two-party-preferred result
| Liberal | Phillip Lynch | 32,314 | 52.9 | −10.6 |
| Labor | Colin Bednall | 28,780 | 47.1 | +10.6 |
| Liberal hold | | Swing | −10.6 | |

=== Gellibrand ===
This section is an excerpt from Electoral results for the Division of Gellibrand § 1972

1972 Australian federal election: Gellibrand
| Party | Candidate | Votes | % | ±% |
|---|---|---|---|---|
| Labor | Ralph Willis | 32,029 | 64.4 | +2.1 |
| Liberal | David Munro | 12,722 | 25.6 | +1.4 |
| Democratic Labor | Robin Thomas | 4,951 | 10.0 | −3.5 |
| Total formal votes | | 49,702 | 96.0 | |
| Informal votes | | 2,056 | 4.0 | |
| Turnout | | 51,758 | 95.1 | |
Two-party-preferred result
| Labor | Ralph Willis | | 65.4 | +1.7 |
| Liberal | David Munro | | 34.6 | −1.7 |
| Labor hold | | Swing | +1.7 | |

=== Gippsland ===
This section is an excerpt from Electoral results for the Division of Gippsland § 1972

1972 Australian federal election: Gippsland
| Party | Candidate | Votes | % | ±% |
|---|---|---|---|---|
| Country | Peter Nixon | 26,007 | 53.1 | −5.7 |
| Labor | Peter Turner | 16,591 | 33.9 | +4.6 |
| Democratic Labor | John Condon | 3,869 | 7.9 | −4.0 |
| Australia | John Bowron | 2,541 | 5.2 | +5.2 |
| Total formal votes | | 49,008 | 98.4 | |
| Informal votes | | 775 | 1.6 | |
| Turnout | | 49,783 | 96.4 | |
Two-party-preferred result
| Country | Peter Nixon | | 62.9 | −6.7 |
| Labor | Peter Turner | | 37.1 | +6.7 |
| Country hold | | Swing | −6.7 | |

=== Henty ===
This section is an excerpt from Electoral results for the Division of Henty § 1972

1972 Australian federal election: Henty
| Party | Candidate | Votes | % | ±% |
|---|---|---|---|---|
| Labor | Joan Child | 24,701 | 46.4 | +10.7 |
| Liberal | Max Fox | 22,577 | 42.4 | −4.2 |
| Democratic Labor | Terry Farrell | 3,926 | 7.4 | −2.3 |
| Australia | Michael Hughes | 2,080 | 3.9 | +3.9 |
| Total formal votes | | 53,284 | 97.9 | |
| Informal votes | | 1,128 | 2.1 | |
| Turnout | | 54,412 | 95.4 | |
Two-party-preferred result
| Liberal | Max Fox | 26,796 | 50.3 | −9.1 |
| Labor | Joan Child | 26,488 | 49.7 | +9.1 |
| Liberal hold | | Swing | −9.1 | |

=== Higgins ===
This section is an excerpt from Electoral results for the Division of Higgins § 1972

1972 Australian federal election: Higgins
| Party | Candidate | Votes | % | ±% |
|---|---|---|---|---|
| Liberal | John Gorton | 29,335 | 53.4 | −5.1 |
| Labor | David Hardy | 19,362 | 35.3 | +6.5 |
| Democratic Labor | Peter Grant | 3,142 | 5.7 | −2.4 |
| Australia | Jack Hammond | 3,069 | 5.6 | +2.5 |
| Total formal votes | | 54,908 | 98.1 | |
| Informal votes | | 1,055 | 1.9 | |
| Turnout | | 55,963 | 94.3 | |
Two-party-preferred result
| Liberal | John Gorton | | 60.8 | −7.0 |
| Labor | David Hardy | | 39.2 | +7.0 |
| Liberal hold | | Swing | −7.0 | |

=== Holt ===
This section is an excerpt from Electoral results for the Division of Holt § 1972

1972 Australian federal election: Holt
| Party | Candidate | Votes | % | ±% |
|---|---|---|---|---|
| Labor | Max Oldmeadow | 32,318 | 51.5 | +6.3 |
| Liberal | Len Reid | 24,203 | 38.6 | −3.8 |
| Democratic Labor | Henri de Sachau | 3,810 | 6.1 | −6.3 |
| Australia | Brenda Elliott | 1,222 | 1.9 | +1.9 |
| Defence of Government Schools | Ian Black | 1,207 | 1.9 | +1.9 |
| Total formal votes | | 62,760 | 97.1 | |
| Informal votes | | 1,850 | 2.9 | |
| Turnout | | 64,610 | 96.6 | |
Two-party-preferred result
| Labor | Max Oldmeadow | | 54.4 | +7.9 |
| Liberal | Len Reid | | 45.6 | −7.9 |
| Labor gain from Liberal | | Swing | +7.9 | |

=== Hotham ===
This section is an excerpt from Electoral results for the Division of Hotham § 1972

1972 Australian federal election: Hotham
| Party | Candidate | Votes | % | ±% |
|---|---|---|---|---|
| Liberal | Don Chipp | 25,242 | 48.1 | −0.1 |
| Labor | Barry Johnston | 21,796 | 41.5 | +1.5 |
| Democratic Labor | Henry Beven | 4,211 | 8.0 | −1.3 |
| Independent | Ian Kenner | 846 | 1.6 | +1.6 |
| Independent | John Murray | 418 | 0.8 | +0.8 |
| Total formal votes | | 52,513 | 97.3 | |
| Informal votes | | 1,453 | 2.7 | |
| Turnout | | 53,966 | 96.1 | |
Two-party-preferred result
| Liberal | Don Chipp | 30,003 | 57.1 | −1.1 |
| Labor | Barry Johnston | 22,510 | 42.9 | +1.1 |
| Liberal hold | | Swing | −1.1 | |

=== Indi ===
This section is an excerpt from Electoral results for the Division of Indi § 1972

1972 Australian federal election: Indi
| Party | Candidate | Votes | % | ±% |
|---|---|---|---|---|
| Country | Mac Holten | 23,872 | 51.6 | +4.6 |
| Labor | John Hodgson | 16,699 | 36.1 | +7.6 |
| Democratic Labor | Christopher Cody | 4,556 | 9.8 | −2.5 |
| Independent | Ronald Gray | 598 | 1.3 | +1.3 |
| Independent | Geoffrey Ryan | 576 | 1.2 | +1.2 |
| Total formal votes | | 46,301 | 97.9 | |
| Informal votes | | 1,005 | 2.1 | |
| Turnout | | 47,306 | 96.7 | |
Two-party-preferred result
| Country | Mac Holten | | 60.8 | −7.9 |
| Labor | John Hodgson | | 39.2 | +7.9 |
| Country hold | | Swing | −7.9 | |

=== Isaacs ===
This section is an excerpt from Electoral results for the Division of Isaacs § 1972

1972 Australian federal election: Isaacs
| Party | Candidate | Votes | % | ±% |
|---|---|---|---|---|
| Labor | Gareth Clayton | 23,904 | 45.8 | +5.7 |
| Liberal | David Hamer | 22,110 | 42.4 | −5.3 |
| Democratic Labor | Frederick Skinner | 3,635 | 7.0 | −3.1 |
| Australia | Peter Harrie | 2,499 | 4.8 | +4.8 |
| Total formal votes | | 52,148 | 98.7 | |
| Informal votes | | 685 | 1.3 | |
| Turnout | | 52,833 | 95.6 | |
Two-party-preferred result
| Liberal | David Hamer | 26,664 | 51.1 | −6.9 |
| Labor | Gareth Clayton | 25,484 | 48.9 | +6.9 |
| Liberal hold | | Swing | −6.9 | |

=== Kooyong ===
This section is an excerpt from Electoral results for the Division of Kooyong § 1972

1972 Australian federal election: Kooyong
| Party | Candidate | Votes | % | ±% |
|---|---|---|---|---|
| Liberal | Andrew Peacock | 27,104 | 49.6 | −4.7 |
| Labor | Clive Lipshut | 19,039 | 34.8 | +1.9 |
| Democratic Labor | Francis Duffy | 4,465 | 8.2 | −4.6 |
| Australia | Pamela Thornley | 3,237 | 5.9 | +5.9 |
| Independent | Ian Channell | 807 | 1.5 | +1.5 |
| Total formal votes | | 54,652 | 97.8 | |
| Informal votes | | 1,219 | 2.2 | |
| Turnout | | 55,871 | 95.0 | |
Two-party-preferred result
| Liberal | Andrew Peacock | | 59.0 | −5.9 |
| Labor | Clive Lipshut | | 41.0 | +5.9 |
| Liberal hold | | Swing | −5.9 | |

=== La Trobe ===
This section is an excerpt from Electoral results for the Division of La Trobe § 1972

1972 Australian federal election: La Trobe
| Party | Candidate | Votes | % | ±% |
|---|---|---|---|---|
| Labor | Tony Lamb | 31,885 | 50.5 | +8.8 |
| Liberal | John Jess | 23,961 | 37.9 | −6.7 |
| Democratic Labor | George Noone | 3,292 | 5.2 | −3.6 |
| Australia | Don Walters | 2,083 | 3.3 | −1.7 |
| Defence of Government Schools | Eileen Fowler | 1,238 | 2.0 | +2.0 |
| Independent | Jeffrey Gill | 700 | 1.1 | +1.1 |
| Total formal votes | | 63,159 | 97.7 | |
| Informal votes | | 1,505 | 2.3 | |
| Turnout | | 64,664 | 96.0 | |
Two-party-preferred result
| Labor | Tony Lamb | | 55.0 | +10.2 |
| Liberal | John Jess | | 45.0 | −10.2 |
| Labor gain from Liberal | | Swing | −3.5 | |

=== Lalor ===
This section is an excerpt from Electoral results for the Division of Lalor § 1972

1972 Australian federal election: Lalor
| Party | Candidate | Votes | % | ±% |
|---|---|---|---|---|
| Labor | Jim Cairns | 35,677 | 62.5 | +5.6 |
| Liberal | Joseph Sheen | 14,189 | 24.9 | +0.2 |
| Democratic Labor | John Bacon | 6,698 | 11.7 | −3.6 |
| National Socialist | Cass Young | 489 | 0.9 | +0.9 |
| Total formal votes | | 57,053 | 95.6 | |
| Informal votes | | 2,432 | 4.1 | |
| Turnout | | 59,485 | 95.0 | |
Two-party-preferred result
| Labor | Jim Cairns | | 65.0 | +4.1 |
| Liberal | Joseph Sheen | | 35.0 | −4.1 |
| Labor hold | | Swing | +4.1 | |

=== Mallee ===
This section is an excerpt from Electoral results for the Division of Mallee § 1972

1972 Australian federal election: Mallee
| Party | Candidate | Votes | % | ±% |
|---|---|---|---|---|
| Country | Peter Fisher | 24,140 | 55.3 | +8.6 |
| Labor | Ronald Davies | 14,593 | 33.4 | +1.9 |
| Democratic Labor | Stanley Croughan | 4,930 | 11.3 | +2.4 |
| Total formal votes | | 43,663 | 98.6 | |
| Informal votes | | 614 | 1.4 | |
| Turnout | | 44,277 | 97.1 | |
Two-party-preferred result
| Country | Peter Fisher | | 64.6 | −1.5 |
| Labor | Ronald Davies | | 35.4 | +1.5 |
| Country hold | | Swing | −1.5 | |

=== Maribyrnong ===
This section is an excerpt from Electoral results for the Division of Maribyrnong § 1972

1972 Australian federal election: Maribyrnong
| Party | Candidate | Votes | % | ±% |
|---|---|---|---|---|
| Labor | Moss Cass | 26,410 | 49.9 | +3.7 |
| Liberal | Rex Webb | 17,529 | 33.1 | −2.4 |
| Democratic Labor | Paul McManus | 6,301 | 11.9 | −0.5 |
| Australia | Gary Scholes | 1,432 | 2.7 | +2.7 |
| Defence of Government Schools | Lance Hutchinson | 1,114 | 2.1 | −3.1 |
| National Socialist | Katrina Young | 148 | 0.3 | +0.3 |
| Total formal votes | | 52,934 | 96.1 | |
| Informal votes | | 2,154 | 3.9 | |
| Turnout | | 55,088 | 96.3 | |
Two-party-preferred result
| Labor | Moss Cass | | 54.2 | +3.0 |
| Liberal | Rex Webb | | 45.8 | −3.0 |
| Labor hold | | Swing | +3.0 | |

=== McMillan ===
This section is an excerpt from Electoral results for the Division of McMillan § 1972

1972 Australian federal election: McMillan
| Party | Candidate | Votes | % | ±% |
|---|---|---|---|---|
| Labor | Frank Mountford | 22,802 | 45.8 | +3.7 |
| Liberal | Barrie Armitage | 12,025 | 24.1 | −8.0 |
| Country | Arthur Hewson | 8,282 | 16.6 | −0.3 |
| Democratic Labor | Michael Houlihan | 3,583 | 7.2 | −1.8 |
| Independent | Alex Buchanan | 3,113 | 6.3 | +6.3 |
| Total formal votes | | 49,805 | 98.1 | |
| Informal votes | | 962 | 1.9 | |
| Turnout | | 50,767 | 96.5 | |
Two-party-preferred result
| Country | Arthur Hewson | 26,096 | 52.4 | +52.4 |
| Labor | Frank Mountford | 23,709 | 47.6 | +2.9 |
| Country gain from Liberal | | Swing | −2.9 | |

=== Melbourne ===
This section is an excerpt from Electoral results for the Division of Melbourne § 1972

1972 Australian federal election: Melbourne
| Party | Candidate | Votes | % | ±% |
|---|---|---|---|---|
| Labor | Ted Innes | 27,592 | 59.7 | +6.6 |
| Liberal | Patricia Clark | 10,937 | 23.7 | −7.0 |
| Democratic Labor | Anna Linard | 4,174 | 9.0 | −2.2 |
| Australia | Wendy Nicholson | 2,391 | 5.2 | +5.2 |
| Communist | Max Ogden | 626 | 1.4 | +1.4 |
| Independent | Shane Watson | 277 | 0.6 | +0.6 |
| Independent | George Samargis | 197 | 0.4 | +0.4 |
| Total formal votes | | 46,194 | 93.0 | |
| Informal votes | | 3,479 | 7.0 | |
| Turnout | | 49,673 | 92.1 | |
Two-party-preferred result
| Labor | Ted Innes | | 65.5 | +8.8 |
| Liberal | Patricia Clark | | 34.5 | −8.8 |
| Labor hold | | Swing | +8.8 | |

=== Melbourne Ports ===
This section is an excerpt from Electoral results for the Division of Melbourne Ports § 1972

1972 Australian federal election: Melbourne Ports
| Party | Candidate | Votes | % | ±% |
|---|---|---|---|---|
| Labor | Frank Crean | 29,631 | 61.5 | +9.5 |
| Liberal | Paul Fenton | 14,722 | 30.5 | −2.4 |
| Democratic Labor | John Johnston | 3,845 | 8.0 | −0.1 |
| Total formal votes | | 48,198 | 97.0 | |
| Informal votes | | 1,476 | 3.0 | |
| Turnout | | 49,674 | 91.3 | |
Two-party-preferred result
| Labor | Frank Crean | | 62.3 | +6.0 |
| Liberal | Paul Fenton | | 37.7 | −6.0 |
| Labor hold | | Swing | +6.0 | |

=== Murray ===
This section is an excerpt from Electoral results for the Division of Murray § 1972

1972 Australian federal election: Murray
| Party | Candidate | Votes | % | ±% |
|---|---|---|---|---|
| Country | Bruce Lloyd | 22,532 | 46.1 | −7.2 |
| Labor | John Riordan | 14,958 | 30.6 | +7.4 |
| Liberal | Bill Hunter | 7,774 | 15.9 | +15.9 |
| Democratic Labor | Patrick Payne | 3,570 | 7.3 | −2.3 |
| Total formal votes | | 48,834 | 98.2 | |
| Informal votes | | 899 | 1.8 | |
| Turnout | | 49,733 | 97.3 | |
Two-party-preferred result
| Country | Bruce Lloyd | | 67.4 | −7.1 |
| Labor | John Riordan | | 32.6 | +7.1 |
| Country hold | | Swing | −7.1 | |

=== Scullin ===
This section is an excerpt from Electoral results for the Division of Scullin § 1972

1972 Australian federal election: Scullin
| Party | Candidate | Votes | % | ±% |
|---|---|---|---|---|
| Labor | Harry Jenkins | 30,815 | 61.7 | +9.5 |
| Liberal | Graeme McEwen | 13,072 | 26.2 | −0.9 |
| Democratic Labor | Tom Andrews | 6,027 | 12.1 | −2.5 |
| Total formal votes | | 49,914 | 96.9 | |
| Informal votes | | 1,604 | 3.1 | |
| Turnout | | 51,518 | 96.0 | |
Two-party-preferred result
| Labor | Harry Jenkins | | 63.8 | +6.2 |
| Liberal | Graeme McEwen | | 36.2 | −6.2 |
| Labor hold | | Swing | +6.2 | |

=== Wannon ===
This section is an excerpt from Electoral results for the Division of Wannon § 1972

1972 Australian federal election: Wannon
| Party | Candidate | Votes | % | ±% |
|---|---|---|---|---|
| Liberal | Malcolm Fraser | 21,760 | 46.1 | −5.2 |
| Labor | Ted Garth | 19,375 | 41.0 | +3.9 |
| Democratic Labor | Adrian McInerney | 3,800 | 8.0 | −3.6 |
| Independent | Linden Cameron | 2,284 | 4.8 | +4.8 |
| Total formal votes | | 47,219 | 99.3 | |
| Informal votes | | 319 | 0.7 | |
| Turnout | | 47,538 | 97.9 | |
Two-party-preferred result
| Liberal | Malcolm Fraser | 26,445 | 56.0 | −5.7 |
| Labor | Ted Garth | 20,774 | 44.0 | +5.7 |
| Liberal hold | | Swing | −5.7 | |

=== Wills ===
This section is an excerpt from Electoral results for the Division of Wills § 1972

1972 Australian federal election: Wills
| Party | Candidate | Votes | % | ±% |
|---|---|---|---|---|
| Labor | Gordon Bryant | 30,410 | 60.7 | +9.8 |
| Liberal | John Gray | 14,015 | 28.0 | −1.6 |
| Democratic Labor | John Flint | 5,650 | 11.3 | −0.6 |
| Total formal votes | | 50,075 | 96.5 | |
| Informal votes | | 51,897 | 95.8 | |
| Turnout | | 50,075 | 96.5 | |
Two-party-preferred result
| Labor | Gordon Bryant | | 61.8 | +5.4 |
| Liberal | John Gray | | 38.2 | −5.4 |
| Labor hold | | Swing | +5.4 | |

=== Wimmera ===
This section is an excerpt from Electoral results for the Division of Wimmera § 1972

1972 Australian federal election: Wimmera
| Party | Candidate | Votes | % | ±% |
|---|---|---|---|---|
| Country | Robert King | 20,512 | 47.0 | +16.0 |
| Labor | Brian Brooke | 18,412 | 42.1 | +4.6 |
| Democratic Labor | Robert Hawks | 3,113 | 7.1 | +0.6 |
| Independent | Ray Buckley | 1,652 | 3.8 | +3.8 |
| Total formal votes | | 43,689 | 99.0 | |
| Informal votes | | 422 | 1.0 | |
| Turnout | | 44,111 | 97.2 | |
Two-party-preferred result
| Country | Robert King | 24,279 | 55.6 | −2.4 |
| Labor | Brian Brooke | 19,410 | 44.4 | +2.4 |
| Country hold | | Swing | −2.4 | |

== Queensland ==
1972 Australian federal election (Queensland)
| ← 1969 | 2 December 1972 | 1974 → |

All 18 Queensland seats in the House of Representatives 9 seats needed for a majority
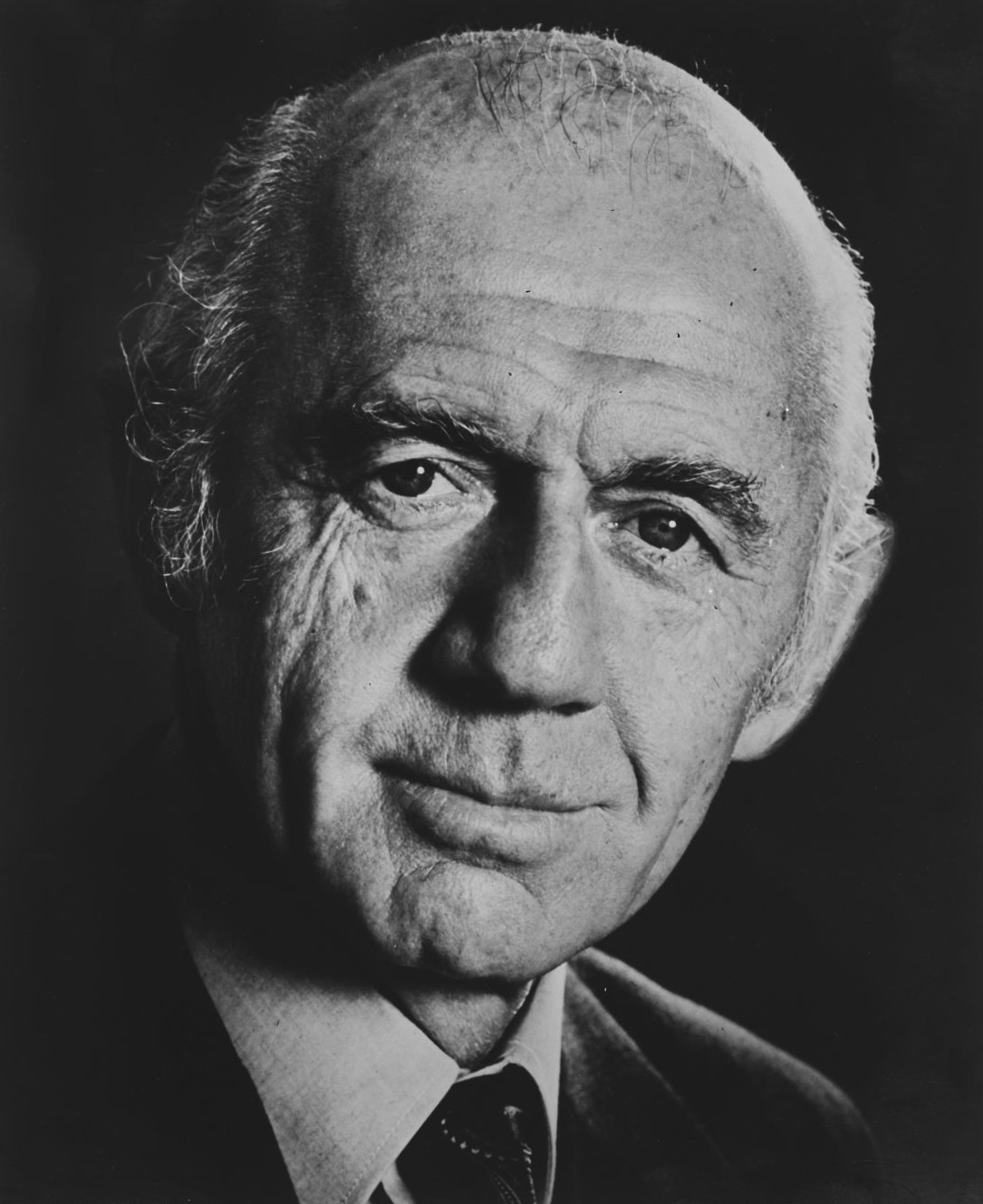

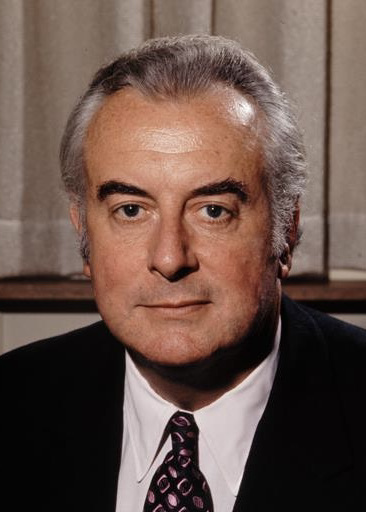
| | First party | Second party |
|---|---|---|
| Leader | William McMahon | Gough Whitlam |
| Party | Coalition | Labor |
| Seats before | 11 | 7 |
| Seats won | 10 | 8 |
| Seat change | ▼1 | ▲1 |
| Popular vote | 429,809 | 449,620 |
| Percentage | 45.1% | 47.2% |
| Swing | ▲0.6pp | ▼1.0pp |
| TPP | 50.5% | 49.5% |
| TPP swing | ▼0.4pp | ▲0.4pp |

=== Bowman ===
This section is an excerpt from Electoral results for the Division of Bowman § 1972

1972 Australian federal election: Bowman
| Party | Candidate | Votes | % | ±% |
|---|---|---|---|---|
| Labor | Len Keogh | 35,113 | 55.2 | +4.1 |
| Liberal | Kerry Chiconi | 24,964 | 39.3 | −2.8 |
| Democratic Labor | Denis Cochran | 3,508 | 5.5 | +0.6 |
| Total formal votes | | 63,585 | 98.4 | |
| Informal votes | | 1,040 | 1.6 | |
| Turnout | | 64,625 | 95.1 | |
Two-party-preferred result
| Labor | Len Keogh | | 56.3 | +3.8 |
| Liberal | Kerry Chiconi | | 43.7 | −3.8 |
| Labor hold | | Swing | +3.8 | |

=== Brisbane ===
This section is an excerpt from Electoral results for the Division of Brisbane § 1972

1972 Australian federal election: Brisbane
| Party | Candidate | Votes | % | ±% |
|---|---|---|---|---|
| Labor | Manfred Cross | 25,467 | 49.4 | −2.8 |
| Liberal | Jim Anderson | 15,213 | 29.5 | −10.0 |
| Country | Glen Sheil | 6,208 | 12.0 | +12.0 |
| Democratic Labor | Andrew Aitken | 4,333 | 8.4 | +0.1 |
| Communist | Charlie Gifford | 372 | 0.7 | +0.7 |
| Total formal votes | | 51,593 | 96.2 | |
| Informal votes | | 2,024 | 3.8 | |
| Turnout | | 53,617 | 93.6 | |
Two-party-preferred result
| Labor | Manfred Cross | | 51.8 | −2.1 |
| Liberal | Jim Anderson | | 48.2 | +2.1 |
| Labor hold | | Swing | −2.1 | |

=== Capricornia ===
This section is an excerpt from Electoral results for the Division of Capricornia § 1972

1972 Australian federal election: Capricornia
| Party | Candidate | Votes | % | ±% |
|---|---|---|---|---|
| Labor | Doug Everingham | 26,632 | 55.8 | −6.6 |
| Country | Kevin Connor | 11,176 | 23.4 | +23.4 |
| Liberal | Brian Palmer | 7,163 | 15.0 | −16.1 |
| Democratic Labor | Brian Besley | 2,743 | 5.7 | −0.8 |
| Total formal votes | | 47,714 | 98.6 | |
| Informal votes | | 685 | 1.4 | |
| Turnout | | 48,399 | 96.0 | |
Two-party-preferred result
| Labor | Doug Everingham | | 58.2 | −5.5 |
| Country | Kevin Connor | | 42.8 | +42.8 |
| Labor hold | | Swing | −5.5 | |

=== Darling Downs ===
This section is an excerpt from Electoral results for the Division of Darling Downs § 1972

1972 Australian federal election: Darling Downs
| Party | Candidate | Votes | % | ±% |
|---|---|---|---|---|
| Labor | James Thomas | 18,866 | 36.3 | +3.8 |
| Country | Tom McVeigh | 16,783 | 32.3 | +32.3 |
| Liberal | Colin Brimblecombe | 11,695 | 22.5 | −35.0 |
| Democratic Labor | Eugene Connolly | 3,341 | 6.4 | −3.6 |
| Independent | Ronald Alford | 1,312 | 2.5 | +2.5 |
| Total formal votes | | 51,997 | 98.3 | |
| Informal votes | | 895 | 1.7 | |
| Turnout | | 52,892 | 96.5 | |
Two-party-preferred result
| Country | Tom McVeigh | 31,875 | 61.3 | +61.3 |
| Labor | James Thomas | 20,122 | 38.7 | +3.4 |
| Country gain from Liberal | | Swing | −3.4 | |

=== Dawson ===
This section is an excerpt from Electoral results for the Division of Dawson § 1972

1972 Australian federal election: Dawson
| Party | Candidate | Votes | % | ±% |
|---|---|---|---|---|
| Labor | Rex Patterson | 28,104 | 57.7 | −5.4 |
| Country | Lionel Bevis | 17,998 | 36.9 | +5.0 |
| Democratic Labor | John Judge | 2,618 | 5.4 | +0.4 |
| Total formal votes | | 48,720 | 98.3 | |
| Informal votes | | 821 | 1.7 | |
| Turnout | | 49,541 | 95.7 | |
Two-party-preferred result
| Labor | Rex Patterson | | 58.8 | −5.3 |
| Country | Lionel Bevis | | 41.2 | +5.3 |
| Labor hold | | Swing | −5.3 | |

=== Fisher ===
This section is an excerpt from Electoral results for the Division of Fisher § 1972

1972 Australian federal election: Fisher
| Party | Candidate | Votes | % | ±% |
|---|---|---|---|---|
| Country | Evan Adermann | 28,356 | 50.1 | −8.8 |
| Labor | Hamish Linacre | 20,183 | 35.7 | +0.1 |
| Liberal | John Plowman | 5,494 | 9.7 | +9.7 |
| Democratic Labor | Robert Barron | 2,569 | 4.5 | −1.0 |
| Total formal votes | | 56,602 | 98.4 | |
| Informal votes | | 941 | 1.6 | |
| Turnout | | 57,543 | 96.3 | |
Two-party-preferred result
| Country | Evan Adermann | | 62.4 | −0.9 |
| Labor | Hamish Linacre | | 37.6 | +0.9 |
| Country hold | | Swing | −0.9 | |

=== Griffith ===
This section is an excerpt from Electoral results for the Division of Griffith § 1972

1972 Australian federal election: Griffith
| Party | Candidate | Votes | % | ±% |
|---|---|---|---|---|
| Labor | Eddie Foat | 24,523 | 46.9 | +0.1 |
| Liberal | Don Cameron | 22,649 | 43.4 | −0.6 |
| Democratic Labor | Cecil Birchley | 3,526 | 6.7 | −1.2 |
| Australia | Beth Smith | 1,544 | 3.0 | +3.0 |
| Total formal votes | | 52,242 | 97.7 | |
| Informal votes | | 1,203 | 2.3 | |
| Turnout | | 53,445 | 95.0 | |
Two-party-preferred result
| Liberal | Don Cameron | 26,302 | 50.3 | −1.2 |
| Labor | Eddie Foat | 25,940 | 49.7 | +1.2 |
| Liberal hold | | Swing | −1.2 | |

=== Herbert ===
This section is an excerpt from Electoral results for the Division of Herbert § 1972

1972 Australian federal election: Herbert
| Party | Candidate | Votes | % | ±% |
|---|---|---|---|---|
| Liberal | Robert Bonnett | 22,601 | 44.8 | +2.1 |
| Labor | Fabian Sweeney | 21,873 | 43.3 | −2.8 |
| Democratic Labor | Kiernan Dorney | 4,719 | 9.3 | −1.9 |
| Australia | Leonard Weber | 1,311 | 2.6 | +2.6 |
| Total formal votes | | 50,504 | 98.3 | |
| Informal votes | | 897 | 1.7 | |
| Turnout | | 51,401 | 94.2 | |
Two-party-preferred result
| Liberal | Robert Bonnett | 27,171 | 53.8 | +2.1 |
| Labor | Fabian Sweeney | 23,333 | 46.2 | −2.1 |
| Liberal hold | | Swing | +2.1 | |

=== Kennedy ===
This section is an excerpt from Electoral results for the Division of Kennedy § 1972

1972 Australian federal election: Kennedy
| Party | Candidate | Votes | % | ±% |
|---|---|---|---|---|
| Country | Bob Katter, Sr. | 23,921 | 57.6 | +3.1 |
| Labor | Tony McGrady | 16,261 | 39.1 | −2.8 |
| Democratic Labor | Paul Rutherford | 1,366 | 3.3 | −0.2 |
| Total formal votes | | 41,548 | 98.4 | |
| Informal votes | | 676 | 1.6 | |
| Turnout | | 42,224 | 92.6 | |
Two-party-preferred result
| Country | Bob Katter, Sr. | | 60.2 | +3.7 |
| Labor | Tony McGrady | | 39.8 | −3.7 |
| Country hold | | Swing | +3.7 | |

=== Leichhardt ===
This section is an excerpt from Electoral results for the Division of Leichhardt § 1972

1972 Australian federal election: Leichhardt
| Party | Candidate | Votes | % | ±% |
|---|---|---|---|---|
| Labor | Bill Fulton | 26,697 | 57.9 | −4.4 |
| Country | Walter Schulz | 15,135 | 32.8 | +0.9 |
| Democratic Labor | Bernard Marsh | 2,204 | 5.2 | −0.6 |
| Australia | Patrick Kelly | 1,902 | 4.1 | +4.1 |
| Total formal votes | | 46,138 | 97.4 | |
| Informal votes | | 1,208 | 2.6 | |
| Turnout | | 47,346 | 92.8 | |
Two-party-preferred result
| Labor | Bill Fulton | | 61.4 | −2.1 |
| Country | Walter Schulz | | 38.6 | +2.1 |
| Labor hold | | Swing | −2.1 | |

=== Lilley ===
This section is an excerpt from Electoral results for the Division of Lilley § 1972

1972 Australian federal election: Lilley
| Party | Candidate | Votes | % | ±% |
|---|---|---|---|---|
| Labor | Frank Doyle | 25,236 | 47.2 | +0.1 |
| Liberal | Kevin Cairns | 23,555 | 44.0 | −0.1 |
| Democratic Labor | James Morrissey | 2,970 | 5.5 | −3.2 |
| Australia | David Proud | 1,520 | 2.8 | +2.8 |
| Independent | Ralph Williams | 234 | 0.4 | +0.4 |
| Total formal votes | | 53,515 | 97.7 | |
| Informal votes | | 1,284 | 2.3 | |
| Turnout | | 54,799 | 95.2 | |
Two-party-preferred result
| Labor | Frank Doyle | 26,775 | 50.0 | +1.7 |
| Liberal | Kevin Cairns | 26,740 | 50.0 | −1.7 |
| Labor gain from Liberal | | Swing | +1.7 | |

=== Maranoa ===
This section is an excerpt from Electoral results for the Division of Maranoa § 1972

1972 Australian federal election: Maranoa
| Party | Candidate | Votes | % | ±% |
|---|---|---|---|---|
| Country | James Corbett | 22,863 | 56.6 | +1.2 |
| Labor | Timothy Walker | 14,615 | 36.2 | −2.3 |
| Democratic Labor | Harry Green | 2,327 | 5.8 | −0.3 |
| Independent | James Dwyer | 595 | 1.5 | +1.5 |
| Total formal votes | | 40,400 | 98.2 | |
| Informal votes | | 722 | 1.8 | |
| Turnout | | 41,122 | 94.6 | |
Two-party-preferred result
| Country | James Corbett | | 62.0 | +1.7 |
| Labor | Timothy Walker | | 38.0 | −1.7 |
| Country hold | | Swing | +1.7 | |

=== McPherson ===
This section is an excerpt from Electoral results for the Division of McPherson § 1972

1972 Australian federal election: McPherson
| Party | Candidate | Votes | % | ±% |
|---|---|---|---|---|
| Labor | Tom Veivers | 27,180 | 40.8 | +3.7 |
| Liberal | Eric Robinson | 17,571 | 26.4 | +26.4 |
| Country | Howard Richter | 16,949 | 25.5 | −28.7 |
| Australia | Robert Richardson | 2,009 | 3.0 | +3.0 |
| Democratic Labor | Victor Kearney | 1,978 | 3.0 | −5.7 |
| Independent | John Black | 753 | 1.1 | +1.1 |
| Independent | James Drabsch | 120 | 0.2 | +0.2 |
| Total formal votes | | 66,560 | 97.2 | |
| Informal votes | | 1,903 | 2.8 | |
| Turnout | | 68,463 | 95.0 | |
Two-party-preferred result
| Liberal | Eric Robinson | 36,415 | 54.7 | +54.7 |
| Labor | Tom Veivers | 30,145 | 45.3 | +6.5 |
| Liberal gain from Country | | Swing | −6.5 | |

=== Moreton ===
This section is an excerpt from Electoral results for the Division of Moreton § 1972

1972 Australian federal election: Moreton
| Party | Candidate | Votes | % | ±% |
|---|---|---|---|---|
| Liberal | James Killen | 24,706 | 47.9 | −0.1 |
| Labor | Joe McDonald | 22,071 | 42.8 | −1.6 |
| Democratic Labor | Andrew Jackson | 3,262 | 6.3 | +0.5 |
| Australia | Arthur Smith | 1,507 | 2.9 | +2.9 |
| Total formal votes | | 51,546 | 98.3 | |
| Informal votes | | 906 | 1.7 | |
| Turnout | | 52,452 | 95.2 | |
Two-party-preferred result
| Liberal | James Killen | 28,074 | 54.5 | +1.2 |
| Labor | Joe McDonald | 23,472 | 45.5 | −1.2 |
| Liberal hold | | Swing | +1.2 | |

=== Oxley ===
This section is an excerpt from Electoral results for the Division of Oxley § 1972

1972 Australian federal election: Oxley
| Party | Candidate | Votes | % | ±% |
|---|---|---|---|---|
| Labor | Bill Hayden | 38,372 | 65.8 | −1.3 |
| Liberal | Peter Williams | 17,655 | 30.3 | +3.4 |
| Democratic Labor | Miroslav Jansky | 2,248 | 3.9 | −2.1 |
| Total formal votes | | 58,275 | 97.9 | |
| Informal votes | | 1,233 | 2.1 | |
| Turnout | | 59,508 | 95.9 | |
Two-party-preferred result
| Labor | Bill Hayden | | 66.6 | −2.5 |
| Liberal | Peter Williams | | 33.4 | +2.5 |
| Labor hold | | Swing | −2.5 | |

=== Petrie ===
This section is an excerpt from Electoral results for the Division of Petrie § 1972

1972 Australian federal election: Petrie
| Party | Candidate | Votes | % | ±% |
|---|---|---|---|---|
| Labor | Denis Murphy | 27,942 | 45.2 | +0.9 |
| Liberal | Marshall Cooke | 22,092 | 35.8 | −11.2 |
| Country | Gordon Olive | 6,332 | 10.2 | +10.2 |
| Democratic Labor | Frank Andrews | 3,285 | 5.3 | −0.5 |
| Australia | Alex Dewar | 2,137 | 3.5 | +0.7 |
| Total formal votes | | 61,788 | 98.1 | |
| Informal votes | | 1,215 | 1.9 | |
| Turnout | | 63,003 | 95.7 | |
Two-party-preferred result
| Liberal | Marshall Cooke | 31,709 | 51.3 | −2.6 |
| Labor | Denis Murphy | 30,079 | 48.7 | +2.6 |
| Liberal hold | | Swing | −2.6 | |

=== Ryan ===
This section is an excerpt from Electoral results for the Division of Ryan § 1972

1972 Australian federal election: Ryan
| Party | Candidate | Votes | % | ±% |
|---|---|---|---|---|
| Liberal | Nigel Drury | 27,394 | 46.2 | −3.1 |
| Labor | John Conn | 23,913 | 40.3 | −2.1 |
| Australia | Robert Wensley | 3,811 | 6.4 | +6.4 |
| Democratic Labor | Bert Vann | 3,371 | 5.7 | −2.6 |
| Independent | Alan Jones | 823 | 1.4 | +1.4 |
| Total formal votes | | 59,312 | 98.2 | |
| Informal votes | | 1,070 | 1.8 | |
| Turnout | | 60,382 | 95.6 | |
Two-party-preferred result
| Liberal | Nigel Drury | | 53.9 | −3.2 |
| Labor | John Conn | | 46.1 | +3.2 |
| Liberal hold | | Swing | −3.2 | |

=== Wide Bay ===
This section is an excerpt from Electoral results for the Division of Wide Bay § 1972

1972 Australian federal election: Wide Bay
| Party | Candidate | Votes | % | ±% |
|---|---|---|---|---|
| Labor | Brendan Hansen | 26,572 | 52.2 | −2.9 |
| Country | George Crawford | 21,336 | 41.9 | +0.7 |
| Democratic Labor | Alan Birchley | 2,751 | 5.4 | +1.7 |
| National Socialist | Les Leisemann | 203 | 0.4 | +0.4 |
| Total formal votes | | 50,862 | 98.6 | |
| Informal votes | | 717 | 1.4 | |
| Turnout | | 51,579 | 96.6 | |
Two-party-preferred result
| Labor | Brendan Hansen | | 53.3 | −2.5 |
| Country | George Crawford | | 46.7 | +2.5 |
| Labor hold | | Swing | −2.5 | |

== South Australia ==
1972 Australian federal election (South Australia)
| ← 1969 | 2 December 1972 | 1974 → |

All 12 SA seats in the House of Representatives 6 seats needed for a majority
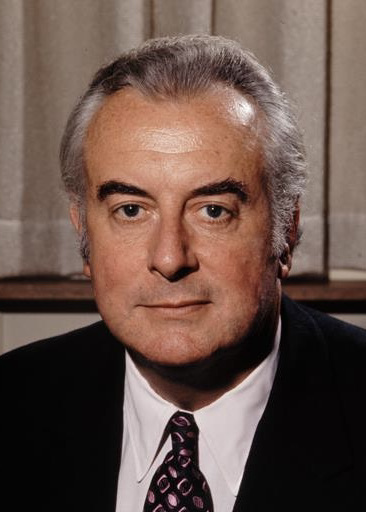

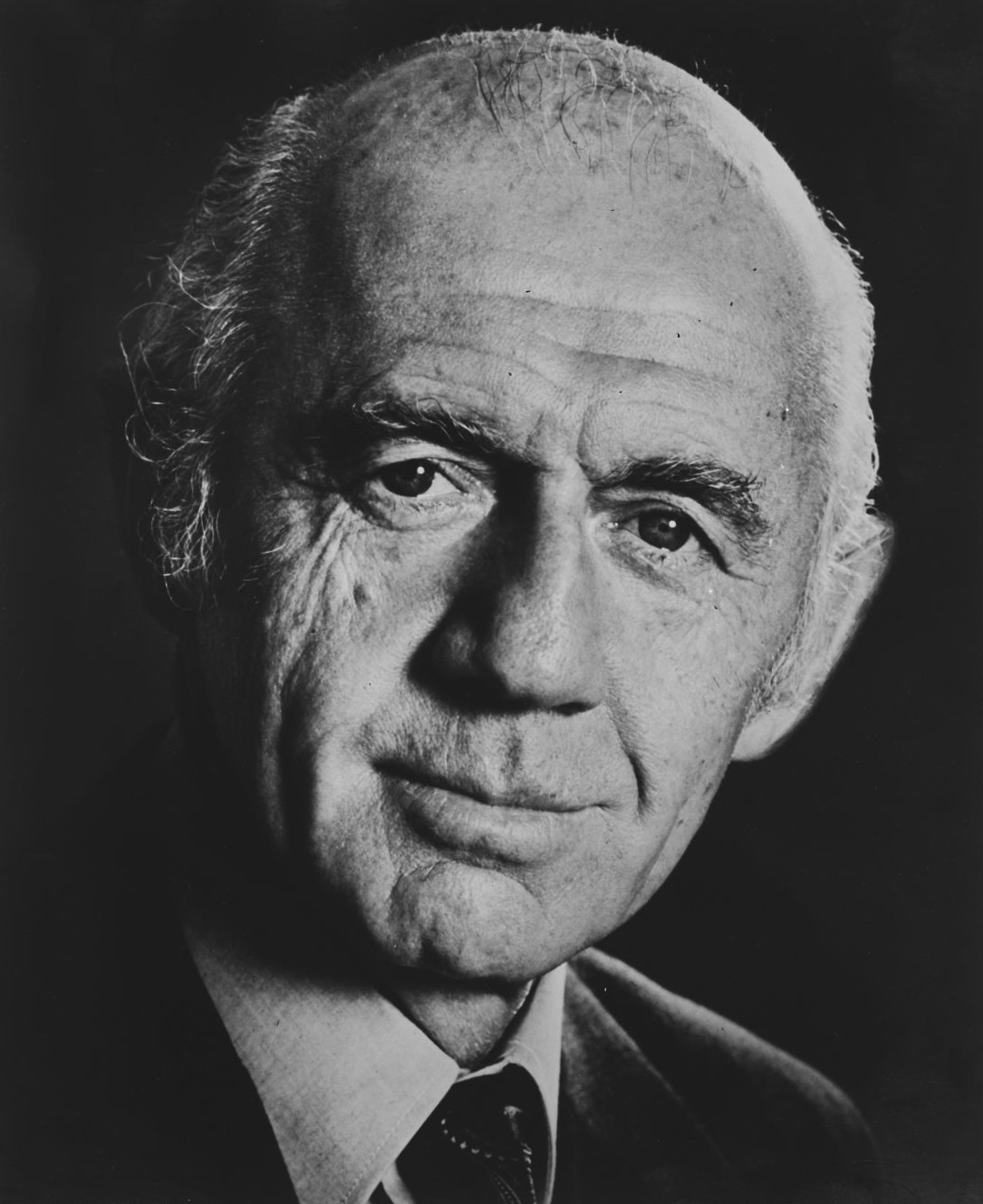
| | First party | Second party |
|---|---|---|
| Leader | Gough Whitlam | William McMahon |
| Party | Labor | Coalition |
| Seats before | 8 | 4 |
| Seats won | 7 | 5 |
| Seat change | ▼1 | ▲1 |
| Popular vote | 317,646 | 273,332 |
| Percentage | 50.6% | 43.5% |
| Swing | ▼1.8pp | ▲1.1pp |
| TPP | 52.7% | 47.3% |
| TPP swing | ▼1.5pp | ▲1.5pp |

=== Adelaide ===
This section is an excerpt from Electoral results for the Division of Adelaide § 1972

1972 Australian federal election: Adelaide
| Party | Candidate | Votes | % | ±% |
|---|---|---|---|---|
| Labor | Chris Hurford | 28,816 | 55.8 | −2.5 |
| Liberal | Keith Ashdown | 20,272 | 39.2 | +4.3 |
| Democratic Labor | George Basisovs | 1,738 | 3.4 | −0.8 |
| Communist | Elliott Johnston | 848 | 1.6 | +1.6 |
| Total formal votes | | 51,674 | 97.1 | |
| Informal votes | | 1,553 | 2.9 | |
| Turnout | | 53,227 | 95.6 | |
Two-party-preferred result
| Labor | Chris Hurford | | 57.9 | −3.4 |
| Liberal | Keith Ashdown | | 42.1 | +3.4 |
| Labor hold | | Swing | −3.4 | |

=== Angas ===
This section is an excerpt from Electoral results for the Division of Angas (1949–1977) § 1949

1972 Australian federal election: Angas
| Party | Candidate | Votes | % | ±% |
|---|---|---|---|---|
| Liberal | Geoffrey Giles | 22,191 | 47.1 | −10.4 |
| Labor | Adolf Thiel | 15,530 | 32.9 | −4.3 |
| Country | John Petch | 7,543 | 16.0 | +16.0 |
| Democratic Labor | Terence Critchley | 1,892 | 4.0 | −1.3 |
| Total formal votes | | 47,156 | 97.0 | |
| Informal votes | | 1,447 | 3.0 | |
| Turnout | | 48,603 | 97.3 | |
Two-party-preferred result
| Liberal | Geoffrey Giles | 30,167 | 64.0 | +2.1 |
| Labor | Adolf Thiel | 16,989 | 36.0 | −2.1 |
| Liberal hold | | Swing | +2.1 | |

=== Barker ===
This section is an excerpt from Electoral results for the Division of Barker § 1972

1972 Australian federal election: Barker
| Party | Candidate | Votes | % | ±% |
|---|---|---|---|---|
| Liberal | Jim Forbes | 29,426 | 56.9 | −0.9 |
| Labor | John Cornwall | 20,622 | 39.8 | −2.4 |
| Democratic Labor | David Le Cornu | 1,705 | 3.3 | +3.3 |
| Total formal votes | | 51,753 | 98.2 | |
| Informal votes | | 928 | 1.8 | |
| Turnout | | 52,681 | 97.1 | |
Two-party-preferred result
| Liberal | Jim Forbes | | 59.5 | +1.7 |
| Labor | John Cornwall | | 40.5 | −1.7 |
| Liberal hold | | Swing | +1.7 | |

=== Bonython ===
This section is an excerpt from Electoral results for the Division of Bonython § 1972

1972 Australian federal election: Bonython
| Party | Candidate | Votes | % | ±% |
|---|---|---|---|---|
| Labor | Martin Nicholls | 37,752 | 61.7 | −2.1 |
| Liberal | Rudolph Masopust | 18,777 | 30.7 | +4.3 |
| Independent | Frank Lawrence | 2,894 | 4.7 | +4.7 |
| Democratic Labor | Peter Meredith | 1,747 | 2.9 | +0.9 |
| Total formal votes | | 61,170 | 96.6 | |
| Informal votes | | 2,168 | 3.4 | |
| Turnout | | 63,338 | 94.6 | |
Two-party-preferred result
| Labor | Martin Nicholls | | 64.1 | −3.5 |
| Liberal | Rudolph Masopust | | 35.9 | +3.5 |
| Labor hold | | Swing | −3.5 | |

=== Boothby ===
This section is an excerpt from Electoral results for the Division of Boothby § 1972

1972 Australian federal election: Boothby
| Party | Candidate | Votes | % | ±% |
|---|---|---|---|---|
| Liberal | John McLeay | 28,523 | 52.4 | −1.1 |
| Labor | Anne Levy | 20,583 | 38.1 | +0.1 |
| Australia | Richard Llewellyn | 3,050 | 5.6 | +3.0 |
| Democratic Labor | Ted Farrell | 2,086 | 3.9 | −0.1 |
| Total formal votes | | 54,042 | 98.1 | |
| Informal votes | | 1,034 | 1.9 | |
| Turnout | | 55,076 | 95.6 | |
Two-party-preferred result
| Liberal | John McLeay | | 57.0 | −1.9 |
| Labor | Anne Levy | | 43.0 | +1.9 |
| Liberal hold | | Swing | −1.9 | |

=== Grey ===
This section is an excerpt from Electoral results for the Division of Grey § 1972

1972 Australian federal election: Grey
| Party | Candidate | Votes | % | ±% |
|---|---|---|---|---|
| Labor | Laurie Wallis | 25,941 | 54.0 | +4.2 |
| Liberal | Pat Rehn | 16,698 | 34.8 | −8.6 |
| Australia | Derek Ball | 3,368 | 7.0 | +4.0 |
| Democratic Labor | David Gray | 2,015 | 4.2 | +0.3 |
| Total formal votes | | 48,022 | 97.6 | |
| Informal votes | | 1,170 | 2.4 | |
| Turnout | | 49,192 | 95.4 | |
Two-party-preferred result
| Labor | Laurie Wallis | | 58.4 | +6.5 |
| Liberal | Pat Rehn | | 41.6 | −6.5 |
| Labor hold | | Swing | +6.5 | |

=== Hawker ===
This section is an excerpt from Electoral results for the Division of Hawker § 1974

1974 Australian federal election: Hawker
| Party | Candidate | Votes | % | ±% |
|---|---|---|---|---|
| Labor | Ralph Jacobi | 31,735 | 55.6 | −0.9 |
| Liberal | Henry Winter | 17,717 | 31.1 | −5.6 |
| Liberal Movement | Peter Holder | 6,744 | 11.8 | +11.8 |
| Australia | Phillip Vickery | 849 | 1.5 | +1.5 |
| Total formal votes | | 57,045 | 97.5 | |
| Informal votes | | 1,481 | 2.5 | |
| Turnout | | 58,526 | 96.3 | |
Two-party-preferred result
| Labor | Ralph Jacobi | | 60.2 | +1.3 |
| Liberal | Henry Winter | | 39.8 | −1.3 |
| Labor hold | | Swing | +1.3 | |

=== Hindmarsh ===
This section is an excerpt from Electoral results for the Division of Hindmarsh § 1972

1972 Australian federal election: Hindmarsh
| Party | Candidate | Votes | % | ±% |
|---|---|---|---|---|
| Labor | Clyde Cameron | 33,551 | 62.7 | −5.3 |
| Liberal | Ivan Denchev | 17,009 | 31.8 | +3.3 |
| Democratic Labor | Paul Hubert | 2,935 | 5.5 | +2.6 |
| Total formal votes | | 53,495 | 96.7 | |
| Informal votes | | 1,827 | 3.3 | |
| Turnout | | 55,322 | 96.0 | |
Two-party-preferred result
| Labor | Clyde Cameron | | 63.8 | −5.0 |
| Liberal | Ivan Denchev | | 36.2 | +5.0 |
| Labor hold | | Swing | −5.0 | |

=== Kingston ===
This section is an excerpt from Electoral results for the Division of Kingston § 1972

1972 Australian federal election: Kingston
| Party | Candidate | Votes | % | ±% |
|---|---|---|---|---|
| Labor | Richard Gun | 30,169 | 51.9 | −1.5 |
| Liberal | Peter Tonkin | 25,657 | 44.2 | +1.3 |
| Democratic Labor | Mark Posa | 2,251 | 3.9 | +0.2 |
| Total formal votes | | 58,077 | 98.3 | |
| Informal votes | | 1,005 | 1.7 | |
| Turnout | | 59,082 | 96.4 | |
Two-party-preferred result
| Labor | Richard Gun | | 52.7 | −1.2 |
| Liberal | Peter Tonkin | | 47.3 | +1.2 |
| Labor hold | | Swing | −1.2 | |

=== Port Adelaide ===
This section is an excerpt from Electoral results for the Division of Port Adelaide § 1972

1972 Australian federal election: Port Adelaide
| Party | Candidate | Votes | % | ±% |
|---|---|---|---|---|
| Labor | Fred Birrell | 35,572 | 69.7 | −0.8 |
| Liberal | Ian Fotheringham | 12,398 | 24.3 | +2.0 |
| Democratic Labor | Leon Dalle-Nogare | 2,085 | 4.1 | +4.1 |
| Independent | James Mitchell | 996 | 2.0 | +2.0 |
| Total formal votes | | 51,051 | 96.0 | |
| Informal votes | | 2,105 | 4.0 | |
| Turnout | | 53,156 | 96.1 | |
Two-party-preferred result
| Labor | Fred Birrell | | 71.5 | −2.0 |
| Liberal | Ian Fotheringham | | 28.5 | +2.0 |
| Labor hold | | Swing | −2.0 | |

=== Sturt ===
This section is an excerpt from Electoral results for the Division of Sturt § 1972

1972 Australian federal election: Sturt
| Party | Candidate | Votes | % | ±% |
|---|---|---|---|---|
| Liberal | Ian Wilson | 28,056 | 50.5 | +3.0 |
| Labor | Norm Foster | 25,689 | 46.2 | −3.8 |
| Democratic Labor | Walter Doran | 1,479 | 2.7 | +0.3 |
| National Socialist | Peter Wilkinson | 321 | 0.6 | +0.6 |
| Total formal votes | | 55,545 | 97.5 | |
| Informal votes | | 1,411 | 2.5 | |
| Turnout | | 56,956 | 96.8 | |
Two-party-preferred result
| Liberal | Ian Wilson | | 52.2 | +2.7 |
| Labor | Norm Foster | | 47.8 | −2.7 |
| Liberal gain from Labor | | Swing | +2.7 | |

=== Wakefield ===
This section is an excerpt from Electoral results for the Division of Wakefield § 1972

1972 Australian federal election: Wakefield
| Party | Candidate | Votes | % | ±% |
|---|---|---|---|---|
| Liberal | Bert Kelly | 21,211 | 49.7 | −8.4 |
| Labor | Terence de Lacy | 13,643 | 32.0 | −4.9 |
| Country | James Shannon | 6,448 | 15.1 | +15.1 |
| Democratic Labor | John McMahon | 1,365 | 3.2 | −1.7 |
| Total formal votes | | 42,667 | 97.8 | |
| Informal votes | | 968 | 2.2 | |
| Turnout | | 43,635 | 95.1 | |
Two-party-preferred result
| Liberal | Bert Kelly | | 65.9 | +3.9 |
| Labor | Terence de Lacy | | 34.1 | −3.9 |
| Liberal hold | | Swing | +3.9 | |

== Western Australia ==
1972 Australian federal election (Western Australia)
| ← 1969 | 2 December 1972 | 1974 → |

All 9 WA seats in the House of Representatives 5 seats needed for a majority
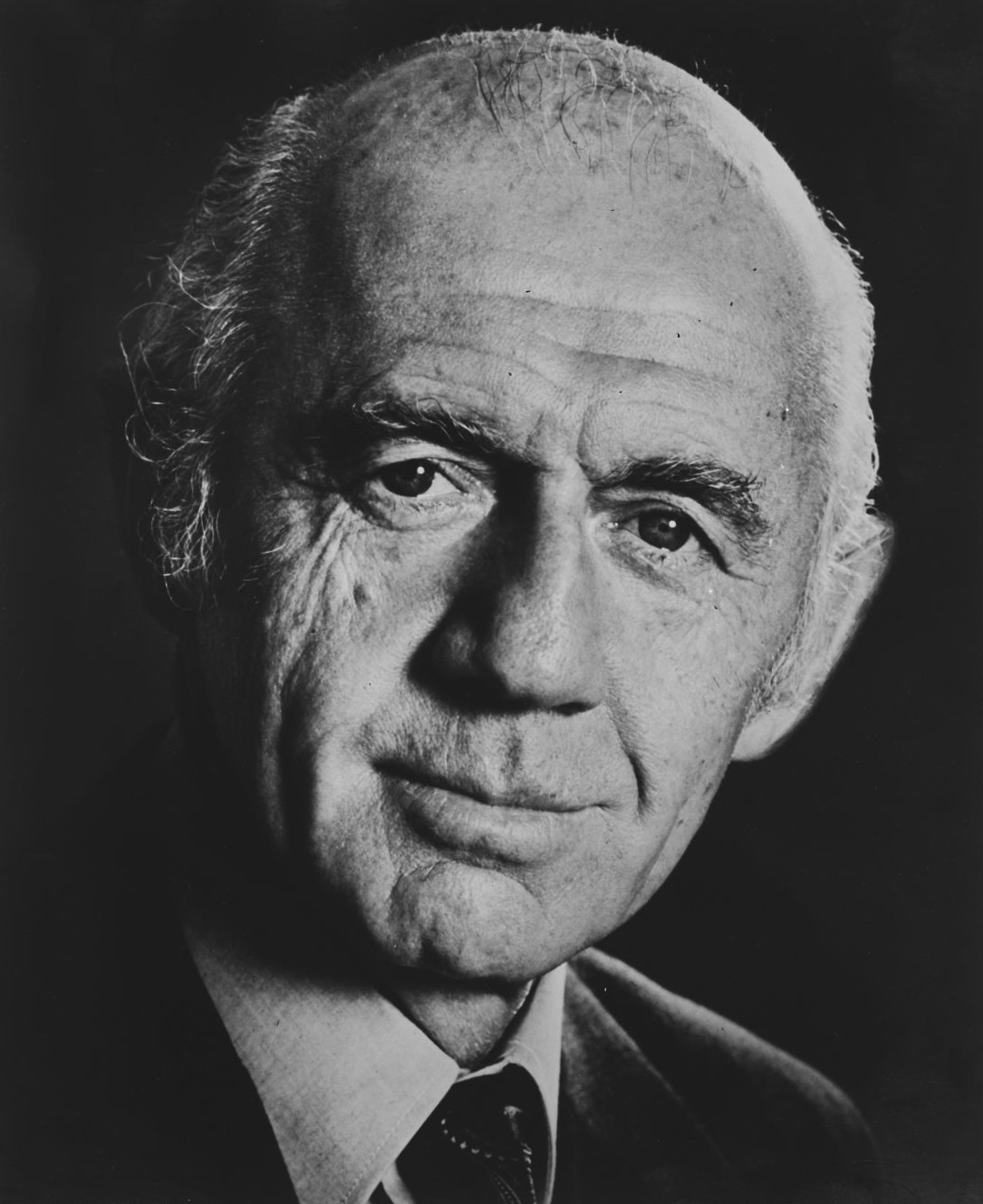

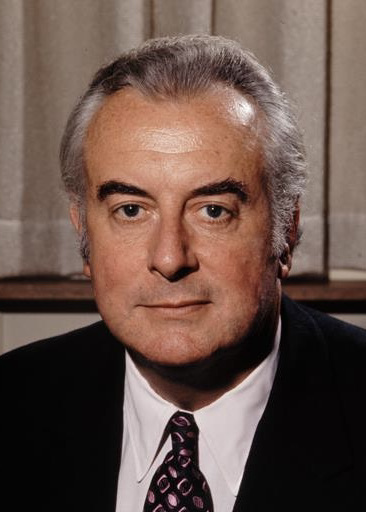
| | First party | Second party |
|---|---|---|
| Leader | William McMahon | Gough Whitlam |
| Party | Coalition | Labor |
| Seats before | 3 | 6 |
| Seats won | 5 | 4 |
| Seat change | ▲2 | ▼2 |
| Popular vote | 233,891 | 226,398 |
| Percentage | 47.6% | 46.1% |
| Swing | ▲5.1pp | ▼3.9pp |
| TPP | 51.7% | 48.3% |
| TPP swing | ▲4.3pp | ▼4.3pp |

=== Canning ===
This section is an excerpt from Electoral results for the Division of Canning § 1972

1972 Australian federal election: Canning
| Party | Candidate | Votes | % | ±% |
|---|---|---|---|---|
| Labor | Allan Scott | 23,398 | 39.6 | −2.6 |
| Liberal | Ian Pratt | 15,873 | 26.9 | +4.6 |
| Country | John Hallett | 15,461 | 26.2 | −3.9 |
| Democratic Labor | Patrick Hickey | 1,558 | 2.6 | −2.8 |
| Australia | Thomas Hartigan | 1,436 | 2.4 | +2.4 |
| Independent | Brian Burns | 1,301 | 2.2 | +2.2 |
| Total formal votes | | 59,027 | 96.2 | |
| Informal votes | | 2,335 | 3.8 | |
| Turnout | | 61,362 | 94.6 | |
Two-party-preferred result
| Country | John Hallett | 33,032 | 56.0 | +1.2 |
| Labor | Allan Scott | 25,995 | 44.0 | −1.2 |
| Country hold | | Swing | +1.2 | |

=== Curtin ===
This section is an excerpt from Electoral results for the Division of Curtin § 1972

1972 Australian federal election: Curtin
| Party | Candidate | Votes | % | ±% |
|---|---|---|---|---|
| Liberal | Victor Garland | 29,131 | 58.5 | +8.7 |
| Labor | Sue Neacy | 15,373 | 30.9 | −3.7 |
| Australia | Maurene Locke | 2,652 | 5.3 | +3.0 |
| Democratic Labor | Peter McGowan | 2,634 | 5.3 | −1.8 |
| Total formal votes | | 49,790 | 98.0 | |
| Informal votes | | 1,037 | 2.0 | |
| Turnout | | 50,827 | 93.6 | |
Two-party-preferred result
| Liberal | Victor Garland | | 64.9 | +4.8 |
| Labor | Sue Neacy | | 35.1 | −4.8 |
| Liberal hold | | Swing | +4.8 | |

=== Forrest ===
This section is an excerpt from Electoral results for the Division of Forrest § 1972

1972 Australian federal election: Forrest
| Party | Candidate | Votes | % | ±% |
|---|---|---|---|---|
| Labor | Frank Kirwan | 20,843 | 43.6 | −4.0 |
| Liberal | Peter Drummond | 15,304 | 32.0 | −10.9 |
| Country | David Reid | 9,723 | 20.3 | +20.3 |
| Democratic Labor | John Fleeton | 1,483 | 3.1 | −4.1 |
| Australia | Russell Moffet | 455 | 1.0 | −1.4 |
| Total formal votes | | 47,808 | 97.7 | |
| Informal votes | | 1,143 | 2.3 | |
| Turnout | | 48,951 | 95.9 | |
Two-party-preferred result
| Liberal | Peter Drummond | 25,615 | 53.6 | +4.7 |
| Labor | Frank Kirwan | 22,193 | 46.4 | −4.7 |
| Liberal gain from Labor | | Swing | +4.7 | |

=== Fremantle ===
This section is an excerpt from Electoral results for the Division of Fremantle § 1972

1972 Australian federal election: Fremantle
| Party | Candidate | Votes | % | ±% |
|---|---|---|---|---|
| Labor | Kim Beazley Sr. | 32,803 | 56.6 | −6.7 |
| Liberal | Erica Lawton | 22,637 | 39.0 | +6.7 |
| Democratic Labor | Rosemary Tobori | 1,764 | 3.0 | −1.5 |
| Communist | Jack Marks | 786 | 1.4 | +1.4 |
| Total formal votes | | 57,990 | 97.5 | |
| Informal votes | | 1,515 | 2.5 | |
| Turnout | | 59,505 | 94.8 | |
Two-party-preferred result
| Labor | Kim Beazley Sr. | | 58.5 | −5.7 |
| Liberal | Erica Lawton | | 41.5 | +5.7 |
| Labor hold | | Swing | −5.7 | |

=== Kalgoorlie ===
This section is an excerpt from Electoral results for the Division of Kalgoorlie § 1972

1972 Australian federal election: Kalgoorlie
| Party | Candidate | Votes | % | ±% |
|---|---|---|---|---|
| Labor | Fred Collard | 26,648 | 58.8 | −0.2 |
| Liberal | Gerald Gloster | 15,837 | 35.0 | −0.9 |
| Democratic Labor | Geoffrey Sands | 2,801 | 6.2 | +1.1 |
| Total formal votes | | 45,286 | 97.5 | |
| Informal votes | | 1,182 | 2.5 | |
| Turnout | | 46,468 | 89.4 | |
Two-party-preferred result
| Labor | Fred Collard | | 60.0 | +0.0 |
| Liberal | Gerald Gloster | | 40.0 | +0.0 |
| Labor hold | | Swing | +0.0 | |

=== Moore ===
This section is an excerpt from Electoral results for the Division of Moore § 1972

1972 Australian federal election: Moore
| Party | Candidate | Votes | % | ±% |
|---|---|---|---|---|
| Labor | Peter Walsh | 21,074 | 38.7 | −3.1 |
| Country | Don Maisey | 15,647 | 28.8 | −2.2 |
| Liberal | John Hyde | 15,197 | 27.9 | +6.0 |
| Democratic Labor | Benjamin Ballantyne | 2,480 | 4.6 | −0.7 |
| Total formal votes | | 54,398 | 97.5 | |
| Informal votes | | 1,380 | 2.5 | |
| Turnout | | 55,778 | 95.3 | |
Two-party-preferred result
| Country | Don Maisey | 32,144 | 59.1 | +3.6 |
| Labor | Peter Walsh | 22,254 | 40.9 | −3.6 |
| Country hold | | Swing | +3.6 | |

=== Perth ===
This section is an excerpt from Electoral results for the Division of Perth § 1972

1972 Australian federal election: Perth
| Party | Candidate | Votes | % | ±% |
|---|---|---|---|---|
| Labor | Joe Berinson | 28,226 | 51.3 | −3.8 |
| Liberal | Derrick Tomlinson | 23,911 | 43.4 | +5.1 |
| Democratic Labor | Dorothy Cranley | 2,928 | 5.3 | +1.2 |
| Total formal votes | | 55,065 | 97.1 | |
| Informal votes | | 1,623 | 2.9 | |
| Turnout | | 56,688 | 92.3 | |
Two-party-preferred result
| Labor | Joe Berinson | | 52.4 | −5.8 |
| Liberal | Derrick Tomlinson | | 47.6 | +5.8 |
| Labor hold | | Swing | −5.8 | |

=== Stirling ===
This section is an excerpt from Electoral results for the Division of Stirling § 1972

1972 Australian federal election: Stirling
| Party | Candidate | Votes | % | ±% |
|---|---|---|---|---|
| Liberal | Ian Viner | 30,446 | 47.3 | +9.7 |
| Labor | Harry Webb | 29,686 | 46.1 | −7.0 |
| Democratic Labor | Brian Peachey | 4,243 | 6.6 | +0.2 |
| Total formal votes | | 64,375 | 97.9 | |
| Informal votes | | 1,414 | 2.1 | |
| Turnout | | 65,789 | 94.6 | |
Two-party-preferred result
| Liberal | Ian Viner | 34,029 | 52.9 | +8.4 |
| Labor | Harry Webb | 30,346 | 47.1 | −8.4 |
| Liberal gain from Labor | | Swing | +8.4 | |

=== Swan ===
This section is an excerpt from Electoral results for the Division of Swan § 1972

1972 Australian federal election: Swan
| Party | Candidate | Votes | % | ±% |
|---|---|---|---|---|
| Labor | Adrian Bennett | 28,347 | 49.5 | −2.7 |
| Liberal | Richard Cleaver | 24,724 | 43.2 | +1.7 |
| Democratic Labor | David Milne | 2,163 | 3.8 | −0.9 |
| Australia | Archelaus Marshall | 1,075 | 1.9 | +0.3 |
| Independent | David Smith | 921 | 1.6 | +1.6 |
| Total formal votes | | 57,230 | 97.1 | |
| Informal votes | | 1,699 | 2.9 | |
| Turnout | | 58,929 | 93.8 | |
Two-party-preferred result
| Labor | Adrian Bennett | | 52.2 | −1.9 |
| Liberal | Richard Cleaver | | 47.8 | +1.9 |
| Labor hold | | Swing | −1.9 | |

== Tasmania ==
1972 Australian federal election (Tasmania)
| ← 1969 | 2 December 1972 | 1974 → |

All 5 Tasmanian seats in the House of Representatives 3 seats needed for a majority
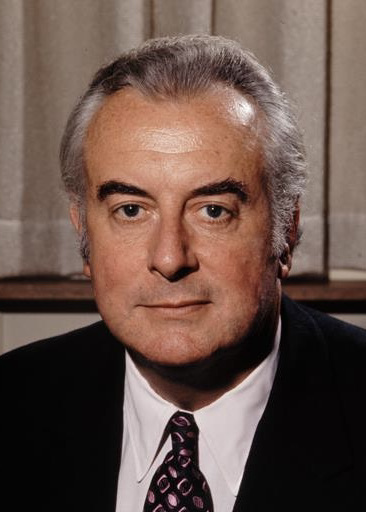

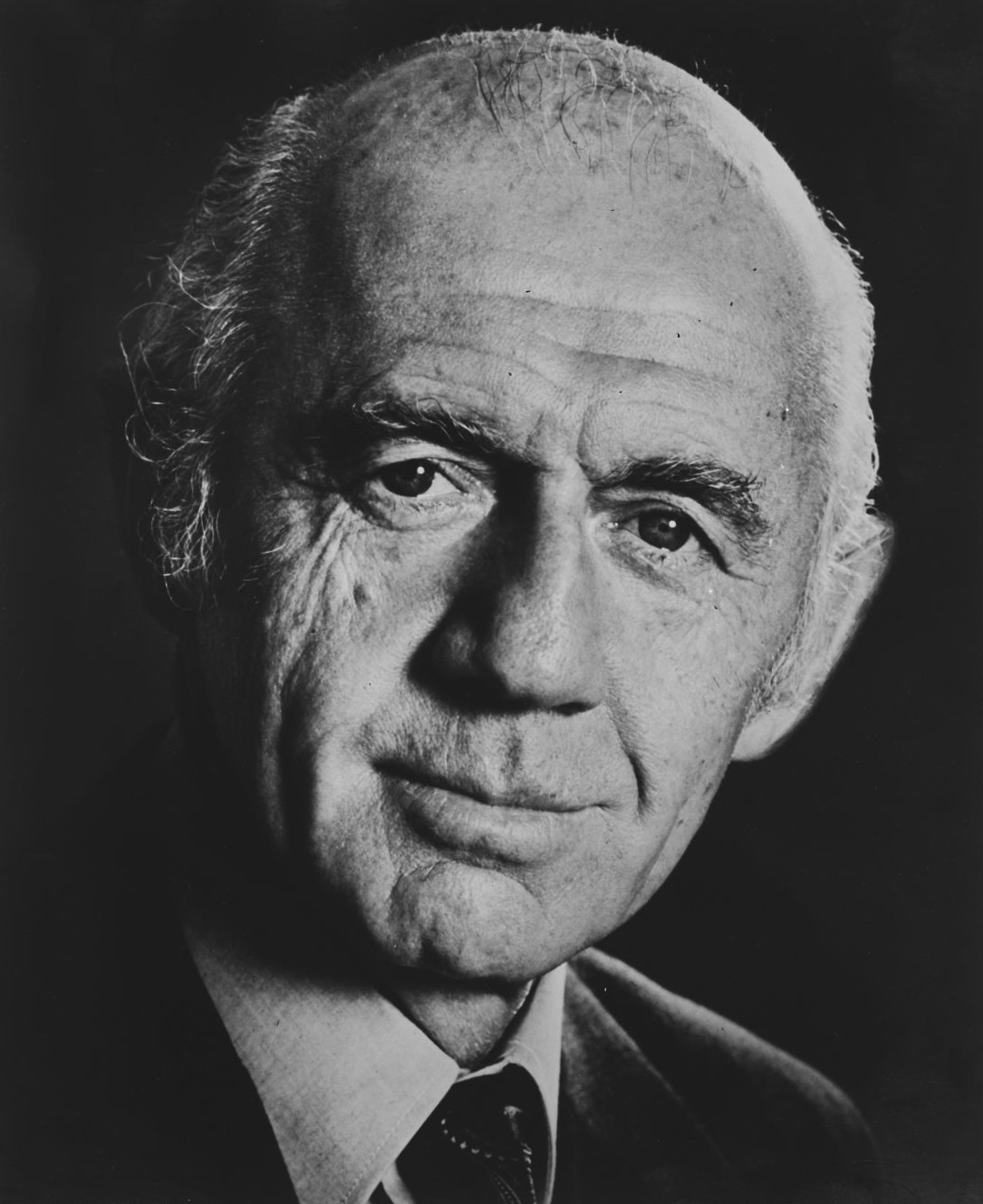
| | First party | Second party |
|---|---|---|
| Leader | Gough Whitlam | William McMahon |
| Party | Labor | Coalition |
| Seats before | 4 | 1 |
| Seats won | 5 | 0 |
| Seat change | ▲1 | ▼1 |
| Popular vote | 123,814 | 73,166 |
| Percentage | 58.9% | 34.8% |
| Swing | ▲6.2pp | ▼1.4pp |
| TPP | 60.5% | 39.5% |
| TPP swing | ▲4.4pp | ▼4.4pp |

=== Bass ===
This section is an excerpt from Electoral results for the Division of Bass § 1972

1972 Australian federal election: Bass
| Party | Candidate | Votes | % | ±% |
|---|---|---|---|---|
| Labor | Lance Barnard | 23,439 | 58.8 | +6.6 |
| Liberal | John Beswick | 14,661 | 36.8 | −4.4 |
| Democratic Labor | Jindrich Nermut | 1,783 | 4.5 | +4.5 |
| Total formal votes | | 39,883 | 98.4 | |
| Informal votes | | 636 | 1.6 | |
| Turnout | | 40,519 | 96.9 | |
Two-party-preferred result
| Labor | Lance Barnard | | 59.7 | +4.7 |
| Liberal | John Beswick | | 40.3 | −4.7 |
| Labor hold | | Swing | +4.7 | |

=== Braddon ===
This section is an excerpt from Electoral results for the Division of Braddon § 1972

1972 Australian federal election: Braddon
| Party | Candidate | Votes | % | ±% |
|---|---|---|---|---|
| Labor | Ron Davies | 27,502 | 62.2 | −0.5 |
| Liberal | William Luck | 15,210 | 34.4 | +1.8 |
| Democratic Labor | Dudley McNamara | 1,506 | 3.4 | −1.3 |
| Total formal votes | | 44,218 | 98.5 | |
| Informal votes | | 676 | 1.5 | |
| Turnout | | 44,894 | 96.6 | |
Two-party-preferred result
| Labor | Ron Davies | | 62.9 | −0.7 |
| Liberal | William Luck | | 37.1 | +0.7 |
| Labor hold | | Swing | −0.7 | |

=== Denison ===
This section is an excerpt from Electoral results for the Division of Denison § 1972

1972 Australian federal election: Denison
| Party | Candidate | Votes | % | ±% |
|---|---|---|---|---|
| Labor | John Coates | 21,286 | 49.5 | +11.9 |
| Liberal | Robert Solomon | 17,074 | 39.7 | +11.2 |
| Independent | Brian Broadby | 1,915 | 4.5 | +4.5 |
| Democratic Labor | Michael Delaney | 1,630 | 3.8 | −1.8 |
| Australia | Bill Scetrine | 1,076 | 2.5 | +2.5 |
| Total formal votes | | 42,981 | 98.0 | |
| Informal votes | | 873 | 2.0 | |
| Turnout | | 43,854 | 97.2 | |
Two-party-preferred result
| Labor | John Coates | | 54.6 | +7.2 |
| Liberal | Robert Solomon | | 45.4 | −7.2 |
| Labor gain from Liberal | | Swing | +7.2 | |

=== Franklin ===
This section is an excerpt from Electoral results for the Division of Franklin § 1972

1972 Australian federal election: Franklin
| Party | Candidate | Votes | % | ±% |
|---|---|---|---|---|
| Labor | Ray Sherry | 26,512 | 64.2 | +9.6 |
| Liberal | William Craig | 13,150 | 31.9 | −7.9 |
| Democratic Labor | Keith Kelly | 1,610 | 3.9 | −0.2 |
| Total formal votes | | 41,272 | 98.7 | |
| Informal votes | | 542 | 1.3 | |
| Turnout | | 41,814 | 97.8 | |
Two-party-preferred result
| Labor | Ray Sherry | | 65.0 | +9.1 |
| Liberal | William Craig | | 35.0 | −9.1 |
| Labor hold | | Swing | +9.1 | |

=== Wilmot ===
This section is an excerpt from Electoral results for the Division of Wilmot § 1972

1972 Australian federal election: Wilmot
| Party | Candidate | Votes | % | ±% |
|---|---|---|---|---|
| Labor | Gil Duthie | 25,075 | 60.1 | +3.8 |
| Liberal | Ian Hardy | 13,071 | 31.3 | −8.2 |
| Democratic Labor | Ronald Butterworth | 3,557 | 8.5 | +4.3 |
| Total formal votes | | 41,703 | 98.4 | |
| Informal votes | | 666 | 1.6 | |
| Turnout | | 42,369 | 97.5 | |
Two-party-preferred result
| Labor | Gil Duthie | | 62.6 | +5.5 |
| Liberal | Ian Hardy | | 37.4 | −5.5 |
| Labor hold | | Swing | +5.5 | |

== Territories ==
=== Australian Capital Territory ===
1972 Australian federal election (Australian Capital Territory)
| ← 1969 | 2 December 1972 | 1974 → |

Division of Australian Capital Territory
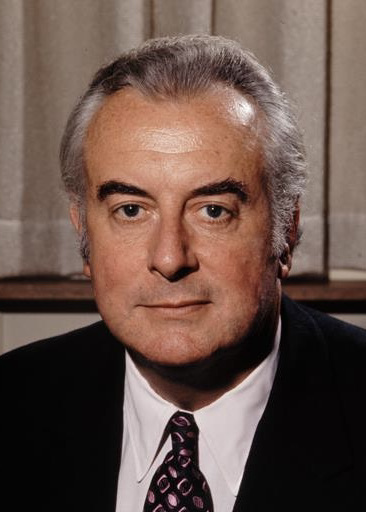

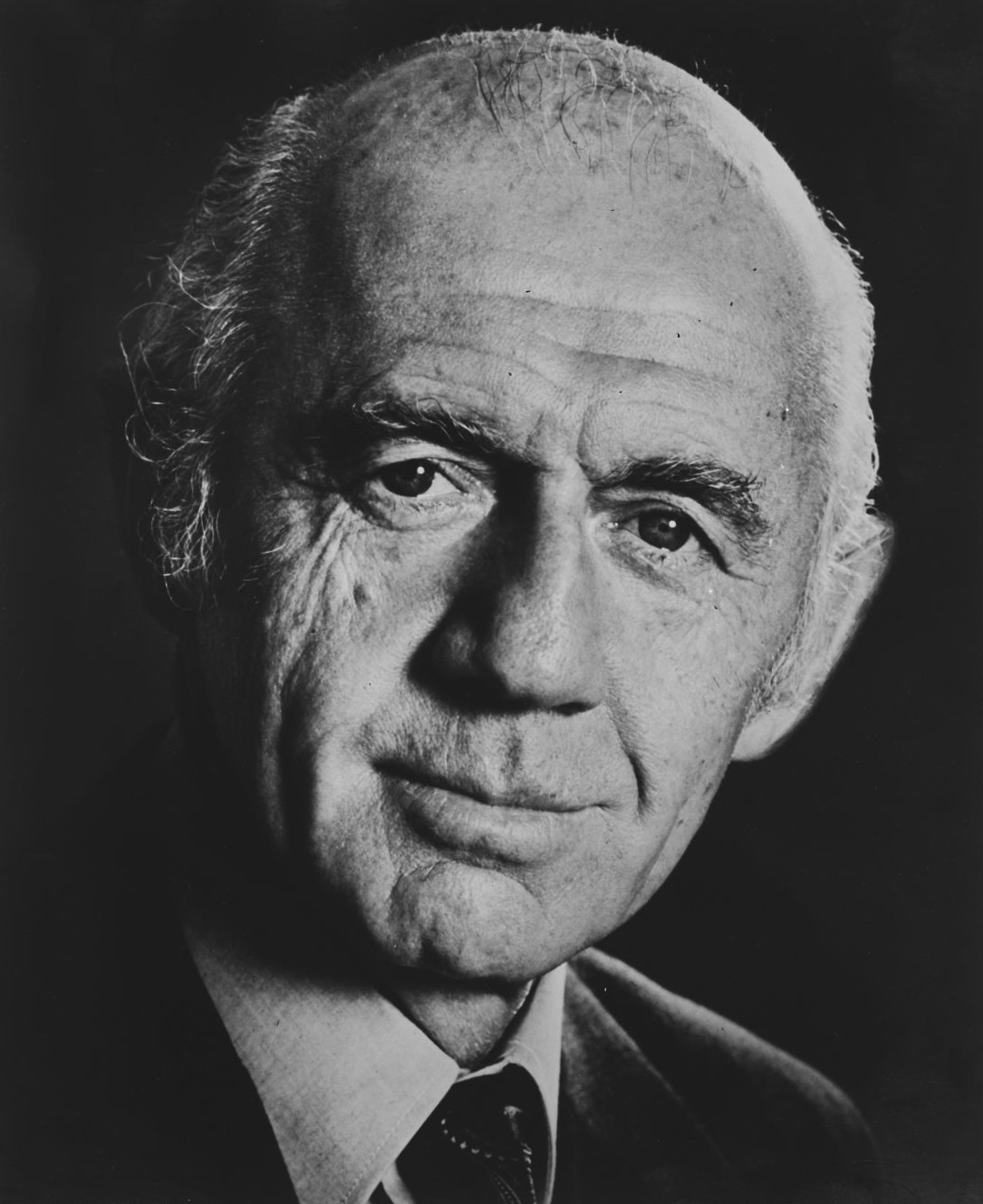
| | First party | Second party |
|---|---|---|
| Leader | Gough Whitlam | William McMahon |
| Party | Labor | Coalition |
| Seats before | 1 | 0 |
| Seats won | 1 | 0 |
| Seat change | Steady | Steady |
| Popular vote | 40,147 | 17,556 |
| Percentage | 52.1% | 22.8% |
| Swing | ▼15.6pp | ▼4.1pp |
| TPP | 65.5% | 34.5% |
| TPP swing | ▼5.7pp | ▲5.7pp |

This section is an excerpt from Electoral results for the Division of Australian Capital Territory § 1972

1972 Australian federal election: Australian Capital Territory
| Party | Candidate | Votes | % | ±% |
|---|---|---|---|---|
| Labor | Kep Enderby | 40,147 | 52.1 | −15.6 |
| Liberal | Peter Hughes | 17,556 | 22.8 | −4.1 |
| Australia | Alan Fitzgerald | 10,529 | 13.7 | +9.1 |
| Independent | Arthur Burns | 3,133 | 4.1 | +4.1 |
| Democratic Labor | Terence Christie | 2,758 | 3.6 | +3.6 |
| Independent | Pat Eatock | 2,003 | 2.6 | +2.6 |
| Independent | Michael Salvador | 140 | 0.2 | +0.2 |
| Independent | Harry Marsh | 67 | 0.1 | +0.1 |
| Total formal votes | | 77,003 | 98.1 | |
| Informal votes | | 1,506 | 1.9 | |
| Turnout | | 78,509 | 93.9 | |
Two-party-preferred result
| Labor | Kep Enderby | | 65.5 | −5.7 |
| Liberal | Peter Hughes | | 34.5 | +5.7 |
| Labor hold | | Swing | −5.7 | |

=== Northern Territory ===
1972 Australian federal election (Northern Territory)
| ← 1969 | 2 December 1972 | 1974 → |

Division of Northern Territory
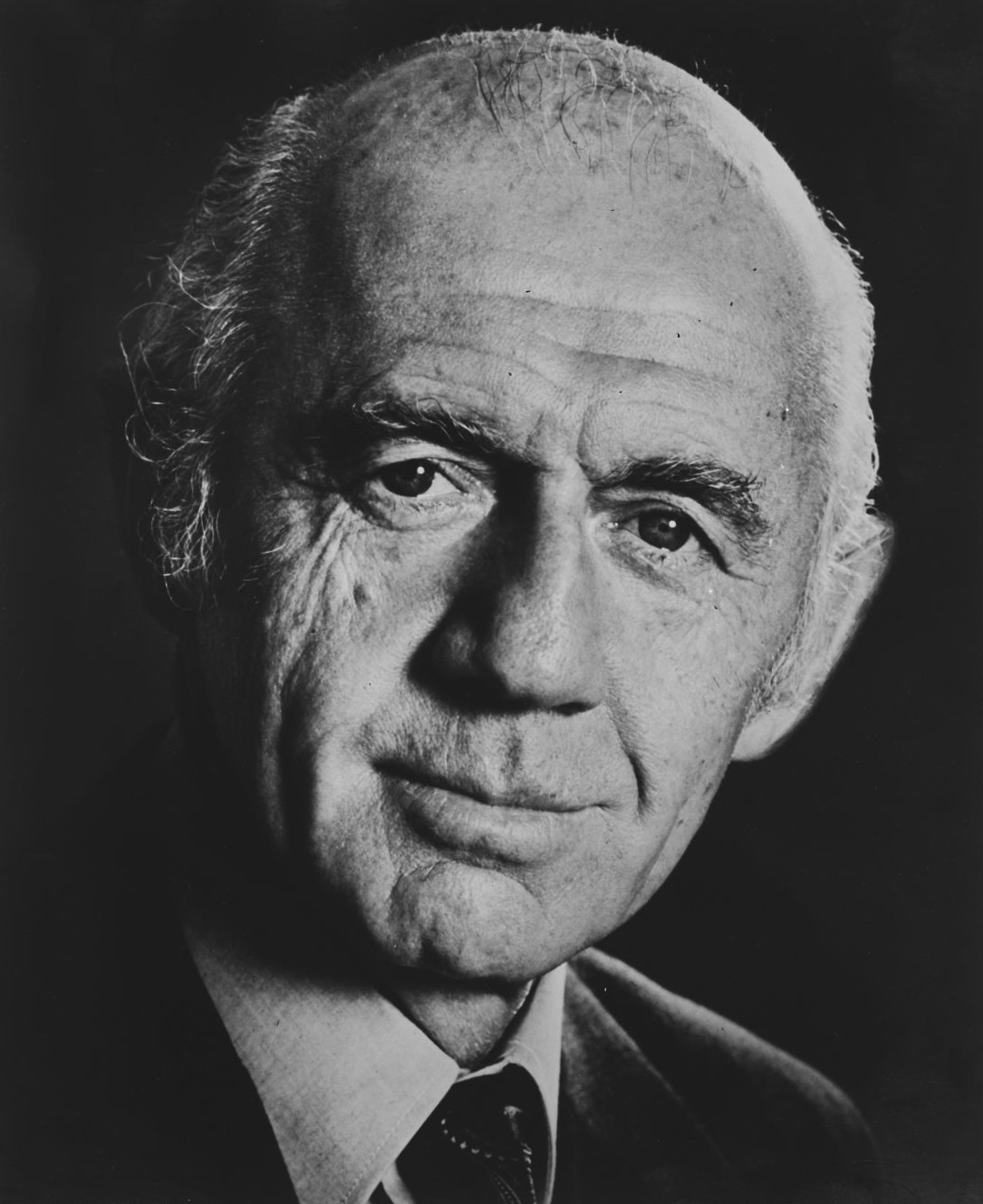

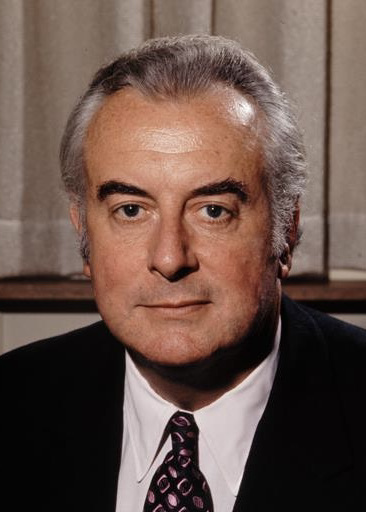
| | First party | Second party |
|---|---|---|
| Leader | William McMahon | Gough Whitlam |
| Party | Coalition | Labor |
| Seats before | 1 | 0 |
| Seats won | 1 | 0 |
| Seat change | Steady | Steady |
| Popular vote | 11,657 | 9,676 |
| Percentage | 47.3% | 39.3% |
| Swing | ▼1.1pp | ▲8.9pp |
| TPP | 54.5% | 45.5% |
| TPP swing | ▼4.7pp | ▲4.7pp |

This section is an excerpt from Electoral results for the Division of Northern Territory § 1972

1972 Australian federal election: Northern Territory
| Party | Candidate | Votes | % | ±% |
|---|---|---|---|---|
| Country | Sam Calder | 11,657 | 47.3 | −1.1 |
| Labor | Ted Robertson | 9,676 | 39.3 | +8.9 |
| Independent | Alexander Allan-Stewart | 1,821 | 7.4 | +7.4 |
| Australia | Gordon Briscoe | 944 | 3.8 | +3.8 |
| Independent | William Walsh | 349 | 1.4 | +1.4 |
| Australia | Charles Moffatt | 185 | 0.8 | +0.8 |
| Total formal votes | | 24,632 | 95.4 | |
| Informal votes | | 1,176 | 4.6 | |
| Turnout | | 25,808 | 86.2 | |
Two-party-preferred result
| Country | Sam Calder | 13,416 | 54.5 | −4.7 |
| Labor | Ted Robertson | 11,216 | 45.5 | +4.7 |
| Country hold | | Swing | −4.7 | |

== See also ==
- Candidates of the 1972 Australian federal election
- Members of the Australian House of Representatives, 1972–1974
