= 1974 Australian House of Representatives election =

This is a list of electoral division results for the Australian 1974 federal election.

== Overall ==
This section is an excerpt from 1974 Australian federal election § House of Representatives results

Government (66) Labor (66) Opposition (61) Coalition Liberal (40) Country (21)

House of Reps (IRV) – 1974–75 – Turnout 95.42% (CV) – Informal 1.92%
Party	Votes	%	Swing	Seats	Change
Labor	3,644,110	49.30	▼−0.29	66	−1
Liberal–Country coalition	3,379,545	45.73	▲+4.25	61	+3
Liberal	2,582,968	34.95	▲+2.91	40	+2
Country	736,252	9.96	▲+0.52	21	+1
National Alliance	60,325	0.82	*	0	-2
Australia	172,176	2.33	▼−0.09	0	0
Democratic Labor	104,974	1.42	▼−3.83	0	0
Liberal Movement	57,817	0.78	*	0	0
Socialist	1,132	0.02	+0.00	0	0
Republican	934	0.01	*	0	0
Communist	539	0.01	▼–0.11	0	0
Independents	29,779	0.40	▼–0.56	0	0
Total	7,391,006			127	+2
Two-party-preferred (estimated)
Labor	Win	51.70	▼−1.00	66	−1
Liberal–Country coalition		48.30	▲+1.00	61	+3

Notes

- The National Alliance was an electoral alliance of the Country Party and the Democratic Labor Party in Western Australia. It defended two seats that had elected the Country Party in 1972 but lost them both.

Popular vote
Labor	49.30%
Liberal	34.95%
Country/NA	10.78%
Australia	2.33%
DLP	1.42%
Other	2.04%

Two-party-preferred vote
Labor	51.70%
Coalition	48.30%

Parliament seats
Labor	51.97%
Coalition	48.03%

== New South Wales ==
1974 Australian federal election (New South Wales)
← 1972	18 May 1974	1975 →

All 45 NSW seats in the House of Representatives 23 seats needed for a majority
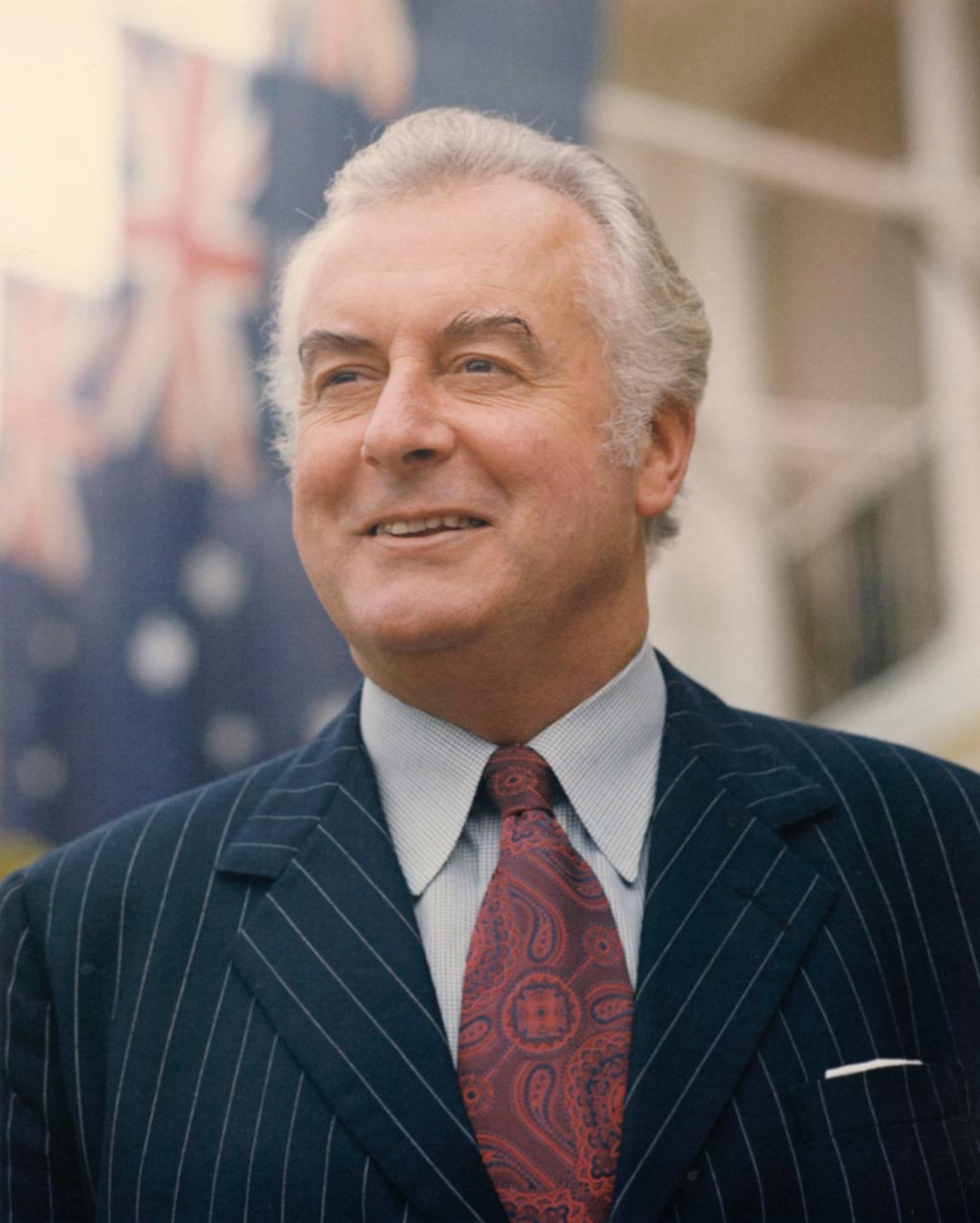

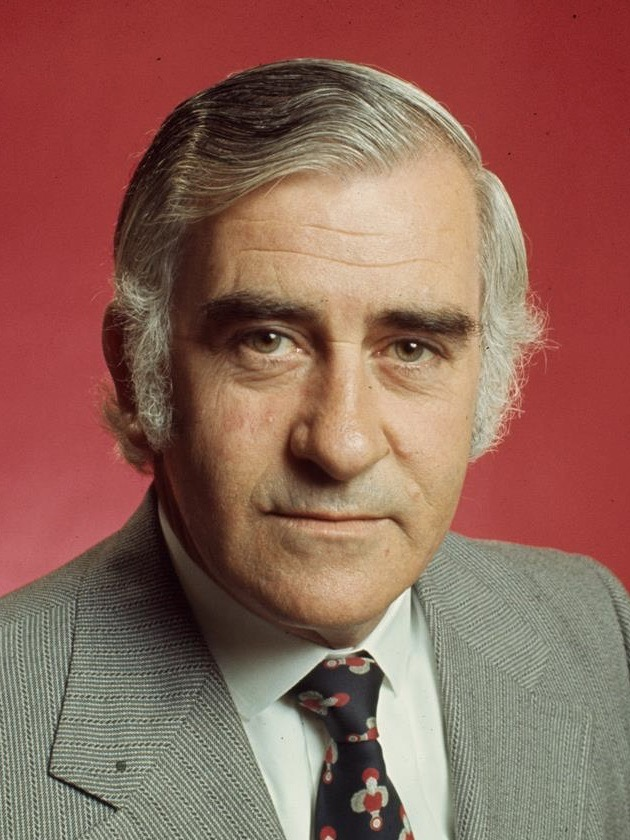
	First party	Second party
Leader	Gough Whitlam	Billy Snedden
Party	Labor	Coalition
Seats before	27	17
Seats won	25	20
Seat change	▼3	▲3
Popular vote	1,400,255	1,169,371
Percentage	52.7%	44.0%
Swing	▲0.8pp	▲4.2pp
TPP	54.9%	45.1%
TPP swing	▼0.5pp	▲0.5pp

=== Banks ===
This section is an excerpt from Electoral results for the Division of Banks § 1974

1974 Australian federal election: Banks
Party	Candidate	Votes	%	±%
Labor	Vince Martin	35,850	60.9	+2.2
Liberal	Peter Kintominas	19,828	33.7	+0.7
Australia	Garry Bennett	3,203	5.4	+1.0
Total formal votes		58,881	98.4	−0.2
Informal votes		945	1.6	+0.2
Turnout		59,826	96.4	−0.2
Two-party-preferred result
Labor	Vince Martin		63.5	+1.6
Liberal	Peter Kintominas		36.5	−1.6
Labor hold		Swing	+1.6	

=== Barton ===
This section is an excerpt from Electoral results for the Division of Barton § 1974

1974 Australian federal election: Barton
Party	Candidate	Votes	%	±%
Labor	Len Reynolds	32,694	53.7	+0.9
Liberal	Jim Bradfield	26,771	44.0	+2.9
Australia	Charles Margetson	1,397	2.3	−1.7
Total formal votes		60,862	98.8	
Informal votes		711	1.2	
Turnout		61,573	96.1	
Two-party-preferred result
Labor	Len Reynolds		55.1	−0.7
Liberal	Jim Bradfield		44.9	+0.7
Labor hold		Swing	−0.7	

=== Bennelong ===
This section is an excerpt from Electoral results for the Division of Bennelong § 1974

1974 Australian federal election: Bennelong
Party	Candidate	Votes	%	±%
Liberal	John Howard	32,700	51.7	+5.7
Labor	Dick Hall	26,581	42.0	+3.8
Australia	Gillian Sutton	2,649	4.2	−6.3
Independent	John Anlezark	1,311	2.1	+2.1
Total formal votes		63,241	98.2	
Informal votes		1,132	1.8	
Turnout		64,373	95.0	
Two-party-preferred result
Liberal	John Howard		54.5	+2.1
Labor	Dick Hall		45.5	−2.1
Liberal hold		Swing	+2.1	

=== Berowra ===
This section is an excerpt from Electoral results for the Division of Berowra § 1974

1974 Australian federal election: Berowra
Party	Candidate	Votes	%	±%
Liberal	Harry Edwards	39,511	62.5	+9.0
Labor	George Williams	20,363	32.2	−2.2
Australia	Patricia Wallace	3,386	5.4	−3.0
Total formal votes		63,260	98.9	
Informal votes		686	1.1	
Turnout		63,946	95.5	
Two-party-preferred result
Liberal	Harry Edwards		64.7	+4.9
Labor	George Williams		35.3	−4.9
Liberal hold		Swing	+4.9	

=== Blaxland ===
This section is an excerpt from Electoral results for the Division of Blaxland § 1974

1974 Australian federal election: Blaxland
Party	Candidate	Votes	%	±%
Labor	Paul Keating	40,484	66.8	+0.1
Liberal	Wallace Smallwood	17,398	28.7	−0.9
Australia	Kenneth Higgs	2,689	4.4	+4.4
Total formal votes		60,571	97.9	
Informal votes		1,311	2.1	
Turnout		61,882	96.2	
Two-party-preferred result
Labor	Paul Keating		69.8	+2.4
Liberal	Wallace Smallwood		30.2	−2.4
Labor hold		Swing	+2.4	

=== Bradfield ===
This section is an excerpt from Electoral results for the Division of Bradfield § 1974

1974 Australian federal election: Bradfield
Party	Candidate	Votes	%	±%
Liberal	David Connolly	47,142	72.3	+11.0
Labor	Bruce Abrahams	15,391	23.6	+0.9
Australia	Colvin Johnston	2,660	4.1	−4.1
Total formal votes		65,193	99.1	
Informal votes		619	0.9	
Turnout		65,812	95.1	
Two-party-preferred result
Liberal	David Connolly		73.9	+4.6
Labor	Bruce Abrahams		26.1	−4.6
Liberal hold		Swing	+4.6	

=== Calare ===
This section is an excerpt from Electoral results for the Division of Calare § 1974

1974 Australian federal election: Calare
Party	Candidate	Votes	%	±%
Country	John England	27,817	55.5	+4.0
Labor	Neville Bowers	13,082	26.1	+26.1
Labor	Francis Hall	8,517	17.0	−26.2
Australia	Douglas Bray	682	1.4	+1.4
Total formal votes		50,098	98.5	
Informal votes		775	1.5	
Turnout		50,873	96.6	
Two-party-preferred result
Country	John England		57.8	+2.1
Labor	Neville Bowers		42.2	−2.1
Country hold		Swing	+2.1	

=== Chifley ===
This section is an excerpt from Electoral results for the Division of Chifley § 1974

1974 Australian federal election: Chifley
Party	Candidate	Votes	%	±%
Labor	John Armitage	52,400	70.8	−0.7
Liberal	Patricia Robinson	19,502	26.4	+3.4
Australia	Phillip Lambert	2,090	2.8	+2.8
Total formal votes		73,992	97.8	
Informal votes		1,640	2.2	
Turnout		75,632	96.9	
Two-party-preferred result
Labor	John Armitage		72.5	−0.1
Liberal	Patricia Robinson		27.5	+0.1
Labor hold		Swing	−0.1	

=== Cook ===
This section is an excerpt from Electoral results for the Division of Cook § 1974

1974 Australian federal election: Cook
Party	Candidate	Votes	%	±%
Liberal	Don Dobie	29,142	48.7	+3.2
Labor	Ray Thorburn	29,008	48.5	+2.0
Australia	Milo Dunphy	1,555	2.6	−1.5
Independent	Ronald Gallagher	167	0.3	+0.0
Total formal votes		59,872	99.0	
Informal votes		587	1.0	
Turnout		60,459	96.8	
Two-party-preferred result
Labor	Ray Thorburn	30,265	50.5	−0.2
Liberal	Don Dobie	29,607	49.5	+0.2
Labor hold		Swing	−0.2	

=== Cowper ===
This section is an excerpt from Electoral results for the Division of Cowper § 1974

1974 Australian federal election: Cowper
Party	Candidate	Votes	%	±%
Country	Ian Robinson	29,889	55.8	+6.4
Labor	Thomas Cronin	22,730	42.4	−2.4
Australia	James Davies	585	1.1	−1.9
Independent	Raymond Hardy	391	0.7	+0.7
Total formal votes		53,595	98.9	
Informal votes		620	1.1	
Turnout		54,215	96.2	
Two-party-preferred result
Country	Ian Robinson		56.6	+4.1
Labor	Thomas Cronin		43.4	−4.1
Country hold		Swing	−4.1	

=== Cunningham ===
This section is an excerpt from Electoral results for the Division of Cunningham § 1974

1974 Australian federal election: Cunningham
Party	Candidate	Votes	%	±%
Labor	Rex Connor	47,129	69.9	+5.5
Liberal	Warren Hough	18,242	27.1	+1.0
Australia	Susan Healy	2,067	3.1	−1.9
Total formal votes		67,438	98.3	
Informal votes		1,140	1.7	
Turnout		68,578	95.4	
Two-party-preferred result
Labor	Rex Connor		71.8	+2.7
Liberal	Warren Hough		28.2	−2.7
Labor hold		Swing	+2.7	

=== Darling ===
This section is an excerpt from Electoral results for the Division of Darling § 1974

1974 Australian federal election: Darling
Party	Candidate	Votes	%	±%
Labor	John FitzPatrick	26,188	59.6	−1.4
Country	Max Overton	10,750	24.5	+2.0
Liberal	William Thornton	5,143	11.7	+2.0
Australia	Peter Farry	1,871	4.3	+4.3
Total formal votes		43,952	97.9	
Informal votes		937	2.1	
Turnout		44,889	94.9	
Two-party-preferred result
Labor	John FitzPatrick		63.8	+0.7
Country	Max Overton		36.2	−0.7
Labor hold		Swing	+0.7	

=== Eden-Monaro ===
This section is an excerpt from Electoral results for the Division of Eden-Monaro § 1974

1974 Australian federal election: Eden-Monaro
Party	Candidate	Votes	%	±%
Labor	Bob Whan	27,816	48.8	+1.2
Country	Ron Brewer	17,144	30.1	+7.5
Liberal	Jonathan Bell	11,325	19.9	−4.2
Australia	Keith Hughes	711	1.2	−0.9
Total formal votes		56,996	98.6	
Informal votes		835	1.4	
Turnout		57,831	96.5	
Two-party-preferred result
Labor	Bob Whan	28,571	50.1	−0.4
Country	Ron Brewer	28,425	49.9	+0.4
Labor hold		Swing	−0.4	

=== Evans ===
This section is an excerpt from Electoral results for the Division of Evans § 1974

1974 Australian federal election: Evans
Party	Candidate	Votes	%	±%
Labor	Allan Mulder	29,502	52.9	+4.7
Liberal	John Abel	24,299	43.6	+3.2
Independent	John McGarity	991	1.8	+1.8
Australia	Paul Flottmann	977	1.8	−3.2
Total formal votes		55,769	97.6	
Informal votes		1,379	2.4	
Turnout		57,148	94.9	
Two-party-preferred result
Labor	Allan Mulder		54.9	+2.2
Liberal	John Abel		45.1	−2.2
Labor hold		Swing	+2.2	

=== Farrer ===
This section is an excerpt from Electoral results for the Division of Farrer § 1974

1974 Australian federal election: Farrer
Party	Candidate	Votes	%	±%
Liberal	David Fairbairn	32,125	55.8	+7.9
Labor	Kevin Esler	22,926	39.9	+1.6
Australia	Peter Benton	2,477	4.3	−2.4
Total formal votes		57,528	98.6	
Informal votes		795	1.4	
Turnout		58,323	95.7	
Two-party-preferred result
Liberal	David Fairbairn		57.1	+1.1
Labor	Kevin Esler		42.9	−1.1
Liberal hold		Swing	+1.1	

=== Grayndler ===
This section is an excerpt from Electoral results for the Division of Grayndler § 1974

1974 Australian federal election: Grayndler
Party	Candidate	Votes	%	±%
Labor	Fred Daly	35,255	72.2	−1.5
Liberal	Jonathan Fowler	11,064	22.7	+1.4
Australia	Gregory Berry	2,500	5.1	+5.1
Total formal votes		48,819	97.4	
Informal votes		1,303	2.6	
Turnout		50,122	93.5	
Two-party-preferred result
Labor	Fred Daly		75.7	+1.0
Liberal	Jonathan Fowler		24.3	−1.0
Labor hold		Swing	+1.0	

=== Gwydir ===
This section is an excerpt from Electoral results for the Division of Gwydir § 1974

1974 Australian federal election: Gwydir
Party	Candidate	Votes	%	±%
Country	Ralph Hunt	28,892	58.0	+7.8
Labor	Francis Bourke	20,249	40.6	−2.8
Australia	James Thompson	689	1.4	−1.0
Total formal votes		49,830	98.8	
Informal votes		602	1.2	
Turnout		50,432	96.1	
Two-party-preferred result
Country	Ralph Hunt		58.6	+4.4
Labor	Francis Bourke		41.4	−4.4
Country hold		Swing	+4.4	

=== Hughes ===
This section is an excerpt from Electoral results for the Division of Hughes § 1974

1974 Australian federal election: Hughes
Party	Candidate	Votes	%	±%
Labor	Les Johnson	40,005	66.3	−0.2
Liberal	Philip Benwell	18,954	31.4	+1.0
Australia	Walter Skarschewski	1,382	2.3	+2.3
Total formal votes		60,341	98.5	
Informal votes		894	1.5	
Turnout		61,235	95.1	
Two-party-preferred result
Labor	Les Johnson		67.7	+0.6
Liberal	Philip Benwell		32.3	−0.6
Labor hold		Swing	+0.6	

=== Hume ===
This section is an excerpt from Electoral results for the Division of Hume § 1974

1974 Australian federal election: Hume
Party	Candidate	Votes	%	±%
Labor	Frank Olley	22,640	47.4	−2.7
Country	Stephen Lusher	18,882	39.6	−5.2
Liberal	Graham Thompson	4,942	10.4	+10.4
Australia	John Gedye	1,253	2.6	+2.6
Total formal votes		47,717	98.4	
Informal votes		759	1.6	
Turnout		48,476	96.9	
Two-party-preferred result
Country	Stephen Lusher	24,185	50.7	+2.6
Labor	Frank Olley	23,532	49.3	−2.6
Country gain from Labor		Swing	+2.6	

=== Hunter ===
This section is an excerpt from Electoral results for the Division of Hunter § 1974

1974 Australian federal election: Hunter
Party	Candidate	Votes	%	±%
Labor	Bert James	44,987	72.6	−2.5
Liberal	Alex Bevan	15,442	24.9	+0.0
Australia	Des Kynaston	1,501	2.4	+2.4
Total formal votes		61,930	98.5	
Informal votes		954	1.5	
Turnout		62,884	97.1	
Two-party-preferred result
Labor	Bert James		74.0	−1.1
Liberal	Alex Bevan		26.0	+1.1
Labor hold		Swing	−1.1	

=== Kingsford Smith ===
This section is an excerpt from Electoral results for the Division of Kingsford Smith § 1974

1974 Australian federal election: Kingsford-Smith
Party	Candidate	Votes	%	±%
Labor	Lionel Bowen	39,432	67.8	+0.9
Liberal	Gary McCready	17,217	29.6	+2.1
Australia	Anthony Green	1,520	2.6	+2.6
Total formal votes		58,169	98.0	
Informal votes		1,191	2.0	
Turnout		59,360	94.1	
Two-party-preferred result
Labor	Lionel Bowen		69.4	+0.6
Liberal	Gary McCready		30.6	−0.6
Labor hold		Swing	+0.6	

=== Lang ===
This section is an excerpt from Electoral results for the Division of Lang § 1974

1974 Australian federal election: Lang
Party	Candidate	Votes	%	±%
Labor	Frank Stewart	37,343	64.7	+0.9
Liberal	Barry Peffer	17,795	30.8	−1.2
Australia	George Edgell	2,558	4.4	+4.4
Total formal votes		57,696	98.1	
Informal votes		1,136	1.9	
Turnout		58,832	92.8	
Two-party-preferred result
Labor	Frank Stewart		66.7	+2.3
Liberal	Barry Peffer		32.3	−2.3
Labor hold		Swing	+2.3	

=== Lowe ===
This section is an excerpt from Electoral results for the Division of Lowe § 1974

1974 Australian federal election: Lowe
Party	Candidate	Votes	%	±%
Liberal	William McMahon	29,110	51.5	+2.8
Labor	Doug Sutherland	24,697	43.7	+0.8
Independent	Bronte Douglas	1,578	2.8	+2.8
Australia	Bent Poulsen	1,088	1.9	−1.6
Total formal votes		56,473	97.8	
Informal votes		1,241	2.2	
Turnout		57,714	94.6	
Two-party-preferred result
Liberal	William McMahon		54.2	+1.2
Labor	Doug Sutherland		45.8	−1.2
Liberal hold		Swing	+1.2	

=== Lyne ===
This section is an excerpt from Electoral results for the Division of Lyne § 1974

1974 Australian federal election: Lyne
Party	Candidate	Votes	%	±%
Country	Philip Lucock	33,253	59.8	+8.8
Labor	Ken Reed	20,306	36.5	−6.2
Australia	David Haig	2,005	3.6	+1.1
Total formal votes		55,564	98.8	
Informal votes		655	1.2	
Turnout		56,219	96.7	
Two-party-preferred result
Country	Philip Lucock		61.8	+6.9
Labor	Ken Reed		38.2	−6.9
Country hold		Swing	+6.9	

=== Macarthur ===
This section is an excerpt from Electoral results for the Division of Macarthur § 1974

1974 Australian federal election: Macarthur
Party	Candidate	Votes	%	±%
Labor	John Kerin	39,306	53.2	+4.9
Liberal	David Wood	33,141	44.9	+16.0
Australia	Jill Kerr	1,442	2.0	+2.0
Total formal votes		73,889	98.9	
Informal votes		856	1.1	
Turnout		74,745	95.9	
Two-party-preferred result
Labor	John Kerin		54.4	+2.2
Liberal	David Wood		45.6	−2.2
Labor hold		Swing	+2.2	

=== Mackellar ===
This section is an excerpt from Electoral results for the Division of Mackellar § 1974

1974 Australian federal election: Mackellar
Party	Candidate	Votes	%	±%
Liberal	Bill Wentworth	36,697	55.2	+7.1
Labor	Evan Davies	26,772	40.3	+3.8
Australia	Noel Gash	2,987	4.5	−7.2
Total formal votes		66,456	98.6	
Informal votes		949	1.4	
Turnout		67,405	93.7	
Two-party-preferred result
Liberal	Bill Wentworth		57.0	+1.8
Labor	Evan Davies		43.0	−1.8
Liberal hold		Swing	+1.8	

=== Macquarie ===
This section is an excerpt from Electoral results for the Division of Macquarie § 1974

1974 Australian federal election: Macquarie
Party	Candidate	Votes	%	±%
Labor	Tony Luchetti	39,472	56.1	−2.7
Liberal	Malcolm Mackay	24,849	35.3	+9.9
Country	Michael Hunt	4,453	6.3	−4.3
Australia	Gregory Woodward	1,061	1.5	+1.5
Country	Steven Parrott	579	0.8	+0.8
Total formal votes		70,414	98.5	
Informal votes		1,084	1.5	
Turnout		71,498	95.8	
Two-party-preferred result
Labor	Tony Luchetti		58.7	−1.9
Liberal	Malcolm Mackay		41.3	+1.9
Labor hold		Swing	−1.9	

=== Mitchell ===
This section is an excerpt from Electoral results for the Division of Mitchell § 1974

1974 Australian federal election: Mitchell
Party	Candidate	Votes	%	±%
Liberal	Alan Cadman	39,009	50.4	+5.8
Labor	Alfred Ashley-Brown	36,283	46.9	−0.6
Australia	John Butterworth	2,080	2.7	−1.4
Total formal votes		77,372	98.6	
Informal votes		1,122	1.4	
Turnout		78,494	95.8	
Two-party-preferred result
Liberal	Alan Cadman		51.5	+2.7
Labor	Alfred Ashley-Brown		48.5	−2.7
Liberal gain from Labor		Swing	+2.7	

=== New England ===
This section is an excerpt from Electoral results for the Division of New England § 1974

1974 Australian federal election: New England
Party	Candidate	Votes	%	±%
Country	Ian Sinclair	32,874	57.0	+7.8
Labor	William Bischoff	23,197	40.2	−0.1
Australia	Brian Edwards	1,574	2.7	−3.3
Total formal votes		57,645	98.8	
Informal votes		672	1.2	
Turnout		58,317	95.6	
Two-party-preferred result
Country	Ian Sinclair		58.1	+3.2
Labor	William Bischoff		41.9	−3.2
Country hold		Swing	+3.2	

=== Newcastle ===
This section is an excerpt from Electoral results for the Division of Newcastle1974

1974 Australian federal election: Newcastle
Party	Candidate	Votes	%	±%
Labor	Charles Jones	38,554	70.0	+5.1
Liberal	Arthur Thomas	14,947	27.1	−1.4
Australia	Ellen Rose	1,590	2.9	+2.9
Total formal votes		55,091	98.4	
Informal votes		919	1.6	
Turnout		56,010	96.1	
Two-party-preferred result
Labor	Charles Jones		71.7	+3.7
Liberal	Arthur Thomas		28.3	−3.7
Labor hold		Swing	+3.7	

=== North Sydney ===
This section is an excerpt from Electoral results for the Division of North Sydney § 1974

1974 Australian federal election: North Sydney
Party	Candidate	Votes	%	±%
Liberal	Bill Graham	30,155	56.9	+6.3
Labor	Patrick Healy	19,883	37.5	+1.3
Australia	James Feros	2,609	4.9	−3.2
Independent	Romualds Kemps	326	0.6	+0.1
Total formal votes		52,973	97.8	
Informal votes		1,202	2.2	
Turnout		54,175	92.6	
Two-party-preferred result
Liberal	Bill Graham		58.9	+0.5
Labor	Patrick Healy		41.1	−0.5
Liberal hold		Swing	+0.5	

=== Parramatta ===
This section is an excerpt from Electoral results for the Division of Parramatta § 1974

1974 Australian federal election: Parramatta
Party	Candidate	Votes	%	±%
Liberal	Philip Ruddock	33,916	49.3	+3.3
Labor	Barry Wilde	32,246	46.8	+0.8
Australia	Robert MacKenzie	1,481	2.2	−1.3
Independent	Derek Barker	1,188	1.7	−0.1
Total formal votes		68,831	98.4	
Informal votes		1,101	1.6	
Turnout		69,932	96.0	
Two-party-preferred result
Liberal	Philip Ruddock	35,330	51.3	+1.0
Labor	Barry Wilde	33,501	48.7	−1.0
Liberal hold		Swing	+1.0	

=== Paterson ===
This section is an excerpt from Electoral results for the Division of Paterson § 1974

1974 Australian federal election: Paterson
Party	Candidate	Votes	%	±%
Country	Frank O'Keefe	26,418	49.3	+2.2
Labor	Noel Unicomb	26,261	49.0	+1.0
Australia	Robert Fowler	916	1.7	−0.4
Total formal votes		53,595	98.8	
Informal votes		658	1.2	
Turnout		54,253	95.9	
Two-party-preferred result
Country	Frank O'Keefe	26,935	50.3	−0.1
Labor	Noel Unicomb	26,660	49.7	+0.1
Country hold		Swing	−0.1	

=== Phillip ===
This section is an excerpt from Electoral results for the Division of Phillip § 1974

1974 Australian federal election: Phillip
Party	Candidate	Votes	%	±%
Labor	Joe Riordan	31,337	52.7	+2.7
Liberal	Jack Cunningham	26,198	44.1	+3.4
Australia	Virginia Walker	1,368	2.3	−1.7
Independent	David Taylor	550	0.9	+0.9
Total formal votes		59,453	97.6	
Informal votes		1,435	2.4	
Turnout		60,888	92.8	
Two-party-preferred result
Labor	Joe Riordan		54.5	+0.8
Liberal	Jack Cunningham		45.5	−0.8
Labor hold		Swing	+0.8	

=== Prospect ===
This section is an excerpt from Electoral results for the Division of Prospect § 1974

1974 Australian federal election: Prospect
Party	Candidate	Votes	%	±%
Labor	Dick Klugman	44,082	67.4	+2.5
Liberal	Donald MacDonald	19,591	30.0	+1.1
Australia	Geoffrey Thomas	1,693	2.6	+2.6
Total formal votes		65,366	97.7	
Informal votes		1,513	2.3	
Turnout		66,879	95.4	
Two-party-preferred result
Labor	Dick Klugman		69.0	+3.1
Liberal	Donald MacDonald		31.0	−3.1
Labor hold		Swing	+3.1	

=== Reid ===
This section is an excerpt from Electoral results for the Division of Reid § 1974

1974 Australian federal election: Reid
Party	Candidate	Votes	%	±%
Labor	Tom Uren	38,222	67.9	+1.4
Liberal	Thomas Faulkner	16,753	29.7	+0.2
Australia	Astrid O'Neill	1,349	2.4	+2.4
Total formal votes		56,324	97.8	
Informal votes		1,264	2.2	
Turnout		57,588	95.6	
Two-party-preferred result
Labor	Tom Uren		69.3	+2.0
Liberal	Thomas Faulkner		30.7	−2.0
Labor hold		Swing	+2.0	

=== Richmond ===
This section is an excerpt from Electoral results for the Division of Richmond § 1974

1974 Australian federal election: Richmond
Party	Candidate	Votes	%	±%
Country	Doug Anthony	35,090	62.2	+4.7
Labor	Frederick Braid	19,216	34.1	+1.7
Australia	Bernard Walrut	2,090	3.7	−6.5
Total formal votes		56,396	99.0	
Informal votes		589	1.0	
Turnout		56,985	95.9	
Two-party-preferred result
Country	Doug Anthony		63.7	+1.5
Labor	Frederick Braid		36.3	−1.5
Country hold		Swing	+1.5	

=== Riverina ===
This section is an excerpt from Electoral results for the Division of Riverina § 1974

1974 Australian federal election: Riverina
Party	Candidate	Votes	%	±%
Labor	Al Grassby	23,233	47.8	−6.9
Country	John Sullivan	16,128	33.2	−2.2
Liberal	Donald Mackay	8,868	18.3	+12.2
Australia	John Thomson	357	0.7	+0.7
Total formal votes		48,586	98.8	
Informal votes		572	1.2	
Turnout		49,158	94.7	
Two-party-preferred result
Country	John Sullivan	24,689	50.8	+7.7
Labor	Al Grassby	23,897	49.2	−7.7
Country gain from Labor		Swing	+7.7	

=== Robertson ===
This section is an excerpt from Electoral results for the Division of Robertson § 1974

1974 Australian federal election: Robertson
Party	Candidate	Votes	%	±%
Labor	Barry Cohen	42,936	57.6	−0.5
Liberal	Hugh Chalmers	29,637	39.7	+0.6
Australia	Jennifer Baker	2,011	2.7	+2.7
Total formal votes		74,584	98.7	
Informal votes		985	1.3	
Turnout		75,569	96.5	
Two-party-preferred result
Labor	Barry Cohen		58.6	−0.1
Liberal	Hugh Chalmers		41.4	+0.1
Labor hold		Swing	−0.1	

=== Shortland ===
This section is an excerpt from Electoral results for the Division of Shortland § 1974

1974 Australian federal election: Shortland
Party	Candidate	Votes	%	±%
Labor	Peter Morris	37,031	63.5	+7.6
Liberal	David Morris	17,756	30.4	+3.4
Independent	Lionel Lambkin	2,063	3.5	+3.5
Australia	John Steele	1,493	2.6	+2.6
Total formal votes		58,343	98.3	
Informal votes		997	1.7	
Turnout		59,340	96.6	
Two-party-preferred result
Labor	Peter Morris		66.3	+2.6
Liberal	David Morris		32.7	−2.6
Labor hold		Swing	+2.6	

=== St George ===
This section is an excerpt from Electoral results for the Division of St George § 1974

1974 Australian federal election: St George
Party	Candidate	Votes	%	±%
Labor	Bill Morrison	31,121	55.0	+2.0
Liberal	Brian Booth	24,696	43.6	+2.5
Australia	Harry Jagers	788	1.4	−0.8
Total formal votes		56,605	98.4	
Informal votes		931	1.6	
Turnout		57,536	95.7	
Two-party-preferred result
Labor	Bill Morrison		55.8	+0.8
Liberal	Brian Booth		44.2	−0.8
Labor hold		Swing	+0.8	

=== Sydney ===
This section is an excerpt from Electoral results for the Division of Sydney § 1974

1974 Australian federal election: Sydney
Party	Candidate	Votes	%	±%
Labor	Jim Cope	32,244	71.9	+1.6
Liberal	Janis Wallace	8,876	19.8	+5.1
Australia	Julia Bovard	2,598	5.8	−1.8
Socialist	Pat Clancy	1,132	2.5	+0.1
Total formal votes		44,850	96.3	
Informal votes		1,709	3.7	
Turnout		46,559	89.1	
Two-party-preferred result
Labor	Jim Cope		78.0	−2.7
Liberal	Janis Wallace		22.0	+2.7
Labor hold		Swing	−2.7	

=== Warringah ===
This section is an excerpt from Electoral results for the Division of Warringah § 1974

1974 Australian federal election: Warringah
Party	Candidate	Votes	%	±%
Liberal	Michael MacKellar	33,962	60.6	+6.0
Labor	Allan Hughes	19,775	35.3	+3.9
Australia	Allan Mann	1,891	3.4	−6.1
Independent	Eric Riches	198	0.4	+0.4
Independent	Edwin Mayne	186	0.3	+0.3
Total formal votes		56,012	98.5	
Informal votes		832	1.5	
Turnout		56,844	94.3	
Two-party-preferred result
Liberal	Michael MacKellar		62.3	−0.2
Labor	Allan Hughes		37.7	+0.2
Liberal hold		Swing	−0.2	

=== Wentworth ===
This section is an excerpt from Electoral results for the Division of Wentworth § 1974

1974 Australian federal election: Wentworth
Party	Candidate	Votes	%	±%
Liberal	Bob Ellicott	30,677	61.8	+8.6
Labor	Paul Hawcroft	16,665	33.6	−3.1
Australia	Julia Featherstone	2,274	4.6	−2.8
Total formal votes		49,616	98.3	
Informal votes		859	1.7	
Turnout		50,475	94.2	
Two-party-preferred result
Liberal	Bob Ellicott		63.6	+5.3
Labor	Paul Hawcroft		36.4	−5.3
Liberal hold		Swing	+5.3	

=== Werriwa ===
This section is an excerpt from Electoral results for the Division of Werriwa § 1974

1974 Australian federal election: Werriwa
Party	Candidate	Votes	%	±%
Labor	Gough Whitlam	46,844	69.0	+0.1
Liberal	Michael Darby	19,822	29.2	+1.1
Australia	Robert Tuckwell	360	0.5	+0.5
Independent	Margaret Tomkins	221	0.3	+0.3
Independent	Maurice Sharp	152	0.2	+0.2
Independent	Robert Demkiw	98	0.1	+0.1
Independent	Steve Dodd	97	0.1	+0.1
National Socialist	Ross May	82	0.1	+0.1
Independent	Ian Robertson	78	0.1	+0.1
Independent	Eileen Eason	73	0.1	+0.1
Independent	Leslie Shaw	42	0.1	+0.1
Independent	Veljko Prlja	35	0.1	+0.1
Total formal votes		67,904	97.5	
Informal votes		1,715	2.5	
Turnout		69,619	96.0	
Two-party-preferred result
Labor	Gough Whitlam		69.9	+0.0
Liberal	Michael Darby		30.1	+0.0
Labor hold		Swing	+0.0	

== Victoria ==
1974 Australian federal election (Victoria)
← 1972	18 May 1974	1975 →

All 34 Victorian seats in the House of Representatives 17 seats needed for a majority
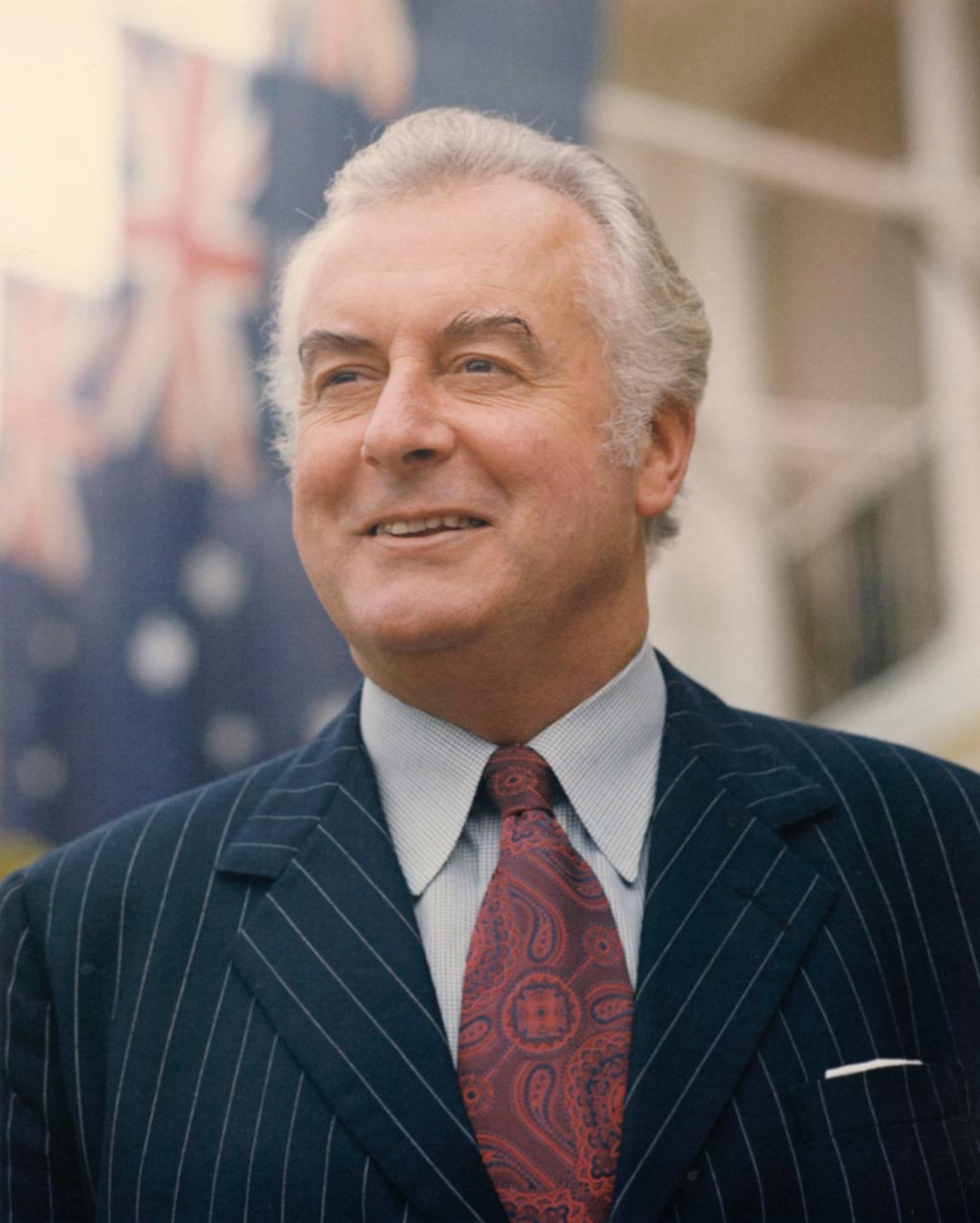

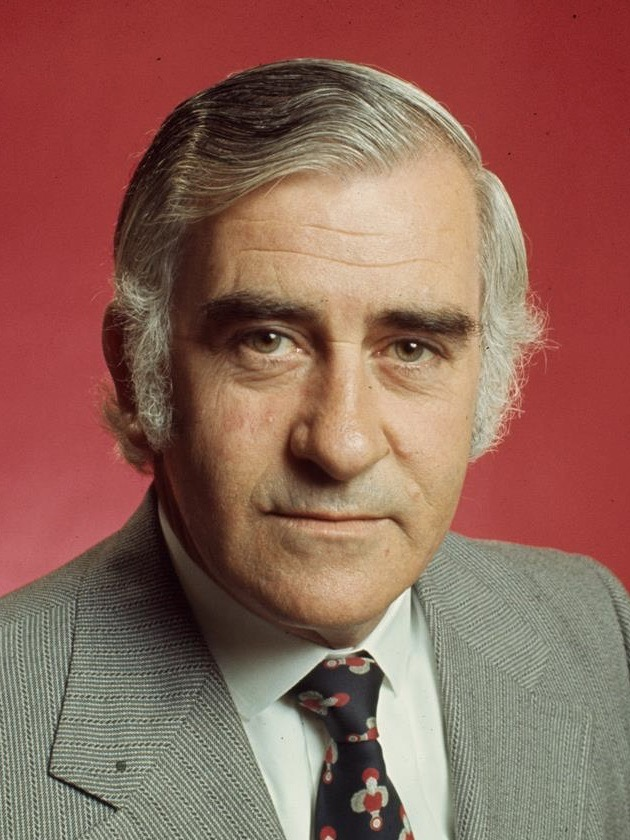
	First party	Second party
Leader	Gough Whitlam	Billy Snedden
Party	Labor	Coalition
Seats before	14	20
Seats won	16	18
Seat change	▲2	▼2
Popular vote	970,236	843,210
Percentage	47.9%	43.9%
Swing	▲0.6pp	▲2.9pp
TPP	50.6%	49.4%
TPP swing	▼0.2pp	▲0.2pp

=== Balaclava ===
This section is an excerpt from Electoral results for the Division of Balaclava § 1974

1974 Australian federal election: Balaclava
Party	Candidate	Votes	%	±%
Liberal	Ian Macphee	28,313	51.4	+4.8
Labor	Irene Dunsmuir	22,755	41.3	−3.2
Democratic Labor	Peter Lawlor	2,569	4.7	−2.6
Australia	Michael Muschamp	1,465	2.7	+2.7
Total formal votes		55,102	97.9	
Informal votes		1,186	2.1	
Turnout		56,288	95.2	
Two-party-preferred result
Liberal	Ian Macphee		56.7	+2.9
Labor	Irene Dunsmuir		43.3	−2.9
Liberal hold		Swing	+2.9	

=== Ballaarat ===
This section is an excerpt from Electoral results for the Division of Ballarat § 1974

1974 Australian federal election: Ballaarat
Party	Candidate	Votes	%	±%
Liberal	Dudley Erwin	25,736	45.9	+4.1
Labor	David Williams	24,517	43.7	−1.9
Democratic Labor	Bryan Hanrahan	4,225	7.5	−5.1
Australia	Pamela Clifford	1,574	2.8	+2.8
Total formal votes		56,052	98.1	
Informal votes		1,077	1.9	
Turnout		57,129	96.4	
Two-party-preferred result
Liberal	Dudley Erwin	30,721	54.8	+1.3
Labor	David Williams	25,331	45.2	−1.3
Liberal hold		Swing	+1.3	

=== Batman ===
This section is an excerpt from Electoral results for the Division of Batman § 1974

1974 Australian federal election: Batman
Party	Candidate	Votes	%	±%
Labor	Horrie Garrick	32,512	57.1	+1.2
Liberal	Keith Smith	17,953	31.5	−2.9
Democratic Labor	Kevin Barry	5,018	8.8	−1.0
Australia	Geoffrey Loftus-Hills	1,493	2.6	+2.6
Total formal votes		56,976	97.2	
Informal votes		1,629	2.8	
Turnout		58,605	94.7	
Two-party-preferred result
Labor	Horrie Garrick		60.4	+3.5
Liberal	Keith Smith		39.6	−3.5
Labor hold		Swing	+3.5	

=== Bendigo ===
This section is an excerpt from Electoral results for the Division of Bendigo § 1974

1974 Australian federal election: Bendigo
Party	Candidate	Votes	%	±%
Labor	David Kennedy	27,231	47.8	+0.1
Liberal	John Bourchier	22,014	38.6	+11.9
Independent	Joe Pearce	4,087	7.2	+7.2
Democratic Labor	Paul Brennan	3,032	5.3	−3.1
Australia	Robert Stenton	596	1.0	+1.0
Total formal votes		56,960	98.5	
Informal votes		868	1.5	
Turnout		57,828	96.9	
Two-party-preferred result
Liberal	John Bourchier	28,922	50.8	+0.6
Labor	David Kennedy	28,038	49.2	−0.6
Liberal hold		Swing	+0.6	

=== Bruce ===
This section is an excerpt from Electoral results for the Division of Bruce § 1974

1974 Australian federal election: Bruce
Party	Candidate	Votes	%	±%
Liberal	Billy Snedden	35,616	48.5	+4.2
Labor	Russell Oakley	31,780	43.3	+1.5
Democratic Labor	Rex Harper	3,270	4.5	−2.9
Australia	Iris Pederick	2,064	2.8	−3.7
Independent	John Ryan	421	0.6	+0.6
Independent	Diana Martin	196	0.3	+0.3
Independent	Glen Mann	129	0.2	+0.2
Total formal votes		73,476	98.4	
Informal votes		1,182	1.6	
Turnout		74,658	96.9	
Two-party-preferred result
Liberal	Billy Snedden	38,486	52.4	+0.2
Labor	Russell Oakley	34,990	47.6	−0.2
Liberal hold		Swing	+0.2	

=== Burke ===
This section is an excerpt from Electoral results for the Division of Burke (1969–2004) § 1974

1974 Australian federal election: Burke
Party	Candidate	Votes	%	±%
Labor	Keith Johnson	46,977	61.2	−2.4
Liberal	Claus Salger	21,411	27.9	+1.9
Democratic Labor	Colin Walsh	4,328	5.6	−4.9
Australia	Alexander Gerocs	4,017	5.2	+5.2
Total formal votes		76,733	97.0	
Informal votes		2,382	3.0	
Turnout		79,115	96.8	
Two-party-preferred result
Labor	Keith Johnson		65.8	+1.1
Liberal	Claus Salger		34.2	−1.1
Labor hold		Swing	+1.1	

=== Casey ===
This section is an excerpt from Electoral results for the Division of Casey § 1974

1974 Australian federal election: Casey
Party	Candidate	Votes	%	±%
Labor	Race Mathews	34,409	49.4	+2.5
Liberal	Peter Falconer	30,191	43.3	+4.4
Australia	Clive Champion	2,552	3.7	−0.1
Democratic Labor	John McKenna	2,411	3.5	−3.6
Republican	Joe Schillani	161	0.2	+0.2
Total formal votes		69,724	98.5	
Informal votes		1,055	1.5	
Turnout		70,779	95.5	
Two-party-preferred result
Labor	Race Mathews	35,884	51.5	−0.7
Liberal	Peter Falconer	33,840	48.5	+0.7
Labor hold		Swing	−0.7	

=== Chisholm ===
This section is an excerpt from Electoral results for the Division of Chisholm § 1974

1974 Australian federal election: Chisholm
Party	Candidate	Votes	%	±%
Liberal	Tony Staley	28,072	50.5	+3.7
Labor	Alastair Nicholson	22,651	40.7	+1.5
Democratic Labor	Joe Stanley	2,933	5.3	−2.3
Australia	Frank Penhalluriack	1,940	3.5	−2.9
Total formal votes		55,596	98.4	
Informal votes		920	1.6	
Turnout		56,516	95.4	
Two-party-preferred result
Liberal	Tony Staley		56.7	+1.3
Labor	Alastair Nicholson		43.3	−1.3
Liberal hold		Swing	+1.3	

=== Corangamite ===
This section is an excerpt from Electoral results for the Division of Corangamite § 1974

1974 Australian federal election: Corangamite
Party	Candidate	Votes	%	±%
Liberal	Tony Street	32,960	58.4	+5.0
Labor	Edwin Morris	19,280	34.2	−3.2
Democratic Labor	Francis O'Brien	3,076	5.4	−3.8
Australia	Ian Slater	1,126	2.0	+2.0
Total formal votes		56,442	98.6	
Informal votes		792	1.4	
Turnout		57,234	96.6	
Two-party-preferred result
Liberal	Tony Street		63.5	+1.8
Labor	Edwin Morris		36.5	−1.8
Liberal hold		Swing	+1.8	

=== Corio ===
This section is an excerpt from Electoral results for the Division of Corio § 1974

1974 Australian federal election: Corio
Party	Candidate	Votes	%	±%
Labor	Gordon Scholes	33,029	54.7	−1.9
Liberal	Gordon Hall	23,680	39.2	+4.8
Democratic Labor	John Timberlake	2,771	4.6	−4.4
Australia	Guenter Sahr	860	1.4	+1.4
Total formal votes		60,340	98.0	
Informal votes		1,231	2.0	
Turnout		61,571	95.2	
Two-party-preferred result
Labor	Gordon Scholes		56.0	−1.5
Liberal	Gordon Hall		44.0	+1.5
Labor hold		Swing	−1.5	

=== Deakin ===
This section is an excerpt from Electoral results for the Division of Deakin § 1974

1974 Australian federal election: Deakin
Party	Candidate	Votes	%	±%
Liberal	Alan Jarman	28,102	46.5	+4.6
Labor	Gavan Oakley	26,642	44.1	+0.2
Democratic Labor	Jim Brosnan	2,783	4.6	−2.2
Australia	Harold Jeffrey	1,627	2.7	−1.6
Independent	Bill French	967	1.6	+1.6
Independent	Stanley Lyden	279	0.5	+0.5
Total formal votes		60,400	98.4	
Informal votes		956	1.6	
Turnout		61,356	95.9	
Two-party-preferred result
Liberal	Alan Jarman	31,598	52.3	+1.6
Labor	Gavan Oakley	28,802	47.7	−1.6
Liberal hold		Swing	+1.6	

=== Diamond Valley ===
This section is an excerpt from Electoral results for the Division of Diamond Valley § 1974

1974 Australian federal election: Diamond Valley
Party	Candidate	Votes	%	±%
Labor	David McKenzie	38,519	47.1	+1.9
Liberal	Geoffrey Waite	36,683	44.8	+5.8
Democratic Labor	Christopher Curtis	4,249	5.2	−1.9
Australia	Harold Taskis	1,987	2.4	−3.9
Independent	Victor Gibson	394	0.5	+0.5
Total formal votes		81,832	98.6	
Informal votes		1,172	1.4	
Turnout		83,004	95.7	
Two-party-preferred result
Labor	David McKenzie	41,495	50.7	−0.9
Liberal	Geoffrey Waite	40,337	49.3	+0.9
Labor hold		Swing	−0.9	

=== Flinders ===
This section is an excerpt from Electoral results for the Division of Flinders § 1974

1974 Australian federal election: Flinders
Party	Candidate	Votes	%	±%
Liberal	Phillip Lynch	37,148	50.3	+1.8
Labor	Colin Bednall	33,630	45.5	+0.9
Democratic Labor	John Glynn	1,383	1.9	−2.0
Australia	David Heath	1,052	1.4	−1.5
Independent	Beatrice Faust	639	0.9	+0.9
Total formal votes		73,852	98.7	
Informal votes		952	1.3	
Turnout		74,804	95.5	
Two-party-preferred result
Liberal	Phillip Lynch		53.0	+0.1
Labor	Colin Bednall		47.0	−0.1
Liberal hold		Swing	+0.1	

=== Gellibrand ===
This section is an excerpt from Electoral results for the Division of Gellibrand § 1974

1974 Australian federal election: Gellibrand
Party	Candidate	Votes	%	±%
Labor	Ralph Willis	35,578	65.9	+1.5
Liberal	Cecile Storey	12,158	22.5	−3.1
Democratic Labor	Bert Bailey	5,009	9.3	−0.7
Australia	Veronica Schwarz	1,252	2.3	+2.3
Total formal votes		53,997	96.3	
Informal votes		2,054	3.7	
Turnout		56,051	95.7	
Two-party-preferred result
Labor	Ralph Willis		68.1	+2.7
Liberal	Cecile Storey		31.9	−2.7
Labor hold		Swing	+2.7	

=== Gippsland ===
This section is an excerpt from Electoral results for the Division of Gippsland § 1974

1974 Australian federal election: Gippsland
Party	Candidate	Votes	%	±%
Country	Peter Nixon	32,484	59.5	+6.4
Labor	Hugh Oakes	17,456	32.0	−1.9
Democratic Labor	John Condon	2,533	4.6	−3.3
Australia	John Bowron	2,123	3.9	−1.3
Total formal votes		54,596	98.4	
Informal votes		899	1.6	
Turnout		55,495	96.0	
Two-party-preferred result
Country	Peter Nixon		65.8	+2.9
Labor	Hugh Oakes		34.2	−2.9
Country hold		Swing	+2.9	

=== Henty ===
This section is an excerpt from Electoral results for the Division of Henty § 1974

1974 Australian federal election: Henty
Party	Candidate	Votes	%	±%
Labor	Joan Child	28,111	49.6	+3.2
Liberal	Max Fox	24,953	44.0	+1.6
Democratic Labor	Terry Farrell	2,408	4.2	−3.2
Australia	Michael Hughes	1,191	2.1	−1.8
Total formal votes		56,663	98.1	
Informal votes		1,093	1.9	
Turnout		57,756	95.3	
Two-party-preferred result
Labor	Joan Child		51.5	+1.8
Liberal	Max Fox		48.5	−1.8
Labor gain from Liberal		Swing	+1.8	

=== Higgins ===
This section is an excerpt from Electoral results for the Division of Higgins § 1974

1974 Australian federal election: Higgins
Party	Candidate	Votes	%	±%
Liberal	John Gorton	34,640	58.6	+5.2
Labor	Wilhelm Kapphan	20,614	34.9	−0.4
Democratic Labor	Thomas Magree	2,048	3.5	−2.2
Australia	Rafe Slaney	1,809	3.1	−2.5
Total formal votes		59,111	98.2	
Informal votes		1,079	1.8	
Turnout		60,190	94.8	
Two-party-preferred result
Liberal	John Gorton		63.0	+2.2
Labor	Wilhelm Kapphan		37.0	−2.2
Liberal hold		Swing	+2.2	

=== Holt ===
This section is an excerpt from Electoral results for the Division of Holt § 1974

1974 Australian federal election: Holt
Party	Candidate	Votes	%	±%
Labor	Max Oldmeadow	41,129	54.3	+2.8
Liberal	Len Reid	29,699	39.2	+0.6
Democratic Labor	Robert Fidler	2,546	3.4	−2.7
Australia	Joseph Busuttil	2,371	3.1	+1.2
Total formal votes		75,745	97.5	
Informal votes		1,961	2.5	
Turnout		77,706	96.7	
Two-party-preferred result
Labor	Max Oldmeadow		56.9	+2.5
Liberal	Len Reid		43.1	−2.5
Labor hold		Swing	+2.5	

=== Hotham ===
This section is an excerpt from Electoral results for the Division of Hotham § 1974

1974 Australian federal election: Hotham
Party	Candidate	Votes	%	±%
Liberal	Don Chipp	27,826	48.2	+0.1
Labor	Tony Ross	26,822	46.4	+4.9
Democratic Labor	Frank Gaffy	2,163	3.7	−4.3
Australia	Richard Franklin	801	1.4	+1.4
Republican	John Murray	177	0.3	−0.5
Total formal votes		57,789	98.1	
Informal votes		1,118	1.9	
Turnout		58,907	96.5	
Two-party-preferred result
Liberal	Don Chipp	30,235	52.3	−4.8
Labor	Tony Ross	27,554	47.7	+4.8
Liberal hold		Swing	−4.8	

=== Indi ===
This section is an excerpt from Electoral results for the Division of Indi § 1974

1974 Australian federal election: Indi
Party	Candidate	Votes	%	±%
Country	Mac Holten	29,150	56.3	+4.7
Labor	Alan Bell	18,886	36.5	+0.4
Democratic Labor	Christopher Cody	2,958	5.7	−4.1
Australia	Jim Dimo	796	1.5	+1.5
Total formal votes		51,790	98.2	
Informal votes		928	1.8	
Turnout		52,718	96.2	
Two-party-preferred result
Country	Mac Holten		62.2	+1.4
Labor	Alan Bell		37.8	−1.4
Country hold		Swing	+1.4	

=== Isaacs ===
This section is an excerpt from Electoral results for the Division of Isaacs § 1974

1974 Australian federal election: Isaacs
Party	Candidate	Votes	%	±%
Labor	Gareth Clayton	26,225	46.1	+0.3
Liberal	David Hamer	25,267	44.4	+2.0
Democratic Labor	William Leech	2,179	3.8	−3.2
Australia	Elizabeth Chesterfield	1,443	2.5	−2.3
Independent	James Bernard	1,181	2.1	+2.1
Independent	Janus Fawke	597	1.0	+1.0
Total formal votes		56,892	98.2	
Informal votes		1,062	1.8	
Turnout		57,954	95.6	
Two-party-preferred result
Labor	Gareth Clayton		50.6	+1.7
Liberal	David Hamer		49.4	−1.7
Labor gain from Liberal		Swing	+1.7	

=== Kooyong ===
This section is an excerpt from Electoral results for the Division of Kooyong § 1974

1974 Australian federal election: Kooyong
Party	Candidate	Votes	%	±%
Liberal	Andrew Peacock	32,086	54.9	+5.3
Labor	Wellington Lee	19,986	34.2	−0.6
Democratic Labor	Francis Duffy	3,334	5.7	−2.5
Australia	Frances Vorrath	1,779	3.0	−2.9
Independent	Ian Channell	1,311	2.2	+0.7
Total formal votes		58,496	98.4	
Informal votes		980	1.6	
Turnout		59,476	94.4	
Two-party-preferred result
Liberal	Andrew Peacock		62.8	+3.8
Labor	Wellington Lee		37.2	−3.8
Liberal hold		Swing	+3.8	

=== La Trobe ===
This section is an excerpt from Electoral results for the Division of La Trobe § 1974

1974 Australian federal election: La Trobe
Party	Candidate	Votes	%	±%
Labor	Tony Lamb	40,444	52.9	+2.4
Liberal	Marshall Baillieu	32,126	42.0	+4.1
Democratic Labor	Daniel Mason	2,051	2.7	−2.5
Australia	Don Walters	1,501	2.0	−1.3
Independent	William Bryant	323	0.4	+0.4
Total formal votes		76,445	98.1	
Informal votes		1,467	1.9	
Turnout		77,912	95.0	
Two-party-preferred result
Labor	Tony Lamb		54.6	−0.4
Liberal	Marshall Baillieu		45.4	+0.4
Labor hold		Swing	−0.4	

=== Lalor ===
This section is an excerpt from Electoral results for the Division of Lalor § 1974

1974 Australian federal election: Lalor
Party	Candidate	Votes	%	±%
Labor	Jim Cairns	44,005	64.6	+2.1
Liberal	Francis Purcell	17,613	25.8	+0.9
Democratic Labor	John Bacon	5,398	7.9	−3.8
Australia	William Inglis	1,128	1.7	+1.7
Total formal votes		68,144	96.7	
Informal votes		2,338	3.3	
Turnout		70,482	96.4	
Two-party-preferred result
Labor	Jim Cairns		67.3	+2.3
Liberal	Francis Purcell		32.7	−2.3
Labor hold		Swing	+2.3	

=== Mallee ===
This section is an excerpt from Electoral results for the Division of Mallee § 1974

1974 Australian federal election: Mallee
Party	Candidate	Votes	%	±%
Country	Peter Fisher	29,642	63.1	+7.8
Labor	Brian Smith	12,740	27.1	−6.3
Democratic Labor	Stanley Croughan	3,560	7.6	−3.7
Australia	John Grigg	1,035	2.2	+2.2
Total formal votes		46,977	98.0	
Informal votes		976	2.0	
Turnout		47,953	96.9	
Two-party-preferred result
Country	Peter Fisher		70.9	+6.3
Labor	Brian Smith		29.1	−6.3
Country hold		Swing	+6.3	

=== Maribyrnong ===
This section is an excerpt from Electoral results for the Division of Maribyrnong § 1974

1974 Australian federal election: Maribyrnong
Party	Candidate	Votes	%	±%
Labor	Moss Cass	33,393	56.7	+6.8
Liberal	Rex Webb	19,306	32.8	−0.3
Democratic Labor	Paul McManus	5,136	8.7	−3.2
Australia	John Watson	1,094	1.9	−0.8
Total formal votes		58,929	97.4	
Informal votes		1,587	2.6	
Turnout		60,516	96.9	
Two-party-preferred result
Labor	Moss Cass		58.7	+4.5
Liberal	Rex Webb		41.3	−4.5
Labor hold		Swing	+4.5	

=== McMillan ===
This section is an excerpt from Electoral results for the Division of McMillan § 1974

1974 Australian federal election: McMillan
Party	Candidate	Votes	%	±%
Labor	Barry Murphy	24,201	43.9	−1.9
Country	Arthur Hewson	13,650	24.8	+8.2
Liberal	Ronald Dent	13,345	24.2	+0.1
Democratic Labor	Les Hilton	2,273	4.1	−3.1
Australia	Ronald Broadhurst	1,666	3.0	+3.0
Total formal votes		55,135	97.9	
Informal votes		1,177	2.1	
Turnout		56,312	96.3	
Two-party-preferred result
Country	Arthur Hewson	30,110	54.6	+2.2
Labor	Barry Murphy	25,025	45.4	−2.2
Country hold		Swing	+2.2	

=== Melbourne ===
This section is an excerpt from Electoral results for the Division of Melbourne § 1974

1974 Australian federal election: Melbourne
Party	Candidate	Votes	%	±%
Labor	Ted Innes	35,257	68.9	+9.2
Liberal	Haset Sali	10,827	21.2	−2.5
Democratic Labor	Anna Linard	2,698	5.3	−3.7
Australia	Martin Kerr	1,768	3.5	−1.7
Independent	Philip Scott	593	1.2	+1.2
Total formal votes		51,143	96.5	
Informal votes		1,839	3.5	
Turnout		52,982	93.9	
Two-party-preferred result
Labor	Ted Innes		72.1	+6.6
Liberal	Haset Sali		27.9	−6.6
Labor hold		Swing	+6.6	

=== Melbourne Ports ===
This section is an excerpt from Electoral results for the Division of Melbourne Ports § 1974

1974 Australian federal election: Melbourne Ports
Party	Candidate	Votes	%	±%
Labor	Frank Crean	31,120	60.4	−1.1
Liberal	John Walsh	15,733	30.6	+0.1
Australia	Beverley Broadbent	2,429	4.7	+4.7
Democratic Labor	John Johnston	2,211	4.3	−3.7
Total formal votes		51,493	97.1	
Informal votes		1,556	2.9	
Turnout		53,049	92.3	
Two-party-preferred result
Labor	Frank Crean		64.1	+1.8
Liberal	John Walsh		35.9	−1.8
Labor hold		Swing	+1.8	

=== Murray ===
This section is an excerpt from Electoral results for the Division of Murray § 1974

1974 Australian federal election: Murray
Party	Candidate	Votes	%	±%
Country	Bruce Lloyd	28,475	53.0	+6.9
Labor	Dennis Dodd	14,503	27.0	−3.6
Liberal	Bill Hunter	7,324	13.6	−2.3
Democratic Labor	Patrick Payne	2,460	4.6	−2.7
Australia	Peter Schoeffel	680	1.3	+1.3
Independent	Hugh Dunn	242	0.5	+0.5
Total formal votes		53,684	97.6	
Informal votes		1,299	2.4	
Turnout		54,983	96.1	
Two-party-preferred result
Country	Bruce Lloyd		70.2	+2.8
Labor	Dennis Dodd		29.8	−2.8
Country hold		Swing	+2.8	

=== Scullin ===
This section is an excerpt from Electoral results for the Division of Scullin § 1974

1974 Australian federal election: Scullin
Party	Candidate	Votes	%	±%
Labor	Harry Jenkins	36,642	66.5	+4.8
Liberal	Alan Stanley	14,223	25.8	−0.4
Democratic Labor	Bernard McGrath	3,296	6.0	−6.1
Australia	John Kotre	950	1.7	+1.7
Total formal votes		55,111	97.0	
Informal votes		1,685	3.0	
Turnout		56,796	96.1	
Two-party-preferred result
Labor	Harry Jenkins		68.1	+4.3
Liberal	Alan Stanley		21.9	−4.3
Labor hold		Swing	+4.3	

=== Wannon ===
This section is an excerpt from Electoral results for the Division of Wannon § 1974

1974 Australian federal election: Wannon
Party	Candidate	Votes	%	±%
Liberal	Malcolm Fraser	28,117	54.8	+8.7
Labor	Ted Garth	19,133	37.3	−3.7
Democratic Labor	John Casanova	3,431	6.7	−1.3
Australia	Peter Hopgood	581	1.1	+1.1
Total formal votes		51,262	98.9	
Informal votes		582	1.1	
Turnout		51,844	97.2	
Two-party-preferred result
Liberal	Malcolm Fraser		61.4	+5.4
Labor	Ted Garth		38.6	−5.4
Liberal hold		Swing	+5.4	

=== Wills ===
This section is an excerpt from Electoral results for the Division of Wills § 1974

1974 Australian federal election: Wills
Party	Candidate	Votes	%	±%
Labor	Gordon Bryant	32,721	61.3	+0.6
Liberal	John Bales	15,923	29.8	+1.8
Democratic Labor	John Flint	3,430	6.4	−4.9
Australia	Stanley Bell	944	1.8	+1.8
Republican	Bruce Drinkwater	385	0.7	+0.7
Total formal votes		53,403	96.8	
Informal votes		1,793	3.2	
Turnout		55,196	95.8	
Two-party-preferred result
Labor	Gordon Bryant		63.4	+1.6
Liberal	John Bales		36.6	−1.6
Labor hold		Swing	+1.6	

=== Wimmera ===
This section is an excerpt from Electoral results for the Division of Wimmera § 1974

1974 Australian federal election: Wimmera
Party	Candidate	Votes	%	±%
Country	Robert King	18,306	39.0	−8.0
Labor	Brian Brooke	17,338	36.9	−5.2
Liberal	Heather Mitchell	9,191	19.6	+19.6
Democratic Labor	Kevin Dunn	1,804	3.8	−3.3
Australia	Keith Sullivan	331	0.7	+0.7
Total formal votes		46,970	98.4	
Informal votes		758	1.6	
Turnout		47,728	96.9	
Two-party-preferred result
Country	Robert King	28,939	61.6	+6.0
Labor	Brian Brooke	18,031	38.4	−6.0
Country hold		Swing	+6.0	

== Queensland ==
1974 Australian federal election (Queensland)
← 1972	18 May 1974	1975 →

All 18 Queensland seats in the House of Representatives 9 seats needed for a majority
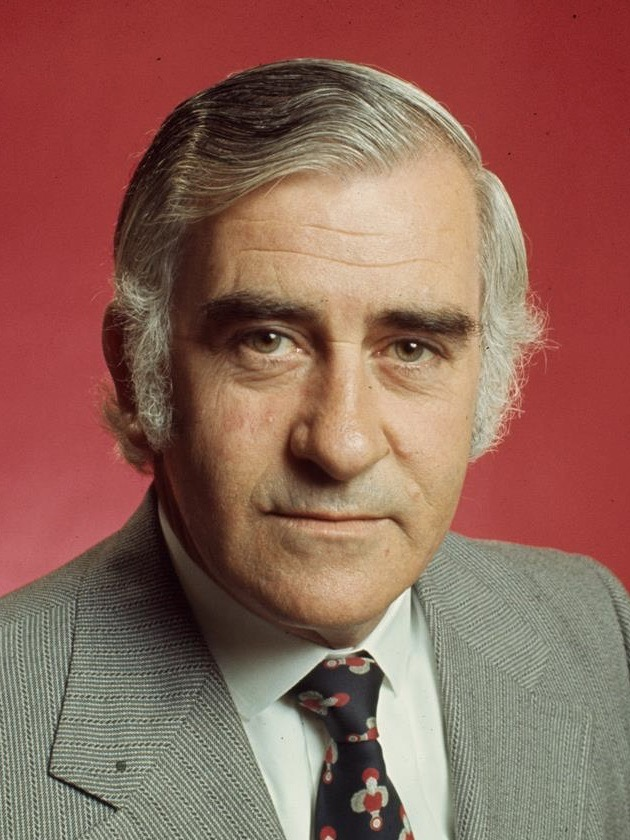

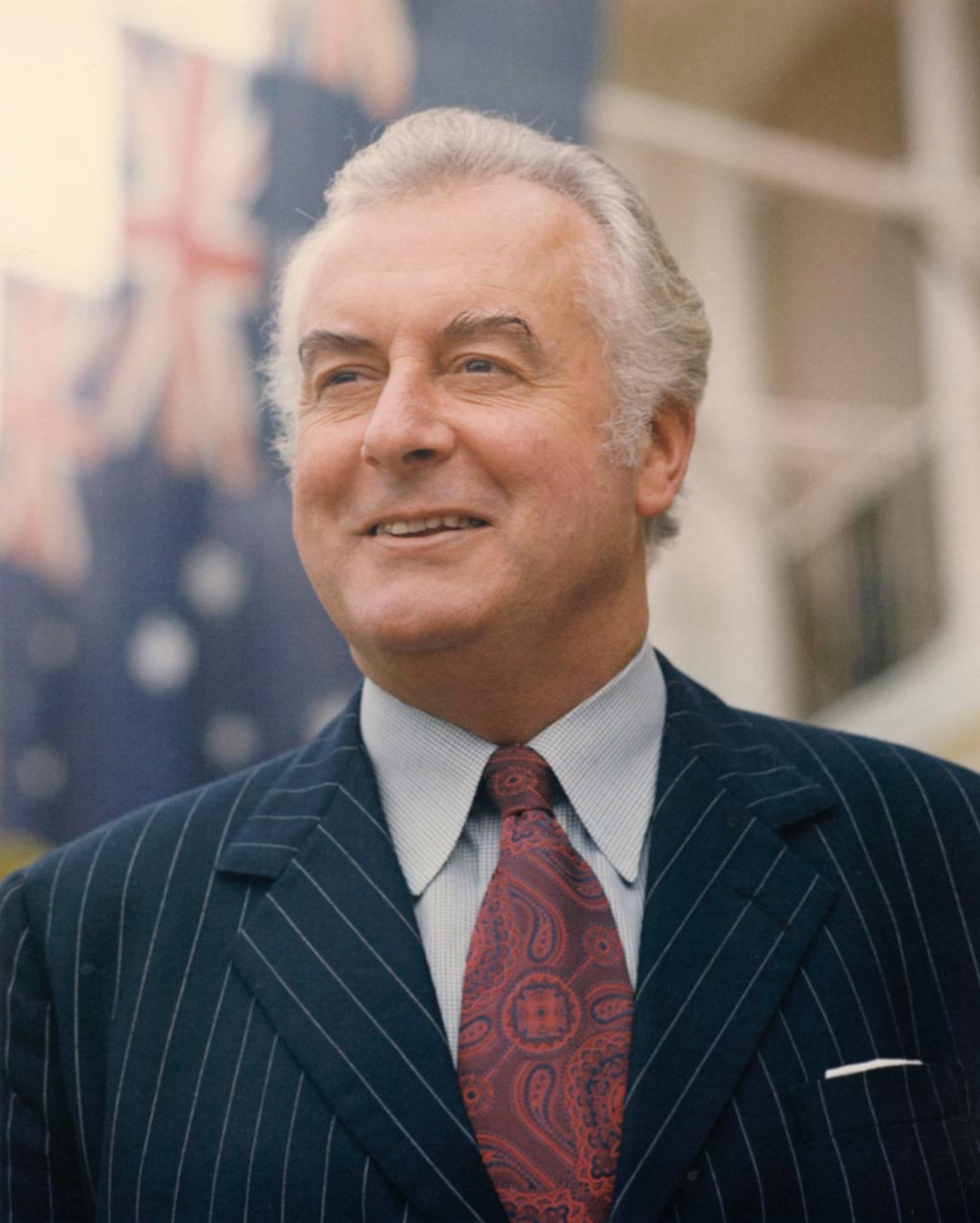
	First party	Second party
Leader	Billy Snedden	Gough Whitlam
Party	Coalition	Labor
Seats before	10	8
Seats won	12	6
Seat change	▲2	▼2
Popular vote	586,024	476,710
Percentage	54.1%	44.0%
Swing	▲9.0pp	▼3.2pp
TPP	54.6%	45.4%
TPP swing	▲4.1pp	▼4.1pp

=== Bowman ===
This section is an excerpt from Electoral results for the Division of Bowman § 1974

1974 Australian federal election: Bowman
Party	Candidate	Votes	%	±%
Labor	Len Keogh	36,947	49.8	−5.4
Liberal	David Jull	30,382	41.0	+1.7
Country	Gerry Langevad	5,998	8.1	+8.1
Australia	Winifred Sharkey	797	1.1	+1.1
Total formal votes		74,124	98.6	
Informal votes		1,086	1.4	
Turnout		75,210	95.1	
Two-party-preferred result
Labor	Len Keogh		51.3	−5.0
Liberal	David Jull		48.7	+5.0
Labor hold		Swing	−5.0	

=== Brisbane ===
This section is an excerpt from Electoral results for the Division of Brisbane § 1974

1974 Australian federal election: Brisbane
Party	Candidate	Votes	%	±%
Labor	Manfred Cross	27,093	49.2	−0.2
Liberal	Jim Anderson	22,477	40.8	+11.3
Country	Bill Siller	4,600	8.4	−3.6
Australia	Jeffrey Malyon	900	1.6	+1.6
Total formal votes		55,070	97.8	
Informal votes		1,252	2.2	
Turnout		56,322	93.4	
Two-party-preferred result
Labor	Manfred Cross		51.1	−0.7
Liberal	Jim Anderson		48.9	+0.7
Labor hold		Swing	−0.7	

=== Capricornia ===
This section is an excerpt from Electoral results for the Division of Capricornia § 1974

1974 Australian federal election: Capricornia
Party	Candidate	Votes	%	±%
Labor	Doug Everingham	27,951	52.3	−3.5
Country	Kevin Connor	13,713	25.6	+2.2
Liberal	Noel Kenny	11,254	21.0	+6.0
Independent	Therese Warner	556	1.0	+1.0
Total formal votes		53,474	98.9	
Informal votes		590	1.1	
Turnout		54,064	95.3	
Two-party-preferred result
Labor	Doug Everingham		54.9	−3.3
Country	Kevin Connor		45.1	+3.3
Labor hold		Swing	−3.3	

=== Darling Downs ===
This section is an excerpt from Electoral results for the Division of Darling Downs § 1974

1974 Australian federal election: Darling Downs
Party	Candidate	Votes	%	±%
Country	Tom McVeigh	38,078	64.9	+32.6
Labor	Ronald Madden	19,860	33.8	−2.5
Australia	William Nobes	733	1.2	+1.2
Total formal votes		58,671	99.1	
Informal votes		556	0.9	
Turnout		59,227	95.7	
Two-party-preferred result
Country	Tom McVeigh		65.4	+6.6
Labor	Ronald Madden		34.6	−6.6
Country hold		Swing	+6.6	

=== Dawson ===
This section is an excerpt from Electoral results for the Division of Dawson § 1974

1974 Australian federal election: Dawson
Party	Candidate	Votes	%	±%
Labor	Rex Patterson	28,029	50.6	−7.1
Country	Ray Braithwaite	27,363	49.4	+12.5
Total formal votes		55,392	99.0	
Informal votes		581	1.0	
Turnout		55,973	95.5	
Labor hold		Swing	−8.2	

=== Fisher ===
This section is an excerpt from Electoral results for the Division of Fisher § 1974

1974 Australian federal election: Fisher
Party	Candidate	Votes	%	±%
Country	Evan Adermann	44,968	68.7	+18.6
Labor	Hamish Linacre	20,472	31.3	−4.4
Total formal votes		65,440	98.6	
Informal votes		923	1.4	
Turnout		66,363	96.4	
Country hold		Swing	+6.3	

=== Griffith ===
This section is an excerpt from Electoral results for the Division of Griffith § 1974

1974 Australian federal election: Griffith
Party	Candidate	Votes	%	±%
Liberal	Don Cameron	27,381	49.0	+5.6
Labor	Clem Jones	26,657	47.7	+0.8
Independent	Cecil Birchley	1,185	2.1	+2.1
Australia	Beth Smith	609	1.1	−1.9
Total formal votes		55,832	98.4	
Informal votes		901	1.6	
Turnout		56,733	94.8	
Two-party-preferred result
Liberal	Don Cameron	28,690	51.4	+1.1
Labor	Clem Jones	27,142	48.6	−1.1
Liberal hold		Swing	+1.1	

=== Herbert ===
This section is an excerpt from Electoral results for the Division of Herbert § 1974

1974 Australian federal election: Herbert
Party	Candidate	Votes	%	±%
Liberal	Robert Bonnett	30,908	53.1	+8.3
Labor	John Rockett	25,712	44.2	+0.9
Australia	Leonard Weber	1,601	2.7	+0.1
Total formal votes		58,221	98.7	
Informal votes		783	1.3	
Turnout		59,004	93.7	
Two-party-preferred result
Liberal	Robert Bonnett		54.2	+0.4
Labor	John Rockett		45.8	−0.4
Liberal hold		Swing	+0.4	

=== Kennedy ===
This section is an excerpt from Electoral results for the Division of Kennedy § 1974

1974 Australian federal election: Kennedy
Party	Candidate	Votes	%	±%
Country	Bob Katter, Sr.	29,093	62.6	+5.0
Labor	Tony McGrady	17,363	37.4	−1.7
Total formal votes		46,456	98.5	
Informal votes		703	1.5	
Turnout		47,159	93.9	
Country hold		Swing	+2.4	

=== Leichhardt ===
This section is an excerpt from Electoral results for the Division of Leichhardt § 1974

1974 Australian federal election: Leichhardt
Party	Candidate	Votes	%	±%
Labor	Bill Fulton	25,702	49.6	−8.3
Country	Herbert Marsh	23,072	44.5	+11.7
Australia	Robert Ellwood	3,049	5.9	+1.8
Total formal votes		51,823	97.8	
Informal votes		1,184	2.2	
Turnout		53,007	94.1	
Two-party-preferred result
Labor	Bill Fulton	27,609	53.3	−8.1
Country	Herbert Marsh	24,214	46.7	+8.1
Labor hold		Swing	−8.1	

=== Lilley ===
This section is an excerpt from Electoral results for the Division of Lilley § 1974

1974 Australian federal election: Lilley
Party	Candidate	Votes	%	±%
Labor	Frank Doyle	27,974	47.5	+0.3
Liberal	Kevin Cairns	26,442	44.9	+0.9
Country	Albert Postle	3,786	6.4	+6.4
Australia	James Webb	713	1.2	−1.6
Total formal votes		58,915	98.4	
Informal votes		939	1.6	
Turnout		59,854	93.6	
Two-party-preferred result
Liberal	Kevin Cairns	30,074	51.0	+1.0
Labor	Frank Doyle	28,841	49.0	−1.0
Liberal gain from Labor		Swing	+1.0	

=== Maranoa ===
This section is an excerpt from Electoral results for the Division of Maranoa § 1974

1974 Australian federal election: Maranoa
Party	Candidate	Votes	%	±%
Country	James Corbett	30,104	68.7	+12.1
Labor	Janice Saltau	13,721	31.3	−4.9
Total formal votes		43,825	98.8	
Informal votes		535	1.2	
Turnout		44,360	95.1	
Country hold		Swing	+6.7	

=== McPherson ===
This section is an excerpt from Electoral results for the Division of McPherson § 1974

1974 Australian federal election: McPherson
Party	Candidate	Votes	%	±%
Liberal	Eric Robinson	47,496	56.6	+30.2
Labor	Tom Veivers	33,001	39.3	−1.5
Australia	Robert Richardson	3,427	4.1	+1.1
Total formal votes		83,924	98.8	
Informal votes		1,046	1.2	
Turnout		84,970	95.3	
Two-party-preferred result
Liberal	Eric Robinson		58.8	+4.1
Labor	Tom Veivers		41.2	−4.1
Liberal hold		Swing	+4.1	

=== Moreton ===
This section is an excerpt from Electoral results for the Division of Moreton § 1974

1974 Australian federal election: Moreton
Party	Candidate	Votes	%	±%
Liberal	James Killen	31,442	55.5	+7.6
Labor	William Forgan-Smith	23,999	42.4	−0.4
Australia	Robert McClintock	1,208	2.1	−0.8
Total formal votes		56,649	98.8	
Informal votes		669	1.2	
Turnout		57,318	95.1	
Two-party-preferred result
Liberal	James Killen		56.3	+1.8
Labor	William Forgan-Smith		45.7	−1.8
Liberal hold		Swing	+1.8	

=== Oxley ===
This section is an excerpt from Electoral results for the Division of Oxley § 1974

1974 Australian federal election: Oxley
Party	Candidate	Votes	%	±%
Labor	Bill Hayden	39,323	57.0	−8.8
Liberal	Allan Whybird	28,152	40.8	+10.5
Australia	Arthur Smith	1,489	2.2	+2.2
Total formal votes		68,964	98.5	
Informal votes		1,039	1.5	
Turnout		70,003	95.8	
Two-party-preferred result
Labor	Bill Hayden		58.3	−8.3
Liberal	Allan Whybird		41.7	+8.3
Labor hold		Swing	−8.3	

=== Petrie ===
This section is an excerpt from Electoral results for the Division of Petrie § 1974

1974 Australian federal election: Petrie
Party	Candidate	Votes	%	±%
Labor	Denis Murphy	30,651	43.0	−2.2
Liberal	John Hodges	29,442	41.3	+5.5
Country	Peter Addison	10,009	14.0	+3.8
Australia	Jill Ritchie	1,202	1.7	−1.8
Total formal votes		71,304	98.5	
Informal votes		1,063	1.5	
Turnout		72,367	95.5	
Two-party-preferred result
Liberal	John Hodges	39,183	55.0	+3.7
Labor	Denis Murphy	32,121	45.0	−3.7
Liberal hold		Swing	+3.7	

=== Ryan ===
This section is an excerpt from Electoral results for the Division of Ryan § 1974

1974 Australian federal election: Ryan
Party	Candidate	Votes	%	±%
Liberal	Nigel Drury	39,069	57.2	+11.0
Labor	James Herlihy	26,128	38.3	−2.0
Australia	Ruth Chenoweth	3,080	4.5	−1.9
Total formal votes		68,277	98.9	
Informal votes		760	1.1	
Turnout		69,037	95.9	
Two-party-preferred result
Liberal	Nigel Drury		59.6	+5.7
Labor	James Herlihy		40.4	−5.7
Liberal hold		Swing	+5.7	

=== Wide Bay ===
This section is an excerpt from Electoral results for the Division of Wide Bay § 1974

1974 Australian federal election: Wide Bay
Party	Candidate	Votes	%	±%
Labor	Brendan Hansen	26,127	45.9	−6.3
Country	Clarrie Millar	24,875	43.7	+1.8
Liberal	Ian Theodore	5,920	10.4	+10.4
Total formal votes		56,922	99.1	
Informal votes		508	0.9	
Turnout		57,430	97.2	
Two-party-preferred result
Country	Clarrie Millar	30,463	53.5	+6.8
Labor	Brendan Hansen	26,459	46.5	−6.8
Country gain from Labor		Swing	+6.8	

== South Australia ==
1974 Australian federal election (South Australia)
← 1972	18 May 1974	1975 →

All 12 SA seats in the House of Representatives 6 seats needed for a majority
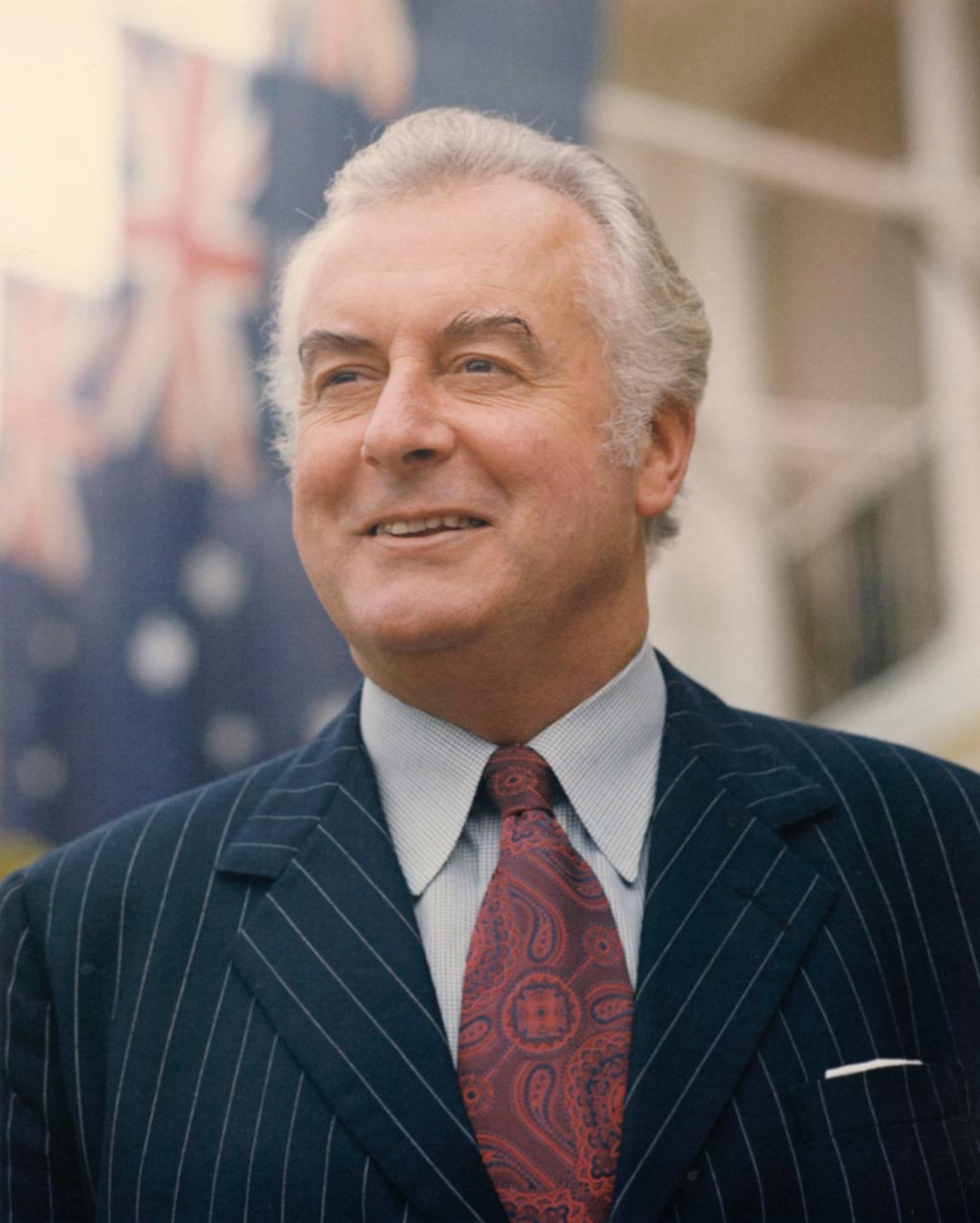

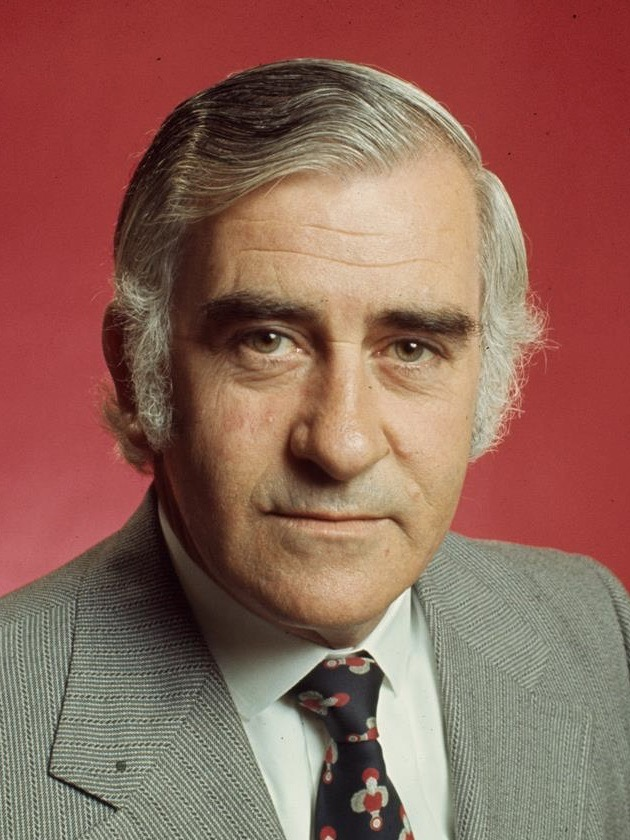
	First party	Second party
Leader	Gough Whitlam	Billy Snedden
Party	Labor	Coalition
Seats before	7	5
Seats won	7	5
Seat change	Steady	Steady
Popular vote	341,563	285,807
Percentage	48.7%	40.7%
Swing	▼1.9pp	▼2.9pp
TPP	52.5%	47.5%
TPP swing	▼0.2pp	▲0.2pp

=== Adelaide ===
This section is an excerpt from Electoral results for the Division of Adelaide § 1974

1974 Australian federal election: Adelaide
Party	Candidate	Votes	%	±%
Labor	Chris Hurford	31,572	55.8	+0.0
Liberal	Harold Steele	18,911	33.4	−5.8
Liberal Movement	Ray Buttery	5,005	8.9	+8.9
Australia	John Davies	1,061	1.9	+1.9
Total formal votes		56,549	96.8	
Informal votes		1,866	3.2	
Turnout		58,415	95.6	
Two-party-preferred result
Labor	Chris Hurford		59.1	+1.2
Liberal	Harold Steele		40.9	−1.2
Labor hold		Swing	+1.2	

=== Angas ===
This section is an excerpt from Electoral results for the Division of Angas (1949–1977) § 1949

1974 Australian federal election: Angas
Party	Candidate	Votes	%	±%
Liberal	Geoffrey Giles	27,704	53.1	+6.0
Labor	Adolf Thiel	15,579	29.9	−3.0
Country	Sam Pfeiffer	6,011	11.5	−4.5
Liberal Movement	Henry Nicholls	1,918	3.7	+3.7
Australia	Kate Hannaford	965	1.8	+1.8
Total formal votes		52,177	97.2	
Informal votes		1,485	2.8	
Turnout		53,662	96.7	
Two-party-preferred result
Liberal	Geoffrey Giles		67.5	+3.5
Labor	Adolf Thiel		32.5	−3.5
Liberal hold		Swing	+3.5	

=== Barker ===
This section is an excerpt from Electoral results for the Division of Barker § 1974

1974 Australian federal election: Barker
Party	Candidate	Votes	%	±%
Liberal	Jim Forbes	28,280	48.5	−8.4
Labor	Jim Hennessy	18,765	32.2	−7.6
Country	Malcolm Adams	6,655	11.4	+11.4
Liberal Movement	Dick Clampett	3,811	6.5	+6.5
Australia	Colyn van Reenen	542	0.9	+0.9
Independent	Arthur Strachan	228	0.4	+0.4
Total formal votes		58,281	97.4	
Informal votes		1,568	2.6	
Turnout		59,849	96.4	
Two-party-preferred result
Liberal	Jim Forbes		65.2	+5.7
Labor	Jim Hennessy		34.8	−5.7
Liberal hold		Swing	+5.7	

=== Bonython ===
This section is an excerpt from Electoral results for the Division of Bonython § 1974

1974 Australian federal election: Bonython
Party	Candidate	Votes	%	±%
Labor	Martin Nicholls	44,723	60.4	−1.3
Liberal	Rudolph Masopust	15,310	20.7	−10.0
Liberal Movement	Jan Staska	6,131	8.3	+8.3
Australia	Derek Ball	3,969	5.4	+5.4
Country	Alan Irving	3,900	5.3	+5.3
Total formal votes		74,033	96.8	
Informal votes		2,473	3.2	
Turnout		76,506	96.2	
Two-party-preferred result
Labor	Martin Nicholls		65.6	+1.5
Liberal	Rudolph Masopust		34.4	−1.5
Labor hold		Swing	+1.5	

=== Boothby ===
This section is an excerpt from Electoral results for the Division of Boothby § 1974

1974 Australian federal election: Boothby
Party	Candidate	Votes	%	±%
Liberal	John McLeay	26,193	45.1	−7.3
Labor	John Trainer	19,993	34.4	−3.7
Liberal Movement	Peter Berman	10,477	18.0	+18.0
Australia	Colin Miller	1,423	2.4	−3.2
Total formal votes		58,086	97.9	
Informal votes		1,259	2.1	
Turnout		59,345	95.6	
Two-party-preferred result
Liberal	John McLeay	35,469	61.1	+4.1
Labor	John Trainer	22,617	38.9	−4.1
Liberal hold		Swing	+4.1	

=== Grey ===
This section is an excerpt from Electoral results for the Division of Grey § 1974

1974 Australian federal election: Grey
Party	Candidate	Votes	%	±%
Labor	Laurie Wallis	28,373	52.7	−1.3
Liberal	Dennis Burman	17,337	32.2	−2.6
Country	George Heading	6,112	11.4	+11.4
Australia	Bill McMahon	1,124	2.1	+2.1
Liberal Movement	Nigel Clarke	882	1.6	+1.6
Total formal votes		53,828	97.6	
Informal votes		1,344	2.4	
Turnout		55,172	96.1	
Two-party-preferred result
Labor	Laurie Wallis		55.5	−2.9
Liberal	Dennis Burman		44.5	+2.9
Labor hold		Swing	−2.9	

=== Hawker ===
This section is an excerpt from Electoral results for the Division of Hawker § 1974

1974 Australian federal election: Hawker
Party	Candidate	Votes	%	±%
Labor	Ralph Jacobi	31,735	55.6	−0.9
Liberal	Henry Winter	17,717	31.1	−5.6
Liberal Movement	Peter Holder	6,744	11.8	+11.8
Australia	Phillip Vickery	849	1.5	+1.5
Total formal votes		57,045	97.5	
Informal votes		1,481	2.5	
Turnout		58,526	96.3	
Two-party-preferred result
Labor	Ralph Jacobi		60.2	+1.3
Liberal	Henry Winter		39.8	−1.3
Labor hold		Swing	+1.3	

=== Hindmarsh ===
This section is an excerpt from Electoral results for the Division of Hindmarsh § 1974

1974 Australian federal election: Hindmarsh
Party	Candidate	Votes	%	±%
Labor	Clyde Cameron	37,106	62.9	+0.2
Liberal	Iris MacDonald	16,311	27.6	−4.2
Liberal Movement	Kelvin Schultz	4,508	7.6	+7.6
Australia	Wayne Kelly	1,087	1.8	+1.8
Total formal votes		59,012	96.5	
Informal votes		2,115	3.5	
Turnout		61,127	96.2	
Two-party-preferred result
Labor	Clyde Cameron		65.9	+2.1
Liberal	Iris MacDonald		34.1	−2.1
Labor hold		Swing	+2.1	

=== Kingston ===
This section is an excerpt from Electoral results for the Division of Kingston § 1974

1974 Australian federal election: Kingston
Party	Candidate	Votes	%	±%
Labor	Richard Gun	35,647	52.9	+1.0
Liberal	Peter Tonkin	24,117	35.8	−8.4
Liberal Movement	Peter Heysen	6,771	10.1	+10.1
Australia	Janet Veilands	833	1.2	+1.2
Total formal votes		67,368	98.1	
Informal votes		1,281	1.9	
Turnout		68,649	96.8	
Two-party-preferred result
Labor	Richard Gun		56.1	+3.4
Liberal	Peter Tonkin		43.9	−3.4
Labor hold		Swing	+3.4	

=== Port Adelaide ===
This section is an excerpt from Electoral results for the Division of Port Adelaide § 1974

1974 Australian federal election: Port Adelaide
Party	Candidate	Votes	%	±%
Labor	Mick Young	36,678	65.3	−4.4
Liberal	Clarence Hinson	13,464	24.0	−0.3
Liberal Movement	Jean Lawrie	3,701	6.6	+6.6
Independent	James Mitchell	1,423	2.5	+0.5
Australia	Alan Jamieson	904	1.6	+1.6
Total formal votes		56,170	95.8	
Informal votes		2,463	4.2	
Turnout		58,633	96.4	
Two-party-preferred result
Labor	Mick Young		70.9	−0.6
Liberal	Clarence Hinson		29.1	+0.6
Labor hold		Swing	−0.6	

=== Sturt ===
This section is an excerpt from Electoral results for the Division of Sturt § 1974

1974 Australian federal election: Sturt
Party	Candidate	Votes	%	±%
Liberal	Ian Wilson	28,799	45.4	−5.1
Labor	Graham Maguire	28,088	44.2	−2.0
Liberal Movement	Betty Hall	4,553	7.2	+7.2
Australia	Roger Marshman	1,034	1.6	+1.6
Independent	Anthony Figallo	1,018	1.6	+1.6
Total formal votes		63,492	97.2	
Informal votes		1,802	2.8	
Turnout		65,294	96.7	
Two-party-preferred result
Liberal	Ian Wilson	33,005	52.0	−0.2
Labor	Graham Maguire	30,487	48.0	+0.2
Liberal hold		Swing	−0.2	

=== Wakefield ===
This section is an excerpt from Electoral results for the Division of Wakefield § 1974

1974 Australian federal election: Wakefield
Party	Candidate	Votes	%	±%
Liberal	Bert Kelly	22,761	49.4	−0.3
Labor	Peter Dewhurst	13,304	28.9	−3.1
Country	Ronald Crosby	6,225	13.5	−1.6
Liberal Movement	John Freebairn	3,316	7.2	+7.2
Australia	Ian Swan	476	1.0	+1.0
Total formal votes		46,082	97.5	
Informal votes		1,174	2.5	
Turnout		47,256	96.4	
Two-party-preferred result
Liberal	Bert Kelly		67.5	+1.6
Labor	Peter Dewhurst		32.5	−1.6
Liberal hold		Swing	+1.6	

== Western Australia ==
1974 Australian federal election (Western Australia)
← 1972	18 May 1974	1975 →

All 10 WA seats in the House of Representatives 5 seats needed for a majority
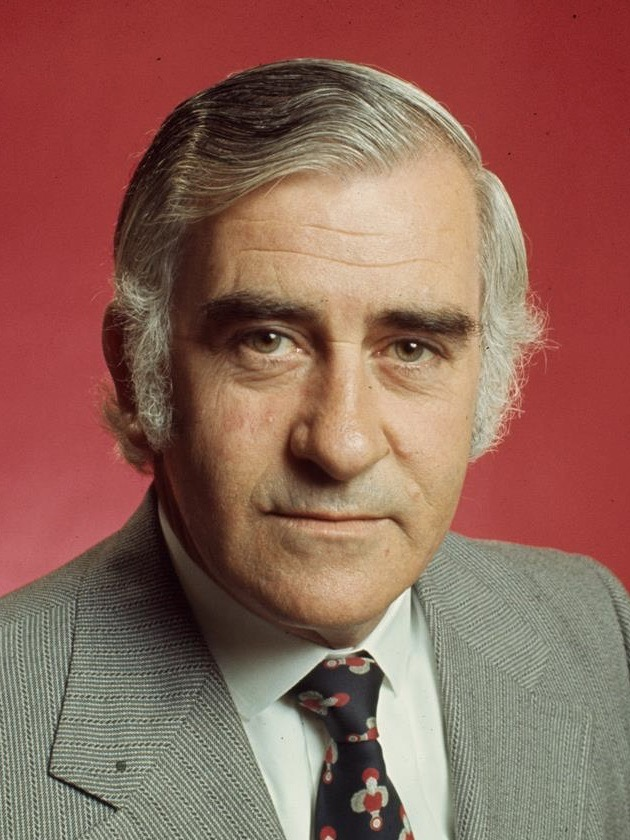

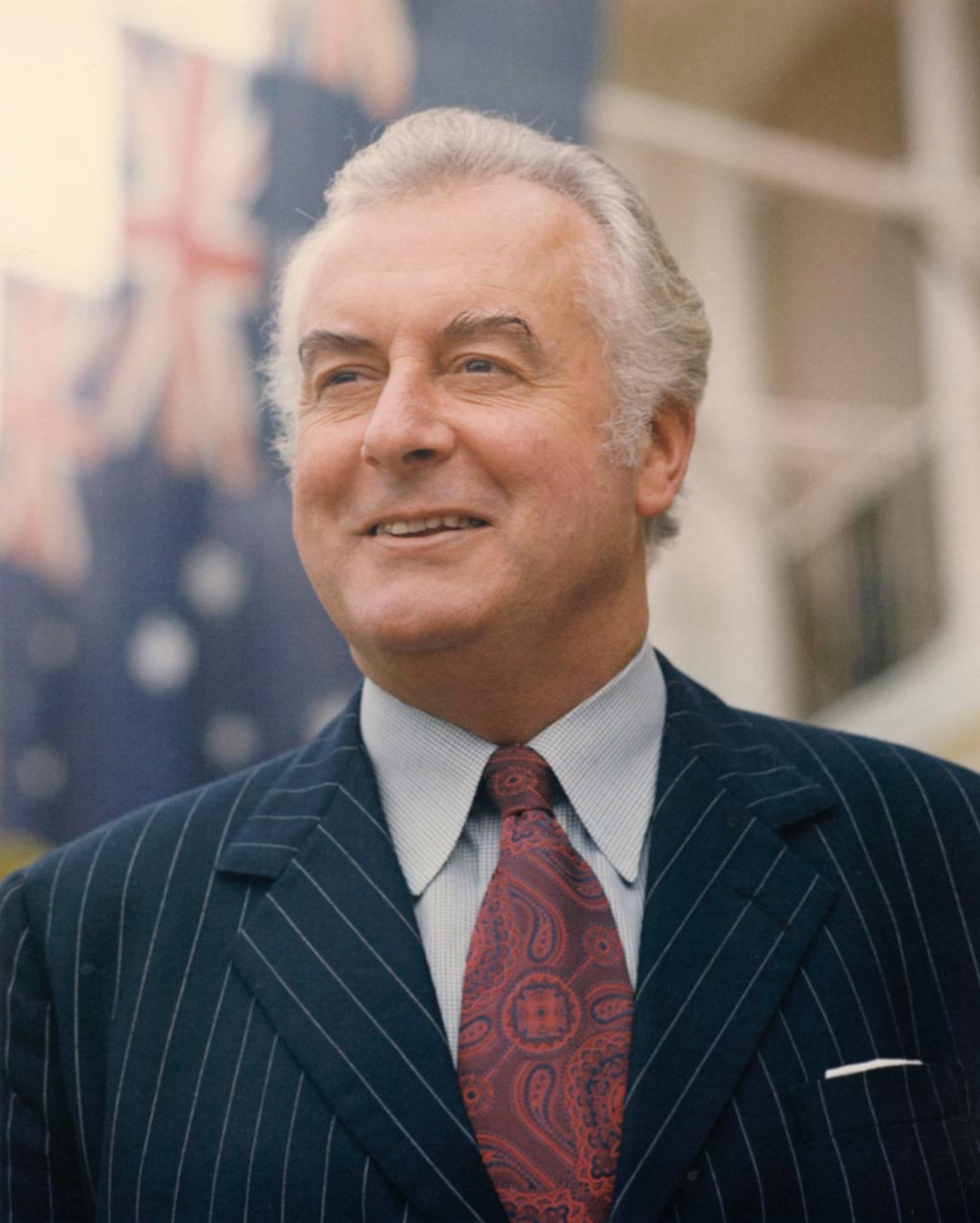
	First party	Second party
Leader	Billy Snedden	Gough Whitlam
Party	Coalition	Labor
Seats before	5	4
Seats won	5	5
Seat change	Steady	▲1
Popular vote	293,656	261,107
Percentage	52.1%	46.3%
Swing	▲4.5pp	▲0.2pp
TPP	51.5%	48.5%
TPP swing	▼0.2pp	▲0.2pp

=== Canning ===
This section is an excerpt from Electoral results for the Division of Canning § 1974

1974 Australian federal election: Canning
Party	Candidate	Votes	%	±%
Liberal	Mel Bungey	19,133	35.7	+8.8
National Alliance	John Hallett	16,961	31.7	−2.9
Labor	James Laffer	16,378	30.6	−3.2
Australia	John Duncan	1,093	2.0	−0.4
Total formal votes		53,565	97.4	
Informal votes		1,427	2.6	
Turnout		54,992	95.7	
Two-party-preferred result
Liberal	Mel Bungey	34,417	64.3	+64.3
National Alliance	John Hallett	19,148	35.7	−26.1
Liberal gain from National Alliance		Swing	+26.1	

=== Curtin ===
This section is an excerpt from Electoral results for the Division of Curtin § 1974

1974 Australian federal election: Curtin
Party	Candidate	Votes	%	±%
Liberal	Victor Garland	33,267	53.9	−1.9
Labor	John Crouch	24,016	38.9	+5.3
National Alliance	Terry McDonnell	3,051	4.9	−0.4
Australia	Dennis Fyfe	728	1.2	−4.1
Independent	Jeannette Forsyth	700	1.1	+1.1
Total formal votes		61,762	97.7	
Informal votes		1,460	2.3	
Turnout		63,222	94.3	
Two-party-preferred result
Liberal	Victor Garland		59.3	−2.9
Labor	John Crouch		40.7	+2.9
Liberal hold		Swing	−2.9	

=== Forrest ===
This section is an excerpt from Electoral results for the Division of Forrest § 1974

1974 Australian federal election: Forrest
Party	Candidate	Votes	%	±%
Liberal	Peter Drummond	24,860	46.7	+14.7
Labor	Albert Newman	19,801	37.2	−6.4
National Alliance	Terence Best	7,967	15.0	−8.4
Australia	Lawrence Gibson	569	1.1	+0.1
Total formal votes		53,197	98.0	
Informal votes		1,084	2.0	
Turnout		54,281	96.4	
Two-party-preferred result
Liberal	Peter Drummond	32,689	61.4	+7.8
Labor	Albert Newman	20,508	38.6	−7.8
Liberal hold		Swing	+7.8	

=== Fremantle ===
This section is an excerpt from Electoral results for the Division of Fremantle § 1974

1974 Australian federal election: Fremantle
Party	Candidate	Votes	%	±%
Labor	Kim Beazley Sr.	35,932	59.4	+3.2
Liberal	Douglas Fernihough	21,711	35.9	−3.5
National Alliance	Peter Moorehouse	2,136	3.5	+0.5
Australia	Charles Pierce	723	1.2	+1.2
Total formal votes		60,502	97.5	
Informal votes		1,554	2.5	
Turnout		62,056	95.5	
Two-party-preferred result
Labor	Kim Beazley Sr.		60.6	+2.5
Liberal	Douglas Fernihough		39.4	−2.5
Labor hold		Swing	+2.5	

=== Kalgoorlie ===
This section is an excerpt from Electoral results for the Division of Kalgoorlie § 1974

1974 Australian federal election: Kalgoorlie
Party	Candidate	Votes	%	±%
Labor	Fred Collard	22,925	50.3	−8.5
Liberal	Mick Cotter	19,072	41.9	+6.9
National Alliance	George Kyros	2,520	5.5	−0.7
Australia	Ian Kelly	555	1.2	+1.2
Independent	James Jackson	487	1.1	+1.1
Total formal votes		45,559	97.4	
Informal votes		1,216	2.6	
Turnout		46,775	88.1	
Two-party-preferred result
Labor	Fred Collard		52.1	−7.3
Liberal	Mick Cotter		47.9	+7.3
Labor hold		Swing	−7.3	

=== Moore ===
This section is an excerpt from Electoral results for the Division of Moore § 1974

1974 Australian federal election: Moore
Party	Candidate	Votes	%	±%
Labor	Rodney Boland	21,220	37.1	−1.6
Liberal	John Hyde	20,279	35.5	+7.6
National Alliance	Don Maisey	14,889	26.1	−7.3
Australia	Syd Hickman	752	1.3	+1.3
Total formal votes		57,140	97.7	
Informal votes		1,322	2.3	
Turnout		58,462	95.9	
Two-party-preferred result
Liberal	John Hyde	34,565	60.5	+60.5
Labor	Rodney Boland	22,275	39.5	−1.4
Liberal gain from National Alliance		Swing	+1.4	

=== Perth ===
This section is an excerpt from Electoral results for the Division of Perth § 1974

1974 Australian federal election: Perth
Party	Candidate	Votes	%	±%
Labor	Joe Berinson	33,786	56.5	+4.0
Liberal	Derrick Tomlinson	22,529	37.7	−4.5
National Alliance	Dorothy Cranley	2,487	4.2	−1.1
Communist	Paul Marsh	539	0.9	+0.9
Australia	Wilfred Campin	411	0.7	+0.7
Total formal votes		59,752	96.6	
Informal votes		2,077	3.4	
Turnout		61,829	93.9	
Two-party-preferred result
Labor	Joe Berinson		58.2	+4.6
Liberal	Derrick Tomlinson		41.8	−4.6
Labor hold		Swing	+4.6	

=== Stirling ===
This section is an excerpt from Electoral results for the Division of Stirling § 1974

1974 Australian federal election: Stirling
Party	Candidate	Votes	%	±%
Labor	Graham Reece	25,648	47.6	+1.5
Liberal	Ian Viner	24,942	46.3	−1.0
National Alliance	Marie Clark	2,797	5.2	−1.4
Australia	Carolyn Tonge	471	0.9	+0.9
Total formal votes		53,858	97.8	
Informal votes		1,200	2.2	
Turnout		55,058	94.7	
Two-party-preferred result
Liberal	Ian Viner	26,935	50.0	−2.9
Labor	Graham Reece	26,923	50.0	+2.9
Liberal hold		Swing	−2.9	

=== Swan ===
This section is an excerpt from Electoral results for the Division of Swan § 1974

1974 Australian federal election: Swan
Party	Candidate	Votes	%	±%
Labor	Adrian Bennett	33,225	53.3	+4.3
Liberal	Geoffrey Hale	24,251	38.9	−4.8
National Alliance	Pietro Bendotti	4,087	6.6	+2.8
Australia	Archelaus Marshall	814	1.3	−0.6
Total formal votes		62,377	97.2	
Informal votes		1,816	2.8	
Turnout		64,193	94.4	
Two-party-preferred result
Labor	Adrian Bennett		55.6	+3.9
Liberal	Geoffrey Hale		44.4	−3.9
Labor hold		Swing	+3.9	

=== Tangney ===
This section is an excerpt from Electoral results for the Division of Tangney § 1974

1974 Australian federal election: Tangney
Party	Candidate	Votes	%	±%
Labor	John Dawkins	28,176	50.6	
Liberal	Peter Whyte	23,196	41.6	
National Alliance	June Bunce	3,430	6.2	
Australia	Wendy Russell-Brown	900	1.6	
Total formal votes		55,702	97.5	
Informal votes		1,419	2.5	
Turnout		57,121	94.9	
Two-party-preferred result
Labor	John Dawkins		53.1	+2.5
Liberal	Peter Whyte		46.9	−2.5
Labor notional hold		Swing	+2.5	

== Tasmania ==
1974 Australian federal election (Tasmania)
← 1972	18 May 1974	1975 →

All 5 Tasmanian seats in the House of Representatives 3 seats needed for a majority
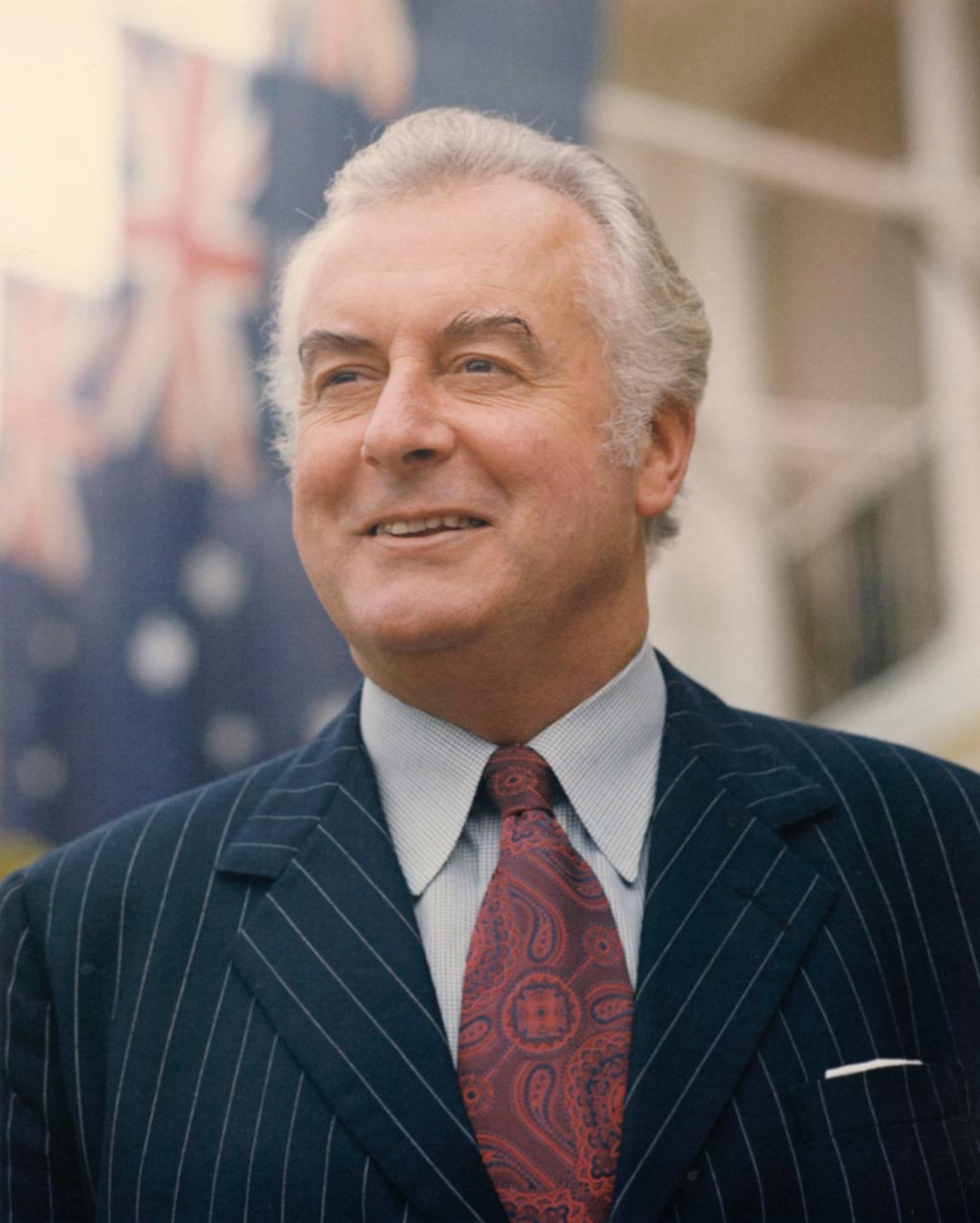

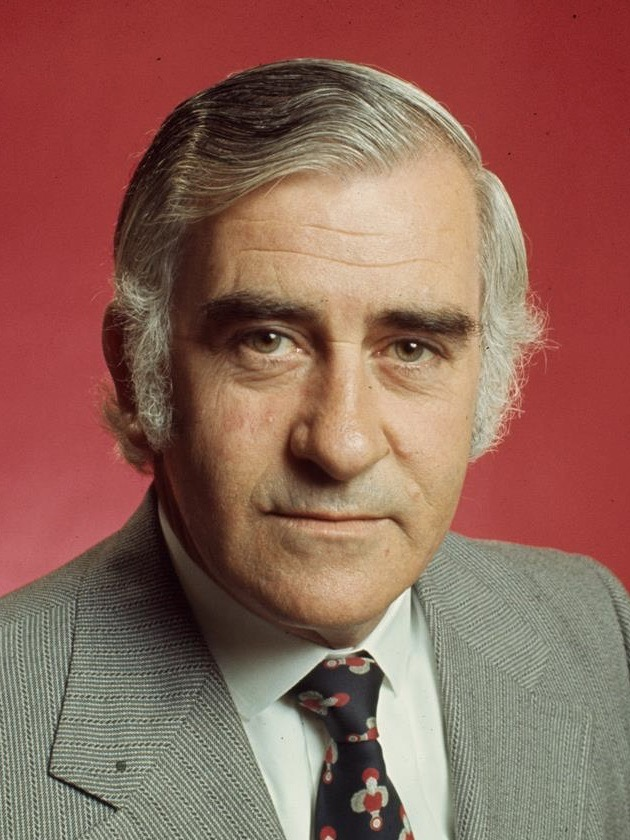
	First party	Second party
Leader	Gough Whitlam	Billy Snedden
Party	Labor	Coalition
Seats before	5	0
Seats won	5	0
Seat change	Steady	Steady
Popular vote	128,787	103,701
Percentage	55.1%	44.4%
Swing	▼3.8pp	▲9.6pp
TPP	55.4%	44.6%
TPP swing	▼5.1pp	▲5.1pp

=== Bass ===
This section is an excerpt from Electoral results for the Division of Bass § 1974

1974 Australian federal election: Bass
Party	Candidate	Votes	%	±%
Labor	Lance Barnard	23,677	54.0	−4.8
Liberal	John Beswick	20,137	46.0	+9.2
Total formal votes		43,814	98.0	
Informal votes		877	2.0	
Turnout		44,691	95.2	
Labor hold		Swing	−5.7	

=== Braddon ===
This section is an excerpt from Electoral results for the Division of Braddon § 1974

1974 Australian federal election: Braddon
Party	Candidate	Votes	%	±%
Labor	Ron Davies	26,075	53.3	−8.9
Liberal	Ray Groom	21,678	44.3	+9.9
Independent	John Chapman-Mortimer	767	1.6	+1.6
Australia	Walter Roach	423	0.9	+0.9
Total formal votes		48,943	98.2	
Informal votes		888	1.8	
Turnout		49,831	96.6	
Two-party-preferred result
Labor	Ron Davies		54.8	−8.1
Liberal	Ray Groom		45.2	+8.1
Labor hold		Swing	−8.1	

=== Denison ===
This section is an excerpt from Electoral results for the Division of Denison § 1974

1974 Australian federal election: Denison
Party	Candidate	Votes	%	±%
Labor	John Coates	25,626	52.8	+3.3
Liberal	Michael Hodgman	22,928	47.2	+7.5
Total formal votes		48,554	98.4	
Informal votes		773	1.6	
Turnout		49,327	95.8	
Labor hold		Swing	−1.8	

=== Franklin ===
This section is an excerpt from Electoral results for the Division of Franklin § 1974

1974 Australian federal election: Franklin
Party	Candidate	Votes	%	±%
Labor	Ray Sherry	29,161	62.9	−1.3
Liberal	Leo Jarvis	17,194	37.1	+5.2
Total formal votes		46,355	98.4	
Informal votes		758	1.6	
Turnout		47,113	96.9	
Labor hold		Swing	−2.1	

=== Wilmot ===
This section is an excerpt from Electoral results for the Division of Wilmot § 1974

1974 Australian federal election: Wilmot
Party	Candidate	Votes	%	±%
Labor	Gil Duthie	24,248	52.7	−7.4
Liberal	Max Burr	21,764	47.3	+16.0
Total formal votes		46,012	98.0	
Informal votes		917	2.0	
Turnout		46,929	97.1	
Labor hold		Swing	−9.2	

== Australian Capital Territory ==
1974 Australian federal election (Australian Capital Territory)
← 1972	18 May 1974	1975 →

All 2 ACT seats in the House of Representatives 1 seats needed for a majority
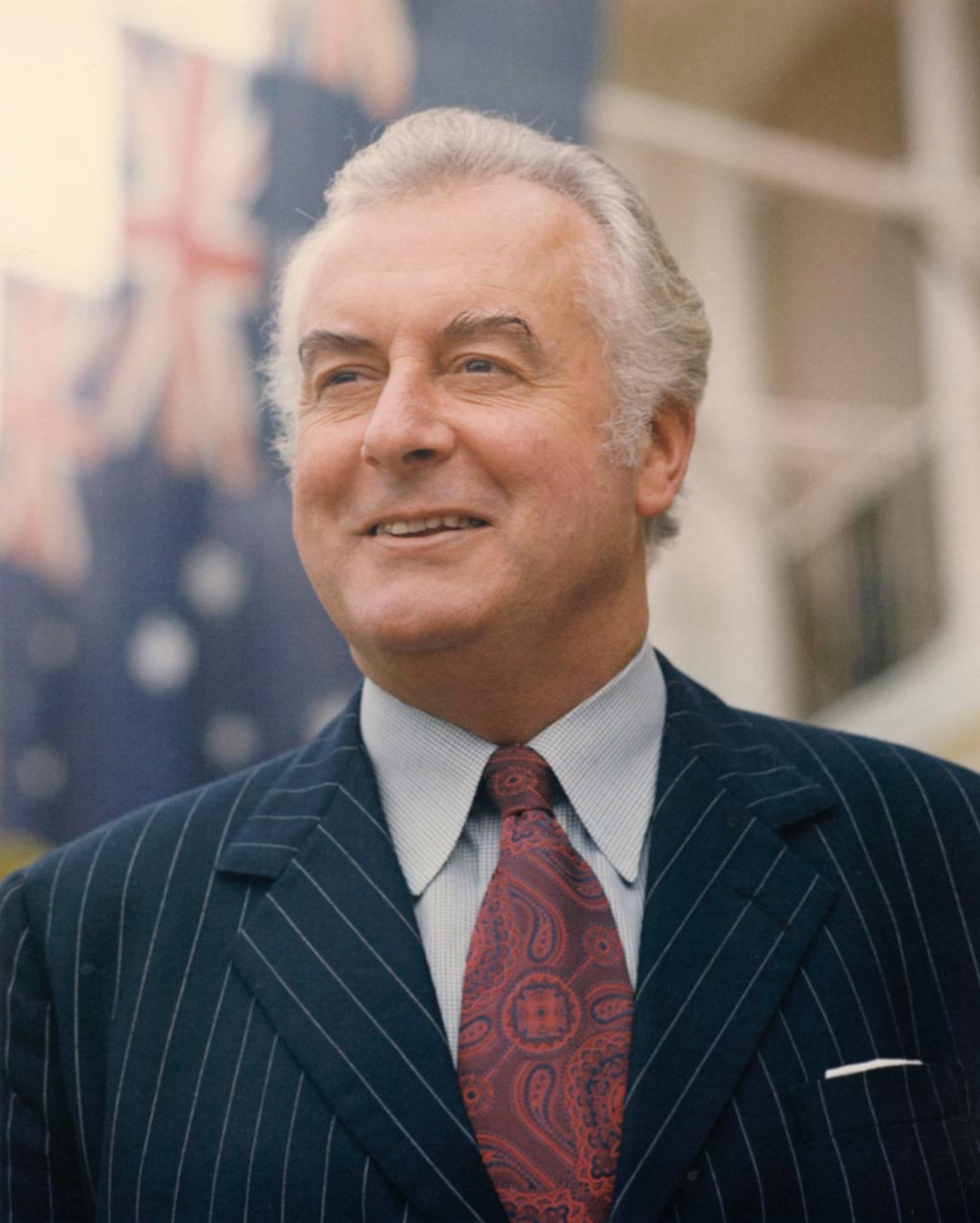

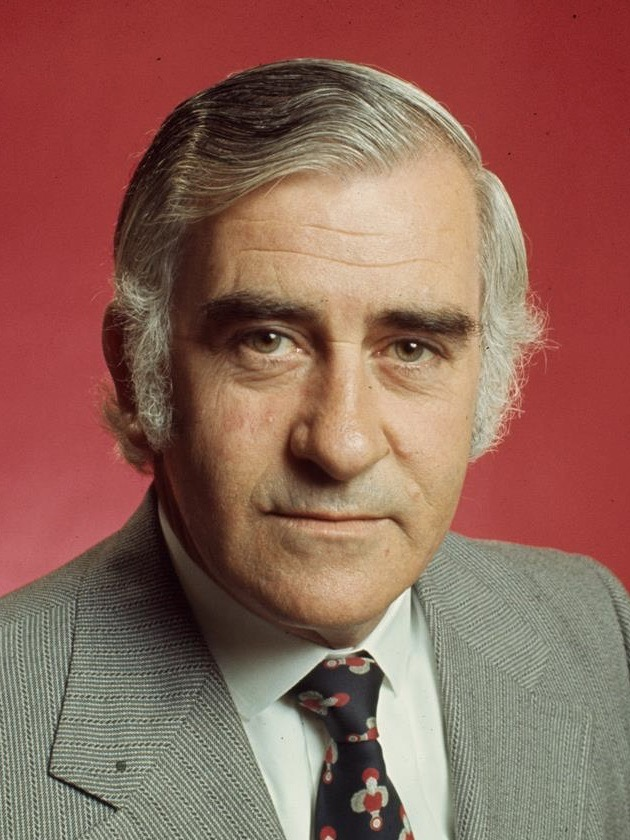
	First party	Second party
Leader	Gough Whitlam	Billy Snedden
Party	Labor	Coalition
Seats before	1	0
Seats won	2	0
Seat change	▲1	Steady
Popular vote	52,055	33,320
Percentage	54.83%	35.09%
Swing	▼7.60pp	▲12.29pp
TPP	59.70%	40.30%
TPP swing	▼8.30pp	▲8.30pp

=== Canberra ===
This section is an excerpt from Electoral results for the Division of Canberra § 1974

1974 Australian federal election: Canberra
Party	Candidate	Votes	%	±%
Labor	Kep Enderby	24,761	53.8	+1.7
Liberal	Peter Hughes	16,658	36.2	+13.4
Australia	Mary Thomas	2,520	5.5	−8.2
Country	Dorothy Mattress	1,871	4.1	+4.1
Republican	Doreen Story	211	0.5	+0.5
Total formal votes		46,021	98.9	
Informal votes		508	1.1	
Turnout		46,529	93.0	
Two-party-preferred result
Labor	Kep Enderby		57.1	−9.5
Liberal	Peter Hughes		42.9	+9.5
Labor notional hold		Swing	−9.5	

=== Fraser ===
This section is an excerpt from Electoral results for the Division of Fraser (Australian Capital Territory) § 1974

1974 Australian federal election: Fraser
Party	Candidate	Votes	%	±%
Labor	Ken Fry	27,294	57.3	+5.2
Liberal	Larry Pickering	16,662	35.0	+12.2
Australia	John Filler	1,610	3.4	−10.3
Country	Stephen Lamb	1,429	3.0	+3.0
Independent	Anthony Emerson-Elliott	393	0.8	+0.8
Independent	Kevin Wise	279	0.6	+0.6
Total formal votes		47,667	98.5	
Informal votes		741	1.5	
Turnout		48,408	91.9	
Two-party-preferred result
Labor	Ken Fry		60.7	−4.8
Liberal	Larry Pickering		39.3	+4.8
Labor notional hold		Swing	−4.8	

== Northern Territory ==
1974 Australian federal election (Northern Territory)
← 1972	18 May 1974	1975 →

Division of Northern Territory
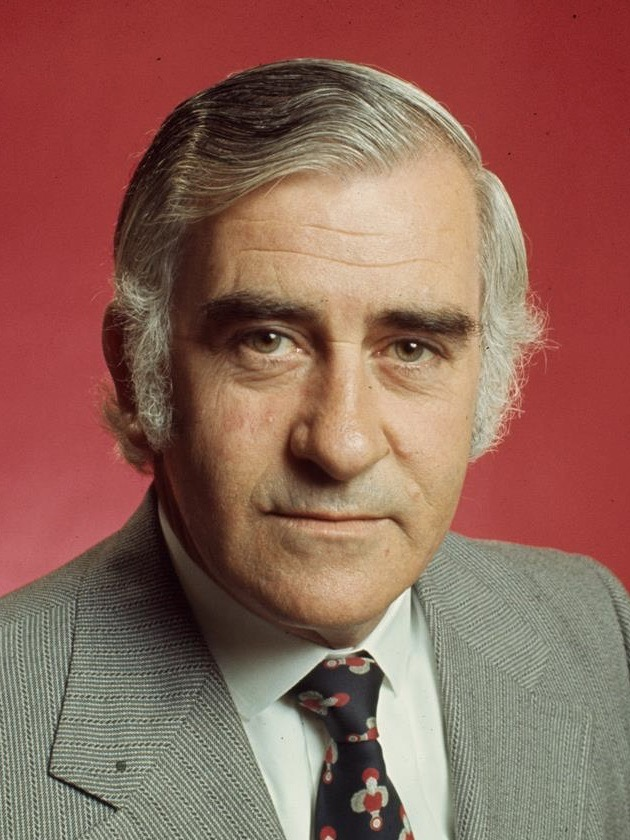

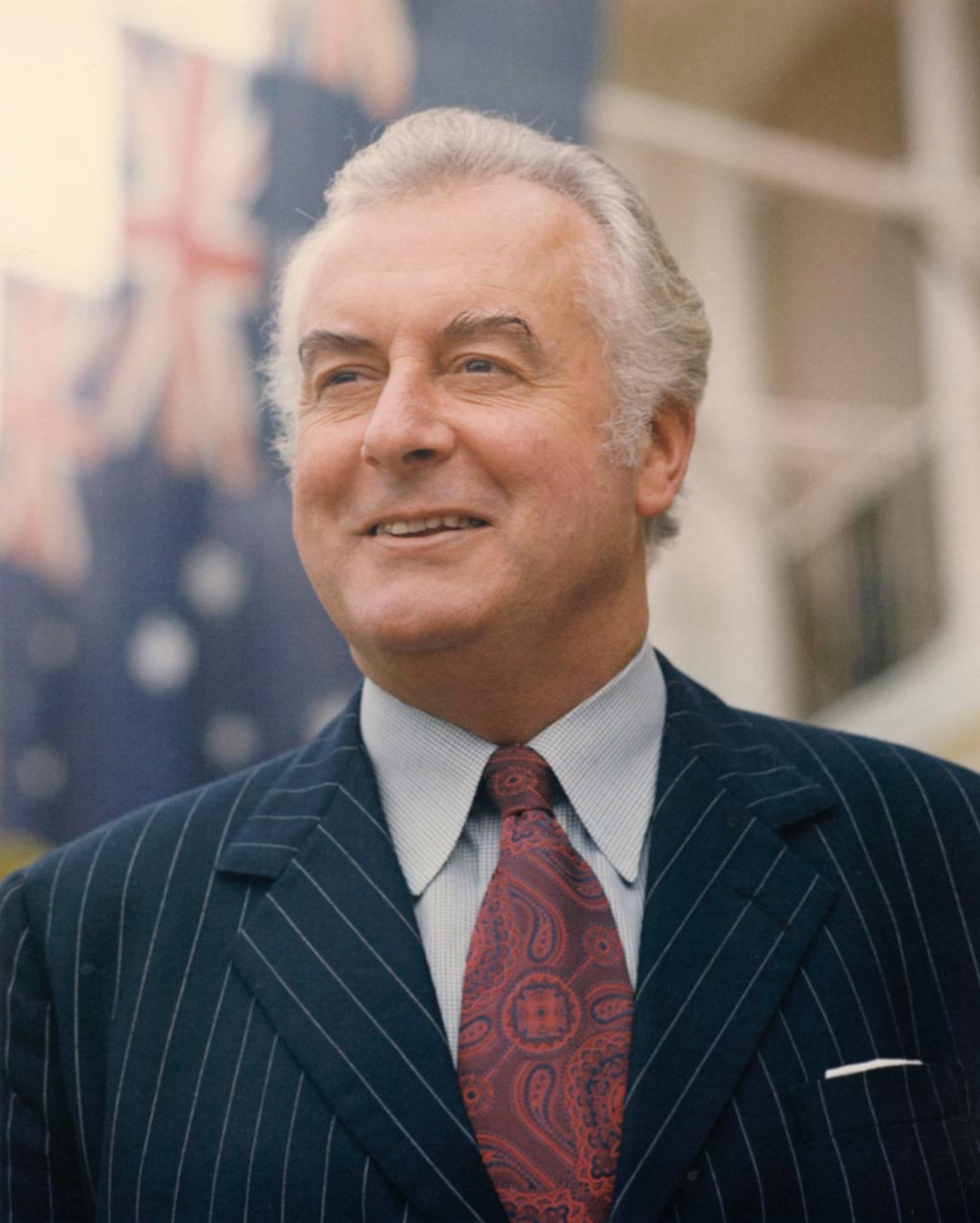
	First party	Second party
Leader	Billy Snedden	Gough Whitlam
Party	Coalition	Labor
Seats before	1	0
Seats won	1	0
Seat change	Steady	Steady
Popular vote	14,514	13,397
Percentage	49.3%	45.5%
Swing	▲2.0pp	▲6.2pp
TPP	52.7%	47.3%
TPP swing	▼1.8pp	▲1.8pp

This section is an excerpt from Electoral results for the Division of Northern Territory § 1974

1974 Australian federal election: Northern Territory
Party	Candidate	Votes	%	±%
Country	Sam Calder	14,514	49.3	+2.0
Labor	John Waters	13,397	45.5	+6.2
Independent	Alexander Allan-Stewart	1,557	5.3	−2.1
Total formal votes		29,468	97.2	
Informal votes		852	2.8	
Turnout		30,320	83.1	
Two-party-preferred result
Country	Sam Calder	15,522	52.7	−1.8
Labor	John Waters	13,946	47.3	+1.8
Country hold		Swing	−1.8	

== See also ==
- Candidates of the 1974 Australian federal election
- Members of the Australian House of Representatives, 1974–1975
