= Alison Patrick =

Alison Patrick may refer to:

- Alison Patrick (historian) (1921–2009), Australian historian
- Alison Peasgood (born Alison Patrick, 1987), British paratriathlete
