= Gareth Clayton (politician) =

Australian politician

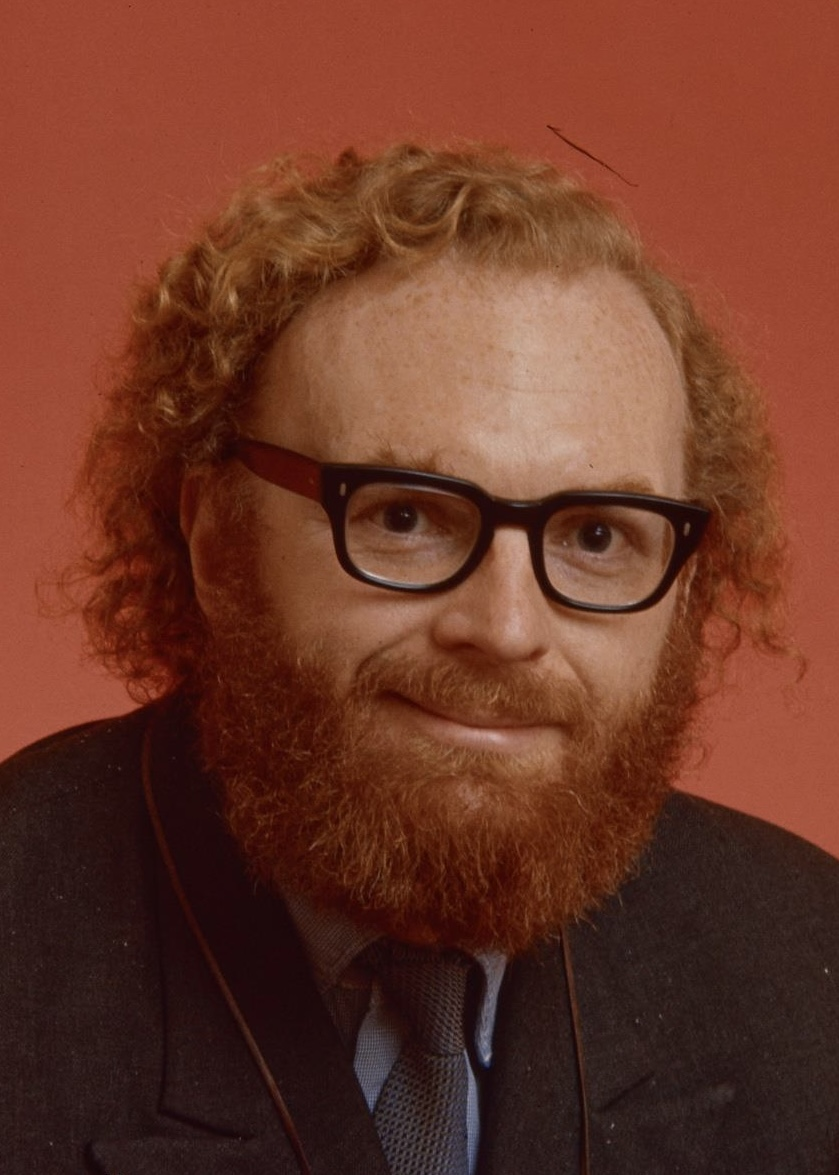
- Clayton in 1974

Member of the Australian Parliament for Isaacs
- In office 18 May 1974 – 13 December 1975
- Preceded by: David Hamer
- Succeeded by: David Hamer

Personal details
- Born: 3 February 1942 Dibden, Hampshire, England
- Died: 1 July 2010 (aged 68) Bangkok, Thailand
- Party: Labor
- Education: Liverpool University; Makerere University; Monash University
- Occupation: Academic; Statistician

Gareth Clayton (3 February 1942 – 1 July 2010) was an Australian academic, politician and activist. He was a member of the House of Representatives from 1974 to 1975, representing the Australian Labor Party (ALP), and was later active in the anti-nuclear movement. He held a Ph.D. in mathematical statistics and lectured in statistics in Australia and Thailand.

== Early life ==
Clayton was born on 3 February 1942 in Dibden, Hampshire, England. He graduated Bachelor of Science from the University of Liverpool and also studied in Uganda, completing a diploma in education at Makerere University. He taught in Africa for two years before moving to Australia. At the time of his election to parliament he was working as a statistician and was studying at Monash University.

== Politics ==
Clayton was one of the organisers of the Vietnam Moratorium movement in Victoria. He was secretary of the Chelsea branch of the Australian Labor Party (ALP) in the early 1970s.

Clayton first stood for parliament at the 1972 federal election, losing to the incumbent Liberal MP David Hamer in the seat of Isaacs although recording a substantial swing to the ALP. He recontested Isaacs against Hamer at the 1974 election and was narrowly elected, one of only two seats won by the ALP at the election along with Joan Child's victory in Henty.

In parliament, Clayton served on the House of Representatives Standing Committee on Aboriginal Affairs, including briefly as deputy chair. In October 1974, he was a member of a delegation – along with Senator Arthur Gietzelt and anti-apartheid activist Neville Curtis – which met with the South African ambassador to protest the South African government's imprisonment of black student leaders.

Clayton lost his seat to former Liberal MP David Hamer in the ALP's landslide defeat at the 1975 election.

In the 1980s, Clayton was a co-convenor of the Movement Against Uranium Mining and was publicly critical of the Hawke government's uranium policies, stating they had "acted not only against ALP policy, but against the wishes of the majority of the Australian electorate". In 1987 he publicly opposed food irradiation, citing a link to the nuclear industry.

== Later activities ==
Clayton returned to academia after the end of his parliamentary career. He completed a Ph.D. in mathematical statistics at Monash University in 1985, with a thesis on spatial point processes. At the time he was awarded his doctorate he was a senior tutor in statistics at the University of Melbourne.

Clayton later moved to Thailand where he was a special lecturer in statistics for over a decade at King Mongkut's University of Technology North Bangkok. He was a regular contributor to The Nation, an English-language newspaper in Bangkok, writing on education, religion and politics.

Clayton died on 1 July 2010, due to injuries sustained in a road accident in Bangkok.

Parliament of Australia
Preceded by David Hamer	Member for Isaacs; 1974–1975	Succeeded by David Hamer
