= Alison Patrick (historian) =

Australian historian

Alison Patrick FAHA
- Born: Alison Mary Houston Hamer; 24 March 1921; Kew, Victoria, Australia
- Died: 16 March 2009 (aged 87); Canterbury, Victoria, Australia
- Relatives: Rupert Hamer (1916–2004); David Hamer (1923–2002)

Academic background
- Education: University of Melbourne

Alison Mary Houston Patrick FAHA (nee Hamer; 24 March 1921 – 16 March 2009) was an Australian historian and scholar of the French Revolution. In 1977 she was the first woman elected head of the Department of History at the University of Melbourne.

== Early life and education ==
Alison Mary Houston Hamer was born on 24 March 1921 in Kew, Victoria. She was the third child and only daughter of former nurse Nancy (née McLuckie) and solicitor Hubert Hamer. Her brothers included Sir Rupert Hamer, Premier of Victoria and David Hamer, federal Liberal politician. She was educated at St Catherine's School in Toorak and then graduated with a BA from the University of Melbourne in 1942 and was awarded the Dwight Prize. Her PhD thesis was published by Johns Hopkins University Press in 1972.

== Career ==
Patrick's career as an academic at the University of Melbourne began in 1946 when she was employed in a part-time role. In 1963 she was appointed lecturer, progressing to reader. In 1977 she was the first woman to be elected head of the Department of History at the University of Melbourne. Not long before her retirement in 1986, Patrick accepted the role of head of the Italian Department at the university.

She was elected Fellow of the Australian Academy of the Humanities.

== Selected works ==
- Patrick, Alison (1972), The Men of the First French Republic: Political Alignments in the National Convention of 1792, Johns Hopkins University Press, ISBN 978-1-4214-3321-9

== Personal ==
Patrick married James Finlay Patrick in 1944. She died in Canterbury, Victoria on 16 March 2009 and was survived by three of her four children and their families. Her husband predeceased her on 8 November 2004.
