= Larry Pickering =

Australian cartoonist

- Born: Lawrence Pickering; 18 October 1942; Australia
- Died: 19 November 2018 (aged 76); Arundel, Queensland, Australia
- Known for: Cartoonist
- Spouse: Carol
- Awards: Walkley Awards, 1971, 1972, 1973, 1974
- Website: pickeringpost.com

Lawrence Pickering (18 October 1942 – 19 November 2018) was an Australian political cartoonist, caricaturist, and illustrator of books and calendars. The winner of four Walkley Awards for his work, Pickering largely retired from political cartooning in the 1980s but returned to the field in 2011. His cartoons lampooning then Prime Minister Julia Gillard in 2012 were particularly vitriolic, and many of his later cartoons were considered offensive to several minority groups.

== Career ==
Pickering was born in Australia on 18 October 1942. Initially employed as a proofreader, Pickering was able to gain the attention of John Allan, the editor of The Canberra Times. Allan gave Pickering the opportunity to work for the paper as a political cartoonist, and Pickering's early work coincided with the Whitlam and Fraser governments. It was at this time his first book of cartoons, The Hansard Papers, written by Reuters Economic Services Canberra correspondent Michael Guy and illustrated by Pickering was published and went to No. 1 on the Australian bestseller lists.

Pickering was awarded two Walkley Awards with The Canberra Times for his work, one in 1971 and a second the following year in 1972. Pickering went on to win the award a further two times, in 1973 with The National Times, and in 1974 with The Sydney Morning Herald.

In 1976, Pickering moved to The Australian, where his "Jungle Series" was featured in the newspaper's weekend edition. He remained with The Australian for five years, before largely retiring from political cartooning in 1981 – although he continued to publish the "Pickering’s Playmates" calendars, and some of his work continued to appear in The Bulletin.

For the next thirty years Pickering focused on other pursuits, such as training racehorses and growing tomatoes, but in 2011 he returned to political cartooning. Publishing his cartoons online, Pickering became involved in political commentary through his blog "The Pickering Post", where he ran a series of posts in 2012 attacking Prime Minister Julia Gillard over the AWU affair. Gillard responded by referring to the website as "vile and sexist", and described Pickering as a "misogynist". He became well-known at this time for the vitriol directed at Gillard over the time she was in office.

== Controversies ==
=== Financial ===
In 2010, Pickering was made an undischarged bankrupt on petition from the father of his former de facto, but in reply denied he owed any money and stated his "only asset is a $250 set of golf clubs".

Pickering acknowledged he helped establish Cohen Strachan Investments, a betting software company which went into bankruptcy in 2010 with millions of dollars lost by gamblers. Pickering stated that he "feels sorry for people who lost money" but that he "had nothing to do" with the company. A private investigator employed by the gamblers presented a report to the Queensland Police and the Australian Securities and Investments Commission claiming ongoing links between the companies and Pickering, a claim he denied. In November 2015, Queensland Fraud Squad detectives reopened the investigation into Pickering's involvement in Cohen Strachan Investments. It was reported that police had interviewed him at his Gold Coast home.

The Supreme Court of Queensland found that Pickering derived "significant financial benefits" from Hamlyn Crest, the Australian distributor of the betting software, and that his denial of involvement in the management of the company was "thoroughly implausible".

=== Hate speech ===
On 10 February 2017, at a speech for the far-right Q Society, Pickering denounced Muslims and homosexuals, saying "I can't stand Muslims. If they are in the same street as me, I start shaking. They are not all bad [because] they do chuck pillow-biters off buildings."

=== Offensive cartoons ===
Some of his later cartoons were seen by many as offensive, being potentially racist and Islamophobic.

== Personal life ==
Pickering lived on the Gold Coast, Queensland. He had eleven children.

Pickering, a smoker, had lung cancer and had most of one lung removed in January 2016. After the operation, his doctors told him that he would be 'unlikely to survive to the end of 2016'. By 2018 Pickering was still posting on his blog, The Pickering Post.

Pickering died on the evening of 19 November 2018 at an Arundel Hospital, aged 76, with his wife and family at his side.

== Bibliography ==
- Pickering, Larry (1973) The best of Pickering: a collection of some of the best cartoons of Larry Pickering, Australia's most popular and successful political cartoonist, Federal Capital Press, Canberra. ISBN 0-9598675-0-3
- Pickering, Larry (1976) It's Pickering's best, Pickering Promotions Ltd, Gosford, NSW. ISBN 0-9596618-0-8
- Pickering, Larry (1980) A decade of Pickering, HEL Productions, Milsons Point, NSW. ISBN 0-9596618-9-1
