= David Hamer =

Australian politician (1923–2002)

David Hamer AM, DSC
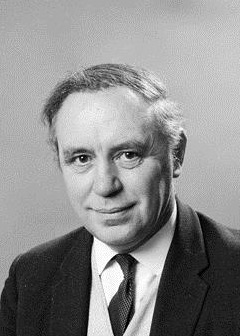
- Hamer in 1970

Senator for Victoria
- In office 1 July 1978 – 30 June 1990

Member of the Australian Parliament for Isaacs
- In office 13 December 1975 – 10 November 1977
- Preceded by: Gareth Clayton
- Succeeded by: Bill Burns
- In office 25 October 1969 – 18 May 1974
- Preceded by: New seat
- Succeeded by: Gareth Clayton

Personal details
- Born: 5 September 1923 Melbourne, Australia
- Died: 14 January 2002 (aged 78) Melbourne, Australia
- Party: Liberal
- Spouse: Barbara McPherson (m. 1955)
- Children: 3
- Occupation: Naval officer

Military service
- Allegiance: Australia
- Branch/service: Royal Australian Navy
- Years of service: 1937–1968
- Rank: Captain
- Commands: HMAS Vampire
- Battles/wars: Second World War; Battle of Leyte; Battle of Lingayen Gulf; Korean War
- Awards: Distinguished Service Cross

David John Hamer AM, DSC (5 September 1923 – 14 January 2002) was an Australian politician and Royal Australian Navy officer.

== Early life ==
Hamer was born in Melbourne on 5 September 1923. He was the youngest of four children born to Elizabeth Anne (née McLuckie) and Hubert Hamer; his older siblings included Victorian premier Rupert Hamer and historian Alison Patrick. His father's sister married George Swinburne.

Hamer attended preparatory schools in Toorak and Glen Iris, completing his secondary education as a boarder at Geelong Grammar School from 1934 to 1936. He entered the Royal Australian Naval College at the age of thirteen, graduating in 1940 and winning the prize for the best academic student. He played rugby union for the college and also secretly fought one bout as a professional boxer, against navy regulations.

== Naval career ==
Hamer was commissioned as a midshipman in January 1941 and posted to HMAS Canberra, serving in the Indian Ocean. He joined HMAS Napier in the Mediterranean in November 1941, then was seconded to the British Royal Navy where he served aboard HMS Revenge and later completed further training in England. Hamer joined HMAS Norman in January 1943 and was promoted lieutenant in August 1943.

In May 1944, Hamer was posted to HMAS Australia where he served as air defence officer during the battles of Leyte in October 1944 and Lingayen Gulf in January 1945. He was awarded the Distinguished Service Cross for his actions at Lingayen Gulf, "where he stood on the bridge of Australia and calmly called instructions to gunners as five kamikaze planes flew at the ship", narrowly escaping death.

Hamer returned to England for further training from 1945 to 1947, including at HMS Excellent and RNAS Dale (HMS Goldcrest). He subsequently served as flotilla gunnery officer aboard HMAS Bataan, HMAS Warramunga and HMAS Tobruk, and also as a gunnery instructor at HMAS Cerberus. He was promoted lieutenant commander in August 1951. Hamer re-joined HMAS Australia in early 1954 as fleet gunnery officer before transferring to aircraft carrier HMAS Sydney in June 1954. He was promoted commander in 1956 and then spent two years in England as senior naval instructor at the Joint Service Amphibious Warfare Centre at RM Poole.

Hamer represented the navy on the joint planning staff and helped coordinate the Department of Defence's move to Canberra in 1959. He was promoted captain in 1962 and served as director of naval intelligence from 1962 to 1963. He was then appointed commanding officer of HMAS Vampire, commanding the Australian Destroyer Squadron from 1963 to 1965 during Australia's involvement in the Indonesia–Malaysia confrontation. Hamer's final naval appointment was as director of project coordination from 1965 to 1968. He also served as an honorary aide-de-camp to the governor-general of Australia during that time.

== Political career ==
In 1969, David was elected to the Australian House of Representatives as the Liberal member for Isaacs. Narrowly defeated by Labor candidate Gareth Clayton in 1974, he became a political columnist for The Age newspaper and undertook a Master of Arts at Monash University in Constitutional Law, studying the historical role of the Australian Senate. He was re-elected to Isaacs in 1975 but contested the Senate in 1977. He was successful, and remained a Liberal senator for Victoria until his retirement in 1990. A strong supporter of improving the function of the Senate as a house of review, he was Chairman of Committees as well as Deputy President of the Senate from 1983 to 1990.

Hamer was also interested in promoting the arts in Australia, helping establish the Arts Council of Victoria, and serving as President of the Arts Council of Australia and of the Australian Film Institute. He was a keen supporter of the establishment of the National Film and Sound Archive as a way to collect and make accessible Australia's rich audiovisual history.

== Later life, family and legacy ==
Hamer died of leukaemia on 14 January 2002, aged 78, in Melbourne. His publications include:

- The Australian Senate 1901–1918, An Appraisal (1976);
- Can Responsible Government Survive In Australia? (1994); and
- Bombers Versus Battleships – The Struggle Between Ships and Aircraft for Control of the Surface of the Sea (1998) ISBN 9781557500434

In 2004, the Hamer Family Fund was set up in honour of Hamer and his siblings, with aims including projects that advance the arts, the environment and good government in Australia.

Parliament of Australia
Preceded by New seat	Member for Isaacs; 1969–1974	Succeeded by Gareth Clayton
Preceded by Gareth Clayton	Member for Isaacs; 1975–1977	Succeeded by Bill Burns
