= 1975 Australian House of Representatives election =

This is a list of electoral division results for the Australian 1975 federal election.

== Overall ==
This section is an excerpt from 1975 Australian federal election § House of Representatives results

Government (91) Coalition Liberal (68) NCP (22) CLP (1) Opposition (36) Labor (36)

House of Reps (IRV) – 1975–77—Turnout 95.39% (CV) – Informal 1.89%
Party	Votes	%	Swing	Seats	Change
Liberal–NCP coalition	4,102,078	53.05	+7.32	91	+30
Liberal	3,232,159	41.80	+6.85	68	+28
National Country	853,943	11.04	+0.28	22	+1
Country Liberal	15,976	0.21	+0.21	1	+1
Labor	3,313,004	42.84	−6.46	36	−30
Democratic Labor	101,750	1.32	−0.10	0	0
Workers	60,130	0.78	+0.78	0	0
Liberal Movement	49,484	0.64	–0.14	0	0
Australia	33,630	0.43	−1.89	0	0
Communist	9,393	0.12	+0.11	0	0
Independent	63,109	0.82	+0.42	0	0
Total	7,732,578			127	
Two-party-preferred (estimated)
Liberal–NCP coalition	Win	55.70	+7.40	91	+30
Labor		44.30	−7.40	36	−30

Popular vote
Labor	42.84%
Liberal	41.80%
National	11.25%
DLP	1.32%
Other	2.79%

Two-party-preferred vote
Coalition	55.70%
Labor	44.30%

Parliament seats
Coalition	71.65%
Labor	28.35%

== New South Wales ==
1975 Australian federal election (New South Wales)
← 1974	13 December 1975	1977 →

All 45 NSW seats in the House of Representatives 23 seats needed for a majority
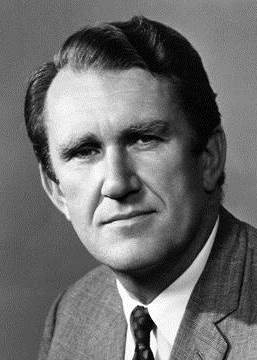

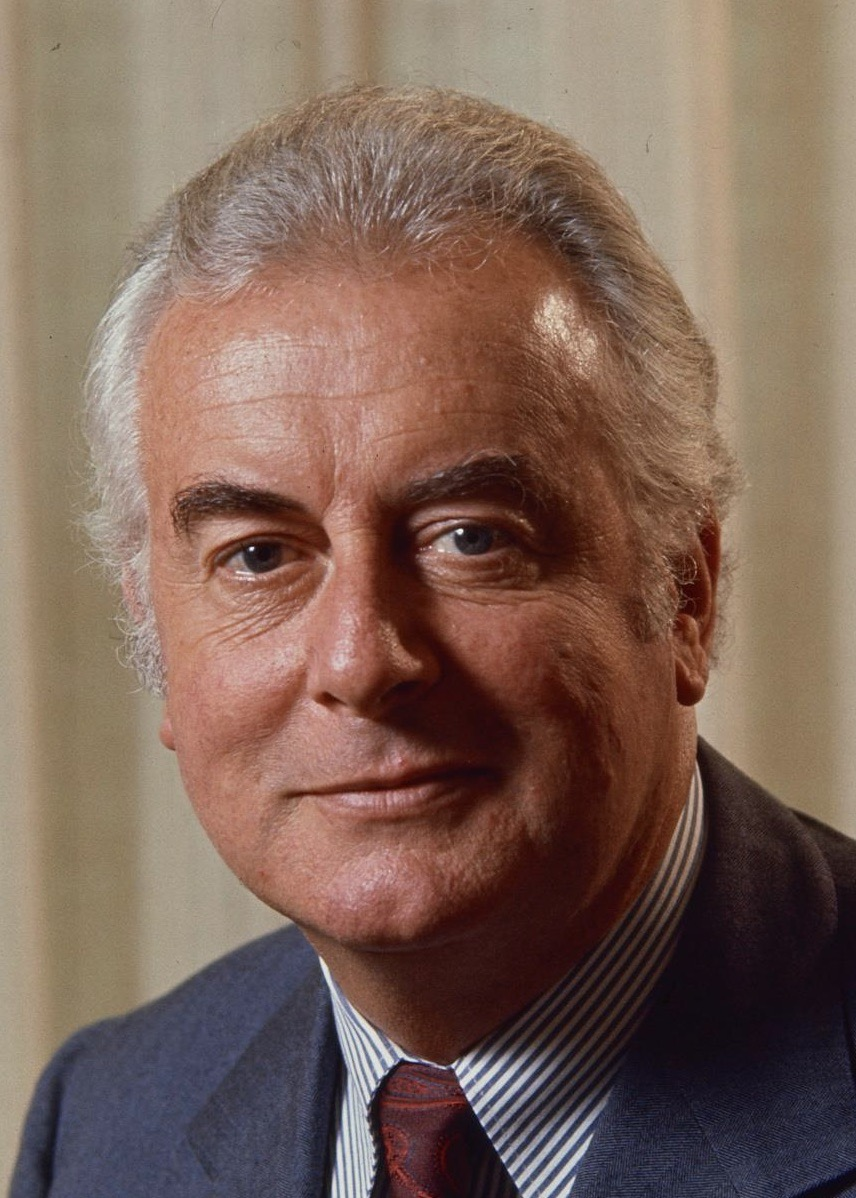
	First party	Second party
Leader	Malcolm Fraser	Gough Whitlam
Party	Coalition	Labor
Seats before	20	25
Seats won	28	17
Seat change	▲8	▼8
Popular vote	1,426,796	1,260,335
Percentage	51.5%	45.5%
Swing	▲7.5pp	▼7.2pp
TPP	53.2%	46.8%
TPP swing	▲8.1pp	▼8.1pp

=== Banks ===
This section is an excerpt from Electoral results for the Division of Banks § 1975

1975 Australian federal election: Banks
Party	Candidate	Votes	%	±%
Labor	Vince Martin	30,617	51.7	−9.2
Liberal	Maxwell Gibson	26,035	43.9	+10.2
Independent	Denise Arrow	1,939	3.3	+3.3
Workers	Ralph Skelton	681	1.1	+1.1
Total formal votes		59,272	97.9	−0.5
Informal votes		1,249	2.1	+0.5
Turnout		60,521	96.7	+0.3
Two-party-preferred result
Labor	Vince Martin		53.1	−10.4
Liberal	Maxwell Gibson		46.9	+10.4
Labor hold		Swing	−10.4	

=== Barton ===
This section is an excerpt from Electoral results for the Division of Barton § 1975

1975 Australian federal election: Barton
Party	Candidate	Votes	%	±%
Liberal	Jim Bradfield	34,209	53.5	+9.5
Labor	Murray Gainsford	28,179	44.1	−9.6
Workers	Maxwell Shean	868	1.4	−0.9
Australia	Clifford Willard	706	1.1	−1.2
Total formal votes		63,962	98.7	
Informal votes		872	1.3	
Turnout		64,834	96.0	
Two-party-preferred result
Liberal	Jim Bradfield		54.9	+10.0
Labor	Murray Gainsford		45.1	−10.0
Liberal gain from Labor		Swing	+10.0	

=== Bennelong ===
This section is an excerpt from Electoral results for the Division of Bennelong § 1975

1975 Australian federal election: Bennelong
Party	Candidate	Votes	%	±%
Liberal	John Howard	39,867	60.5	+8.8
Labor	Noel Welsman	23,319	35.4	−6.6
Australia	Brian Johnson	1,527	2.3	−1.9
Independent	John Anlezark	1,195	1.8	−0.3
Total formal votes		65,908	98.4	
Informal votes		1,094	1.6	
Turnout		67,002	95.4	
Two-party-preferred result
Liberal	John Howard		62.8	+8.3
Labor	Noel Welsman		37.2	−8.3
Liberal hold		Swing	+8.3	

=== Berowra ===
This section is an excerpt from Electoral results for the Division of Berowra § 1975

1975 Australian federal election: Berowra
Party	Candidate	Votes	%	±%
Liberal	Harry Edwards	45,355	68.4	+5.9
Labor	Michael Ross	18,530	28.0	−4.2
Workers	Robert Howard	2,406	3.6	+3.6
Total formal votes		66,291	98.7	
Informal votes		876	1.3	
Turnout		67,167	97.4	
Two-party-preferred result
Liberal	Harry Edwards		71.3	+6.6
Labor	Michael Ross		28.7	−6.6
Liberal hold		Swing	+6.6	

=== Blaxland ===
This section is an excerpt from Electoral results for the Division of Blaxland § 1975

1975 Australian federal election: Blaxland
Party	Candidate	Votes	%	±%
Labor	Paul Keating	36,338	59.8	−7.0
Liberal	Joseph Touma	22,957	37.8	+9.1
Workers	Robert Symes	1,463	2.4	+2.4
Total formal votes		60,758	97.5	
Informal votes		1,584	2.5	
Turnout		62,342	96.2	
Two-party-preferred result
Labor	Paul Keating		60.3	−9.5
Liberal	Joseph Touma		39.7	+9.5
Labor hold		Swing	−9.5	

=== Bradfield ===
This section is an excerpt from Electoral results for the Division of Bradfield § 1975

1975 Australian federal election: Bradfield
Party	Candidate	Votes	%	±%
Liberal	David Connolly	53,135	77.9	+5.6
Labor	John Carmody	12,374	18.2	−5.4
Workers	Christopher Brown	2,662	3.9	+3.9
Total formal votes		68,171	98.9	
Informal votes		730	1.1	
Turnout		68,901	96.4	
Two-party-preferred result
Liberal	David Connolly		80.2	+6.3
Labor	John Carmody		19.8	−6.3
Liberal hold		Swing	+6.3	

=== Calare ===
This section is an excerpt from Electoral results for the Division of Calare § 1975

1975 Australian federal election: Calare
Party	Candidate	Votes	%	±%
Labor	Francis Hall	18,845	36.8	−6.3
National Country	Sandy Mackenzie	18,106	35.3	−20.2
Liberal	James Ashton	14,309	27.9	+27.9
Total formal votes		51,260	98.4	
Informal votes		813	1.6	
Turnout		52,073	95.9	
Two-party-preferred result
National Country	Sandy Mackenzie	30,413	59.3	+1.5
Labor	Francis Hall	20,847	40.7	−1.5
National Country hold		Swing	+1.5	

=== Chifley ===
This section is an excerpt from Electoral results for the Division of Chifley § 1975

1975 Australian federal election: Chifley
Party	Candidate	Votes	%	±%
Labor	John Armitage	48,767	61.8	−9.0
Liberal	Shirley Sookee	30,206	38.2	+11.8
Total formal votes		78,973	96.6	
Informal votes		2,773	3.4	
Turnout		81,746	95.9	
Labor hold		Swing	−10.7	

=== Cook ===
This section is an excerpt from Electoral results for the Division of Cook § 1975

1975 Australian federal election: Cook
Party	Candidate	Votes	%	±%
Liberal	Don Dobie	34,334	56.0	+7.3
Labor	Ray Thorburn	24,857	40.5	−8.0
Workers	Robert Schollbach	924	1.5	+1.5
Australia	Marjorie Gray	714	1.2	−1.4
Independent	Marc Aussie-Stone	376	0.6	+0.6
Independent	Philip O'Neill	105	0.2	+0.2
Total formal votes		61,310	98.6	
Informal votes		863	1.4	
Turnout		62,173	96.6	
Two-party-preferred result
Liberal	Don Dobie		57.8	+8.3
Labor	Ray Thorburn		42.2	−8.3
Liberal gain from Labor		Swing	+8.3	

=== Cowper ===
This section is an excerpt from Electoral results for the Division of Cowper § 1975

1975 Australian federal election: Cowper
Party	Candidate	Votes	%	±%
National Country	Ian Robinson	34,948	62.3	+6.5
Labor	Colin Clague	18,893	33.7	−8.7
Independent	John McLachlan	1,662	3.0	+3.0
Independent	John Holcombe	574	1.0	+1.0
Total formal votes		56,077	98.4	
Informal votes		654	1.6	
Turnout		56,731	95.4	
Two-party-preferred result
National Country	Ian Robinson		64.3	+7.7
Labor	Colin Clague		33.7	−7.7
National Country hold		Swing	+7.7	

=== Cunningham ===
This section is an excerpt from Electoral results for the Division of Cunningham § 1975

1975 Australian federal election: Cunningham
Party	Candidate	Votes	%	±%
Labor	Rex Connor	42,350	61.7	−8.2
Liberal	Peter Swan	24,972	36.4	+9.3
Workers	Peter Robertson	681	1.0	+1.0
Independent	Bernard Groben	611	0.9	+0.9
Total formal votes		68,614	98.0	
Informal votes		1,420	2.0	
Turnout		70,034	96.0	
Two-party-preferred result
Labor	Rex Connor		62.4	−9.4
Liberal	Peter Swan		37.6	+9.4
Labor hold		Swing	−9.4	

=== Darling ===
This section is an excerpt from Electoral results for the Division of Darling § 1975

1975 Australian federal election: Darling
Party	Candidate	Votes	%	±%
Labor	John FitzPatrick	25,579	56.8	−2.8
National Country	Walter Mitchell	18,874	41.9	+17.4
Independent	Walter Miller	603	1.3	+1.3
Total formal votes		45,056	98.3	
Informal votes		773	1.7	
Turnout		45,829	95.5	
Two-party-preferred result
Labor	John FitzPatrick		57.5	−6.3
National Country	Walter Mitchell		42.5	+6.3
Labor hold		Swing	−6.3	

=== Eden-Monaro ===
This section is an excerpt from Electoral results for the Division of Eden-Monaro § 1975

1975 Australian federal election: Eden-Monaro
Party	Candidate	Votes	%	±%
Labor	Bob Whan	26,669	43.5	−5.3
Liberal	Murray Sainsbury	21,661	35.3	+15.4
National Country	John Moore	12,008	19.6	−10.5
Independent	Frederick Dawson	993	1.6	+1.6
Total formal votes		61,331	98.7	
Informal votes		805	1.3	
Turnout		62,136	96.0	
Two-party-preferred result
Liberal	Murray Sainsbury	34,059	55.5	+55.5
Labor	Bob Whan	27,272	44.5	−5.6
Liberal gain from Labor		Swing	+5.6	

=== Evans ===
This section is an excerpt from Electoral results for the Division of Evans § 1975

1975 Australian federal election: Evans
Party	Candidate	Votes	%	±%
Liberal	John Abel	29,762	51.1	+7.5
Labor	Allan Mulder	27,357	46.9	−6.0
Australia	Graham Roll	489	0.8	−1.0
Independent	Warren Wilson	421	0.7	+0.7
Independent	Frederick Keoghan	254	0.4	+0.4
Total formal votes		58,283	97.9	
Informal votes		1,273	2.1	
Turnout		59,556	94.5	
Two-party-preferred result
Liberal	John Abel		52.0	+6.9
Labor	Allan Mulder		48.0	−6.9
Liberal gain from Labor		Swing	+6.9	

=== Farrer ===
This section is an excerpt from Electoral results for the Division of Farrer § 1975

1975 Australian federal election: Farrer
Party	Candidate	Votes	%	±%
Liberal	Wal Fife	29,570	49.4	−6.1
Labor	Patrick Brassil	18,100	30.4	−9.5
National Country	Kevin Bowtell	10,403	17.5	+17.5
Democratic Labor	Anthony Quinn	519	0.9	+0.9
Workers	Arthur Robinson	514	0.9	+0.9
Australia	Mike Donelan	413	0.7	−3.6
Total formal votes		59,519	98.6	
Informal votes		867	1.4	
Turnout		60,386	95.8	
Two-party-preferred result
Liberal	Wal Fife		66.4	+9.3
Labor	Patrick Brassil		33.6	−9.3
Liberal hold		Swing	+9.3	

=== Grayndler ===
This section is an excerpt from Electoral results for the Division of Grayndler § 1975

1975 Australian federal election: Grayndler
Party	Candidate	Votes	%	±%
Labor	Tony Whitlam	32,416	64.3	−7.9
Liberal	Jonathan Fowler	13,790	27.4	+4.7
Independent	Peter Dowd	1,713	3.4	+3.4
Independent	Douglas Spedding	1,596	3.2	+3.2
Independent	Graeme Shortland	865	1.7	+1.7
Total formal votes		50,380	96.8	
Informal votes		1,640	3.2	
Turnout		52,020	91.1	
Two-party-preferred result
Labor	Tony Whitlam		68.0	−7.7
Liberal	Jonathan Fowler		32.0	+7.7
Labor hold		Swing	−7.7	

=== Gwydir ===
This section is an excerpt from Electoral results for the Division of Gwydir § 1975

1975 Australian federal election: Gwydir
Party	Candidate	Votes	%	±%
National Country	Ralph Hunt	31,779	62.0	+4.0
Labor	Francis Bourke	18,686	36.5	−4.1
Independent	Norbert Hennessy	449	0.9	+0.9
Independent	William O'Donnell	331	0.6	+0.6
Total formal votes		51,245	98.3	
Informal votes		893	1.7	
Turnout		52,138	96.3	
Two-party-preferred result
National Country	Ralph Hunt		63.5	+4.9
Labor	Francis Bourke		36.5	−4.9
National Country hold		Swing	+4.9	

=== Hughes ===
This section is an excerpt from Electoral results for the Division of Hughes § 1975

1975 Australian federal election: Hughes
Party	Candidate	Votes	%	±%
Labor	Les Johnson	37,000	59.3	−7.0
Liberal	Robert Law	25,362	40.7	+9.3
Total formal votes		62,362	98.0	
Informal votes		1,302	2.0	
Turnout		63,664	96.7	
Labor hold		Swing	−8.4	

=== Hume ===
This section is an excerpt from Electoral results for the Division of Hume § 1975

1975 Australian federal election: Hume
Party	Candidate	Votes	%	±%
National Country	Stephen Lusher	27,746	57.0	+17.4
Labor	George Brenner	20,925	43.0	−4.4
Total formal votes		48,671	98.7	
Informal votes		665	1.3	
Turnout		49,336	96.4	
National Country hold		Swing	+6.3	

=== Hunter ===
This section is an excerpt from Electoral results for the Division of Hunter § 1975

1975 Australian federal election: Hunter
Party	Candidate	Votes	%	±%
Labor	Bert James	43,590	68.4	−4.2
Liberal	Stephen Walker	20,100	31.6	+6.7
Total formal votes		63,690	98.3	
Informal votes		1,114	1.7	
Turnout		64,804	96.6	
Labor hold		Swing	−5.6	

=== Kingsford Smith ===
This section is an excerpt from Electoral results for the Division of Kingsford Smith § 1975

1975 Australian federal election: Kingsford-Smith
Party	Candidate	Votes	%	±%
Labor	Lionel Bowen	35,381	59.1	−8.7
Liberal	Desmond Connors	22,955	38.4	+8.8
Independent	Nicholas Confos	1,499	2.5	+2.5
Total formal votes		59,835	97.6	
Informal votes		1,466	2.4	
Turnout		61,301	95.1	
Two-party-preferred result
Labor	Lionel Bowen		60.4	−9.0
Liberal	Desmond Connors		39.6	+9.0
Labor hold		Swing	−9.0	

=== Lang ===
This section is an excerpt from Electoral results for the Division of Lang § 1975

1975 Australian federal election: Lang
Party	Candidate	Votes	%	±%
Labor	Frank Stewart	31,960	55.1	−9.6
Liberal	Donald Carruthers	22,793	39.3	+8.5
Independent	Douglas Morgan	1,402	2.4	+2.4
Independent	Marc Aussie-Stone	960	1.7	+1.7
Independent	John Stewart	871	1.5	+1.5
Total formal votes		57,986	97.5	
Informal votes		1,477	2.5	
Turnout		59,463	94.5	
Two-party-preferred result
Labor	Frank Stewart		57.4	−9.3
Liberal	Donald Carruthers		42.6	+9.3
Labor hold		Swing	−9.3	

=== Lowe ===
This section is an excerpt from Electoral results for the Division of Lowe § 1975

1975 Australian federal election: Lowe
Party	Candidate	Votes	%	±%
Liberal	William McMahon	32,908	57.3	+5.8
Labor	Robert Hyde	22,299	38.8	−4.9
Australia	Clifford Bros	1,039	1.8	−0.1
Workers	Andris Kichno	626	1.1	+1.1
Independent	Ben Doig	626	0.6	+0.6
Independent	Bent Poulsen	168	0.3	+0.3
Total formal votes		57,402	97.9	
Informal votes		1,231	2.1	
Turnout		58,633	94.4	
Two-party-preferred result
Liberal	William McMahon		59.0	+5.3
Labor	Robert Hyde		41.0	−5.3
Liberal hold		Swing	+5.3	

=== Lyne ===
This section is an excerpt from Electoral results for the Division of Lyne § 1975

1975 Australian federal election: Lyne
Party	Candidate	Votes	%	±%
National Country	Philip Lucock	35,554	60.0	+0.2
Labor	Bruce Langford	18,377	31.0	−5.5
Independent	Peter Simpson	5,362	9.0	+9.0
Total formal votes		59,293	98.8	
Informal votes		720	1.2	
Turnout		60,013	97.1	
Two-party-preferred result
National Country	Philip Lucock		64.5	+2.7
Labor	Bruce Langford		35.5	−2.7
National Country hold		Swing	+2.7	

=== Macarthur ===
This section is an excerpt from Electoral results for the Division of Macarthur § 1975

1975 Australian federal election: Macarthur
Party	Candidate	Votes	%	±%
Liberal	Michael Baume	41,341	51.3	+6.4
Labor	John Kerin	36,247	45.0	−8.2
Workers	Ramon Barros	2,213	2.7	+2.7
Australia	Susan Healy	557	0.7	−1.3
Independent	Barry Watkinson	280	0.3	+0.3
Total formal votes		80,638	98.2	
Informal votes		1,463	1.8	
Turnout		82,101	95.9	
Two-party-preferred result
Liberal	Michael Baume		54.1	+8.5
Labor	John Kerin		45.9	−8.5
Liberal gain from Labor		Swing	+8.5	

=== Mackellar ===
This section is an excerpt from Electoral results for the Division of Mackellar § 1975

1975 Australian federal election: Mackellar
Party	Candidate	Votes	%	±%
Liberal	Bill Wentworth	43,536	61.4	+6.2
Labor	Kevin Mason	22,330	31.5	−8.8
Workers	Barry Bracken	3,576	5.0	+5.0
Independent	Jennifer Sheehan	1,408	2.0	+2.0
Total formal votes		70,850	98.3	
Informal votes		1,189	1.7	
Turnout		72,039	95.0	
Two-party-preferred result
Liberal	Bill Wentworth		65.6	+8.6
Labor	Kevin Mason		34.4	−8.6
Liberal hold		Swing	+8.6	

=== Macquarie ===
This section is an excerpt from Electoral results for the Division of Macquarie § 1975

1975 Australian federal election: Macquarie
Party	Candidate	Votes	%	±%
Liberal	Reg Gillard	37,739	50.2	+14.9
Labor	Ross Free	35,131	46.7	−9.4
Workers	Murray Busch	1,392	1.9	+1.9
Independent	Norman Lee	524	0.7	+0.7
Independent	Ian Perry	451	0.6	+0.6
Total formal votes		75,237	98.2	
Informal votes		1,390	1.8	
Turnout		76,627	95.5	
Two-party-preferred result
Liberal	Reg Gillard		51.6	+10.3
Labor	Ross Free		48.4	−10.3
Liberal gain from Labor		Swing	+10.3	

=== Mitchell ===
This section is an excerpt from Electoral results for the Division of Mitchell § 1975

1975 Australian federal election: Mitchell
Party	Candidate	Votes	%	±%
Liberal	Alan Cadman	50,875	62.0	+12.0
Labor	David Savage	28,970	35.3	−11.6
Workers	Duncan Yuille	999	1.2	+1.2
Australia	Alexander Munro	705	0.9	−1.6
Independent	Dimitar Mikusalev	246	0.3	+0.3
Independent	Ivor F	225	0.3	+0.3
Total formal votes		82,020	98.1	
Informal votes		1,563	1.9	
Turnout		83,583	95.7	
Two-party-preferred result
Liberal	Alan Cadman		64.0	+12.5
Labor	David Savage		36.0	−12.5
Liberal hold		Swing	+12.5	

=== New England ===
This section is an excerpt from Electoral results for the Division of New England § 1975

1975 Australian federal election: New England
Party	Candidate	Votes	%	±%
National Country	Ian Sinclair	36,971	62.3	+5.3
Labor	John Shanahan	19,980	33.7	−6.5
Independent	Geoffrey Anderson	2,395	4.0	+4.0
Total formal votes		59,346	98.5	
Informal votes		881	1.5	
Turnout		60,227	95.1	
Two-party-preferred result
National Country	Ian Sinclair		63.8	+5.7
Labor	John Shanahan		36.2	−5.7
National Country hold		Swing	+5.7	

=== Newcastle ===
This section is an excerpt from Electoral results for the Division of Newcastle1975

1975 Australian federal election: Newcastle
Party	Candidate	Votes	%	±%
Labor	Charles Jones	34,170	61.9	−8.1
Liberal	Arthur Thomas	20,045	36.3	+9.2
Communist	David Ross	1,027	1.9	+1.9
Total formal votes		55,242	98.0	
Informal votes		1,140	2.0	
Turnout		56,382	96.2	
Two-party-preferred result
Labor	Charles Jones		63.6	−8.1
Liberal	Arthur Thomas		36.4	+8.1
Labor hold		Swing	−8.1	

=== North Sydney ===
This section is an excerpt from Electoral results for the Division of North Sydney § 1975

1975 Australian federal election: North Sydney
Party	Candidate	Votes	%	±%
Liberal	Bill Graham	35,009	63.8	+6.9
Labor	Patrick Healy	17,959	32.7	−4.8
Workers	Peter Sawyer	1,564	2.8	+2.8
Independent	Romualds Kemps	362	0.7	+0.1
Total formal votes		54,894	98.3	
Informal votes		944	1.7	
Turnout		55,838	93.3	
Two-party-preferred result
Liberal	Bill Graham		66.4	+7.5
Labor	Patrick Healy		33.6	−7.5
Liberal hold		Swing	+7.5	

=== Parramatta ===
This section is an excerpt from Electoral results for the Division of Parramatta § 1975

1975 Australian federal election: Parramatta
Party	Candidate	Votes	%	±%
Liberal	Philip Ruddock	40,761	56.7	+7.4
Labor	John Brown	29,055	40.4	−6.4
Workers	Malcolm McKinnon	1,307	1.8	+1.8
Australia	Astrid O'Neill	801	1.1	−1.1
Total formal votes		71,924	98.6	
Informal votes		994	1.4	
Turnout		72,918	95.9	
Two-party-preferred result
Liberal	Philip Ruddock		59.2	+7.9
Labor	John Brown		40.8	−7.9
Liberal hold		Swing	+7.9	

=== Paterson ===
This section is an excerpt from Electoral results for the Division of Paterson § 1975

1975 Australian federal election: Paterson
Party	Candidate	Votes	%	±%
National Country	Frank O'Keefe	30,985	55.6	+6.3
Labor	Noel Unicomb	23,397	42.0	−7.0
Independent	Barnard Hassett	861	1.5	+1.5
Independent	Marc Aussie-Stone	505	0.9	+0.9
Total formal votes		55,748	98.6	
Informal votes		780	1.4	
Turnout		56,528	96.0	
Two-party-preferred result
National Country	Frank O'Keefe		57.3	+7.0
Labor	Noel Unicomb		42.7	−7.0
National Country hold		Swing	+7.0	

=== Phillip ===
This section is an excerpt from Electoral results for the Division of Phillip § 1975

1975 Australian federal election: Phillip
Party	Candidate	Votes	%	±%
Liberal	Jack Birney	31,869	50.6	+6.5
Labor	Joe Riordan	29,525	46.9	−5.8
Workers	Michael Clarke	882	1.4	+1.4
Australia	Marie Morris	675	1.1	−1.2
Total formal votes		62,951	98.1	
Informal votes		1,204	1.9	
Turnout		64,155	92.7	
Two-party-preferred result
Liberal	Jack Birney		52.6	+7.1
Labor	Joe Riordan		47.4	−7.1
Liberal gain from Labor		Swing	+7.1	

=== Prospect ===
This section is an excerpt from Electoral results for the Division of Prospect § 1975

1975 Australian federal election: Prospect
Party	Candidate	Votes	%	±%
Labor	Dick Klugman	38,487	57.0	−10.4
Liberal	Donald MacDonald	27,695	41.1	+11.1
Australia	Geoffrey Thomas	1,284	1.9	−0.7
Total formal votes		67,466	97.1	
Informal votes		1,983	2.9	
Turnout		69,449	94.9	
Two-party-preferred result
Labor	Dick Klugman		58.1	−10.9
Liberal	Donald MacDonald		41.9	+10.9
Labor hold		Swing	−10.9	

=== Reid ===
This section is an excerpt from Electoral results for the Division of Reid § 1975

1975 Australian federal election: Reid
Party	Candidate	Votes	%	±%
Labor	Tom Uren	33,208	58.9	−9.0
Liberal	Terence Shanahan	20,414	36.2	+6.5
Workers	Kevin McKenna	2,742	4.9	+4.9
Total formal votes		56,364	97.3	
Informal votes		1,554	2.7	
Turnout		57,918	95.6	
Two-party-preferred result
Labor	Tom Uren		59.7	−9.6
Liberal	Terence Shanahan		40.3	+9.6
Labor hold		Swing	−9.6	

=== Richmond ===
This section is an excerpt from Electoral results for the Division of Richmond § 1975

1975 Australian federal election: Richmond
Party	Candidate	Votes	%	±%
National Country	Doug Anthony	37,899	64.1	+1.9
Labor	Archibald Johnston	18,766	31.8	−2.3
Australia	Bernard Walrut	1,233	2.1	−1.6
Independent	Ethel Adams	1,188	2.0	+2.0
Total formal votes		59,086	98.9	
Informal votes		663	1.1	
Turnout		59,749	95.6	
Two-party-preferred result
National Country	Doug Anthony		66.4	+2.7
Labor	Archibald Johnston		33.6	−2.7
National Country hold		Swing	+2.7	

=== Riverina ===
This section is an excerpt from Electoral results for the Division of Riverina § 1975

1975 Australian federal election: Riverina
Party	Candidate	Votes	%	±%
National Country	John Sullivan	30,851	61.8	+28.6
Labor	John Pollard	19,053	38.2	−9.6
Total formal votes		49,904	98.2	
Informal votes		901	1.8	
Turnout		50,805	95.0	
National Country hold		Swing	+11.0	

=== Robertson ===
This section is an excerpt from Electoral results for the Division of Robertson § 1975

1975 Australian federal election: Robertson
Party	Candidate	Votes	%	±%
Labor	Barry Cohen	41,201	49.9	−7.7
Liberal	Hugh Chalmers	39,331	47.6	+7.9
Independent	Phillip Smith	1,166	1.4	+1.4
Workers	Raymond Louis	868	1.1	+1.1
Total formal votes		82,566	98.4	
Informal votes		1,369	1.6	
Turnout		83,935	96.2	
Two-party-preferred result
Labor	Barry Cohen		51.0	−7.6
Liberal	Hugh Chalmers		49.0	+7.6
Labor hold		Swing	−7.6	

=== Shortland ===
This section is an excerpt from Electoral results for the Division of Shortland § 1975

1975 Australian federal election: Shortland
Party	Candidate	Votes	%	±%
Labor	Peter Morris	34,182	56.9	−6.6
Liberal	Richard Bevan	24,215	40.3	+9.9
Independent	Barbara Timmins	872	1.5	+1.5
Independent	Lionel Lambkin	800	1.3	+1.3
Total formal votes		60,069	98.7	
Informal votes		790	1.3	
Turnout		60,859	96.2	
Two-party-preferred result
Labor	Peter Morris		58.3	−8.0
Liberal	Richard Bevan		41.7	+8.0
Labor hold		Swing	−8.0	

=== St George ===
This section is an excerpt from Electoral results for the Division of St George § 1975

1975 Australian federal election: St George
Party	Candidate	Votes	%	±%
Liberal	Maurice Neil	28,371	49.0	+5.4
Labor	Bill Morrison	28,203	48.7	−6.3
Workers	Keith Gleeson	1,338	2.3	+2.3
Total formal votes		57,912	98.3	
Informal votes		1,006	1.7	
Turnout		58,918	96.2	
Two-party-preferred result
Liberal	Maurice Neil	28,984	50.0	+5.8
Labor	Bill Morrison	28,928	50.0	−5.8
Liberal gain from Labor		Swing	+5.8	

=== Sydney ===
This section is an excerpt from Electoral results for the Division of Sydney § 1975

1975 Australian federal election: Sydney
Party	Candidate	Votes	%	±%
Labor	Les McMahon	31,493	66.1	−5.8
Liberal	Janis Wallace	12,268	25.8	+6.0
Communist	Laurie Aarons	2,667	5.6	+5.6
Workers	Merilyn Giesekam	644	1.4	+1.4
Independent	Roderick MacNeil	537	1.1	+1.1
Total formal votes		47,609	96.9	
Informal votes		1,539	3.1	
Turnout		49,148	88.4	
Two-party-preferred result
Labor	Les McMahon		72.1	−5.9
Liberal	Janis Wallace		27.9	+5.9
Labor hold		Swing	−5.9	

=== Warringah ===
This section is an excerpt from Electoral results for the Division of Warringah § 1975

1975 Australian federal election: Warringah
Party	Candidate	Votes	%	±%
Liberal	Michael MacKellar	40,662	68.5	+7.9
Labor	Allan Hughes	17,990	30.3	−5.0
Independent	Eric Riches	746	1.3	+1.3
Total formal votes		59,398	98.5	
Informal votes		928	1.5	
Turnout		60,326	94.7	
Two-party-preferred result
Liberal	Michael MacKellar		69.2	+6.9
Labor	Allan Hughes		30.8	−6.9
Liberal hold		Swing	+6.9	

=== Wentworth ===
This section is an excerpt from Electoral results for the Division of Wentworth § 1975

1975 Australian federal election: Wentworth
Party	Candidate	Votes	%	±%
Liberal	Bob Ellicott	34,537	65.7	+3.9
Labor	Mairi Petersen	15,224	28.9	−4.7
Workers	John Curvers	2,058	3.9	+3.9
Australia	Joseph Zingarelli	788	1.5	−3.1
Total formal votes		52,607	98.0	
Informal votes		1,059	2.0	
Turnout		53,666	92.4	
Two-party-preferred result
Liberal	Bob Ellicott		69.6	+6.0
Labor	Mairi Petersen		30.4	−6.0
Liberal hold		Swing	+6.0	

=== Werriwa ===
This section is an excerpt from Electoral results for the Division of Werriwa § 1975

1975 Australian federal election: Werriwa
Party	Candidate	Votes	%	±%
Labor	Gough Whitlam	44,356	59.4	−9.6
Liberal	William Sadler	27,724	37.1	+7.9
Independent	Marc Aussie-Stone	1,178	1.6	+1.6
Workers	Ronald Watson	578	0.8	+0.8
Independent	Maurice Sharp	271	0.4	+0.4
Independent	Fredrick Keep	270	0.4	+0.4
Independent	Ross May	263	0.4	+0.4
Total formal votes		74,640	97.1	
Informal votes		2,266	2.9	
Turnout		76,906	95.4	
Two-party-preferred result
Labor	Gough Whitlam		61.4	−8.5
Liberal	William Sadler		38.6	+8.5
Labor hold		Swing	−8.5	

== Victoria ==
1975 Australian federal election (Victoria)
← 1974	13 December 1975	1977 →

All 34 Victorian seats in the House of Representatives 17 seats needed for a majority
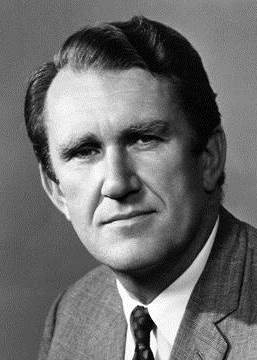

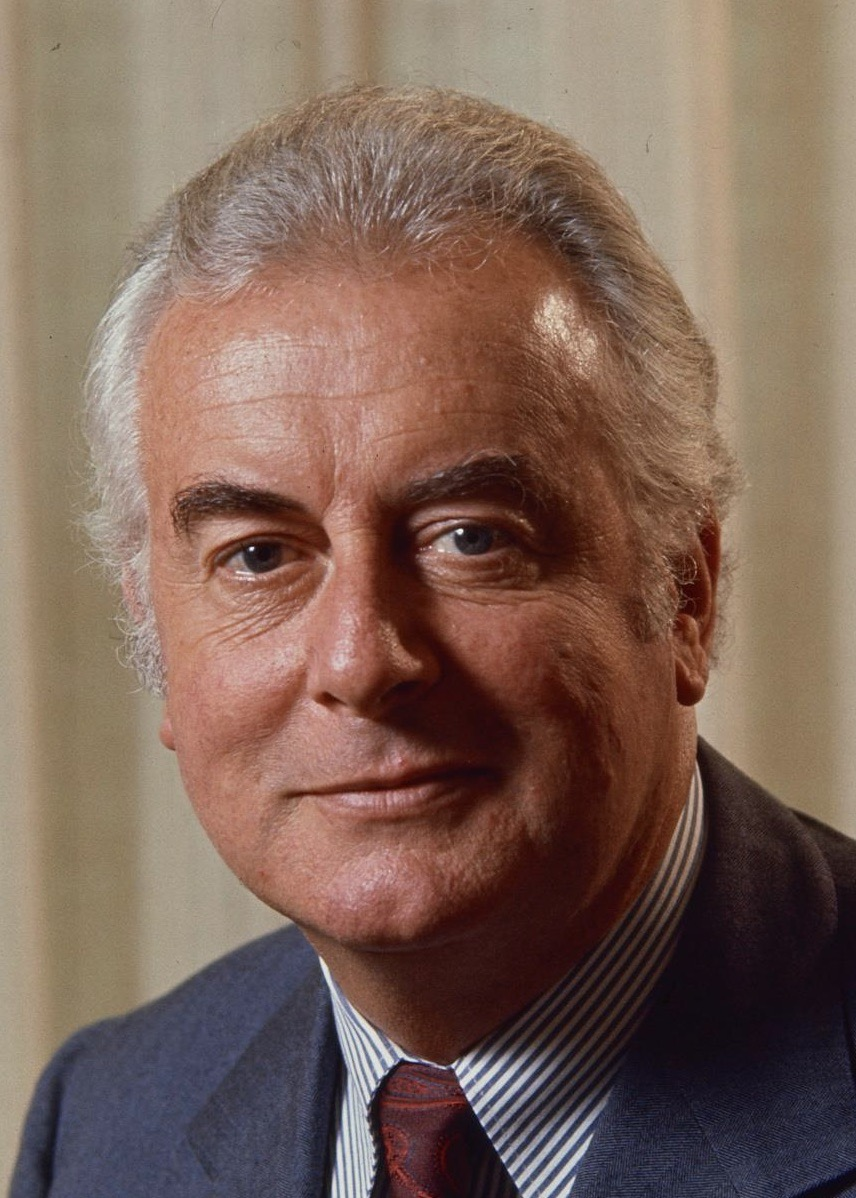
	First party	Second party
Leader	Malcolm Fraser	Gough Whitlam
Party	Coalition	Labor
Seats before	18	16
Seats won	24	10
Seat change	▲6	▼6
Popular vote	1,071,334	882,842
Percentage	51.2%	42.1%
Swing	▲7.3pp	▼5.8pp
TPP	56.2%	43.8%
TPP swing	▲6.8pp	▼6.8pp

=== Balaclava ===
This section is an excerpt from Electoral results for the Division of Balaclava § 1975

1975 Australian federal election: Balaclava
Party	Candidate	Votes	%	±%
Liberal	Ian Macphee	32,581	58.8	+7.4
Labor	Martin Ryan	18,203	32.9	−8.4
Australia	John Howe	2,375	4.3	+1.6
Democratic Labor	Peter Lawlor	2,214	4.0	−0.7
Total formal votes		55,373	98.0	
Informal votes		1,122	2.0	
Turnout		56,495	95.1	
Two-party-preferred result
Liberal	Ian Macphee		63.7	+7.0
Labor	Martin Ryan		36.3	−7.0
Liberal hold		Swing	+7.0	

=== Ballaarat ===
This section is an excerpt from Electoral results for the Division of Ballarat § 1975

1975 Australian federal election: Ballaarat
Party	Candidate	Votes	%	±%
Liberal	Jim Short	29,708	50.9	+5.0
Labor	David Williams	22,844	39.1	−4.6
Democratic Labor	Bryan Hanrahan	4,219	7.2	−0.3
Independent	Glendon Ludbrook	1,625	2.8	+2.8
Total formal votes		58,396	98.3	
Informal votes		1,011	1.7	
Turnout		59,407	97.0	
Two-party-preferred result
Liberal	Jim Short		58.9	+4.1
Labor	David Williams		41.1	−4.1
Liberal hold		Swing	+4.1	

=== Batman ===
This section is an excerpt from Electoral results for the Division of Batman § 1975

1975 Australian federal election: Batman
Party	Candidate	Votes	%	±%
Labor	Horrie Garrick	30,570	53.8	−3.3
Liberal	Michael Galli	22,077	38.8	+7.3
Democratic Labor	Eileen Doyle	4,189	7.4	−1.4
Total formal votes		56,836	97.7	
Informal votes		1,355	2.3	
Turnout		58,191	94.7	
Two-party-preferred result
Labor	Horrie Garrick		54.4	−6.0
Liberal	Michael Galli		45.6	+6.0
Labor hold		Swing	−6.0	

=== Bendigo ===
This section is an excerpt from Electoral results for the Division of Bendigo § 1975

1975 Australian federal election: Bendigo
Party	Candidate	Votes	%	±%
Liberal	John Bourchier	28,594	48.3	+9.7
Labor	Stewart Anderson	25,160	42.5	−5.3
Democratic Labor	Paul Brennan	2,663	4.5	−0.8
National Country	Henry O'Halloran	2,563	4.3	+4.3
Independent	Leslie Irlam	263	0.4	+0.4
Total formal votes		59,243	98.6	
Informal votes		812	1.4	
Turnout		60,055	96.4	
Two-party-preferred result
Liberal	John Bourchier		56.7	+5.9
Labor	Stewart Anderson		45.3	−5.9
Liberal hold		Swing	+5.9	

=== Bruce ===
This section is an excerpt from Electoral results for the Division of Bruce § 1975

1975 Australian federal election: Bruce
Party	Candidate	Votes	%	±%
Liberal	Billy Snedden	44,314	57.2	+8.7
Labor	Graeme Bond	28,577	36.9	−6.4
Democratic Labor	John Lloyd	2,347	3.0	−1.5
Australia	Iris Pederick	1,748	2.3	−0.5
Independent	Diana Martin	469	0.6	+0.6
Total formal votes		77,455	98.4	
Informal votes		1,232	1.6	
Turnout		78,687	96.7	
Two-party-preferred result
Liberal	Billy Snedden		61.1	+8.7
Labor	Graeme Bond		38.9	−8.7
Liberal hold		Swing	+8.7	

=== Burke ===
This section is an excerpt from Electoral results for the Division of Burke (1969–2004) § 1975

1975 Australian federal election: Burke
Party	Candidate	Votes	%	±%
Labor	Keith Johnson	45,634	54.2	−7.0
Liberal	Claus Salger	31,103	37.0	+9.1
Democratic Labor	Colin Walsh	4,442	5.3	−0.3
Independent	Michael Dupla	2,949	3.5	+3.5
Total formal votes		84,128	97.3	
Informal votes		2,318	2.7	
Turnout		86,446	96.4	
Two-party-preferred result
Labor	Keith Johnson		57.0	−8.8
Liberal	Claus Salger		43.0	+8.8
Labor hold		Swing	−8.8	

=== Casey ===
This section is an excerpt from Electoral results for the Division of Casey § 1975

1975 Australian federal election: Casey
Party	Candidate	Votes	%	±%
Liberal	Peter Falconer	39,597	53.0	+9.7
Labor	Race Mathews	30,611	40.9	−8.5
Democratic Labor	John McKenna	2,289	3.1	−0.4
Australia	Murray Deerbon	1,340	1.8	−1.9
Independent	Marc Aussie-Stone	923	1.2	+1.2
Total formal votes		74,760	98.5	
Informal votes		1,113	1.5	
Turnout		75,873	96.6	
Two-party-preferred result
Liberal	Peter Falconer		57.5	+9.0
Labor	Race Mathews		42.5	−9.0
Liberal gain from Labor		Swing	+9.0	

=== Chisholm ===
This section is an excerpt from Electoral results for the Division of Chisholm § 1975

1975 Australian federal election: Chisholm
Party	Candidate	Votes	%	±%
Liberal	Tony Staley	31,477	57.0	+6.5
Labor	Richard Campbell	19,712	35.7	−5.0
Democratic Labor	Joe Stanley	2,787	5.0	−0.3
Australia	Richard Franklin	1,236	2.2	−1.3
Total formal votes		55,212	98.5	
Informal votes		826	1.5	
Turnout		56,038	95.9	
Two-party-preferred result
Liberal	Tony Staley		62.4	+5.7
Labor	Richard Campbell		37.6	−5.7
Liberal hold		Swing	+5.7	

=== Corangamite ===
This section is an excerpt from Electoral results for the Division of Corangamite § 1975

1975 Australian federal election: Corangamite
Party	Candidate	Votes	%	±%
Liberal	Tony Street	38,253	65.0	+6.6
Labor	Shirley Ambrose	17,433	29.6	−4.6
Democratic Labor	Francis O'Brien	2,360	4.0	−1.4
Australia	Ian Slater	538	0.9	−1.1
Independent	Brian Costin	305	0.5	+0.5
Total formal votes		58,889	98.7	
Informal votes		800	1.3	
Turnout		59,689	97.5	
Two-party-preferred result
Liberal	Tony Street		69.2	+5.7
Labor	Shirley Ambrose		30.8	−5.7
Liberal hold		Swing	+5.7	

=== Corio ===
This section is an excerpt from Electoral results for the Division of Corio § 1975

1975 Australian federal election: Corio
Party	Candidate	Votes	%	±%
Labor	Gordon Scholes	30,688	49.0	−5.7
Liberal	Gordon Hall	28,907	46.2	+7.0
Democratic Labor	John Timberlake	2,425	3.9	−0.7
Australia	Guenter Sahr	604	1.0	−0.4
Total formal votes		62,624	98.0	
Informal votes		1,298	2.0	
Turnout		63,922	95.7	
Two-party-preferred result
Labor	Gordon Scholes	31,322	50.0	−6.0
Liberal	Gordon Hall	31,302	50.0	+6.0
Labor hold		Swing	−6.0	

=== Deakin ===
This section is an excerpt from Electoral results for the Division of Deakin § 1975

1975 Australian federal election: Deakin
Party	Candidate	Votes	%	±%
Liberal	Alan Jarman	33,935	54.5	+8.0
Labor	Gavan Oakley	23,607	37.9	−6.2
Democratic Labor	Jim Brosnan	2,626	4.2	−0.4
Australia	William Inglis	1,196	1.9	−0.8
Independent	Walter Williams	928	1.5	+1.5
Total formal votes		62,292	98.5	
Informal votes		925	1.5	
Turnout		63,217	96.5	
Two-party-preferred result
Liberal	Alan Jarman		59.9	+7.6
Labor	Gavan Oakley		40.1	−7.6
Liberal hold		Swing	+7.6	

=== Diamond Valley ===
This section is an excerpt from Electoral results for the Division of Diamond Valley § 1975

1975 Australian federal election: Diamond Valley
Party	Candidate	Votes	%	±%
Liberal	Neil Brown	47,975	55.0	+10.2
Labor	David McKenzie	34,252	39.3	−7.8
Democratic Labor	Christopher Curtis	2,691	3.1	−2.2
Australia	John Franceschini	1,308	1.5	−0.9
Independent	Marc Aussie-Stone	778	0.9	+0.9
Independent	John Duncan	198	0.2	+0.2
Total formal votes		87,202	98.6	
Informal votes		1,202	1.4	
Turnout		88,404	96.2	
Two-party-preferred result
Liberal	Neil Brown		59.1	+9.8
Labor	David McKenzie		40.9	−9.8
Liberal gain from Labor		Swing	+9.8	

=== Flinders ===
This section is an excerpt from Electoral results for the Division of Flinders § 1975

1975 Australian federal election: Flinders
Party	Candidate	Votes	%	±%
Liberal	Phillip Lynch	46,155	57.5	+7.2
Labor	Geoffrey Eastwood	30,251	37.7	−7.8
Australia	Peter Dalton	1,851	2.3	+0.9
Democratic Labor	John Glynn	1,654	2.1	+0.1
Independent	Stanley Hillman	375	0.5	+0.5
Total formal votes		80,286	98.5	
Informal votes		1,196	1.5	
Turnout		81,482	95.3	
Two-party-preferred result
Liberal	Phillip Lynch		60.2	+7.2
Labor	Geoffrey Eastwood		39.8	−7.2
Liberal hold		Swing	+7.2	

=== Gellibrand ===
This section is an excerpt from Electoral results for the Division of Gellibrand § 1975

1975 Australian federal election: Gellibrand
Party	Candidate	Votes	%	±%
Labor	Ralph Willis	32,669	61.4	−4.5
Liberal	Iris Williams	15,779	29.7	+7.2
Democratic Labor	Bert Bailey	4,769	9.0	−0.3
Total formal votes		53,217	97.1	
Informal votes		1,591	2.9	
Turnout		54,808	95.5	
Two-party-preferred result
Labor	Ralph Willis		62.2	−5.9
Liberal	Iris Williams		37.8	+5.9
Labor hold		Swing	−5.9	

=== Gippsland ===
This section is an excerpt from Electoral results for the Division of Gippsland § 1975

1975 Australian federal election: Gippsland
Party	Candidate	Votes	%	±%
National Country	Peter Nixon	36,806	64.7	+5.2
Labor	Peter Turner	16,274	28.6	−3.4
Democratic Labor	Robert McMahon	3,849	6.8	+2.2
Total formal votes		56,929	98.2	
Informal votes		1,018	1.8	
Turnout		57,947	95.9	
Two-party-preferred result
National Country	Peter Nixon		70.9	+5.1
Labor	Peter Turner		29.1	−5.1
National Country hold		Swing	+5.1	

=== Henty ===
This section is an excerpt from Electoral results for the Division of Henty § 1975

1975 Australian federal election: Henty
Party	Candidate	Votes	%	±%
Liberal	Ken Aldred	29,621	51.5	+7.5
Labor	Joan Child	25,158	43.8	−5.8
Democratic Labor	Terry Farrell	1,989	3.5	−0.7
Australia	Michael Hughes	536	0.9	+0.9
Independent	Marc Aussie-Stone	190	0.3	+0.3
Total formal votes		57,494	98.2	
Informal votes		1,064	1.8	
Turnout		58,558	95.9	
Two-party-preferred result
Liberal	Ken Aldred		55.2	+6.7
Labor	Joan Child		44.8	−6.7
Liberal gain from Labor		Swing	+6.7	

=== Higgins ===
This section is an excerpt from Electoral results for the Division of Higgins § 1975

1975 Australian federal election: Higgins
Party	Candidate	Votes	%	±%
Liberal	Roger Shipton	35,577	60.7	+2.1
Labor	Andrew Homer	19,134	32.6	−2.3
Democratic Labor	John Cotter	2,833	4.8	+1.3
Australia	Rafe Slaney	1,091	1.9	−1.2
Total formal votes		58,635	98.3	
Informal votes		1,027	1.7	
Turnout		59,662	94.0	
Two-party-preferred result
Liberal	Roger Shipton		64.9	+1.9
Labor	Andrew Homer		35.1	−1.9
Liberal hold		Swing	+1.9	

=== Holt ===
This section is an excerpt from Electoral results for the Division of Holt § 1975

1975 Australian federal election: Holt
Party	Candidate	Votes	%	±%
Liberal	William Yates	39,436	48.2	+9.0
Labor	Max Oldmeadow	38,069	46.5	−7.8
Democratic Labor	Robert Fidler	4,343	5.3	+1.9
Total formal votes		81,848	97.6	
Informal votes		2,049	2.4	
Turnout		83,897	95.9	
Two-party-preferred result
Liberal	William Yates	42,241	51.6	+8.5
Labor	Max Oldmeadow	39,607	48.4	−8.5
Liberal gain from Labor		Swing	+8.5	

=== Hotham ===
This section is an excerpt from Electoral results for the Division of Hotham § 1975

1975 Australian federal election: Hotham
Party	Candidate	Votes	%	±%
Liberal	Don Chipp	32,278	54.3	+6.1
Labor	Tony Ross	24,623	41.5	−4.9
Democratic Labor	Frank Gaffy	1,948	3.3	−0.4
Independent	John Murray	555	0.9	+0.6
Total formal votes		59,404	98.4	
Informal votes		2979	1.6	
Turnout		60,383	95.9	
Two-party-preferred result
Liberal	Don Chipp		57.7	+5.4
Labor	Tony Ross		42.3	−5.4
Liberal hold		Swing	+5.4	

=== Indi ===
This section is an excerpt from Electoral results for the Division of Indi § 1975

1975 Australian federal election: Indi
Party	Candidate	Votes	%	±%
National Country	Mac Holten	33,171	61.5	+5.2
Labor	Alan Bell	17,359	32.2	−4.3
Democratic Labor	Christopher Cody	3,389	6.3	+0.6
Total formal votes		53,919	98.3	
Informal votes		922	1.7	
Turnout		54,841	96.8	
Two-party-preferred result
National Country	Mac Holten		67.2	+5.0
Labor	Alan Bell		32.8	−5.0
National Country hold		Swing	+5.0	

=== Isaacs ===
This section is an excerpt from Electoral results for the Division of Isaacs § 1975

1975 Australian federal election: Isaacs
Party	Candidate	Votes	%	±%
Liberal	David Hamer	30,646	53.2	+8.8
Labor	Gareth Clayton	23,506	40.8	−5.3
Democratic Labor	Ralph Cleary	1,917	3.3	−0.5
Australia	Eldon Simmons	805	1.4	−1.1
Independent	Marc Aussie-Stone	719	1.2	+1.2
Total formal votes		57,593	98.3	
Informal votes		975	1.7	
Turnout		58,568	95.7	
Two-party-preferred result
Liberal	David Hamer		56.9	+7.5
Labor	Gareth Clayton		43.1	−7.5
Liberal gain from Labor		Swing	+7.5	

=== Kooyong ===
This section is an excerpt from Electoral results for the Division of Kooyong § 1975

1975 Australian federal election: Kooyong
Party	Candidate	Votes	%	±%
Liberal	Andrew Peacock	35,809	61.6	+6.7
Labor	John Wilkinson	17,620	30.3	−3.9
Democratic Labor	Francis Duffy	3,411	5.9	+0.2
Australia	John Gare	1,283	2.2	−0.8
Total formal votes		58,123	98.5	
Informal votes		907	1.5	
Turnout		59,030	95.5	
Two-party-preferred result
Liberal	Andrew Peacock		67.9	+5.1
Labor	John Wilkinson		32.1	−5.1
Liberal hold		Swing	+5.1	

=== La Trobe ===
This section is an excerpt from Electoral results for the Division of La Trobe § 1975

1975 Australian federal election: La Trobe
Party	Candidate	Votes	%	±%
Liberal	Marshall Baillieu	41,276	50.5	+8.5
Labor	Tony Lamb	35,504	43.5	−9.4
Democratic Labor	James Penna	1,889	2.3	−0.4
Independent	Cornelus Hellema	1,837	2.2	+2.2
Australia	Don Walters	1,029	1.3	−0.7
Independent	Ronald Neilsen	169	0.2	+0.2
Total formal votes		18,704	98.0	
Informal votes		1,647	2.0	
Turnout		83,351	95.0	
Two-party-preferred result
Liberal	Marshall Baillieu		54.3	+8.9
Labor	Tony Lamb		45.7	−8.9
Liberal gain from Labor		Swing	−3.5	

=== Lalor ===
This section is an excerpt from Electoral results for the Division of Lalor § 1975

1975 Australian federal election: Lalor
Party	Candidate	Votes	%	±%
Labor	Jim Cairns	43,426	59.3	−5.3
Liberal	Francis Purcell	24,467	33.4	+7.6
Democratic Labor	Denis Bilston	5,289	7.2	−0.7
Total formal votes		73,182	96.6	
Informal votes		2,543	3.4	
Turnout		75,725	94.8	
Two-party-preferred result
Labor	Jim Cairns		60.9	−6.4
Liberal	Francis Purcell		39.1	+6.4
Labor hold		Swing	−6.4	

=== Mallee ===
This section is an excerpt from Electoral results for the Division of Mallee § 1975

1975 Australian federal election: Mallee
Party	Candidate	Votes	%	±%
National Country	Peter Fisher	33,663	70.1	+7.0
Labor	Ronald Davies	11,256	23.4	−3.7
Democratic Labor	Stanley Croughan	3,116	6.5	−1.1
Total formal votes		48,035	98.2	
Informal votes		866	1.8	
Turnout		48,901	96.1	
Two-party-preferred result
National Country	Peter Fisher		75.2	+4.2
Labor	Ronald Davies		24.8	−4.2
National Country hold		Swing	+4.2	

=== Maribyrnong ===
This section is an excerpt from Electoral results for the Division of Maribyrnong § 1975

1975 Australian federal election: Maribyrnong
Party	Candidate	Votes	%	±%
Labor	Moss Cass	29,528	49.5	−7.2
Liberal	John Gray	25,090	42.0	+9.2
Democratic Labor	Lucia Hayward	3,363	5.6	−3.1
Australia	Thomas Archay	1,700	2.8	+0.9
Total formal votes		59,681	97.4	
Informal votes		1,604	2.6	
Turnout		61,285	97.1	
Two-party-preferred result
Labor	Moss Cass		52.1	−6.6
Liberal	John Gray		47.9	+6.6
Labor hold		Swing	−6.6	

=== McMillan ===
This section is an excerpt from Electoral results for the Division of McMillan § 1975

1975 Australian federal election: McMillan
Party	Candidate	Votes	%	±%
Labor	William Rutherford	22,402	39.6	−4.3
Liberal	Barry Simon	18,415	32.6	+8.4
National Country	Arthur Hewson	12,971	22.9	−1.9
Democratic Labor	Les Hilton	2,227	3.9	−0.2
Independent	David Little	525	0.9	+0.9
Total formal votes		56,540	98.0	
Informal votes		1,182	2.0	
Turnout		57,722	95.4	
Two-party-preferred result
Liberal	Barry Simon	32,070	56.7	+56.7
Labor	William Rutherford	24,470	43.3	−2.1
Liberal gain from National Country		Swing	+2.1	

=== Melbourne ===
This section is an excerpt from Electoral results for the Division of Melbourne § 1975

1975 Australian federal election: Melbourne
Party	Candidate	Votes	%	±%
Labor	Ted Innes	30,525	59.2	−9.7
Liberal	Robert Fallshaw	14,431	28.0	+6.8
Democratic Labor	Desmond Burke	4,690	9.1	+3.8
Australia	Veronica Schwarz	1,192	2.3	−1.2
Communist	Ian Fehring	710	1.4	+1.4
Total formal votes		51,548	96.9	
Informal votes		1,659	3.1	
Turnout		53,207	91.5	
Two-party-preferred result
Labor	Ted Innes		62.7	−9.4
Liberal	Robert Fallshaw		37.3	+9.4
Labor hold		Swing	−9.4	

=== Melbourne Ports ===
This section is an excerpt from Electoral results for the Division of Melbourne Ports § 1975

1975 Australian federal election: Melbourne Ports
Party	Candidate	Votes	%	±%
Labor	Frank Crean	28,460	55.5	−4.9
Liberal	Roger Johnston	19,485	38.0	+7.4
Australia	Beverley Broadbent	1,641	3.2	−1.5
Democratic Labor	Gordon Haberman	1,369	2.7	−1.6
National Country	Frederick Gray	168	0.3	+0.3
Independent	Henry Sanders	154	0.3	+0.3
Total formal votes		51,277	97.1	
Informal votes		1,553	2.9	
Turnout		52,830	91.1	
Two-party-preferred result
Labor	Frank Crean		58.3	−5.8
Liberal	Roger Johnston		41.7	+5.8
Labor hold		Swing	−5.8	

=== Murray ===
This section is an excerpt from Electoral results for the Division of Murray § 1975

1975 Australian federal election: Murray
Party	Candidate	Votes	%	±%
National Country	Bruce Lloyd	39,050	69.9	+16.9
Labor	Marjorie Gillies	13,547	24.3	−2.7
Democratic Labor	Patrick Payne	3,239	5.8	+1.2
Total formal votes		55,836	98.1	
Informal votes		1,084	1.9	
Turnout		56,920	97.0	
Two-party-preferred result
National Country	Bruce Lloyd		75.1	+4.9
Labor	Marjorie Gillies		24.9	−4.9
National Country hold		Swing	+4.9	

=== Scullin ===
This section is an excerpt from Electoral results for the Division of Scullin § 1975

1975 Australian federal election: Scullin
Party	Candidate	Votes	%	±%
Labor	Harry Jenkins	31,307	56.3	−10.2
Liberal	Gerard Clarke	19,847	35.8	+9.9
Democratic Labor	Bernard McGrath	2,829	5.1	−0.9
Independent	Bernard Irving	1,622	2.9	+2.9
Total formal votes		55,605	97.2	
Informal votes		1,604	2.8	
Turnout		57,209	95.5	
Two-party-preferred result
Labor	Harry Jenkins		58.3	−9.8
Liberal	Gerard Clarke		41.7	+9.8
Labor hold		Swing	−9.8	

=== Wannon ===
This section is an excerpt from Electoral results for the Division of Wannon § 1975

1975 Australian federal election: Wannon
Party	Candidate	Votes	%	±%
Liberal	Malcolm Fraser	33,290	63.3	+8.5
Labor	Keith Wilson	16,521	31.4	−5.9
Democratic Labor	John Casanova	2,804	5.3	−1.4
Total formal votes		52,615	99.0	
Informal votes		539	1.0	
Turnout		53,154	97.4	
Two-party-preferred result
Liberal	Malcolm Fraser		68.2	+6.8
Labor	Keith Wilson		31.8	−6.8
Liberal hold		Swing	+6.8	

=== Wills ===
This section is an excerpt from Electoral results for the Division of Wills § 1975

1975 Australian federal election: Wills
Party	Candidate	Votes	%	±%
Labor	Gordon Bryant	32,382	60.2	−1.1
Liberal	Howard Kiel	17,562	32.7	+2.9
Democratic Labor	John Flint	3,819	7.1	+0.7
Total formal votes		53,763	97.6	
Informal votes		1,336	2.4	
Turnout		55,099	95.9	
Two-party-preferred result
Labor	Gordon Bryant		60.9	−2.5
Liberal	Howard Kiel		39.1	+2.5
Labor hold		Swing	−2.5	

=== Wimmera ===
This section is an excerpt from Electoral results for the Division of Wimmera § 1975

1975 Australian federal election: Wimmera
Party	Candidate	Votes	%	±%
National Country	Robert King	28,275	58.8	+19.8
Labor	Brian Brooke	16,030	33.4	−3.5
Independent	Francis Petering	1,986	4.1	+4.1
Democratic Labor	Marjorie McOwan	1,762	3.7	−0.1
Total formal votes		48,053	98.7	
Informal votes		649	1.3	
Turnout		48,702	97.0	
Two-party-preferred result
National Country	Robert King		64.2	+2.6
Labor	Brian Brooke		35.8	−2.6
National Country hold		Swing	+2.6	

== Queensland ==
1975 Australian federal election (Queensland)
← 1974	13 December 1975	1977 →

All 18 Queensland seats in the House of Representatives 9 seats needed for a majority
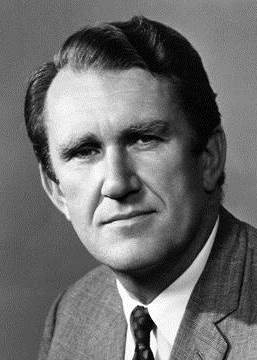

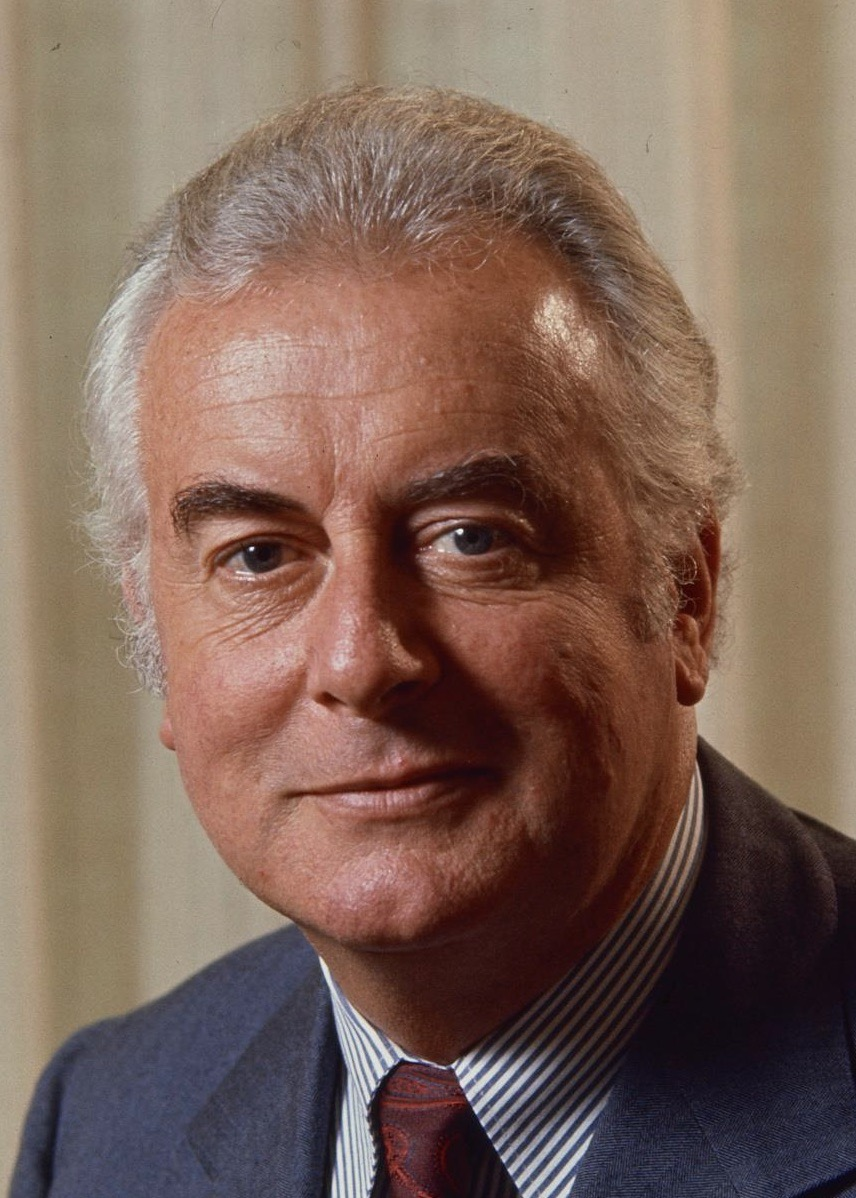
	First party	Second party
Leader	Malcolm Fraser	Gough Whitlam
Party	Coalition	Labor
Seats before	12	6
Seats won	17	1
Seat change	▲5	▼5
Popular vote	673,148	439,405
Percentage	59.3%	38.8%
Swing	▲5.2pp	▼5.2pp
TPP	60.2%	39.8%
TPP swing	▲5.6pp	▼5.6pp

=== Bowman ===
This section is an excerpt from Electoral results for the Division of Bowman § 1975

1975 Australian federal election: Bowman
Party	Candidate	Votes	%	±%
Liberal	David Jull	36,458	46.8	+5.8
Labor	Len Keogh	32,825	42.2	−7.6
National Country	James Dean	7,535	9.7	+1.6
Workers	Donald Wright	1,046	1.3	+1.3
Total formal votes		77,864	98.7	
Informal votes		1,009	1.3	
Turnout		78,873	95.9	
Two-party-preferred result
Liberal	David Jull	44,438	57.1	+8.4
Labor	Len Keogh	33,426	42.9	−8.4
Liberal gain from Labor		Swing	+8.4	

=== Brisbane ===
This section is an excerpt from Electoral results for the Division of Brisbane § 1975

1975 Australian federal election: Brisbane
Party	Candidate	Votes	%	±%
Labor	Manfred Cross	24,802	45.3	−3.9
Liberal	Peter Johnson	24,130	44.1	+3.3
National Country	Harold Porter	4,813	8.8	+0.4
Workers	Rodney Jeanneret	1,000	1.8	+1.8
Independent	William Kenney	792	1.3	+1.3
Total formal votes		54,745	98.4	
Informal votes		889	1.6	
Turnout		55,634	93.0	
Two-party-preferred result
Liberal	Peter Johnson	29,495	53.9	+5.0
Labor	Manfred Cross	25,250	46.1	−5.0
Liberal gain from Labor		Swing	+5.0	

=== Capricornia ===
This section is an excerpt from Electoral results for the Division of Capricornia § 1975

1975 Australian federal election: Capricornia
Party	Candidate	Votes	%	±%
Labor	Doug Everingham	26,874	48.3	−4.0
National Country	Colin Carige	15,035	27.0	+1.4
Liberal	Alfred Millroy	13,735	24.7	+3.7
Total formal votes		55,644	99.1	
Informal votes		513	0.9	
Turnout		56,157	96.1	
Two-party-preferred result
National Country	Colin Carige	27,890	50.1	+5.0
Labor	Doug Everingham	27,754	49.9	−5.0
National Country gain from Labor		Swing	+5.0	

=== Darling Downs ===
This section is an excerpt from Electoral results for the Division of Darling Downs § 1975

1975 Australian federal election: Darling Downs
Party	Candidate	Votes	%	±%
National Country	Tom McVeigh	42,133	69.4	+4.5
Labor	Peter Wood	18,590	30.6	−3.2
Total formal votes		60,723	99.0	
Informal votes		607	1.0	
Turnout		61,330	95.8	
National Country hold		Swing	+4.0	

=== Dawson ===
This section is an excerpt from Electoral results for the Division of Dawson § 1975

1975 Australian federal election: Dawson
Party	Candidate	Votes	%	±%
Labor	Rex Patterson	26,810	45.8	−4.8
National Country	Ray Braithwaite	24,022	41.0	+3.4
National Country	Noel McFarlane	6,936	11.8	+11.8
Independent	Colin Bailey	821	1.4	+1.4
Total formal votes		58,589	98.8	
Informal votes		718	1.2	
Turnout		59,307	95.4	
Two-party-preferred result
National Country	Ray Braithwaite	31,401	53.6	+4.2
Labor	Rex Patterson	27,188	46.4	−4.2
National Country gain from Labor		Swing	+4.2	

=== Fisher ===
This section is an excerpt from Electoral results for the Division of Fisher § 1975

1975 Australian federal election: Fisher
Party	Candidate	Votes	%	±%
National Country	Evan Adermann	49,850	70.6	+1.8
Labor	Ivan Guy	18,757	26.5	−4.8
Workers	Dennis Marshall	2,110	3.0	−1.7
Total formal votes		70,717	98.8	
Informal votes		854	1.2	
Turnout		71,571	96.1	
Two-party-preferred result
National Country	Evan Adermann		72.9	+4.2
Labor	Ivan Guy		27.1	−4.2
National Country hold		Swing	+4.2	

=== Griffith ===
This section is an excerpt from Electoral results for the Division of Griffith § 1975

1975 Australian federal election: Griffith
Party	Candidate	Votes	%	±%
Liberal	Don Cameron	31,483	56.6	+7.6
Labor	Ben Humphreys	23,133	41.6	−6.1
Workers	Wallace Younger	975	1.8	+1.8
Total formal votes		55,591	98.6	
Informal votes		772	1.4	
Turnout		56,363	94.9	
Two-party-preferred result
Liberal	Don Cameron		58.0	+6.6
Labor	Ben Humphreys		42.0	−6.6
Liberal hold		Swing	+6.6	

=== Herbert ===
This section is an excerpt from Electoral results for the Division of Herbert § 1975

1975 Australian federal election: Herbert
Party	Candidate	Votes	%	±%
Liberal	Robert Bonnett	34,620	58.0	+4.9
Labor	John Rockett	25,096	42.0	−2.2
Total formal votes		59,716	98.4	
Informal votes		945	1.6	
Turnout		60,661	94.8	
Liberal hold		Swing	+3.8	

=== Kennedy ===
This section is an excerpt from Electoral results for the Division of Kennedy § 1975

1975 Australian federal election: Kennedy
Party	Candidate	Votes	%	±%
National Country	Bob Katter, Sr.	29,704	62.5	−0.1
Labor	Robert Gleeson	16,981	35.7	−1.7
Workers	Charles Rendall	837	1.8	+1.8
Total formal votes		47,522	98.7	
Informal votes		622	1.3	
Turnout		48,144	93.6	
Two-party-preferred result
National Country	Bob Katter, Sr.		63.9	+1.3
Labor	Robert Gleeson		36.1	−1.3
National Country hold		Swing	+1.3	

=== Leichhardt ===
This section is an excerpt from Electoral results for the Division of Leichhardt § 1975

1975 Australian federal election: Leichhardt
Party	Candidate	Votes	%	±%
Labor	Bill Wood	25,920	46.5	−3.1
National Country	David Thomson	21,318	38.2	−6.3
Liberal	Laurence Hoins	6,918	12.4	+12.4
Independent	Clarence Grogan	982	1.8	+1.8
Democratic Labor	Bernard Marsh	645	1.2	+1.2
Total formal votes		55,783	98.0	
Informal votes		1,134	2.0	
Turnout		56,917	92.4	
Two-party-preferred result
National Country	David Thomson	29,204	52.4	+5.7
Labor	Bill Wood	26,579	47.6	−5.7
National Country gain from Labor		Swing	+5.7	

=== Lilley ===
This section is an excerpt from Electoral results for the Division of Lilley § 1975

1975 Australian federal election: Lilley
Party	Candidate	Votes	%	±%
Liberal	Kevin Cairns	31,018	51.4	+6.5
Labor	Frank Doyle	25,142	41.7	−5.8
National Country	Peter Addison	4,194	6.9	+0.5
Total formal votes		60,354	98.8	
Informal votes		751	1.2	
Turnout		61,105	95.0	
Two-party-preferred result
Liberal	Kevin Cairns		57.7	+6.7
Labor	Frank Doyle		42.3	−6.7
Liberal hold		Swing	+6.7	

=== Maranoa ===
This section is an excerpt from Electoral results for the Division of Maranoa § 1975

1975 Australian federal election: Maranoa
Party	Candidate	Votes	%	±%
National Country	James Corbett	30,158	68.8	+0.1
Labor	Reuben Coupe	11,962	27.3	−4.0
Workers	Lindsay Sturgess	1,688	3.9	+3.9
Total formal votes		43,808	98.8	
Informal votes		515	1.2	
Turnout		44,323	95.5	
Two-party-preferred result
National Country	James Corbett		71.9	+3.2
Labor	Reuben Coupe		28.1	−3.2
National Country hold		Swing	+3.2	

=== McPherson ===
This section is an excerpt from Electoral results for the Division of McPherson § 1975

1975 Australian federal election: McPherson
Party	Candidate	Votes	%	±%
Liberal	Eric Robinson	61,455	64.4	+7.8
Labor	Brian Paterson	30,644	32.1	−7.2
Workers	Coral Finlay	3,378	3.5	+3.5
Total formal votes		95,477	98.8	
Informal votes		1,152	1.2	
Turnout		96,629	94.6	
Two-party-preferred result
Liberal	Eric Robinson		66.4	+7.6
Labor	Brian Paterson		33.6	−7.6
Liberal hold		Swing	+7.6	

=== Moreton ===
This section is an excerpt from Electoral results for the Division of Moreton § 1975

1975 Australian federal election: Moreton
Party	Candidate	Votes	%	±%
Liberal	James Killen	35,003	61.9	+6.4
Labor	Lewin Blazevich	20,338	35.9	−6.5
Independent	William Appleton	929	1.6	+1.6
Independent	John Fitzgerald	323	0.6	+0.6
Total formal votes		56,593	98.8	
Informal votes		686	1.2	
Turnout		57,279	95.8	
Two-party-preferred result
Liberal	James Killen		62.5	+6.2
Labor	Lewin Blazevich		37.5	−6.2
Liberal hold		Swing	+6.2	

=== Oxley ===
This section is an excerpt from Electoral results for the Division of Oxley § 1975

1975 Australian federal election: Oxley
Party	Candidate	Votes	%	±%
Labor	Bill Hayden	36,879	50.2	−6.8
National Country	James Shapcott	18,286	24.9	+24.9
Liberal	Cornelis Frederiks	16,711	22.7	−18.1
Workers	Neil Russell	1,631	2.2	+2.2
Total formal votes		73,507	98.6	
Informal votes		1,036	1.4	
Turnout		74,543	95.8	
Two-party-preferred result
Labor	Bill Hayden		53.8	−4.5
National Country	James Shapcott		46.2	+46.2
Labor hold		Swing	−4.5	

=== Petrie ===
This section is an excerpt from Electoral results for the Division of Petrie § 1975

1975 Australian federal election: Petrie
Party	Candidate	Votes	%	±%
Liberal	John Hodges	47,414	62.5	+21.2
Labor	John Hungerford	28,452	37.5	−5.5
Total formal votes		75,866	98.6	
Informal votes		1,049	1.4	
Turnout		76,915	95.6	
Liberal hold		Swing	+7.5	

=== Ryan ===
This section is an excerpt from Electoral results for the Division of Ryan § 1975

1975 Australian federal election: Ryan
Party	Candidate	Votes	%	±%
Liberal	John Moore	31,096	43.2	−14.0
Labor	Colin Taylor	22,914	31.9	−6.4
National Country	Douglas MacTaggart	14,980	20.8	+20.8
Workers	David Boughen	2,917	4.1	+4.1
Total formal votes		71,907	99.0	
Informal votes		754	1.0	
Turnout		72,661	95.6	
Two-party-preferred result
Liberal	John Moore	47,835	66.5	+6.9
Labor	Colin Taylor	24,072	33.5	−6.9
Liberal hold		Swing	+6.9	

=== Wide Bay ===
This section is an excerpt from Electoral results for the Division of Wide Bay § 1975

1975 Australian federal election: Wide Bay
Party	Candidate	Votes	%	±%
National Country	Clarrie Millar	34,143	57.7	+14.0
Labor	Brendan Hansen	23,286	39.3	−6.6
Workers	Gerrit Alberts	1,759	3.0	+3.0
Total formal votes		59,188	99.0	
Informal votes		598	1.0	
Turnout		59,786	96.6	
Two-party-preferred result
National Country	Clarrie Millar		59.3	+5.8
Labor	Brendan Hansen		40.7	−5.8
National Country hold		Swing	+5.8	

== South Australia ==
1975 Australian federal election (South Australia)
← 1974	13 December 1975	1977 →

All 12 SA seats in the House of Representatives 6 seats needed for a majority
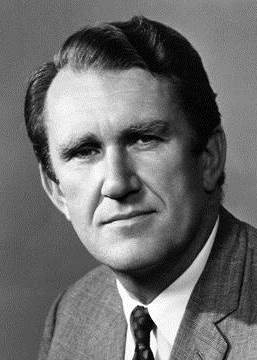

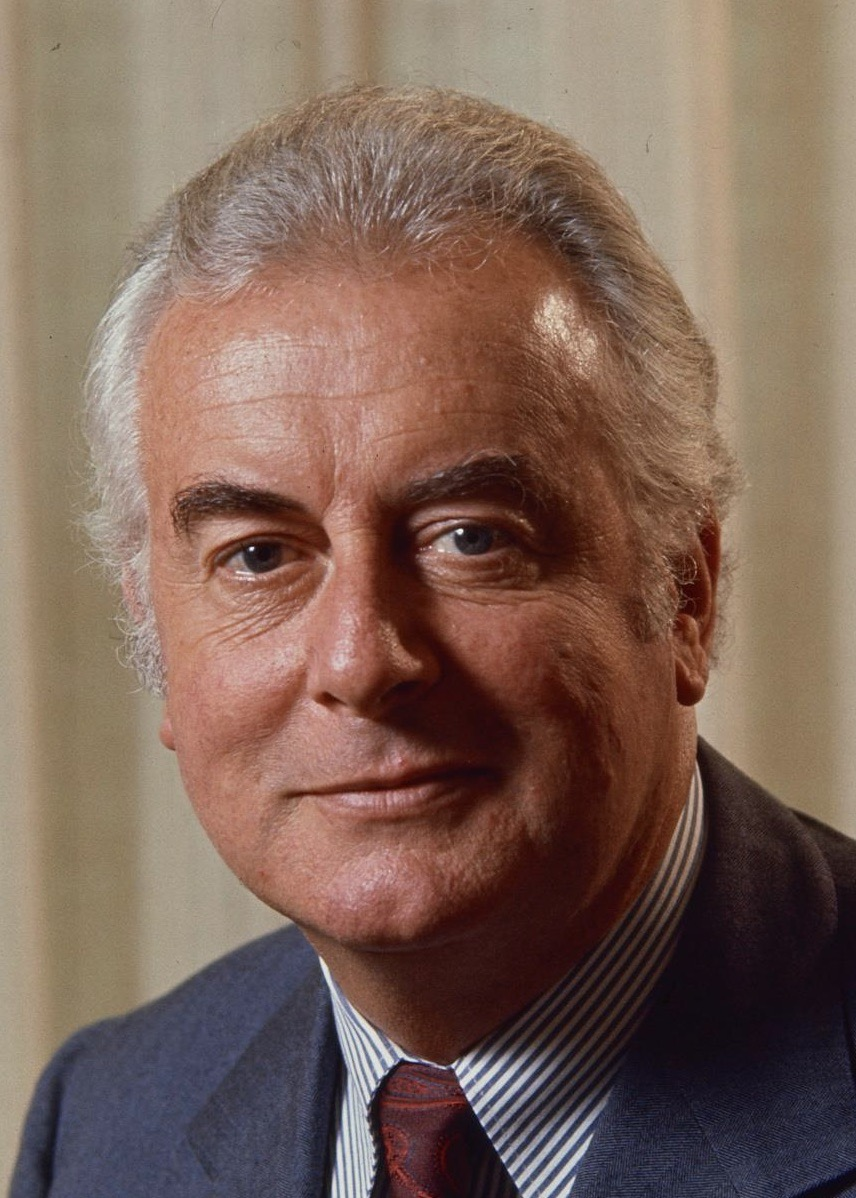
	First party	Second party
Leader	Malcolm Fraser	Gough Whitlam
Party	Coalition	Labor
Seats before	5	7
Seats won	6	6
Seat change	▲1	▼1
Popular vote	369,423	316,006
Percentage	49.9%	42.6%
Swing	▲9.2pp	▼6.1pp
TPP	55.1%	44.9%
TPP swing	▲7.6pp	▼7.6pp

=== Adelaide ===
This section is an excerpt from Electoral results for the Division of Adelaide § 1975

1975 Australian federal election: Adelaide
Party	Candidate	Votes	%	±%
Labor	Chris Hurford	28,621	49.5	−6.3
Liberal	Harold Steele	24,825	43.0	+9.6
Liberal Movement	Robert Hercus	3,817	6.6	−2.3
Australia	David Middleton	525	0.9	−1.0
Total formal votes		57,788	93.3	
Informal votes		1,633	2.7	
Turnout		59,421	95.2	
Two-party-preferred result
Labor	Chris Hurford	30,487	52.8	−6.3
Liberal	Harold Steele	27,301	47.2	+6.3
Labor hold		Swing	−6.3	

=== Angas ===
This section is an excerpt from Electoral results for the Division of Angas (1949–1977) § 1949

1975 Australian federal election: Angas
Party	Candidate	Votes	%	±%
Liberal	Geoffrey Giles	37,281	68.1	+15.0
Labor	Adolf Thiel	14,977	26.9	−3.0
Liberal Movement	Giordano Graziani	2,255	4.0	+0.3
Workers	Richard Philippe	561	1.0	+1.0
Total formal votes		55,744	98.1	
Informal votes		1,109	1.9	
Turnout		56,883	96.3	
Two-party-preferred result
Liberal	Geoffrey Giles		71.5	+4.0
Labor	Adolf Thiel		28.5	−4.0
Liberal hold		Swing	+4.0	

=== Barker ===
This section is an excerpt from Electoral results for the Division of Barker § 1975

1975 Australian federal election: Barker
Party	Candidate	Votes	%	±%
Liberal	James Porter	36,894	58.5	+10.0
Labor	Graham Bath	19,334	30.6	−1.6
National Country	Kenneth Williams	4,070	6.4	−5.0
Liberal Movement	Rodney Roberts	2,176	3.4	−3.1
Independent	Lily Bayly	630	1.0	+1.0
Total formal votes		63,104	98.0	
Informal votes		1,305	2.0	
Turnout		64,409	97.0	
Two-party-preferred result
Liberal	James Porter		67.3	+2.1
Labor	Graham Bath		32.7	−2.1
Liberal hold		Swing	+2.1	

=== Bonython ===
This section is an excerpt from Electoral results for the Division of Bonython § 1975

1975 Australian federal election: Bonython
Party	Candidate	Votes	%	±%
Labor	Martin Nicholls	41,363	50.7	−9.7
Liberal	Alan Irving	30,568	37.4	+16.7
Liberal Movement	John Longhurst	5,605	6.9	−1.4
Communist	Robert Durbridge	4,099	5.0	+5.0
Total formal votes		81,635	96.8	
Informal votes		2,727	3.2	
Turnout		84,362	96.1	
Two-party-preferred result
Labor	Martin Nicholls		56.0	−9.6
Liberal	Alan Irving		44.0	+9.6
Labor hold		Swing	−9.6	

=== Boothby ===
This section is an excerpt from Electoral results for the Division of Boothby § 1975

1975 Australian federal election: Boothby
Party	Candidate	Votes	%	±%
Liberal	John McLeay	34,664	58.1	+13.0
Labor	Mark Pickhaver	18,376	30.8	−3.6
Liberal Movement	Peter Berman	6,172	10.4	−7.6
Independent	Alexander Hunter	408	0.7	+0.7
Total formal votes		59,620	98.2	
Informal votes		1,081	1.8	
Turnout		60,701	96.0	
Two-party-preferred result
Liberal	John McLeay		66.5	+5.4
Labor	Mark Pickhaver		33.5	−5.4
Liberal hold		Swing	+5.4	

=== Grey ===
This section is an excerpt from Electoral results for the Division of Grey § 1975

1975 Australian federal election: Grey
Party	Candidate	Votes	%	±%
Labor	Laurie Wallis	28,182	49.4	−3.3
Liberal	Dennis Burman	26,438	46.4	+14.2
Liberal Movement	Arnold Eckersley	2,371	4.2	+2.6
Total formal votes		56,991	97.9	
Informal votes		1,220	2.1	
Turnout		58,211	95.3	
Two-party-preferred result
Labor	Laurie Wallis	28,777	50.5	−5.0
Liberal	Dennis Burman	28,214	49.5	+5.0
Labor hold		Swing	−5.0	

=== Hawker ===
This section is an excerpt from Electoral results for the Division of Hawker § 1975

1975 Australian federal election: Hawker
Party	Candidate	Votes	%	±%
Labor	Ralph Jacobi	29,036	49.4	−6.2
Liberal	Craig Speil	25,842	44.0	+12.9
Liberal Movement	Stewart Leggett	3,890	6.6	−5.2
Total formal votes		58,768	97.9	
Informal votes		1,291	2.1	
Turnout		60,059	96.5	
Two-party-preferred result
Labor	Ralph Jacobi	29,974	51.0	−9.2
Liberal	Craig Speil	28,794	49.0	+9.2
Labor hold		Swing	−9.2	

=== Hindmarsh ===
This section is an excerpt from Electoral results for the Division of Hindmarsh § 1975

1975 Australian federal election: Hindmarsh
Party	Candidate	Votes	%	±%
Labor	Clyde Cameron	32,978	54.4	−8.5
Liberal	Valentine Dignum	23,806	39.3	+11.7
Liberal Movement	Ian McGowan	2,982	4.9	−2.7
Independent	Ross Stanford	809	1.3	+1.3
Total formal votes		60,575	97.0	
Informal votes		1,857	3.0	
Turnout		62,432	96.0	
Two-party-preferred result
Labor	Clyde Cameron		56.3	−9.6
Liberal	Valentine Dignum		43.7	+9.6
Labor hold		Swing	−9.6	

=== Kingston ===
This section is an excerpt from Electoral results for the Division of Kingston § 1975

1975 Australian federal election: Kingston
Party	Candidate	Votes	%	±%
Liberal	Grant Chapman	34,893	48.3	+12.5
Labor	Richard Gun	30,296	41.9	−11.0
Liberal Movement	Rodney Adam	6,412	8.9	−1.2
Workers	Verna Oakley	696	1.0	+1.0
Total formal votes		72,297	98.0	
Informal votes		1,469	2.0	
Turnout		73,766	96.7	
Two-party-preferred result
Liberal	Grant Chapman	40,932	56.6	+12.7
Labor	Richard Gun	31,365	43.4	−12.7
Liberal gain from Labor		Swing	+12.7	

=== Port Adelaide ===
This section is an excerpt from Electoral results for the Division of Port Adelaide § 1975

1975 Australian federal election: Port Adelaide
Party	Candidate	Votes	%	±%
Labor	Mick Young	34,701	60.1	−5.2
Liberal	Terence Hanson	20,285	35.1	+11.1
Liberal Movement	Jean Lawrie	2,734	4.7	−1.9
Total formal votes		57,720	96.5	
Informal votes		2,092	3.5	
Turnout		59,812	96.5	
Two-party-preferred result
Labor	Mick Young		61.3	−9.6
Liberal	Terence Hanson		38.7	+9.6
Labor hold		Swing	−9.6	

=== Sturt ===
This section is an excerpt from Electoral results for the Division of Sturt § 1975

1975 Australian federal election: Sturt
Party	Candidate	Votes	%	±%
Liberal	Ian Wilson	37,087	54.2	+8.8
Labor	Graham Maguire	25,510	37.3	−6.9
Liberal Movement	Barry Lake	3,835	5.6	−1.6
Workers	William Forster	2,043	3.0	+3.0
Total formal votes		68,475	97.9	
Informal votes		1,500	2.1	
Turnout		69,975	97.0	
Two-party-preferred result
Liberal	Ian Wilson		60.3	+8.3
Labor	Graham Maguire		39.7	−8.3
Liberal hold		Swing	+8.3	

=== Wakefield ===
This section is an excerpt from Electoral results for the Division of Wakefield § 1975

1975 Australian federal election: Wakefield
Party	Candidate	Votes	%	±%
Liberal	Bert Kelly	32,070	66.2	+16.8
Labor	Irene Krastev	12,632	26.1	−2.8
Liberal Movement	John Lienert	3,719	7.7	+0.5
Total formal votes		48,421	98.1	
Informal votes		917	1.9	
Turnout		49,338	96.2	
Two-party-preferred result
Liberal	Bert Kelly		72.0	+4.5
Labor	Irene Krastev		38.0	−4.5
Liberal hold		Swing	+4.5	

== Western Australia ==
1975 Australian federal election (Western Australia)
← 1974	13 December 1975	1977 →

All 10 WA seats in the House of Representatives 5 seats needed for a majority
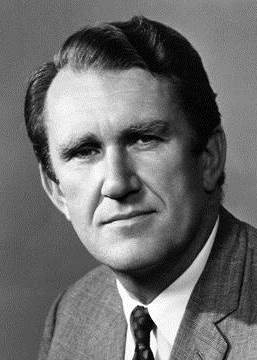

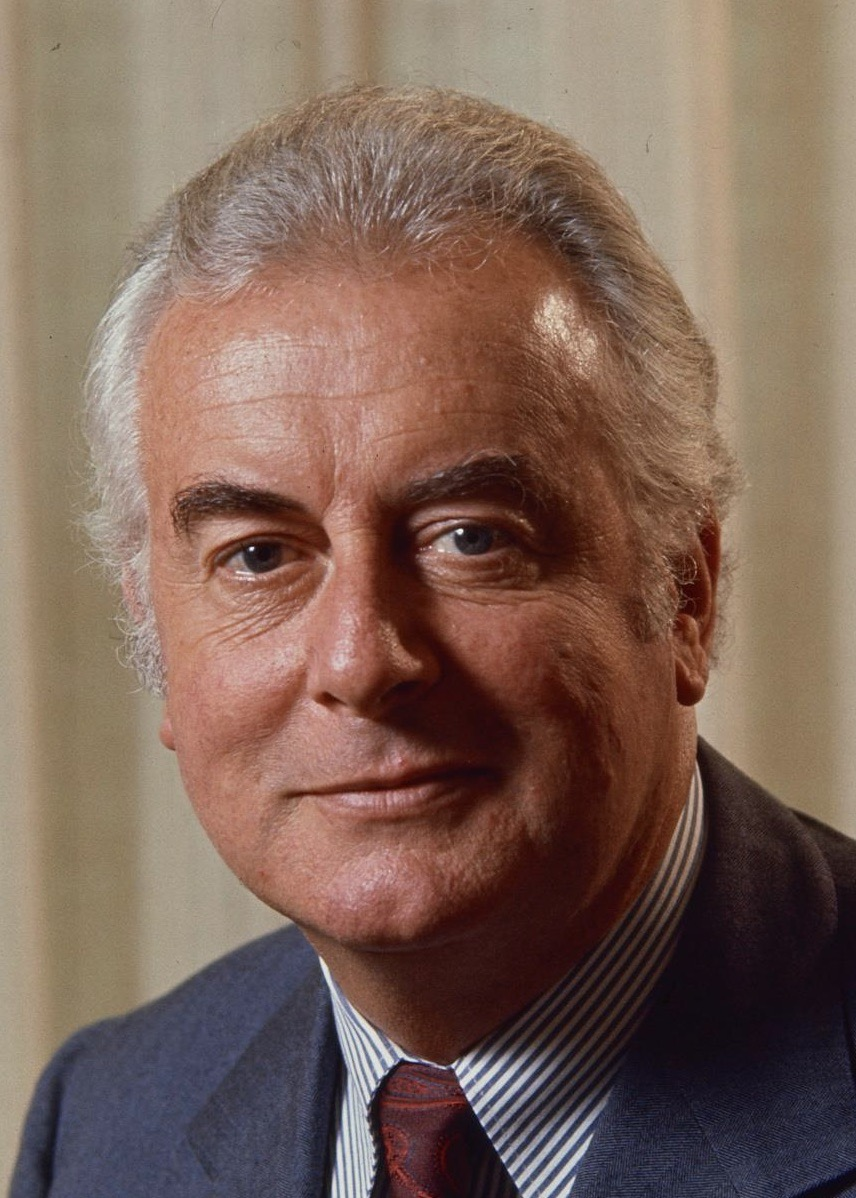
	First party	Second party
Leader	Malcolm Fraser	Gough Whitlam
Party	Coalition	Labor
Seats before	5	5
Seats won	9	1
Seat change	▲4	▼4
Popular vote	357,406	244,404
Percentage	58.6%	40.1%
Swing	▲6.5pp	▼6.5pp
TPP	58.8%	41.2%
TPP swing	▲7.3pp	▼7.3pp

=== Canning ===
This section is an excerpt from Electoral results for the Division of Canning § 1975

1975 Australian federal election: Canning
Party	Candidate	Votes	%	±%
Liberal	Mel Bungey	28,002	46.9	+11.2
Labor	Marilyn Anthony	17,916	30.0	−0.6
National Country	John Hallett	13,748	23.0	−8.7
Total formal votes		59,666	97.9	
Informal votes		1,288	2.1	
Turnout		60,954	95.8	
Two-party-preferred result
Liberal	Mel Bungey	40,721	68.2	+3.9
Labor	Marilyn Anthony	18,945	31.8	+31.8
Liberal hold		Swing	+3.9	

=== Curtin ===
This section is an excerpt from Electoral results for the Division of Curtin § 1975

1975 Australian federal election: Curtin
Party	Candidate	Votes	%	±%
Liberal	Victor Garland	41,901	66.3	+12.4
Labor	John Crouch	21,253	33.7	−5.2
Total formal votes		63,154	97.9	
Informal votes		1,371	2.1	
Turnout		64,525	94.7	
Liberal hold		Swing	+7.0	

=== Forrest ===
This section is an excerpt from Electoral results for the Division of Forrest § 1975

1975 Australian federal election: Forrest
Party	Candidate	Votes	%	±%
Liberal	Peter Drummond	30,158	54.7	+8.0
Labor	Geoffrey Davy	19,075	34.6	−2.6
National Country	Noel Klopper	5,134	9.3	−5.7
Independent	Noel Duggan	484	0.9	+0.9
Independent	Duncan Hordacre	290	0.5	+0.5
Total formal votes		55,141	97.8	
Informal votes		1,217	2.2	
Turnout		56,358	96.7	
Two-party-preferred result
Liberal	Peter Drummond		63.8	+2.4
Labor	Geoffrey Davy		36.2	−2.4
Liberal hold		Swing	+2.4	

=== Fremantle ===
This section is an excerpt from Electoral results for the Division of Fremantle § 1975

1975 Australian federal election: Fremantle
Party	Candidate	Votes	%	±%
Labor	Kim Beazley Sr.	32,570	51.6	−7.8
Liberal	Leon Lapinski	30,509	48.4	+12.5
Total formal votes		63,079	97.6	
Informal votes		1,568	2.4	
Turnout		64,647	95.5	
Labor hold		Swing	−9.0	

=== Kalgoorlie ===
This section is an excerpt from Electoral results for the Division of Kalgoorlie § 1975

1975 Australian federal election: Kalgoorlie
Party	Candidate	Votes	%	±%
Liberal	Mick Cotter	25,994	51.7	+9.8
Labor	Fred Collard	22,734	45.2	−5.1
Workers	Graham Mills	1,538	3.1	+3.1
Total formal votes		50,266	97.9	
Informal votes		1,055	2.1	
Turnout		51,321	89.8	
Two-party-preferred result
Liberal	Mick Cotter		54.2	+6.3
Labor	Fred Collard		45.8	−6.3
Liberal gain from Labor		Swing	+6.3	

=== Moore ===
This section is an excerpt from Electoral results for the Division of Moore § 1975

1975 Australian federal election: Moore
Party	Candidate	Votes	%	±%
Liberal	John Hyde	38,845	56.0	+20.5
Labor	Allen Blanchard	21,230	30.6	−6.5
National Country	Graham Anderson	9,312	13.4	−12.7
Total formal votes		69,387	97.8	
Informal votes		1,583	2.2	
Turnout		70,970	95.3	
Two-party-preferred result
Liberal	John Hyde		67.2	+6.7
Labor	Allen Blanchard		32.8	−6.7
Liberal hold		Swing	+6.7	

=== Perth ===
This section is an excerpt from Electoral results for the Division of Perth § 1975

1975 Australian federal election: Perth
Party	Candidate	Votes	%	±%
Liberal	Ross McLean	31,658	50.7	+13.0
Labor	Joe Berinson	29,902	47.9	−8.6
Communist	Vic Slater	890	1.4	+0.5
Total formal votes		62,450	97.1	
Informal votes		1,845	2.9	
Turnout		64,295	94.3	
Two-party-preferred result
Liberal	Ross McLean		50.8	+9.0
Labor	Joe Berinson		49.2	−9.0
Liberal gain from Labor		Swing	+9.0	

=== Stirling ===
This section is an excerpt from Electoral results for the Division of Stirling § 1975

1975 Australian federal election: Stirling
Party	Candidate	Votes	%	±%
Liberal	Ian Viner	34,021	57.9	+11.6
Labor	Graham Reece	23,073	39.3	−8.3
Workers	Brian Butterworth	1,643	2.8	+2.8
Total formal votes		58,737	98.1	
Informal votes		1,151	1.9	
Turnout		59,888	95.3	
Two-party-preferred result
Liberal	Ian Viner		59.3	+9.3
Labor	Graham Reece		40.7	−9.3
Liberal hold		Swing	+9.3	

=== Swan ===
This section is an excerpt from Electoral results for the Division of Swan § 1975

1975 Australian federal election: Swan
Party	Candidate	Votes	%	±%
Liberal	John Martyr	30,914	48.8	+9.9
Labor	Adrian Bennett	29,954	47.2	−6.1
National Country	Peter Masson	2,533	4.0	−2.6
Total formal votes		63,401	97.3	
Informal votes		1,748	2.7	
Turnout		65,149	94.3	
Two-party-preferred result
Liberal	John Martyr	33,029	52.1	+7.7
Labor	Adrian Bennett	30,372	47.9	−7.7
Liberal gain from Labor		Swing	+7.7	

=== Tangney ===
This section is an excerpt from Electoral results for the Division of Tangney § 1975

1975 Australian federal election: Tangney
Party	Candidate	Votes	%	±%
Liberal	Peter Richardson	34,677	54.4	+12.8
Labor	John Dawkins	26,697	41.9	−8.7
Workers	Warwick Agnew	2,395	3.8	+3.8
Total formal votes		63,769	97.7	
Informal votes		1,508	2.3	
Turnout		65,277	94.8	
Two-party-preferred result
Liberal	Peter Richardson		56.6	+9.7
Labor	John Dawkins		43.4	−9.7
Liberal gain from Labor		Swing	+9.7	

== Tasmania ==
1975 Australian federal election (Tasmania)
← 1974	13 December 1975	1977 →

All 5 Tasmanian seats in the House of Representatives 3 seats needed for a majority
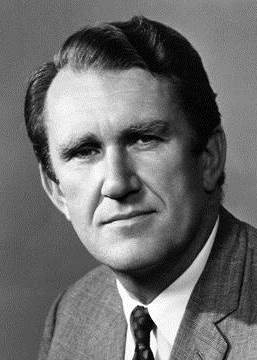

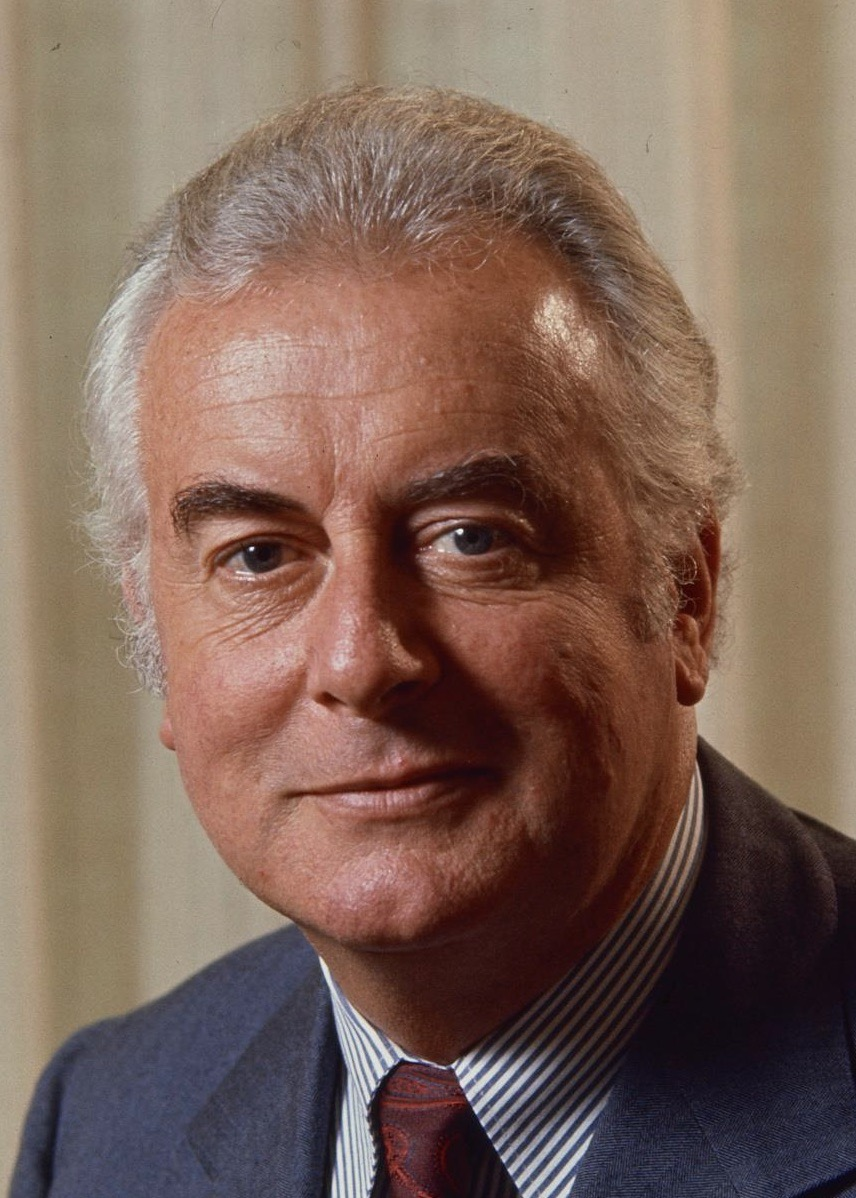
	First party	Second party
Leader	Malcolm Fraser	Gough Whitlam
Party	Coalition	Labor
Seats before	0	5
Seats won	5	0
Seat change	▲5	▼5
Popular vote	134,250	105,324
Percentage	55.4%	43.5%
Swing	▲11.0pp	▼11.6pp
TPP	55.9%	44.1%
TPP swing	▲11.3pp	▼11.3pp

=== Bass ===
This section is an excerpt from Electoral results for the Division of Bass § 1975

1975 Australian federal election: Bass
Party	Candidate	Votes	%	±%
Liberal	Kevin Newman	28,382	63.1	+17.1
Labor	Michael McLaughlin	15,574	34.6	−19.4
Workers	Kevin Chaffey	1,001	2.2	+2.2
Total formal votes		44,957	98.1	
Informal votes		878	1.9	
Turnout		45,835	96.7	
Two-party-preferred result
Liberal	Kevin Newman		64.1	+18.1
Labor	Michael McLaughlin		35.9	−18.1
Liberal hold		Swing	+18.1	

=== Braddon ===
This section is an excerpt from Electoral results for the Division of Braddon § 1975

1975 Australian federal election: Braddon
Party	Candidate	Votes	%	±%
Liberal	Ray Groom	27,131	52.9	+8.6
Labor	Ron Davies	23,270	45.4	−7.9
Workers	Lance Buckingham	552	1.1	+1.1
National Country	Barry Whiley	328	0.6	+0.6
Total formal votes		51,281	98.4	
Informal votes		846	1.6	
Turnout		52,127	96.6	
Two-party-preferred result
Liberal	Ray Groom		53.8	+8.6
Labor	Ron Davies		46.2	−8.6
Liberal gain from Labor		Swing	+8.6	

=== Denison ===
This section is an excerpt from Electoral results for the Division of Denison § 1975

1975 Australian federal election: Denison
Party	Candidate	Votes	%	±%
Liberal	Michael Hodgman	26,253	53.2	+6.0
Labor	John Coates	22,104	44.8	−8.0
National Country	John Charles Hay	496	1.0	+1.0
Workers	Cathryn Marie Stanton	473	1.0	+1.0
Total formal votes		49,326	98.4	
Informal votes		808	1.6	
Turnout		50,134	95.7	
Two-party-preferred result
Liberal	Michael Hodgman		54.9	+7.7
Labor	John Coates		45.1	−7.7
Liberal gain from Labor		Swing	+7.7	

=== Franklin ===
This section is an excerpt from Electoral results for the Division of Franklin § 1975

1975 Australian federal election: Franklin
Party	Candidate	Votes	%	±%
Liberal	Bruce Goodluck	23,829	49.4	+12.3
Labor	Ray Sherry	23,011	47.7	−15.2
National Country	Margaret Franklin	966	2.0	+2.0
National Country	Joseph Hand	293	0.6	+0.6
Workers	Peter Mollon	171	0.4	+0.4
Total formal votes		48,270	97.9	
Informal votes		1,033	2.1	
Turnout		49,303	96.9	
Two-party-preferred result
Liberal	Bruce Goodluck	25,010	51.8	+14.7
Labor	Ray Sherry	23,260	48.2	−14.7
Liberal gain from Labor		Swing	+14.7	

=== Wilmot ===
This section is an excerpt from Electoral results for the Division of Wilmot § 1975

1975 Australian federal election: Wilmot
Party	Candidate	Votes	%	±%
Liberal	Max Burr	25,407	52.6	+5.3
Labor	Gil Duthie	21,365	44.2	−8.5
National Country	Robert Griffin	1,165	2.4	+2.4
Workers	William Woods	353	0.7	+0.7
Total formal votes		48,290	98.0	
Informal votes		1,005	2.0	
Turnout		49,295	97.2	
Two-party-preferred result
Liberal	Max Burr		55.3	+8.0
Labor	Gil Duthie		44.7	−8.0
Liberal gain from Labor		Swing	+8.0	

== Australian Capital Territory ==
1975 Australian federal election (Australian Capital Territory)
← 1974	13 December 1975	1977 →

All 2 ACT seats in the House of Representatives 1 seats needed for a majority
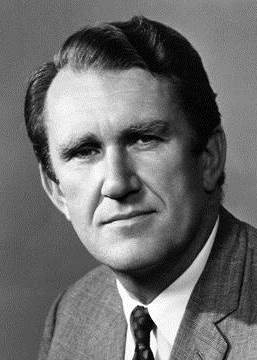

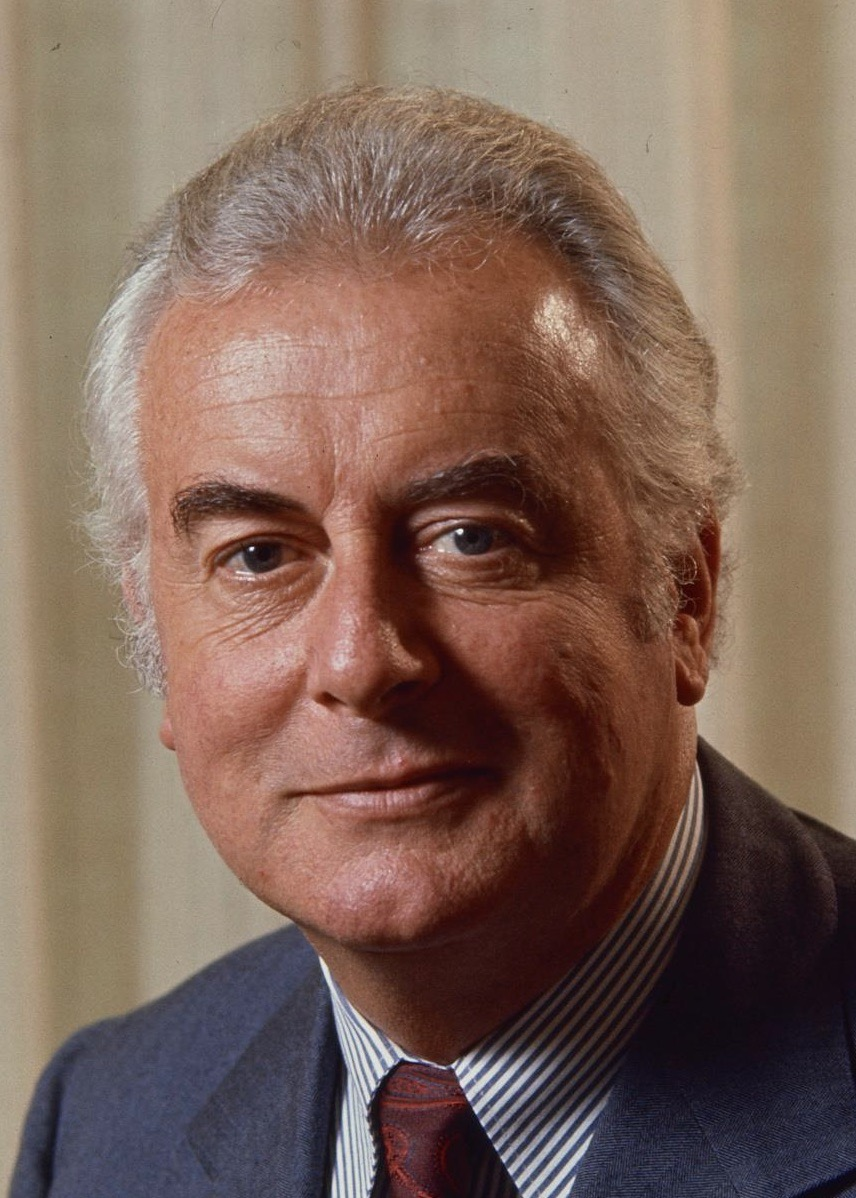
	First party	Second party
Leader	Malcolm Fraser	Gough Whitlam
Party	Coalition	Labor
Seats before	0	2
Seats won	1	1
Seat change	▲1	▼1
Popular vote	50,727	51,744
Percentage	46.5%	47.4%
TPP	50.7%	49.3%
TPP swing	▲10.4pp	▼10.4pp

=== Canberra ===
This section is an excerpt from Electoral results for the Division of Canberra § 1975

1975 Australian federal election: Canberra
Party	Candidate	Votes	%	±%
Liberal	John Haslem	25,697	49.4	+13.2
Labor	Kep Enderby	23,517	45.2	−8.6
Liberal Movement	Tony Harris	1,572	3.0	+3.0
Independent	Kevin Wise	434	0.8	+0.8
Independent	John Moloney	406	0.8	+0.8
Workers	Oleg Kavunenko	377	0.7	+0.7
Total formal votes		52,003	98.4	
Informal votes		853	1.6	
Turnout		52,856	93.9	
Two-party-preferred result
Liberal	John Haslem		53.3	+10.4
Labor	Kep Enderby		46.7	−10.4
Liberal gain from Labor		Swing	+10.4	

=== Fraser ===
This section is an excerpt from Electoral results for the Division of Fraser (Australian Capital Territory) § 1975

1975 Australian federal election: Fraser
Party	Candidate	Votes	%	±%
Labor	Ken Fry	28,227	51.1	−6.2
Liberal	George Mailath	25,030	45.3	+10.3
Liberal Movement	Claude Hammond	1,944	3.5	+3.5
Total formal votes		55,201	98.3	
Informal votes		969	1.7	
Turnout		56,170	94.2	
Two-party-preferred result
Labor	Ken Fry		52.0	−8.7
Liberal	George Mailath		48.0	+8.7
Labor hold		Swing	−8.7	

== Northern Territory ==
1975 Australian federal election (Northern Territory)
← 1974	13 December 1975	1977 →

Division of Northern Territory
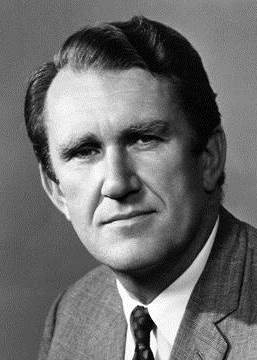

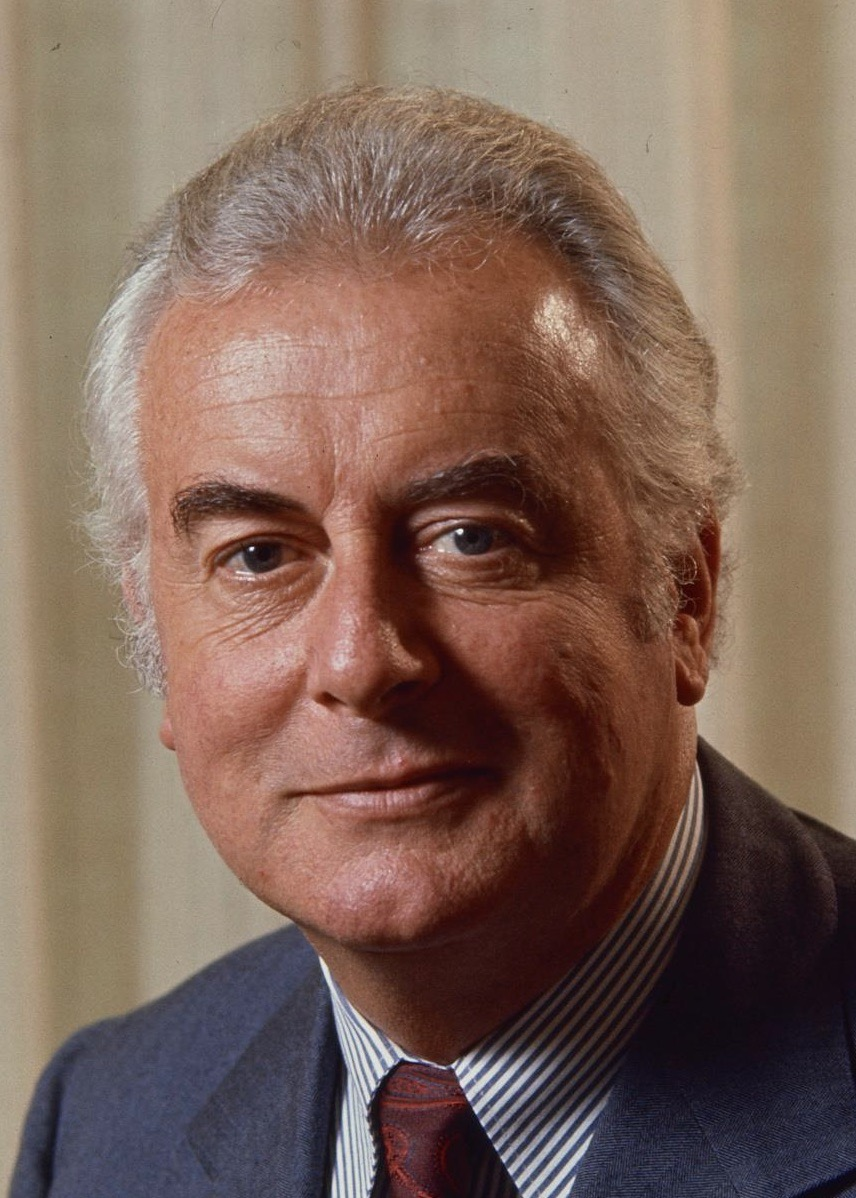
	First party	Second party
Leader	Malcolm Fraser	Gough Whitlam
Party	Coalition	Labor
Seats before	1	0
Seats won	1	0
Seat change	Steady	Steady
Popular vote	15,976	12,944
Percentage	53.9%	43.7%
Swing	▲4.6pp	▼2.1pp
TPP	54.9%	45.1%
TPP swing	▲2.2pp	▼1.8pp

This section is an excerpt from Electoral results for the Division of Northern Territory § 1975

1975 Australian federal election: Northern Territory
Party	Candidate	Votes	%	±%
Country Liberal	Sam Calder	15,976	53.9	+4.6
Labor	Jock Nelson	12,944	43.7	−1.8
Australia	James Forbes	701	2.4	+2.4
Total formal votes		29,621	96.7	
Informal votes		996	3.3	
Turnout		30,617	74.9	
Two-party-preferred result
Country Liberal	Sam Calder		54.9	+2.2
Labor	Jock Nelson		45.1	−2.2
Country Liberal hold		Swing	+2.2	

== See also ==
- Candidates of the 1975 Australian federal election
- Members of the Australian House of Representatives, 1975–1977
