= Electoral results for the Division of Cook =

Australian division election results

This is a list of electoral results for the Division of Cook in Australian federal elections from the electorate's creation in 1969 until the present.

== Members ==
| Member | Party | Term |
|---|---|---|
| Don Dobie | Liberal | 1969–1972 |
| Ray Thorburn | Labor | 1972–1975 |
| Don Dobie | Liberal | 1975–1996 |
| Stephen Mutch | Liberal | 1996–1998 |
| Bruce Baird | Liberal | 1998–2007 |
| Scott Morrison | Liberal | 2007–2024 |
| Simon Kennedy | Liberal | 2024–present |

== Election results ==
=== Elections in the 2020s ===
==== 2025 ====
2025 Australian federal election: Cook
| Party | Candidate | Votes | % | ±% |
|---|---|---|---|---|
| Liberal | Simon Kennedy | 51,121 | 48.06 | −5.66 |
| Labor | Simon Earle | 33,474 | 31.47 | +7.46 |
| Greens | Martin Moore | 10,575 | 9.94 | +0.50 |
| One Nation | Mark Preston | 4,638 | 4.36 | −0.06 |
| Family First | Natalie Fuller | 3,310 | 3.11 | +3.11 |
| Trumpet of Patriots | Sharon Hammond | 3,246 | 3.05 | +3.05 |
| Total formal votes | | 106,364 | 95.47 | −0.45 |
| Informal votes | | 5,044 | 4.53 | +0.45 |
| Turnout | | 111,408 | 93.68 | +1.79 |
Two-party-preferred result
| Liberal | Simon Kennedy | 60,834 | 57.19 | −4.43 |
| Labor | Simon Earle | 45,530 | 42.81 | +4.43 |
| Liberal hold | | Swing | −4.43 | |

==== 2024 by-election ====
On 16 April 2024 the Australian Electoral Commission declared Simon Kennedy officially elected as the new member for Cook.

2024 Cook by-election
| Party | Candidate | Votes | % | ±% |
|---|---|---|---|---|
| Liberal | Simon Kennedy | 53,799 | 62.67 | +7.14 |
| Greens | Martin Moore | 14,120 | 16.45 | +6.55 |
| Animal Justice | Natasha Brown | 5,841 | 6.80 | +6.80 |
| Libertarian | Vinay Kolhatkar | 5,117 | 5.96 | +5.96 |
| Independent | Roger Woodward | 4,920 | 5.73 | +5.73 |
| Sustainable Australia | Simone Gagatam | 2,054 | 2.39 | +2.39 |
| Total formal votes | | 85,851 | 93.24 | −2.36 |
| Informal votes | | 6,225 | 6.76 | +2.36 |
| Turnout | | 92,076 | 82.28 | −10.99 |
Two-candidate-preferred result
| Liberal | Simon Kennedy | 61,169 | 71.25 | +8.81 |
| Greens | Martin Moore | 24,682 | 28.75 | +28.75 |
| Liberal hold | | | | |

==== 2022 ====
2022 Australian federal election: Cook
| Party | Candidate | Votes | % | ±% |
|---|---|---|---|---|
| Liberal | Scott Morrison | 54,322 | 55.53 | −8.17 |
| Labor | Simon Earle | 24,444 | 24.99 | +1.89 |
| Greens | Catherine Dyson | 9,685 | 9.90 | +3.09 |
| One Nation | Gaye Cameron | 4,985 | 5.10 | +1.61 |
| United Australia | Jacqueline Guinane | 4,381 | 4.48 | +3.27 |
| Total formal votes | | 97,817 | 95.60 | +1.73 |
| Informal votes | | 4,498 | 4.40 | −1.73 |
| Turnout | | 102,315 | 92.83 | −0.82 |
Two-party-preferred result
| Liberal | Scott Morrison | 61,080 | 62.44 | −6.58 |
| Labor | Simon Earle | 36,737 | 37.56 | +6.58 |
| Liberal hold | | Swing | −6.58 | |

Alluvial diagram for preference flows in the seat of Cook in the 2022 federal election. The winning candidate got over 50% of first preference votes, so this alluvial diagram is indicative only, and preference flows were not used to determine the final result. The preference flows were used to determine the two-candidate-preferred.

=== Elections in the 2010s ===
==== 2019 ====
2019 Australian federal election: Cook
| Party | Candidate | Votes | % | ±% |
|---|---|---|---|---|
| Liberal | Scott Morrison | 59,895 | 63.70 | +5.35 |
| Labor | Simon O'Brien | 21,718 | 23.10 | −3.47 |
| Greens | Jon Doig | 6,406 | 6.81 | +0.03 |
| One Nation | Gaye Cameron | 3,277 | 3.49 | +3.49 |
| United Australia | John McSweyn | 1,135 | 1.21 | +1.21 |
| Christian Democrats | Roger Bolling | 1,041 | 1.11 | −3.74 |
| Conservative National | Peter Kelly | 551 | 0.59 | +0.59 |
| Total formal votes | | 94,023 | 93.87 | −0.96 |
| Informal votes | | 6,141 | 6.13 | +0.96 |
| Turnout | | 100,164 | 93.65 | +1.29 |
Two-party-preferred result
| Liberal | Scott Morrison | 64,894 | 69.02 | +3.63 |
| Labor | Simon O'Brien | 29,129 | 30.98 | −3.63 |
| Liberal hold | | Swing | +3.63 | |

==== 2016 ====
2016 Australian federal election: Cook
| Party | Candidate | Votes | % | ±% |
|---|---|---|---|---|
| Liberal | Scott Morrison | 53,321 | 58.35 | −1.41 |
| Labor | David Atkins | 24,283 | 26.57 | +0.44 |
| Greens | Nathan Hunt | 6,198 | 6.78 | +0.89 |
| Christian Democrats | George Capsis | 4,430 | 4.85 | +2.87 |
| Independent | John Brett | 3,153 | 3.45 | +3.45 |
| Total formal votes | | 91,385 | 94.83 | +1.95 |
| Informal votes | | 4,983 | 5.17 | −0.75 |
| Turnout | | 96,368 | 92.36 | −2.58 |
Two-party-preferred result
| Liberal | Scott Morrison | 59,760 | 65.39 | −0.32 |
| Labor | David Atkins | 31,625 | 34.61 | +0.32 |
| Liberal hold | | Swing | −0.32 | |

==== 2013 ====
2013 Australian federal election: Cook
| Party | Candidate | Votes | % | ±% |
|---|---|---|---|---|
| Liberal | Scott Morrison | 55,707 | 60.35 | +2.47 |
| Labor | Peter Scaysbrook | 22,850 | 24.76 | −4.05 |
| Greens | Mithra Cox | 6,058 | 6.56 | −1.17 |
| Palmer United | Matthew Palise | 3,765 | 4.08 | +4.08 |
| Christian Democrats | Beth Smith | 1,981 | 2.15 | +0.23 |
| Independent | Graeme Strang | 1,321 | 1.43 | −0.32 |
| Australia First | Jim Saleam | 617 | 0.67 | +0.67 |
| Total formal votes | | 92,299 | 94.08 | −0.11 |
| Informal votes | | 5,813 | 5.92 | +0.11 |
| Turnout | | 98,112 | 94.17 | −0.25 |
Two-party-preferred result
| Liberal | Scott Morrison | 61,244 | 66.35 | +3.69 |
| Labor | Peter Scaysbrook | 31,055 | 33.65 | −3.69 |
| Liberal hold | | Swing | +3.69 | |

==== 2010 ====
2010 Australian federal election: Cook
| Party | Candidate | Votes | % | ±% |
|---|---|---|---|---|
| Liberal | Scott Morrison | 51,852 | 57.88 | +5.73 |
| Labor | Peter Scaysbrook | 25,806 | 28.81 | −7.46 |
| Greens | Naomi Waizer | 6,924 | 7.73 | +1.54 |
| Christian Democrats | Beth Smith | 1,722 | 1.92 | −0.38 |
| Independent | Graeme Strang | 1,568 | 1.75 | +1.01 |
| One Nation | Richard Putral | 997 | 1.11 | −0.09 |
| Family First | Merelyn Foy | 719 | 0.80 | +0.08 |
| Total formal votes | | 89,588 | 94.19 | −2.00 |
| Informal votes | | 5,528 | 5.81 | +2.00 |
| Turnout | | 95,116 | 94.41 | −2.02 |
Two-party-preferred result
| Liberal | Scott Morrison | 56,138 | 62.66 | +6.32 |
| Labor | Peter Scaysbrook | 33,450 | 37.34 | −6.32 |
| Liberal hold | | Swing | +6.32 | |

=== Elections in the 2000s ===
==== 2007 ====
2007 Australian federal election: Cook
| Party | Candidate | Votes | % | ±% |
|---|---|---|---|---|
| Liberal | Scott Morrison | 45,116 | 52.40 | −5.11 |
| Labor | Mark Buttigieg | 30,921 | 35.91 | +7.69 |
| Greens | Naomi Waizer | 5,342 | 6.20 | −0.82 |
| Christian Democrats | Beth Smith | 1,929 | 2.24 | −0.17 |
| One Nation | Richard Putral | 1,116 | 1.30 | −0.63 |
| Independent | Graeme Strang | 693 | 0.80 | +0.23 |
| Family First | Ari Katsoulas | 596 | 0.69 | +0.69 |
| Independent | Patricia Poulos | 394 | 0.46 | +0.46 |
| Total formal votes | | 86,107 | 96.13 | +1.59 |
| Informal votes | | 3,465 | 3.87 | −1.59 |
| Turnout | | 89,572 | 95.91 | −0.18 |
Two-party-preferred result
| Liberal | Scott Morrison | 48,711 | 56.57 | −6.71 |
| Labor | Mark Buttigieg | 37,395 | 43.43 | +6.71 |
| Liberal hold | | Swing | −6.71 | |

==== 2004 ====
2004 Australian federal election: Cook
| Party | Candidate | Votes | % | ±% |
|---|---|---|---|---|
| Liberal | Bruce Baird | 43,161 | 58.03 | +1.81 |
| Labor | Mark Buttigieg | 20,593 | 27.69 | +1.20 |
| Greens | Corey Birtles | 5,144 | 6.92 | +3.36 |
| Christian Democrats | Beth Smith | 1,735 | 2.33 | +0.65 |
| One Nation | Andy Frew | 1,582 | 2.13 | −3.84 |
| No GST | Peter Phillips | 1,035 | 1.39 | +1.39 |
| Democrats | David Mendelssohn | 661 | 0.89 | −2.88 |
| Independent | Graeme Strang | 466 | 0.63 | +0.06 |
| Total formal votes | | 74,377 | 94.47 | −0.88 |
| Informal votes | | 4,350 | 5.53 | +0.88 |
| Turnout | | 78,727 | 95.22 | −0.06 |
Two-party-preferred result
| Liberal | Bruce Baird | 47,470 | 63.82 | −0.18 |
| Labor | Mark Buttigieg | 26,907 | 36.18 | +0.18 |
| Liberal hold | | Swing | −0.18 | |

==== 2001 ====
2001 Australian federal election: Cook
| Party | Candidate | Votes | % | ±% |
|---|---|---|---|---|
| Liberal | Bruce Baird | 41,959 | 56.22 | +6.14 |
| Labor | Peri Young | 19,768 | 26.49 | −4.60 |
| One Nation | Andy Frew | 4,453 | 5.97 | −2.36 |
| Democrats | Alison Bailey | 2,815 | 3.77 | −0.50 |
| Greens | Cathy Peters-Power | 2,655 | 3.56 | +1.38 |
| Christian Democrats | Malcolm Smith | 1,256 | 1.68 | +0.43 |
| AAFI | Peter James | 852 | 1.14 | +1.14 |
| Independent | Patricia Poulos | 453 | 0.61 | +0.61 |
| Independent | Graeme Strang | 423 | 0.57 | +0.57 |
| Total formal votes | | 74,634 | 95.35 | −0.62 |
| Informal votes | | 3,640 | 4.65 | +0.62 |
| Turnout | | 78,274 | 96.06 | |
Two-party-preferred result
| Liberal | Bruce Baird | 47,768 | 64.00 | +4.63 |
| Labor | Peri Young | 26,866 | 36.00 | −4.63 |
| Liberal hold | | Swing | +4.63 | |

=== Elections in the 1990s ===
==== 1998 ====
1998 Australian federal election: Cook
| Party | Candidate | Votes | % | ±% |
|---|---|---|---|---|
| Liberal | Bruce Baird | 37,075 | 50.22 | −4.88 |
| Labor | Peri Young | 22,850 | 30.95 | −0.44 |
| One Nation | Gareth Kimberley | 6,144 | 8.32 | +8.32 |
| Democrats | Terri Richardson | 3,147 | 4.26 | −3.86 |
| Greens | John Kaye | 1,556 | 2.11 | +2.11 |
| Unity | Zanthe Abdurahman | 1,103 | 1.49 | +1.49 |
| Independent | Darren Boehm | 997 | 1.35 | +1.35 |
| Christian Democrats | Malcolm Smith | 948 | 1.28 | +1.28 |
| Total formal votes | | 73,820 | 95.97 | −1.55 |
| Informal votes | | 3,103 | 4.03 | +1.55 |
| Turnout | | 76,923 | 95.28 | −1.49 |
Two-party-preferred result
| Liberal | Bruce Baird | 43,510 | 58.94 | −3.34 |
| Labor | Peri Young | 30,310 | 41.06 | +3.34 |
| Liberal hold | | Swing | −3.34 | |

==== 1996 ====
1996 Australian federal election: Cook
| Party | Candidate | Votes | % | ±% |
|---|---|---|---|---|
| Liberal | Stephen Mutch | 41,601 | 55.10 | +5.52 |
| Labor | Mark McGrath | 23,704 | 31.40 | −9.07 |
| Democrats | Terri Richardson | 6,130 | 8.12 | +5.12 |
| Reclaim Australia | Janey Woodger | 2,988 | 3.96 | +3.96 |
| Independent | James Ian McDonald | 1,078 | 1.43 | +1.43 |
| Total formal votes | | 75,501 | 97.52 | +0.01 |
| Informal votes | | 1,922 | 2.48 | −0.01 |
| Turnout | | 77,423 | 96.77 | −0.02 |
Two-party-preferred result
| Liberal | Stephen Mutch | 46,791 | 62.28 | +8.81 |
| Labor | Mark McGrath | 28,343 | 37.72 | −8.81 |
| Liberal hold | | Swing | +8.81 | |

==== 1993 ====
1993 Australian federal election: Cook
| Party | Candidate | Votes | % | ±% |
|---|---|---|---|---|
| Liberal | Don Dobie | 36,524 | 49.58 | +0.11 |
| Labor | Noreen Solomon | 29,806 | 40.46 | +5.87 |
| Independent | Alex Elphinston | 2,300 | 3.12 | +3.12 |
| Democrats | Terri Richardson | 2,212 | 3.00 | −6.94 |
| Call to Australia | Warren Kinny | 1,813 | 2.46 | +2.46 |
| Natural Law | Julie Atkinson | 530 | 0.72 | +0.72 |
| Confederate Action | Tom Thompson | 479 | 0.65 | +0.65 |
| Total formal votes | | 73,664 | 97.51 | −0.18 |
| Informal votes | | 1,882 | 2.49 | +0.18 |
| Turnout | | 75,546 | 96.79 | |
Two-party-preferred result
| Liberal | Don Dobie | 39,367 | 53.47 | −2.95 |
| Labor | Noreen Solomon | 34,261 | 46.53 | +2.95 |
| Liberal hold | | Swing | −2.95 | |

==== 1990 ====
1990 Australian federal election: Cook
| Party | Candidate | Votes | % | ±% |
|---|---|---|---|---|
| Liberal | Don Dobie | 32,654 | 50.2 | −3.5 |
| Labor | Paul Smith | 22,034 | 33.9 | −6.5 |
| Democrats | Terri Richardson | 6,368 | 9.8 | +3.9 |
| Independent | Dennis Ralph | 2,644 | 4.1 | +4.1 |
| Centre Unity | Patricia Poulos | 1,342 | 2.1 | +2.1 |
| Total formal votes | | 65,042 | 97.7 | |
| Informal votes | | 1,549 | 2.3 | |
| Turnout | | 66,591 | 96.2 | |
Two-party-preferred result
| Liberal | Don Dobie | 37,142 | 57.3 | +1.2 |
| Labor | Paul Smith | 27,721 | 42.7 | −1.2 |
| Liberal hold | | Swing | +1.2 | |

=== Elections in the 1980s ===
==== 1987 ====
1987 Australian federal election: Cook
| Party | Candidate | Votes | % | ±% |
|---|---|---|---|---|
| Liberal | Don Dobie | 34,590 | 53.7 | +1.2 |
| Labor | Michael Addison | 25,987 | 40.4 | −1.4 |
| Democrats | Mark Freeman | 3,805 | 5.9 | +0.2 |
| Total formal votes | | 64,382 | 96.9 | |
| Informal votes | | 2,083 | 3.1 | |
| Turnout | | 66,465 | 96.1 | |
Two-party-preferred result
| Liberal | Don Dobie | 36,092 | 56.1 | +0.7 |
| Labor | Michael Addison | 28,290 | 43.9 | −0.7 |
| Liberal hold | | Swing | +0.7 | |

==== 1984 ====
1984 Australian federal election: Cook
| Party | Candidate | Votes | % | ±% |
|---|---|---|---|---|
| Liberal | Don Dobie | 32,915 | 52.5 | +3.0 |
| Labor | Peter McIlwaine | 26,153 | 41.8 | −6.9 |
| Democrats | Brett Gooley | 3,572 | 5.7 | +5.7 |
| Total formal votes | | 62,640 | 95.6 | |
| Informal votes | | 2,891 | 4.4 | |
| Turnout | | 65,531 | 95.4 | |
Two-party-preferred result
| Liberal | Don Dobie | 34,699 | 55.4 | +4.8 |
| Labor | Peter McIlwaine | 27,941 | 44.6 | −4.8 |
| Liberal hold | | Swing | +4.8 | |

==== 1983 ====
1983 Australian federal election: Cook
| Party | Candidate | Votes | % | ±% |
|---|---|---|---|---|
| Labor | Michael Addison | 34,803 | 49.2 | +8.5 |
| Liberal | Don Dobie | 34,666 | 49.0 | −3.1 |
| Progress | Henry Soper | 1,213 | 1.7 | +0.8 |
| Total formal votes | | 70,682 | 98.6 | |
| Informal votes | | 1,022 | 1.4 | |
| Turnout | | 71,704 | 96.4 | |
Two-party-preferred result
| Liberal | Don Dobie | 35,415 | 50.1 | −5.0 |
| Labor | Michael Addison | 35,267 | 49.9 | +5.0 |
| Liberal hold | | Swing | −5.0 | |

==== 1980 ====
1980 Australian federal election: Cook
| Party | Candidate | Votes | % | ±% |
|---|---|---|---|---|
| Liberal | Don Dobie | 36,347 | 52.1 | +0.5 |
| Labor | Ray Thorburn | 28,422 | 40.7 | +3.8 |
| Democrats | Alexander Kiss | 4,391 | 6.3 | −4.1 |
| Progress | Henry Soper | 654 | 0.9 | −0.2 |
| Total formal votes | | 69,814 | 98.2 | |
| Informal votes | | 1,295 | 1.8 | |
| Turnout | | 71,109 | 95.6 | |
Two-party-preferred result
| Liberal | Don Dobie | | 55.1 | −3.2 |
| Labor | Ray Thorburn | | 44.9 | +3.2 |
| Liberal hold | | Swing | −3.2 | |

=== Elections in the 1970s ===
==== 1977 ====
1977 Australian federal election: Cook
| Party | Candidate | Votes | % | ±% |
|---|---|---|---|---|
| Liberal | Don Dobie | 35,648 | 51.6 | −4.4 |
| Labor | Ray Thorburn | 25,511 | 36.9 | −3.6 |
| Democrats | Walter Day | 7,162 | 10.4 | +10.4 |
| Progress | Henry Soper | 791 | 1.1 | −0.4 |
| Total formal votes | | 69,112 | 98.5 | |
| Informal votes | | 1,024 | 1.5 | |
| Turnout | | 70,136 | 96.6 | |
Two-party-preferred result
| Liberal | Don Dobie | | 58.3 | +0.5 |
| Labor | Ray Thorburn | | 41.7 | −0.5 |
| Liberal hold | | Swing | +0.5 | |

==== 1975 ====
1975 Australian federal election: Cook
| Party | Candidate | Votes | % | ±% |
|---|---|---|---|---|
| Liberal | Don Dobie | 34,334 | 56.0 | +7.3 |
| Labor | Ray Thorburn | 24,857 | 40.5 | −8.0 |
| Workers | Robert Schollbach | 924 | 1.5 | +1.5 |
| Australia | Marjorie Gray | 714 | 1.2 | −1.4 |
| Independent | Marc Aussie-Stone | 376 | 0.6 | +0.6 |
| Independent | Philip O'Neill | 105 | 0.2 | +0.2 |
| Total formal votes | | 61,310 | 98.6 | |
| Informal votes | | 863 | 1.4 | |
| Turnout | | 62,173 | 96.6 | |
Two-party-preferred result
| Liberal | Don Dobie | | 57.8 | +8.3 |
| Labor | Ray Thorburn | | 42.2 | −8.3 |
| Liberal gain from Labor | | Swing | +8.3 | |

==== 1974 ====
1974 Australian federal election: Cook
| Party | Candidate | Votes | % | ±% |
|---|---|---|---|---|
| Liberal | Don Dobie | 29,142 | 48.7 | +3.2 |
| Labor | Ray Thorburn | 29,008 | 48.5 | +2.0 |
| Australia | Milo Dunphy | 1,555 | 2.6 | −1.5 |
| Independent | Ronald Gallagher | 167 | 0.3 | +0.0 |
| Total formal votes | | 59,872 | 99.0 | |
| Informal votes | | 587 | 1.0 | |
| Turnout | | 60,459 | 96.8 | |
Two-party-preferred result
| Labor | Ray Thorburn | 30,265 | 50.5 | −0.2 |
| Liberal | Don Dobie | 29,607 | 49.5 | +0.2 |
| Labor hold | | Swing | −0.2 | |

==== 1972 ====
1972 Australian federal election: Cook
| Party | Candidate | Votes | % | ±% |
|---|---|---|---|---|
| Labor | Ray Thorburn | 25,037 | 46.5 | +2.9 |
| Liberal | Don Dobie | 24,527 | 45.5 | −3.6 |
| Australia | Marjorie Gray | 2,230 | 4.1 | +2.3 |
| Democratic Labor | Bernard Forshaw | 1,232 | 2.3 | +2.3 |
| Defence of Government Schools | Judith Sainsbury | 674 | 1.3 | +1.3 |
| Independent | Ronald Gallagher | 153 | 0.3 | +0.3 |
| Total formal votes | | 53,853 | 98.5 | |
| Informal votes | | 800 | 1.5 | |
| Turnout | | 54,653 | 96.5 | |
Two-party-preferred result
| Labor | Ray Thorburn | 27,298 | 50.7 | +3.5 |
| Liberal | Don Dobie | 26,555 | 49.3 | −3.5 |
| Labor gain from Liberal | | Swing | +3.5 | |

=== Elections in the 1960s ===
==== 1969 ====
1969 Australian federal election: Cook
| Party | Candidate | Votes | % | ±% |
|---|---|---|---|---|
| Liberal | Don Dobie | 24,997 | 49.2 | −5.9 |
| Labor | Cliff Mallam | 22,192 | 43.6 | +1.2 |
| Independent | Robin Alleway | 2,766 | 5.4 | +5.4 |
| Australia | Bernard Walrut | 907 | 1.8 | +1.8 |
| Total formal votes | | 50,862 | 98.5 | |
| Informal votes | | 797 | 1.5 | |
| Turnout | | 51,659 | 95.8 | |
Two-party-preferred result
| Liberal | Don Dobie | 26,861 | 52.8 | −4.5 |
| Labor | Cliff Mallam | 24,001 | 47.2 | +4.5 |
| Liberal notional hold | | Swing | −4.5 | |
