= Ray Thorburn =

Australian politician

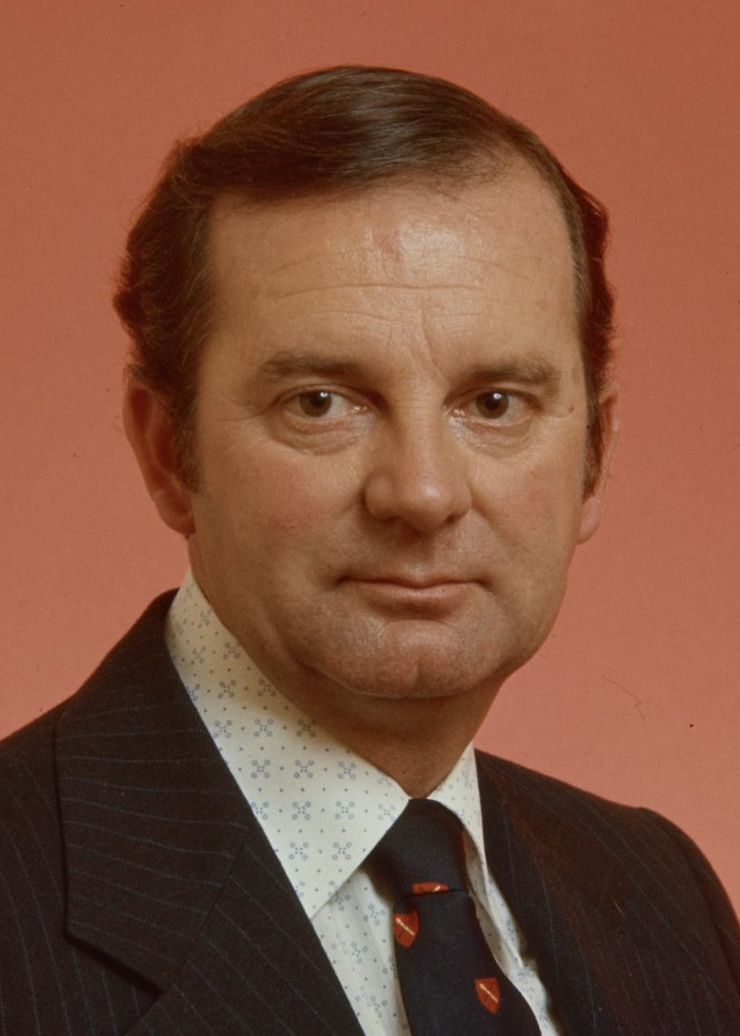
- Thorburn in 1974

Member of the Australian Parliament for Cook
- In office 2 December 1972 – 13 December 1975
- Preceded by: Don Dobie
- Succeeded by: Don Dobie

Personal details
- Born: 15 November 1930 Sutherland, New South Wales, Australia
- Died: 30 January 1986 (aged 55)
- Party: Labor
- Occupation: Electrical engineer

Raymond William Thorburn (15 November 1930 – 30 January 1986) was an Australian politician. He was a member of the Australian Labor Party (ALP) and held the New South Wales seat of Cook in the House of Representatives from 1972 to 1975. He was an electrical engineer by profession.

== Early life ==
Thorburn was born on 15 November 1930 in Sutherland, New South Wales. He completed a certificate in electrical engineering at Sydney Technical College and subsequently worked as an engineering officer.

== Politics ==
Thorburn served on the Sutherland Shire Council from 1964 to 1973, including as shire president from 1971 to 1972. He was also vice-president of the Cronulla branch of the ALP from 1956 to 1970.

At the 1972 federal election, Thorburn defeated the incumbent Liberal MP Don Dobie in the seat of Cook. He was re-elected in 1974 but lost his seat to Dobie in the ALP's landslide defeat at the 1975 election. He made three unsuccessful attempts to reclaim the seat from Dobie, and remains the only member of the ALP to have held Cook.

Thorburn was a member of the House Standing Committee on Aboriginal Affairs from 1973 to 1975 and was a parliamentary representative on the Australian Institute of Aboriginal Studies.

== Personal life ==
Thorburn had two children with his wife Joan. He died on 30 January 1986 at the age of 55.

Parliament of Australia
Preceded by Don Dobie	Member for Cook; 1972–1975	Succeeded by Don Dobie
