= Don Dobie =

Australian politician

The Honourable Don Dobie
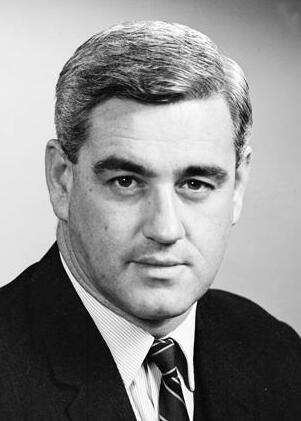
- Dobie in 1970

Member of the Australian Parliament for Hughes
- In office 26 November 1966 – 25 October 1969
- Preceded by: Les Johnson
- Succeeded by: Les Johnson

Member of the Australian Parliament for Cook
- In office 25 October 1969 – 2 December 1972
- Preceded by: New seat
- Succeeded by: Ray Thorburn
- In office 13 December 1975 – 29 January 1996
- Preceded by: Ray Thorburn
- Succeeded by: Stephen Mutch

Personal details
- Born: 28 July 1927 Glasgow, Scotland
- Died: 25 November 1996 (aged 69) New South Wales, Australia
- Party: Liberal
- Education: University of Melbourne; Columbia University
- Occupation: Banker

James Donald Mathieson Dobie (28 July 1927 – 25 November 1996) was an Australian politician. He was a member of the Liberal Party and served in the House of Representatives for over 25 years, representing the seats of Hughes (1966–1969) and Cook (1969–1972, 1975–1996). He was an assistant minister during the McMahon government (1971–1972). Prior to entering politics he worked for the Bank of New South Wales.

== Early life ==
Dobie was born on 28 July 1927 in Glasgow, Scotland. He was the only child of Annie Burns (née Mathieson) and Alexander Dobie. The family moved to Australia the following year, arriving in Brisbane in February 1928. They settled in the suburb of Newstead, Queensland, and his father found work as a fitter and engineer.

Dobie was educated at Ascot State School and Brisbane Grammar School. He left school in 1943 and joined the Bank of New South Wales, working in branches around Queensland. He was called up for national service with the Citizens Military Force in 1951 and served as a gunner with the 2nd Light Artillery Regiment. In 1953, Dobie was transferred to Melbourne where he worked in the bank's economics section. He was able to study part-time at the University of Melbourne and graduated Bachelor of Arts in 1961. He subsequently spent a year in the United States obtaining a Master of Business Administration from Columbia University. After returning to Australia he was transferred to Sydney and became manager of the bank's Sylvania branch.

== Politics ==
Dobie was president of the Liberal Party's Woolooware branch from 1964 to 1966. He was first elected to the party's state council in New South Wales in 1965 and also served terms on the state executive and as a delegate to federal council.

At the 1966 federal election, Dobie was elected to the Australian House of Representatives for the Liberal Party, defeating Labor member Les Johnson for the seat of Hughes. A redistribution ahead of the 1969 election carved the new seat of Cook mostly out of the more Liberal-friendly eastern portion of Hughes. The redistribution erased Dobie's majority in Hughes and gave Labor a notional eight-percent majority, turning it from a marginal Liberal seat into a fairly safe Labor seat on paper. Believing this made Hughes unwinnable—especially with Johnson priming for a rematch—Dobie transferred to Cook. This move proved prescient, as Johnson retook Hughes for Labor on a large swing while Dobie narrowly won Cook.

On 20 August 1971, he was appointed Assistant Minister assisting the Prime Minister, William McMahon. In 1972, he was defeated by Labor's Ray Thorburn, but retook the seat in 1975 and was returned at every election until his retirement in 1996. He died later the same year.

Dobie was the Chief Opposition Whip in the House of Representatives from 1983 to 1985.

In 1993 he was the Coalition candidate for Speaker of the House of Representatives but the nomination was of a symbolic nature as the Coalition had just lost an election earlier that year and Dobie was defeated on party lines by the Labor Government's candidate Stephen Martin by a vote of 78 to 63.

== Personal life ==
Dobie was in a long-term relationship with physician George Burniston. The pair met in the 1950s and initially lived in Dobie's South Yarra flat, before moving to Sydney and settling in Burniston's Cronulla apartment. Burniston died in 1992, with Dobie acknowledged in his obituary as a "life long friend and close companion". His parliamentary colleague Chris Puplick later acknowledged the "deep personal friendship" between the pair in a eulogy for Dobie. He was occasionally subjected to homophobic remarks in parliament, and it has been suggested that his homosexuality may have inhibited his chances of a ministerial appointment.

Dobie died on 25 November 1996 at the age of 69, less than a year after leaving parliament. His death was caused by a heart attack resulting from complications of diabetes. He was granted a state funeral at Cronulla Presbyterian Community Church.

Parliament of Australia
Preceded by Les Johnson	Member for Hughes; 1966–1969	Succeeded by Les Johnson
Preceded by new seat	Member for Cook; 1969–1972	Succeeded by Ray Thorburn
Preceded by Ray Thorburn	Member for Cook; 1975–1996	Succeeded by Stephen Mutch
