= Electoral results for the Division of Evans =

Australian division election results

This is a list of electoral results for the Division of Evans in Australian federal elections from the division's creation in 1949 until its abolition in 1977.

== Members ==
Member	Party	Term
Frederick Osborne	Liberal	1949—1961
James Monaghan	Labor	1961—1963
Malcolm Mackay	Liberal	1963—1972
Allan Mulder	Labor	1972—1975
John Abel	Liberal	1975—1977

== Election results ==
=== Elections in the 1970s ===
==== 1975 ====
1975 Australian federal election: Evans
Party	Candidate	Votes	%	±%
Liberal	John Abel	29,762	51.1	+7.5
Labor	Allan Mulder	27,357	46.9	−6.0
Australia	Graham Roll	489	0.8	−1.0
Independent	Warren Wilson	421	0.7	+0.7
Independent	Frederick Keoghan	254	0.4	+0.4
Total formal votes		58,283	97.9	
Informal votes		1,273	2.1	
Turnout		59,556	94.5	
Two-party-preferred result
Liberal	John Abel		52.0	+6.9
Labor	Allan Mulder		48.0	−6.9
Liberal gain from Labor		Swing	+6.9	

==== 1974 ====
1974 Australian federal election: Evans
Party	Candidate	Votes	%	±%
Labor	Allan Mulder	29,502	52.9	+4.7
Liberal	John Abel	24,299	43.6	+3.2
Independent	John McGarity	991	1.8	+1.8
Australia	Paul Flottmann	977	1.8	−3.2
Total formal votes		55,769	97.6	
Informal votes		1,379	2.4	
Turnout		57,148	94.9	
Two-party-preferred result
Labor	Allan Mulder		54.9	+2.2
Liberal	John Abel		45.1	−2.2
Labor hold		Swing	+2.2	

==== 1972 ====
1972 Australian federal election: Evans
Party	Candidate	Votes	%	±%
Labor	Allan Mulder	25,623	48.2	+2.8
Liberal	Malcolm Mackay	21,453	40.4	−4.0
Australia	John Dease	2,644	5.0	+2.1
Independent	Noel MacDonald	1,714	3.2	+3.2
Democratic Labor	Gary Doherty	1,705	3.2	−2.1
Total formal votes		53,139	97.2	
Informal votes		1,536	2.8	
Turnout		54,675	94.3	
Two-party-preferred result
Labor	Allan Mulder	28,021	52.7	+3.9
Liberal	Malcolm Mackay	25,118	47.3	−3.9
Labor gain from Liberal		Swing	+3.9	

=== Elections in the 1960s ===
==== 1969 ====
1969 Australian federal election: Evans
Party	Candidate	Votes	%	±%
Labor	James Monaghan	24,054	45.4	+8.9
Liberal	Malcolm Mackay	23,527	44.4	−8.1
Democratic Labor	Kevin Davis	2,798	5.3	+0.3
Australia	John Fisher	1,550	2.9	+2.9
Independent	Hal Saunders	1,010	1.9	+1.9
Total formal votes		52,939	96.4	
Informal votes		1,950	3.6	
Turnout		54,889	93.5	
Two-party-preferred result
Liberal	Malcolm Mackay	27,100	51.2	−9.0
Labor	James Monaghan	25,839	48.8	+9.0
Liberal hold		Swing	−9.0	

==== 1966 ====
1966 Australian federal election: Evans
Party	Candidate	Votes	%	±%
Liberal	Malcolm Mackay	20,342	55.1	+4.0
Labor	James Monaghan	12,857	34.9	−7.1
Democratic Labor	Francis Collins	2,071	5.6	−0.4
Liberal Reform Group	John Gunn	1,619	4.4	+4.4
Total formal votes		36,889	96.5	
Informal votes		1,327	3.5	
Turnout		38,216	93.7	
Two-party-preferred result
Liberal	Malcolm Mackay		61.8	+5.2
Labor	James Monaghan		38.2	−5.2
Liberal hold		Swing	+5.2	

==== 1963 ====
1963 Australian federal election: Evans
Party	Candidate	Votes	%	±%
Liberal	Malcolm Mackay	19,306	51.1	+5.0
Labor	James Monaghan	15,863	42.0	−3.3
Democratic Labor	Jack Kane	2,263	6.0	−0.8
Independent	Harold O'Reilly	187	0.5	+0.5
Independent	Stanislaus Kelly	177	0.5	+0.5
Total formal votes		37,796	97.8	
Informal votes		847	2.2	
Turnout		38,643	95.8	
Two-party-preferred result
Liberal	Malcolm Mackay		56.6	+6.7
Labor	James Monaghan		43.4	−6.7
Liberal gain from Labor		Swing	+6.7	

==== 1961 ====
1961 Australian federal election: Evans
Party	Candidate	Votes	%	±%
Liberal	Frederick Osborne	17,623	46.1	−5.9
Labor	James Monaghan	17,305	45.3	+3.5
Democratic Labor	Francis Collins	2,580	6.8	+0.6
Independent	Harold O'Reilly	702	1.8	+1.8
Total formal votes		38,210	97.3	
Informal votes		1,051	2.7	
Turnout		39,261	95.0	
Two-party-preferred result
Labor	James Monaghan	19,141	50.1	+7.1
Liberal	Frederick Osborne	19,069	49.9	−7.1
Labor gain from Liberal		Swing	+7.1	

=== Elections in the 1950s ===
==== 1958 ====
1958 Australian federal election: Evans
Party	Candidate	Votes	%	±%
Liberal	Frederick Osborne	20,488	52.0	−8.9
Labor	James Monaghan	16,482	41.8	+2.7
Democratic Labor	Lawrence Pedemont	2,440	6.2	+6.2
Total formal votes		39,410	97.1	
Informal votes		1,170	2.9	
Turnout		40,580	95.3	
Two-party-preferred result
Liberal	Frederick Osborne		57.0	−3.9
Labor	James Monaghan		43.0	+3.9
Liberal hold		Swing	−3.9	

==== 1955 ====
1955 Australian federal election: Evans
Party	Candidate	Votes	%	±%
Liberal	Frederick Osborne	25,236	60.9	+7.6
Labor	Sidney Pollard	16,179	39.1	−7.6
Total formal votes		41,415	97.1	
Informal votes		1,228	2.9	
Turnout		42,643	95.7	
Liberal hold		Swing	+7.6	

==== 1954 ====
1954 Australian federal election: Evans
Party	Candidate	Votes	%	±%
Liberal	Frederick Osborne	19,413	55.0	−3.6
Labor	Robert Bailey	15,876	45.0	+3.6
Total formal votes		35,289	98.9	
Informal votes		397	1.1	
Turnout		35,686	96.0	
Liberal hold		Swing	−3.6	

==== 1951 ====
1951 Australian federal election: Evans
Party	Candidate	Votes	%	±%
Liberal	Frederick Osborne	21,936	58.6	+2.0
Labor	Robert Bailey	15,467	41.4	−2.0
Total formal votes		37,403	98.3	
Informal votes		666	1.7	
Turnout		38,069	96.3	
Liberal hold		Swing	+2.0	

=== Elections in the 1940s ===
==== 1949 ====
1949 Australian federal election: Evans
Party	Candidate	Votes	%	±%
Liberal	Frederick Osborne	21,616	56.6	+5.6
Labor	Ronald Nicholls	16,588	43.4	−5.6
Total formal votes		38,204	98.1	
Informal votes		734	1.9	
Turnout		38,938	96.8	
Liberal notional hold		Swing	+5.6	
