= Candidates of the 1975 Australian federal election =

This article provides information on candidates who stood for the 1975 Australian federal election. The election was held on 13 December 1975.

== Seat changes ==
- Two Senate seats each were created for the Australian Capital and Northern Territories.
- The member for Higgins, John Gorton (Independent), contested the Senate in the ACT.

== Retiring Members and Senators ==
=== Labor ===
- Jim Cope MP (Sydney, NSW)
- Fred Daly MP (Grayndler, NSW)
- Bill Fulton MP (Leichhardt, Qld)
- Tony Luchetti MP (Macquarie, NSW)
- Len Reynolds MP (Barton, NSW)
- Senator George Poyser (Vic)
- Senator Don Willesee (WA)

=== Liberal ===
- Nigel Drury MP (Ryan, Qld)
- Dudley Erwin MP (Ballaarat, Vic)
- David Fairbairn MP (Farrer, NSW)
- Jim Forbes MP (Barker, SA)
- Senator Sir Kenneth Anderson (NSW)
- Senator John Marriott (Tas)

=== National Country ===
- John England MP (Calare, NSW)
- Senator Ellis Lawrie (Qld)

=== Independent ===
- Senator Cleaver Bunton (NSW)

== House of Representatives ==
Sitting members at the time of the election are shown in bold text. Successful candidates are highlighted in the relevant colour. Where there is possible confusion, an asterisk (*) is also used.

=== Australian Capital Territory ===
Electorate	Held by	Labor candidate	Liberal candidate	LM candidate	Other candidates
Canberra	Labor	**Kep Enderby**	John Haslem	Tony Harris	Oleg Kavunenko (WP); John Moloney (Ind); Kevin Wise (Ind)
Fraser	Labor	**Ken Fry**	George Mailath	Claude Hammond	

=== New South Wales ===
Electorate	Held by	Labor candidate	Coalition candidate	Other candidates
Banks	Labor	**Vince Martin**	Maxwell Gibson (Lib)	Denise Arrow (Ind); Ralph Skelton (WP)
Barton	Labor	Murray Gainsford	Jim Bradfield (Lib)	Maxwell Shean (WP); Clifford Willard (AP)
Bennelong	Liberal	Noel Welsman	**John Howard** (Lib)	John Anlezark (Ind); Brian Johnson (AP)
Berowra	Liberal	Michael Ross	**Harry Edwards** (Lib)	Robert Howard (WP)
Blaxland	Labor	**Paul Keating**	Joseph Touma (Lib)	Robert Symes (WP)
Bradfield	Liberal	John Carmody	**David Connolly** (Lib)	Christopher Brown (WP)
Calare	NCP	Francis Hall	James Ashton (Lib); Sandy Mackenzie* (NCP)	
Chifley	Labor	**John Armitage**	Shirley Sookee (Lib)	
Cook	Labor	**Ray Thorburn**	Don Dobie (Lib)	Marc Aussie-Stone (Ind); Marjorie Gray (AP); Philip O'Neill (Ind); Robert Schollbach (WP)
Cowper	NCP	Colin Clague	**Ian Robinson** (NCP)	John Holcombe (Ind); John McLachlan (Ind)
Cunningham	Labor	**Rex Connor**	Peter Swan (Lib)	Bernard Groben (Ind); Peter Robertson (WP)
Darling	Labor	**John FitzPatrick**	Walter Mitchell (NCP)	Walter Miller (Ind)
Eden-Monaro	Labor	**Bob Whan**	John Moore (NCP); Murray Sainsbury* (Lib)	Frederick Dawson (Ind)
Evans	Labor	**Allan Mulder**	John Abel (Lib)	Frederick Keoghan (Ind); Graham Roll (AP); Warren Wilson (Ind)
Farrer	Liberal	Patrick Brassil	Kevin Bowtell (NCP); Wal Fife* (Lib)	Mike Donelan (AP); Anthony Quinn (DLP); Arthur Robinson (WP)
Grayndler	Labor	Tony Whitlam	Jonathan Fowler (Lib)	Peter Dowd (Ind); Graeme Shortland (Ind); Douglas Spedding (Ind)
Gwydir	NCP	Francis Bourke	**Ralph Hunt** (NCP)	Norbert Hennessy (Ind); William O'Donnell (Ind)
Hughes	Labor	**Les Johnson**	Robert Law (Lib)	
Hume	NCP	George Brenner	**Stephen Lusher** (NCP)	
Hunter	Labor	**Bert James**	Stephen Walker (Lib)	
Kingsford-Smith	Labor	**Lionel Bowen**	Desmond Connors (Lib)	Nicholas Confos (Ind)
Lang	Labor	**Frank Stewart**	Donald Carruthers (Lib)	Marc Aussie-Stone (Ind); Douglas Morgan (Ind); John Stewart (Ind)
Lowe	Liberal	Robert Hyde	**William McMahon** (Lib)	Clifford Bros (AP); Ben Doig (Ind); Andris Kichno (WP); Bent Poulsen (Ind)
Lyne	NCP	Bruce Langford	**Philip Lucock** (NCP)	Peter Simpson (Ind)
Macarthur	Labor	**John Kerin**	Michael Baume (Lib)	Ramon Barros (WP); Susan Healy (AP); Barry Watkinson (Ind)
Mackellar	Liberal	Kevin Mason	**Bill Wentworth** (Lib)	Barry Bracken (WP); Jennifer Sheehan (Ind)
Macquarie	Labor	Ross Free	Reg Gillard (Lib)	Murray Busch (WP); Norman Lee (Ind); Ian Perry (Ind)
Mitchell	Liberal	David Savage	**Alan Cadman** (Lib)	Ivor F (Ind); Dimitar Mikusalev (Ind); Alexander Munro (AP); Duncan Yuille (WP)
New England	NCP	John Shanahan	**Ian Sinclair** (NCP)	Geoffrey Anderson (Ind)
Newcastle	Labor	**Charles Jones**	Arthur Thomas (Lib)	David Ross (CPA)
North Sydney	Liberal	Patrick Healy	**Bill Graham** (Lib)	Romualds Kemps (Ind); Peter Sawyer (WP)
Parramatta	Liberal	John Brown	**Philip Ruddock** (Lib)	Malcolm McKinnon (WP); Astrid O'Neill (AP)
Paterson	NCP	Noel Unicomb	**Frank O'Keefe** (NCP)	Marc Aussie-Stone (Ind); Barnard Hassett (Ind)
Phillip	Labor	**Joe Riordan**	Jack Birney (Lib)	Michael Clarke (WP); Marie Morris (AP)
Prospect	Labor	**Dick Klugman**	Donald MacDonald (Lib)	Geoffrey Thomas (AP)
Reid	Labor	**Tom Uren**	Terence Shanahan (Lib)	Kevin McKenna (WP)
Richmond	NCP	Archibald Johnston	**Doug Anthony** (NCP)	Ethel Adams (Ind); Bernard Walrut (AP)
Riverina	NCP	John Pollard	**John Sullivan** (NCP)	
Robertson	Labor	**Barry Cohen**	Hugh Chalmers (Lib)	Raymond Louis (WP); Phillip Smith (Ind)
St George	Labor	**Bill Morrison**	Maurice Neil (Lib)	Keith Gleeson (WP)
Shortland	Labor	**Peter Morris**	Richard Bevan (Lib)	Lionel Lambkin (Ind); Barbara Timmins (Ind)
Sydney	Labor	Les McMahon	Janis Wallace (Lib)	Laurie Aarons (CPA); Merilyn Giesekam (WP); Roderick MacNeil (Ind)
Warringah	Liberal	Allan Hughes	**Michael MacKellar** (Lib)	Eric Riches (Ind)
Wentworth	Liberal	Mairi Petersen	**Bob Ellicott** (Lib)	John Curvers (WP); Joseph Zingarelli (AP)
Werriwa	Labor	**Gough Whitlam**	William Sadler (Lib)	Marc Aussie-Stone (Ind); Frederick Keep (Ind); Ross May (Ind); Maurice Sharp (Ind); Ronald Watson (WP)

=== Northern Territory ===
Electorate	Held by	Labor candidate	CLP candidate	Australia candidate
Northern Territory	NCP	Jock Nelson	**Sam Calder**	James Forbes

=== Queensland ===
Electorate	Held by	Labor candidate	Coalition candidate	Other candidates
Bowman	Labor	**Len Keogh**	James Dean (NCP); David Jull* (Lib)	Donald Wright (WP)
Brisbane	Labor	**Manfred Cross**	Peter Johnson* (Lib); Harold Porter (NCP)	Rodney Jeanneret (WP)
Capricornia	Labor	**Doug Everingham**	Colin Carige* (NCP); Alfred Millroy (Lib)	
Darling Downs	NCP	Peter Wood	**Tom McVeigh** (NCP)	
Dawson	Labor	**Rex Patterson**	Ray Braithwaite* (NCP); Noel McFarlane (NCP)	Colin Bailey (Ind)
Fisher	NCP	Ivan Guy	**Evan Adermann** (NCP)	Dennis Marshall (WP)
Griffith	Liberal	Ben Humphreys	**Don Cameron** (Lib)	Wallace Younger (WP)
Herbert	Liberal	John Rockett	**Robert Bonnett** (Lib)	
Kennedy	NCP	Robert Gleeson	**Bob Katter** (NCP)	Charles Rendall (WP)
Leichhardt	Labor	Bill Wood	Laurence Hoins (Lib); David Thomson* (NCP)	Clarence Grogan (Ind); Bernard Marsh (DLP)
Lilley	Liberal	Frank Doyle	Peter Addison (NCP); **Kevin Cairns*** (Lib)	
McPherson	Liberal	Brian Paterson	**Eric Robinson** (Lib)	Coral Finlay (WP)
Maranoa	NCP	Reuben Coupe	**James Corbett** (NCP)	Lindsay Sturgess (WP)
Moreton	Liberal	Lewin Blazevich	**James Killen** (Lib)	William Appleton (Ind); John Fitzgerald (Ind)
Oxley	Labor	**Bill Hayden**	Cornelis Frederiks (Lib); James Shapcott (NCP)	Neil Russell (WP)
Petrie	Liberal	John Hungerford	**John Hodges** (Lib)	
Ryan	Liberal	Colin Taylor	Douglas MacTaggart (NCP); John Moore* (Lib)	David Boughen (WP)
Wide Bay	NCP	Brendan Hansen	**Clarrie Millar** (NCP)	Gerrit Alberts (WP)

=== South Australia ===
Electorate	Held by	Labor candidate	Liberal candidate	LM candidate	Other candidates
Adelaide	Labor	**Chris Hurford**	Harold Steele	Robert Hercus	David Middleton (AP)
Angas	Liberal	Adolf Thiel	**Geoffrey Giles**	Giordano Graziani	Richard Philippe (WP)
Barker	Liberal	Graham Bath	James Porter	Rodney Roberts	Lily Bayly (Ind); Kenneth Williams (NCP)
Bonython	Labor	**Martin Nicholls**	Alan Irving	John Longhurst	Robert Durbridge (CPA)
Boothby	Liberal	Mark Pickhaver	**John McLeay**	Peter Berman	Alexander Hunter (Ind)
Grey	Labor	**Laurie Wallis**	Dennis Burman	Arnold Eckersley	
Hawker	Labor	**Ralph Jacobi**	Craig Speil	Stewart Leggett	
Hindmarsh	Labor	**Clyde Cameron**	Valentine Dignum	Ian McGowan	Ross Stanford (Ind)
Kingston	Labor	**Richard Gun**	Grant Chapman	Rodney Adam	Verna Oakley (WP)
Port Adelaide	Labor	**Mick Young**	Terence Hanson	Jean Lawrie	
Sturt	Liberal	Graham Maguire	**Ian Wilson**	Barry Lake	William Forster (WP)
Wakefield	Liberal	Irene Krastev	**Bert Kelly**	John Lienert	

=== Tasmania ===
Electorate	Held by	Labor candidate	Liberal candidate	NCP candidate	Workers candidate
Bass	Liberal	Michael McLaughlin	**Kevin Newman**		Kevin Chaffey
Braddon	Labor	**Ron Davies**	Ray Groom	Barry Whiley	Lance Buckingham
Denison	Labor	**John Coates**	Michael Hodgman	John Hay	Cathryn Stanton
Franklin	Labor	**Ray Sherry**	Bruce Goodluck	Margaret Franklin; Joseph Hand	Peter Mollon
Wilmot	Labor	**Gil Duthie**	Max Burr	Robert Griffin	William Woods

=== Victoria ===
Electorate	Held by	Labor candidate	Coalition candidate	DLP candidate	Australia candidate	Other candidates
Balaclava	Liberal	Martin Ryan	**Ian Macphee** (Lib)	Peter Lawlor	John Howe	
Ballaarat	Liberal	David Williams	Jim Short (Lib)	Bryan Hanrahan		Glendon Ludbrook (Ind)
Batman	Labor	**Horrie Garrick**	Michael Galli (Lib)	Eileen Doyle		
Bendigo	Liberal	Stewart Anderson	**John Bourchier*** (Lib); Henry O'Halloran (NCP)	Paul Brennan		Leslie Irlam (Ind)
Bruce	Liberal	Graeme Bond	**Billy Snedden** (Lib)	John Lloyd	Iris Pederick	Diana Martin (Ind)
Burke	Labor	**Keith Johnson**	Claus Salger (Lib)	Colin Walsh		Michael Dupla (Ind)
Casey	Labor	**Race Mathews**	Peter Falconer (Lib)	John McKenna	Murray Deerbon	Marc Aussie-Stone (Ind)
Chisholm	Liberal	Richard Campbell	**Tony Staley** (Lib)	Joe Stanley	Richard Franklin	
Corangamite	Liberal	Shirley Ambrose	**Tony Street** (Lib)	Francis O'Brien	Ian Slater	Brian Costin (Ind)
Corio	Labor	**Gordon Scholes**	Gordon Hall (Lib)	John Timberlake	Guenter Sahr	
Deakin	Liberal	Gavan Oakley	**Alan Jarman** (Lib)	Jim Brosnan	William Inglis	Walter Williams (Ind)
Diamond Valley	Labor	**David McKenzie**	Neil Brown (Lib)	Christopher Curtis	John Franceschini	Marc Aussie-Stone (Ind); John Duncan (Ind)
Flinders	Liberal	Geoffrey Eastwood	**Phillip Lynch** (Lib)	John Glynn	Peter Dalton	Stanley Hillman (Ind)
Gellibrand	Labor	**Ralph Willis**	Iris Williams (Lib)	Bert Bailey		
Gippsland	NCP	Peter Turner	**Peter Nixon** (NCP)	Robert McMahon		
Henty	Labor	**Joan Child**	Ken Aldred (Lib)	Terence Farrell	Michael Hughes	Marc Aussie-Stone (Ind)
Higgins	Liberal	Andrew Homer	Roger Shipton (Lib)	John Cotter	Rafe Slaney	
Holt	Labor	**Max Oldmeadow**	William Yates (Lib)	Robert Fidler		
Hotham	Liberal	Tony Ross	**Don Chipp** (Lib)	Frank Gaffy		John Murray (Ind)
Indi	NCP	Alan Bell	**Mac Holten** (NCP)	Christopher Cody		
Isaacs	Labor	**Gareth Clayton**	David Hamer (Lib)	Ralph Cleary	Eldon Simmons	Marc Aussie-Stone (Ind)
Kooyong	Liberal	John Wilkinson	**Andrew Peacock** (Lib)	Francis Duffy	John Gare	
La Trobe	Labor	**Tony Lamb**	Marshall Baillieu (Lib)	James Penna	Don Walters	Cornelus Helleman (Ind); Ronald Neilsen (Ind)
Lalor	Labor	**Jim Cairns**	Francis Purcell (Lib)	Denis Bilston		
Mallee	NCP	Ronald Davies	**Peter Fisher** (NCP)	Stanley Croughan		
Maribyrnong	Labor	**Moss Cass**	John Gray (Lib)	Lucia Hayward	Thomas Archay	
McMillan	NCP	William Rutherford	**Arthur Hewson** (NCP); Barry Simon* (Lib)	Les Hilton		David Little (Ind)
Melbourne	Labor	**Ted Innes**	Robert Fallshaw (Lib)	Desmond Burke	Veronica Schwarz	Ian Fehring (CPA)
Melbourne Ports	Labor	**Frank Crean**	Frederick Gray (NCP); Roger Johnston (Lib)	Gordon Haberman	Beverley Broadbent	Henry Sanders (Ind)
Murray	NCP	Marjorie Gillies	**Bruce Lloyd** (NCP)	Patrick Payne		
Scullin	Labor	**Harry Jenkins**	Gerard Clarke (Lib)	Bernard McGrath		Bernard Irving (Ind)
Wannon	Liberal	Keith Wilson	**Malcolm Fraser** (Lib)	John Casanova		
Wills	Labor	**Gordon Bryant**	Howard Kiel (Lib)	John Flint		
Wimmera	NCP	Brian Brooke	**Robert King** (NCP)	Marjorie McOwan		Francis Petering (Ind)

=== Western Australia ===
Electorate	Held by	Labor candidate	Liberal candidate	NCP candidate	Other candidates
Canning	Liberal	Marilyn Anthony	**Mel Bungey**	John Hallett	
Curtin	Liberal	John Crouch	**Victor Garland**		
Forrest	Liberal	Geoffrey Davy	**Peter Drummond**	Noel Klopper	Noel Duggan (Ind); Duncan Hordacre (Ind)
Fremantle	Labor	**Kim Beazley**	Leon Lapinski		
Kalgoorlie	Labor	**Fred Collard**	Mick Cotter		Graham Mills (WP)
Moore	Liberal	Allen Blanchard	**John Hyde**	Graham Anderson	
Perth	Labor	**Joe Berinson**	Ross McLean		Vic Slater (CPA)
Stirling	Liberal	Graham Reece	**Ian Viner**		Brian Butterworth (WP)
Swan	Labor	**Adrian Bennett**	John Martyr	Peter Masson	
Tangney	Labor	**John Dawkins**	Peter Richardson		Warwick Agnew (WP)

== Senate ==
Sitting Senators are shown in bold text. Since this was a double dissolution election, all senators were up for re-election. The first five successful candidates from each state were elected to six-year terms, the remaining five to three-year terms. Tickets that elected at least one Senator are highlighted in the relevant colour. Successful candidates are identified by an asterisk (*).

=== Australian Capital Territory ===
Two seats were up for election, the first time the ACT had voted for the Senate.

Labor candidates	Liberal candidates	Gorton candidates	Workers candidates	Ungrouped candidates
1. Susan Ryan*; 2. Peter Ellyard	1. John Knight*; 2. Trevor Crouch	1. John Gorton; 2. Harold Hird	1. Leslie Shaw; 2. Gerald O'Shaughnessy	Ian Black; Tony Spagnolo; Roderick Quinn; Michael Cavanough

=== New South Wales ===
Ten seats were up for election. The Labor Party was defending five seats (although Lionel Murphy's vacancy had been filled by independent Cleaver Bunton, who did not contest in 1975). The Liberal-NCP Coalition was defending five seats.

Labor candidates	Coalition candidates	DLP candidates	Australia candidates	LM candidates	Workers candidates
1. **Doug McClelland***; 2. **Jim McClelland***; 3. **Tony Mulvihill***; 4. **Arthur Gietzelt***; 5. Kerry Sibraa*; 6. Emily Renshaw	1. **Bob Cotton*** (Lib); 2. **John Carrick*** (Lib); 3. **Douglas Scott*** (NCP); 4. **Peter Baume*** (Lib); 5. Misha Lajovic* (Lib); 6. Dorothy Ross (NCP)	1. Jack Kane; 2. Peter Daly; 3. Anne McCosker; 4. Bill Casey; 5. James Keogh; 6. Peter Westmore	1. Colin Mason; 2. Robert Newman; 3. Mavis McMillan	1. Terence Morgan; 2. Bill Payne	1. John Hill; 2. Mark Tier; 3. Susan O'Sullivan; 4. Neville Kennard; 5. John Grant; 6. John Edmonds
AFAM candidates	Group A candidates	Group D candidates	Group F candidates	Ungrouped candidates	
1. Frieda Brown; 2. Fred Nile; 3. Ken Harrison	1. Helen Jarvis; 2. Gordon Adler	1. Ron Kelly; 2. Robert Khoury	1. Ross Green; 2. Lyn Wilson	Athol Martin; Adrian Alle; Noel Howard; Darius Pourshasb; Lawrence Woods; Kenneth Burke; Luciano Becher; David McPherson	Bruce Taber; Thomas Guy; Reginald Appleby; Andrew Boyton; Michael Steuart; Michael Wojeszlovszky; John Breen-Hemingway

=== Northern Territory ===
Two seats were up for election, the first time the Northern Territory had voted for the Senate.

Labor candidates	CLP candidates	Australia candidates	Ungrouped candidates
1. Ted Robertson*; 2. Kevin Frazer	1. Bernie Kilgariff*; 2. Martyn Finger	1. Edward Giblin; 2. Joan Breen	David Fisher (WP); Alexander Allan-Stewart; Kenneth Day (WP); Charles Perkins

=== Queensland ===
Ten seats were up for election. The Labor Party was defending three seats. The Liberal-NCP Coalition was defending six seats. Independent Senator Albert Field, who had been appointed to Labor Senator Bertie Milliner's seat after the latter's death, was defending one seat.

Labor candidates	Coalition candidates	DLP candidates	Australia candidates	LM candidates	Workers candidates
1. **Jim Keeffe***; 2. **Ron McAuliffe***; 3. **George Georges***; 4. Mal Colston*; 5. Colleen Freeman; 6. Ken Vaughan	1. **Neville Bonner*** (Lib); 2. **Ron Maunsell*** (NCP); 3. **Glen Sheil*** (NCP); 4. **Kathy Martin*** (Lib); 5. **Ian Wood*** (Lib); 6. Stan Collard* (NCP); 7. Richard Austin (Lib)	1. Condon Byrne; 2. Jack Williams; 3. John Fox; 4. Therese Sheil; 5. Edgar Lanigan; 6. Andrew Jackson	1. John Lamb; 2. Arthur Smith	1. Desmond Breen; 2. Michael Hartwig; 3. Alan Williams	1. David Russell; 2. Roger Wickham; 3. Susan Benfer
Group G candidates	Ungrouped candidates				
1. James Drabsch; 2. Philip de Felice	Leonard Grasishchuk; Grace Plunkett; Renfrey Clarke; **Albert Field**; John McRae; Douglas Gillespie	Anthony Catip; Malcolm Just; Anne Glew; George Allard; Hubert Giesberts			

=== South Australia ===
Ten seats were up for election. The Labor Party was defending five seats. The Liberal Party was defending four seats. The Liberal Movement was defending one seat.

Labor candidates	Liberal candidates	LM candidates	DLP candidates	Socialist candidates	Workers candidates
1. **Reg Bishop***; 2. **Jim Cavanagh***; 3. **Don Cameron***; 4. **Geoff McLaren***; 5. Neal Blewett; 6. **Arnold Drury**	1. **Gordon Davidson***; 2. **Don Jessop***; 3. **Condor Laucke***; 4. **Harold Young***; 5. Tony Messner*; 6. Jennifer Adamson	1. **Steele Hall***; 2. Michael Wilson; 3. Janine Haines; 4. Ronald Moulds; 5. Stewart McLeod; 6. Heather Southcott	1. Ted Farrell; 2. Leonie Farrell	1. Bobbie Pointer; 2. Muriel Goss; 3. Alan Miller	1. John Whiting; 2. Andrew Buttfield; 3. Antony Hayden-Smith; 4. Beverly Borg; 5. Leslie Huxley; 6. Nelson Cartney
Group B candidates	Group D candidates	Group E candidates	Ungrouped candidates		
1. Frank Darlington; 2. John Knight	1. Brett Trenery; 2. Peter Abrahamson	1. John Henderson; 2. Charles Groves	John Steele; James Pedley		

=== Tasmania ===
Ten seats were up for election. The Labor Party was defending five seats. The Liberal Party was defending four seats, but independent Senator Michael Townley had also joined the party.

Labor candidates	Liberal candidates	NCP candidates	Workers candidates	Harradine candidates	UTG candidates	Ungrouped candidates
1. **Ken Wriedt***; 2. **Justin O'Byrne***; 3. **Don Devitt***; 4. **Don Grimes***; 5. **Merv Everett**; 6. Graham Malley	1. **Peter Rae***; 2. **Michael Townley***; 3. Brian Archer*; 4. **Reg Wright***; 5. Shirley Walters*; 6. **Eric Bessell**	1. Bill Casimaty; 2. Donald Hazell; 3. Margaret Rockliff	1. Mike Stanton; 2. Denis Mackey; 3. Frederick Auld; 4. Warren Scott; 5. Peter Chaplin	1. Brian Harradine*; 2. John Jones	1. Richard Jones; 2. Bob Brown	John Tully; Eric Wilson; Enid Shea; Albert Mansell

=== Victoria ===
Ten seats were up for election. The Labor Party was defending five seats. The Liberal-NCP Coalition was defending five seats.

Labor candidates	Coalition candidates	DLP candidates	LM candidates	Australia candidates	Group B candidates
1. **Jean Melzer***; 2. **Cyril Primmer***; 3. **John Button***; 4. **Bill Brown***; 5. Bill Hartley; 6. Gareth Evans	1. **Ivor Greenwood*** (Lib); 2. **Margaret Guilfoyle*** (Lib); 3. **James Webster*** (NCP); 4. **Sir Magnus Cormack*** (Lib); 5. **Alan Missen*** (Lib); 6. Tom Tehan* (NCP)	1. Frank McManus; 2. Jack Little; 3. Paul McManus; 4. Marianne Crowe; 5. Michael Houlihan	1. Andrew Farran; 2. Robert Laing; 3. Ian Robertson; 4. Philip Martyn	1. John Siddons; 2. Trevor Cooke; 3. Harold Jeffrey	1. John Roseman; 2. Alan Anderson
Group C candidates	Group H candidates	Ungrouped candidates			
1. Peter Conrick; 2. Diane Ewin	1. Bruce McGuinness; 2. Elizabeth Hoffman; 3. Alma Thorpe	Shane Watson; Maurice Smith; Chris Tsolos; Ian Dunne	Neil Leicht; George Alexander; Donald Maggs		

=== Western Australia ===
Ten seats were up for election. The Labor Party was defending five seats. The Liberal Party was defending four seats. The National Country Party was defending one seat.

Labor candidates	Liberal candidates	NCP candidates	DLP candidates	LM candidates	Australia candidates
1. **John Wheeldon***; 2. **Gordon McIntosh***; 3. **Peter Walsh***; 4. **Ruth Coleman***; 5. Bob Hetherington; 6. Duncan Graham	1. **Reg Withers***; 2. **Peter Durack***; 3. **Peter Sim***; 4. **Fred Chaney***; 5. Andrew Thomas*; 6. Cynthia Smart	1. **Tom Drake-Brockman***; 2. David Reid; 3. Winifred Piesse; 4. Lloyd Nelson; 5. Kevin Critch; 6. Jennifer Lewis	1. William Sullivan; 2. Rosemary Taboni; 3. Peter Moorehouse; 4. Alan Crofts; 5. John Poole; 6. Paul Daly	1. Jack Evans; 2. Diana Downs; 3. Bruce Thomson	1. Robert Russell-Brown; 2. John Stuart; 3. John Kernot
Workers candidates	Group B candidates	Group F candidates	Group H candidates	Group K candidates	Group L candidates
1. James MacDonald; 2. Geoffrey McNeil; 3. Valda Harris; 4. Kenneth Bellemore; 5. Roy Morien	1. Donald Galloway; 2. Albert Prince	1. James Mazza; 2. Sydney Greenacre; 3. George Gaunt	1. Syd Negus; 2. Lorraine Negus	1. Francesco Nesci; 2. Nellie Stuart	1. Robert Townsend; 2. Eric Woodard; 3. Kenneth Baines
Ungrouped candidates					
George Abdullah; Keith Lockhart; Frederick Bourke; Arthur Wight; John Furey; Mervyn Lambert					

== Summary by party ==
Beside each party is the number of seats contested by that party in the House of Representatives for each state, as well as an indication of whether the party contested the Senate election in the respective state.

Party	NSW		Vic		Qld		WA		SA		Tas		ACT		NT		Total	
Party	HR	S	HR	S	HR	S	HR	S	HR	S	HR	S	HR	S	HR	S	HR	S
Australian Labor Party	45	*	34	*	18	*	10	*	12	*	5	*	2	*	1	*	127	8
Liberal Party of Australia	36	*	29	*	12	*	10	*	12	*	5	*	2	*			106	7
National Country Party	12	*	8	*	14	*	4	*	1		5	*					44	5
Country Liberal Party															1	*	1	1
Workers Party	22	*			9	*	3	*	2	*	5	*	1	*		*	42	7
Democratic Labor Party	1	*	34	*	1	*		*		*							36	5
Australia Party	13	*	17	*		*		*	1						1	*	32	5
Liberal Movement		*		*		*		*	12	*			2				14	5
Communist Party of Australia	2		1				1		1								5	
Australian Family Action Movement		*																1
Socialist Party of Australia										*								1
United Tasmania Group												*						1
Independent and other	43		19		5		2		5				2				74	

== See also ==
- 1975 Australian federal election
- Members of the Australian House of Representatives, 1974–1975
- Members of the Australian House of Representatives, 1975–1977
- Members of the Australian Senate, 1974–1975
- Members of the Australian Senate, 1975–1978
- List of political parties in Australia
