= Members of the Australian House of Representatives, 1974–1975 =

This is a list of members of the Australian House of Representatives of the 29th Parliament of Australia (1974–1975) as elected on 18 May 1974. It convened on 12 June 1974, and ended on 11 November 1975. On 18 May 1974 a double dissolution of both Houses was held. All 127 seats in the House of Representatives, and all 60 seats in the Senate were up for election. The incumbent Australian Labor Party led by Prime Minister of Australia Gough Whitlam defeated the opposition Liberal Party of Australia led by Billy Snedden and Coalition partner the Country Party led by Doug Anthony.

== Members ==
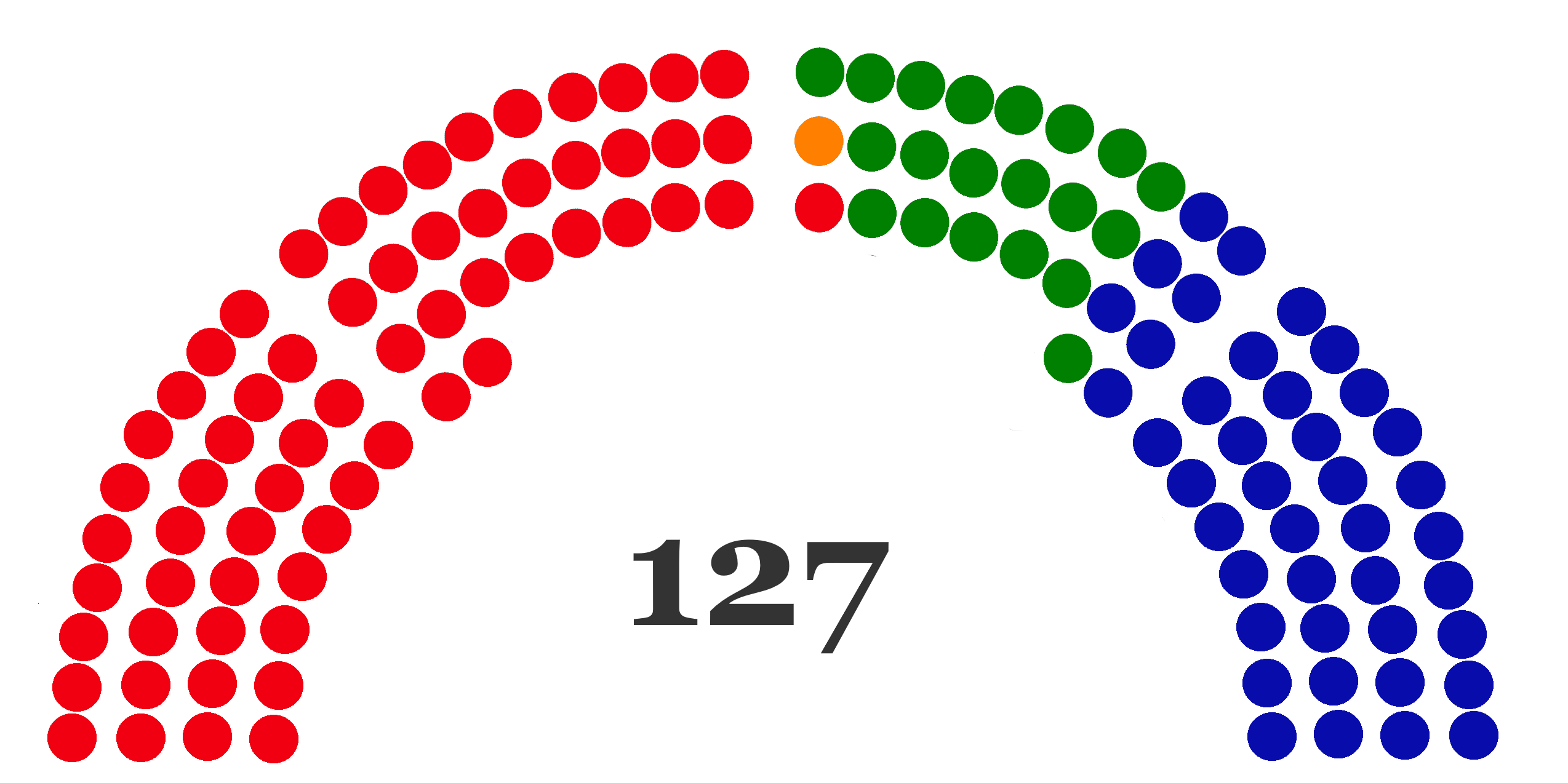
All 127 seats of the 1974–1975 House shown grouped by party

Member	Party	Electorate	State	Years in office
Evan Adermann	Country	Fisher	Qld	1972–1990
Doug Anthony	Country	Richmond	NSW	1957–1984
John Armitage	Labor	Chifley	NSW	1961–1963, 1969–1983
Lance Barnard ^{1}	Labor	Bass	Tas	1954–1975
Kim Beazley Sr.	Labor	Fremantle	WA	1945–1977
Adrian Bennett	Labor	Swan	WA	1969–1975
Joe Berinson	Labor	Perth	WA	1969–1975
Robert Bonnett	Liberal	Herbert	Qld	1966–1977
John Bourchier	Liberal	Bendigo	Vic	1972–1983
Lionel Bowen	Labor	Kingsford-Smith	NSW	1969–1990
Gordon Bryant	Labor	Wills	Vic	1955–1980
Mel Bungey	Liberal	Canning	WA	1974–1983
Alan Cadman	Liberal	Mitchell	NSW	1974–2007
Jim Cairns	Labor	Lalor	Vic	1955–1977
Kevin Cairns	Liberal	Lilley	Qld	1963–1972, 1974–1980
Sam Calder	Country Liberal	Northern Territory	NT	1966–1980
Clyde Cameron	Labor	Hindmarsh	SA	1949–1980
Don Cameron	Liberal	Griffith	Qld	1966–1990
Moss Cass	Labor	Maribyrnong	Vic	1969–1983
Joan Child	Labor	Henty	Vic	1974–1975, 1980–1990
Don Chipp	Liberal	Hotham	Vic	1960–1977
Gareth Clayton	Labor	Isaacs	Vic	1974–1975
John Coates	Labor	Denison	Tas	1972–1975
Barry Cohen	Labor	Robertson	NSW	1969–1990
Fred Collard	Labor	Kalgoorlie	WA	1961–1975
David Connolly	Liberal	Bradfield	NSW	1974–1996
Rex Connor	Labor	Cunningham	NSW	1963–1977
James Corbett	Country	Maranoa	Qld	1966–1980
Jim Cope	Labor	Sydney	NSW	1955–1975
Frank Crean	Labor	Melbourne Ports	Vic	1951–1977
Manfred Cross	Labor	Brisbane	Qld	1961–1975, 1980–1990
Fred Daly	Labor	Grayndler	NSW	1943–1975
Ron Davies	Labor	Braddon	Tas	1958–1975
John Dawkins	Labor	Tangney	WA	1974–1975, 1977–1994
Peter Drummond	Liberal	Forrest	WA	1972–1987
Nigel Drury	Liberal	Ryan	Qld	1949–1975
Gil Duthie	Labor	Wilmot	Tas	1946–1975
Harry Edwards	Liberal	Berowra	NSW	1972–1993
Bob Ellicott	Liberal	Wentworth	NSW	1974–1981
Kep Enderby	Labor	Canberra	ACT	1970–1975
John England	Country	Calare	NSW	1960–1975
Dudley Erwin	Liberal	Ballaarat	Vic	1955–1975
Doug Everingham	Labor	Capricornia	Qld	1967–1975, 1977–1984
David Fairbairn	Liberal	Farrer	NSW	1949–1975
Peter Fisher	Country	Mallee	Vic	1972–1993
John FitzPatrick	Labor	Darling	NSW	1969–1980
Jim Forbes	Liberal	Barker	SA	1956–1975
Malcolm Fraser	Liberal	Wannon	Vic	1955–1984
Ken Fry	Labor	Fraser	ACT	1974–1984
Bill Fulton	Labor	Leichhardt	Qld	1958–1975
Victor Garland	Liberal	Curtin	WA	1969–1981
Horrie Garrick	Labor	Batman	Vic	1969–1977
Geoffrey Giles	Liberal	Angas	SA	1964–1983
John Gorton	Liberal	Higgins	Vic	1968–1975
Bill Graham	Liberal	North Sydney	NSW	1949–1954, 1955–1958, 1966–1980
Richard Gun	Labor	Kingston	SA	1969–1975
Bill Hayden	Labor	Oxley	Qld	1961–1988
Arthur Hewson	Country	McMillan	Vic	1972–1975
John Hodges	Liberal	Petrie	Qld	1974–1983, 1984–1987
Mac Holten	Country	Indi	Vic	1958–1977
John Howard	Liberal	Bennelong	NSW	1974–2007
Ralph Hunt	Country	Gwydir	NSW	1969–1989
Chris Hurford	Labor	Adelaide	SA	1969–1988
John Hyde	Liberal	Moore	WA	1974–1983
Ted Innes	Labor	Melbourne	Vic	1972–1983
Ralph Jacobi	Labor	Hawker	SA	1969–1987
Bert James	Labor	Hunter	NSW	1960–1980
Alan Jarman	Liberal	Deakin	Vic	1966–1983
Harry Jenkins Sr.	Labor	Scullin	Vic	1969–1985
Keith Johnson	Labor	Burke	Vic	1969–1980
Les Johnson	Labor	Hughes	NSW	1955–1966, 1969–1984
Charles Jones	Labor	Newcastle	NSW	1958–1983
Bob Katter Sr.	Country	Kennedy	Qld	1966–1990
Paul Keating	Labor	Blaxland	NSW	1969–1996
Bert Kelly	Liberal	Wakefield	SA	1958–1977
Len Keogh	Labor	Bowman	Qld	1969–1975, 1983–1987
John Kerin	Labor	Macarthur	NSW	1972–1975, 1978–1993
James Killen	Liberal	Moreton	Qld	1955–1983
Robert King	Country	Wimmera	Vic	1958–1977
Dick Klugman	Labor	Prospect	NSW	1969–1990
Tony Lamb	Labor	La Trobe	Vic	1972–1975, 1984–1990
Bruce Lloyd	Country	Murray	Vic	1971–1996
Tony Luchetti	Labor	Macquarie	NSW	1951–1975
Philip Lucock	Country	Lyne	NSW	1952–1980
Stephen Lusher	Country	Hume	NSW	1974–1984
Phillip Lynch	Liberal	Flinders	Vic	1966–1982
Michael MacKellar	Liberal	Warringah	NSW	1969–1994
Ian Macphee	Liberal	Balaclava	Vic	1974–1990
Vince Martin	Labor	Banks	NSW	1969–1980
Race Mathews	Labor	Casey	Vic	1972–1975
David McKenzie	Labor	Diamond Valley	Vic	1972–1975
John McLeay Jr.	Liberal	Boothby	SA	1966–1981
William McMahon	Liberal	Lowe	NSW	1949–1982
Tom McVeigh	Country	Darling Downs	Qld	1972–1988
Clarrie Millar	Country	Wide Bay	Qld	1974–1990
Peter Morris	Labor	Shortland	NSW	1972–1998
Bill Morrison	Labor	St George	NSW	1969–1975, 1980–1984
Allan Mulder	Labor	Evans	NSW	1972–1975
Kevin Newman ^{1}	Liberal	Bass	Tas	1975–1984
Martin Nicholls	Labor	Bonython	SA	1963–1977
Peter Nixon	Country	Gippsland	Vic	1961–1983
Frank O'Keefe	Country	Paterson	NSW	1969–1984
Max Oldmeadow	Labor	Holt	Vic	1972–1975
Rex Patterson	Labor	Dawson	Qld	1966–1975
Andrew Peacock	Liberal	Kooyong	Vic	1966–1994
Len Reynolds	Labor	Barton	NSW	1958–1966, 1969–1975
Joe Riordan	Labor	Phillip	NSW	1972–1975
Eric Robinson	Liberal	McPherson	Qld	1972–1990
Ian Robinson	Country	Cowper	NSW	1963–1981
Philip Ruddock	Liberal	Parramatta	NSW	1973–2016
Gordon Scholes	Labor	Corio	Vic	1967–1993
Ray Sherry	Labor	Franklin	Tas	1969–1975
Ian Sinclair	Country	New England	NSW	1963–1998
Billy Snedden	Liberal	Bruce	Vic	1955–1983
Tony Staley	Liberal	Chisholm	Vic	1970–1980
Frank Stewart	Labor	Lang	NSW	1953–1979
Tony Street	Liberal	Corangamite	Vic	1966–1984
John Sullivan	Country	Riverina	NSW	1974–1977
Ray Thorburn	Labor	Cook	NSW	1972–1975
Tom Uren	Labor	Reid	NSW	1958–1990
Ian Viner	Liberal	Stirling	WA	1972–1983
Laurie Wallis	Labor	Grey	SA	1969–1983
Bill Wentworth	Liberal	Mackellar	NSW	1949–1977
Bob Whan	Labor	Eden-Monaro	NSW	1972–1975
Gough Whitlam	Labor	Werriwa	NSW	1952–1978
Ralph Willis	Labor	Gellibrand	Vic	1972–1998
Ian Wilson	Liberal	Sturt	SA	1966–1969, 1972–1993
Mick Young	Labor	Port Adelaide	SA	1974–1988

^{1} Labor member Lance Barnard resigned on 2 June 1975; Liberal candidate Kevin Newman won the resulting by-election on 28 June 1975.

== Leadership ==
=== Presiding officer ===
Office	Party	Officer	Electorate	State	Term
Speaker of the House	Labor	Jim Cope	Sydney	NSW	27 February 1973 – 27 February 1975
Speaker of the House	Labor	Gordon Scholes	Corio	Vic	27 February 1975 – 11 November 1975

=== Majority leadership (Labor) ===
Office	Officer	Electorate	State	Term of office
Leader of the House	Fred Daly	Grayndler	NSW	5 December 1972 – 22 December 1975
House Majority Whip	Martin Nicholls	Bonython	SA	10 June 1974 – 9 March 1977
Deputy Speaker	Gordon Scholes	Corio	Vic	28 February 1973 – 27 February 1975
Deputy Speaker	Joe Berinson	Perth	WA	27 February 1975 – 14 July 1975
Deputy Speaker	Harry Jenkins Sr.	Scullin	Vic	19 August 1975 – 11 November 1975
Chair, Labor Party Caucus	Bill Brown		Vic	
Deputy Chair, Labor Party Caucus	Ted Innes	Melbourne	Vic	

=== Minority leadership (Liberal–Country) ===
Office	Officer	Party	Electorate	State	Term of office
Opposition Leader of the House	Ian Sinclair	Country	New England	NSW	22 December 1975 – 27 September 1979
Deputy Leader of the Opposition	Phillip Lynch	Liberal	Flinders	Vic	
Chief Opposition Whip in the House	Victor Garland	Liberal	Curtin	WA	

== Partisan mix of the House by state and territory ==
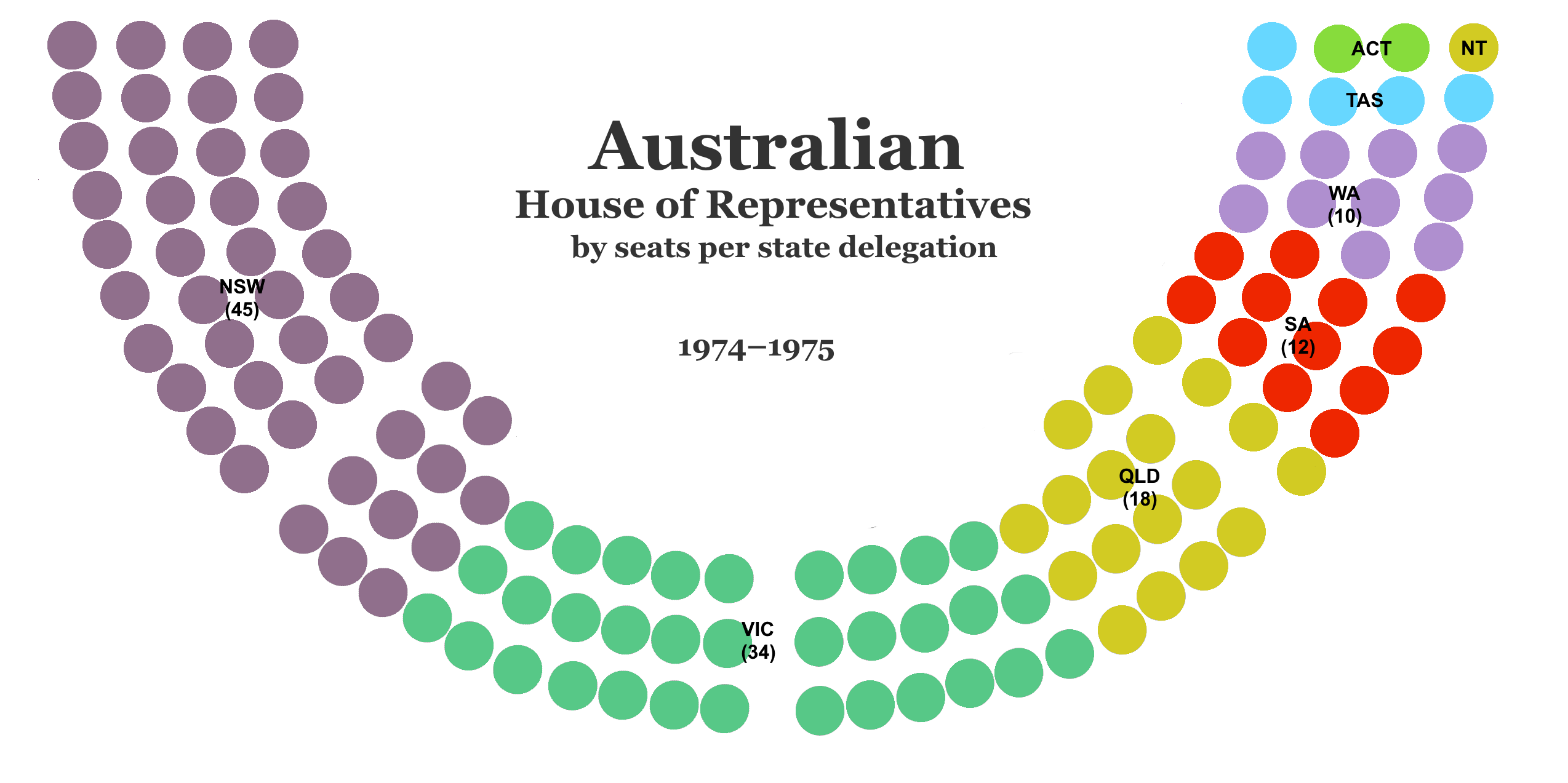
All 127 seats of the 1974–1975 House shown grouped by state, largest to smallest

Partisan mix of the House by state and territory
State/Territory ranked in partisan order	Percentage Liberal-Country	Percentage Labor	Liberal-Country/Labor	Liberal-Country seat plurality
NT	100%	0%	1/0	+1
QLD	67%	33%	12/6	+6
VIC	53%	47%	18/16	+2
WA	50%	50%	5/5	0
NSW	44%	56%	20/25	−5
SA	42%	58%	5/7	−2
TAS	20%	80%	1/4	−3
ACT	0%	100%	0/2	−2
House of Representatives	48.8%	51.2%	62/65	-3
