= Malcolm George Mackay =

Malcolm George Mackay may refer to:

- Malky Mackay (born 1972), Scottish football manager and former footballer
- Malcolm Mackay (Australian politician) (1919–1999), Australian clergyman and politician
