= Leader of the Opposition (Australia) =

Australian parliamentary position

- Commonwealth Coat of Arms

- Flag of Australia

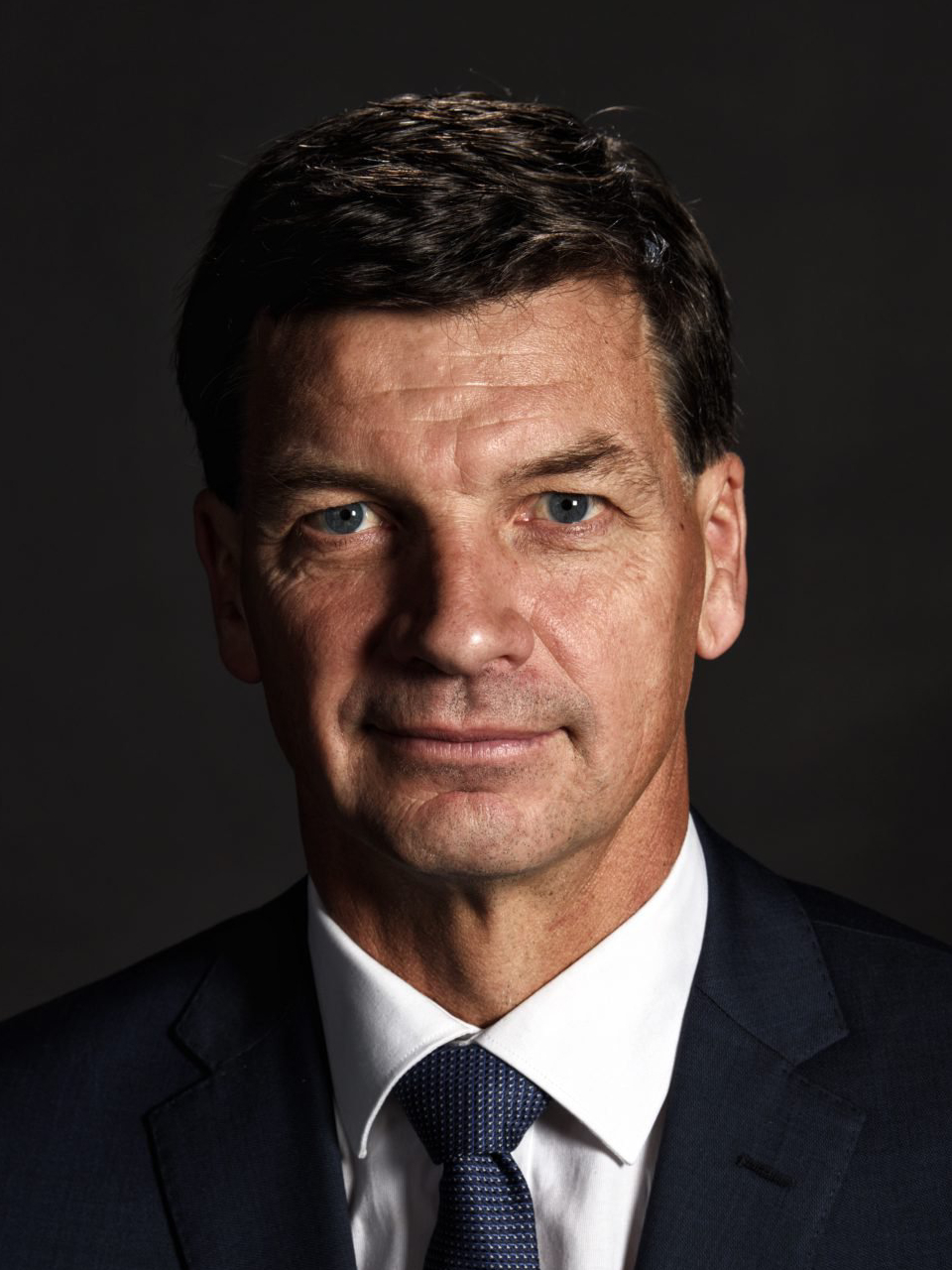
- Incumbent; Angus Taylor since 13 February 2026
- Opposition of Australia; Shadow Cabinet of Australia
- Member of: Shadow Cabinet; Parliament
- Reports to: Parliament
- Inaugural holder: George Reid
- Formation: 1901
- Salary: $390,000

In Australian federal politics, the leader of the Opposition is an elected member of parliament (MP) in the Australian House of Representatives who leads the Opposition. The leader of the Opposition, by convention, is the leader of the largest political party in the House of Representatives that is not in Government.

When in Parliament, the opposition leader sits on the left-hand side of the centre table, in front of the opposition and opposite of the prime minister. The opposition leader is elected by their party according to its rules. A new leader of the opposition may be elected when the incumbent dies, resigns, or is challenged for the leadership.

Australia is a constitutional monarchy with a parliamentary system and is based on the Westminster model. The term "opposition" has a specific meaning in the parliamentary sense. It is an important component of the Westminster system, with the opposition directing criticism at the government and attempts to defeat and replace the Government. The opposition is therefore known as the "government in waiting" and it is a formal part of the parliamentary system. It is in opposition to the government, but not to the Crown; hence the term "His Majesty's Loyal Opposition".

To date there have been 37 opposition leaders, 19 of whom also have served terms as prime minister. Since 13 February 2026, the leader of the Opposition role has been held by Angus Taylor.

== Role ==
The opposition leader is the opposition's counterpart to the prime minister. The opposition leader is expected to be ready to form a new government if the incumbent government is unable to continue in office. This typically occurs when the opposition wins a federal election, after which the opposition leader is appointed prime minister. However, the opposition leader may also be called upon to form government if the incumbent government loses the confidence of the House (most recently in 1941) or if they are otherwise removed by the governor-general (most recently in 1975).

The opposition leader is the head of the shadow ministry, allocating portfolios and, in the case of the Coalition, determining its membership. The opposition leader is assisted by a deputy leader of the opposition, who is also recognised in the standing orders and entitled to an additional salary. Both the opposition leader and deputy opposition leader are entitled to a degree of special preference from the Speaker of the House.

The position of opposition leader has no constitutional basis but exists as a matter of convention in the Westminster system. A 1960 inquiry into parliamentary salaries and allowances observed:

The Leader of the Opposition has to make himself master of all the business which comes before the House (not merely that of one or two departments); he has to do this at times at short notice and under constant pressure; and he gets no help from permanent officials. At all times he is the spokesman for those who are critical of or opposed to the Government, and he must be unceasingly vigilant and active. He and the Prime Minister should be the most powerful agents in guiding and forming public opinion on issues of policy.

Whereas according to the Coalition agreement the Leader of the National Party serves as Deputy Prime Minister when the Coalition is in government, no such agreement exists when the Coalition is in Opposition, and no National Party politician has ever served as Deputy Leader of the Opposition.

== History ==
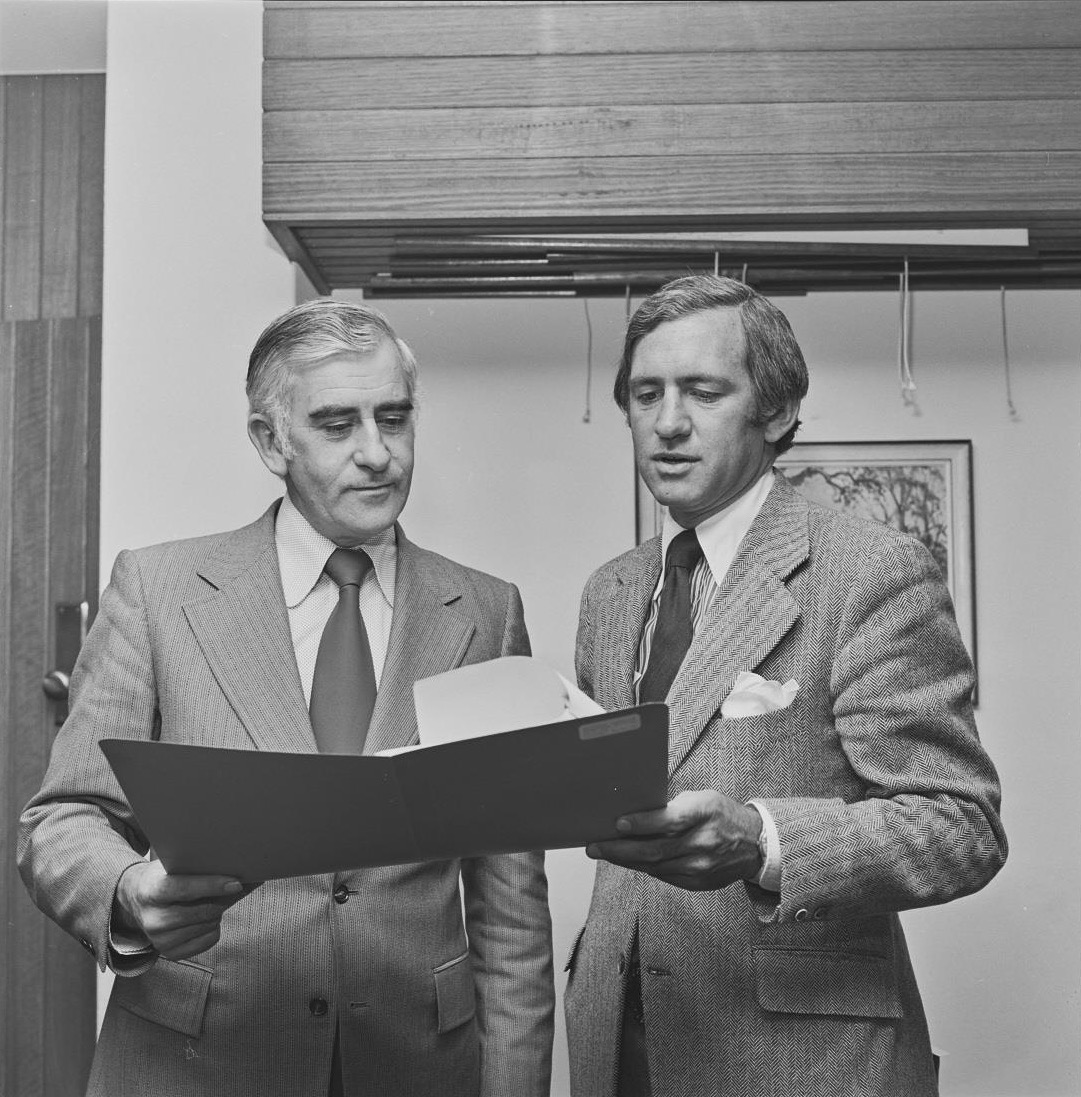
Billy Snedden and Andrew Peacock on 12 October 1973. Both served as Opposition Leader, but never became Prime Minister.

George Reid became the de facto leader of the opposition in the lead-up to the inaugural 1901 federal election, following the appointment of Edmund Barton to lead a caretaker government as Australia's first prime minister. His status was confirmed when the House of Representatives met for the first time after the election. The opposition leader was initially not entitled to any salary or entitlements beyond those of an ordinary member of parliament. As a result, Reid had to maintain his legal practice in Sydney to support himself and was able to attend just over one-third of the sitting days in the first session of parliament.

Although the role was firmly established, the House did not formally recognise the position of opposition leader in its records until 1920. It was recognised by statute for the first time with the passage of the Parliamentary Allowances Act 1920, which granted its holder an additional allowance. Prime Minister Andrew Fisher had previously offered Opposition Leader Alfred Deakin an allowance in 1910. Deakin declined, but did accept a paid secretary. In 1931, the office was incorporated into the House's standing orders for the first time, with the opposition leader granted the right to exceed the time limit for speeches in certain instances.

== Salary ==
The opposition leader's salary is determined by the Remuneration Tribunal, an independent statutory body. As of 1 July 2019, the incumbent is entitled to a parliamentarian's base salary of A$211,250 plus an additional 85% loading, equating to a salary of around $390,000.

== List of leaders of the opposition ==
No.	Leader	Party	Constituency	Took office	Left office	Prime Minister	Ref
1	George Reid (Note: Opposition Leader who later became Prime Minister.)	Free Trade	East Sydney (NSW)	19 May 1901	18 August 1904	Barton 1901–1903	
1	George Reid	Free Trade	East Sydney (NSW)	19 May 1901	18 August 1904	Deakin 1903–1904	
1	George Reid	Free Trade	East Sydney (NSW)	19 May 1901	18 August 1904	Watson 1904	
2	Chris Watson (Note: Opposition Leader who had previously been Prime Minister.)	Labor	Bland (NSW)	18 August 1904	5 July 1905	Reid 1904–1905	
(1)	George Reid	Free Trade / Anti-Socialist	East Sydney (NSW)	5 July 1905	16 November 1908	Deakin 1905–1908	
(1)	George Reid	Free Trade / Anti-Socialist	East Sydney (NSW)	5 July 1905	16 November 1908	Fisher 1908–1909	
3	Joseph Cook	Anti-Socialist	Parramatta (NSW)	16 November 1908	26 May 1909	Fisher 1908–1909	
4	Alfred Deakin	Liberal	Ballaarat (Vic.)	26 May 1909	2 June 1909	Fisher 1908–1909	
5	Andrew Fisher	Labor	Wide Bay (Qld)	2 June 1909	29 April 1910	Deakin 1909	
(4)	Alfred Deakin	Liberal	Ballaarat (Vic.)	29 April 1910	20 January 1913	Fisher 1910–1913	
(3)	Joseph Cook	Liberal	Parramatta (NSW)	20 January 1913	24 June 1913	Fisher 1910–1913	
(5)	Andrew Fisher	Labor	Wide Bay (Qld)	24 June 1913	17 September 1914	Cook 1913–1914	
(3)	Joseph Cook	Liberal	Parramatta (NSW)	8 October 1914	14 November 1916	Fisher 1914–1915	
(3)	Joseph Cook	Liberal	Parramatta (NSW)	8 October 1914	14 November 1916	Hughes 1915–1923	
6	Frank Tudor	Labor	Yarra (Vic.)	16 November 1916	10 January 1922	Hughes 1915–1923	
7	Matthew Charlton	Labor	Hunter (NSW)	10 January 1922	29 March 1928	Hughes 1915–1923	
7	Matthew Charlton	Labor	Hunter (NSW)	10 January 1922	29 March 1928	Bruce 1923–1929	
8	James Scullin	Labor	Yarra (Vic.)	29 March 1928	22 October 1929	Bruce 1923–1929	
9	John Latham	Nationalist	Kooyong (Vic.)	20 November 1929	7 May 1931	Scullin 1929–1932	
10	Joseph Lyons	United Australia	Wilmot (Tas.)	7 May 1931	6 January 1932	Scullin 1929–1932	
(8)	James Scullin	Labor	Yarra (Vic.)	6 January 1932	1 October 1935	Lyons 1932–1939	
11	John Curtin	Labor	Fremantle (WA)	1 October 1935	7 October 1941	Lyons 1932–1939	
11	John Curtin	Labor	Fremantle (WA)	1 October 1935	7 October 1941	Page 1939	
11	John Curtin	Labor	Fremantle (WA)	1 October 1935	7 October 1941	Menzies 1939–1941	
11	John Curtin	Labor	Fremantle (WA)	1 October 1935	7 October 1941	Fadden 1941	
12	Arthur Fadden	Country	Darling Downs (Qld)	7 October 1941	23 September 1943	Curtin 1941–1945	
13	Robert Menzies	United Australia	Kooyong (Vic.)	23 September 1943	19 December 1949	Curtin 1941–1945	
13	Robert Menzies	Liberal	Kooyong (Vic.)	23 September 1943	19 December 1949	Forde 1945	
13	Robert Menzies	Liberal	Kooyong (Vic.)	23 September 1943	19 December 1949	Chifley 1945–1949	
14	Ben Chifley	Labor	Macquarie (NSW)	19 December 1949	13 June 1951	Menzies 1949–1966	
15	H. V. Evatt	Labor	Barton (NSW; 1940–1958); Hunter (NSW; 1958–1960)	20 June 1951	9 February 1960	Menzies 1949–1966	
16	Arthur Calwell	Labor	Melbourne (Vic.)	7 March 1960	8 February 1967	Menzies 1949–1966	
16	Arthur Calwell	Labor	Melbourne (Vic.)	7 March 1960	8 February 1967	Holt 1966–1967	
17	Gough Whitlam	Labor	Werriwa (NSW)	8 February 1967	2 December 1972	Holt 1966–1967	
17	Gough Whitlam	Labor	Werriwa (NSW)	8 February 1967	2 December 1972	McEwen 1967–1968	
17	Gough Whitlam	Labor	Werriwa (NSW)	8 February 1967	2 December 1972	Gorton 1968–1971	
17	Gough Whitlam	Labor	Werriwa (NSW)	8 February 1967	2 December 1972	McMahon 1971–1972	
18	Billy Snedden	Liberal	Bruce (Vic.)	20 December 1972	21 March 1975	Whitlam 1972–1975	
19	Malcolm Fraser	Liberal	Wannon (Vic.)	21 March 1975	11 November 1975	Whitlam 1972–1975	
(17)	Gough Whitlam (Note: Gough Whitlam refused to use the title Leader of the Opposition between the dismissal of his government in November 1975 and the first meeting of the new parliament in February 1976. During the election campaign in December 1975 he styled himself as the Leader of the Majority in the House of Representatives.)	Labor	Werriwa (NSW)	11 November 1975	22 December 1977	Fraser 1975–1983	
20	Bill Hayden	Labor	Oxley (Qld)	22 December 1977	8 February 1983	Fraser 1975–1983	
21	Bob Hawke	Labor	Wills (Vic.)	8 February 1983	11 March 1983	Fraser 1975–1983	
22	Andrew Peacock	Liberal	Kooyong (Vic.)	11 March 1983	5 September 1985	Hawke 1983–1991	
23	John Howard	Liberal	Bennelong (NSW)	5 September 1985	9 May 1989	Hawke 1983–1991	
(22)	Andrew Peacock	Liberal	Kooyong (Vic.)	9 May 1989	3 April 1990	Hawke 1983–1991	
24	John Hewson	Liberal	Wentworth (NSW)	3 April 1990	23 May 1994	Hawke 1983–1991	
24	John Hewson	Liberal	Wentworth (NSW)	3 April 1990	23 May 1994	Keating 1991–1996	
25	Alexander Downer	Liberal	Mayo (SA)	23 May 1994	30 January 1995	Keating 1991–1996	
(23)	John Howard	Liberal	Bennelong (NSW)	30 January 1995	11 March 1996	Keating 1991–1996	
26	Kim Beazley	Labor	Brand (WA)	19 March 1996	22 November 2001	Howard 1996–2007	
27	Simon Crean	Labor	Hotham (Vic.)	22 November 2001	2 December 2003	Howard 1996–2007	
28	Mark Latham	Labor	Werriwa (NSW)	2 December 2003	18 January 2005	Howard 1996–2007	
(26)	Kim Beazley	Labor	Brand (WA)	28 January 2005	4 December 2006	Howard 1996–2007	
29	Kevin Rudd	Labor	Griffith (Qld)	4 December 2006	3 December 2007	Howard 1996–2007	
30	Brendan Nelson	Liberal	Bradfield (NSW)	3 December 2007	16 September 2008	Rudd 2007–2010	
31	Malcolm Turnbull	Liberal	Wentworth (NSW)	16 September 2008	1 December 2009	Rudd 2007–2010	
32	Tony Abbott	Liberal	Warringah (NSW)	1 December 2009	18 September 2013	Rudd 2007–2010	
32	Tony Abbott	Liberal	Warringah (NSW)	1 December 2009	18 September 2013	Gillard 2010–2013	
32	Tony Abbott	Liberal	Warringah (NSW)	1 December 2009	18 September 2013	Rudd 2013	
–	Chris Bowen (acting)	Labor	McMahon (NSW)	18 September 2013	13 October 2013	Abbott 2013–2015	
33	Bill Shorten	Labor	Maribyrnong (Vic)	13 October 2013	30 May 2019	Abbott 2013–2015	
33	Bill Shorten	Labor	Maribyrnong (Vic)	13 October 2013	30 May 2019	Turnbull 2015–2018	
33	Bill Shorten	Labor	Maribyrnong (Vic)	13 October 2013	30 May 2019	Morrison 2018–2022	
34	Anthony Albanese	Labor	Grayndler (NSW)	30 May 2019	23 May 2022	Morrison 2018–2022	
35	Peter Dutton	Liberal	Dickson (Qld)	30 May 2022	3 May 2025	Albanese 2022–	
36	Sussan Ley	Liberal	Farrer (NSW)	13 May 2025	13 February 2026	Albanese 2022–	
37	Angus Taylor	Liberal	Hume (NSW)	13 February 2026	Incumbent	Albanese 2022–	

== List of deputy leaders of the opposition ==
Deputy Leader	Party	Constituency	Took office	Left office	Leader	Ref
Joseph Cook	Commonwealth Liberal	Parramatta (NSW)	26 May 1909	2 June 1909	Deakin 1909	
Gregor McGregor	Labor	South Australia (Senate)	2 June 1909	29 April 1910	Fisher 1909–1910	
Joseph Cook	Commonwealth Liberal	Parramatta (NSW)	1 July 1910	20 January 1913	Deakin 1910–1913	
Sir John Forrest	Commonwealth Liberal	Swan (WA)	20 January 1913	24 June 1913	Cook 1913	
Gregor McGregor	Labor	South Australia (Senate)	8 July 1913	7 September 1914	Fisher 1913–1914	
Sir John Forrest	Commonwealth Liberal	Swan (WA)	8 October 1914	17 February 1917	Cook 1914–1917	
Albert Gardiner	Labor	New South Wales (Senate)	17 February 1917	March 1927	Tudor 1917–1922	
Albert Gardiner	Labor	New South Wales (Senate)	17 February 1917	March 1927	Charlton 1922–1928	
James Scullin	Labor	Yarra (Vic.)	17 March 1927	29 March 1928	Charlton 1922–1928	
Arthur Blakeley	Labor	Darling (NSW)	29 March 1928	1929	Scullin 1928–1929	
Ted Theodore	Labor	Dalley (NSW)	1929	22 October 1929	Scullin 1928–1929	
Henry Gullett	Nationalist	Henty (Vic.)	20 November 1929	7 May 1931	Latham 1929–1931	
John Latham	United Australia	Kooyong (Vic.)	7 May 1931	6 January 1932	Lyons 1931–1932	
Frank Forde	Labor	Capricornia (Qld)	7 January 1932	7 October 1941	Scullin 1932–1935	
Frank Forde	Labor	Capricornia (Qld)	7 January 1932	7 October 1941	Curtin 1935–1941	
Billy Hughes	United Australia	North Sydney (NSW)	9 October 1941	14 April 1944	Fadden 1941–1943	
Billy Hughes	United Australia	North Sydney (NSW)	9 October 1941	14 April 1944	Menzies 1943–1949	
Eric Harrison	United Australia	Wentworth (NSW)	14 April 1944	19 December 1949	Menzies 1943–1949	
Eric Harrison	Liberal	Wentworth (NSW)	14 April 1944	19 December 1949	Menzies 1943–1949	
H. V. Evatt	Labor	Barton (NSW)	19 December 1949	13 June 1951	Chifley 1949–1951	
Arthur Calwell	Labor	Melbourne (Vic.)	13 June 1951	9 February 1960	Evatt 1951–1960	
Gough Whitlam	Labor	Werriwa (NSW)	7 March 1960	8 February 1967	Calwell 1960–1967	
Lance Barnard	Labor	Bass (Tas.)	8 February 1967	5 December 1972	Whitlam 1967–1972	
Phillip Lynch	Liberal	Flinders (Vic.)	20 December 1972	11 November 1975	Snedden 1972–1975	
Phillip Lynch	Liberal	Flinders (Vic.)	20 December 1972	11 November 1975	Fraser 1975	
Frank Crean	Labor	Melbourne Ports (Vic.)	11 November 1975	22 December 1975	Whitlam 1975–1977	
Tom Uren	Labor	Reid (NSW)	22 December 1975	22 December 1977	Whitlam 1975–1977	
Lionel Bowen	Labor	Kingsford Smith (NSW)	22 December 1977	11 March 1983	Hayden 1977–1983	
Lionel Bowen	Labor	Kingsford Smith (NSW)	22 December 1977	11 March 1983	Hawke 1983	
John Howard	Liberal	Bennelong (NSW)	11 March 1983	5 September 1985	Peacock 1983–1985	
Neil Brown	Liberal	Menzies (Vic.)	5 September 1985	17 July 1987	Howard 1985–1989	
Andrew Peacock	Liberal	Kooyong (Vic.)	17 July 1987	9 May 1989	Howard 1985–1989	
Fred Chaney	Liberal	Western Australia (Senate; 1989–1990); Pearce (WA; 1990)	9 May 1989	3 April 1990	Peacock 1989–1990	
Peter Reith	Liberal	Flinders (Vic.)	3 April 1990	23 March 1993	Hewson 1990–1994	
Michael Wooldridge	Liberal	Chisholm (Vic.)	23 March 1993	23 May 1994	Hewson 1990–1994	
Peter Costello	Liberal	Higgins (Vic.)	23 May 1994	11 March 1996	Downer 1994–1995	
Peter Costello	Liberal	Higgins (Vic.)	23 May 1994	11 March 1996	Howard 1995–1996	
Gareth Evans	Labor	Holt (Vic.)	19 March 1996	19 October 1998	Beazley 1996–2001	
Simon Crean	Labor	Hotham (Vic.)	19 October 1998	22 November 2001	Beazley 1996–2001	
Jenny Macklin	Labor	Jagajaga (Vic.)	22 November 2001	18 September 2006	Crean 2001–2003	
Jenny Macklin	Labor	Jagajaga (Vic.)	22 November 2001	18 September 2006	Latham 2003–2005	
Jenny Macklin	Labor	Jagajaga (Vic.)	22 November 2001	18 September 2006	Beazley 2005–2006	
Julia Gillard	Labor	Lalor (Vic.)	4 December 2006	3 December 2007	Rudd 2006–2007	
Julie Bishop	Liberal	Curtin (WA)	3 December 2007	18 September 2013	Nelson 2007–2008	
Julie Bishop	Liberal	Curtin (WA)	3 December 2007	18 September 2013	Turnbull 2008–2009	
Julie Bishop	Liberal	Curtin (WA)	3 December 2007	18 September 2013	Abbott 2009–2013	
Tanya Plibersek	Labor	Sydney (NSW)	14 October 2013	30 May 2019	Shorten 2013–2019	
Richard Marles	Labor	Corio (Vic.)	30 May 2019	23 May 2022	Albanese 2019–2022	
Sussan Ley	Liberal	Farrer (NSW)	30 May 2022	13 May 2025	Dutton 2022–2025	
Ted O'Brien	Liberal	Fairfax (Qld)	13 May 2025	13 February 2026	Ley 2025–2026	
Jane Hume (Note: The position of "Deputy Leader in the House of Representatives" is held by Andrew Hastie. As Hume is a member of the Senate, it was necessary to elect a House-only deputy for procedural reasons.)	Liberal	Victoria (Senate)	13 February 2026	Incumbent	Taylor 2026–	

== See also ==
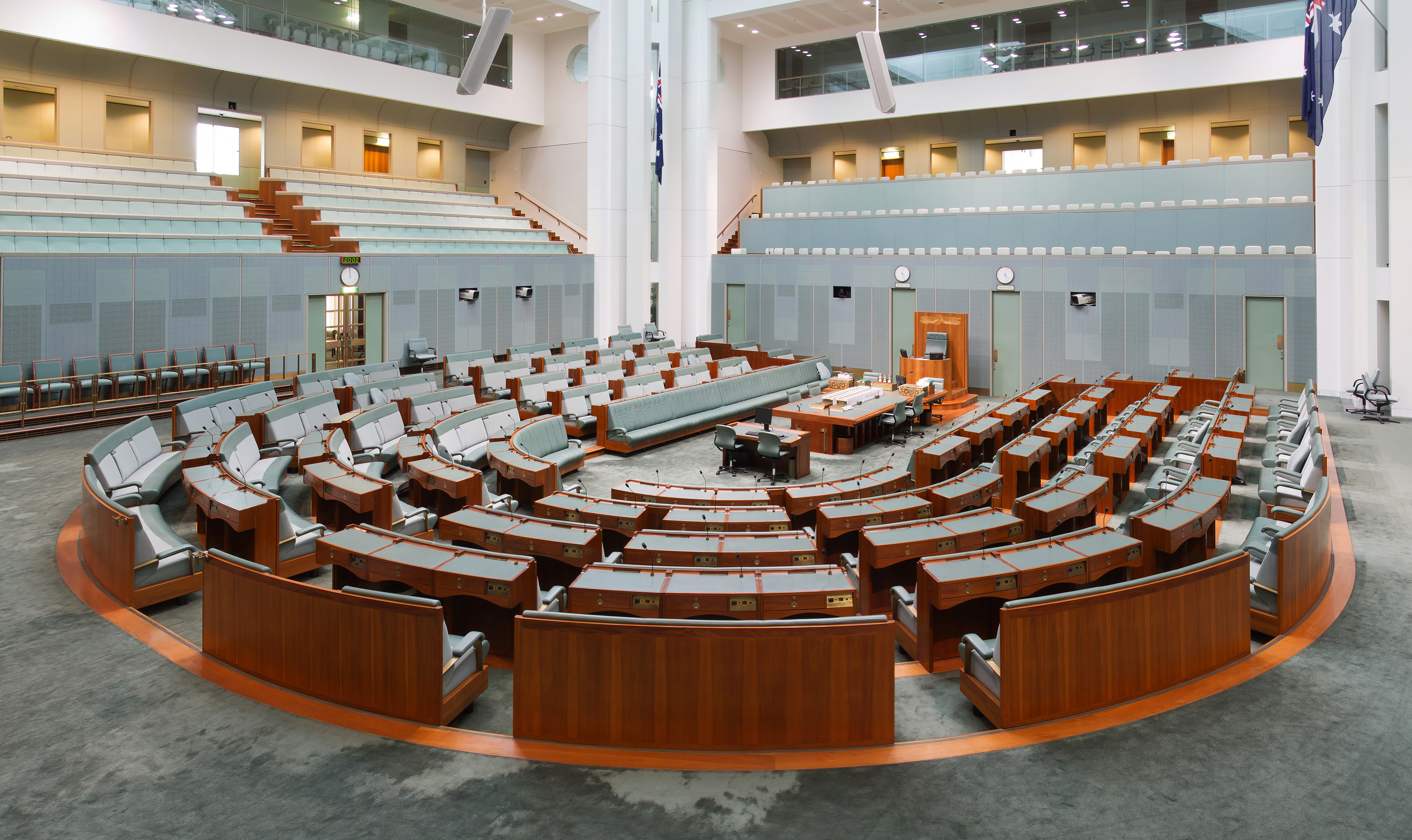
In the Australian House of Representatives, the Leader of the Opposition sits at the front table to the left of the Speaker's chair (on the right-hand side in this photo).

- List of prime ministers of Australia
- Politics of Australia
