= 1975 Australian federal election =

- 13 December 1975

All 127 seats of the House of Representatives 64 seats were needed for a majority in the House All 64 seats of the Senate
- Registered: 8,262,413 ▲4.62%
- Turnout: 7,881,873 (95.39%) (▼0.03 pp)
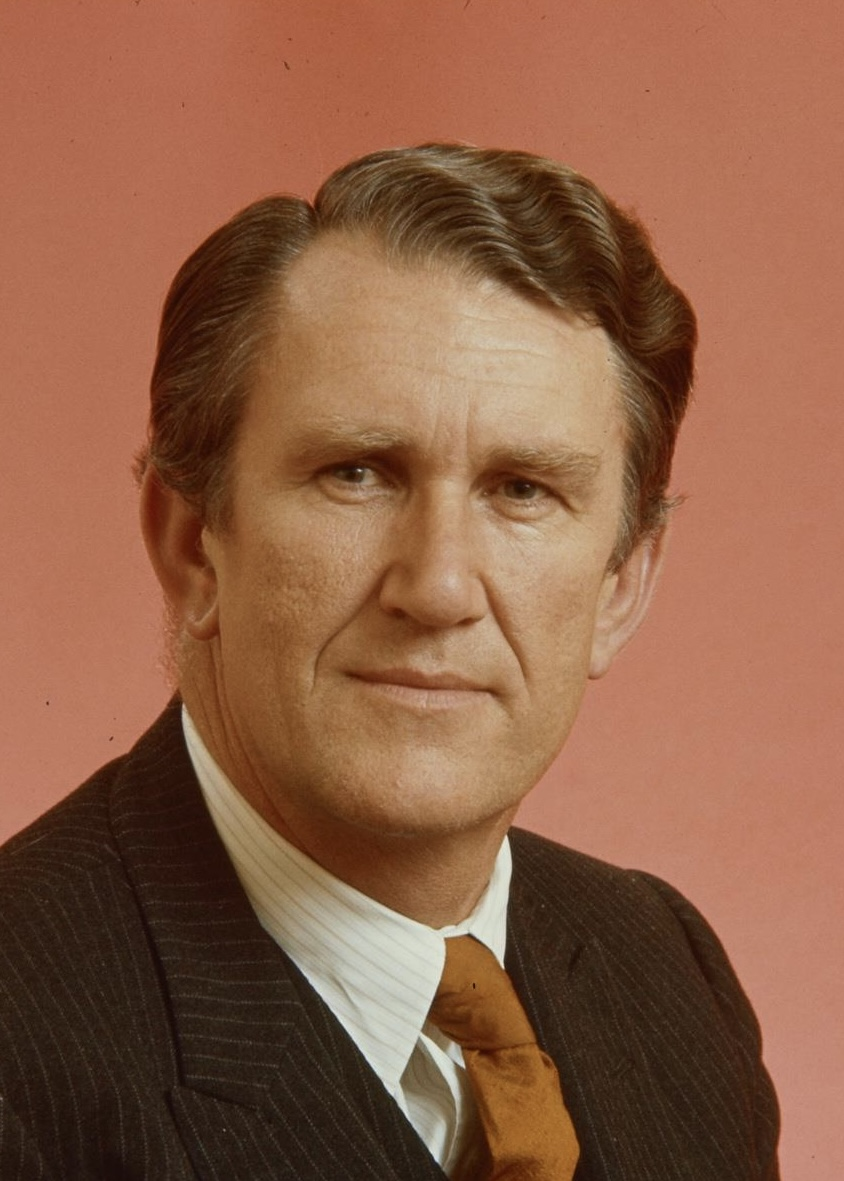

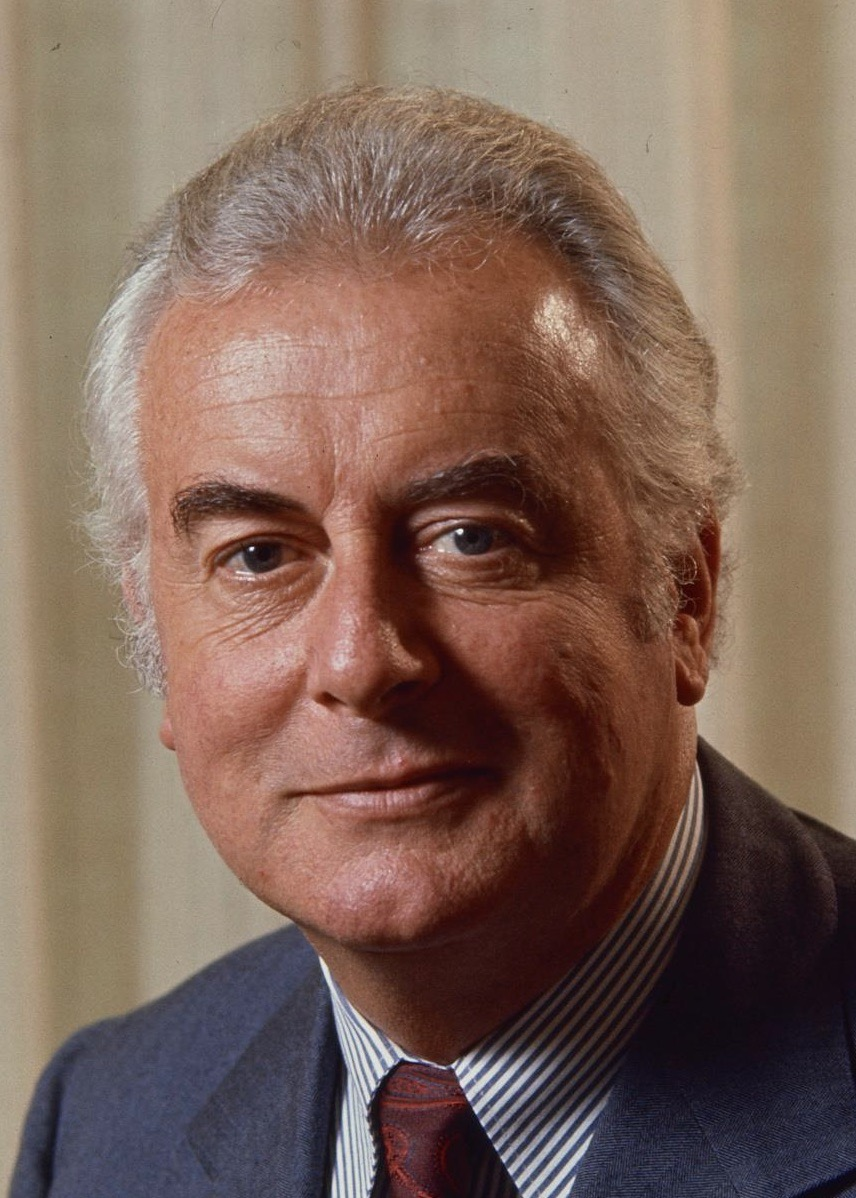
	First party	Second party
Leader	Malcolm Fraser	Gough Whitlam
Party	Liberal–National Country Coalition	Labor
Leader since	21 March 1975	8 February 1967
Leader's seat	Wannon (Vic.)	Werriwa (NSW)
Last election	61 seats	66 seats
Seats won	91 seats	36 seats
Seat change	▲30	▼30
Primary vote	4,102,078	3,313,004
Percentage	53.05%	42.84%
Swing	▲7.32	▼6.46
TPP	55.70%	44.30%
TPP swing	▲7.40	▼7.40
- Results by division for the House of Representatives, shaded by winning party's margin of victory.
Prime Minister before election
Malcolm Fraser
Liberal/NCP coalition
Subsequent Prime Minister
Malcolm Fraser
Liberal/NCP coalition

A federal election was held in Australia on 13 December 1975. All 127 seats in the House of Representatives and all 64 seats in the Senate were up for election, due to a double dissolution.

Malcolm Fraser had been commissioned as caretaker prime minister following the dismissal of Gough Whitlam's three-year-old Labor government by Governor-General Sir John Kerr, on 11 November 1975. The same day, Fraser advised an immediate double dissolution, in accordance with Kerr's stipulated conditions (see 1975 Australian constitutional crisis).

The Coalition of Fraser's Liberal Party of Australia and Doug Anthony's National Country Party secured government in its own right, winning the largest majority government to date in Australian history. (Note: While the Coalition under John Howard and Labor under Anthony Albanese won 94 seats in 1996 and 2025 respectively, this only accounted for 63.51% and 62.66% of all seats in the House of Representatives, as there were 148 seats in 1996 and 150 in 2025. The Coalition under Fraser won 91 seats, which, although smaller than 94, accounted for 71.65% of the House of Representatives, which had 127 seats in 1975. Therefore, while Howard and Albanese won three more seats than Fraser in 1996 and 2025, Fraser still won a larger majority.) The Liberals actually won a majority in their own right, with 68 seats–the first time that the main non-Labor party had done so since adopting the Liberal banner in 1944. Although Fraser had no need for the support of the National Country Party, the Coalition was retained. It was also the first time a party won over 90 seats at an Australian election. This is the last federal election that any party has won more than 50% of the primary (first preference) vote.

Labor suffered a 30-seat swing and saw its lower house caucus cut almost in half, to 36 seats—fewer than it had when Whitlam became leader in the aftermath of the Coalition landslide nearly 10 years earlier, in the 1966 election. With only 28% of the House of Representatives seats, this was the worst seat share for Labor since the current Liberal-Labor party contest from 1946.

The fact that Whitlam was already a former prime minister coming into this election has often been overlooked or forgotten with Whitlam seemingly treated as the incumbent at this election in retrospectives.

== Results ==
=== House of Representatives results ===
Government (91) Coalition Liberal (68) NCP (22) CLP (1) Opposition (36) Labor (36)

House of Reps (IRV) – 1975–77—Turnout 95.39% (CV) – Informal 1.89%
Party	First preference votes	%	Swing	Seats	Change
Liberal–NCP coalition	4,102,078	53.05	+7.32	91	+30
Liberal	3,232,159	41.80	+6.85	68	+28
National Country	853,943	11.04	+0.28	22	+1
Country Liberal	15,976	0.21	+0.21	1	+1
Labor	3,313,004	42.84	−6.46	36	−30
Democratic Labor	101,750	1.32	−0.10	0	0
Workers	60,130	0.78	+0.78	0	0
Liberal Movement	49,484	0.64	–0.14	0	0
Australia	33,630	0.43	−1.89	0	0
Communist	9,393	0.12	+0.11	0	0
Independent	63,109	0.82	+0.42	0	0
Total	7,732,578			127	
Two-party-preferred (estimated)
Liberal–NCP coalition	Win	55.70	+7.40	91	+30
Labor		44.30	−7.40	36	−30

First preference vote
Labor	42.84%
Liberal	41.80%
National	11.25%
DLP	1.32%
Other	2.79%

Two-party-preferred vote
Coalition	55.70%
Labor	44.30%

Parliament seats
Coalition	71.65%
Labor	28.35%

=== Senate results ===
Government (35) Coalition Liberal (26) NCP (8) CLP (1) Opposition (27) Labor (27) Crossbench (2) Liberal Movement (1) Independent (1)

Senate (STV) – 1975–77—Turnout 95.39% (CV) – Informal 9.10%
Party	First preference votes	%	Swing	Seats won	Seats held	Change
Liberal–NCP coalition (total)	3,706,989	51.74	+7.85	35	35	+6
Liberal–NCP joint ticket	2,855,721	39.86	+5.09	17	*	*
Liberal	793,772	11.08	+3.26	16	26	+3
National Country	41,977	0.59	−0.71	1	8	+2
Country Liberal	15,519	0.22	+0.22	1	1	+1
Labor	2,931,310	40.91	−6.38	27	27	−2
Democratic Labor	191,049	2.67	−0.89	0	0	0
Liberal Movement	76,426	1.07	+0.11	1	1	0
Workers	62,385	0.87	+0.87	0	0	0
Family Movement	45,658	0.64	+0.64	0	0	0
Australia	34,632	0.48	–0.91	0	0	0
United Tasmania	1,227	0.02	–0.01	0	0	0
Socialist	727	0.01	+0.01	0	0	0
Independents	114,310	1.60	–0.52	1	1	0
Total	7,164,713			64	64	+4

Notes

- Independent: Brian Harradine (Tasmania)

== Seats changing hands ==
Seat	Pre-1975			Swing	Post-1975		
Seat	Party	Member	Margin	Swing	Margin	Member	Party
Barton, NSW	Labor	Len Reynolds	5.1	10.0	4.9	Jim Bradfield	Liberal
Bowman, Qld	Labor	Len Keogh	1.3	8.4	7.1	David Jull	Liberal
Braddon, Tas	Labor	Ron Davies	4.8	8.6	3.8	Ray Groom	Liberal
Brisbane, Qld	Labor	Manfred Cross	1.1	5.0	3.9	Peter Johnson	Liberal
Canberra, ACT	Labor	Kep Enderby	7.1	10.4	3.3	John Haslem	Liberal
Capricornia, Qld	Labor	Doug Everingham	4.9	5.0	0.1	Colin Carige	National Country
Casey, Vic	Labor	Race Mathews	1.5	9.0	7.5	Peter Falconer	Liberal
Cook, NSW	Labor	Ray Thorburn	0.5	8.3	7.8	Don Dobie	Liberal
Dawson, Qld	Labor	Rex Patterson	0.6	4.2	3.6	Ray Braithwaite	National Country
Denison, Tas	Labor	John Coates	2.8	7.7	4.9	Michael Hodgman	Liberal
Diamond Valley, Vic	Labor	David McKenzie	0.7	9.8	9.1	Neil Brown	Liberal
Eden-Monaro, NSW	Labor	Bob Whan	0.1	5.6	5.5	Murray Sainsbury	Liberal
Evans, NSW	Labor	Allan Mulder	4.9	6.9	2.0	John Abel	Liberal
Franklin, Tas	Labor	Ray Sherry	12.9	14.7	1.8	Bruce Goodluck	Liberal
Henty, Vic	Labor	Joan Child	1.5	6.7	5.2	Ken Aldred	Liberal
Holt, Vic	Labor	Max Oldmeadow	6.9	8.5	1.6	William Yates	Liberal
Isaacs, Vic	Labor	Gareth Clayton	0.6	7.5	6.9	David Hamer	Liberal
Kalgoorlie, WA	Labor	Fred Collard	2.1	6.3	4.3	Mick Cotter	Liberal
Kingston, SA	Labor	Richard Gun	6.1	12.7	6.6	Grant Chapman	Liberal
La Trobe, Vic	Labor	Tony Lamb	4.6	8.9	4.3	Marshall Baillieu	Liberal
Leichhardt, Qld	Labor	Bill Fulton	3.3	5.7	2.4	David Thomson	National Country
Macarthur, NSW	Labor	John Kerin	4.4	8.5	4.1	Michael Baume	Liberal
Macquarie, NSW	Labor	Tony Luchetti	8.7	10.3	1.6	Reg Gillard	Liberal
McMillan, Vic	National Country	Arthur Hewson	N/A	2.1	6.7	Barry Simon	Liberal
Perth, WA	Labor	Joe Berinson	8.2	9.0	0.8	Ross McLean	Liberal
Phillip, NSW	Labor	Joe Riordan	4.5	7.1	2.6	Jack Birney	Liberal
St George, NSW	Labor	Bill Morrison	5.8	5.8	0.0	Maurice Neil	Liberal
Swan, WA	Labor	Adrian Bennett	5.6	7.7	2.1	John Martyr	Liberal
Tangney, WA	Labor	John Dawkins	3.1	9.7	6.6	Peter Richardson	Liberal
Wilmot, TAS	Labor	Gil Duthie	2.7	8.0	5.3	Max Burr	Liberal

- Members listed in italics did not contest their seat at this election.

== Issues and significance ==
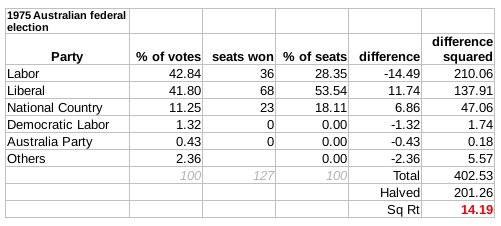
The Gallagher Index result: 14.19

The election followed the dismissal of the Whitlam government by Governor-General Sir John Kerr in the 1975 constitutional crisis. Labor campaigners hoped that the electorate would "maintain [its] rage" and punish the Coalition for its part in bringing down the government, proclaiming "Shame Fraser, Shame". However, the Coalition focused on economic issues following the 1973 oil crisis and 1973–75 recession, the Loans Affair, alleged Labor mismanagement of inflation, and campaigned under the slogan "Turn on the lights, Australia" (drawing on a contemporary cynicism: "Would the last businessman leaving Australia please turn out the lights?").

Printers at News Limited went on strike to protest against anti-Labor editorials in the company's papers. News Limited's support for Fraser and the Liberals during the campaign resulted in its journalists conducting a two-day strike beginning on 8 December 1975 in protest at "bias and dishonesty" in the company’s coverage of the election.

The Australian Capital Territory and the Northern Territory received an entitlement to elect two senators each as a consequence of the Senate (Representation of Territories) Act 1973, passed during the 1974 Joint Sitting of the Australian Parliament.

== See also ==
- Candidates of the Australian federal election, 1975
- Members of the Australian House of Representatives, 1975–1977
- Members of the Australian Senate, 1975–1978
