= Members of the Australian House of Representatives, 1975–1977 =

This is a list of members of the Australian House of Representatives from 1975 to 1977. The 13 December 1975 election was a double dissolution of both Houses, with all 127 seats in the House of Representatives, and all 64 seats in the Senate were up for election. Malcolm Fraser had been commissioned as prime minister following the dismissal of the Prime Minister Gough Whitlam's three-year-old Labor government by Governor-General Sir John Kerr, on 11 November 1975. The same day, Fraser advised the calling of the election, in accordance with Kerr's stipulated conditions. Thus the Liberal Party of Australia, led by Fraser, with coalition partner the National Country Party, led by Doug Anthony, went to the election as a minority caretaker government. The election resulted in the Coalition securing government with a 30-seat swing in the House of Representatives away from Labor.

Member	Party	Electorate	State	In office
John Abel	Liberal	Evans	NSW	1975–1977
Evan Adermann	National	Fisher	Qld	1972–1990
Ken Aldred	Liberal	Henty	Vic	1975–1980, 1983–1990
Doug Anthony	National	Richmond	NSW	1957–1984
John Armitage	Labor	Chifley	NSW	1961–1963, 1969–1983
Marshall Baillieu	Liberal	La Trobe	Vic	1975–1980
Michael Baume	Liberal	Macarthur	NSW	1975–1983
Kim Beazley Sr.	Labor	Fremantle	WA	1945–1977
Jack Birney	Liberal	Phillip	NSW	1975–1983
Robert Bonnett	Liberal	Herbert	Qld	1966–1977
John Bourchier	Liberal	Bendigo	Vic	1972–1983
Lionel Bowen	Labor	Kingsford-Smith	NSW	1969–1990
Jim Bradfield	Liberal	Barton	NSW	1975–1983
Ray Braithwaite	National	Dawson	Qld	1975–1996
Neil Brown	Liberal	Diamond Valley	Vic	1969–1972, 1975–1991
Gordon Bryant	Labor	Wills	Vic	1955–1980
Mel Bungey	Liberal	Canning	WA	1974–1983
Max Burr	Liberal	Wilmot	Tas	1975–1993
Alan Cadman	Liberal	Mitchell	NSW	1974–2007
Jim Cairns	Labor	Lalor	Vic	1955–1977
Kevin Cairns	Liberal	Lilley	Qld	1963–1972, 1974–1980
Sam Calder	Country Liberal	Northern Territory	NT	1966–1980
Clyde Cameron	Labor	Hindmarsh	SA	1949–1980
Don Cameron	Liberal	Griffith	Qld	1966–1990
Colin Carige	National	Capricornia	Qld	1975–1977
Moss Cass	Labor	Maribyrnong	Vic	1969–1983
Grant Chapman	Liberal	Kingston	SA	1975–1983
Don Chipp	Liberal	Hotham	Vic	1960–1977
Barry Cohen	Labor	Robertson	NSW	1969–1990
David Connolly	Liberal	Bradfield	NSW	1974–1996
Rex Connor ^{1}	Labor	Cunningham	NSW	1963–1977
James Corbett	National	Maranoa	Qld	1966–1980
Mick Cotter	Liberal	Kalgoorlie	WA	1975–1980
Frank Crean	Labor	Melbourne Ports	Vic	1951–1977
Don Dobie	Liberal	Cook	NSW	1966–1972, 1975–1996
Peter Drummond	Liberal	Forrest	WA	1972–1987
Harry Edwards	Liberal	Berowra	NSW	1972–1993
Bob Ellicott	Liberal	Wentworth	NSW	1974–1981
Peter Falconer	Liberal	Casey	Vic	1975–1983
Wal Fife	Liberal	Farrer	NSW	1975–1993
Peter Fisher	National	Mallee	Vic	1972–1993
John FitzPatrick	Labor	Darling	NSW	1969–1980
Malcolm Fraser	Liberal	Wannon	Vic	1955–1984
Ken Fry	Labor	Fraser	ACT	1974–1984
Victor Garland	Liberal	Curtin	WA	1969–1981
Horrie Garrick	Labor	Batman	Vic	1969–1977
Geoffrey Giles	Liberal	Angas	SA	1964–1983
Reg Gillard	Liberal	Macquarie	NSW	1975–1980
Bruce Goodluck	Liberal	Franklin	Tas	1975–1993
Bill Graham	Liberal	North Sydney	NSW	1949–1954, 1955–1958, 1966–1980
Ray Groom	Liberal	Braddon	Tas	1975–1984
David Hamer	Liberal	Isaacs	Vic	1969–1974, 1975–1977
John Haslem	Liberal	Canberra	ACT	1975–1980
Bill Hayden	Labor	Oxley	Qld	1961–1988
John Hodges	Liberal	Petrie	Qld	1974–1983, 1984–1987
Michael Hodgman	Liberal	Denison	Tas	1975–1987
Mac Holten	National	Indi	Vic	1958–1977
John Howard	Liberal	Bennelong	NSW	1974–2007
Ralph Hunt	National	Gwydir	NSW	1969–1989
Chris Hurford	Labor	Adelaide	SA	1969–1988
John Hyde	Liberal	Moore	WA	1974–1983
Ted Innes	Labor	Melbourne	Vic	1972–1983
Ralph Jacobi	Labor	Hawker	SA	1969–1987
Bert James	Labor	Hunter	NSW	1960–1980
Alan Jarman	Liberal	Deakin	Vic	1966–1983
Harry Jenkins Sr.	Labor	Scullin	Vic	1969–1985
Keith Johnson	Labor	Burke	Vic	1969–1980
Les Johnson	Labor	Hughes	NSW	1955–1966, 1969–1984
Peter Johnson	Liberal	Brisbane	Qld	1975–1980
Charles Jones	Labor	Newcastle	NSW	1958–1983
David Jull	Liberal	Bowman	Qld	1975–1983, 1984–2007
Bob Katter Sr.	National	Kennedy	Qld	1966–1990
Paul Keating	Labor	Blaxland	NSW	1969–1996
Bert Kelly	Liberal	Wakefield	SA	1958–1977
James Killen	Liberal	Moreton	Qld	1955–1983
Robert King	National	Wimmera	Vic	1958–1977
Dick Klugman	Labor	Prospect	NSW	1969–1990
Bruce Lloyd	National	Murray	Vic	1971–1996
Philip Lucock	Country	Lyne	NSW	1952–1980
Stephen Lusher	Country	Hume	NSW	1974–1984
Phillip Lynch	Liberal	Flinders	Vic	1966–1982
Michael MacKellar	Liberal	Warringah	NSW	1969–1994
Sandy Mackenzie	National	Calare	NSW	1975–1983
Ian Macphee	Liberal	Balaclava	Vic	1974–1990
Vince Martin	Labor	Banks	NSW	1969–1980
John Martyr	Liberal	Swan	WA	1975–1980
Ross McLean	Liberal	Perth	WA	1975–1983
John McLeay	Liberal	Boothby	SA	1966–1981
Les McMahon	Labor	Sydney	NSW	1975–1983
William McMahon	Liberal	Lowe	NSW	1949–1982
Tom McVeigh	National	Darling Downs	Qld	1972–1988
Clarrie Millar	National	Wide Bay	Qld	1974–1990
John Moore	Liberal	Ryan	Qld	1975–2001
Peter Morris	Labor	Shortland	NSW	1972–1998
Maurice Neil	Liberal	St George	NSW	1975–1980
Kevin Newman	Liberal	Bass	Tas	1975–1984
Martin Nicholls	Labor	Bonython	SA	1963–1977
Peter Nixon	National	Gippsland	Vic	1961–1983
Frank O'Keefe	National	Paterson	NSW	1969–1984
Andrew Peacock	Liberal	Kooyong	Vic	1966–1994
James Porter	Liberal	Barker	SA	1975–1990
Peter Richardson	Liberal	Tangney	WA	1975–1977
Eric Robinson	Liberal	McPherson	Qld	1972–1990
Ian Robinson	National	Cowper	NSW	1963–1981
Philip Ruddock	Liberal	Parramatta	NSW	1973–2016
Murray Sainsbury	Liberal	Eden-Monaro	NSW	1975–1983
Gordon Scholes	Labor	Corio	Vic	1967–1993
Roger Shipton	Liberal	Higgins	Vic	1975–1990
Jim Short	Liberal	Ballaarat	Vic	1975–1980
Barry Simon	Liberal	McMillan	Vic	1975–1980
Ian Sinclair	National	New England	NSW	1963–1998
Sir Billy Snedden	Liberal	Bruce	Vic	1955–1983
Tony Staley	Liberal	Chisholm	Vic	1970–1980
Frank Stewart	Labor	Lang	NSW	1953–1979
Tony Street	Liberal	Corangamite	Vic	1966–1984
John Sullivan	National	Riverina	NSW	1974–1977
David Thomson	National	Leichhardt	Qld	1975–1983
Tom Uren	Labor	Reid	NSW	1958–1990
Ian Viner	Liberal	Stirling	WA	1972–1983
Laurie Wallis	Labor	Grey	SA	1969–1983
Bill Wentworth	Liberal	Mackellar	NSW	1949–1977
Stewart West ^{1}	Labor	Cunningham	NSW	1977–1993
Gough Whitlam	Labor	Werriwa	NSW	1952–1978
Tony Whitlam	Labor	Grayndler	NSW	1975–1977
Ralph Willis	Labor	Gellibrand	Vic	1972–1998
Ian Wilson	Liberal	Sturt	SA	1966–1969, 1972–1993
William Yates	Liberal	Holt	Vic	1975–1980
Mick Young	Labor	Port Adelaide	SA	1974–1988

^{1} Labor member Rex Connor died on 22 August 1977; Labor candidate Stewart West won the resulting by-election on 15 October 1977.
