= James Monaghan =

Australian politician

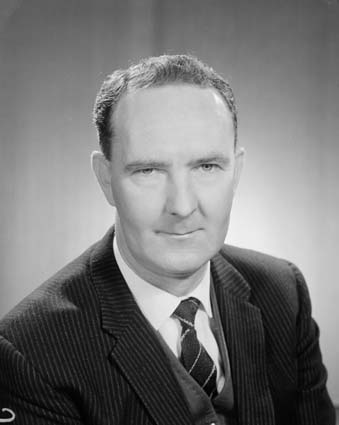

Member of the Australian Parliament for Evans
- In office 9 December 1961 – 30 November 1963
- Preceded by: Frederick Osborne
- Succeeded by: Malcolm Mackay

Personal details
- Born: 20 September 1921 Sydney
- Died: July 2007 Sydney
- Party: Australian Labor Party
- Occupation: Public servant, barrister

James Edward Monaghan (20 September 1921 – July 2007) was an Australian politician. Born in Sydney, he attended Catholic schools and then the University of Sydney. He was a public servant and barrister before entering politics. In 1961, he was elected to the Australian House of Representatives as the Labor member for Evans, defeating the sitting Liberal member, Frederick Osborne. He held the seat until 1963, when he was defeated by Liberal Malcolm Mackay. Monaghan returned to law after leaving politics.

Parliament of Australia
| Preceded by Frederick Osborne | Member for Evans; 1961–1963 | Succeeded by Malcolm Mackay |
