= Frederick Osborne =

Australian politician

The Honourable Frederick Osborne CMG, DSC & Bar, VRD
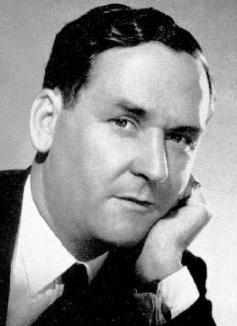

Member of the Australian Parliament for Evans
- In office 10 December 1949 – 9 December 1961
- Preceded by: New seat
- Succeeded by: James Monaghan

Personal details
- Born: 20 January 1909 Orange, New South Wales
- Died: 23 July 1996 (aged 87)
- Party: Liberal Party of Australia
- Spouse: Elizabeth
- Education: University of Sydney
- Occupation: Naval officer

Military service
- Allegiance: Australia
- Branch/service: Royal Australian Naval Volunteer Reserve
- Years of service: 1938–1967
- Rank: Commander
- Commands: HMS Peacock (1945); HMS Vanquisher (1943–45); HMS Gentian (1941–43)
- Battles/wars: Second World War; Operation Alphabet; Battle of the Atlantic
- Awards: Distinguished Service Cross & Bar; Volunteer Reserve Decoration

Frederick Meares Osborne CMG, DSC & Bar, VRD (20 January 1909 – 23 July 1996) was an Australian lawyer, politician and company director. He was a member of the House of Representatives from 1949 to 1961, representing the New South Wales seat of Evans for the Liberal Party. He held ministerial office in the Menzies government as Minister for Customs and Excise (1956), Air (1956–1960), and Repatriation (1960–1961)

== Early life ==
Osborne was born on 20 January 1909 in Mosman, New South Wales. He was the youngest of six children born to Eleanor Mary (née Scott) and William Alexander Osborne.

Osborne and his family moved to Orange, New South Wales, when he was an infant. His father, a bank manager, died when he was two years old and the family was supported by his older brothers. He began his education at Orange Primary School, before the family returned to Mosman in 1918. He attended Mosman Public School before completing his secondary education at North Sydney High School (1922–1924) and Sydney Church of England Grammar School (1925–1926). Osborne went on to study law at the University of Sydney, graduating Bachelor of Arts in 1930 and Bachelor of Laws in 1934 and living at St Andrew's College on a scholarship. He subsequently joined his older brother Ronald at the firm of Dibbs, Crowther & Osborne.

== Military service ==
Osborne joined the Royal Australian Naval Volunteer Reserve in 1938, and with the outbreak of the Second World War, he was seconded to the Royal Navy in 1940. He was awarded a Distinguished Service Cross in 1940 for "bravery and devotion to duty" while assisting the evacuation of forces from Norway as a sub-lieutenant on the St Loman, an armed trawler. He then successively commanded HMS Gentian, HMS Vanquisher and HMS Peacock, escorting ships between the United States and Canada and the United Kingdom in the Battle of the Atlantic. He crossed the Atlantic 22 times and was the only Royal Australian Naval Volunteer Reserve officer to rise to the command of a Royal Navy destroyer during the war. In 1945 a Bar was added to his DSC for sinking of a German U-boat.

== Political career ==
Osborne was elected as the member for Evans at the December 1949 election as a Liberal. He was Minister for Customs and Excise from January to October 1956, Minister for Air from October 1956 to December 1960 and Minister for Repatriation from December 1960 to his defeat at the December 1961 election.

Osborne, as Minister for Air, and Keith Brennan from the Department of External Affairs, represented the Australian Government in the independence celebrations for Ghana from 2–10 March 1957.

Following his defeat he returned to his legal practice, but continued to play a major role in the New South Wales branch of the Liberal Party and was its president from 1967 to 1970. He supported a change in Liberal Party policy in favour of support for state aid for independent schools, a policy adopted by the three major national political parties by the 1972 election. He was invested as a Companion of the Order of St Michael and St George for distinguished services to government and the community.

Osborne was survived by his wife, Elizabeth and four children, Alick, Michael, Imogen and Penelope.

== Notes ==
Political offices
Preceded by Neil O'Sullivan	Minister for Customs and Excise; 1956	Succeeded by Denham Henty
Preceded by Athol Townley	Minister for Air; 1956–1960	Succeeded by Harrie Wade
Preceded by Walter Cooper	Minister for Repatriation; 1960–1961	Succeeded by Denham Henty
Parliament of Australia
New division	Member for Evans; 1949–1961	Succeeded by James Monaghan
