= Denis Mackey =

Australian medical practitioner (1934 – 1990)

- Born: Denis Peter Mackey; 8 May 1934; Richmond, Virginia, Australia
- Died: 8 January 1990 (aged 55); Hobart, Tasmania, Australia
- Education: University of Melbourne
- Occupation: Medical practitioner
- Spouse: Noelle Lucy Mooney (m. 1959)
- Children: 4
- Parent(s): Alphonsus Denis Mackey; Dulcie Edith Reid

Denis Peter Mackey (8 May 1934 – 8 January 1990) was an Australian medical practitioner.

Mackey was born at Richmond in Melbourne to commercial traveller Alphonsus Denis Mackey and Dulcie Edith, née Reid. He attended Catholic schools and studied medicine at the University of Melbourne. He married Noelle Lucy Mooney on 30 December 1959 at Middle Park before moving to Tasmania in 1960, where Mackey found work at the Royal Hobart Hospital. In 1963 he developed his own practice at Lindisfarne. He joined the General Practitioners' Society in 1973, serving as national vice-president from 1976 to 1979 and president from 1979 to 1981. He was editor of the Australian GP from 1974 to 1978 and assistant editor from 1978 to 1980.

Mackey was a strong supporter of private healthcare, opposing the introduction of Medibank and Medicare. An opponent of community health centres, he toured the United States in 1977 speaking against socialised medicine. He refused money from both Medicare and the Department of Veterans' Affairs, requiring his patients to make their own claims. In 1985 Mackey claimed that repetitive strain injury was being used by workers to claim unwarranted sick days, prompting a dispute with the Tasmanian Trades & Labor Council and the Federated Clerks' Union. Despite his vehemency he treated many patients for free. He died in 1990 in Hobart, survived by his wife and their four sons. The University of Tasmania awards an annual scholarship in his name.
