= Malcolm Mackay (Australian politician) =

Australian politician (1919–1999)

The Honourable Dr Malcolm Mackay AM
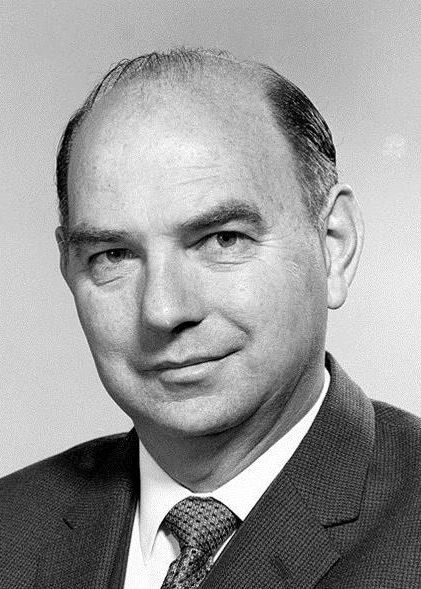

Minister for the Navy
- In office 22 March 1971 – 5 December 1972
- Prime Minister: William McMahon
- Preceded by: Jim Killen
- Succeeded by: Lance Barnard

Member of the Australian Parliament for Evans
- In office 30 November 1963 – 2 December 1972
- Preceded by: James Monaghan
- Succeeded by: Allan Mulder

Personal details
- Born: 29 December 1919 Brighton, South Australia, Australia
- Died: 8 July 1999 (aged 79) Melbourne, Victoria, Australia
- Party: Liberal Party of Australia
- Spouse: Ruth
- Occupation: Clergyman

Malcolm George Mackay AM (29 December 1919 – 8 July 1999) was an Australian clergyman and politician. He was a member of federal parliament from 1963 to 1972, representing the Liberal Party, and served as Minister for the Navy in the McMahon government. He was an ordained Presbyterian minister and prior to entering parliament served as the general secretary of the Australian division of the World Council of Churches.

== Early life ==
Mackay was born in Brighton, South Australia and educated at Adelaide Technical High School. During World War II he served in the Royal Australian Navy. After the war he earned a B.A. degree from the University of Sydney and a B.D. degree from the University of Melbourne. In 1952 he obtained a Ph.D. from the University of Edinburgh with a thesis on the Lord's Supper.

== Church activities ==
Mackay returned to Australia to be a Presbyterian minister. He was ordained and inducted to the Merbein-Wentworth parish on 1 July 1952, demitted 14 June 1954 and from 1954 until 1956, he was the Australian General Secretary for the World Council of Churches. In September 1956 he became the first Australian born minister at Sydney's Scots Church. He became the foundation Master of Basser College at the University of New South Wales in 1959. He was also one of the first prominent churchmen in Australia to pursue an active career on television. He monitored the Burning Question program on Channel 7 from 1957 until 1961 before moving to the ABC for the current affairs program Open Hearing. He was later assistant minister of the Scots Church, Melbourne, from 1975 to 1976 and from 1982 to 1984.

== Politics ==
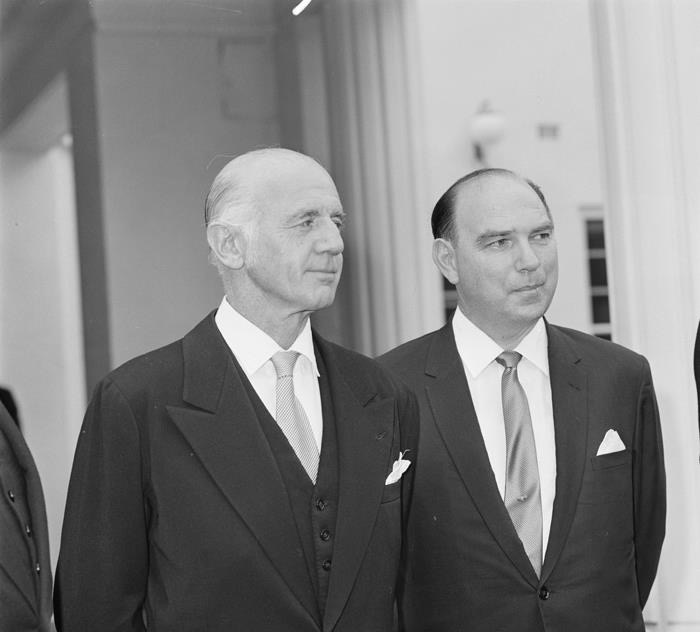
Mackay (left) with Prime Minister William McMahon on 22 March 1971

Mackay was elected as the Liberal Party member for the House of Representatives seat of Evans from the 1963 election. He was Minister for the Navy from March 1971 until his defeat by Allan Mulder at the December 1972 election. Mackay was the founding president of the Association of Former Members of the Parliament of Australia, and he remained an executive member of the association until his death.

== Personal life and honours ==
Mackay was made a Member of the Order of Australia in 1986 for "services to the community particularly in the fields of religion, education and politics."

Mackay was married and had three children. He and his wife died in a car accident in Melbourne on 8 July 1999.

== Notes ==
Parliament of Australia
Preceded by James Monaghan	Member for Evans; 1963–1972	Succeeded by Allan Mulder
