= Allan Mulder =

Australian politician

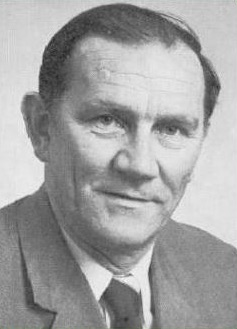

Member of the Australian Parliament for Evans
- In office 2 December 1972 – 13 December 1975
- Preceded by: Malcolm Mackay
- Succeeded by: John Abel

Personal details
- Born: 19 August 1928 Sydney
- Died: 7 November 2009 (aged 81)
- Party: Australian Labor Party
- Occupation: Systems operator

Allan William Mulder (/ˈmʌldər/; 19 August 1928 – 7 November 2009) was an Australian politician. Born in Sydney, he was a systems operator with Sydney City Council before his election to Canterbury Municipal Council, of which he was Mayor in 1967. In 1972, he was elected to the Australian House of Representatives as the Labor member for Evans, defeating Liberal MP Malcolm Mackay. Mulder held the seat until his defeat in 1975.

Civic offices
Preceded by Alfred Pate	Mayor of Canterbury; 1967–1968	Succeeded by James William Eccles
Parliament of Australia
Preceded by Malcolm Mackay	Member for Evans; 1972–1975	Succeeded by John Abel
