= Division of Evans =

Former Australian federal electoral division

Evans Australian House of Representatives Division
- Created: 1949
- Abolished: 1977
- Namesake: George Evans

The Division of Evans was an Australian Electoral Division in New South Wales. The division was created in 1949 and abolished in 1977. It was named for George Evans, an early explorer. It was located in the inner western suburbs of Sydney, including Ashfield, Croydon and Drummoyne. It was a marginal seat, held by both the Australian Labor Party and the Liberal Party.

Prior to its abolition in 1977 and except in 1961, Evans was a bellwether seat that was won by the party that formed government afterwards.

== Members ==
Image	Member	Party	Term	Notes
	Frederick Osborne (1909–1996)	Liberal	10 December 1949 – 9 December 1961	Served as minister under Menzies. Lost seat
	James Monaghan (1921–2007)	Labor	9 December 1961 – 30 November 1963	Lost seat
	Malcolm Mackay (1919–1999)	Liberal	30 November 1963 – 2 December 1972	Served as minister under McMahon. Lost seat
	Allan Mulder (1928–2009)	Labor	2 December 1972 – 13 December 1975	Lost seat
	John Abel (1939–2019)	Liberal	13 December 1975 – 10 November 1977	Failed to win preselection for the Division of Lowe when Evans was abolished in 1977
