= John Abel (politician) =

Australian politician (1939–2019)

Member of the Australian Parliament for Evans
- In office 13 December 1975 – 10 November 1977
- Preceded by: Allan Mulder
- Succeeded by: Seat abolished

Personal details
- Born: 25 June 1939 Sydney
- Died: 19 November 2019 (aged 80) Noosaville, Queensland
- Party: Liberal Party of Australia
- Spouse: Marilyn
- Children: Christopher, Kerrianne
- Education: Newington College
- Occupation: Accountant

John Arthur Abel (25 June 1939 – 19 November 2019) was an Australian politician. Born in Sydney, he attended Newington College from 1949 until 1954. Abel was an accountant and company manager before entering politics. In 1975, he was elected to the Australian House of Representatives as the Liberal member for Evans, defeating Labor MP Allan Mulder. His seat was abolished in a redistribution before the 1977 election, and he unsuccessfully challenged former prime minister William McMahon for preselection in the Division of Lowe. In 1996 he returned to serve the Parliament as Senior Adviser and then Chief of Staff to the Minister for Roads, Territories and Local Government (Member for Robertson). Affectionately known by many colleagues on the NSW Central Coast as "Sir John". In 2008 Abel retired from politics. In 2009 he moved with his wife and family to the Sunshine Coast in Queensland. John Abel died in 2019.

Parliament of Australia
| Preceded by Allan Mulder | Member for Evans; 1975–1977 | Succeeded by Seat abolished |
