= Electoral results for the Division of Parramatta =

Australian division election results

This is a list of electoral results for the Division of Parramatta in Australian federal elections from the division's creation in 1901 until the present.

== Members ==
Member	Party	Term
(Sir) Joseph Cook	Free Trade, Anti-Socialist	1901–1909
(Sir) Joseph Cook	Liberal	1909–1916
(Sir) Joseph Cook	Nationalist	1916–1921
Herbert Pratten	Nationalist	1921–1922
Eric Bowden	Nationalist	1922–1929
Albert Rowe	Labor	1929–1931
(Sir) Frederick Stewart	United Australia	1931–1946
Howard Beale	Liberal	1946–1958
Sir Garfield Barwick	Liberal	1958–1964
Nigel Bowen	Liberal	1964–1973
Philip Ruddock	Liberal	1973–1977
John Brown	Labor	1977–1990
Paul Elliott	Labor	1990–1996
Ross Cameron	Liberal	1996–2004
Julie Owens	Labor	2004–2022
Andrew Charlton	Labor	2022-present

== Election results ==
=== Elections in the 2020s ===
==== 2025 ====
2025 Australian federal election: Parramatta
Party	Candidate	Votes	%	±%
Labor	Andrew Charlton	46,427	47.77	+7.63
Liberal	Katie Mullens	29,860	30.72	−6.10
Greens	Liz Tilly	11,766	12.11	+2.56
One Nation	Nicholas Matzen	2,653	2.73	+0.47
Trumpet of Patriots	Ganesh Loke	2,445	2.52	+2.51
Libertarian	Ben Somerson	1,522	1.57	−0.14
Independent	Tanya-lee Quinn	1,499	1.54	+1.54
Independent	Maa Malini	1,018	1.05	+1.05
Total formal votes		97,190	91.05	−1.20
Informal votes		9,556	8.95	+1.20
Turnout		106,746	90.85	+4.35
Two-party-preferred result
Labor	Andrew Charlton	60,790	62.55	+8.83
Liberal	Katie Mullens	36,400	37.45	−8.83
Labor hold		Swing	+8.83	

==== 2022 ====
2022 Australian federal election: Parramatta
Party	Candidate	Votes	%	±%
Labor	Andrew Charlton	34,258	40.66	−4.42
Liberal	Maria Kovacic	29,492	35.00	−6.28
Greens	Phil Bradley	7,546	8.96	+1.72
United Australia	Julian Fayad	4,269	5.07	+2.49
Independent OLC	Steve Christou	2,982	3.54	+3.54
Animal Justice	Rohan Laxmanalal	2,397	2.84	+2.84
One Nation	Heather Freeman	2,011	2.39	+2.39
Liberal Democrats	Liza Tazewell	1,310	1.55	+1.55
Total formal votes		84,265	91.07	−0.56
Informal votes		8,259	8.93	+0.56
Turnout		92,524	87.73	−1.88
Two-party-preferred result
Labor	Andrew Charlton	45,980	54.57	+1.07
Liberal	Maria Kovacic	38,285	45.43	−1.07
Labor hold		Swing	+1.07	

Alluvial diagram for preference flows in the seat of Parramatta in the 2022 federal election. indicates at what stage the winning candidate had over 50% of the votes and was declared the winner.

=== Elections in the 2010s ===
==== 2019 ====
2019 Australian federal election: Parramatta
Party	Candidate	Votes	%	±%
Labor	Julie Owens	38,171	45.08	−1.38
Liberal	Charles Camenzuli	34,954	41.28	+6.91
Greens	Phil Bradley	6,131	7.24	+0.36
Christian Democrats	Asma Payara	2,526	2.98	−2.32
United Australia	Ganesh Loke	2,186	2.58	+2.58
Socialist Equality	Oscar Grenfell	702	0.83	+0.83
Total formal votes		84,670	91.63	+0.89
Informal votes		7,739	8.37	−0.89
Turnout		92,409	89.61	+0.59
Two-party-preferred result
Labor	Julie Owens	45,302	53.50	−4.17
Liberal	Charles Camenzuli	39,368	46.50	+4.17
Labor hold		Swing	−4.17	

==== 2016 ====
2016 Australian federal election: Parramatta
Party	Candidate	Votes	%	±%
Labor	Julie Owens	38,109	46.46	+4.31
Liberal	Michael Beckwith	28,194	34.37	−9.15
Greens	Phil Bradley	5,640	6.88	+1.67
Christian Democrats	Keith Piper	4,347	5.30	+2.83
Independent	Mahesh Raj	2,048	2.50	+2.50
Liberal Democrats	Mark Guest	2,013	2.45	+2.45
Family First	Mikaela Wu	1,202	1.47	+1.47
Online Direct Democracy	Andrew Driessen	469	0.57	+0.57
Total formal votes		82,022	90.74	+1.19
Informal votes		8,367	9.26	−1.19
Turnout		90,389	89.02	−3.55
Two-party-preferred result
Labor	Julie Owens	47,300	57.67	+6.35
Liberal	Michael Beckwith	34,722	42.33	−6.35
Labor hold		Swing	+6.35	

==== 2013 ====
2013 Australian federal election: Parramatta
Party	Candidate	Votes	%	±%
Liberal	Martin Zaiter	35,724	44.31	+3.59
Labor	Julie Owens	33,261	41.26	−3.20
Greens	Phil Bradley	4,261	5.29	−2.67
Christian Democrats	Alex Sharah	1,957	2.43	−0.64
Palmer United	Ganesh Loke	1,760	2.18	+2.18
Democratic Labour	Miechele Williams	1,626	2.02	+2.02
Independent	Kalpesh Patel	1,204	1.49	−0.34
One Nation	Tania Rollinson	822	1.02	+1.02
Total formal votes		80,615	89.48	−1.87
Informal votes		9,474	10.52	+1.87
Turnout		90,089	91.40	+0.19
Two-party-preferred result
Labor	Julie Owens	40,765	50.57	−3.80
Liberal	Martin Zaiter	39,850	49.43	+3.80
Labor hold		Swing	−3.80	

==== 2010 ====
2010 Australian federal election: Parramatta
Party	Candidate	Votes	%	±%
Labor	Julie Owens	34,818	44.46	−8.94
Liberal	Charles Camenzuli	31,889	40.72	+6.14
Greens	Phil Bradley	6,237	7.96	+2.66
Christian Democrats	Alex Sharah	2,404	3.07	−0.22
Independent	Kalpesh Patel	1,436	1.83	+1.83
Socialist Equality	Chris Gordon	1,203	1.54	+1.38
Socialist Alliance	Duncan Roden	330	0.42	−0.14
Total formal votes		78,317	91.35	−2.03
Informal votes		7,418	8.65	+2.03
Turnout		85,735	91.19	−1.40
Two-party-preferred result
Labor	Julie Owens	42,583	54.37	−5.49
Liberal	Charles Camenzuli	35,734	45.63	+5.49
Labor hold		Swing	−5.49	

=== Elections in the 2000s ===
==== 2007 ====
2007 Australian federal election: Parramatta
Party	Candidate	Votes	%	±%
Labor	Julie Owens	43,083	50.58	+10.68
Liberal	Colin Robinson	32,155	37.75	−7.39
Greens	Astrid O'Neill	4,288	5.03	+0.16
Christian Democrats	Sam Baissari	2,403	2.82	+0.00
Socialist Alliance	Rachel Evans	1,015	1.19	+1.19
Family First	Rene Hernandez	888	1.04	+0.09
Independent	Brian Buckley	639	0.75	+0.75
Liberty & Democracy	Graham Nickols	274	0.32	+0.32
Socialist Equality	Chris Gordon	261	0.31	+0.31
Communist League	Alasdair Macdonald	174	0.20	+0.20
Total formal votes		85,180	93.44	+2.69
Informal votes		5,981	6.56	−2.69
Turnout		91,161	94.75	−0.06
Two-party-preferred result
Labor	Julie Owens	48,453	56.88	+7.71
Liberal	Colin Robinson	36,727	43.12	−7.71
Labor notional gain from Liberal		Swing	+7.71	

The sitting member was Julie Owens (Labor) however a redistribution made it a notional Liberal seat with a margin of 1.1%.

==== 2004 ====
2004 Australian federal election: Parramatta
Party	Candidate	Votes	%	±%
Liberal	Ross Cameron	33,073	44.09	−1.85
Labor	Julie Owens	31,166	41.55	+0.14
Greens	Doug Williamson	3,973	5.30	+2.21
Christian Democrats	Sam Baissari	1,948	2.60	+1.07
Liberals for Forests	Mark Antony Guest	985	1.31	+1.31
One Nation	John Satchwell	859	1.15	−1.81
Democrats	Rob McFarlane	798	1.06	−2.35
Non-Custodial Parents	Alex Peniazev	777	1.04	+0.85
Family First	Andrew Markwell	674	0.90	+0.90
No GST	Simon Saad	581	0.77	+0.77
Save the ADI Site	Margaret Bloor	175	0.23	+0.23
Total formal votes		75,009	91.47	−2.32
Informal votes		6,996	8.53	+2.32
Turnout		82,005	94.13	+0.12
Two-party-preferred result
Labor	Julie Owens	38,083	50.77	+1.92
Liberal	Ross Cameron	36,926	49.23	−1.92
Labor gain from Liberal		Swing	+1.92	

==== 2001 ====
2001 Australian federal election: Parramatta
Party	Candidate	Votes	%	±%
Liberal	Ross Cameron	35,356	45.94	+5.59
Labor	David Borger	31,867	41.41	−0.34
Democrats	Anthony Clark	2,622	3.41	+0.50
Greens	Felicity George	2,380	3.09	+1.35
One Nation	John Satchwell	2,279	2.96	−3.38
Christian Democrats	Dee Jonsson	1,177	1.53	−0.05
Unity	Somchai Tongsumrith	1,131	1.47	−2.73
Non-Custodial Parents	Will Watson	148	0.19	+0.19
Total formal votes		76,960	93.79	−1.03
Informal votes		5,098	6.21	+1.03
Turnout		82,058	94.47	
Two-party-preferred result
Liberal	Ross Cameron	39,367	51.15	+3.64
Labor	David Borger	37,593	48.85	−3.64
Liberal notional gain from Labor		Swing	+3.64	

=== Elections in the 1990s ===
==== 1998 ====
1998 Australian federal election: Parramatta
Party	Candidate	Votes	%	±%
Liberal	Ross Cameron	31,060	43.64	−4.01
Labor	Paul Elliott	27,521	38.67	−0.76
One Nation	Ian Hale	4,495	6.32	+6.32
Unity	Matthew Wong	3,073	4.32	+4.32
Democrats	Peter Mulligan	2,033	2.86	−2.58
Greens	Peter Wright	1,195	1.68	+1.68
Christian Democrats	Dee Jonsson	899	1.26	−0.22
Independent	Tina Schembri	707	0.99	+0.99
Natural Law	John Cogger	108	0.15	−0.92
Republican	Peter Consandine	79	0.11	+0.11
Total formal votes		71,170	95.19	−0.96
Informal votes		3,600	4.81	+0.96
Turnout		74,770	94.89	−1.51
Two-party-preferred result
Liberal	Ross Cameron	36,346	51.07	−2.80
Labor	Paul Elliott	34,824	48.93	+2.80
Liberal hold		Swing	−2.80	

==== 1996 ====
1996 Australian federal election: Parramatta
Party	Candidate	Votes	%	±%
Liberal	Ross Cameron	34,310	47.65	+5.45
Labor	Paul Elliott	28,390	39.43	−9.81
Democrats	Eduardo Avila	3,912	5.43	+2.13
AAFI	Peter Krumins	2,005	2.78	+2.78
Independent	Heidi Scott	1,103	1.53	+1.53
Call to Australia	Dee Jonsson	1,066	1.48	+0.04
Natural Law	John Cogger	755	1.08	+0.48
Independent	Joseph Chidiac	440	0.61	+0.61
Total formal votes		72,001	96.14	−0.95
Informal votes		2,887	3.86	+0.95
Turnout		74,888	96.39	+0.32
Two-party-preferred result
Liberal	Ross Cameron	38,671	53.87	+7.11
Labor	Paul Elliott	33,115	46.13	−7.11
Liberal gain from Labor		Swing	+7.11	

==== 1993 ====
1993 Australian federal election: Parramatta
Party	Candidate	Votes	%	±%
Labor	Paul Elliott	35,793	49.24	+7.44
Liberal	Max Rawnsley	30,681	42.21	−0.76
Democrats	Bill Rosier	2,399	3.30	−8.23
Independent	Sam Papadopoulos	1,887	2.60	+2.60
Call to Australia	John Shields	1,044	1.44	+1.44
Confederate Action	John Wilson	458	0.63	+0.63
Natural Law	Rodney Forshaw	431	0.59	+0.59
Total formal votes		72,693	97.09	+0.14
Informal votes		2,177	2.91	−0.14
Turnout		74,870	96.07	
Two-party-preferred result
Labor	Paul Elliott	38,673	53.24	+2.46
Liberal	Max Rawnsley	33,966	46.76	−2.46
Labor hold		Swing	+2.46	

==== 1990 ====
1990 Australian federal election: Parramatta
Party	Candidate	Votes	%	±%
Labor	Paul Elliott	30,575	49.6	−2.9
Liberal	Ross Barwick	22,884	37.2	−1.6
Democrats	Michael Antrum	7,119	11.6	+2.9
Democratic Socialist	Kerry Vernon	1,016	1.6	+1.6
Total formal votes		61,594	96.5	
Informal votes		2,240	3.5	
Turnout		63,834	95.0	
Two-party-preferred result
Labor	Paul Elliott	35,865	58.3	+2.0
Liberal	Ross Barwick	25,603	41.7	−2.0
Labor hold		Swing	+2.0	

=== Elections in the 1980s ===
==== 1987 ====
1987 Australian federal election: Parramatta
Party	Candidate	Votes	%	±%
Labor	John Brown	32,304	52.5	−5.5
Liberal	Paul Hamer	23,881	38.8	+3.8
Democrats	Rodney Levett	5,378	8.7	+1.7
Total formal votes		61,563	94.3	
Informal votes		3,727	5.7	
Turnout		65,290	94.2	
Two-party-preferred result
Labor	John Brown	34,649	56.3	−5.4
Liberal	Paul Hamer	26,914	43.7	+5.4
Labor hold		Swing	−5.4	

==== 1984 ====
1984 Australian federal election: Parramatta
Party	Candidate	Votes	%	±%
Labor	John Brown	35,077	58.0	+1.5
Liberal	Charles Stanley	21,176	35.0	−1.3
Democrats	John Butterworth	4,256	7.0	+2.0
Total formal votes		60,509	92.6	
Informal votes		4,819	7.4	
Turnout		65,328	93.4	
Two-party-preferred result
Labor	John Brown	37,307	61.7	+0.2
Liberal	Charles Stanley	23,201	38.3	−0.2
Labor hold		Swing	+0.2	

==== 1983 ====
1983 Australian federal election: Parramatta
Party	Candidate	Votes	%	±%
Labor	John Brown	41,951	62.2	+8.2
Liberal	James Harker-Mortlock	20,608	30.6	−4.2
Democrats	Patricia Lamey	3,361	5.0	−4.3
Socialist Workers	Mark Carey	1,519	2.2	+2.2
Total formal votes		67,439	97.1	
Informal votes		2,025	2.9	
Turnout		69,464	93.9	
Two-party-preferred result
Labor	John Brown		67.2	+7.0
Liberal	James Harker-Mortlock		32.8	−7.0
Labor hold		Swing	+7.0	

==== 1980 ====
1980 Australian federal election: Parramatta
Party	Candidate	Votes	%	±%
Labor	John Brown	35,810	54.0	+2.0
Liberal	Lance Shaw	23,058	34.8	−5.0
Democrats	Warwick Barber	6,191	9.3	+1.1
Independent	Jim Saleam	1,248	1.9	+1.9
Total formal votes		66,307	96.5	
Informal votes		2,410	3.5	
Turnout		68,717	94.2	
Two-party-preferred result
Labor	John Brown		60.2	+4.1
Liberal	Lance Shaw		39.8	−4.1
Labor hold		Swing	+4.1	

=== Elections in the 1970s ===
==== 1977 ====
1977 Australian federal election: Parramatta
Party	Candidate	Votes	%	±%
Labor	John Brown	34,405	52.0	−0.1
Liberal	Douglas Cox	26,315	39.8	−5.2
Democrats	Peter Lukunic	5,397	8.2	+8.2
Total formal votes		66,117	97.0	
Informal votes		2,062	3.0	
Turnout		68,179	95.3	
Two-party-preferred result
Labor	John Brown		56.1	+3.6
Liberal	Douglas Cox		43.9	−3.6
Labor notional hold		Swing	+3.6	

==== 1975 ====
1975 Australian federal election: Parramatta
Party	Candidate	Votes	%	±%
Liberal	Philip Ruddock	40,761	56.7	+7.4
Labor	John Brown	29,055	40.4	−6.4
Workers	Malcolm McKinnon	1,307	1.8	+1.8
Australia	Astrid O'Neill	801	1.1	−1.1
Total formal votes		71,924	98.6	
Informal votes		994	1.4	
Turnout		72,918	95.9	
Two-party-preferred result
Liberal	Philip Ruddock		59.2	+7.9
Labor	John Brown		40.8	−7.9
Liberal hold		Swing	+7.9	

==== 1974 ====
1974 Australian federal election: Parramatta
Party	Candidate	Votes	%	±%
Liberal	Philip Ruddock	33,916	49.3	+3.3
Labor	Barry Wilde	32,246	46.8	+0.8
Australia	Robert MacKenzie	1,481	2.2	−1.3
Independent	Derek Barker	1,188	1.7	−0.1
Total formal votes		68,831	98.4	
Informal votes		1,101	1.6	
Turnout		69,932	96.0	
Two-party-preferred result
Liberal	Philip Ruddock	35,330	51.3	+1.0
Labor	Barry Wilde	33,501	48.7	−1.0
Liberal hold		Swing	+1.0	

==== 1973 by-election ====
1973 Parramatta by-election
Party	Candidate	Votes	%	±%
Liberal	Philip Ruddock	33,506	52.6	+6.6
Labor	Michael Whelan	24,623	38.7	−7.3
Australia	John Butterworth	3,522	5.5	+2.0
Independent	Marilyn Pye	575	0.9	+0.9
Defence of Government Schools	Michael Hourihan	528	0.8	+0.8
Independent	Marcus Aussie-Stone	363	0.6	+0.6
Independent	Sidney McGarrity	325	0.5	+0.5
Independent	Gwenda Lister	65	0.1	+0.1
Independent	Charles Bellchambers	53	0.1	+0.1
National Socialist	Ross May	37	0.1	+0.1
Independent	Leonard Kiernan	30	0.0	+0.0
Independent	Kevin Meares	25	0.0	+0.0
Total formal votes		63,652	97.7	
Informal votes		1,493	2.3	
Turnout		65,145	88.4	
Two-party-preferred result
Liberal	Philip Ruddock		57.3	+7.0
Labor	Michael Whelan		42.7	−7.0
Liberal hold		Swing	+7.0	

==== 1972 ====
1972 Australian federal election: Parramatta
Party	Candidate	Votes	%	±%
Liberal	Nigel Bowen	28,463	46.0	−1.0
Labor	Michael Whelan	28,458	46.0	+1.4
Australia	James Mulheron	2,144	3.5	+3.5
Democratic Labor	Doris Brauer	1,509	2.4	−1.9
Defence of Government Schools	Derek Barker	1,120	1.8	+1.8
Independent	Graham Courtney	191	0.3	+0.3
Total formal votes		61,885	97.8	
Informal votes		1,397	2.2	
Turnout		63,282	95.7	
Two-party-preferred result
Liberal	Nigel Bowen	31,122	50.3	−2.4
Labor	Michael Whelan	30,763	49.7	+2.4
Liberal hold		Swing	−2.4	

=== Elections in the 1960s ===
==== 1969 ====
1969 Australian federal election: Parramatta
Party	Candidate	Votes	%	±%
Liberal	Nigel Bowen	27,131	47.0	−10.0
Labor	Barry Wilde	25,732	44.6	+13.0
Democratic Labor	Hans Andreasson	2,508	4.3	−0.8
Independent	John Keeffe	2,066	3.6	+3.6
Independent	Leonard Kiernan	240	0.4	+0.4
Total formal votes		57,677	98.1	
Informal votes		1,144	1.9	
Turnout		58,821	94.7	
Two-party-preferred result
Liberal	Nigel Bowen	30,374	52.7	−9.9
Labor	Barry Wilde	27,303	47.3	+9.9
Liberal hold		Swing	−9.9	

==== 1966 ====
1966 Australian federal election: Parramatta
Party	Candidate	Votes	%	±%
Liberal	Nigel Bowen	33,087	56.8	+0.8
Labor	Barry Wilde	18,518	31.8	−6.7
Liberal Reform Group	Kenneth Cook	3,380	5.8	+5.8
Democratic Labor	Edward Beck	2,982	5.1	−0.4
Independent	Paul Nolan	322	0.6	+0.6
Total formal votes		58,289	97.1	
Informal votes		1,741	2.9	
Turnout		60,030	94.1	
Two-party-preferred result
Liberal	Nigel Bowen		62.8	+2.4
Labor	Barry Wilde		37.2	−2.4
Liberal hold		Swing	+2.4	

==== 1964 by-election ====
1964 Parramatta by-election
Party	Candidate	Votes	%	±%
Liberal	Nigel Bowen	26,506	52.1	−3.9
Labor	Barry Wilde	21,227	41.8	+3.3
Democratic Labor	Edward Beck	2,701	5.3	−0.2
Independent	Augustus Fenwick	248	0.5	+0.5
Independent	John Phillips	152	0.3	+0.3
Total formal votes		50,834	98.1	
Informal votes		975	1.9	
Turnout		51,809	87.6	
Two-party-preferred result
Liberal	Nigel Bowen		56.9	−3.5
Labor	Barry Wilde		43.1	+3.5
Liberal hold		Swing	−3.5	

==== 1963 ====
1963 Australian federal election: Parramatta
Party	Candidate	Votes	%	±%
Liberal	Sir Garfield Barwick	31,660	56.0	+5.9
Labor	Maxwell McLaren	21,791	38.5	−4.3
Democratic Labor	Edward Beck	3,088	5.5	−0.1
Total formal votes		56,539	98.9	
Informal votes		602	1.1	
Turnout		57,141	95.7	
Two-party-preferred result
Liberal	Sir Garfield Barwick		60.4	+5.4
Labor	Maxwell McLaren		39.6	−5.4
Liberal hold		Swing	+5.4	

==== 1961 ====
1961 Australian federal election: Parramatta
Party	Candidate	Votes	%	±%
Liberal	Sir Garfield Barwick	26,200	50.1	−6.7
Labor	Maxwell McLaren	22,401	42.8	+3.1
Democratic Labor	Reginald Andrews	2,936	5.6	+2.1
Communist	Matt Munro	771	1.5	+1.5
Total formal votes		52,308	97.7	
Informal votes		1,256	2.3	
Turnout		53,564	95.5	
Two-party-preferred result
Liberal	Sir Garfield Barwick		55.0	−4.6
Labor	Maxwell McLaren		45.0	+4.6
Liberal hold		Swing	−4.6	

=== Elections in the 1950s ===
==== 1958 ====
1958 Australian federal election: Parramatta
Party	Candidate	Votes	%	±%
Liberal	Sir Garfield Barwick	27,344	56.8	−5.5
Labor	Ray Jones	19,141	39.7	+2.0
Democratic Labor	William Kildea	1,693	3.5	+3.5
Total formal votes		48,178	97.7	
Informal votes		1,156	2.3	
Turnout		49,334	96.4	
Two-party-preferred result
Liberal	Sir Garfield Barwick		59.6	−2.7
Labor	Ray Jones		40.4	+2.7
Liberal hold		Swing	−2.7	

==== 1958 by-election ====
1958 Parramatta by-election
Party	Candidate	Votes	%	±%
Liberal	Sir Garfield Barwick	22,826	54.8	−7.5
Labor	Dan Mahoney	17,931	43.0	+5.3
Independent	Augustus Fenwick	920	2.2	+2.2
Total formal votes		41,677	98.6	
Informal votes		610	1.4	
Turnout		42,287	86.9	
Two-party-preferred result
Liberal	Sir Garfield Barwick		55.9	−6.4
Labor	Dan Mahoney		44.1	+6.4
Liberal hold		Swing	−6.4	

==== 1955 ====
1955 Australian federal election: Parramatta
Party	Candidate	Votes	%	±%
Liberal	Howard Beale	25,854	62.3	+1.6
Labor	John Heazlewood	15,631	37.7	−1.6
Total formal votes		41,485	97.3	
Informal votes		1,137	2.7	
Turnout		42,622	95.8	
Liberal hold		Swing	+1.6	

==== 1954 ====
1954 Australian federal election: Parramatta
Party	Candidate	Votes	%	±%
Liberal	Howard Beale	27,941	59.8	−3.7
Labor	John Holmes	18,760	40.2	+3.7
Total formal votes		46,701	98.9	
Informal votes		500	1.1	
Turnout		47,201	95.8	
Liberal hold		Swing	−3.7	

==== 1951 ====
1951 Australian federal election: Parramatta
Party	Candidate	Votes	%	±%
Liberal	Howard Beale	26,852	63.5	+0.9
Labor	John Holmes	15,422	36.5	−0.9
Total formal votes		42,274	98.0	
Informal votes		855	2.0	
Turnout		43,129	96.2	
Liberal hold		Swing	+0.9	

=== Elections in the 1940s ===
==== 1949 ====
1949 Australian federal election: Parramatta
Party	Candidate	Votes	%	±%
Liberal	Howard Beale	25,411	62.6	+7.2
Labor	Clement Jackson	15,211	37.4	−7.2
Total formal votes		40,622	98.2	
Informal votes		756	1.8	
Turnout		41,378	96.7	
Liberal hold		Swing	+7.2	

==== 1946 ====
1946 Australian federal election: Parramatta
Party	Candidate	Votes	%	±%
Liberal	Howard Beale	43,070	60.1	+21.8
Labor	Dudley Jeffree	28,645	39.9	+2.5
Total formal votes		71,715	98.1	
Informal votes		1,417	1.9	
Turnout		73,132	95.0	
Liberal hold		Swing	+0.8	

==== 1943 ====
1943 Australian federal election: Parramatta
Party	Candidate	Votes	%	±%
United Australia	Sir Frederick Stewart	25,267	38.3	−26.8
Labor	Arthur Treble	24,680	37.4	+19.9
Liberal Democratic	Ormond Bissett	8,884	13.5	+13.5
National Unity	Robert Firebrace	5,806	8.8	+8.8
Independent	Dexter Moore	1,069	1.6	+1.6
Ind. United Australia	Howard Miscamble	336	0.5	+0.5
Total formal votes		66,042	96.9	
Informal votes		2,110	3.1	
Turnout		68,152	96.7	
Two-party-preferred result
United Australia	Sir Frederick Stewart	39,150	59.3	−6.4
Labor	Arthur Treble	26,892	40.7	+6.4
United Australia hold		Swing	−6.4	

==== 1940 ====
1940 Australian federal election: Parramatta
Party	Candidate	Votes	%	±%
United Australia	Sir Frederick Stewart	25,561	42.4	−25.5
Labor	Albert Rowe	10,553	17.5	−8.9
United Australia	Gordon Wallace	7,437	12.3	+12.3
United Australia	Norman Rydge	7,189	11.9	+11.9
Labor (N-C)	James Dalton	5,639	9.3	+9.3
State Labor	Bill Wood	3,952	6.6	+6.6
Total formal votes		60,331	97.1	
Informal votes		1,822	2.9	
Turnout		62,153	95.7	
Two-party-preferred result
United Australia	Sir Frederick Stewart	39,624	65.7	−4.1
Labor	Albert Rowe	20,707	34.3	+4.1
United Australia hold		Swing	−4.1	

=== Elections in the 1930s ===
==== 1937 ====
1937 Australian federal election: Parramatta
Party	Candidate	Votes	%	±%
United Australia	Sir Frederick Stewart	37,972	67.9	+2.8
Labor	Albert Rowe	14,747	26.4	+22.4
Independent	Dick George	2,118	3.8	+3.8
Independent	Harold Meggitt	1,100	2.0	+2.0
Total formal votes		55,937	97.4	
Informal votes		1,504	2.6	
Turnout		57,441	96.4	
Two-party-preferred result
United Australia	Sir Frederick Stewart		69.8	+0.4
Labor	Albert Rowe		30.2	+30.2
United Australia hold		Swing	+0.4	

==== 1934 ====
1934 Australian federal election: Parramatta
Party	Candidate	Votes	%	±%
United Australia	Frederick Stewart	33,779	65.1	−3.5
Labor (NSW)	John Garvan	12,722	24.5	+9.2
Social Credit	Howard Miscamble	3,357	6.5	+6.5
Labor	John Keegan	2,057	4.0	−10.8
Total formal votes		51,915	97.3	
Informal votes		1,438	2.7	
Turnout		53,353	95.9	
Two-party-preferred result
United Australia	Frederick Stewart		69.4	−3.0
Labor (NSW)	John Garvan		30.6	+3.0
United Australia hold		Swing	−3.0	

==== 1931 ====
1931 Australian federal election: Parramatta
Party	Candidate	Votes	%	±%
United Australia	Frederick Stewart	39,620	62.0	+15.3
Labor (NSW)	Valentine Patterson	13,727	21.5	+21.5
Labor	Albert Rowe	9,456	14.8	−38.5
Independent	Anwoth Brown	1,143	1.8	+1.8
Total formal votes		63,937	96.5	
Informal votes		2,313	3.5	
Turnout		66,250	95.0	
Two-party-preferred result
United Australia	Frederick Stewart		66.2	+19.5
Labor (NSW)	Valentine Patterson		33.8	+33.8
United Australia gain from Labor		Swing	+19.5	

=== Elections in the 1920s ===
==== 1929 ====
1929 Australian federal election: Parramatta
Party	Candidate	Votes	%	±%
Labor	Albert Rowe	30,686	53.3	+13.4
Nationalist	Eric Bowden	26,874	46.7	−13.4
Total formal votes		57,560	97.3	
Informal votes		1,582	2.7	
Turnout		59,142	95.0	
Labor gain from Nationalist		Swing	+13.4	

==== 1928 ====
1928 Australian federal election: Parramatta
Party	Candidate	Votes	%	±%
Nationalist	Eric Bowden	30,867	60.1	−5.6
Labor	Albert Rowe	20,492	39.9	+5.6
Total formal votes		51,359	94.8	
Informal votes		2,798	5.2	
Turnout		54,157	93.8	
Nationalist hold		Swing	−5.6	

==== 1925 ====
1925 Australian federal election: Parramatta
Party	Candidate	Votes	%	±%
Nationalist	Eric Bowden	30,309	65.7	+0.3
Labor	James Stone	15,809	34.3	−0.3
Total formal votes		46,118	98.1	
Informal votes		896	1.9	
Turnout		47,014	91.9	
Nationalist hold		Swing	+0.3	

==== 1922 ====
1922 Australian federal election: Parramatta
Party	Candidate	Votes	%	±%
Nationalist	Eric Bowden	12,793	65.4	+2.3
Labor	James Stone	6,776	34.6	−1.6
Total formal votes		19,569	95.9	
Informal votes		830	4.1	
Turnout		20,399	48.4	
Nationalist hold		Swing	−1.0	

==== 1921 by-election ====
1921 Parramatta by-election
Party	Candidate	Votes	%	±%
Nationalist	Herbert Pratten	20,768	66.0	−6.6
Labor	William Hutchison	5,625	17.9	−9.5
Independent	Albert Piddington	2,787	8.9	+8.9
Country	Barton Addison	2,268	7.2	+7.2
Total formal votes		31,448	98.8	
Informal votes		859	1.2	
Turnout		32,307		
Two-party-preferred result
Nationalist	Herbert Pratten		76.0	+3.4
Labor	William Hutchison		26.0	−3.4
Nationalist hold		Swing	+3.4	

=== Elections in the 1910s ===
==== 1919 ====
1919 Australian federal election: Parramatta
Party	Candidate	Votes	%	±%
Nationalist	Sir Joseph Cook	27,000	72.6	−1.2
Labor	William Hutchinson	10,205	27.4	+27.4
Total formal votes		37,205	98.6	
Informal votes		536	1.4	
Turnout		37,741	66.2	
Nationalist hold		Swing	−1.2	

==== 1917 ====
1917 Australian federal election: Parramatta
Party	Candidate	Votes	%	±%
Nationalist	Joseph Cook	26,869	73.8	−26.2
Independent	Alfred Conroy	9,551	26.2	+26.2
Total formal votes		36,420	95.8	
Informal votes		1,585	4.2	
Turnout		38,005	70.9	
Nationalist hold		Swing	−26.2	

==== 1914 ====
1914 Australian federal election: Parramatta
Party	Candidate	Votes	%	±%
Liberal	Joseph Cook	unopposed		
Liberal hold		Swing		

==== 1913 ====
1913 Australian federal election: Parramatta
Party	Candidate	Votes	%	±%
Liberal	Joseph Cook	20,727	68.3	+4.2
Labor	Oscar Zieman	9,603	31.7	−3.9
Total formal votes		30,330	96.1	
Informal votes		1,227	3.9	
Turnout		31,557	74.4	
Liberal hold		Swing	+4.0	

==== 1910 ====
1910 Australian federal election: Parramatta
Party	Candidate	Votes	%	±%
Liberal	Joseph Cook	11,881	68.0	−32.0
Labour	Bert Broue	5,579	32.0	+32.0
Total formal votes		17,460	98.0	
Informal votes		359	2.0	
Turnout		17,819	54.5	
Liberal hold		Swing	−32.0	

=== Elections in the 1900s ===
==== 1906 ====
1906 Australian federal election: Parramatta
Party	Candidate	Votes	%	±%
Anti-Socialist	Joseph Cook	unopposed		
Anti-Socialist hold		Swing		

==== 1903 ====
1903 Australian federal election: Parramatta
Party	Candidate	Votes	%	±%
Free Trade	Joseph Cook	10,097	80.1	+18.8
Ind. Protectionist	John Strachan	2,506	19.9	+19.9
Total formal votes		12,603	95.4	
Informal votes		612	4.6	
Turnout		13,215	47.1	
Free Trade hold		Swing	+18.8	

==== 1901 ====
1901 Australian federal election: Parramatta
Party	Candidate	Votes	%	±%
Free Trade	Joseph Cook	5,778	61.3	+61.3
Protectionist	William Sandford	3,646	38.7	+38.7
Total formal votes		9,424	99.0	
Informal votes		91	1.0	
Turnout		9,515	74.6	
Free Trade win		(new seat)		
