= Electoral results for the Division of Nepean =

Election results for federal seat of Nepean, New South Wales, Australia

This is a list of electoral results for the Division of Nepean in Australian federal elections from the division's creation in 1906 until its abolition in 1922.

== Members ==
Member	Party	Term
Eric Bowden	Anti-Socialist	1906—1909
Eric Bowden	Liberal	1909—1910
George Cann	Labor	1910—1913
Richard Orchard	Liberal	1913—1916
Richard Orchard	Nationalist	1916—1919
Eric Bowden	Nationalist	1919—1922

== Election results ==
=== Elections in the 1910s ===
==== 1919 ====
1919 Australian federal election: Nepean
Party	Candidate	Votes	%	±%
Nationalist	Eric Bowden	20,630	57.1	−3.4
Labor	Con Wallace	15,524	42.9	+3.4
Total formal votes		36,154	97.8	
Informal votes		814	2.2	
Turnout		36,968	68.6	
Nationalist hold		Swing	−3.4	

==== 1917 ====
1917 Australian federal election: Nepean
Party	Candidate	Votes	%	±%
Nationalist	Richard Orchard	22,402	60.5	+7.8
Labor	Tom Arthur	14,600	39.5	−7.8
Total formal votes		37,002	97.3	
Informal votes		1,034	2.7	
Turnout		38,036	72.8	
Nationalist hold		Swing	+7.8	

==== 1914 ====
1914 Australian federal election: Nepean
Party	Candidate	Votes	%	±%
Liberal	Richard Orchard	16,815	52.7	−1.5
Labor	Voltaire Molesworth	15,092	47.3	+4.3
Total formal votes		31,907	97.7	
Informal votes		747	2.3	
Turnout		32,654	69.2	
Liberal hold		Swing	−2.9	

==== 1913 ====
1913 Australian federal election: Nepean
Party	Candidate	Votes	%	±%
Liberal	Richard Orchard	16,322	54.2	−4.7
Labor	George Cann	12,947	43.0	+2.0
Independent	Alexander Huie	835	2.8	+2.8
Total formal votes		30,104	96.7	
Informal votes		1,015	3.3	
Turnout		31,119	72.6	
Liberal hold		Swing	−3.3	

==== 1910 ====
1910 Australian federal election: Nepean
Party	Candidate	Votes	%	±%
Labour	George Cann	11,113	51.5	+17.5
Liberal	Eric Bowden	10,461	48.5	−12.1
Total formal votes		21,574	98.3	
Informal votes		376	1.7	
Turnout		21,950	62.3	
Labour gain from Liberal		Swing	+14.8	

=== Elections in the 1900s ===
==== 1906 ====
1906 Australian federal election: Nepean
Party	Candidate	Votes	%	±%
Anti-Socialist	Eric Bowden	9,749	60.6	
Labour	Charles Dyer	5,471	34.0	
Ind. Anti-Socialist	Thomas Taylor	857	5.3	
Total formal votes		16,077	96.0	
Informal votes		677	4.0	
Turnout		16,754	56.4	
Anti-Socialist notional hold		Swing		
