= Endrim =

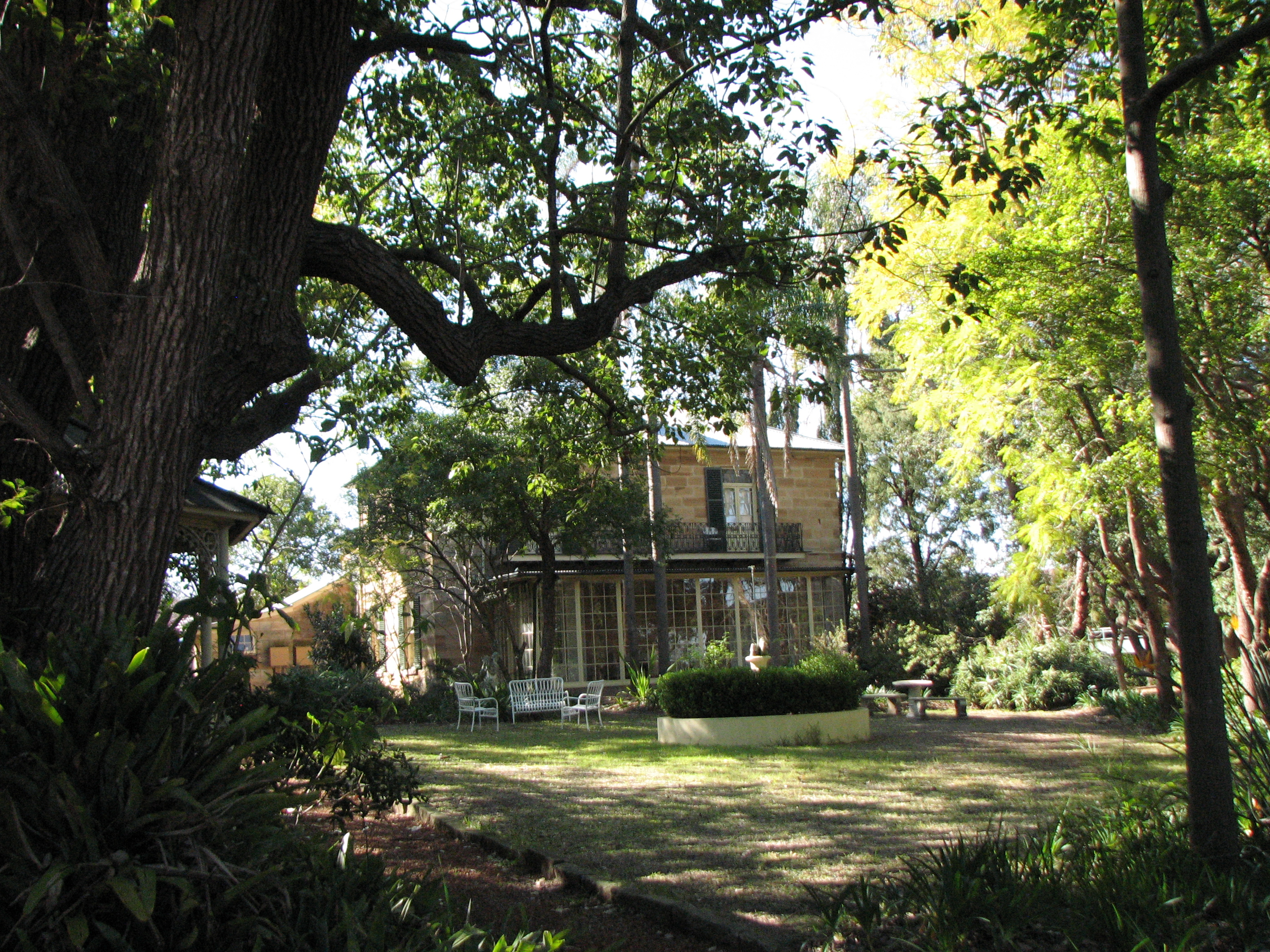
- Endrim, 54 Sorrell Street, Parramatta.

- Location within Sydney Location within Australia
- 33.8045°S 151.0082°E
- Location: 54 Sorrell Street, Parramatta, Sydney, New South Wales, Australia

History
- Built: 1854–1856

Site notes
- Architect: James Houison

New South Wales Heritage Register
- Official name: Endrim
- Type: state heritage (complex / group)
- Designated: 2 April 1999
- Reference no.: 379
- Type: Presbytery/Rectory/ Vicarage/Manse
- Category: Religion
- Builders: James Houison and Nathaniel Payton

Endrim is a heritage-listed former residence and clergy house and now offices at 54 Sorrell Street, Parramatta, Sydney, New South Wales, Australia. It was designed by James Houison and built from 1854 to 1856 by James Houison and Nathaniel Payton. It was added to the New South Wales State Heritage Register on 2 April 1999.

== History ==
The site on which Endrim would be built is in Section 40 of the Town of Parramatta, which had been subdivided into regular allotments by this time and was formally proclaimed in 1893. Most of the block, an area of over two areas was officially granted to Reverend William F. Gore in November 1853. Gore had arrived in the colony in 1841 with his widowed mother and two elder brothers who became pastoralists in Queensland. William followed in the footsteps of his father who was a Protestant Irish clergyman. William completed his studies in Sydney and was ordained as an Anglican clergyman in 1844. He married in the same year and was appointed rector of All Saints Church, Parramatta, in 1849. He and his family rented a two-storey brick house which was near the Female Factory. He started planning his new house in 1852.

The foundation stone in Sorrell Street was laid in November 1854. The first storey was completed in June 1855 and his family moved into "Endrim" in APril 1856.

The house was built by local builder, James Houison, a Scottish carpenter who had arrived in Sydney in 1832 and soon earned a reputation as a skilled craftsman, in partnership with Nathaniel Payten. The partnership worked on the Parramatta Gaol and the Court House in the 1830s, then turned to churches in the 1840s and also completed a number of domestic projects including Endrim in this period.

Gore, who is attributed with planting a number of trees on the property, remained at All Saints until 1862, when he returned to England. He resigned his incumbency in 1867. The house was used as a rectory until (c. 1876) a new building was built (closer to the church, to the south) in 1876 and Endrim continued to be rented out as a residence until 1882 when it was conveyed to J. E. Bowden, a solicitor of Parramatta. The Bowden family was known in Parramatta and had long occupied the area.

A 1900 Photograph of Endrim's southern (side) facade shows the gravel drive sweeping by to the eastern (front) facade and front door, a large area of lawn, and a large "century plant" (Agave americana) in front of the house's southern facade, trees and shrubs. A bed of flowers and smaller shrubs is in the foreground. Taller trees and shrubs form a backdrop.

A Sydney Water Board plan dated 1894 and revised in 1912 shows the stone building, attached wings and detached stable building to its north. The building is located close to the Sorrell Street frontage and approximately mid-block. The wings extend toward Sorrell Street and to the north of the main building with a stair extending from the eastern facade, facing the large site. In 1902 the land was conveyed to Eric Bowden, second son of Ebenezer John Bowden and also a solicitor and politician. He was a federal MP for Nepean and later Parramatta in the 1920s.

Early plans and a photograph c. 1900 indicate that changes and additions were undertaken to the house between 1900 and 1912.

The Sands Directory indicates that the house continued to be occupied by various family members until its final listing in the 1930s.

E. K. (Eric) Bowden lost his seat in 1929 and his last years were shadowed by financial difficulties. The land was subdivided and an auction selling the residential sized allotments was held on site on 2 December 1927. He died in February 1931. Lot 6 of the subdivision had been transferred to his wife and daughters in 1928 and after his death the mortgagees continued to sell the various allotments.

Endrim was surrounded by gardens and a driveway also swept around the building. The house continued to occupy a large site, and area of over 1 acre made up of Lots 3-5 and part of Lot 2 of the subdivision. In 1934 this was bought by Millicent Lydia Bryant, wife of Harold Leslie Bryant, medical practitioner of Parramatta. The property was again transferred to Dale Building P/L in 1963 and in the same year to Horwood Investments P/L of Canberra. H. V. Horwood had been Mayor of Parramatta in 1954-5.

A Sydney Water Board plan dating from the c. 1930s shows the large site and house and that a number of detached houses, including a house on the corner allotment, Lot 1 (now 56 Sorrell Street) had been built on the subdivided allotments by this time.

In 1963 it would appear that the new owners of the site subdivided it again, creating a kinked line between lots 1 and 2, which were occupied by the stable and house respectively (now fronting Sorrell Street), and lots 3-5 which each had frontage to Harold Street.

The 1963 plan shows that a stone wall connected Endrim's main building and former stables to its north. The earlier plans also show that some change had been undertaken to the rear wings of the main building and a small wing had also been constructed to the northern facade.

In 1984, the property was sold to another solicitor, David Lewarne. Lewarne renovated the house and converted the ground floor as offices for his firm, Lewarne and Goldsmith. A kitchen was also provided on the upper level with permission from the Heritage Council of NSW, and converted for use as his residence. It would appear that the works from this period also included upgrade of the conservatories and overall building fabric and stonework, also addition of the boundary fence, plantings and garden elements including the brick steps and pathways around the eastern garden area.

In May 1985 a permanent conservation order was gazetted over Endrim, covering Lots 1-4.

The site today shows further alterations and additions have been undertaken. A later, high timber fence on brick base surrounds the site, with stone gate posts near the south-western corner of the site. The sweeping driveway and garden including a number of mature trees and plantings also generally remain with some later brick paths and landscape elements.

Some alterations and additions to the house and stables have occurred. The front facade has a stone porch over the entry which is not present in the c. 1900 photograph, and additions to the northern and southern sides of the main house. However the buildings retain a strong sense of their earlier character and face stone facades and details.

Lewarne died in 2010, and his firm vacated the building in 2012, following which it was sold. In 2014, the local council approved a duplex development on Lot 5 of the property, facing Harold Street, despite opposition from local residents on heritage grounds.

== Description ==
=== Garden and grounds ===
Endrim is located on the north-eastern corner of Sorrell and Harold Streets.

Its house is situated well back from Sorell Street in a mature garden and screened by a high timber paling fence on a brick base. The rear of the house faces Sorrell Street, the front of the house faces into the site. Several steps extend up to the entry, which is symmetrically flanked by two Mediterranean cypresses (Cupressus sempervirens).

Two stone gate posts are located near the south-western corner of the site and timber gates open onto a pebbled driveway which curves from the corner and sweeps around to the front of the house.

The driveway extends past the house to the former stables/garage and carport, located close to the northern site boundary.

A sandstone block wall with an arched opening extends from the north-western section of the house connecting to the former stables building to its north. A detached carport has been constructed to the east of the former stables building. Both of these are located close to the northern site boundary and neighbouring house, 56 Sorrell Street.

The driveway is bounded by open lawn and garden beds and a number of large trees, including two very tall hoop pines (Araucaria cunninghamii) and large camphor laurel (Cinnamomum camphora), Chinese elm (Ulmus parvifolia), gums, palm and other plantings. The garden also features a number of garden and landscape elements of various ages. Brick steps and piers directly in front of the house connect to overgrown rock and brick-paved pathways which extend over part of the eastern section of the site.

=== House ===
Endrim is a well constructed symmetrical 3 bay house of two storeys with a Tuscan porch to the main door and a cantilevered balcony at first floor level on the garden elevation. A glassed-in conservatory is located beneath. Some stone ground floor extensions have been added to the north side. The house is well detailed with good plaster work, four panelled doors and a geometric staircase. It is the finest example of the many Victorian suburban villas which once surrounded the town of Parramatta. It still evokes the quality of the Victorian age.

One and two storey wings extend from the north-west corner of the building.

== Heritage listing ==
The house is an example of the work of notable architect and builder, James Houison. It forms evidence of the major regional role of institutions in history of Parramatta. It is the finest example of the many Victorian suburban villas which once surrounded the town of Parramatta. The house is historically significant and is representative.

Endrim was listed on the New South Wales State Heritage Register on 2 April 1999.

== See also ==
- Australian residential architectural styles
- Media related to Endrim at Wikimedia Commons
