= 1914 Canterbury state by-election =

Election result for Canterbury, New South Wales, Australia

A by-election for the seat of Canterbury in the New South Wales Legislative Assembly was held on 10 October 1914. The by-election was triggered by the bankruptcy of Henry Peters (Labor).

== Dates ==
| Date | Event |
|---|---|
| 18 September 1914 | Henry Peters made bankrupt. |
| 23 September 1914 | Writ of election issued by the Speaker of the Legislative Assembly and close of electoral rolls. |
| 30 September 1914 | Day of nomination |
| 10 October 1914 | Polling day |
| 20 October 1914 | Return of writ |

== Candidates ==
- George Cann was a member of the Australian House of Representatives for Nepean from the 1910 federal election until his defeat at the 1913 election. He was a candidate for the Legislative Assembly seat of Upper Hunter at the 1913 NSW election, but was defeated.
- James Huston was an alderman in the Municipality of Bankstown.

== Results ==
1914 Canterbury by-election Saturday 10 October
| Party | Candidate | Votes | % | ±% |
|---|---|---|---|---|
| Labor | George Cann | 2,050 | 82.83 | |
| Independent | James Huston | 425 | 17.17 | |
| Total formal votes | | 2,475 | 100.00 | |
| Informal votes | | 0 | 0.00 | |
| Turnout | | 2,475 | 15.84 (Note: estimate based on an electoral roll of 15,623 at the 1913 election.) | |
| Labor hold | | Swing | | |

== See also ==
- Electoral results for the district of Canterbury
- List of New South Wales state by-elections
