= Orchard's Chambers =

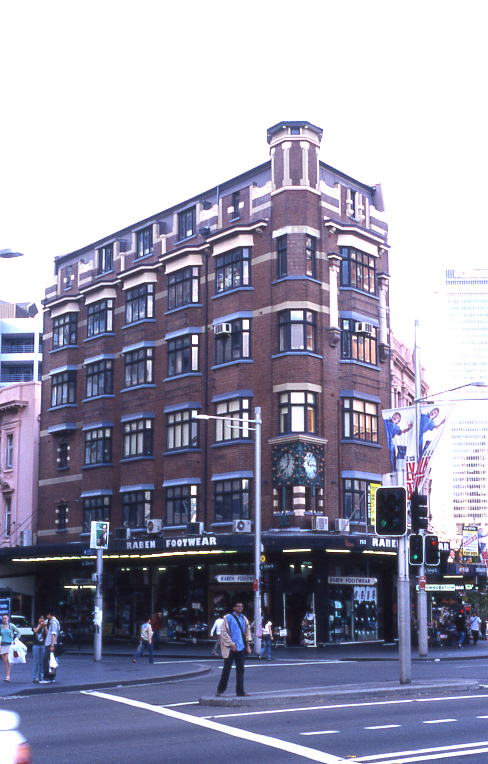
- Orchard's Chambers in 2007.
- Interactive map of the Orchard's Chambers area
- Alternative names: Orchard's Corner, Orchard's Building

General information
- Architectural style: Federation Free Style
- Location: 793–795 George Street, Haymarket, Sydney, Australia
- Coordinates: 33°52′57″S 151°12′14.5″E
- Current tenants: Raben Footwear, Alpha Japanese Salon
- Named for: Richard Orchard

Design and construction
- Architect: Ernest Lindsay Thompson

Orchard's Chambers, also known as Orchard's Corner and Orchard's Building, is a commercial building in Railway Square in the central business district of Sydney, New South Wales, Australia.

The building was constructed in 1910 and 1911 to house Richard Orchard's watchmaking and jewellery business, after the original building was demolished to make way for the extension of Quay Street to George Street. It was designed by Sydney architect Ernest Lindsay Thompson.

Orchard's Chambers was added to the New South Wales State Heritage Register on 14 December 2012.
