= Albert Rowe =

Albert Rowe may refer to:

- Albert Rowe (politician)
- Albert Rowe (physicist)
