= John Brown (Australian politician) =

Australian politician (born 1931)

The Honourable John Brown AO
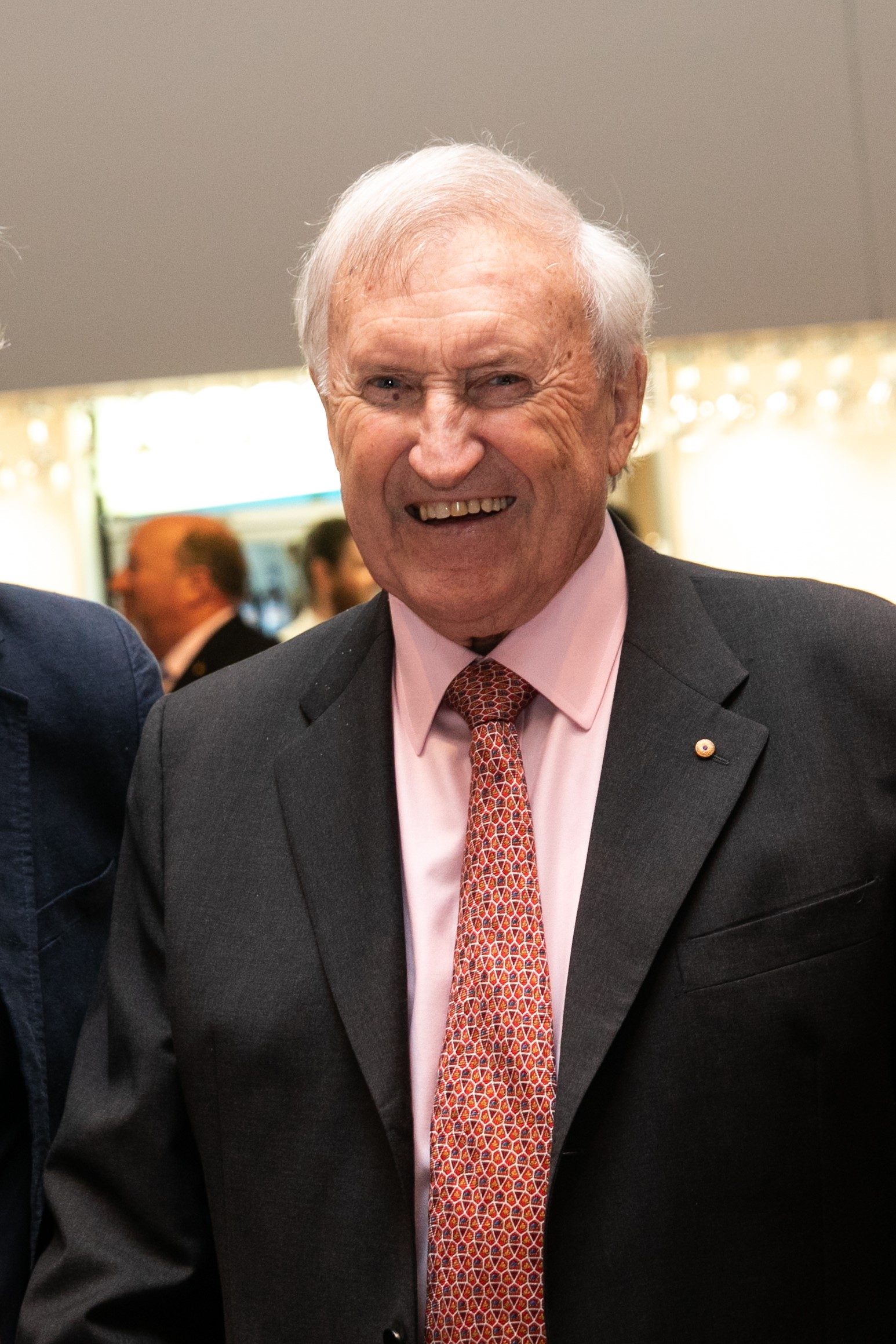
- John Brown in 2021

Minister for Arts, Sport, the Environment, Tourism and Territories
- In office 24 July 1987 – 18 December 1987
- Prime Minister: Bob Hawke
- Preceded by: Himself (Sport, Tourism); Barry Cohen (Arts, Environment); Gordon Scholes (Territories)
- Succeeded by: Graham Richardson

Minister for Sport, Recreation and Tourism
- In office 11 March 1983 – 24 July 1987
- Prime Minister: Bob Hawke
- Preceded by: New office
- Succeeded by: Himself

Minister for Administrative Services
- In office 11 March 1983 – 13 December 1984
- Prime Minister: Bob Hawke
- Preceded by: Kevin Newman
- Succeeded by: Tom Uren

Member of the Australian Parliament for Parramatta
- In office 10 December 1977 – 19 February 1990
- Preceded by: Philip Ruddock
- Succeeded by: Paul Elliott

Personal details
- Born: 19 December 1931 (age 94) Sydney, New South Wales, Australia
- Party: Labor
- Spouse: Jan Murray (divorced)
- Occupation: Businessman

John Joseph Brown AO (born 19 December 1931) is a retired Australian politician. He served in the House of Representatives from 1977 to 1990, representing the Division of Parramatta for the Australian Labor Party (ALP). He held ministerial office in the Hawke government as Minister for Administrative Services (1983–1984), Sport, Recreation and Tourism (1983–1987), and Arts, Sport, the Environment, Tourism and Territories (1987).

== Background and early career ==
Brown was born in the western suburbs of Sydney and was educated at Christian Brothers College, Burwood, St Patrick's College, Strathfield and the University of Sydney. He was one of the founders of Brown and Hatton, a meat distribution company and helped create the Pork and Bacon Marketing Council. He has been an active member of the Meat Industry Employees Union since that time, but was also chairman of the Employers Association for five years.

In 1963, he married Jan Murray, who ran a public relation consultancy from 1982 to 1995, and they have five children. Following initial reports in The Sun, Murray admitted during a 60 Minutes interview in 1987 to having sexual intercourse with Brown on his desk in his office at Parliament House in Canberra in 1983, and leaving a pair of underwear in an ashtray. A spokesperson for Australian Prime Minister Bob Hawke said while Murray's comments were in "poor taste" they had nothing to do with Brown's ministerial duties. The Canberra Times reported that Murray said she had never meant for her comments to be made public after being assured by a 60 Minutes producer that they would be edited out of the program. Murray's on-screen revelation continues to be referred to occasionally in the Australian media.

He was an alderman on Parramatta Council from 1977 to 1980.

== Federal political career ==
In 1975, Brown entered politics when he won the Australian Labor Party nomination for the seat of Parramatta. He was soundly defeated by Liberal Phillip Ruddock in that year's Coalition landslide. However, a redistribution ahead of the 1977 election split Parramatta almost in half. The western half retained the Parramatta name and became a marginal Labor seat anchored in Labor's heartland of west Sydney. The eastern half essentially became Dundas, a comfortably safe Liberal seat covering most of Ruddock's base. Believing the redistributed Parramatta was impossible to hold, Ruddock transferred to Dundas. This move proved prescient. Brown won the reconfigured Parramatta with a modest swing in his favour even in the midst of a second consecutive Coalition landslide while Ruddock handily won Dundas. Brown was only the second Labor member to win Parramatta since Federation. As well, it was the first time that the non-Labor parties had won government without winning Parramatta.

With the election of Bob Hawke in 1983, he was appointed Minister for Sport, Recreation and Tourism in the First Hawke Ministry, a position he retained until 1988. He was also appointed Minister for Administrative Services until 1984, when he gained the position of Minister assisting the Minister for Defence.

Brown is notable for initiating a series of television advertisements commencing in 1986 for the American market by the Australian Tourism Commission starring Paul Hogan saying, "I'll slip an extra shrimp on the barbie for you". He gained notoriety for describing koalas as "flea-ridden, piddling, stinking, scratching, rotten little things". He was also responsible for substantially increasing expenditure on sports facilities around Australia and the Australian Institute of Sport.

In July 1987, Brown entered cabinet with the expanded portfolio of Minister for Arts, Sport, the Environment, Tourism and Territories, which he held until his resignation in January 1988 for misleading the House, in response to a question from Neil Brown (no relation) regarding the assessment of tenders for the Australian Pavilion at Expo '88, which suggested possible impropriety. He did not stand for re-election in 1990. He and Jan Murray later divorced.

== Post-political career ==
Brown established the Sport and Tourism Youth Foundation (formerly the John Brown Foundation) to award scholarships to talented young Australians in both sport and tourism. A member of the Sydney Olympics 2000 Bid Committee, he was also a founding Director of the Sydney Olympic Games Organising Committee (SOCOG). He has held positions including Director of Macquarie Tourism and Leisure, Director of Canterbury Bankstown Leagues Club and a consultant to Service Corporation International Australia. In mid June 2012, John Brown sparked local controversy after supporting a full-page ad in the local Inner West Courier newspaper, supporting the actions of the Rozelle Village development. The development, which has sparked large controversy in the Sydney inner west suburb of Rozelle, is before the NSW Department of Planning and Infrastructure.

== Honours ==
Brown was made an Officer of the Order of Australia in 1993 for "service to the Australian parliament, tourism and sport and recreation".

Political offices
Preceded by Kevin Newman	Minister for Administrative Services; 1983–84	Succeeded by Tom Uren
New title	Minister for Sport, Recreation and Tourism; 1983–87	Succeeded by Graham Richardson
Preceded by Barry Cohen	Minister for Arts, Sport, the Environment, Tourism and Territories; 1987–88	Succeeded by Graham Richardson
Parliament of Australia
Preceded by Philip Ruddock	Member for Division of Parramatta; 1977–90	Succeeded by Paul Elliott
