= Paul Elliott (politician) =

Australian politician

The Honourable Paul Elliott

Member of the Australian Parliament for Parramatta
- In office 24 March 1990 – 2 March 1996
- Preceded by: John Brown
- Succeeded by: Ross Cameron

Personal details
- Born: 24 September 1954 (age 71) Ballina, New South Wales
- Party: Australian Labor Party
- Occupation: Public servant

Robert Paul Elliott (born 24 September 1954) is an Australian politician. He was a Labor member of the Australian House of Representatives from 1990 to 1996, representing the division of Parramatta.

Elliott was born in Ballina, New South Wales and earned a Bachelor of Arts and a MLitt at the University of New England. He worked as a lecturer at the University of Western Sydney, a public servant and an electoral officer to Labor MP John Brown. He was elected as an alderman on Parramatta City Council in 1977 and was mayor from 1984 to 1986.

Following the retirement of John Brown, Elliott was elected to federal parliament at the 1990 election. He was appointed Parliamentary Secretary to the Treasurer in the Keating government in December 1993. In June 1994, he became Parliamentary Secretary to the Minister for Communications and the Arts and Parliamentary Secretary to the Minister for Tourism as well. He was defeated at the 1996 election.

== Notes ==
Parliament of Australia
Preceded by John Brown	Member for Parramatta; 1990–1996	Succeeded by Ross Cameron
