= 1973 Parramatta by-election =

Australian federal by-election

A by-election was held for the Australian House of Representatives seat of Parramatta on 22 September 1973. The by-election was triggered by the resignation of former Liberal Party long-serving Attorney General and Minister for Foreign Affairs, the Honourable (and later Sir) Nigel Bowen who accepted an appointment to the NSW Court of Appeal.

The seat was retained by the Liberal Party, with Philip Ruddock defeating Michael Whelan, who contested the seat for the Labor Party. Ten other candidates from minor parties contested the seat.

This was the first federal election in which eighteen-year-olds were eligible to vote, the voting age having been lowered from twenty-one earlier in the year.

== Results ==
Parramatta by-election, 1973
Party	Candidate	Votes	%	±%
Liberal	Philip Ruddock	33,506	52.6	+6.6
Labor	Michael Whelan	24,623	38.7	−7.3
Australia	John Butterworth	3,522	5.5	+2.0
Independent	Marilyn Pye	575	0.9	n/a
Defence of Government Schools	Michael Hourihan	528	0.8	n/a
Independent	Marcus Aussie-Stone	363	0.6	n/a
Independent	Sidney McGarrity	325	0.6	n/a
Independent	Gwenda Lister	65	0.1	n/a
Independent	Charles Bellchambers	53	0.1	n/a
National Socialist	Ross May	37	0.1	n/a
Independent	Leonard Kiernan	30	0.0	n/a
Independent	Kevin Meares	25	0.0	n/a
Total formal votes		63,652	97.7	−0.1
Informal votes		1,493	2.3	+0.1
Turnout		65,145	88.4	−7.3
Liberal hold		Swing	+2.3	

== See also ==
- List of Australian federal by-elections
