= Division of Dundas =

Former Australian federal electoral division

Dundas Australian House of Representatives Division
- Created: 1977
- Abolished: 1993
- Namesake: Henry Dundas

The Division of Dundas was an Australian Electoral Division in New South Wales. It was created in 1977 and abolished in 1993. The seat was held by Liberal Party member of parliament Philip Ruddock.

== History ==
The division was created in 1977 and abolished in 1993. It was named for the Sydney suburb of Dundas, which was in turn named for Henry Dundas, 1st Viscount Melville, who was British Home Secretary 1791–94. It was located in the northern suburbs of Sydney, including Carlingford, Eastwood and Epping.

Dundas was created when Parramatta was split. A small western portion retained the Parramatta name, while the majority eastern portion became Dundas. The new seat included nearly all of the Liberal-friendly areas of the old Parramatta, and was thus a natural choice for Parramatta's former member, Philip Ruddock, to transfer to before the 1977 election.

For most of its existence, it was a safe seat for the Liberal Party and Ruddock held it without serious difficulty until 1993, when the seat was abolished. The former territory of Dundas was then split between Parramatta (west), Bennelong (east) and Berowra (north), and Ruddock opted to run for the seat of Berowra.

== Members ==
Image	Member	Party	Term	Notes
	Philip Ruddock (1943–)	Liberal	10 December 1977 – 13 March 1993	Previously held the Division of Parramatta. Transferred to the Division of Berowra after Dundas was abolished in 1993
