= George Cann =

Australian politician (1871–1948)

The Honourable George Cann
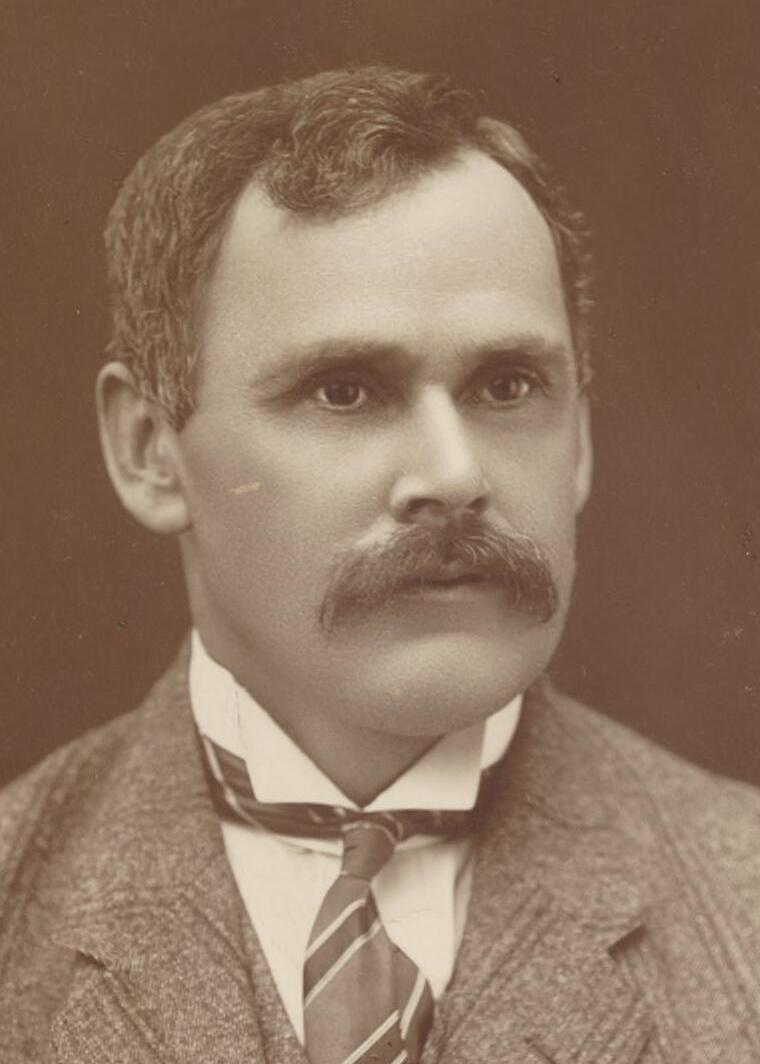

Member of the Australian Parliament for Nepean
- In office 13 April 1910 – 31 May 1913
- Preceded by: Eric Bowden
- Succeeded by: Richard Orchard

Member of the New South Wales Legislative Assembly for Canterbury
- In office 10 October 1914 – 1920
- Preceded by: Henry Peters
- Succeeded by: Constituency abolished

Personal details
- Born: 30 May 1871 Cramlington, England
- Died: 18 October 1948 (aged 77) Strathfield, New South Wales, Australia
- Party: Labor
- Spouse: Catherine Roberts (m. 1890)
- Occupation: Miner

George Cann (30 May 1871 – 18 October 1948) was an Australian politician who served in both the Parliament of Australia and the Parliament of New South Wales. At state level he served as a minister in the governments of Jack Lang during the 1920s. He was a miner before entering politics.

== Early life ==
Cann was born at Shankhouse, Cramlington, Northumberland, England, educated at Cramlington National School and became a coalminer at eleven. His elder brother John Cann migrated to New South Wales in 1887. Cann married Catherine Roberts in 1890 and they had one daughter and one son. They migrated to NSW in 1900 and Cann worked as a miner near Lithgow and became involved in the Western Miners' Association. He served in the 30th Battalion of the first Australian Imperial Force from March 1916 until January 1918.

== Political career ==
George Cann was a member of the Australian Labor Party, winning the Australian House of Representatives seat of Nepean at the 1910 election. He was defeated at the 1913 election. That year he unsuccessfully contested the NSW Legislative Assembly seat of Upper Hunter. In 1914, he won the 1914 Canterbury by-election, joining his brother John, then Colonial Secretary, in the Legislative Assembly. Cann held Canterbury at the 1917 election. In 1920 the district was abolished and absorbed into the new multi-member seat of St George; he was one of the members for St George until the abolition of proportional representation in 1927. He was Secretary for Mines and Minister for Labour and Industry from April 1920 to October 1921, when he became Secretary for Mines and Minister for Local Government until the defeat of the James Dooley government in December 1921. He was reappointed when Dooley regained power some hours later. He became Minister for Local Government and Minister for Public Health in Jack Lang's first ministry in June 1925. He held the Local Government portfolio until March 1926 and Public Health until May 1927. He opposed Lang's leadership and as a result lost preselection for the 1927 election where he ran unsuccessfully as an independent for Lakemba.

== Later life ==
In 1930 Cann ran unsuccessfully as a Nationalist at the election for Lakemba.

He died on 18 October 1948 (aged 77) in the Sydney suburb of Strathfield, survived by his wife.

Parliament of Australia
Preceded by Eric Bowden	Member for Nepean; 1910–1913	Succeeded by Richard Orchard
Parliament of New South Wales
Preceded by Henry Peters	Member for Canterbury; 1914–1920	District abolished
Preceded by William Bagnall	Member for St George; 1920–1927; With: Bagnall / Cahill; Gosling; Ley / Bagnall; Arkins	Succeeded by Joseph Cahill
