= Andrew Charlton =

Australian politician (born 1978)

The Honourable Andrew Charlton MP
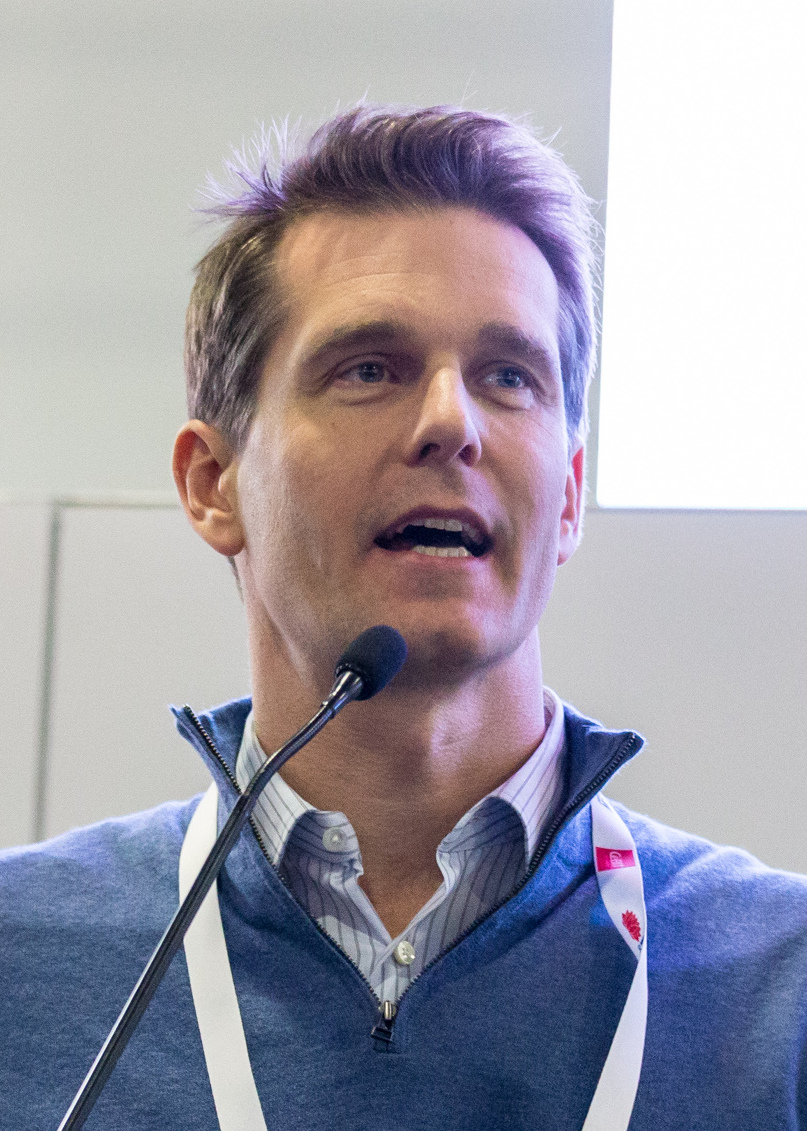
- Charlton in 2018

Cabinet Secretary
- Incumbent
- Assumed office 13 May 2025
- Prime Minister: Anthony Albanese
- Preceded by: Mark Dreyfus

Assistant Minister for Science, Technology and the Digital Economy
- Incumbent
- Assumed office 13 May 2025
- Prime Minister: Anthony Albanese
- Minister: Tim Ayres
- Preceded by: Tim Ayres (as Assistant Minister for a Future Made In Australia)

Member of the Australian Parliament for Parramatta
- Incumbent
- Assumed office 21 May 2022
- Preceded by: Julie Owens

Personal details
- Born: 26 September 1978 (age 48) Sydney, New South Wales, Australia
- Party: Labor
- Spouse: Phoebe Arcus
- Children: 3
- Education: Knox Grammar School
- Alma mater: University of Sydney (BEc); Oxford University (MEc, PhD)
- Profession: Politician; economist

Andrew Henry George Charlton (born 26 September 1978) is an Australian politician and economist who has served as the Cabinet Secretary and the Assistant Minister for Science, Technology and the Digital Economy since 2025. He has been the member of parliament (MP) for the New South Wales division of Parramatta since 2022.

Charlton has been described in the media as a "centrist, evidence-based, data-driven economist with entrepreneurial flair". He is the author of several books on economics including Fair Trade for All which he co-authored with Joseph Stiglitz. From 2007 to 2010, he worked as the chief economic adviser to Prime Minister Kevin Rudd, before founding his own consultancy firm which would later be acquired by Accenture.

== Early life and education ==
Andrew Charlton was born in Sydney, New South Wales in 1978. He attended Knox Grammar School in Wahroonga.

Charlton then attended the University of Sydney to study economics, where he was a resident of St Paul's College. He was awarded the university medal for economics. He later won a Rhodes Scholarship to attend the University of Oxford, where he earned a DPhil in economics.

== Career in economics ==
=== Economic adviser ===
From December 2007 to June 2010, Charlton served as the chief economic adviser to prime minister Kevin Rudd. Charlton played a role alongside Rudd in overseeing Australia's response to the 2008 financial crisis and the Great Recession.

Charlton was Australia's senior official sent to the Copenhagen Climate Conference in 2009 at the request of Prime Minister Kevin Rudd.

In 2009, Charlton made news after he was threatened by then Opposition Leader Malcolm Turnbull at the Midwinter Ball over the Utegate controversy.

=== Private business ===
In 2015, Charlton founded AlphaBeta Advisors, a consulting and technology firm and served as its director until it was acquired by Accenture in February 2020. Charlton was subsequently named Accenture's Sustainability Services Lead for Growth Markets.

== Political career ==
=== 2022 federal election ===
==== Nomination as Labor candidate ====
In October 2021 then-Member for Parramatta Julie Owens announced she would not contest the next election, creating an open preselection for the seat. Owens declared her wish for a rank-and-file preselection to determine the candidate for the marginal seat. Several locals declared their intention to nominate, however the Labor Party instead continued 'shopping around' for a candidate. Charlton's eventual announcement as the parachute candidate created a furore in local branches (although this is contested) and the media. Many questioned Charlton's capacity to represent the electorate. However, others declared Charlton was exactly the calibre of person needed in Parliament. Labor leader Anthony Albanese supported Charlton's candidacy. He became the candidate on 1 April 2022 with only 50 days until the election.

==== Election result ====
In the 2022 federal election, Charlton secured more than 34,000 first preference votes (40.66%). After preference flows, he secured 54.57% of the two-party-preferred vote, representing a 1.07-point positive swing. He claimed victory on the night of the election following concession by his opponent, Maria Kovacic.

=== 2025 federal election ===
Charlton was re-elected in the 2025 federal election. He was appointed Cabinet Secretary and Assistant Minister for Science, Technology and the Digital Economy in the second Albanese ministry.

== Personal life ==
Charlton is married to barrister Phoebe Arcus, with whom he has three children.

Charlton moved from a $16 million home in Bellevue Hill and purchased a house in North Parramatta in May 2022 to be more connected with the electors in the division of Parramatta. He later purchased a sub-penthouse in Parramatta when he was unable to renovate the previously purchased property. Despite buying the property in Parramatta, as of 2025, Charlton lives partially in Bellevue Hill, and his children attend school in the eastern suburbs.

Charlton purchased a $12 million home in Palm Beach in 2024. Charlton's children continue to attend schools in the Eastern suburbs of Sydney.

== Publications ==
Charlton has authored several books on economics:

=== Fair Trade for All (2005) ===
In Fair Trade for All, lead author Joseph Stiglitz and Charlton argue that it is important to make the trading world more development friendly. Stiglitz and Charlton advocate "a carefully managed trade liberalization agenda," and reject the Washington Consensus's "simple prescription of rapid liberalization and privatization of markets," arguing that this contributes to inequality. The idea is put forth that the present regime of tariffs and agricultural subsidies is dominated by the interests of former colonial powers and needs to change. The removal of the bias toward the developed world will be beneficial to both developing and developed nations. They note that the developing world suffers from many "pervasive market failures" inhibiting the effectiveness of trade liberalisation, including "a lack of credit and insurance markets and an undersupply of public goods". The developing world is in need of assistance, and this can only be achieved when developed nations abandon mercantilist based priorities and work towards a more liberal world trade regime. However, they advocate limiting a "pro-development trade agenda" to poverty-reduction issues. Fundamentally, the central trade agenda they propose is that "all WTO members should provide free market access to all goods from developing nations poorer and smaller than themselves.".

=== Ozonomics (2007) ===
In Ozonomics, Charlton examines the true accuracy of the mythology surrounding the economic management of the Howard-Costello years in Australia.

=== Australia's Pivot to India (2023) ===
On 27 September 2023, Charlton launched Australia's Pivot to India at Riverside Theatres Parramatta alongside prime minister Anthony Albanese. The book examines Australian-Indian geopolitical relations, and how they can balance the Indo-Pacific region.

Parliament of Australia
Preceded by Julie Owens	Member for Parramatta; 2022–present	Incumbent
Political offices
Preceded by Mark Dreyfus	Cabinet Secretary; 2025–present	Incumbent
