= Julie Owens =

Australian politician (born 1958)

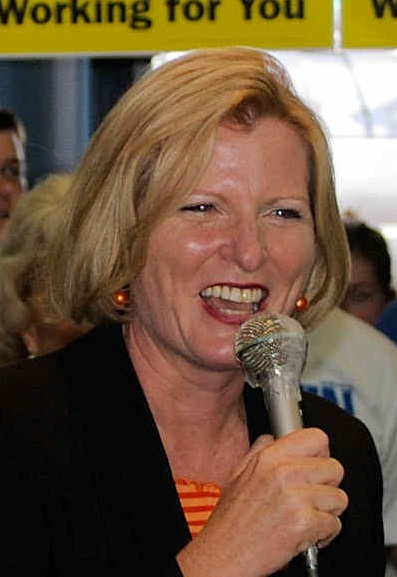
- Owens in 2007

Member of the Australian Parliament for Parramatta
- In office 9 October 2004 – 11 April 2022
- Preceded by: Ross Cameron
- Succeeded by: Andrew Charlton

Personal details
- Born: 17 October 1958 (age 68) Rockhampton, Queensland, Australia
- Party: Labor
- Education: Queensland Conservatorium of Music; University of Sydney
- Occupation: Performing arts executive
- Website: www.julieowens.com.au

Julie Ann Owens (born 17 October 1958) is an Australian former politician who served as a member of the Australian House of Representatives for Parramatta from 2004 to 2022, when she retired from politics.

== Early life ==
Owens was born on 17 October 1958 in Rockhampton, Queensland. Her family moved to Brisbane as a result of her father's career in the army. Owens attended Everton Park State High School. She went on to attend the Queensland Conservatorium of Music, studying piano under Nancy Weir and graduating with a Bachelor of Arts in Music.

Owens was a production manager at the Lyric Opera of Queensland from 1985 to 1989, where she was involved in productions of Aida, La bohème and Madama Butterfly. She later worked as a senior program officer at the Australia Council from 1989 to 1993 and CEO of the Association of Independent Record Labels from 2000 to 2004. She was also a small-business owner and completed an MBA at the University of Sydney.

== Politics ==
Owens stood as the Labor candidate in North Sydney in 1996 and 1998. On both occasions she was given very little chance of winning, as North Sydney had long been a conservative stronghold, and the seat was won both times by Liberal MP Joe Hockey.

In the 2004 election campaign, Owens ran against the incumbent Liberal Ross Cameron. The campaign was notable for the admission by Cameron, a prominent family values campaigner, that he had had an extramarital affair, and Owens won the seat on preferences, despite a swing against the Labor Party in New South Wales.

Owens is a backbencher and has been a member of the House of Representatives Standing Committee for Communications, Information Technology and the Arts from December 2004. Although her seat was made notionally Liberal in a redistribution ahead of the 2007 election, she did not only retained her seat, but recorded a healthy swing of seven points. She won a third term in 2010 with only a small swing against her, and narrowly won a fourth term in 2013 even as Labor lost government. Her 2013 victory marked only the second time (her initial win being the first) that the Liberals or their predecessors have been in government without holding Parramatta.

Following the resignation of Labor MP Craig Thomson as chair of the Economics Committee, Owens was appointed head of the committee.

On 28 October 2021, Owens announced in Parliament that she would not contest the next election. She was succeeded by Andrew Charlton as Labor candidate and member for Parramatta at the 2022 election.

Parliament of Australia
Preceded by Ross Cameron	Member for Parramatta; 2004–2022	Succeeded by Andrew Charlton
