= Philip Ruddock =

Australian politician (born 1943)

The Honourable Philip Ruddock AO
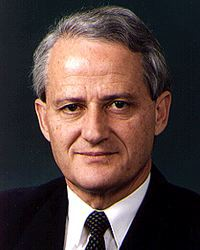

Mayor of Hornsby Shire
- In office 10 September 2017 – 14 September 2024
- Preceded by: Steve Russell
- Succeeded by: Warren Waddell

Chief Government Whip in the House of Representatives
- In office 18 September 2013 – 13 February 2015
- Prime Minister: Tony Abbott
- Preceded by: Chris Hayes
- Succeeded by: Scott Buchholz

Attorney-General of Australia
- In office 7 October 2003 – 3 December 2007
- Prime Minister: John Howard
- Preceded by: Daryl Williams
- Succeeded by: Robert McClelland

Father of the House
- In office 1 September 1998 – 9 May 2016
- Preceded by: Ian Sinclair
- Succeeded by: Kevin Andrews

Minister for Immigration and Multicultural and Indigenous Affairs
- In office 11 March 1996 – 7 October 2003
- Prime Minister: John Howard
- Preceded by: Nick Bolkus
- Succeeded by: Amanda Vanstone

Member of the Australian Parliament for Berowra
- In office 13 March 1993 – 9 May 2016
- Preceded by: Harry Edwards
- Succeeded by: Julian Leeser

Member of the Australian Parliament for Dundas
- In office 10 December 1977 – 13 March 1993
- Preceded by: Seat created
- Succeeded by: Seat abolished

Member of the Australian Parliament for Parramatta
- In office 22 September 1973 – 10 December 1977
- Preceded by: Nigel Bowen
- Succeeded by: John Brown

Personal details
- Born: 12 March 1943 (age 83) Canberra, Australia
- Party: Liberal Party of Australia
- Spouse: Heather Ruddock (m. 1970)
- Parent: Max Ruddock (father)
- Education: Barker College
- Alma mater: Sydney Law School; University of Sydney
- Occupation: Solicitor; Diplomat
- Profession: Lawyer; Politician

Philip Maxwell Ruddock (born 12 March 1943) is an Australian politician who served as the 32nd Attorney-General of Australia from 2003 to 2007 under prime minister John Howard. A member of the Liberal Party, he was elected to the House of Representatives from 1973 to 2016; by the time of his retirement Ruddock was the last Member of Parliament (MP) to have sat during the Whitlam and Fraser governments. He was both the Father of the House and the Father of the Parliament from 1998 to retirement. He is the second longest-serving parliamentarian in the history of the Australian Parliament; only Billy Hughes has served longer.

First elected in a by-election in Parramatta, Ruddock held the seat of Dundas from 1977 to 1993, then that of Berowra. He served continuously in the ministry during the Howard government, as Minister for Immigration and Multicultural Affairs from 1996 to 2001 (promoted to the federal Cabinet in 2003), Minister for Immigration and Multicultural and Indigenous Affairs from 2001 to 2003, and Attorney-General from 2003 to 2007. As Immigration Minister, Ruddock played a central role in implementing the Pacific Solution in 2001.

In 2016 Ruddock was appointed the Australian Special Envoy for Human Rights. He later served as Mayor of Hornsby Shire Council from 2017 to 2024. He is a Vice Chair of the Global Panel Foundation Australasia.

== Early life and education ==
Philip Ruddock was born in Canberra, the son of Emmie (née Chappell) and Max Ruddock. His father was the Deputy Prices Commissioner working for the Commonwealth Government. The senior Ruddock was later a Liberal member of the New South Wales Legislative Assembly from 1962 to 1976 and a state minister in the Lewis and Willis governments.

Ruddock was educated at Barker College in the suburb of Hornsby before attending the University of Sydney, after which he practised as a solicitor. He was articled to the firm Berne, Murray and Tout and was promoted to partner.

From 1973 to 1974, Ruddock was the federal president of the Young Liberals.

== Political career ==
=== Early career, MP and first term in government 1973–1996 ===
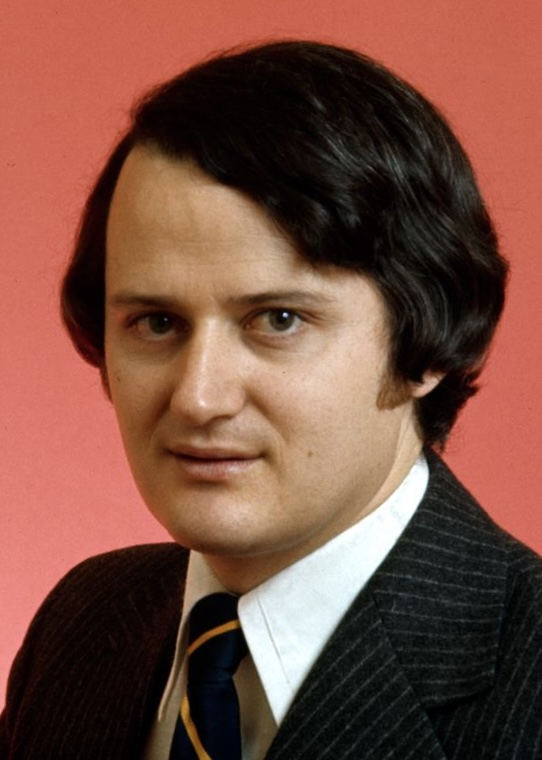
Ruddock in 1974

On 22 September 1973, Ruddock was elected to the House of Representatives at a by-election for the seat of Parramatta. He narrowly held it at the 1974 general election, but was returned with a large swing in 1975. A redistribution ahead of the 1977 election, however, split Parramatta almost in half. The western half retained the Parramatta name and became a marginal Labor seat anchored in heavily pro-Labor west Sydney. The eastern half, including most of the old Parramatta's Liberal-friendly areas, became the comfortably safe Liberal seat of Dundas. Ruddock transferred to Dundas, a move that proved prescient. While his Labor opponent from 1975, John Brown, won Parramatta with a small swing, Ruddock won Dundas resoundingly. He held it without serious difficulty until its abolition in 1993. Ruddock then transferred to the equally safe seat of Berowra, a seat he held for the remainder of his federal political career.

==== Shadow Minister (1983–1996) ====
Ruddock was a member of the Opposition Shadow Ministry from 1983 to 1985 and from 1989 to 1996. In the 1980s and early 1990s, he was an active member of the parliamentary group of Amnesty International. In 2000, Ruddock was disavowed by Amnesty International due to the treatment of refugees by the Howard government and asked not to wear his Amnesty International badge while performing ministerial duties.

While Ruddock was still a backbencher, the Leader of the Opposition, John Howard, commented that he believed the rate of Asian immigration was too high. The Hawke Labor government sought to introduced a motion to Parliament to ensure that immigration did not discriminate on the basis of race. Ruddock along with fellow Liberals Steele Hall and Ian Macphee crossed the floor to support the Labor motion. In 1989, following Andrew Peacock's ascension to the leadership, Ruddock became Shadow Minister for Immigration and proposed a settlement scheme for Australia's far north.

=== Cabinet Minister, second term in government (1996–2007) ===
==== Minister for Immigration ====
Following the Coalition's rise to government at the 1996 election, Ruddock was appointed Minister for Immigration and Multicultural Affairs. Following the 1998 election, Ruddock was promoted to Cabinet. In this role, he administered the Department of Immigration and Multicultural Affairs and presided over the Howard government's policies on asylum seekers. During his time in office, the previous Keating Labor government's practice of mandatory detention of asylum seekers was continued and extended. In October 1999, the Australian government introduced Temporary Protection Visas for persons who applied for refugee status after making an unauthorised arrival in Australia, and was the main type of visa issued to refugees when released from Australian immigration detention facilities. Many Afghan and Iraqi refugees who are not Australian citizens were affected by this policy.

==== Minister for Indigenous Affairs ====
Ruddock was appointed to the role of Minister for Indigenous Affairs, in 2001. By 2001 he had become a high-profile figure enjoying considerable support within the Liberal Party, while being strongly opposed by left-wing activists and some human rights advocates.

Ruddock's "Pacific Solution" – which prevented asylum seekers receiving legal access – was condemned by Human Rights Watch as contravening international law, as being a human rights violation: Oxfam and the UNHCR (United Nations refugee agency) agreed with this viewpoint.

Ruddock's decisions were highly controversial and led to Amnesty International's public attempt to distance the organisation from him by asking him to remove his lapel badge.

In 2003, Ruddock was accused by the Labor immigration spokesperson, Julia Gillard, of personally intervening to give a Filipino with a criminal record, Dante Tan, favourable treatment in exchange for donations to the Liberal Party. Ruddock denied that there was a connection between the donations and his actions, and noted that the donation had been properly declared. In 2004, an Australian Federal Police investigation cleared Ruddock of any wrongdoing, and a Senate inquiry, composed of a majority of Labor members, found that "there was no way to determine whether Mr Ruddock was influenced by money to grant visas."

==== Attorney-General ====
In 2003, Ruddock was Attorney-General in a cabinet reshuffle. On 27 May 2004, Ruddock introduced the Marriage Legislation Amendment Bill to prevent any possible court rulings allowing same-sex marriages or civil unions.

Ruddock defended a decision to deny a gay veteran's partner a spousal pension, despite their 38-year same-sex relationship.

The UN Human Rights Commission found the Australian government in violation of equality and privacy rights under the International Covenant of Civil and Political Rights, but Ruddock insisted the government was not bound by the ruling.

In May 2006, Ruddock blocked a gay Australian man from marrying in Europe.

Ruddock refused to grant a gay man living in the Netherlands a 'Certificate of No Impediment to Marriage' document required by some European countries before marriage, to prove foreigners are in fact single. Under Ruddock's instructions, no such documents were to be released to gay and lesbians individuals intending to marry overseas.

In July 2007, he remarked that Australia needs to improve its legislation to deal with pro-terrorist literature and media. "People who may be susceptible to carrying out a terrorist act ought not to be instructed in how to do it, how to use household products to produce a bomb, or be encouraged to think about violent jihad and taking their own life", he said.

In 2007 Ruddock and the New South Wales Right to Life Association complained to the Australian Classification Board about the sale in Australia of The Peaceful Pill Handbook by Philip Nitschke and Fiona Stewart. The book provides information on assisted death and voluntary euthanasia. The complaint resulted in the book's banning from sale in Australia. Nitschke commented that "No other country in the world ... has gone down this path – Australia stands alone" and that the Ruddock's action represented a "significant erosion to the free speech principle and it's extremely disappointing".

=== Opposition, 2007–2013 ===
Following the November 2007 election, Ruddock did not seek a shadow cabinet role and returned to the backbench.

He returned to the frontbench as Shadow Cabinet Secretary after Tony Abbott captured the opposition leadership in December 2009. The Coalition was returned to government in 2013.

=== Third term in government and retirement, 2013–2016 ===
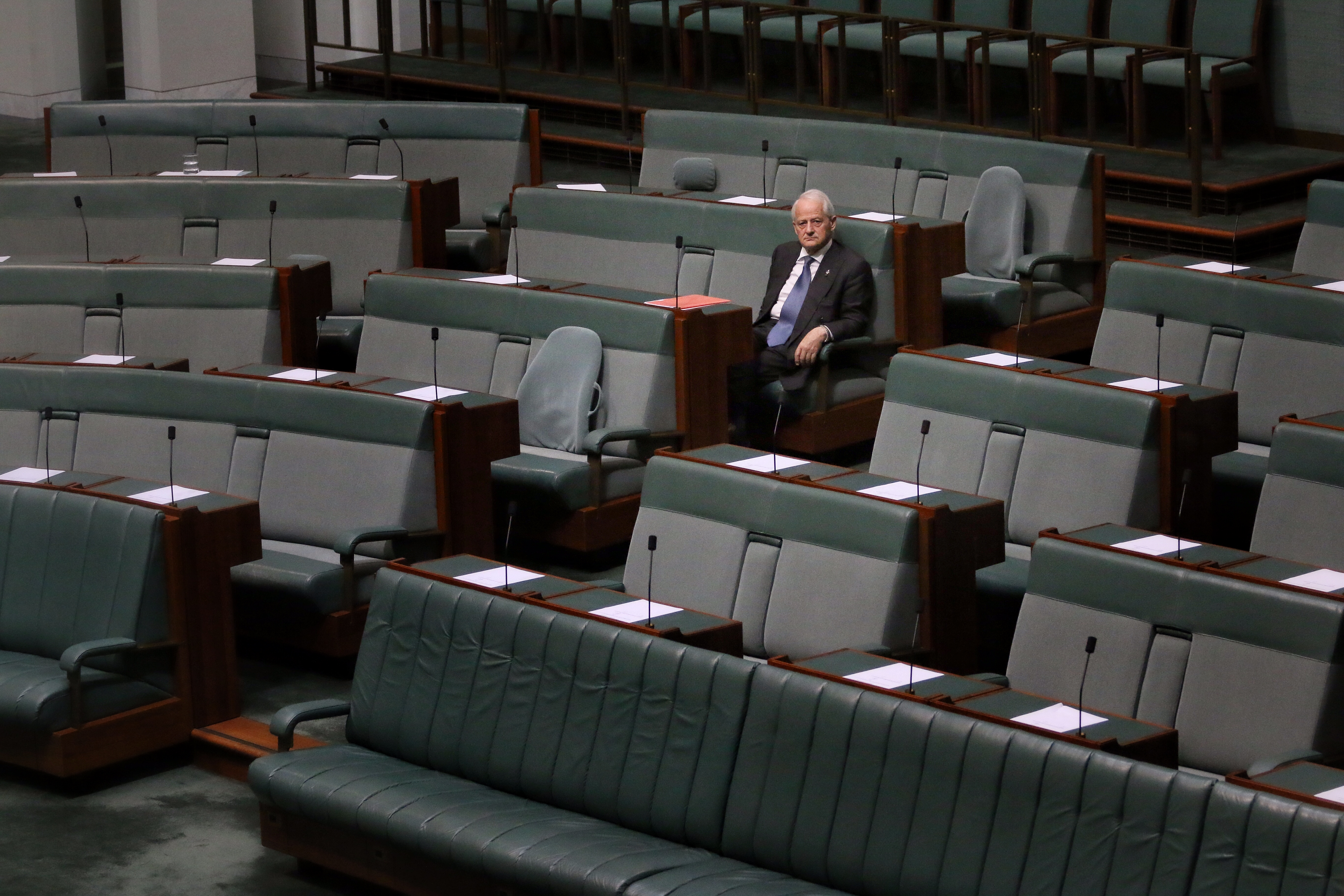
Ruddock in Parliament, 2016

Ruddock was named the Chief Government Whip in the House of Representatives in the Abbott government, which took office on 18 September 2013.

Ruddock was replaced as Chief Government Whip by Queensland MP Scott Buchholz on 13 February 2015.

On 27 May 2015, Ruddock was appointed to the new office of Special Envoy for Citizenship and Community Engagement. The office was created in the wake of controversial proposals by the government to strip sole Australian nationals of their citizenship.

On 8 February 2016, Ruddock announced that he would not contest the next federal election and would be retiring from politics.

On 8 February 2016, foreign minister Julie Bishop announced that Ruddock would be appointed Australia's first special envoy for human rights.

== Post-parliamentary career ==
Ruddock was appointed the Australian Special Envoy for Human Rights on 8 February 2016. During this period he represented Australia abroad for the promotion and protections of human rights.

In August 2017, Ruddock announced his candidacy for Mayor of Hornsby Shire and was declared elected on 16 September 2017.

In November 2017, Ruddock accepted an invitation from prime minister Malcolm Turnbull, to chair a review of religious freedoms in Australia in light of the Australian Marriage Law Postal Survey and the introduction into federal parliament a private member's bill to enact the Marriage Amendment (Definition and Religious Freedoms) Act 2017.

In February 2018, Ruddock was elected as the state president of the Liberal Party NSW Division.

In August 2024 Ruddock lost Liberal Party pre-selection for the position of Mayor for the 2024 Local Government election and retired at the same election.

The Philip Ruddock Heritage Centre in Parramatta is named in Ruddock's honour.

Ruddock released a book titled Nation Building: How Immigration Made Australia in September 2026. The book examines how immigration policy shaped modern Australia.

== Personal life ==
Ruddock is married with two children.

Ruddock's daughters found it difficult to reconcile their father's hard line on immigration with the values of compassion they were raised with.

== See also ==
- Political families of Australia

Political offices
Preceded by Nick Bolkus	Minister for Immigration and Multicultural and Indigenous Affairs; 1996–2003	Succeeded by Amanda Vanstone
Preceded by Daryl Williams	Attorney-General for Australia; 2003–2007	Succeeded by Robert McClelland
Parliament of Australia
Preceded by Ian Sinclair	Father of the Parliament; 1998–2016	Succeeded by Ian Macdonald
Preceded by Ian Sinclair	Father of the House of Representatives; 1998–2016	Succeeded by Kevin Andrews
Preceded by Nigel Bowen	Member for Parramatta; 1973–1977	Succeeded by John Brown
New division	Member for Dundas; 1977–1993	Division abolished
Preceded by Harry Edwards	Member for Berowra; 1993–2016	Succeeded by Julian Leeser
Civic offices
Preceded by Steve Russell	Mayor of Hornsby Shire; 2017–2024	Succeeded by Warren Waddell
