= 1921 Parramatta by-election =

- 10 December 1921
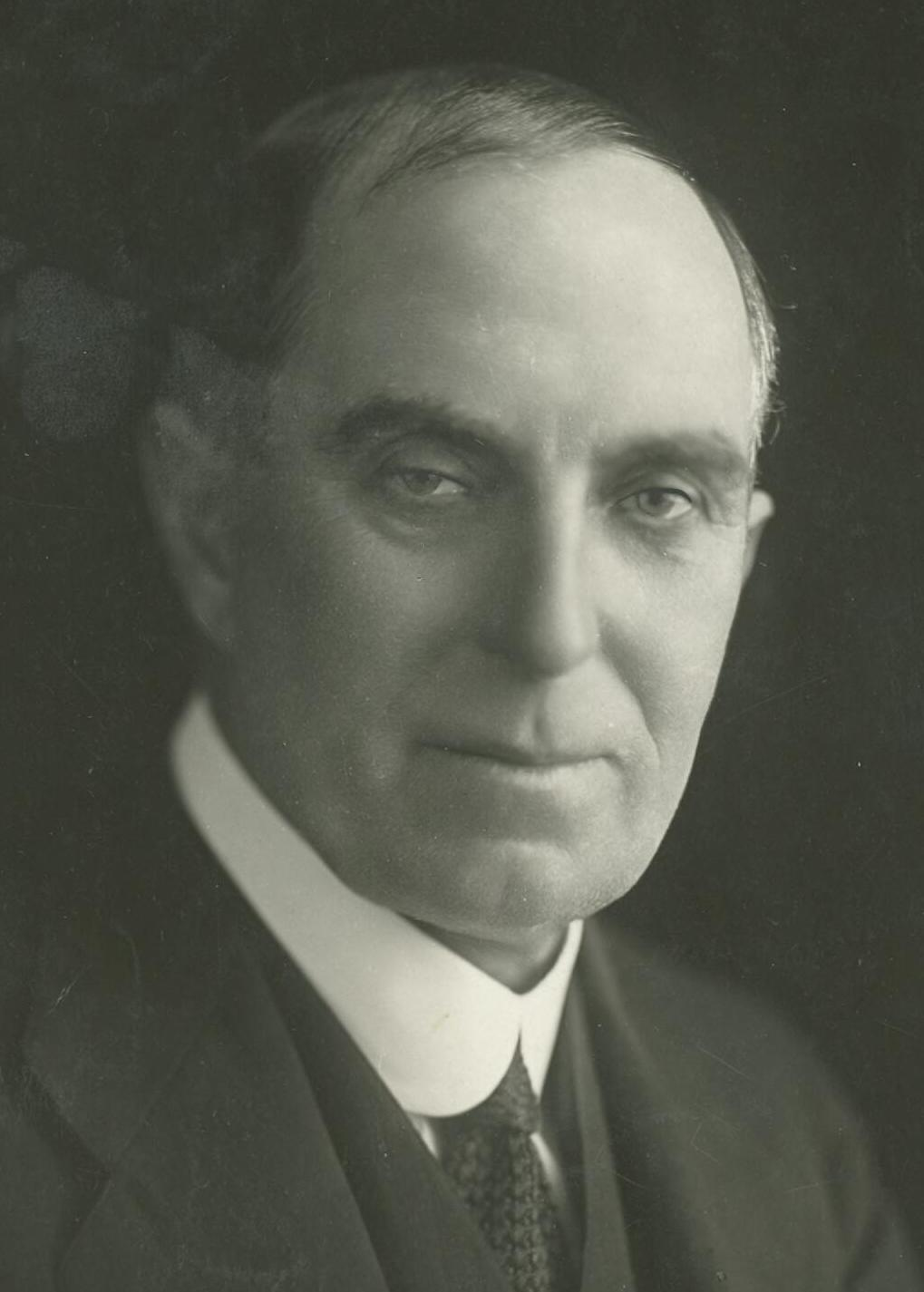
| | First party | Second party |
|---|---|---|
| | | ALP |
| Candidate | Herbert Pratten | William Hutchison |
| Party | Nationalist | Labor |
| Popular vote | 20,768 | 5,625 |
| Percentage | 66.0% | 17.9% |
| Swing | ▼6.6pp | ▼9.5pp |
| TPP | 76.0% | 26.0% |
| TPP swing | ▲3.4pp | ▼3.4pp |
MP before election
Joseph Cook
Nationalist
Elected MP
Herbert Pratten
Nationalist

A by-election was held for the Australian House of Representatives seat of Parramatta on 10 December 1921. This was triggered by the resignation of Nationalist MP, Treasurer and former Prime Minister Sir Joseph Cook to become Australian High Commissioner to the United Kingdom.

The by-election was won by Nationalist candidate Herbert Pratten, who resigned from the Senate to run.

== Results ==
Parramatta by-election, 1921
| Party | Candidate | Votes | % | ±% |
|---|---|---|---|---|
| Nationalist | Herbert Pratten | 20,768 | 66.0 | −6.6 |
| Labor | William Hutchison | 5,625 | 17.9 | −9.5 |
| Independent | Albert Piddington | 2,787 | 8.9 | +8.9 |
| Country | Barton Addison | 2,268 | 7.2 | +7.2 |
| Total formal votes | | 31,448 | 98.8 | |
| Informal votes | | 859 | 1.2 | |
| Turnout | | 32,307 | | |
Two-party-preferred result
| Nationalist | Herbert Pratten | | 76.0 | +3.4 |
| Labor | William Hutchison | | 26.0 | −3.4 |
| Nationalist hold | | Swing | +3.4 | |
