= 1958 Parramatta by-election =

A by-election was held for the Australian House of Representatives seat of Parramatta on 8 March 1958. This was triggered by the resignation of Liberal MP and Supply and Defence Production Minister Howard Beale to become Australian Ambassador to the United States.

The by-election was won by Liberal candidate Sir Garfield Barwick.

== Results ==
Parramatta by-election, 1958
Party	Candidate	Votes	%	±%
Liberal	Sir Garfield Barwick	22,826	54.8	−7.5
Labor	Dan Mahoney	17,931	43.0	+5.3
Independent	Augustus Fenwick	920	2.2	+2.2
Total formal votes		41,677	98.6	
Informal votes		610	1.4	
Turnout		42,287	86.9	
Two-party-preferred result
Liberal	Sir Garfield Barwick		55.9	−6.4
Labor	Dan Mahoney		44.1	+6.4
Liberal hold		Swing	−6.4	
