= Division of Parramatta =

Australian federal electoral division

Coordinates: 33.809°S 151.011°E

Parramatta Australian House of Representatives Division
- Interactive map of electorate boundaries from the 2025 federal election
- Created: 1901
- MP: Andrew Charlton
- Party: Labor
- Namesake: Parramatta
- Electors: 117,535 (2025)
- Area: 66 km^{2} (25.5 sq mi)
- Demographic: Inner metropolitan
Electorates around Parramatta:
Greenway	Mitchell	Berowra
McMahon	Parramatta	Bennelong
McMahon	Blaxland	Reid

The Division of Parramatta is an Australian electoral division in the state of New South Wales. It was created in 1900 and was one of the original 65 divisions contested at the first federal election. It is based in the western suburbs of Sydney. The current member, since the 2022 federal election, is Andrew Charlton, a member of the Australian Labor Party.

Parramatta is a diverse electorate with large immigrant communities from India and China, and has a higher than average university education rate according to the 2016 census. At the time of the 2022 Australian federal election, 12% of Parramatta's population possessed Chinese ancestry.

== Geography ==
Parramatta is based in the western suburbs of Sydney. Besides Parramatta, it includes Camellia, Carlingford, Constitution Hill, Dundas, Dundas Valley, Ermington, Harris Park, Mays Hill, North Parramatta, Oatlands, Pendle Hill, Rosehill, Rydalmere, Telopea, Wentworthville and Westmead; and parts of Clyde, Eastwood, Epping, Granville, Melrose Park, North Rocks, Northmead, Old Toongabbie, Seven Hills, South Wentworthville and Toongabbie.

Since 1984, federal electoral division boundaries in Australia have been determined at redistributions by a redistribution committee appointed by the Australian Electoral Commission. Redistributions occur for the boundaries of divisions in a particular state, and they occur every seven years, or sooner if a state's representation entitlement changes or when divisions of a state are malapportioned.

When the division was created in 1900, it covered all of north-west Sydney and the Blue Mountains. In 1906, it was shifted east to cover the Central Coast but lost all areas in the Blue Mountains. Within Sydney, it lost almost all areas west of Parramatta, but gained areas to the east up to Chatswood (but not inclusive). In 1913, it was significantly shrunk in area, losing all of Central Coast and most areas west of Hornsby. However, it expanded towards the south-east up to the Sydney Harbour at Waverton and eastwards up to the Middle Harbour at Northbridge, gaining North Shore areas such as Chatswood.

In 1922, the division was shifted back towards the west, losing all areas east of Ryde, and was significantly expanded to the west, regaining areas north-west, west and south-west of Parramatta. In 1933, it was significantly shrunk again, losing most of the areas in the west to the Division of Robertson. It also gained areas to the east in the Upper North Shore. It lost those Upper North Shore areas in 1949.

From 1949 until 1976, the division covered Parramatta and areas to the north-east in the Northern Suburbs such as Epping, Eastwood and Carlingford. In 1977, the boundaries were significantly altered to cover Parramatta and areas to the west instead, with the previous areas becoming the Division of Dundas. It regained some areas in the Northern Suburbs (up to Carlingford) in 1984 and 1992, the latter coinciding with the abolition of Dundas. Since then, the division covered a similar area, with minor boundary changes during redistributions.

== History ==
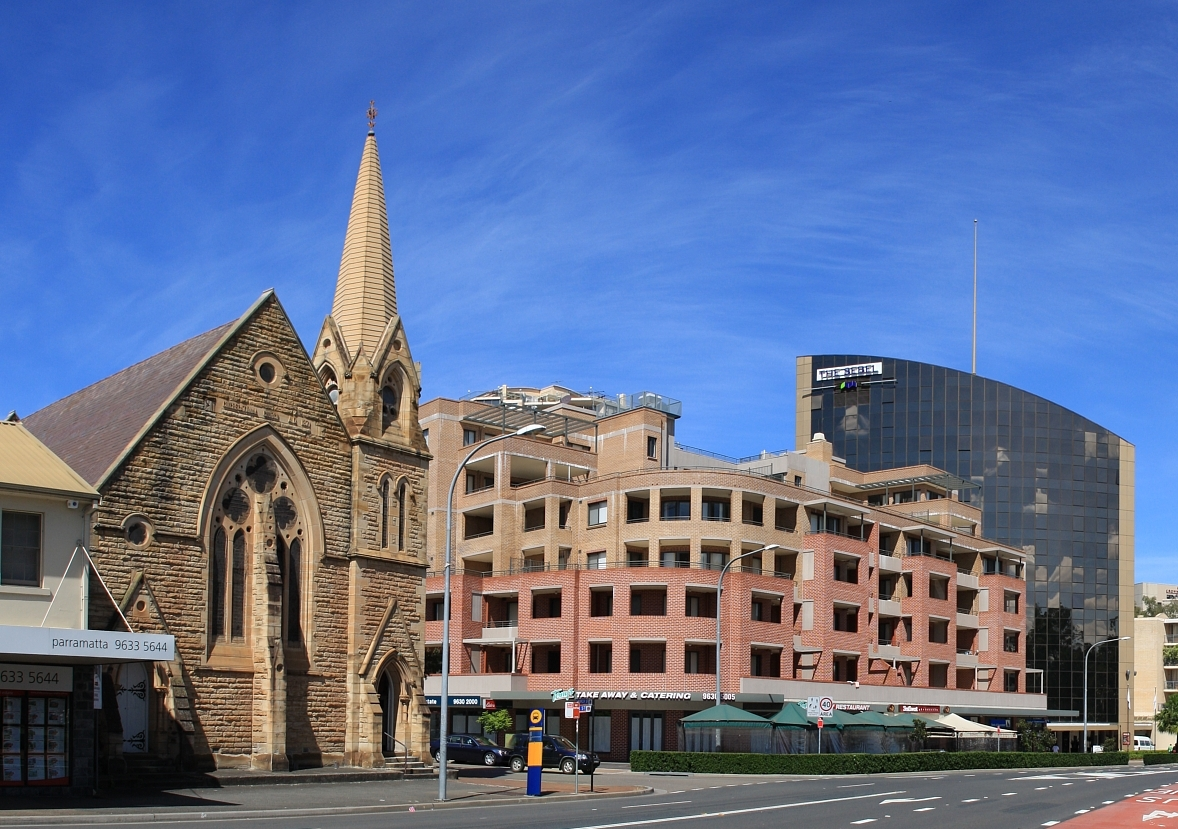
The suburb of Parramatta, the division's namesake

Parramatta was created in 1900 and was one of the original 65 divisions contested at the first federal election. It is named for the locality of Parramatta. The name Parramatta has been sourced to an Aboriginal word for the area. The Darug people had lived in the area for many generations, and regarded the area as a food bowl, rich in food from the river and forests. They called the area Baramada or Burramatta ("Parramatta") which means "the place where the eels lie down".

As originally created, it covered the outer northwestern suburbs of Sydney, though that city's dramatic growth made it an entirely urban seat after World War II. For most of the first seven decades after Federation, it included a large amount of conservative-leaning territory that usually swamped Parramatta itself, which has historically been a working-class area. As a result, the seat was held by the Liberals and their predecessors for all but one term from Federation until 1977.

A redistribution ahead of the 1977 election split Parramatta into two. The majority of the wealthier eastern portion became the comfortably safe Liberal seat of Dundas. The smaller western portion, including the bulk of the Parramatta LGA, became the core of a marginal Labor seat that retained the Parramatta name, as per Australian Electoral Commission guidelines that require the names of original Federation electorates to be preserved where possible. However, the reconfigured Parramatta was anchored in traditionally pro-Labor territory in western Sydney. Parramatta's Liberal incumbent, Phillip Ruddock, opted to follow most of his base into Dundas, allowing his 1975 challenger, John Brown to become only the second Labor member ever to win Parramatta.

Since then, it has been located between Labor's traditional heartland of western Sydney and the traditional Liberal stronghold of the North Shore. As a result, whenever the seat is redistributed, a shift of a few kilometres to the west or east can radically alter its political landscape.

For example, the 2006 redistribution shifted Parramatta from marginally Labor to notionally marginally Liberal (as defined by the Australian Electoral Commission). Nevertheless, as was widely expected at the 2007 federal election, the incumbent Labor member, Julie Owens, held the seat ahead of Liberal candidate Colin Robinson, a member of the Electrical Trades Union, with an increased majority.

Owens was subsequently re-elected at the 2010, 2013, 2016 elections, and 2019. Owens' win in the seat in 2004 marked the third time that the Liberals and their predecessors had won government without winning Parramatta, preceded by Brown's wins in 1975 and 1980.

Prominent members for Parramatta over the years have included (Sir) Joseph Cook, a former Prime Minister; (Sir) Garfield Barwick and Nigel Bowen, both of whom served as Attorney-General before moving to senior judicial position, Barwick as Chief Justice of the High Court. Ruddock, a former Attorney-General and Immigration Minister also represented the seat (though he was the member for Berowra by then); as did Brown, a former Sports Minister.

== Members ==
Image	Member	Party	Term	Notes
	Sir Joseph Cook (1860–1947)	Free Trade	30 March 1901 – 1906	Previously held the New South Wales Legislative Assembly seat of Hartley. Served as Opposition Leader from 1908 to 1909, in 1913, and from 1914 to 1917. Served as minister under Deakin and Hughes. Served as Prime Minister from 1913 to 1914. Resigned to become the High Commissioner to the United Kingdom
	Sir Joseph Cook (1860–1947)	Anti-Socialist	1906 – 26 May 1909	Previously held the New South Wales Legislative Assembly seat of Hartley. Served as Opposition Leader from 1908 to 1909, in 1913, and from 1914 to 1917. Served as minister under Deakin and Hughes. Served as Prime Minister from 1913 to 1914. Resigned to become the High Commissioner to the United Kingdom
	Sir Joseph Cook (1860–1947)	Liberal	26 May 1909 – 17 February 1917	Previously held the New South Wales Legislative Assembly seat of Hartley. Served as Opposition Leader from 1908 to 1909, in 1913, and from 1914 to 1917. Served as minister under Deakin and Hughes. Served as Prime Minister from 1913 to 1914. Resigned to become the High Commissioner to the United Kingdom
	Sir Joseph Cook (1860–1947)	Nationalist	17 February 1917 – 11 November 1921	Previously held the New South Wales Legislative Assembly seat of Hartley. Served as Opposition Leader from 1908 to 1909, in 1913, and from 1914 to 1917. Served as minister under Deakin and Hughes. Served as Prime Minister from 1913 to 1914. Resigned to become the High Commissioner to the United Kingdom
	Herbert Pratten (1865–1928)	Nationalist	10 December 1921 – 16 December 1922	Previously a member of the Senate. Transferred to the Division of Martin
	Eric Bowden (1871–1931)	Nationalist	16 December 1922 – 12 October 1929	Previously held the Division of Nepean. Served as minister under Bruce. Lost seat
	Albert Rowe (1872–1955)	Labor	12 October 1929 – 19 December 1931	Lost seat
	Sir Frederick Stewart (1884–1961)	United Australia	19 December 1931 – 21 February 1945	Served as minister under Lyons, Menzies and Fadden. Retired
	Sir Frederick Stewart (1884–1961)	Liberal	21 February 1945 – 16 August 1946	Served as minister under Lyons, Menzies and Fadden. Retired
	Howard Beale (1898–1983)	Liberal	28 September 1946 – 10 February 1958	Served as minister under Menzies. Resigned to become the Australian Ambassador to the United States
	Sir Garfield Barwick (1903–1997)	Liberal	8 March 1958 – 24 April 1964	Served as minister under Menzies. Resigned to become Chief Justice of the High Court
	Nigel Bowen (1911–1994)	Liberal	20 June 1964 – 11 July 1973	Served as minister under Holt, McEwen, Gorton and McMahon. Resigned to become a Judge of the Supreme Court of New South Wales
	Philip Ruddock (1943–)	Liberal	22 September 1973 – 10 December 1977	Transferred to the Division of Dundas
	John Brown (1931–)	Labor	10 December 1977 – 19 February 1990	Served as minister under Hawke. Retired
	Paul Elliott (1954–)	Labor	24 March 1990 – 2 March 1996	Lost seat
	Ross Cameron (1965–)	Liberal	2 March 1996 – 9 October 2004	Lost seat
	Julie Owens (1958–)	Labor	9 October 2004 – 11 April 2022	Retired
	Andrew Charlton (1978–)	Labor	21 May 2022 – present	Incumbent

== Election results ==
2025 Australian federal election: Parramatta
Party	Candidate	Votes	%	±%
Labor	Andrew Charlton	46,427	47.77	+7.63
Liberal	Katie Mullens	29,860	30.72	−6.10
Greens	Liz Tilly	11,766	12.11	+2.56
One Nation	Nicholas Matzen	2,653	2.73	+0.47
Trumpet of Patriots	Ganesh Loke	2,445	2.52	+2.51
Libertarian	Ben Somerson	1,522	1.57	−0.14
Independent	Tanya-lee Quinn	1,499	1.54	+1.54
Independent	Maa Malini	1,018	1.05	+1.05
Total formal votes		97,190	91.05	−1.20
Informal votes		9,556	8.95	+1.20
Turnout		106,746	90.85	+4.35
Two-party-preferred result
Labor	Andrew Charlton	60,790	62.55	+8.83
Liberal	Katie Mullens	36,400	37.45	−8.83
Labor hold		Swing	+8.83	

2022 Australian federal election: Parramatta
Party	Candidate	Votes	%	±%
Labor	Andrew Charlton	34,258	40.66	−4.42
Liberal	Maria Kovacic	29,492	35.00	−6.28
Greens	Phil Bradley	7,546	8.96	+1.72
United Australia	Julian Fayad	4,269	5.07	+2.49
Independent OLC	Steve Christou	2,982	3.54	+3.54
Animal Justice	Rohan Laxmanalal	2,397	2.84	+2.84
One Nation	Heather Freeman	2,011	2.39	+2.39
Liberal Democrats	Liza Tazewell	1,310	1.55	+1.55
Total formal votes		84,265	91.07	−0.56
Informal votes		8,259	8.93	+0.56
Turnout		92,524	87.73	−1.88
Two-party-preferred result
Labor	Andrew Charlton	45,980	54.57	+1.07
Liberal	Maria Kovacic	38,285	45.43	−1.07
Labor hold		Swing	+1.07	

Alluvial diagram for preference flows in the seat of Parramatta in the 2022 federal election. indicates at what stage the winning candidate had over 50% of the votes and was declared the winner.
