= Albert Rowe (politician) =

Australian politician (1872–1955)

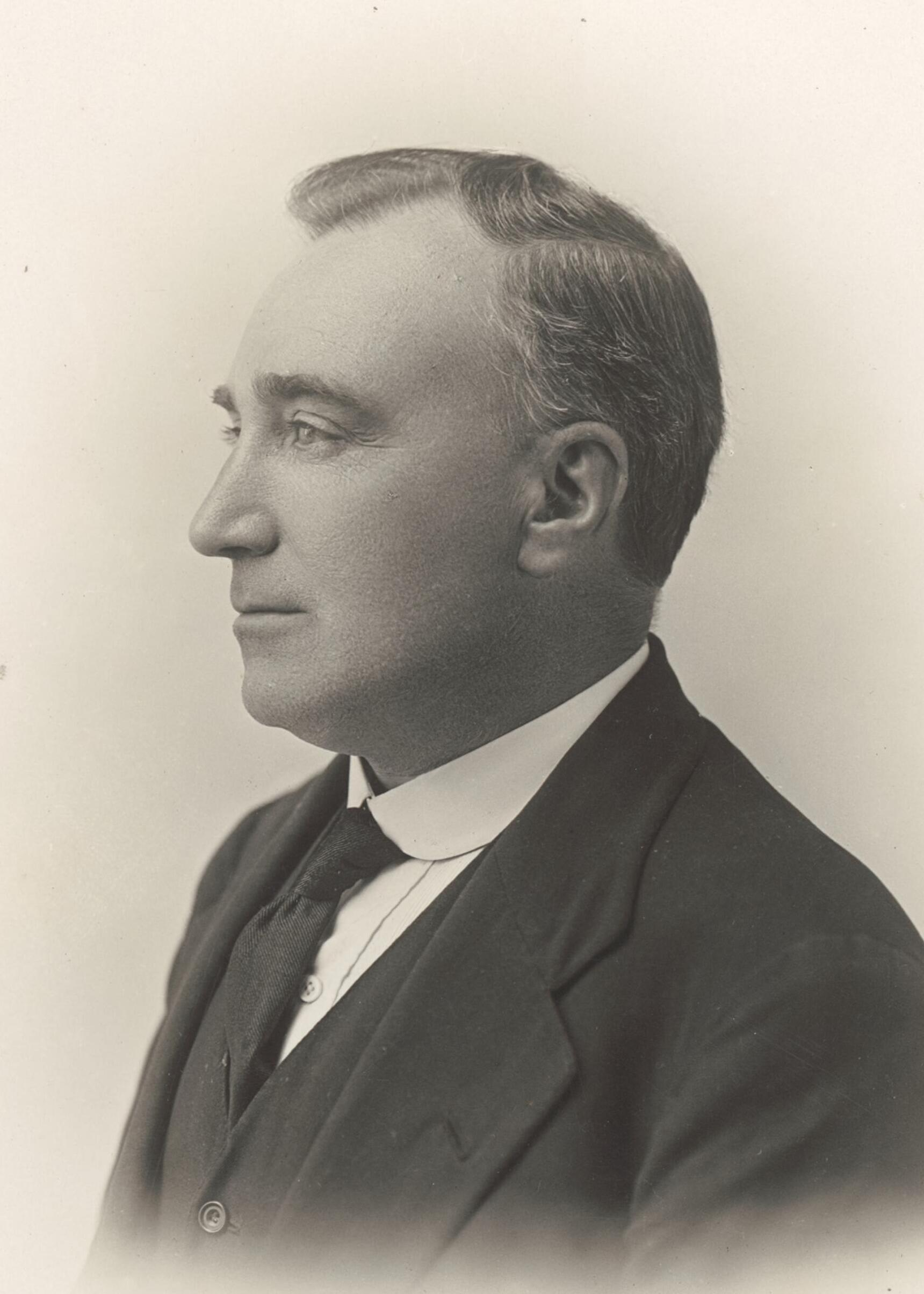

Member of the Australian Parliament for Parramatta
- In office 12 December 1929 – 19 December 1931
- Preceded by: Eric Bowden
- Succeeded by: Frederick Stewart

Personal details
- Born: 1872
- Died: 16 August 1955 (aged 82–83)
- Party: Australian Labor Party
- Occupation: politician and writer

Albert Edward Rowe (1872 – 16 August 1955) was an Australian politician. He won the seat of Parramatta for the Australian Labor Party in 1929, but was defeated by Frederick Stewart in 1931.

Prior to entering politics, Rowe worked in a printing-room, as a compositor, and at the time of his election as one of the readers on the staff of The Sun. He was also a member of the board of the Printing Industry Union and the secretary of the Sylvania Progress Association. His election in 1929 was unexpected: the local newspaper wrote at the time that Parramatta had "always been looked upon as a National stronghold".

Parliament of Australia
Preceded by Eric Bowden	Member for Parramatta; 1929–1931	Succeeded by Frederick Stewart
