= Richard Orchard =

Australian businessman and politician

The Honourable Richard Orchard CBE
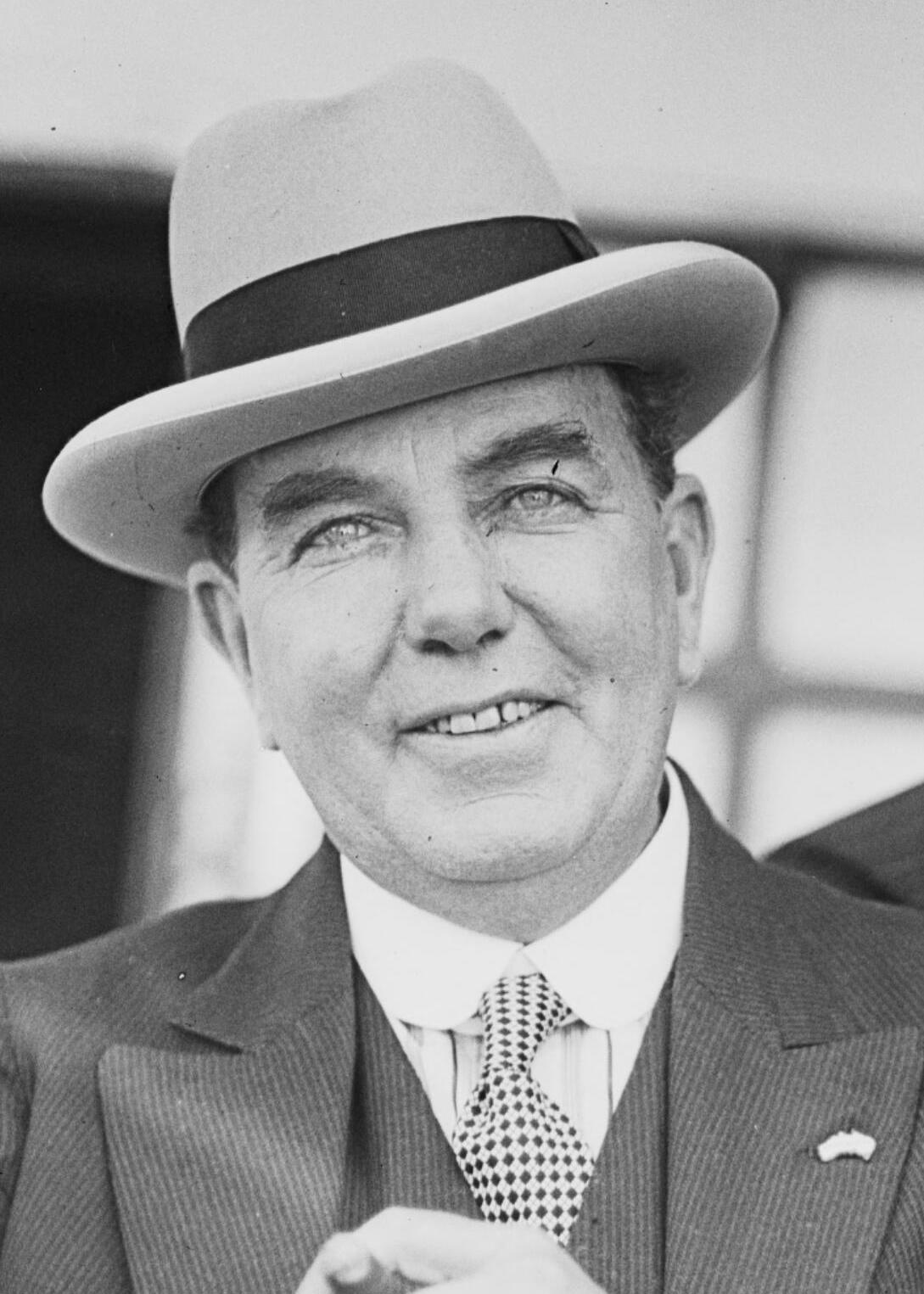

Member of the Australian Parliament for Nepean
- In office 31 May 1913 – 3 November 1919
- Preceded by: George Cann
- Succeeded by: Eric Bowden

Personal details
- Born: 14 October 1871 Maryborough, Victoria, Australia
- Died: 24 July 1942 (aged 70) Darling Point, New South Wales, Australia
- Party: Liberal (1913–17); Nationalist (1917–19)
- Spouse: Maria Annie Austen (m. 1895)
- Occupation: Watchmaker and jeweller

Richard Beaumont Orchard CBE (14 October 1871 – 24 July 1942) was an Australian businessman and politician. He was a successful watchmaker and jeweller, with premises on George Street, Sydney. He served in the House of Representatives from 1913 to 1919, representing the Division of Nepean, and was an honorary minister in the Fourth Hughes Ministry.

== Early life ==
Orchard was born at Cockatoo, near Maryborough, Victoria, to Cornish parents John Henry Orchard, a blacksmith, and his wife Alicia, née Thomas. In the 1870s he moved with his family to Sydney. He spent four years as a travelling jewellery salesman in rural New South Wales. In 1895, when he married Maria Annie Austen, he was a photographer living in the Sydney suburb of Ultimo. He later became a watchmaker and established a jewellery store in George Street, Sydney in 1901, which became a public company in 1913 as R. B. Orchard Ltd.

== Parliament ==
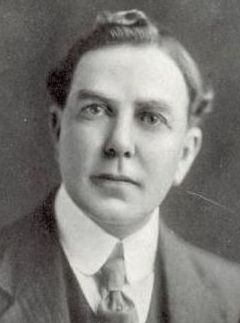
Orchard during his political career

Orchard ran unsuccessfully for the Sydney Municipal Council in 1909 and the New South Wales Legislative Assembly seat of Hawkesbury in 1911. He won the Australian House of Representatives seat of Nepean at the 1913 election for the Commonwealth Liberal Party. He joined Billy Hughes' Nationalist government in 1917 and was appointed an Honorary Minister with responsibility for recruiting from March 1918 to January 1919. He retired from politics at the November 1919 election.

== Later life ==
Orchard was appointed as a Commander of the Order of the British Empire in 1920. He ran unsuccessfully as a Nationalist for the seat of East Sydney at the 1925 election, and for the Senate in 1928 election. He was a commissioner of the Australian Broadcasting Commission from its foundation in 1932 until 1939. He died in the Sydney suburb of Darling Point survived by his wife, a son and three daughters.

== Notes ==
Parliament of Australia
Preceded by George Cann	Member for Nepean; 1913 – 1919	Succeeded by Eric Bowden
