= Eric Bowden =

Australian solicitor and politician (1876–1955)

The Honourable Eric Bowden
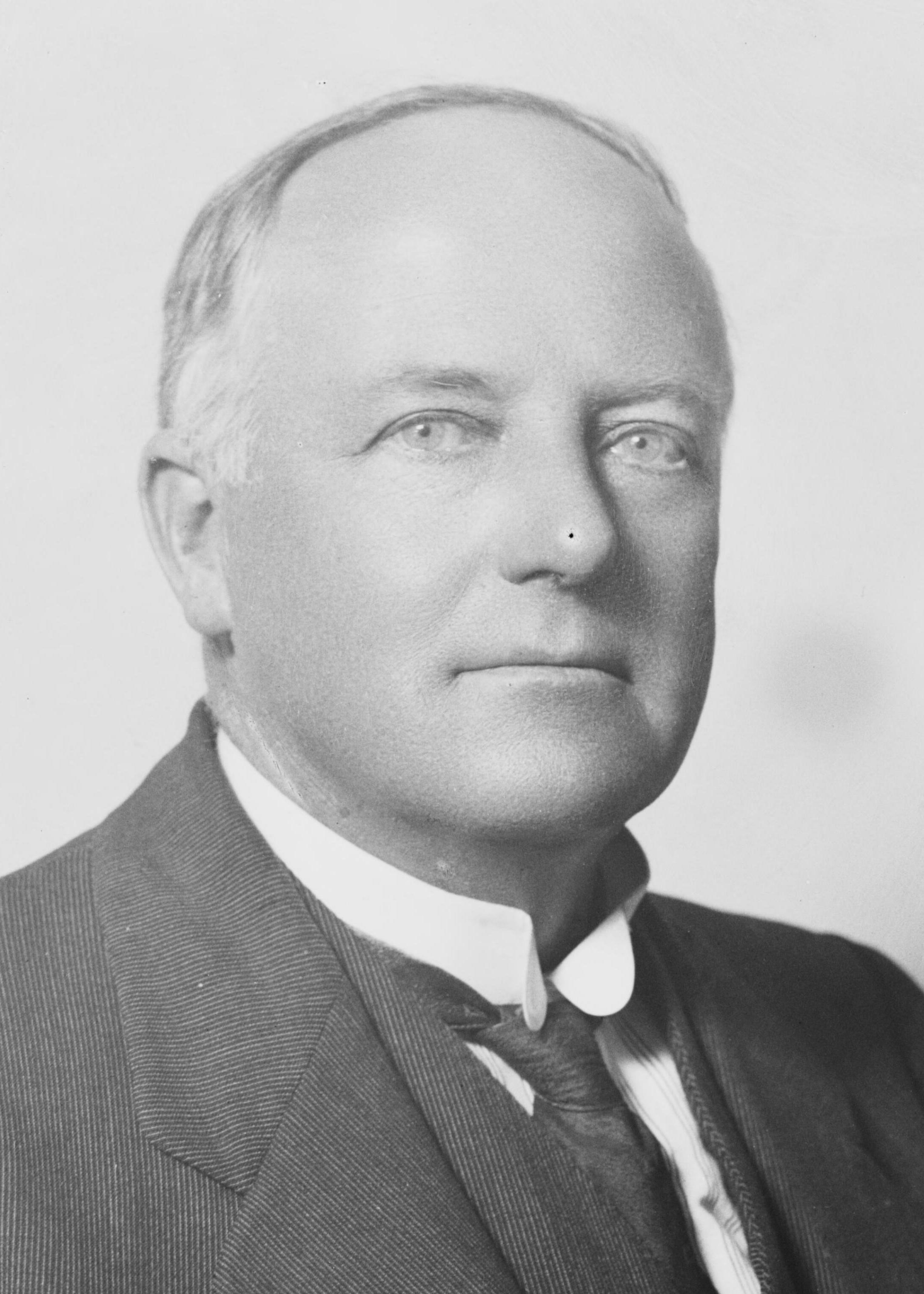

Minister for Defence
- In office 9 February 1923 – 16 January 1925
- Prime Minister: Stanley Bruce
- Preceded by: Walter Massy-Greene
- Succeeded by: Neville Howse

Member of the Australian Parliament for Parramatta
- In office 16 December 1922 – 12 October 1929
- Preceded by: Herbert Pratten
- Succeeded by: Albert Rowe

Member of the Australian Parliament for Nepean
- In office 13 December 1919 – 16 December 1922
- Preceded by: Richard Orchard
- Succeeded by: Seat abolished
- In office 12 December 1906 – 13 April 1910
- Preceded by: New seat
- Succeeded by: George Cann

Personal details
- Born: 30 September 1871 Parramatta, New South Wales, Australia
- Died: 13 February 1931 (aged 59) Parramatta, New South Wales, Australia
- Party: Anti-Socialist (1906–09); Liberal (1909–16); Nationalist (1916–29)
- Spouse: Reinetta May Murphy
- Education: Newington College (1882-1884); Sydney Boys High School (1888–92)
- Occupation: Solicitor

Eric Kendall Bowden (30 September 1871 – 13 February 1931) was an Australian politician. A solicitor by profession, he served as Minister for Defence from 1923 to 1925, under Prime Minister Stanley Bruce. He was a member of the House of Representatives from 1906 to 1910 and 1919 to 1929.

== Early life ==
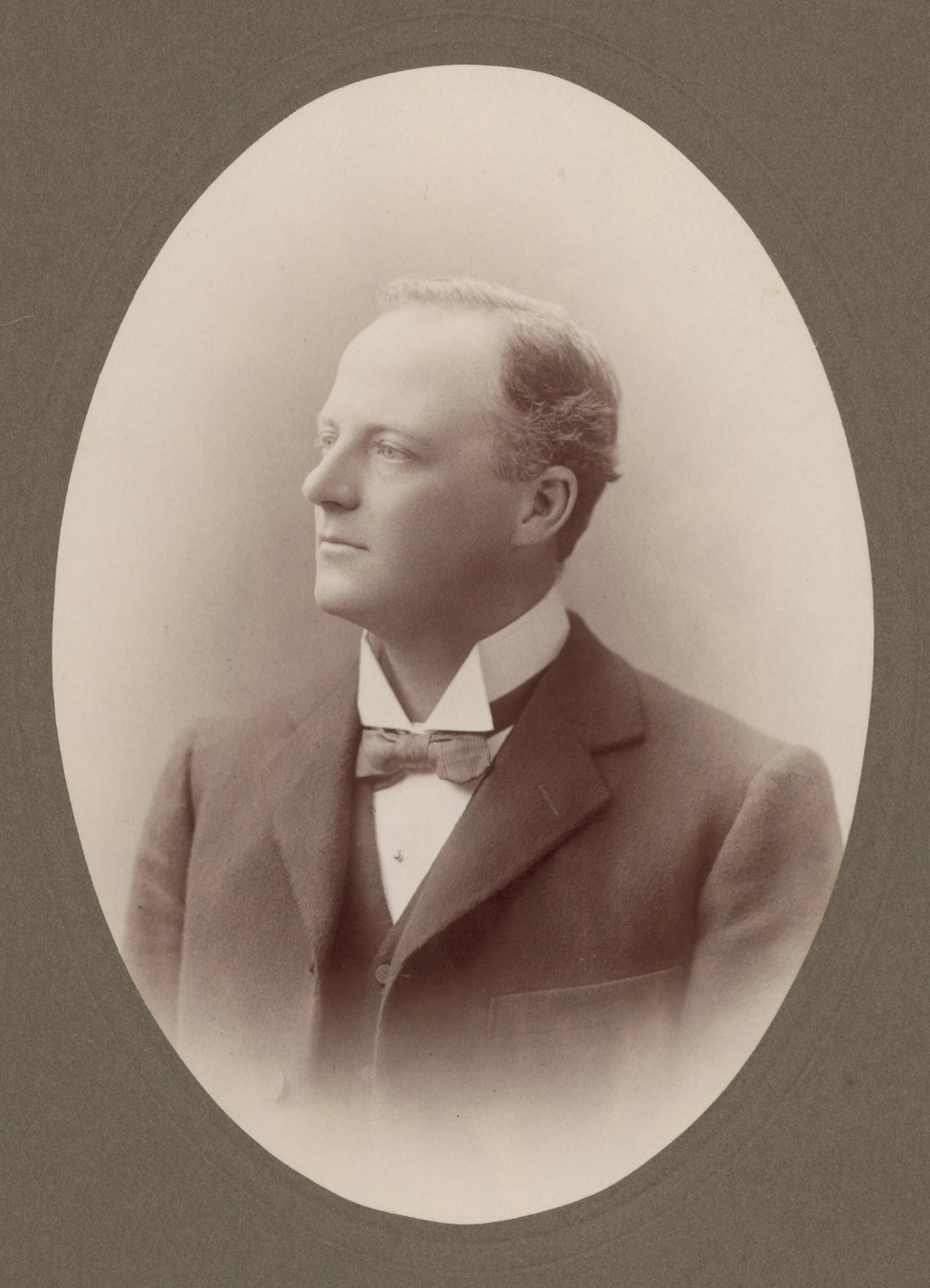
A younger Bowden

Bowden was born in Parramatta, New South Wales, the second son of Sarah Anne (née Smith) and John Ebenezer Bowden. His great-grandfather Thomas Bowden had arrived in the colony in 1812 and became one of Parramatta's earliest schoolmasters. Educated at Newington College (1882-1884) and Sydney Boys High School (1888–92), Bowden qualified as a solicitor in 1894 after serving articles with his father. Four years he later married Reinetta May Murphy. In 1902, he took possession of Endrim, a former clergy house previously owned by his father. It is now heritage listed.

== Political career ==
Bowden was an alderman on the Granville Borough Council from 1904 to 1907. He was elected to federal parliament at the 1906 federal election, aged 34, winning the newly created Division of Nepean for the Anti-Socialist Party. He was defeated in 1910 after a single term, losing to the Australian Labor Party (ALP) candidate George Cann.

At the 1919 election, Bowden recaptured Nepean as a Nationalist, replacing the retiring member Richard Orchard. He switched to the Division of Parramatta at the 1922 election.

=== Minister for Defence ===
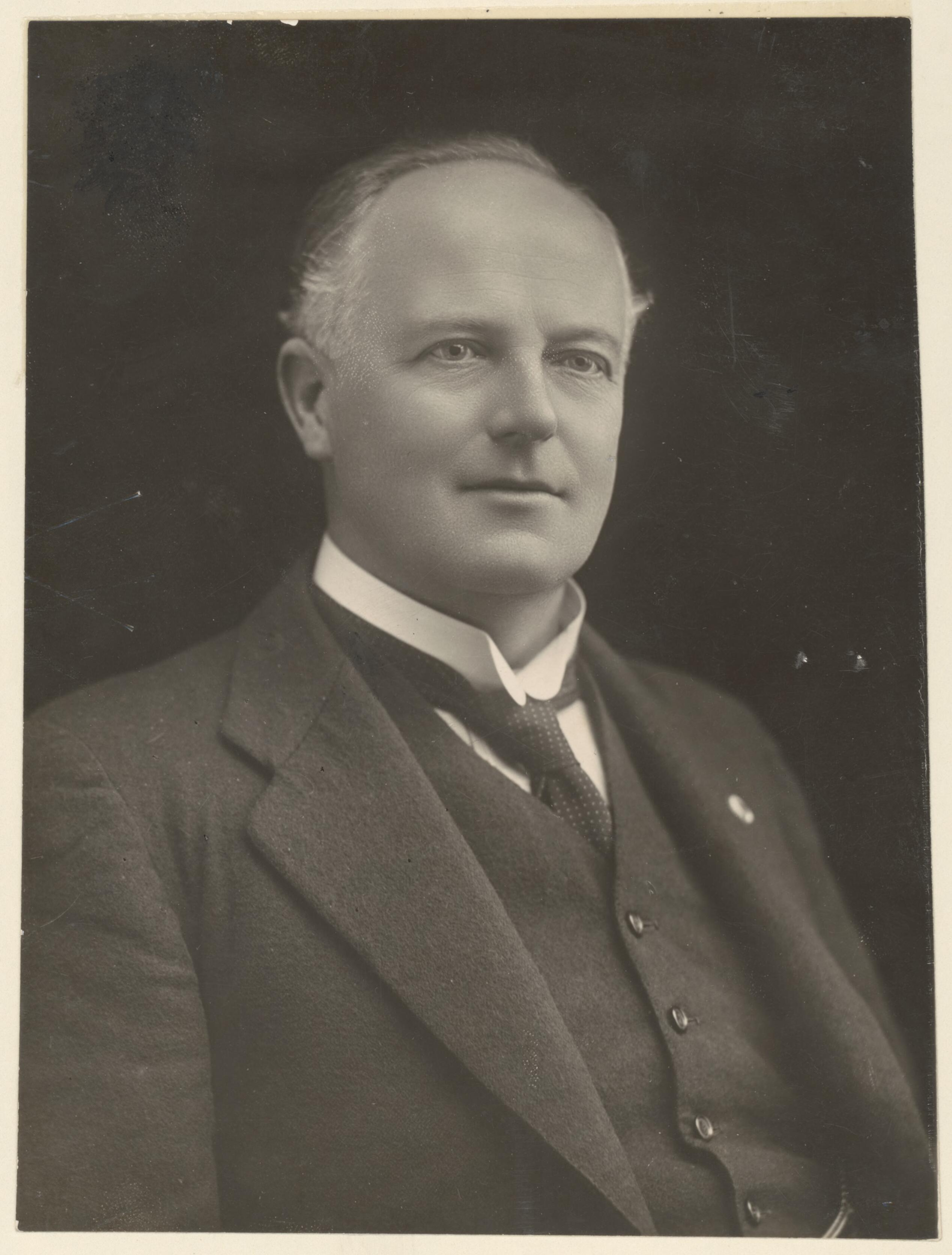
Eric Bowden

Stanley Bruce replaced Billy Hughes as prime minister in February 1923, and appointed Bowden as Minister for Defence in the new ministry. His appointment occasioned some surprise, as he had no military experience, was not regarded as a strong speaker, and had shown little interest in defence matters.

In 1923, Bowden oversaw the passage of the Air Force Act 1923, the major governing act for the Royal Australian Air Force (RAAF) that had been established two years earlier. He also oversaw the introduction of the government's five-year defence programme, which provided for the creation of a cruiser and submarine force. He argued for greater funding for defence to counter the perceived threat of Japan, but also allowed a reduction in funding for the military and naval colleges.

Bowden resigned from the ministry in January 1925, citing ill health.

== Final years ==
In his last terms in parliament, Bowden served on the joint select committee on electoral law and as a member of the royal commission into the Constitution. He lost his seat at the 1929 election, which saw Labor return to government.

Bowden suffered from chronic respiratory disease in his last years and was also in financial difficulties, forcing him to subdivide the land around Endrim. He died suddenly on 13 February 1931 at his home in Parramatta.

Political offices
Preceded by Walter Massy-Greene	Minister for Defence; 1923–1925	Succeeded by Neville Howse
Parliament of Australia
New division	Member for Nepean; 1906–1910	Succeeded by George Cann
Preceded by Richard Orchard	Member for Nepean; 1919–1922	Division abolished
Preceded by Herbert Pratten	Member for Parramatta; 1922–1929	Succeeded by Albert Rowe
