= Division of Nepean =

Former Australian federal electoral division

Nepean Australian House of Representatives Division
- Created: 1906
- Abolished: 1922
- Namesake: Evan Nepean

The Division of Nepean was an Australian Electoral Division in the state of New South Wales. It was located in the western suburbs of Sydney. It originally covered the suburbs of Granville, Lithgow and Penrith. After the redistribution of 27 February 1913 it also included the suburb of Homebush.

The Division was named for the Nepean River, which itself was named after British politician Evan Nepean. It was proclaimed at the redistribution of 13 July 1906, and was first contested at the 1906 Federal election. It was abolished at the redistribution of 13 September 1922 and divided between six electorates: Macquarie, Martin, Parramatta, Reid, Robertson and Werriwa.

== Members ==
Image	Member	Party	Term	Notes
	Eric Bowden (1871–1931)	Anti-Socialist	12 December 1906 – 26 May 1909	Lost seat. Later elected to Nepean in 1919
	Eric Bowden (1871–1931)	Liberal	26 May 1909 – 13 April 1910	Lost seat. Later elected to Nepean in 1919
	George Cann (1871–1948)	Labor	13 April 1910 – 31 May 1913	Lost seat. Later elected to the New South Wales Legislative Assembly seat of Canterbury in 1914
	Richard Orchard (1871–1942)	Liberal	31 May 1913 – 17 February 1917	Served as minister under Hughes. Retired
	Richard Orchard (1871–1942)	Nationalist	17 February 1917 – 3 November 1919	Served as minister under Hughes. Retired
	Eric Bowden (1871–1931)	Nationalist	13 December 1919 – 16 December 1922	Elected to the Division of Parramatta after Nepean was abolished in 1922

== Election results ==
1919 Australian federal election: Nepean
Party	Candidate	Votes	%	±%
Nationalist	Eric Bowden	20,630	57.1	−3.4
Labor	Con Wallace	15,524	42.9	+3.4
Total formal votes		36,154	97.8	
Informal votes		814	2.2	
Turnout		36,968	68.6	
Nationalist hold		Swing	−3.4	
