= Electoral results for the Division of Grayndler =

Results of elections in Sydney, Australia

This is a list of electoral results for the Division of Grayndler in Australian federal elections from the electorate's creation in 1949 until the present. Grayndler is currently held by Anthony Albanese, the Prime Minister of Australia and the leader of the Australian Labor Party.

== Members ==
Member	Party	Term
Fred Daly	Labor	1949–1975
Tony Whitlam	Labor	1975–1977
Frank Stewart	Labor	1977–1979
Leo McLeay	Labor	1979–1993
Jeannette McHugh	Labor	1993–1996
Anthony Albanese	Labor	1996–present

== Election results ==
=== Elections in the 2020s ===
==== 2025 ====
2025 Australian federal election: Grayndler
Party	Candidate	Votes	%	±%
Labor	Anthony Albanese	59,364	53.54	+0.84
Greens	Hannah Thomas	27,847	25.11	+4.18
Liberal	David Smallbone	15,867	14.31	−3.54
One Nation	Rodney Smith	3,505	3.16	+0.87
Independent	David Bradbury	2,566	2.31	+2.31
Trumpet of Patriots	Cheri Burrell	1,729	1.56	+1.56
Total formal votes		110,878	95.88	+0.90
Informal votes		4,763	4.12	−0.90
Turnout		115,641	92.11	+2.59
Notional two-party-preferred count
Labor	Anthony Albanese	88,897	80.18	+3.55
Liberal	David Smallbone	21,981	19.82	−3.55
Two-candidate-preferred result
Labor	Anthony Albanese	74,138	66.86	+2.89
Greens	Hannah Thomas	36,740	33.14	−2.89
Labor hold		Swing	+2.89	

==== 2022 ====
2022 Australian federal election: Grayndler
Party	Candidate	Votes	%	±%
Labor	Anthony Albanese	50,723	53.63	+2.77
Greens	Rachael Jacobs	20,846	22.04	−0.51
Liberal	Ben Zhang	15,111	15.98	−5.78
United Australia	David Smith	2,101	2.22	+1.01
Independent	Sarina Kilham	1,973	2.09	+2.09
One Nation	Paul Henselin	1,449	1.53	+1.53
Fusion	James Haggerty	1,222	1.29	+1.29
Animal Justice	Michael Dello-Iacovo	1,148	1.21	+1.21
Total formal votes		94,573	95.47	−0.28
Informal votes		4,483	4.53	+0.28
Turnout		99,056	90.11	−1.22
Notional two-party-preferred count
Labor	Anthony Albanese	74,571	78.85	+5.02
Liberal	Ben Zhang	20,002	21.15	−5.02
Two-candidate-preferred result
Labor	Anthony Albanese	63,413	67.05	+0.75
Greens	Rachael Jacobs	31,160	32.95	−0.75
Labor hold		Swing	+0.75	

Alluvial diagram for preference flows in the seat of Grayndler in the 2022 federal election. The winning candidate got over 50% of first preference votes, so this alluvial diagram is indicative only, and preference flows were not used to determine the final result. The preference flows were used to determine the two-candidate-preferred.

=== Elections in the 2010s ===
==== 2019 ====
2019 Australian federal election: Grayndler
Party	Candidate	Votes	%	±%
Labor	Anthony Albanese	48,728	50.86	+4.79
Greens	Jim Casey	21,607	22.55	+0.31
Liberal	Derek Henderson	20,846	21.76	−1.55
Science	Majella Morello	2,613	2.73	+1.41
United Australia	Paris King-Orsborn	1,155	1.21	+1.21
Christian Democrats	Gui Dong Cao	865	0.90	−0.33
Total formal votes		95,814	95.75	+2.48
Informal votes		4,258	4.25	−2.48
Turnout		100,072	91.33	+2.05
Notional two-party-preferred count
Labor	Anthony Albanese	70,739	73.83	+1.47
Liberal	Derek Henderson	25,075	26.17	−1.47
Two-candidate-preferred result
Labor	Anthony Albanese	63,529	66.30	+0.48
Greens	Jim Casey	32,285	33.70	−0.48
Labor hold		Swing	+0.48	

==== 2016 ====
2016 Australian federal election: Grayndler
Party	Candidate	Votes	%	±%
Labor	Anthony Albanese	40,503	46.07	−0.40
Liberal	David Van Gogh	20,498	23.31	−3.13
Greens	Jim Casey	19,555	22.24	+0.17
Animal Justice	Emma Hurst	1,831	2.08	+2.08
Science	Meow-Ludo Meow-Meow	1,157	1.32	+1.32
Christian Democrats	Jamie Elvy	1,085	1.23	−0.43
Drug Law Reform	Chris Hindi	1,029	1.17	+1.17
Sex Party	Pat Sheil	934	1.06	+1.06
Renewable Energy	Chris McLachlan	537	0.61	+0.61
Cyclists	Noel McFarlane	460	0.52	+0.52
Socialist Equality	Oscar Grenfell	333	0.38	+0.38
Total formal votes		87,922	93.27	−0.48
Informal votes		6,343	6.73	+0.48
Turnout		94,265	89.28	−2.37
Notional two-party-preferred count
Labor	Anthony Albanese	63,616	72.36	+3.60
Liberal	David Van Gogh	24,306	27.64	−3.60
Two-candidate-preferred result
Labor	Anthony Albanese	57,872	65.82	−4.52
Greens	Jim Casey	30,050	34.18	+34.18
Labor hold		Swing	N/A	

==== 2013 ====
2013 Australian federal election: Grayndler
Party	Candidate	Votes	%	±%
Labor	Anthony Albanese	42,009	47.20	+1.11
Liberal	Cedric Spencer	21,981	24.70	+0.46
Greens	Hall Greenland	20,498	23.03	−2.87
Christian Democrats	Joshua Green	1,828	2.05	+2.05
Palmer United	Mohanadas Balasingham	1,522	1.71	+1.71
Bullet Train	Joel Scully	1,171	1.32	+1.32
Total formal votes		89,009	93.00	+0.08
Informal votes		6,699	7.00	−0.08
Turnout		95,708	91.32	+0.01
Two-party-preferred result
Labor	Anthony Albanese	62,613	70.34	−0.29
Liberal	Cedric Spencer	26,396	29.66	+0.29
Labor hold		Swing	−0.29	

==== 2010 ====
2010 Australian federal election: Grayndler
Party	Candidate	Votes	%	±%
Labor	Anthony Albanese	38,369	46.09	−9.37
Greens	Sam Byrne	21,555	25.90	+7.26
Liberal	Alexander Dore	20,178	24.24	+3.30
Democrats	Perry Garofani	1,074	1.29	−0.38
Socialist Equality	James Cogan	1,041	1.25	+0.86
Socialist Alliance	Pip Hinman	1,022	1.23	+1.18
Total formal votes		83,239	92.92	−1.10
Informal votes		6,344	7.08	+1.10
Turnout		89,583	91.31	−3.00
Two-party-preferred result
Labor	Anthony Albanese	58,789	70.63	−4.22
Liberal	Alexander Dore	24,450	29.37	+4.22
Two-candidate-preferred result
Labor	Anthony Albanese	45,138	54.23	−20.62
Greens	Sam Byrne	38,101	45.77	+45.77
Labor hold		Swing	N/A	

=== Elections in the 2000s ===
==== 2007 ====
2007 Australian federal election: Grayndler
Party	Candidate	Votes	%	±%
Labor	Anthony Albanese	46,509	55.47	+4.77
Liberal	Daniel Caffery	17,485	20.86	−4.77
Greens	Saeed Khan	15,675	18.70	−1.34
Democrats	Jeffrey Gabriel	1,407	1.68	−0.35
Socialist Alliance	Pip Hinman	1,394	1.66	+0.45
Christian Democrats	Ehab Hennien	1,042	1.24	+1.06
Socialist Equality	Patrick O'Connor	328	0.39	+0.39
Total formal votes		83,840	94.02	−0.22
Informal votes		5,333	5.98	+0.22
Turnout		89,173	93.82	+0.59
Two-party-preferred result
Labor	Anthony Albanese	62,821	74.93	+3.74
Liberal	Daniel Caffery	21,019	25.07	−3.74
Labor hold		Swing	+3.74	

==== 2004 ====
2004 Australian federal election: Grayndler
Party	Candidate	Votes	%	±%
Labor	Anthony Albanese	38,634	51.18	+2.03
Liberal	Stephanie Kokkolis	18,347	24.31	+1.38
Greens	Philip Myers	15,914	21.08	+8.02
Democrats	Jen Harrison	1,579	2.09	−7.03
Socialist Alliance	Sue Johnson	1010	1.34	+1.34
Total formal votes		75,484	94.58	+1.14
Informal votes		4,322	5.42	−1.14
Turnout		79,806	92.94	+0.99
Two-party-preferred result
Labor	Anthony Albanese	54,798	72.60	+1.31
Liberal	Stephanie Kokkolis	20,686	27.40	−1.31
Labor hold		Swing	+1.31	

==== 2001 ====
2001 Australian federal election: Grayndler
Party	Candidate	Votes	%	±%
Labor	Anthony Albanese	36,379	49.15	−6.56
Liberal	Brett Kenworthy	16,971	22.93	+2.16
Greens	Sylvia Hale	9,666	13.06	+8.42
Democrats	Matthew Baird	6,750	9.12	+3.34
One Nation	Kane O'Connor	1,485	2.01	−1.06
Unity	Guang Hua Wan	1,009	1.36	−3.14
	Sue Johnson	954	1.29	+1.29
Christian Democrats	Chris Herden	805	1.09	+0.35
Total formal votes		74,019	93.44	−1.45
Informal votes		5,193	6.56	+1.45
Turnout		79,212	92.52	
Two-party-preferred result
Labor	Anthony Albanese	52,770	71.29	−1.03
Liberal	Brett Kenworthy	21,249	28.71	+1.03
Labor hold		Swing	−1.03	

=== Elections in the 1990s ===
==== 1998 ====
1998 Australian federal election: Grayndler
Party	Candidate	Votes	%	±%
Labor	Anthony Albanese	41,971	55.67	+5.19
Liberal	Michael Armani	15,628	20.73	−2.87
Democrats	Katherine Cummings	4,301	5.70	+0.72
Unity	Ning Gao	3,621	4.80	+4.80
Greens	Sean Roberts	3,373	4.47	−0.11
No Aircraft Noise	Sylvia Hale	2,816	3.74	−9.87
One Nation	Warren Webb	2,342	3.11	+3.11
Christian Democrats	Michael Robinson	630	0.84	−0.19
Democratic Socialist	Michael Karadjis	535	0.71	+0.71
Natural Law	John Ryder	177	0.23	−0.20
Total formal votes		75,394	94.79	+0.23
Informal votes		4,142	5.21	−0.23
Turnout		79,536	92.59	−2.65
Two-party-preferred result
Labor	Anthony Albanese	54,528	72.32	+5.95
Liberal	Michael Armani	20,866	27.68	−5.95
Labor hold		Swing	+5.95	

==== 1996 ====
1996 Australian federal election: Grayndler
Party	Candidate	Votes	%	±%
Labor	Anthony Albanese	37,623	50.48	−12.57
Liberal	Morris Mansour	17,584	23.59	+0.42
No Aircraft Noise	Kevin Butler	10,142	13.61	+13.61
Democrats	David Mendelssohn	3,715	4.98	+2.20
Greens	Jenny Ryde	3,419	4.59	−1.45
Call to Australia	Alex Sharah	766	1.03	+0.16
Independent	Kate Butler	751	1.01	+1.01
Natural Law	Tom Haynes	321	0.43	−0.24
	Ron Poulsen	208	0.28	+0.28
Total formal votes		74,529	95.24	−0.86
Informal votes		4,286	5.44	+0.86
Turnout		78,815	95.24	+1.54
Two-party-preferred result
Labor	Anthony Albanese	48,910	66.38	−6.43
Liberal	Morris Mansour	24,776	33.62	+6.43
Labor hold		Swing	−6.43	

==== 1993 ====
1993 Australian federal election: Grayndler
Party	Candidate	Votes	%	±%
Labor	Jeannette McHugh	45,605	63.06	+10.79
Liberal	Kevin Robinson	16,761	23.17	−1.09
Greens	Paul Fitzgerald	4,363	6.03	+6.03
Democrats	Peter Markham	2,012	2.78	−8.09
Independent	Jack Shanahan	1,395	1.93	+1.93
Call to Australia	Clay Wilson	625	0.86	−0.42
Independent	Marnie Kennedy	545	0.75	+0.75
Independent	Lee Pepper	535	0.74	+0.45
Natural Law	Peter Johnston	485	0.67	+0.67
Total formal votes		72,325	95.42	+1.28
Informal votes		3,468	4.58	−1.28
Turnout		75,793	93.69	
Two-party-preferred result
Labor	Jeannette McHugh	52,589	72.81	+5.34
Liberal	Kevin Robinson	19,638	27.19	−5.34
Labor hold		Swing	+5.34	

==== 1990 ====
1990 Australian federal election: Grayndler
Party	Candidate	Votes	%	±%
Labor	Leo McLeay	30,515	52.0	−0.7
Liberal	Diana Bennett	15,932	27.2	−7.7
Democrats	Peter Hennessy	5,447	9.3	+3.2
Independent	Galeb Adra	2,481	4.2	+4.2
Independent	Bruce Welch	1,766	3.0	+3.0
Call to Australia	Clay Wilson	870	1.5	+1.5
Socialist	Habib Fares	686	1.2	+1.2
Independent	Lee Pepper	354	0.6	+0.6
Independent	Paul Urban	353	0.6	+0.6
New Australia	George der Mattosian	270	0.5	+0.5
Total formal votes		58,674	93.0	
Informal votes		4,418	7.0	
Turnout		63,092	93.1	
Two-party-preferred result
Labor	Leo McLeay	36,959	63.3	+3.6
Liberal	Diana Bennett	21,473	36.7	−3.6
Labor hold		Swing	+3.6	

=== Elections in the 1980s ===
==== 1987 ====
1987 Australian federal election: Grayndler
Party	Candidate	Votes	%	±%
Labor	Leo McLeay	31,240	52.7	−7.6
Liberal	Khalil Tartak	20,698	34.9	+5.6
Democrats	Peter Hennessy	3,602	6.1	−0.7
Independent	Jack Shanahan	2,108	3.6	+3.6
Independent	Nick Papanikitas	1,686	2.8	+2.8
Total formal votes		59,334	92.4	
Informal votes		5,601	8.6	
Turnout		64,935	91.2	
Two-party-preferred result
Labor	Leo McLeay	35,395	59.7	−5.2
Liberal	Keith Tartak	23,883	40.3	+5.2
Labor hold		Swing	−5.2	

==== 1984 ====
1984 Australian federal election: Grayndler
Party	Candidate	Votes	%	±%
Labor	Leo McLeay	34,847	60.3	+5.5
Liberal	John Marsden-Lynch	16,908	29.3	−4.5
Democrats	Peter Hennessy	3,090	5.4	+2.3
Socialist Workers	Christine Broi	2,909	5.0	+4.3
Total formal votes		57,754	88.6	
Informal votes		7,418	11.4	
Turnout		65,172	91.7	
Two-party-preferred result
Labor	Leo McLeay	37,464	64.9	+1.8
Liberal	John Marsden-Lynch	20,262	35.1	−1.8
Labor hold		Swing	+1.8	

==== 1983 ====
1983 Australian federal election: Grayndler
Party	Candidate	Votes	%	±%
Labor	Leo McLeay	34,679	58.9	+1.4
Liberal	Edward James	17,508	29.7	−5.0
Socialist	David Gibson	3,434	5.8	+3.4
Democrats	Albert Jarman	1,831	3.1	−0.1
Communist	Joseph Owens	1,008	1.7	+1.7
Socialist Workers	Michael Karadjis	432	0.7	+0.7
Total formal votes		58,892	95.8	
Informal votes		2,564	4.2	
Turnout		61,456	92.9	
Two-party-preferred result
Labor	Leo McLeay	37,208	63.2	−0.3
Liberal	Edward James	21,684	36.8	+0.3
Labor hold		Swing	−0.3	

==== 1980 ====
1980 Australian federal election: Grayndler
Party	Candidate	Votes	%	±%
Labor	Leo McLeay	34,029	57.5	−0.2
Liberal	George Dryden	20,538	34.7	+1.3
Democrats	Albert Jarman	1,894	3.2	−4.0
Socialist	Justin Walsh	1,405	2.4	+0.7
Socialist Labour	Derek Mortimer	1,273	2.2	+2.2
Total formal votes		59,139	95.9	
Informal votes		2,513	4.1	
Turnout		61,652	92.6	
Two-party-preferred result
Labor	Leo McLeay		63.5	+1.3
Liberal	Keith Tartak		36.5	−1.3
Labor hold		Swing	+1.3	

=== Elections in the 1970s ===
==== 1979 by-election ====
1979 Grayndler by-election
Party	Candidate	Votes	%	±%
Labor	Leo McLeay	30,764	61.8	+4.1
Liberal	Vassil Vassiliou	12,161	24.4	−9.0
Democrats	Stephen Kirkham	1,848	3.7	−3.5
Voice of the Elderly	Stanley Duncan	1,845	3.7	+3.7
Independent	Charles Bellchambers	1,051	2.1	+2.1
Australian National Alliance	Frank Salter	863	1.7	+0.0
Socialist	Frank Vouros	665	1.3	−0.4
Socialist Workers	Juanita Keig	591	1.2	+1.2
Total formal votes		49,788	94.7	
Informal votes		2,806	5.3	
Turnout		52,594	77.7	
Two-party-preferred result
Labor	Leo McLeay		69.2	+7.0
Liberal	Vassil Vassiliou		30.8	−7.0
Labor hold		Swing	+7.0	

Frank Stewart (Labor) died.

==== 1977 ====
1977 Australian federal election: Grayndler
Party	Candidate	Votes	%	±%
Labor	Frank Stewart	36,299	57.7	+6.0
Liberal	Bill Vasseleou	20,980	33.4	−6.6
Democrats	Christine Townend	4,558	7.2	+7.2
Socialist	Frank Vouros	1,048	1.7	+1.7
Total formal votes		62,885	96.7	
Informal votes		2,145	3.3	
Turnout		65,030	92.0	
Two-party-preferred result
Labor	Frank Stewart		62.2	+6.8
Liberal	Bill Vasseleou		37.8	−6.8
Labor hold		Swing	+6.8	

==== 1975 ====
1975 Australian federal election: Grayndler
Party	Candidate	Votes	%	±%
Labor	Tony Whitlam	32,416	64.3	−7.9
Liberal	Jonathan Fowler	13,790	27.4	+4.7
Independent	Peter Dowd	1,713	3.4	+3.4
Independent	Douglas Spedding	1,596	3.2	+3.2
Independent	Graeme Shortland	865	1.7	+1.7
Total formal votes		50,380	96.8	
Informal votes		1,640	3.2	
Turnout		52,020	91.1	
Two-party-preferred result
Labor	Tony Whitlam		68.0	−7.7
Liberal	Jonathan Fowler		32.0	+7.7
Labor hold		Swing	−7.7	

==== 1974 ====
1974 Australian federal election: Grayndler
Party	Candidate	Votes	%	±%
Labor	Fred Daly	35,255	72.2	−1.5
Liberal	Jonathan Fowler	11,064	22.7	+1.4
Australia	Gregory Berry	2,500	5.1	+5.1
Total formal votes		48,819	97.4	
Informal votes		1,303	2.6	
Turnout		50,122	93.5	
Two-party-preferred result
Labor	Fred Daly		75.7	+1.0
Liberal	Jonathan Fowler		24.3	−1.0
Labor hold		Swing	+1.0	

==== 1972 ====
1972 Australian federal election: Grayndler
Party	Candidate	Votes	%	±%
Labor	Fred Daly	34,768	73.7	+1.8
Liberal	Jonathan Fowler	10,067	21.3	−6.7
Democratic Labor	Anthony Kiely	2,318	4.9	+4.9
Total formal votes		47,153	96.2	
Informal votes		1,861	3.8	
Turnout		49,014	93.0	
Two-party-preferred result
Labor	Fred Daly		74.7	+2.8
Liberal	Jonathan Fowler		25.3	−2.8
Labor hold		Swing	+2.8	

=== Elections in the 1960s ===
==== 1969 ====
1969 Australian federal election: Grayndler
Party	Candidate	Votes	%	±%
Labor	Fred Daly	37,161	71.9	+11.7
Liberal	Jonathan Fowler	14,516	28.1	−5.2
Total formal votes		51,677	96.0	
Informal votes		2,150	4.0	
Turnout		53,827	91.6	
Labor hold		Swing	+9.6	

==== 1966 ====
1966 Australian federal election: Grayndler
Party	Candidate	Votes	%	±%
Labor	Fred Daly	17,247	59.0	−5.5
Liberal	Basil Mottershead	10,070	34.5	+1.7
Democratic Labor	Lyle Antcliff	1,895	6.5	+6.5
Total formal votes		29,212	95.3	
Informal votes		1,433	4.7	
Turnout		30,645	92.9	
Two-party-preferred result
Labor	Fred Daly		61.1	−5.8
Liberal	Basil Mottershead		38.9	+5.8
Labor hold		Swing	−5.8	

==== 1963 ====
1963 Australian federal election: Grayndler
Party	Candidate	Votes	%	±%
Labor	Fred Daly	21,053	64.5	−2.7
Liberal	Robert Leech	10,684	32.8	+9.1
Communist	Mary Stevens	885	2.7	−4.3
Total formal votes		32,622	97.4	
Informal votes		864	2.6	
Turnout		33,486	94.6	
Two-party-preferred result
Labor	Fred Daly		66.9	−7.1
Liberal	Robert Leech		33.1	+7.1
Labor hold		Swing	−7.1	

==== 1961 ====
1961 Australian federal election: Grayndler
Party	Candidate	Votes	%	±%
Labor	Fred Daly	22,329	67.2	+5.3
Liberal	Evan MacLaurin	7,872	23.7	−3.0
Communist	Hal Alexander	2,322	7.0	−0.3
Democratic Labor	Charles McCafferty	693	2.1	−1.2
Total formal votes		33,216	95.7	
Informal votes		1,491	4.3	
Turnout		34,707	93.5	
Two-party-preferred result
Labor	Fred Daly		74.0	+4.4
Liberal	Evan MacLaurin		26.0	−4.4
Labor hold		Swing	+4.4	

=== Elections in the 1950s ===
==== 1958 ====
1958 Australian federal election: Grayndler
Party	Candidate	Votes	%	±%
Labor	Fred Daly	22,908	61.9	+1.8
Liberal	Evan MacLaurin	9,872	26.7	−3.8
Communist	Hal Alexander	2,713	7.3	−0.7
Democratic Labor	Charles McCafferty	1,220	3.3	+3.3
Independent	William McCristal	286	0.8	−0.7
Total formal votes		36,999	95.5	
Informal votes		1,754	4.5	
Turnout		38,753	94.7	
Two-party-preferred result
Labor	Fred Daly		69.6	+2.3
Liberal	Evan MacLaurin		30.4	−2.3
Labor hold		Swing	+2.3	

==== 1955 ====
1955 Australian federal election: Grayndler
Party	Candidate	Votes	%	±%
Labor	Fred Daly	24,151	60.1	−8.8
Liberal	Ian Chisholm	12,258	30.5	+0.9
Communist	Hal Alexander	3,218	8.0	+8.0
Independent	William McCristal	586	1.5	−0.5
Total formal votes		40,213	95.8	
Informal votes		1,748	4.2	
Turnout		41,961	94.7	
Two-party-preferred result
Labor	Fred Daly		67.3	−2.6
Liberal	Ian Chisholm		32.7	+2.6
Labor hold		Swing	−2.6	

==== 1954 ====
1954 Australian federal election: Grayndler
Party	Candidate	Votes	%	±%
Labor	Fred Daly	26,495	76.8	+1.9
Liberal	Kenneth Innes	7,288	21.1	−1.3
Independent	William McCristal	702	2.0	−0.6
Total formal votes		34,485	98.4	
Informal votes		576	1.6	
Turnout		35,061	96.1	
Two-party-preferred result
Labor	Fred Daly		77.8	+1.6
Liberal	Kenneth Innes		22.2	−1.6
Labor hold		Swing	+1.6	

==== 1951 ====
1951 Australian federal election: Grayndler
Party	Candidate	Votes	%	±%
Labor	Fred Daly	23,038	74.9	+7.8
Liberal	Roy Squire	8,398	22.4	−7.2
Republican	William McCristal	977	2.6	+1.7
Total formal votes		37,413	97.7	
Informal votes		869	2.3	
Turnout		38,282	96.1	
Two-party-preferred result
Labor	Fred Daly		76.2	+6.5
Liberal	Roy Squire		23.8	−6.5
Labor hold		Swing	+6.5	

=== Elections in the 1940s ===
==== 1949 ====
1949 Australian federal election: Grayndler
Party	Candidate	Votes	%	±%
Labor	Fred Daly	25,622	67.1	+5.2
Liberal	Donald Clark	11,299	29.6	+11.5
Communist	Henry McPhillips	920	2.4	−1.8
Republican	William McCristal	349	0.9	+0.9
Total formal votes		38,190	97.3	
Informal votes		1,057	2.7	
Turnout		39,247	96.4	
Two-party-preferred result
Labor	Fred Daly		69.7	−6.9
Liberal	Donald Clark		30.3	+6.9
Labor notional hold		Swing	−6.9	
