= Electoral results for the Division of Phillip =

Australian division election results

This is a list of electoral results for the Division of Phillip in Australian federal elections from the division's creation in 1949 until its abolition in 1993.

== Members ==
Member	Party	Term
Joe Fitzgerald	Labor	1949–1955
William Aston	Liberal	1955–1961
Syd Einfeld	Labor	1961–1963
(Sir) William Aston	Liberal	1963–1972
Joe Riordan	Labor	1972–1975
Jack Birney	Liberal	1975–1983
Jeannette McHugh	Labor	1983–1993

== Election results ==
=== Elections in the 1990s ===
==== 1990 ====
1990 Australian federal election: Phillip
Party	Candidate	Votes	%	±%
Labor	Jeannette McHugh	27,754	43.7	−5.4
Liberal	Charles Copeman	21,589	34.0	−8.8
Democrats	Armon Hicks	6,014	9.5	+2.7
Independent	Cynthia Wrublewski	3,828	6.0	+6.0
Greens	David Barrington	2,857	4.5	+4.5
Call to Australia	Kevin Lohan	570	0.9	+0.9
Independent	Toby Marshall	480	0.8	+0.8
Grey Power	George Vlazny	426	0.7	+0.7
Total formal votes		63,518	96.6	
Informal votes		2,200	3.4	
Turnout		65,718	94.1	
Two-party-preferred result
Labor	Jeannette McHugh	35,819	56.6	+2.5
Liberal	Charles Copeman	27,495	43.4	−2.5
Labor hold		Swing	+2.5	

=== Elections in the 1980s ===
==== 1987 ====
1987 Australian federal election: Phillip
Party	Candidate	Votes	%	±%
Labor	Jeannette McHugh	31,552	49.1	−1.1
Liberal	Ray Collins	27,508	42.8	+1.7
Democrats	Karin Sowada	4,339	6.8	+1.3
Independent	Fred Brinkman	844	1.3	+1.3
Total formal votes		64,243	95.4	
Informal votes		3,089	4.6	
Turnout		67,332	91.0	
Two-party-preferred result
Labor	Jeannette McHugh	34,743	54.1	−0.1
Liberal	Ray Collins	29,491	45.9	+0.1
Labor hold		Swing	−0.1	

==== 1984 ====
1984 Australian federal election: Phillip
Party	Candidate	Votes	%	±%
Labor	Jeannette McHugh	31,601	50.2	+0.4
Liberal	Peter Bardos	25,911	41.1	−5.2
Democrats	Karin Sowada	3,469	5.5	+2.7
Independent	Donald Rugless	1,326	2.1	+2.1
Independent	Fred Brinkman	685	1.1	+1.1
Total formal votes		62,992	93.0	
Informal votes		4,722	7.0	
Turnout		67,714	91.1	
Two-party-preferred result
Labor	Jeannette McHugh	34,163	54.2	+2.2
Liberal	Peter Bardos	28,817	45.8	−2.2
Labor hold		Swing	+2.2	

==== 1983 ====
1983 Australian federal election: Phillip
Party	Candidate	Votes	%	±%
Labor	Jeannette McHugh	29,909	49.7	+3.7
Liberal	Jack Birney	27,903	46.4	−2.3
Democrats	Karin Sowada	1,698	2.8	−1.8
Engineered Australia	Lawrence Hogan	292	0.5	+0.5
Progress	Timothy Daly	248	0.4	+0.4
Greens	Julien Droulers	146	0.2	+0.2
Total formal votes		60,196	97.2	
Informal votes		1,762	2.8	
Turnout		61,958	92.7	
Two-party-preferred result
Labor	Jeannette McHugh		51.9	+2.5
Liberal	Jack Birney		48.1	−2.5
Labor gain from Liberal		Swing	+2.5	

==== 1980 ====
1980 Australian federal election: Phillip
Party	Candidate	Votes	%	±%
Liberal	Jack Birney	29,541	48.7	+0.7
Labor	Jeannette McHugh	27,904	46.0	+2.0
Democrats	Leslie Reiss	2,781	4.6	−2.5
Independent	Russell Deiley	474	0.8	+0.8
Total formal votes		60,700	97.5	
Informal votes		1,579	2.5	
Turnout		62,279	89.9	
Two-party-preferred result
Liberal	Jack Birney	30,744	50.6	−1.4
Labor	Jeannette McHugh	29,956	49.4	+1.4
Liberal hold		Swing	−1.4	

=== Elections in the 1970s ===
==== 1977 ====
1977 Australian federal election: Phillip
Party	Candidate	Votes	%	±%
Liberal	Jack Birney	31,517	48.0	−1.2
Labor	Joe Riordan	28,876	44.0	−4.3
Democrats	Alan Needham	4,664	7.1	+7.1
Independent	Barry Elliott	581	0.9	+0.9
Total formal votes		65,638	97.8	
Informal votes		1,508	2.2	
Turnout		67,146	91.1	
Two-party-preferred result
Liberal	Jack Birney	34,127	52.0	+0.8
Labor	Joe Riordan	31,511	48.0	−0.8
Liberal hold		Swing	+0.8	

==== 1975 ====
1975 Australian federal election: Phillip
Party	Candidate	Votes	%	±%
Liberal	Jack Birney	31,869	50.6	+6.5
Labor	Joe Riordan	29,525	46.9	−5.8
Workers	Michael Clarke	882	1.4	+1.4
Australia	Marie Morris	675	1.1	−1.2
Total formal votes		62,951	98.1	
Informal votes		1,204	1.9	
Turnout		64,155	92.7	
Two-party-preferred result
Liberal	Jack Birney		52.6	+7.1
Labor	Joe Riordan		47.4	−7.1
Liberal gain from Labor		Swing	+7.1	

==== 1974 ====
1974 Australian federal election: Phillip
Party	Candidate	Votes	%	±%
Labor	Joe Riordan	31,337	52.7	+2.7
Liberal	Jack Cunningham	26,198	44.1	+3.4
Australia	Virginia Walker	1,368	2.3	−1.7
Independent	David Taylor	550	0.9	+0.9
Total formal votes		59,453	97.6	
Informal votes		1,435	2.4	
Turnout		60,888	92.8	
Two-party-preferred result
Labor	Joe Riordan		54.5	+0.8
Liberal	Jack Cunningham		45.5	−0.8
Labor hold		Swing	+0.8	

==== 1972 ====
1972 Australian federal election: Phillip
Party	Candidate	Votes	%	±%
Labor	Joe Riordan	28,065	50.0	+6.1
Liberal	Sir William Aston	22,849	40.7	−1.0
Australia	Virginia Walker	2,264	4.0	+2.9
Democratic Labor	Dennis Anderson	1,934	3.4	−1.0
Defence of Government Schools	Colette Tucker	528	0.9	+0.9
Independent	Thomas Conway	344	0.6	+0.6
Independent	Neville Yeomans	108	0.2	+0.2
Total formal votes		56,092	97.4	
Informal votes		1,490	2.6	
Turnout		57,582	92.1	
Two-party-preferred result
Labor	Joe Riordan		53.7	+4.1
Liberal	Sir William Aston		46.3	−4.1
Labor gain from Liberal		Swing	+4.1	

=== Elections in the 1960s ===
==== 1969 ====
1969 Australian federal election: Phillip
Party	Candidate	Votes	%	±%
Labor	Joe Riordan	23,121	43.9	−0.2
Liberal	William Aston	22,865	43.4	−5.8
Democratic Labor	Lyle Antcliff	2,301	4.4	+1.2
Pensioner Power	William Whitby	1,815	3.4	+3.4
Independent	Totti Cohen	1,254	2.4	+2.4
Australia	Jack Gray	590	1.1	+1.1
Independent	Ronald Rigby	327	0.6	+0.6
Independent	Ken Yeomans	238	0.5	+0.5
Independent	Alex MacDonald	129	0.3	+0.3
Total formal votes		52,640	95.8	
Informal votes		2,287	4.2	
Turnout		54,927	91.9	
Two-party-preferred result
Liberal	William Aston	26,540	50.4	−3.1
Labor	Joe Riordan	26,100	49.6	+3.1
Liberal hold		Swing	−3.1	

==== 1966 ====
1966 Australian federal election: Phillip
Party	Candidate	Votes	%	±%
Liberal	William Aston	20,277	56.2	+8.5
Labor	Brian O'Kane	13,389	37.1	−9.3
Independent	John Hannan	1,228	3.4	+3.4
Democratic Labor	Dominique Droulers	1,159	3.2	−2.6
Total formal votes		36,053	96.7	
Informal votes		1,225	3.3	
Turnout		37,278	93.5	
Two-party-preferred result
Liberal	William Aston		60.5	+7.7
Labor	Brian O'Kane		39.5	−7.7
Liberal hold		Swing	+7.7	

==== 1963 ====
1963 Australian federal election: Phillip
Party	Candidate	Votes	%	±%
Liberal	William Aston	18,128	47.7	+3.6
Labor	Syd Einfeld	17,634	46.4	−3.9
Democratic Labor	John Antill	2,215	5.8	+0.3
Total formal votes		37,977	98.3	
Informal votes		664	1.7	
Turnout		38,641	94.6	
Two-party-preferred result
Liberal	William Aston	20,048	52.8	+4.2
Labor	Syd Einfeld	17,929	47.2	−4.2
Liberal gain from Labor		Swing	+4.2	

==== 1961 ====
1961 Australian federal election: Phillip
Party	Candidate	Votes	%	±%
Labor	Syd Einfeld	19,094	50.3	+4.1
Liberal	William Aston	16,741	44.1	−3.0
Democratic Labor	Peter Daly	2,102	5.5	+0.0
Total formal votes		37,937	97.3	
Informal votes		1,061	2.7	
Turnout		38,998	93.7	
Two-party-preferred result
Labor	Syd Einfeld		51.4	+3.3
Liberal	William Aston		48.6	−3.3
Labor gain from Liberal		Swing	+3.3	

=== Elections in the 1950s ===
==== 1958 ====
1958 Australian federal election: Phillip
Party	Candidate	Votes	%	±%
Liberal	William Aston	18,836	47.1	−4.0
Labor	Joe Fitzgerald	18,467	46.2	−2.7
Democratic Labor	Peter Daly	2,206	5.5	+5.5
Independent	Sidney Doubleday	463	1.2	+1.2
Total formal votes		39,972	96.6	
Informal votes		1,421	3.4	
Turnout		41,393	94.7	
Two-party-preferred result
Liberal	William Aston	20,735	51.9	+0.8
Labor	Joe Fitzgerald	19,237	48.1	−0.8
Liberal hold		Swing	+0.8	

==== 1955 ====
1955 Australian federal election: Phillip
Party	Candidate	Votes	%	±%
Liberal	William Aston	21,142	51.1	+5.7
Labor	Joe Fitzgerald	20,225	48.9	−5.7
Total formal votes		41,367	97.1	
Informal votes		1,228	2.9	
Turnout		42,595	94.8	
Liberal gain from Labor		Swing	+5.7	

==== 1954 ====
1954 Australian federal election: Phillip
Party	Candidate	Votes	%	±%
Labor	Joe Fitzgerald	19,826	58.9	+5.5
Liberal	Henry Clarke	13,849	41.1	−5.5
Total formal votes		33,675	98.5	
Informal votes		519	1.5	
Turnout		40,547	96.9	
Labor hold		Swing	+5.5	

==== 1951 ====
1951 Australian federal election: Phillip
Party	Candidate	Votes	%	±%
Labor	Joe Fitzgerald	19,401	53.4	+2.2
Liberal	Les Fingleton	16,913	46.6	+3.7
Total formal votes		36,314	97.9	
Informal votes		779	2.1	
Turnout		37,093	95.4	
Labor hold		Swing	−2.3	

=== Elections in the 1940s ===
==== 1949 ====
1949 Australian federal election: Phillip
Party	Candidate	Votes	%	±%
Labor	Joe Fitzgerald	19,455	51.2	−7.8
Liberal	William Latimer	16,302	42.9	+3.4
Independent	Jessie Street	2,272	6.0	+6.0
Total formal votes		38,029	98.0	
Informal votes		762	2.0	
Turnout		38,791	96.3	
Two-party-preferred result
Labor	Joe Fitzgerald		55.7	−4.0
Liberal	William Latimer		44.3	+4.0
Labor notional hold		Swing	−4.0	
