= Post-election pendulum for the 1990 Australian federal election =

The Mackerras pendulum as a way of predicting the outcome of an election contested between two major parties in a Westminster style lower house legislature such as the Australian House of Representatives, which is composed of single-member electorates and which uses a preferential voting system such as a Condorcet method or instant-runoff voting.

The pendulum works by lining up all of the seats held in Parliament for the government, the opposition and the crossbenches according to the percentage point margin they are held by on a two party preferred basis. This is also known as the swing required for the seat to change hands. Given a uniform swing to the opposition or government parties, the number of seats that change hands can be predicted.

Government seats (78)
Marginal
Stirling	WA	Ron Edwards	ALP	0.2
Richmond	NSW	Neville Newell	ALP	0.5
Page	NSW	Harry Woods	ALP	0.7
Cowan	WA	Carolyn Jakobsen	ALP	0.9
Kennedy	Qld	Rob Hulls	ALP	1.4
Canning	WA	George Gear	ALP	1.8
Fisher	Qld	Michael Lavarch	ALP	2.0
Melbourne Ports	Vic	Clyde Holding	ALP	2.1
Moreton	Qld	Garrie Gibson	ALP	2.3
Petrie	Qld	Gary Johns	ALP	2.3
Cunningham	NSW	Stewart West	ALP	2.4 v DEM
Swan	WA	Kim Beazley	ALP	2.4
Makin	SA	Peter Duncan	ALP	2.4
Jagajaga	Vic	Peter Staples	ALP	2.6
Robertson	NSW	Frank Walker	ALP	2.8
Barton	NSW	Gary Punch	ALP	3.1
Burke	Vic	Neil O'Keefe	ALP	3.3
Calare	NSW	David Simmons	ALP	3.5
Leichhardt	Qld	John Gayler	ALP	3.5
Adelaide	SA	Bob Catley	ALP	3.7
Hinkler	Qld	Brian Courtice	ALP	4.0
Corio	Vic	Gordon Scholes	ALP	4.2
Hotham	Vic	Simon Crean	ALP	4.2
Eden-Monaro	NSW	Jim Snow	ALP	4.3
Forde	Qld	Mary Crawford	ALP	4.5
Herbert	Qld	Ted Lindsay	ALP	4.9
Kingston	SA	Gordon Bilney	ALP	5.0
Northern Territory	NT	Warren Snowdon	ALP	5.0
Brand	WA	Wendy Fatin	ALP	5.2
Perth	WA	Ric Charlesworth	ALP	5.2
Hindmarsh	SA	John Scott	ALP	5.3
Brisbane	Qld	Arch Bevis	ALP	5.5
Rankin	Qld	David Beddall	ALP	5.5
Canberra	ACT	Ros Kelly	ALP	5.8
Fairly safe
Denison	Tas	Duncan Kerr	ALP	6.4
Grey	SA	Lloyd O'Neil	ALP	6.5
Hughes	NSW	Robert Tickner	ALP	6.6
Phillip	NSW	Jeannette McHugh	ALP	6.6
Holt	Vic	Michael Duffy	ALP	6.9
Calwell	Vic	Andrew Theophanous	ALP	7.1
Maribyrnong	Vic	Alan Griffiths	ALP	7.2
Capricornia	Qld	Keith Wright	ALP	7.3
Bowman	Qld	Con Sciacca	ALP	7.5
Lilley	Qld	Elaine Darling	ALP	7.7
St George	NSW	Stephen Dubois	ALP	7.8
Banks	NSW	Daryl Melham	ALP	7.9
Wills	Vic	Bob Hawke	ALP	7.9
Parramatta	NSW	Paul Elliott	ALP	8.3
Fremantle	WA	John Dawkins	ALP	8.3
Hunter	NSW	Eric Fitzgibbon	ALP	8.4
Greenway	NSW	Russ Gorman	ALP	8.8
Lalor	Vic	Barry Jones	ALP	9.0
Scullin	Vic	Harry Jenkins	ALP	9.4
Safe
Lindsay	NSW	Ross Free	ALP	10.1
Throsby	NSW	Colin Hollis	ALP	10.2
Kalgoorlie	WA	Graeme Campbell	ALP	10.2
Griffith	Qld	Ben Humphreys	ALP	10.3
Dobell	NSW	Michael Lee	ALP	10.6
Fraser	ACT	John Langmore	ALP	11.3
Oxley	Qld	Les Scott	ALP	12.0
Blaxland	NSW	Paul Keating	ALP	12.2
Macarthur	NSW	Stephen Martin	ALP	12.7
Newcastle	NSW	Allan Morris	ALP	12.8 v IND
Grayndler	NSW	Leo McLeay	ALP	13.3
Port Adelaide	SA	Rod Sawford	ALP	13.3
Prospect	NSW	Janice Crosio	ALP	14.0
Werriwa	NSW	John Kerin	ALP	14.0
Fowler	NSW	Ted Grace	ALP	14.2
Shortland	NSW	Peter Morris	ALP	14.3
Kingsford Smith	NSW	Laurie Brereton	ALP	15.0
Charlton	NSW	Bob Brown	ALP	15.7
Bonython	SA	Neal Blewett	ALP	15.9
Reid	NSW	Laurie Ferguson	ALP	16.1
Batman	Vic	Brian Howe	ALP	17.4
Melbourne	Vic	Gerry Hand	ALP	17.5
Gellibrand	Vic	Ralph Willis	ALP	18.5
Very safe
Chifley	NSW	Roger Price	ALP	20.1
Sydney	NSW	Peter Baldwin	ALP	21.4

Opposition seats (69)
Marginal
Hawker	SA	Chris Gallus	LIB	0.01
Dawson	Qld	Ray Braithwaite	NAT	0.1
Lowe	NSW	Bob Woods	LIB	0.6
Corinella	Vic	Russell Broadbent	LIB	0.7
Bendigo	Vic	Bruce Reid	LIB	1.1
Dunkley	Vic	Frank Ford	LIB	1.2
La Trobe	Vic	Bob Charles	LIB	1.4
Ballarat	Vic	Michael Ronaldson	LIB	1.9
Franklin	Tas	Bruce Goodluck	LIB	2.1
Lyons	Tas	Max Burr	LIB	2.1
Deakin	Vic	Ken Aldred	LIB	2.4
McEwen	Vic	Fran Bailey	LIB	3.2
Macquarie	NSW	Alasdair Webster	LIB	3.6
Fadden	Qld	David Jull	LIB	3.8
Bass	Tas	Warwick Smith	LIB	4.3
Gilmore	NSW	John Sharp	NAT	4.4
McMillan	Vic	John Riggall	LIB	4.4
Riverina-Darling	NSW	Noel Hicks	NAT	4.5
Aston	Vic	Peter Nugent	LIB	4.6
Wide Bay	Qld	Warren Truss	NAT	4.9
Flinders	Vic	Peter Reith	LIB	5.2
Isaacs	Vic	Rod Atkinson	LIB	5.7
Goldstein	Vic	David Kemp	LIB	6.0
Fairly safe
New England	NSW	Ian Sinclair	NAT	6.3
Chisholm	Vic	Michael Wooldridge	LIB	6.3
Moore	WA	Paul Filing	LIB	6.9
Wentworth	NSW	John Hewson	LIB	7.2
Ryan	Qld	John Moore	LIB	7.2
Cook	NSW	Don Dobie	LIB	7.3
Cowper	NSW	Garry Nehl	NAT	7.3
Lyne	NSW	Bruce Cowan	NAT	7.3
Fairfax	Qld	Alex Somlyay	LIB	7.5
Sturt	SA	Ian Wilson	LIB	7.7
Hume	NSW	Wal Fife	LIB	8.2
Casey	Vic	Bob Halverson	LIB	8.2
Braddon	Tas	Chris Miles	LIB	8.4
Pearce	WA	Fred Chaney	LIB	8.9
Dundas	NSW	Phillip Ruddock	LIB	9.3
Bruce	Vic	Julian Beale	LIB	9.3
Moncrieff	Qld	Kathy Sullivan	LIB	9.5
Warringah	NSW	Michael MacKellar	LIB	9.9
Forrest	WA	Geoff Prosser	LIB	9.9
Safe
Bennelong	NSW	John Howard	LIB	10.3
Parkes	NSW	Michael Cobb	NAT	10.7
Boothby	SA	Steele Hall	LIB	10.7
Corangamite	Vic	Stewart McArthur	LIB	10.8
McPherson	Qld	John Bradford	LIB	11.0
Mackellar	NSW	Jim Carlton	LIB	11.1
Gwydir	NSW	John Anderson	NAT	11.2
Mayo	SA	Alexander Downer	LIB	11.6
Higgins	Vic	Peter Costello	LIB	11.8
Tangney	WA	Peter Shack	LIB	11.8
Groom	Qld	Bill Taylor	LIB	12.2
Wannon	Vic	David Hawker	LIB	12.7
Berowra	NSW	Harry Edwards	LIB	12.8
Curtin	WA	Allan Rocher	LIB	12.8
Wakefield	SA	Neil Andrew	LIB	12.9
Maranoa	Qld	Bruce Scott	NAT	13.2
Barker	SA	Ian McLachlan	LIB	13.6
Indi	Vic	Ewen Cameron	LIB	14.2
Menzies	Vic	Neil Brown	LIB	14.3
Kooyong	Vic	Andrew Peacock	LIB	14.8
Farrer	NSW	Tim Fischer	NAT	17.8
Gippsland	Vic	Peter McGauran	NAT	18.9
Very safe
Mitchell	NSW	Alan Cadman	LIB	20.3
O'Connor	WA	Wilson Tuckey	LIB	21.9
Bradfield	NSW	David Connolly	LIB	22.3
Murray	Vic	Bruce Lloyd	NAT	23.3
Mallee	Vic	Peter Fisher	NAT	23.8
Crossbench seats (1)
North Sydney	NSW	Ted Mack	IND	7.7 v LIB
