= 1990 Australian House of Representatives election =

1990 Australian federal election
- 24 March 1990

All 148 seats in the House of Representatives 75 seats were needed for a majority in the House 40 (of the 76) seats in the Senate
- Registered: 10,728,435 ▲3.62%
- Turnout: 10,225,800 (95.31%) (▲1.47 pp)
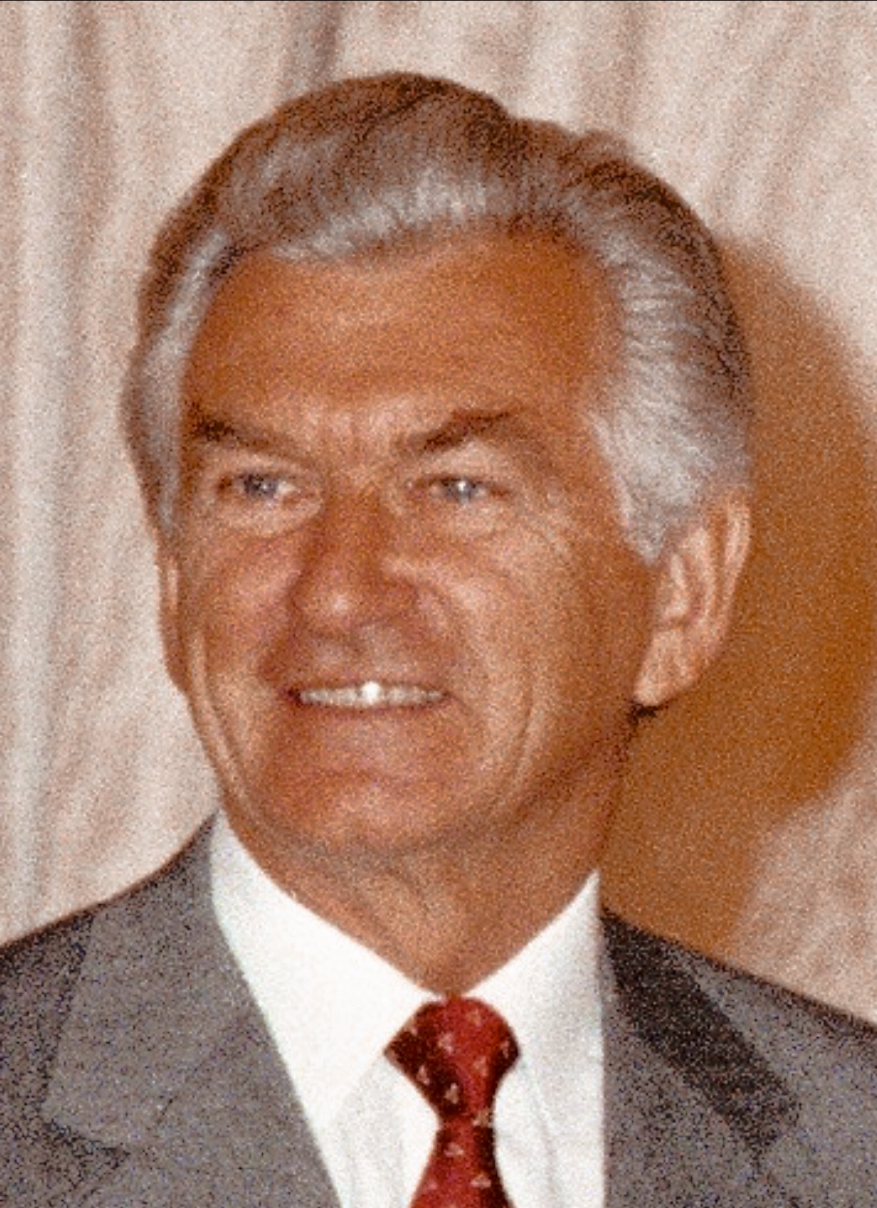

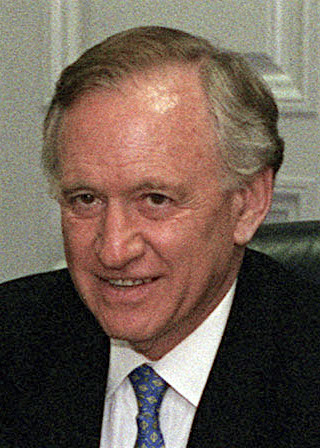
	First party	Second party
Leader	Bob Hawke	Andrew Peacock
Party	Labor	Liberal–National Coalition
Leader since	8 February 1983	9 May 1989
Leader's seat	Wills (Vic.)	Kooyong (Vic.)
Last election	86 seats	62 seats
Seats won	78 seats	69 seats
Seat change	▼8	▲7
First preference vote	3,904,138	4,302,127
Percentage	39.44%	43.46%
Swing	▼6.46%	▼2.44%
TPP	49.90%	50.10%
TPP swing	▼0.93	▲0.93
- Results by division for the House of Representatives, shaded by winning party's margin of victory.
Prime Minister before election
Bob Hawke
Labor
Subsequent Prime Minister
Bob Hawke
Labor

The following tables show results for the Australian House of Representatives at the 1990 federal election held on 24 March 1990.

== Australia ==
House of Reps (IRV) — 1990–93 — Turnout 95.32% (CV) — Informal 3.19%
Party	Votes	%	Swing	Seats	Change
Liberal	3,440,902	34.76	+0.44	55	▲12
National	833,557	8.42	–3.10	14	▼5
Country Liberal	27,668	0.28	+0.05	0	Steady
Liberal–National Coalition	4,302,127	43.46	–2.44	69	▲7
Labor	3,904,138	39.44	–6.46	78	▼8
Democrats	1,114,216	11.26	+5.26		
Greens (state-based) (Note: There was no federal Australian Greens party at this election. The Greens total includes Greens Western Australia (67,164), NSW Green Alliance (Note: At this election the Greens in New South Wales were a loose alliance largely organised by local groups, with 18 candidates running under a variety of names: Australian Gruen Party (Fowler, Macarthur, Mackellar, Macquarie, Prospect, St George, Throsby and Werriwa), the Greens (Phillip and Wentworth), Illawarra Greens (Cunningham and Hughes), Sydney Greens, South Sydney Greens (Kingsford Smith), Central Coast Green Party (Dobell and Robertson), Greens in Lowe and Cowper Greens.) (45,819), Queensland Greens (10,054), United Tasmania Group (6,367), Greens South Australia (1,878) and ACT Green Democratic Alliance (6,069).)	137,351	1.37			
Call to Australia	96,497	0.97			
Grey Power	20,984	0.21			
Democratic Socialist	20,668	0.21	+0.20		
Independent EFF	9,375	0.09			
Rex Connor Labor	8,277	0.08			
New Australia	7,043	0.07			
Nuclear Disarmament	5,578	0.06	–0.05		
Environment Inds	4,866	0.05			
Citizens Electoral Council	3,524	0.04			
Democratic Labor	2,564	0.03	–0.01		
Socialist	2,255	0.02			
Conservative	1,734	0.02			
Pensioner	1,170	0.01	–0.03		
AAFI	835	0.01			
Independents (Note: The independent member was Ted Mack (NSW). He was the first Independent since 1966 Sam Benson)	257,139	2.60	+0.94	1	▲1
Total	9,899,674			148	
Two-party-preferred vote
Labor	4,930,837	49.90	−0.93	78	▼8
Liberal–National Coalition	4,950,072	50.10	+0.93	69	▲7
Invalid/blank votes	326,126	3.19	–1.75		
Turnout	10,225,800	95.32			
Registered voters	10,728,131				
Source: Federal Elections 1990

== States ==
=== New South Wales ===
1990 Australian federal election (New South Wales)
- 24 March 1990

All 51 New South Wales seats in the Australian House of Representatives and 6 seats in the Australian Senate
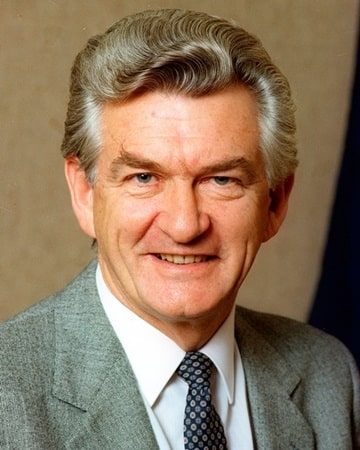

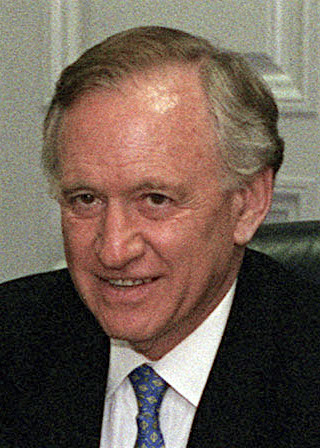
	First party	Second party
Leader	Bob Hawke	Andrew Peacock
Party	Labor	Liberal/National coalition
Last election	28 seats	23 seats
Seats won	30 seats	20 seats
Seat change	▲2	▼3
Popular vote	1,380,780	1,352,770
Percentage	41.16%	40.32%
Swing	▲4.0	▼4.7
TPP	51.94%	48.61%
TPP swing	▲1.65	▼1.65

Turnout 95.4% (CV) — Informal 3.1%
Party	Votes	%	Swing	Seats	Change
Liberal	975,083	32.76	−4.19	12	▼1
National	377,687	10.53	−0.52	8	▼2
Liberal/National Coalition	1,352,770	40.32	−4.72	20	▼3
Labor	1,380,780	41.16	+4.01	30	▲2
Democrats	342,540	10.21	+6.34		
Independents	166,832	4.97	+1.55	1	▲1
Green Alliance	45,819	1.37			
Call to Australia	21,646	0.65			
Independent EFF	9,375	0.28			
Rex Connor Labor	8,277	0.25			
New Australia	6,376	0.19			
Democratic Socialist	5,809	0.17			
Grey Power	5,034	0.15			
Environment Inds	4,866	0.15			
Nuclear Disarmament	3,210	0.10	+0.07		
Socialist	1,337	0.04			
Total	3,354,671			51	
Two-party-preferred vote
Labor	1,706,398	51.94	+1.65		▲2
Liberal/National Coalition	1,578,738	48.06	–1.65		▼3
Invalid/blank votes	108,134	3.1	–1.5		
Turnout	3,462,805	95.4			
Registered voters	3,630,841				
Source: Federal Elections 1990

=== Victoria ===
1990 Australian federal election (Victoria)
- 24 March 1990

All 38 Victorian seats in the Australian House of Representatives and 6 seats in the Australian Senate
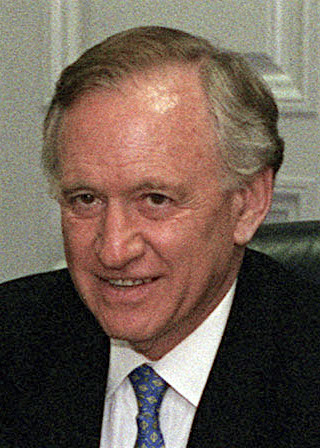

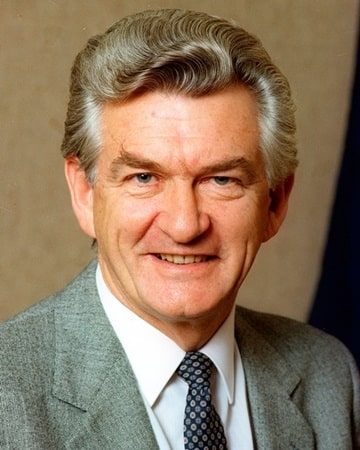
	First party	Second party
Leader	Andrew Peacock	Bob Hawke
Party	Liberal/National coalition	Labor
Last election	15	24 seats
Seats won	24 seats	14 seats
Seat change	▲9	▼10
Popular vote	1,172,809	951,674
Percentage	45.7%	37.1%
Swing	▲1.4	▼9.8
TPP	52.5%	47.5%
TPP swing	▲5.1	▼5.1

Turnout 95.7% (CV) — Informal 3.5%
Party	Votes	%	Swing	Seats	Change
Liberal	1,018,740	39.7	+1.7	21	▲9
National	154,069	6.0	−0.3	3	Steady
Liberal/National Coalition	1,172,809	45.7	+1.4	24	▲9
Labor	951,674	37.1	−9.8	14	▼10
Democrats	319,149	12.43	+5.7		
Independents	55,357	2.16	−4.3		
Call to Australia	52,554	2.05			
Democratic Socialist	6,836	0.27			
Citizens Electoral Council	3,524	0.14			
Democratic Labor	2,564	0.10	−0.04		
Socialist	918	0.04			
Pensioner	910	0.04			
AAFI	835	0.03			
Total	2,567,130			38	▼1
Two-party-preferred vote
Liberal/National Coalition	1,347,048	52.54	+5.1	24	▲9
Labor	1,216,633	47.46	−5.1	14	▼10
Invalid/blank votes	94,334	3.54	−1.7		
Turnout	2,661,464	95.68			
Registered voters	2,781,547				
Source: Federal Elections 1990

=== Queensland ===
1990 Australian federal election (Queensland)
- 24 March 1990

All 24 Queensland seats in the Australian House of Representatives and 6 seats in the Australian Senate
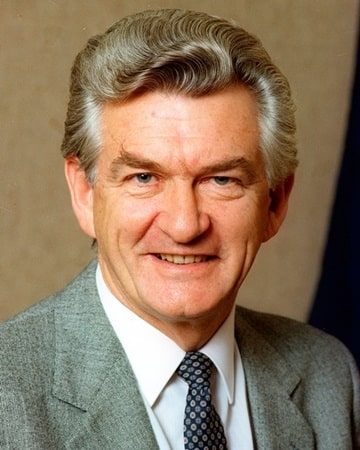

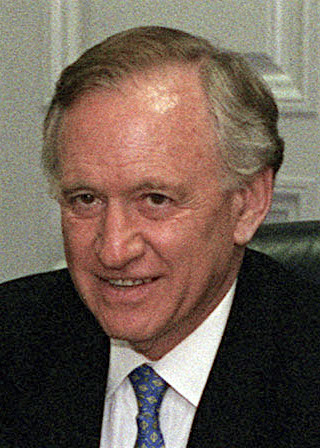
	First party	Second party
Leader	Bob Hawke	Andrew Peacock
Party	Labor	Liberal/National coalition
Last election	13	11 seats
Seats won	15 seats	9 seats
Seat change	▲2	▼2
Popular vote	695,291	756,680
Percentage	41.6%	45.3%
Swing	▼3.4	▼4.6
TPP	50.19%	49.81%
TPP swing	▲0.87	▼0.87

Turnout 94.7% (CV) — Informal 2.2%
Party	Votes	%	Swing	Seats	Change
Liberal	476,560	28.51	7.49	6	▲1
National	280,120	16.76	–12.09	3	▼3
Liberal/National Coalition	756,680	45.27	–4.60	9	▼2
Labor	695,291	41.59	–3.37	15	▲2
Democrats	193,817	11.59	6.71		
Independent	11,499	0.69	0.51		
Greens	10,054	0.60	0.60		
Democratic Socialist	2,728	0.16	0.16		
Conservative	1,528	0.09	0.09		
Total	1,671,597			24	
Two-party-preferred vote
Labor	837,508	50.19	+0.87	15	▲2
Liberal/National Coalition	831,015	49.81	–0.87	9	▼2
Invalid/blank votes	38,065	2.23	–1.18		
Turnout	1,709,662	94.71			
Registered voters	1,805,141				
Source: Federal Elections 1990

=== Western Australia ===
1990 Australian federal election (Western Australia)
- 24 March 1990

All 14 Western Australia seats in the Australian House of Representatives and 6 seats in the Australian Senate
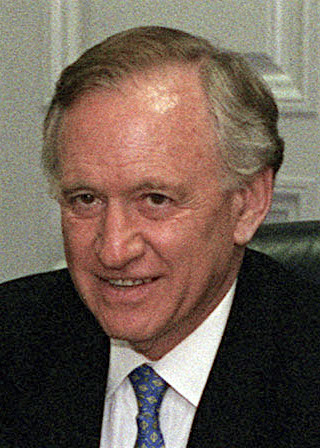

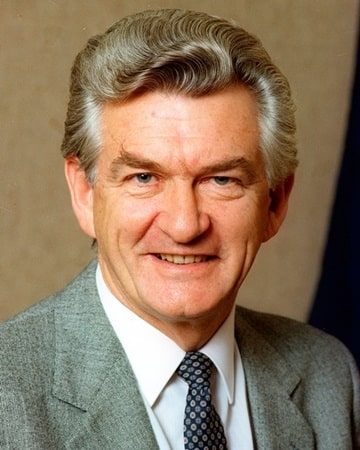
	First party	Second party
Leader	Andrew Peacock	Bob Hawke
Party	Liberal/National coalition	Labor
Last election	4 seats	9 seats
Seats won	6 seats	8 seats
Seat change	▲2	▼1
Popular vote	414,551	316,186
Percentage	46.3%	35.3%
Swing	▼2.4	▼12.2
TPP	52.87%	47.13%
TPP swing	▲3.78	▼3.78

Turnout 94.5% (CV) — informal 3.7%
Party	Votes	%	Swing	Seats	Change
Liberal	392,870	43.91	2.12	6	▲2
National	21,681	2.42	-4.48		Steady
Liberal/National Coalition	414,551	46.33	-2.36	6	▲2
Labor	316,186	35.34	-12.14	8	▼1
Democrats	75,197	8.40	+4.97		
Greens	67,164	7.51			
Grey Power	12,043	1.35			
Independents	5,756	0.64	+0.25		
Democratic Socialist	3,336	0.37			
Pensioner	260	0.03			
Conservative	206	0.02			
Total	894,699			14	▲1
Two-party-preferred vote
Labor	420,816	47.13	-3.78	8	▼1
Liberal/National Coalition	472,092	52.87	3.78	6	▲2
Invalid/blank votes	34,418	3.70	-2.86		
Turnout	929,117	94.53			
Registered voters	982,901				
Source: Federal Elections 1990

=== South Australia ===
1990 Australian federal election (South Australia)
- 24 March 1990

All 13 South Australian seats in the Australian House of Representatives and 6 seats in the Australian Senate
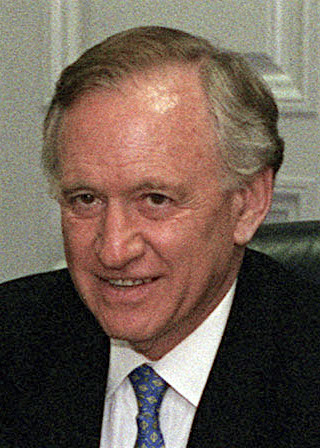

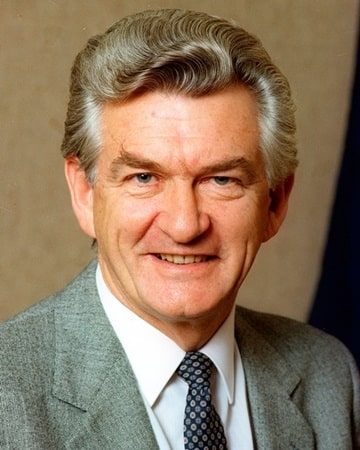
	First party	Second party
Leader	Andrew Peacock	Bob Hawke
Party	Liberal/National coalition	Labor
Last election	5 seats	8 seats
Seats won	6 seats	7 seats
Seat change	▲1	▼1
Popular vote	381,172	339,218
Percentage	42.6%	38.0%
Swing	▲0.1	▼6.6
TPP	50.5%	49.5%
TPP swing	▲0.7	▼0.7

Turnout 96.0% (CV) — Informal 3.7%
Party	Votes	%	Swing	Seats	Change
Liberal	381,172	42.65	+0.14	6	▲1
Labor	339,218	37.95	-6.60	7	▼1
Democrats	135,546	15.17	+7.38		
Call to Australia	22,297	2.49			
Independents	8,104	0.91	0.02		
Grey Power	3,907	0.44			
Greens	1,878	0.21			
Democratic Socialist	1,632	0.18			
Total	893,754			13	
Two-party-preferred vote
Labor	441,659	49.5	-0.7	7	▼1
Liberal/National Coalition	450.503	50.5	+0.7	6	▲1
Invalid/blank votes	34,143	3.68	-3.16		
Turnout	927,897	96.01			
Registered voters	966,431				
Source: Federal Elections 1990

=== Tasmania ===
1990 Australian federal election (Tasmania)
- 24 March 1990

All 5 Tasmanian seats in the Australian House of Representatives and 6 seats in the Australian Senate
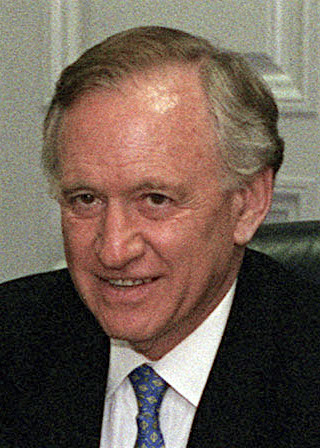

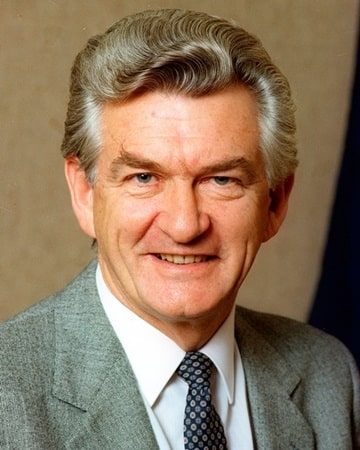
	First party	Second party
Leader	Andrew Peacock	Bob Hawke
Party	Liberal/National coalition	Labor
Last election	4 seats	1 seat
Seats won	4 seats	1 seat
Seat change	Steady	Steady
Popular vote	140,722	115,053
Percentage	48.61%	39.74%
Swing	▼2.44	▼3.25
TPP	52.1%	47.9%
TPP swing	▼1.0	▲1.0

Turnout 96.5% (CV) — Informal 2.3%
Party	Votes	%	Swing	Seats	Change
Liberal	140,722	48.61	−2.44	4	Steady
Labor	115,053	39.74	−3.25	1	Steady
Democrats	24,876	8.59	+2.63		Steady
United Tasmania	6,367	2.20			
Independent	2,159	0.75			
Democratic Socialist	327	0.11			
Total	289,504			5	
Two-party-preferred vote
Liberal	138,556	52.10	−1.00	4	Steady
Labor	150,709	47.90	+1.00	1	Steady
Invalid/blank votes	9,774	3.27	−1.68		
Turnout	299,278	96.5			
Registered voters	300,763				
Source: Federal Elections 1990

== Territories ==
=== Australian Capital Territory ===
1990 Australian federal election (Australian Capital Territory)
- 1 December 1990

Both Australian Capital Territory seats in the Australian House of Representatives and both seats in the Australian Senate
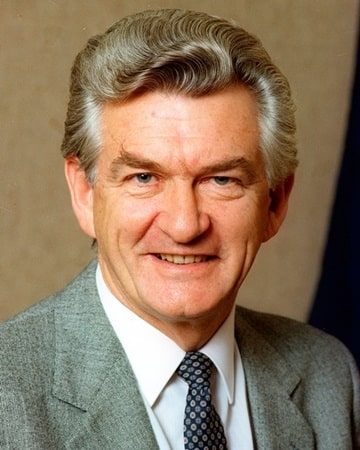

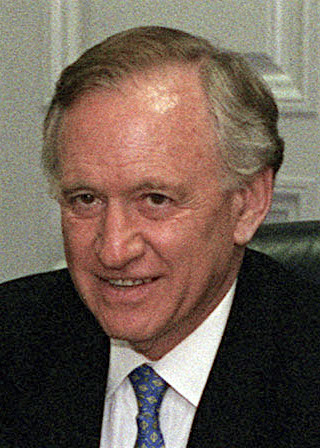
	First party	Second party
Leader	Bob Hawke	Andrew Peacock
Party	Labor	Coalition
Last election	2 seats	0 seats
Seats won	2	0
Seat change	Steady	Steady
Popular vote	71,830	55,755
Percentage	44.88%	34.83%
Swing	▼9.04	▲4.55
TPP	58.54%	41.46%
TPP swing	▼4.71	▲4.71

Turnout 94.1% (CV) — Informal 2.9%
Party	Votes	%	Swing	Seats	Change
Labor	71,830	44.88	-9.04	2	Steady
Liberal	55,755	34.83	4.55		Steady
Democrats	23,091	14.43	7.59		
Green Democratic	6,069	3.79	0.00		
Nuclear Disarmament	2,368	1.48	-3.19		
Independent	949	0.59	-0.96		
Total	160,062			2	
Two-party-preferred vote
Labor	93,498	58.54	-4.71	2	Steady
Liberal	66,206	41.46	4.71	0	Steady
Invalid/blank votes	4,871	2.95	-0.53		
Turnout	164,933	95.78			
Registered voters	172,200				
Source: Psephos Adam Carr's Election Archive 1990

=== Northern Territory ===
1990 Australian federal election (Northern Territory)
- 1 December 1990

The one Northern Territory seat in the Australian House of Representatives and both seats in the Australian Senate
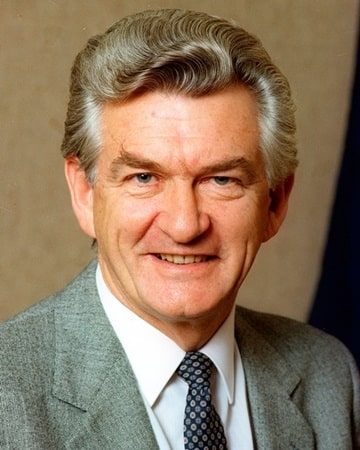

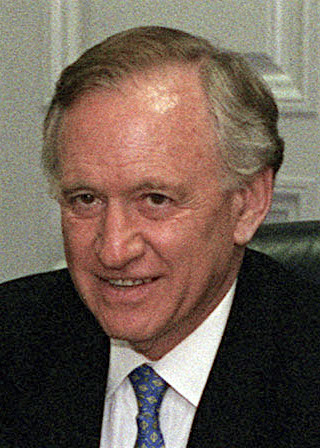
	First party	Second party
Leader	Bob Hawke	Andrew Peacock
Party	Labor	Coalition
Last election	1 seat	0 seats
Seats won	1	0
Seat change	Steady	Steady
Popular vote	34,106	27,668
Percentage	50.0%	40.5%
Swing	▲3.1	▲4.5
TPP	55.0%	45.0%
TPP swing	▲2.8	▼2.8

1990 Australian federal election: Northern Territory
Party	Candidate	Votes	%	±%
Labor	Warren Snowdon	34,106	50.0	+3.1
Country Liberal	Helen Galton	27,668	40.5	+4.5
Independent	Don Beaton	1,900	2.8	+2.8
Independent	Bob Liddle	1,427	2.1	+2.1
Independent	Tig Donnellan	1,380	2.0	+2.0
Independent	Strider	975	1.4	+1.4
Independent	Ron Sterry	801	1.2	+1.2
Total formal votes		68,257	96.6	
Informal votes		2,387	3.4	
Turnout		70,644	89.4	
Two-party-preferred result
Labor	Warren Snowdon	37,498	55.0	+2.8
Country Liberal	Helen Galton	30,650	45.0	−2.8
Labor hold		Swing	+2.8	

== See also ==
- Post-election pendulum for the 1990 Australian federal election
- Results of the 1990 Australian federal election (Senate)
- Members of the Australian House of Representatives, 1990–1993
