= Dave Smith (priest) =

Australian Anglican priest, born 1962

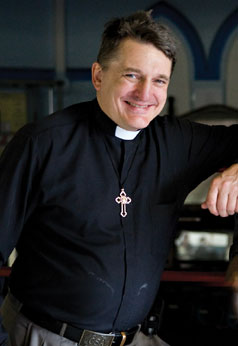
- Born: 17 February 1962 (age 64)
- Occupation: Priest
- Known for: Work with at-risk youth Boxing
- Political party: United Australia
- Website: fatherdave.org

David Smith (born 17 February 1962), sometimes referred to as "Fighting Father Dave", is an Australian Anglican priest.

Smith is known for his work with at-risk youths, especially in his use of boxing for those with substance abuse problems and anger management issues. He is also a 6th degree black belt and a professional boxer. His progression into martial arts and boxing happened while he was attempting to raise funds for the community in Dulwich Hill, where he was the parish priest.

Smith is also a published author and has taken a very public stance on various human-rights issues, most especially the Israel-Palestine conflict and the Syrian civil war, where he opposes all forms of Western military intervention..

Smith has twice been awarded the Marrickville Citizen of the Year award and was nominated for Australian of the Year in 2004 and 2009. In 2012, he broke the world record for the most continuous rounds of boxing.

Smith ran as a candidate for the United Australia Party in the Division of Grayndler in the 2022 Australian federal electionHe received just 2000 votes. .

== Early life ==
Smith was born in Newtown, Sydney, in 1962 to Bruce and Joan Smith – the oldest of three boys. His father was a well-known Evangelical Anglican priest, public speaker and theological lecturer.

Smith completed an arts degree with honours in philosophy in 1984 before beginning studying theology at Moore College in 1985. He completed two degrees in theology in 1988 and was ordained a priest in the Anglican Church of Australia in 1989.

== Career ==
After ordination, Smith spent two years in the parish of Miranda in Sydney's south before being appointed to Dulwich Hill in Sydney's inner-west in December 1990.

When Smith became the parish priest in Dulwich Hill it was known as an area that was rife with drugs. In 1991, he began to focus on working with young people with drug problems in the area and opened up the church hall as an area where local youth could do fitness and martial arts training. In 1993, he founded the Order of the Fighting Fathers as a way of encouraging other priests and religious people to use the fighting arts to help young people overcome their addictions and lead fuller lives.

Holy Trinity's youth centre went full-time in 1994, with the primary aim of being a safe place for local young people where they were provided with a safe place to be in with counselling and spiritual input. In 2013, a young client burnt down the centre and this received widespread media coverage. Smith moved the centre to premises provided by the Dulwich Hill Salvation Army.

Smith's work in the community led him to twice be awarded the Marrickville Citizen of the Year award, in 1997 and 2009. In 2005 and 2009 he was also nominated for Australian of the Year, particularly for his work with young people battling substance abuse. In 2001, a short film was made about Smith, which is titled The Good Fight.

In 2011, Smith began training in an attempt to break the world record for the longest period of continuous boxing. On 1 April 2012, he boxed continuously for eight hours against 66 opponents over 120 three-minute rounds. He succeeded in breaking the world record and received extensive media coverage, including from Fox Sports. The previous world record before this attempt was 26 rounds. On 19 February 2016, Smith returned to professional boxing to raise money for youth programs and became Australia's oldest ever professional boxer.

== Author ==
Smith is a self-published author and in 2020 published Christians and Muslims can be Friends. Previously he wrote the book Sex, the Ring and the Eucharist. The book is a series of snapshots from Smith's life and is known for its straight talking and honesty, as well as Smith being critical of the established church and the legal system. Despite the criticism, it has been said that there is a pervading sense of faith and hope running through the book.
