= 1955 Australian federal election =

- 10 December 1955

All 124 (Note: The Northern Territory and Australian Capital Territory each had one seat, but members for the territories did not have full voting rights until 1966 and did not count toward government formation.) seats of the House of Representatives 62 seats were needed for a majority in the House 30 (of the 60) seats of the Senate
- Registered: 5,172,443 ▲1.49%
- Turnout: 4,525,774 (95.00%) (Note: Turnout in contested seats) (▼1.09 pp)
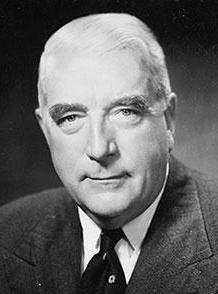

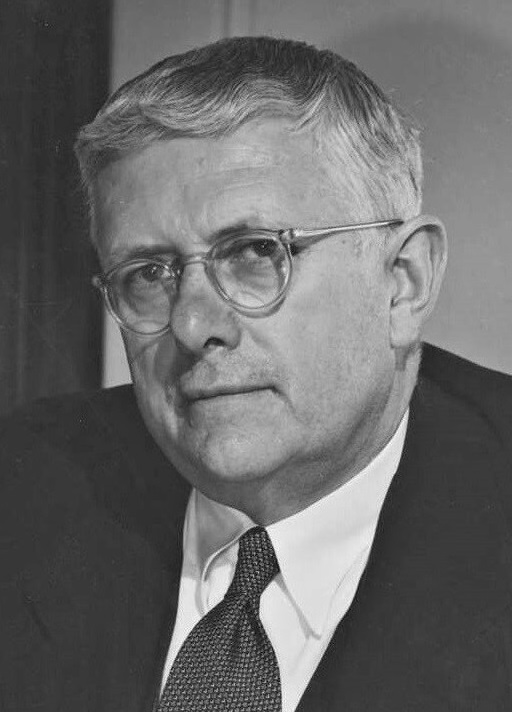
	First party	Second party
Leader	Robert Menzies	H. V. Evatt
Party	Liberal–Country; Coalition	Labor
Leader since	23 September 1943	13 June 1951
Leader's seat	Kooyong (Vic.)	Barton (NSW)
Last election	64 seats	57 seats
Seats won	75	47 + NT + ACT
Seat change	▲11	▼10
Primary vote	2,093,430	1,961,359
Percentage	47.67%	44.65%
Swing	▲0.10	▼5.42
TPP	54.20%	45.80%
TPP swing	▲4.90	▼4.90
- Results by division for the House of Representatives, shaded by winning party's margin of victory.
Prime Minister before election
Robert Menzies
Liberal/Country coalition
Subsequent Prime Minister
Robert Menzies
Liberal/Country coalition

A federal election was held in Australia on 10 December 1955. All 122 seats in the House of Representatives and 30 of the 60 seats in the Senate were up for election. An early election was called to bring the House and Senate elections back in line; the previous election in 1954 had been House-only. The incumbent Liberal–Country coalition led by Prime Minister Robert Menzies increased its majority over the opposition Labor Party, led by H. V. Evatt.

Future Prime Minister Malcolm Fraser and future opposition leader Billy Snedden both entered parliament at this election.

== Results ==
=== House of Representatives ===
Labor: 47 seats Liberal: 56 seats Country: 18 seats

House of Reps (IRV) — 1955–58—Turnout 95.00% (CV) — Informal 2.88%
Party	First preference votes	%	Swing	Seats	Change
Liberal–Country coalition	2,093,430	47.67	+0.10	75	+11
Liberal	1,745,985	39.75	+0.75	57	+10
Country	347,445	7.91	–0.66	18	+1
Labor	1,961,359	44.65	–5.42	49 (Note: Including Northern Territory and Australian Capital Territory)	–10
Anti-Communist Labor	227,083	5.17	+5.17	0	0
Communist	51,001	1.16	–0.09	0	0
Independents	60,042	1.37	+0.26	0	0
Total	4,392,915			122	+1
Two-party-preferred (estimated)
Liberal–Country coalition	Win	54.20	+4.90	75	+11
Labor		45.80	−4.90	49	−10

- Ten members were elected unopposed – five Liberal and five Country. This would be the last federal election where any seat attracted only one candidate.

First preference vote
Labor	44.65%
Liberal	39.75%
Country	7.91%
ALP AC	5.17%
Independent	1.37%
Communist	1.16%

Two-party-preferred vote
Coalition	54.20%
Labor	45.80%

Parliament seats
Coalition	61.48%
Labor	38.52%

=== Senate ===
Senate (STV) — 1955–58—Turnout 95.01% (CV) — Informal 9.63%
Party	First preference votes	%	Swing	Seats won	Seats held	Change
Liberal–Country coalition	2,161,460	48.68	+4.25	17	30	–1
Liberal–Country joint ticket	1,748,878	39.38	+12.93	8	N/A	N/A
Liberal	384,732	8.66	–9.32	8	24	–2
Country	27,850	0.63	+0.63	1	6	+1
Labor	1,803,335	40.61	–10.00	12	28	–1
Anti-Communist Labor	271,067	6.10	+6.10	1	2	+2
Communist	161,869	3.64	+0.59	0	0	0
Henry George Justice	3,366	0.08	–0.22	0	0	0
Independents	39,928	0.90	+0.36	0	0	0
Total	4,441,025			30	60	

== Seats changing hands ==
Seat	Pre-1955			Swing	Post-1955		
Seat	Party	Member	Margin	Swing	Margin	Member	Party
Ballaarat, Vic	Labor	Bob Joshua*	2.6	10.7	7.9	Dudley Erwin	Liberal
Hume, NSW	Labor	Arthur Fuller	2,2	3.5	2.2	Charles Anderson	Country
Maribyrnong, Vic	Labor	Arthur Drakeford	16.1	7.5	0.1	Philip Stokes	Liberal
Perth, WA	Labor	Tom Burke	2.3	3.8	1.5	Fred Chaney	Liberal
Philip, NSW	Labor	Joe Fitzgerald	8.9	5.7	1.1	William Aston	Liberal
St George, NSW	Labor	Nelson Lemmon	2.7	5.8	3.4	Bill Graham	Liberal

- Bob Joshua contested his seat as a candidate for the Australian Labor Party (Anti-Communist).

== See also ==
- Candidates of the 1955 Australian federal election
- Members of the Australian House of Representatives, 1955–1958
- Members of the Australian Senate, 1956–1959
