= 1979 Grayndler by-election =

A by-election was held for the Australian House of Representatives seat of Grayndler on 23 June 1979. It was triggered by the death of Labor Party MP Frank Stewart.

The by-election was won by Labor candidate Leo McLeay, the assistant general secretary of the state's Labor branch.

== Results ==
1979 Grayndler by-election
Party	Candidate	Votes	%	±%
Labor	Leo McLeay	30,764	61.8	+4.1
Liberal	Vassil Vassiliou	12,161	24.4	−9.0
Democrats	Stephen Kirkham	1,848	3.7	−3.5
Voice of the Elderly	Stanley Duncan	1,845	3.7	+3.7
Independent	Charles Bellchambers	1,051	2.1	+2.1
Australian National Alliance	Frank Salter	863	1.7	+0.0
Socialist	Frank Vouros	665	1.3	−0.4
Socialist Workers	Juanita Keig	591	1.2	+1.2
Total formal votes		49,788	94.7	
Informal votes		2,806	5.3	
Turnout		52,594	77.7	
Two-party-preferred result
Labor	Leo McLeay		69.2	+7.0
Liberal	Vassil Vassiliou		30.8	−7.0
Labor hold		Swing	+7.0	
