= Joe Riordan =

Australian politician

The Honourable Joe Riordan AO
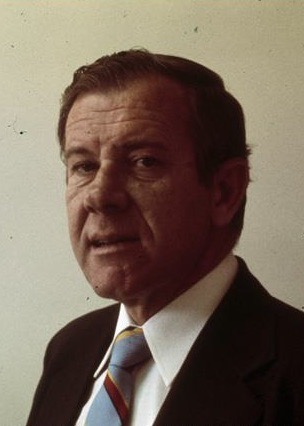

Minister for Housing and Construction
- In office 6 June 1975 – 11 November 1975
- Prime Minister: Gough Whitlam
- Preceded by: Les Johnson
- Succeeded by: John Carrick

Member of the Australian Parliament for Phillip
- In office 2 December 1972 – 13 December 1975
- Preceded by: William Aston
- Succeeded by: Jack Birney

Personal details
- Born: 27 February 1930 Sydney
- Died: 19 November 2012 (aged 82) Sydney
- Party: Australian Labor Party
- Spouse: Patricia Watkins
- Relations: 6 children = John Riordan, Peter Riordan, Michael Riordan, Bernie Riordan, Cathy Riordan and Maureen Riordan And 14 Grandchildren
- Occupation: Clerk

Joseph Martin Riordan AO (27 February 1930 – 19 November 2012) was an Australian politician and briefly government minister.

== Early years ==
Riordan was born in Sydney, raised as a Catholic, and educated at Patrician Brothers School and Marist Brother College in that city. From 1958 to 1972 he was Federal Secretary of the Federated Clerks' Union (a stronghold of anti-Communist social democrats).

== Career ==
Riordan was elected as the Australian Labor Party member for the House of Representatives seat of Phillip at the 1972 election, defeating the Liberal, William Aston. He was Minister for Housing and Construction from June 1975 until the dismissal of the Whitlam Government in November 1975. He was defeated by the Liberals' Jack Birney at the 1975 election.

Riordan was Senior Deputy President of the Australian Industrial Relations Commission from 1986 to 1995. He was made an Officer of the Order of Australia (AO) in January 1995 for "service to industrial relations, to social justice and to the Community".

== Death ==
He died on 19 November 2012, aged 82.

== Personal life ==
He was the nephew of Darby Riordan, the Labor member of the House of Representatives for Kennedy from 1929 to 1936.

== Notes ==
Political offices
Preceded by Les Johnson	Minister for Housing and Construction; 1975	Succeeded by John Carrick
Parliament of Australia
Preceded by William Aston	Member for Phillip; 1972–1975	Succeeded by Jack Birney
