= William Aston =

Australian politician (1916–1997)

The Honourable Sir William Aston KCMG
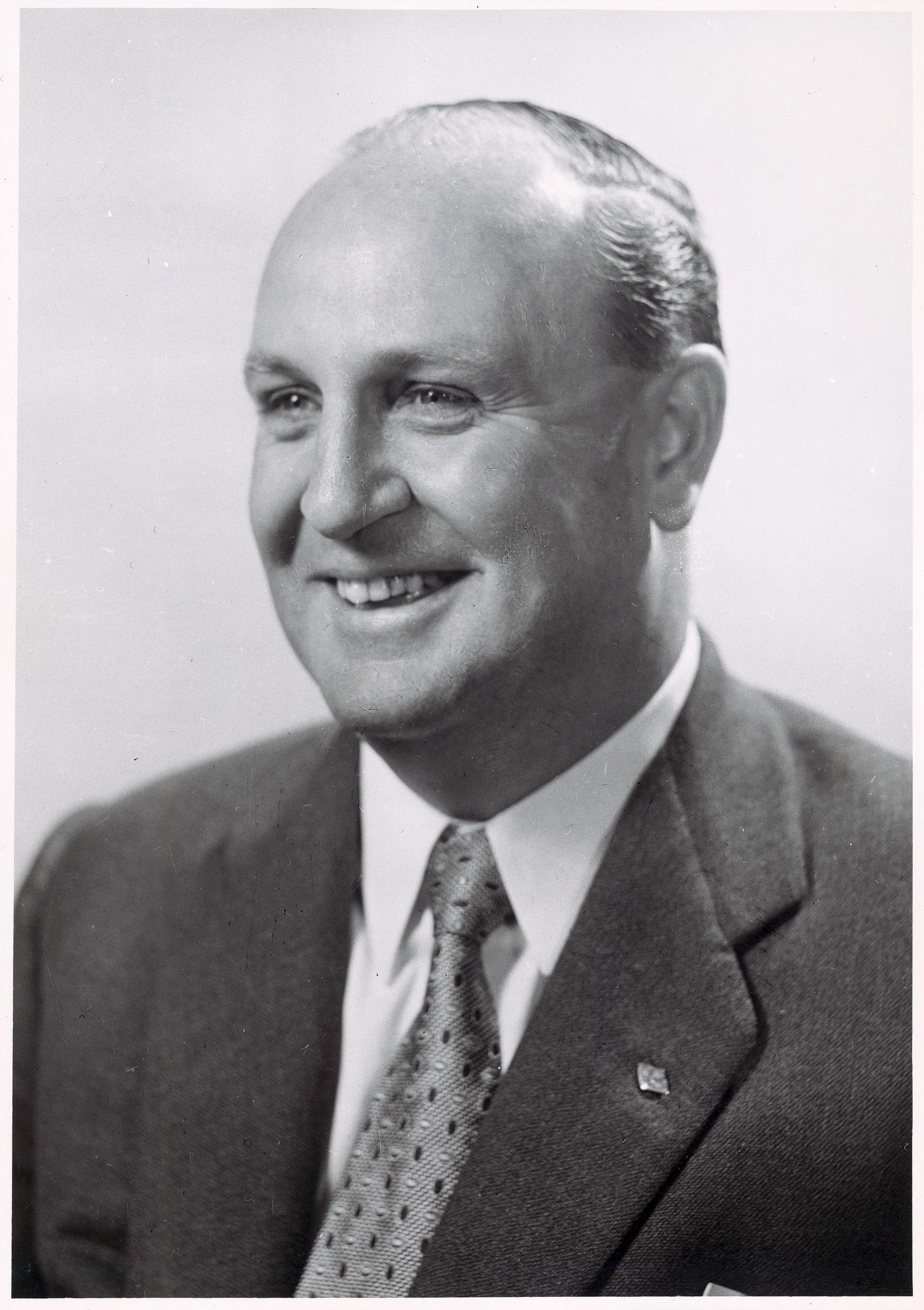
- Aston in 1963

14th Speaker of the Australian House of Representatives
- In office 21 February 1967 – 2 November 1972
- Preceded by: Sir John McLeay
- Succeeded by: Jim Cope

Member of the Australian Parliament for Phillip
- In office 10 December 1955 – 9 December 1961
- Preceded by: Joe Fitzgerald
- Succeeded by: Syd Einfeld
- In office 30 November 1963 – 2 December 1972
- Preceded by: Syd Einfeld
- Succeeded by: Joe Riordan

Personal details
- Born: 19 September 1916 Mascot, New South Wales, Australia
- Died: 21 May 1997 (aged 80) Vaucluse, New South Wales, Australia
- Party: Liberal
- Spouse: Betty Burrett (m. 1941)
- Relations: Ray Aston (son)
- Occupation: Businessman

Sir William John Aston, KCMG (19 September 1916 – 21 May 1997) was an Australian politician. Born in Sydney, he attended state schools before becoming an accountant and company director. He served in World War II from 1942 to 1944, and was involved in local politics as a member of Waverley Council. In 1955, he was elected to the Australian House of Representatives as the Liberal member for Phillip. He held the seat until 1961, when he was defeated by Syd Einfeld of the Labor Party. Aston returned to the House in 1963, defeating Einfeld. On 21 February 1967 Aston was elected Speaker. He held this position until the Liberal Government's defeat at the hands of Gough Whitlam in 1972, when Aston lost his seat. He died in 1997.

== Early life ==
Aston was born on 19 September 1916 in Mascot, New South Wales. He was the son of Annie (née McKeown) and Harold John Aston; his father worked as a barber.

Aston's family struggled financially during the Great Depression. His mother worked as a washerwoman and he was sent to live with his aunt Ethel George – his father's sister – for a period. He later recalled that "she had a greater influence on me than any other person".

Aston grew up in the suburb of Waverley and began his education at Waverley Public School. He went on to attend Randwick Boys High School, where he was influenced by his economics and business teacher Hermann Black. After leaving school he obtained an accounting qualification and began working for clothing manufacturer Jones Brothers Ltd. as a clerk. He later worked as a travelling salesman, visiting country department stores.

== Military service and post-war work ==
In 1940, Aston was mobilised into the Citizen Military Forces. He transferred to the Australian Imperial Force in 1942 as a gunner. He was commissioned as a lieutenant in 1943 and saw service in New Guinea as a member of the 82nd Australian Mobile Searchlight Battery. He returned to Australia in 1944 and was discharged later that year.

After the war's end, Aston and his wife established their own millinery business, Astyle Pty Ltd. He was active in the Returned Sailors', Soldiers' and Airmen's Imperial League of Australia and in 1948 was elected president of its Bronte branch. He served on the Waverley Municipal Council from 1949 to 1953, including as mayor from 1952 to 1953.

== Politics ==
At the 1955 federal election, Aston won the seat of Phillip for the Liberal Party from the incumbent Australian Labor Party (ALP) MP Joe Fitzgerald. He was re-elected in 1958 and joined the Joint Parliamentary Committee on Foreign Affairs, also serving as a deputy government whip from 1960. However, at the 1961 election he was defeated in Phillip by ALP candidate Syd Einfeld. He regained Phillip for the Liberal Party at the 1963 election and was reappointed as deputy government whip, replacing Peter Howson as government whip in 1964.

Aston was a strong supporter of Israel, in line with his electorate's large Jewish population. After the Six-Day War of 1967 he opposed the Rogers Plan and supported the right of Israel to retain its captured territory. He helped convince foreign minister William McMahon to make more explicitly pro-Israel statements, following concerns expressed by Israeli contacts. Aston made an official visit to Israel in 1969 and 1971, after which he was described by the Jerusalem Post as "one of Israel's most faithful and devoted friends in Australia". He was an honorary commander in Betar, a Zionist youth movement, while his wife was a life governor of the Women's International Zionist Organization. In 1971 he officially opened the first annual conference of the Executive Council of Australian Jewry at the new National Jewish Memorial Centre in Canberra.

=== Speaker of the House ===
Aston was elected speaker of the House of Representatives on 21 February 1967, replacing John McLeay who had retired after the 1966 election. Prior to his election he had defeated eight other contestants for the Liberal Party's nomination. He remained in office until his defeat at the 1972 election, after which he retired from politics.

As speaker, Aston was an advocate for the extension of question time and for the expansion of the House's committee system along the lines of the Senate committees. In his advocacy for the latter he came into conflict with Prime Minister John Gorton. Aston's proposed procedural reforms were included in a report of the House Standing Orders Committee which he delivered as ex officio chairman in September 1970. The House did not accept some of the major changes proposed, but did adopt recommendations for shorter speaking times and reduced quorums.

Aston came into conflict with the ALP opposition on a number of occasions. Following his re-election as speaker in 1969, ALP frontbenchers Kim Beazley and Clyde Cameron accused him as being a "lackey of the prime minister [Gorton]". In April 1970, Aston named ALP MP Gordon Bryant for insulting him, following which Bryant's ALP colleagues crowded around him to prevent his removal by the serjeant-at-arms. The situation was resolved the following day after intervention from ALP leader Gough Whitlam. In April 1971, Aston was the subject of a no-confidence motion from the opposition, with ALP deputy leader Lance Barnard describing him as "arbitrary, capricious, inconsistent and undeniably partisan". The motion was defeated on party lines.

One of the most significant incidents involving Aston occurred in March 1971, when journalist Alan Ramsey shouted "you liar!" at Gorton from the press gallery of the House of Representatives. Whitlam subsequently moved that Ramsey be imprisoned for contempt of parliament, but this was avoided when Aston assisted Ramsey in drafting an apology.

== Personal life ==
In 1941, Aston married Betty Burrett, a milliner. The couple had three children, including Ray Aston who served in the New South Wales Legislative Assembly from 1986 until his death in 1988.

Aston suffered from dementia in later life. He died of heart failure in Vaucluse, New South Wales, on 21 May 1997, aged 80.

Civic offices
Preceded by Ken Weekes	Mayor of Waverley; 1951–1953	Succeeded by Carl Jeppesen
Parliament of Australia
Preceded by Sir John McLeay	Speaker of the Australian House of Representatives; 1967–1972	Succeeded by Jim Cope
Preceded by Joe Fitzgerald	Member for Phillip; 1955–1961	Succeeded by Syd Einfeld
Preceded by Syd Einfeld	Member for Phillip; 1963–1972	Succeeded by Joe Riordan
