= Jack Birney =

Australian politician (1928–1995)

Member of the Australian Parliament for Phillip
- In office 13 December 1975 – 5 March 1983
- Preceded by: Joe Riordan
- Succeeded by: Jeannette McHugh

Personal details
- Born: 26 September 1927 Sydney, Australia
- Died: 1 January 1995 (aged 66) Coolah, New South Wales, Australia
- Party: Liberal
- Spouse: Betty Ann Parnell (m.1951) Shirley Kirk (m. 1965,) Toni McRae (m. 1972)
- Relations: Kathy Birney (daughter) David Birney (son) David Coe Birney (son) Chris Birney (son) Suzanne Birney (daughter) Matt Birney (son)
- Occupation: Barrister

Reginald John Birney (26 September 1927 – 1 January 1995) was an Australian barrister and politician. He was a member of the Liberal Party and was in the House of Representatives from 1975 to 1983, representing the New South Wales seat of Phillip.

== Early life ==
Birney was born in Sydney on 26 September 1927.

Birney was a barrister before entering politics. In 1963 he represented Geoffrey Chandler at the inquest into the Bogle–Chandler case, which involved the mysterious death of Chandler's wife. Later that year he represented accused serial killer William MacDonald, mounting an unsuccessful insanity defence.

== Politics ==
In 1962 Birney was a vice-president of the United Australia Movement, which campaigned for the Territory of Papua and New Guinea to be granted representation in federal parliament and for Australian annexation of Dutch New Guinea. He visited Port Moresby where he spoke on "the immediacy of the Indonesian threat to East New Guinea", and with solicitor Bruce Miles was subsequently involved with the New Guinea Party which stood candidates at the 1963 federal election.

Birney was elected to the New South Wales state council of the Liberal Party in 1974. He was elected to the House of Representatives at the 1975 federal election, winning the seat of Phillip from the incumbent Australian Labor Party (ALP) MP Joe Riordan.

Birney was reportedly an "enthusiastic backbencher" with "a talent for getting his name in print, usually as a champion of the bizarre or the sanctimonious". He was one of the few Liberal MPs to oppose the construction of the Franklin Dam in Tasmania. He suffered a heart attack while visiting the protest site in 1983.

Birney was re-elected at the 1977 and 1980 elections, but lost his seat to the ALP candidate Jeanette McHugh as the Coalition was defeated at the 1983 election. He was later an unsuccessful preselection candidate for the New South Wales Legislative Council prior to the 1984 New South Wales state election.

== Later life ==
Birney returned to his legal practice following the end of his parliamentary career. In 1984 he represented Lebanese organised crime figure Frank Hakim at a special commission inquiry into alleged bribery of the state prisons minister Rex Jackson, which ultimately led to Jackson's imprisonment.

== Personal life ==
Birney's first marriage was to Betty Ann Parnell. He later married Shirley Kirk and Toni McRae. He had a total of six children across his marriages, including Matt Birney who briefly served as leader of the Liberal Party in Western Australia.

Birney died in his sleep on 1 January 1995, aged 66, while on holiday at Coolah, New South Wales.

Parliament of Australia
| Preceded by Joseph Riordan | Member for Phillip; 1975–1983 | Succeeded by Jeannette McHugh |
