= Leo McLeay =

Australian politician (born 1945)

The Honourable Leo McLeay

20th Speaker of the Australian House of Representatives
- In office 29 August 1989 – 8 February 1993
- Preceded by: Joan Child
- Succeeded by: Stephen Martin

Member of the Australian Parliament for Grayndler
- In office 23 June 1979 – 13 March 1993
- Preceded by: Frank Stewart
- Succeeded by: Jeannette McHugh

Member of the Australian Parliament for Watson
- In office 13 March 1993 – 31 August 2004
- Preceded by: New seat
- Succeeded by: Tony Burke

Personal details
- Born: 4 October 1945 (age 81) Marrickville, New South Wales, Australia
- Party: Labor
- Spouse: Janice Delaney (m. 1969)
- Children: Paul McLeay
- Occupation: Telephone technician

Leo Boyce McLeay (born 4 October 1945) is a former Australian politician. He was a member of the Australian Labor Party (ALP) and served in the House of Representatives from 1979 to 2004, including as speaker of the House from 1989 to 1993.

McLeay was raised in Sydney and after leaving school worked as a telephone technician for the Postmaster-General's Department. He was active in the labour movement and joined the ALP at a young age, serving as state secretary of Young Labor and later working as a paid organiser and assistant general secretary. McLeay was elected to parliament at the 1979 Grayndler by-election. He served as chairman of committees (1986–1989) before succeeding Joan Child as speaker. McLeay was involved in a number of reforms as speaker, including the introduction of television broadcasts of parliamentary proceedings. He resigned in 1993 following a controversy over an injury compensation payout he received for a bicycle hired from Parliament House. He later served as Labor's chief whip from 1993 to 2001.

== Early life ==
McLeay was born on 4 October 1945 in Marrickville, New South Wales. He was the older of two children born to Joan Ann and Ronald Boyce McLeay. His father was a council worker and worked on the construction of the Sydney Harbour Bridge.

McLeay attended De La Salle College, Marrickville. He left school before obtaining a leaving certificate and began working as a post office telegram boy. In 1962 he joined the Postmaster-General's Department as a telephone technician, receiving further training at North Sydney Technical College. He was a member of the Postal Telecommunication Technicians' Association and the Federated Clerks' Union.

== Early political career ==
McLeay joined the ALP at the age of 13 and was state secretary of Young Labor in 1969. He served on the Marrickville Municipal Council from 1971 to 1977. He became a paid ALP employee with the support of Graham Richardson, initially as an organiser and then as assistant general secretary of the state branch from 1976 to 1979.

McLeay was elected to federal parliament at the 1979 Grayndler by-election, following the death in office of Frank Stewart. He was re-elected to the House of Representatives on ten further occasions. In 1993 he transferred from the seat of Grayndler to the newly created seat of Watson. His transfer was due to the abolition of the seat of Phillip, which caused incumbent government minister Jeanette McHugh to move to Grayndler.

McLeay was active across a number of parliamentary committees. In 1982 he chaired the subcommittee that delivered the In a Home or at Home report on aged care. He was also chair of the House Standing Committee on Expenditure from 1983 to 1986. He was elected chairman of committees in 1986, serving as deputy to house speaker Joan Child.

== Speaker of the House, 1989–1993 ==
On 29 August 1989, McLeay was elected speaker of the House of Representatives following Child's retirement. His goals included reforms to the parliamentary committee systems and a modernisation of the administration of parliament.

McLeay oversaw the introduction of televised proceedings of the House, beginning with a six-month trial in February 1991. After the trial's conclusion he chaired a select committee which unanimously recommended that television broadcasts continue. In October 1992, the House adopted several reforms supported by McLeay, including the creation of a formal role of deputy speaker (to be held by the chairman of committees), additional time for private members' business and conversion of various sessional orders to standing orders. He also implemented a smoking ban in Parliament House.

McLeay remained active in the ALP caucus during his time as speaker and served as Paul Keating's campaign manager for the leadership spills against Prime Minister Bob Hawke in 1991. He was the subject of an unsuccessful no-confidence motion in April 1992 over allegations of bias, which was defeated on party lines.

=== Bicycle controversy and resignation ===
In December 1992, it was reported that McLeay had been paid $65,000 (equivalent to $100,000 in 2022) by a parliamentary body in relation to an elbow injury he sustained after falling off a collapsible bicycle. The compensation comprised $55,000 in medical costs and $10,000 in legal fees. McLeay had hired the bicycle from the Parliament House gymnasium in April 1990. It collapsed underneath him while he was riding, in part due to the fact that he had exceeded the bicycle's 100 kilograms (220 lb) weight limit.

McLeay's compensation claim was a source of political controversy in the lead-up to the federal election due in March 1993, with the federal opposition alleging that a conflict of interest existed and he had received favourable treatment. The award was made by the Joint House Department, a body which McLeay administered as speaker alongside Senate president Kerry Sibraa. The compensation paid took into account future economic loss in employment prospects, although McLeay had not taken any time off due to the injury. It was also reported that McLeay's claim had been processed and settled more quickly than similar claims, which had taken years to resolve or resulted in no compensation being paid. On 1 February 1993, the Australian Democrats announced that it would support a Senate inquiry into the handling of the claim.

On 3 February 1993, McLeay announced his resignation as speaker, which took effect on 8 February, the date Parliament was dissolved for the election. On the same date, federal attorney-general Michael Duffy announced that it had appointed Laurence Street to conduct an independent inquiry into the compensation claim. Street's report was delivered on 19 February. It found no evidence of impropriety and concluded that the compensation paid was fair, as McLeay had not been advised of the bicycle's weight limit and his elbow injury had restricted his ability to play golf and tennis. McLeay stated that he had been a victim of a "vicious campaign of lies" and "not done anything that I should be even slightly embarrassed about".

== Final years in politics ==
After his resignation as speaker, McLeay was appointed as government whip on 24 March 1993. His title was changed to chief government whip on 12 May 1994, following the addition of a second whip, and he later served as chief opposition whip until the 2001 federal election. He retired from parliament at the 2004 election.

McLeay resumed his involvement in committee work and took a particular interest in national security, serving on the joint committees relating to ASIO. He was also chair of the Joint Statutory Committee on Corporations and Securities from 1996 to 1998 and deputy chair of the House Standing Committee on Privileges from 2002 to 2004.

McLeay supported Australian recognition of the State of Palestine. He was co-chair of Parliamentary Friends of Palestine for a period, alongside Liberal MP Ross Cameron. In 2003, McLeay and another pro-Palestinian backbencher Julia Irwin came into conflict with ALP leader Simon Crean when he refused them permission to speak on a parliamentary debate on the Middle East. Irwin stated that Crean's decision was at the behest of Jeremy Jones, the president of the Executive Council of Australian Jewry, who had previously been publicly criticised by McLeay.

== Later career ==
After leaving parliament McLeay became a director of the Mary MacKillop Foundation in 2005. He was also the New South Wales director of the Enhance Group, a government relations group with Jim Elder and Chris Ellison as other directors. In 2009, it was reported that he was a registered lobbyist for Enhance Corporate, with one of his clients being Serco.

== Personal life ==
In 1969, McLeay married Janice Delaney, a schoolteacher, with whom he had three sons. His son Paul McLeay was a member of the New South Wales Legislative Assembly from 2003 to 2011.

Parliament of Australia
Preceded by Joan Child	Speaker of the Australian House of Representatives; 1989–1993	Succeeded by Stephen Martin
Preceded by Frank Stewart	Member for Grayndler; 1979–1993	Succeeded by Jeannette McHugh
New division	Member for Watson; 1993–2004	Succeeded by Tony Burke
