= Joe Fitzgerald (politician) =

Australian politician

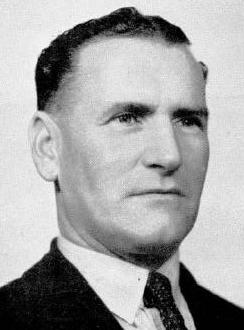

Member of the Australian Parliament for Phillip
- In office 10 December 1949 – 10 December 1955
- Preceded by: New seat
- Succeeded by: William Aston

Senator for New South Wales
- In office 1 July 1962 – 11 April 1974

Personal details
- Born: 6 February 1912 Randwick, Sydney, New South Wales, Australia
- Died: 1 November 1985 (aged 73) Randwick, Sydney, New South Wales, Australia
- Party: Australian Labor Party
- Occupation: Public servant

Joseph Francis Fitzgerald (6 February 1912 – 1 November 1985) was an Australian politician. He was an Australian Labor Party member of the Australian House of Representatives for the Sydney seat of Phillip from 1949 to 1955 and a member of the Australian Senate for New South Wales from 1961 to 1974.

Fitzgerald was born in Sydney and educated at Christian Brothers College, Waverley and Paddington Junior Technical School. He worked at the Eveleigh Railway Workshops and then for the Metropolitan Water Sewerage and Drainage Board, which stationed him at their Leichhardt depot from 1939 and seconded him to the federal deputy director of Manpower from 1942 to 1946. From 1948, he worked in the federal Department of Labour and National Service. He was an active member of the Labor Party for many years, serving as a member of the party's state central executive from 1941 to 1948 and 1956 to 1961, a member of the central organising committee for twelve years, secretary of the Waverley electorate council for 25 years, and a long-serving secretary of the Randwick North branch and president of the Waverley branch.

Fitzgerald was elected to the House of Representatives at the 1949 federal election and re-elected in 1952 and 1954. He was referred to as "one of [the] most convinced supporters" of left-wing Labor leader H. V. Evatt and staunchly defended him in the tensions leading up to the 1955 Labor split. He vocally opposed an attempted spill against Evatt in late 1954, and became secretary to the Parliamentary Labor Party in 1955. Fitzgerald was defeated in 1955 amidst a bad nationwide Labor loss and an electoral redistribution that significantly cut his margin in Phillip.

After his election defeat, Fitzgerald was the assistant private secretary to Evatt from 1956 to 1960, and one of two of Evatt's staff retained by Arthur Calwell when he assumed the leadership in 1960, remaining in the role for Calwell until his election to the Senate in 1961. He was the unsuccessful Labor candidate for his old House seat in 1958.

In 1961, he was elected to the Senate after winning top position on the Labor ticket. In 1967, he was relegated to third position on the Labor Senate ticket after what Kerry Sibraa described as "the most keenly fought preselections in New South Wales Labor Party history", but unexpectedly won re-election anyway. He suffered a serious stroke in 1971 and retired due to ill health in 1974.

After his Senate retirement, he served as a member of the National Advisory Committee for the Handicapped from 1974 to 1980. He was made a life member of the Labor Party in 1979. He died in 1985.

Parliament of Australia
Division created	Member for Phillip; 1949–1955	Succeeded by William Aston
