= Frank Stewart =

Australian politician

The Honourable Frank Stewart
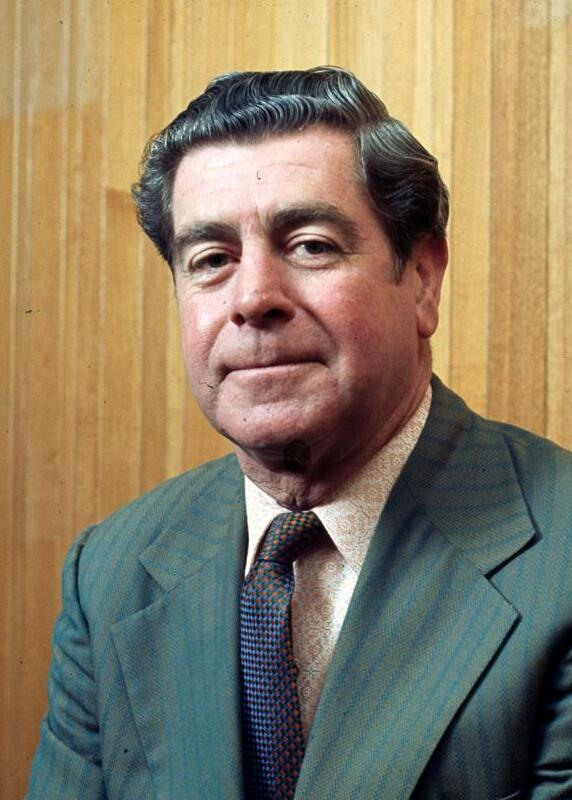
- Stewart in 1973

Vice-President of the Executive Council Minister for Tourism and Recreation
- In office 30 November 1973 – 11 November 1975
- Prime Minister: Gough Whitlam
- Preceded by: Peter Howson
- Succeeded by: Reg Withers

Member of the Australian Parliament for Lang
- In office 29 August 1953 – 10 December 1977
- Preceded by: Dan Mulcahy
- Succeeded by: Seat abolished

Member of the Australian Parliament for Grayndler
- In office 10 December 1977 – 16 April 1979
- Preceded by: Tony Whitlam
- Succeeded by: Leo McLeay

Personal details
- Born: 20 February 1923 Belmore, New South Wales
- Died: 16 April 1979 (aged 56) Long Jetty, New South Wales
- Party: Australian Labor Party
- Spouse: Maureen Neagle Smith
- Relations: Kevin Stewart
- Occupation: Soldier

Military service
- Branch/service: Second AIF
- Years of service: 1944, 1945
- Rank: Sergeant
- Unit: 39th Transport Platoon

Francis Eugene Stewart (20 February 1923 – 16 April 1979) was an Australian politician. He was a member of the Australian Labor Party (ALP) and served as Minister for Tourism and Recreation in the Whitlam government from 1973 to 1975. He was a member of the House of Representatives representing Lang from 1953 to 1977 and subsequently Grayndler from 1977 until his death in 1979.

== Early life and army career ==
Stewart was born in the Sydney suburb of Belmore and educated at St Joseph's School, Belmore and St Mary's Cathedral College, Sydney. Before World War II, he was a public servant in the New South Wales Department of Transport. In the war, he served in the Second Australian Imperial Force in New Guinea with the 39th Transport Platoon in 1944 and 1945 and was eventually promoted to sergeant. Prior to his election to parliament, he played first grade rugby league for Canterbury Bankstown Bulldogs between 1948 and 1950. He married Maureen Neagle Smith in August 1952.

== Political career ==
Having been a member of the ALP since 1942, Stewart was elected as the federal member for Lang in 1953. Belonging to the right-wing Catholic faction of the party, he was widely considered a grouper, although unlike many other "groupers" he never left the Labor Party.

When Gough Whitlam became prime minister in 1972, Stewart was appointed Minister for Tourism and Recreation. He strongly opposed both the legalising of abortion and the no-fault divorce reform which became law in 1975.

As Vice-President of the Executive Council, in 1975, Stewart presided over the meeting that revoked Rex Connor's authority to raise overseas funds. The Sydney Morning Herald later published allegations that he was so concerned about Connor dealings with Tirath Khemlani as to have leaked information to the opposition on the Loans Affair.

After the fall of the Whitlam government, Stewart moved to the backbench. When Lang was abolished prior to the 1977 election, he transferred to Grayndler. He died in Long Jetty, New South Wales, of a heart attack while playing squash and was survived by his wife, five daughters and one son. Kevin Stewart (1928–2006), Health Minister in the New South Wales government led by Neville Wran, was Frank's younger brother.

=== Australian Institute of Sport ===
As Minister for Tourism and Recreation, in 1974 Stewart appointed a study group to report on the feasibility of establishing an Australian sports institute. Released in 1975, the report recommended the establishment of a sports institute, now known as the Australian Institute of Sport (AIS). One of the buildings at the AIS is named after Frank Stewart in recognition of the central role he played in the institute's establishment.

== Rugby league ==
Patrick Francis Stewart, the father of both Kevin and Frank Stewart, was the founding president of the Canterbury Bankstown Leagues Club. The Stewart family have been long-term supporters of the Canterbury Bankstown Bulldogs and Frank played first-grade rugby league for the Bulldogs from 1948 to 1950. In recognition of this support, the grandstand at Belmore Sports Ground (the former home ground of the club) is named the "Stewart Stand" after Patrick, Frank, and Kevin Stewart.

Following an incident where Canterbury Bankstown Bulldogs football club was stripped of all points in the National Rugby League competition for breach of the salary cap, Kevin Stewart was appointed chairman of the board in 2002 in an attempt to restore the club's reputation.

== Notes ==
Political offices
Preceded by Peter Howson	Minister for Tourism and Recreation; 1972–75	Succeeded by Reg Withers
Preceded by Don Willesee	Vice-President of the Executive Council; 1972–75	Succeeded by Reg Withers
Parliament of Australia
Preceded by Dan Mulcahy	Member for Lang; 1953–77	Division abolished
Preceded by Tony Whitlam	Member for Grayndler; 1977–79	Succeeded by Leo McLeay
