= Jeannette McHugh =

Australian politician

The Honourable Jeannette McHugh
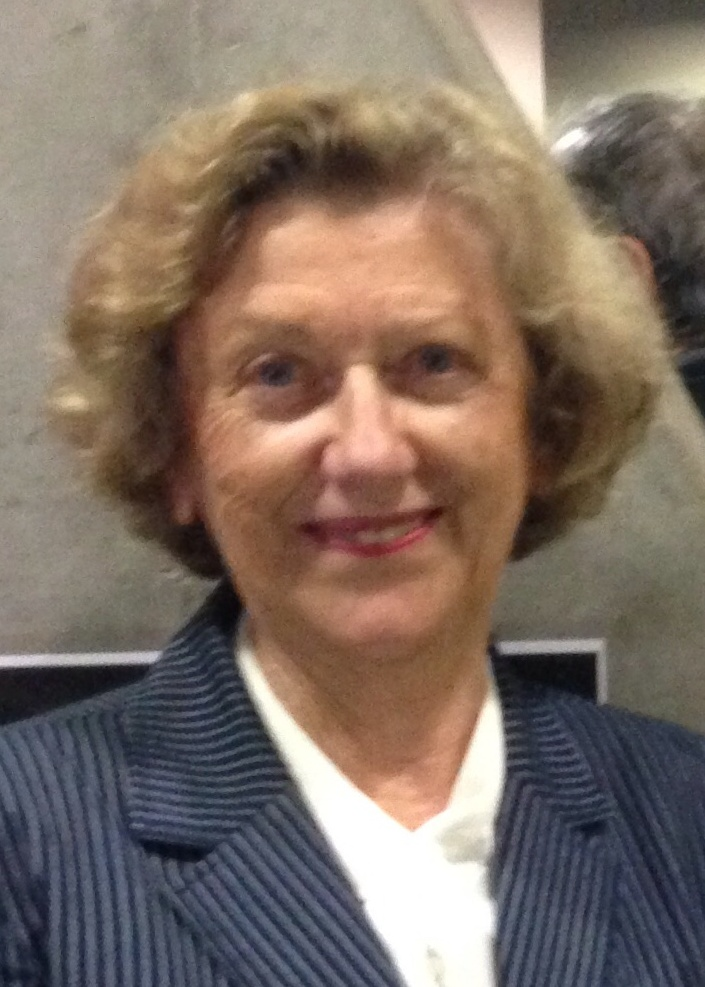
- McHugh in 2014

Minister for Consumer Affairs
- In office 27 May 1992 – 11 March 1996
- Prime Minister: Paul Keating
- Preceded by: Michael Tate
- Succeeded by: Geoff Prosser

Member of the Australian Parliament
- In office 13 March 1993 – 2 March 1996
- Preceded by: Leo McLeay
- Succeeded by: Anthony Albanese
- Constituency: Grayndler
- In office 5 March 1983 – 13 March 1993
- Preceded by: Jack Birney
- Succeeded by: Seat abolished
- Constituency: Phillip

Personal details
- Born: Jeannette Goffet; 18 December 1934 (age 91) Kandos, New South Wales, Australia
- Party: Labor
- Spouse: Michael McHugh (m. 1960)
- Education: University of Sydney
- Occupation: Teacher

Jeannette McHugh (née Goffet; born 18 December 1934) is an Australian former politician who was the first woman from New South Wales elected to federal parliament. She served in the House of Representatives from 1983 to 1996, representing the Australian Labor Party (ALP), and was Minister for Consumer Affairs in the Keating government from 1992 to 1996. She was a schoolteacher and political activist prior to entering parliament.

== Early life and education ==
Born in Kandos, New South Wales, McHugh was educated at the University of Sydney, where she resided at the Women's College.

== Career ==
=== Early career ===
She worked as a languages teacher and on social justice issues for many years through her involvement in housing, environment, anti-nuclear, peace and women's organisations before gaining ALP pre-selection for the Division of Phillip, a seat she won at the 1983 Australian federal election, making her the first woman from New South Wales to sit in the federal parliament.

=== Parliamentary career ===
She was made Minister for Consumer Affairs in 1992, making her the first female federal minister from New South Wales. When the Division of Phillip was abolished after an electoral redistribution, it was arranged for McHugh to move to the Division of Grayndler, as she was entitled to a seat as a minister. The sitting member Leo McLeay agreed to move to the new neighbouring electorate of Watson.

McHugh announced her retirement from parliament, to be effective at the time of the 1996 Australian federal election, at which the ALP lost government. Anthony Albanese won pre-selection for Grayndler, and retained the seat for Labor at the election. McHugh was a member of Labor's Left faction.

=== Post-parliamentary career ===
McHugh is Chair of the Jessie Street Trust, and was Secretary of the Evatt Foundation until November 2006.

== Personal life ==
Jeannette McHugh is married to former High Court of Australia justice Michael McHugh.

Her parents were Charles Richard "Charlie" Goffet (1909–91), who taught French at Newcastle Boys High School from 1942 to 1978, and Neta Jean Goffet (née Walsh) (1909–83) Her younger sister is former Labor and Independent local councillor and Mayor of Warringah, Julie Sutton.

Parliament of Australia
Preceded by Jack Birney	Member for Phillip; 1983–1993	Division abolished
Preceded by Leo McLeay	Member for Grayndler; 1993–1996	Succeeded by Anthony Albanese
Political offices
Preceded by Michael Tate as Justice and Consumer Affairs	Minister for Consumer Affairs; 1992–1996	Succeeded by Geoff Prosser as Small Business and Consumer Affairs
