= Division of Grayndler =

Australian federal electoral division

Coordinates: 33.897°S 151.148°E

Grayndler Australian House of Representatives Division
- Interactive map of electorate boundaries from the 2025 federal election
- Created: 1949
- MP: Anthony Albanese
- Party: Labor
- Namesake: Ted Grayndler
- Electors: 125,576 (2025)
- Area: 34 km^{2} (13.1 sq mi)
- Demographic: Inner metropolitan
Electorates around Grayndler:
Reid	Reid	Sydney
Watson	Grayndler	Sydney
Barton	Barton	Kingsford Smith

The Division of Grayndler is an Australian electoral division in Sydney, New South Wales. It is currently represented by Prime Minister of Australia and Leader of the Australian Labor Party Anthony Albanese.

Grayndler covers most of Sydney's Inner West Council. The electorate includes the suburbs of Leichhardt, Lilyfield, Petersham, Lewisham, Enmore, Haberfield, Summer Hill and parts of Newtown, Ashfield, Dulwich Hill, Marrickville, and Tempe.

The current MP has been Anthony Albanese since 1996, who has served as Prime Minister of Australia since 2022 and Leader of the Australian Labor Party since 2019.

== History ==
The division was created in 1949 and is named for Ted Grayndler (1867–1943), a Member of the New South Wales Legislative Council from 1921 to 1934 and 1936 to 1943, and General Secretary of the Australian Workers' Union from 1912 to 1941. The division was originally a solidly working-class area, although migration and gentrification have since radically changed its demography. Despite the demographic changes, it has been held by the Australian Labor Party for its entire existence; the Liberals have only once received 40 percent of the two-party vote. Grayndler also has a very high percentage of Australian Greens voters with 23 percent of the primary vote at the 2013 election. At the 2010 election, the two-party-preferred vote was between Labor and the Greens, one of only 3 in Australia (the others being Batman and the Greens held Melbourne).

Its most prominent members have been Fred Daly, who was a minister in the Whitlam government, Leo McLeay, who was Speaker of the House 1989–93, and Anthony Albanese, the present member for the seat. Albanese was a minister in the Rudd and Gillard governments, Deputy Prime Minister for three months in 2013, and is currently the leader of the Labor Party (since 2019) and Prime Minister of Australia (since 2022).

Daly was succeeded by Tony Whitlam at the 1975 election, the election that Whitlam's father and Labor Party leader Gough Whitlam had lost. The younger Whitlam served only one term before losing preselection to Frank Stewart, who transferred from the abolished neighbouring Division of Lang. Stewart died in office in 1979 and the seat was won by McLeay in the subsequent by-election.

When Transport Minister Graham Richardson was briefly forced out of cabinet due to the Marshall Islands affair before the 1993 election, Albanese, who was a left-wing power-broker in the party, arranged for fellow left-winger Jeannette McHugh to be promoted to the ministry. McHugh's seat of Phillip was due to be abolished in the election. Being a minister allowed her to be entitled to a seat, so she transferred to Grayndler. This forced McLeay to transfer from Grayndler to Watson. McHugh retired in 1996 and handed the seat to Albanese, who still holds it today.

In the 2025 election, Grayndler was one of only 11 electorates whose result was decided by first preference votes.

== Geography ==
At 34 square kilometres (13 sq mi), it is Australia's second-smallest electorate, located in the inner-southern Sydney metropolitan area, including parts of the inner-west. The electorate includes the suburbs of Ashfield, Ashbury, Burwood Heights, Croydon Park, Dulwich Hill, Enfield, Enmore, Haberfield, Hurlstone Park, Leichhardt, Lewisham, Marrickville, Petersham, Summer Hill and Sydenham; as well as parts of Annandale, Camperdown, Canterbury, Croydon, Lilyfield, Newtown, St Peters, Stanmore and Tempe.

Since 1984, federal electoral division boundaries in Australia have been determined at redistributions by a redistribution committee appointed by the Australian Electoral Commission. Redistributions occur for the boundaries of divisions in a particular state, and they occur every seven years, or sooner if a state's representation entitlement changes or when divisions of a state are malapportioned.

== Members ==
Image	Member	Party	Term	Notes
	Fred Daly (1912–1995)	Labor	10 December 1949 – 11 November 1975	Previously held the Division of Martin. Served as minister under Whitlam. Retired
	Tony Whitlam (1944–)	Labor	13 December 1975 – 10 December 1977	Lost preselection. Failed to win the Division of St George
	Frank Stewart (1923–1979)	Labor	10 December 1977 – 16 April 1979	Previously held the Division of Lang. Died in office
	Leo McLeay (1945–)	Labor	23 June 1979 – 13 March 1993	Served as Speaker during the Hawke and Keating Governments. Transferred to the Division of Watson
	Jeannette McHugh (1934–)	Labor	13 March 1993 – 29 January 1996	Previously held the Division of Phillip. Served as minister under Keating. Retired
	Anthony Albanese (1963–)	Labor	2 March 1996 – present	Served as minister under Rudd and Gillard. Served as Deputy Prime Minister under Rudd. Served as Opposition Leader from 2019 to 2022. Incumbent. Currently the Prime Minister of Australia

== Election results ==
2025 Australian federal election: Grayndler
Party	Candidate	Votes	%	±%
Labor	Anthony Albanese	59,364	53.54	+0.84
Greens	Hannah Thomas	27,847	25.11	+4.18
Liberal	David Smallbone	15,867	14.31	−3.54
One Nation	Rodney Smith	3,505	3.16	+0.87
Independent	David Bradbury	2,566	2.31	+2.31
Trumpet of Patriots	Cheri Burrell	1,729	1.56	+1.56
Total formal votes		110,878	95.88	+0.90
Informal votes		4,763	4.12	−0.90
Turnout		115,641	92.11	+2.59
Notional two-party-preferred count
Labor	Anthony Albanese	88,897	80.18	+3.55
Liberal	David Smallbone	21,981	19.82	−3.55
Two-candidate-preferred result
Labor	Anthony Albanese	74,138	66.86	+2.89
Greens	Hannah Thomas	36,740	33.14	−2.89
Labor hold		Swing	+2.89	
