= Division of Phillip =

Former Australian federal electoral division

Phillip Australian House of Representatives Division
- Created: 1949
- Abolished: 1993
- Namesake: Arthur Phillip

The Division of Phillip was an Australian Electoral Division in the state of New South Wales. It was located in the Sydney's eastern suburbs, and was named after Captain Arthur Phillip, captain of the First Fleet and first Governor of New South Wales. The Division included the suburbs of Bondi, Coogee, Kensington and Randwick.

The seat was proclaimed at the redistribution of 11 May 1949, and was first contested at the 1949 Federal election. It was abolished prior to the 1993 federal election. It was a marginal seat that from 1963 onward was held by the governing party of the day.

== Members ==
Image	Member	Party	Term	Notes
	Joe Fitzgerald (1912–1985)	Labor	10 December 1949 – 10 December 1955	Lost seat. Later elected to the Senate in 1961
	William Aston (1916–1997)	Liberal	10 December 1955 – 9 December 1961	Lost seat
	Syd Einfeld (1909–1995)	Labor	9 December 1961 – 30 November 1963	Lost seat. Later elected to the New South Wales Legislative Assembly seat of Bondi in 1965
	Sir William Aston (1916–1997)	Liberal	30 November 1963 – 2 December 1972	Served as Chief Government Whip in the House under Menzies and Holt. Served as Speaker during the Holt, McEwen, Gorton and McMahon Governments. Lost seat
	Joe Riordan (1930–2012)	Labor	2 December 1972 – 13 December 1975	Served as minister under Whitlam. Lost seat
	Jack Birney (1928–1995)	Liberal	13 December 1975 – 5 March 1983	Lost seat
	Jeannette McHugh (1934–)	Labor	5 March 1983 – 13 March 1993	Served as minister under Keating. Transferred to the Division of Grayndler after Phillip was abolished in 1993
