= Candidates of the 1972 Australian federal election =

This article provides information on candidates who stood for the 1972 Australian federal election. The election was held on 2 December 1972.

== Retiring Members ==
=== Labor ===
- Arthur Calwell MP (Melbourne, Vic)
- Allan Fraser MP (Eden-Monaro, NSW)
- Charles Griffiths MP (Shortland, NSW)
- Hector McIvor MP (Gellibrand, Vic)

=== Liberal ===
- Tom Hughes MP (Berowra, NSW)
- Sir Alan Hulme MP (Petrie, Qld)
- Sir Reginald Swartz MP (Darling Downs, Qld)

=== Country ===
- Sir Charles Adermann MP (Fisher, Qld)
- Charles Barnes MP (McPherson, Qld)
- Sir Winton Turnbull MP (Mallee, Vic)

== House of Representatives ==
Sitting members at the time of the election are shown in bold text. Successful candidates are highlighted in the relevant colour. Where there is possible confusion, an asterisk (*) is also used.

=== Australian Capital Territory ===
Electorate	Held by	Labor candidate	Liberal candidate	DLP candidate	Australia candidate	Independent candidate
Australian Capital Territory	Labor	**Kep Enderby**	Peter Hughes	Terence Christie	Alan Fitzgerald	Barry Blair; Arthur Burns; Pat Eatock; Harry Marsh; Michael Salvador

=== New South Wales ===
Electorate	Held by	Labor candidate	Coalition candidate	DLP candidate	Australia candidate	Other candidates
Banks	Labor	**Vince Martin**	Randall Green (Lib)	John Anderson	Charles Nasmyth	
Barton	Labor	**Len Reynolds**	Vince Bruce (Lib)	Bruce Stafford	Rhonda Howse	Brian Howard (Ind)
Bennelong	Liberal	Norman Russell	**Sir John Cramer** (Lib)	Gwen Fitzpatrick	Claudia Leach	Jean Sulima (DOGS)
Berowra	Liberal	George Williams	Harry Edwards (Lib)	Michael Strenger	David Haig	
Blaxland	Labor	**Paul Keating**	John Ghent (Lib)	Anthony Young		
Bradfield	Liberal	John Pomeroy	**Harry Turner** (Lib)	Allan Dwyer	Mavis McMillan	Helen Berrill (Ind)
Calare	Country	Francis Hall	**John England** (CP)	John Grant		
Chifley	Labor	**John Armitage**	Alan Calaby (Lib)	Francesco Rea		
Cook	Liberal	Ray Thorburn	**Don Dobie** (Lib)	Bernard Forshaw	Marjorie Gray	Ronald Gallagher (Ind); Judith Sainsbury (DOGS)
Cowper	Country	Thomas Cronin	**Ian Robinson** (CP)	David Cumming	John Maynes	
Cunningham	Labor	**Rex Connor**	John Poel (Lib)	Peter Daly	John Sladek	Reg Wilding (CPA)
Darling	Labor	**John FitzPatrick**	James Donohoe (Lib); Max Overton (CP)	John Darcy		
Eden-Monaro	Labor	Bob Whan	Roy Howard (CP); Doug Otton (Lib)	Anthony Abbey	Hugh Watson	
Evans	Liberal	Allan Mulder	**Malcolm Mackay** (Lib)	Gary Doherty	John Dease	Noel MacDonald (Ind)
Farrer	Liberal	Kevin Esler	**David Fairbairn** (Lib)	Anthony Quinn	Mike Donelan	
Grayndler	Labor	**Fred Daly**	Jonathan Fowler (Lib)	Anthony Kiely		
Gwydir	Country	Robert Downing	**Ralph Hunt** (CP)	John Gough	Kevin Mapperson	William O'Donnell (Ind)
Hughes	Labor	**Les Johnson**	Eric Blain (Lib)	William Goslett		
Hume	Country	Frank Olley	**Ian Pettitt** (CP)	John Hogan		
Hunter	Labor	**Bert James**	Stanley Gumbleton (Lib)			
Kingsford-Smith	Labor	**Lionel Bowen**	Ronald Scott (Lib)	Graham Bennett		
Lang	Labor	**Frank Stewart**	Stanley Duncan (Lib)	Robert Burke		
Lowe	Liberal	Bill Fisher	**William McMahon** (Lib)	Agnes Bannon	John Steele	Marc Aussie-Stone (Ind); John Morgan (Ind); Kathleen Taylor (DOGS); Sandor Torzsok (Ind); David Widdup (Ind)
Lyne	Country	Peter Carney	**Philip Lucock** (CP)	Jack Collins	Stephanie Thew	Joe Cordner (Ind)
Macarthur	Liberal	John Kerin	Max Dunbier (Lib)	Everardus Himmelreich		Dianne Allen (Ind); **Jeff Bate** (Ind); Stephen Quilkey (Ind)
Mackellar	Liberal	Evan Davies	**Bill Wentworth** (Lib)	Thomas Colman	Richard Jones	Norman Ward (Ind)
Macquarie	Labor	**Tony Luchetti**	Basil Genders (Lib); Frank Wolstenholme (CP)	Leslie Clarke		
Mitchell	Liberal	Alfred Ashley-Brown	**Les Irwin** (Lib)	David Sanson	Patricia Berzin	Ivor F (Ind); David McArthur (Ind)
New England	Country	Justin Rowe	**Ian Sinclair** (CP)	Edwin Taber	Brian Edwards	
Newcastle	Labor	**Charles Jones**	Malcolm Blackshaw (Lib)	Robert Godfrey		Harry Anderson (CPA)
North Sydney	Liberal	Brian Maguire	**Bill Graham** (Lib)	Michael Fitzpatrick	James Feros	Romualds Kemps (Ind)
Parramatta	Liberal	Michael Whelan	**Nigel Bowen** (Lib)	Doris Brauer	James Mulheron	Derek Barker (DOGS); Graham Courtney (Ind)
Paterson	Country	Noel Unicomb	**Frank O'Keefe** (CP)	Aubrey Barr	Alan Capp	
Phillip	Liberal	Joe Riordan	**Sir William Aston** (Lib)	Dennis Anderson	Virginia Walker	Thomas Conway (Ind); Colette Tucker (DOGS); Neville Yeomans (Ind)
Prospect	Labor	**Dick Klugman**	Stanislaus Kelly (Lib)	William Dunbar		
Reid	Labor	**Tom Uren**	William Pardy (Lib)	Joseph Sanders		
Richmond	Country	Frederick Braid	**Doug Anthony** (CP)		Lawrence Alderman	
Riverina	Labor	**Al Grassby**	Eric Kronborg (CP); Peter Long (Lib)	Patrick Barry		
Robertson	Labor	**Barry Cohen**	Malcolm Brooks (Lib)	Edmund Dearn		
St George	Labor	**Bill Morrison**	Len Bosman (Lib)	Doris Allison	Christopher Owens	Charles Bellchambers (Ind)
Shortland	Labor	Peter Morris	Paul Clarkson (Lib)	Hugh Ansell	Charles Hockings	Geoff Curthoys (CPA); Leo Gately (Ind); Lionel Lambkin (Ind)
Sydney	Labor	**Jim Cope**	Graham Robertson (Lib)		Allan Sorrensen	Laurie Aarons (CPA); Pat Clancy (SPA)
Warringah	Liberal	John Oakley	**Michael MacKellar** (Lib)	Peter Keogh	Bridget Gilling	Eric Riches (Ind)
Wentworth	Liberal	Percy Allan	**Les Bury** (Lib)	Dominique Droulers	Helen Arbib	
Werriwa	Labor	**Gough Whitlam**	Ron Dunbier (Lib)	Andrew Murphy		Maurice Sharp (Ind); Walter Turner (Ind)

=== Northern Territory ===
Electorate	Held by	Labor candidate	Country candidate	Australia candidate	Independent candidate
Northern Territory	Country	Ted Robertson	**Sam Calder**	Gordon Briscoe; Charles Moffatt	Alexander Allan-Stewart; William Walsh

=== Queensland ===
Electorate	Held by	Labor candidate	Coalition candidate	DLP candidate	Australia candidate	Other candidates
Bowman	Labor	**Len Keogh**	Kerry Chiconi (Lib)	Denis Cochran		
Brisbane	Labor	**Manfred Cross**	Jim Anderson (Lib); Glen Sheil (CP)	Andrew Aitken		Charlie Gifford (CPA)
Capricornia	Labor	**Doug Everingham**	Kevin Connor (CP); Brian Palmer (Lib)	Brian Besley		
Darling Downs	Liberal	James Thomas	Colin Brimblecombe (Lib); Tom McVeigh* (CP)	Eugene Connolly		Ronald Alford (Ind)
Dawson	Labor	**Rex Patterson**	Lionel Bevis (CP)	John Judge		
Fisher	Country	Hamish Linacre	Evan Adermann* (CP); John Plowman (Lib)	Robert Barron		
Griffith	Liberal	Eddie Foat	**Don Cameron** (Lib)	Cecil Birchley	Beth Smith	
Herbert	Liberal	Fabian Sweeney	**Robert Bonnett** (Lib)	Kiernan Dorney	Leonard Weber	
Kennedy	Country	Tony McGrady	**Bob Katter** (CP)	Paul Rutherford		
Leichhardt	Labor	**Bill Fulton**	Walter Schulz (CP)	Bernard Marsh	Patrick Kelly	
Lilley	Liberal	Frank Doyle	**Kevin Cairns** (Lib)	James Morrissey	David Proud	Ralph Williams (Ind)
Maranoa	Country	Timothy Walker	**James Corbett** (CP)	Harry Green		James Dwyer (Ind)
McPherson	Country	Tom Veivers	Howard Richter (CP); Eric Robinson* (Lib)	Victor Kearney	Robert Richardson	John Black (Ind); James Drabsch (Ind)
Moreton	Liberal	Joe McDonald	**James Killen** (Lib)	Andrew Jackson	Arthur Smith	
Oxley	Labor	**Bill Hayden**	Peter Williams (Lib)	Miroslav Jansky		
Petrie	Liberal	Denis Murphy	Marshall Cooke* (Lib); Gordon Olive (CP)	Frank Andrews	Alex Dewar	
Ryan	Liberal	John Conn	**Nigel Drury** (Lib)	Bert Vann	Robert Wensley	Alan Jones (Ind)
Wide Bay	Labor	**Brendan Hansen**	George Crawford (CP)	Alan Birchley		Les Leisemann (NSP)

=== South Australia ===
Electorate	Held by	Labor candidate	Liberal candidate	DLP candidate	Other candidates
Adelaide	Labor	**Chris Hurford**	Keith Ashdown	George Basisovs	Elliott Johnston (CPA)
Angas	Liberal	Adolf Thiel	**Geoffrey Giles**	Terence Critchley	John Petch (CP)
Barker	Liberal	John Cornwall	**Jim Forbes**	David Le Cornu	
Bonython	Labor	**Martin Nicholls**	Rudolph Masopust	Peter Meredith	Frank Lawrence (Ind)
Boothby	Liberal	Anne Levy	**John McLeay**	Ted Farrell	Richard Llewellyn (AP)
Grey	Labor	**Laurie Wallis**	Pat Rehn	David Gray	Derek Ball (AP)
Hawker	Labor	**Ralph Jacobi**	Phyllis Rogers	James Kiley	John Steele (Ind)
Hindmarsh	Labor	**Clyde Cameron**	Ivan Denchev	Paul Hubert	
Kingston	Labor	**Richard Gun**	Peter Tonkin	Mark Posa	
Port Adelaide	Labor	**Fred Birrell**	Ian Fotheringham	Leon Dalle-Nogare	James Mitchell (Ind)
Sturt	Labor	**Norm Foster**	Ian Wilson	Walter Doran	Peter Wilkinson (NSP)
Wakefield	Liberal	Terence de Lacy	**Bert Kelly**	John McMahon	James Shannon (CP)

=== Tasmania ===
Electorate	Held by	Labor candidate	Liberal candidate	DLP candidate	Other candidates
Bass	Labor	**Lance Barnard**	John Beswick	Jindrich Nermut	
Braddon	Labor	**Ron Davies**	William Luck	Dudley McNamara	
Denison	Liberal	John Coates	**Robert Solomon**	Michael Delaney	Brian Broadby (Ind); Bill Scetrine (AP)
Franklin	Labor	**Ray Sherry**	William Craig	Keith Kelly	
Wilmot	Labor	**Gil Duthie**	Ian Hardy	Ronald Butterworth	

=== Victoria ===
Electorate	Held by	Labor candidate	Coalition candidate	DLP candidate	Australia candidate	Other candidates
Balaclava	Liberal	Irene Dunsmuir	**Ray Whittorn** (Lib)	Ralph James		Leslie Rubinstein (Ind)
Ballaarat	Liberal	David Williams	**Dudley Erwin** (Lib)	Anthony Balkin		
Batman	Labor	**Horrie Garrick**	Leon Bram (Lib)	Henry Darroch		
Bendigo	Labor	**David Kennedy**	John Bourchier* (Lib); Joe Pearce (CP)	Paul Brennan		
Bruce	Liberal	Russell Oakley	**Billy Snedden** (Lib)	Rex Harper	Peter Moore	
Burke	Labor	**Keith Johnson**	Howard Thain (Lib)	Colin Walsh		
Casey	Liberal	Race Mathews	**Peter Howson** (Lib)	Kevin Adamson	Clive Champion	Alfred Andrews (DOGS); Margaret Briggs (Ind); Roderick Matthews (Ind)
Chisholm	Liberal	Alastair Nicholson	**Tony Staley** (Lib)	William Hoyne	Robert Cowley	
Corangamite	Liberal	Edwin Morris	**Tony Street** (Lib)	Francis O'Brien		
Corio	Labor	**Gordon Scholes**	John Pawson (Lib)	John Timberlake		
Deakin	Liberal	William French	**Alan Jarman** (Lib)	Maurice Weston	Gavan Burn	Harold Jeffrey (Ind)
Diamond Valley	Liberal	David McKenzie	**Neil Brown** (Lib)	Jim Marmion	John Siddons	Douglas Alexander (DOGS); Shaun Redmond (Ind)
Flinders	Liberal	Colin Bednall	**Phillip Lynch** (Lib)	John Glynn	David Heath	
Gellibrand	Labor	Ralph Willis	David Munro (Lib)	Robin Thomas		
Gippsland	Country	Peter Turner	**Peter Nixon** (CP)	John Condon	John Bowron	
Henty	Liberal	Joan Child	**Max Fox** (Lib)	Terence Farrell	Michael Hughes	
Higgins	Liberal	David Hardy	**John Gorton** (Lib)	Peter Grant	Jack Hammond	
Holt	Liberal	Max Oldmeadow	**Len Reid** (Lib)	Henri de Sachau	Brenda Elliott	Ian Black (DOGS)
Hotham	Liberal	Barry Johnston	**Don Chipp** (Lib)	Henry Beven		Ian Kenner (Ind); John Murray (Ind)
Indi	Country	John Hodgson	**Mac Holten** (CP)	Christopher Cody		Ronald Gray (Ind); Geoffrey Ryan (Ind)
Isaacs	Liberal	Gareth Clayton	**David Hamer** (Lib)	Frederick Skinner	Peter Harrie	
Kooyong	Liberal	Clive Lipshut	**Andrew Peacock** (Lib)	Francis Duffy	Pamela Thornley	Ian Channell (Ind)
La Trobe	Liberal	Tony Lamb	**John Jess** (Lib)	George Noone	Don Walters	Eileen Fowler (DOGS); Jeffrey Gill (Ind)
Lalor	Labor	**Jim Cairns**	Joseph Sheen (Lib)	John Bacon		Cass Young (NSP)
Mallee	Country	Ronald Davies	Peter Fisher (CP)	Stanley Croughnan		
Maribyrnong	Labor	**Moss Cass**	Rex Webb (Lib)	Paul McManus	Gary Scholes	Lance Hutchinson (DOGS); Katrina Young (NSP)
McMillan	Liberal	Frank Mountford	Barrie Armitage (Lib); Arthur Hewson* (CP)	Michael Houlihan		**Alex Buchanan** (Ind)
Melbourne	Labor	Ted Innes	Patricia Clark (Lib)	Anna Linard	Wendy Nicholson	Max Ogden (CPA); George Samargis (Ind); Shane Watson (Ind)
Melbourne Ports	Labor	**Frank Crean**	Paul Fenton (Lib)	John Johnston		
Murray	Country	John Riordan	Bill Hunter (Lib); **Bruce Lloyd*** (CP)	Patrick Payne		
Scullin	Labor	**Harry Jenkins**	Graeme McEwen (Lib)	Tom Andrews		
Wannon	Liberal	Ted Garth	**Malcolm Fraser** (Lib)	Adrian McInerney		Linden Cameron (Ind)
Wills	Labor	**Gordon Bryant**	John Gray (Lib)	John Flint		
Wimmera	Country	Brian Brooke	**Robert King*** (CP)	Robert Hawks		Ray Buckley (Ind)

=== Western Australia ===
Electorate	Held by	Labor candidate	Coalition candidate	DLP candidate	Other candidates
Canning	Country	Allan Scott	**John Hallett*** (CP); Ian Pratt (Lib)	Patrick Hickey	Brian Burns (Ind); Thomas Hartigan (AP)
Curtin	Liberal	Sue Neacy	**Victor Garland** (Lib)	Peter McGowan	Maurene Locke (AP)
Forrest	Labor	**Frank Kirwan**	Peter Drummond* (Lib); David Reid (CP)	John Fleeton	Russell Moffet (AP)
Fremantle	Labor	**Kim Beazley**	Erica Lawton (Lib)	Rosemary Taboni	Jack Marks (CPA)
Kalgoorlie	Labor	**Fred Collard**	Gerald Gloster (Lib)	Geoffrey Sands	
Moore	Country	Peter Walsh	John Hyde (Lib); **Don Maisey*** (CP)	Benjamin Ballantyne	
Perth	Labor	**Joe Berinson**	Derrick Tomlinson (Lib)	Dorothy Cranley	
Stirling	Labor	**Harry Webb**	Ian Viner (Lib)	Brian Peachey	
Swan	Labor	**Adrian Bennett**	Richard Cleaver (Lib)	David Milne	Archelaus Marshall (AP); David Smith (Ind)

== Senate ==
Sitting Senators are shown in bold text. Tickets that elected at least one Senator are highlighted in the relevant colour. Successful candidates are identified by an asterisk (*).

=== Queensland ===
A special election was held in Queensland to fill the casual vacancy caused by the resignation of Liberal Senator Dame Annabelle Rankin. Neville Bonner, also of the Liberal Party, had been appointed to the vacancy in the interim period.

Labor candidate	Coalition candidate	DLP candidate	Independent candidates
Fred Nicol	**Neville Bonner***	Geoffrey Maule	Jerry Zaphir; Col Bennett; Harold Asmith; William Kenney

== Summary by party ==
Beside each party is the number of seats contested by that party in the House of Representatives for each state, as well as an indication of whether the party contested the special Queensland Senate election.

Party	NSW	Vic	Qld		WA	SA	Tas	ACT	NT	Total	
Party	HR	HR	HR	S	HR	HR	HR	HR	HR	HR	S
Australian Labor Party	45	34	18	*	9	12	5	1	1	125	1
Liberal Party of Australia	37	30	13	*	9	12	5	1	-	107	1
Australian Country Party	12	7	11	-	3	2	-	-	1	36	-
Democratic Labor Party	42	34	18	*	9	12	5	1	-	121	1
Australia Party	27	15	8	-	4	2	1	1	2	60	-
Defence of Government Schools	5	4	-	-	-	-	-	-	-	9	-
Communist Party of Australia	4	1	1	-	1	1	-	-	-	8	-
National Socialist Party of Australia	-	2	1	-	-	1	-	-	-	4	-
Socialist Party of Australia	1	-	-	-	-	-	-	-	-	1	-
Independent and other	26	16	6	-	2	3	1	5	3	62	-

== See also ==
- 1972 Australian federal election
- Members of the Australian House of Representatives, 1969–1972
- Members of the Australian House of Representatives, 1972–1974
- List of political parties in Australia
