= Electoral results for the Division of Mitchell =

Australian division election results

This is a list of electoral results for the Division of Mitchell in Australian federal elections from the division's creation in 1949 until the present.

== Members ==
Member	Party	Term
Roy Wheeler	Liberal	1949–1961
John Armitage	Labor	1961–1963
Les Irwin	Liberal	1963–1972
Alfred Ashley-Brown	Labor	1972–1974
Alan Cadman	Liberal	1974–2007
Alex Hawke	Liberal	2007–present

== Election results ==
=== Elections in the 2020s ===
==== 2025 ====
2025 Australian federal election: Mitchell
Party	Candidate	Votes	%	±%
Greens	Ben Speechly			
Liberal	Alex Hawke			
One Nation	Brendan McCreanor			
Labor	Dilvan Bircan			
Trumpet of Patriots	Mark Crocker			
Total formal votes				
Informal votes				
Turnout				

==== 2022 ====
2022 Australian federal election: Mitchell
Party	Candidate	Votes	%	±%
Liberal	Alex Hawke	56,918	52.61	−9.44
Labor	Immanuel Selvaraj	27,597	25.51	+1.57
Greens	Matt Cox	12,796	11.83	+3.76
United Australia	Linda Daniel	3,916	3.62	+0.88
Liberal Democrats	Clinton Mead	3,708	3.43	+3.43
One Nation	Donald McKenzie	3,258	3.01	+3.01
Total formal votes		108,193	95.74	+0.78
Informal votes		4,811	4.26	−0.78
Turnout		113,004	93.11	−1.02
Two-party-preferred result
Liberal	Alex Hawke	65,662	60.69	−7.94
Labor	Immanuel Selvaraj	42,531	39.31	+7.94
Liberal hold		Swing	−7.94	

Alluvial diagram for preference flows in the seat of Mitchell in the 2022 federal election. The winning candidate got over 50% of first preference votes, so this alluvial diagram is indicative only, and preference flows were not used to determine the final result. The preference flows were used to determine the two-candidate-preferred.

=== Elections in the 2010s ===
==== 2019 ====
2019 Australian federal election: Mitchell
Party	Candidate	Votes	%	±%
Liberal	Alex Hawke	61,202	62.05	+1.56
Labor	Immanuel Selvaraj	23,618	23.94	−0.67
Greens	Lawrence Murphy	7,955	8.07	+0.08
Christian Democrats	Craig L Hall	3,156	3.20	−3.71
United Australia	Roy Hoppenbrouwer	2,705	2.74	+2.74
Total formal votes		98,636	94.96	−0.53
Informal votes		5,234	5.04	+0.53
Turnout		103,870	94.13	+0.87
Two-party-preferred result
Liberal	Alex Hawke	67,698	68.63	+0.81
Labor	Immanuel Selvaraj	30,938	31.37	−0.81
Liberal hold		Swing	+0.81	

==== 2016 ====
2016 Australian federal election: Mitchell
Party	Candidate	Votes	%	±%
Liberal	Alex Hawke	55,168	60.49	−4.33
Labor	Andrew Punch	22,440	24.61	+3.53
Greens	Michael Bellstedt	7,287	7.99	+1.58
Christian Democrats	Darryl Allen	6,303	6.91	+3.70
Total formal votes		91,198	95.49	+1.90
Informal votes		4,308	4.51	−1.90
Turnout		95,506	93.26	−1.50
Two-party-preferred result
Liberal	Alex Hawke	61,847	67.82	−3.57
Labor	Andrew Punch	29,351	32.18	+3.57
Liberal hold		Swing	−3.57	

==== 2013 ====
2013 Australian federal election: Mitchell
Party	Candidate	Votes	%	±%
Liberal	Alex Hawke	56,706	65.47	+2.81
Labor	Andrew Punch	17,775	20.52	−5.81
Greens	Michael Bellstedt	5,554	6.41	−1.19
Christian Democrats	Darryl Allen	2,794	3.23	−0.18
Palmer United	Murray Schultz	2,792	3.22	+3.22
Democratic Labour	Nathan Dodd	987	1.14	+1.14
Total formal votes		86,608	93.69	−0.73
Informal votes		5,833	6.31	+0.73
Turnout		92,441	94.65	−0.12
Two-party-preferred result
Liberal	Alex Hawke	62,425	72.08	+4.92
Labor	Andrew Punch	24,183	27.92	−4.92
Liberal hold		Swing	+4.92	

==== 2010 ====
2010 Australian federal election: Mitchell
Party	Candidate	Votes	%	±%
Liberal	Alex Hawke	52,465	62.66	+7.87
Labor	Nigel Gould	22,046	26.33	−6.71
Greens	Colin Dawson	6,363	7.60	+2.32
Christian Democrats	Brendon Prentice	2,855	3.41	+0.82
Total formal votes		83,729	94.42	−1.51
Informal votes		4,952	5.58	+1.51
Turnout		88,681	94.76	−0.21
Two-party-preferred result
Liberal	Alex Hawke	56,229	67.16	+7.51
Labor	Nigel Gould	27,500	32.84	−7.51
Liberal hold		Swing	+7.51	

=== Elections in the 2000s ===
==== 2007 ====
2007 Australian federal election: Mitchell
Party	Candidate	Votes	%	±%
Liberal	Alex Hawke	46,115	56.74	−7.64
Labor	Nigel Gould	25,211	31.02	+10.02
Greens	Toni Wright-Turner	4,302	5.29	−0.64
Christian Democrats	Darryl Allen	2,099	2.58	+0.07
Climate Change	James Fiander	1,715	2.11	+2.11
Family First	Jarrod Graetz	1,022	1.26	−0.11
Independent	Jordie Stuart Bodlay	815	1.00	+0.45
Total formal votes		81,279	96.12	+2.73
Informal votes		3,278	3.88	−2.73
Turnout		84,557	95.63	+1.95
Two-party-preferred result
Liberal	Alex Hawke	50,058	61.59	−9.09
Labor	Nigel Gould	31,221	38.41	+9.09
Liberal hold		Swing	−9.09	

==== 2004 ====
2004 Australian federal election: Mitchell
Party	Candidate	Votes	%	±%
Liberal	Alan Cadman	54,582	64.35	+1.09
Labor	Harmohan Walia	17,673	20.84	−0.65
Greens	Sheryl Jarecki	5,258	6.20	+3.07
Christian Democrats	Michael Horgan	2,161	2.55	+0.42
Democrats	Kamran Keshavarz Talebi	1,440	1.70	−3.07
Family First	Joy Montgomery	1,140	1.34	+1.34
Independent	Stephen Burke	1,048	1.24	+0.34
One Nation	Norman Byleveld	1,037	1.22	−1.54
Independent	Jordie Stuart Bodlay	476	0.56	+0.56
Total formal votes		84,815	93.40	−2.10
Informal votes		5,991	6.60	+2.10
Turnout		90,806	95.10	−0.41
Two-party-preferred result
Liberal	Alan Cadman	59,950	70.68	−0.64
Labor	Harmohan Walia	24,865	29.32	+0.64
Liberal hold		Swing	−0.64	

==== 2001 ====
2001 Australian federal election: Mitchell
Party	Candidate	Votes	%	±%
Liberal	Alan Cadman	49,995	63.26	+3.35
Labor	John McShane	16,987	21.49	−0.47
Democrats	David Baggs	3,769	4.77	−0.26
Greens	Cindy Taylor	2,470	3.13	+0.87
One Nation	Dale Eder	2,183	2.76	−3.58
Christian Democrats	Ken Gregory	1,681	2.13	+0.53
Against Further Immigration	David Mudgee	1,235	1.56	+1.56
Independent	Stephen Burke	712	0.90	+0.90
Total formal votes		79,032	95.50	−1.05
Informal votes		3,725	4.50	+1.05
Turnout		82,757	95.81	
Two-party-preferred result
Liberal	Alan Cadman	56,366	71.32	+1.85
Labor	John McShane	22,666	28.68	−1.85
Liberal hold		Swing	+1.85	

=== Elections in the 1990s ===
==== 1998 ====
1998 Australian federal election: Mitchell
Party	Candidate	Votes	%	±%
Liberal	Alan Cadman	46,203	60.40	−7.03
Labor	Anthony Ellard	16,263	21.26	+2.10
One Nation	Stephen Burke	5,090	6.65	+6.65
Democrats	Helen McAuliffe	3,852	5.04	−3.20
Unity	Ilo Uzunoski	1,988	2.60	+2.60
Greens	Cindy Taylor	1,719	2.25	+2.25
Christian Democrats	Ken Gregory	1,235	1.61	+1.61
Natural Law	Michael Lyons	145	0.19	−0.28
Total formal votes		76,495	96.65	−0.36
Informal votes		2,648	3.35	+0.36
Turnout		79,143	95.62	−1.50
Two-party-preferred result
Liberal	Alan Cadman	53,432	69.85	−4.47
Labor	Anthony Ellard	23,063	30.15	+4.47
Liberal hold		Swing	−4.47	

==== 1996 ====
1996 Australian federal election: Mitchell
Party	Candidate	Votes	%	±%
Liberal	Alan Cadman	48,541	67.43	+2.54
Labor	Erica Lewis	13,790	19.16	−9.03
Democrats	Colleen Krason	5,930	8.24	+2.81
Against Further Immigration	Tony Pettitt	2,688	3.73	+3.73
Reclaim Australia	John Hutchinson	699	0.97	+0.97
Natural Law	Penny Price	338	0.47	+0.47
Total formal votes		71,986	97.02	−0.67
Informal votes		2,214	2.98	+0.67
Turnout		74,200	97.13	+0.29
Two-party-preferred result
Liberal	Alan Cadman	53,293	74.32	+5.66
Labor	Erica Lewis	18,410	25.68	−5.66
Liberal hold		Swing	+5.66	

==== 1993 ====
1993 Australian federal election: Mitchell
Party	Candidate	Votes	%	±%
Liberal	Alan Cadman	43,819	64.89	+1.98
Labor	Julie Kanaghines	19,036	28.19	+5.97
Democrats	Roger Posgate	3,664	5.43	−6.58
Confederate Action	Charles Anderson	1,005	1.49	+1.49
Total formal votes		67,524	97.68	−0.33
Informal votes		1,602	2.32	+0.33
Turnout		69,126	96.84	
Two-party-preferred result
Liberal	Alan Cadman	46,347	68.67	−1.36
Labor	Julie Kanaghines	21,149	31.33	+1.36
Liberal hold		Swing	−1.36	

==== 1990 ====
1990 Australian federal election: Mitchell
Party	Candidate	Votes	%	±%
Liberal	Alan Cadman	45,050	62.9	−9.6
Labor	Graeme McIlveen	15,704	21.9	−5.5
Democrats	Jan Watts	8,982	12.5	+12.5
Call to Australia	Harold Morton	1,854	2.6	+2.6
Total formal votes		71,590	98.0	
Informal votes		1,427	2.0	
Turnout		73,017	96.0	
Two-party-preferred result
Liberal	Alan Cadman	50,223	70.3	−2.2
Labor	Graeme McIlveen	21,172	29.7	+2.2
Liberal hold		Swing	−2.2	

=== Elections in the 1980s ===
==== 1987 ====
1987 Australian federal election: Mitchell
Party	Candidate	Votes	%	±%
Liberal	Alan Cadman	46,473	72.5	+5.0
Labor	Geoff Robinson	17,603	27.5	+2.0
Total formal votes		64,076	97.3	
Informal votes		1,769	2.7	
Turnout		65,845	95.1	
Liberal hold		Swing	+1.7	

==== 1984 ====
1984 Australian federal election: Mitchell
Party	Candidate	Votes	%	±%
Liberal	Alan Cadman	37,568	67.5	+0.8
Labor	Edward Mason	14,188	25.5	−2.5
Democrats	Alan Page	3,928	7.1	+1.8
Total formal votes		55,684	95.8	
Informal votes		2,427	4.2	
Turnout		58,111	94.9	
Two-party-preferred result
Liberal	Alan Cadman	39,411	70.8	+2.0
Labor	Edward Mason	16,273	29.2	−2.0
Liberal hold		Swing	+2.0	

==== 1983 ====
1983 Australian federal election: Mitchell
Party	Candidate	Votes	%	±%
Liberal	Alan Cadman	48,797	58.4	−4.8
Labor	Arthur Llewellyn	30,298	36.3	+5.6
Democrats	Rona Samuels	4,450	5.3	−0.8
Total formal votes		83,545	98.1	
Informal votes		1,623	1.9	
Turnout		85,168	95.1	
Two-party-preferred result
Liberal	Alan Cadman		60.5	−5.1
Labor	Arthur Llewellyn		39.5	+5.1
Liberal hold		Swing	−5.1	

==== 1980 ====
1980 Australian federal election: Mitchell
Party	Candidate	Votes	%	±%
Liberal	Alan Cadman	48,860	63.2	+2.8
Labor	Patrick McArdle	23,703	30.7	+3.6
Democrats	Rosemary Mason	4,744	6.1	−3.1
Total formal votes		77,307	98.0	
Informal votes		1,603	2.0	
Turnout		78,910	94.6	
Two-party-preferred result
Liberal	Alan Cadman		65.6	−1.6
Labor	Patrick McArdle		34.4	+1.6
Liberal hold		Swing	−1.6	

=== Elections in the 1970s ===
==== 1977 ====
1977 Australian federal election: Mitchell
Party	Candidate	Votes	%	±%
Liberal	Alan Cadman	39,454	60.4	−5.8
Labor	Ellen Thompson	17,733	27.1	−4.0
Democrats	Michael Hartnell	5,988	9.2	+9.2
Independent	Ronald Allan	1,817	2.8	+2.8
Progress	Dimitar Mikusalev	353	0.5	−0.7
Total formal votes		65,345	98.0	
Informal votes		1,331	2.0	
Turnout		66,676	95.5	
Two-party-preferred result
Liberal	Alan Cadman		67.2	−1.0
Labor	Ellen Thompson		32.8	+1.0
Liberal hold		Swing	−1.0	

==== 1975 ====
1975 Australian federal election: Mitchell
Party	Candidate	Votes	%	±%
Liberal	Alan Cadman	50,875	62.0	+12.0
Labor	David Savage	28,970	35.3	−11.6
Workers	Duncan Yuille	999	1.2	+1.2
Australia	Alexander Munro	705	0.9	−1.6
Independent	Dimitar Mikusalev	246	0.3	+0.3
Independent	Ivor F	225	0.3	+0.3
Total formal votes		82,020	98.1	
Informal votes		1,563	1.9	
Turnout		83,583	95.7	
Two-party-preferred result
Liberal	Alan Cadman		64.0	+12.5
Labor	David Savage		36.0	−12.5
Liberal hold		Swing	+12.5	

==== 1974 ====
1974 Australian federal election: Mitchell
Party	Candidate	Votes	%	±%
Liberal	Alan Cadman	39,009	50.4	+5.8
Labor	Alfred Ashley-Brown	36,283	46.9	−0.6
Australia	John Butterworth	2,080	2.7	−1.4
Total formal votes		77,372	98.6	
Informal votes		1,122	1.4	
Turnout		78,494	95.8	
Two-party-preferred result
Liberal	Alan Cadman		51.5	+2.7
Labor	Alfred Ashley-Brown		48.5	−2.7
Liberal gain from Labor		Swing	+2.7	

==== 1972 ====
1972 Australian federal election: Mitchell
Party	Candidate	Votes	%	±%
Labor	Alfred Ashley-Brown	31,631	47.5	+2.8
Liberal	Les Irwin	29,702	44.6	−3.1
Australia	Patricia Berzin	2,729	4.1	+1.8
Democratic Labor	David Sanson	1,925	2.9	−0.4
Independent	David McArthur	329	0.5	+0.5
Independent	Ivor F	226	0.3	+0.3
Total formal votes		66,542	97.6	
Informal votes		1,646	2.4	
Turnout		68,188	95.3	
Two-party-preferred result
Labor	Alfred Ashley-Brown	34,047	51.2	+3.7
Liberal	Les Irwin	32,495	48.8	−3.7
Labor gain from Liberal		Swing	+3.7	

=== Elections in the 1960s ===
==== 1969 ====
1969 Australian federal election: Mitchell
Party	Candidate	Votes	%	±%
Liberal	Les Irwin	25,560	47.7	−4.0
Labor	Alfred Ashley-Brown	23,907	44.7	+8.5
Democratic Labor	John Maguire	1,773	3.3	+0.1
Australia	Gordon Waller	1,244	2.3	+2.3
Pensioner Power	Harvey Clift	1,055	2.0	+2.0
Total formal votes		53,539	97.7	
Informal votes		1,275	2.3	
Turnout		54,814	95.0	
Two-party-preferred result
Liberal	Les Irwin	28,111	52.5	−6.7
Labor	Alfred Ashley-Brown	25,428	47.5	+6.7
Liberal hold		Swing	−6.7	

==== 1966 ====
1966 Australian federal election: Mitchell
Party	Candidate	Votes	%	±%
Liberal	Les Irwin	48,570	54.3	+5.0
Labor	Peter McLoughlin	30,070	33.6	−10.8
Independent	William Murray	3,528	3.9	+3.9
Independent	Francis Bonnor	2,885	3.2	+3.2
Democratic Labor	Andrew Diehm	2,878	3.2	−0.5
Independent	Alan Jones	433	0.5	+0.5
Independent	Michael Deecke	414	0.5	+0.5
Independent	Dennis Rees	373	0.4	+0.4
Independent	Kevin Martin	318	0.4	+0.4
Total formal votes		89,469	95.1	
Informal votes		4,614	4.9	
Turnout		94,083	94.3	
Two-party-preferred result
Liberal	Les Irwin		61.8	+8.7
Labor	Peter McLoughlin		38.1	−8.7
Liberal hold		Swing	+8.7	

==== 1963 ====
1963 Australian federal election: Mitchell
Party	Candidate	Votes	%	±%
Liberal	Les Irwin	29,230	49.3	+6.4
Labor	John Armitage	35,301	44.4	−7.8
Democratic Labor	Malcolm Towner	2,943	3.7	−0.6
New Guinea	Albert Ackerman	1,604	2.0	+2.0
Independent	John Ashe	438	0.6	+0.6
Total formal votes		79,516	97.6	
Informal votes		1,976	2.4	
Turnout		81,492	94.6	
Two-party-preferred result
Liberal	Les Irwin	42,226	53.1	+6.5
Labor	John Armitage	37,290	46.9	−6.5
Liberal gain from Labor		Swing	+6.5	

==== 1961 ====
1961 Australian federal election: Mitchell
Party	Candidate	Votes	%	±%
Labor	John Armitage	36,363	52.2	+11.0
Liberal	Roy Wheeler	29,887	42.9	−11.7
Democratic Labor	Allan Dwyer	3,011	4.3	+0.1
Independent	John Mantova	404	0.6	+0.6
Total formal votes		69,665	97.4	
Informal votes		1,854	2.6	
Turnout		71,519	94.9	
Two-party-preferred result
Labor	John Armitage		53.4	+11.4
Liberal	Roy Wheeler		46.6	−11.4
Labor gain from Liberal		Swing	+11.4	

=== Elections in the 1950s ===
==== 1958 ====
1958 Australian federal election: Mitchell
Party	Candidate	Votes	%	±%
Liberal	Roy Wheeler	26,536	54.6	−5.1
Labor	Reginald Byrne	20,062	41.2	+0.9
Democratic Labor	Francis Moffitt	2,039	4.2	+4.2
Total formal votes		48,637	97.4	
Informal votes		1,317	2.6	
Turnout		49,954	94.3	
Two-party-preferred result
Liberal	Roy Wheeler		58.0	−1.7
Labor	Reginald Byrne		42.0	+1.7
Liberal hold		Swing	−1.7	

==== 1955 ====
1955 Australian federal election: Mitchell
Party	Candidate	Votes	%	±%
Liberal	Roy Wheeler	24,077	59.7	+3.8
Labor	Doug Bowd	16,239	40.3	−3.8
Total formal votes		40,316	97.6	
Informal votes		971	2.4	
Turnout		41,287	93.8	
Liberal hold		Swing	+3.8	

==== 1954 ====
1954 Australian federal election: Mitchell
Party	Candidate	Votes	%	±%
Liberal	Roy Wheeler	24,391	50.1	−3.7
Labor	Doug Bowd	23,151	47.5	+6.4
Communist	Mel McCalman	1,186	2.4	−2.6
Total formal votes		48,728	98.7	
Informal votes		661	1.3	
Turnout		49,389	95.8	
Two-party-preferred result
Liberal	Roy Wheeler		50.3	−5.0
Labor	Doug Bowd		49.7	+5.0
Liberal hold		Swing	−5.0	

==== 1951 ====
1951 Australian federal election: Mitchell
Party	Candidate	Votes	%	±%
Liberal	Roy Wheeler	23,028	53.8	−3.1
Labor	Joseph White	17,580	41.1	−2.0
Communist	Mel McCalman	2,158	5.0	+5.0
Total formal votes		42,766	97.8	
Informal votes		978	2.2	
Turnout		43,744	95.7	
Two-party-preferred result
Liberal	Roy Wheeler		55.3	−1.6
Labor	Joseph White		44.7	+1.6
Liberal hold		Swing	−1.6	

=== Elections in the 1940s ===
==== 1949 ====
1949 Australian federal election: Mitchell
Party	Candidate	Votes	%	±%
Liberal	Roy Wheeler	23,274	56.9	+17.0
Labor	Joseph White	17,643	43.1	−8.7
Total formal votes		40,917	97.7	
Informal votes		963	2.3	
Turnout		41,880	96.4	
Liberal notional gain from Labor		Swing	+12.8	
