= Electoral results for the Division of Diamond Valley =

Electoral results, Diamond Valley

This is a list of electoral results for the Division of Diamond Valley in Australian federal elections from the electorate's creation in 1969 until its abolition in 1984.

== Members ==
Member	Party	Term
Neil Brown	Liberal	1969–1972
David McKenzie	Labor	1972–1975
Neil Brown	Liberal	1975–1983
Peter Staples	Labor	1983–1984

== Election results ==
=== Elections in the 1980s ===
==== 1983 ====
1983 Australian federal election: Diamond Valley
Party	Candidate	Votes	%	±%
Labor	Peter Staples	36,726	46.4	+6.0
Liberal	Neil Brown	36,006	45.5	−3.1
Democrats	Lynden Kenyon	5,162	6.5	−4.5
Democratic Labor	Anne-Marie Petrucco	1,229	1.6	+1.6
Total formal votes		79,123	98.1	
Informal votes		1,492	1.9	
Turnout		80,615	97.6	
Two-party-preferred result
Labor	Peter Staples	39,907	50.4	+4.1
Liberal	Neil Brown	39,216	49.6	−4.1
Labor gain from Liberal		Swing	+4.1	

==== 1980 ====
1980 Australian federal election: Diamond Valley
Party	Candidate	Votes	%	±%
Liberal	Neil Brown	35,082	48.6	+0.1
Labor	John Scomparin	29,186	40.4	+9.2
Democrats	Geoffrey Loftus-Hills	7,936	11.0	−5.2
Total formal votes		72,204	98.0	
Informal votes		1,438	2.0	
Turnout		73,642	96.3	
Two-party-preferred result
Liberal	Neil Brown	38,750	53.7	−6.6
Labor	John Scomparin	33,454	46.3	+6.6
Liberal hold		Swing	−6.6	

=== Elections in the 1970s ===
==== 1977 ====
1977 Australian federal election: Diamond Valley
Party	Candidate	Votes	%	±%
Liberal	Neil Brown	31,674	48.5	−7.7
Labor	Jean Downing	20,355	31.2	−6.9
Democrats	Ronald Goldman	10,561	16.2	+16.2
Democratic Labor	Christopher Curtis	2,672	4.1	+1.0
Total formal votes		65,262	98.2	
Informal votes		1,173	1.8	
Turnout		66,435	96.7	
Two-party-preferred result
Liberal	Neil Brown		60.3	+0.0
Labor	Jean Downing		39.7	-0.0
Liberal hold		Swing	+0.0	

==== 1975 ====
1975 Australian federal election: Diamond Valley
Party	Candidate	Votes	%	±%
Liberal	Neil Brown	47,975	55.0	+10.2
Labor	David McKenzie	34,252	39.3	−7.8
Democratic Labor	Christopher Curtis	2,691	3.1	−2.2
Australia	John Franceschini	1,308	1.5	−0.9
Independent	Marc Aussie-Stone	778	0.9	+0.9
Independent	John Duncan	198	0.2	+0.2
Total formal votes		87,202	98.6	
Informal votes		1,202	1.4	
Turnout		88,404	96.2	
Two-party-preferred result
Liberal	Neil Brown		59.1	+9.8
Labor	David McKenzie		40.9	−9.8
Liberal gain from Labor		Swing	+9.8	

==== 1974 ====
1974 Australian federal election: Diamond Valley
Party	Candidate	Votes	%	±%
Labor	David McKenzie	38,519	47.1	+1.9
Liberal	Geoffrey Waite	36,683	44.8	+5.8
Democratic Labor	Christopher Curtis	4,249	5.2	−1.9
Australia	Harold Taskis	1,987	2.4	−3.9
Independent	Victor Gibson	394	0.5	+0.5
Total formal votes		81,832	98.6	
Informal votes		1,172	1.4	
Turnout		83,004	95.7	
Two-party-preferred result
Labor	David McKenzie	41,495	50.7	−0.9
Liberal	Geoffrey Waite	40,337	49.3	+0.9
Labor hold		Swing	−0.9	

==== 1972 ====
1972 Australian federal election: Diamond Valley
Party	Candidate	Votes	%	±%
Labor	David McKenzie	30,927	45.2	+3.9
Liberal	Neil Brown	26,651	39.0	−6.7
Democratic Labor	Jim Marmion	4,876	7.1	−3.4
Australia	John Siddons	4,314	6.3	+3.8
Defence of Government Schools	Douglas Alexander	1,489	2.2	+2.2
Independent	Shaun Redmond	145	0.2	+0.2
Total formal votes		68,402	97.5	
Informal votes		1,761	2.5	
Turnout		70,163	96.7	
Two-party-preferred result
Labor	David McKenzie		51.6	+7.7
Liberal	Neil Brown		48.4	−7.7
Labor gain from Liberal		Swing	+7.7	

=== Elections in the 1960s ===
==== 1969 ====
1969 Australian federal election: Diamond Valley
Party	Candidate	Votes	%	±%
Liberal	Neil Brown	24,403	45.7	−2.2
Labor	David McKenzie	22,021	41.3	+8.0
Democratic Labor	Leo Morison	5,596	10.5	−1.2
Australia	John Hill	1,354	2.5	+2.5
Total formal votes		53,374	97.4	
Informal votes		1,443	2.6	
Turnout		54,817	96.3	
Two-party-preferred result
Liberal	Neil Brown	29,927	56.1	−6.0
Labor	David McKenzie	23,447	43.9	+6.0
Liberal notional hold		Swing	−6.0	
