= Electoral results for the Division of Jagajaga =

Australian division election results

This is a list of electoral results for the Division of Jagajaga in Australian federal elections from the division's creation in 1984 until the present.

== Members ==
Member	Party	Term
Peter Staples	Labor	1984–1996
Jenny Macklin	Labor	1996–2019
Kate Thwaites	Labor	2019–present

== Election results ==
=== Elections in the 2020s ===
==== 2025 ====
2025 Australian federal election: Jagajaga
Party	Candidate	Votes	%	±%
Independent	Abdi Mohamed			
Family First	Rae Rancie			
Liberal	Chris Parr			
Greens	Jy Sandford			
Independent	Chris Kearney			
One Nation	Leslie Ralph			
Labor	Kate Thwaites			
Total formal votes				
Informal votes				
Turnout				

==== 2022 ====
2022 Australian federal election: Jagajaga
Party	Candidate	Votes	%	±%
Labor	Kate Thwaites	41,412	40.90	+0.00
Liberal	Sahil Tomar	29,535	29.17	−10.04
Greens	Liz Chase	16,855	16.65	+2.26
Liberal Democrats	Maya Tesa	3,760	3.71	+3.71
United Australia	Allison Zelinka	3,493	3.45	−0.04
Independent	Zahra Mustaf	3,150	3.11	+3.11
One Nation	John Booker	2,274	2.25	+2.25
Federation	Brendan Palmarini	764	0.75	+0.75
Total formal votes		101,243	96.20	−0.74
Informal votes		4,003	3.80	+0.74
Turnout		105,246	93.00	−2.26
Two-party-preferred result
Labor	Kate Thwaites	63,122	62.35	+6.46
Liberal	Sahil Tomar	38,121	37.65	−6.46
Labor hold		Swing	+6.46	

Alluvial diagram for preference flows in the seat of Jagajaga in the 2022 federal election. indicates at what stage the winning candidate had over 50% of the votes and was declared the winner.

=== Elections in the 2010s ===
==== 2019 ====
2019 Australian federal election: Jagajaga
Party	Candidate	Votes	%	±%
Labor	Kate Thwaites	41,086	42.02	+0.90
Liberal	Richard Welch	37,755	38.62	−1.47
Greens	Paul Kennedy	13,929	14.25	+0.82
United Australia	Maria Rigoni	3,652	3.74	+3.74
Rise Up Australia	Jeff Truscott	1,345	1.38	+1.38
Total formal votes		97,767	96.86	−0.07
Informal votes		3,169	3.14	+0.07
Turnout		100,936	93.85	+0.43
Two-party-preferred result
Labor	Kate Thwaites	55,304	56.57	+0.97
Liberal	Richard Welch	42,463	43.43	−0.97
Labor hold		Swing	+0.97	

==== 2016 ====
2016 Australian federal election: Jagajaga
Party	Candidate	Votes	%	±%
Liberal	David Mulholland	37,920	41.03	−0.91
Labor	Jenny Macklin	36,238	39.21	+1.21
Greens	Hugh McKinnon	13,696	14.82	+1.87
Family First	Jessica Ward	2,341	2.53	+0.90
Animal Justice	Nathan Schram	2,235	2.42	+2.42
Total formal votes		92,430	97.29	+1.02
Informal votes		2,572	2.71	−1.02
Turnout		95,002	92.12	−1.90
Two-party-preferred result
Labor	Jenny Macklin	50,536	54.67	+1.54
Liberal	David Mulholland	41,894	45.33	−1.54
Labor hold		Swing	+1.54	

==== 2013 ====
2013 Australian federal election: Jagajaga
Party	Candidate	Votes	%	±%
Liberal	Nick McGowan	38,422	41.94	+7.01
Labor	Jenny Macklin	34,813	38.00	−9.00
Greens	Chris Kearney	11,863	12.95	−1.92
Sex Party	Nicholas Wallis	2,565	2.80	+2.80
Palmer United	Kitten Snape	2,452	2.68	+2.68
Family First	Tahlia Eadie	1,490	1.63	−0.86
Total formal votes		91,605	96.27	+0.24
Informal votes		3,549	3.73	−0.24
Turnout		95,154	94.06	−0.26
Two-party-preferred result
Labor	Jenny Macklin	48,669	53.13	−8.02
Liberal	Nick McGowan	42,936	46.87	+8.02
Labor hold		Swing	−8.02	

==== 2010 ====
2010 Australian federal election: Jagajaga
Party	Candidate	Votes	%	±%
Labor	Jenny Macklin	40,682	47.34	−0.82
Liberal	Joh Bauch	29,745	34.61	−2.94
Greens	Chris Kearney	12,847	14.95	+4.70
Family First	Joe Sgarlata	2,109	2.45	+0.09
Secular	Peter Harris	560	0.65	+0.65
Total formal votes		85,943	96.03	−1.52
Informal votes		3,556	3.97	+1.52
Turnout		89,499	94.01	−1.71
Two-party-preferred result
Labor	Jenny Macklin	52,868	61.52	+2.54
Liberal	Joh Bauch	33,075	38.48	−2.54
Labor hold		Swing	+2.54	

=== Elections in the 2000s ===
==== 2007 ====
2007 Australian federal election: Jagajaga
Party	Candidate	Votes	%	±%
Labor	Jenny Macklin	42,154	48.16	+3.38
Liberal	Conrad D'Souza	32,870	37.55	−4.78
Greens	Lisa Hodgson	8,971	10.25	+1.94
Family First	Andrew Conlon	2,065	2.36	+0.07
Democrats	Jason Graham	979	1.12	−0.03
Citizens Electoral Council	Stephen Lele	496	0.56	+0.38
Total formal votes		87,535	97.55	+1.53
Informal votes		2,196	2.45	−1.53
Turnout		89,731	95.70	+0.21
Two-party-preferred result
Labor	Jenny Macklin	51,630	58.98	+4.58
Liberal	Conrad D'Souza	35,905	41.02	−4.58
Labor hold		Swing	+4.58	

==== 2004 ====
2004 Australian federal election: Jagajaga
Party	Candidate	Votes	%	±%
Labor	Jenny Macklin	38,303	44.78	−0.34
Liberal	Woody Inman	36,210	42.33	+1.86
Greens	Don Ardin	7,111	8.31	+1.74
Family First	Jennifer Barton	1,956	2.29	+2.29
Democrats	Cate Hayward	983	1.15	−5.53
Veterans	Barry Minster	527	0.62	+0.62
Pensioners	Gary Schorel-Hlavka	285	0.33	+0.33
Citizens Electoral Council	Stephen Lele	162	0.19	−0.16
Total formal votes		85,537	96.02	−0.34
Informal votes		3,549	3.98	+0.34
Turnout		89,086	95.49	−0.29
Two-party-preferred result
Labor	Jenny Macklin	46,531	54.40	−0.88
Liberal	Woody Inman	39,006	45.60	+0.88
Labor hold		Swing	−0.88	

==== 2001 ====
2001 Australian federal election: Jagajaga
Party	Candidate	Votes	%	±%
Labor	Jenny Macklin	37,027	45.61	−2.54
Liberal	Brett Jones	32,619	40.18	+0.81
Democrats	Peter Wigg	5,421	6.68	+0.81
Greens	Samantha Roberts	5,178	6.38	+3.11
Independent	Gary Schorel-Hlavka	673	0.83	+0.83
Citizens Electoral Council	Paul Gallagher	266	0.33	+0.33
Total formal votes		81,184	96.36	−1.06
Informal votes		3,070	3.64	+1.06
Turnout		84,254	95.93	
Two-party-preferred result
Labor	Jenny Macklin	45,170	55.64	−0.27
Liberal	Brett Jones	36,014	44.36	+0.27
Labor hold		Swing	−0.27	

=== Elections in the 1990s ===
==== 1998 ====
1998 Australian federal election: Jagajaga
Party	Candidate	Votes	%	±%
Labor	Jenny Macklin	38,842	48.15	+3.99
Liberal	Tony Raunic	31,760	39.37	−3.34
Democrats	John McPherson	4,732	5.87	−1.07
Greens	Robyn Roberts	2,633	3.26	−0.03
One Nation	Ray Mason	1,971	2.44	+2.44
Unity	Grant Walters	468	0.58	+0.58
Natural Law	Steve Griffith	265	0.33	+0.01
Total formal votes		80,671	97.42	−0.01
Informal votes		2,137	2.58	+0.01
Turnout		82,808	96.11	−0.78
Two-party-preferred result
Labor	Jenny Macklin	45,100	55.91	+3.20
Liberal	Tony Raunic	35,571	44.09	−3.20
Labor hold		Swing	+3.20	

==== 1996 ====
1996 Australian federal election: Jagajaga
Party	Candidate	Votes	%	±%
Labor	Jenny Macklin	34,977	44.16	−3.40
Liberal	Michelle Penson	33,823	42.71	−0.66
Democrats	Timothy Newhouse	5,496	6.94	+3.59
Greens	Susan Coleman	2,609	3.29	+3.29
Against Further Immigration	Paul Tobias	994	1.26	+0.24
Independent	Andrew Mackenzie	839	1.06	+1.06
Natural Law	Byron Rigby	249	0.31	−0.83
Independent	Chris Vassis	214	0.27	−0.75
Total formal votes		79,201	97.43	+0.36
Informal votes		2,089	2.57	−0.36
Turnout		81,290	96.89	+0.11
Two-party-preferred result
Labor	Jenny Macklin	41,550	52.71	−0.59
Liberal	Michelle Penson	37,280	47.29	+0.59
Labor hold		Swing	−0.59	

==== 1993 ====
1993 Australian federal election: Jagajaga
Party	Candidate	Votes	%	±%
Labor	Peter Staples	33,881	50.14	+9.75
Liberal	Alistair Urquhart	27,441	40.61	+0.21
Democrats	Bob West	2,137	3.16	−12.39
Independent	Chris Vassis	843	1.25	+1.25
Against Further Immigration	Angela Walker	842	1.25	+1.25
Natural Law	Sue Griffith	795	1.18	+1.18
Independent	Gary Foley	592	0.88	+0.88
Call to Australia	Doreen O'Kane	436	0.65	−1.86
	Eric Kirkwood	344	0.51	+0.51
Independent	Richard Fitzherbert	260	0.38	+0.38
Total formal votes		67,571	96.81	−0.22
Informal votes		2,225	3.19	+0.22
Turnout		69,796	96.78	
Two-party-preferred result
Labor	Peter Staples	37,430	55.46	+2.82
Liberal	Alistair Urquhart	30,064	44.54	−2.82
Labor hold		Swing	+2.82	

==== 1990 ====
1990 Australian federal election: Jagajaga
Party	Candidate	Votes	%	±%
Liberal	Fred Garrett	26,513	40.4	+3.3
Labor	Peter Staples	26,510	40.4	−10.9
Democrats	Howard McCallum	10,208	15.6	+6.9
Call to Australia	Colin Arnold	1,647	2.5	+2.5
Natural Law	Robert Morris	748	1.1	+1.1
Total formal votes		65,626	97.0	
Informal votes		2,009	3.0	
Turnout		67,635	95.9	
Two-party-preferred result
Labor	Peter Staples	34,484	52.6	−5.6
Liberal	Fred Garrett	31,029	47.4	+5.6
Labor hold		Swing	−5.6	

=== Elections in the 1980s ===
==== 1987 ====
1987 Australian federal election: Jagajaga
Party	Candidate	Votes	%	±%
Labor	Peter Staples	29,698	51.3	−1.7
Liberal	John Pasquarelli	21,479	37.1	−0.1
Democrats	Howard McCallum	5,023	8.7	+3.3
National	Laurie Kirwan	977	1.7	+1.7
Independent	Lynette Manning	757	1.3	+1.3
Total formal votes		57,934	94.7	
Informal votes		3,242	5.3	
Turnout		61,176	95.3	
Two-party-preferred result
Labor	Peter Staples	33,698	58.2	+2.1
Liberal	John Pasquarelli	24,191	41.8	−2.1
Labor hold		Swing	+2.1	

==== 1984 ====
1984 Australian federal election: Jagajaga
Party	Candidate	Votes	%	±%
Labor	Peter Staples	29,781	53.0	−2.6
Liberal	Frederick Garratt	20,905	37.2	+1.6
Democrats	Peter Lovell	3,038	5.4	+0.0
Democratic Labor	Len Moore	2,106	3.7	+1.9
Independent	Nino de Tress	357	0.6	+0.6
Total formal votes		56,187	91.9	
Informal votes		4,982	8.1	
Turnout		61,169	95.6	
Two-party-preferred result
Labor	Peter Staples	31,518	56.1	−2.3
Liberal	Frederick Garratt	24,644	43.9	+2.3
Labor notional hold		Swing	−2.3	
