= 1972 Australian federal election =

- 2 December 1972

All 125 seats of the House of Representatives 63 seats were needed for a majority
- Registered: 7,073,930 ▲7.08%
- Turnout: 6,747,244 (95.38%) (▲0.41 pp)
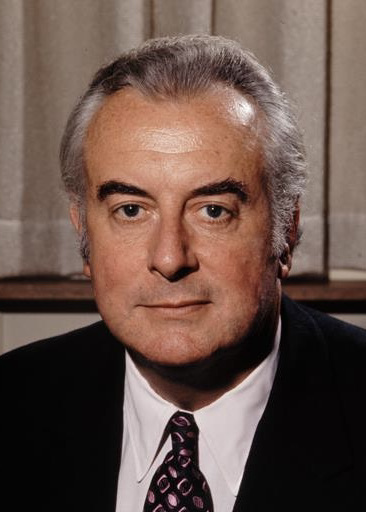

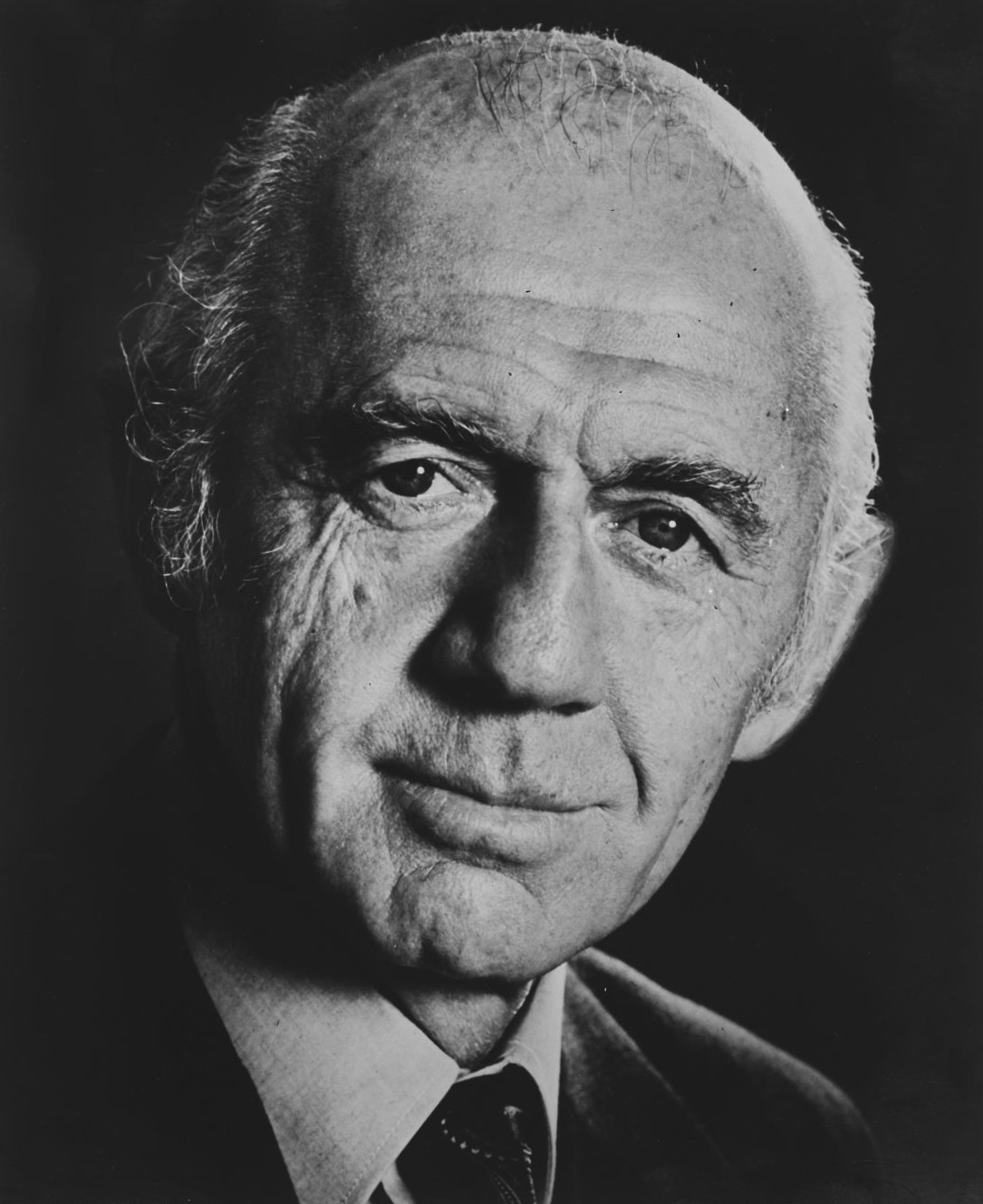
	First party	Second party
Leader	Gough Whitlam	William McMahon
Party	Labor	Liberal–Country Coalition
Leader since	8 February 1967	10 March 1971
Leader's seat	Werriwa (NSW)	Lowe (NSW)
Last election	59 seats	66 seats
Seats won	67	58
Seat change	▲8	▼8
Primary vote	3,273,549	2,737,911
Percentage	49.59%	41.48%
Swing	▲2.64	▼1.84
TPP	52.7%	47.3%
TPP swing	▲2.50	▼2.50
- Results by division for the House of Representatives, shaded by winning party's margin of victory.
Prime Minister before election
William McMahon
Liberal/Country coalition
Subsequent Prime Minister
Gough Whitlam
Labor

A federal election was held in Australia on 2 December 1972. All 125 seats in the House of Representatives were up for election, as well as a single Senate seat in Queensland. The incumbent Liberal–Country coalition government, led by Prime Minister William McMahon, was defeated by the opposition Labor Party led by Gough Whitlam. Labor's victory ended 23 years of successive Coalition governments that began in 1949 and started the three-year Whitlam Labor Government.

Whitlam became the first Labor leader since World War II to lead the party to victory from opposition. The feat was repeated by Bob Hawke in 1983, Kevin Rudd in 2007 and Anthony Albanese in 2022.

== Issues ==
The 1972 election campaign dealt with a combination of Vietnam and domestic policy issues, and the role of the federal government in resolving these issues. The Coalition of the Liberal and Country parties had been in government for 23 years. Successive Coalition governments promoted conservative economics, trade, and defence. However, Australian economic prosperity during the post-war period of the 1950s and 1960s led to the emergence of a range of "quality of life" issues regarding urban development, education, and healthcare. By 1972 these "quality of life" issues came to represent a major political problem for the coalition parties. Traditionally all of these areas had been handled by the state governments, and the Coalition had always asserted the importance of states rights, a view backed by Liberal state premiers like Robert Askin and Henry Bolte. Between 1966 and 1972, Labor leader Gough Whitlam developed policies designed to deal with the problems of urban and regional development using the financial powers granted to the federal government under the Australian Constitution. As Whitlam put it, Labor focused on "cities, schools and hospitals", and these issues were electorally appealing especially to the young and growing baby boomer generation living in the outer suburbs of the major cities.

By contrast, Coalition policies of conservative economic management, increasing trade, and Australian involvement in the Vietnam War disengaged a significant number of Australian voters. Australian involvement in the Vietnam War was initially popular. However, protests grew as the consequences of the war became apparent and the likelihood of a US-led victory diminished. A major part of the protests were directed at conscripting Australians to fight in the war. Liberal policies on Vietnam focused on the need to contain the spread of communism, but the gradual US and Australian troop withdrawal undermined this position. In 1971, Opposition Leader Gough Whitlam visited China. The Coalition heavily criticised the visit, but said criticism soon backfired and became an embarrassment when U.S. President Richard Nixon announced he would visit China the following year.

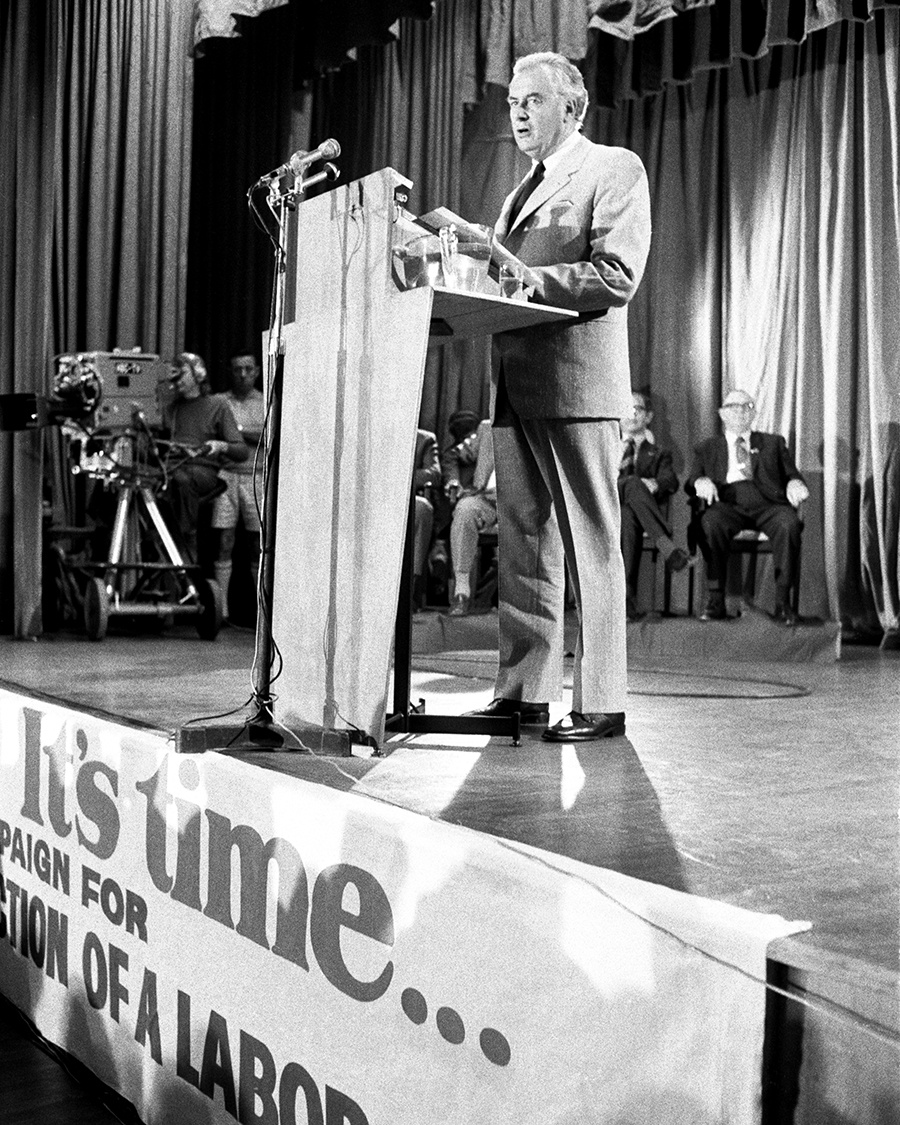
Whitlam giving Labor's policy speech at the Blacktown Civic Centre in Sydney

Finally, the incumbent Prime Minister William McMahon was no match for Whitlam, a witty and powerful orator. McMahon's position was precarious to begin with, for he had only emerged as Liberal Leader after a prolonged period of turmoil following the Coalition's unexpectedly poor showing at the 1970 half-Senate election and various state elections. In March 1971, Defence Minister Malcolm Fraser resigned from the ministry and declared that Prime Minister John Gorton was "unfit to hold the great office of Prime Minister". Gorton swiftly called for a vote of confidence in his leadership, which resulted in a 33-33 tie. Gorton could have continued with the result, but stated: "Well, that is not a vote of confidence, so the party will have to elect a new leader." McMahon won the ensuing leadership contest against Billy Snedden. This turmoil was only further compounded by Gorton immediately being elected as McMahon's deputy; he was ultimately sacked by McMahon for disloyalty in August 1971. These changes all made the Coalition appear weak and divided, and consumed in internal struggles.

McMahon was further weakened by concerns about inflation and negative press coverage. For example, Rupert Murdoch and his newspaper The Australian supported the ALP. The ALP ran a strong campaign under the famous slogan It's Time – a slogan which, coupled with its progressive policy programme, gave it great momentum within the electorate after 23 years of Conservative rule.

The Coalition government strongly opposed the opening of full diplomatic relationship with Beijing during Mao Zedong's regime.

== Results ==
=== House of Representatives ===
House of Reps (IRV) — 1972–74—Turnout 95.38% (CV) — Informal 2.17%
Party	Primary votes	%	Swing	Seats	Change
Labor	3,273,549	49.59	+2.64	67	+8
Liberal–Country Coalition	2,737,911	41.48	–1.84	58	–8
Liberal	2,115,085	32.04	–2.73	38	–8
Country	622,826	9.44	+0.88	20	0
Democratic Labor	346,415	5.25	–0.77	0	0
Australia	159,916	2.42	+1.54	0	0
Defence of Government Schools	9,703	0.15	+0.15	0	0
Communist	8,105	0.12	+0.04	0	0
National Socialist	1,161	0.02	+0.02	0	0
Socialist	1,062	0.02	+0.02	0	0
Independents	63,228	0.96	–1.57	0	0
Total	6,601,050			125	
Two-party-preferred (estimated)
Labor	Win	52.70	+2.50	67	+8
Liberal–Country coalition		47.30	−2.50	58	−8

Primary vote
Labor	49.59%
Liberal	32.04%
Country	9.44%
DLP	5.25%
Australia	2.42%
Other	1.27%

Two-party-preferred vote
Labor	52.70%
Coalition	47.30%

Parliament seats
Labor	53.60%
Coalition	46.40%

=== Senate ===
A special Senate election was held in Queensland to replace Liberal senator Annabelle Rankin, who resigned in 1971. Neville Bonner, who had been appointed to fill the casual vacancy by the Queensland Parliament, won the Senate position – the first Indigenous Australian elected to parliament. The election was held at the time of the House of Representatives election as per Section 15 of the Constitution.

Otherwise, no Senate election was held. An amendment to the constitution passed in 1977 ensured that senators appointed to fill casual vacancies now serve the entire term of the replaced senator; this meant that only half- or full Senate elections would occur from then onward.

== Seats changing hands ==
Seat	Pre-1972			Swing	Post-1972		
Seat	Party	Member	Margin	Swing	Margin	Member	Party
Bendigo, Vic	Labor	David Kennedy	3.0	3.2	0.2	John Bourchier	Liberal
Casey, Vic	Liberal	Peter Howson	5.0	7.2	2.2	Race Mathews	Labor
Cook, NSW	Liberal	Don Dobie	2.8	3.5	0.7	Ray Thorburn	Labor
Darling Downs, Qld	Liberal	Reginald Swartz	N/A	3.4	11.3	Tom McVeigh	Country
Denison, Tas	Liberal	Robert Solomon	2.6	7.2	4.6	John Coates	Labor
Diamond Valley, Vic	Liberal	Neil Brown	6.1	7.7	1.6	David McKenzie	Labor
Evans, NSW	Liberal	Malcolm Mackay	1.2	3.9	2.7	Allan Mulder	Labor
Forrest, WA	Labor	Frank Kirwan	1.1	4.7	3.6	Peter Drummond	Liberal
Holt, Vic	Liberal	Len Reid	3.5	7.9	4.4	Max Oldmeadow	Labor
Hume, NSW	Country	Ian Pettitt	1.0	2.9	1.9	Frank Olley	Labor
La Trobe, Vic	Liberal	John Jess	5.2	10.2	5.0	Tony Lamb	Labor
Lilley, Qld	Liberal	Kevin Cairns	1.7	1.7	0.0	Frank Doyle	Labor
Macarthur, NSW	Liberal	Jeff Bate†	3.8	6.0	2.2	John Kerin	Labor
McMillan, Vic	Liberal	Alex Buchanan†	N/A	2.9	2.4	Arthur Hewson	Country
McPherson, Qld	Country	Charles Barnes	N/A	6.5	4.7	Eric Robinson	Liberal
Mitchell, NSW	Liberal	Les Irwin	2.5	3.7	1.2	Alfred Ashley-Brown	Labor
Phillip, NSW	Liberal	William Aston	0.4	4.1	3.7	Joe Riordan	Labor
Stirling, WA	Labor	Harry Webb	5.5	8.4	2.9	Ian Viner	Liberal
Sturt, SA	Labor	Norm Foster	0.5	2.2	2.7	Ian Wilson	Liberal

- †Jeff Bate and Alex Buchanan contested their seats as independent candidates.

== Significance ==
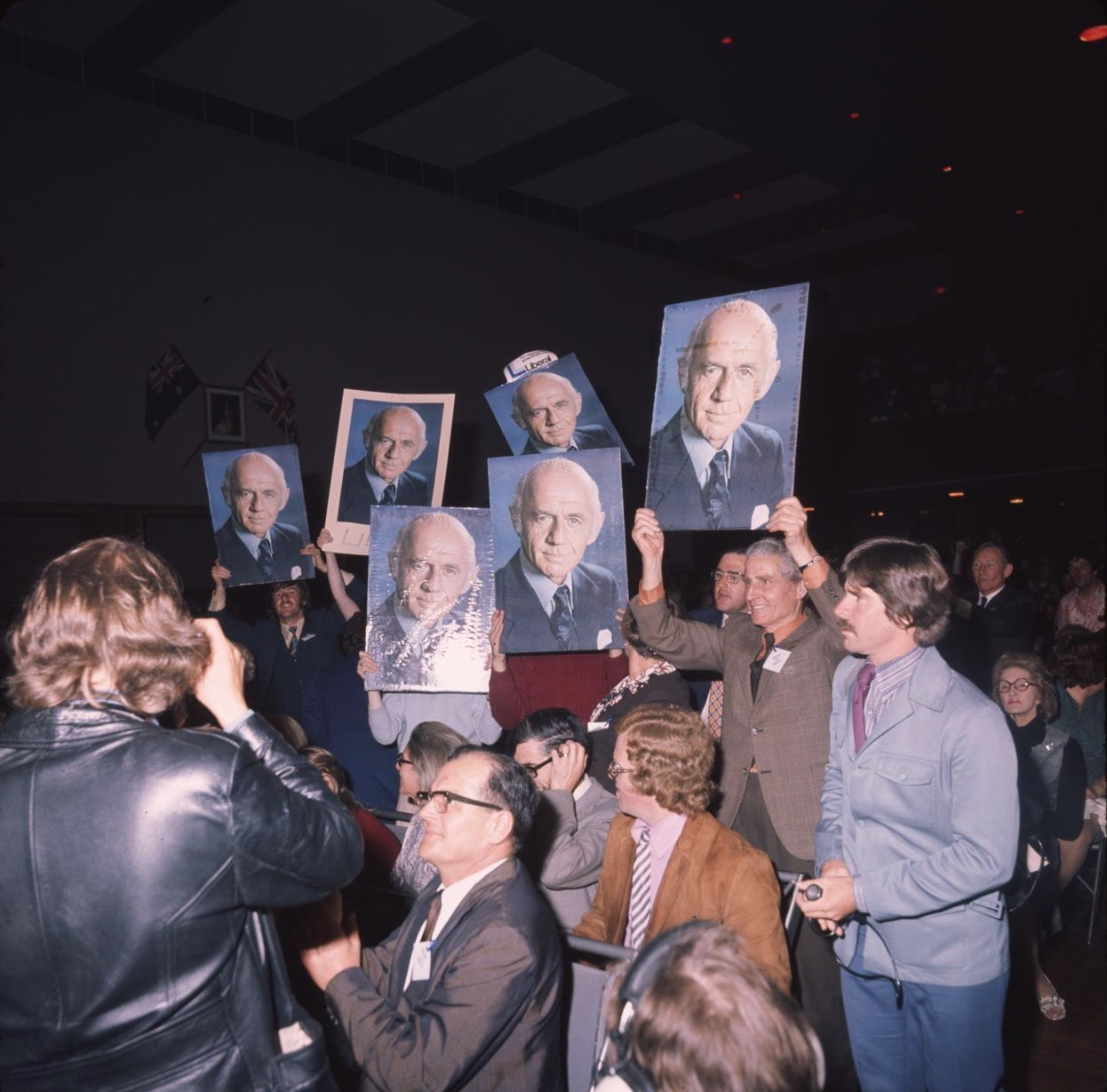
Supporters of McMahon hold up his placards at a rally during the election.

The 1972 election ended 23 years of Liberal–Country rule, the longest unbroken run in government in Australian history. It is also unusual in that Whitlam only scraped into office with a thin majority of four seats; historically, elections that produce a change of government in Australia have taken the form of landslides (as in the elections of 1949, 1975, 1983, 1996, 2007 or 2013, for example). The comparatively small size of Whitlam's win is partly explained by his strong performance at the previous election in 1969, where he achieved a 7.1% swing and gained 18 seats after Labor had been reduced to 41 of 124 seats and a 43.1% two-party vote in its landslide defeat in 1966.

Prime Minister Gough Whitlam quickly switched the diplomatic recognition from Republic of China (Taiwan) to People's Republic of China a few days before Christmas Day under the one-China policy. The new ruling Labor Party sought to ease the complicated tension between Australia and China.

The new Labor Government of Gough Whitlam was eager to make long-planned reforms, although it struggled against a lack of experience in its cabinet and the onset of the 1973 oil crisis and 1973–75 recession. In addition, the Senate was hostile to Whitlam. Between them, the Coalition and DLP held more seats than the ALP, as the term of the Senate at the time was 1971 to 1974. This in particular would make governing difficult, and led to the early double dissolution election of 1974.

== See also ==
- Candidates of the Australian federal election, 1972
- Members of the Australian House of Representatives, 1972-1974
