= Alan Cadman =

Australian politician (born 1937)

The Honourable Alan Cadman OAM
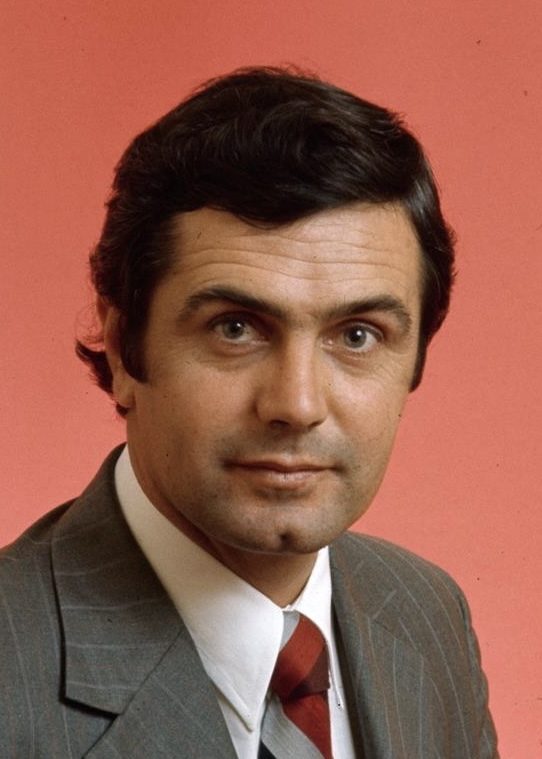
- Parliamentary portrait, 1974

Member of the Australian Parliament for Mitchell
- In office 18 May 1974 – 17 October 2007
- Preceded by: Alfred Ashley-Brown
- Succeeded by: Alex Hawke

Personal details
- Born: 26 July 1937 (age 89) Sydney, Australia
- Party: Liberal Party of Australia
- Education: University of New South Wales
- Occupation: Orchardist

Alan Glyndwr Cadman OAM (born 26 July 1937) is an Australian politician who served as a Liberal member of the Australian House of Representatives for over 30 years, from 1974 to 2007, representing the Division of Mitchell, New South Wales.

== Biography ==
Cadman was born in Sydney and studied agriculture at the University of New South Wales. He was an orchardist and company director before entering politics.

Despite his long tenure, Cadman was only considered for ministerial preferment twice. He served as parliamentary secretary to the prime minister (Malcolm Fraser) 1981–83 and parliamentary secretary to the minister for workplace relations and small business 1997–98. In 1992 he was one of a group of Coalition members of parliament who founded the Lyons Forum, a conservative ginger group.

In 2003 Cadman was featured in an episode titled Cadman for PM of the satirical news program, CNNNN. The episode ridiculed Cadman's tenure on the backbenches and compared it to Paul Keating's 6 months on the backbench in 1991 before successfully challenging Bob Hawke for the leadership of the Labor party.

Cadman was challenged for preselection ahead of the 2007 election by Alex Hawke. However, on 16 June 2007, Cadman withdrew from the preselection contest, and later announced his current term would be his last. He was to later condemn the circumstances under which he lost preselection to Hawke. Specifically, he accused Hawke of engaging in massive branch-stacking to ensure he would win the preselection contest for this comfortably safe Liberal seat.

Cadman formally retired on 17 October, when the House was dissolved ahead of the election. At the time of his retirement, he was tied with Prime Minister John Howard, the member for neighbouring Bennelong, as the second-longest serving member of the House of Representatives. Both Cadman and Howard had first been elected in 1974; only Philip Ruddock had served in the House longer than Cadman and Howard.

Psephologist Antony Green in noting that Cadman had entered Parliament at the same time as Howard said that Cadman's career had "not followed the stellar trajectory of John Howard".

Despite Howard and Cadman having entered Parliament at the same time, Cadman was only briefly a parliamentary secretary between 1997 and 1998 during Howard's prime ministership.

Just as Cadman and Howard had both entered Parliament in 1974 they both left it at the 2007 election. Alongside Cadman’s retirement, Howard, as the sitting prime minister, had lost his seat of Bennelong at the same time the Howard Government was voted out of office.

Parliament of Australia
Preceded by Alfred Ashley-Brown	Member for Mitchell; 1974–2007	Succeeded by Alex Hawke
