= Roy Wheeler (politician) =

Australian politician

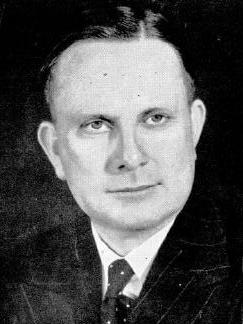

Member of the Australian Parliament for Mitchell
- In office 10 December 1949 – 9 December 1961
- Preceded by: New seat
- Succeeded by: John Armitage

Personal details
- Born: 4 February 1909 Gosford, New South Wales
- Died: 16 March 1971 (aged 62)
- Party: Liberal Party of Australia
- Occupation: Stockbroker

Roy Crawford Wheeler (4 February 1909 – 16 March 1971) was an Australian politician. Born in Gosford, New South Wales, he was educated at state schools before running a business in Gosford. He subsequently became a stockbroker in Sydney, and underwent military service from 1940–46. In 1949, he was elected to the Australian House of Representatives as a member of the Liberal Party, representing the new seat of Mitchell. He held the seat until his defeat in 1961. Wheeler died in 1971.

Parliament of Australia
| Division created | Member for Mitchell; 1949–1961 | Succeeded by John Armitage |
