= Claudia Leach =

Australian teacher and politician (1911–2009)

Claudia Leach MBE, born Gladwys Madge Scollick (15 March 1911 – 24 May 2009) was an Australian teacher and local politician.

She was born in Gunnedah to accountant Ernest Scollick and stenographer Maggie Campbell, and attended primary school at Willoughby and Chatswood in north Sydney. She then went to North Sydney Girls' High School and, from 1927, the University of Sydney, receiving a Bachelor of Arts and a Diploma of Education. She taught briefly at Cootamundra before lecturing at Armidale Teachers College from the age of nineteen. In 1939 she married Stephen Leach, whom she had first met, ignoring family objections to his Catholicism. She then taught at North Sydney and Cremorne Girls' high schools, and from 1953 trained as a school counsellor.

In 1959, she was elected to Lane Cove Council, and founded the "Pool of Service", soon renamed the Lane Cove Community Aid Service. This became a model for similar organisations internationally, and developed to include Meals on Wheels and a home companion service. Leach continued as an alderman for sixteen years and was thrice deputy mayor. She was appointed a Member of the Order of Australia in 1968, received a Local Government Association of New South Wales award in 1971, was named Woman of the Year by the North Shore Times in 1975, and in 1990 was awarded an honorary doctorate from the International University Foundation; in the latter year a scholarship at North Sydney Girls' High School was named in her honour. Leach died in 2009; her husband had predeceased her in 1967.
