= Peter Staples =

Australian politician

The Honourable Peter Staples

Minister for Aged, Family and Health Services
- In office 7 May 1990 – 24 March 1993
- Prime Minister: Bob Hawke; Paul Keating
- Preceded by: Himself (as Minister for Housing and Aged Care)
- Succeeded by: Position abolished
Member of Parliament 1983–1996
Member of the Australian Parliament for Diamond Valley
In office 5 March 1983 – 1 December 1984
Preceded by	Neil Brown
Succeeded by	Division abolished
Member of the Australian Parliament for Jagajaga
In office 1 December 1984 – 29 January 1996
Preceded by	New seat
Succeeded by	Jenny Macklin

Personal details
- Born: 15 October 1947 (age 78) Melbourne
- Party: Labor

Peter Staples (born 15 October 1947 in Melbourne, Victoria) is an Australian former politician for the Australian Labor Party. He was first elected to Parliament in 1983 as the Member for Diamond Valley, defeating Liberal incumbent Neil Brown. When Diamond Valley was abolished in 1984, Staples transferred to the newly created Jagajaga, essentially the more Labor-friendly western half of his old electorate. The eastern portion became Menzies and was taken by Brown.

In 1987, he was appointed Consumer Affairs Minister by Prime Minister Bob Hawke in his third ministry. Staples would remain a junior minister for nearly six years, serving as Minister for Housing and Aged Care and later Aged, Family and Health Services in the Hawke and Keating Ministries.

Staples lost his spot in the ministry to Frank Walker after the party's victory at the 1993 election. He spent the remainder of his career on the backbench until his retirement from politics in 1996, as stated in his documentary, The Dance of a Thousand Summers.

Political offices
Preceded by Lionel Bowen (Attorney-General)	Minister for Consumer Affairs; 1987–88	Succeeded by Nick Bolkus
Preceded by Peter Morris	Minister for Housing and Aged Care; 1988–90	Succeeded by Brian Howe
New title	Aged, Family and Health Services; 1990–93	Position abolished
Parliament of Australia
Preceded by Neil Brown	Member for Diamond Valley; 1983–84	Division abolished
New division	Member for Jagajaga; 1984–96	Succeeded by Jenny Macklin
