= Les Irwin =

Australian politician

Les Irwin CBE
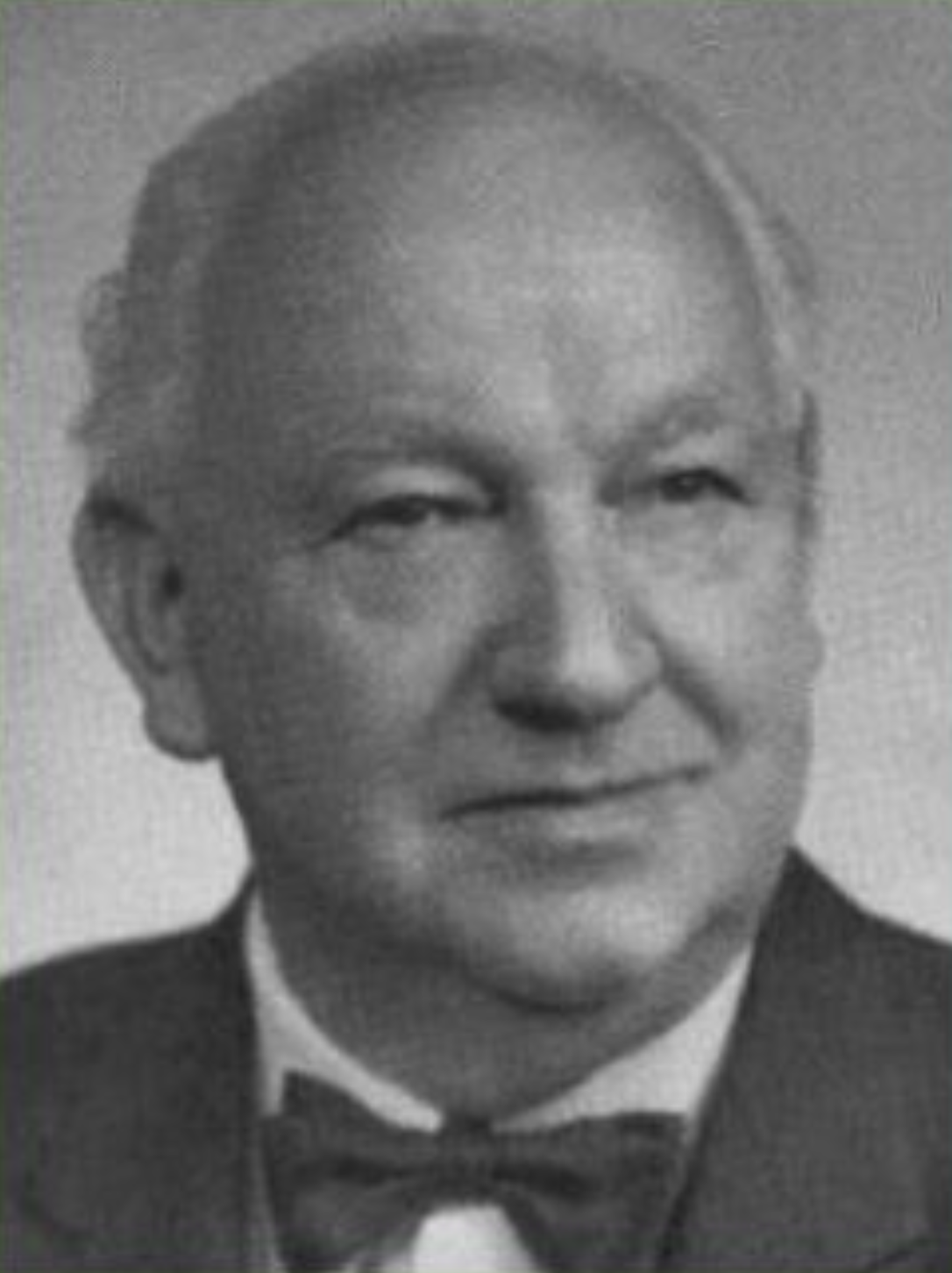

Member of the Australian Parliament for Mitchell
- In office 30 November 1963 – 2 December 1972
- Preceded by: John Armitage
- Succeeded by: Alfred Ashley-Brown

Personal details
- Born: 1 May 1898 Newcastle, New South Wales
- Died: 28 January 1985 (aged 86)
- Party: Liberal Party of Australia
- Occupation: Bank manager
- Awards: Commander of the Order of the British Empire

Military service
- Allegiance: Commonwealth of Australia
- Branch/service: Australian Army; Australian Flying Corps
- Years of service: 1916–1930
- Rank: Lieutenant
- Unit: 35th Battalion

Leslie Herbert Irwin, CBE (1 May 1898 – 28 January 1985) was an Australian politician. Born in Newcastle, New South Wales, he was educated at state schools and underwent military service 1916–30. Upon the end of his service, he became a bank manager. In 1963, he was selected as the Liberal candidate for the seat of Mitchell in the Australian House of Representatives. He was the last person born in the nineteenth century, the last person born before Federation, and the last World War I veteran elected to the House. He held Mitchell until his defeat in 1972. Irwin died in 1985.

Parliament of Australia
Preceded by John Armitage	Member for Mitchell; 1963–1972	Succeeded by Alfred Ashley-Brown
