= John Armitage (politician) =

Australian politician (1920–2009)

John Armitage OAM
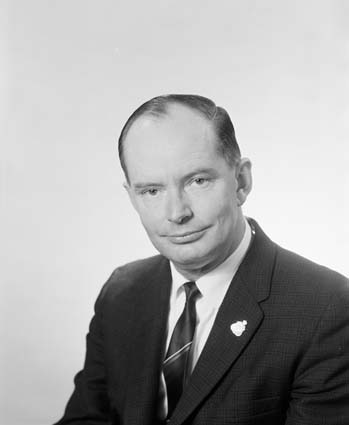

Member of the Australian Parliament for Chifley
- In office 25 October 1969 – 4 February 1983
- Preceded by: New seat
- Succeeded by: Russ Gorman

Member of the Australian Parliament for Mitchell
- In office 9 December 1961 – 30 November 1963
- Preceded by: Roy Wheeler
- Succeeded by: Les Irwin

Personal details
- Born: 11 November 1920 Sydney
- Died: 13 April 2009 (aged 88) Beecroft, New South Wales
- Party: Australian Labor Party
- Occupation: Bank officer

Military service
- Allegiance: Australia
- Branch/service: Australian Army
- Years of service: 1942–1945
- Rank: Gunner
- Unit: 35th Heavy Artillery Battery

John Lindsay Armitage OAM (11 November 1920 – 13 April 2009) was an Australian politician. Born in Sydney, he was educated at Sydney Technical High School before undergoing military service from 1942 to 1945. He became a bank officer with the Commonwealth and Reserve Banks before his election to the Australian House of Representatives in 1961, when he defeated Roy Wheeler for the seat of Mitchell, representing the Labor Party. He was defeated by Liberal Les Irwin in 1963, but in 1969 won the new seat of Chifley. He held the position until his retirement in 1983.

Parliament of Australia
Preceded by Roy Wheeler	Member for Mitchell; 1961–1963	Succeeded by Les Irwin
Preceded by new seat	Member for Chifley; 1969–1983	Succeeded by Russ Gorman
