= Division of Mitchell =

Australian federal electoral division

Coordinates: 33.710°S 150.960°E

Mitchell Australian House of Representatives Division
- Interactive map of electorate boundaries from the 2025 federal election
- Created: 1949
- MP: Alex Hawke
- Party: Liberal
- Namesake: Sir Thomas Mitchell
- Electors: 123,041 (2025)
- Area: 79 km^{2} (30.5 sq mi)
- Demographic: Outer metropolitan
Electorates around Mitchell:
Greenway	Berowra	Berowra
Greenway	Mitchell	Berowra
Parramatta	Parramatta	Parramatta

The Division of Mitchell is an Australian electoral division in the state of New South Wales. It is currently represented by Liberal MP Alex Hawke.

Mitchell is a largely white collar, upper class and socially conservative electorate in the Hills district of northwestern Sydney.

According to a 2022 survey by the ABC, Mitchell was the most conservative metropolitan electorate and the second-most conservative electorate in Australia after the Division of Maranoa.

== History ==
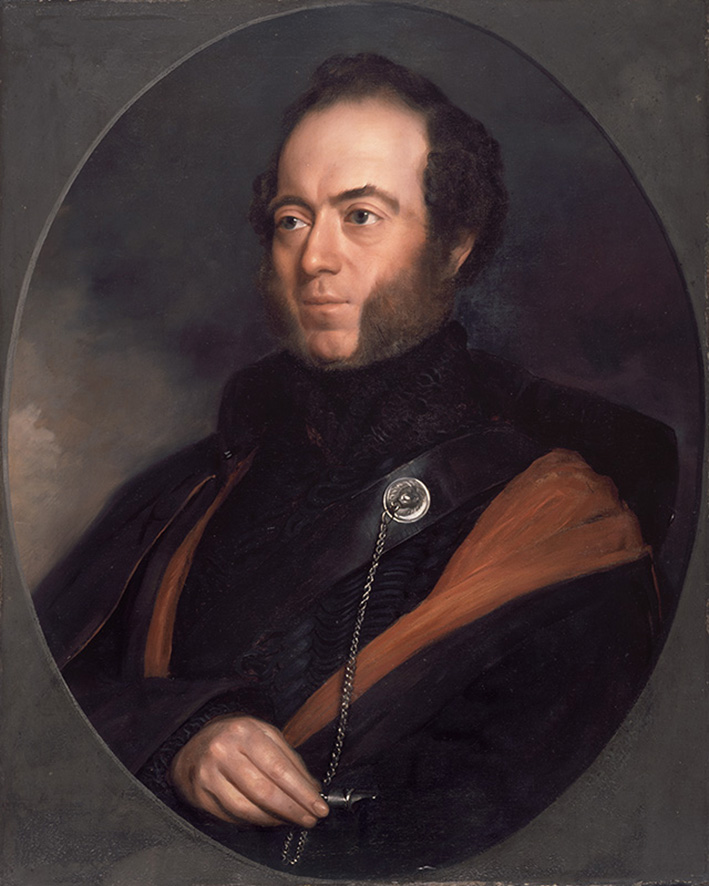
Sir Thomas Mitchell, the division's namesake

The division is named after Major Thomas Mitchell, surveyor and explorer who was the first European to explore large areas of New South Wales and Victoria. The division was proclaimed at the redistribution of 11 May 1949, and was first contested at the 1949 federal election. The majority of the electorate is fairly conservative, and it has been a safe seat for the Liberal Party of Australia for most of its existence. Labor has won it twice, for one term each. Labor last won it in 1972 in the swing that brought Gough Whitlam to power. However, proving this seat's conservative nature, the Liberals took it back in 1974 and have held it without serious difficulty since then. A 1984 redistribution cut out Richmond and the Hawkesbury River area, making this already safely conservative seat even more so. The current Member for Mitchell, since the 2007 federal election, is Liberal Alex Hawke.

The seat includes most of the Hills District, a region with a large evangelical Christian population that has pushed the seat further to the right. However, the southernmost suburbs of North Rocks, Northmead and Winston Hills are located in the Parramatta local government area, and share that LGA's bellwether tendencies. These areas have been won by Labor at high-tide elections such as at the 2007 federal election. After the 2013 federal election, Mitchell replaced nearby Bradfield as the safest Coalition seat in metropolitan Australia, with Labor needing a 22-point swing to win it. As of the 2019 federal election, it is the second-safest metropolitan Coalition seat, behind Cook, with an 18.6-point swing needed for Labor to win it.

== Geography ==
Since 1984, federal electoral division boundaries in Australia have been determined at redistributions by a redistribution committee appointed by the Australian Electoral Commission. Redistributions occur for the boundaries of divisions in a particular state, and they occur every seven years, or sooner if a state's representation entitlement changes or when divisions of a state are malapportioned.

When the division was first created in 1949, it covered the majority of north-western Sydney up to Wisemans Ferry, as well as part of Western Sydney including Penrith, Wetherill Park and Wentworthville. Most of these Sydney areas were previously in the Division of Robertson and Division of Macquarie respectively. The new division also covered areas further west in the Blue Mountains around the Bells Line of Road, up to the village of Mount Wilson. These Blue Mountains areas were also previously in the Division of Macquarie.

The division then lost many of its Western Sydney areas in 1968, mostly to form the new Division of Chifley, leaving Mitchell with only areas in north-western Sydney and Blue Mountains. In 1984, it was significantly shrunk in area, losing the Blue Mountains areas and additional areas in north-west Sydney, such as Windsor, Richmond and Riverstone, to the division of Macquarie and the newly-created division of Greenway. It then continued to lose further areas in successive redistributions until its current area as of 2024.

Since 2025, the division is located in the Hills District of Sydney, and includes the entire suburbs of Baulkham Hills, Beaumont Hills, Bella Vista, Norwest, Kellyville, North Kellyville and Winston Hills. The division also includes parts of Castle Hill, Glenhaven, North Rocks, Northmead, Old Toongabbie, Rouse Hill, and West Pennant Hills. As of 2025, the entire length of Old Windsor Road forms the western border of the division.

== Members ==
Image	Member	Party	Term	Notes
	Roy Wheeler (1909–1971)	Liberal	10 December 1949 – 9 December 1961	Lost seat
	John Armitage (1920–2009)	Labor	9 December 1961 – 30 November 1963	Lost seat. Later elected to the Division of Chifley in 1969
	Les Irwin (1898–1985)	Liberal	30 November 1963 – 2 December 1972	Lost seat. Last veteran of the First World War to serve in the House of Representatives
	Alfred Ashley-Brown (1907–1993)	Labor	2 December 1972 – 18 May 1974	Lost seat
	Alan Cadman (1937–)	Liberal	18 May 1974 – 17 October 2007	Served as Chief Government Whip in the House under Howard. Retired
	Alex Hawke (1977–)	Liberal	24 November 2007 – present	Served as minister under Morrison. Incumbent

== Election results ==
2025 Australian federal election: Mitchell
Party	Candidate	Votes	%	±%
Liberal	Alex Hawke	50,758	46.33	−6.07
Labor	Dilvan Bircan	36,396	33.22	+7.62
Greens	Ben Speechly	15,044	13.73	+1.75
One Nation	Brendan McCreanor	4,680	4.27	+1.32
Trumpet of Patriots	Mark Crocker	2,675	2.44	+2.42
Total formal votes		109,553	94.68	−0.99
Informal votes		6,156	5.32	+0.99
Turnout		115,709	94.07	+3.98
Two-party-preferred result
Liberal	Alex Hawke	58,949	53.81	−6.68
Labor	Dilvan Bircan	50,604	46.19	+6.68
Liberal hold		Swing	−6.68	

2022 Australian federal election: Mitchell
Party	Candidate	Votes	%	±%
Liberal	Alex Hawke	56,918	52.61	−9.44
Labor	Immanuel Selvaraj	27,597	25.51	+1.57
Greens	Matt Cox	12,796	11.83	+3.76
United Australia	Linda Daniel	3,916	3.62	+0.88
Liberal Democrats	Clinton Mead	3,708	3.43	+3.43
One Nation	Donald McKenzie	3,258	3.01	+3.01
Total formal votes		108,193	95.74	+0.78
Informal votes		4,811	4.26	−0.78
Turnout		113,004	93.11	−1.02
Two-party-preferred result
Liberal	Alex Hawke	65,662	60.69	−7.94
Labor	Immanuel Selvaraj	42,531	39.31	+7.94
Liberal hold		Swing	−7.94	

Alluvial diagram for preference flows in the seat of Mitchell in the 2022 federal election. The winning candidate got over 50% of first preference votes, so this alluvial diagram is indicative only, and preference flows were not used to determine the final result. The preference flows were used to determine the two-candidate-preferred.
