= Division of Diamond Valley =

Former Australian federal electoral division

Diamond Valley Australian House of Representatives Division
- Created: 1969
- Abolished: 1984
- Namesake: Shire of Diamond Valley

The Division of Diamond Valley was an Australian Electoral Division in Victoria. The division was created in 1969 and abolished in 1984. It was named for the Shire of Diamond Valley, in turn named after Diamond Creek, a tributary of the Yarra River. At the time of abolition, it was located in the north-eastern suburbs of Melbourne, including Doncaster, Greensborough, Eltham and Templestowe.

When it was initially created in 1969, the division replaced parts of the Division of Lalor and Division of Deakin. At the time, not only did it cover the Doncaster, Greensborough, Eltham and Templestowe areas (previously part of Deakin), but it also covered an even larger area to the north, extending up to the towns of Whittlesea and Kinglake West outside Melbourne (previously part of Lalor). In the 1977 redistribution, it lost most of these formerly-Lalor northern portions to the Division of Scullin, effectively shrinking its area by more than half. The redistribution was its only boundary change during its 15 years of existence.

With the expansion of the Parliament in 1984, the Division was abolished and split amongst multiple divisions:

- majority of the division between Eltham North (inclusive) and Eastern Freeway formed the new Division of Menzies. This also included Eltham, Templestowe, Bulleen and Doncaster.
- the portion north of Eltham North (i.e. Diamond Creek, Yarrambat, Wattle Glen) became part of Division of Casey
- the portion west of Eltham (i.e. Plenty, Greensborough, St Helena, Montmorency) became part of the new Division of McEwen
- the portion west of the Plenty River (i.e. Yallamie and Viewbank) became part of the new Division of Jagajaga

Always held by the government of the day, for most of its existence the seat was marginal between the Australian Labor Party and the Liberal Party. Its eastern half was strongly pro-Liberal, while its western half voted equally as strongly for Labor.

== Members ==
Image	Member	Party	Term	Notes
	Neil Brown (1940–)	Liberal	25 October 1969 – 2 December 1972	Lost seat
	David McKenzie (1933–)	Labor	2 December 1972 – 13 December 1975	Lost seat
	Neil Brown (1940–)	Liberal	13 December 1975 – 5 March 1983	Served as minister under Fraser. Lost seat. Later elected to the Division of Menzies in 1984
	Peter Staples (1947–)	Labor	5 March 1983 – 1 December 1984	Transferred to the Division of Jagajaga after Diamond Valley was abolished in 1984
