= David McKenzie (Victorian politician) =

Australian politician

David McKenzie OAM
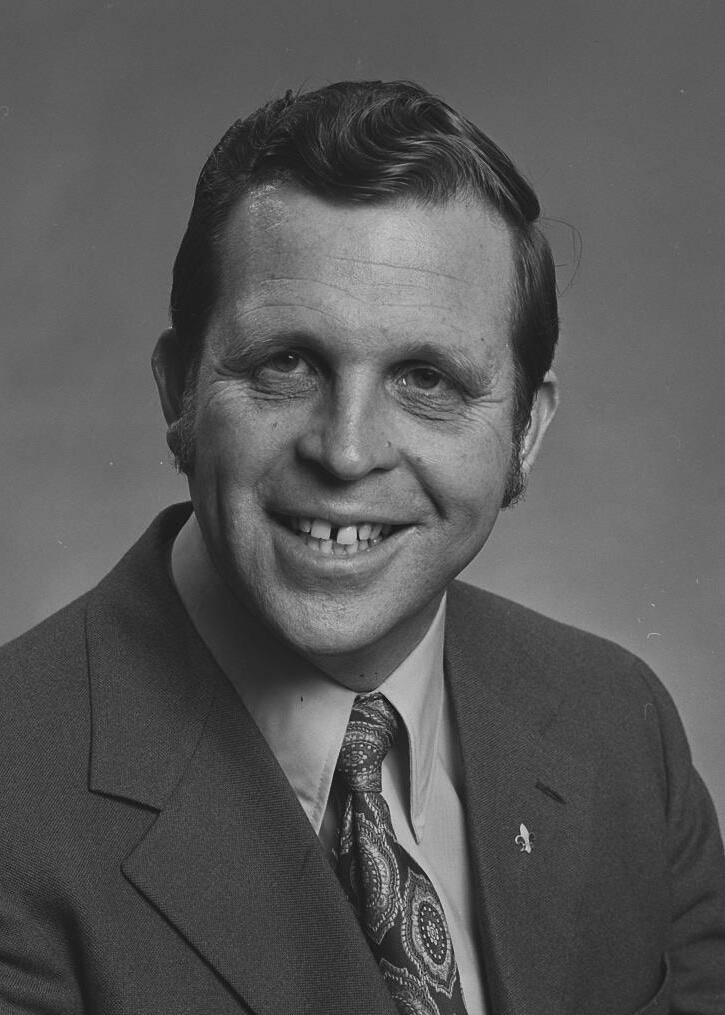

Member of the Australian Parliament for Diamond Valley
- In office 2 December 1972 – 13 December 1975
- Preceded by: Neil Brown
- Succeeded by: Neil Brown

Personal details
- Born: 30 May 1933 (age 93) Melbourne, Victoria
- Party: Australian Labor Party
- Occupation: Teacher

David Charles McKenzie OAM (born 30 May 1933) is a former Australian politician. He was a member of the House of Representatives from 1972 to 1975, representing the Victorian seat of Diamond Valley for the Australian Labor Party (ALP).

== Early life ==
McKenzie was born on 30 May 1933 in Richmond, Victoria. He was a primary school teacher before entering politics.

== Politics ==
McKenzie served on the Diamond Valley Shire Council from 1964 to 1972, including as shire president from 1969 to 1971.

At the 1972 federal election, McKenzie was elected to the House of Representatives as the Labor candidate for Diamond Valley, defeating the incumbent Liberal MP Neil Brown.

In parliament, McKenzie and fellow Victorian backbencher Tony Lamb introduced the Medical Practice Clarification Bill which, if passed, would have legalised abortion in the Australian Capital Territory. The bill was defeated after a conscience vote on 10 May 1973 by 98 votes to 23. McKenzie served on several parliamentary committees including the Standing Committee on Road Safety. He was re-elected at the 1974 election with a narrow margin of 158 votes on the two-party-preferred count. At the resulting parliamentary joint sitting he spoke in favour of one vote, one value reforms.

McKenzie was defeated by Brown at the 1975 election as part of Labor's landslide defeat.

== Honours ==
McKenzie was awarded the Medal of the Order of Australia in the 2020 Queen's Birthday Honours.

Parliament of Australia
Preceded by Neil Brown	Member for Diamond Valley; 1972 – 1975	Succeeded by Neil Brown
