= Neil Brown (Australian politician) =

Australian politician (born 1940)

The Honourable Neil Brown KC
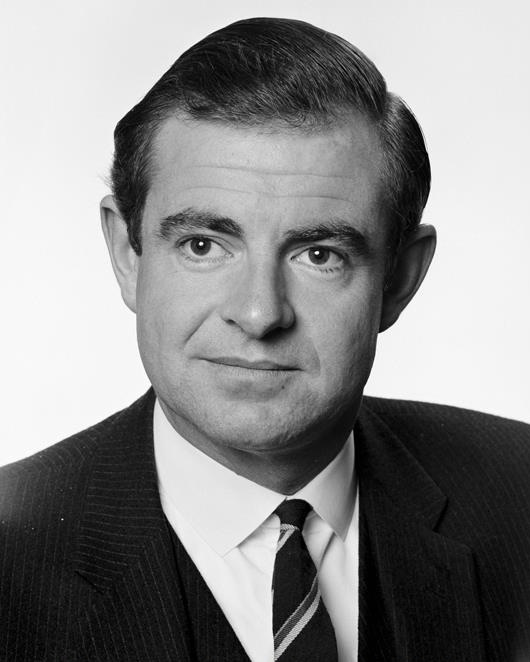

Deputy Leader of the Liberal Party
- In office 5 September 1985 – 17 July 1987
- Leader: John Howard
- Preceded by: John Howard
- Succeeded by: Andrew Peacock

Minister for Communications
- In office 7 May 1982 – 11 March 1983
- Prime Minister: Malcolm Fraser
- Preceded by: Ian Sinclair
- Succeeded by: Michael Duffy

Minister for Employment and Youth Affairs
- In office 6 April 1981 – 7 May 1982
- Prime Minister: Malcolm Fraser
- Preceded by: Ian Viner
- Succeeded by: Ian Macphee

Member of the Australian Parliament for Menzies
- In office 1 December 1984 – 25 February 1991
- Preceded by: New seat
- Succeeded by: Kevin Andrews

Member of the Australian Parliament for Diamond Valley
- In office 13 December 1975 – 5 March 1983
- Preceded by: David McKenzie
- Succeeded by: Peter Staples
- In office 25 October 1969 – 2 December 1972
- Preceded by: New seat
- Succeeded by: David McKenzie

Personal details
- Born: 22 February 1940 (age 86) Melbourne, Victoria, Australia
- Party: Liberal (1955–2001)
- Education: University of Melbourne
- Occupation: Barrister

Neil Anthony Brown KC (born 22 February 1940) is an Australian former politician. He was deputy leader of the Liberal Party and deputy opposition leader from 1985 to 1987, under John Howard. He served as Minister for Employment and Youth Affairs (1981–1982) and Minister for Communications (1982–1983) in the Fraser government.

== Early life ==
Brown grew up in Essendon, in Melbourne's inner north. His father Alexander Brown was an electrical mechanic. He attended Moonee Ponds Central School and University High School, and went on to study law at the University of Melbourne. During his studies he worked part-time at the office of the Victorian Public Solicitor. He was admitted to the Victorian Bar in 1964, and appointed Queen's Counsel in 1980.

== Politics ==
=== Early years ===
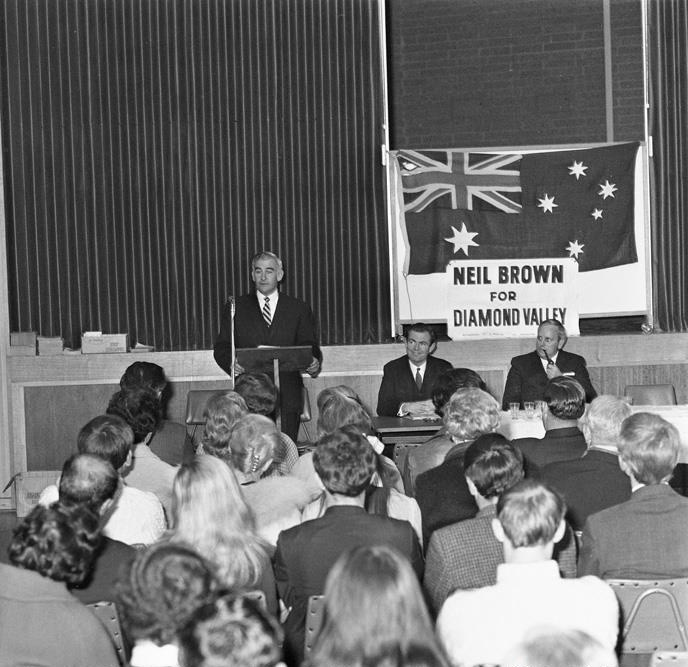
Brown campaign with Billy Snedden in Greensborough in October 1969

Brown joined the Liberal Party in 1955, at the age of 15. He was first elected to the House of Representatives in 1969, standing in the Division of Diamond Valley. He was 29 years old at the time, making him the Coalition's youngest MP. He was defeated by the Labor candidate David McKenzie in 1972, and returned to his legal practice, focusing primarily on industrial law. Brown reclaimed Diamond Valley at the 1975 election in a rematch against McKenzie. In 1980, he spent several weeks in Zimbabwe as the head of a team of Australian observers at the 1980 elections.

=== Fraser government ===
In April 1981, Brown was elevated to the ministry as Minister for Employment and Youth Affairs in the Fraser government. He was briefly appointed Minister for Business and Consumer Affairs following the forced resignation of John Moore in April 1982. His major act in that portfolio was the announcement of an inquiry into the "colour-television affair" which had led to the resignations of Moore and Michael MacKellar. The following month Brown was promoted to cabinet as Minister for Communications. He held that position until the Fraser government was defeated at the 1983 election; he again lost the seat of Diamond Valley to a Labor candidate, in this case, Peter Staples.

=== Opposition ===
At the early 1984 election, Brown re-entered parliament as the member for the newly created Division of Menzies, essentially the more Liberal-friendly eastern portion of his old seat. The western portion became Jagajaga, and Staples transferred there. After the election he was appointed to Andrew Peacock's shadow cabinet as Shadow Attorney-General. In September 1985, Brown was elected deputy leader of the Liberal Party and thus Deputy Leader of the Opposition, roles which had been vacated by John Howard when he replaced Peacock as party leader. He defeated eleven other candidates for the position, finishing with 36 out of 70 votes on the final ballot compared with fifteen for Ian Macphee, eleven for John Moore, and eight for Peter Shack. In December 1985, Brown acted as party leader for two weeks while Howard recovered from an ear operation. However, National Party leader Ian Sinclair was the acting leader of the opposition during that time. Brown served as Howard's deputy until July 1987, when a leadership spill was called in the aftermath of the party's defeat at the 1987 election. After several other candidates emerged, he did not recontest the position and was replaced by Andrew Peacock (an unsuccessful challenger for the leadership against Howard).

Peter Shack, who was an unsuccessful candidate to replace Brown as deputy, made a criticism of Brown as he stated that coming after the Liberals' defeat at the recent 1987 election, its third consecutive defeat, the Liberal Party needed a deputy leader who could give "visible and effective political and parliamentary support to the leader".

Brown remained a Coalition frontbencher – under Howard, Peacock, and John Hewson – until his unexpected resignation from parliament in February 1991. He returned to his law practice. The resulting by-election was won by the Liberal candidate Kevin Andrews.

== Later life ==
In 1993, Brown published a memoir titled On the Other Hand: Sketches and Reflections From Political Life. Reviewing the book for The Canberra Times, Jack Waterford compared it to the Alan Clark Diaries and described the author as "one of the more remarkable politicians to ever reach the top, or near top, of the Liberal Party".

Brown let his membership of the Liberal Party lapse in 2001, due to dissatisfaction with the actions of the Howard government. As of 2006, he was a mediator and arbitrator in domestic and international commercial, trade and construction matters and in Internet domain name disputes.

As of 2019, Brown writes a weekly column for The Spectator Australia.

== Personal life ==
Brown married in 1985, and had two stepchildren from his wife's first marriage. His wife Margaret was the Liberal candidate at the 1989 Greensborough state by-election. They later divorced and she remarried. Brown came out publicly in 1996, when he was included (with his permission) in OutRage magazine's list of prominent homosexuals and lesbians. In a 1998 interview, he said that his wife had known about his sexuality before they married. He described himself as gay, but also agreed that the term bisexual was applicable. He was one of the first Australian politicians – serving or otherwise – to come out publicly.

== Honours ==
- 1 January 2001: Centenary Medal for service to the Commonwealth Parliament and Government from 1969 to 1991

Parliament of Australia
New division	Member for Diamond Valley; 1969–1972	Succeeded by David McKenzie
Preceded by David McKenzie	Member for Diamond Valley; 1975–1983	Succeeded by Peter Staples
New division	Member for Menzies; 1984–1991	Succeeded by Kevin Andrews
Political offices
Preceded by Ian Viner	Minister for Employment and Youth Affairs; 1981–1982	Succeeded by Ian Macphee
Preceded by John Moore	Minister for Business and Consumer Affairs; 1982	Succeeded by Andrew Peacock (Industry and Commerce); Barry Cohen (Consumer Affairs)
Preceded by Ian Sinclair	Minister for Communications; 1982–1983	Succeeded by Michael Duffy
Party political offices
Preceded by John Howard	Deputy Leader of the Liberal Party of Australia; 1985–1987	Succeeded by Andrew Peacock
