= Alfred Ashley-Brown =

Australian politician (1915–1993)

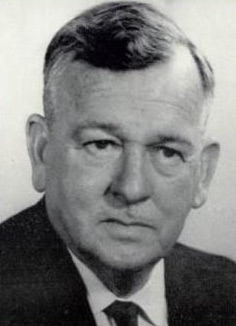

Member of the Australian Parliament for Mitchell
- In office 2 December 1972 – 18 May 1974
- Preceded by: Les Irwin
- Succeeded by: Alan Cadman

Personal details
- Born: 5 October 1915 Sydney
- Died: 5 March 1993 (aged 77)
- Party: Australian Labor Party
- Spouse: Mona Ashley-Brown (née Mona Foggon)
- Children: Henry A Ashley-Brown; Murray F Ashley Brown
- Occupation: Company director

Alfred Ashley-Brown (5 October 1915 – 5 March 1993) was an Australian politician. Born in Sydney, he was a company director, and served in the military 1942–45, achieving the rank of Major. A member of Blacktown City Council, he was the mayor from 1961 to 1965, and 1968 to 1971.

In 1972, he was elected to the Australian House of Representatives as the Labor member for Mitchell, defeating Liberal MP Les Irwin. He was defeated by Liberal Alan Cadman in 1974. Ashley-Brown died in 1993.

Parliament of Australia
Preceded by Les Irwin	Member for Mitchell; 1972–1974	Succeeded by Alan Cadman
