= Members of the Australian House of Representatives, 1987–1990 =

This is a list of members of the Australian House of Representatives from 1987 to 1990, as elected at the 1987 federal election. They were together known as the 35th Parliament.

Member	Party	Electorate	State	In office
Evan Adermann	National	Fairfax	Qld	1972–1990
Ken Aldred	Liberal	Bruce	Vic	1975–1980, 1983–1996
John Anderson ^{[5]}	National	Gwydir	NSW	1989–2007
Neil Andrew	Liberal	Wakefield	SA	1983–2004
Peter Baldwin	Labor	Sydney	NSW	1983–1998
Allen Blanchard	Labor	Moore	WA	1983–1990
Julian Beale	Liberal	Deakin	Vic	1984–1996
Kim Beazley	Labor	Swan	WA	1980–2007
David Beddall	Labor	Rankin	Qld	1983–1998
Gordon Bilney	Labor	Kingston	SA	1983–1996
Neal Blewett	Labor	Bonython	SA	1977–1994
Charles Blunt	National	Richmond	NSW	1984–1990
Lionel Bowen	Labor	Kingsford-Smith	NSW	1969–1990
Ray Braithwaite	National	Dawson	Qld	1975–1996
Bob Brown	Labor	Charlton	NSW	1980–1998
John Brown	Labor	Parramatta	NSW	1977–1990
Neil Brown	Liberal	Menzies	Vic	1969–1972, 1975–1983, 1984–1991
John Brumby	Labor	Bendigo	Vic	1983–1990
Max Burr	Liberal	Lyons	Tas	1975–1993
Alan Cadman	Liberal	Mitchell	NSW	1974–2007
Ewen Cameron	Liberal	Indi	Vic	1977–1993
Don Cameron	Liberal	Moreton	Qld	1966–1983, 1983–1990
Ian Cameron	National	Maranoa	Qld	1980–1990
Graeme Campbell	Labor	Kalgoorlie	WA	1980–1998
Jim Carlton	Liberal	Mackellar	NSW	1977–1994
David Charles	Labor	Isaacs	Vic	1980–1990
Ric Charlesworth	Labor	Perth	WA	1983–1993
Joan Child	Labor	Henty	Vic	1974–1975, 1980–1990
Bob Chynoweth	Labor	Dunkley	Vic	1984–1990, 1993–1996
Peter Cleeland	Labor	McEwen	Vic	1984–1990, 1993–1996
Michael Cobb	National	Parkes	NSW	1984–1998
Barry Cohen	Labor	Robertson	NSW	1969–1990
David Connolly	Liberal	Bradfield	NSW	1974–1996
Brian Courtice	Labor	Hinkler	Qld	1987–1993
Bruce Cowan	National	Lyne	NSW	1980–1993
Mary Crawford	Labor	Forde	Qld	1987–1996
Manfred Cross	Labor	Brisbane	Qld	1961–1975, 1980–1990
Barry Cunningham	Labor	McMillan	Vic	1980–1990, 1993–1996
Elaine Darling	Labor	Lilley	Qld	1980–1993
John Dawkins	Labor	Fremantle	WA	1974–1975, 1977–1994
Don Dobie	Liberal	Cook	NSW	1966–1972, 1975–1996
Alexander Downer	Liberal	Mayo	SA	1984–2008
Stephen Dubois	Labor	St George	NSW	1984–1993
Michael Duffy	Labor	Holt	Vic	1980–1996
Peter Duncan	Labor	Makin	SA	1984–1996
Harry Edwards	Liberal	Berowra	NSW	1972–1993
Ron Edwards	Labor	Stirling	WA	1983–1993
Wendy Fatin	Labor	Brand	WA	1983–1996
Wal Fife	Liberal	Hume	NSW	1975–1993
Tim Fischer	National	Farrer	NSW	1984–2001
Peter Fisher	National	Mallee	Vic	1972–1993
Eric Fitzgibbon	Labor	Hunter	NSW	1984–1996
Ross Free	Labor	Lindsay	NSW	1980–1996
John Gayler	Labor	Leichhardt	Qld	1983–1993
George Gear	Labor	Canning	WA	1983–1996
Bruce Goodluck	Liberal	Franklin	Tas	1975–1993
Russ Gorman	Labor	Greenway	NSW	1983–1996
Ted Grace	Labor	Fowler	NSW	1984–1998
Alan Griffiths	Labor	Maribyrnong	Vic	1983–1996
Steele Hall	Liberal	Boothby	SA	1981–1996
Bob Halverson	Liberal	Casey	Vic	1984–1998
Gerry Hand	Labor	Melbourne	Vic	1983–1993
Elizabeth Harvey	Labor	Hawker	SA	1987–1990
Bob Hawke	Labor	Wills	Vic	1980–1992
David Hawker	Liberal	Wannon	Vic	1983–2010
Bill Hayden ^{[4]}	Labor	Oxley	Qld	1961–1988
John Hewson	Liberal	Wentworth	NSW	1987–1995
Noel Hicks	National	Riverina-Darling	NSW	1980–1998
Clyde Holding	Labor	Melbourne Ports	Vic	1977–1998
Colin Hollis	Labor	Throsby	NSW	1983–1998
John Howard	Liberal	Bennelong	NSW	1974–2007
Brian Howe	Labor	Batman	Vic	1977–1996
Ben Humphreys	Labor	Griffith	Qld	1977–1996
Ralph Hunt ^{[5]}	National	Gwydir	NSW	1969–1990
Chris Hurford ^{[1]}	Labor	Adelaide	SA	1969–1987
Carolyn Jakobsen	Labor	Cowan	WA	1984–1993
Harry Jenkins	Labor	Scullin	Vic	1986–2013
Gary Johns	Labor	Petrie	Qld	1987–1996
Barry Jones	Labor	Lalor	Vic	1977–1998
David Jull	Liberal	Fadden	Qld	1975–1983, 1984–2007
Bob Katter Sr.	National	Kennedy	Qld	1966–1990
Paul Keating	Labor	Blaxland	NSW	1969–1996
Ros Kelly	Labor	Canberra	ACT	1980–1995
Lewis Kent	Labor	Hotham	Vic	1980–1990
John Kerin	Labor	Werriwa	NSW	1972–1975, 1978–1993
Duncan Kerr	Labor	Denison	Tas	1987–2010
Dick Klugman	Labor	Prospect	NSW	1969–1990
Tony Lamb	Labor	Streeton	Vic	1972–1975, 1984–1990
John Langmore	Labor	Fraser	ACT	1984–1997
Michael Lavarch	Labor	Fisher	Qld	1987–1996
Michael Lee	Labor	Dobell	NSW	1984–2001
Ted Lindsay	Labor	Herbert	Qld	1983–1996
Bruce Lloyd	National	Murray	Vic	1971–1996
Michael MacKellar	Liberal	Warringah	NSW	1969–1994
Ian Macphee	Liberal	Goldstein	Vic	1974–1990
Stephen Martin	Labor	Macarthur	NSW	1984–2002
Stewart McArthur	Liberal	Corangamite	Vic	1984–2007
Peter McGauran	National	Gippsland	Vic	1983–2008
Jeannette McHugh	Labor	Phillip	NSW	1983–1996
Leo McLeay	Labor	Grayndler	NSW	1979–2004
Tom McVeigh ^{[3]}	National	Groom	Qld	1972–1988
John Mildren	Labor	Ballarat	Vic	1980–1990
Chris Miles	Liberal	Braddon	Tas	1984–1998
Clarrie Millar	National	Wide Bay	Qld	1974–1990
Peter Milton	Labor	La Trobe	Vic	1980–1990
John Moore	Liberal	Ryan	Qld	1975–2001
Allan Morris	Labor	Newcastle	NSW	1983–2001
Peter Morris	Labor	Shortland	NSW	1972–1998
John Mountford	Labor	Banks	NSW	1980–1990
Garry Nehl	National	Cowper	NSW	1984–2001
Neil O'Keefe	Labor	Burke	Vic	1984–2001
Lloyd O'Neil	Labor	Grey	SA	1983–1993
Andrew Peacock	Liberal	Kooyong	Vic	1966–1994
James Porter	Liberal	Barker	SA	1975–1990
Mike Pratt ^{[1]}	Liberal	Adelaide	SA	1988–1990
Roger Price	Labor	Chifley	NSW	1984–2010
Geoff Prosser	Liberal	Forrest	WA	1987–2007
Gary Punch	Labor	Barton	NSW	1983–1996
Peter Reith	Liberal	Flinders	Vic	1982–1983, 1984–2001
Ian Robinson	National	Page	NSW	1963–1990
Allan Rocher	Liberal	Curtin	WA	1981–1998
Philip Ruddock	Liberal	Dundas	NSW	1973–2016
John Saunderson	Labor	Aston	Vic	1983–1990
Rod Sawford ^{[2]}	Labor	Port Adelaide	SA	1988–2007
Gordon Scholes	Labor	Corio	Vic	1967–1993
Con Sciacca	Labor	Bowman	Qld	1987–2004
John Scott	Labor	Hindmarsh	SA	1980–1993
Les Scott ^{[4]}	Labor	Oxley	Qld	1988–1996
Peter Shack	Liberal	Tangney	WA	1977–1983, 1984–1993
John Sharp	National	Gilmore	NSW	1984–1998
Roger Shipton	Liberal	Higgins	Vic	1975–1990
David Simmons	Labor	Calare	NSW	1983–1996
Ian Sinclair	National	New England	NSW	1963–1998
Warwick Smith	Liberal	Bass	Tas	1984–1993
Jim Snow	Labor	Eden-Monaro	NSW	1983–1996
Warren Snowdon	Labor	Northern Territory	NT	1987–1996, 1998–2022
John Spender	Liberal	North Sydney	NSW	1980–1990
Peter Staples	Labor	Jagajaga	Vic	1983–1996
Kathy Sullivan	Liberal	Moncrieff	Qld	1984–2001
Bill Taylor ^{[3]}	Liberal	Groom	Qld	1988–1998
Andrew Theophanous	Labor	Calwell	Vic	1980–2001
Robert Tickner	Labor	Hughes	NSW	1984–1996
Wilson Tuckey	Liberal	O'Connor	WA	1980–2010
Tom Uren	Labor	Reid	NSW	1958–1990
Alasdair Webster	Liberal	Macquarie	NSW	1984–1993
Stewart West	Labor	Cunningham	NSW	1977–1993
Peter White	Liberal	McPherson	Qld	1981–1990
Ralph Willis	Labor	Gellibrand	Vic	1972–1998
Ian Wilson	Liberal	Sturt	SA	1966–1969, 1972–1993
Bob Woods	Liberal	Lowe	NSW	1987–1993
Michael Wooldridge	Liberal	Chisholm	Vic	1987–2001
Keith Wright	Labor	Capricornia	Qld	1984–1993
Mick Young ^{[2]}	Labor	Port Adelaide	SA	1974–1988

^{1} The Labor member for Adelaide, Chris Hurford, resigned on 31 December 1987; Liberal candidate Mike Pratt won the resulting by-election on 6 February 1988.
^{2} The Labor member for Port Adelaide, Mick Young, resigned on 12 February 1988; Labor candidate Rod Sawford won the resulting by-election on 26 April 1988.
^{3} The National member for the Toowoomba-based Groom, Tom McVeigh, resigned on 29 February 1988; Liberal candidate Bill Taylor won the resulting by-election on 9 April 1988.
^{4} The Labor member for Oxley (QLD), Bill Hayden, resigned on 17 August 1988; Labor candidate Les Scott won the resulting by-election on 8 October 1988.
^{5} The National member for Gwydir (NSW), Ralph Hunt, resigned on 24 February 1989; National candidate John Anderson won the resulting by-election on 15 April 1989.
