= Electoral results for the Division of Oxley =

Australian division election results

This is a list of electoral results for the Division of Oxley in Australian federal elections from the division's creation in 1949 to the present.

== Members ==
Member	Party	Term
Donald Cameron	Liberal	1949–1961
Bill Hayden	Labor	1961–1988
Les Scott	Labor	1988 by–1996
Pauline Hanson	Independent	1996–1997
Pauline Hanson	One Nation	1997–1998
Bernie Ripoll	Labor	1998–2016
Milton Dick	Labor	2016–present

== Election results ==
=== Elections in the 2020s ===
==== 2025 ====
2025 Australian federal election: Oxley
Party	Candidate	Votes	%	±%
Labor	Milton Dick	54,891	52.75	+6.86
Liberal National	Kevin Burns	21,976	21.12	−7.58
Greens	Brandan Holt	13,979	13.43	−0.82
One Nation	Darren Baker	5,738	5.51	−0.33
Family First	William Tento	3,058	2.94	+2.94
Trumpet of Patriots	Mark Maguire	2,985	2.87	+2.87
	Mike Head	1,435	1.38	+1.38
Total formal votes		104,062	96.18	−0.20
Informal votes		4,128	3.82	+0.20
Turnout		108,190	88.36	+0.49
Two-party-preferred result
Labor	Milton Dick	72,003	69.19	+7.60
Liberal National	Kevin Burns	32,059	30.81	−7.60
Labor hold		Swing	+7.60	

==== 2022 ====
2022 Australian federal election: Oxley
Party	Candidate	Votes	%	±%
Labor	Milton Dick	43,785	45.89	+3.36
Liberal National	Kyle McMillen	27,385	28.70	−5.87
Greens	Asha Worsteling	13,595	14.25	+2.61
One Nation	Dylan Kozlowski	5,568	5.84	−0.46
United Australia	Timothy Coombes	5,079	5.32	+2.70
Total formal votes		95,412	96.38	+1.13
Informal votes		3,582	3.62	−1.13
Turnout		98,994	87.87	−3.33
Two-party-preferred result
Labor	Milton Dick	58,768	61.59	+5.20
Liberal National	Kyle McMillen	36,644	38.41	−5.20
Labor hold		Swing	+5.20	

Alluvial diagram for preference flows in the seat of Oxley in the 2022 federal election. indicates at what stage the winning candidate had over 50% of the votes and was declared the winner.

=== Elections in the 2010s ===
==== 2019 ====
2019 Australian federal election: Oxley
Party	Candidate	Votes	%	±%
Labor	Milton Dick	38,501	42.53	−3.35
Liberal National	Russell Bauer	31,290	34.57	+2.41
Greens	Steven Purcell	10,535	11.64	+2.75
One Nation	Janet Lindbom	5,701	6.30	−1.93
United Australia	Ian Ferguson	2,368	2.62	+2.62
Conservative National	Scott Moerland	1,474	1.63	+1.63
Socialist Equality	Mike Head	654	0.72	+0.72
Total formal votes		90,523	95.25	−0.75
Informal votes		4,516	4.75	+0.75
Turnout		95,039	91.20	+0.34
Two-party-preferred result
Labor	Milton Dick	51,050	56.39	−2.62
Liberal National	Russell Bauer	39,473	43.61	+2.62
Labor hold		Swing	−2.62	

==== 2016 ====
2016 Australian federal election: Oxley
Party	Candidate	Votes	%	±%
Labor	Milton Dick	38,419	46.09	+2.99
Liberal National	Bibe Roadley	26,744	32.08	−6.36
Greens	Steven Purcell	7,305	8.76	+3.38
One Nation	Brad Trussell	7,023	8.42	+8.42
Family First	Carrie McCormack	2,734	3.28	+1.23
Katter's Australian	Stephen Lacaze	1,136	1.36	−0.62
Total formal votes		83,361	95.99	+2.91
Informal votes		3,484	4.01	−2.91
Turnout		86,845	91.42	−2.13
Two-party-preferred result
Labor	Milton Dick	49,250	59.08	+5.31
Liberal National	Bibe Roadley	34,111	40.92	−5.31
Labor hold		Swing	+5.31	

==== 2013 ====
2013 Australian federal election: Oxley
Party	Candidate	Votes	%	±%
Labor	Bernie Ripoll	32,589	43.10	−1.61
Liberal National	Andrew Nguyen	29,064	38.44	+0.09
Palmer United	Ricky Tang	5,368	7.10	+7.10
Greens	Martin Stephenson	4,072	5.38	−6.41
Family First	Carrie McCormack	1,551	2.05	−3.10
Katter's Australian	Kathleen Hewlett	1,499	1.98	+1.98
Democratic Labour	Frank Karg	1,075	1.42	+1.42
Rise Up Australia	Scott Moerland	400	0.53	+0.53
Total formal votes		75,618	93.08	−0.24
Informal votes		5,619	6.92	+0.24
Turnout		81,237	93.57	+0.95
Two-party-preferred result
Labor	Bernie Ripoll	40,657	53.77	−2.00
Liberal National	Andrew Nguyen	34,961	46.23	+2.00
Labor hold		Swing	−2.00	

==== 2010 ====
2010 Australian federal election: Oxley
Party	Candidate	Votes	%	±%
Labor	Bernie Ripoll	31,985	44.71	−10.91
Liberal National	Tarnya Smith	27,431	38.35	+2.97
Greens	Des Hoban	8,436	11.79	+6.49
Family First	Timothy Stieler	3,682	5.15	+3.18
Total formal votes		71,534	93.32	−2.62
Informal votes		5,123	6.68	+2.62
Turnout		76,657	92.60	−0.81
Two-party-preferred result
Labor	Bernie Ripoll	39,894	55.77	−5.57
Liberal National	Tarnya Smith	31,640	44.23	+5.57
Labor hold		Swing	−5.57	

=== Elections in the 2000s ===
==== 2007 ====
2007 Australian federal election: Oxley
Party	Candidate	Votes	%	±%
Labor	Bernie Ripoll	47,128	58.56	+10.01
Liberal	Scott White	26,297	32.68	−4.05
Greens	Austin Lund	4,128	5.13	+0.81
Family First	Gregory Roy	1,682	2.09	−1.35
Democrats	Murray Henman	951	1.18	+0.01
Citizens Electoral Council	Brian Haag	289	0.36	−0.60
Total formal votes		80,475	95.79	+2.56
Informal votes		3,535	4.21	−2.56
Turnout		84,010	94.13	−0.59
Two-party-preferred result
Labor	Bernie Ripoll	51,607	64.13	+7.01
Liberal	Scott White	28,868	35.87	−7.01
Labor hold		Swing	+7.01	

==== 2004 ====
2004 Australian federal election: Oxley
Party	Candidate	Votes	%	±%
Labor	Bernie Ripoll	39,807	50.47	+1.19
Liberal	Daniel Smith	26,528	33.63	+1.77
Greens	Kevin Brennan	3,474	4.40	+1.05
Family First	Robert Boyne	2,906	3.68	+3.68
One Nation	Bill Flynn	2,100	2.66	−6.23
Independent	George Pugh	1,920	2.43	+2.43
Democrats	Nicholas Wood	903	1.14	−4.30
Citizens Electoral Council	Brian Haag	881	1.12	+1.12
Socialist Alliance	Michael Myles	358	0.45	+0.45
Total formal votes		78,877	93.00	−1.83
Informal votes		5,936	7.00	+1.83
Turnout		84,813	93.67	−0.67
Two-party-preferred result
Labor	Bernie Ripoll	47,103	59.72	+1.76
Liberal	Daniel Smith	31,774	40.28	−1.76
Labor hold		Swing	+1.76	

==== 2001 ====
2001 Australian federal election: Oxley
Party	Candidate	Votes	%	±%
Labor	Bernie Ripoll	37,797	49.46	+3.71
Liberal	Kevin Parer	23,818	31.17	+6.68
One Nation	Thomas Armstrong	8,085	10.58	−7.08
Democrats	Kate Kunzelmann	4,282	5.60	+1.73
Greens	John McKeon	2,433	3.18	+1.51
Total formal votes		76,415	94.70	−0.87
Informal votes		4,278	5.30	+0.87
Turnout		80,693	95.66	
Two-party-preferred result
Labor	Bernie Ripoll	44,427	58.14	−0.06
Liberal	Kevin Parer	31,988	41.86	+0.06
Labor hold		Swing	−0.06	

=== Elections in the 1990s ===
==== 1998 ====
1998 Australian federal election: Oxley
Party	Candidate	Votes	%	±%
Labor	Bernie Ripoll	32,770	45.75	+1.80
Liberal	Maria Forbes	17,538	24.48	−18.96
One Nation	Colene Hughes	12,653	17.66	+17.66
Independent	Anne Scott	3,053	4.26	+4.26
Democrats	Kate Kunzelmann	2,773	3.87	−2.75
Greens	John McKeon	1,200	1.68	−0.97
Family Law Reform	Simon Trencher	689	0.96	+0.96
Independent	Dele Rule	614	0.86	+0.86
Independent	Xuan Thu Nguyen	338	0.47	+0.47
Total formal votes		71,628	95.57	−1.20
Informal votes		3,324	4.43	+1.20
Turnout		74,952	94.60	−0.34
Two-party-preferred result
Labor	Bernie Ripoll	41,691	58.20	+7.85
Liberal	Maria Forbes	29,937	41.80	−7.85
Labor notional hold		Swing	+7.85	

==== 1996 ====
1996 Australian federal election: Oxley
Party	Candidate	Votes	%	±%
Liberal	Pauline Hanson (disendorsed)	33,960	48.61	+22.86
Labor	Les Scott	27,497	39.36	−15.18
Democrats	David Pullen	4,248	6.08	+0.56
Greens	John McKeon	1,870	2.68	−1.74
Independent	Victor Robb	1,094	1.57	+1.57
	Carl Wyles	765	1.09	+1.09
Indigenous Peoples	Bill Chapman	433	0.62	+0.62
Total formal votes		69,867	97.15	+0.47
Informal votes		2,049	2.85	−0.47
Turnout		71,916	94.94	−0.92
Two-party-preferred result
Liberal	Pauline Hanson (disendorsed)	38,129	54.66	+19.31
Labor	Les Scott	31,622	45.34	−19.31
Independent gain from Labor		Swing	+19.31	

==== 1993 ====
1993 Australian federal election: Oxley
Party	Candidate	Votes	%	±%
Labor	Les Scott	38,216	52.70	+1.47
Liberal	George Blaine	18,520	25.54	−3.03
National	Marie McCullagh	4,121	5.68	+0.48
Democrats	Mary Fernando-Pulle	3,881	5.35	−9.32
Greens	Suzanne Gibbon	3,096	4.27	+4.27
Confederate Action	Geoff Abnett	2,550	3.52	+3.52
Independent	Les Wynne	1,703	2.35	+2.35
	Sue White	423	0.58	+0.58
Total formal votes		72,510	96.68	−0.76
Informal votes		2,488	3.32	+0.76
Turnout		74,998	95.86	
Two-party-preferred result
Labor	Les Scott	45,344	62.58	+1.64
Liberal	George Blaine	27,114	37.42	−1.64
Labor hold		Swing	+1.64	

==== 1990 ====
1990 Australian federal election: Oxley
Party	Candidate	Votes	%	±%
Labor	Les Scott	33,359	52.1	−7.8
Liberal	David Cooke	18,739	29.3	+14.5
Democrats	Althea Rossmuller	9,660	15.1	+10.0
National	Ray Wilms	2,267	3.5	−16.7
Total formal votes		64,025	97.5	
Informal votes		1,660	2.5	
Turnout		65,685	95.5	
Two-party-preferred result
Labor	Les Scott	39,615	62.0	−2.9
Liberal	David Cooke	24,270	38.0	+38.0
Labor hold		Swing	−2.9	

=== Elections in the 1980s ===
==== 1988 by-election ====
Oxley by-election, 1988
Party	Candidate	Votes	%	±%
Labor	Les Scott	28,427	49.1	−10.8
Liberal	David Cooke	15,853	27.4	+12.6
National	Barry Hoffensetz	9,876	17.1	−3.1
Independent	Michael Darby	3,345	5.8	+5.8
Independent	Otto Kuhne	353	0.6	+0.6
Total formal votes		57,854	97.4	
Informal votes		1,563	2.6	
Turnout		59,417	88.5	
Two-party-preferred result
Labor	Les Scott	30,705	53.1	−11.8
Liberal	David Cooke	27,134	46.9	+46.9
Labor hold		Swing	N/A	

==== 1987 ====
1987 Australian federal election: Oxley
Party	Candidate	Votes	%	±%
Labor	Bill Hayden	36,246	59.9	+0.4
National	Barry Hoffensetz	12,248	20.2	+1.2
Liberal	Janice Akroyd	8,948	14.8	−2.0
Democrats	John Loughney	3,081	5.1	+0.4
Total formal votes		60,523	96.8	
Informal votes		2,023	3.2	
Turnout		62,546	92.0	
Two-party-preferred result
Labor	Bill Hayden	39,256	64.9	+1.9
National	Barry Hoffensetz	21,265	35.1	−1.9
Labor hold		Swing	+1.9	

==== 1984 ====
1984 Australian federal election: Oxley
Party	Candidate	Votes	%	±%
Labor	Bill Hayden	32,921	59.5	−5.0
National	Charles Groves	10,537	19.0	+19.0
Liberal	Les Woodforth	9,292	16.8	−12.9
Democrats	George Hannaford	2,621	4.7	−0.3
Total formal votes		55,371	95.4	
Informal votes		2,655	4.6	
Turnout		58,026	93.8	
Two-party-preferred result
Labor	Bill Hayden	34,903	63.0	−5.3
National	Charles Groves	20,474	37.0	+37.0
Labor hold		Swing	−5.3	

==== 1983 ====
1983 Australian federal election: Oxley
Party	Candidate	Votes	%	±%
Labor	Bill Hayden	49,837	66.9	+2.8
Liberal	Les Woodforth	20,346	27.3	−1.8
Democrats	Wayne Martin	3,699	5.0	+0.9
Socialist Workers	Juanita Keig	668	0.9	+0.9
Total formal votes		74,550	98.7	
Informal votes		957	1.3	
Turnout		75,507	93.5	
Two-party-preferred result
Labor	Bill Hayden		70.7	+1.9
Liberal	Les Woodforth		29.3	−1.9
Labor hold		Swing	+1.9	

==== 1980 ====
1980 Australian federal election: Oxley
Party	Candidate	Votes	%	±%
Labor	Bill Hayden	45,094	64.1	+9.1
Liberal	Ronda Herrmann	20,461	29.1	−7.9
Democrats	Wayne Martin	2,896	4.1	−2.7
Independent	Miriam Cope	1,311	1.9	+1.9
	Robert Voysey	620	0.9	+0.9
Total formal votes		70,382	98.0	
Informal votes		1,432	2.0	
Turnout		71,814	95.1	
Two-party-preferred result
Labor	Bill Hayden		68.8	+10.3
Liberal	Ronda Herrmann		31.2	−10.3
Labor hold		Swing	+10.3	

=== Elections in the 1970s ===
==== 1977 ====
1977 Australian federal election: Oxley
Party	Candidate	Votes	%	±%
Labor	Bill Hayden	36,084	55.0	+4.8
Liberal	Robert Walker	24,306	37.0	+14.3
Democrats	Rowlynd Jones	4,446	6.8	+6.8
Progress	Neil Russell	784	1.2	−1.0
Total formal votes		65,620	98.6	
Informal votes		910	1.4	
Turnout		66,530	95.6	
Two-party-preferred result
Labor	Bill Hayden		58.5	+4.7
Liberal	Robert Walker		41.5	+41.5
Labor hold		Swing	+4.7	

==== 1975 ====
1975 Australian federal election: Oxley
Party	Candidate	Votes	%	±%
Labor	Bill Hayden	36,879	50.2	−6.8
National Country	James Shapcott	18,286	24.9	+24.9
Liberal	Cornelis Frederiks	16,711	22.7	−18.1
Workers	Neil Russell	1,631	2.2	+2.2
Total formal votes		73,507	98.6	
Informal votes		1,036	1.4	
Turnout		74,543	95.8	
Two-party-preferred result
Labor	Bill Hayden		53.8	−4.5
National Country	James Shapcott		46.2	+46.2
Labor hold		Swing	−4.5	

==== 1974 ====
1974 Australian federal election: Oxley
Party	Candidate	Votes	%	±%
Labor	Bill Hayden	39,323	57.0	−8.8
Liberal	Allan Whybird	28,152	40.8	+10.5
Australia	Arthur Smith	1,489	2.2	+2.2
Total formal votes		68,964	98.5	
Informal votes		1,039	1.5	
Turnout		70,003	95.8	
Two-party-preferred result
Labor	Bill Hayden		58.3	−8.3
Liberal	Allan Whybird		41.7	+8.3
Labor hold		Swing	−8.3	

==== 1972 ====
1972 Australian federal election: Oxley
Party	Candidate	Votes	%	±%
Labor	Bill Hayden	38,372	65.8	−1.3
Liberal	Peter Williams	17,655	30.3	+3.4
Democratic Labor	Miroslav Jansky	2,248	3.9	−2.1
Total formal votes		58,275	97.9	
Informal votes		1,233	2.1	
Turnout		59,508	95.9	
Two-party-preferred result
Labor	Bill Hayden		66.6	−2.5
Liberal	Peter Williams		33.4	+2.5
Labor hold		Swing	−2.5	

=== Elections in the 1960s ===
==== 1969 ====
1969 Australian federal election: Oxley
Party	Candidate	Votes	%	±%
Labor	Bill Hayden	34,084	67.1	+8.2
Liberal	Cyril Morgan	13,676	26.9	+7.2
Democratic Labor	Gavan Duffy	3,048	6.0	+1.9
Total formal votes		50,808	98.2	
Informal votes		935	1.8	
Turnout		51,743	94.9	
Two-party-preferred result
Labor	Bill Hayden		69.1	+7.8
Liberal	Cyril Morgan		30.9	−7.8
Labor hold		Swing	+7.8	

==== 1966 ====
1966 Australian federal election: Oxley
Party	Candidate	Votes	%	±%
Labor	Bill Hayden	25,692	57.2	−0.4
Liberal	Colin Logan	9,627	21.4	−16.6
Country	Stewart Fletcher	7,755	17.3	+17.3
Democratic Labor	Thomas Dalton	1,832	4.1	−0.3
Total formal votes		44,906	98.6	
Informal votes		638	1.4	
Turnout		45,544	96.4	
Two-party-preferred result
Labor	Bill Hayden		59.6	+1.3
Liberal	Colin Logan		40.4	−1.3
Labor hold		Swing	+1.3	

==== 1963 ====
1963 Australian federal election: Oxley
Party	Candidate	Votes	%	±%
Labor	Bill Hayden	25,194	57.6	+4.9
Liberal	Arthur Chresby	16,600	38.0	−5.3
Democratic Labor	Terence Burns	1,942	4.4	+0.3
Total formal votes		43,736	98.3	
Informal votes		761	1.7	
Turnout		44,497	97.0	
Two-party-preferred result
Labor	Bill Hayden		58.3	+4.8
Liberal	Arthur Chresby		41.7	−4.8
Labor hold		Swing	+4.8	

==== 1961 ====
1961 Australian federal election: Oxley
Party	Candidate	Votes	%	±%
Labor	Bill Hayden	22,247	52.7	+10.8
Liberal	Donald Cameron	18,222	43.3	−12.4
Queensland Labor	Kenneth Rawle	1,720	4.1	+1.8
Total formal votes		42,239	98.1	
Informal votes		800	1.9	
Turnout		43,039	96.6	
Two-party-preferred result
Labor	Bill Hayden		53.5	+9.4
Liberal	Donald Cameron		46.5	−9.4
Labor gain from Liberal		Swing	+9.4	

=== Elections in the 1950s ===
==== 1958 ====
1958 Australian federal election: Oxley
Party	Candidate	Votes	%	±%
Liberal	Donald Cameron	22,555	55.7	−3.5
Labor	Robert Warren	19,966	41.9	+5.4
Communist	Wallace Dawson	939	2.3	+0.6
Total formal votes		40,460	97.8	
Informal votes		927	2.2	
Turnout		41,387	96.9	
Two-party-preferred result
Liberal	Donald Cameron		55.9	−4.9
Labor	Robert Warren		44.1	+4.9
Liberal hold		Swing	−4.9	

==== 1955 ====
1955 Australian federal election: Oxley
Party	Candidate	Votes	%	±%
Liberal	Donald Cameron	23,472	59.2	+2.5
Labor	Norman Thomas	14,468	36.5	−4.6
Independent	James Dwyer	1,070	2.7	+2.7
Communist	Mervyn Welsby	668	1.7	−0.3
Total formal votes		39,678	97.9	
Informal votes		849	2.1	
Turnout		40,527	97.0	
Two-party-preferred result
Liberal	Donald Cameron		60.8	+3.1
Labor	Norman Thomas		39.2	−3.1
Liberal hold		Swing	+3.1	

==== 1954 ====
1954 Australian federal election: Oxley
Party	Candidate	Votes	%	±%
Liberal	Donald Cameron	20,822	55.8	−2.4
Labor	Norman Thomas	15,663	42.0	+1.8
Communist	Tom Millar	841	2.3	+0.6
Total formal votes		37,326	99.3	
Informal votes		273	0.7	
Turnout		37,599	97.3	
Two-party-preferred result
Liberal	Donald Cameron		56.0	−2.4
Labor	Norman Thomas		44.0	+2.4
Liberal hold		Swing	−2.4	

==== 1951 ====
1951 Australian federal election: Oxley
Party	Candidate	Votes	%	±%
Liberal	Donald Cameron	21,219	58.2	+16.1
Labor	Andrew Crilly	14,648	40.2	−0.1
Communist	Frank O'Connor	602	1.7	+0.1
Total formal votes		36,469	98.2	
Informal votes		656	1.8	
Turnout		37,125	97.5	
Two-party-preferred result
Liberal	Donald Cameron		58.4	+1.6
Labor	Andrew Crilly		41.6	−1.6
Liberal hold		Swing	+1.6	

=== Elections in the 1940s ===
==== 1949 ====
1949 Australian federal election: Oxley
Party	Candidate	Votes	%	±%
Liberal	Donald Cameron	14,895	42.1	+8.9
Labor	Evan Marginson	14,268	40.3	+0.2
Country	John Martin	5,658	16.0	−11.0
Communist	Wallace Dawson	576	1.6	+1.6
Total formal votes		35,397	98.0	
Informal votes		726	2.0	
Turnout		36,123	96.7	
Two-party-preferred result
Liberal	Donald Cameron	20,097	56.8	−3.0
Labor	Evan Marginson	15,300	43.2	+3.0
Liberal notional hold		Swing	−3.0	
