= Hayden shadow ministry =

The Shadow Ministry of Bill Hayden was the opposition Australian Labor Party shadow ministry of Australia from 29 December 1977 to 3 February 1983, opposing Malcolm Fraser's Coalition ministry.

The shadow cabinet is a group of senior Opposition spokespeople who form an alternative cabinet of Australia, the members of which shadow or mark each individual minister or portfolio of the government.

Bill Hayden became Leader of the Opposition upon his election as leader of the Labor Party on 22 December 1977, and his first shadow cabinet was appointed. A second, rearranged shadow cabinet led by Hayden was appointed after Labor lost the 1980 election.

== Shadow Ministry (1977-1980) ==
The following were members of the shadow cabinet from 29 December 1977 to 7 November 1980:

Shadow Minister	Portfolio
Bill Hayden MP	Leader of the Opposition; Leader of the Labor Party
Lionel Bowen MP	Deputy Leader of the Opposition; Shadow Attorney-General; Shadow Minister for Overseas Trade and Special Trade Representations; Deputy Leader of the Labor Party
Senator Ken Wriedt	Leader of the Opposition in the Senate; Shadow Minister for Foreign Affairs
Senator John Button	Deputy Leader of the Opposition in the Senate; Shadow Minister for Education and Science
Dr Moss Cass MP	Shadow Minister for Immigration and Ethnic Affairs
Barry Cohen MP	Shadow Minister for Environment, Sport and Recreation; Shadow Minister for Tourism and Home Affairs
Doug Everingham MP	Shadow Minister for Aboriginal Affairs and Northern Australia (to 19 March 1980); Shadow Minister for the Australian Capital Territory and Veterans' Affairs (from 19 March 1980)
Senator Arthur Gietzelt	Shadow Minister for Consumer Affairs; Shadow Minister for Administrative Services (5 February 1978 to 19 March 1980)
Senator Donald Grimes	Shadow Minister for Social Security
Chris Hurford MP	Shadow Minister for Industry and Commerce, Productivity and Consumer Affairs
Ted Innes MP	Shadow Minister for Australian Capital Territory, Post and Telecommunications
Paul Keating MP	Shadow Minister for Resources and Energy. Northern Australia (from 19 March 1980)
Dick Klugman MP	Shadow Minister for Veterans' Affairs; Shadow Minister for Administrative Services (from 19 March 1980)
Peter Morris MP	Shadow Minister for Transport
Senator Susan Ryan	Shadow Minister for Arts and Letters; Shadow Minister for Communications (to 19 March 1980); Shadow Minister for Women's Affairs (from 1 February 1979)
Gordon Scholes MP	Shadow Minister for Defence
Tom Uren MP	Shadow Minister for Urban and Regional Affairs; Shadow Minister for Decentralisation, Local Government, Housing and Construction
Senator Peter Walsh	Shadow Minister for Primary Industry; Shadow Minister for Administrative Services (to 5 February 1978)
Ralph Willis MP	Shadow Treasurer; Shadow Minister for Finance and Economic Development
Mick Young MP	Shadow Minister for Employment and Industrial Relations (to 17 September 1980)
Neal Blewett MP	Shadow Minister for Health (from 19 March 1980)
Stewart West MP	Shadow Minister for Aboriginal Affairs (from 19 March 1980)
Mr Bob Hawke	Shadow Minister for Industrial Relations, Employment, Youth Affairs (from 17 September 1980); Candidate for Wills

== Shadow Ministry (1980-1983) ==
The following were members of the Shadow Cabinet:

Shadow Minister	Portfolio
The Hon. Bill Hayden MP	Leader of the Opposition; Leader of the Labor Party
The Hon. Lionel Bowen MP	Deputy Leader of the Opposition; Shadow Minister for Foreign Affairs; Deputy Leader of the Labor Party
Senator John Button	Leader of the Opposition in the Senate; Shadow Minister for Communications; Shadow Minister for Rural and Provincial Development
Senator Don Grimes	Deputy Leader of the Opposition in the Senate; Shadow Minister for Social Security and Veterans' Affairs
Neal Blewett MP	Shadow Minister for Health; Shadow Minister for Tasmanian Affairs
John Brown MP	Shadow Minister for Business and Consumer Affairs, Shadow Minister for Tourism, Physical Fitness and Sport
John Dawkins MP	Shadow Minister for Education
Senator Gareth Evans	Shadow Attorney-General
Senator Arthur Gietzelt	Shadow Minister for Administrative Services
Bob Hawke MP	Shadow Minister for Industrial Relations and Employment; Shadow Minister for Youth Affairs
Chris Hurford MP	Shadow Minister for Industry and Commerce
The Hon. Paul Keating MP	Shadow Minister for Resources and Energy (to 14 January 1983); Shadow Treasurer (from 14 January 1983)
John Kerin MP	Shadow Minister for Primary Industry
Barry Jones MP	Shadow Minister for Science and Technology
Peter Morris MP	Shadow Minister for Transport
Senator Susan Ryan	Shadow Minister for Aboriginal Affairs; Shadow Minister for Arts and Letters; Shadow Minister for Women's Affairs
The Hon. Gordon Scholes MP	Shadow Minister for Defence; Shadow Minister for the Australian Capital Territory
The Hon. Tom Uren MP	Shadow Minister for Urban and Regional Affairs
Senator Peter Walsh	Shadow Minister for Finance; Shadow Minister for Trade; Shadow Minister for National Development
Stewart West MP	Shadow Minister for Environment and Conservation
Ralph Willis MP	Shadow Treasurer (to 14 January 1983); Shadow Minister for Economic Development (from 14 January 1983)
Mick Young MP	Shadow Minister for Immigration

== See also ==
- Shadow Ministry of Gough Whitlam (1975–77)
- Shadow Ministry of Bob Hawke
- Third Fraser ministry
- Fourth Fraser ministry
