= Hawke shadow ministry =

The Shadow Ministry of Bob Hawke was the opposition Australian Labor Party shadow ministry of Australia from 8 February 1983 to 11 March 1983, opposing Malcolm Fraser's Coalition ministry.

The shadow cabinet is a group of senior Opposition spokespeople who form an alternative Cabinet to the government's, whose members shadow or mark each individual Minister or portfolio of the Government.

Bob Hawke became Leader of the Opposition upon his election as leader of the Australian Labor Party on 8 February 1983, and appointed a Shadow Cabinet. The Shadow Ministry never sat in Parliament, having spent the entirety of its short existence in the election campaign which Labor won.

== Shadow Ministry ==
The following were members of the Shadow Cabinet:

Shadow Minister	Portfolio
Bob Hawke MP	Leader of the Opposition; Leader of the Labor Party; Shadow Minister for Industrial Relations
The Hon. Lionel Bowen MP	Deputy Leader of the Opposition; Shadow Minister for Trade; Deputy Leader of the Labor Party
Senator John Button	Leader of the Opposition in the Senate; Shadow Minister for Communications; Shadow Minister for Rural and Provincial Development
Senator Don Grimes	Deputy Leader of the Opposition in the Senate; Shadow Minister for Social Security and Veterans' Affairs
Neal Blewett MP	Shadow Minister for Health; Shadow Minister for Tasmanian Affairs
John Brown MP	Shadow Minister for Business and Consumer Affairs, Shadow Minister for Tourism, Physical Fitness and Sport
John Dawkins MP	Shadow Minister for Education
Senator Gareth Evans	Shadow Attorney-General
Senator Arthur Gietzelt	Shadow Minister for Administrative Services
The Hon. Bill Hayden MP	Shadow Minister for Foreign Affairs
Chris Hurford MP	Shadow Minister for Industry and Commerce
The Hon. Paul Keating MP	Shadow Treasurer
John Kerin MP	Shadow Minister for Primary Industry
Barry Jones MP	Shadow Minister for Science and Technology
Peter Morris MP	Shadow Minister for Transport
Senator Susan Ryan	Shadow Minister for Aboriginal Affairs; Shadow Minister for Arts and Letters; Shadow Minister for Women's Affairs
The Hon. Gordon Scholes MP	Shadow Minister for Defence; Shadow Minister for the Australian Capital Territory
The Hon. Tom Uren MP	Shadow Minister for Urban and Regional Affairs
Senator Peter Walsh	Shadow Minister for Finance; Shadow Minister for National Development
Stewart West MP	Shadow Minister for Environment and Conservation
Ralph Willis MP	Shadow Minister for Economic Development
Mick Young MP	Shadow Minister for Immigration; Shadow Minister for Employment; Shadow Minister for Youth Affairs

== See also ==
- Shadow Ministry of Bill Hayden
- First Hawke Ministry
- Fourth Fraser Ministry
