= Whitlam shadow ministry (1975–77) =

The Shadow Ministry of Gough Whitlam was the opposition Australian Labor Party shadow ministry of Australia from 21 January 1976 to 29 December 1977, opposing Malcolm Fraser's Coalition ministry.

The shadow cabinet is a group of senior Opposition spokespeople who form an alternative Cabinet to the government's, whose members shadow or mark each individual Minister or portfolio of the Government.

Whitlam had not formed a Shadow Ministry after losing government during the 1975 constitutional crisis and had used the title "Leader of the Majority in the House of Representatives" for himself rather than Leader of the Opposition. When the Labor Party lost their majority at the 1975 election, Whitlam returned to use of the Opposition Leader title and a new Shadow Ministry was appointed.

== Shadow Ministry (1975–1977) ==
The following were members of the Shadow Cabinet from 21 January 1976 to 29 December 1977:

Shadow Minister	Portfolio
Gough Whitlam QC MP	Leader of the Opposition; Shadow Minister for Foreign Affairs; Shadow Minister for the Arts (from 25 March 1976); Leader of the Labor Party
Tom Uren MP	Deputy Leader of the Opposition; Shadow Minister for Urban and Regional Affairs; Deputy Leader of the Labor Party
Senator Ken Wriedt	Leader of the Opposition in the Senate; Shadow Minister for Minerals and Energy (to 25 March 1976); Shadow Minister for Education (from 25 March 1976)
Senator Jim Keeffe	Deputy Leader of the Opposition in the Senate (to 31 May 1977); Shadow Minister for Northern Australia and Aboriginal Affairs
Kim Beazley MP	Shadow Minister for Education; Shadow Minister for Defence (to 15 March 1976)
Lionel Bowen MP	Shadow Attorney-General
Senator John Button	Shadow Minister for Construction (to 25 March 1976); Shadow Minister for Media and Films (from 25 March 1976)
Dr Moss Cass MP	Shadow Minister for Health (to 31 May 1977)
Rex Connor MP	Shadow Minister for Science (to 22 August 1977)
Senator Donald Grimes	Shadow Minister for Social Security; Shadow Minister for Repatriation and Compensation (25 March 1976 to 2 June 1977); Shadow Minister for Veterans' Affairs and Compensation (from 2 June 1977)
Chris Hurford MP	Shadow Treasurer; Shadow Minister for Trade (from 2 June 1977)
Ted Innes MP	Shadow Minister for Immigration and Ethnic Affairs
Paul Keating MP	Shadow Minister for Agriculture (to 25 March 1976); Shadow Minister for Minerals and Energy (from 25 March 1976)
Senator Doug McClelland	Shadow Minister for Administrative Services
Peter Morris MP	Shadow Minister for Transport
Senator Tony Mulvihill	Shadow Minister for Environment
Gordon Scholes MP	Shadow Minister for Postal and Telecommunications (to 2 June 1977); Shadow Minister for Primary Industry (from 2 June 1977)
Senator John Wheeldon	Shadow Minister for Repatriation and Compensation (to 19 March 1976); Shadow Minister for Media and Films (to 19 March 1976)
Ralph Willis MP	Shadow Minister for Industrial Relations
Mick Young MP	Shadow Minister for Industry and Commerce, Business and Consumer Affairs
Senator Arthur Gietzelt	Shadow Minister for Agriculture (25 March 1976 to 31 May 1977)
Bill Hayden MP	Shadow Minister for Health and Social Security
Charles Jones MP	Shadow Minister for Transport
Dr Dick Klugman MP	Shadow Minister for Health and Science (from 2 June 1977)

== See also ==
- Second Whitlam ministry
- Second Fraser ministry
- Shadow Ministry of Bill Hayden
