= 1988 Oxley by-election =

| 8 October 1988 |
| | First party | Second party | Third party |
|---|---|---|---|
| Candidate | Les Scott | David Cooke | Barry Hoffensetz |
| Party | Labor | Liberal | National |
| Popular vote | 28,427 | 15,853 | 9,876 |
| Percentage | 49.1% | 27.6% | 17.1% |
| Swing | ▼10.8 | ▲12.7 | ▼3.2 |
| TPP | 53.2% | 45.9% |
| TPP swing | ▼11.8 | ▲45.9 |
MP before election
Bill Hayden
Labor
Elected MP
Les Scott
Labor

A by-election was held for the Australian House of Representatives seat of Oxley on 8 October 1988. This was triggered by the resignation of former Labor Party leader Bill Hayden to become Governor-General.

Both the Liberal Party and the National Party fielded candidates; the Liberal Party overtook the National Party into second place. The election was won by Labor candidate Les Scott, despite an 11.8% swing to the Liberals.

== Candidates ==
- Independent – Michael Darby. Darby had previously contested Werriwa in New South Wales in the 1974 election for the Liberal Party. He later contested Dickson in the supplementary election in 1993 as an independent, and was fifth on the Liberal ticket for the Senate in New South Wales in 2004. In 2007 he contested Dobell for the Christian Democrats.
- Independent – Otto Kuhne. Kuhne later contested McPherson in the 1990 election as an independent, and Fadden in the 1993 election as a Natural Law Party candidate.
- National Party of Australia – Barry Hoffensetz, the party's 1987 candidate.
- Liberal Party of Australia – David Cooke.
- Australian Labor Party – Les Scott, a bank officer.

== Results ==
Oxley by-election, 1988
| Party | Candidate | Votes | % | ±% |
|---|---|---|---|---|
| Labor | Les Scott | 28,427 | 49.1 | −10.8 |
| Liberal | David Cooke | 15,853 | 27.4 | +12.6 |
| National | Barry Hoffensetz | 9,876 | 17.1 | −3.1 |
| Independent | Michael Darby | 3,345 | 5.8 | +5.8 |
| Independent | Otto Kuhne | 353 | 0.6 | +0.6 |
| Total formal votes | | 57,854 | 97.4 | |
| Informal votes | | 1,563 | 2.6 | |
| Turnout | | 59,417 | 88.5 | |
Two-party-preferred result
| Labor | Les Scott | 30,705 | 53.1 | −11.8 |
| Liberal | David Cooke | 27,134 | 46.9 | +46.9 |
| Labor hold | | Swing | N/A | |

== See also ==
- List of Australian federal by-elections
