= Tony Mulvihill =

Australian politician

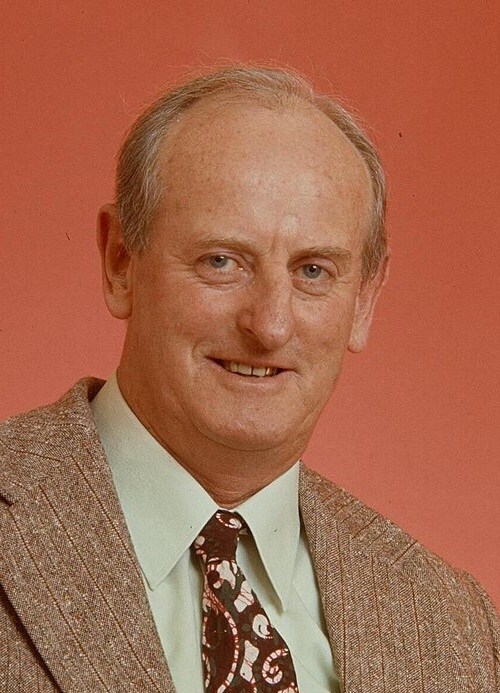

Senator for New South Wales
- In office 1 July 1965 – 4 February 1983

Personal details
- Born: 27 April 1919 North Ryde, New South Wales, Australia
- Died: 10 December 2000 (aged 81) Katoomba, New South Wales, Australia
- Party: Labor
- Spouse: Pamela O'Connell (m. 1970)
- Occupation: Unionist, railway worker

James Anthony Mulvihill (27 April 1919 – 10 December 2000) was an Australian politician. He was a Senator for New South Wales from 1965 to 1983, representing the Australian Labor Party (ALP). He served as the party's assistant state secretary from 1956 to 1964 and was a railway worker and trade unionist before entering parliament.

== Early life ==
Mulvihill was born on 27 April 1919 in North Ryde, New South Wales. He was the only child of Agnes Ellen (née McNamara) and James Bernard Mulvihill. His father was an ironworker at the Mortlake gasworks and an active trade unionist.

Mulvihill was educated at St Mary's Catholic Primary School in Concord and De La Salle College Ashfield. He left school at the age of 15 and faced periods of unemployment before joining the Eveleigh Railway Workshops in 1935. He worked as a locomotive fireman and overhead crane driver, joining the Australian Railways Union (ARU) where he was a shop steward, branch trustee and delegate to the Labor Council of New South Wales.

== Politics ==
Mulvihill joined the ALP in 1943 and was president of its Concord branch from 1947 to 1956. He was elected to the party's state executive in 1951 with the support of ARU state president John Ferguson. He and Ferguson emerged as opponents of the anti-communist Industrial Groups in the lead-up to the Australian Labor Party split of 1955.

In 1956, Mulvihill was appointed assistant general secretary of the ALP following an intervention by the federal executive into the New South Wales branch. He served in the position until 1964, establishing a close working relationship with general secretary Bill Colbourne and helping avoid the larger party split that occurred in Victoria.

=== Senate ===
Mulvihill was placed second on the ALP's ticket in New South Wales at the 1964 Senate election, winning a six-year term beginning on 1 July 1965. He was re-elected at the 1970 election and the 1974 and 1975 double dissolutions, winning a final six-year term at the 1977 election and retiring following another double dissolution in 1983.

Mulvihill served as ALP spokesperson for the environment in the Whitlam shadow ministry from 1976 to 1977. He was an "early and persistent advocate of conservation of the environment, the preservation of native fauna, and animal rights". In the early 1950s he began advocating for the creation of a green belt around Sydney. In parliament, Mulvihill supported the creation of the Kakadu National Park and opposed the creation of the adjacent Ranger Uranium Mine and uranium mining in general. He was also "prominent in the campaign to save the Colong Caves from mining" and advocated for the protection of endangered species including the Cape Barren goose.

In the lead-up to the 1977 election, Mulvihill acted as an opposition spokesman on immigration. In November 1977 he called for Vietnamese boat people reaching Australia to be returned to Thailand, and said that Australia should consider withdrawing aid to Thailand if it refused to take more refugees. In response, Mulvihill was publicly criticised by Wichet Suthayakhom, the Thai ambassador to Australia.

== Personal life ==
In 1970, Mulvihill married Pamela O'Connell; the couple did not have children. He died on 10 December 2000, aged 83.
