= Donald Alastair Cameron =

Australian politician and diplomat (1900 – 1974)

The Honourable Donald Alistair Cameron OBE
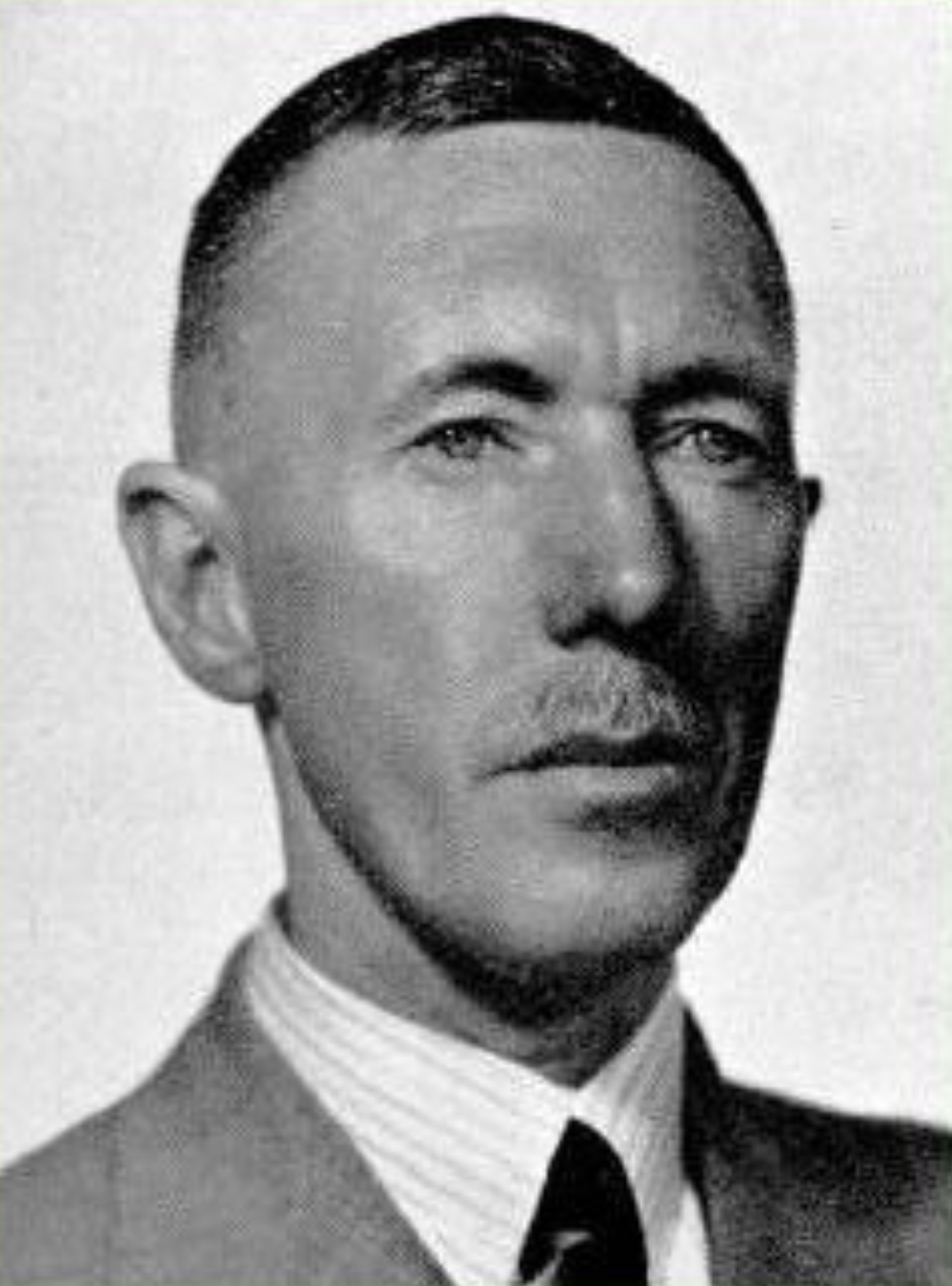

Minister for Health
- In office 11 January 1956 – 22 December 1961
- Prime Minister: Robert Menzies
- Preceded by: Earle Page
- Succeeded by: Harrie Wade

Member of the Australian Parliament for Oxley
- In office 10 December 1949 – 9 December 1961
- Preceded by: New seat
- Succeeded by: Bill Hayden

Personal details
- Born: 17 March 1900 Ipswich, Queensland, Australia
- Died: 5 January 1974 (aged 73) Chermside, Queensland, Australia
- Party: Liberal
- Spouse: Rhoda Florence McLean

Military service
- Allegiance: Australia
- Branch/service: Citizen Military Forces (1936–40); Second Australian Imperial Force (1940–45)
- Years of service: 1936–1945
- Rank: Lieutenant colonel
- Commands: 2/1st Field Ambulance
- Battles/wars: Second World War
- Awards: Officer of the Order of the British Empire; Mentioned in Despatches

Donald Alastair Cameron OBE (17 March 1900 – 5 January 1974) was an Australian politician. He was a member of the Liberal Party and served in federal parliament from 1946 to 1961, representing the Division of Oxley in Queensland. He was a doctor by profession and held ministerial office as Minister for Health in the Menzies government from 1956 to 1961. After losing his seat he served a term as High Commissioner to New Zealand (1962–1965).

== Early life ==
Cameron was born in Ipswich, Queensland. He received his education at Ipswich Grammar School and the University of Sydney, where he graduated in arts and medicine. From 1927 to 1933 he was a medical officer at the Royal Prince Alfred Hospital and the Coast Hospital in Sydney. In 1933, he married Rhoda Florence McLean. They settled at Ipswich where he practised medicine until the Second World War, in which he served as a colonel in the Australian Army Medical Corps in the Mediterranean and Middle East Theatre and New Guinea. He was mentioned in despatches and made an Officer of the Order of the British Empire (OBE) in 1946.

== Politics ==
After the war, Cameron joined the newly formed Liberal Party of Australia and, at the 1949 election, he was elected to the Australian House of Representatives for the new seat of Oxley, based on Ipswich. He was Minister for Health in the Menzies government from 1956 to 1961. He was also appointed minister in charge of the Commonwealth Scientific and Industrial Research Organisation in 1960 following Richard Casey's retirement. At the 1961 election he was unexpectedly defeated by the young Australian Labor Party candidate Bill Hayden.

== Later life ==
After his election defeat, Cameron worked as Commonwealth medical officer in Sydney and was Australia's High Commissioner to New Zealand from 1962 to 1965. He was then a general practitioner in the Brisbane suburb of Nundah.

== Death ==
Cameron died in the Brisbane suburb of Chermside.

Political offices
Preceded by Earle Page	Minister for Health; 1956–1961	Succeeded by Harrie Wade
Preceded by Richard Casey	Minister in charge of the Commonwealth Scientific and Industrial Research Organisation; 1960–1961	Succeeded by Robert Menzies
Parliament of Australia
New division	Member for Oxley; 1949–1961	Succeeded by Bill Hayden
Diplomatic posts
Preceded by John Augustine Collins	Australian High Commissioner to New Zealand; 1962–1965	Succeeded by David McNicol
