= December 1977 Australian Labor Party leadership election =

December 1977 Australian Labor Party Leadership election
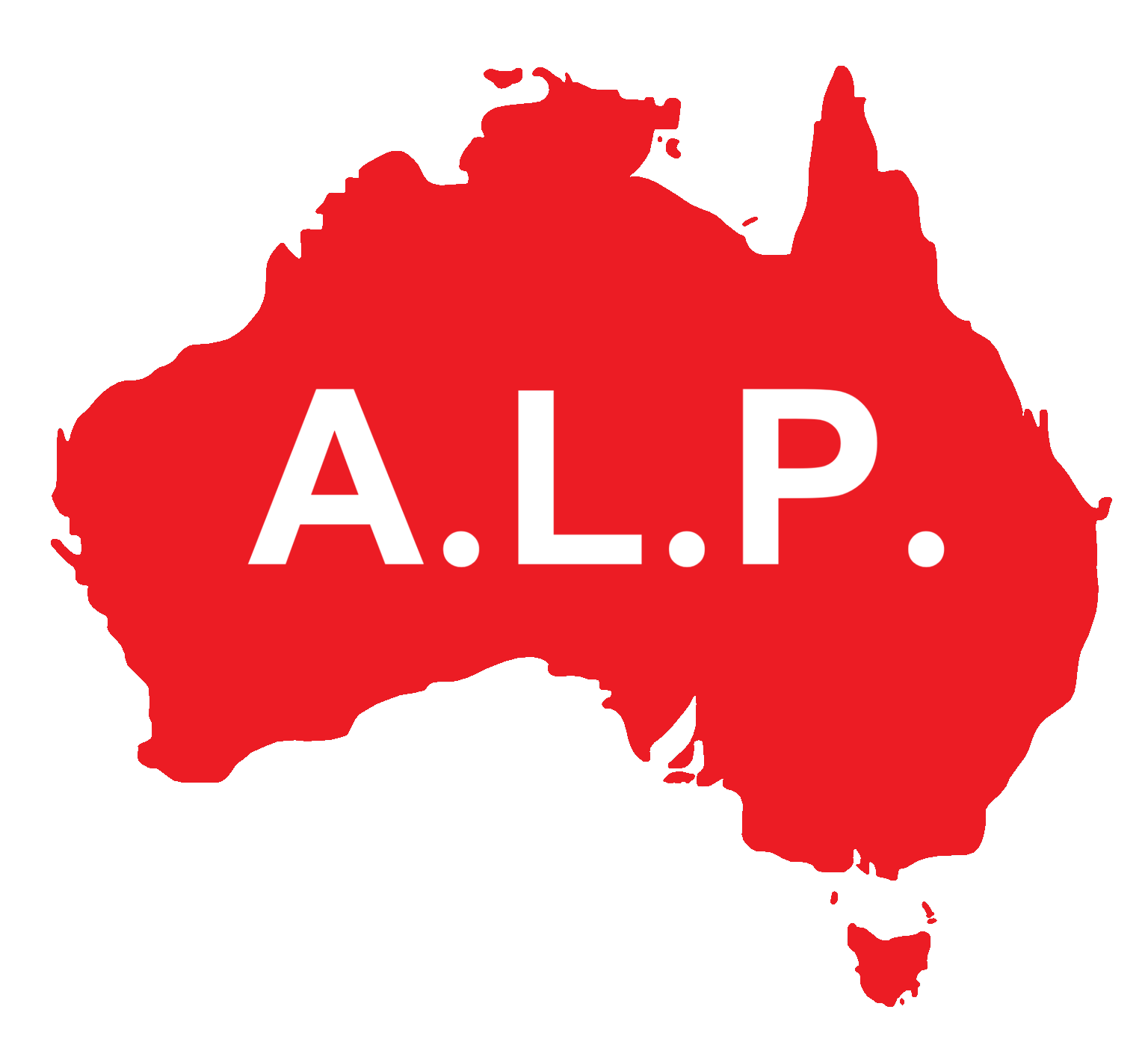
- 22 December 1977
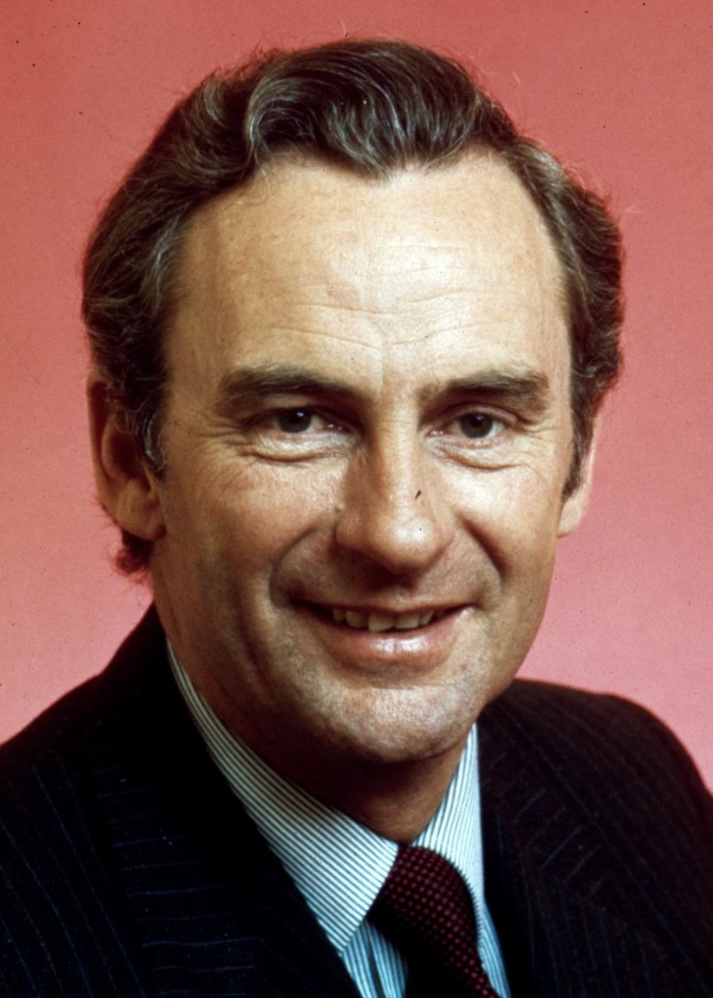

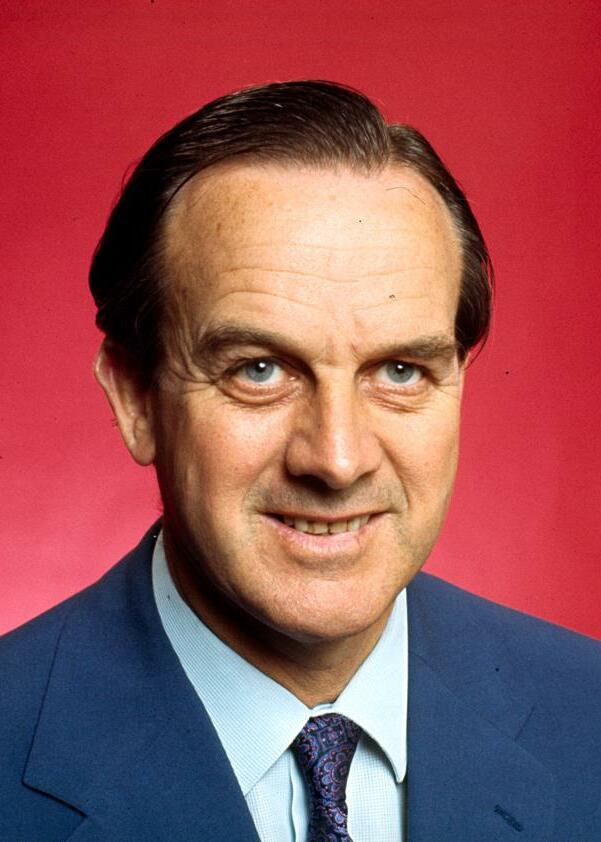
Candidate	Bill Hayden	Lionel Bowen
Caucus vote	36 (56.3%)	28 (43.8%)
Leader before election
Gough Whitlam
Elected Leader
Bill Hayden

A leadership election of the Australian Labor Party (ALP), then the opposition party in the Parliament of Australia, was held on 22 December 1977. Following the resignation of Gough Whitlam former Treasurer Bill Hayden was elected Labor's new leader winning 36 votes to 28 over Lionel Bowen who was then elected deputy leader.

== Background ==
After losing the 1977 election Gough Whitlam finally resigned as party leader after more than 10 years.

Bill Hayden who in May had come within two votes of toppling Whitlam, announced the day after election that he would contest the leadership.

== Candidates ==
- Lionel Bowen, Shadow Attorney-General, Member for Kingsford Smith
- Bill Hayden, Shadow Minister for Economic Management, Member for Oxley

== Results ==
Australian Labor Party Deputy Leadership election, 1977
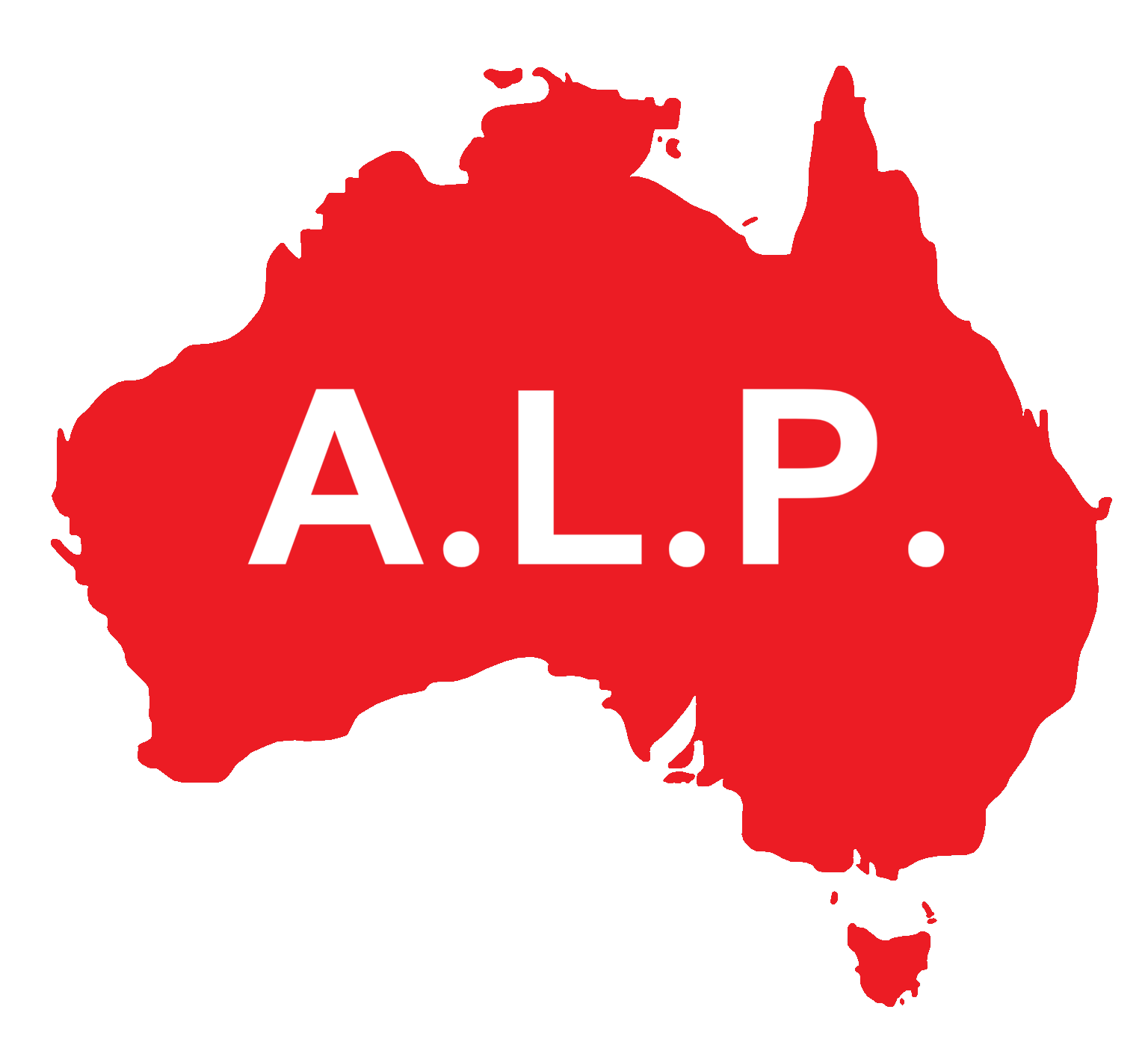

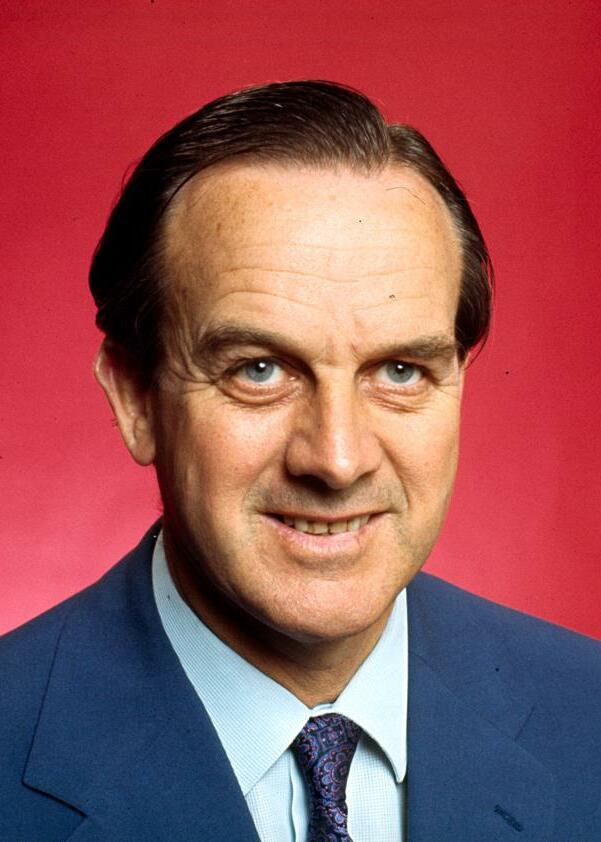

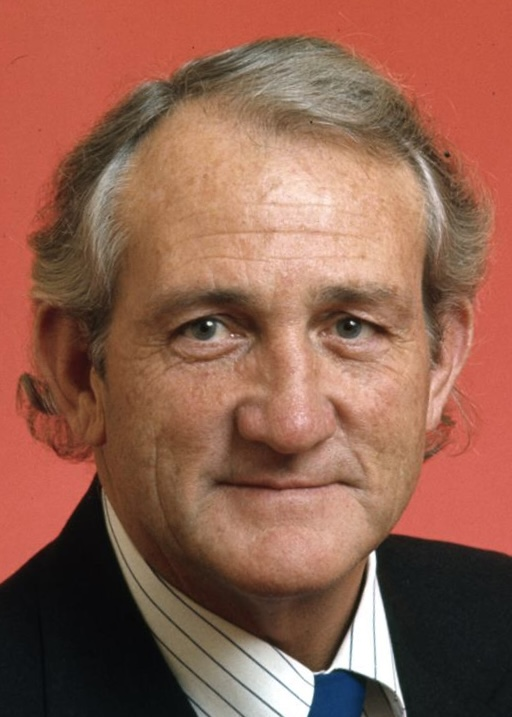

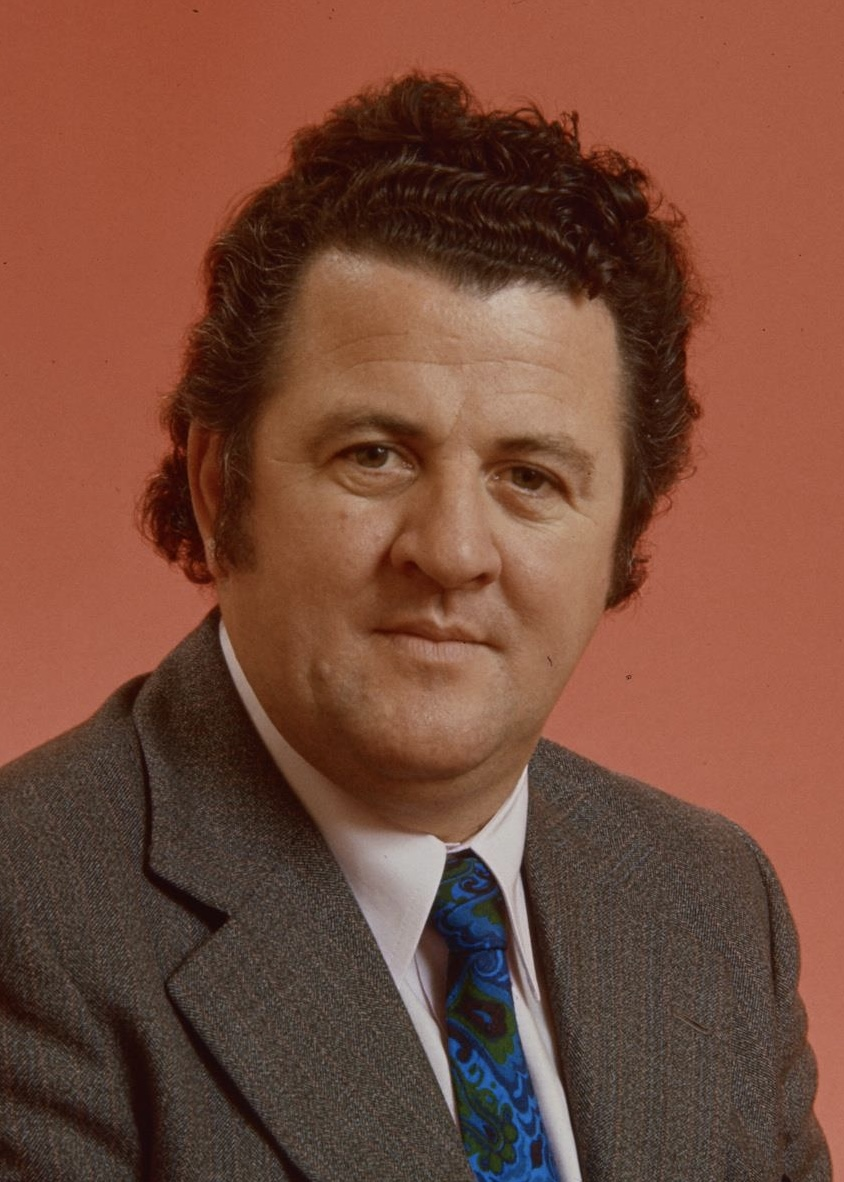

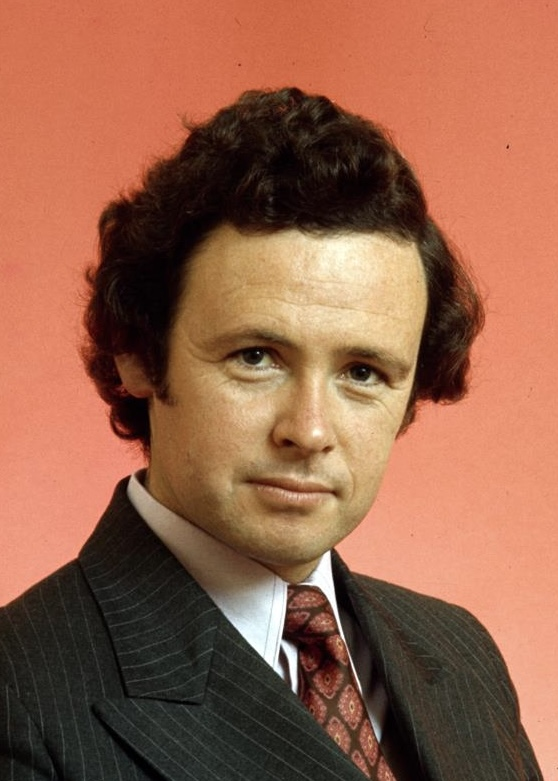
Candidate	Lionel Bowen	Tom Uren
First ballot	25 (39.1%)	22 (34.4%)
Second ballot	26 (40.6%)	26 (40.6%)
Third ballot	33 (51.6%)	29 (45.3%)
Candidate	Mick Young	Ralph Willis
First ballot	10 (15.6%)	7 (10.9%)
Second ballot	11 (17.2%)	Eliminated
Third ballot	Eliminated	Eliminated
Deputy Leader before election
Tom Uren
Deputy Leader
after election
Lionel Bowen

=== Leadership ballot ===
The following tables gives the ballot results:

Name	Votes	Percentage
Bill Hayden	36	56.25
Lionel Bowen	28	43.75

=== Deputy leadership ballot ===
Candidate	1st ballot	2nd ballot	3rd ballot
Lionel Bowen	25	26	33
Tom Uren	22	26	29
Mick Young	10	11	Eliminated
Ralph Willis	7	Eliminated	
Abstentions	0	1	2

Paul Keating had previously announced that he would stand for the deputy leadership, however he stood aside in favour of Bowen.

== Aftermath ==
Hayden led the party in on the 1980 election where they managed to halve Malcolm Fraser's majority.
