= Division of Oxley =

Australian federal electoral division

Coordinates: 27.609°S 152.933°E

Oxley Australian House of Representatives Division
- Interactive map of boundaries since the 2019 federal election
- Created: 1949
- MP: Milton Dick
- Party: Australian Labor Party
- Namesake: John Oxley
- Electors: 122,463 (2025)
- Area: 159 km^{2} (61.4 sq mi)
- Demographic: Outer metropolitan
Electorates around Oxley:
Ryan	Ryan	Moreton
Blair	Oxley	Moreton
Blair	Wright	Rankin

The Division of Oxley is an Australian Electoral Division in Queensland. It is currently represented by Milton Dick, the current Speaker of the House of Representatives, who is a member of the Australian Labor Party (ALP).

== Geography ==
Since 1984, federal electoral division boundaries in Australia have been determined at redistributions by a redistribution committee appointed by the Australian Electoral Commission. Redistributions occur for the boundaries of divisions in a particular state, and they occur every seven years, or sooner if a state's representation entitlement changes or when divisions of a state are malapportioned.

== History ==
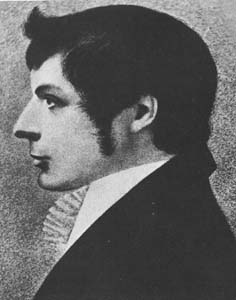
John Oxley, the division's namesake

The current division is the second to bear the name, and was created in 1949. The division is named after the Australian explorer, John Oxley. Oxley is located in south east Queensland, and covers the south western suburbs of Brisbane.

The original Division of Oxley was established in 1901, and was abolished and replaced by the Division of Griffith in 1934. The 1949 incarnation's best-known member was Bill Hayden, the Labor Opposition Leader between 1977 and 1983, when he resigned under pressure the same day that the 1983 election which swept Bob Hawke to power was called. Hayden later served as a minister in the Hawke government before becoming Governor-General in 1989.

In 1996, the seat became most well known for controversial social conservative MP Pauline Hanson who was elected as a Liberal-turned-independent, but the seat was heavily redistributed in 1997, splitting her main support base of Ipswich between Oxley and Blair. In 1998 Hanson contested the seat of Blair, winning 36% of the primary vote but losing to the Liberals (who got 21%) under Australia's system of preferential voting. Hanson's brief tenure represents the only time since 1961 that the seat has been out of Labor hands.

== Members ==
Image	Member	Party	Term	Notes
	Donald Cameron (1900–1974)	Liberal	10 December 1949 – 9 December 1961	Served as minister under Menzies. Lost seat
	Bill Hayden (1933–2023)	Labor	9 December 1961 – 17 August 1988	Served as minister under Whitlam and Hawke. Served as Opposition Leader from 1977 to 1983. Resigned to become Governor-General of Australia
	Les Scott (1947–)	Labor	8 October 1988 – 2 March 1996	Lost seat
	Pauline Hanson (1954–)	Independent	2 March 1996 – 11 April 1997	Originally ran as a Liberal Party candidate, was disendorsed after the ballots were printed. Did not contest in 1998. Failed to win the Division of Blair. Later elected to the Senate in 2016
	Pauline Hanson (1954–)	One Nation	11 April 1997 – 3 October 1998	Originally ran as a Liberal Party candidate, was disendorsed after the ballots were printed. Did not contest in 1998. Failed to win the Division of Blair. Later elected to the Senate in 2016
	Bernie Ripoll (1966–)	Labor	3 October 1998 – 9 May 2016	Retired
	Milton Dick (1972–)	Labor	2 July 2016 – present	Incumbent. Currently the Speaker of the House

== Election results ==
2025 Australian federal election: Oxley
Party	Candidate	Votes	%	±%
Labor	Milton Dick	54,891	52.75	+6.86
Liberal National	Kevin Burns	21,976	21.12	−7.58
Greens	Brandan Holt	13,979	13.43	−0.82
One Nation	Darren Baker	5,738	5.51	−0.33
Family First	William Tento	3,058	2.94	+2.94
Trumpet of Patriots	Mark Maguire	2,985	2.87	+2.87
Unregistered SEP	Mike Head	1,435	1.38	+1.38
Total formal votes		104,062	96.18	−0.20
Informal votes		4,128	3.82	+0.20
Turnout		108,190	88.36	+0.49
Two-party-preferred result
Labor	Milton Dick	72,003	69.19	+7.60
Liberal National	Kevin Burns	32,059	30.81	−7.60
Labor hold		Swing	+7.60	
