= Les Scott =

Australian politician (born 1947)

Member of the Australian Parliament for Oxley
- In office 8 October 1988 – 2 March 1996
- Preceded by: Bill Hayden
- Succeeded by: Pauline Hanson

Personal details
- Born: 18 October 1947 (age 78) Nambour, Queensland, Australia
- Party: Australian Labor Party
- Spouse: Anne Scott

Leslie James Scott (born 18 October 1947) is an Australian politician who was a Labor member of the House of Representatives for the Division of Oxley from 1988 until 1996. He originally won his seat in a 1988 by-election after sitting member and former ALP leader Bill Hayden was promoted from the Foreign Ministry to Governor-General.

Scott was defeated at the 1996 election by controversial independent Pauline Hanson, who had originally been his Liberal opponent before she was disendorsed for making racially offensive remarks that indigenous Australians were given preferential treatment over non-indigenous Australians. Scott only garnered 39 percent on the first count, and ultimately lost on the sixth count with 45 percent of the two-candidate vote to Hanson's 54 percent—a 19.3 percent swing. Even considering Labor's severe defeat in that election and near-meltdown in Queensland in particular (Labor lost all but two seats in Queensland), Scott's defeat was a considerable upset. Going into the election, Oxley had been the safest Labor seat in Queensland, with a 12.6 percent two-party majority. Had Hanson still been running as a Liberal, Scott would have suffered the largest two-party swing of the election.

Scott considered legally challenging Hanson's victory over him, since she was still listed as a Liberal even after her disendorsement. However, this did not eventuate.

While his defeat at the 1996 election marked Scott's political retirement, his wife Anne made an unsuccessful attempt to gain ALP preselection for Oxley for the 1998 election.

Les and Anne are now running Les Scott and Associates, a finance consulting service which they established in 1999.

Parliament of Australia
Preceded by Bill Hayden	Member for Oxley; 1988–1996	Succeeded by Pauline Hanson
