= Bill Hayden =

Australian politician (1933–2023)

The Honourable Bill Hayden AC
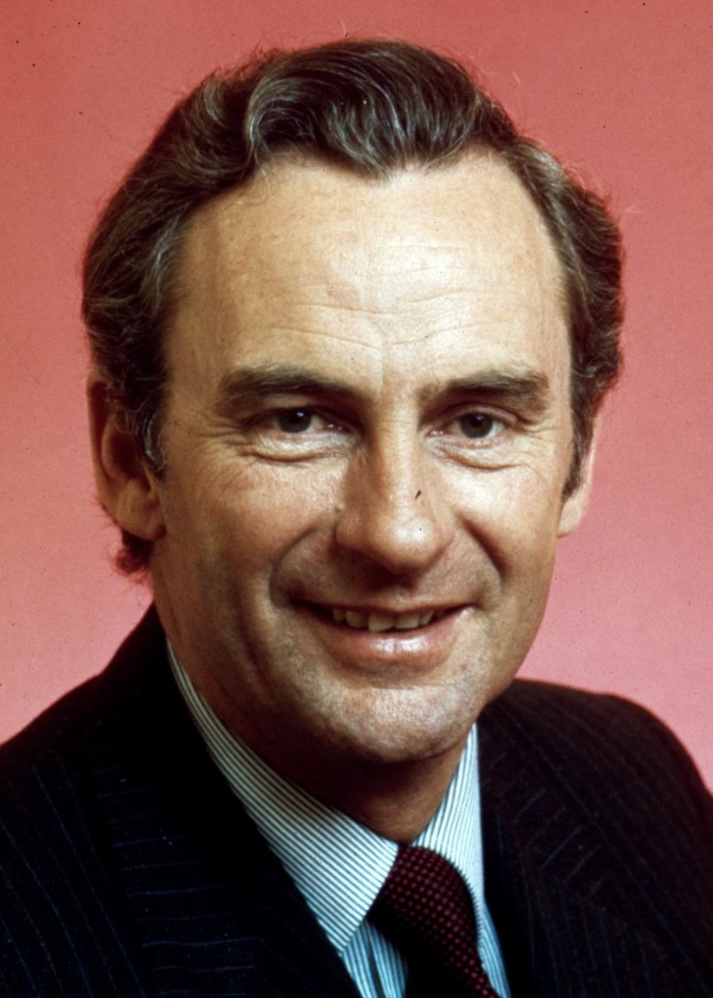
- Official portrait, 1974

21st Governor-General of Australia
- In office 16 February 1989 – 16 February 1996
- Monarch: Elizabeth II
- Prime Minister: Bob Hawke; Paul Keating
- Preceded by: Sir Ninian Stephen
- Succeeded by: Sir William Deane

Leader of the Opposition
- In office 22 December 1977 – 8 February 1983
- Prime Minister: Malcolm Fraser
- Deputy: Lionel Bowen
- Preceded by: Gough Whitlam
- Succeeded by: Bob Hawke

Leader of the Labor Party
- In office 22 December 1977 – 8 February 1983
- Deputy: Lionel Bowen
- Preceded by: Gough Whitlam
- Succeeded by: Bob Hawke

Minister for Foreign Affairs and Trade
- In office 11 March 1983 – 17 August 1988
- Prime Minister: Bob Hawke
- Preceded by: Tony Street
- Succeeded by: Gareth Evans

Treasurer of Australia
- In office 6 June 1975 – 11 November 1975
- Prime Minister: Gough Whitlam
- Preceded by: Jim Cairns
- Succeeded by: Phillip Lynch

Minister for Social Security
- In office 19 December 1972 – 6 June 1975
- Prime Minister: Gough Whitlam
- Preceded by: Lance Barnard
- Succeeded by: John Wheeldon

Member of the Australian Parliament for Oxley
- In office 9 December 1961 – 17 August 1988
- Preceded by: Donald Cameron
- Succeeded by: Les Scott

Personal details
- Born: William George Hayden; 23 January 1933 Spring Hill, Queensland, Australia
- Died: 21 October 2023 (aged 90) Queensland, Australia
- Party: Labor
- Spouse: Dallas Broadfoot (m. 1960)
- Children: 4
- Education: Brisbane State High School
- Alma mater: University of Queensland
- Occupation: Police officer (Queensland Police Service)
- Profession: Politician

William George Hayden (23 January 1933 – 21 October 2023) was an Australian politician who served as the 21st governor-general of Australia from 1989 to 1996. He was Leader of the Labor Party and Leader of the Opposition from 1977 to 1983, and served as Minister for Foreign Affairs and Trade from 1983 to 1988 under Bob Hawke and as Treasurer of Australia in 1975 under Gough Whitlam.

Hayden was born in Brisbane, Queensland. He attended Brisbane State High School and then joined the Queensland Police, working as a police officer for eight years while studying economics part-time at the University of Queensland. Hayden was elected to the House of Representatives at the 1961 federal election, aged 28 – along with Manfred Cross and Doug McClelland, Hayden was the earliest elected Labor MP still alive at the time of his death. When Gough Whitlam led the Labor Party to victory in 1972, Hayden was made Minister for Social Security. He replaced Jim Cairns as treasurer in 1975, but served for only five months before the government was dismissed.

In early 1977, Hayden challenged Whitlam for the party leadership and was defeated by just two votes. He defeated Lionel Bowen to succeed Whitlam as Leader of the Opposition at the end of the year, following Labor's defeat at the 1977 election. Hayden led the party to the 1980 election, recording a substantial swing but falling short of victory. He was replaced by Bob Hawke just a few weeks before the 1983 election, after months of speculation. Hayden served as Minister for Foreign Affairs and Trade from 1983 to 1988, then left parliament to assume the governor-generalship. He held that position for seven years; only Lord Gowrie has served for longer.

== Early life ==
Hayden was born on 23 January 1933 at the Lady Bowen Lying-In Hospital in Spring Hill, Queensland. He was the first child born to Violet Quinn and George Hayden, who married a few weeks after his birth. He had a younger brother and two younger sisters, as well as an older half-brother from his mother's first marriage who was raised by an aunt. His parents both had prior marriages which ended in widowhood.

Hayden's father was an American seaman, probably born in California, who jumped ship in Sydney a few years before World War I. He worked as a piano-tuner and musical instrument salesman, moving to Rockhampton, Queensland, in the early 1920s. He held radical political views and was a member of the Industrial Workers of the World. Hayden's mother was born in Brandon, Queensland, to a working-class family of Irish descent. After the death of her first husband, a shearer, she worked in Rockhampton as a barmaid. The couple moved to Brisbane during the Great Depression.

Hayden spent his first year at a boardinghouse in Fortitude Valley, before the family moved to a rented cottage in the working-class area of Highgate Hill. The family became more financially stable after his father enlisted in the army in 1941. He began his education at St Ita's Catholic Primary School in South Brisbane, but was withdrawn from the school when it rescinded his father's contract to tune the school pianos. He switched to Dutton Park State School and was later highly critical of the quality of education that he received. Hayden went on to South Brisbane Intermediate School, where he passed the state scholarship exam in 1947. This allowed him to complete his secondary education at Brisbane State High School in 1948 and 1949. After leaving school, he found work as a junior clerk in the State Government Stores, where he worked until joining the police. He was conscripted to the Royal Australian Navy for six months following the passage of the National Service Act 1951, having earlier unsuccessfully applied to join the Royal Australian Air Force as an 18-year-old.

== Policing career ==
Hayden joined the Queensland Police Force in 1953 following his father's death. He completed his training in Brisbane and the following year was transferred to Mackay in North Queensland. He was briefly stationed in the small country towns of Calen and Sarina. As he was supporting his mother and younger siblings, he also worked a second full-time job driving a milk truck and various seasonal jobs on rural properties. In 1956, Hayden was transferred back to Brisbane and worked as a plainclothes constable at the Criminal Investigation Branch (CIB). He was later moved to police headquarters on Roma Street where he was rostered on at Government House, guarding the governor of Queensland. He was transferred again in 1957 to the two-man police station at Redbank, on the outskirts of Ipswich.

== Politics (1961–1988) ==
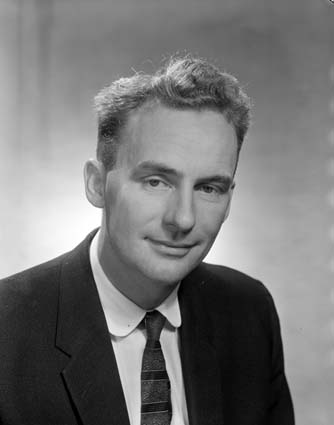
Hayden shortly after his election, in 1962

Hayden held far-left views as a young man and attempted to join the Communist Party of Australia, but was refused membership due to his police ties. He first attempted to join the ALP in South Brisbane in 1953, but was also regarded with suspicion in the context of the ALP split of the mid-1950s. He was ultimately recruited to the Redbank branch of the ALP in 1957. Hayden became "an active and energetic party worker, closely aligned with the left-wing Trades Hall faction that now controlled the Queensland ALP". He became secretary of the electoral executive committee for the state seat of Bremer and president of the divisional executive for the federal seat of Oxley. In 1960 he began attending adult matriculation classes with a view towards attending university. He also attended political science lectures given by Max Poulter at the Brisbane Trades Hall.

In October 1960, Hayden won ALP preselection for the federal seat of Oxley, running as the Trades Hall candidate against Australian Workers' Union (AWU) candidate Bert Warren. At the 1961 federal election he unexpectedly defeated incumbent Liberal MP and cabinet minister Donald Cameron, winning 53 percent of the primary vote on an 11-point swing. Hayden's win was part of a 15-seat swing to Labor that nearly brought down the Menzies government.

Overcoming initial resistance to his membership of the Labor party, Hayden was soon popularly elected as one of the then youngest members of the federal parliament (only 28 years old at the time he entered it). He proved to be a diligent, well-spoken parliamentarian. In 1969, he became a member of the Opposition front bench.

=== Whitlam government (1972–1975) ===
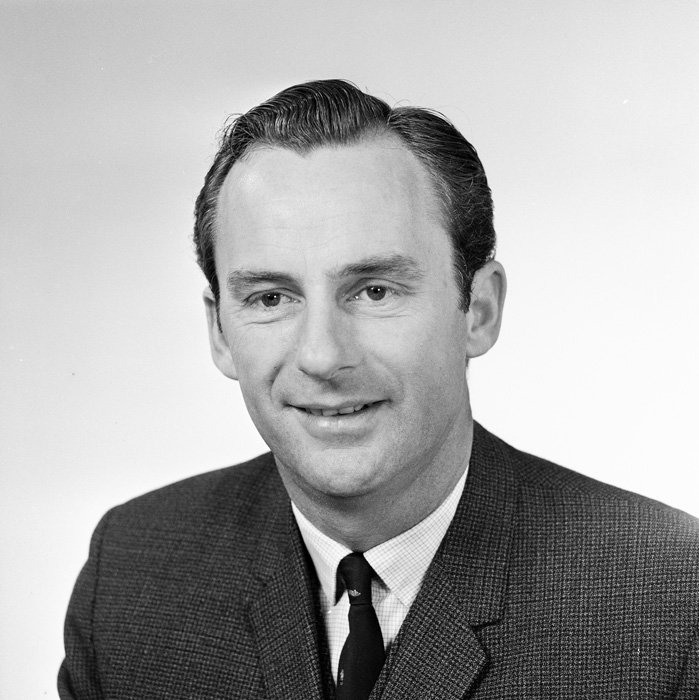
Hayden in 1969

When Labor won the 1972 election under Gough Whitlam, Hayden was appointed Minister for Social Security and, in that capacity among other efforts to promoting reform, introduced the single mothers pension and Medibank, Australia's first system of universal health insurance. On 6 June 1975, he succeeded Jim Cairns as treasurer, a position he held until the Whitlam government was dismissed by the governor-general, Sir John Kerr, on 11 November 1975. Labor suffered its worst-ever defeat in the election held a month later, and Hayden was left as the only Labor MP from Queensland.

=== Opposition leader (1977–1983) ===
When Labor lost the 1977 election in another landslide, Whitlam retired as leader. In the ensuing leadership ballot Hayden was elected over Lionel Bowen to succeed him; Bowen was then elected as Hayden's deputy. Aged almost 45, he was the youngest person to be elected leader of the Labor Party since Chris Watson in 1901. His political views had become more moderate, and he advocated economic policies which encompassed the private sector and the American alliance.

At the 1980 election, Labor finished a mere 0.8 percent behind Fraser's government on the two-party vote, having gained a nationwide swing of over four percent. Yet, due to the geographically uneven nature of the swing (strong in Victoria and, to a lesser degree, Western Australia and New South Wales, but comparatively weak everywhere else), Labor fell 12 seats short of making Hayden prime minister. Hayden did, however, regain much of what Labor had lost in the landslides of 1975 and 1977. He also slashed Fraser's majority in half, from 23 seats to 11.

By 1982, it was evident that Fraser was manoeuvring to call an early election. But the main threat to Hayden came less from Fraser than from elements in Hayden's own party. Bob Hawke, a former union leader who had been elected to Parliament two years earlier, began mobilising his supporters to challenge Hayden's leadership. On 16 July 1982 Hayden narrowly defeated a challenge by Hawke in a party ballot but Hawke continued to plot against Hayden.

In December, Labor surprised many pundits by its failure to win the vital Flinders by-election in Victoria, further raising doubts about Hayden's ability to lead the ALP to power. On 3 February 1983, in a meeting in Brisbane, various leading Labor figures, including Paul Keating and Senator John Button, told Hayden that he must resign. He reluctantly accepted their advice. Hawke was then elected leader on 8 February, unopposed.

Fraser had been well aware of the infighting within Labor and wanted to call an election before the party could replace Hayden with Hawke. He believed that if he put Parliament into "caretaker mode" early enough, Labor would essentially be frozen with Hayden as its leader. On the same morning that Hayden resigned, Fraser asked for, and was granted, an election for 5 March. Unknown to Fraser, however, Hayden resigned two hours before Fraser travelled to Yarralumla. He only learned of Hayden's resignation a few hours before the election writs were issued. At a press conference that afternoon Hayden, still chagrined, said that "a drover's dog could lead the Labor Party to victory, the way the country is". Hayden's quip about a "drover's dog" became part of Australian political history. Hayden himself referred to it good-humouredly many years later when he said, "There are so many things I did in my political life that I am very proud of. ... But the one thing I am remembered for is damn well saying 'A drover's dog could win the next election'. It seems to have settled into political idiom. The only person who didn't like it was Bob Hawke."

=== Foreign minister (1983–1988) ===
Labor won the 1983 election in a rout, handing the Coalition what is still the worst defeat of a sitting non-Labor government since Federation. Hayden became Minister for Foreign Affairs and Trade. In that post, he advocated closer integration between Australia and its Asian neighbours. In a 1983 interview, he stated: "Australia is changing. We're an anomaly as a European country in this part of the world. There's already a large and growing Asian population in Australia and it is inevitable in my view that Australia will become an Eurasian country over the next century or two. Australian Asians and Europeans will marry another and a new race will emerge: I happen to think that's desirable."

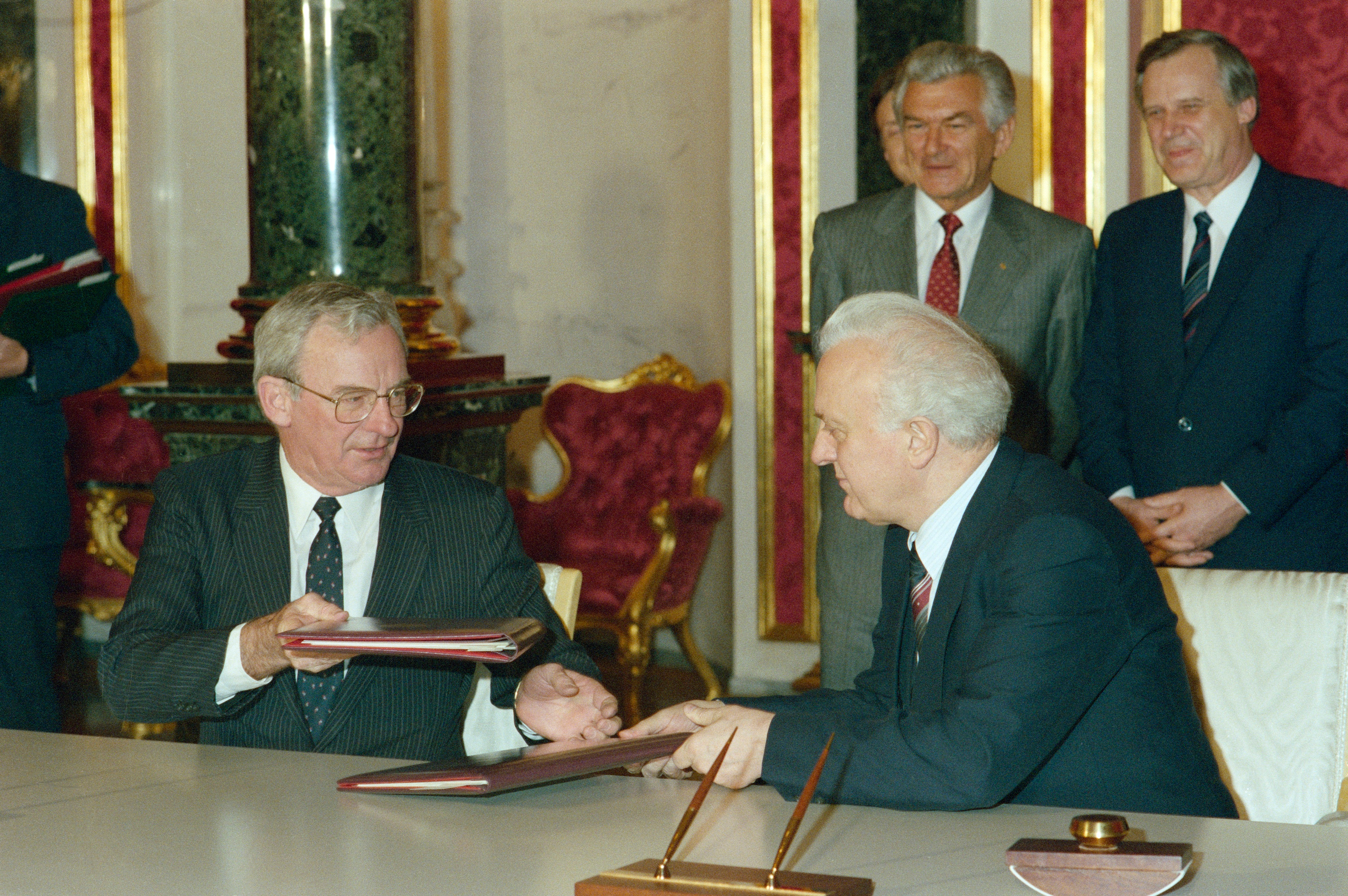
Hayden in 1987, signing an agreement with Soviet Foreign Minister Eduard Shevardnadze (right).

As Foreign Minister, Hayden had oversight of the Australian foreign aid program. He pursued efforts to engage Vietnam and Cambodia despite vehement opposition from allied nations and key stakeholders. In 1983, Hayden announced a review of the Australian foreign aid program (known as the "Jackson Review" after the chair, Sir Gordon Jackson), which reported in March 1984. The main recommendations of the report, which were directed at improving the professional quality of the Australian aid program, were accepted by the Government. During the next few years, in various speeches, Hayden set out the foreign aid priorities of the government.

== Governor-general (1989–1996) ==
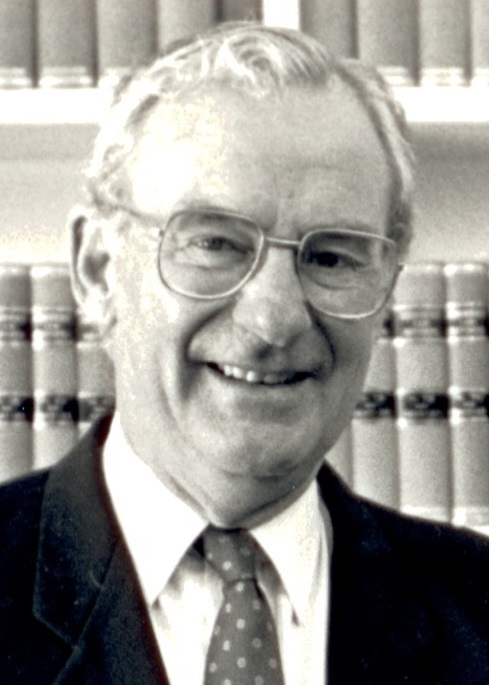
Hayden as governor-general in 1990

After winning the 1987 election, Prime Minister Hawke announced that Queen Elizabeth II, as Queen of Australia, had approved of Hayden's appointment as Governor-General of Australia. This was widely viewed as a consolation on Hawke's part for replacing Hayden earlier as Labor Leader in 1983 and thus denying him the chance to become prime minister. The Queen's appointment of Hayden as governor-general to succeed Sir Ninian Stephen was announced in mid-1988. On 17 August, Hayden resigned from Parliament, becoming the last MP to leave Parliament before the recently opened new Parliament House began sitting the following week. He also severed his political connections with the Labor Party. He took up the post of governor-general in early 1989 and served during the period of transition from the Hawke government to the Keating government in December 1991. The usual term served by a governor-general was five years but, by agreement between the government and Hayden, his term was extended for an additional two years to early 1996.

Upon his appointment as governor-general, he became, ex officio, Chancellor and Principal Companion of the Order of Australia.

Other governors-general had been appointed by the Scout Association as its Chief Scout of Australia but Hayden declined because he was an atheist, which was incompatible with the Scout Promise. Instead, the Scout Association of Australia appointed him as its national patron.

== Later life ==
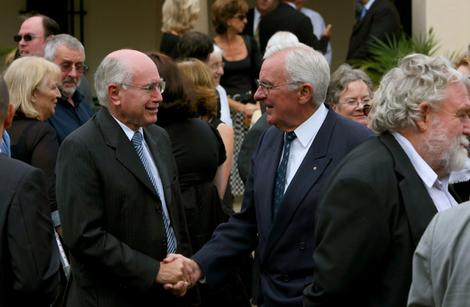
Hayden and John Howard at Padraic McGuinness's funeral in 2008

By the late 1990s, Hayden joined the board of Quadrant. In the debate preceding the 1999 republic referendum, he rejected the specific proposal and sided with the monarchists, stating he supported the direct election of a president.

After retiring as governor-general, Hayden continued to contribute to public policy discussion in Australia. While on the board of Quadrant, he took time to lend personal support to the publication and wrote a tribute to its editor Padraic McGuinness on his death in 2008. He also continued to write opinion and comment pieces for other magazines and newspapers in Australia about current social, economic and political issues including foreign affairs.

== Personal life ==
In May 1960, Hayden married Dallas Broadfoot (born 28 September 1936), the daughter of a miner from Ipswich. They initially lived in a rented cottage in Dinmore before building a house in Ipswich's western suburbs. The couple had three daughters and a son. Their first daughter, Michaela, died in 1966 at the age of five after being struck by a car.

In September 2018, Hayden was baptised in the Roman Catholic Church at St Mary's Church, Ipswich. He told The Catholic Leader that "there's been a gnawing pain in my heart and soul about what is the meaning of life". The baptismal ceremony was attended by a gathering of family, friends and former colleagues. Hayden's siblings, Patricia Oxenham, John Hayden and Joan Moseman, along with other family members, were present.

=== Death ===
Hayden died in Queensland on 21 October 2023, after a long illness at the age of 90; nine years to the day after Gough Whitlam's death. His death was commemorated by Prime Minister Anthony Albanese, who announced Hayden would be honoured with a state funeral.

Hayden's wife, Dallas, a Member of the Order of Australia, died on 15 January 2024, less than three months after her husband.

== Honours ==
By virtue of being governor-general, Hayden was the Chancellor of the Order of Australia and its Principal Companion (AC). In 1999, Latvia awarded him the Order of the Three Stars 3rd Class.

Hayden received an Honorary Doctorate of Laws from the University of Queensland in 1990 for his distinguished contributions to Australian life. Other awards included admission to the Order of St John Australia and also the Gwanghwa Medal of the Korean Order of Diplomatic Merit.

In 1996, Hayden was recognised as the Australian Humanist of the Year by the Council of Australian Humanist Societies. In 2007 at the 45th State Conference of the Queensland Branch of the Australian Labor Party, Hayden was made a Life Member of the party.

In September 2017, in delivering the second Hayden Oration at the University of Southern Queensland in Ipswich, former Australian prime minister Paul Keating spoke at length of Hayden's contribution to the Labor Party. Keating spoke, in particular, of the reform period during the Hawke Labor government in the 1980s in Australia. He noted that the foundations for the reforms had been set down before the Labor Party won office in 1983 during the period when Hayden was Leader of the Opposition and was working to prepare the party for government. "Those great reforms", Keating said, "began with the frameworks Bill Hayden brought to the front bench, the day he became Leader of the Labor Party."

== Hayden Oration ==
The annual Hayden Oration, sponsored by the Queensland Labor politician Jennifer Howard, was established in 2016 to honour Bill Hayden. Lectures held in the series include the following:

- 2016 First Oration, David Hamill, 14 August
- 2017 Second Oration, Paul Keating, 29 September
- 2018 Third Oration, Neal Blewett, 15 August
- 2019 Fourth Oration, Susan Ryan, 6 September
- 2020–2022 not held
- 2023 Fifth Oration, Jim Chalmers, 10 November

Parliament of Australia
Preceded by Donald Cameron	Member for Oxley; 1961–1988	Succeeded by Les Scott
Political offices
Preceded by Lance Barnard as Minister for Social Services	Minister for Social Security; 1972–1975	Succeeded by John Wheeldon
Preceded by Jim Cairns	Treasurer of Australia; 1975	Succeeded by Phillip Lynch
Preceded by Kim Beazley Sr. as Opposition Spokesperson on Education and Defence	Opposition Spokesperson on Defence; 1976–1977	Succeeded by Himself as Opposition Spokesperson on Defence and Economic Management
Preceded by Himself as Opposition Spokesperson on Defence	Opposition Spokesperson on Defence and Economic Management; 1977	Succeeded by Gordon Scholes as Opposition Spokesperson on Defence
Preceded by Gough Whitlam	Leader of the Opposition of Australia; 1977–1983	Succeeded by Bob Hawke
Preceded by Lionel Bowen	Opposition Spokesperson on Foreign Affairs; 1983	Succeeded by Michael MacKellar as Shadow Minister for Foreign Affairs
Preceded by Tony Street	Minister for Foreign Affairs; 1983–1987	Succeeded by Himself as Minister for Foreign Affairs and Trade
Preceded by Himself as Minister for Foreign Affairs	Minister for Foreign Affairs and Trade; 1987–1988	Succeeded by Gareth Evans
Party political offices
Preceded by Gough Whitlam	Leader of the Australian Labor Party; 1977–1983	Succeeded by Bob Hawke
Government offices
Preceded by Sir Ninian Stephen	Governor-General of Australia; 1989–1996	Succeeded by Sir William Deane
