= October 1971 =

Month of 1971

<<	October 1971					>>
Su	Mo	Tu	We	Th	Fr	Sa
					1	2
3	4	5	6	7	8	9
10	11	12	13	14	15	16
17	18	19	20	21	22	23
24	25	26	27	28	29	30
31

October 25, 1971: United Nations votes 76 to 35...

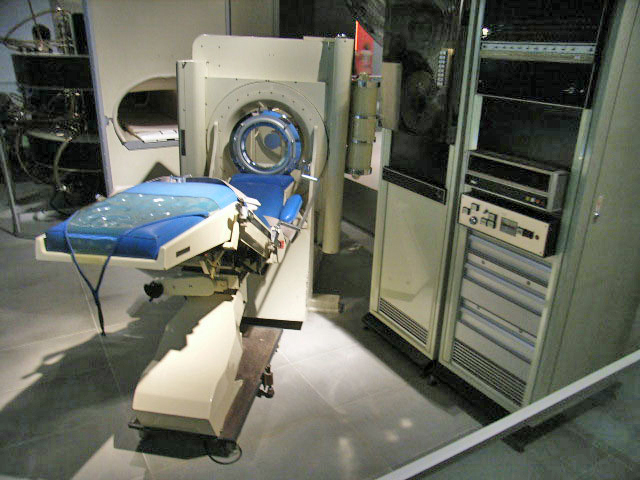
October 1, 1971: CAT Scan performed for the first time on a human patient

...to admit Communist China as a member...

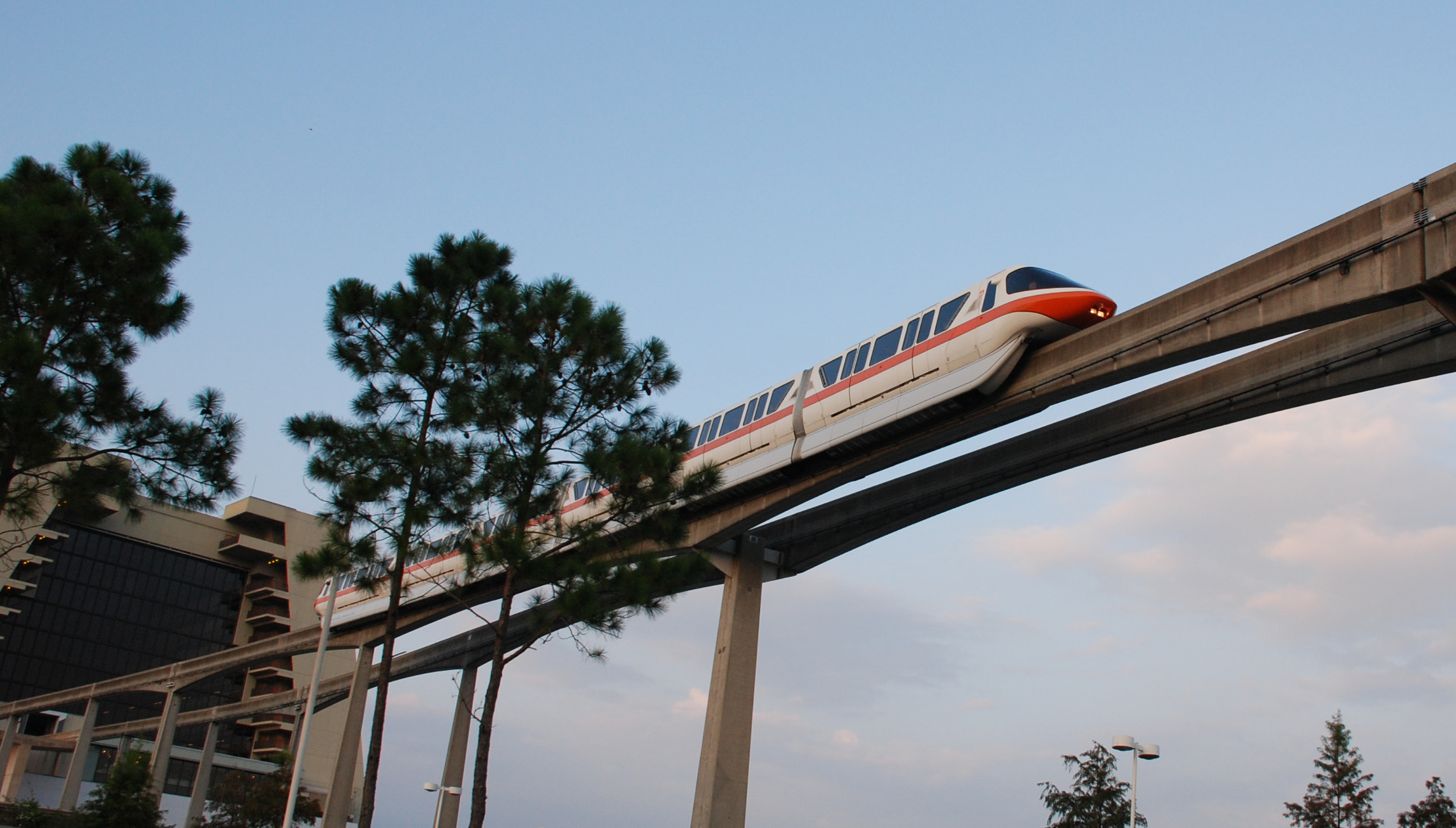
October 1, 1971: Walt Disney World opens near Orlando, Florida

...and expels Republic of China (Taiwan)

The following events occurred in October 1971:

== October 1, 1971 (Friday) ==
- The first CAT scan on a human being (now referred to as a CT scan) was performed, conducted outside of London in Wimbledon at the Atkinson Morley Hospital on an unidentified patient, using computerized axial tomography on a machine developed by Dr. Godfrey Hounsfield from the theories of Dr. Allan Cormack.
- Walt Disney World opened at 10:00 in the morning near Orlando, Florida. Roughly 2,000 people were waiting when the gates opened to the eastern U.S. counterpart to Disneyland, which had opened in 1955 in Anaheim, California. On the first day, only 10,000 paying customers showed up rather than the predicted 30,000.
- For the first time since the October 1, 1949, Chinese Revolution, the traditional massive parades through Beijing for the National Day of the People's Republic of China were canceled, and celebrations were minimal, with no explanation for the cancellation of scheduled events. Although a giant portrait of Chinese Communist Party Chairman Mao Zedong was put on display in Tiananmen Square, the official Party newspaper, Jenmin Jin Pao, made no editorial comment and omitted any photos of both Mao and Deputy Party Chairman Lin Biao. Unbeknownst to the general public, the Party and the government had been in turmoil since August after an attempted overthrow of Chairman Mao by Vice Chairman Lin.
- As part of a program of "regional reform" (Gebietsreform) in West Germany's state of Hessen, mergers of several villages went into effect. Niederwalluf and Oberwalluf were combined as Walluf; Neuenhasslau and Gondsroth were united as Hasselroth; Eibelshausen, Eiershausen and Wissenbach merged to form Eschenburg; Bleidenstadt, Hahn, Neuhof, Seitzenhahn, Watzhahn and Wehen formed Taunusstein; and the municipalities of Dauborn, Heringen, Kirberg, Mensfelden, Nauheim, Neesbach and Ohren were amalgamated as Hünfelden. In the first phase of encouraging voluntary mergers, the number of municipalities went from 2,642 to 1,233. Mandatory consolidation to reduce the number to 500 would take place in 1974.
- Died: Senior Lieutenant Maguba Guseynovna Syrtlanova, 69, Soviet pilot and Heroine of the Soviet Union as deputy commander of the all-female 588th Night Bomber Regiment of the Soviet Air Force, nicknamed "die Nachthexen" ("The Night Witches") by the Germans.

== October 2, 1971 (Saturday) ==
- All 63 people on board British European Airways Flight 706 were killed when the Vickers Vanguard turboprop suffered an explosive decompression at an altitude of 19,000 feet (5,800 m) while flying over Belgium. Flight 706 had taken off from London 35 minutes earlier, bound for Salzburg in Austria. The explosion of an engine caused the Vanguard to plummet, and the plane crashed on a pasture near Ghent in a field beside a road between the towns of Tielt and Deinze.
- Soul Train, created by Don Cornelius as a showcase for African-American bands, and similar to American Bandstand with a studio of teenagers dancing to the music, began as a syndicated program with weekly episodes. Originally a weekday afternoon program on Chicago's WCIU-TV channel 26, Soul Train picked up the sponsorship of the Johnson Products Company and began airing on seven U.S. TV stations, increasing to 18 by the end of its first season. The guests on the first show were Gladys Knight and the Pips, Honey Cone, Bobby Hutton and Eddie Kendricks.
- The Soviet lunar probe Luna 19 went into orbit around the Moon and began collecting and transmitting data for more than a year, before ceasing communications on November 1, 1972.
- South Vietnam's President Nguyen Van Thieu was re-elected unopposed after both of his challengers— Nguyen Cao Ky and Duong Van Minh— had dropped out of the race because of government interference.
- British Rail re-inaugurated steam locomotive passenger train service on the UK's major railroads by permitting the former Great Western Railway No. 6000 King George V to operate on a series of special trains.
- The Bible Broadcasting Network, a U.S.-based Christian radio network, began its first broadcast, signing on at 5:00 in the afternoon on station WYFI in Norfolk, Virginia. The network now is carried on 52 stations in the U.S.
- For the first time in the history of American football, a "one-point safety" was scored in a game. Differing from the more common 2-point safety, the awarding of one point to one's opponent is reserved for infractions committed by the team opposing a point after touchdown kick, and happened in Syracuse University's 7 to 0 win over host Indiana University, when IU's Mike Heizman tipped an extra point try by George Bodine of Syracuse, and Syracuse center Greg Aulk fell on the ball in the end zone.
- U.S. Representative Richard H. Poff of Virginia abruptly withdrew his name from consideration as U.S. Supreme Court justice, four hours after an American Bar Association committee met to survey the opinion of other lawyers about whether Poff was qualified. Poff, who had not formally been nominated, had reportedly been President Nixon's first choice to fill the seat recently vacated by Justice Hugo Black.
- Born: Tiffany (stage name for Tiffany Renee Darwish), American teenage music icon who successfully promoted her record album into a number one bestseller by her tour of free concerts at U.S. shopping malls in 1987; in Norwalk, California
- Died:
  - Dr. Marie Lebour, 95, British marine biologist with a career spanning 64 years. Among 28 species she discovered were Meiosquilla lebouri, Cercaria lebouri and Lepidodiscus lebouri.
  - U.S. Navy Admiral Richard H. Jackson, 105, former commander-in-chief of the Battle Fleet, died of cardiac failure, 10 days after fracturing a hip.
  - Otto Lucas, 68, German-born British milliner who designed fashionable hats for celebrities, was killed in the crash of BEA Flight 706.

== October 3, 1971 (Sunday) ==
- François Cevert of France won the United States Grand Prix, his only Formula One Grand Prix season victory. Jackie Stewart of Scotland, who had already clinched more points than any of his opponents in six races than by his closest competitor (Ronnie Peterson of Sweden) would have for the entire 11-race schedule, had already clinched the championship by August 1.
- Died:
  - Seán Ó Riada (John Reidy), Irish musician and composer, 40, died of cirrhosis of the liver.
  - John Glaister Jr., 79, British forensic scientist
  - Archduchess Adelheid of Austria, 57, the first of the eight children of Emperor Charles of Austria-Hungary to die

== October 4, 1971 (Monday) ==
- Researchers at the Yunnan Institute of Pharmacology in China made a breakthrough in the treatment of malaria based on Traditional Chinese Medicine and synthesis of the extract of qinghao from the artemisia annua plant, as described by an ancient physician, Ge Hong, in the 4th Century. Dr. Tu Youyou and her team of researchers discovered on October 4 that the compound they produced, artemisinin, could successfully cure common strains of malarial fever in monkeys and mice, and moved to human testing that proved equally effective in August 1972. For her discovery, Dr. Tu would be the co-recipient of the 2015 Nobel Prize in Physiology or Medicine.
- Egypt's President Anwar Sadat was chosen as the first President of the Federation of Arab Republics, by agreement of the three-member Presidential Council that consisted of Sadat, Libya's President Muammar Gaddafi and Syria's Hafez al-Assad.
- Petroleum was found under Sable Island, off the coast of the Nova Scotia province in Canada.
- In an unusual hijacking incident that cost the lives of three people because of the negligence of an FBI agent, a real estate agent in Nashville kidnapped his wife at gunpoint, leased a twin-engine aircraft claiming to be a physician who was taking her for medical treatment in Miami, then forced the two-member crew to fly him to the Bahamas. George M. Giffe Jr. killed his wife Susan, and pilot Brent Quinton Downs, after Downs landed the plane in Jacksonville, then killed himself, after FBI agents grounded the plane by shooting out the tires and an engine. The event remains a cautionary tale of poor handling of hostage negotiating. In 1975, a federal court judgment of $388,530 would be entered against the FBI and special agent James O' Connor on behalf of the estates of Mrs. Giffe and Mr. Downs, and for the Big Brother Aircraft, Inc., the owner of the airplane.
- Died:
  - Alberto Fermín Zubiría, 69, nominal head of state of Uruguay from March 1, 1956, to March 1, 1957, as president of the nine-member National Council of Government of Uruguay, the nominal head of a state in a nine-member executive council where the position of chairman rotated among the members for one year terms. Fermín served the term lasting from 1 March 1956 to 1 March 1957.
  - John Carroll, 80, Australian war hero and Victoria Cross recipient for his bravery during the June 1917 Battle of Messines during World War One "
  - U.S. Army Major General Norman Cota, 78, known for rallying troops during the D-Day assault on Omaha Beach in Normandy during World War Two.

== October 5, 1971 (Tuesday) ==
- A meteorite fell in Brazil within the city limits of Marília in São Paulo state, breaking into at least seven fragments that totaled 2.5 kilograms (5.5 lb), the largest of which weighed 780 grams (28 oz). According to the coordinates listed on the Mindat.org site (-22.25000,-49.93333), the fragments of the H4 iron chondrite stone landed at what is now the Parque São Jorge section of Marília, near the intersection of R. Eduardo Prado and Avenida João Ramalho.
- The Baltimore Orioles won the championship of baseball's American League in a three-game sweep of a best-3-of-5 series, defeating Oakland A's, 5 to 3, to advance to the World Series.
- In one of only two exhibition game matchups between the reigning champions of the National Basketball Association (NBA) and the rival American Basketball Association (ABA), the NBA's Milwaukee Bucks defeated the ABA's Utah Stars, 122 to 114, at Salt Lake City before 12,653 fans. Kareem Abdul-Jabbar scored 36 points and Oscar Robertson 24 to lead the Bucks, while the high scorers for Utah were Willie Wise (33 points), Zelmo Beaty (29) and Glen Combs (26).
- Died:
  - Giuseppe Fiocco, 86, Italian art historian.
  - Sir Peregrine Henniker-Heaton, 68, British intelligence officer for the MI-6 agency and the 3rd Baronet Henniker-Heaton, committed suicide after going for a morning stroll, then locking himself inside his study in his home in the London suburb of Ealing. His body would not be found until almost three years later, on June 23, 1974.

== October 6, 1971 (Wednesday) ==
- Operation Jefferson Glenn, the last major combat engagement in the Vietnam War by U.S. forces, ended after 33 days.
- James G. Fulton, 68, U.S. Representative for Pennsylvania since 1945, died of a heart attack two days after he had been admitted to Walter Reed Medical Center for a checkup.

== October 7, 1971 (Thursday) ==
- The British Museum loaned the "Cyrus Cylinder" to Iran for 16 days during the Iranian celebration of the 2,500th anniversary of the founding of the Persian Empire. The ancient clay cylinder, inscribed in cuneiform script and written in the Akkadian language, had been written in 539 BC as a proclamation in the name of Persia's King Cyrus the Great, founder of the Persian Empire, following his conquest of Babylonia. The cylinder was rediscovered in 1879 by archaeologists excavating the site of Babylon (near the current site of the city of Hillah in Iraq) rather than in Iran itself.
- Polygamy became illegal in Hong Kong as the Marriage Reform Ordinance 1970 went into effect, superseding the Great Qing Legal Code that had been implemented during the Manchu dynasty in 1644 and had continued by British colonial authorities in the administration of Hong Kong.
- Vittorio Emanuele, Prince of Naples, the last Crown Prince of Italy as the eldest son of the last King, Umberto II, married Swiss water skier Marina Doria while the two were in Iran as the invited guests of the Shah for the 2,500th anniversary celebration of the Persian Empire.
- Died: K. Kelappan (Koyapalli Kelappan Nair), 82, Indian civil rights activist

== October 8, 1971 (Friday) ==
- The government of Canada, led by Prime Minister Pierre Trudeau, adopted the policy of "multiculturalism within a bilingual framework". Trudeau addressed the House of Commons in Ottawa and said that "Although there are two official languages, there is no official culture, nor does any ethnic group take precedence over any other."
- The Soviet Union expelled five British foreign diplomats and prohibited 13 others from returning, as a retaliation for the September expulsion from the UK of 90 Soviet officials.
- Chinese Communist Party Chairman Mao Zedong appeared in public for the first time in more than two months, along with Prime Minister Zhou Enlai, but Vice Chairman Lin Biao, who had not been seen since June and not mentioned in the press since August, did not appear for Mao's official greeting of Ethiopia's Emperor Haile Selassie.

== October 9, 1971 (Saturday) ==
- An attempted coup d'etat by a unit of the Argentine Army failed after less than a day when the rebels received no support from the rest of the military in their attempt to overthrow President Alejandro Lanusse. The coup plotters seized a radio station in Buenos Aires and the cities of Azul and Olavarría all of which were recaptured by the Argentine Army. Colonel Manuel Alejandro Garcia, leader of the rebels, surrendered to General Joaquin Aguilar Pinedo after government troops re-entered Azul. No shots were fired during the coup attempt.
- In Vietnam, an American prisoner of war was freed by the Communist Viet Cong after more than two years as a POW. U.S. Army Staff Sergeant John C. Sexton Jr., who was captured on August 12, 1969, was released at Loc Ninh, was only the 23rd American prisoner to be released by the Viet Cong since the Vietnam War had started.

== October 10, 1971 (Sunday) ==
- The classic British TV drama series Upstairs, Downstairs was shown for the first time, premiering on ITV.
- All 25 people aboard Aeroflot Flight 773 were killed when a bomb exploded onboard seconds after the Tu-104B jet took off from Moscow's Vnukovo International Airport on a flight to Simferopol in the Ukrainian SSR.
- Nine members of the dance troupe of the Colon Theater Ballet of Argentina were killed in a plane crash shortly after takeoff from Buenos Aires en route to Bahia Blanca. The air taxi plunged into the Río de la Plata estuary after one of the engines failed.
- Elections were held in Austria for the 183 seats of the Nationalrat and Chancellor Bruno Kreisky's Social Democratic Party (SPÖ) won an absolute majority for the first time in its history, winning 93 seats.
- The former London Bridge, transported in pieces from England and rebuilt in the United States, reopened in Lake Havasu City, Arizona.
- Born: Evgeny Kissin, Russian pianist, in Moscow
- Died: Norma Fontenla, 41, and José Neglia, 42, Argentine ballet partners, were killed, along with seven other members of the Teatro Colón troupe when the plane they were on crashed shortly after takeoff from Buenos Aires.

== October 11, 1971 (Monday) ==
- Salyut 1, the first crewed space station in human history, burned up upon re-entry into the Earth's atmosphere, slightly less than six months after its original launch, as the mission was terminated by the Soviet Union space program.
- The University of Wisconsin System, composed of the 13 state universities of the U.S. state of Wisconsin, was created by the merger of the nine members of the Wisconsin State Universities (at Eau Claire, La Crosse, Oshkosh, Platteville, River Falls, Stout (in Menomonie), Superior, Stevens Point, and Whitewater), the University of Wisconsin (at Madison) and UW's partner Wisconsin State College-Milwaukee.
- "Imagine", the most popular of John Lennon's songs after the breakup of The Beatles, was released as a single in the United States.
- Born: Justin Lin, Taiwanese-born American film director known for The Fast and the Furious: Tokyo Drift and Star Trek Beyond; as Lin Yi-bin in Taipei
- Died:
  - Chester Conklin, 85, American comedian and silent film star
  - Rudolf Wittkower, 70, German-born British art historian
  - Nardong Putik (Leonardo Manicio), 46, Filipino gangster, was killed in a shootout with Philippine police

== October 12, 1971 (Tuesday) ==
- In the middle of Pakistan's war with Bangladeshi separatists in East Pakistan the President, General Yahya Khan, announced that he would convene a new National Assembly with elections to fill all of the seats vacated by Awami League members. On December 7, 1970, the Awami League had won 167 of the 169 seats reserved by the government (based in West Pakistan) for the more populous East Pakistan, then declared the results invalid rather than to convene a parliament where a majority of the 313 seats were controlled by the other half of the geographically divided nation. Subsequently, Yahya's government declared 78 of the 167 seats vacant because the candidates elected to them "had committed crimes against the state".
- After originally being executed as a studio recording of a rock music album almost a year earlier, Jesus Christ Superstar was performed for the first time before a theater audience, opening on Broadway at the Mark Hellinger Theatre (which, appropriately, would later become the interdenominational Times Square Church).
- The four-day 2,500-year celebration of the Persian Empire began as the reigning monarch of Iran, Mohammad Reza Pahlavi paid homage to the founder of the Persian Empire at the Tomb of King Cyrus The Great. The tomb, built at the ruins of Pasargadae, the first capital of the Achaemenid Empire, near the modern village of Mobarakabad in Iran. The celebration then moved to the elaborate "tent city" set up at the ruins (near Shiraz) of the second capital at Persepolis.
- Charles "Tex" Watson, who had carried out most of the actual homicides in the Tate—LaBianca murders of August 8, 1969, at the direction of Charles Manson, was convicted of seven counts of first degree murder by a jury in Los Angeles.
- The U.S. House of Representatives overwhelmingly approved the proposed Equal Rights Amendment (ERA) as a 27th amendment to the U.S. Constitution, 354 to 23, and the legislation moved on to the U.S. Senate.
- Jaafar Nimeiry was sworn in as the first freely-elected President of Sudan after two years as the National Revolutionary Command Council.
- Born: Russian Army Lieutenant Colonel Oleg Novitsky, Russian cosmonaut on two separate missions to the International Space Station, 2012-2013 and 2016–2017 with 11 months in orbit; in Chervyen, Byelorussian SSR, Soviet Union
- Died:
  - Dean Acheson, 78, U.S. Secretary of State from 1949 to 1953 for President Harry Truman
  - Gene Vincent (Vincent Eugene Craddock), 36, American singer and Rock and Roll Hall of Fame inductee, died of a ruptured stomach ulcer at a hospital in Newhall, California, after taking ill while visiting his father in the town of Saugus.

== October 13, 1971 (Wednesday) ==
- For the first time since baseball's World Series had been inaugurated in 1903, one of the best-4-of-seven games was scheduled at night rather than in the afternoon, so that it could be seen in the evening across the United States. While the first three games of the 1971 World Series between the Baltimore Orioles and the Pittsburgh Pirates had started at 1:00 in the afternoon Eastern time (10:00 in the morning Pacific time), Game 4 began at 8:15 in the evening for telecast by the NBC network. Pittsburgh won, 4 to 3, to even the series at two wins for both teams. The remaining three games took place in the afternoon.
- Born:
  - Sacha Baron Cohen, British comedian known for the "Borat" series of films; in Hammersmith, London
  - Luis Tosar, Spanish stage, film and TV actor; in Lugo, Galicia

== October 14, 1971 (Thursday) ==
- The Hague Hijacking Convention (officially, the Convention for the Suppression of Unlawful Seizure of Aircraft), signed in the Netherlands on December 16, 1970, went into effect after being ratified by 10 of the 75 signatory nations.
- The 15-member Politburo of the Communist Party of the Soviet Union approved the 1971-1975 Five-Year Plan for the economy of the Soviet Union after the goals of the April meeting of the Congress of the CPSU had concluded that the goals of the previous Five-Year plan had not been fulfilled and that the Soviet economy was facing stagnation of its growth for the first time in the history of the USSR.
- Died: Abdul Monem Khan, 72, the longest-serving governor of East Pakistan (1962 to 1969) before the province separated from the rest of Pakistan to form the nation of Bangladesh, died the day after he was shot by a Bangladesh nationalist.

== October 15, 1971 (Friday) ==
- The 2,500 Year Celebration of Iran began, celebrating the birth of Persia with the most expensive party in history. Prominent guests, including world leaders, were invited by the Shah of Iran to a lavish banquet at the "tent city" set up near the ruins of the ancient Persian capital of Persepolis (near modern-day Marvdasht), funded from the national treasury even though 90 percent of the 28 million citizens lived in poverty.
- The Rock 'n Roll Revival was staged by promoter Richard Nader at Madison Square Garden in New York City to feature hit singers from the 1950s, including Rick Nelson, hired to sing their best-known songs. Nelson was booed by the audience when he sang new material, and turned the experience of the evening into a 1972 hit song, "Garden Party", with the memorable chorus "But it's all right now, I learned my lesson well; You see, you can't please everyone, so... you gotta please yourself."
- "Midnight Madness", a tradition unique to U.S. college basketball, was initiated by University of Maryland head coach Charles "Lefty" Driesell. At the time, the NCAA did not allow college teams to begin practice earlier than October 15, so Driesell scheduled an event for the public to see the Maryland Terrapins begin practicing in the first minutes of 15 October, starting at 12:03 a.m. The concept would later be adopted by additional colleges as a fun way to unveil the new season every year.
- A 5.5 magnitude earthquake killed at least 40 people in the Aymaraes Province of Peru, reportedly destroying six villages in landslides from the Andes Mountains.
- Born: Niko Kovač, Croatian soccer football midfielder and manager with 83 appearances for the Croatia national team, later manager of the Croatia team, as well as the Bundesliga teams Eintracht Frankfurt and Bayern Munich; in Wedding, West Berlin.
- Died: William Hill, 68, English bookmaking gambling magnate who founded William Hill, Ltd, the UK's largest legalized gambling firm

== October 16, 1971 (Saturday) ==
- All ten people aboard a Cessna 402 plane, operated by Scenic Airways, were killed in a crash during an attempted sightseeing tour that had taken off from North Las Vegas, Nevada, on an aerial tour of the Grand Canyon in Arizona.
- Art Arfons, an American racer who broke the world land speed record on three occasions in his turbojet-powered automobile, the Green Monster, accidentally killed three people in an accident at the Dallas International Motor Speedway. Arfons lost control of his vehicle. Though he survived, his passenger, WFAA TV reporter Gene Thomas, was killed, in addition to two employees of the International Hot Rod Association (IHRA), Robert Kelsey and Sean Pence.
- Lon Nol, Prime Minister of the Khmer Republic (formerly Cambodia), issued a decree removing the powers of the national parliament as part of fighting the ongoing war against the communist Khmer Rouge. Four days later, Lon asked rhetorically in a national radio address "Should we vainly play the game of democracy and freedom which will lead us to complete defeat— or should we curtail anarchical freedom in order to achieve victory?"
- Died:
  - Robin Boyd, 52, Australian architect, of a post-operative stroke
  - James E. Allen Jr., 60, former United States Commissioner of Education (from 1969 to 1970) was killed in the Scenic Airways crash, along with his wife and eight other people.

== October 17, 1971 (Sunday) ==
- The Pittsburgh Pirates defeated the Baltimore Orioles to win Game 7 of the best-of-seven World Series and captured the championship of Major League Baseball.
- Nineteen of the 21 people on board an Aerolíneas TAO C-74 were killed in Colombia when the plane crashed shortly after takeoff from San Vicente del Caguán on a flight bound for Neiva. The plane was only certified to carry cargo and three crewmembers, and was not supposed to have passengers at all.
- The first STOLport, designed for short takeoff and landing (stoL) airplanes in a limited amount of space, opened at the Walt Disney World Resort at Lake Buena Vista, Florida, for shuttle service two and from the airport in Orlando.
- The first meeting of the Northern Resistance Movement took place in Omagh, Northern Ireland.
- Born: Chris Kirkpatrick, American pop music singer and a vocalist for the group NSYNC; in Clarion, Pennsylvania
- Died: Bevo Howard, 57, American aerobatic pilot, was killed in a crash while performing at an airshow in Greenville, North Carolina

== October 18, 1971 (Monday) ==
- In New York City, the Knapp Commission began public hearings on police corruption.
- Soviet Union Premier Alexei Kosygin was mugged while visiting Ottawa as the guest of Canada's Prime Minister Pierre Trudeau. Geza Matrai, an unarmed Hungarian immigrant and resident of Toronto, broke through a ring of Soviet and Canadian security guards, shouted "Freedom for Hungary!", and tried to wrestle Kosygin to the ground before he was stopped.

== October 19, 1971 (Tuesday) ==
- The U.S. Senate voted unanimously, 84 to 0, to make it more difficult for states to call for a second constitutional convention, one of the two provisions under Article V of the United States Constitution for rewriting the 1787 document. For the first 186 years of the U.S. Constitution's existence, any decisions made at such a convention required just a simple majority of the delegates, with no limit as to what could be one. A 45 to 39 vote of the Senate increased the requirement to at least two-thirds of the delegates at the convention, and the Senate approved the resolution in its entirety. In addition, the new rule required that delegates could only vote on matters specifically referred to in calls for a convention approved by two-thirds of the state legislatures. By July 1969, 33 of the 50 states, one short of the required 34, had passed a variety of resolutions calling for a convention. The Senate bill effectively made the resolutions ineffective.
- All 15 of the elderly residents of the Geiger Nursing Home near Honesdale, Pennsylvania, died in a fire. After an investigation of nearly six years, the county coroner would conclude that one of the residents who died in the blaze had deliberately set the fire.
- U.S. Vice President Spiro T. Agnew, making a controversial trip to Greece on behalf of the United States, was welcomed at the Greek village of Gargalianoi, from which his father Theophrastos Anagnostopoulos had emigrated in 1897.
- Died: Betty Bronson, 64, American silent film star

== October 20, 1971 (Wednesday) ==
- West Germany's Chancellor Willy Brandt was awarded the Nobel Peace Prize for his policy of Ostpolitik, becoming the first head of government to win since U.S. President Woodrow Wilson in 1920.
- Born:
  - Snoop Dogg (stage name for Calvin Broadus Jr.), American hip hop music rapper and actor, in Long Beach, California
  - Dannii Minogue, Australian pop music singer and TV actress; in Melbourne
  - Eddie Jones, American pro basketball player with 14 NBA seasons; in Pompano Beach, Florida
- Died:
  - Shtjefën Kurti, 72, Albanian Roman Catholic priest, executed by a firing squad in Albania, which had proclaimed itself "the world's first atheist nation"; Kurti had been convicted of administering religious sacraments for the baptism of a child. News of the execution would not reach the West until 1973, when the RAI television network in Italy announced it.

== October 21, 1971 (Thursday) ==
- Twenty-two people were killed and over a hundred injured in a gas explosion that devastated the town centre of Clarkston, East Renfrewshire near Glasgow in Scotland.
- U.S. President Richard Nixon nominated Lewis Franklin Powell Jr. and William H. Rehnquist to the U.S. Supreme Court to fill the recent vacancies caused by the retirement of Hugo Black and John M. Harlan.
- Chilean poet Pablo Neruda was named as the laureate for the Nobel Prize for Literature.
- Born:
  - Jade Jagger, English-Nicaraguan model and socialite, in Paris, to Mick Jagger and Bianca Jagger.
  - Turki bin Abdullah Al Saud, Saudi Arabian reformer and royal family member, Governor of Riyadh Province later jailed for corruption; in Riyadh
- Died:
  - Bhadase Maraj, 52, Trinidanian Hindu religious leader
  - Raymond Hatton, 84, prolific American vaudeville stage, film and TV actor who appeared in almost 500 films

== October 22, 1971 (Friday) ==
- Music from Scott Joplin's rediscovered opera Treemonisha was performed for the first time in more than 55 years, in a concert in the auditorium at the New York Public Library for the Performing Arts, with musicians William Bolcom, Mary Lou Williams and Joshua Rifkin supplying Joplin's score for the operatic singers; a full performance would be made at the Lincoln Center on January 28, 1972.
- The coming-of-age film The Last Picture Show premiered in the United States.

== October 23, 1971 (Saturday) ==
- Typhoon Hester, the worst natural disaster to strike Vietnam during the Vietnam War, swept over the five northernmost provinces of South Vietnam, along with southern provinces of North Vietnam and the DMZ. At least 85 people in South Vietnam and an indeterminate number in North Vietnam were killed directly by the storm and 33 were killed in the crash of a South Vietnamese Air Force transport flying through the heavy weather.
- Partick Thistle defeated Celtic F.C. of Glasgow, 4 to 1 in a major upset to win the Scottish League Cup in soccer football. Not only had Celtic finished in first place in the 1970–71 season to win the Scottish League Division One championship with a record of 25 wins, 6 draws and 3 losses, but Thistle was also new to Division One, having been promoted by finishing in first place in the 1970-71 Division Two play. A crowd of 62,470 had turned out at Hampden Park and saw that team "who have no chance" take a 4 to 0 lead in the first 37 minutes of play.
- Died: Ion Rîmaru, 25, Romanian serial killer known as "The Vampire of Bucharest" (vampirul din București) for his brutal rapes and assaults of 14 women (four of them fatal), was executed by a firing squad at Jilava Prison.

== October 24, 1971 (Sunday) ==
- The first unofficial world anthem, "United Nations Hymn", made its debut at the celebration of the 26th anniversary of the founding of the United Nations. Created at the request of UN Secretary General U Thant, with spoken words by poet W. H. Auden and orchestral music by Pablo Casals rather than an attempt to synchronize lyrics with a melody, the work was created for the occasion, and there has been no effort to create an official song for the UN.
- Born: Dervla Kirwan, Irish stage, film and TV actress, in Dublin
- Died:
  - Chuck Hughes, 28, American pro football wide receiver and the only NFL player to die on the field during a game. Shortly before suffering a heart attack, Hughes, playing for the Detroit Lions in a game against the visiting Chicago Bears, had gained 32 yards on a pass. He collapsed as he was returning to the huddle with 1:02 left in the game.
  - Gladys Coates Sanford, 80, New Zealand aviator and volunteer ambulance driver for the NZEF in World War One. A children's book about her, Gladys goes to War, would be published in 2016, 45 years after her death.
  - Indian Army Major General Sahib Singh Sokhey, 83, Indian biochemist and director of the Haffkine Institute who coordinated nationwide inoculation efforts to stop the spread of plagues within India.

== October 25, 1971 (Monday) ==
- United Nations General Assembly Resolution 2758, admitting the People's Republic of China to the United Nations as the recognized representative of the Chinese people, was approved by a required two-thirds majority, with 76 nations in favor, 35 opposed and 17 abstaining. Titled "Restoration of the lawful rights of the People's Republic of China in the United Nations", Resolution 2758 also made the Republic of China, based primarily on the offshore island of Taiwan, the first (and, thus far, only) nation to be expelled from the UN. The PRC took the place of Taiwan as one of the five permanent members of the United Nations Security Council. The U.S., Japan, Australia, South Africa, Saudi Arabia and the Republic of China were among the members voting against 2758, while the UK, the USSR, France, India, Canada and Mexico voted in favor. Another resolution that would have required a two-thirds vote to expel Taiwan, failed 55 to 59. With Taiwan's expulsion certain, its representative to the U.N., Liu Chieh, walked out before the vote along with Taiwanese Foreign Minister Chow Shu-kai and the rest of the delegation. Upon departure, Taiwan announced that it would not pay the outstanding $30,200,000 owed to the UN for membership dues.
- Born:
  - Midori (Midori Goto), Japanese-born American violinist and former child prodigy; in Hirakata, Osaka prefecture.
  - Pedro Martínez, Dominican-born baseball pitcher and inductee into the Baseball Hall of Fame; in Manoguayabo, Santo Domingo. Martínez had the best ERA in major league baseball in five different seasons between 1997 and 2003), and the 10th most successful pitcher in MLB history;
  - Athena Chu, Hong Kong film actress and singer; in Kowloon
- Died:
  - Paul Terry, 84, U.S. cartoonist, film director and animator who operated the "Terrytoons" studio that invented cartoon characters such as Mighty Mouse and Heckle & Jeckle.
  - Philip Wylie, 69, U.S. science fiction writer and publisher whose works included When Worlds Collide in 1933

== October 26, 1971 (Tuesday) ==
- A gap in the air defense of the United States was revealed when a Cuban Antonov An-24 airliner landed at the New Orleans international airport after having flown from Havana without being detected. The 19 people on the plane, who flew in without authorization, had chartered the flight to participate in a conference of the International Society of Sugar Cane Technologists.
- A group of homeowners in the U.S. state of Maine voted, 21 to 13, to incorporate their area as the town of Carrabassett Valley, which now has a population of about 800 people.
- U.S. chess champion Bobby Fischer defeated former world champ Tigran Petrosian in Argentina to win the right to challenge Boris Spassky for the world championship of chess. The final match of the elimination series took place in Buenos Aires.
- Born:
  - Audley Harrison, British boxer, in London
  - Lino Rulli, American radio host known for his program The Catholic Guy Show; in St. Paul, Minnesota
- Died:
  - Yves de la Casinière, 74, French composer and musician
  - Gbadebo II, Nigerian Yoruba monarch as the Alake of Egbaland since 1963

== October 27, 1971 (Wednesday) ==
- The Democratic Republic of the Congo was renamed Zaire, as the first step of President Joseph Mobutu's authenticité program of replacing French personal names with African names. Formerly the Belgian Congo, the nation became independent as the Republic of the Congo in 1960 at the same time that the former French Congo became independent at the same time, and had been unofficially called "Congo-Léopoldville" to distinguish it from the former French Congo (unofficially Congo-Brazzaville). The Zaire name would last for almost 26 years before the nation's restoration to the Democratic Republic of the Congo name after Mobutu's overthrow on May 16, 1997.
- The first round of parliamentary elections took place in Egypt as 1,661 candidates vied for the 350 elected seats in the 360-seat People's Assembly, and 209 candidates won a majority. In races for the other 141 seats, a November 3 runoff election was held between the two highest vote getters.
- The leaders of France and the Soviet Union signed a 10-year trade agreement in Paris, where Soviet Communist Party leader Leonid Brezhnev was being hosted on a state visit by French President Georges Pompidou.
- Dr. Gerard Newe became the first Roman Catholic member of the government of predominantly-Protestant Northern Ireland in the province's history, agreeing to become the Minister of State in the office of Prime Minister Brian Faulkner.
- Born:
  - Reema Khan, Pakistani film actress; in Lahore
  - Sam Otada, Ugandan business entrepreneur and chairman of the Otada Group of Companies; in Kiryandongo
  - Igor Vladimirovich Makeyev, Azerbaijani national hero; in Ganja, Azerbaijan SSR, Soviet Union (killed in battle, 1992)
- Died:
  - Herbert Sutcliffe, 85, British alternative health advocate and founder of the School of Radiant Living.
  - Ahmed Timol, 29, South African Communist Party activist, died in police custody in Johannesburg five days after being arrested, after falling from a window on the tenth floor of the Johannesburg Central Police Station. A police investigation would rule that Timol had committed suicide; in 2017, the post-Apartheid South African government concluded that Timol had been murdered by three officers at the station, two of whom died before 2017. A third was charged with murder but died in 2021 before he could be tried.

== October 28, 1971 (Thursday) ==
- The British House of Commons voted 356–244 in favour of joining the European Economic Community.
- The United Kingdom became the sixth nation to launch a satellite into orbit. Prospero X-3 was sent aloft from the Royal Australian Air Force base at Woomera, South Australia, using a Black Arrow carrier rocket at 5:00 a.m. local time (1930 UTC on 27 October).
- Egypt's 102-year old Khedivial Opera House in Cairo burned down.
- In advance of the October 31 inauguration of President Nguyen Van Thieu to a second term, the government of South Vietnam announced that it would release 2,938 Viet Cong prisoners, all South Vietnamese rebels who had joined the Communist Party, from detention camps. The first 618 were released later in the week and 2,320 others were required to go through rehabilitation. The release, the largest amnesty of the war, began on October 31.

== October 29, 1971 (Friday) ==
- A cyclone and tidal wave killed more than 15,000 people in the Orissa (now Odisha) state of India, with casualties in the state of West Bengal and in parts of East Pakistan (now Bangladesh). Waves as high as 16 feet (4.9 m) swept over India's southeastern coast onto low-lying areas.
- Born:
  - Winona Ryder, American actress, as Winona Laura Horowitz, near Winona, Minnesota
  - Matthew Hayden, Australian cricketer, in Kingaroy, Queensland
  - Ma Huateng, Chinese business magnate and, at one time, the wealthiest person in the People's Republic of China as the co-founder of the internet firm Tencent; in Dongfang, Hainan;
- Died:
  - Duane Allman, 24, American rock musician and leader of the Allman Brothers Band, was killed in a motorcycle accident in his hometown of Macon, Georgia, after losing control while trying to avoid a collision with a truck that had slowed down in front of him.
  - Arne Tiselius, 69, Swedish biochemist and 1948 Nobel laureate

== October 30, 1971 (Saturday) ==
- Eighty-nine people were killed in Romania in the collapse of a dam holding mine sludge, as buildings in the villages of Certeju de Sus and Sacaramb were buried.
- At least 22 construction workers died in a fire that broke out during the remodeling of a ship in Hong Kong's Aberdeen Harbour that was to open as the Jumbo Floating Restaurant.
- The Toronto Telegram daily newspaper, founded on April 18, 1876, published its final issue after more than 95 years of existence.,
- Died: Jim Pittman, 46, American college head football coach, suffered a fatal heart attack while coaching the Texas Christian University (TCU) football team at a game against host Baylor University in Waco, Texas. Shortly after kickoff, Pittman collapsed while standing on the sidelines.

== October 31, 1971 (Sunday) ==
- Women voted in Switzerland for the first time as elections were held for the 200 seats of the National Council, the first since the February 7 referendum allowing women's suffrage. At least three women were elected to the lower house of the council, including attorney Elisabeth Blunschy in the Canton of Schwyz— one of several counties that did not permit women to vote for the upper house of the council.
- The new Pope of the Coptic Orthodox Church was selected in random fashion in Egypt to replace Pope Cyril VI, who had died on March 9. Nazir Gayed Roufail, Bishop Anba Shenouda of Abnub, was picked as the 117th Pope at the Cathedral of St. Mark in Cairo, two days after Coptic clergymen had voted to place the names of three candidates— Bishop Shenouda, Bishop Samuel and the Reverend Timotheus El Makary— into a silver box. A six-year-old boy, Ayman Munir Kamel, was then blindfolded and made the pick in order to fulfill the requirement that the choice represent "the will of God". On November 15, he was consecrated as Pope Shenouda III.
- A bomb caused severe damage to the Post Office Tower in London, at the time the tallest building in the UK at 620 feet (190 m). A caller claiming to represent "the Kilburn battalion of the I.R.A." took credit, Kilburn being a suburb of northwest London with a large Irish population.
- Nguyen Van Thieu was sworn in to a new four-year term as President of South Vietnam amid heavy security in Saigon after an October 3 election in which he was the only candidate. Thieu would serve less than 3 1/2 years of his term, fleeing the country on April 21, 1975, in the face of the invasion of Saigon by North Vietnamese troops.
