= September 1971 =

Month of 1971

<<	September 1971					>>
Su	Mo	Tu	We	Th	Fr	Sa
			1	2	3	4
5	6	7	8	9	10	11
12	13	14	15	16	17	18
19	20	21	22	23	24	25
26	27	28	29	30

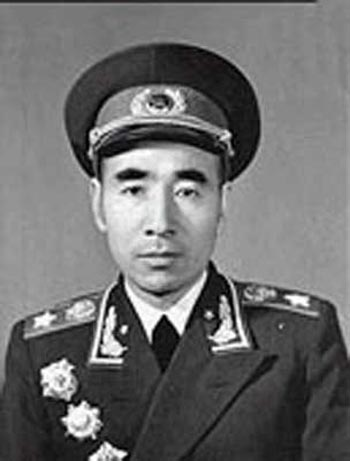
September 13, 1971: Lin Biao, Vice Chairman to Mao Zedong, is killed in an air crash while fleeing the country

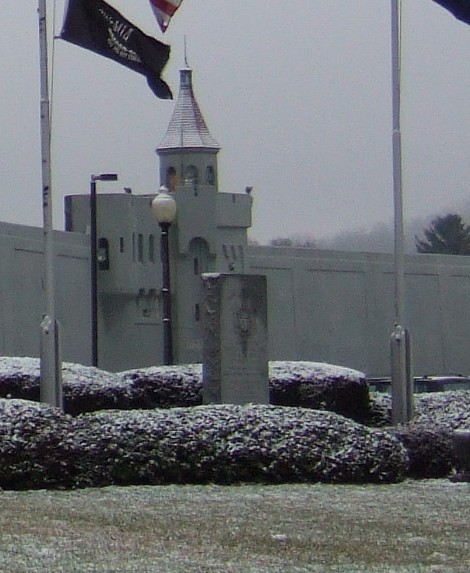
September 9–13, 1971: Attica Prison uprising in New York state results in 43 deaths, including nine hostages

September 3, 1971: Emirate of Qatar proclaims independence

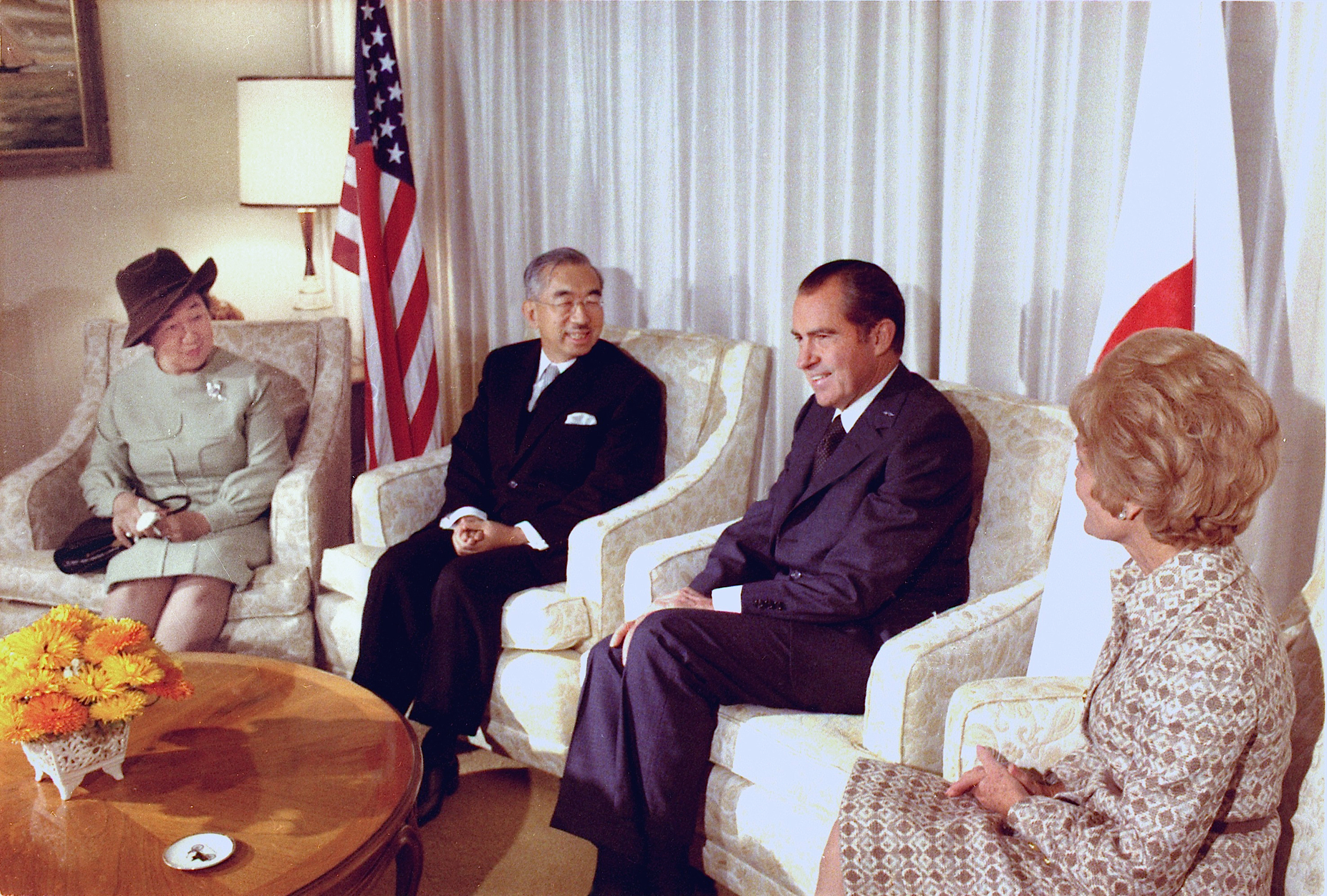
September 27, 1971: Hirohito becomes first Emperor to leave Japan, meets with U.S. President Nixon on September 26

The following events occurred in September 1971:

== September 1, 1971 (Wednesday) ==
- Voting took place simultaneously in Egypt, Syria and Libya on a referendum of whether to join the proposed Federation of Arab Republics. On paper ballots, citizens were to mark a red circle if they were in favor and a black circle if they were against the union, and participation in the voting was mandatory. Voters approved the loose federation that would bring together 42 million of the 100 million Arab people in the Middle East, with a reported 96.4% approval in Syria, 98% in Libya, and "99.956%" in Egypt (meaning that only 422 out of 7,776,837 voted no).
- A radio broadcast from Qatar announced the intention of the rulers of the Arab sheikdom to declare independence, with the announcement that Qatar was going to terminate "special treaty relations and all agreements, engagements and arrangements arising therefrom that were concluded with the British government."
- The Pittsburgh Pirates fielded the first all-black lineup in Major League Baseball history, with six African-American players (Rennie Stennett, Gene Clines, Willie Stargell, Dave Cash, Al Oliver, and Dock Ellis) and three dark-skinned Hispanic players (Roberto Clemente, Manny Sanguillén and Jackie Hernández). The Pirates beat the Philadelphia Phillies, 10 to 7, with the non-white lineup scoring five runs in the first inning.
- The "Prime Time Access Rule" went into effect on U.S. television, prohibiting the three national networks (ABC, CBS and NBC) from airing programs prior to 8:00 p.m. Eastern time on all nights except for Sunday. The 7:30 to 8:00 time slot, formerly open for network shows, was reserved for the network affiliates to sell local commercial time.
- Born: Hakan Şükür, Turkish footballer with 112 appearances for the Turkey National Team; in Sapanca, Sakarya Province
- Died: Assault, 28, American thoroughbred racehorse and 1946 Triple Crown winner, was humanely euthanized at the King Ranch in Kingsville, Texas after breaking his left front leg in a fall.

== September 2, 1971 (Thursday) ==
- In announcing the results of the referendum on the Federation of Arab Republics, the Egyptian government ceased referring to the nation as the "United Arab Republic" for the first time in more than 13 years, and identified the country as "The Arab Republic of Egypt".
- Ten people were killed in a stampede in the city of Udaipur in India's Rajasthan state after thousands of people showed up in response to a dealership's announcement of a registration for purchase of motor scooters. At the time, the demand for motorized transportation exceeded the available supply to the extent that the waiting time for delivery was an average of nine years after registration.

== September 3, 1971 (Friday) ==
Qatar

- Qatar gained independence from the United Kingdom, under the leadership of the Emir Ahmad bin Ali Al Thani. Qatar declined to become part of the United Arab Emirates after being unable to reach a favorable agreement about its status within a union.
- Michael McConnell and Jack Baker, a librarian and a law student, respectively, at the University of Minnesota, became the first-ever legally married same-sex couple in modern history after obtaining a marriage license from the county clerk's office in Mankato in Blue Earth County, and then having the ceremony performed by a Methodist minister, Reverend Roger Lynn, at the minister's home. The two men had an ongoing lawsuit, Baker v. Nelson, arising from the denial of a license in Hennepin County, and went to another county during the pendency of the litigation. While the U.S. Supreme Court refused to hear the case arising from Hennepin County, the couple's marriage in Blue Earth County was never challenged.

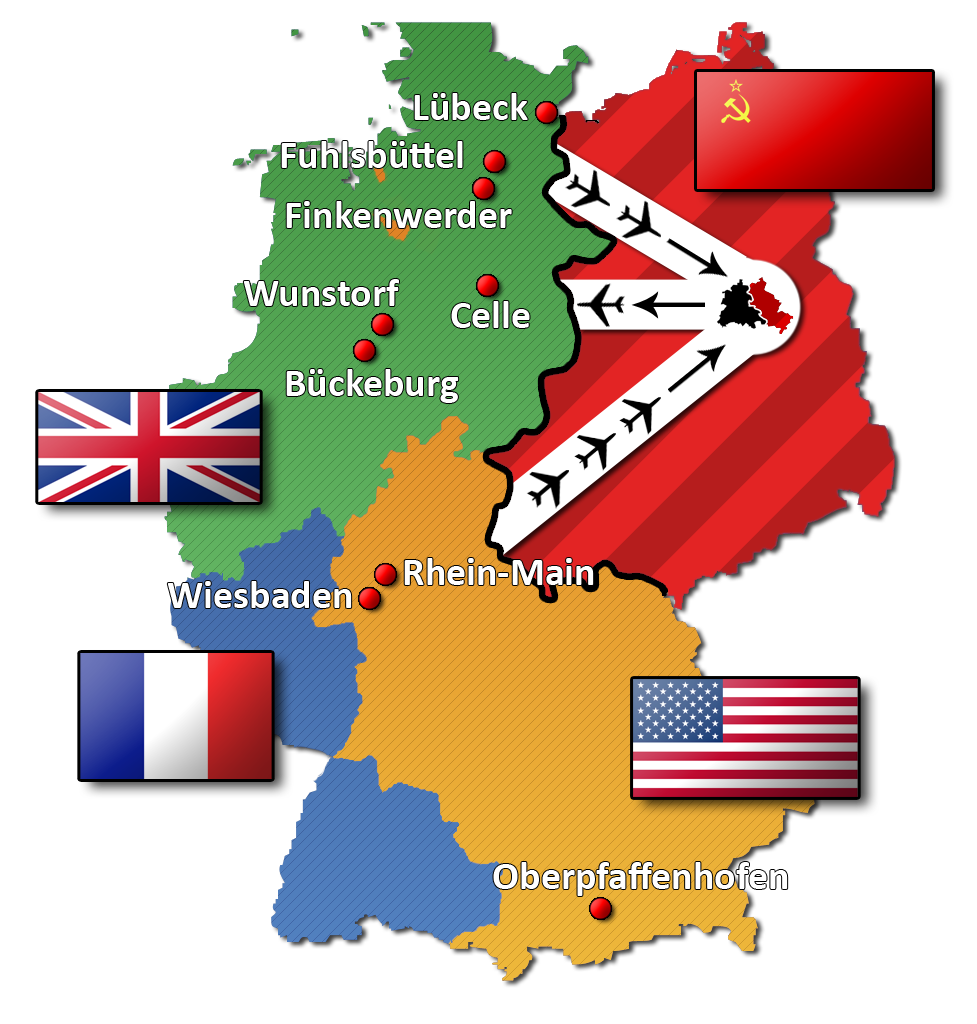
The corridors across East Germany

- The Quadripartite Agreement on Berlin was signed by the leading foreign affairs representatives of the four Allied powers of World War II, Alec Douglas-Home of the United Kingdom, Maurice Schumann of France, Andrei Gromyko of the Soviet Union, and U.S. Secretary of State William P. Rogers, with the Soviets respecting the existence of a West Berlin surrounded entirely by East Germany, and the "corridors" between West Berlin and West Germany.
- In the United States, Northwest Orient Airlines was acquired and merged into National Airlines.
- Under the authorization of U.S. presidential adviser John Ehrlichman, a team of burglars who would later coordinate the Watergate burglary, broke into the office of Dr. Lewis Fielding, a psychiatrist in Washington who was treating former U.S. Department of Defense employee Daniel Ellsberg, who had leaked the "Pentagon Papers" to the press earlier in the year. The burglars were able to locate Ellsberg's file but were not able to find any useful information.
- Sergei Kourdakov, a former agent of the Soviet Union's KGB and an officer on a trawler, defected to Canada while the ship, the Elagin, was anchored in the Vancouver harbor. Kourdakov would be granted political asylum by Canada, but would be found dead from a gunshot wound on January 1, 1973.

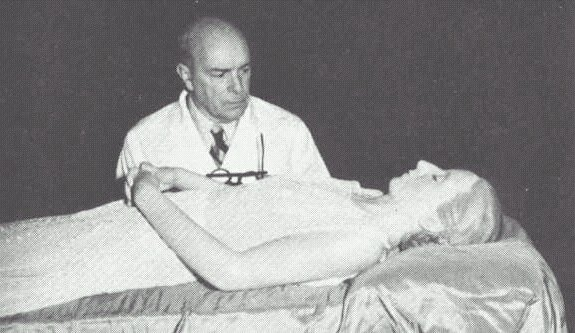
The late Eva Perón

- The embalmed body of Eva "Evita" Perón, concealed by Argentina since the 1955 overthrow and exile of President Juan Perón, was returned to Mr. Perón in Spain. The location of Evita, who had died of cancer in 1952 after seven years as First Lady of Argentina, had been a mystery for 16 years, relocated to avoid the possibility that Peronists would make a shrine of Evita's burial place. Instead, the remains of Evita, held in a silver coffin, had been in Italy "in a small cemetery near Rome".
- Manlio Brosio resigned as NATO Secretary General.
- Long distance telephone service was restored between the United States and the People's Republic of China, almost three years after the link had been abruptly terminated in November 1968. The AT&T company said that calls could be made between 9:00 a.m. to 9:00 p.m. Eastern time, corresponding with 9:00 p.m. to 9:00 a.m. in Beijing, at a rate of a minimum of $12 for a call of up to three minutes, $4 for each additional minute.

== September 4, 1971 (Saturday) ==
- All 111 people on Alaska Airlines Flight 1866 were killed when a Boeing 727 crashed into the side of a mountain near Juneau, Alaska. The accident was the worst single aircraft disaster in U.S. history up to that time. The flight had originated in Anchorage and had a final scheduled destination of Seattle, making multiple stops, and made a premature descent on its approach to Juneau, flying too low to avoid crashing into the Chilkat Range at an altitude of 2,475 feet (754 m).
- The Concorde supersonic airliner made its first transatlantic crossing. After departing Toulouse in France and landing at Sal Rei in the Cape Verde Islands off of the coast of Africa, the Concorde 001 prototype departed Sal Rei and flew 2,485 miles (3,999 km) to Cayenne in French Guiana in South America in two hours and two minutes at an average speed of more than 1,222 miles per hour (1,967 km/h).
- Major General Hassan al-Amri, was forced to resign as Prime Minister of the Yemen Arab Republic by President Abdul Rahman al-Eryani, after Amri had shot and killed a photographer on August 29.
- The Portuguese freighter MV Ricardo Manuel, arriving from Lisbon, was coming into the Casablanca harbor of Morocco in a thick fog, and was cut in two in a collision with the Moroccan freighter MV Zagora. The Ricardo Manuel sank in the harbor, but its crew of 10 was rescued by the Zagora.
- In an unusual and never-explained incident, a large sack of flour literally "dropped from the sky" onto the baseball field at Dodger Stadium in Los Angeles during a game between the Los Angeles Dodgers and the Cincinnati Reds during the fifth inning. The sack was "heavy enough to kill anyone it hit" and landed 10 feet (3.0 m) in front of Cincinnati shortstop Woody Woodward. The Dodgers went on to win, 2 to 1, in front of a crowd of 21,148 fans.
- Died: Bourke B. Hickenlooper, 75, former U.S. Senator for Iowa (1945-1969) and Governor (1943-1945), died of a heart attack caused by arteriosclerosis. He was visiting friends on Long Island at Shelter Island, New York.

== September 5, 1971 (Sunday) ==
- Seven people were killed and 20 injured in the destruction of a church in the Portuguese village of Vilar Maior, near Sabugal, when fireworks stockpiled in the church exploded. The village was preparing for its annual festival and had stored the explosives at the building.
- The 1971 Women's World Cup final in Association football (an event not recognized by FIFA) was played. Denmark defeated the host, Mexico, 3 goals to 0, and Denmark's Susanne Augustesen made all of the scores. The tournament, with six teams (Argentina, Denmark, England, France, Italy and Mexico) had started on August 15).
- The All-Ireland Hurling Championship was played before 61,393 people at Croke Park in Dublin and was won by Tipperary over Kilkenny on the strength of 17 points to 14 points, each team having scored five 3-point goals.

== September 6, 1971 (Monday) ==
- The crash of Paninternational Flight 112 killed 21 passengers and one crew member, out of 121 people on board. The BAC One-Eleven jet's engines failed shortly after takeoff from Hamburg in West Germany and the pilots made an emergency landing on Autobahn 7, where the plane lost both wings after passing under a bridge and burst into flames.
- The Tupamaros terrorist group in Uruguay freed 105 of its members from the maximum security penitentiary in the Punta Carretas section of Montevideo, including Tupamaros founder Raul Sendic and five other inmates, after digging a 40 ft (12 m) long tunnel from a house located across the street from the prison. On July 17, the Tupamaros had freed 39 women from another jail in Montevideo by digging upward from a sewer underneath a prison cell.
- The Coney Island Amusement Park in Cincinnati, Ohio, closed at the end of the U.S. Labor Day weekend after 84 years. Most of its rides became the core of the new Kings Island theme park that would open in 1972.
- The British Broadcasting Corporation (BBC) announced that it was banning the U.S. educational children's TV program Sesame Street from broadcast in the UK because of the "authoritarian aims" of the show. Monica Sims, the director of children's television programming on BBC, told reporters "Educationalists in America have questioned the value of 2-, 3- and 4-year olds' acquiring knowledge in a passive, uninvolved fashion, and have criticised the program's essentially middle-class attitudes, its lack of reality and its attempt to prepare children for school but not for life. I share some of these doubts and am particularly worried about the program's authoritarian aims." The Independent Television Authority announced afterward that it would show Sesame Street on ITV stations on Saturday mornings for 30 weeks beginning on September 25.
- Born: Dolores O'Riordan, Irish singer, in Ballybricken, County Limerick (died 2018)

== September 7, 1971 (Tuesday) ==
- The Equality Statute between Brazil and Portugal was agreed upon by both nations, in a unique relationship giving Brazilian residents of Portugal and Portuguese residents of Brazil most of the same rights as citizens. The treaty would be ratified by both nations and enter into force on April 22, 1972.
- The collapse of a 1,285 ft (392 m) tall television broadcasting tower at Shoreview, Minnesota, killed six ironworkers who were on the structure, and a superintendent who was watching from below. The tower was used by TV stations WCCO-TV and WTCN-TV and served the Twin Cities of Minneapolis and St. Paul. Two men inside the WCCO transmitter building were injured.
- Born: Jean-Yves Thibaudet, French pianist, in Lyon
- Died: Spring Byington, 84, American film and television actress known as the star of the TV show December Bride

== September 8, 1971 (Wednesday) ==
- What would later be determined to have been the triggering event of the deadly Attica Prison riot began as "a misunderstanding" in the prison yard at 3:45 in the afternoon when a white inmate, Ray Lamorie, was showing a black inmate, Leroy Dewer, potential moves for the prison football team that both were members of. A guard, Lt. Richard Mulroney, mistook the demonstration for a fight and put his hand on Dewer's shoulder, and Dewer instinctively turned around and struck Mulroney. Other guards detained Dewer and Lamorie, and a rumor spread that the two inmates had been beaten. Lamorie's friends then rebelled.

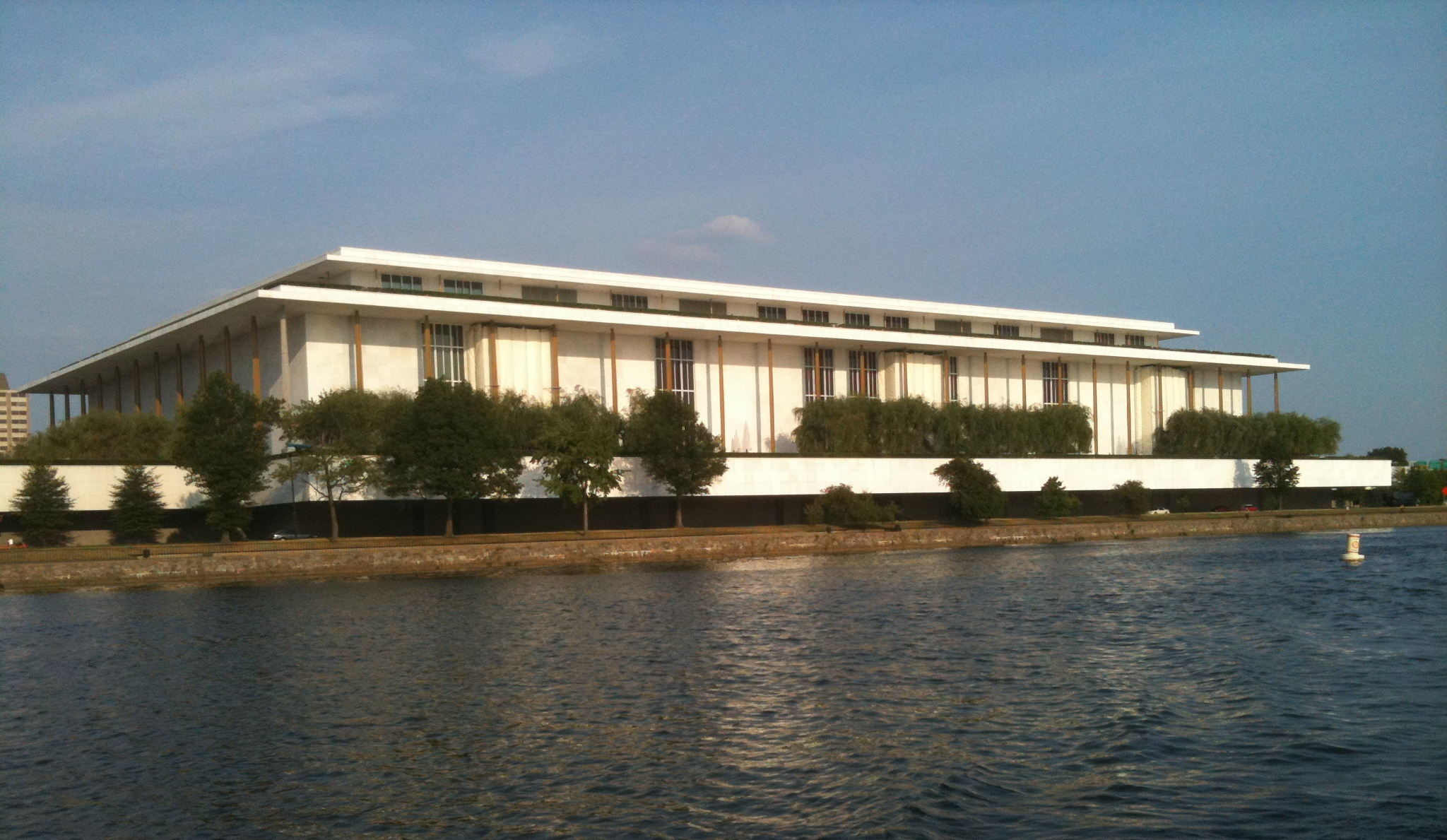
The Kennedy Center

- In Washington, D.C., the John F. Kennedy Center for the Performing Arts was dedicated with the première of Leonard Bernstein's Mass. A critic commented the next day that "The capital of this nation finally strode into the Cultural Age tonight," and noted that "The rich, celebrated and powerful flocked to the world premiere of Leonard Bernstein's Mass in the gigantic marble temple to music, dance and drama on the Potomac's edge."

== September 9, 1971 (Thursday) ==
- Attica Prison riot: An uprising of prisoners broke out at the maximum-security penitentiary at Attica, New York, at 8:50 in the morning as a group of inmates on the 5 Gallery on cellblock "A" charged from the prison dining hall and overpowered guards who were attempting to stop them. Eventually, 42 members of the prison staff at the Attica Correctional Facility were taken hostage. After four days, law enforcement officials stormed the facility on September 13. Forty-three people were killed, including nine hostages.
- What would become known as U.S. President Nixon's "Enemies List", prepared by White House Public Liaison Charles Colson, was sent in the form of attachments to a memorandum written by Colson to White House Counsel John W. Dean, initially with 250 names. On June 26, 1973, Dean would reveal the existence of the list in testimony before the U.S. Senate special committee investigating the Watergate burglary.
- Sir Geoffrey Jackson, the British Ambassador to Uruguay, was released from captivity by his kidnappers, the Tupamaro guerrillas, three days after the escape of 106 Tupamaros from prison. Jackson had been kidnapped on January 8 and remained a hostage for eight months. In 2002, more than 30 years after Jackson had been freed, a London newspaper, The Daily Telegraph, would reveal that Prime Minister Edward Heath, working through Chilean President Salvador Allende, had approved payment of £42,000 to the Tupamaros in return for Jackson's release.
- Elections were held in Barbados for the 24 seats in the House of Assembly. The ruling Democratic Labour Party, led by Prime Minister Errol Barrow, increased its 12 to 8 majority to an 18 to 6 majority over the Barbados Labour Party.
- The Star, which would become the highest-circulation newspaper in the nation of Malaysia, published its first issue, starting originally as a regional paper covering Penang.
- Imagine, the second solo album by John Lennon, was released in the United States.

== September 10, 1971 (Friday) ==
- Time-Life, Inc. and Sterling Communications were granted authority by Federal Communications Commission (FCC) to begin a pay television service for cable TV subscribers, which would be launched on November 8, 1972, as Home Box Office (HBO).
- The submarine USS Regulus was decommissioned after running aground during Typhoon Rose.
- The Bell 309 KingCobra helicopter flew for the first time.
- Died:
  - Pier Angeli, 39, Italian actress, of an overdose of barbiturates
  - Roland de Vaux, 67, French Benedictine priest and archaeologist
  - Lynn Eusan, 22, African-American journalist who had made history in 1968 as becoming the first black homecoming queen at a white Southern university (the University of Houston) was stabbed to death.

== September 11, 1971 (Saturday) ==
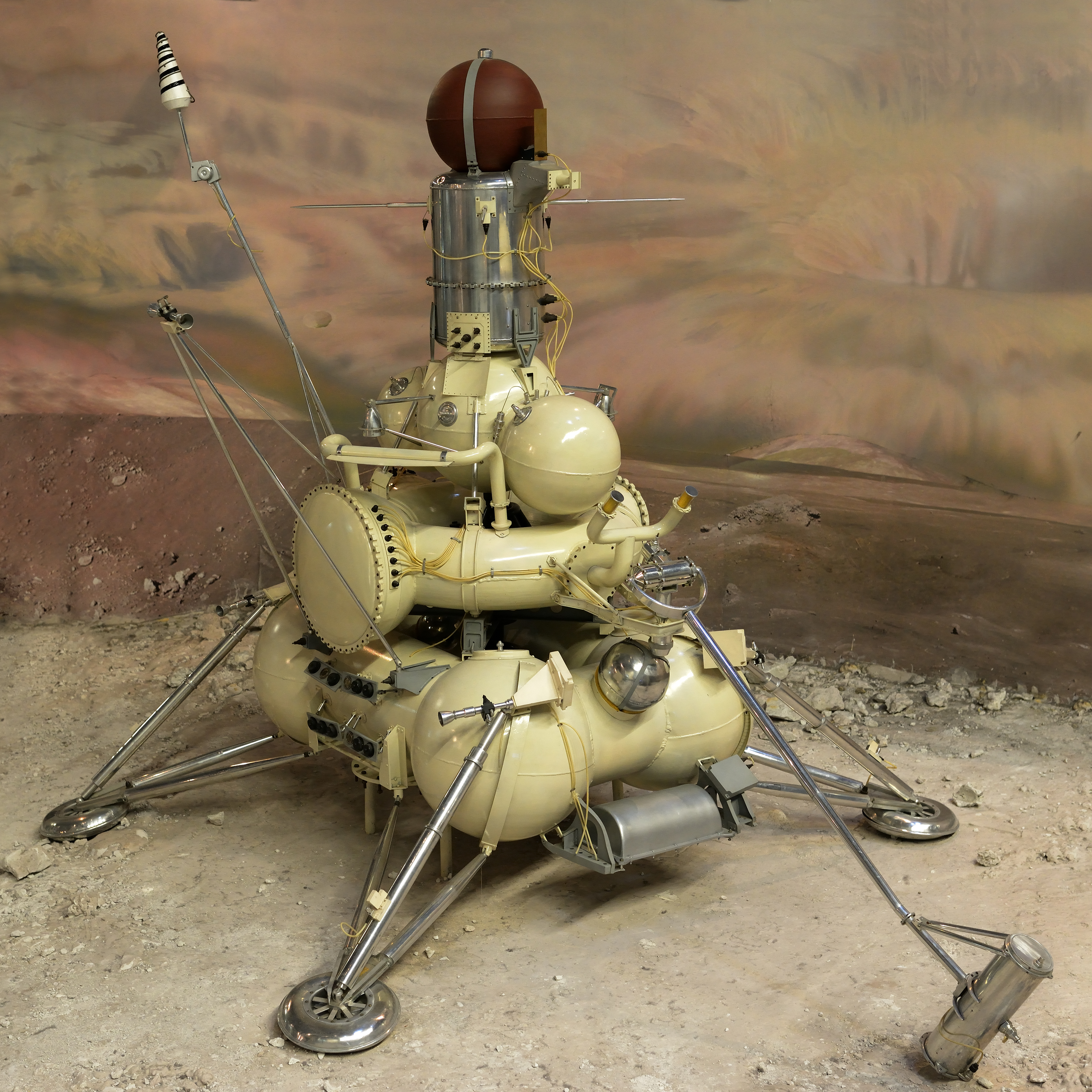
The Luna probe series (pictured: Luna 16)

- The Soviet lunar probe Luna 18 reached the Moon but crashed as a landing was attempted in a mountainous area of the Mare Fecunditatis. The TASS news agency conceded the failure, commenting that "the moon landing in these difficult topographical conditions was unlucky."
- Egypt reverted to its original name after 13 years of having called itself the United Arab Republic (UAR), as voters approved a new constitution in a referendum. From 1958 to 1961, Egypt and Syria were merged as the UAR, but Syria had departed the union on October 13, 1961.
- Nineteen black South African school children were killed when their school bus was struck by a truck in the town of Bronkhorstspruit, 50 miles (80 km) east of Pretoria.
- The Jordanian National Liberation Movement began operations with a bomb placed outside the security police building in Abdali (Amman). Two policemen were injured.
- Died: Nikita Khrushchev, 77, de facto leader of the Soviet Union as General Secretary of the Communist Party of the Soviet Union from 1953 until he was deposed in 1964, and de jure leader of the Soviet government from 1958 to 1964 as Chairman of the Council of Ministers. The Soviet government acknowledged Khrushchev's death two days later with a small obituary in Pravda and an announcement by the TASS agency that said "The Central Committee of the Soviet Communist party and the Council of Ministers of the U.S.S.R. announce with sorrow that on Sept. 11, 1971, after a severe and long illness, the former First Secretary of the Central Committee and the Chairman of the Council of Ministers, special pensioner Nikita Sergeyevich Khrushchev, died in his 78th year."

== September 12, 1971 (Sunday) ==
- The "Baker Street robbery" of £500,000 ($1,235,000) of cash from the Baker Street branch of Lloyds Bank in London, was completed by a gang of seven thieves who had burrowed into the bank vault after starting a tunnel from a vacant shop next door. Although police at Scotland Yard had been alerted by an alarm at 11:20 on Saturday night, and a ham radio operator had called police at 2:00 in the morning after picking up the conversations of the gang members from half a mile away, the Scotland Yard detectives waited until noon, after the radio transmissions had stopped to ask for outside assistance. British Post Office officials, who would have been able to provide radio-detector vans to trace locate the origin of the signals, criticized Scotland Yard for its handling of the investigation. Police, instead, checked all banks within a 10 miles (16 km) radius of the Marylebone area of London and discovered on Monday morning that the Baker Street branch had been robbed.
- TVA, the first French language television network in Canada, began broadcasting, initially on the Quebec TV stations CFTM in Montreal, CFCM in Quebec City and CJPM in Chicoutimi.
- A concert by Funkadelic was recorded, to be released 25 years later as Live: Meadowbrook, Rochester, Michigan – 12th September 1971.
- The Sigma experimental glider flew for the first time at Cranfield, UK.

== September 13, 1971 (Monday) ==
- Marshal Lin Biao of the People's Republic of China, the Vice Chairman of the Chinese Communist Party and Vice Premier, second in power only to Chairman Mao Zedong and designated since 1966 as Mao's successor, was killed in a plane crash, along with eight other people. According to the explanation given by the Chinese Communist Party, Lin and other plotters had been attempting to carry out Project 571, a coup d'etat that would have overthrown Mao and installed Lin as leader of the world's largest nation. Lin allegedly was attempting to flee the country after the failure of a coup and the Chinese government Trident 1-E jet in which he was riding crashed in Mongolia after running out of fuel. The Chinese government remained silent about Lin's disappearance, and intelligence reports would not reach the West for two months.
- The Attica Prison uprising ended with the deaths of 37 people— nine hostages and 28 prison inmates — after New York State Correction Commissioner Russell G. Oswald gave the order, after clearance from Governor Nelson Rockefeller, for the prison grounds to be retaken by law enforcement officers. At 9:46 in the morning, two National Guard CH-34 helicopters dropped tear gas into the yard of Cellblock D and at the order of State Bureau of Criminal Investigation Captain Henry Williams, a force of 1,000 drawn from the New York State Police, sheriffs' deputies from 16 counties, and prison guards charged. The day after the retaking of Attica, the State of New York revealed that all nine of the dead hostages had been killed by gunfire from the rescue team.
- A 200-vehicle pileup on the M6 motorway in England killed ten people and injured 70 more in the worst auto accident in British history up to that time. The accident happened when a thick fog enveloped the Thelwall Viaduct at Lymm, Warrington, and faster vehicles that sped into the fog crashed into slower-moving vehicles.
- Pope Paul VI decreed a revision of the Roman Catholic ritual of confirmation, with the requirement that the process (the conferring of "the fullness of privileges gained by baptism and of the grace that will provide strength for the profession of the faith") would be accompanied by the anointing the confirmand delivering the Latin phrase Accipe signaculum doni spiritus sancti ("Receive the sign of the gift of the Holy Spirit").
- Born: Goran Ivanišević, Croatian tennis player and the 2001 Wimbledon men's singles champion; in Split

== September 14, 1971 (Tuesday) ==
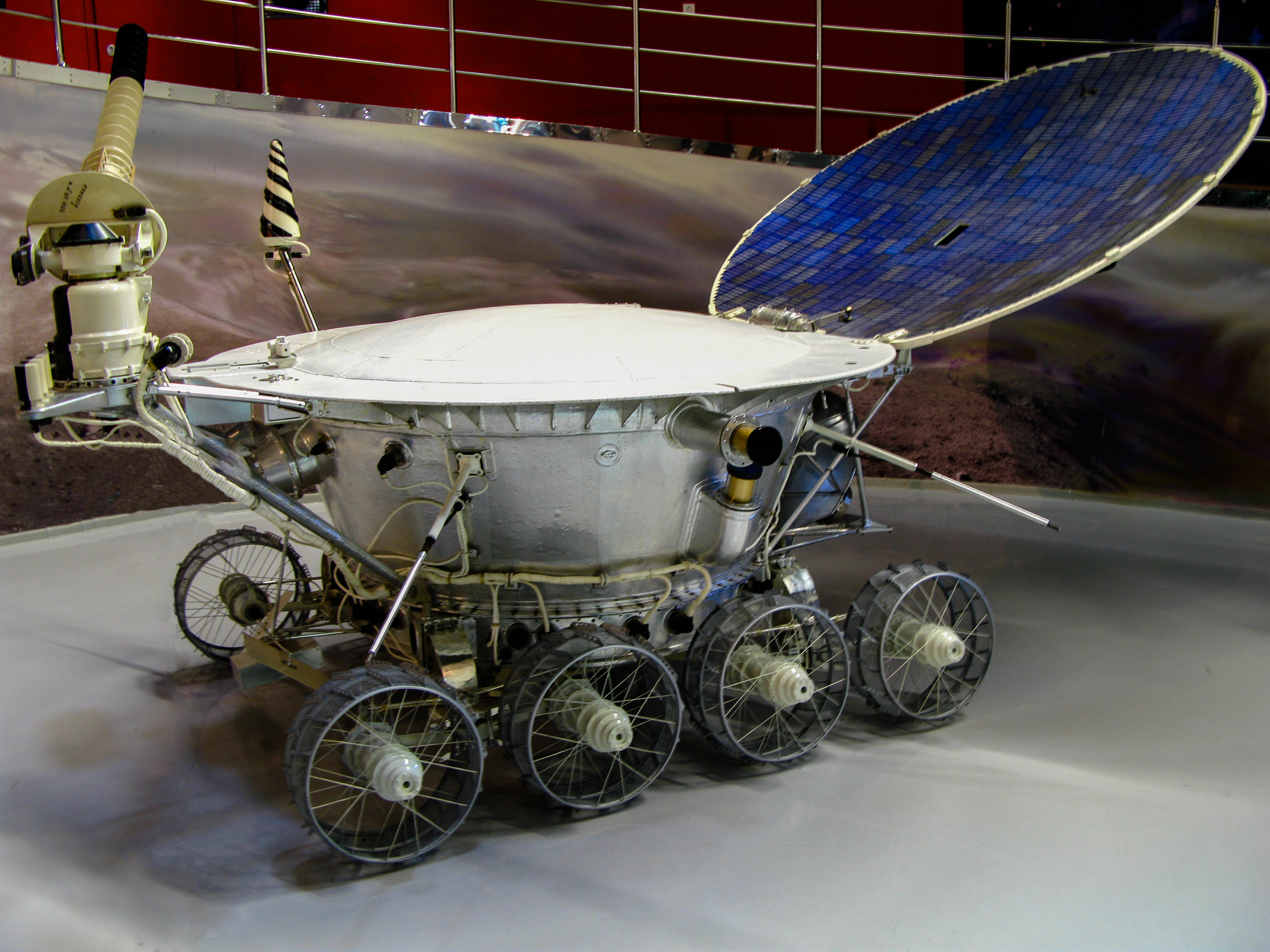
The Lunokhod 1 rover

- Transmission from the Soviet Union's lunar rover Lunokhod 1 ceased permanently, ten months after the mobile craft had made a soft-landing in the Mare Imbrium on November 17, 1970. The solar-powered transmitter had regularly shut down during periods of "lunar night", during the time that the lunar surface was dark during the new moon phase as seen from Earth, and then restarted when the rover was again in sunlight. After fruitless results in trying to re-establish contact, ground control in the USSR discontinued further attempts to get a return signal on October 4.
- Born: Siamak Namazi, Iranian-American businessman and detainee
- Died: Tarashankar Bandopadhyay, 73, Bengali novelist

== September 15, 1971 (Wednesday) ==
- Having successfully raised awareness for forest fire prevention through its cartoon character Smokey the Bear, the United States Forest Service introduced Woodsy Owl and the slogan "Give a hoot! Don't pollute" for its anti-pollution public service announcement advertisements.
- A group of 94 Roman Catholic Bishops and 151 priests, led by the Archbishop of Toledo, Cardinal Vicente Enrique y Tarancón, met in Madrid and approved 53 resolutions calling for the establishment of human freedoms and for social and economic justice, as well as for an end to the partnership between the Spanish Roman Catholic Church and the Government of Spain. Approval of the resolutions required a two-thirds majority, in a meeting unprecedented in Spain in its challenge to the dictatorship of Generalissimo Francisco Franco. In what one reporter called "perhaps the most dramatic and historically significant moment of the assembly", a majority of the clergy (though not two-thirds) voted in favor of a resolution that would have offered an apology by the Church for its actions during the Spanish Civil War in 1936.
- At least 15 people were killed and 57 injured in an explosion at a French-owned South Vietnamese nightclub in Saigon. While South Vietnamese police blamed the Communist Viet Cong for setting the bomb, some local business owners said that the bomb had been placed by South Vietnamese soldiers of the ARVN who were extorting "protection money" from the nightclub.
- Larry Yount became the only pitcher in Major League Baseball history to appear in the official record books without ever throwing a pitch to a batter. Yount was called to the mound as his Houston Astros were losing to the Atlanta Braves in the ninth inning, and was throwing the warmup pitches allowed for an incoming pitcher, but injured his elbow and was pulled back out of the game.

== September 16, 1971 (Thursday) ==
- All 49 people aboard Malév Flight 110 were killed as the Hungarian Tupolev Tu-134 airliner crashed approaching Kiev after its departure from Budapest.
- The publishers of Look magazine, a biweekly U.S. periodical with a combination of photos and text similar to the higher-circulation Life magazine, announced that the October 19, 1971 issue of Look would be the last after a run of almost 35 years. Gardner Cowles, chairman of the board of Cowles Communications, said that the publication lost five million dollars in advertising revenues in 1970 and had been operating at a loss for all of 1971.
- Three Japanese police officers were killed, 34 hospitalized, and about 110 others suffered minor injuries in student rioting associated with the "Sanrizuka Struggle", arising from the seizure of 2,663 acres (1,078 ha) or more than four square miles of farmland, and the eviction of its residents for construction of the Narita International Airport to serve as a second airport for Tokyo. An estimated 5,000 protesters and a slightly larger number of police clashed as the last six farms, totaling 35 acres (14 ha) were to be taken by force. In 1966, the Japanese government selected the site of the new airport as the land in Chiba Prefecture upon which the village of Sanrizuka sat. By 1970, all but six of the families remaining in the area had accepted a government buyout. The next day, a force of 1,200 riot police raided the headquarters of the different protest groups in search of suspects to be charged with murder, and seized control of the Narita airport site without further resistance.

== September 17, 1971 (Friday) ==
- ITV and ABC aired the first episode of The Persuaders!, starring Roger Moore and Tony Curtis.
- NBC aired the first episode of McMillan & Wife, starring Rock Hudson.
- Died: Carlos Lamarca, 33, Brazilian rebel, was ambushed and killed by the army along with fellow VPR member José Campos Barreto

== September 18, 1971 (Saturday) ==
- The South Sydney Rabbitohs defeated the St George Dragons, 16–10, to win the championship of the New South Wales rugby football league.
- Born: Lance Armstrong, American bicycle racer and cancer survivor who won seven consecutive Tour de France titles from 1999 to 2005, before having all of them revoked for using performance enhancing drugs; as Lance Edward Gunderson in Richardson, Texas

== September 19, 1971 (Sunday) ==
- Hurricane Irene–Olivia made landfall in Nicaragua. A total of 96 homes were destroyed, and 1,200 people were left homeless. The rainfall caused widespread flooding, killing three people in Rivas.
- The Canadian Grand Prix at Mosport Park was won by Jackie Stewart.
- The second New York City Marathon was held. Beth Bonner became the first woman in history to run a marathon in less than three hours, crossing the finish line in 2 hours, 55 minutes and 22 seconds. Norman Higgins won the overall race in a time of 2:22:54. In the same race,
- Born: Salman Shah (stage name for Shahriar Chowdhury Emon), Bangladesh film and television actor (committed suicide, 1996)
- Died: William F. Albright, 80, American archaeologist known for verifying the authenticity of the Dead Sea Scrolls

== September 20, 1971 (Monday) ==
- Romana Acosta Bañuelos was nominated by U.S. President Nixon to be Treasurer of the United States. On December 17, she would become the first Hispanic person to serve in the job.
- A spokesman for the U.S. Department of Defense, commonly known by its headquarters, The Pentagon, announced that the DOD would soon be declassifying most of the original 7,000 pages of the "Pentagon Papers" that had been leaked to the press in June, with redactions of secret information. The Pentagon had tried unsuccessfully to get a court injunction against publication of the material.
- Serial killer Randy Steven Kraft, who would become known as "The Scorecard Killer" after being found to have kept a journal of 61 murders, committed the first of at least 16 murders (and perhaps as many as 67). His first victim, Wayne Dukette, was a bartender at a gay bar in Sunset Beach, California. Dukette's body would not be found until 15 days later. Kraft's crimes would continue for almost 12 years until his arrest on May 14, 1983.
- Born: Henrik Larsson, Swedish footballer with 106 appearances for the Swedish National Team; in Helsingborg
- Died:
  - Giorgos Seferis (pen name for Georgios Seferiades), 71, Greek poet and Nobel Prize in Literature laureate
  - Louis Schweitzer, 72, Russian-born American industrialist and philanthropist, died while a passenger on the ocean liner SS France
  - Lionel Lindon, 66, American cinematographer and 1956 Academy Award winner
  - Reipas, 23, Finnish trotting horse

== September 21, 1971 (Tuesday) ==
- Elections were held in Denmark for the 179 seats of the unicameral parliament, the Folketing. The coalition of Radikale Venstre (Radical Liberals Party) of Prime Minister Hilmar Baunsgaard lost its control of the Folketing and Jens Otto Krag of the Socialdemokraterne (Social Democrats) formed a new government.
- The U.S. Senate voted, 55 to 30, to extend the draft of American men into the U.S. Armed Forces for an additional 18 months. Originally scheduled to expire at the end of the year, the conscription of 18-year-old males would continue until June 30, 1973. U.S. President Nixon, who had requested the additional draft, signed the bill into law a week later.
- The first interleague exhibition game between a National Basketball Association (NBA) team and an American Basketball Association (ABA) team was played, as the NBA champion Milwaukee Bucks defeated the host Dallas Chapparrals (who later became the San Antonio Spurs), 106 to 103.
- Irene Belletti of the Province of Udine in Italy was found murdered, with multiple stab wounds, the first of 14 women killed in the province over 17 years and possibly the first victim of "The Monster of Udine".
- Born:
  - David Phillip Vetter, American hospital patient who became known as "The Bubble Boy" because his severe combined immunodeficiency (SCID) syndrome prevented him from risking exposure to the outside world; in Houston (d. 1984)
  - Alfonso Ribeiro, American comedian, television actor known for Silver Spoons (1984-1987), The Fresh Prince of Bel-Air (1990-1996) and as host of America's Funniest Home Videos since 2015; in New York City
- Died:
  - Bernardo Houssay, 84, Argentine physiologist and 1947 Nobel Prize for Physiology or Medicine laureate for his discovery of the role of pituitary hormones in regulating blood sugar
  - Call Cobbs Jr., 60, American jazz pianist, was killed by a hit and run driver in the Bronx

== September 22, 1971 (Wednesday) ==
- The Seoul–Pyongyang hotline, the first telephone line between South Korea and North Korea, went into operation in order to allow communication between the Red Cross societies of both nations.
- The last Inter-Cities Fairs Cup Trophy Play-Off took place at Camp Nou; Barcelona defeated Leeds United 2–1.
- Born:
  - Princess Märtha Louise of Norway, the first child and only daughter of King Harald V of Norway; in Oslo
  - Chesney Hawkes, English singer and teen idol, in Slough
- Died: Edgar Whitehead, 66, former Prime Minister of Southern Rhodesia

== September 23, 1971 (Thursday) ==
- John Marshall Harlan became the second Associate Justice to retire from the U.S. Supreme Court because of illness, stepping down six days after Hugo Black had quit for the same reason. The departure of Harlan, the second justice of that name and a grandson of 19th-century justice John Marshall Harlan, left the Supreme Court with seven sitting justices less than two weeks before the Court was to start its new term.
- Born: Sean Spicer, American political commentator who served as White House Press Secretary for U.S. President Donald Trump for six months in 2017; in Manhasset, New York

== September 24, 1971 (Friday) ==
- The United Kingdom expelled 105 Soviet diplomatic officials and trade representatives whom they had learned were spies. Fifteen of the named persona non grata were out of the country at the time and were prohibited from re-entry and the other 90 were directed to leave within 24 hours. At the time, there were 550 officials in various Soviet diplomatic and trade missions in the UK. The British MI-5 intelligence agency had been alerted to the identity of the 105 members of the Soviet KGB and GRU espionage agencies by Soviet defector Oleg Lyalin. The expulsion marked the single biggest action taken against the Soviet Union by any western government up to that time.

== September 25, 1971 (Saturday) ==
- The U.S. Emergency Detention Act, part of the McCarran Internal Security Act of 1950, was repealed as the Non-Detention Act of 1971 was signed into law by U.S. President Nixon. The Emergency Detention Act had never been used in the 21 years of its existence
- The 30-member Senate of Ceylon met for the last time, bringing an end to the bicameral legislature that had operated in Ceylon (now Sri Lanka) since its independence in 1947. One week later, royal assent was given to the 8th Amendment to the 1947 Constitution, abolishing the Senate and leaving the 157-member House of Representatives as a unicameral parliament. Eight months later, a new constitution would change the nation's name and form of government and make the National State Assembly of the Republic of Sri Lanka the nation's unicameral parliament.
- The Victorian Football League Grand Final, championship of Australian rules football, was played before a crowd of 118,192 at the Melbourne Cricket Ground. The Hawthorn Hawks overcame a 20-point deficit in the fourth quarter to defeat the St Kilda Saints by one goal and one behind (7 points), 12.10 to 11.9 (or 82 to 75).
- In Australia, Derek Clayton won his third men's national marathon title, clocking 2:11:08.8 in Hobart.
- Died: Hugo Black, 85, Associate Justice of the U.S. Supreme Court since 1937, died eight days after announcing his retirement from the court.

== September 26, 1971 (Sunday) ==
- Popular Egyptian Arab Rashad al-Shawwa took office as Mayor of Gaza City after being appointed by the Israeli military government in the occupied Gaza Strip, after eight months of Israeli administration that followed the ouster of former mayor Ragheb el-Alami. The military governor, Brigadier General Yitzhak Pundak announced the selection of Shawwa in response to petitions signed by several thousand Arab residents of Gaza.
- Elections were held for half of the 566 seats of the Senate of France.
- "Freetown Christiania" (Fristaden Christiana), a commune, was founded in Copenhagen by squatters who took over a former Army of Denmark military barracks at Bådsmandsstræde.

== September 27, 1971 (Monday) ==
- Hirohito became the first reigning Emperor of Japan to go outside of that nation, departing from Tokyo on a chartered Japan Air Lines DC-8 jet at 9:32 in the morning local time (0032 UTC) for his flight to the United States and Elmendorf Air Force Base in Anchorage, Alaska. Because his flight crossed the International Date Line, Hirohito departed on Monday morning and, after a flight of 8 hours and 23 minutes, arrived on Sunday night in Anchorage at 10:45 local time (0845 UTC and 5:45 in the evening Tokyo time September 27), and was greeted by U.S. President Nixon. After the DC-8 was refueled, Hirohito departed Anchorage at 11:45 Sunday night local time (0945 UTC Monday) and flew to Denmark, arriving in Copenhagen at 6:15 p.m. Monday (1615 UTC). In 1921, Hirohito had become the first crown prince of Japan to travel to Europe.
- UK Prime Minister Edward Heath hosted a closed meeting with Irish Republic Prime Minister Jack Lynch and with Brian Faulkner, Prime Minister of the Northern Ireland province within the United Kingdom of Great Britain and Northern Ireland at Chequers, the official country residence near Ellesborough, Buckinghamshire of British prime ministers, where three men met for two days in a conference to attempt to resolve the crisis in Northern Ireland.
- Died: Wilhelm Simon, 71, convicted German war criminal and an administrator at the Buchenwald concentration camp and the Mittelbau-Dora concentration camp. After a nine-year imprisonment ending in 1954, Simon worked as a salesman and died in obscurity.

== September 28, 1971 (Tuesday) ==
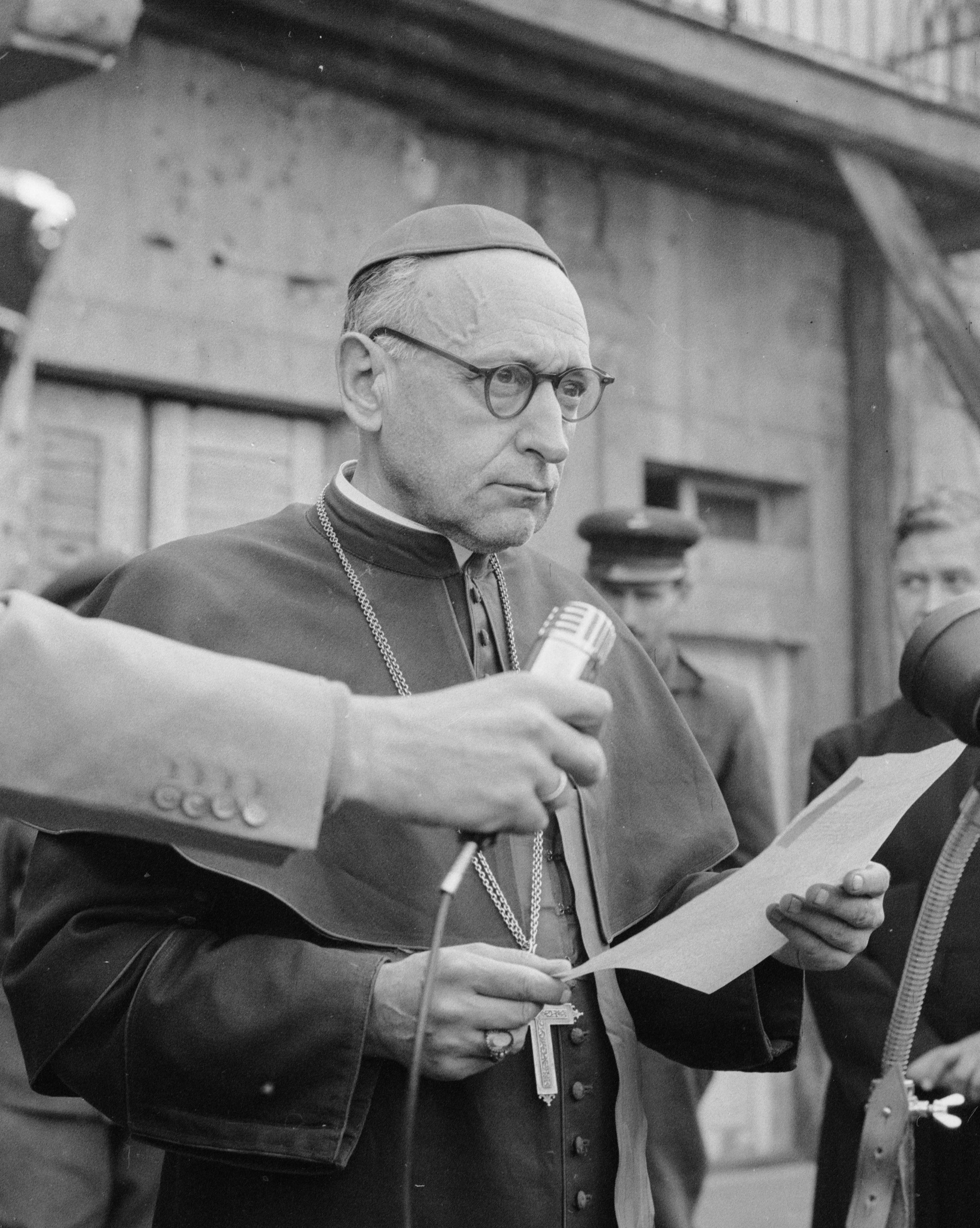
Cardinal Mindszenty

- Cardinal József Mindszenty, who had taken refuge in the U.S. Embassy in Budapest since 1956, was allowed to leave Hungary after almost 15 years.
- The Bangladesh Air Force began operation.
- All 32 people on Cruzeiro do Sul Flight 332 were killed when the Brazilian DC-3 airliner suffered an engine failure shortly after takeoff from Sena Madureira on its flight to Rio Branco.
- Dr. Amalia Fleming, a physician and the Greek-born widow of penicillin developer Alexander Fleming, was sentenced to 16 months incarceration by a military court in Athens, after confessing to being a part of a conspiracy to help a would-be assassin attempt an escape from prison. Born Amalia Koutsouri-Vourekas, Lady Fleming had retained her Greek citizenship after marriage, and took an interest in a plot to liberate Alexandros Panagoulis, who had attempted in 1968 to kill Greek premier George Papadopoulos. She would serve one month and then be deported to Britain.
- Died: Radivoj Uvalic, 59, a native of Serbia and an Assistant Secretary of State for Foreign Affairs in Yugoslavia, was killed in an automobile accident near the city of Gorgan in Iran. Uvalic, who had recently been reappointed as Yugoslavia's Ambassador to India, had decided to drive from Belgrade to New Delhi.

== September 29, 1971 (Wednesday) ==
- OSO 7, the seventh Orbiting Solar Observatory satellite, was launched.

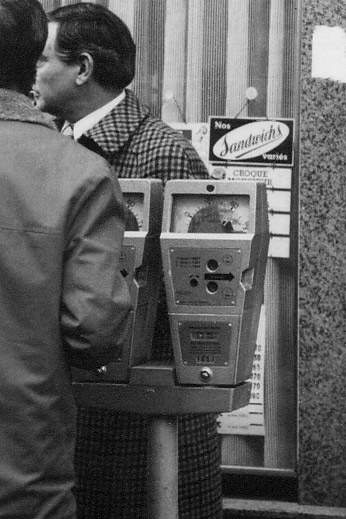
Un parcmètre français

- Parking meters were ordered installed in the city of Paris for the first time in its 1700-year history.
- Julio Hirschfeld Almada, Mexico's Federal Aviation Director and a millionaire industrialist, was released by kidnappers after his family paid a $240,000 ransom for his release.
- Elections were held in Spain for a portion of the seats in the symbolic Spanish unicameral parliament, the Cortes Españolas, the last during the autocratic reign of Generalissimo Francisco Franco. Four-fifths of the seats were "designated, directly or indirectly, by the authorities" but, 230 candidates were on the ballot for 104 available seats. The Cortes Españolas had only an advisory function, but no power over government spending, and the cabinet, appointed and dismissed by Franco alone, retained real legislative authority, but the 104 seats were considered "significant in being the only group in the regime that is democratically chosen.
- Died: George A. Garrett, 83, the first U.S. Ambassador to Ireland

== September 30, 1971 (Thursday) ==
- The Agreement on Measures to Reduce the Risk of Nuclear War was signed in Washington by U.S. Secretary of State William P. Rogers and Soviet Foreign Minister Andrei Gromyko, with the two nations agreeing to notify each other immediately in the event of an accidental, unauthorized or unexplained incident that could increase the risk of nuclear war. In addition to the agreement on averting nuclear war, Rogers and Gromyko also signed an agreement to modernize the Moscow–Washington hotline by adding two additional circuits connected to a satellite communications system, and teletype terminals to supplement the existing telephone.
- Japan's largest chemical company, Showa Denko, paid compensation equivalent to $810,000 to representatives of 77 victims of Niigata Minamata disease, caused by mercury poisoning from industrial waste that had been dumped by Showa Denko's insecticide factory, into the Agano River. The payment came a day after the Niigata District Court ruled in favor of the plaintiffs and the families of seven who had died, and Showa Denko declined to appeal. All of the victims had suffered poisoning after eating contaminated fish caught in the Agano River.

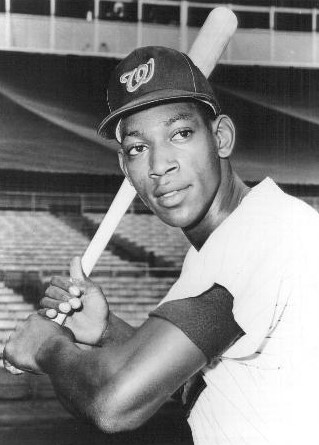
Paul Casanova, one of the last baseball Senators

- P. V. Narasimha Rao, who would later become the Prime Minister of India, was appointed to his first major executive job as the new Chief Minister of the state of Andhra Pradesh, India.
- The 65-story tall U.S. Steel Tower was dedicated in Pittsburgh as the U.S. city's tallest structure, standing 841 feet (256 m) high.
- The Washington Senators baseball team played their last game in Washington before their move to the Dallas-Fort Worth area to become the Texas Rangers. Thousands of fans entered the ground without paying, the security guards having left early, swelling the paid attendance of 14,460 to a paid and unpaid attendance of 25,000. With the Senators leading 7 to 5 and two outs in the top of the ninth inning, several hundred youths raided the field for souvenirs. One man stole first base, and umpire crew chief Jim Honochick declared the game a 9 to 0 forfeit to the New York Yankees.
