= November 1971 =

Month of 1971

<<	November 1971					>>
Su	Mo	Tu	We	Th	Fr	Sa
	1	2	3	4	5	6
7	8	9	10	11	12	13
14	15	16	17	18	19	20
21	22	23	24	25	26	27
28	29	30

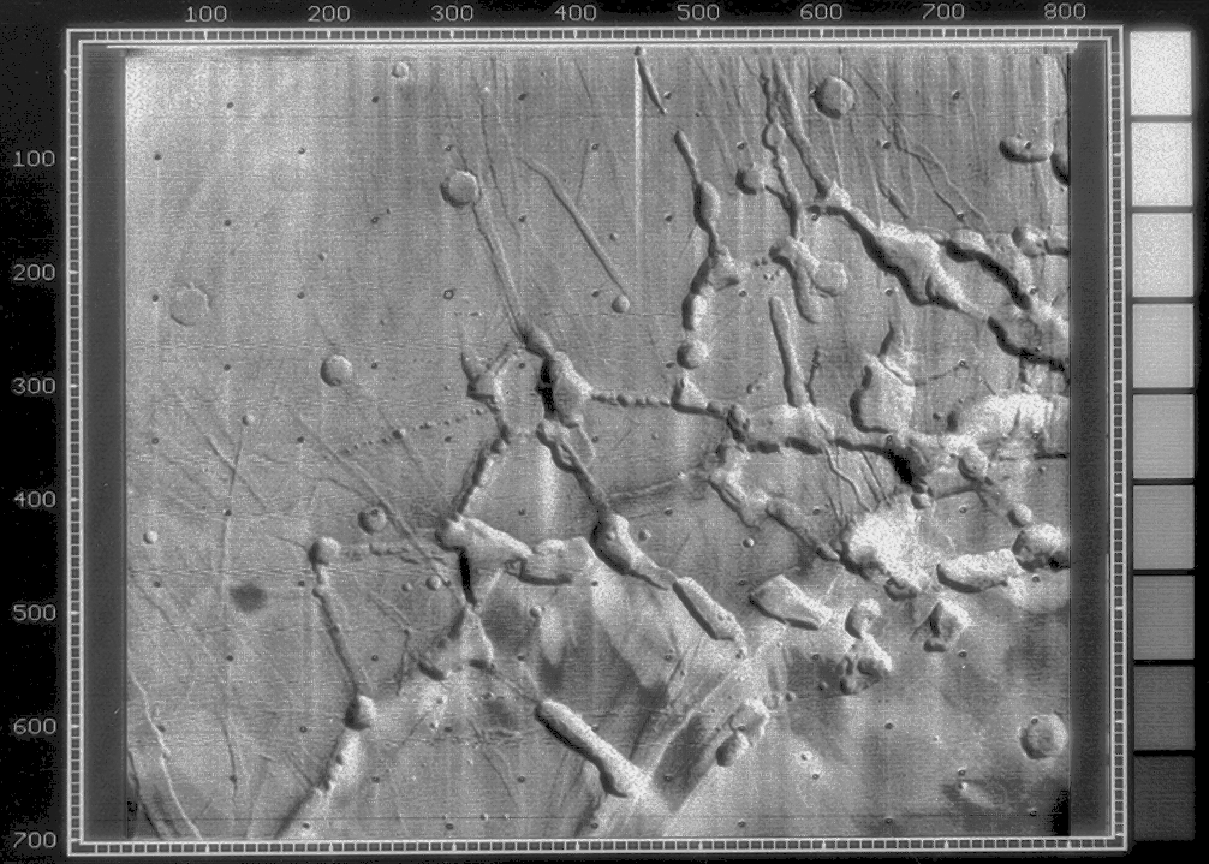
November 13, 1971: U.S. probe Mariner 9 becomes first Earth object to enter Mars Orbit, sends first detailed photos of terrain (pictured, Noctis Labyrinthus)

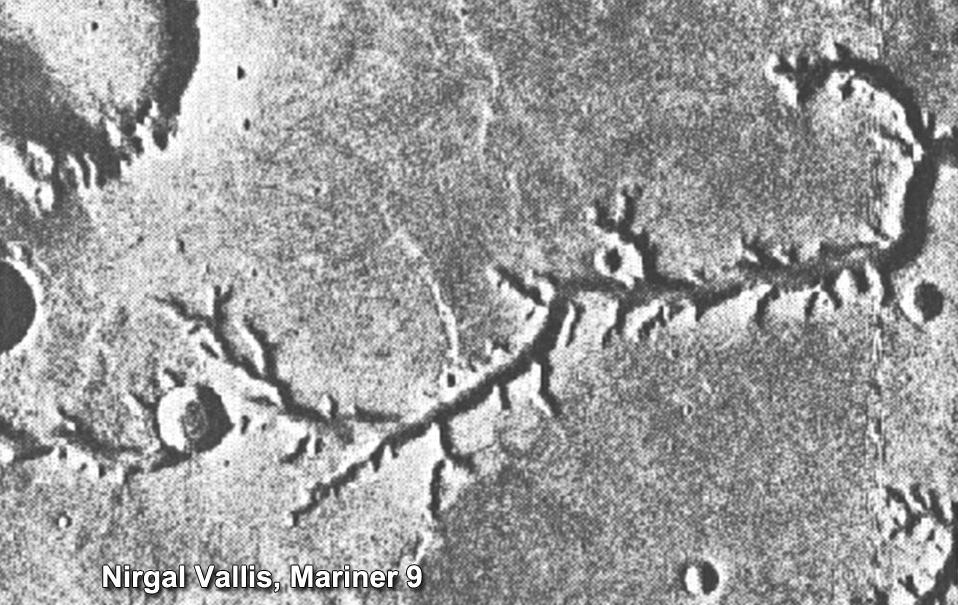
The dry river beds of Nirgal Vallis, seen from Mariner 9

The following events occurred in November 1971:

== November 1, 1971 (Monday) ==
- The planned launch of the World Hockey Association for the 1972–1973 professional hockey season, as a competitor to the National Hockey League, was announced in New York City by Dennis Murphy and Gary Davidson, who had created the American Basketball Association (ABA) as a rival to the NBA in 1967. The initial lineup of 10 franchises was announced as being in New York, Chicago, Los Angeles, San Francisco, St. Paul (Minnesota) and Dayton (Ohio) in the US; and Winnipeg, Edmonton and Calgary in Canada.

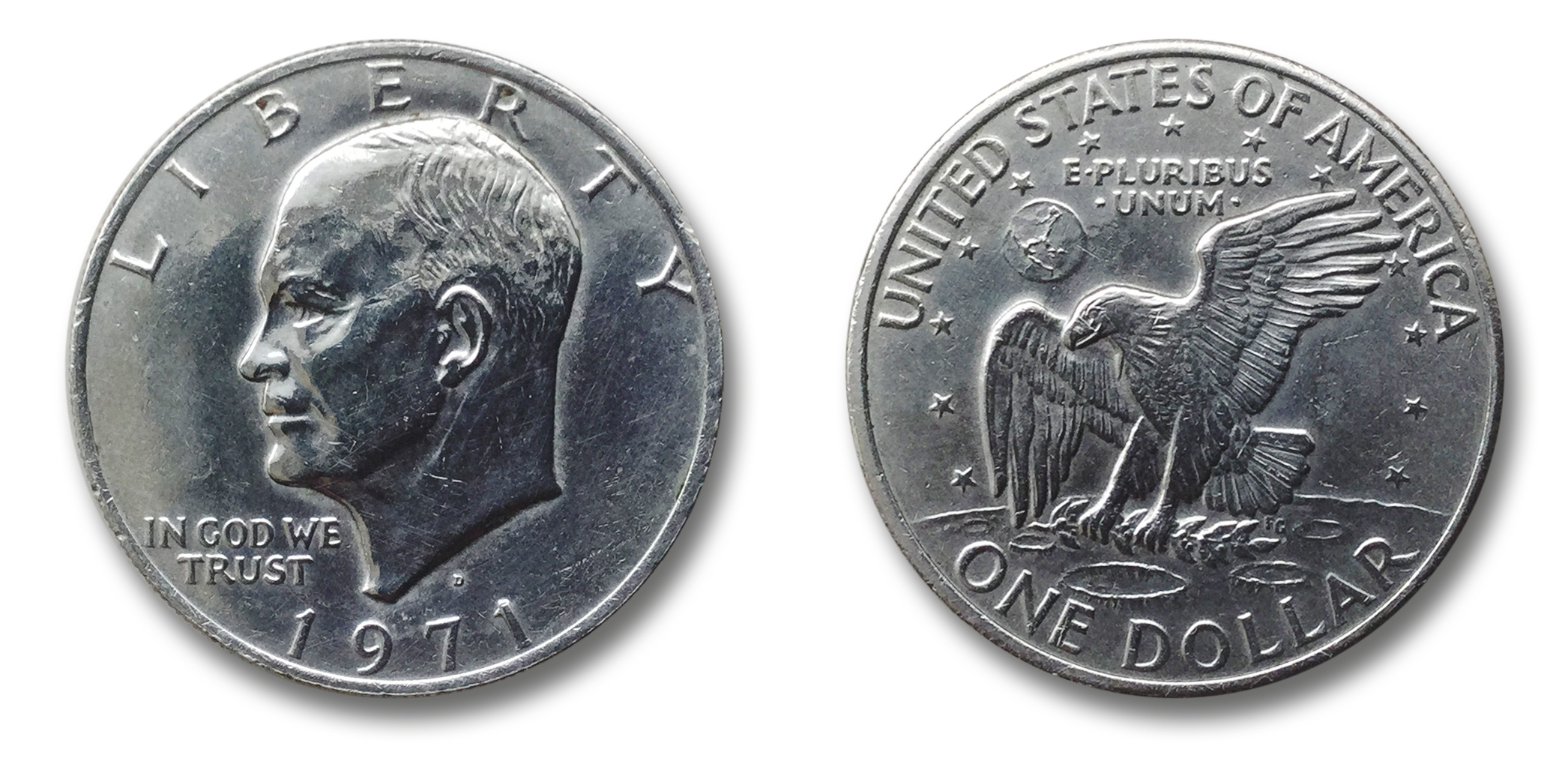
The 1971 Eisenhower dollar

- In the US, the Eisenhower dollar was made available to the general public for the first time by the United States Mint.
- Reverend Gonville ffrench-Beytagh, the Anglican Church's Dean of Johannesburg, was sentenced to five years imprisonment under South Africa's Terrorism Act for speaking out against the apartheid policies of South Africa's white-minority government. Free on bail while pursuing his appeal, ffrench-Beytagh, a coloured member of the Anglican clergy, was allowed to leave South Africa in April after his conviction was upheld.
- The Toronto Sun daily newspaper began publication in Canada, two days after the final issue of the Toronto Telegram.
- The Body Politic, Canada's first significant gay magazine, published its first issue.
- Born: Dennis King, Canadian politician, Premier of Prince Edward Island since 2019; in Georgetown, Prince Edward Island
- Died:
  - Mikhail Romm, 70, Russian film director;
  - A. Willis Robertson, 84, U.S. Senator for Virginia from 1946 to 1966, U.S. Representative 1933 to 1946, father of Pat Robertson
  - British-Burmese commercial diver Htun Minn, 36, died of an air embolism after making an uncontrolled ascent to the surface while conducting a surface-orientated hard-hat dive in the North Sea from the drill ship Glomar III. Minn's family would try for many years to prove negligence.

== November 2, 1971 (Tuesday) ==
- Professor Gerhard Herzberg of Canada was awarded the Nobel Prize in Chemistry for his research into the structure of the molecule, and Professor Dennis Gabor, a Hungarian-born British scientist, won the Nobel Prize in Physics for his invention of holography.
- The People's Republic of China, recently approved as the representative of the Chinese people in the United Nations, named its nine-member delegation to the UN, headed by its chief delegate, Qiao Guanhua (Chiao Kuan-hua).
- Off-year elections were held for governors and state legislators in the United States, and included the election for Governor of Mississippi, the first in that state in which an African-American challenged a white nominee. Bill Waller, the Democratic nominee, was a prosecutor who had unsuccessfully sought to convict the accused murder of civil rights activist Medgar Evers, and his independent challenger, James Charles Evers, was the brother of Medgar and the incumbent mayor of the primarily-black municipality of Fayette, Mississippi. There was no Republican nominee. Waller won overwhelmingly with over 75% of the vote in a race that had an unprecedented large turnout of black voters and white voters.

== November 3, 1971 (Wednesday) ==
- The first UNIX Programmer's Manual was published, originally to quickly bring in more users for the testing of the world's first portable programming system for the so-called Uniplexed Information and Computing Service ("unics") as an improvement on multics.
- Born: Unai Emery, Spanish footballer and coach; in Hondarribia
- Born: Dwight Yorke, Tobagonian footballer and coach; in Canaan

== November 4, 1971 (Thursday) ==
- Emma Groves, Irish mother of eleven, was hit in the face by a rubber bullet and blinded; she spent the rest of her life campaigning against the use of rubber bullets.
- Born: Lieutenant General Vladimer Chachibaia, Georgian military leader and former Chief of Georgian Defense Forces; in Tbilisi, Georgian SSR, USSR
- Died:
  - Guillermo León Valencia, 62, former President of Colombia, of a heart attack, during a visit to New York City
  - Ba Than, 76, Burmese surgeon, pathologist and hospital founder
  - Ann Pennington, 77, American stage and film actress and dancer, prominent in the 1920s

== November 5, 1971 (Friday) ==
- The first, and only, launch of the Europa-2 rocket by the European Launcher Development Organisation (ELDO) failed when the missile exploded two minutes and 41 seconds after liftoff from the ELDO launch site at Kourou in French Guiana. Electrical interference in the inertial guidance system for the rocket's third stage when it reached an altitude of 27,000 metres (89,000 ft) and the Europa-2 tilted, putting a strain on the second stage that ended in the explosion.
- The 24th Amendment to the Indian Constitution went into effect, giving the Indian Parliament the power to suspend the listed "Fundamental Rights" as deemed necessary.
- Born:
  - Jonny Greenwood, English musician and composer, in Oxford
  - Corin Nemec (stage name for Joseph Charles Nemec IV), American TV actor known for Parker Lewis Can't Lose and Stargate SG-1; in Little Rock, Arkansas

== November 6, 1971 (Saturday) ==
- The U.S. tested a thermonuclear warhead in Alaska at Amchitka Island, after federal courts denied a petition by environmentalists to prevent the test, code-named Project Cannikin. At around five megatons, it was the largest ever U.S. underground detonation. The test went ahead, as scheduled, as the U.S. Supreme Court voted, 4 to 3, not to allow an injunction for its postponement.
- Died: Spessard Holland, 79, former four-term U.S. Senator and wartime Governor of Florida from 1941 to 1945 of an apparent heart attack at his Bartow, Florida home. Holland sponsored the 24th amendment to the U.S. Constitution banning poll taxes in elections for federal office.

== November 7, 1971 (Sunday) ==
- Elections were held in Belgium for the 212 seats in the Chambre des représentants or Kamer van Volksvertegenwoordigers and the 106 seats of the Belgian Senate. The Flemish Christelijke Volkspartij, led by Prime Minister Gaston Eyskens, won a plurality of seats (40) and continued its coalition government with the Christian Social Party and the Belgian Socialist Party, both regional parties.
- Born: Robin Finck, American lead guitarist of Nine Inch Nails, in Park Ridge, New Jersey

== November 8, 1971 (Monday) ==
- The fourth best selling record album of all time the untitled fourth studio album of Led Zeppelin, was released, making its debut in the United States four days before its November 12 release in the United Kingdom, and contained the band's most popular song, "Stairway to Heaven".
- Elections were held for the Philippine Senate, and although the Nacionalista Party of President Ferdinand Marcos retained control of 16 of the 24 seats, the Liberal Party of Gerardo Roxas gained three to increase its share to eight seats. Jovito Salonga of the Liberals, who had been critically injured in the bombing of a Liberal Party rally on August 21, won 5.6 million votes, more than any other candidate.
- Berkeley, California, became the first "sanctuary city" in the United States, with the passage of an ordinance that prohibited its city employees, including its police, from enforcing federal arrest warrants for non-violent offenses. The "sanctuary city" concept was later adopted in other politically liberal communities in the U.S.
- The U.S. House of Representatives considered, but failed to pass, a proposed amendment to the United States Constitution that would have permitted voluntary prayer in public schools. The response to the 1963 U.S. Supreme Court decision in Abington School District v. Schempp, which had barred state-sanctioned Bible reading and prayer in non-private schools, the proposed 27th Amendment received 240 votes in favor and 162 against, but constitutional amendments required a two-thirds majority (268 of the 402 votes cast) to pass.
- Died: Robert "Bobbie" Brown, Jr., 68, U.S. Medal of Honor recipient for his bravery in the 1944 Battle of Crucifix Hill in Aachen during World War II, committed suicide with a single gunshot wound to the chest. Brown had been suffering from PTSD and constant pain from his war injuries for more than 27 years.

== November 9, 1971 (Tuesday) ==
- All 52 people on board a Royal Air Force Hercules C-130K air transport— the six-member British crew and 46 Italian Air Force paratroopers— were killed when their plane crashed during a NATO training mission.
- In Westfield, New Jersey, accountant John List murdered his mother, his wife and his three children. He would remain a fugitive for almost 18 years, working under a variety of aliases, before being captured in 1989 after the case was featured in a nationwide broadcast of the relatively new FOX Network show America's Most Wanted. List would remain in prison until his death in 2008 at the age of 82.
- The Bangladesh Navy was inaugurated with six patrol vessels.
- Born: Dimitris Kontopoulos, Greek songwriter, in Athens
- Died: Friedrich Günther, Prince of Schwarzburg, 70; the last member of the House of Schwarzburg

== November 10, 1971 (Wednesday) ==
- All 69 people on board were killed in the crash of a Vickers Viscount turboprop airplane operated by Merpati Nusantara Airlines in Indonesia. Carrying 62 passengers and seven crew, the airliner had taken off from Jakarta and was approaching its destination at Padang when it crashed into the sea.
- In Cambodia, Khmer Rouge forces attacked the Phnom Penh international airport, killing 44 people, mostly civilians who were members of families traveling with soldiers, wounding 30 others and damaging nine aircraft.
- Cuba's Premier, Fidel Castro, arrived to the only other Latin American nation where he was welcomed by the government, arriving in Santiago as the guest of Chile's Marxist President, Salvador Allende. The relationship between Cuba and Chile fueled the belief by U.S. President Nixon that, if either regime continued, "you will have in Latin America a red sandwich. And eventually, it will be all red."
- The U.S. Senate voted, 84 to 6, to ratify the Okinawa Reversion Agreement, returning the island of Okinawa, and other Japanese territory captured in 1945 during World War II, to Japanese control. The treaty, signed on June 17, provided that the United States would be able to maintain its military bases on Okinawa, but would not be able to launch military operations from the bases without consultation and approval by the Japanese government.
- Peru's military government, headed by General Juan Velasco Alvarado, issued the "General Telecommunications Law" by decree, requiring that the Republic of Peru be the owner of at least 51 percent of the shares of the South American nation's 19 television stations, and that the government have 25 percent ownership of its 222 radio stations.
- Born:
  - Mario Abdo Benítez, Paraguayan politician, President 2018–, in Asunción.
  - Niki Karimi, Iranian actress and director, in Tehran.

== November 11, 1971 (Thursday) ==
- A man-made earthslide at Kawasaki, Japan, killed fifteen people.
- Television reached Australia's Northern Territory for the first time at 5:00 in the afternoon, as NTD-9 began broadcasting from a station at Darwin as part of the Nine Network.
- Born: David DeLuise, American actor and director, in Burbank, California, the youngest son of Dom DeLuise and Carol Arthur.
- Died: A. P. Herbert, 81, English humorist.

== November 12, 1971 (Friday) ==
- All 43 passengers and five crew on Aeroflot Flight N-63 were killed when the Antonov An-24B airplane crashed while attempting to land at Vinnitsa after taking off from Kiev in a flight within the Ukrainian SSR.
- As part of the policy of Vietnamization, U.S. President Richard M. Nixon announced that 45,000 additional American troops would be removed from Vietnam by February 1.
- Mexico's research institute for astrophysics, optics, and electronics, the Instituto Nacional de Astrofísica, Óptica y Electrónica (INAOE), was created by presidential decree. It is now located at the site of the Tonantzintla Observatory, outside of San Andrés Cholula in Mexico's Puebla state.
- Died: Soichi Sunami, 86, Japanese-born American portrait photographer

== November 13, 1971 (Saturday) ==
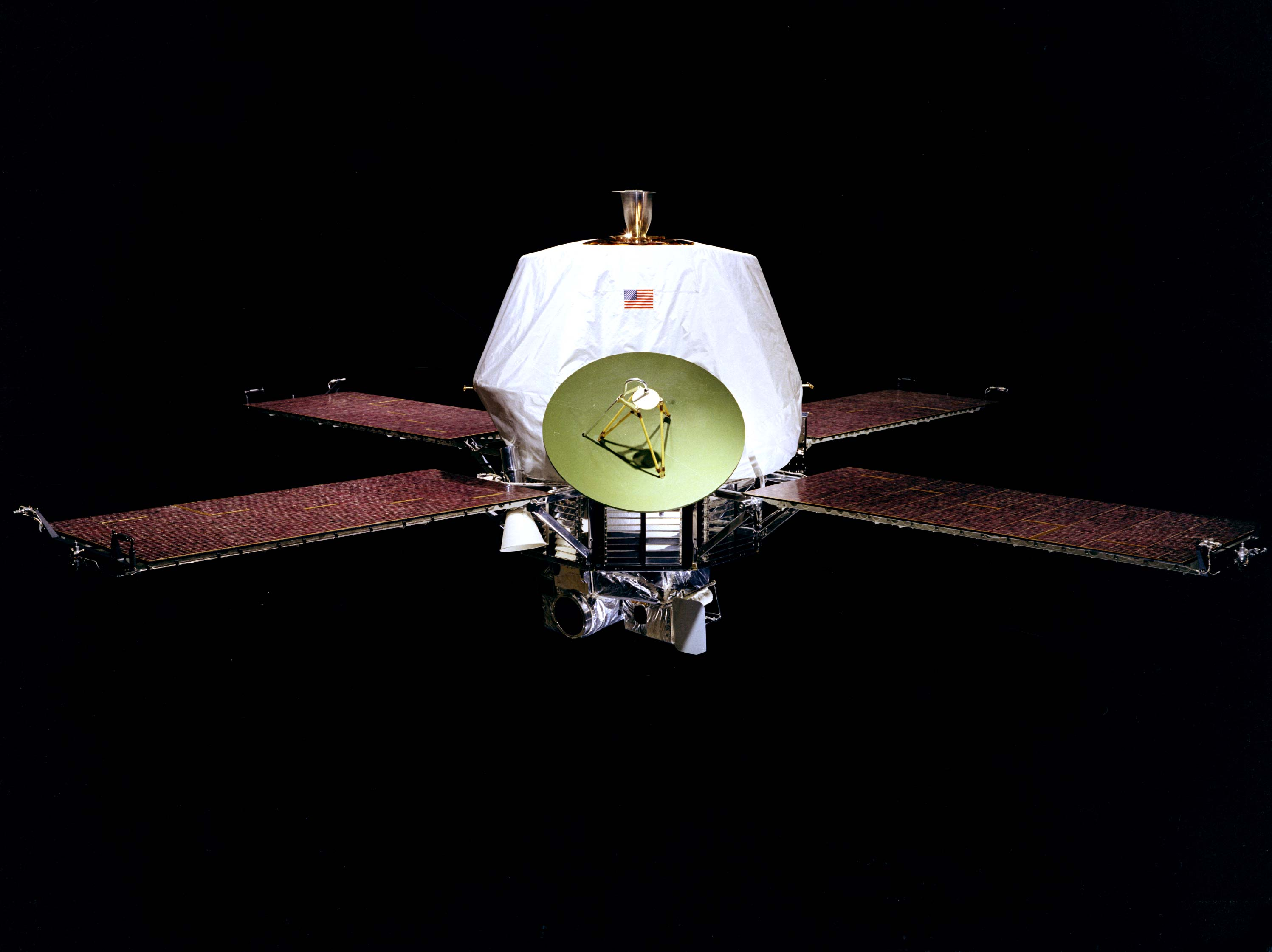
Mariner 9

- The U.S. probe Mariner 9 became the first spacecraft to successfully enter the orbit of Mars. Previous American and Soviet probes had made close "fly-by" approaches. At 4:42 p.m. California time (00:42 UTC on 14 November), the technicians at the Jet Propulsion Laboratory in Pasadena, California, made Mariner 9 the first object from Earth to be put into orbit around another planet. The elliptical orbit ranged between 800 miles (1,300 km) above the Martian surface and 10,700 miles (17,200 km) twice a day
- Greece and Albania restored full diplomatic relations and the Greek government dropped a 100-year-old claim it had had for what Greece called Northern Epirus and Albania called Toskëria. Incorporating 1,930 square miles (5,000 km^{2}) of the Albanian counties of Vlorë (Avlona) and Gjirokastër (Argyrokastro), the area had been captured from Greece by the Ottoman Empire, from which Albania was formed after World War I.
- U.S. President Nixon issued Executive Order 11627, the implementation of "Phase II" of the nationwide wage and price controls authorized by the Economic Stabilization Act of 1970. Controls against increases in wages, rents, prices on certain goods and services, would be ended by a subsequent order on January 11, 1973.
- Duel, one of the most successful of made-for-TV films produced in the U.S. for the ABC Movie of the Weekend program, was broadcast for the first time. The horror film was the first to be directed by Steven Spielberg and featured Dennis Weaver as a car driver pursued by the never-visible driver of a large gasoline truck. The TV version had a running time of 74 minutes punctuated by 16 minutes of commercials between 8:30 and 10:00 p.m.

== November 14, 1971 (Sunday) ==
- Pope Shenouda III of Alexandria was enthroned as the leader of the Coptic Christian Church and the 117th successor to Saint Mark. He would serve until his death on March 17, 2012.
- Elections were held in East Germany for the 434 directly elected seats in the 500-member Volkskammer. All 584 candidates had to be approved by East Germany's National Front, which was controlled by the Communist party, the Socialist Unity Party of Germany (SED), in a nominally multiparty contest in which the 434 persons receiving the highest number of votes were elected, and other candidates getting at least 5% of the votes were placed on a reserve list to fill vacancies.
- Born: Adam Gilchrist, Australian cricketer, in Bellingen, New South Wales
- Died: Paul Klinger, 64, German stage and film actor

== November 15, 1971 (Monday) ==
- Intel announced the world's first microprocessor, the Intel 4004.
- The International Organization of Space Communications (Intersputnik) was founded by scientist delegates from the Soviet Union and from seven Soviet allies (Poland, Czechoslovakia, East Germany, Hungary, Romania, Bulgaria, Mongolia, and Cuba) to cooperate on communications satellites, in the same manner as the western Intelsat organization.
- The People's Republic of China formally joined the United Nations after the October 25 vote in favor of its admission and the expulsion of Republic of China in Taiwan as the representative of China.
- Britain's Foreign Secretary Alec Douglas-Home arrived in Salisbury, capital of Rhodesia, to discuss proposals for a political settlement. Salisbury, Rhodesia would later be renamed Harare, Zimbabwe, after the white minority government yielded to black majority rule and economic disaster.
- Died: Rudolf Abel (William August Fisher), 68, English-born KGB spy for the Soviet Union who was convicted in the U.S. for smuggling American nuclear secrets to the Soviet government, and returned to the Soviets in 1962 in exchange for captured American pilot Francis Gary Powers.

== November 16, 1971 (Tuesday) ==
- The British Government committee of inquiry, chaired by Lord Parker, the Lord Chief Justice of England and charged to look into the legal and moral aspects of the use of the five techniques of interrogation in Northern Ireland, released its 72-page report. Although the Commission noted that prisoners arrested on August 9 had been subjected to sleep deprivation, a "bread and water" diet, "continuous and monotonous noise" and "hooded isolation", it noted that "Where we have concluded that physical ill-treatment took place, we are not making a finding of brutality. We consider that brutality is an inhuman or savage form of curelty. We do not think that happened here."
- Born: Waqar Younis, bowler for and captain of the Pakistan Test Cricket team and cricketer, in Burewala, Punjab province.
- Died: Edie Sedgwick, 28, American actress and associate of Andy Warhol, of a barbiturate overdose

== November 17, 1971 (Wednesday) ==
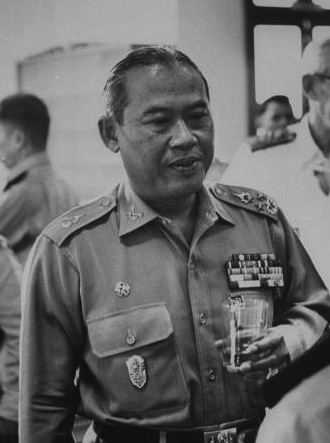
Kittikachorn

- Thailand's Prime Minister Thanom Kittikachorn, a Field Marshal in the Royal Thai Air Force, staged a coup d'état against his own government, dissolving the national parliament and his cabinet, including longtime Foreign Minister Thanat Khoman. A five-member "Revolutionary Council", headed by Kittikachorn, was created to replace the constitutional government, and the monarchy was maintained.
- Nine Irish Republican Army prisoners escaped the Crumlin Road Jail in Belfast, Northern Ireland, after rope ladders were thrown over the wall to them. Two Roman Catholic monks and several Belfast businessmen would later be charged with aiding the escape. Seven were able to flee across the border to Ireland, which allowed them to remain.
- Died:
  - Debaki Kumar Bose, 73, Indian film producer and director known for his innovations in Hindi and Bengali film
  - Gladys Cooper, 82, English stage, film and television character actress known for My Fair Lady and Now, Voyager.

== November 18, 1971 (Thursday) ==
- At a cafe in the town of Hestroff, the government of France began the first auction of the structures of the 40-year old Maginot Line that had been built in the 1930s along the border with Germany, finally disposing of what one journalist observed to be "an emblem of a false sense of security". The heavily fortified Maginot Line, designed to stop a German invasion, never saw battle after World War Two broke out in 1939. In 1940, the German Wehrmacht invaded France anyway, sweeping across the unfortified border with Belgium.
- Born:
  - Thérèse Coffey, British politician, Deputy Prime Minister of the United Kingdom, in Billinge, Merseyside
  - Jun Tanaka, U.S.-born Japanese-British chef and TV celebrity; in New York City
  - Pavel Žemlík, Czech Co-Founder of Smartmaps, later to be bought by Seznam.cz and become mapy.cz, Penzion na Pohoři hotel founder and owner, an important figure in Turnov orienteering club. A guest on Správným Směrem podcast (article about him on there)
- Died: Junior Parker, 39, blues musician, died during brain surgery

== November 19, 1971 (Friday) ==
- The Atomic Energy Commission (AEC) released its report of the November 6 nuclear detonation in Alaska of a five megaton thermonuclear weapon, and said that there was no radiation detected nor evidence of radioactive contamination to the environment of Amchitka Island. The AEC said that the explosive force of the $200 million test had created a concussion that killed "hundreds of fish... as well as 18 sea otters, four seals and 16 birds."

== November 20, 1971 (Saturday) ==
- In Brazil, 29 people were killed in the collapse of a bridge still under construction, the Elevado Engenheiro Freyssinet, when a 110 m (360 ft) section of the structure fell on traffic at the intersection of Paulo de Frontin Avenue and Haddock Lobo, in Rio de Janeiro. According to authorities, at least two buses and ten cars were crushed under thousands of tons of debris.
- The Cairngorm Plateau disaster, which ended in the deaths of five teenagers and an inexperienced adult guide during a mountain hike in Scotland, began with a weekend expedition into the mountains known as the Cairngorms, even with snow predicted. The teenagers, all 15 years old, were students at Ainslie Park School in Edinburgh
- Women from all over the U.S. marched in support of abortion rights in events in Washington D.C. and San Francisco. The marches were organized by a new organization, WONAAC, which had been created in July.
- Born: Joel McHale, American comedian and TV actor known for Community; to American parents in Rome.

== November 21, 1971 (Sunday) ==
- The Battle of Garibpur took place as the first major conflict between India and Pakistan prior to the Indo-Pakistani War that would end with Pakistan recognizing the independence of Bangladesh.
- At the same time, an aerial battle broke out between India and Pakistan over the Boyra peninsula.
- China Airlines Flight 825, a Caravelle III jet, crashed into the waters of the Taiwan Strait when it exploded in mid-air during a flight from Taipei to Hong Kong, killing all 25 people on board.
- After six days of negotiations, Prime Minister Ian Smith of Rhodesia signed a short-lived accord with British Foreign Secretary Alec Douglas-Home, to gradually end white-minority rule of the southern African nation.
- Born: Michael Strahan, American television journalist, TV show host, and NFL star inducted into the Pro Football Hall of Fame; in Houston

== November 22, 1971 (Monday) ==
- The U.S. and Honduras signed a treaty in the Honduran city of San Pedro Sula to return the U.S.-controlled and uninhabited Swan Islands to Honduras after 108 years. Located in the Gulf of Mexico about 100 miles (160 km) north of Honduras, the islands of Greater Swan and Lesser Swan, and a coral reef called the Bobby Cay, had been under U.S. sovereignty since 1863 and housed weather, navigation and communication stations. The islands, totaling 3 square miles (7.8 km^{2}) in area, are now referred to by the Spanish word for a swan, Islas de Cisne.
- The long-running nightly Australian TV news show A Current Affair, still on stations of the Nine Network 49 years later, made its debut as a local feature of the Melbourne Channel 9 station, GTV-9, with Mike Willesee as the first host.
- A clash in the Philippines between the Philippine Army and predominantly Muslim Moro insurgents took place on the day of a special election near the town of Magsaysay, Lanao del Norte. Thirty-seven Moros were killed and 43 wounded, while two Philippine soldiers were wounded. Another battle occurred at the city of Nunungan where seven Moros were killed after stealing ballot boxes.
- Six climbers died while attempting to scale Cairn Gorm in Scotland.
- Died: József Zakariás, 47, Hungarian footballer

== November 23, 1971 (Tuesday) ==
- An agreement was signed in London between a deputy minister of the British Ministry for Foreign and Commonwealth Affairs, Anthony Royle, and the Sultan of Brunei, Hassanal Bolkiah, providing for British recognition of Brunei's self-government regarding internal matters, and continuation of protectorate status in the matter of Brunei's foreign affairs and defence.
- Pakistan's President Yahya Khan declared a national emergency in an address to his country and told Pakistanis to prepare for a war with India. The action came a day after Indian Army troops crossed into East Pakistan to aid in an offensive by the Bangladesh guerrilla army."
- The People's Republic of China took the place of Taiwan as one of the five permanent members of the United Nations Security Council, after the seating of the PRC delegation on November 15.

== November 24, 1971 (Wednesday) ==
- During a severe thunderstorm over Washington, a man calling himself D. B. Cooper parachuted from Northwest Orient Airlines Flight 305, a Boeing 727 that he had hijacked, with US$200,000 in ransom money. He was never apprehended, and nearly 50 years later, the case would remain the only unsolved skyjacking in history.
- A Brussels court sentenced pretender Alexis Brimeyer, in absentia, to 18 months in jail for falsely using a title of Belgian nobility. Brimeyer had already fled to Greece.
- Rhodesian Prime Minister Ian Smith and British Foreign Secretary Alec Douglas-Home signed an agreement on proposals for a political settlement. Under the terms of the pact, the white minority government (in a nation with 250,000 white European and five million black African citizens) would retain its present power, but British economic sanctions would be lifted if the white government enacted legislation to outlaw racial discrimination, and the goal would be set for eventual black majority rule of Rhodesia (now Zimbabwe).
- Japan's parliament, the National Diet, ratified the terms of the 1971 Okinawa Reversion Agreement, signed on June 17.

== November 25, 1971 (Thursday) ==
- The #1 and #2 ranked teams in the United States, both undefeated after nine games and both in the Big Eight Conference, met in the most anticipated college football game of the year, as the #1 University of Nebraska Cornhuskers visited the #2 University of Oklahoma Sooners. Trailing, 31 to 28 with less than two minutes to play, Nebraska scored the winning touchdown with 1:38 left in the game and winning 35–31. The Cornhuskers would go on to win recognition as the NCAA national champions in another #1 vs. #2 game, beating second-ranked Alabama at the Orange Bowl on New Year's Day.
- British Prime Minister Harold Wilson presented a plan to the House of Commons for an eventual union of the Republic of Ireland and the British region of Northern Ireland that could take effect as early as the year 1987, starting with the formation of a commission composed of British, Northern Irish and Irish members to frame a constitution for united Ireland, to come into effect 15 years after all three parliaments ratified the instrument. Northern Irish Prime Minister Brian Faulkner rejected the plan the next day, declaring that although he would welcome dialogue with the Republic of Ireland, he would not consider weakening his region within the United Kingdom.
- Born:
  - Christina Applegate, American television and film actress, known primarily for the TV show Married With Children; in Hollywood, California to record producer Robert W. Applegate and soap opera actress Nancy Priddy
  - Dražen Erdemović, Bosnian war criminal, in Tuzla
- Died: Leonard W. Murray, 75, Canadian naval commander

== November 26, 1971 (Friday) ==
- Two days of elections were held in Czechoslovakia for the 200 seats of the lower house of the Federal Assembly, the Chamber of the People (Sněmovna lidu Czech or Snemovňa ľudu Slovak). Voters were limited to approving or disapproving the pre-approved slate of 200 candidates endorsed by the Communist Party of Czechoslovakia.
- For the first time since the founding of the modern state of Israel in 1948, Muslim Israeli citizens were given permission to come to Mecca in Saudi Arabia for the Hajj, the pilgrimage to Islam's holiest city, held annually. The decision was announced in a letter from King Faisal II of Sauid Arabia to the Palestinian Mayor of Hebron in the West Bank, occupied by Israel since 1967. At the time, about 325,000 of Israel's three million citizens were Muslim. The decision affected the upcoming Hajj starting January 22, 1972, corresponding to the 8th day of the month of Dhu al-Hijjah, 1391 A.H. on the Muslim calendar.
- A ban against "caning" of students, used as a form of corporal punishment to enforce discipline in British schools since the early 19th century, was ordered by the Inner London Education Authority for the 880 primary schools in London, but was not scheduled to go into effect until January 1, 1973, 13 months in the future at the time. The punishment typically was administered by a teacher, with a long stick made of rattan to an unruly student, generally hitting the recipient across the buttocks.
- East Germany's parliament, the Volkskammer, unanimously re-elected former Communist Party Chairman Walter Ulbricht as the nation's nominal head of state, and Willi Stoph as the head of government.
- Died:
  - Giacomo Alberione, 87, Italian priest, founder of the Society of St. Paul and the Daughters of St. Paul;
  - Bengt Ekerot, 51, Swedish actor, best known for his role as Death in Ingmar Bergman's The Seventh Seal
  - Palwankar Vithal, Indian cricketer

== November 27, 1971 (Saturday) ==
- The lander of the USSR's Mars 2 probe, became the first man-made object to reach the surface of Mars, but was destroyed on impact because its parachute failed to deploy due to a computer malfunction. The orbiter, launched with the lander on May 19, would continue in Martian orbit and transmit data for eight months before being deactivated on August 22, 1972.

== November 28, 1971 (Sunday) ==
- Thirty-four members of the U.S. Army's 101st Airborne Division were killed in the crash of a CH-47 Chinook helicopter in South Vietnam, when the aircraft impacted the western slope of Mum Kun Sac Mountain near Phu Loc. The wreckage would not be discovered until December 2nd.
- Presidential and congressional elections were held in Uruguay. Under an electoral system where the party whose presidential candidates received the most votes would win the presidency, Juan María Bordaberry was the president-elect. Thus, although Wilson Ferreira Aldunate of the National Party won 60,000 more votes than Bordaberry's Colorado Party, the Colorado Party's five candidates won 681,624 votes while the National's two candidates won 668,822. The Colorado Party had a 41 to 40 edge in the 100-seat Chamber of Deputies, and a 13 to 12 lead in the 30 seat Senate.
- Pakistan launched its first direct assault against India in the latest war between the two nations, killing at least 20 people and injuring 70 in the city of Balurghat in the West Bengal state, near the border with East Pakistan. The Pakistani Army fired artillery shells from their side of the border, at least three miles (about two kilometers) away from the target area. Eight of the shells fell on crowded areas of the city during the morning.
- Died: Wasfi al-Tal, 52, Prime Minister of Jordan, He was assassinated by members of the Palestinian terrorist group Black September while standing on the steps of the Sheraton Hotel in Cairo, while attending an Arab League summit meeting in Egypt. Tal and Jordan's Foreign Minister Abdullah Salah were returning to their hotel after a meeting with the joint defense council of the Arab League, where the member nations had been discussing strategy against Israel, when three members of the Palestinian guerrilla group Black September ran toward them from the hotel lobby and began firing with revolvers.

== November 29, 1971 (Monday) ==
- For the first time since the founding of the Swiss Confederation in 1291, Switzerland's national parliament had female members, as 10 women were sworn into office in the National Council, and one took the office in the Council of State.
- The Computerized Criminal History (CCH) program of the U.S. Federal Bureau of Investigation (FBI) began operations as an opportunity for individual states to enter an individual's criminal history into a national database to be linked to the existing NCIC.
- The Soviet Union launched the satellites Kosmos 458 and Kosmos 459 from Plesetsk Cosmodrome Site 133.
- The Soviet Union performed a nuclear test at its Semipalatinsk Test Site.
- Died: Edith Tolkien (née Bratt), 82, English wife of J. R. R. Tolkien

== November 30, 1971 (Tuesday) ==
- A gunbattle killed four policemen and three Iranian Marines in a fight between Iran and the United Arab Emirates over ownership of a set of islands in the Persian Gulf, Abu Musa, Greater Tunb and Lesser Tunb. The fight came one day after Iran and one of the emirates, Sharjah, had signed an agreement to allow both nations to maintain a presence on the island. Iran has retained control of the islands ever since.
- The Sandy's hamburger restaurant chain, with franchises in Illinois, Iowa and other U.S. Midwestern states and operating since 1956, was acquired by the Hardee's restaurant chain based in the South and founded in 1960.
- Pakistan's President Yahya Khan and the armed forces made the ultimately disastrous decision to launch Operation Chengiz Khan, an airstrike against India and its airbases near the border with East Pakistan, to take place on December 3. At the same time, India's Prime Minister Indira Gandhi publicly called on Yahya Khan to pull all Pakistani Army troops from East Pakistan as "a gesture for peace".
- The finance ministers and central bank governors of ten non-Communist nations began discussions at Rome to negotiate a realignment of the national currencies of all 10 states. The "Group of 10" sent representatives for the U.S., Canada, the U.K., Sweden, Japan, France, West Germany, Italy, Belgium and the Netherlands. U.S. Treasury Secretary John B. Connally appeared as the American finance minister.
- Died: Fred Quilt, a 55-year-old leader of the Tsilhqot'in First Nation, two days after being fatally injured in the course of his arrest by the Royal Canadian Mounted Police, which initially pulled him over for drunk driving. Quilt died two days later and the Fred Quilt inquiry followed.
