= Yves de la Casinière =

French musician, composer and music educator

Yves-Marie Chiron de la Casinière (11 February 1897 – 26 October 1971) was a French musician, composer and music educator.

== Life ==
Born in Angers, la Casinière studied with Nadia Boulanger at the École Normale de Musique de Paris and with Max d'Ollone and Georges Caussade at the Conservatoire de Paris. In 1925 he won the first Second Grand Prix de Rome with the cantata La mort d'Adonis. He worked as general inspector of the city of Paris for music lessons.

In addition to his compositions, including symphonic works, instrumental concertos and chamber music, de la Casinière wrote several music pedagogical writings.

La Casinière died in Paris on 26 October 1971.

== Works ==
- Hercule et les Centaures, symphonic poem, 1920
- Symphonie pour piano et orchestre, 1922
- Béatrix, cantata, 1923
- Les Amants de Vérone, cantata, 1924
- Sonatine for piano and cello, 1924
- La mort d’Adonis, cantata, 1925
- Persée et Andromède, symphonic poem
- Au clair de lune, song, poem by Aïda de Romain (éditions Maurice Sénart) 1923.
- La P'tite Lili, film score, 1927
- Sonatine for piano and violin, 1941
- Quatuor avec piano, 1942
- Trio avec piano, 1944
- 7 Petites pièces très faciles pour clarinette for piano, 1956
- Berceuse for oboe and piano, 1957
- Thème varié for trumpet and piano, 1958
- Concerto for pipe organ and orchestra, 1958
- Études pour piano
- Le Cheval, song, poem by Maurice Rostand (éditions Maurice Sénart) , 1923

== Bibliography ==
He published several teaching books on music theory and piano learning studies.

- La Musique des origines A nos jours, Éditions Larousse, Paris 1946,
- Initiation à la lecture et à la dictée de la musique, 1958
- 25 minutes de travail pianistique et du disque, 1958
- La technique du clavier par l'image, méthode de piano, 1958
- La lecture musicale, série d'exercices progressifs ou complémentaires avec ou sans accompagnement de piano, 1958
