= January 1972 =

Month of 1972

<<	January 1972					>>
Su	Mo	Tu	We	Th	Fr	Sa
						1
2	3	4	5	6	7	8
9	10	11	12	13	14	15
16	17	18	19	20	21	22
23	24	25	26	27	28	29
30	31

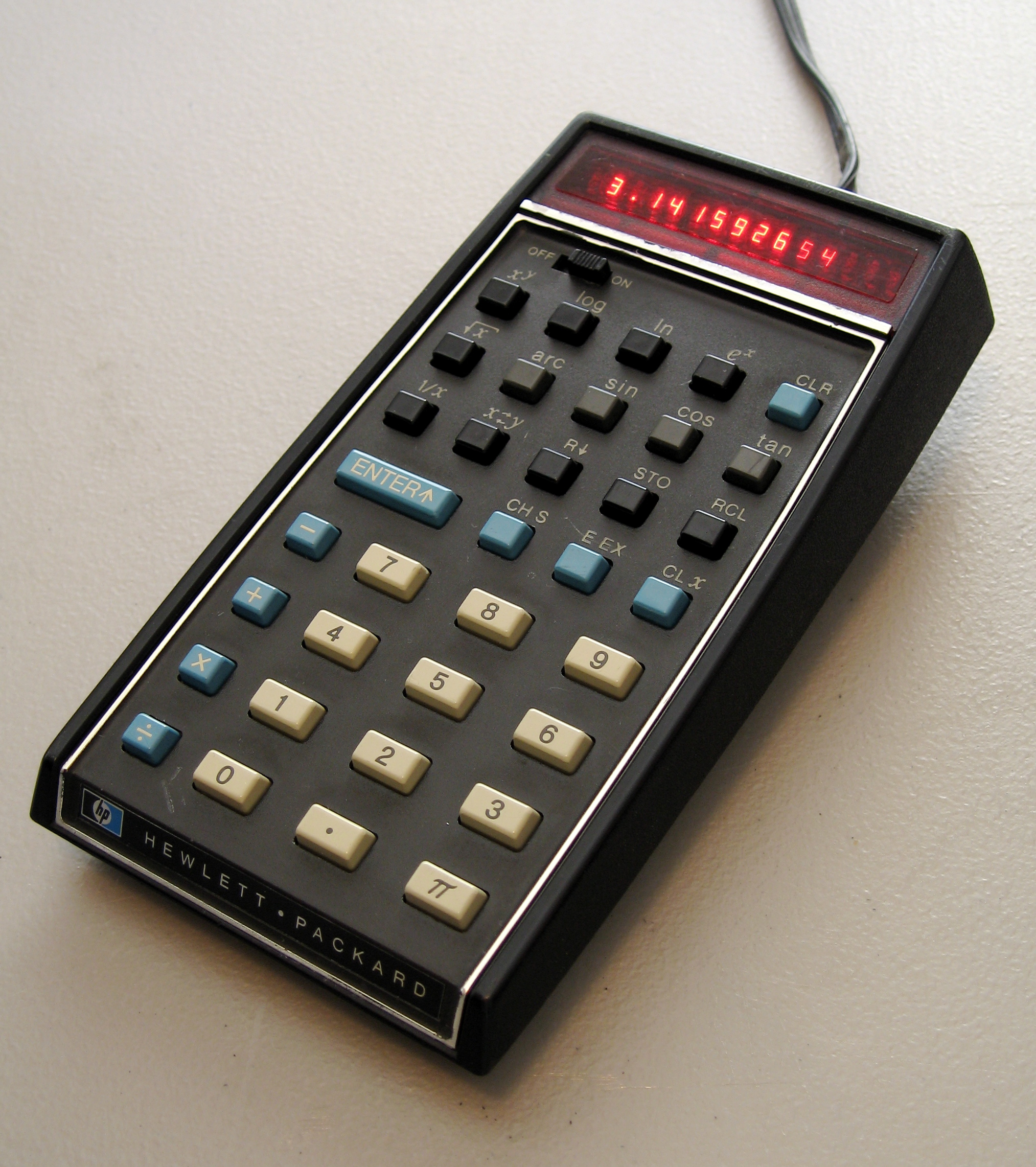
January 4, 1972: HP-35 pocket calculator introduced

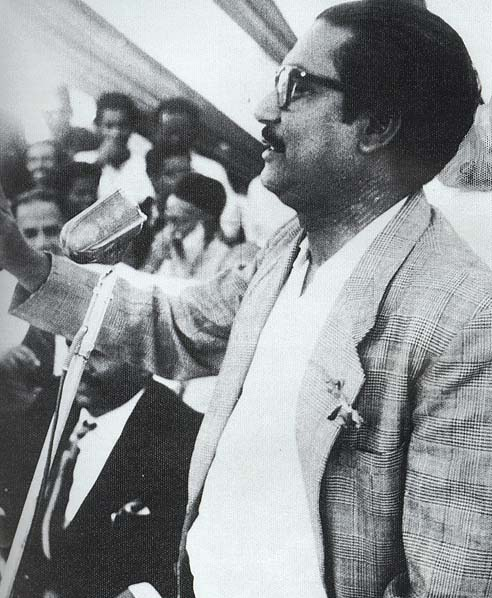
January 10, 1972: Sheikh Mujibur Rahman is released from Pakistani prison and becomes prime minister of the new nation of Bangladesh

January 27, 1972: Home video game system introduced by Magnavox

The following events occurred in January 1972:

== January 1, 1972 (Saturday) ==
- Kurt Waldheim of Austria became the fourth Secretary General of the United Nations, succeeding U Thant. Waldheim served two five-year terms. It would only be after he became President of Austria in 1986 that the world would learn that Waldheim had been a Nazi officer being investigated by the UN War Crimes Commission.
- In a match between the two highest ranked college football teams in the United States, the Number 1 Nebraska Cornhuskers beat the Number 2 Alabama Crimson Tide in the Orange Bowl, 38–6, to clinch the mythical national college football championship determined by polls taken by the Associated Press and by United Press International.
- Born:
  - Barron Miles, CFL star, in Roselle, New Jersey
  - Lilian Thuram, French soccer football star, in Pointe-à-Pitre, Guadeloupe
- Died: Maurice Chevalier, 83, French actor and singer

== January 2, 1972 (Sunday) ==
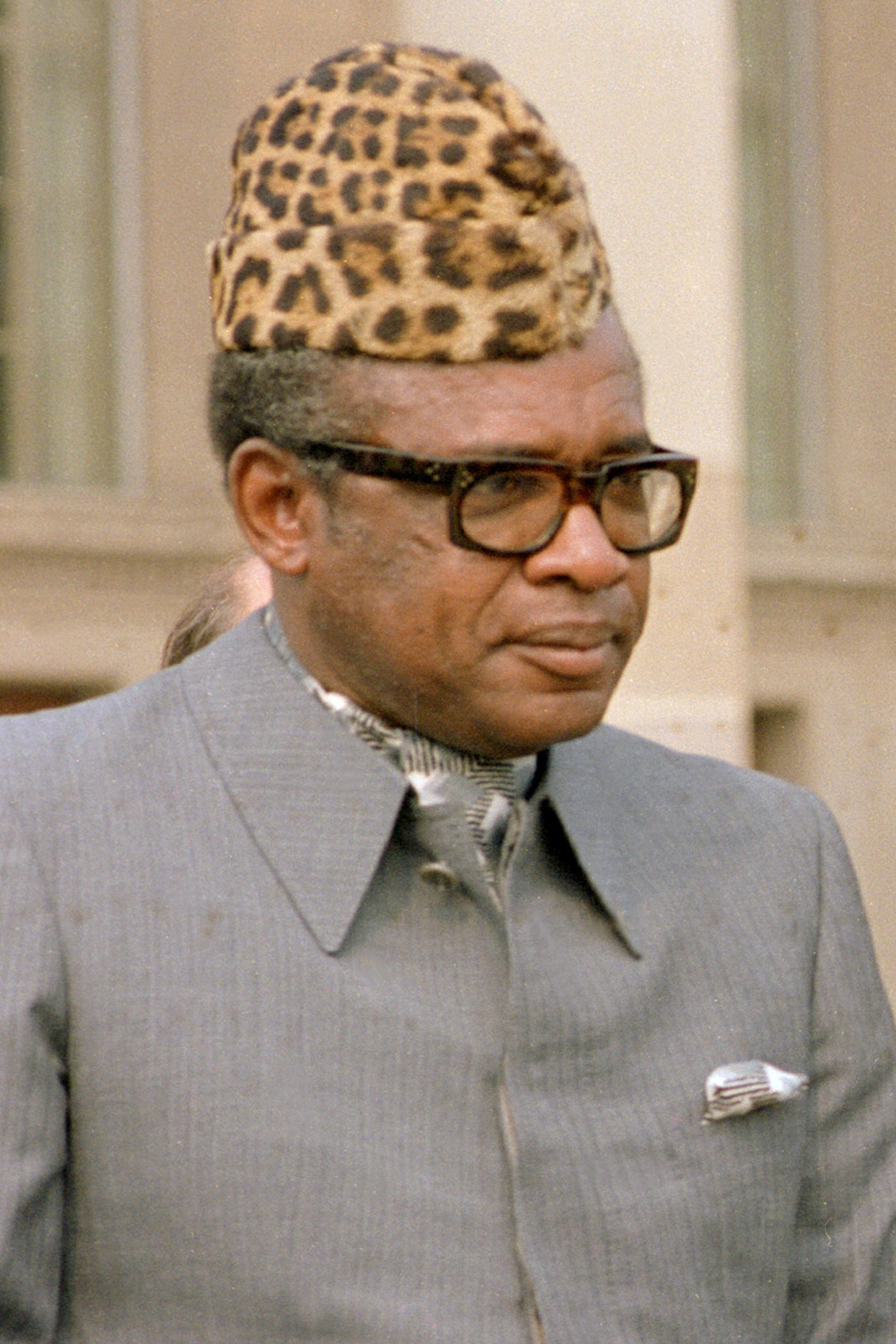
Mobutu Sese Seko, formerly Joseph Mobutu

- Mobutu Sese Seko, the President of Zaire, announced his new campaign, "Authenticité", to remove all traces of the former Belgian Congo's colonial past in favor of "Africanized" names, customs and dress. Having changed his own name from Joseph-Desire Mobutu, the President required citizens with European-sounding names to change them to something more authentic.

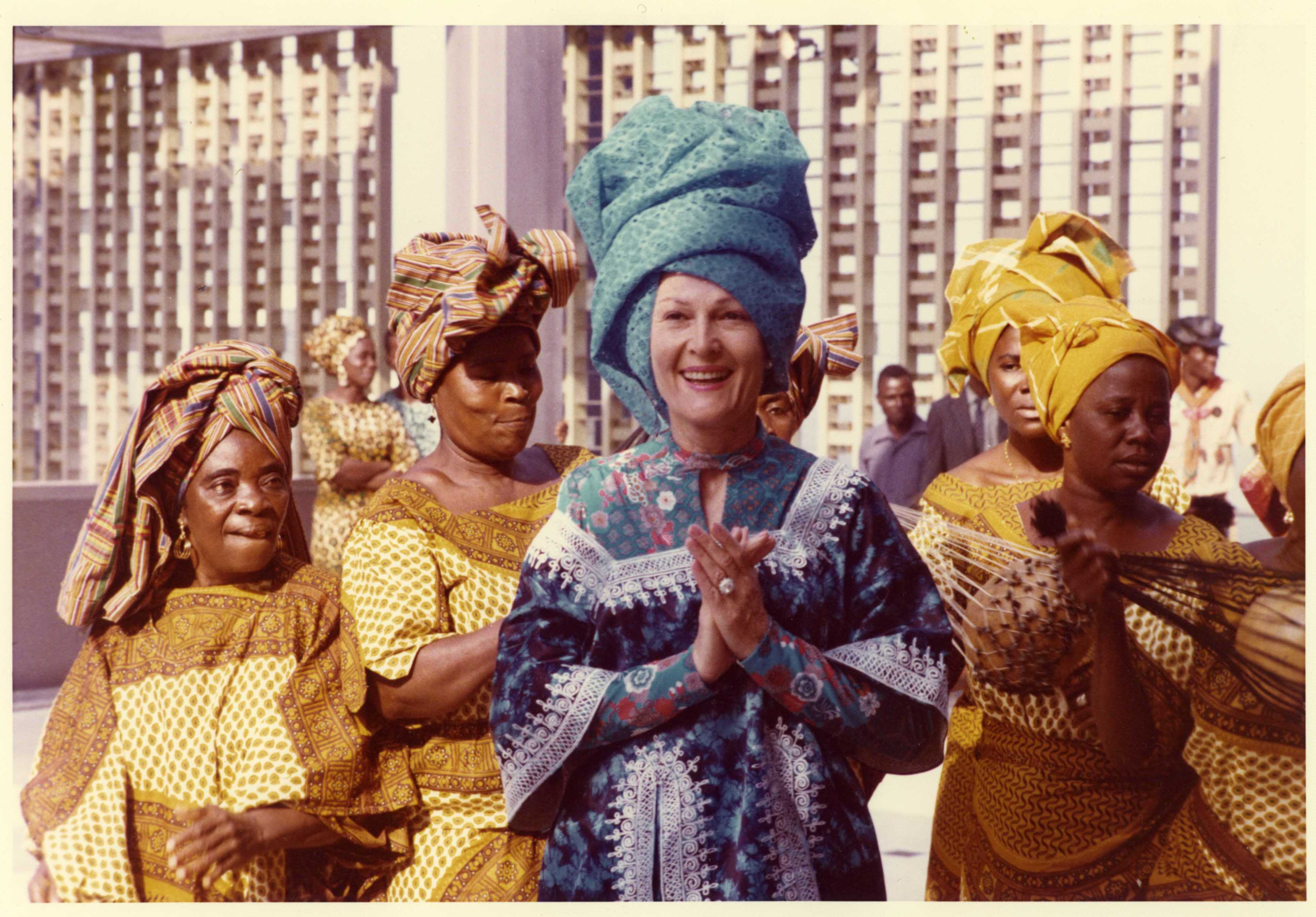
U.S. First Lady Pat Nixon

- U.S. First Lady Pat Nixon arrived in Liberia for the beginning of an 8-day tour of Africa, which also included Ghana and Côte d'Ivoire.
- A group of six men stole $4,000,000 worth of jewelry in the Pierre Hotel Robbery, from safe deposit boxes at the New York luxury hotel. After being tipped off by an informant, the FBI captured the robbers, but recovered only one million of the loot.
- Juliane Koepcke, the sole survivor of the Christmas Eve crash of LANSA Flight 508, was found alive by three hunters deep inside the Amazon jungle in Peru. The only survivor of 93 people on the plane, she had followed a stream for nine days until finding help.
- Serial killer John Wayne Gacy committed the first of at least 33 murders at his home in Norwood Park Township, Illinois, a suburb of Chicago. Gacy approached 16-year-old Timothy McCoy at the Greyhound bus terminal in Chicago and took him to the Gacy home, where he stabbed McCoy to death in the early hours of January 3. Gacy then buried McCoy's body under the crawlspace. McCoy remained unidentified until May 1986.
- Born: Álvaro Díaz González, Chilean journalist and director, in Santiago.
- Died: Lillian Gilbreth, 93, efficiency expert and heroine of Cheaper by the Dozen

== January 3, 1972 (Monday) ==
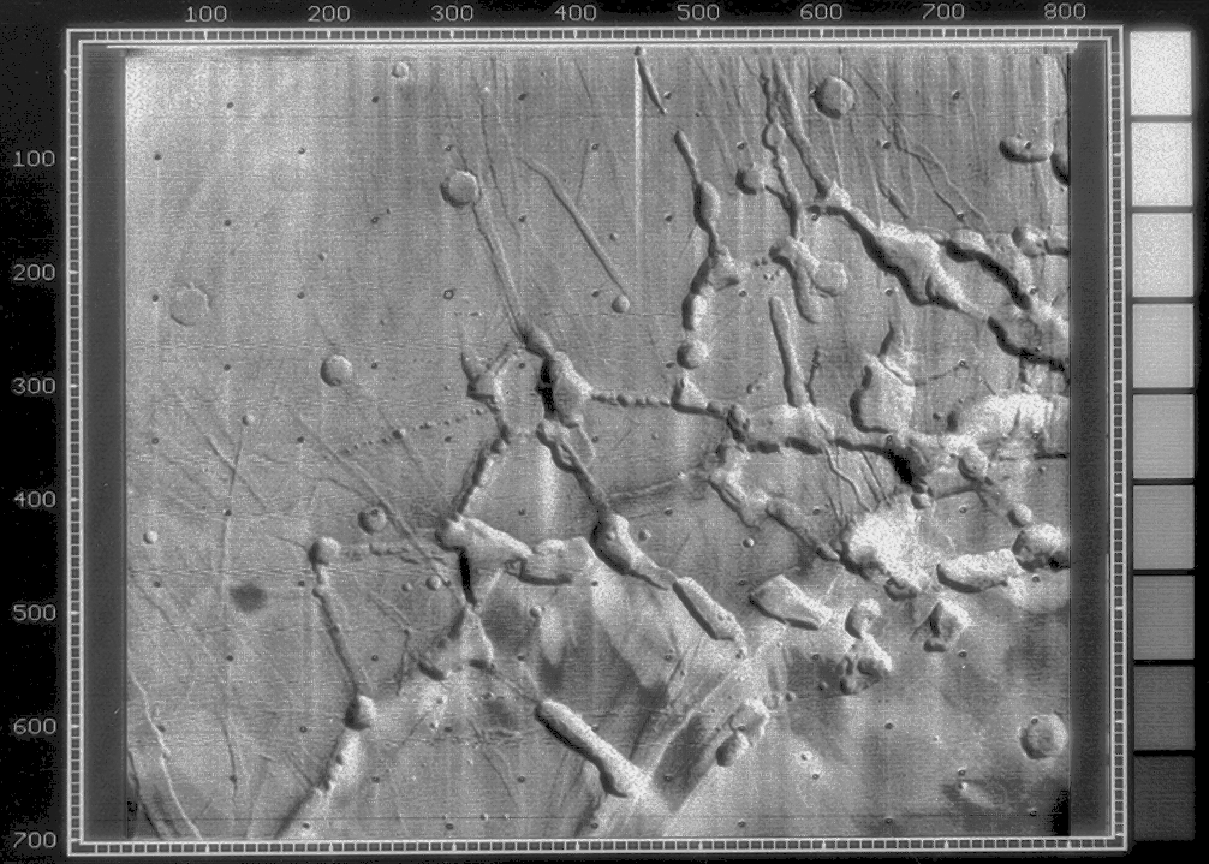
A photo from Mariner 9 of Noctis Labyrinthius

- Mariner 9 began the first mapping of the planet Mars, after dust storms on the red planet had ceased.

== January 4, 1972 (Tuesday) ==
- The first scientific electronic pocket calculator, the HP-35 was introduced by Hewlett-Packard and priced at $395 (equivalent to more than $2,400 in 2019). Although hand-held electronic machines, that could multiply and divide (such as the Canon Pocketronic) had been made since 1971, the HP-35 could handle higher functions including logarithms and trigonometry.

== January 5, 1972 (Wednesday) ==
- From his "Western White House" residence in San Clemente, California, President Richard Nixon announced that the United States would develop the Space Shuttle as the next phase of the American space program, with 5.5 billion dollars allocated to the first reusable spacecraft. "It would transform the space frontier of the 1970s into familiar territory," said Nixon, "easily accessible for human endeavor of the 1980s and 1990s."
- Soviet dissident Vladimir Bukovsky was convicted of Anti-Soviet agitation and sentenced to two years in prison, five in a labour camp, and five more in internal exile.

== January 6, 1972 (Thursday) ==
- The Rite of Christian Initiation of Adults (RCIA) was formally created by order of Pope Paul VI.
- The Kingdom of Bahrain granted the United States the use of a naval base in the Persian Gulf, over the objections of Iran.
- Television journalist Geraldo Rivera first attained national fame with his exposé of neglect and abuse of mentally ill patients at the Willowbrook State School on New York's Staten Island.
- Died: Chen Yi, 70, Chinese Foreign Minister

== January 7, 1972 (Friday) ==
- U.S. President Richard M. Nixon announced that he would run for re-election in 1972.
- Iberia Airlines Flight 602 crashed into a mountain peak while attempting to land at the Spanish island of Ibiza, killing all 104 people on board.
- At a press conference given by telephone to seven journalists assembled in Universal City, California, billionaire Howard Hughes discredited the "autobiography" that Clifford Irving had claimed to help him write.
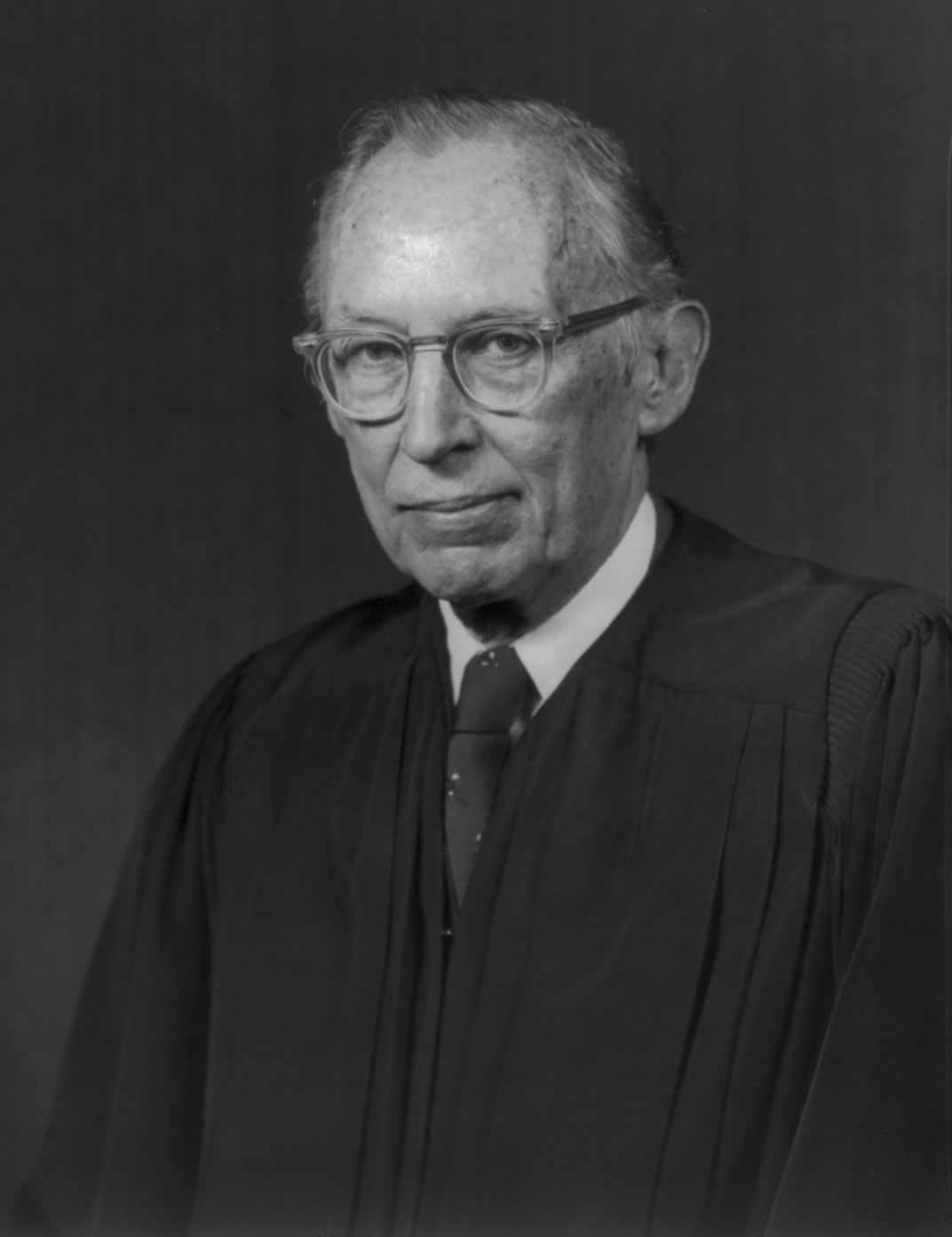
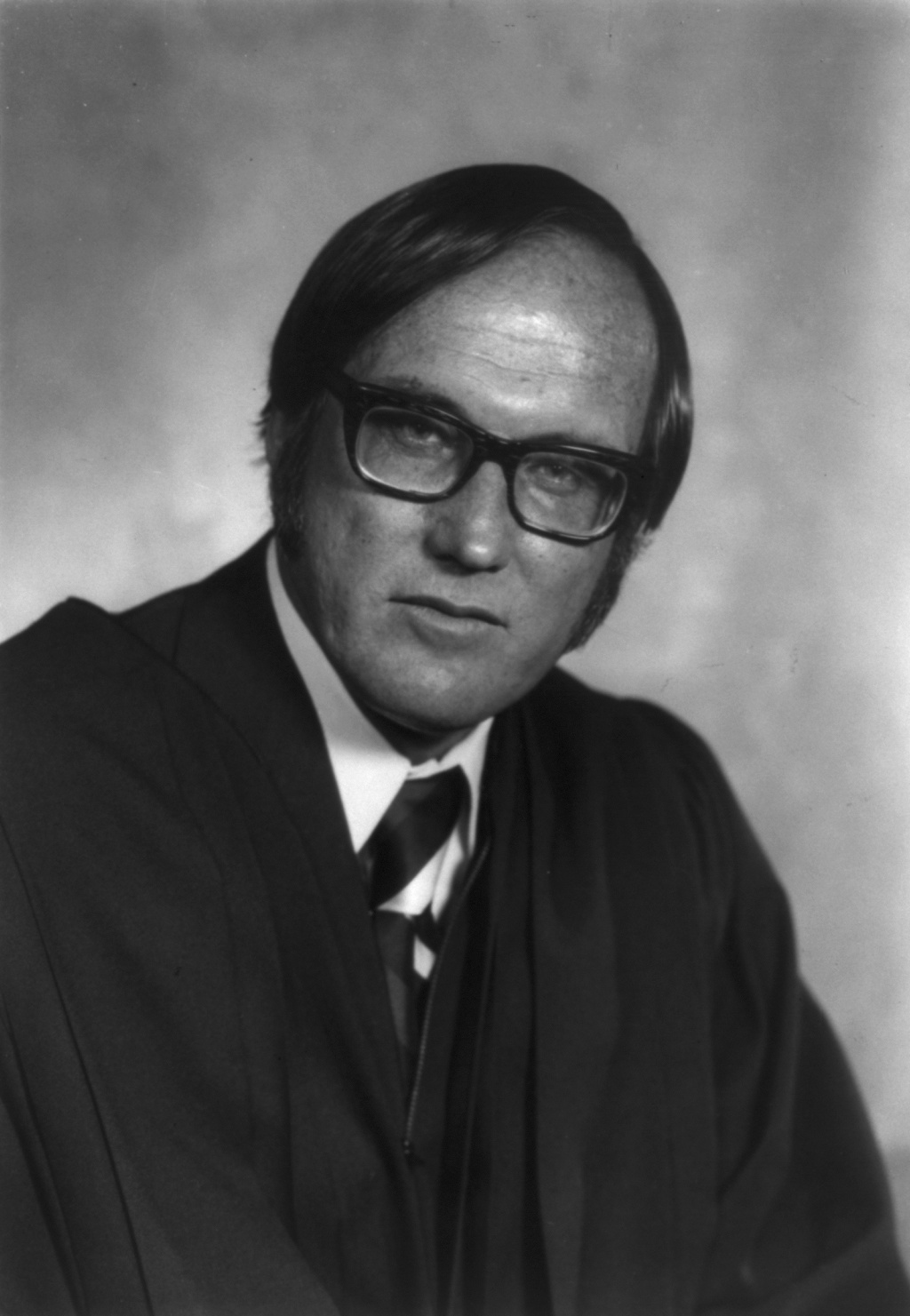
U.S. Supreme Court justices Powell and Rehnquist
- Lewis F. Powell Jr. and William H. Rehnquist were sworn in as the 103rd and 104th justices of the Supreme Court of the United States.
- The Los Angeles Lakers won their 33rd consecutive game with a 44-point victory (134–90) over the Atlanta Hawks, and extended their record to 39–3.
- Police located and defused time bombs that had been placed in safe deposit boxes in eight banks in New York, Chicago and San Francisco in July 1971. The bombs, described in an anonymous letter, sent the day before, each had a "seven-month fuse" and would have exploded in February. A ninth bomb had gone off prematurely in September.
- Died: John Berryman, 57, American poet and scholar; Berryman killed himself by leaping from the Washington Avenue Bridge (Minneapolis) to the Mississippi River, 70 feet (21 m) below.

== January 8, 1972 (Saturday) ==
- The Maharishi Mahesh Yogi, who popularized transcendental meditation, announced his "World Plan", with the goal of establishing 3,600 centers, each with 1,000 teachers apiece. By 1976, however, interest in "TM" began to decline and the plan was never realized.
- Dmitri Shostakovich's Symphony No. 15 in A Major was performed for the first time, at the Moscow Conservatory.
- Sheikh Mujibur Rahman was released from the Mianwali jail and allowed to leave Pakistan after more than nine months' imprisonment. Two days later, after flying to London and Delhi, he returned to Dhaka to become the first President of Bangladesh.
- Died: Kenneth Patchen, 60, American poet

== January 9, 1972 (Sunday) ==
- Shortly after midnight, Britain's 280,000 coal miners walked off the job in the first nationwide miners' strike since 1926. As the strike dragged on, Britain was forced to go to the Three-Day Week.

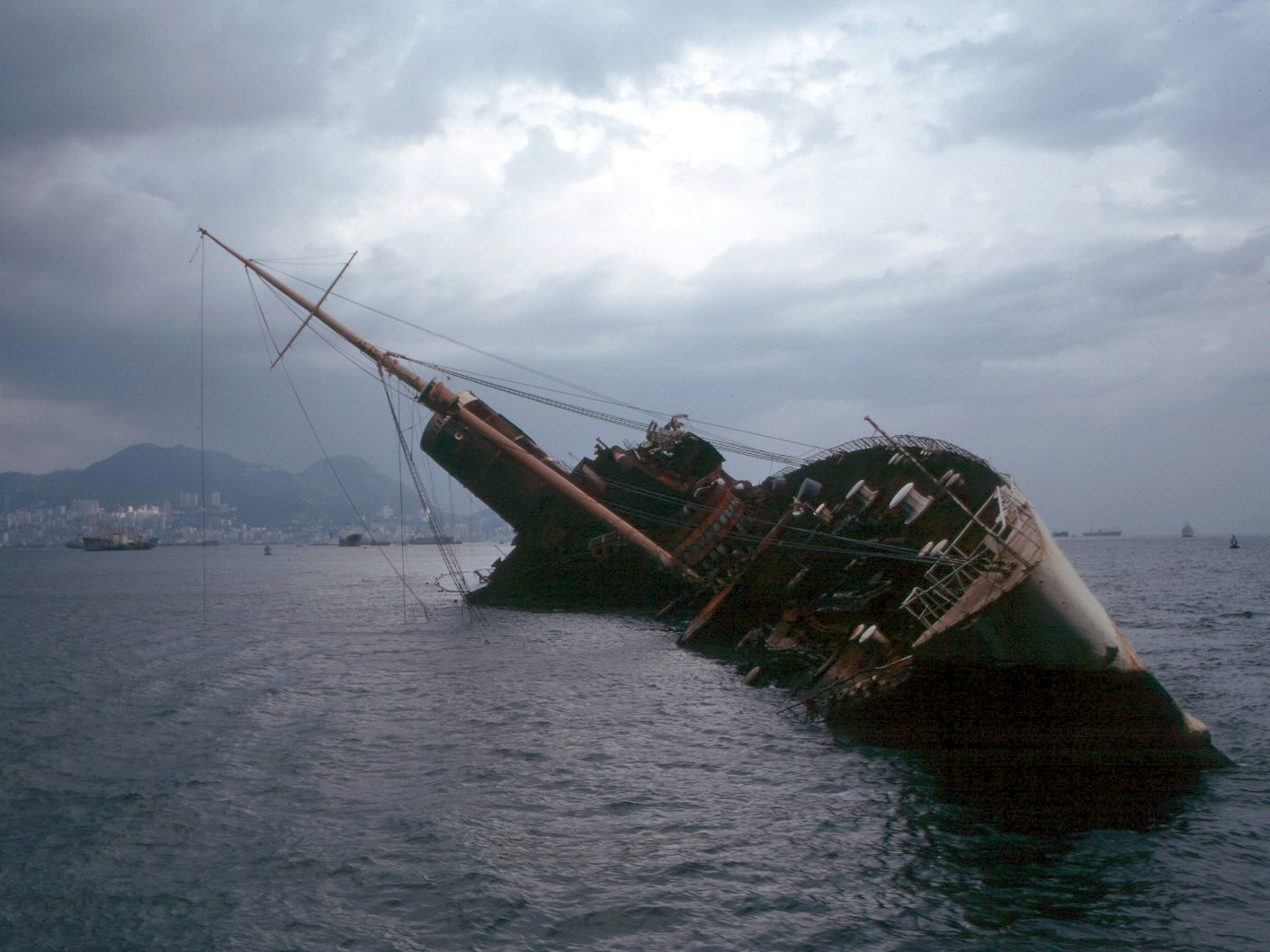
The wreckage of QE2

- The RMS Queen Elizabeth (QE2), largest ocean liner ever built, was destroyed by a fire as it sat in Victoria Harbour in Hong Kong. The ship was being renovated to become "Seawise University".
- The Los Angeles Lakers finally lost after 33 consecutive wins, falling to the Milwaukee Bucks, 120–104.
- Died: Liang Sicheng, 70, "Father of Modern Chinese Architecture"

== January 10, 1972 (Monday) ==
- Sheikh Mujibur Rahman, the "Bangabandhu" and "Father of Bangladesh", returned to Dhaka at 1:30 pm to a hero's welcome.
- In Britain, Birmingham's Sunday Mercury broke the story of toxic waste dumping in the Midlands, and the government's indifference to complaints. The public outcry that followed would lead to the passage of environmental legislation on March 30.
- In Baton Rouge, Louisiana, a violent confrontation between members of the Nation of Islam (NOI) left two sheriff's deputies dead and 14 other policemen injured. Two NOI members were killed, and 17 civilians were hurt.
- Born: Thomas Alsgaard, Norwegian Olympic cross-country gold medalist, in Enebakk
- Died: Aksel Larsen, 74, Danish politician

== January 11, 1972 (Tuesday) ==
- Bill France Jr. succeeded his father as President of the National Association for Stock Car Auto Racing NASCAR. Over the next 28 years, France oversaw the growth of stock car racing to a multibillion-dollar industry and one of the most popular sports in the United States.
- The Night Stalker, starring Darren McGavin, was broadcast as the ABC Movie of the Week. Watched by 75 million viewers, it was the highest rated made-for-television movie to that date, and would lead to a weekly television series for McGavin.
- Born: Marc Blucas, American actor known for Buffy the Vampire Slayer; in Girard, Pennsylvania

== January 12, 1972 (Wednesday) ==
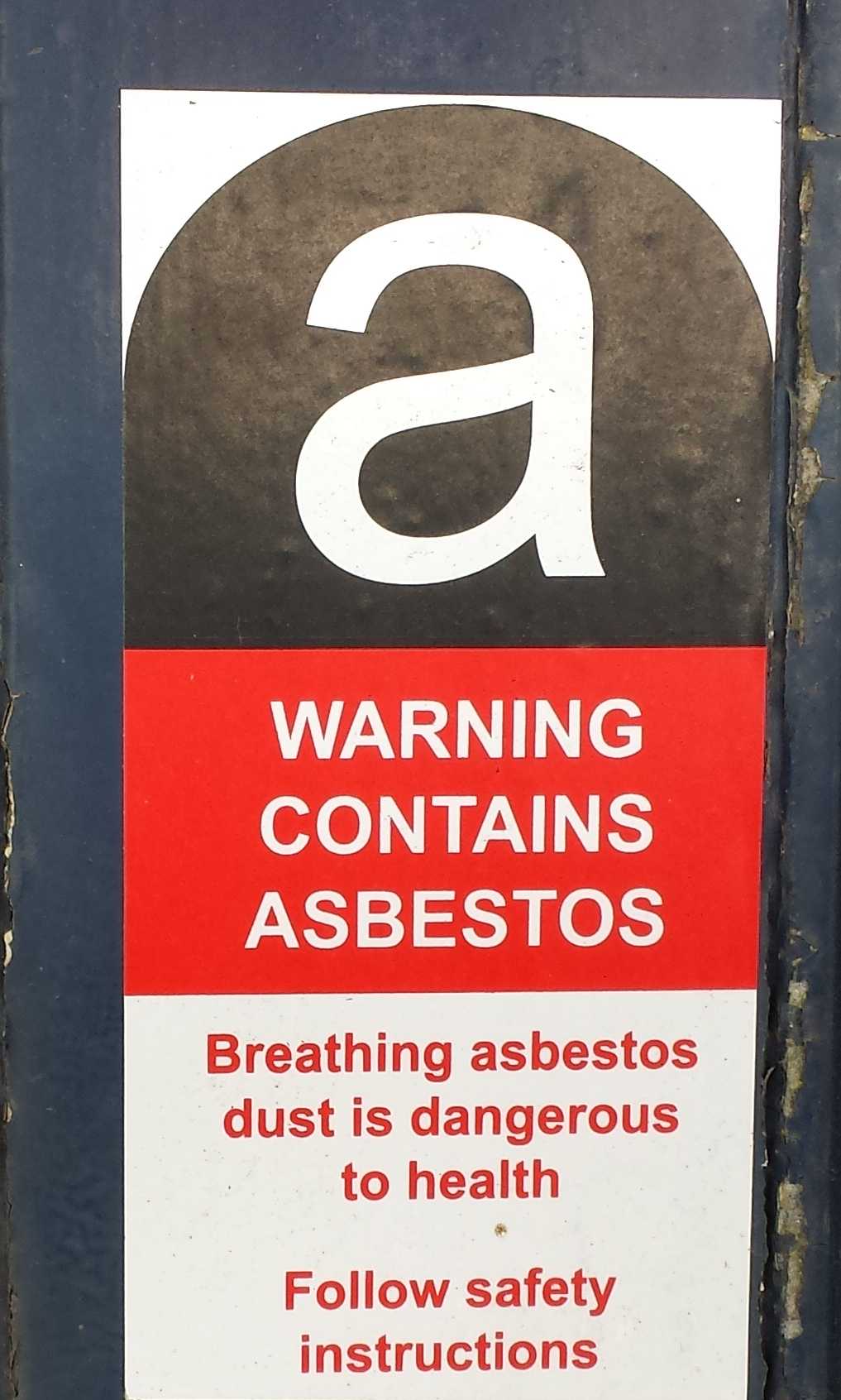

- The first regulations limiting exposure to asbestos were announced by the United States Department of Labor. Widely used in construction because of its fireproof nature, asbestos had been proven to be carcinogenic in the long term.
- The Detroit Tigers signed a 40-year lease for a $126 million dollar domed stadium, to be built downtown. Detroit voters, however, would refuse to approve funding a bond issue to pay for the dome, and it would never be built. The team would continue to play at Tiger Stadium until moving to the outdoor Comerica Park in 1998.
- Born: Espen Knutsen, Norwegian hockey star, in Oslo

== January 13, 1972 (Thursday) ==
- While he was out of the country for treatment of an eye ailment, Kofi Abrefa Busia, the Prime Minister of Ghana, lost his job when the government was overthrown in a bloodless coup, led by Lt. Col. Ignatius Kutu Acheampong, leader of the "National Redemption Council". Dr. Busia lived the rest of his life in London. Acheampong was overthrown in 1978 and was executed the following year.
- U.S. President Richard Nixon announced that 70,000 American troops would be pulled out of Vietnam by May 1, cutting the existing force of 139,000 by half.
- Alabama Governor George C. Wallace announced his candidacy for the Democratic Party nomination. The previous day, the Internal Revenue Service had dropped its investigation of Wallace's brother Gerald. Historian Stephen E. Ambrose suggested in his 1989 book Nixon: The Triumph of a Politician, 1962–1972, that President Nixon had brokered a deal in order to ensure his re-election in 1972. With Nixon and Hubert Humphrey having announced their candidacies earlier in the week, all three major contenders in the 1968 election were in the 1972 race.
- A plane, taking West Germany's Chancellor Willy Brandt home after his visit to the United States, came within 500 feet (150 m) of colliding with Eastern Airlines Flight 870, as both planes were flying at 33,000 feet (10,000 m) 85 miles (137 km) northeast of Jacksonville, Florida. A spokesman for the Professional Air Traffic Controllers' Association said on January 15 that the incident had been reported to him by controllers at the Jacksonville airport.
- Born:
  - Nicole Eggert, American actress (Charles in Charge, Baywatch), in Glendale, California
  - Vitaly Scherbo, Belarusian gymnast, winner of six Olympic gold medals in 1992, in Minsk

== January 14, 1972 (Friday) ==
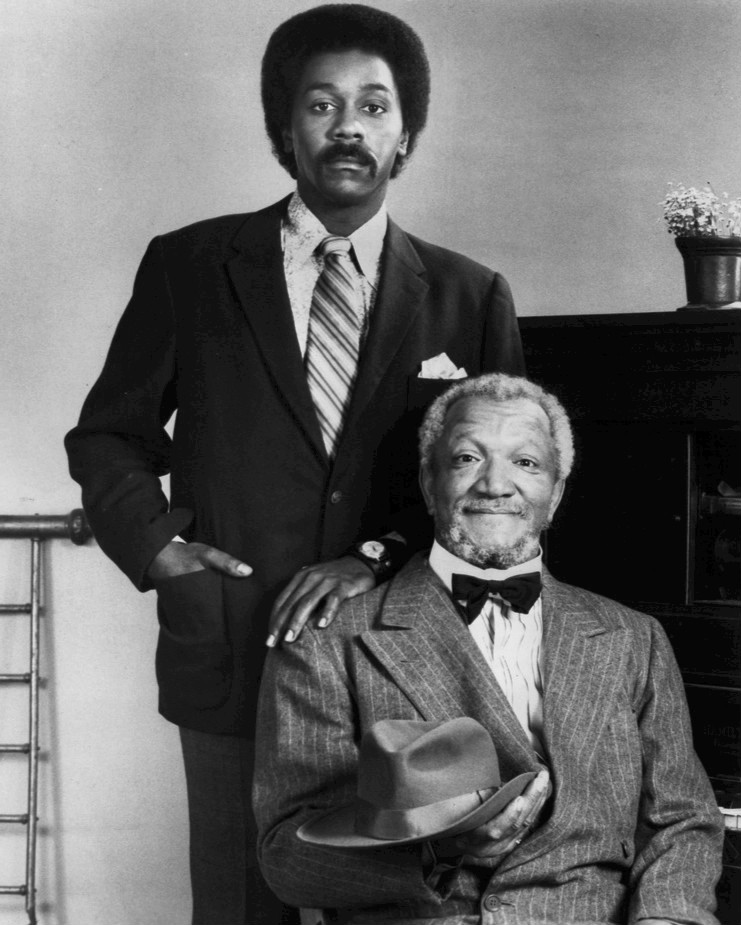
Demond Wilson and Redd Foxx

- At 8:00 pm Eastern time, Sanford and Son premiered on NBC. Starring Redd Foxx and Demond Wilson, the show ran until 1977. Based on the BBC comedy Steptoe and Son, the show replaced The D.A., a legal drama.
- Jesse Jackson and other leaders founded the organization PUSH (People United to Save Humanity).
- Died: King Frederik IX of Denmark died at the age of 71, at the Copenhagen Municipal Hospital, at 7:50 pm His daughter Margrethe was crowned Queen the following day.

== January 15, 1972 (Saturday) ==
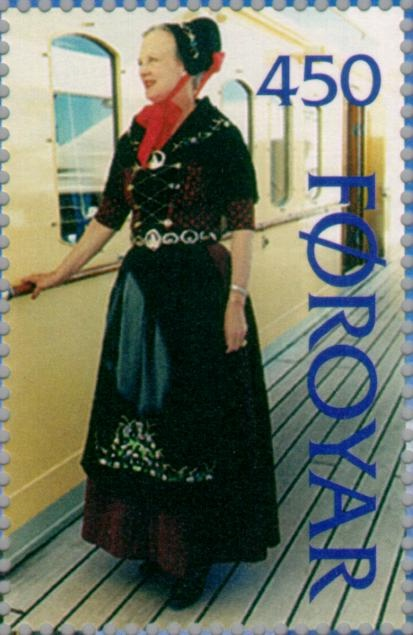
Queen Margrethe II of Denmark

- At 3:00 pm, at the balcony of the Christiansborg Palace in Copenhagen, Prime Minister Jens Otto Krag proclaimed three times, "King Frederik IX is dead! Long live Her Majesty Queen Margrethe II!" With that, Margrethe became the second queen of Denmark, with the same name as her ancestor, who had reigned from 1353 to 1412. There is no provision for a coronation, or even a crown, for the monarchs of Denmark.
- Emilio Colombo resigned as Prime Minister of Italy.
- American boxer Joe Frazier retained his World heavyweight championship by knocking out Terry Daniels in the fourth round at the Rivergate Convention Center in New Orleans.

== January 16, 1972 (Sunday) ==
- The Dallas Cowboys won their first NFL championship, defeating the Miami Dolphins in Super Bowl VI at New Orleans. After taking a 10–0 lead, the Cowboys went on to win 24–3.
- Born:
  - Salah Hissou, Moroccan long-distance runner who held the world record from 1996 to 1997 for fastest 10,000 meter run; in Ait Taghia, Kasba Tadla
  - Joe Horn, NFL receiver, in Tupelo, Mississippi
  - Greg Page, Australian musician, actor, and activist, co-founder of The Wiggles, in Sydney
- Died: Ross Bagdasarian, Sr., 52, aka David Seville of Alvin and the Chipmunks

== January 17, 1972 (Monday) ==
- Police in Chicago arrested two college students, Allan C. Schwandner and Stephen Pera, who had planned to poison the city's water supply with typhoid and other bacteria. Schwandner had founded a terrorist group, "R.I.S.E.", while Pera collected and grew cultures from the hospital where he worked. The two men fled to Cuba after being released on bail. Schwandner was fatally beaten by a Cuban prison director in 1974. Pera returned to the U.S. in 1975 and was put on probation.
- "Huge Monday" took place on the North Shore of Oahu; 20-foot (6.1 m) waves made it "the greatest single day in surfing history".
- Bangladesh adopted a new flag with a gold map of the country in a red disc, later simplified.
- Born:
  - Ken Hirai, Japanese pop singer, in Higashiōsaka, Osaka
  - Mike Lieberthal, MLB catcher, in Glendale, California
- Died:
  - Orville Nix, 61, Dallas air conditioning engineer who filmed the assassination of John F. Kennedy
  - Betty Smith, 75, author of A Tree Grows in Brooklyn

== January 18, 1972 (Tuesday) ==
- Mao Zedong secretly designated Prime Minister Zhou Enlai to succeed him as leader of the People's Republic of China. Zhou would die on January 8, 1976, eight months before Mao.

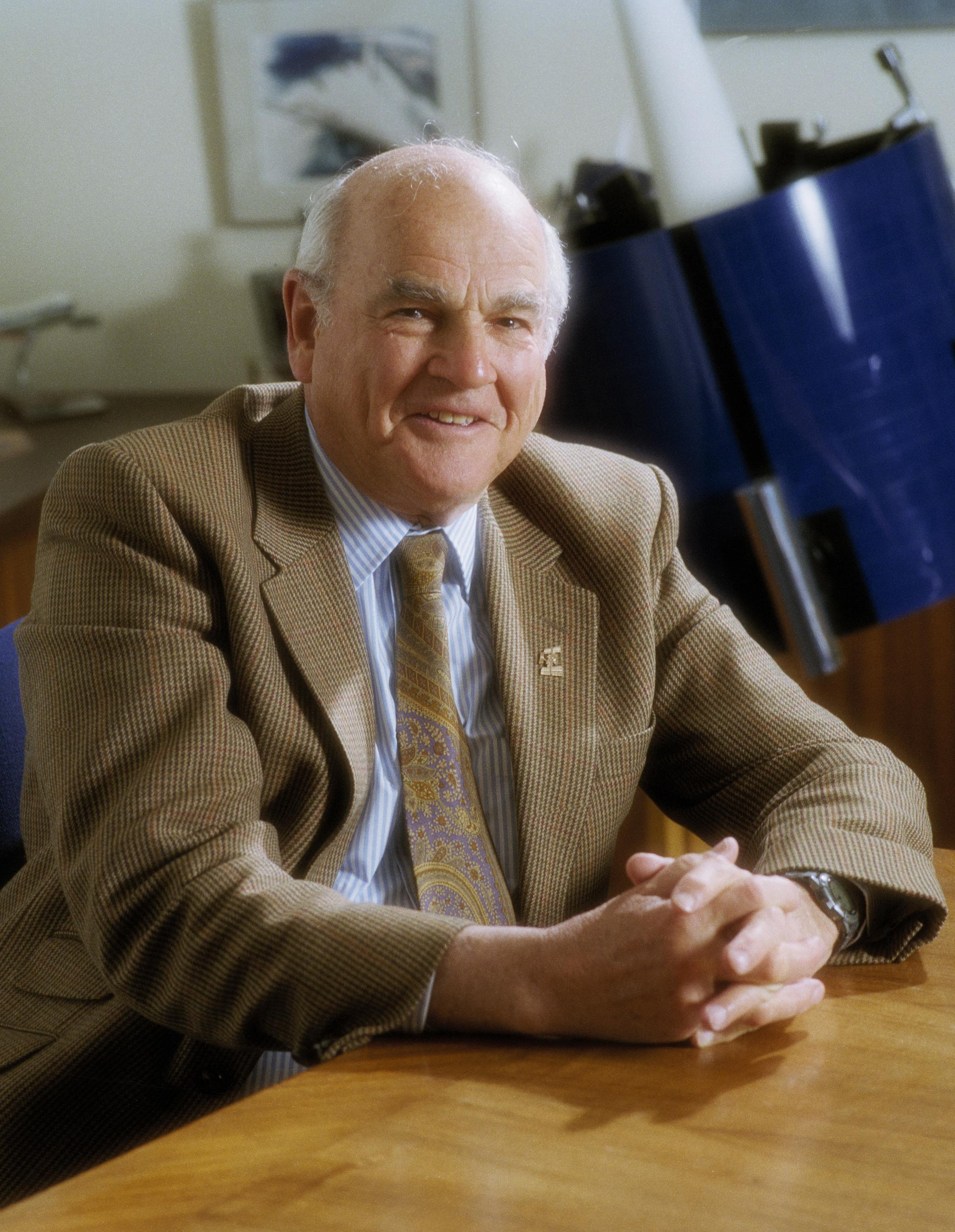
Dr. Blumberg

- Dr. Baruch Samuel Blumberg was awarded U.S. Patent No. 3,636,191 for a vaccine against hepatitis B. Dr. Blumberg won the Nobel Prize in Physiology or Medicine in 1976.
- The United States Coast Guard cutter USCGC Storis (WMEC-38) seized two Soviet fishing vessels, the flagship Lamut and the stern trawler Kolyvan, after they had penetrated American territorial waters less than 12 miles (19 km) off the Alaskan coast. The ships were detained at the Adak Naval Air Station until February 17, then released after the Soviets paid a $250,000 fine.
- Died: Clarence Earl Gideon, 61, subject of landmark Supreme Court decision in Gideon v. Wainwright

== January 19, 1972 (Wednesday) ==
The Minervan flag

- The "Republic of Minerva" was proclaimed by Michael Oliver of the Phoenix Foundation and a group of entrepreneurs who had built an island by towing sand onto the underwater Minerva Reefs, located in the South Pacific Ocean, 260 miles (420 km) west of Tonga. The micronation, which printed its own currency and coinage, would come to an end when Tonga annexed the reefs on June 21.
- In Strasbourg, the Council of Europe adopted the Anthem of Europe, based on the final movement of Beethoven's Ninth Symphony ("Ode to Joy"). It would become the anthem for the European Union created in 1993.
- the Associated Press selected Mexican-American professional golfer Lee Trevino as the male professional athlete of 1971, after he won the U.S. Open, the British Open and the Canadian Open tournaments in a four-week period and had been voted PGA Player of the Year.
- Born:
  - Angham, Egyptian pop star and actress, as Angham Mohamed Ali Suleiman, in Alexandria
  - Drea de Matteo, American actress (The Sopranos), in Queens, New York

== January 20, 1972 (Thursday) ==
- In Geneva, the member nations of the Organization of the Petroleum Exporting Countries (OPEC) agreed to raise their price for crude oil by 8.49 percent, to $2.49 per barrel, the first of many sharp increases that would follow.
- LIFE Magazine and McGraw-Hill postponed the scheduled release of The Autobiography of Howard Hughes, written by Clifford Irving. LIFE had planned to serialize it beginning with its February 11 issue, while McGraw-Hill had a March 10 release date. Proven later to be a hoax, the would-be bestseller was never sold.
- Hughes Airwest Flight 8800 was hijacked as it taxied for a takeoff from McCarran International Airport. Imitating D. B. Cooper, passenger "D. Shane" demanded $50,000 in cash and two parachutes after threatening to explode a bomb, and after releasing the passengers and stewardesses, ordered the DC-9 to fly eastward. Shane—later identified as Richard Charles LaPoint—bailed out over the Rockies and landed 21 miles (34 km) northwest of Akron, Colorado, where he was captured by state police, along with the ransom. LaPoint, 23, received a 40-year federal prison sentence.
- Karen Wise became the first woman to play NCAA college basketball (limited at that time to men), when she took the court for Windham College against Castleton State College. Playing for two minutes, she gathered one rebound but did not score in her team's 84–38 loss.

== January 21, 1972 (Friday) ==
- India added three new States, bringing the total to 20, with statehood granted to Tripura, Manipur and Meghalaya. On the same day, Mizoram and Arunachal Pradesh were granted union territory status (both granted statehood in 1987). As of 2009, there are 28 states and seven territories in India.
- Hundreds of guests at a wedding in New Delhi drank bootleg liquor and were poisoned by what turned out to be a mixture of rubbing alcohol and paint varnish. By Sunday, more than 100 had died.

== January 22, 1972 (Saturday) ==
- In the first expansion of the European Economic Community since its founding by six members in 1952, a Treaty of Accession was signed at Brussels, by the United Kingdom, Ireland, Denmark and Norway. Norwegian voters did not approve the treaty, but the other three nations joined the "Common Market" on January 1, 1973.
- The NBC television series Emergency!, created by R. A. Cinader and Jack Webb premiered as a mid-season replacement a week after its 2-hour pilot had been shown as a made-for-TV movie. With action divided between a team of paramedics at a Los Angeles County fire station, and the physicians and nurse at an emergency room, the show proved popular and competed directly for viewers against the #1 show in the nation, the CBS comedy All in the Family.
- Born:
  - Gabriel Macht, American actor and film producer, in The Bronx, New York
  - Romi Park, Japanese voice actress, in Tokyo

== January 23, 1972 (Sunday) ==
- U.S. Air Force bombing of Viet Cong guerrilla strongholds in South Vietnam halted after more than nine years. A historian would later note that "some 4 million tons of bombs fell" on South Vietnam "making it the most-bombed country in the history of aerial warfare."
- Formula One champion Jackie Stewart began the defense of his title by winning the 1972 Argentine Grand Prix in Buenos Aires. On completion of the race, he learned that his father, Robert Paul Stewart, had died earlier in the day.
- Born: Léa Drucker, French actress known for the television series War of the Worlds; in Caen, Calvados (department) département

== January 24, 1972 (Monday) ==
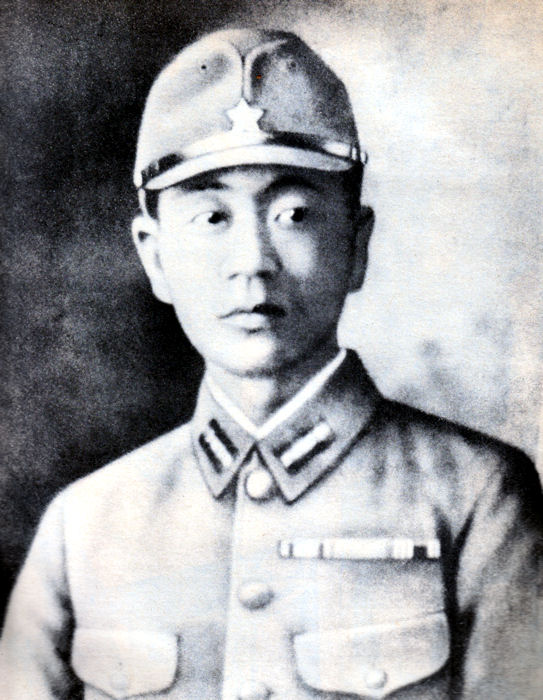
Sergeant Yokoi in World War II

- After hiding for more than 27 years, Sergeant Shoichi Yokoi was discovered on Guam by two hunters, Manuel de Garcia and Jesus Duenas. One of 19,000 Japanese soldiers occupying the island during World War II, Sgt. Yokoi had disappeared into the jungle near the Talofofo River after American forces recaptured Guam in 1944.
- Meeting with scientists at Multan, Prime Minister Zulfikar Ali Bhutto secretly launched Pakistan's program to build a nuclear weapon.
- The Iowa Caucus, which would later mark the opening of delegate selection in U.S. presidential election campaigns, was conducted for the first time. The initial event, marked by gatherings in 2,600 at homes and meeting rooms in election precincts statewide, was limited to registered Democrats, and would displace the New Hampshire primary as the first test for political party nominees. When the results were finally tabulated the next day, U.S. Senator Edmund Muskie of Maine won 18 of Iowa's 46 Democratic delegates, while U.S. Senator George McGovern of South Dakota won 10, while the remaining 18 were uncommitted.
- A month after bringing the Emirate of Sharjah into the United Arab Emirates, the emir, Khalid bin Mohammed Al Qasimi was assassinated in a coup attempt by the previous ruler, Saqr bin Sultan al-Qasimi, whom Khalid had overthrown in 1965. Saqr failed to regain the throne, and Sharjah has been ruled since then by Khalid's brother, Sultan bin Muhammad Al-Qasimi.
- Born: Daniel Kawczynski, Polish-British politician, MP for Shrewsbury and Atcham, in Warsaw, Poland
- Died: Gene Austin, 71, American singer

== January 25, 1972 (Tuesday) ==
- In a nationally televised address, President Nixon revealed that Henry Kissinger had been secretly negotiating with North Vietnamese leaders, and announced "a plan for peace that can end the war in Vietnam". North Vietnam rejected the proposal the next day.

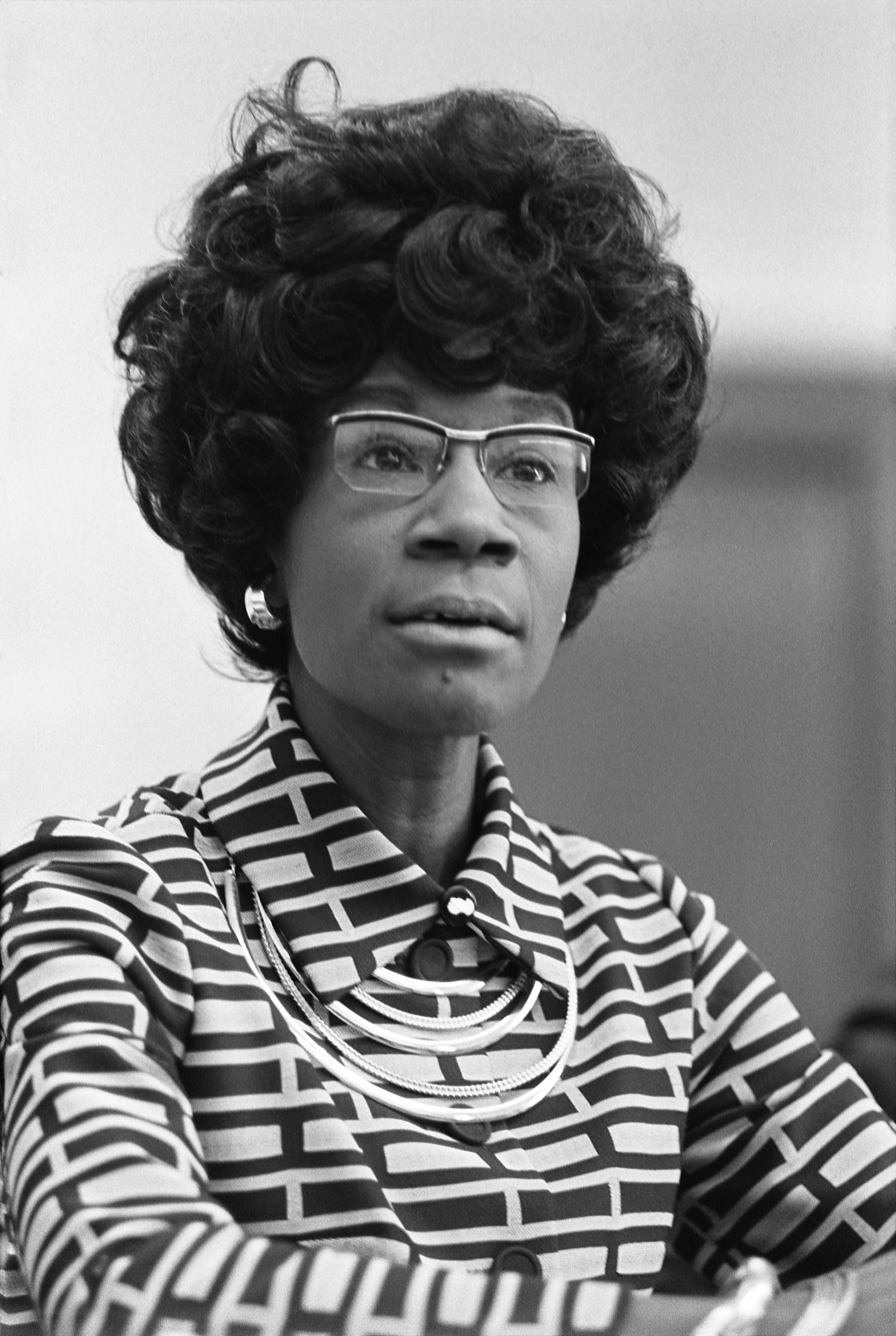
U.S. Representative Chisholm

- Shirley Chisholm, the first black woman to be elected to Congress (representing New York's 12th Congressional District) announced that she would seek the Democratic nomination for president.
- Two Ohio State players—Luke Witte and Mark Wagar—were sent to the hospital when a fight broke out in their college basketball game at Minnesota. With 0:36 left, and Ohio State leading 50–44, Corky Taylor and Ron Behagen of Minnesota attacked Witte. A brawl between both teams lasted for more than a minute before the game was called. Taylor and Behagen were suspended for the rest of the season. Witte declined to file charges.
- Died:
  - Carl Hayden, 94; American legislator and former President Pro Tempore of the U.S. Senate from 1957 to 1969), who had represented Arizona in Congress for 57 years. Hayden had been the first at-large U.S. Representative when Arizona was admitted to the union in 1912, then continued as a U.S. Senator starting in 1927 until finishing his seventh term in 1969.
  - Erhard Milch, 79, developer of Germany's Luftwaffe

== January 26, 1972 (Wednesday) ==
- On the lawn in front of the Australian Parliament in Canberra, four young Aborigine men (Michael Anderson, Billy Craigie, Gary Williams and Tony Coorey) erected a tent that they called the Aboriginal Embassy, a symbol of the feeling that the indigenous Australians were treated as foreigners in their own homeland. Soon, the four were joined by others, until nearly 2,000 supporters encamped in front of the Parliament. The "embassy" was torn down six months later.
- A Croatian terrorist organization planted a bomb in JAT Yugoslav Flight 364, which exploded over Czechoslovakia, at an altitude of 33,000 feet (10,000 m), killing 27 of the 28 people on board. Remarkably, a stewardess Vesna Vulović, who had been in the tail section of the DC-9, survived despite falling more than 6 miles (9.7 km), landing near Srbská Kamenice. She was released after a hospitalization of 16 months.
- The first Eclipse Awards, recognizing horse racing achievements, were made, in a ceremony at New York's Waldorf-Astoria Hotel.
- At the request of her ex-husband, actor Richard Wagner, actress Natalie Wood visited his home in Palm Springs, California. Wagner and Wood, who had married in 1957 and divorced in 1962, remained together from this date onward, remarrying each other in July. Wood and Wagner were married until Wood's mysterious death in November 1981; in 2018, Wagner would be named a person of interest in the investigation into Wood's death.
- Born:
  - Christopher Boykin, "Big Black" on MTV show Rob & Big, in Wiggins, Mississippi (d. 2017)
  - Peter Peschel, German footballer, in Prudnik, Poland

== January 27, 1972 (Thursday) ==
- Magnavox introduced the first home video game system, Odyssey. Designed by Ralph Baer, the console could be hooked up to a television set for two players to play a tennis-like game, similar to Nolan Bushnell's game Pong.
- In a meeting at the office of U.S. Attorney General John N. Mitchell, G. Gordon Liddy presented the "Gemstone Plan" to Mitchell, John Dean, and Jeb Magruder. Mitchell was also the Director of the Committee to Re-Elect the President (CRP), and Liddy was CRP's chief lawyer. Liddy suggested budgeting $1,000,000 for mugging and even kidnapping "leaders of anti-Nixon demonstrations"; hiring prostitutes to solicit during the 1972 Democratic National Convention; and break-ins and installation of electronic surveillance as necessary. Mitchell rejected the plan, but retained Liddy to suggest new ideas.
- After hijacking Mohawk Airlines Flight 452 and landing in Poughkeepsie, New York, Heinrick Von George, a debt-ridden father of seven, was given, as demanded, a duffel bag with $200,000 in cash and a getaway car. As he prepared to drive away with his money and his hostage, Von George was killed by a shotgun blast fired by an FBI agent.
- Police Officers Gregory Philip Foster and Rocco W. Laurie of the New York City Police Department were fatally shot in the back by members of the Black Liberation Army while walking their patrol beat. Foster and Laurie had served together as United States Marines in the Vietnam War and had requested assignment to the same NYPD precinct. A television film, Foster and Laurie, about the two slain officers would be broadcast in 1975.
- Born:
  - Mark Owen, English singer (Take That), in Oldham
  - Keith Wood, Irish rugby star, in Killaloe, County Clare
- Died:
  - Richard Courant, 84, German-born American mathematician
  - Mahalia Jackson, 60, African-American gospel singer

== January 28, 1972 (Friday) ==
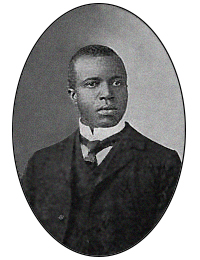
Joplin (1868–1917)

- More than 60 years after it had been written, Scott Joplin's opera Treemonisha was performed for the first time. The score had been rediscovered in 1970, and was brought to life at the Atlanta Memorial Arts Center. Joplin, an African-American composer who had died in 1917, would be awarded a posthumous Pulitzer Prize in 1976, and honored with a U.S. postage stamp in 1983. Joplin's ragtime composition "The Entertainer", featured in the film The Sting, would become a bestseller in 1974.
- Born: Amy Coney Barrett, Associate Justice of the Supreme Court of the United States since 2020; in New Orleans, Louisiana

== January 29, 1972 (Saturday) ==
- In Bonn, West Germany's Chancellor Willy Brandt, and the leaders of the ten Bundesländer (states) agreed upon the "Radikalenerlass", a decree to bar any known radical from government employment.

== January 30, 1972 (Sunday) ==
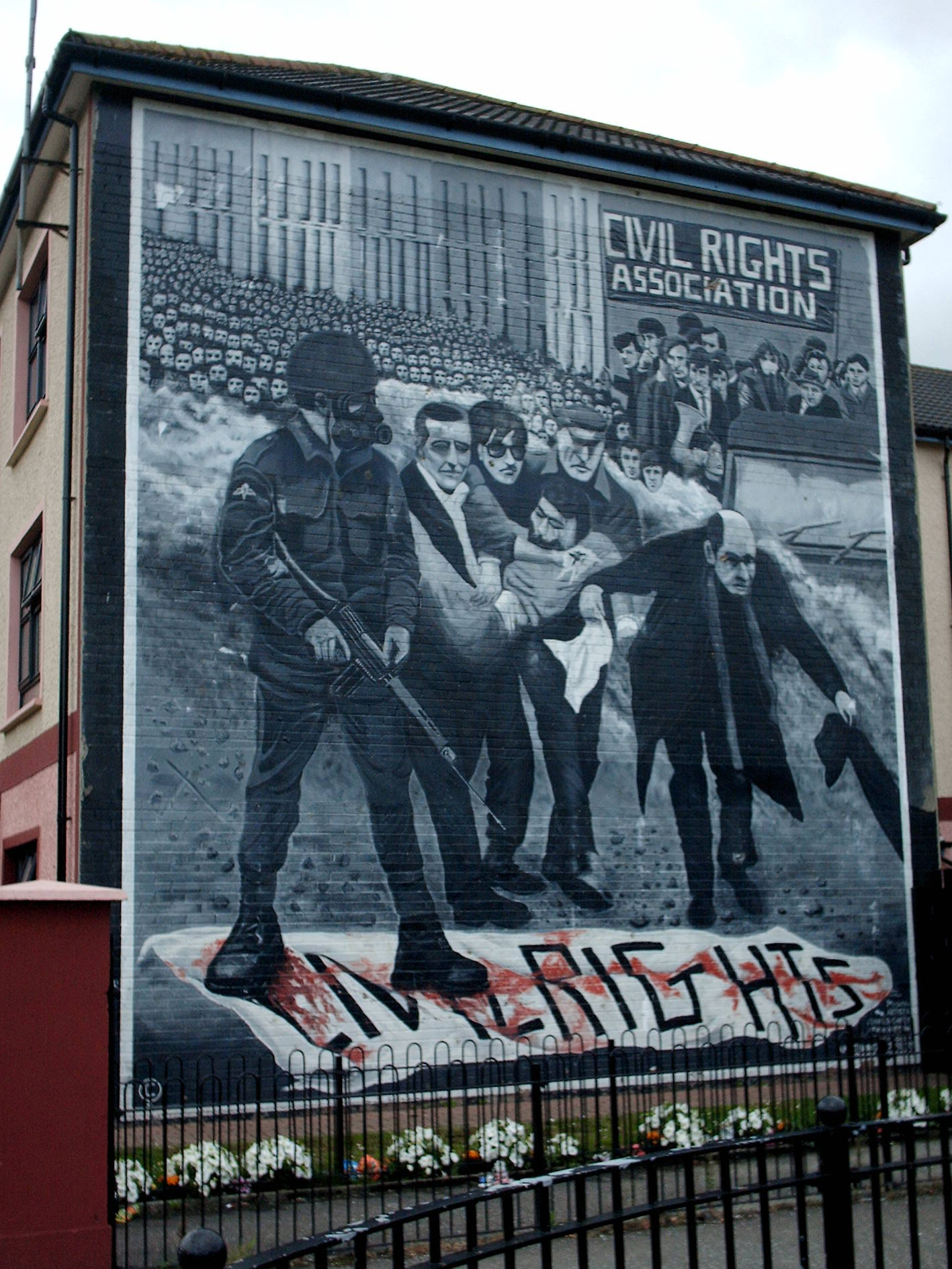
A mural in Derry commemorating Bloody Sunday

- Troops from the 1st Battalion, The Parachute Regiment, fired into a crowd of unarmed Catholic protesters in Derry, Northern Ireland. Thirteen people were killed (a fourteenth victim would die months later), and another 14 wounded. Outrage over what became known as "Bloody Sunday", followed by the subsequent exoneration of the paratroopers, fueled the growth of the Irish Republican Army.

== January 31, 1972 (Monday) ==
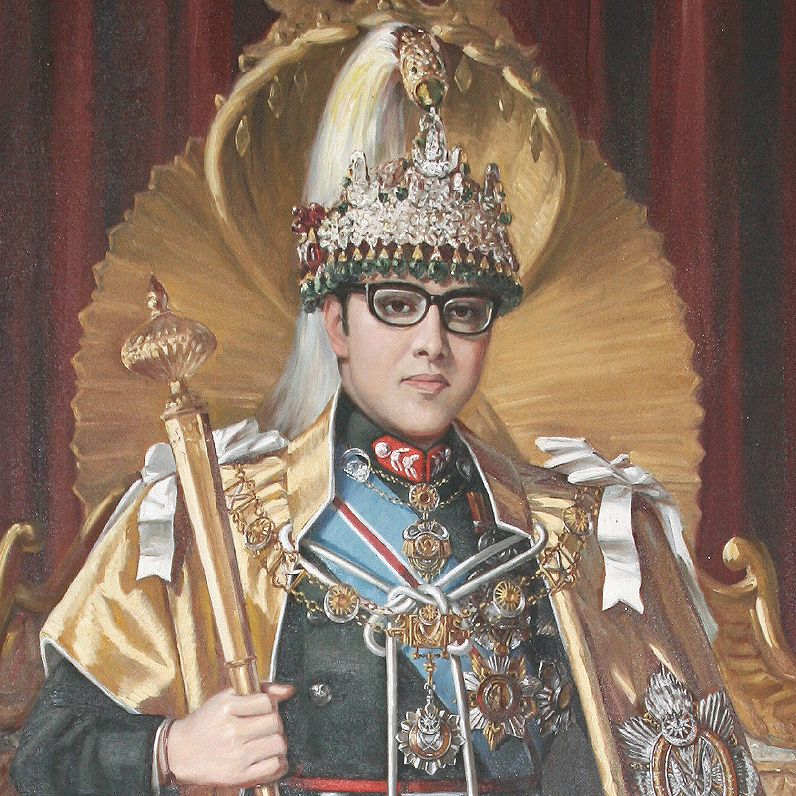
King Birendra of Nepal

- The Federal Aviation Administration issued new regulations, requiring all United States airlines to screen passengers (and their carry on baggage) for weapons before boarding, with a deadline of May 8, 1972, for compliance. There were no hijackings in the United States in 1973.
- Karl Schranz of Austria, the 1970 alpine skiing champion in the giant slalom, was barred three days before the 1972 Winter Olympics were to begin, by a 28–14 vote by the International Olympic Committee. Schranz was among 40 skiers accused of violating amateur rules by accepting endorsement money from ski equipment companies, and the only skier to be banned.
- Died: King Mahendra Bir Bikram Shah of Nepal, who had worked to end the isolation of his Himalayan kingdom, died in Kathmandu at 51. He was succeeded by his son, Birendra.
