= December 1971 =

Month of 1971

<<	December 1971					>>
Su	Mo	Tu	We	Th	Fr	Sa
			1	2	3	4
5	6	7	8	9	10	11
12	13	14	15	16	17	18
19	20	21	22	23	24	25
26	27	28	29	30	31

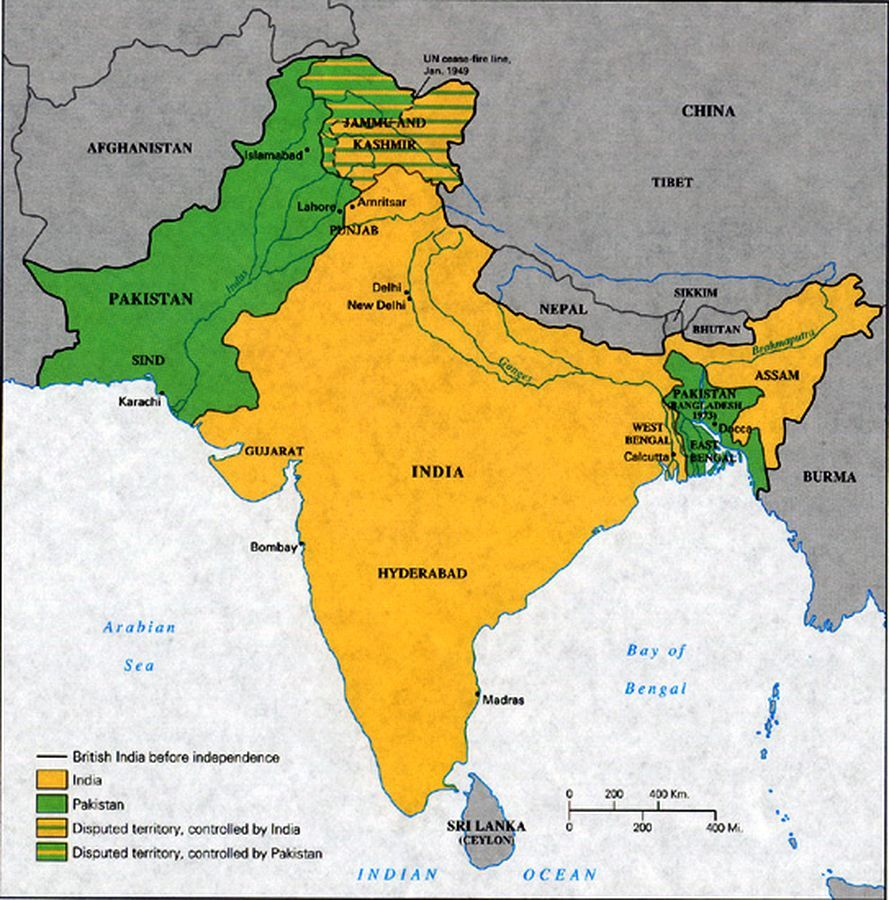
December 16, 1971: Pakistan surrenders its province of East Pakistan, Republic of Bangladesh is created

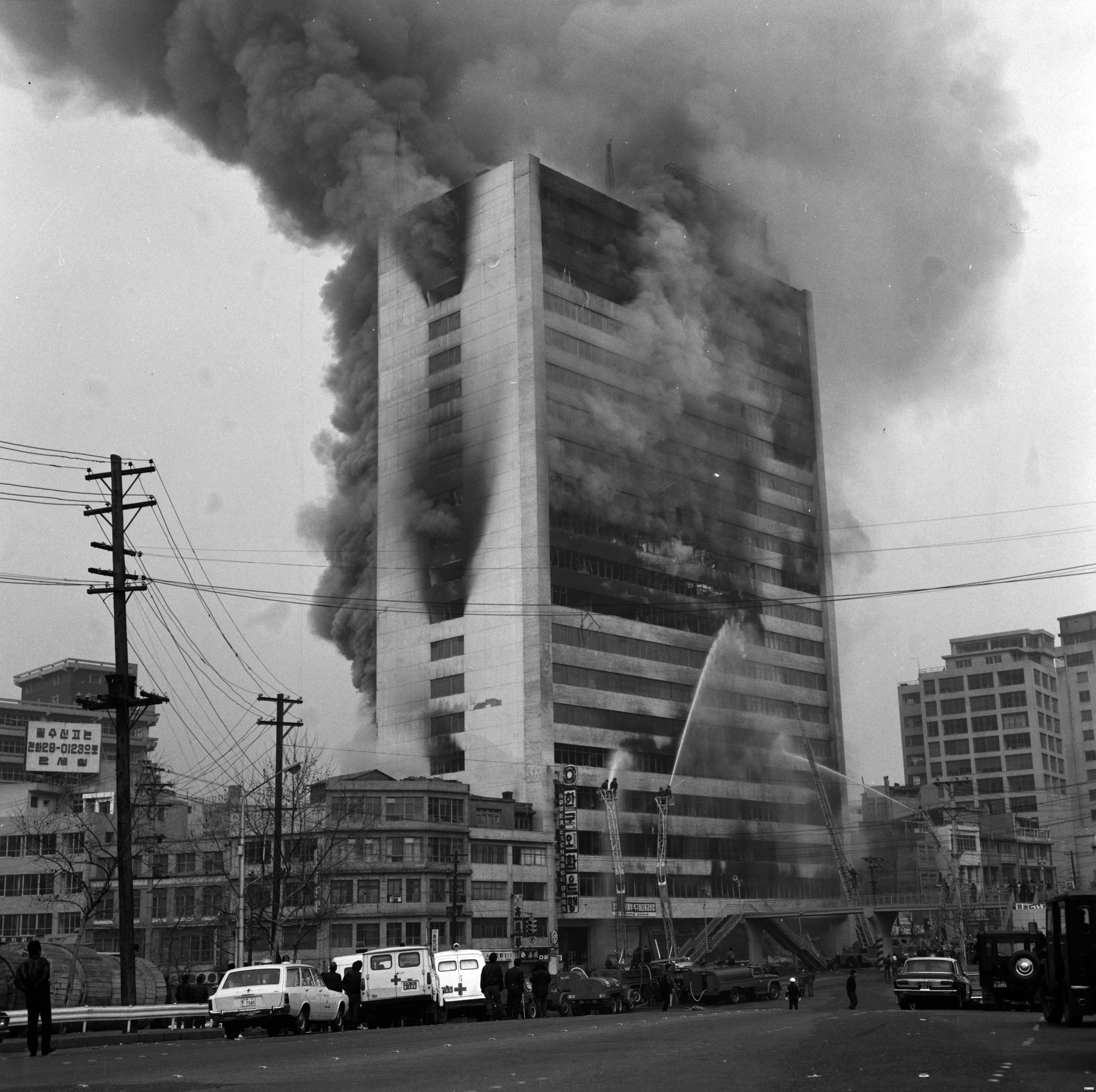
December 25, 1971: Daeyeonggak Hotel fire in South Korea kills 158 people

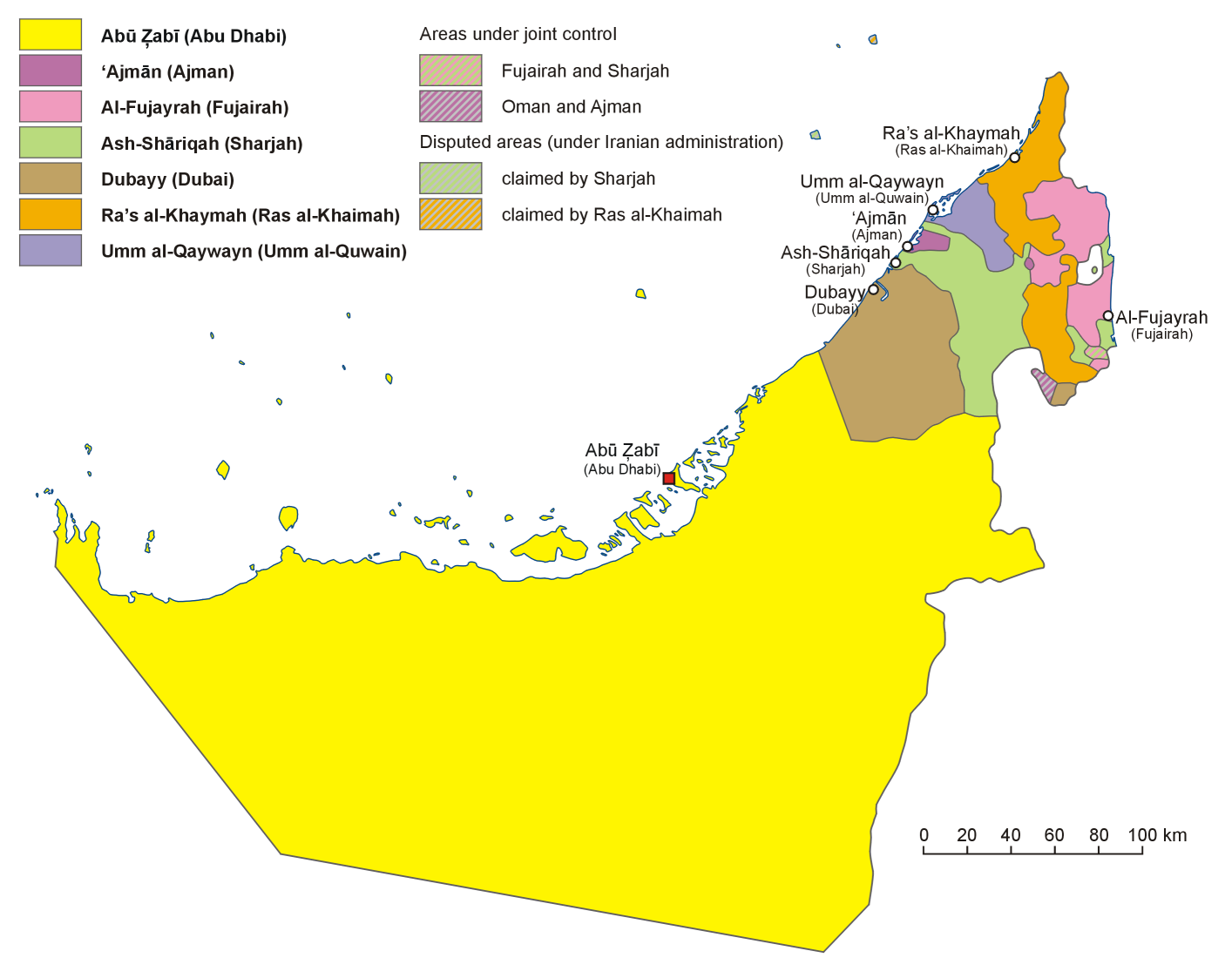
December 2, 1971: United Arab Emirates founded as federation of seven oil-rich sheikhdoms

The following events occurred in December 1971:

== December 1, 1971 (Wednesday) ==
- The British House of Commons narrowly approved the Government's plan for a settlement with Rhodesia, negotiated by Alec Douglas-Home, 297 to 289.
- In the Cambodian Civil War, Khmer Rouge rebels intensified their assaults on Cambodian government positions, forcing the Cambodian retreat from Kompong Thmar and nearby Ba Ray, 10 kilometres (6.2 mi) northeast of Phnom Penh.
- The French submarine Redoutable (S611) was commissioned as the first SNLE (‘’’S ‘’’ous-marin ‘’’N ‘’’ucléaire ‘’’L ‘’’anceur d'‘’’E ‘’’ngins or "Device-Launching Nuclear Submarine").
- The National Industrial Relations Court was established in the UK.
- The municipality of Buchenbach was formed by the merger of the former political entities of Buchenbach and Falkensteig.
- The Belgian singing duo Nicole & Hugo were married at Wemmel.
- Born: Jason Keng-Kwin Chan, Malaysian-Australian actor; in Kuala Lumpur

== December 2, 1971 (Thursday) ==
- The United Arab Emirates was founded by the six of the seven Trucial Sheikhdoms (Abu Dhabi, Ajman, Dubai, Fujairah, Sharjah and Umm Al Quwain; Ras Al Khaimah joined later) of the Persian Gulf and the Gulf of Oman. Sheik Zayed bin Sultan Al Nahyan, Emir of Abu Dhabi, was selected as the UAE's first president, and Rashid bin Saeed Al Maktoum, Emir of Dubai, was vice president. Saeed's son, Maktoum bin Rashid Al Maktoum, was named as the prime minister.
- The Mars 3 lander, released by the orbiting Soviet spacecraft of the same name, made the first soft landing on the planet Mars. It began transmitting data to the orbiter on December 5, but failed after only 20 seconds. Scientists quoted in Pravda speculated that the lander had either encountered a dust storm or that there was another problem in the landing area.
- An explosion in Taiwan, fire and carbon monoxide poisoning killed 40 underground coal miners near the port city of Keelung. The blast happened 7,260 feet (2,210 m) below ground in the Seven Star mine.
- Chile's President Salvador Allende decreed emergency rule after riots in the capital, the day after the "March of the Empty Pots" by women in Santiago, injured more than 150 people. Allende authorized General Augusto Pinochet, commander of the Chilean Army garrison in Santiago, to put down the rebellion.
- Alan Enver, a 52-year old hiker who had survived being stranded for six days with his wife Maibritt on a snow-covered mountain in New South Wales in Australia, died when he lost his balance while waving to a rescue helicopter. Mr. Enver and his wife had been hiking in Kosciuszko National Park, with their dog, on November 28 and had gotten lost while on Mount Kosciuszko. They were "walking along a narrow path on the side of a deep gorge" when the RAAF rescue copter came over the ridge, and as Mr. Enver "waved vigorously to the crew to attract attention" he slipped and fell 100 feet (30 m) into a stream below.
- Died: Fred van Deventer, 67, American radio newscaster and game show host who created the popular quiz show Twenty Questions in 1946 on the Mutual Broadcasting System radio network, and later for the DuMont television network. The show debuted on February 2, 1946 and ran until May of 1955.

== December 3, 1971 (Friday) ==
- The Indo-Pakistani War of 1971 began as Pakistan carried out air attacks on at least seven Indian airbases. The next day India launched a massive invasion of East Pakistan.
- A squad of about 200 Pakistani Army troops in East Pakistan began a massacre in six villages on the west bank of the Buriganga River, about 10 miles (16 km) from the Bengali capital of Dhaka, indiscriminately killing thousands of residents, both Hindu and Muslim, and destroying homes.
- The Pakistan Navy submarine PNS Ghazi sank under mysterious circumstances with all 93 personnel onboard. The Indian Armed Forces denied responsibility for the sinking, and its commander, Lieutenant-General J. F. R. Jacob, said that he had first gotten notice in a call from Vice Admiral Krishnan, Commander of the Eastern Naval Command, who investigated reports that fishermen had found floating wreckage. The debris included a lifebelt with the identification "Diablo", the name of a U.S. Navy submarine that had been sold to the Pakistan Navy and renamed PNS Ghazi. Quoting Krishnan, Commander Jacob said that "the sinking of the Ghazi was an act of God" and that the Indian Navy had been unaware that the Ghazi had sunk. Jacob implied that the aircraft carrier INS Vikrant had been the prime target of PNS Ghazi. Indian historians have long claimed that the Indian Navy destroyer INS Rajput (former HMS Rotherham) sank the PNS Ghazi.
- The Bangladesh Air Force, composed of Bengali pilots and technicians defecting from the Pakistan Air Force, launched attacks on depots and communication lines, flying light aircraft donated by India.
- Goodwill Zwelithini kaBhekuzulu was installed as eighth monarch of the Zulus at a traditional ceremony at Nongoma in South Africa, attended by 20,000 people.
- The United States and Canada signed an extradition treaty providing for each nation to return persons wanted for hijacking or for an attack on a diplomat, as a waiver of the traditional "political exclusion clause" used refusing a request for return. U.S. Secretary of State William P. Rogers and Canadian Secretary of State for External Affairs Mitchell Sharp signed on behalf of their respective nations at the U.S. State Department in Washington.
- Krzysztof Penderecki's De Natura Sonoris No 2 was premièred at the Juilliard School of Music in New York.

== December 4, 1971 (Saturday) ==
- The Indian Navy launched a devastating naval offensive, codenamed Operation Trident, a blockade of Karachi, Pakistan's largest city and the home of the Pakistan Naval Headquarters. Led by three Vidyut-class missile boat missile cruisers (INS Nipat, INS Nirghat and INS Veer), each armed with four Soviet-made SS-N-2B Styx missiles, the Indian Navy destroyed four Pakistani ships and the fuel storage tanks in Karachi. INS Nirghat sank the Pakistani destroyer PNS Khaibar with a Styx missile, killing 222 sailors.
- The McGurk's Bar bombing in Belfast killed 15 people and injured 17 others. The pub, patronized by Roman Catholic residents of Belfast, was located in a three-story building that was destroyed when 30 pounds (14 kg) of gelignite were detonated shortly after being placed.
- The Battle of Basantar, concentrated around the city of Shakargarh in Pakistan's Punjab province, began between India's Soviet-made tanks (including the T-55 series) and Pakistan's U.S.-made tanks (including the M60 Patton) and would last for 10 days. Pakistan lost 48 tanks and India lost 13.
- The Montreux Casino, located on the shoreline of Lake Geneva at Montreux, Switzerland, burned down during a Frank Zappa concert, after a concertgoer fired a flare gun into the ceiling, which was covered with rattan, destroying the casino and the equipment of Zappa and his band, The Mothers of Invention. Members of the band Deep Purple, who had planned to do a recording session the next day inside the building, watched as it burned down and later memorialized the event in the classic rock song "Smoke on the Water".

== December 5, 1971 (Sunday) ==
- The Soviet Union vetoed a UN Security Council Resolution, calling for both India and Pakistan to enter an immediate ceasefire and to withdraw their forces from each other's nations. The vote came at about 1:15 in the morning after an eight hour session in which the 10-member Security Council listened to the statements of the representatives for both nations.
- Died: Andrei Andreyev, 76, former member of the ruling Politburo of Soviet Union from 1932 until 1952, when he was demoted along with other associates of Joseph Stalin.

== December 6, 1971 (Monday) ==
- In the United States, the first Auto Train began operating, departing from Lorton, Virginia (a suburb of Washington D.C.) at 8:12 in the evening for a 15-hour trip to Sanford, Florida, at a price of $190 round trip for one car and three passengers. Using the principle of a car ferry, the train carried passengers in luxury style and hauled their automobiles separately as freight. The venture was operated by the Auto-Train Corporation, and used the tracks of the Richmond, Fredericksburg & Potomac line and the Seaboard Coast Line. The first run, which departed 12 minutes late but arrived at 11:00 the next morning as scheduled, carried 95 passengers and only 28 automobiles on its double-decker enclosed cars, but had plans to carry up to 104 autos and more than 400 passengers.
- South Korea's President Park Chung Hee declared a state of national emergency throughout the Asian nation. In a statement read by Chu Yong, his Minister of Culture and Information, Park said that the six-point declaration was made necessary by "the rapid changes in international situations, including the recent admission of Communist China to the United Nations, its effect upon the Korean peninsula and the various fanatic moves by North Korean Communists."
- The U.S. Senate voted, 89 to 1, to confirm Lewis F. Powell as a new Associate Justice of the U.S. Supreme Court to replace the seat vacated by the retirement of Hugo L. Black. The lone vote against Powell, a private attorney in Richmond, Virginia, with no prior judicial experience, was by Senator Fred R. Harris of Oklahoma.
- Born:
  - Richard Krajicek, Dutch tennis player, in Muiderberg
  - Ryan White, American AIDS patient, in Kokomo, Indiana (d. 1990)
- Died: Mathilde Kschessinska, 99, Russian ballerina

== December 7, 1971 (Tuesday) ==
- Libya announced that it was nationalizing all Libyan operations of British Petroleum (BP) after charging that the UK had conspired with Iran to allow the seizure of the islands of Abu Musa and Greater and Lesser Tunbs in the Persian Gulf on November 30. The government, making its announcement on Libyan radio, also said that it was going to withdraw all of its deposits in British banks.
- Shot to death on November 9, the bodies of John List's mother, his wife, and his three teenaged children were discovered in their Westfield, New Jersey, mansion. List, who fled the scene would remain a fugitive for almost 18 years, working under a variety of aliases, before being captured in 1989 after the case was featured in a nationwide broadcast of the relatively new FOX Network show America's Most Wanted.
- Died: Fernando Quiroga y Palacios, 71, Archbishop of Santiago de Compostela

== December 8, 1971 (Wednesday) ==
- The last Australian combat troops to fight in the Vietnam War departed from South Vietnam, as the 4th Battalion, Royal Australian Regiment boarded the aircraft carrier HMAS Sydney at Vungtau and departed. South Vietnam's President Nguyen Van Thieu addressed the troops from the flight deck of Sydney to bid them farewell.
- The Indian Navy launched Operation Python as a follow-up to Operation Trident.
- U.S. President Richard Nixon ordered the 7th Fleet to move towards the Bay of Bengal in the Indian Ocean.
- In Northern Ireland, Sean Russell, an off-duty member of the Ulster Defence Regiment, was shot dead by members of the Irish Republican Army at his home in Belfast, thus becoming the first Catholic member of the Ulster Defense Regiment to be killed in the conflict.
- The Pakistani submarine PNS Hangor sank the Indian frigate INS Khukri

== December 9, 1971 (Thursday) ==
- Indian Air Force planes, attempting to bomb the airport at Dhaka in East Pakistan (now Bangladesh), struck an orphanage instead in an early morning run that had been targeting air and rail transport. At least 350 children were asleep in the Islam Mission Orphanage in Dhaka in an air raid that took place at about 4:00 in the morning local time, burying at least 300 orphans in the rubble of the brick and concrete building. The Indian Air Force also mounted its Meghna Heli Bridge operation to airlift troops of IV Corps of the Indian Army from Brahmanbaria to Raipura and Narsingdi over the Meghna River.
- Died:
  - Ralph Bunche, 68, American political scientist and Nobel Peace Prize laureate
  - Sergey Konenkov, 97, Russian sculptor
  - Iftikhar Janjua, Pakistani general, died when the helicopter he was in was shot down by Indian forces.

== December 10, 1971 (Friday) ==
- The John Sinclair Freedom Rally was held at the University of Michigan, and included John Lennon and Yoko Ono.
- William H. Rehnquist, a controversial nominee made by U.S. President Nixon to the Supreme Court, was confirmed by the U.S. Senate, 68 to 26, to fill the vacancy left by the retirement of the second John Marshall Harlan.
- The Nobel Peace Prize was presented to West Germany's Chancellor, Willy Brandt. Other winners were physicist Dr. Dennis Gabor for his invention of holographic photography, physician Dr. Earl Sutherland, chemist Gerhard Herzberg, economist Simon Kuznets and poet Pablo Neruda.

== December 11, 1971 (Saturday) ==
- Seventeen construction workers were killed in an explosion while boring an underground tunnel beneath Lake Huron near Port Huron, Michigan, and eight more were injured.
- The 2nd Parachute Battalion Group of the Indian Army carried out the Tangail Airdrop, aiming to take Poongli Bridge on the Jamuna and to cut off the retreat of the 93rd Brigade of the Pakistani Army.
- Nihat Erim, who had resigned on December 3 after 13 of his ministers quit, formed a new government.
- The Libertarian Party was created as a third political party in the United States by an 8-member committee that met at the home of Luke Zell in Colorado Springs, Colorado, though the name was not agreed upon until January 31.
- Poland's Communist leader, General Secretary Edward Gierek of the Polish United Workers Party, replaced four older members of the 11-member PUWP Politburo, dismissing President Jozef Cyrankiewicz, Foreign Minister Stefan Jedrychowski, and former Minister of the Interior Mieczyslaw Moczar. They were replaced by younger men, including a future General Secretary, Wojciech Jaruzelski.

== December 12, 1971 (Sunday) ==
- The Soviet Union announced the completion of the world's largest hydroelectric plant, located on the Yenisei River at the town of Divnogorsk, which was specifically built for the construction workers in the project, near Krasnoyarsk.
- Died:
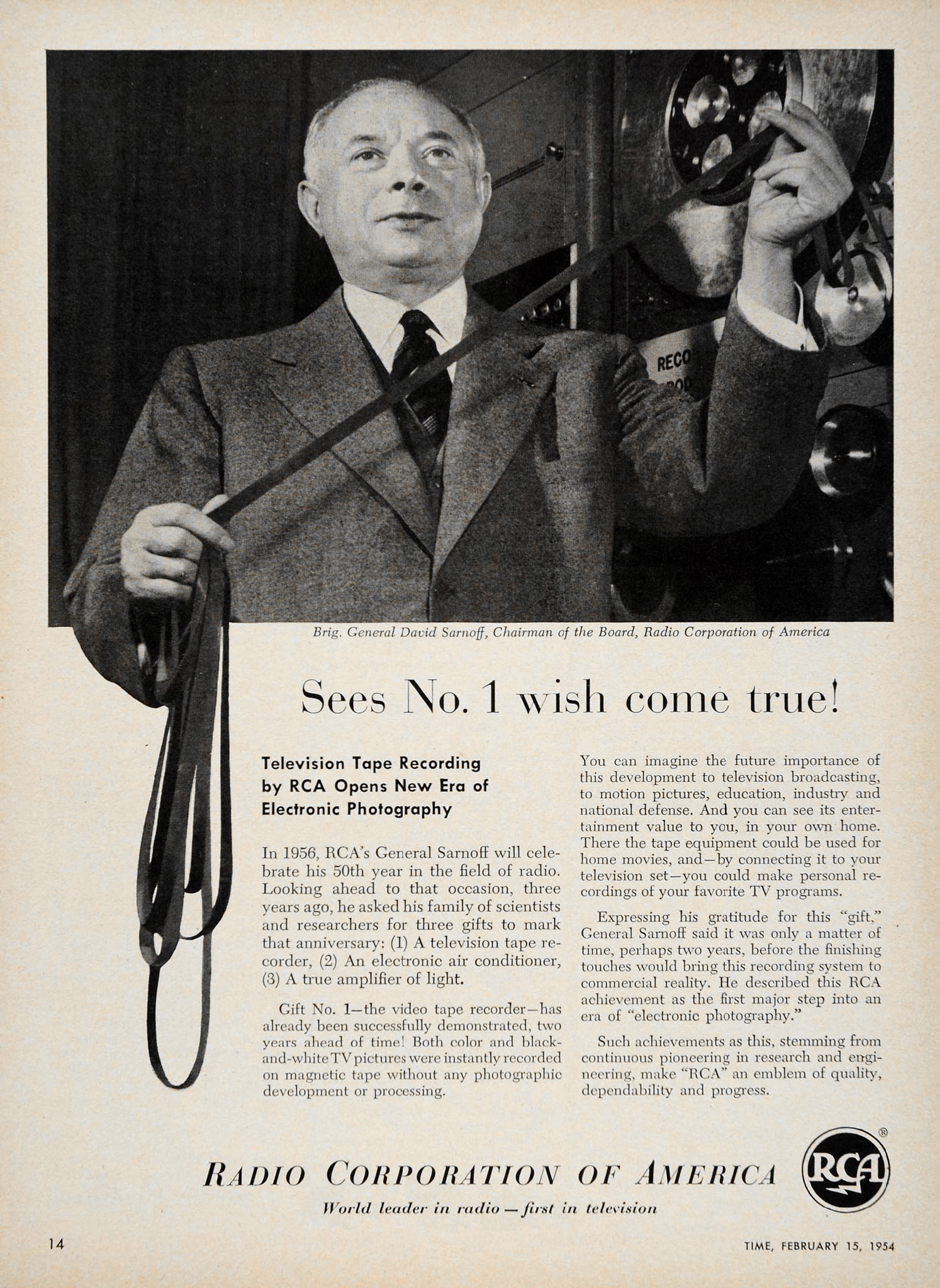
  Sarnoff in 1954 ad
  - David Sarnoff, 80, American broadcasting pioneer who had served as Chairman of RCA (the Radio Corporation of America) and its radio and television subsidiary, NBC (the National Broadcasting Company).
  - John Barnhill, 63, Northern Ireland Senator since 1962, was assassinated in his home at Strabane by a pair of gunmen who shot him, then planted a gelignite bomb beside his body after dragging it into the mansion and detonated it. Barnhill had been an outspoken member of parliament in denouncing the Irish Republican Army.

== December 13, 1971 (Monday) ==
- Richard Fecteau, an American CIA agent who had been held prisoner in the People's Republic of China for 19 years, was allowed to leave the Communist nation along with Mary Ann Harbert, who had been imprisoned for more than three years. The two crossed into neighboring Hong Kong at 2:00 in the afternoon. Another American prisoner, John T. Downey, remained incarcerated, but China announced that his life sentence had been commuted and that he would be released in 1976. The action came after an appeal made by U.S. President Nixon to the Chinese government.
- The Socialist Party of Ireland was formed in Dublin. It would be dissolved in 1982.
- Died: Ivan Hristov Bashev, Bulgarian politician and diplomat, 55, died of exposure and hypothermia after being caught in a snowstorm while skiing on Mount Vitosha

== December 14, 1971 (Tuesday) ==
- Facing defeat by the Army of India, the Pakistan Army and the right-wing Islamist militia Al-Badr carried out the arrest and execution of about 200 Bangladesh professors, physicians, journalists and other Bengali professionals. Among those killed were novelist Shahidullah Kaiser and playwright Munier Choudhury, as well as other people on a list maintained by Pakistani Major General Rao Farman Ali. December 14 is still commemorated in Bangladesh as Shaheed Buddhijibi Dibosh, Martyred Intellectuals Day.
- The remaining members of the East Pakistan regional government, installed from west Pakistan, resigned as Indian troops were preparing to invade the regional capital at Dacca. Dr. A. M. Malik, the last Governor of East Pakistan, "wrote the first draft of his resignation letter for his cabinet to President Yahya Khan with a shaking ballpoint pen on a scrap of office paper as Indian MiG-21's destroyed his official residence, Government House.
- Twenty-nine people were killed in the southern African nation of Zambia while loading railroad freight cars from an explosives factory. The blast caused a chain reaction of nine cars and scattered debris in a radius of 600 feet (180 m).

== December 15, 1971 (Wednesday) ==
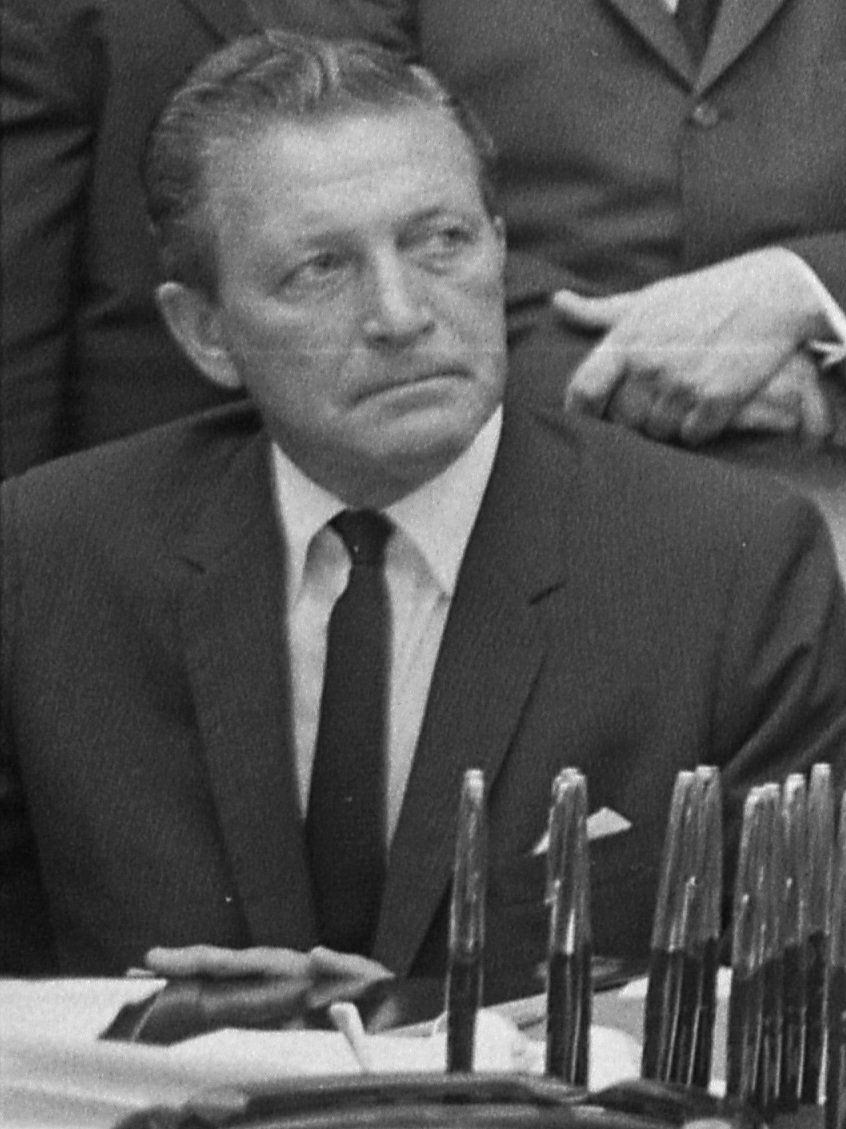
Judge Kerner

- U.S. federal judge Otto Kerner was arrested in Chicago after being indicted on charges of conspiracy, bribery, perjury, mail fraud and income tax evasion, committed between 1962 and 1968 while he was Governor of Illinois.
- Accusing the United Nations Security Council of "legalizing aggression" by failing to pass a resolution for a cease-fire in the India-Pakistan War, Pakistan's Foreign Minister Zulfikar Ali Bhutto walked out of the Council room in tears, and told reporters "I hate this body. I don't want to see their faces again. I'd rather go back to a destroyed Pakistan."
- Born:
  - Clint Lowery, American musician for the heavy metal band Sevendust);in Jacksonville, Florida
  - Jeev Milkha Singh, Indian professional golfer noted for being the first from India to be among the top 100 earners in the world, tied for 9th place in the 2008 PGA Championship; in Chandigarh, Chandigarh union territory
- Died: Paul Lévy, 85, French mathematician

== December 16, 1971 (Thursday) ==
- The Pakistan Armed Forces surrendered to the Joint Forces of Bangladesh (the Mukti Bahini) and the Indian Armed Forces, bringing an end to the Bangladesh Liberation War and the Indo-Pakistani War of 1971. In Dhaka, which fell to India in the morning, the surrender document was signed by The Pakistan Army commander of East Pakistan operations, Lieutenant General A. A. K. Niazi, who had vowed earlier that his troops would fight the Indian forces to the last man, and accepted by the Indian Army commander of India's Eastern Forces, Lieutenant General Jagjit Singh Aurora. The triumph of the former East Pakistan in its quest to become independent of Pakistan is now commemorated on December 16 as the Victory day of Bangladesh and Vijay Diwas in India.
- The United African National Council was set up in Rhodesia as a temporary non-political body under the leadership of Bishop Abel Muzorewa, to oppose the terms of the settlement between Ian Smith and UK Foreign Secretary Alec Douglas-Home.
- David Bowie released his fourth studio album, Hunky Dory.
- Died: Richard Mulcahy, 85, Irish politician

== December 17, 1971 (Friday) ==
- The war between India and Pakistan, already settled in East Pakistan with the surrender of forces there, came to an end in West Pakistan as well as Pakistan's President Yahya Khan announced that he accepted India' proposal for a ceasefire "in the interest of peace and stability on the subcontinent." The statement came one day after he had announced that Pakistan would keep fighting the war. By the time of the ceasefire proposal, Indian forces had captured much of the disputed Azad Kashmir territory claimed by both nations. With India having cleared the way for East Pakistan to become the territory of the Bangladesh government, Yahya Khan belatedly announced a new constitution that would grant autonomy to the eastern section of the nation if it would remain within Pakistan.
- Representatives of the governments of West Germany and East Germany signed "the first major political agreement reached between the two countries since they were established" at a ceremony in Bonn in the Palais Schaumburg, the official residence at the time of the Chancellor of West Germany, Willy Brandt. The Secretary of State in the Chancellery Egon Bahr was signing for West Germany and diplomat Michael Kohl signing for the East. The agreement, previously initialed on December 11 after having been approved on September 3 by the U.S., the UK, the U.S.S.R. and France, eased travel between West Berlin (which was surrounded on all sides by East Germany) and the rest of West Germany.
- The latest James Bond film, Diamonds Are Forever, was released in the US and Denmark.
- Born:
  - Igor Kokoškov, Serbian-born professional basketball coach with 20 years in the U.S. in the National Basketball Association, and (with the Phoenix Suns, the first NBA coach to be born and raised outside of the U.S.); in Banatski Brestovac, SR Serbia, Yugoslavia
  - Chuck Evans, US basketball player, coach, and referee, in Atlanta
  - Alan Khan, South African radio talk show host, in Durban.

== December 18, 1971 (Saturday) ==
- The U.S. dollar was devalued by 8.57% relative to other nations' currencies, as representatives of the western world's 10 leading industrial nations reached an agreement in Washington on revising currency exchange rates. Afterwards, U.S. President Nixon told reporters, "It is my great privilege to announce, on behalf of the finance ministers and the other representatives of the 10 countries involved, the conclusion of the most significant monetary agreement in the history of the world."
- The world's largest hydroelectric plant, located in Krasnoyarsk, in the Russia SFSR in the Soviet Union, began operations.
- U.S. President Richard M. Nixon signed the Wild and Free-Roaming Horses and Burros Act of 1971 into law.
- Three members of the Irish Republican Army (IRA) (James Sheridan, John Bateson and Martin Lee) were killed when a bomb they were carrying exploded prematurely in Magherafelt, County Londonderry.
- Born: Arantxa Sánchez Vicario, Spanish tennis player; in Barcelona
- Died: Bobby Jones, 69, American amateur golfer who won the U.S. Open and the British Open in 1930.

== December 19, 1971 (Sunday) ==
- The made-for-television film The Homecoming: A Christmas Story, was broadcast as the CBS Sunday Night Movie and achieved high enough ratings to be adapted to a long-running television series, The Waltons, where Richard Thomas and Ellen Corby reprised their roles as John-Boy Walton and his grandmother. Other actors who appeared in the film but not on the series were Patricia Neal as the mother Olivia Walton, Edgar Bergen as the grandfather, and Andrew Duggan as the father, and African-American actor Cleavon Little as a stranded traveler taken in by a kind white family. The film and the series were based on the 1961 novel Spencer's Mountain, by Earl Hamner, Jr., about a similar family, the Spencers.

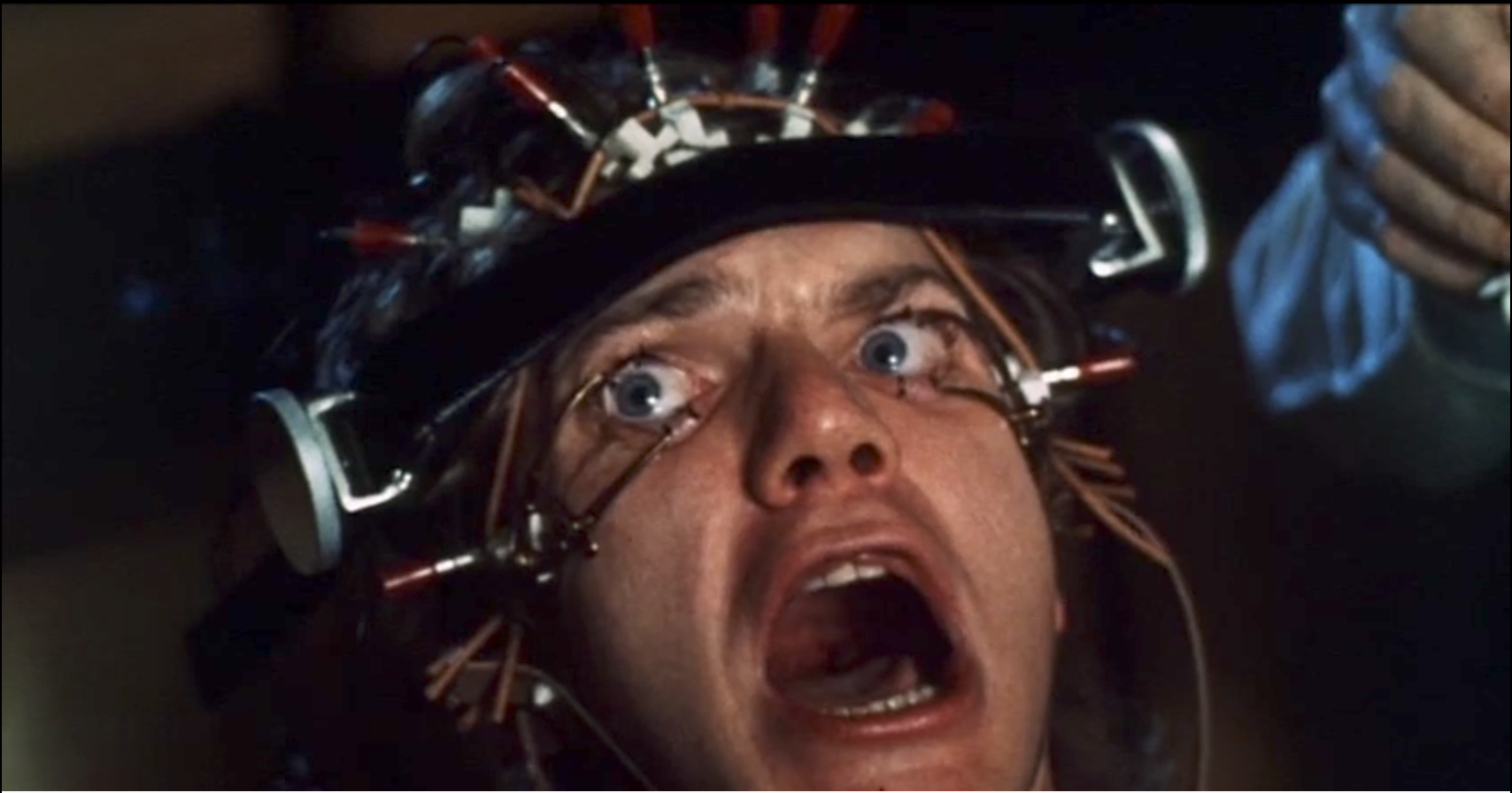
Malcolm McDowell

- Stanley Kubrick's film A Clockwork Orange, based on a 1962 novel by Anthony Burgess, set in the near future and starring Malcolm McDowell, premiered simultaneously in New York City and Toronto, before being generally released in the UK on January 13 and in the rest of the United States on February 2.
- The Clube Atletico Mineiro of Belo Horizonte won the first Brazil soccer football championship, defeating Botafogo of Rio de Janeiro, 1 to 0, as part of a 3-team final tournament that included São Paulo FC Previously, leagues played in various states of Brazil, without interleague competition.

== December 20, 1971 (Monday) ==
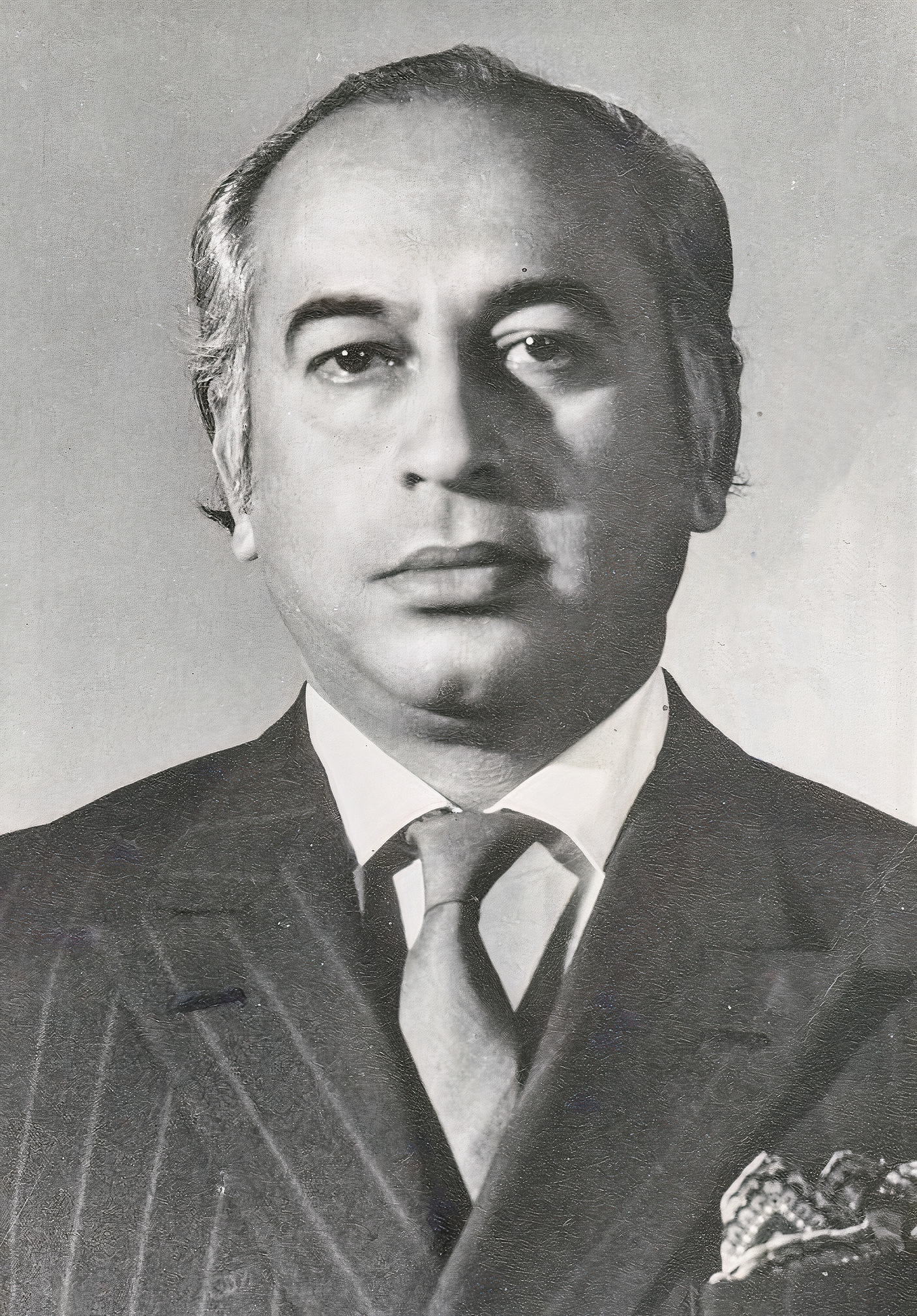
New Pakistani President Bhutto

- Having lost the war with India and the entire eastern part of his nation, General Agha Mohammad Yahya Khan was forced to resign as President of Pakistan and, was replaced by Foreign Minister Zulfikar Ali Bhutto, returning Pakistan to civilian rule for the first time since 1965. Bhutto was also appointed the "Chief Martial-Law Administrator", giving him powers of military and civilian rule. His first act as the Administrator was to order the retirement of General Yahya Khan and six other high ranking Pakistan Army officers whom he described as "the fat and flabby generals" who had lost the war.
- Died:
  - Roy O. Disney, 78, American studio executive and co-founder, with his brother, of The Walt Disney Company
  - Jorge Prat, 53, Chilean politician, former Finance Minister and anti-Marxist presidential candidate, died of a heart attack

== December 21, 1971 (Tuesday) ==
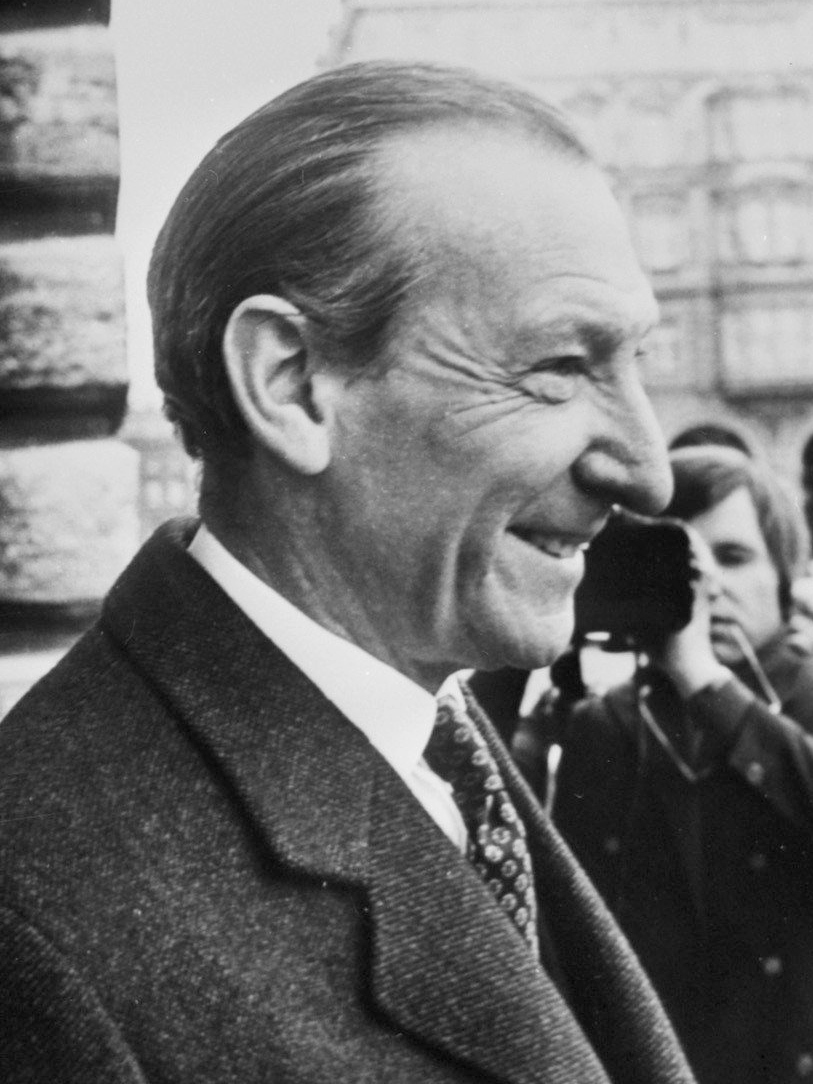
Waldheim

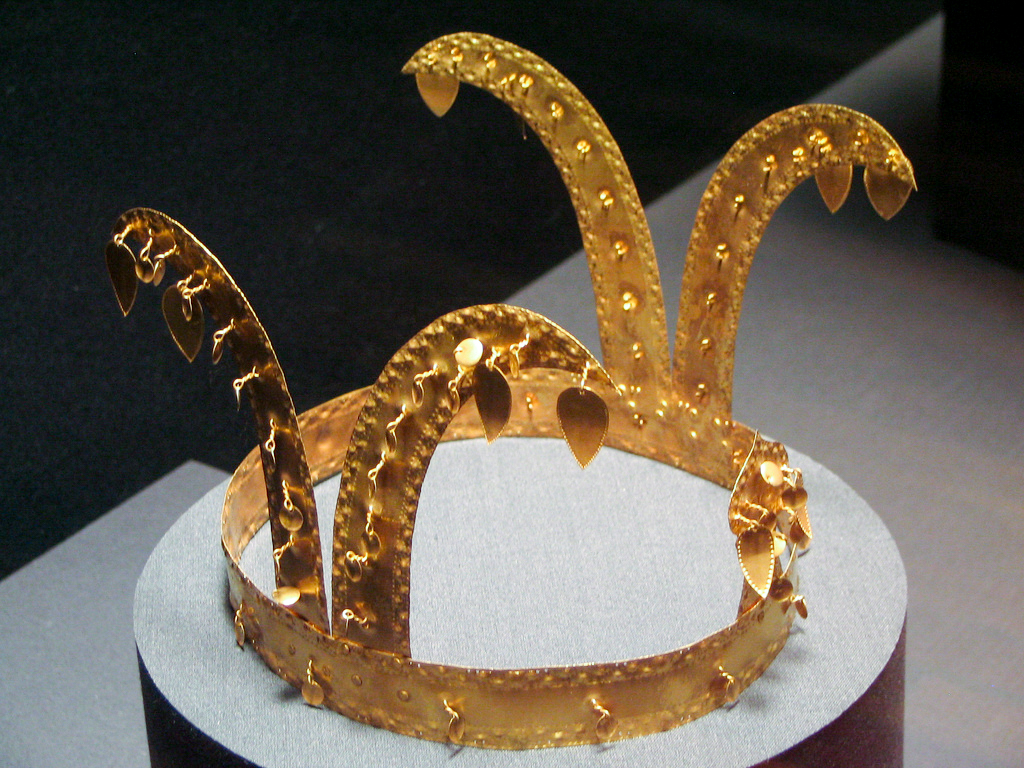
Korea's Crown of Gaya

- The United Nations Security Council approved Kurt Waldheim of Austria as the new Secretary-General of the United Nations, after China withdrew an earlier veto of his nomination. Waldehim's appointment, as the successor to U Thant, who was retiring at year's end, followed four days of voting among candidates from seven nations. Initially, all but one candidate— Gunnar Jarring of Sweden — had been vetoed by at least one of the five permanent members of the Security Council, but Jarring was unable to receive the required three-fifths majority from all 15 members. The final vote was 11 for Waldheim, one against, and three abstentions.
- The crash of a Balkan Bulgarian Airlines airliner killed 28 of the 73 people on board when the Ilyushin Il-16 turboprop fell immediately after takeoff from Sofia for a flight to Algiers. The flight was carrying members of the Sofia Orchestra to a concert tour of Algeria during the New Year's Day holiday. According to one report, the airplane was making its first flight after undergoing extensive maintenance, and the elevator controls had been wired incorrectly, causing the plane to pitch forward when the pilot was attempting to ascend. The dead included the star attraction, popular Bulgarian singer Pasha Hristova, who was 25 years old.
- In hopes of stopping Bangladesh from separating from the rest of Pakistan, President Zulfikar Ali Bhutto appointed a Bengali resident Nurul Amin as his vice president. Nurul Amin had declined an attempt by President Yahya Khan to serve as prime minister earlier in the month. Bhutto also announced that secessionist leader Sheik Mujibur Rahman would be transferred from prison to house arrest.
- The Crown of Gaya, dating from the 6th century AD on the southern coast of the Korean peninsula, was designated a National Treasure of South Korea.
- Born: Brett Scallions, American rock musician (Fuel), in Brownsville, Tennessee

== December 22, 1971 (Wednesday) ==
- Bangladeshi leader Sheikh Mujibur Rahman, who had been incarcerated in a Pakistani prison in Rawalpindi since March 25, was released and transferred house arrest in an undisclosed location.
- At the United Nations, India's Foreign Minister Swaran Singh called on the world's nations to "recognize the reality of Bangladesh", and said that Indian troops would not withdraw from the former East Pakistan until Bangladesh was accepted as an independent nation.
- KUAC-TV in Fairbanks, Alaska went on the air, bringing public broadcasting to Alaska.

== December 23, 1971 (Thursday) ==
- The Ordonnance réglant l'utilisation du nom «Suisse» pour les montres set the legal definition of a “Swiss watch”, as well as the circumstances under which a watch movement could be considered Swiss made.

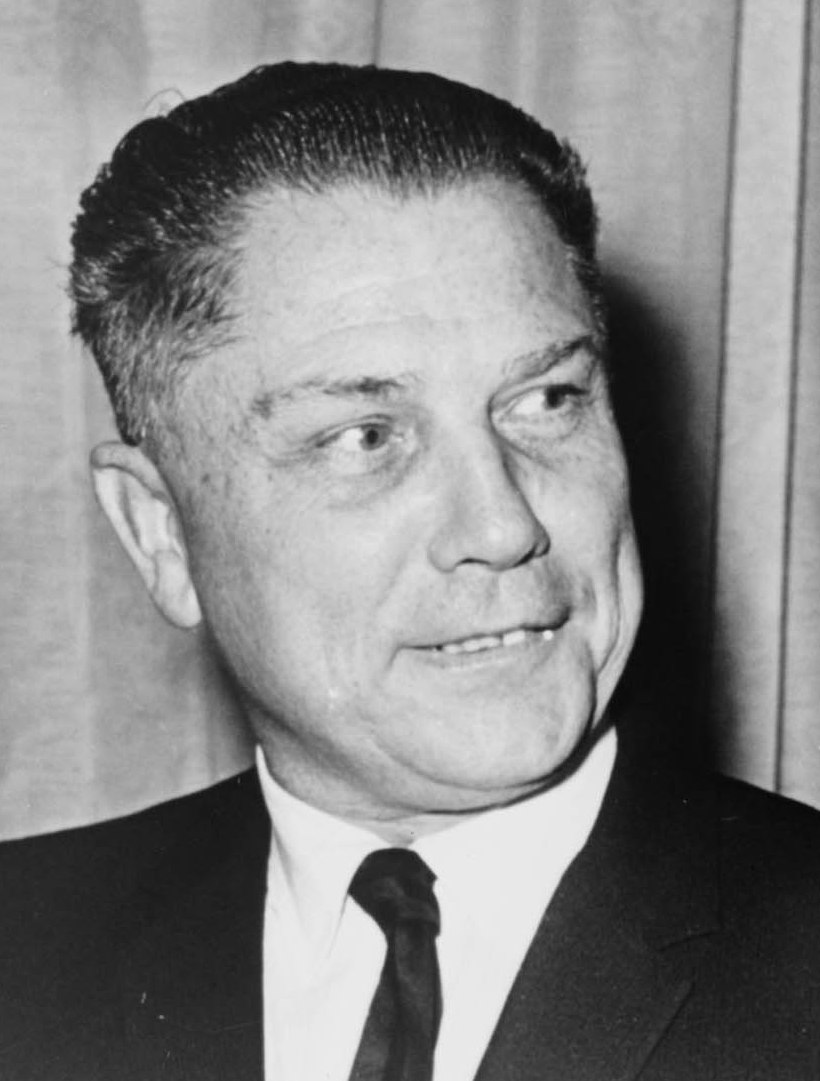
Hoffa

- U.S. President Nixon commuted the 13-year prison sentence of Jimmy Hoffa, the former president of the International Brotherhood of Teamsters, limiting him to time served on condition that he not "engatge in the direct or indirect management of any labor organization" until March 6, 1980, when his sentence would have concluded. Hoffa, who would disappear in 1975, was released from the federal penitentiary in Lewisburg, Pennsylvania after having served four years and 9 1/2 months in jail.
- Born:
  - Corey Haim, Canadian actor, in Toronto (d. 2010)
  - Tara Palmer-Tomkinson, English socialite, in Hampshire

== December 24, 1971 (Friday) ==
- LANSA Flight 508 crashed in a thunderstorm in Peru while en route from Lima to Pucallpa, on a multistop flight to Iquitos, killing 90 of the 91 people aboard. A 17-year-old girl, Juliane Koepcke, survived after falling into the Amazon rainforest while strapped to her seat, and walked through the jungle for the next 10 days until she was rescued by local lumbermen. Those killed in the crash included Juliane's mother, noted ornithologist Maria Koepcke.

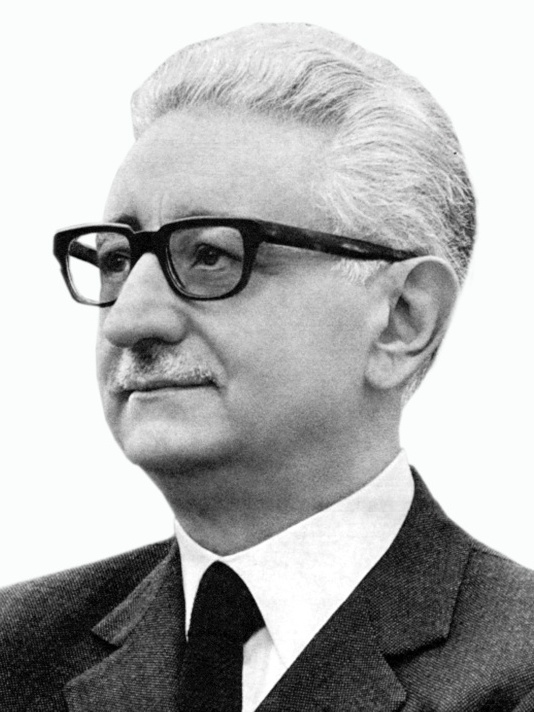
President Leone

- Giovanni Leone was elected President of Italy on the 23rd ballot after 16 days of voting by a 1,008-member electoral college. On the first two ballots, no candidate received the required 505 vote majority. The field of candidates was reduced to Leone, a former Prime Minister; and Pietro Nenni, a former leader of the Italian Socialist Party, after Francesco de Martino withdrew from the race. On the 22nd ballot, Leone received 504 votes, just one short of an absolute majority. In the final vote, Leone had 518 votes and Nenni had 408.
- Born: Ricky Martin, Puerto Rican singer, in San Juan

== December 25, 1971 (Saturday) ==
- A fire killed 158 people at the 22-story Daeyeonggak Hotel in Seoul, South Korea.
- In the longest game in NFL history, the Miami Dolphins beat the Kansas City Chiefs, 27 to 24, in double overtime after 82 minutes and 40 seconds of game time.
- Civil rights activist Jesse Jackson founded the anti-poverty organization "Operation PUSH" (People United to Save Humanity) after an argument with Ralph Abernathy led him to leave the Southern Christian Leadership Conference.
- Born:
  - Justin Trudeau, the 23rd and former Prime Minister of Canada; in Ottawa to Margaret Trudeau and incumbent Prime Minister Pierre Trudeau
  - Dido, English singer (as Dido Florian Cloud de Bounevialle O'Malley Armstrong), in London
- Died: George W. Andrews, 65, U.S. Congressman for Alabama since 1944 and one of the last hardcore segregationists in Congress

== December 26, 1971 (Sunday) ==
- A former U.S. teacher, Patrick Critton, hijacked Air Canada Flight 932 after it took off from Thunder Bay, Ontario on a flight to Toronto, was flown to Cuba as he demanded, and released the crew at the airport in Havana. Police in Cuba arrested Critton and he would spend eight months in a Cuban prison, but Canada's extradition requests were denied. For the next 29 years, Critton lived and worked in Cuba, in the African nation of Tanzania, and, from 1994 to 2001, back in the United States, without assuming a new identity. On September 10, 2001, he was arrested after a Canadian detective Googled the name "Patrick Critton". He would serve almost two years of a five-year prison sentence and then be deported back to the U.S.
- The first reported sighting of the so-called Nullarbor Nymph was made. The story traveled around the world until it was proven to be a hoax in 1972.
- Born: Jared Leto, American actor and musician, in Bossier City, Louisiana
- Died: Robert Lowery, American actor (b. 1913)

== December 27, 1971 (Monday) ==
- The United Arab Emirates Armed Forces was founded a few weeks after the UAE became independent, by order of President Zayed bin Sultan Al Nahyan.
- The first of eight Soyuz-M rockets was launched by the Soviet Union, as part of the Kosmos 470 mission, with the specific payload of a Zenit 4 MT photoreconnaissance satellite. The rockets would continue to be used successfully until 1976.
- Born:
  - Sergei Sergeevich Bodrov, Russian film actor and television host; in Moscow (killed in the Kolka–Karmadon rock ice slide, 2002)
  - Syed Mustafa Kamal, Pakistani politician and Mayor of Karachi from 2005 to 2010.

== December 28, 1971 (Tuesday) ==
- The 26th Amendment of the Constitution of India took effect, abolishing the historic recognition of titles of former rulers of the princely states that had existed in British India until India achieved its independence in 1947, as well as ending privileges and the "privy purse", payments made by the government to former Indian nobility.
- The city of Irvine, California, which would have a population of almost 290,000 people by 2021, was incorporated as a municipality in Orange County.
- "The Dæmons" became the very first Doctor Who serial to be rebroadcast by the BBC complete, in omnibus form. The broadcast attracted 10.5 million viewers, giving the show its highest rating since 1965.

== December 29, 1971 (Wednesday) ==
- A spokesman for the British Ministry of Defence announced that the United Kingdom would withdraw the 3,500 British troops from the Mediterranean island nation of Malta and close its bases after a 170-year presence. The announcement came after Malta's Prime Minister, Dom Mintoff, demanded that the UK pay Malta eleven million dollars for continued use of the naval base and two airfields there.
- Giovanni Leone was sworn in as the 6th President of Italy since the founding of the Italian Republic in 1946. As one of his first acts, Leone rejected the resignation offered by Prime Minister Emilio Colombo and his ministers and asked them to continue.
- Boys in the Sand, the first gay porn film, made its theatrical debut, at the 55th Street Playhouse in New York City.
- Died: John Marshall Harlan II, 72, retired Justice of the U.S. Supreme Court

== December 30, 1971 (Thursday) ==
- In separate statements, Pope Paul VI and the Archbishop of Canterbury, Dr. Michael Ramsey, announced that the Roman Catholic Church and the Anglican Church had reached an agreement on the rite of Holy Communion. The two church leaders approved the issuance of the "Agreed Statement on Eucharistic Doctrine" prepared by the Anglican-Roman Catholic International Commission.
- The Getxo boat club in the Basque region of Spain was attacked by an ETA bomb, the second of three such attacks on the same club over the years.
- Born: Paras, Crown Prince of Nepal, in Kathmandu
- Died: Vikram Sarabhai, 52, Indian physicist and space scientist

== December 31, 1971 (Friday) ==
- U Thant completed his 11-year tenure as Secretary-General of the United Nations.
- The ornate Turgenevskaya station opened on the Moscow subway.

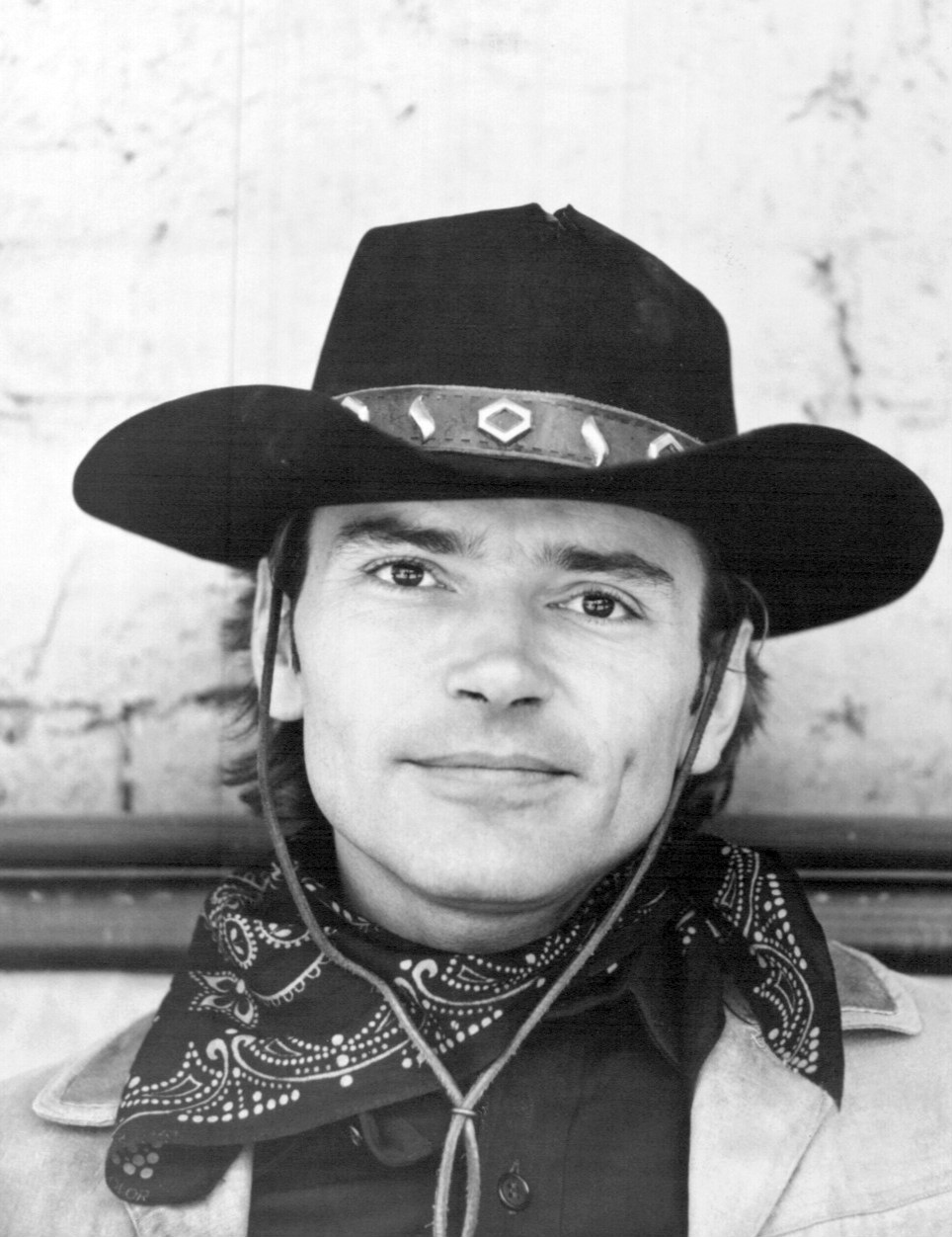
Pete Duel

- Died:
  - Pete Duel, 31, American TV actor and the co-star of the ongoing television series Alias Smith and Jones, shot himself at his home in Hollywood.
  - Marin Sais, 81, American silent film actress.
