= List of elections in 1971 =

The following elections occurred in the year 1971.

== Africa ==
- 1971 Egyptian parliamentary election
- 1971 Egyptian constitutional referendum
- 1971 Liberian general election
- 1971 Malawian general election
- 1971 Mauritanian general election

== Asia ==
- 1971 Egyptian parliamentary election
- 1971 Egyptian constitutional referendum
- 1971 Indonesian legislative election
- 1971 Iranian legislative election
- 1971 Japanese House of Councillors election
- 1971 Kuwaiti general election
- 1971 Nepalese Rastriya Panchayat election
- 1971 North Vietnamese legislative election
- 1971 Philippine Senate election
- 1971 South Korean legislative election
- 1971 South Korean presidential election
- 1971 Syrian presidential election
- 1971 Yemen Arab Republic parliamentary election

=== India ===
- 1971 Indian general election
- 1951–1971 Indian general elections
- Indian general election in Andhra Pradesh, 1971
- Indian general election in Tamil Nadu, 1971
- 1971 Tamil Nadu legislative assembly election

=== South Vietnam ===
- 1971 South Vietnamese presidential election
- 1971 South Vietnamese parliamentary election

== Australia ==
- 1971 Adelaide state by-election
- 1971 Ascot state by-election
- 1971 Kew state by-election
- 1971 Murray by-election
- 1971 New South Wales state election
- 1971 Western Australian state election

== Europe ==
- 1971 Andorran parliamentary election
- 1971 Belgian general election
- 1971 Bulgarian parliamentary election
- 1971 Bulgarian constitutional referendum
- 1971 Czechoslovak parliamentary election
- 1971 Danish parliamentary election
- 1971 Dutch general election
- 1971 East German general election
- 1971 Hungarian parliamentary election
- 1971 Icelandic parliamentary election
- 1971 Italian presidential election
- 1971 Maltese general election
- 1971 Norwegian local elections
- 1971 Slovak parliamentary election
- 1971 Spanish general election
- 1971 Swiss federal election

=== Austria ===
- 1971 Austrian legislative election
- 1971 Austrian presidential election

=== France ===
- 1971 French municipal elections

=== Germany ===
- 1971 East German general election
- 1971 Rhineland-Palatinate state election

=== United Kingdom ===
- 1971 Arundel and Shoreham by-election
- 1971 Bromsgrove by-election
- 1971 Goole by-election
- 1971 Greenwich by-election
- 1971 Hayes and Harlington by-election
- 1971 Liverpool Scotland by-election
- 1971 Macclesfield by-election
- 1971 Southampton Itchen by-election
- 1971 Stirling and Falkirk by-election
- 1971 Ulster Unionist Party leadership election
- 1971 Widnes by-election

==== United Kingdom local ====
===== English local =====
- 1971 Lambeth Council election
- 1971 Lewisham Council election
- 1971 Newham Council election
- 1971 Southwark Council election

== North America ==
- 1971 Honduran general election

=== Canada ===
- 1971 Alberta general election
- 1971 Edmonton municipal election
- 1971 New Democratic Party leadership election
- 1971 Newfoundland general election
- 1971 Ontario general election
- 1971 Progressive Conservative Party of Ontario leadership election
- 1971 Saskatchewan general election

=== Caribbean ===
- 1971 Antigua and Barbuda general election
- 1971 Barbadian general election
- 1971 Haitian referendum
- 1971 Trinidad and Tobago general election

=== United States ===
==== United States lieutenant gubernatorial ====
- 1971 Virginia lieutenant gubernatorial special election

==== United States gubernatorial ====
- 1971 Kentucky gubernatorial election
- 1971 Mississippi gubernatorial election
- 1971 United States gubernatorial elections

==== United States House of Representatives ====
- 1971 South Carolina's 1st congressional district special election
- 1971 United States House of Representatives elections

==== United States mayoral elections ====
- 1971 Baltimore mayoral election
- 1971 Boston mayoral election
- 1971 Chicago mayoral election
- 1971 Cleveland mayoral election
- 1971 Columbus, Ohio mayoral election
- 1971 Evansville, Indiana mayoral election
- 1971 Indianapolis mayoral election
- 1971 Manchester, New Hampshire mayoral election
- 1971 Philadelphia mayoral election
- 1971 San Diego mayoral election
- 1971 San Francisco mayoral election
- 1971 South Bend, Indiana mayoral election
- 1971 Springfield, Massachusetts mayoral election

== Oceania ==
=== Australia ===
- 1971 Adelaide state by-election
- 1971 Ascot state by-election
- 1971 Kew state by-election
- 1971 Murray by-election
- 1971 New South Wales state election
- 1971 Western Australian state election

== South America ==
=== Falkland Islands ===
- 1971 Falkland Islands general election
