= Electoral results for the Division of Murray =

Australian division election results

This is a list of electoral results for the Division of Murray in Australian federal elections from the division's creation in 1949 until its abolition in 2019.

== Members ==
Member	Party	Term
John McEwen	Country	1949–1971
Bruce Lloyd	Country/National Country/Nationals	1971–1996
Sharman Stone	Liberal	1996–2016
Damian Drum	National	2016–2019

== Election results ==
=== Elections in the 2010s ===
==== 2016 ====
2016 Australian federal election: Murray
Party	Candidate	Votes	%	±%
National	Damian Drum	31,105	35.34	+35.34
Liberal	Duncan McGauchie	28,194	32.03	−29.38
Labor	Alan Williams	13,188	14.98	−5.76
Greens	Ian Christoe	3,880	4.41	+0.48
Country	Robert Danieli	3,556	4.04	+4.04
Independent	Fern Summer	3,323	3.78	+3.78
Independent	Andrew Bock	1,467	1.67	+1.67
Rise Up Australia	Yasmin Gunasekera	1,195	1.36	+0.73
Independent	Diane Teasdale	1,037	1.18	+1.18
Independent	Nigel Hicks	844	0.96	+0.96
Citizens Electoral Council	Jeff Davy	227	0.26	−0.10
Total formal votes		88,016	91.16	−2.51
Informal votes		8,530	8.84	+2.51
Turnout		96,546	92.51	−2.04
Notional two-party-preferred count
Liberal	Duncan McGauchie	65,920	74.90	+4.03
Labor	Alan Williams	22,096	25.10	−4.03
Two-candidate-preferred result
National	Damian Drum	48,527	55.13	+55.13
Liberal	Duncan McGauchie	39,489	44.87	−26.00
National gain from Liberal		Swing	N/A	

==== 2013 ====
2013 Australian federal election: Murray
Party	Candidate	Votes	%	±%
Liberal	Sharman Stone	54,490	61.41	−2.78
Labor	Rod Higgins	18,403	20.74	−3.07
Greens	Damien Stevens	3,485	3.93	−2.40
Palmer United	Catriona Thoolen	2,964	3.34	+3.34
Katter's Australian	Michael Bourke	2,423	2.73	+2.73
Sex Party	Tristram Chellew	2,337	2.63	+2.63
Family First	Alan Walker	1,589	1.79	−1.79
Independent	Wendy Buck	1,176	1.33	+1.33
Bullet Train	Fern Summer	986	1.11	+1.11
Rise Up Australia	Raymond Hungerford	563	0.63	+0.63
Citizens Electoral Council	Jeff Davy	316	0.36	−0.20
Total formal votes		88,732	93.67	−0.62
Informal votes		5,992	6.33	+0.62
Turnout		94,724	94.60	+0.06
Two-party-preferred result
Liberal	Sharman Stone	62,882	70.87	+1.29
Labor	Rod Higgins	25,850	29.13	−1.29
Liberal hold		Swing	+1.29	

==== 2010 ====
2010 Australian federal election: Murray
Party	Candidate	Votes	%	±%
Liberal	Sharman Stone	52,337	64.98	+2.91
Labor	Hugh Mortensen	18,842	23.39	−0.72
Greens	Ian Christoe	4,906	6.09	+3.14
Family First	Serena Moore	2,958	3.67	+0.35
Christian Democrats	Ewan McDonald	632	0.78	+0.78
Citizens Electoral Council	Jeff Davy	493	0.61	+0.36
Secular	William Clarke-Hannaford	380	0.47	+0.47
Total formal votes		80,548	94.17	−0.59
Informal votes		4,986	5.83	+0.59
Turnout		85,534	94.81	−0.91
Two-party-preferred result
Liberal	Sharman Stone	56,666	70.35	+2.09
Labor	Hugh Mortensen	23,882	29.65	−2.09
Liberal hold		Swing	+2.09	

=== Elections in the 2000s ===
==== 2007 ====
2007 Australian federal election: Murray
Party	Candidate	Votes	%	±%
Liberal	Sharman Stone	50,021	62.07	−3.46
Labor	Bob Scates	19,429	24.11	+4.34
Independent	Rob Bryant	4,373	5.43	−2.32
Family First	Serena Moore	2,674	3.32	+0.94
Greens	Ian Christoe	2,377	2.95	−0.10
Independent	Diane Teasdale	615	0.76	−0.59
Independent	Paul Merrigan	484	0.60	+0.60
Democrats	Sarina Isgro	416	0.52	+0.52
Citizens Electoral Council	Jeff Davy	203	0.25	+0.08
Total formal votes		80,592	94.76	−1.06
Informal votes		4,461	5.24	+1.06
Turnout		85,053	95.68	−0.09
Two-party-preferred result
Liberal	Sharman Stone	55,015	68.26	−5.82
Labor	Bob Scates	25,577	31.74	+5.82
Liberal hold		Swing	−5.82	

==== 2004 ====
2004 Australian federal election: Murray
Party	Candidate	Votes	%	±%
Liberal	Sharman Stone	52,697	65.53	+1.49
Labor	Norm Kelly	15,899	19.77	−2.04
Independent	Rob Bryant	6,235	7.75	+7.75
Greens	Monica Morgan	2,449	3.05	+0.64
Family First	Janine Madill	1,917	2.38	+2.38
Independent	Diane Teasdale	1,083	1.35	+1.35
Citizens Electoral Council	Elisa Barwick	137	0.17	+0.17
Total formal votes		80,417	95.82	−0.47
Informal votes		3,504	4.18	+0.47
Turnout		83,921	95.77	−0.84
Two-party-preferred result
Liberal	Sharman Stone	59,574	74.08	+2.14
Labor	Norm Kelly	20,843	25.92	−2.14
Liberal hold		Swing	+2.14	

==== 2001 ====
2001 Australian federal election: Murray
Party	Candidate	Votes	%	±%
Liberal	Sharman Stone	53,498	67.24	+7.81
Labor	Alan Calder	16,083	20.21	−0.50
One Nation	Robert Hellemons	3,162	3.97	−2.81
Democrats	Elizabeth Taylor	2,514	3.16	+0.22
Independent	Simon Bush	2,483	3.12	+3.12
Greens	David Jones	1,827	2.30	+0.69
Total formal votes		79,567	96.47	−0.11
Informal votes		2,908	3.53	+0.11
Turnout		82,475	97.25	
Two-party-preferred result
Liberal	Sharman Stone	58,824	73.93	+1.87
Labor	Alan Calder	20,743	26.07	−1.87
Liberal hold		Swing	+1.87	

=== Elections in the 1990s ===
==== 1998 ====
1998 Australian federal election: Murray
Party	Candidate	Votes	%	±%
Liberal	Sharman Stone	46,070	59.43	+16.20
Labor	John Stuart	16,061	20.72	−0.70
Shooters	Geoff Wilson	5,274	6.80	+6.80
One Nation	Robert Hellemons	5,259	6.78	+6.78
Democrats	Ray Cadmore	2,276	2.94	−2.12
Greens	Eleisha Mullane	1,243	1.60	+1.60
Australia First	Diane Teasdale	955	1.23	+1.23
Independent	Nino Marcucci	386	0.50	+0.50
Total formal votes		77,524	96.58	−0.75
Informal votes		2,742	3.42	+0.75
Turnout		80,266	96.05	−0.86
Two-party-preferred result
Liberal	Sharman Stone	55,866	72.06	+18.36
Labor	John Stuart	21,658	27.94	+27.94
Liberal hold		Swing	+18.36	

==== 1996 ====
1996 Australian federal election: Murray
Party	Candidate	Votes	%	±%
Liberal	Sharman Stone	33,565	43.22	+42.09
National	John Walker	23,034	29.66	−36.75
Labor	Bernie Moran	16,635	21.42	−5.20
Democrats	Dennis Lacey	3,924	5.05	+2.44
Natural Law	George Rose	497	0.64	−0.42
Total formal votes		77,655	97.33	−0.20
Informal votes		2,130	2.67	+0.20
Turnout		79,785	96.90	−0.05
Two-party-preferred result
Liberal	Sharman Stone	41,531	53.70	+53.70
National	John Walker	35,814	46.30	−24.20
Liberal gain from National		Swing	+53.70	

==== 1993 ====
1993 Australian federal election: Murray
Party	Candidate	Votes	%	±%
National	Bruce Lloyd	49,506	67.31	+0.70
Labor	John Sheen	19,555	26.59	+5.56
Democrats	Allan Thomson	2,027	2.76	−6.41
Independent	Dennis Lacey	1,678	2.28	+2.28
Natural Law	Sonia Hyland	781	1.06	+1.06
Total formal votes		73,547	97.54	+0.10
Informal votes		1,856	2.46	−0.10
Turnout		75,403	96.95	
Two-party-preferred result
National	Bruce Lloyd	51,767	70.41	−2.86
Labor	John Sheen	21,754	29.59	+2.86
National hold		Swing	−2.86	

==== 1990 ====
1990 Australian federal election: Murray
Party	Candidate	Votes	%	±%
National	Bruce Lloyd	46,901	66.6	+15.8
Labor	Frank Purcell	14,808	21.0	−5.3
Democrats	Barbara Leavesley	6,453	9.2	+5.1
Independent	Anne Adams	2,250	3.2	+3.2
Total formal votes		70,412	97.4	
Informal votes		1,852	2.6	
Turnout		72,264	96.7	
Two-party-preferred result
National	Bruce Lloyd	51,568	73.3	+2.9
Labor	Frank Purcell	18,812	26.7	−2.9
National hold		Swing	+2.9	

=== Elections in the 1980s ===
==== 1987 ====
1987 Australian federal election: Murray
Party	Candidate	Votes	%	±%
National	Bruce Lloyd	32,738	50.8	−7.5
Labor	Mark Anderson	16,919	26.3	+1.7
Liberal	Brendan Norden	9,545	14.8	+2.6
Democrats	Ralph Linford	2,631	4.1	+0.7
Independent	John Hargreaves	2,574	4.0	+4.0
Total formal votes		64,407	95.8	
Informal votes		2,796	4.2	
Turnout		67,203	95.8	
Two-party-preferred result
National	Bruce Lloyd	45,290	70.4	−2.7
Labor	Mark Anderson	19,074	29.6	+2.7
National hold		Swing	−2.7	

==== 1984 ====
1984 Australian federal election: Murray
Party	Candidate	Votes	%	±%
National	Bruce Lloyd	35,681	58.3	+5.2
Labor	Mark Anderson	15,034	24.6	+0.0
Liberal	Anne Adams	7,484	12.2	−5.0
Democrats	John Weir	2,096	3.4	−0.5
Democratic Labor	Desmond Semmel	887	1.4	+1.4
Total formal votes		61,182	93.6	
Informal votes		4,195	6.4	
Turnout		65,377	96.1	
Two-party-preferred result
National	Bruce Lloyd	44,734	73.1	+2.0
Labor	Mark Anderson	16,433	26.9	−2.0
National hold		Swing	+2.0	

==== 1983 ====
1983 Australian federal election: Murray
Party	Candidate	Votes	%	±%
National	Bruce Lloyd	36,433	53.3	+7.1
Labor	Mark Anderson	16,684	24.4	+0.5
Liberal	Anne Adams	11,727	17.2	−5.1
Democrats	John Weir	2,640	3.9	−2.0
Independent	Diane Teasdale	835	1.2	−0.6
Total formal votes		68,319	97.8	
Informal votes		1,506	2.2	
Turnout		69,825	96.8	
Two-party-preferred result
National	Bruce Lloyd		71.3	+3.8
Labor	Mark Anderson		28.7	−3.8
National hold		Swing	+3.8	

==== 1980 ====
1980 Australian federal election: Murray
Party	Candidate	Votes	%	±%
National Country	Bruce Lloyd	30,338	46.2	−6.6
Labor	Joan Groves	15,679	23.9	+6.9
Liberal	Bill Hunter	14,616	22.3	+7.4
Democrats	Douglas Linford	3,856	5.9	−4.7
Independent	Diane Teasdale	1,171	1.8	+1.8
Total formal votes		65,660	97.0	
Informal votes		2,009	3.0	
Turnout		67,669	96.5	
Two-party-preferred result
National Country	Bruce Lloyd	44,323	67.5	+1.3
Labor	Joan Groves	21,337	32.5	−1.3
National Country hold		Swing	+1.3	

=== Elections in the 1970s ===
==== 1977 ====
1977 Australian federal election: Murray
Party	Candidate	Votes	%	±%
National Country	Bruce Lloyd	32,809	52.7	−17.1
Labor	Graeme Macartney	10,573	17.0	−7.3
Liberal	Robert Love	9,230	14.9	+14.9
Democrats	George Murray	6,612	10.6	+10.6
Democratic Labor	Patrick Payne	2,915	4.7	−1.1
Total formal votes		62,139	97.3	
Informal votes		1,749	2.7	
Turnout		63,888	96.8	
Two-party-preferred result
National Country	Bruce Lloyd		76.2	+1.1
Labor	Graeme Macartney		23.8	−1.1
National Country hold		Swing	+1.1	

==== 1975 ====
1975 Australian federal election: Murray
Party	Candidate	Votes	%	±%
National Country	Bruce Lloyd	39,050	69.9	+16.9
Labor	Marjorie Gillies	13,547	24.3	−2.7
Democratic Labor	Patrick Payne	3,239	5.8	+1.2
Total formal votes		55,836	98.1	
Informal votes		1,084	1.9	
Turnout		56,920	97.0	
Two-party-preferred result
National Country	Bruce Lloyd		75.1	+4.9
Labor	Marjorie Gillies		24.9	−4.9
National Country hold		Swing	+4.9	

==== 1974 ====
1974 Australian federal election: Murray
Party	Candidate	Votes	%	±%
Country	Bruce Lloyd	28,475	53.0	+6.9
Labor	Dennis Dodd	14,503	27.0	−3.6
Liberal	Bill Hunter	7,324	13.6	−2.3
Democratic Labor	Patrick Payne	2,460	4.6	−2.7
Australia	Peter Schoeffel	680	1.3	+1.3
Independent	Hugh Dunn	242	0.5	+0.5
Total formal votes		53,684	97.6	
Informal votes		1,299	2.4	
Turnout		54,983	96.1	
Two-party-preferred result
Country	Bruce Lloyd		70.2	+2.8
Labor	Dennis Dodd		29.8	−2.8
Country hold		Swing	+2.8	

==== 1972 ====
1972 Australian federal election: Murray
Party	Candidate	Votes	%	±%
Country	Bruce Lloyd	22,532	46.1	−7.2
Labor	John Riordan	14,958	30.6	+7.4
Liberal	Bill Hunter	7,774	15.9	+15.9
Democratic Labor	Patrick Payne	3,570	7.3	−2.3
Total formal votes		48,834	98.2	
Informal votes		899	1.8	
Turnout		49,733	97.3	
Two-party-preferred result
Country	Bruce Lloyd		67.4	−7.1
Labor	John Riordan		32.6	+7.1
Country hold		Swing	−7.1	

==== 1971 by-election ====
Murray by-election, 1971
Party	Candidate	Votes	%	±%
Country	Bruce Lloyd	19,710	43.0	−10.3
Labor	John Riordan	11,670	25.5	+2.3
Liberal	Bill Hunter	9,622	21.0	+21.0
Democratic Labor	Brian Lacey	4,316	9.4	−0.2
Independent	Matthew Flynn	535	1.2	+1.2
Total formal votes		45,853	97.6	
Informal votes		1,116	2.4	
Turnout		46,969	94.2	
Two-party-preferred result
Country	Bruce Lloyd		71.5	−3.0
Labor	John Riordan		28.5	+3.0
Country hold		Swing	−3.0	

=== Elections in the 1960s ===
==== 1969 ====
1969 Australian federal election: Murray
Party	Candidate	Votes	%	±%
Country	John McEwen	24,450	53.3	−12.7
Labor	Neil Frankland	10,634	23.2	+1.6
Independent	Bill Hunter	6,426	14.0	+14.0
Democratic Labor	Brian Lacey	4,405	9.6	−3.0
Total formal votes		45,915	97.0	
Informal votes		1,427	3.0	
Turnout		47,342	96.9	
Two-party-preferred result
Country	John McEwen		74.5	−2.8
Labor	Neil Frankland		25.5	+2.8
Country hold		Swing	−2.8	

==== 1966 ====
1966 Australian federal election: Murray
Party	Candidate	Votes	%	±%
Country	John McEwen	31,209	66.4	+2.1
Labor	Mervyn Huggins	9,848	21.0	−1.6
Democratic Labor	Brian Lacey	5,927	12.6	−0.4
Total formal votes		46,984	96.8	
Informal votes		1,570	3.2	
Turnout		48,554	96.9	
Two-party-preferred result
Country	John McEwen		77.7	+1.7
Labor	Mervyn Huggins		22.3	−1.7
Country hold		Swing	+1.7	

==== 1963 ====
1963 Australian federal election: Murray
Party	Candidate	Votes	%	±%
Country	John McEwen	29,240	64.3	+2.8
Labor	Neil Frankland	10,292	22.6	−2.6
Democratic Labor	Brian Lacey	5,914	13.0	−0.3
Total formal votes		45,446	98.6	
Informal votes		622	1.4	
Turnout		46,068	97.2	
Two-party-preferred result
Country	John McEwen		76.0	+2.5
Labor	Neil Frankland		24.0	−2.5
Country hold		Swing	+2.5	

==== 1961 ====
1961 Australian federal election: Murray
Party	Candidate	Votes	%	±%
Country	John McEwen	26,773	61.5	−0.3
Labor	Neil Frankland	10,971	25.2	−0.2
Democratic Labor	Brian Lacey	5,784	13.3	+0.5
Total formal votes		43,528	97.8	
Informal votes		982	2.2	
Turnout		44,510	96.6	
Two-party-preferred result
Country	John McEwen		73.5	+0.2
Labor	Neil Frankland		26.5	−0.2
Country hold		Swing	+0.2	

=== Elections in the 1950s ===
==== 1958 ====
1958 Australian federal election: Murray
Party	Candidate	Votes	%	±%
Country	John McEwen	25,710	61.8	+1.1
Labor	Neil Frankland	10,560	25.4	−0.4
Democratic Labor	Brian Lacey	5,303	12.8	−0.7
Total formal votes		41,573	97.5	
Informal votes		1,066	2.5	
Turnout		42,639	96.4	
Two-party-preferred result
Country	John McEwen		73.3	+1.8
Labor	Neil Frankland		26.7	−1.8
Country hold		Swing	+1.8	

==== 1955 ====
1955 Australian federal election: Murray
Party	Candidate	Votes	%	±%
Country	John McEwen	24,192	60.7	−39.3
Labor	James Cameron	10,269	25.8	+25.8
Labor (A-C)	Michael Reilly	5,383	13.5	+13.5
Total formal votes		39,844	97.3	
Informal votes		1,125	2.7	
Turnout		40,969	95.8	
Two-party-preferred result
Country	John McEwen		71.5	−28.5
Labor	James Cameron		28.5	+28.5
Country hold		Swing	−28.5	

==== 1954 ====
1954 Australian federal election: Murray
Party	Candidate	Votes	%	±%
Country	John McEwen	unopposed		
Country hold		Swing		

==== 1951 ====
1951 Australian federal election: Murray
Party	Candidate	Votes	%	±%
Country	John McEwen	23,248	61.0	−2.5
Labor	Gordon Anderson	14,834	39.0	+2.5
Total formal votes		38,082	98.7	
Informal votes		502	1.3	
Turnout		38,584	96.1	
Country hold		Swing	−2.5	

=== Elections in the 1940s ===
==== 1949 ====
1949 Australian federal election: Murray
Party	Candidate	Votes	%	±%
Country	John McEwen	23,778	63.5	+5.7
Labor	Desmond Devlin	13,650	36.5	+1.4
Total formal votes		37,428	98.4	
Informal votes		616	1.6	
Turnout		38,044	95.9	
Country notional hold		Swing	−1.4	
