= 1972 New Hampshire voting age referendum =

- March 7, 1972
- Are you in favor of amending the Constitution to allow eighteen year olds to vote and to provide that no person under twenty-one years of age may hold elective office?
- Outcome: Amendment not adopted (failed to reach two-thirds threshold)

Results
Choice	Votes	%
Yes	131,399	65.98%
No	67,744	34.02%
Valid votes	199,143	100.00%
Invalid or blank votes	0	0.00%
Total votes	199,143	100.00%
Municipality results
Yes
90–100%
80–90%
70–80%
60–70%
50–60%
No
60–70%

A legislatively-referred constitutional referendum was held in the U.S. state of New Hampshire on March 7, 1972 alongside the presidential primary. The proposed amendment would have lowered the state's voting age to eighteen years (which had already been accomplished federally the year prior by the 26th Amendment) and raised the minimum age to hold elective office to twenty-one years. The proposal failed to pass after it did not receive a two-thirds majority vote. The referendum was criticized for being vague, with the editorial board of The Portsmouth Herald calling the question a 'monstrosity'. Two years later, a second 18-year-old voting rights amendment was approved by 71.8 percent of voters.
