= Carme Travesset =

Andorran suffragist (1925–2022)

- Born: 21 June 1925; Sant Julià de Lòria, Andorra
- Died: 15 August 2022 (aged 97); Escaldes–Engordany, Andorra
- Occupations: Municipal councillor Teacher
- Known for: First Andorran woman to hold elected office
- Spouse: Fidel Aparicio Santos

Carme Travesset i Travesset (21 June 1925 – 15 August 2022) was an Andorran suffragist and teacher. In 1973, she became the first woman in Andorra to hold elected office when she was voted to serve on the municipal council of Escaldes–Engordany.

== Biography ==
Travesset was born on 21 June 1926 in Sant Julià de Lòria, Andorra, the daughter of Josep Travesset Gispert and Emilia Travesset Julià. She had two sisters, Josefina and Assumpta. She married Fidel Aparicio Santos, who was originally from Palencia in Spain; they remained married until his death in 1992.

After finishing her education, Travesset moved to Prades, France, where she trained as a French teacher. Upon qualifying, she returned to Andorra, teaching at a French-language school in Encamp for four years. Travesset then moved to a French school in Escaldes–Engordany, where she worked until she retired in 1995, eventually becoming the school's principal. In the local community, she was known as Madame Aparicio. For her role as a prominent French language teacher in Andorra, Travesset was awarded the Ordre des Palmes académiques from the French government.

== Activism ==
Travesset was a member of the Andorran women's rights movement calling for equality between men and women. In 1948, she became the first woman in Andorra to obtain a driver's licence, although it was known that at least two women had driven before her, albeit illegally. Travesset was among 370 women who presented a petition to the General Council in 1969 demanding that voting rights be extended to women. She expressed her personal philosophy, writing "we are equal between men and women" (Catalan: Som iguals entre dones i homes); she believed that men were resistant to women receiving the vote due to them not wanting to be "among women" at the legislative level. Women were granted the vote in 1970, and were first able to exercise their newfound right in the 1971 Andorran parliamentary election.

Following this, pressure was put on the government to allow women to run for elected office. This was also passed by the General Council. In the 1973 local elections, Travesset became the first woman in Andorra to hold elected office when she was elected to serve on the municipal council of Escaldes–Engordany. Due to protocol stating that elected officials (up to that point, exclusively male) had to wear black ties during their inaugurations, Travesset wore a black bow tie around her neck during her swearing-in on 28 December 1973.

== Death and legacy ==
Travesset died on 15 August 2022 at the age of 97. She was buried on 17 August at her family's plot.

Xavier Espot Zamora, the Prime Minister of Andorra, expressed his condolences following Travesset's death, calling her a "brave woman committed to the fight for women's rights". Former Prime Minister Antoni Martí also released a statement, describing her as a "great teacher and a fabulous person".

La Poste, Andorra's postal service, released a commemorative stamp in honour of Travesset in June 2024 to mark what would have been her 99th birthday.

In 2025, Travesset was among several female activists commemorated across Andorra to mark 55 years of women's suffrage in the country.
