= 2002 Maryland Comptroller election =

- November 5, 2002
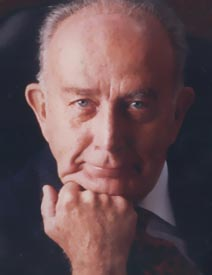

Nominee	William Donald Schaefer	Eugene Robert Zarwell
Party	Democratic	Republican
Popular vote	1,125,279	522,785
Percentage	67.64%	31.56%
- County results Schaefer: 50–60% 60–70% 70–80% 80–90% Zarwell: 50–60%
Comptroller before election
William Donald Schaefer
Democratic
Elected Comptroller
William Donald Schaefer
Democratic

The 2002 Maryland comptroller election was held on November 5, 2002, in order to elect the comptroller of Maryland. Democratic nominee and incumbent comptroller William Donald Schaefer defeated Republican nominee Eugene Robert Zarwell.

== General election ==
On election day, November 5, 2002, Democratic nominee William Donald Schaefer won re-election by a margin of 602,494 votes against his opponent Republican nominee Eugene Robert Zarwell, thereby retaining Democratic control over the office of comptroller. Schaefer was sworn in for his second term on January 3, 2003.

=== Results ===
Maryland Comptroller election, 2002
Party	Candidate	Votes	%
Democratic	William Donald Schaefer (incumbent)	1,125,279	67.94
Republican	Eugene Robert Zarwell	522,785	31.56
Write-in		8,343	0.50
Total votes		1,656,407	100.00
Democratic hold			
