= 1970 United States elections =

- ← 1968 1969 1970 1971 1972 → Midterm elections
- Election day: November 3
- Incumbent president: ▌Richard Nixon (R)
- Next Congress: 92nd

Senate elections
- Overall control: Democratic hold
- Seats contested: 35 of 100 seats (33 seats of Class 1 + 2 special elections)
- Net seat change: Republican +1
- 1970 Senate election results Democratic hold Democratic gain Republican hold Republican gain Conservative gain Independent gain

House elections
- Overall control: Democratic hold
- Seats contested: All 435 voting seats
- Popular vote margin: Democratic +8.7%
- Net seat change: Democratic +12
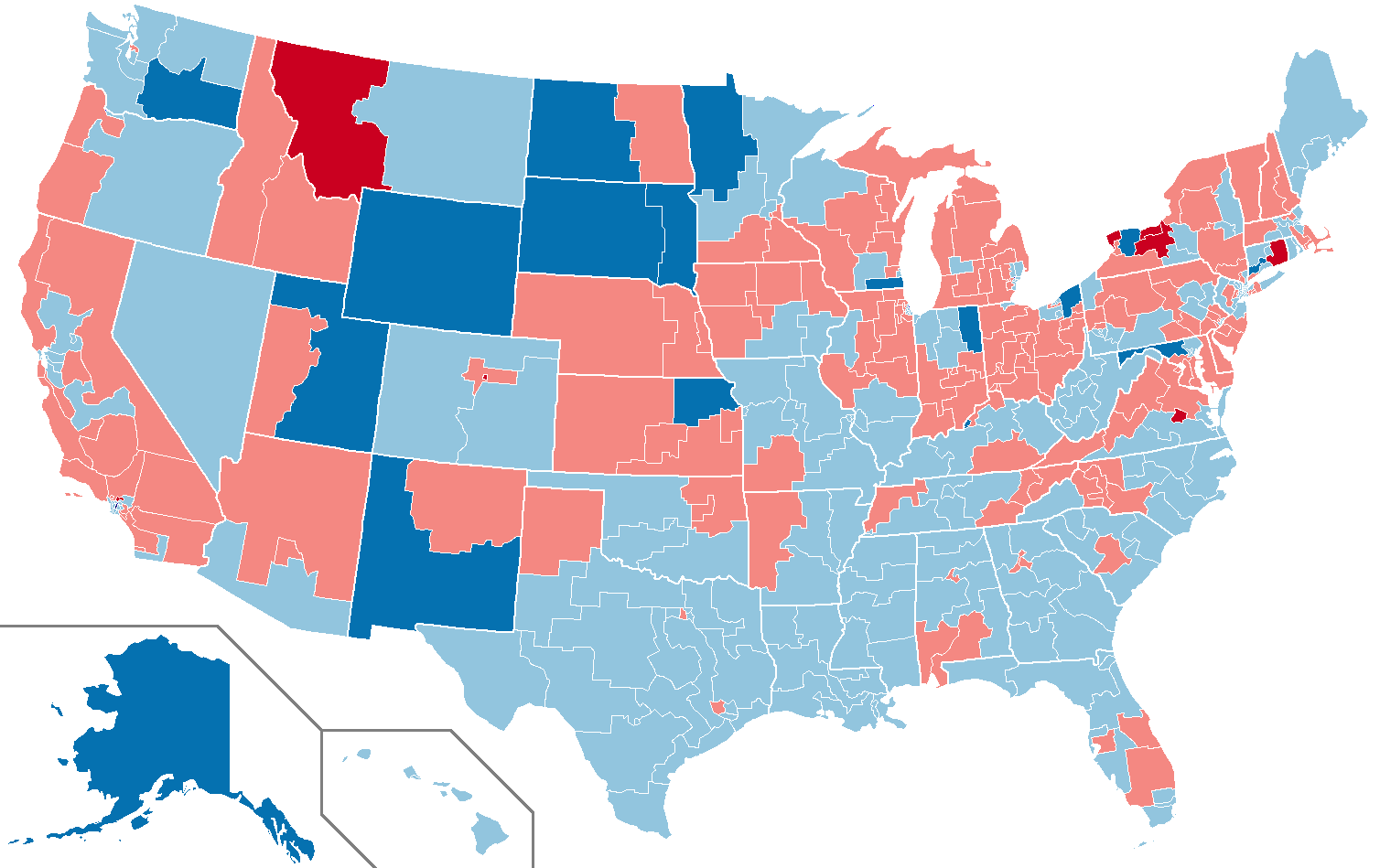
- 1970 House of Representatives election results Democratic hold Democratic gain Republican hold Republican gain

Gubernatorial elections
- Seats contested: 37 (35 states, 2 territories)
- Net seat change: Democratic +11
- 1970 gubernatorial election results Territorial races not shown Democratic hold Democratic gain Republican hold Republican gain

Elections were held on November 3, 1970, and elected the members of the 92nd United States Congress. The election took place during the Vietnam War, in the middle of Republican President Richard Nixon's first term. The Democratic Party defended its control of Congress by retaining its Senate majority and increasing its majority in the House of Representatives.

In the House of Representatives, the Democrats picked up twelve seats at the expense of the Republican Party. In the Senate, Republicans picked up two seats, and James L. Buckley won the election as a member of the Conservative Party of New York. He is the most recent individual to win election to the Senate as a member of a third party and remain affiliated with that party after the election. Democrats also gained a net 11 governorships and maintained majorities in state legislatures.

Nixon and Vice President Spiro Agnew campaigned heavily for Republican candidates, with Nixon encouraging voters to respond to anti-war and civil rights activists by voting the Republican ticket. In an October speech, he declared, "My friends, I say that the answer to those that engage in disruption--to those that shout their filthy slogans, to those that try to shout down speakers--is not to answer in kind, but go to the polls on election day, and in the quiet of that ballot box, stand up and be counted: the great silent majority of America."

This was the first time that Republicans gained Senate seats while losing House seats in a midterm, which also later occurred in 2018. Democrats did this in 1914 and 1962 as well.

This election saw future president Jimmy Carter win the election to the governorship in Georgia.

== See also ==
- 1970 United States House of Representatives elections
- 1970 United States Senate elections
- 1970 United States gubernatorial elections
- 1970 in the United States
