= 1990 Maryland gubernatorial election =

- November 6, 1990
- Turnout: 54.85%
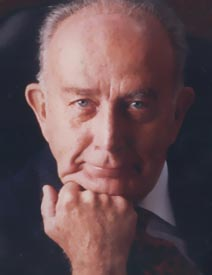

Nominee	William Donald Schaefer	William S. Shepard
Party	Democratic	Republican
Running mate	Melvin Steinberg	Lois Shepard
Popular vote	664,015	446,980
Percentage	59.76%	40.23%
- County results Schaefer: 50–60% 60–70% 70–80% Shepard: 50–60% 60–70%
Governor before election
William Donald Schaefer
Democratic
Elected Governor
William Donald Schaefer
Democratic

The 1990 Maryland gubernatorial election was held on November 6, 1990. Incumbent Democrat William Donald Schaefer defeated Republican nominee William S. Shepard handily (59.76% to 40.23%).

== Primary elections ==
Primary elections were held on September 11, 1990.

=== Democratic primary ===
==== Candidates ====
- William Donald Schaefer, incumbent Governor
- Frederick M. Grisser Jr., LaRouche Activist

==== Results ====
Democratic primary results
Party	Candidate	Votes	%
Democratic	William Donald Schaefer (incumbent)	358,534	78.05
Democratic	Frederick M. Grisser Jr.	100,816	21.95
Total votes		459,350	100.00

=== Republican primary ===
==== Candidates ====
- William S. Shepard, diplomat
- Ross Zimmerman Pierpont, perennial candidate

==== Results ====
Republican primary results
Party	Candidate	Votes	%
Republican	William S. Shepard	66,966	52.72
Republican	Ross Zimmerman Pierpont	60,065	47.28
Total votes		127,031	100.00

== General election ==
=== Candidates ===
- William Donald Schaefer, Democratic
- William S. Shepard, Republican

=== Results ===
1990 Maryland gubernatorial election
Party	Candidate	Votes	%	±%
Democratic	William Donald Schaefer (incumbent)	664,015	59.76%	−22.61%
Republican	William S. Shepard	446,980	40.23%	+22.60%
Majority		217,035		
Turnout		1,111,088		
Democratic hold		Swing		
