= National Indigenous Australians Agency =

Federal Indigenous affairs agency in Australia

Agency overview
- Formed: 1 July 2019
- Jurisdiction: Australian Government
- Minister responsible: Malarndirri McCarthy, Minister for Indigenous Australians
- Agency executive: Julie-Ann Guivarra, CEO
- Parent department: Department of the Prime Minister and Cabinet
- Website: Official website

The National Indigenous Australians Agency (NIAA) is an Australian Public Service agency of the Australian Government. It is responsible for whole-of-government coordination of policy development, program design, and service delivery for Aboriginal Australians and Torres Strait Islander people, who are grouped under the term Indigenous Australians.

Created in July 2019, under then Prime Minister Scott Morrison, the Agency is responsible to the Minister for Indigenous Australians, Malarndirri McCarthy and is an executive agency of the Department of the Prime Minister and Cabinet, replacing the Department's Indigenous Affairs Group. The inaugural Chief Executive Officer was retired Vice Chief of the Defence Force, Ray Griggs. Julie-Ann Guivarra became the CEO on 1 December 2025.

== History ==
The agency was first announced by Prime Minister Scott Morrison on 26 May 2019 after the return of the Liberal-National Coalition to government at the 2019 federal election. Morrison announced a ministerial reshuffle and machinery of government changes, which elevated Ken Wyatt into cabinet as the Minister for Indigenous Australians, and the creation of the National Indigenous Australians Agency within the Department of the Prime Minister and Cabinet, replacing the Indigenous Affairs Group within the department.

The National Indigenous Australians Agency was listed in the Commonwealth of Australia Gazette on 29 May 2019, to be formally established on 1 July 2019 under the Public Service Act 1999.

== Governance and responsibilities ==
The National Indigenous Australians Agency is responsible to the Minister for Indigenous Australians and is an executive agency of the Department of the Prime Minister and Cabinet. It is an internal government agency accountable to the executive government.

As outlined in the Order, the Agency is responsible for leading and coordinating policy development, program design and implementation and service delivery for Aboriginal and Torres Strait Islander people and providing advice to the Prime Minister and Minister for Indigenous Affairs on whole-of-government priorities. The agency is also responsible for the promotion of reconciliation, the Closing the Gap strategy, and monitoring and evaluation of programs.

== Structure and staffing ==
The NIAA is led by a CEO, Julie-Ann Guivarra, and two Deputy CEOs each with distinct responsibilities.

The NIAA has staff working across Australia, with 41 per cent of staff located outside Canberra in other capital cities and regional and remote areas.

== See also ==
- Indigenous Advisory Council (2013-2019)
