= Aborigines in White Australia =

1974 book

- Author: Sharman Stone
- Publication date: 1974
- ISBN: 0-85859-072-7

Aborigines in White Australia is a 1974 book by Sharman Stone. It is a compilation of historical documents regarding the changing attitudes of white people, especially white Australians, towards indigenous Australians. It covers the period from 1697 to 1973.

The historical documents are drawn from contemporary newspapers, court and government records, official reports, private journals and lectures. They illustrate a broad range of attitudes to indigenous people held by white Australians, including fear, racism, anthropological interest, paternalism and guilt.

Aborigines in White Australia was published by Heinemann Educational Australia in Melbourne and London. It was assigned ISBN 0-85859-072-7 (in Australia) and ISBN 0-435-32830-1 (in the UK).
