= Douglas Maxwell Stone =

Australian geologist (born 1948)

Douglas Maxwell Stone (born 26 June 1948) is an Australian geologist, author, publisher, farmer and businessman. He was born in Kew, Victoria, and is the son of Lawrie Phillip Stone and Josephine Alexander Proctor. He is manager of Outdoor Press, and a farmer on the property known as Granite Springs, Kelvin View, Victoria. He is an author of numerous publications on geology, gold prospecting, and maps (in particular of Victoria).

Over a number of years Stone has written many books on Australian gold prospecting, gemstones, minerals and fossils. He spent 20 years with the Geological Survey of Victoria, initially as a field officer before becoming the editor of the Mining and Geological Journal. In 1976 he started his own publishing business - Outdoor Press. With the introduction of metal detectors onto the Australian Goldfields in 1977 a new "gold boom" was sparked and he has been chasing gold ever since - as a prospector, tour operator, consultant, researcher and author.

== Sources ==
- Avoca Advocate, March 1995.
- Outdoor Press website, https://web.archive.org/web/20120425050531/http://outdoorpress.com.au/

== Publications ==
- Abele, C., and Douglas M. Stone. Geology of the Anglesea area, central coastal Victoria. Melbourne, 1979.
- Bawden, Sharman, and Douglas M. Stone. Australian gemstones. Sydney, 1970.
- Duff, John S., K. R. Garland, and Douglas M. Stone. Saltland in Victoria. Rev. ed. [Wodonga, Vic.]: Victorian Irrigation Research and Promotion Organisation, 1986.
- Garland, K. R., John S. Duff, Douglas M. Stone, and Victorian Irrigation Research and Promotion Organisation. Saltland in Victoria. [Wodonga, Vic.]: Victorian Irrigation Research and Promotion Organisation, 1981.
- Lai, K. K., Douglas M. Stone, and R. T. Hattersley. By-Wash spillways for farm dams. Manly Vale, N.S.W.: Water Research Laboratory, University of New South Wales, 1965.
- Lawrence, C. R., Douglas M. Stone, and Geological Survey of Victoria. Geology, hydrodynamics and hydrochemistry of the southern Murray basin. 2 vols. [Melbourne]: Mines Dept., 1975.
- Lawrence, C. R., Douglas M. Stone. Geology, hydrodynamics and hydrochemistry of the southern Murray basin. 2 vols, Memoir (Geological Survey of Victoria); 30. [Melbourne]: Mines Dept., 1975.
- Phipps, Maurice, and Douglas Stone. Canoeing in Australia. Lilydale, Vic.: Pioneer Design Studio, 1976.
- Stone, Derrick I., and Douglas Stone. How to find Australian gemstones. [Melbourne]: Periwinkle Books, 1969.
- Stone, Derrick I., and Douglas Stone. Gold prospecting, Periwinkle colour series. Melbourne: Periwinkle Books, 1970.
- Stone, Douglas, and Greg Dunnett. Discover Victoria's goldfield heritage : Ballarat, Bendigo, Castlemaine, Stawell. Burwood, Vic.: See Australia Guides, 1993.
- Stone, Douglas, Greg Dunnett, and Derrick I. Stone. Explore the great ocean road : along Australia's southern touring route, Geelong to Mt. Gambier. Lilydale, Vic.: See Australia Guides, 1991.
- Stone, Douglas, Greg Dunnett, and Derrick I. Stone. Explore the Great Ocean Road : Geelong to Mt. Gambier. Rev. ed. Healesville, Vic.: See Australia Guides, 1997.
- Stone, Douglas M. A wave-recording network for Australia. Manly Vale, N.S.W.: Water Research Laboratory, University of New South Wales, 1969.
- Stone, Douglas M. Where to find Queensland gemstones. Yarra Glen, Vic.: Pioneer, 1975.
- Stone, Douglas M. Gold prospecting. Lilydale, Vic: Outdoor Press, 1977.
- Stone, Douglas M. Gold prospecting. New enlarged ed, 1988.
- Stone, Douglas M. "Gold & relic sites : metal detecting map with notes. Ararat goldfield." Shepparton [Vic.]: Outdoor Press, 1999.
- Stone, Douglas M. "Gold & relic sites : metal detecting map with notes. Moonambel Redbank goldfield." Shepparton, [Vic.]: Outdoor Press, 1999.
- Stone, Douglas M. "Gold & relic sites : metal detecting map with notes. St Arnaud goldfield." Shepparton, [Vic.]: Outdoor Press, 1999.
- Stone, Douglas M. "Gold & relic sites : metal detecting map with notes. Stuart Mill goldfield." Shepparton, [Vic.]: Outdoor Press, 1999.
- Stone, Douglas M. Gold prospecting. New enl. ed. Shepparton, Vic.: Outdoor Press, 1999.
- Stone, Douglas M., G. Abele, and D. Spencer. Geology of the Anglesea area, central coastal Victoria. [Melbourne]: Dept. of Minerals and Energy, 1979.
- Stone, Douglas M., and Robert Butt. Where to find Australian minerals, Periwinkle colour guides. Melbourne: Lansdowne, 1972.
- Stone, Douglas M., and Robert Butt. Where to find Australian minerals. Melbourne: Lansdowne, 1972.
- Stone, Douglas M., and Robert A. Butt. A guide to Australian precious opal. Melbourne: Periwinkle Books, 1972.
- Stone, Douglas M., and Robert A. Butt. A guide to Australian precious opal. rev. ed, Periwinkle guide. Sydney: Periwinkle Books, 1976.
- Stone, Douglas M., and Robert A. Butt. Where to find Australian minerals. 2nd ed, Periwinkle guide, 1977.
- Stone, Douglas M., Bob Sargent, and Sharman Stone. Metal detecting for gold & relics in Australia. Lilydale, Vic.: Outdoor Press, 1980.
- Stone, Douglas M., and Derrick I. Stone. Golden stamp book of Australian fossils, Australian golden stamp book. Gladesville, N.S.W.: Golden Press, 1973.
- Stone, Douglas M., and Derrick I. Stone. How to find Australian gemstones, Periwinkle guide. Dee Why West, N.S.W.: Periwinkle Books, 1977.
- Stone, Douglas M., and Sharman Stone. Australian sea shells : [a guide to collecting Australian sea shells]. Sydney: Golden Press, 1975.
- Stone, Douglas M., and Sharman Stone. Australian fossils, An Australian nature guide. [Windsor, Vic.]: Budget Books in association with Lloyd O'Neil, 1979.
- Stone, Douglas M., Sharman Stone, and Bob Sargent. Metal detecting for gold & relics in Australia. Lilydale, Vic.: Outdoor Press, 1980.
- Stone, Douglas M., and Sharman Stone. Australian fossils, Australian golden pocket guide. Sydney: Golden Press, 1975.
- Stone, Douglas M., and Sharman Stone. Australian fossils. South Yarra, Vic.: Lloyd O'Neil for Currey O'Neil, 1983.
- Stone, Douglas M., Sharman Stone, and Bob Sargent. Metal detecting for gold & relics in Australia. Rev. ed. Burwood, Vic: Outdoor Press, 1991.
- Stone, Douglas M., Beach stability in Lake Macquarie entrance. [Manly Vale, N.S.W.]: University of New South Wales, Water Research Laboratory, 1964.
- Stone, Douglas M., John Wilson, Rich Richardson, Derrick I. Stone, and Arthur Wigley. Rock and mineral formation, Australian nature library. Melbourne: Lansdowne, 1972.
