= Sharman Stone =

Australian politician (1951–2026)

The Honourable Sharman Stone AM
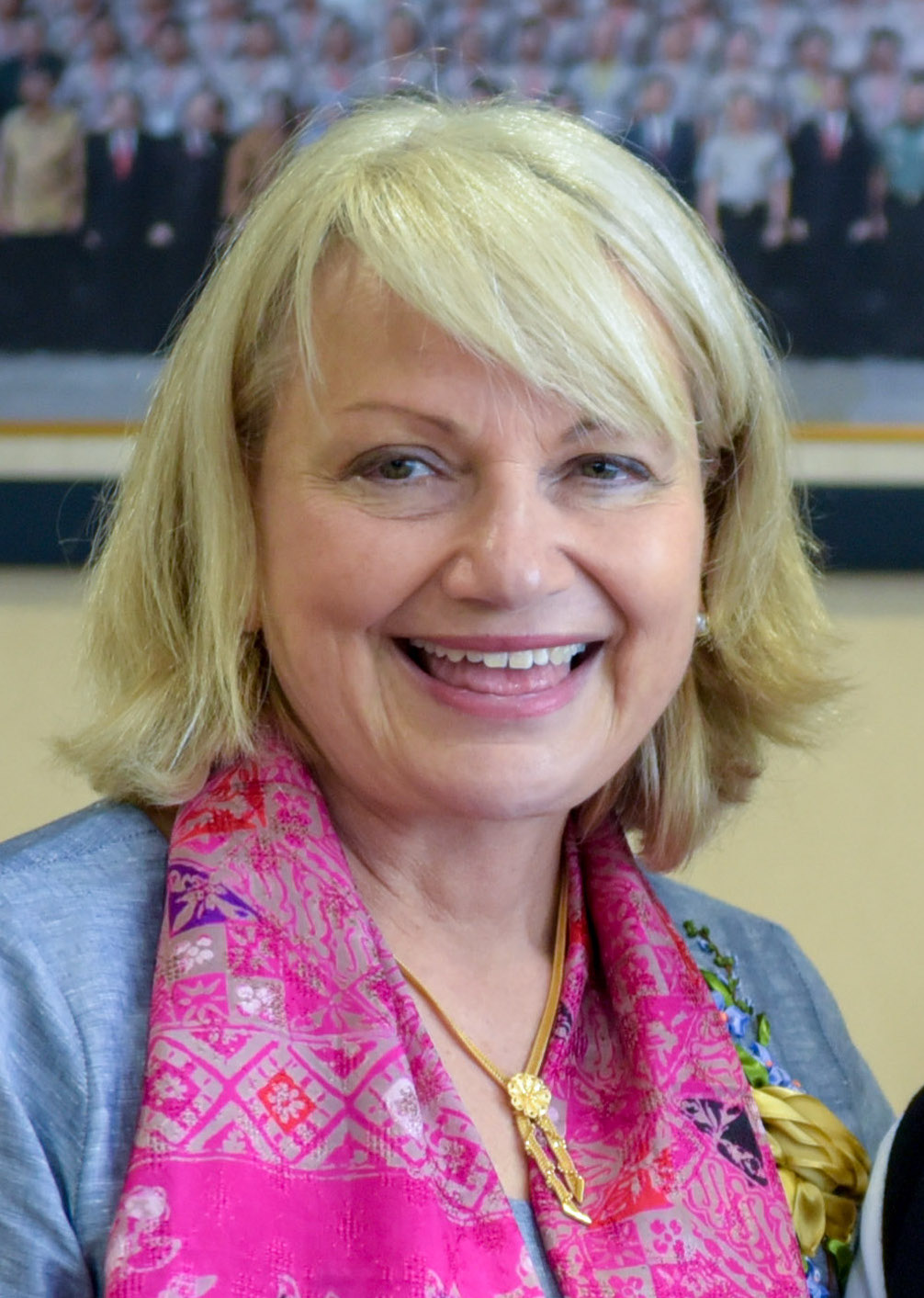
- Stone in 2017

Ambassador of Australia for Women and Girls
- In office 21 November 2016 – 8 March 2020
- Preceded by: Natasha Stott Despoja
- Succeeded by: Julie-Ann Guivarra

Member of the Australian Parliament for Murray
- In office 2 March 1996 – 9 May 2016
- Preceded by: Bruce Lloyd
- Succeeded by: Damian Drum

Minister for Workforce Participation
- In office 27 January 2006 – 3 December 2007
- Prime Minister: John Howard
- Preceded by: Peter Dutton
- Succeeded by: Brendan O'Connor

Personal details
- Born: Sharman Nancy Bawden; 23 April 1951 Pyramid Hill, Victoria, Australia
- Died: 18 November 2026 (aged 75) Shepparton, Victoria, Australia
- Party: Liberal
- Spouse: Doug Stone (divorced)
- Children: 3
- Education: Monash University; La Trobe University
- Occupation: Farmer

Sharman Nancy Stone (née Bawden; 23 April 1951 – 18 November 2026) was an Australian politician who represented Murray in the Australian House of Representatives from 1996 to 2016 as a member of the Liberal Party. She subsequently served as the Australian Ambassador for Women and Girls from when Natasha Stott Despoja stepped down from the role in late 2016 until 2020.

== Background ==
Stone was born in Pyramid Hill, Victoria, the daughter of Harvey Bawden and Nancy Chalmers. She graduated from Monash University with a Bachelor of Arts (Hons), from La Trobe University with a Master of Arts, from Hawthorn College of Advanced Education with a Graduate Diploma of Education and was awarded a PhD by Monash University. She was Manager of International Development at the University of Melbourne, Director of Communications at the Victorian Farmers Federation and a farmer before entering politics.

== Political career ==
Elected to federal parliament at the 1996 federal election, Stone was appointed parliamentary secretary to the Minister for the Environment and Heritage in October 1998. Following the re-election of the Howard government in October 2004, she became parliamentary secretary to the Minister for Finance and Administration. On 27 January 2006 she was appointed Minister for Workforce Participation, succeeding Peter Dutton.

After the defeat of the Howard government in November 2007, Stone took up the role of Shadow Minister for Environment, Heritage, the Arts and Indigenous Affairs. Following Malcolm Turnbull's defeat of Brendan Nelson for the leadership of the Liberal Party, and the retirement of Senator Chris Ellison, Stone became Shadow Minister for Immigration and Citizenship in the subsequent reshuffle. Stone announced her retirement from politics on 26 March 2016, which took effect from the double dissolution of the Australian Parliament on 9 May, in advance of the 2016 federal election on 2 July.

== Author ==
Stone was an author of numerous publications on race relations, environment and geology (with Doug Stone) among others, including Aborigines in White Australia (London and Melbourne, 1974).

Stone was appointed a Member of the Order of Australia in the 2024 Australia Day Honours for "significant service to the people and Parliament of Australia, and to the community through executive positions".

== Death ==
Stone died on 18 November 2026, aged 75. She used voluntary assisted dying after a long battle with glioblastoma.

Parliament of Australia
Preceded by Bruce Lloyd	Member for Murray; 1996–2016	Succeeded by Damian Drum
Political offices
Preceded by Peter Dutton	Minister for Workforce Participation; 2006–2007	Succeeded by Brendan O'Connor
Diplomatic posts
Preceded by Natasha Stott Despoja	Ambassador of Australia for Women and Girls; 2016–2020	Succeeded by Julie-Ann Guivarra
