= 1975 Baltimore mayoral election =

- November 4, 1975
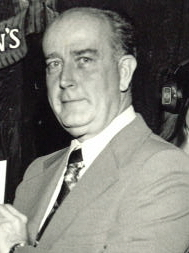

Candidate	William Donald Schaefer	Claudette M. Chandler
Party	Democratic	Republican
Popular vote	91,335	16,036
Percentage	85.07%	14.94%
Mayor before election
William Donald Schaefer
Democratic
Elected mayor
William Donald Schaefer
Democratic

The 1975 Baltimore mayoral election saw the reelection of William Donald Schaefer.

== General election ==
The general election was held November 4.

Baltimore mayoral general election, 1975
Party	Candidate	Votes	%
Democratic	William Donald Schaefer (incumbent)	91,335	85.07%
Republican	Claudette M. Chandler	16,036	14.94%
Total votes		107,371	
Democratic hold			
