= 1972 United States elections =

- ← 1970 1971 1972 1973 1974 → Presidential election year
- Election day: November 7
- Incumbent president: ▌Richard Nixon (R)
- Next Congress: 93rd

Presidential election
- Partisan control: Republican hold
- Popular vote margin: Republican +23.2%
- Electoral vote
- Richard Nixon (R): 520
- George McGovern (D): 17
- 1972 presidential election results. Red denotes states won by Nixon, blue denotes states won by McGovern. Numbers indicate the electoral votes won by each candidate.

Senate elections
- Overall control: Democratic hold
- Seats contested: 34 of 100 seats (33 seats of Class 2 + 2 special elections)
- Net seat change: Democratic +2
- 1972 Senate results Democratic hold Democratic gain Republican hold Republican gain

House elections
- Overall control: Democratic hold
- Seats contested: All 435 voting members
- Popular vote margin: Democratic +5.6%
- Net seat change: Republican +12
- 1972 House of Representatives results Democratic hold Democratic gain Republican hold Republican gain Independent gain

Gubernatorial elections
- Seats contested: 20 (18 states, 2 territories)
- Net seat change: Democratic +1
- 1972 gubernatorial election results Territorial races not shown Democratic hold Democratic gain Republican hold Republican gain

Elections were held on November 7, 1972, and elected the members of the 93rd United States Congress. The election took place during the later stages of the Vietnam War. The Republican Party won a landslide victory in the presidential election, and picked up seats in the House, but the Democratic Party easily retained control of Congress. This was the first election after the ratification of the 26th Amendment granted the right to vote to those aged 18–20.

Incumbent Republican President Richard Nixon won re-election, defeating Democratic Senator George McGovern from South Dakota. Nixon won a landslide victory, taking just under 61% of the popular vote and winning every state but Massachusetts and Washington, D. C. Libertarian John Hospers won the electoral vote of one faithless elector. McGovern won the Democratic nomination, after defeating Washington Senator Henry M. Jackson, Alabama Governor George Wallace, and New York Congresswoman Shirley Chisholm. This was the first presidential election after the McGovern–Fraser Commission (which McGovern himself had chaired) caused an increase in the number of states holding primary elections.

In the House, the Republican Party picked up twelve seats, but Democrats easily retained a majority. In the Senate, the Democratic Party picked up two seats, increasing their majority. The House elections took place after the 1970 United States census and the subsequent congressional re-apportionment.

In the gubernatorial elections, Democrats won a net gain of one seat.

One of the newly elected Senate Democrats was future president Joe Biden who narrowly defeated the incumbent Republican Delaware Senator in an upset victory.

== See also ==
- 1972 United States presidential election
- 1972 United States House of Representatives elections
- 1972 United States Senate elections
- 1972 United States gubernatorial elections
- 1970 United States redistricting cycle
