= 1986 Maryland gubernatorial election =

- November 4, 1986
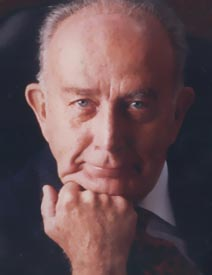

Nominee	William Donald Schaefer	Thomas J. Mooney
Party	Democratic	Republican
Running mate	Melvin Steinberg	Melvin A. Bilal
Popular vote	907,291	194,185
Percentage	82.37%	17.63%
- County results Schaefer: 60–70% 70–80% 80–90% >90%
Governor before election
Harry Hughes
Democratic
Elected Governor
William Donald Schaefer
Democratic

The 1986 Maryland gubernatorial election was held on November 4, 1986. Democratic nominee William Donald Schaefer defeated Republican nominee Thomas J. Mooney with 82.37% of the vote. To date this is the largest percentage total ever for a contested statewide election in Maryland.

As of November, 2026, this is the last time a candidate from either party carried every county in a gubernatorial election, and the last time the Democratic candidate won a majority of counties in a gubernatorial election. He is also the last Democrat to win the following counties: Garrett, Washington, Carroll, Queen Anne's, Caroline, Dorchester, Wicomico, and Somerset. Anne Arundel County, Frederick County, Kent County, and Talbot County would not vote Democratic again until 2022.

== Primary elections ==
Primary elections were held on September 9, 1986.

=== Democratic primary ===
==== Candidates ====
- William Donald Schaefer, Mayor of Baltimore
- Stephen H. Sachs, Attorney General of Maryland
- Lawrence K. Freeman, Lyndon LaRouche activist and perennial candidate
- Mary Fellenbaum Holter

==== Results ====
Democratic primary results
Party	Candidate	Votes	%
Democratic	William Donald Schaefer	395,170	61.75
Democratic	Stephen H. Sachs	224,755	35.12
Democratic	Lawrence K. Freeman	14,120	2.21
Democratic	Mary Fellenbaum Holter	5,919	0.93
Total votes		639,964	100.00

== General election ==
=== Candidates ===
- William Donald Schaefer, Democratic
- Thomas J. Mooney, Fmr State Delegate, Republican

=== Results ===
1986 Maryland gubernatorial election
Party	Candidate	Votes	%	±%
Democratic	William Donald Schaefer	907,291	82.37%	+20.40%
Republican	Thomas J. Mooney	194,185	17.63%	−20.37%
Majority		713,106	64.74%	+40.77%
Turnout		1,101,476		
Democratic hold		Swing		
