= 1979 Baltimore mayoral election =

- November 6, 1979
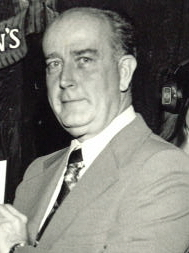

Candidate	William Donald Schaefer	Samuel A. Culotta
Party	Democratic	Republican
Popular vote	118,706	25,072
Percentage	82.56%	17.44%
Mayor before election
William Donald Schaefer
Democratic
Elected mayor
William Donald Schaefer
Democratic

The 1979 Baltimore mayoral election saw the reelection of William Donald Schaefer to a third consecutive term.

== Nominations ==
Primary elections were held September 11.

=== Democratic primary ===
Democratic primary results
Party	Candidate	Votes	%
Democratic	William Donald Schaefer (incumbent)	70,035	68.81%
Democratic	Patrick L. McDonough	14,241	13.99%
Democratic	Clarence Davis	10,999	10.81%
Democratic	William Edward Roberts, Sr.	3,661	3.60%
Democratic	E. Zatella S. Giles	2,848	2.80%
Total votes		101,784	

=== Republican primary ===
Republican primary results
Party	Candidate	Votes	%
Republican	Samuel A. Culotta	3,932	68.96%
Republican	Eugene E. Dailey	725	12.72%
Republican	Melvin C. Perkins	551	9.66%
Republican	Louis R. Milio	494	8.66%
Total votes		5,702	

== General election ==
The general election was held November 6.

Baltimore mayoral general election, 1979
Party	Candidate	Votes	%
Democratic	William Donald Schaefer (incumbent)	118,706	82.56%
Republican	Samuel A. Culotta	25,072	17.44%
Total votes		143,778	
Democratic hold			
