= 1971 Baltimore mayoral election =

Election

- November 9, 1971
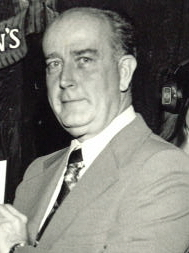

Candidate	William Donald Schaefer	Ross Zimmerman Pierpont
Party	Democratic	Republican
Popular vote	120,726	17,680
Percentage	87.23%	12.77%
Mayor before election
Thomas D'Alesandro III
Democratic
Elected mayor
William Donald Schaefer
Democratic

The 1971 Baltimore mayoral election saw the election of William Donald Schaefer.

== Nominations ==
Primary elections were held September 14.

=== Democratic primary ===
Democratic primary results
Party	Candidate	Votes	%
Democratic	William Donald Schaefer	95,315	56.23%
Democratic	George L. Russell, Jr.	58,528	34.53%
Democratic	Francis J. Valle	7,202	4.25%
Democratic	Clarence M. Mitchell, II	6,354	3.75%
Democratic	Joseph M. Heinle	1,185	0.70%
Democratic	William Edward Roberts, Sr.	938	0.55%
Total votes		169,522	

=== Republican primary ===
Republican primary results
Party	Candidate	Votes	%
Republican	Ross Zimmerman Pierpont	5,474	43.96%
Republican	Monroe Cornish	4,126	33.14%
Republican	Samuel D. Shapiro	1,695	13.61%
Republican	Louis R. Milio	1,157	9.29%
Total votes		12,452	

== General election ==
The general election was held November 6.

Baltimore mayoral general election, 1971
Party	Candidate	Votes	%
Democratic	William Donald Schaefer	120,726	87.23%
Republican	Ross Zimmerman Pierpont	17,680	12.77%
Total votes		138,406	
Democratic hold			
