= 1971 Kew state by-election =

- 17 April 1971

Electoral district of Kew in the Victorian Legislative Assembly
- Turnout: 82.8% (▼10.2)
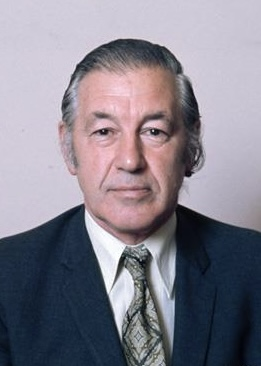

	First party	Second party
Candidate	Rupert Hamer	Rosslyn Ives
Party	Liberal	Labor
Primary vote	13,422	6,325
Percentage	64.8%	30.5%
Swing	▲23.1	▲4.7
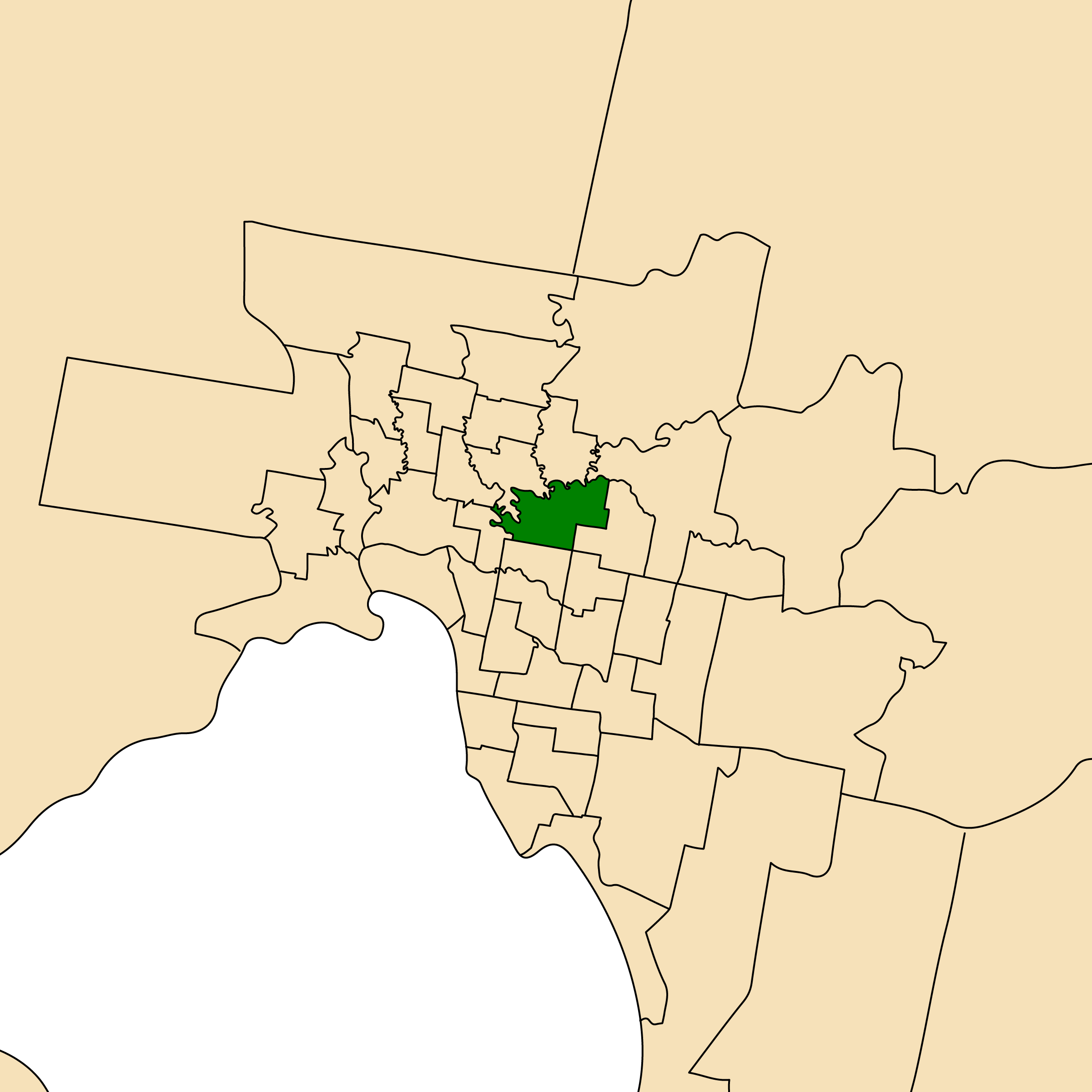
- Location of the electoral district of Kew in Melbourne
MP before election
Arthur Rylah
Liberal
Elected MP
Rupert Hamer
Liberal

A by-election for the seat of Kew was held on 17 April 1971 following the resignation of then Deputy Premier, Arthur Rylah. The by-election was won by Liberal candidate, Rupert Hamer, he won with a 64.8% primary vote and a swing of 23.1% in his primary vote.

== Background ==
Since it was first created in 1927, the electoral district of Kew has typically been a safe seat for the Liberal Party.

The by-election was called after the sitting member and Deputy Premier at the time, Arthur Rylah, resigned from parliament. Rylah's resignation followed a failed attempt from members of the local East Kew branch to challenge his preselection. A month after Rylah's resignation announcement, he has collapsed at his desk and spent the following four months in hospital.

== Candidates ==
A total of 3 candidates ran in the by-election.

Party	Candidate	Background
Liberal	Rupert Hamer	Member of the Legislative Council for East Yarra Province
Labor	Rosslyn Ives	
Independent	L. R. Hull	

== Results ==
1971 Kew state by-election
Party	Candidate	Votes	%	±%
Liberal	Rupert Hamer	13,422	64.8	+23.1
Labor	Rosslyn Ives	6,325	30.5	+4.7
Independent	L R Hull	968	4.7	+4.7
Total formal votes		20,715	97.7	+0.5
Informal votes		497	2.3	−0.5
Turnout		21,212	82.8	−10.2
Liberal hold		Swing	None	

- Preferences were not distributed as Hamer won with an absolute majority of votes (50% of votes).

== See also ==
- List of Victorian state by-elections
