= Division of Murray =

Former Australian federal electoral division

Coordinates: 36.279°S 144.646°E

Murray Australian House of Representatives Division
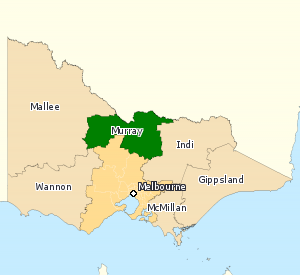
- Division of Murray in Victoria, as of the 2016 federal election
- Created: 1949
- Abolished: 2019
- Namesake: Murray River
- Electors: 104,359 (2016)
- Area: 16,229 km^{2} (6,266.1 sq mi)
- Demographic: Rural

The Division of Murray was an Australian Electoral Division in the state of Victoria. It was located in the north of the state, adjoining the Murray River, which forms Victoria's border with New South Wales. It included the towns of Shepparton, Echuca, Cobram, Yarrawonga, Boort and Bridgewater. In 2018 the division was renamed the Division of Nicholls, coming into effect at the 2019 federal election.

== Boundaries ==
Since 1984, federal electoral division boundaries in Australia have been determined at redistributions by a redistribution committee appointed by the Australian Electoral Commission. Redistributions occur for the boundaries of divisions in a particular state, and they occur every seven years, or sooner if a state's representation entitlement changes or when divisions of a state are malapportioned.

When the division was created in 1949, it replaced parts of the Division of Indi around the Shepparton area and parts of the Division of Bendigo around the Echuca and Rochester areas. However, Indi and Bendigo only began to cover those areas 12 years earlier in 1937, when the Division of Echuca was abolished. The new division of Murray shared similar areas and boundaries with much of the division of Echuca prior to the latter's abolition.

== History ==
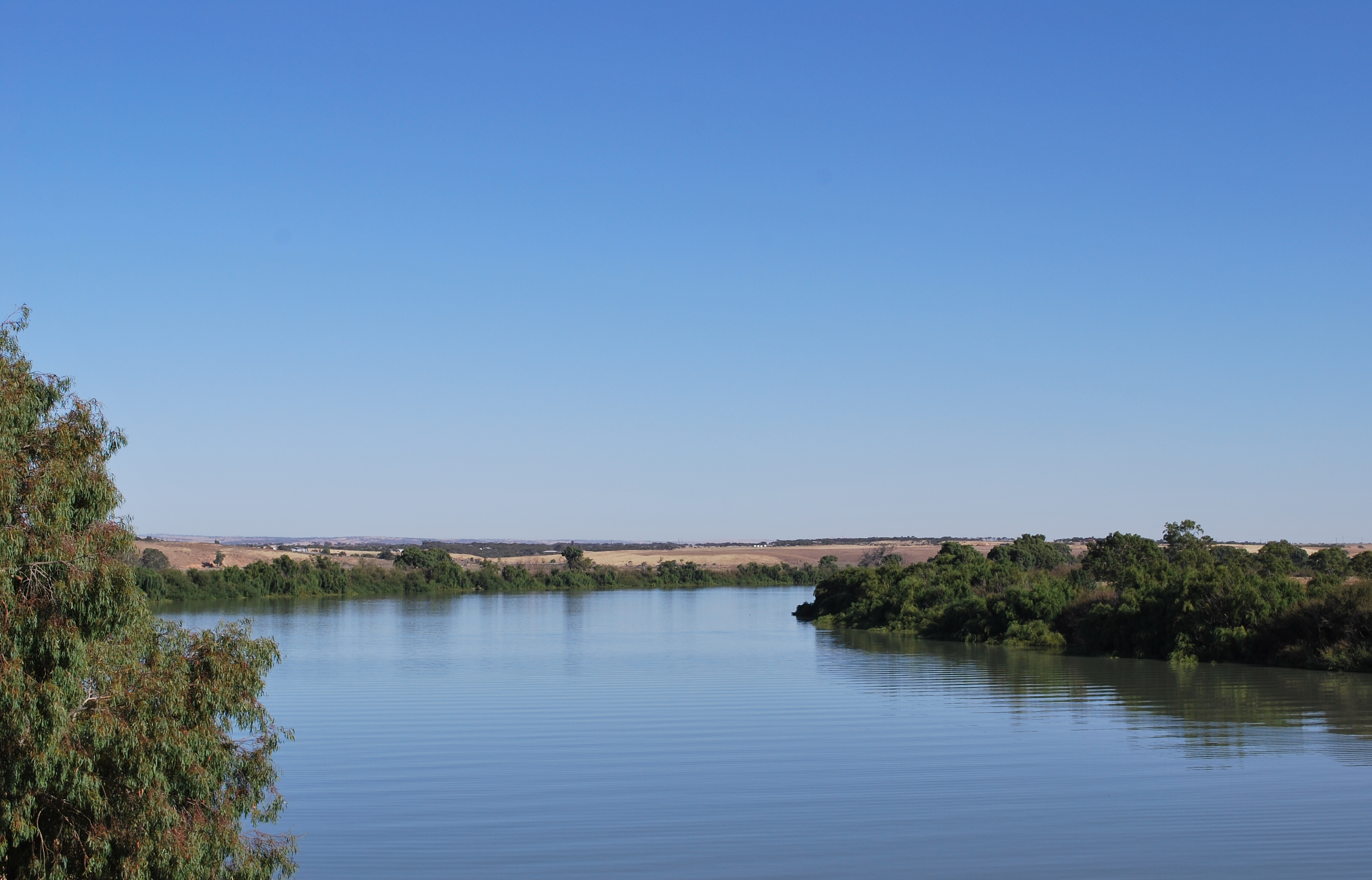
The Murray River, the division's namesake

The Division was proclaimed at the redistribution of 11 May 1949, and was first contested at the 1949 election. It was named after the Murray River, which itself was named after British Secretary of State for War and the Colonies Sir George Murray. It was first held by John McEwen, who was the last member for Echuca until 1937, and member for Indi between 1937 and 1949. Both Echuca and Indi had covered similar areas to the Division of Murray during those times.

McEwen served as Prime Minister after the disappearance of Harold Holt, and subsequently became the inaugural Deputy Prime Minister under John Gorton. His successor in the seat, Bruce Lloyd, went on to serve as deputy leader to three successive Nationals leaders - Ian Sinclair, Charles Blunt and Tim Fischer.

Murray was in the hands of either the Liberal or National parties for its entire existence. At the time of its abolition, it was the third-safest coalition-held seat in Australia, with a 20-point swing required for Labor to win it.

In 2018 the division was renamed the Division of Nicholls, coming into effect at the 2019 federal election.

== Members ==
Image	Member	Party	Term	Notes
	John McEwen (1900–1980)	Country	10 December 1949 – 1 February 1971	Previously held the Division of Indi. Served as minister under Menzies, Holt and Gorton. Served as Prime Minister from 1967 to 1968. Served as Deputy Prime Minister under Gorton. Resigned to retire from politics
	Bruce Lloyd (1937–)	Country	20 March 1971 – 2 May 1975	Retired
	Bruce Lloyd (1937–)	National Country	2 May 1975 – 16 October 1982	Retired
	Bruce Lloyd (1937–)	Nationals	16 October 1982 – 29 January 1996	Retired
	Sharman Stone (1951–2026)	Liberal	2 March 1996 – 9 May 2016	Served as minister under Howard. Retired
	Damian Drum (1960–)	Nationals	2 July 2016 – 11 April 2019	Previously a member of the Victorian Legislative Council. Transferred to the Division of Nicholls after Murray was abolished in 2019

== Election results ==
2016 Australian federal election: Murray
Party	Candidate	Votes	%	±%
National	Damian Drum	31,105	35.34	+35.34
Liberal	Duncan McGauchie	28,194	32.03	−29.38
Labor	Alan Williams	13,188	14.98	−5.76
Greens	Ian Christoe	3,880	4.41	+0.48
Country	Robert Danieli	3,556	4.04	+4.04
Independent	Fern Summer	3,323	3.78	+3.78
Independent	Andrew Bock	1,467	1.67	+1.67
Rise Up Australia	Yasmin Gunasekera	1,195	1.36	+0.73
Independent	Diane Teasdale	1,037	1.18	+1.18
Independent	Nigel Hicks	844	0.96	+0.96
Citizens Electoral Council	Jeff Davy	227	0.26	−0.10
Total formal votes		88,016	91.16	−2.51
Informal votes		8,530	8.84	+2.51
Turnout		96,546	92.51	−2.04
Two-candidate-preferred result
National	Damian Drum	48,527	55.13	+55.13
Liberal	Duncan McGauchie	39,489	44.87	−26.00
National gain from Liberal		Swing	N/A	
