= William Donald Schaefer =

American politician (1921–2011)

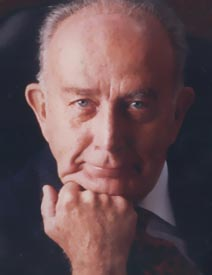
- Schaefer in 1990

58th Governor of Maryland
- In office January 21, 1987 – January 18, 1995
- Lieutenant: Melvin Steinberg
- Preceded by: Harry Hughes
- Succeeded by: Parris Glendening

32nd Comptroller of Maryland
- In office January 25, 1999 – January 22, 2007
- Governor: Parris Glendening; Bob Ehrlich; Martin O'Malley
- Preceded by: Robert L. Swann
- Succeeded by: Peter Franchot

45th Mayor of Baltimore
- In office December 1971 – January 26, 1987
- Preceded by: Thomas D'Alesandro
- Succeeded by: Clarence H. Burns

Personal details
- Born: November 2, 1921 Baltimore, Maryland, U.S.
- Died: April 18, 2011 (aged 89) Catonsville, Maryland, U.S.
- Party: Democratic
- Education: University of Baltimore

Military service
- Allegiance: United States
- Branch/service: United States Army (1942–1946); United States Army Reserves (1946–1979)
- Years of service: 1942–1979
- Rank: Colonel
- Battles/wars: World War II

William Donald Schaefer (November 2, 1921 – April 18, 2011) was an American politician who served in public office for 50 years at both the state and local level in Maryland. As a Democrat, he was the 45th mayor of Baltimore from December 1971 to January 1987, the 58th governor of Maryland from January 21, 1987, to January 18, 1995, and the 32nd comptroller of Maryland from January 20, 1999, to January 17, 2007. On September 12, 2006, he was defeated in his reelection bid for a third term as Comptroller by Maryland Delegate Peter Franchot in the Democratic Party primary.

== Early life and career ==
Schaefer was born in Baltimore, Maryland, the only child of Tululu Irene (née Skipper) and William Henry Schaefer, on November 2, 1921. His parents were Baptist, and he was of part German ancestry. He spent his childhood at 620 Edgewood Street in the old West Baltimore community off Edmondson Avenue, near Hilton Street and Parkway by Gwynns Falls-Leakin Park. He received early education in Baltimore's city public schools, and later graduated from The Baltimore City College (a public high school) in its centennial class of 1939. Schaefer received an LL.B. from the University of Baltimore School of Law in 1942 and an LL.M. in 1954.

Schaefer was a member of the Order of DeMolay in Baltimore as a youth, later inducted into the DeMolay International Hall of Fame. He was also a Freemason and a member of the "Grand Lodge of Ancient Free and Accepted Masons of the State of Maryland". He was a member of "Mystic Circle Lodge No. 109" when he first ran for public office. During his childhood and much of his adulthood, Schaefer was a member of Cummins Memorial Church in the Reformed Episcopal Church, serving as a vestryman and treasurer.

When the United States entered World War II on Monday, December 8, 1941, Schaefer joined the United States Army and later achieved officer rank, taking charge of administering hospitals in England and the rest of western Europe. He continued to remain in the U.S. Army Reserves during his academic, legal and political/public service careers until 1979, when he retired with the rank of colonel.

Schaefer resumed his legal career afterwards, practicing real estate law. He had earned his Master of Law degree in 1954 from the University of Baltimore School of Law and formed a general practice law firm with two colleagues. Except for his military service, he lived unmarried with his mother in two different very plain West Baltimore two-story, six-room "daylight-style" rowhouses on Edgewood Street (off Edmondson Avenue) all his life, until moving to the Government House (Maryland Governor's Mansion) at age 65 in 1987.

Impelled, according to his biographer, by a situation in which Cummins Memorial Church lost a city property auction in which it was the highest bidder due to alleged corruption, Schaefer ran for a seat in the Maryland House of Delegates (lower chamber of the General Assembly of Maryland) in 1950 and again in 1954, losing both elections. He was successful in his third campaign for a seat on the Baltimore City Council in 1955, when his concern for city planning and housing issues propelled him to a seat representing the 5th Councilmanic District. In 1967, Schaefer ran successfully for Baltimore City Council president and, four years later in 1971, he ran successfully for the mayor's office, when incumbent mayor Thomas L. J. D'Alesandro III, brother of Nancy Pelosi, retired after one term.

== Mayor of Baltimore (1971–1987) ==
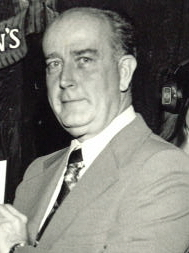
Schaefer in 1975

Schaefer served four terms as mayor, being first elected in 1971, then re-elected in 1975, 1979 and 1983, each time receiving 85% or more of the vote. He was known for his attention to detail: taking notes of strewn garbage and citing other violations as he rode around for appointments/events in a plain town car with a police officer driver, and ordering them fixed immediately. A famous photograph shows him dressed in a Victorian style red and orange-striped bathing suit, with a straw boater hat, carrying an inflatable rubber duck into the outside seal pool at the then under construction National Aquarium in Baltimore at the Inner Harbor, attracting wide national media attention, to settle a wager that it would not be opened in time in August 1981. In 1984, in a move to give the majority African-American population more power in the city of Baltimore, Schaefer named Bishop L. Robinson as the Baltimore City Police Department's first African-American police commissioner, a position previously dominated by Irish American and Italian American members of the city police department. Baltimore's 1967 police headquarters were renamed for Robinson in 2007.

Throughout his tenure as mayor, Schaefer realized that the closings of large manufacturing plants like Bethlehem Steel at Sparrows Point (since 1887 in southeastern suburban, but blue-collar Baltimore County, near Dundalk), the largest waterfront steel mill in the world; and the 70-year-old General Motors auto/truck assembly plant on Broening Highway in the southeast city would negatively impact the quality of life in the city of Baltimore and add to the city's unemployment rate. His administration turned to tourism as a possible alternative. He pushed for and saw built a new Baltimore Convention Center along West Pratt Street between South Charles, Sharp and Howard Streets in downtown Baltimore in 1979, enlarged again in the 1990s to keep up with expanding and larger competition for the burgeoning nationwide convention business; as well as the opening of Baltimore's famed "Harborplace", festival marketplace pavilions by shopping center developer and urban visionary James Rouse along the north and west shores of the old "Basin" (Inner Harbor) at East Pratt Street along South Calvert Street, replacing the former small grassy central "Pratt and Light" triangular Samuel Smith Park with its bronze statue of the old brave "Defender of Baltimore" (from the British attack at the Battle of Baltimore crafted at the 1914 Star Spangled Banner Centennial from the War of 1812) and its surrounding "temporary" Light Street parking lots from the last waterfront "urban renewal" project of the Mayor Thomas J. D'Alesandro, Jr. (1903–1987, served 1947–1959) administration from the late 1940s. Dubbed "America's Best Mayor" at the time by several national magazine stories, Mayor Schaefer was hailed for transforming a deteriorating city into a hub of national tourism, although the groundwork and the original vision for the Inner Harbor project in the early 1960s to succeed the previous Charles Center downtown renewal of 1958–1970 had first been foreseen and crafted two mayoral administrations earlier under progressive/liberal Republican mayor and former governor of Maryland Theodore R. McKeldin (1900–1974, served 1943–1947 and 1963–1967), who was eventually recognized by having the redeveloped plaza facing the new "festival marketplaces" at Pratt, Light and Calvert Streets renamed for him. With new businesses, new hotels, a new National Aquarium and the new convention center, Baltimore had been revived. Harborplace had 18 million visitors its first year, 1980–81. In 1984, Esquire magazine named Schaefer "the best mayor in America". A 1993 survey of historians, political scientists and urban experts conducted by Melvin G. Holli of the University of Illinois at Chicago ranked Schaefer as the twentieth-best American big-city mayor to have served between the years 1820 and 1993.

=== Colts leave ===
Schaefer constantly battled Robert Irsay, the owner of the Baltimore Colts of the National Football League. Irsay and Orioles owner Jerrold Hoffberger complained that Memorial Stadium, which the Colts and the American League's Baltimore Orioles shared, was antiquated due to a lack of quality seats and inadequate parking. Schaefer extracted a promise from Irsay that the Colts owner would call Schaefer first before moving the team. However, after one of the houses of the Maryland State Legislature passed legislation giving the city of Baltimore the right to seize ownership of the team by eminent domain – an idea first floated in a memo written by Baltimore mayoral aide Mark Wasserman – Robert Irsay called Indianapolis Mayor William Hudnut that afternoon and began serious negotiations in order to move the team before the Maryland legislature's other chamber could pass similar legislation. In the early morning hours of March 29, 1984, Mayflower moving vans began relocating the Colts from the team's Owings Mills training facility to Indianapolis. Schaefer lamented that "[Irsay] didn't call his old friend, Don" before the move.

=== Ravens arrive ===
The Colts were not the first professional sports team to leave Baltimore on Schaefer's watch. In 1973, the Baltimore Bullets moved to Landover, Maryland and were renamed the Capital Bullets, and later, the Washington Bullets. In his last years as mayor, and later during his two terms as governor, Schaefer led the push to build Oriole Park at Camden Yards for the Orioles and M&T Bank Stadium for a new NFL team, which came to fruition in 1996 when Art Modell moved the Cleveland Browns to Baltimore, giving credit to Schaefer for the transaction:

He's the reason the Ravens are here, he laid the foundation first as Baltimore's mayor and as governor of Maryland when he championed the funding of a new stadium. In fact, champion is the right word. Gov. Schaefer was a champion for Baltimore, for Maryland and for the common man.

== Governor of Maryland (1987–1995) ==
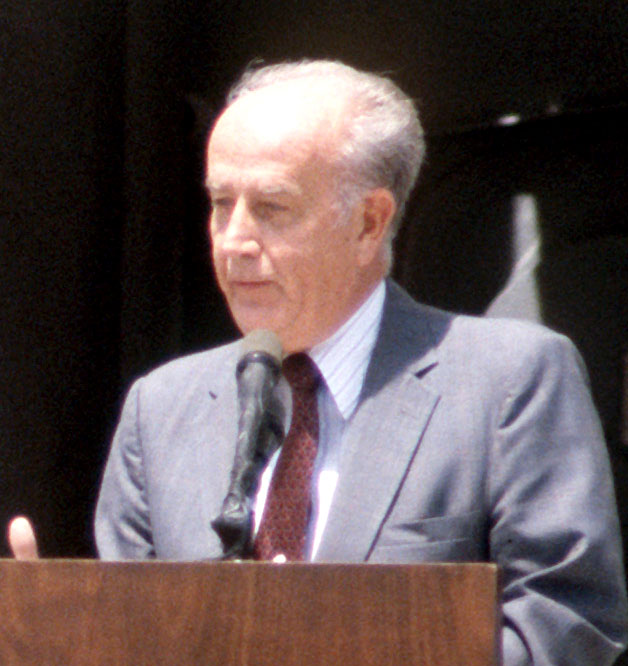
Schaefer speaking at USS Antietam commissioning for the United States Navy, 1987

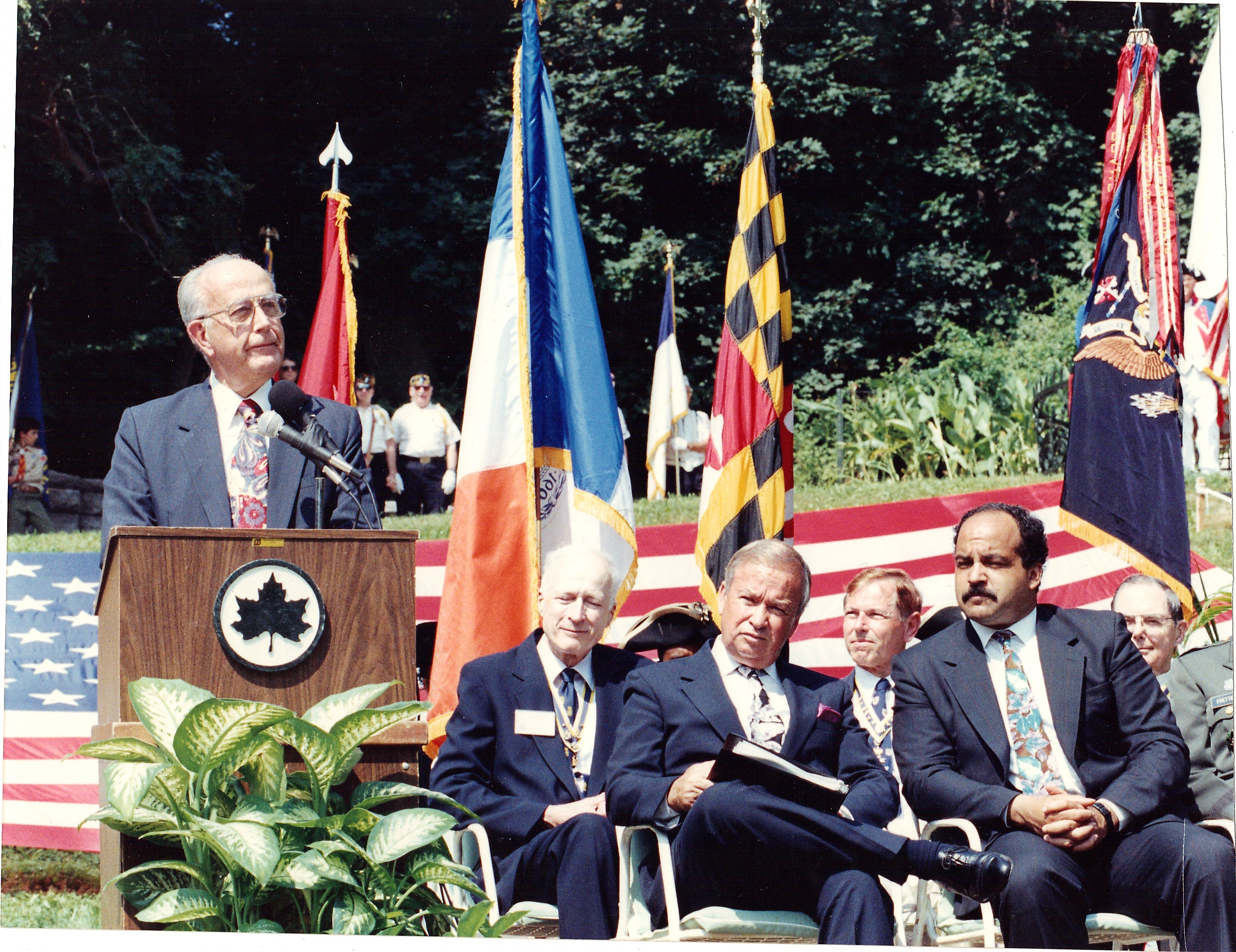
Schaefer at the unveiling of a Monument dedicated to the "Maryland 400", Prospect Park, August 27, 1991.

Schaefer, with running mate Melvin Steinberg, was overwhelmingly elected the 58th governor of Maryland in 1986, defeating Republican challenger Thomas J. Mooney with 82% of the vote, the largest percentage total ever for a contested statewide election in Maryland. He was re-elected in 1990 with almost 60% of the vote. Immediately upon taking office, Schaefer sought to take on the state's unemployment problem. After learning of a proposed closing of a major corporation in western Maryland, he personally went to Allegany County with his top advisors and the Maryland Congressional delegation and devised a plan of state and federal action to meet the needs of the faltering company. The corporation kept its headquarters in Allegany County, saving 600 jobs. Schaefer's legacy includes the construction of Oriole Park at Camden Yards, stricter measures taken toward preventing and solving the Chesapeake Bay pollution problem, and higher standards for public schools.

Schaefer reappointed Philip Kapneck as Maryland Trade Ambassador, originally appointed by Governor Mandel. Kapneck worked closely with the pro-business governor, bringing overseas companies to Maryland, creating many new jobs and generating revenue for the state.

Schaefer as governor also pushed for the light rail line of electric trains that run 30 miles from Hunt Valley in Baltimore County, through Baltimore, past Oriole Park at Camden Yards, to Cromwell Station/Glen Burnie in Anne Arundel County, near BWI Airport.

Detractors remind the public that, in the winter of 1991, Gov. Schaefer compared Maryland's Eastern Shore to an outhouse (he referred to the region as a "shithouse"). When the remark circulated, Eastern Shore residents erupted in protest.

In the 1992 presidential election, Governor Schaefer endorsed Republican President George H. W. Bush over Democratic challenger Bill Clinton. "He was a great man. I liked him; he was a friend. I went up to Camp David with him.". He also endorsed Republican Congresswoman Helen Delich Bentley in her bid to succeed him as governor in 1994.

Schaefer stepped down from his position as governor on January 18, 1995, after serving the maximum two consecutive four-year terms.

== Post-gubernatorial activities ==
Following his career as governor, Schaefer became Of Counsel to the law firm of Gordon, Feinblatt, Rothman, Hoffberger & Hollander, LLC, in Baltimore until 1999. The William Donald Schaefer Chair was established at University of Maryland, College Park's School of Public Affairs in 1995. Schaefer held the position until 1999, at which time the program was expanded to include funded internships.

Schaefer had a long-time companion in Hilda Mae Snoops, who was his "official hostess" in the Governor's mansion. She commissioned a controversial Victorian-style outdoor fountain and helped design a rose garden and walkways. The fountain is included in her First Lady-style portrait. After Snoops' death in 1999, the fountain became a source of controversy as Schaefer accused his successor, Parris Glendening, of using it to get political revenge by turning it off, supposedly to save water even though it recycles existing water. Upon becoming governor, Robert Ehrlich held a ceremony to turn the water flow back on in the fountain. Snoops is interred in the mausoleum at Dulaney Valley Memorial Gardens, adjacent to Schaefer.

== Comptroller of Maryland (1999–2007) ==
In 1998, three years after leaving the governorship, with the sudden death of longtime Comptroller Louis L. Goldstein, Schaefer ran in the special election for the position of Comptroller of Maryland against Republican Mark Epstein. He won by a substantial margin, 62% to 38%. Schaefer came into the office on January 25, 1999. In 2002, he had remained extremely popular in Maryland and received almost 68% of the vote in the general election.

Schaefer feuded frequently with Governor Parris Glendening at the bimonthly Board of Public Works (BPW) meetings. Schaefer once called Glendening a "despot" and often chided him. Schaefer frequently referred to Glendening as "Ayatollah." Glendening endorsed and paid for advertisements on behalf of Schaefer's 2002 Democratic primary opponent, Secretary of State John T. Willis, but Schaefer defeated him easily. Glendening's degree of unpopularity was such that it was reported his support for Willis might cost Willis votes. Schaefer enjoyed considerably warmer relations with Governor Robert Ehrlich, the Republican who succeeded Glendening on January 15, 2003.

=== Controversies ===
As Comptroller, Schaefer regularly spoke critically of immigrants who cannot communicate in English. He was particularly well known for his May 2004 comment about a non-English-speaking McDonald's cashier.

Schaefer also stirred up controversy on October 12, 2004, when he called people with AIDS "a danger". He said that those with the disease "brought it on themselves." From the 1990s, he had repeatedly called for a public registry listing HIV-positive Maryland residents. "As far as I'm concerned, people who have AIDS are a danger", Schaefer said. "People should be able to know who has AIDS."

On February 15, 2006, Schaefer made suggestive comments to Elizabeth Krum, a 24-year-old assistant to then-Governor Robert Ehrlich. Responding to Schaefer's request for tea, Krum set a thermal mug in front of him. Schaefer watched her walk away, then beckoned for her to return. When she obliged, he told her, "Walk again", staring after her as she left the conference room. Schaefer initially refused to apologize, saying, "She's a pretty little girl. She ought to be damn happy that I observed her going out the door. The day I don't look at pretty women is the day I die." (Schaefer long called the women with whom he worked "little girls.") However, within days of the leering incident, Schaefer issued a handwritten letter to Krum informing her she had handled the affair as a "trouper."

On July 5, 2006, Schaefer launched into a rambling commentary on immigration as the public works board considered a contract to provide testing services for the English as a Second Language (ESOL) program in Maryland schools. As state education officials tried to explain the contract, Schaefer demanded to know whether the program would benefit Korean students. "Korea's another one, all of a sudden they're our friends, too, shooting missiles at us", he said. Schaefer was apparently referring to North Korea's test launch earlier that week of a long-range missile, which fell into the ocean. Schaefer refused to apologize for his comments after a meeting with South Korean community leaders. Later that same day, when he was questioned by a female Baltimore Sun reporter about the ESOL program, Schaefer's response was to call her a "sweet little girl."

=== 2006 re-election campaign ===
Schaefer faced a competitive primary challenge for Comptroller in 2006. He was challenged by Anne Arundel County Executive Janet S. Owens and Delegate Peter Franchot (District 20). The campaign initially looked like a struggle between Schaefer and Franchot. After deciding against running for the U.S. House seat being vacated by Benjamin Cardin (so that Cardin could run for the U.S. Senate), Owens decided to jump into the race for Comptroller.

In early July 2006, when asked if he would debate Owens, he said he "wouldn't debate her on how to bake a chocolate cake." Franchot campaigned strongly as the "only real Democrat in the race." On September 5, 2006, Schaefer told Washington Post columnist Marc Fisher that Janet Owens is a "prissy little miss" who wears "long dresses, looks like Mother Hubbard – it's sort of like she was a man." He made additional comments that she was "getting fat." Later, in an on-air interview with reporter Tyler Evans of local news station News Channel 8, he further commented: "She's got these long clothes on and an old-fashioned hairdo. You know it sort of makes you real mad." On September 8, 2006, another local news station, WUSA9, showed an off-screen reporter asking him, "Did you call her an Old Mother Hubbard?" to which he responded, "Well, what does she look like? ... Old-fashioned hairdo; long dress ... If I lose or win – whatever I do – I'm gonna send her some Style magazines." His campaign called a press conference, but he failed to show. Owens commented that perhaps Schaefer had become too old to run, saying that running against him was like a granddaughter "taking the keys away from grandpa." In response, Schaefer and his campaign hinted that Owens was lashing out at him in an act of age discrimination. One viewer wrote in, suggesting that perhaps Schaefer was showing signs of dementia. The anchor responded that the caller had pointed out "the elephant in the room" that, until then, the media was hesitant to suggest. Schaefer refused to apologize for his comments regarding Owens' appearance, saying, "An apology? An apology for what? I can't help it how she looks." Asked about his heated exchanges with Owens, Schaefer said, "This was started not by me." He added, "There's dirty politics, and then there's filthy politics."

On September 12, during the Democratic primary election, Schaefer was pushed into third place behind Franchot and Owens, with Franchot winning the primary by 15,000 votes over Owens. The tight three-way race saw Franchot winning the Washington, D.C., suburbs (Montgomery County and Prince George's County), Owens winning in Central Maryland (Howard County and Anne Arundel County), and Schaefer holding his own in the Baltimore metro area (Baltimore City and Baltimore County). This was Schaefer's first campaign loss since 1954.

Schaefer's last day at work as Comptroller was January 19, 2007. He was succeeded on January 22 by Franchot, who won the general election, and was not present for Franchot's swearing in. After retiring, he moved into the Charlestown Retirement Community in Catonsville, Maryland. His health declined quickly and he made few public appearances in his final years.

== Death ==
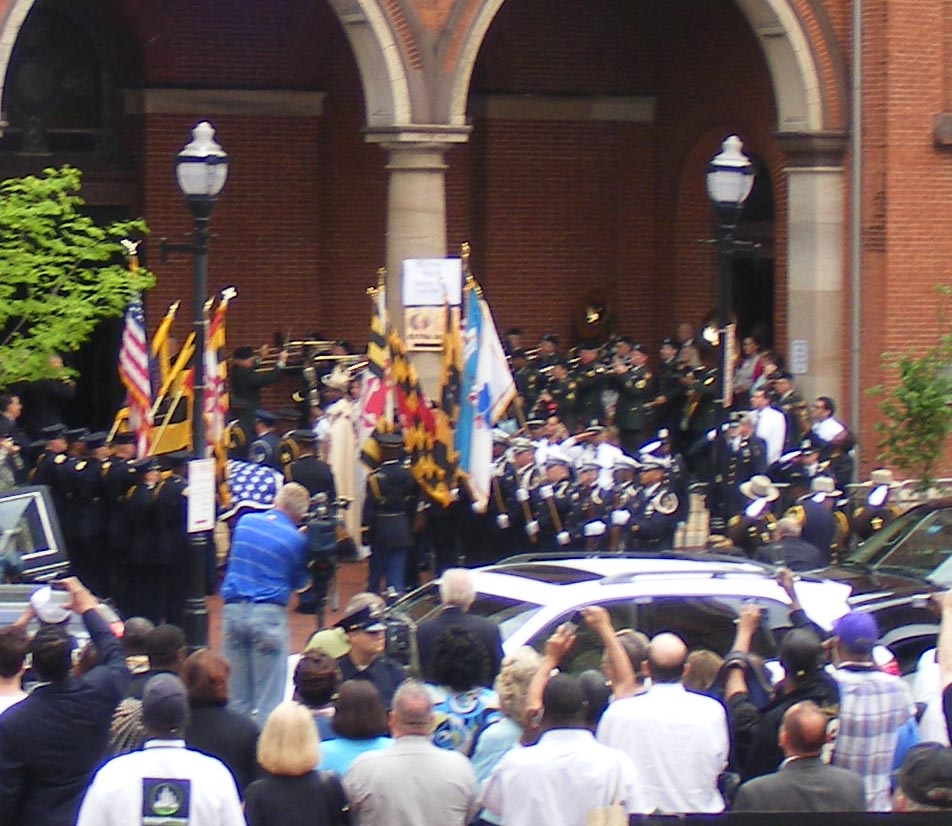
The flag-draped casket of William Donald Schaefer being carried into historic Old Saint Paul's Episcopal Church, at North Charles and East Saratoga Streets, April 27, 2011

Schaefer died at the age of 89 on April 18, 2011, at his latest home in Catonsville. He had recently been hospitalized due to pneumonia at St. Agnes Hospital in southwest Baltimore and was receiving hospice care at the time of his death. During his governorship, Schaefer had switched his membership from his longtime church, Cummins Memorial, to Old St. Paul's Episcopal Church, the oldest church in Baltimore, founded 1692. His funeral took place at Old St. Paul's, and Schaefer was buried at Dulaney Valley Memorial Gardens near Towson in suburban Baltimore County.

== Legacy ==
In 1978, Schaefer received the U.S. Senator John Heinz Award for Greatest Public Service by an Elected or Appointed Official, an award given out annually by Jefferson Awards.

The William Donald Schaefer Center for Public Policy was established in 1985. Currently the center is located at the University of Baltimore School of Public Affairs.

In 2008, Schaefer moved the "Civic Fund", which he had established and used while Mayor of Baltimore to make small grants to neighborhoods for projects such as erecting flagpoles or cultivating community gardens, to the Baltimore Community Foundation, adding to it his leftover campaign funds and proceeds from the sale of his house. After its settlement, $1.4 million from the late governor's estate was added in 2012 to this fund. The William Donald Schaefer Civic Fund is a permanent endowment which continues to provide small grants for neighborhood projects. Two years before his death, a statue of Schaefer was unveiled in Baltimore's Inner Harbor as a gift by construction magnate Willard Hackerman.

In July 2022, a theatrical production titled Do It Now! about Schaefer's time as mayor was produced at Fells Point Corner Theatre in Baltimore.

Several buildings have been dedicated in Schaefer's honor:

- William Donald Schaefer Building, state office building at the northwest corner of St. Paul and East Baltimore Streets (former bankrupt Merritt Savings & Loan Association building) in downtown Baltimore, Maryland.
- William Donald Schaefer Engineering Building at Morgan State University on Hillen Road in northwest city.
- William Donald Schaefer Hall at St. Mary's College of Maryland, in St. Mary's County where he served on the board of trustees for years
- Governor William Donald Schaefer International Terminal (Concourse E) at Baltimore-Washington International Thurgood Marshall Airport (BWI)
- William Donald Schaefer Auditorium at The Baltimore City College (a public high school), where Schaefer had graduated in the centennial class of 1939, and was responsible for the funding of $10 million for a major renovation in 1977–1979.

== See also ==
- Culture of Baltimore

Party political offices
Preceded by Harry Hughes	Democratic nominee for Governor of Maryland; 1986, 1990	Succeeded by Parris Glendening
Political offices
Preceded by Thomas L. J. D'Alesandro III	Mayor of Baltimore; 1971–1987	Succeeded by Clarence H. Burns
Preceded by Harry R. Hughes	Governor of Maryland; January 21, 1987 – January 18, 1995	Succeeded by Parris Glendening
Preceded by Robert L. Swann	Comptroller of Maryland; January 25, 1999 – January 22, 2007	Succeeded by Peter Franchot
