= 1971 Murray by-election =

Australian federal by-election

A by-election was held for the Australian House of Representatives seat of Murray on 20 March 1971. This was triggered by the resignation of former Country Party leader and interim Prime Minister John McEwen.

The by-election was won by Country Party candidate Bruce Lloyd.

== Results ==
Murray by-election, 1971
Party	Candidate	Votes	%	±%
Country	Bruce Lloyd	19,710	43.0	−10.3
Labor	John Riordan	11,670	25.5	+2.3
Liberal	Bill Hunter	9,622	21.0	+21.0
Democratic Labor	Brian Lacey	4,316	9.4	−0.2
Independent	Matthew Flynn	535	1.2	+1.2
Total formal votes		45,853	97.6	
Informal votes		1,116	2.4	
Turnout		46,969	94.2	
Two-party-preferred result
Country	Bruce Lloyd		71.5	−3.0
Labor	John Riordan		28.5	+3.0
Country hold		Swing	−3.0	
