= Bruce Lloyd =

Australian politician

Bruce Lloyd AM
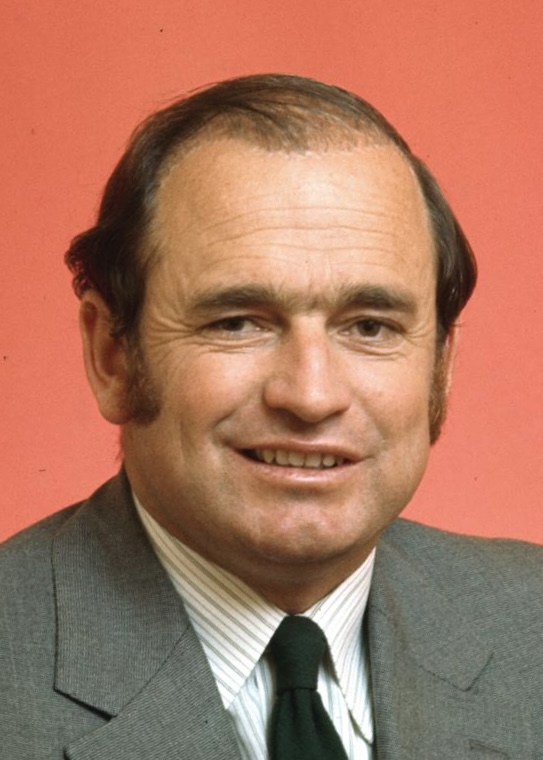

Deputy Leader of the National Party
- In office 24 July 1987 – 23 March 1993
- Leader: Ian Sinclair; Charles Blunt; Tim Fischer
- Preceded by: Ralph Hunt
- Succeeded by: John Anderson

Member of the Australian Parliament for Murray
- In office 20 March 1971 – 29 January 1996
- Preceded by: John McEwen
- Succeeded by: Sharman Stone

Personal details
- Born: 24 February 1937 (age 89) Brighton, Victoria, Australia
- Party: National
- Spouse: Heather Lloyd
- Occupation: Farmer

Bruce Lloyd, AM (born 24 February 1937) is a former Australian politician. He was deputy leader of the National Party from 1987 to 1993 and served in the House of Representatives from 1971 to 1996, representing the Victorian seat of Murray.

== Early life ==
Lloyd was born on 24 February 1937 in Brighton, Victoria. He attended at Rochester High School before completing his secondary education at the Geelong College from 1952 to 1954.

Before entering parliament Lloyd was a farmer at Timmering, near Rochester. He was elected state president of the Young Farmers of Victoria in 1959. He served on the board of a Rochester herd improvement co-operative and in 1968 was appointed to the board of the Victorian Artificial Breeders Co-operative Society (now Genetics Australia).

== Politics ==
Lloyd served as state president of the Victorian Country Party from 1969 to 1971.

In December 1970, Lloyd won Country Party preselection for the federal seat of Murray, then held by the party's federal leader John McEwen. He was elected to the House of Representatives at the 1971 Murray by-election which followed McEwen's retirement from politics.

Lloyd was included in Billy Snedden's shadow ministry in June 1974 as opposition spokesman on health. He retained the role under Snedden's successor Malcolm Fraser, but was not appointed Minister for Health in Fraser's interim ministry after the Whitlam dismissal in November 1975, despite continuing to serve as a spokesman on health policy during the 1975 federal election campaign. He did later serve as a parliamentary secretary from 1980 to 1983 in the Department of Primary Industry.

On 23 July 1987, he was elected Deputy Leader of the National Party, a position in which he remained until 23 March 1993. He was the only person to serve as deputy to three Nationals leaders (Ian Sinclair, Charles Blunt and Tim Fischer). He retired in 1996.

Parliament of Australia
Preceded by John McEwen	Member for Murray; 1971–1996	Succeeded by Sharman Stone
Party political offices
Preceded by Ralph Hunt	Deputy Leader of the National Party of Australia; 1987–1993	Succeeded by John Anderson
