= 1971 Egyptian parliamentary election =

- 27 October 1971
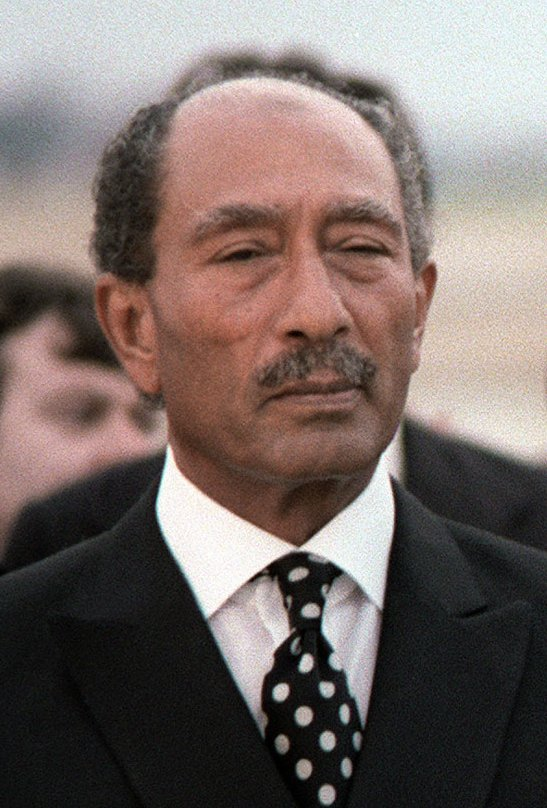
	First party
Leader	Anwar Sadat
Party	ASU
Seats won	350
Percentage	100%
Prime Minister before election
Mahmoud Fawzi
ASU
Subsequent Prime Minister
Mahmoud Fawzi
ASU

Early parliamentary elections were held in Egypt on 27 October 1971, with a second round for 141 seats taking place on 3 November, following the adoption of a new constitution in September 1971. At the time the country was a one-party state and all candidates had to be members of the Arab Socialist Union (ASU). Two candidates were elected from each of the 175 constituencies (although the six constituencies in Sinai and Suez were not contested and their representatives appointed by the President), with a second round of voting required if one or both of the candidates failed to win over 50% of the vote in the first round, or neither of the candidates with over 50% were classed as a worker or farmer (each constituency had to have at least one farmer or worker representing it). In total, 1,661 candidates contested the elections.

Following the elections, a further 10 members were appointed by the president.

== Results ==
Party	Seats	+/–
Arab Socialist Union	350	0
Presidential appointees	10	0
Total	360	0
Source: IPU
