= 1971 Egyptian constitutional referendum =

- 11 September 1971
- Outcome: Egyptian Constitution of 1971 enacted

Results
Choice	Votes	%
Yes	7,862,617	99.98%
No	1,363	0.02%
Valid votes	7,863,980	99.95%
Invalid or blank votes	3,640	0.05%
Total votes	7,867,620	100.00%
Registered voters/turnout	8,002,759	98.31%

A constitutional referendum was held in Egypt on 11 September 1971. The changes to the constitution were approved by 99.98% of voters, with a turnout of 98%.

== Results ==
Choice	Votes	%
For	7,862,617	99.98
Against	1,363	0.02
Total	7,863,980	100.00
Valid votes	7,863,980	99.95
Invalid/blank votes	3,640	0.05
Total votes	7,867,620	100.00
Registered voters/turnout	8,002,759	98.31
Source: Nohlen et al.
