= Melvin Steinberg =

American politician (1933–2026)

Melvin A. Steinberg

5th Lieutenant Governor of Maryland
- In office January 21, 1987 – January 18, 1995
- Governor: William Donald Schaefer
- Preceded by: J. Joseph Curran, Jr.
- Succeeded by: Kathleen Kennedy Townsend

President of the Maryland State Senate
- In office January 1983 – January 1987
- Preceded by: James Clark Jr.
- Succeeded by: Thomas V. Mike Miller Jr.

Member of the Maryland Senate
- In office January 1967 – January 1987
- Preceded by: Constituency established
- Succeeded by: Paula Hollinger
- Constituency: 13th district (1967–1975); 12th district (1975–1983); 11th district (1983–1987)

Personal details
- Born: October 4, 1933 Baltimore, Maryland, U.S.
- Died: March 10, 2026 (aged 92) Baltimore, Maryland, U.S.
- Party: Democratic
- Spouse: Anita Akman
- Children: 3
- Profession: Attorney at law

Melvin A. Steinberg (October 4, 1933 – March 10, 2026) was an American politician who served as the fifth lieutenant governor of Maryland from 1987 to 1995, under Governor William Donald Schaefer. He previously served as the president of the Maryland Senate from January 1983 to 1987, and a member of the Maryland Senate from 1967 until his election to the position of lieutenant governor.

== Early life and education ==
Steinberg was born in Baltimore on October 4, 1933. His parents were Russian immigrants, and his father, Irvin Steinberg, founded a grocery store where Mickey worked after school. Steinberg attended Baltimore Public Schools and graduated from the University of Baltimore with an A.A. degree in 1952 and with a J.D. degree in 1955.

He later enlisted in the U.S. Navy for two years, starting a law practice after returning.

== Career ==
Steinberg was elected to the Maryland Senate in 1966, later becoming the vice chair of the Senate Judicial Proceedings Committee until 1978. He became the president of the Senate Finance Committee in 1978 after cutting a deal with James Clark Jr., who successfully ran for president of the Maryland Senate after Steny Hoyer opted to run for lieutenant governor with Blair Lee III. He defeated Clark to become president of the Maryland Senate in 1982, mounting a campaign backed by state senators Thomas V. Miller Jr. and Clarence W. Blount. During his presidency, he was a key player in addressing a number of crises in the state, including the savings and loan crisis triggered by the failure of Old Court Savings and Loans.

He was elected lieutenant governor of Maryland in 1986, when he ran on a ticket with Baltimore mayor William Donald Schaefer. During his tenure, Steinberg was involved with modernizing the Maryland State Police's aviation unit and the building of Oriole Park at Camden Yards and later the complex that would include M&T Bank Stadium and the Baltimore Ravens. Steinberg's relationship with Governor Schaefer was strained, with each publicly criticising the other and extensive coverage being devoted to their personal relationship. Despite their differences, they worked together for eight years (1987–1995), winning two elections in the process.

Steinberg ran for the Democratic gubernatorial nomination in 1994, launching his campaign pledging a war on crime. He was defeated in the Democratic primary by Parris Glendening, who went on to become governor, after only managing to secure third place with 15% of the vote. Steinberg then took up a career in lobbying.

In 1998, he drew criticism for supporting the Republican candidate for governor, Ellen Sauerbrey, rather than endorsing Glendening in his bid for re-election; Sauerbrey was a critic of abortion and of gun control, positions opposite those held by Steinberg. In 2018, he again endorsed the Republican nominee for governor, incumbent Larry Hogan, over the Democratic nominee, Ben Jealous.

== Personal life and death ==
Steinberg was Jewish. He was married to Anita Akman and had three children, a son and two daughters.

Steinberg died under hospice care in Baltimore on March 10, 2026, at the age of 92. Current Maryland Governor Wes Moore and former Maryland Governor Larry Hogan were among those who paid tribute.

Political offices
Preceded by James Clark Jr.	President of the Maryland State Senate; 1983–1987	Succeeded by Thomas V. Mike Miller, Jr.
Preceded by J. Joseph Curran Jr.	Lieutenant Governor of Maryland; 1987–1995	Succeeded by Kathleen Kennedy Townsend
