= Julie-Ann Guivarra =

Australian diplomat

Julie-Ann Guivarra (born in Cairns) is an Australian diplomat who was the first Indigenous person to serve as a senior executive in the Australian Foreign Ministry and the first Indigenous woman to represent Australia as an ambassador, serving as Ambassador to Spain from 2018 to 2020 with non-resident accreditation to Andorra and Equatorial Guinea. In May 2020, she was appointed as Australia's Ambassador for Gender Equality.

== Early life and education ==
Guivarra was born in Cairns, Queensland, and is of both Aboriginal and Torres Strait Islander heritage. Her great-grandfather was a Filipino pearl diver who married a Torres Strait Islander. She was the first in her family to go to university, earning a bachelor's degree in Commerce at James Cook University and a Master of Arts (Foreign Affairs and Trade) from Monash University.

== Career ==
Guivarra began working for the Department of Foreign Affairs and Trade after finishing university in 1997. She held assistant secretary and director roles and served in Geneva as a counsellor at the World Trade Organization. She was posted to India and worked on trade policy in the Regional Comprehensive Economic Partnership (RCEP) negotiations. She also served as Assistant Secretary of the South East Asia Analytical and Effectiveness Branch.

In 2018, Guivarra was appointed Australia's ambassador to Spain, Andorra, and Equatorial Guinea. She finished in the role in January 2020 and was replaced by Sophia McIntyre.

In March 2020, on International Women's Day, Foreign Affairs Minister and Minister for Women Marise Payne announced the appointed of Guivarra as Ambassador for Gender Equality, the fourth person to hold the role after it was created in 2011. The purpose of the role is to ensure that gender equality and empowerment of women and girls is a "key focus of Australia’s diplomatic, development, and regional security efforts".

== Publications ==
- Guivarra, Julie-Ann (2015). "WTO accession negotiations: trends and results in agriculture plurilaterals". In Uri Dadush (ed.). WTO Accessions and Trade Multilateralism: Case Studies and Lessons from the WTO at Twenty. Cambridge University Press. doi:10.1017/CBO9781316144893. ISBN 9781316144893.
- Guivarra, Julie-Ann (8 July 2020). "From crisis to opportunity: Empowering women and girls as we respond to COVID-19". Philanthropy Australia.
