= 1971 Andorran parliamentary election =

- 14 December 1971 (first round); 21 December 1971 (second round)
- 12 of the 24 seats in the General Council
Party	Vote %	Seats	+/–
Independents	100	12	0
This lists parties that won seats. See the complete results below.

Parliamentary elections were held in Andorra on 14 December 1971 to elect half of the members of the General Council. In constituencies where not all seats were filled in the first round, a second round was held on 21 December.

The elections were the first after women were granted the right to vote in 1970. They were held alongside local elections.

== Electoral system ==
Each parish had four seats in the General Council. The seats were elected on a staggered basis, with two members elected from each parish every two years. In Andorra la Vella parish two members represented the town of Andorra la Vella and two represented Les Escaldes, with one member elected from each every two years.

All candidates had to run on lists of candidates, although voters could split their votes between candidates on different lists. Any candidate receiving a majority of the vote was elected in the first round. If there were remaining seats to fill, a second round was held, in which candidates had to receive a majority of the vote to be elected. If there were still remaining seats to fill, a third round would be held in which the candidate(s) with the most votes would be elected.

== Results ==
Party	First round			Second round			Total seats
Party	Votes	%	Seats	Votes	%	Seats	Total seats
Independents			9			3	12
Total			9			3	12
Registered voters/turnout	2,344	–		822	–		
Source: La Vanguardia

=== Elected members ===
Constituency	Elected members	Round
Andorra la Vella		Second round
Canillo		Second round
Canillo		Second round
Encamp	Josep Mas Font	First round
Encamp	Enric Paris Torres	First round
La Massana	Gil Font Molné	First round
La Massana	Salvador Mora Calvet	First round
Les Escaldes	Josep Maria Barbat Pla	First round
Ordino	Pere Babi Baró	First round
Ordino	Artur Comas Pons	First round
Sant Julià de Lòria	Òscar Ribas Reig	First round
Sant Julià de Lòria	Ladislau Baró Solà	First round
Source: La Vanguardia
