= Whitlam (surname) =

Whitlam is a surname. Notable people with the surname include:

- Fred Whitlam (1884–1961), Australia's Crown Solicitor from 1936 to 1949, pioneer of international human rights law in Australia; father of Gough Whitlam
- Freda Whitlam (1920-2018), Australian educator and religious leader
- Gough Whitlam (1916–2014), 21st Prime Minister of Australia
- Margaret Whitlam (1919–2012), wife of Gough Whitlam, author, social worker and champion swimmer
- Nicholas Whitlam (1945–), Australian businessman; son of Gough and Margaret Whitlam
- Olivia Whitlam (1985–), English rower
- Tony Whitlam (1944–), Australian lawyer, politician and judge; son of Gough and Margaret Whitlam
