= Tony Whitlam =

Australian politician (born 1944)

The Honourable Tony Whitlam KC

Member of the Australian Parliament for Grayndler
- In office 13 December 1975 – 10 December 1977
- Preceded by: Fred Daly
- Succeeded by: Frank Stewart

Justice of the Federal Court of Australia
- In office 1 January 1993 – 1 May 2005

Additional Judge of the Supreme Court of the ACT
- In office 7 April 1995 – 30 April 2005

Personal details
- Born: 7 January 1944 (age 82) Sydney, New South Wales, Australia
- Party: Australian Labor Party
- Parent(s): Gough Whitlam (father); Margaret Whitlam (mother)
- Relatives: Fred Whitlam (grandfather); Bill Dovey (grandfather); Nicholas Whitlam (brother); Freda Whitlam (aunt); William Griffith Dovey (uncle)
- Education: Australian National University
- Occupation: Lawyer

Antony Philip Whitlam KC (born 7 January 1944) is an Australian lawyer who has been a politician and judge. He is the son of Gough Whitlam (former Prime Minister) and Margaret Whitlam.

== Early life and education ==
Whitlam was born in Elizabeth Bay, Sydney, and educated at Sydney Boys High School (1956–60) and the Australian National University in Canberra, where he graduated in law.

== Career ==
=== Early legal career ===
Whitlam was called to the New South Wales bar in 1967.

In 1973, he became South East Asia regional counsel for Rank Xerox.

=== Political career ===
After several unsuccessful runs for preselection, Whitlam was elected in 1975 to the House of Representatives seat of Grayndler in central Sydney. His father Gough Whitlam was at that time the Leader of the Labor Party and had just been dismissed as Prime Minister by the Governor-General, Sir John Kerr. Labor was heavily defeated but Tony Whitlam easily won Grayndler. He became only the second federal MP to serve in the House at the same time as his father. He is also the only child of an Australian Prime Minister to be a federal MP (Kevin and Brendan Lyons, sons of Prime Minister Joseph Lyons, were Tasmanian state MPs).

In 1977, there was a redistribution of electoral boundaries in New South Wales, and the Division of Lang, adjoining Grayndler, was abolished. Whitlam ceded Labor preselection to the sitting Labor MP for Lang, Frank Stewart and stood for another seat, the marginal Liberal seat of St George, where he was defeated at the December 1977 election by the sitting Liberal member, Maurice Neil.

He attempted a return to federal politics in 1979, but was defeated in a preselection battle for the seat of Grayndler.

During his time as a member of the Federal ALP Caucus, Whitlam got to vote for his father as leader twice, the first in January 1976 the month after the 1975 election defeat and in May 1977 when Bill Hayden launched an unsuccessful challenge against him.

He returned to the Sydney bar, where he had a successful career.

=== Judicial appointments ===
Whitlam was appointed a judge of the Federal Court of Australia in 1993. In 1995 he was also appointed a judge of the Supreme Court of the Australian Capital Territory. Whitlam was one of only six politicians to have served in both the Parliament of Australia and the Federal Court of Australia, alongside Nigel Bowen, Robert Ellicott, Merv Everett, John Reeves and Duncan Kerr.

After retiring from his judgeships, Whitlam returned again to the bar.

Parliament of Australia
| Preceded by Fred Daly | Member for Grayndler; 1975–1977 | Succeeded by Frank Stewart |
