= Margaret Whitlam =

Australian social campaigner and athlete

Margaret Whitlam AO
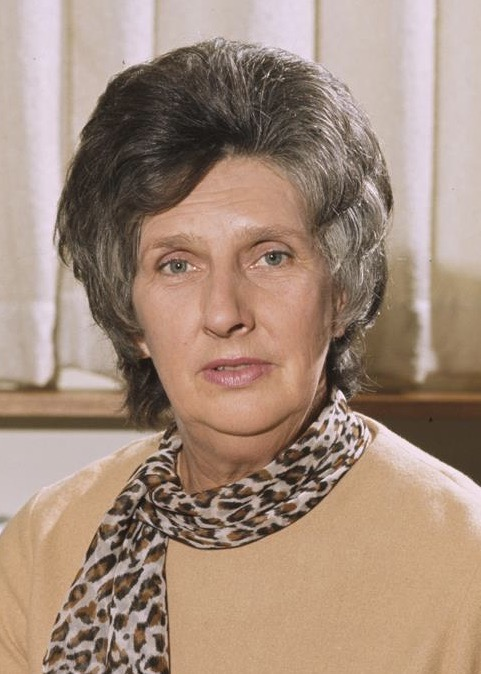
- Margaret Whitlam in 1972

Spouse of the Prime Minister of Australia
- In role 5 December 1972 – 11 November 1975
- Preceded by: Sonia McMahon
- Succeeded by: Tamie Fraser

Personal details
- Born: Margaret Elaine Dovey; 19 November 1919 Bondi, New South Wales, Australia
- Died: 17 March 2012 (aged 92) Sydney, New South Wales, Australia
- Party: Labor
- Spouse: Edward Gough Whitlam (m. 1942)
- Children: 4, including Tony and Nicholas
- Parents: Bill Dovey; Mary Dorothy Duncan
- Relatives: William Griffith Dovey (brother); Fred Whitlam (father-in-law); Freda Whitlam (sister-in-law)
- Education: SCEGGS Darlinghurst; University of Sydney
- Occupation: Social worker

Margaret Elaine Whitlam AO (née Dovey; 19 November 1919 – 17 March 2012) was an Australian social campaigner, author, and athlete. She was a representative of Australia in swimming at the 1938 British Empire Games in Sydney. Her husband was Edward Gough Whitlam, the 21st prime minister of Australia from 1972 to 1975.

== Early life ==
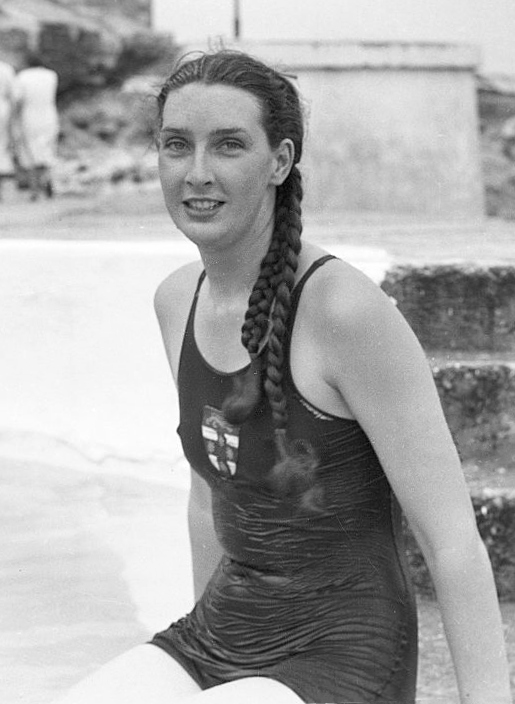
Margaret Dovey in 1939

Born Margaret Dovey in Bondi, New South Wales, she was the daughter of Wilfred Robert "Bill" Dovey, a New South Wales Supreme Court judge and Mary Dorothy Duncan. She attended SCEGGS Darlinghurst, where she excelled at sport. She grew to stand 188 cm (6 ft 2 in) tall, towering over most other women. At the 1938 British Empire Games in Sydney, she represented Australia in the 220-yard breaststroke, placing sixth out of seven swimmers. Dovey began an economics degree at the University of Sydney in 1938 before transferring to social work after two years of study. She graduated with a Diploma of Social Studies, and then began working at Parramatta District Hospital.

== Marriage and children ==
Dovey married Gough Whitlam, a Royal Australian Air Force officer, in April 1942 in St Michael's Church of England, Vaucluse. Whitlam's 194 cm (6 ft 4 in) height was one of the reasons that Margaret described him as "quite the most delicious thing I'd ever seen". Her husband was elected to federal parliament in 1952 and became federal opposition leader and parliamentary leader of the Australian Labor Party in 1967. Margaret was described as "deeply and loyally in love" with her husband.

Together, they had four children: Tony (7 January 1944), who has been a barrister, federal MP and a judge; Nicholas (6 December 1945), who became a prominent merchant banker and businessman; Stephen (April 1950), a diplomat, and Caroline Whitlam (2 February 1954), who later changed her name to Catherine Dovey after she lost a job because of her family name; she is married to former News Limited Chief Executive Officer Kim Williams. In between Stephen and Catherine, in about 1952 or 1953, Margaret Whitlam had miscarried another child.

== Advocacy and public life ==
Upon Gough Whitlam's election as Prime Minister, Margaret Whitlam quickly became known as an outspoken advocate for issues including women's rights, particularly abortion law reform and conservation; influenced by Germaine Greer. She faced widespread public criticism about her proactive role; however she refused to limit herself to traditional preconceptions. She was a regular guest speaker on radio and television, and wrote a column for the magazine Woman's Day, where she offered an insight into the life of a prime minister's wife. Whitlam was outspoken about the dismissal of the Whitlam government in 1975, saying she told her husband that he should have torn up the letter of dismissal from the Governor-General, Sir John Kerr.

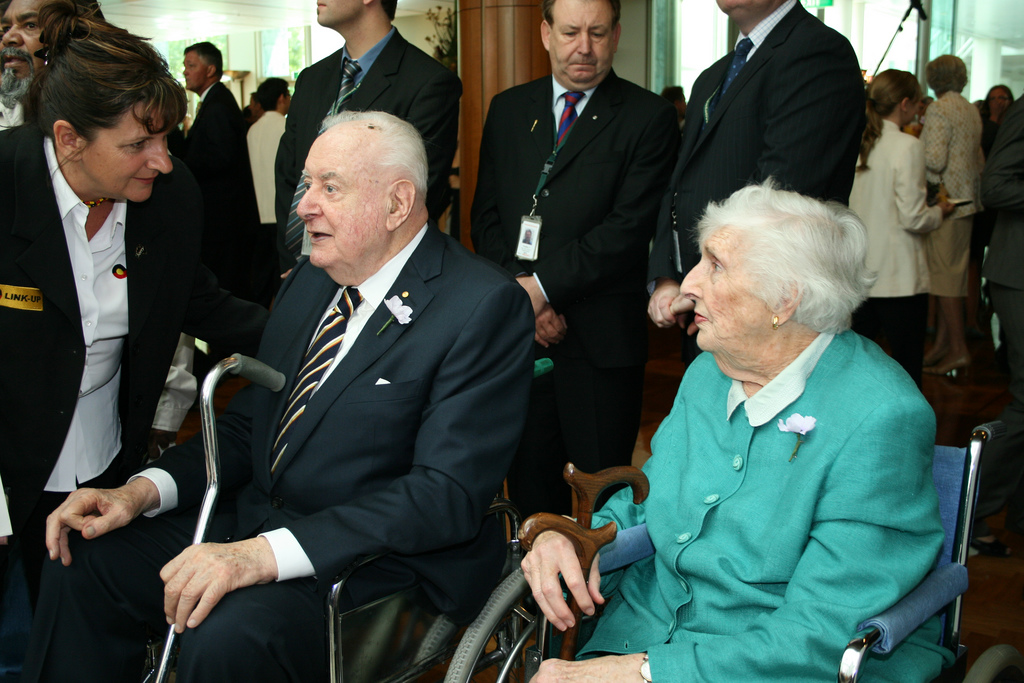
Gough and Margaret Whitlam at Parliament House, Canberra, for the national apology to the Stolen Generations in 2008

After the end of her husband's political career, Whitlam held a number of public and cultural offices, including serving as inaugural chair of the Australian Opera Conference; and on the boards of Sydney Dance Company between 1977 and 1982; International Literacy Year, International Women's Year (1975), and the Law Foundation of New South Wales. In 2006, she criticised Janette Howard, wife of then-Prime Minister John Howard, for what she considered a lack of commitment to community activities. Mrs Whitlam also criticised Mrs Howard for having no sense of humour and that she should not be holding hands with her husband in public. Mrs Howard declined to comment on Mrs Whitlam's criticism. Whitlam has since stated that they do not stand by what they said however, has not apologised

== Honours ==
Whitlam was appointed an Officer of the Order of Australia in 1983 for services to the community. In 1995 she was awarded an honorary degree of Doctor of Letters by the University of New England and, in 1997, became one of the one hundred Australian National Living Treasures. In 2001 she received a Centenary Medal "For outstanding service to Australian society and to the Australian community". In 2007 she and her husband were made national life members of the Australian Labor Party.

== Published works ==
- Whitlam, Margaret (1974). My day. Collins. p. 142. ISBN 978-0-00-211435-6.
- Whitlam, Margaret (2001). My Other World. Allen & Unwin. p. 221. ISBN 978-1-86508-540-1.

== Death and funeral ==
Whitlam died in a Sydney hospital on 17 March 2012, following a fall. The Whitlam family declined an offer from the Australian Government for a state funeral. A memorial service was held in St James' Church, Sydney on 23 March 2012. The Rev Andrew Sempell gave the sermon, taking love as his theme, using readings from Isaiah 43:1–5 and 1 Corinthians 13. He said: "Margaret Whitlam was indeed a gifted and talented person who used her abilities for the benefit of others, and we celebrate that." The service was attended by her widower Gough Whitlam, Prime Minister Julia Gillard, former Prime Ministers Malcolm Fraser, Bob Hawke, Paul Keating and Kevin Rudd, as well as other present and past politicians.

== See also ==
- Spouse of the Prime Minister of Australia

Honorary titles
Preceded by Sonia McMahon	Spouse of the Prime Minister of Australia; 5 December 1972 – 11 November 1975	Succeeded by Tamie Fraser
