= Nicholas Whitlam =

Australian businessman

- Born: Nicholas Richard Whitlam; 6 December 1945 (age 80)
- Education: Harvard College (1967); London Business School (1969)
- Parent(s): Gough Whitlam; Margaret Whitlam
- Relatives: Fred Whitlam (grandfather); Bill Dovey (grandfather); Tony Whitlam (brother); Freda Whitlam (aunt); William Griffith Dovey (uncle)
- Website: www.nicholaswhitlam.com

Nicholas Richard Whitlam (born 6 December 1945) is an Australian businessman and corporate director. He is the son of former Prime Minister Gough Whitlam and Margaret Whitlam.

== Career ==
Whitlam first became publicly prominent in 1981 when he was appointed chief executive of the State Bank of New South Wales. Subsequent roles include Whitlam Turnbull & Co (an investment banking partnership with future Prime Minister Malcolm Turnbull and former Premier of New South Wales Neville Wran), and the chairmanship of the NRMA Group. Whitlam was the key figure in the 2000 demutualization and listing of NRMA Insurance, the country's largest insurance company, now known as Insurance Australia Group (IAG).

In 2002, the Australian Securities & Investments Commission (ASIC), a corporate regulator, initiated controversial civil proceedings against Whitlam alleging breaches of his NRMA director's duties in relation to his not signing a proxy vote, consisting of 3793 votes, directing him to vote against a motion about the remuneration of directors. A single judge of the Supreme Court of New South Wales ruled that he had breached his duties as a director and banned him from being a director of any company for five years. Whitlam appealed the judgement. Three senior judges, sitting as the New South Wales Court of Appeal, unanimously found that he had not breached his duties as a director, reversed the ruling and exonerated him. ASIC sought but was denied special leave to appeal by the High Court of Australia.

Whitlam is a graduate of Harvard College (AB cum laude, 1967) and the London Business School (MSc, 1969).

He has been Chairman of the Australian Graduate School of Management at the University of New South Wales, and has an honorary doctorate (Hon.DUniv) from that university and from Western Sydney University (Hon.DLitt).

== Personal life ==
Whitlam has been married to Judy (née Frye) since 1973; she was a publicist for Vidal Sassoon and the Savoy Hotel. Believing they were unable to conceive children of their own, they adopted a girl, Alice, from Thailand and a boy, Edward, from Colombia. Then Judy became pregnant, and their son, Peter, was born in 1982; he has severe mental and physical disabilities.
