= Whitlam (disambiguation) =

Gough Whitlam (1916–2014) was the 21st prime minister of Australia.

Whitlam may also refer to:

- Division of Whitlam, an electoral division in New South Wales
- Whitlam (surname), a list of people with the name
- Whitlam, Australian Capital Territory, a suburb of Canberra, Australian Capital Territory

== See also ==
- Whitlam Institute, Western Sydney University
- The Whitlams, an Australian indie rock band formed in late 1992
