= Eugene Gabriel Sayegh =

- Born: 7 May 1900; Auckland, New Zealand, British Empire
- Died: 30 July 1988 (aged 88); Sydney, New South Wales, Australia
- Education: University of Sydney
- Occupations: Solicitor, Barrister
- Spouse: Zoe Malouf (m. 1928)
- Children: 3 daughters

Eugene Gabriel Sayegh (7 May 1900 – 30 July 1988) was the first barrister in Australia of Syrian descent.

== Personal life ==
He moved from Auckland, New Zealand in 1917 where he attended Sacred Heart College, and went on to study at Sydney University. He was admitted to the bar in New South Wales in 1924, which made him the only Syrian barrister practising in the Commonwealth at the time.

In January 1928 Sayegh married Zoe Malouf, with whom he had 3 children. Sayegh retired in 1984 and died on 30 July 1988.

== Career ==
In 1946 Sayegh defeated Bill Dovey QC in a famous Sydney divorce case.
