= Clarence McKerihan =

Australian banker

Sir Clarence Roy McKerihan CBE JP
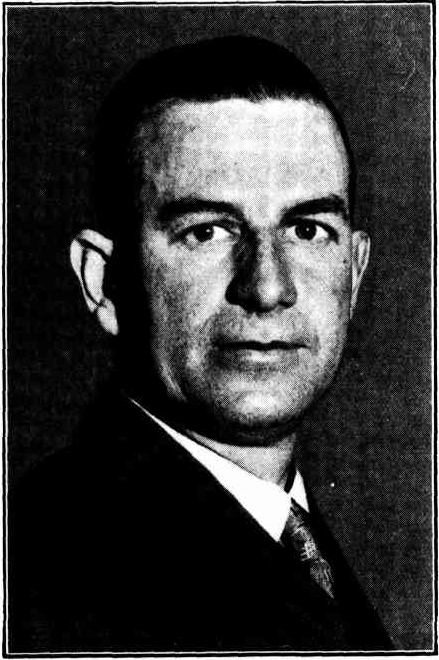
- McKerihan, photographed in 1934.
- Born: 6 May 1896; Tenterfield, New South Wales, Australia
- Died: 28 December 1969 (aged 73); Potts Point, New South Wales, Australia
- Education: Casino Superior Public School
- Occupation: Banker
- Office: President of the Rural Bank of New South Wales
- Term: 18 April 1934 – 6 May 1961
- Predecessor: William O'Malley Wood
- Successor: John Callachor Fletcher
- Spouse: Dorothy Juanita McCallum (m.1921)

Sir Clarence Roy McKerihan CBE JP (6 May 1896 – 28 December 1969), also known as Roy McKerihan or C. R. McKerihan, was an Australian banker who served as a commissioner and president of the Rural Bank of New South Wales for 27 years from 1933 to 1961.

== Early life and career ==
McKerihan was born on 6 May 1896 in Tenterfield, New South Wales, the son of Ulster Scots Irish-born draper Edward McKerihan and the Australian-born Elizabeth Jane Gillespie of Inverell. His name was chosen by his parents for the Clarence River, in a tribute to his family that had settled in the region. Edward McKerihan was a shopkeeper, and McKerihan received his education from state schools in Tamworth, Tenterfield, and later at the Superior Public School in Casino, where his father had set up business and became a prominent citizen through his service on the councils of St Andrew's Presbyterian Church Grafton, the Casino District Hospital, and the Casino Cricket Union. While at school McKerihan undertook six years' of service in the Casino brigade of the Australian Army Cadets.

In 1912, McKerihan began work as a junior clerk in the Casino branch of the Government Savings Bank of New South Wales, passed his NSW Institute of Bankers examination, and later moved in 1913 to the branch in Grafton, where his parents had moved. With the outbreak of war in 1914, at the age of 19 McKerihan enlisted in the Australian Imperial Force at Grafton on 26 May 1915, and was assigned to the 4th Battalion as a private departing Australia for Egypt on 16 June 1915. McKerihan was deployed to Gallipoli with the 4th Battalion and served during the Battle of Lone Pine. Following evacuation back to Tell El Kebir, Egypt, McKerihan was transferred to the 56th Battalion and promoted to lance corporal (29 September 1915), corporal (1 January 1916), and lance sergeant (14 February 1916). His brother, Harold George McKerihan, also served in Gallipoli as a lieutenant in the 2nd Battalion, where he was wounded and later died of his wounds in hospital in Alexandria.

In March 1916, he transferred to the Australian War Records Section, and saw service in France and Britain, being promoted to staff sergeant and then Warrant Officer Class I in 1917. While on leave in September 1917 he undertook a trip to scale Mont Blanc in the Alps with a fellow soldier. In 1919 he was awarded the Meritorious Service Medal, and returned to Australia on 15 May 1919 aboard the HMAT Orontes.

Following demobilisation and discharge in Australia on 7 September 1919, McKerihan returned to work at the Government Savings Bank, being appointed a loans officer at the bank head office at 11 Moore Street (later known as Martin Place) in Sydney, and later transferred to the rural department on its creation in 1921. On 17 August 1921 he married Dorothy Juanita McCallum at St Stephen's Presbyterian Church, Sydney. The marriage would produce two daughters, Dawn and Dell. After initially living in Bondi, from 1930 the McKerihans moved to a house, "Wingadee", 1 Davidson Parade, Cremorne, before moving to a flat in the Spanish Mission style "Silchester" building at 4 Trahlee Road, Bellevue Hill, from 1937. From 1943, the McKerihans were living in a house at 895 New South Head Road, Rose Bay.

By 1925 he had become president of the Government Savings Bank Officers' Association and in 1926 was vice-president and later president (1928) of the United Bank Officers' Association. In 1928 at the age of 32, McKerihan was appointed as chief clerk of the Rural Bank Department and was appointed a Justice of the Peace (JP) in November 1929.

== Rural Bank ==
By early 1931, the Government Savings Bank was in financial trouble in the midst of the Great Depression, and on 22 April 1931 the Bank suspended payments after a drain on its cash resources. On 15 December 1931, the majority of the Government Savings Bank was amalgamated into the Commonwealth Savings Bank. The Rural Bank and Advance Homes Departments of the Government Savings Bank were not taken over by the Commonwealth Savings Bank, and continued to operate. In late 1932, the NSW Government led by Assistant Treasurer Eric Spooner introduced legislation to reconstitute what remained of the Government Savings Bank into a new "Rural Bank of New South Wales", with a specific mandate to support primary industries and not to operate as a traditional general lending bank, governed by a board of three commissioners.

On 23 December 1932, the Rural Bank of New South Wales Act, 1932 was passed by the NSW Parliament, and on 1 July 1933 the new institution and board of commissioners commenced operations to replace the old Government Savings Bank. McKerihan was appointed to serve as one of the first three commissioners of the Bank, alongside William O'Malley Wood (president, and former chairman of the GSB) and Henry Rogers. O'Malley's term as president was intended to be a temporary one to facilitate the establishment of the new institution, and he retired in April 1934, with McKerihan at age 38 appointed to succeed him as president and general manager of the Rural Bank, commencing from 18 April 1934.

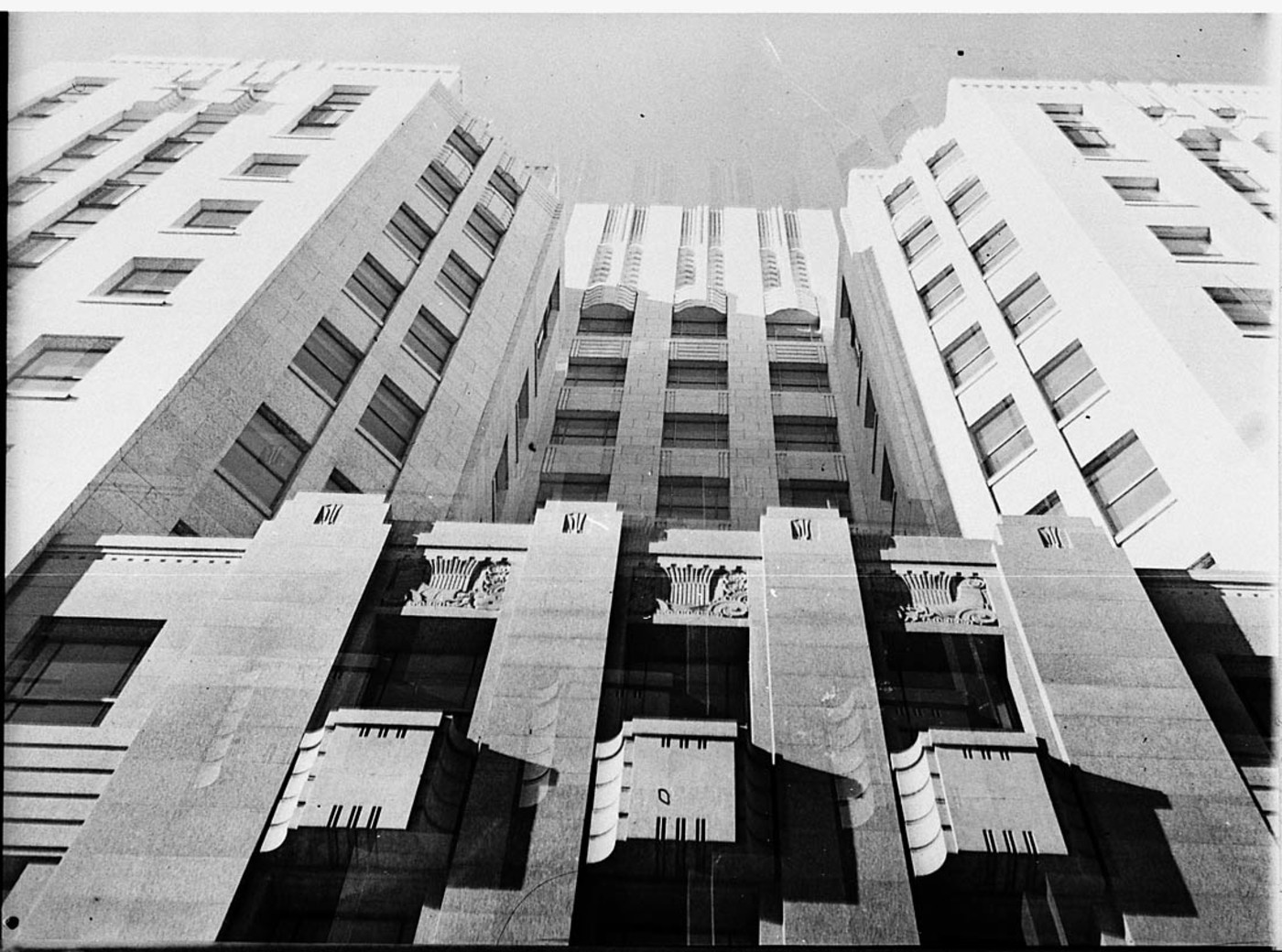
The Rural Bank Building on Martin Place, designed by the bank's in-house architect and completed in 1936. Its development and construction was spearheaded by McKerihan as a commissioner and president of the Bank.

McKerihan's appointment was praised for his young age and country background, with the Wellington Times noting:

"Mr. McKerihan is a man of outstanding ability, with a clear grasp of rural problems and an ability to appreciate the relationship between his bank and rural industries. Because he is country-minded, Mr. McKerihan has very definite views on closer settlement problems. Indeed it must be very largely credited to his initiative in formulating a policy that the Government of this State is today adopting a policy of closer settlement along lines identical with the views publicly expressed by Mr. McKerihan some time ago ... Mr. McKerihan has attained high rank in his early years, but we visualise an even greater future for him. He is a man of understanding, civility and ability, and his ready grasp of country problems and his willingness to appreciate and overcome difficulties confronting country settlers, must eventually place him and his bank at the head of the list of those most deserving of a country's thanks and honours."

During his long term as president of the bank, McKerihan was responsible for transitioning the bank out of the depression by encouraging greater investment in building and construction, for increasing assistance to rural small-holders, and liberalising advances and loans for rural housing. In 1953 the Rural Bank Homes Department was estimated to have made over 65,000 advances for a total of £46 million, with rural advances up to £62 million, since McKerihan had commenced his term as the bank's head.

McKerihan also led the efforts to build a new bank head office, acquiring a site on Martin Place for £77,734. Designed in the modern Art Deco style by the bank's chief architect, Frank William Turner, McKerihan laid one of the foundation stones in an official ceremony on 19 December 1935. The building was officially completed on 15 December 1936. The grand new edifice of the bank that was completed in December 1936 was praised for its dignified presentation and for its high proportion of Australian materials used in its construction.

With the outbreak of the Second World War, in March 1940 McKerihan was appointed honorary general secretary and federal administrator of the Australian Comforts Fund, which distributed various supplies and funds for the wellbeing, as well as providing hostels, for Australian services abroad. McKerihan had responsibility for coordinating the distribution of the various state funds and ensuring that comforts received priority. He permitted the executive committee to hold its Sydney meetings in the board room of the Rural Bank at Martin Place, and provided administrative assistance to the organisation through Rural Bank staff, ensuring that administrative costs of the £7-8 million ACF funds remained limited to only 3%. In August 1944 and July 1945, he undertook a tour of the ACF field facilities in New Guinea and Borneo, and then to occupied Japan in August 1945, and advocated for the importance of the comforts fund to soldiers following the end of the war in 1945, arguing it would be outrageous to reduce funds while services remained deployed overseas.

McKerihan remained as the head of the bank until his retirement after 27 years in May 1961. When he commenced his term as a bank commissioner in 1933, the bank had no branches and a staff of 310; this had increased to 57 branches and a staff of 1,500 in 1945, and by the time of his retirement in 1961, the Rural Bank had 134 branches.

== Later life ==
In 1938, McKerihan was appointed a director, and served as president (1946–1963), of the Crown Street Women's Hospital, and would chair the hospital's board until his retirement in 1963. A member of the Freemasons, and the Rotary and Legacy clubs of Sydney, McKerihan also held positions as president of the National Trust of Australia (NSW), councillor of the Australian-American Association, treasurer of the United Nations Association of Australia, trustee of Ku-ring-gai Chase National Park (1956–1963), federal director of the Arts Council of Australia, and an elder and deacon of St Stephen's Presbyterian Church, Macquarie Street. McKerihan was also a member of the Australian Club, the Royal Sydney Golf Club, and the Rose Bay Bowling Club.

A recipient of many awards, McKerihan was made a Commander of the Order of the British Empire (CBE) in the 1958 New Year Honours, and was made a Knight bachelor in the 1967 New Year Honours for "services to the rural community and to hospital and other welfare services". He was knighted by the Governor-General of Australia, Lord Casey, in a ceremony at Government House, Canberra on 31 March 1967. Survived by his wife and two daughters, he died at the age of 73 on 28 December 1969 at St Luke's Hospital, Potts Point, and was cremated.

== Honours ==
- Meritorious Service Medal, 1914–15 Star, British War Medal, Victory Medal, 1919.
- King George V Silver Jubilee Medal, 1935.
- King George VI Coronation Medal, 1937.
- Queen Elizabeth II Coronation Medal, 1953.
- Commander of the Order of the British Empire (CBE), 1958 New Year Honours.
- Knight bachelor, 1967 New Year Honours.

Business positions
Preceded by William O'Malley Wood	President of the Rural Bank of New South Wales; 1934 – 1961	Succeeded by John Callachor Fletcher
Medical appointments
Preceded by Alfred John Gibson	President of the Crown Street Women's Hospital; 1946 – 1963	Succeeded by Douglas Davidson
Non-profit organization positions
Preceded by Karl Reginald Cramp	President of the National Trust of Australia (NSW); 1949 – 1951	Succeeded by G. A. King
