= William Henry O'Malley Wood =

William Henry O’Malley Wood (15 June 1856 – 5 August 1941) was an Australian banker, public servant and surveyor. Wood was born in Grenfell, New South Wales and died in Vaucluse, Sydney, New South Wales. Wood served two terms as the President of the Government Savings Bank of New South Wales (1920–1928; 1931–1933) and was the first President of the Rural Bank of New South Wales (1933–1934). For his public service, Wood was awarded the King George V Silver Jubilee Medal in 1935.

Business positions
Preceded by Robert Alexander Warden	President of the Government Savings Bank of New South Wales; 1920 – 1928	Succeeded by Herbert Duncan Hall
Preceded by Herbert Duncan Hall	President of the Government Savings Bank of New South Wales; 1931 – 1933	Merged into the Rural Bank
New title	President of the Rural Bank of New South Wales; 1933 – 1934	Succeeded by Clarence McKerihan
