= State Bank of New South Wales =

Government-owned bank in New South Wales, Australia

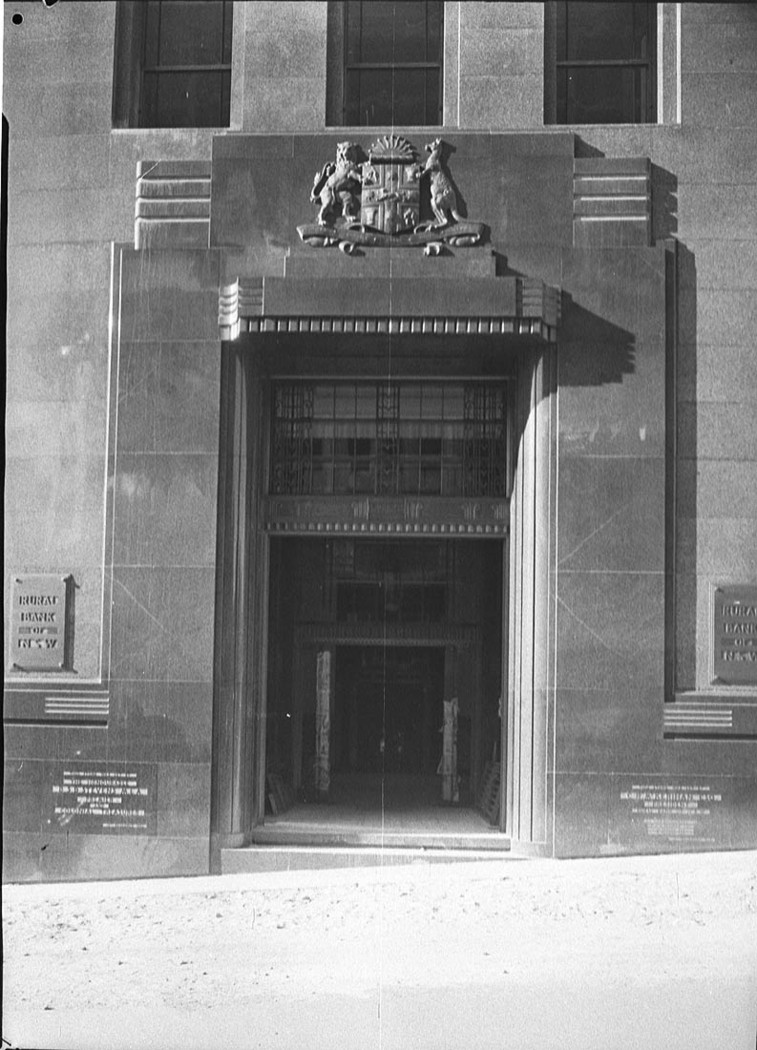
- The Martin Place entrance of the Rural Bank Head Office, 1936.
- Formerly: Rural Bank of New South Wales (1933–1981)
- Industry: Financial services
- Predecessor: Government Savings Bank of New South Wales
- Founded: 1 July 1933
- Defunct: 23 November 1994
- Successors: Colonial State Bank; Commonwealth Bank
- Headquarters: Rural Bank Building, Martin Place (1936–1982)
- Area served: New South Wales

The State Bank of New South Wales, from 1933 until 1981 known as the Rural Bank of New South Wales, was a bank owned by the Government of New South Wales. In 1994, it was taken over by Colonial Mutual and became the Colonial State Bank. It was sold to the Commonwealth Bank in 2000.

== History of operations ==
=== Founding and growth ===
In early 1931, the Government Savings Bank was in financial trouble in the midst of the Great Depression and, on 22 April 1931, the Bank suspended payments after a drain on its cash resources. On 15 December 1931, the majority of the Government Savings Bank was amalgamated with the Commonwealth Savings Bank.

However, the Rural Bank and Advance Homes Departments of the Government Savings Bank were not taken over by the Commonwealth Savings Bank, and continued to operate. In late 1932, the NSW Government, led by Assistant Treasurer Eric Spooner, introduced legislation to reconstitute what remained of the Government Savings Bank into a new "Rural Bank of New South Wales", governed by a board of three commissioners, with a specific mandate to support primary industries and not to operate as a traditional general lending bank.

On 23 December 1932, the Rural Bank of New South Wales Act, 1932 was passed by the NSW Parliament, and on 1 July 1933 the new institution and board of commissioners commenced operations to replace the old Government Savings Bank. The former chairman of the GSB, William O'Malley Wood, was appointed president and commissioner, with Clarence McKerihan and Henry Rogers appointed as commissioners.

On 19 December 1947, the NSW Parliament passed the Rural Bank of New South Wales (General Banking) Act, 1947, which merged the Rural Bank Department, the Advances for Homes Department, and the Personal Loans Department, into a General Bank Department, and authorised the bank to operate as a regular trading bank. About the change, the Premier of NSW, Jim McGirr, commented:

"The primary object of this important legislation is to widen the scope of the bank's functions in order to place it on an equal footing with other banks in this State. The measure is in accordance with the Government's policy of fostering an institution that has in the past provided a valuable service to the people and has assisted in implementing various governmental schemes."

=== State Bank ===
On 2 November 1981, the State Bank Act came into effect, which reconstituted the Rural Bank as the "State Bank of New South Wales", governed by a board of seven directors, and changed the mandate to that of a standard commercial bank. The bank's slogan for many years was "We do more for you personally". On the change of the Rural Bank to the State Bank, a former bank employee, Bruce R. Turner, later recalled:

In line with its motto, the [Rural] bank's customers were put first at every stage. For instance, if a customer thought he or she had been charged a fee unfairly, the branch staff had the delegation to make an assessment and waive the fee if the circumstances warranted.
As the 1980s progressed, the State Bank's stewardship changed and the business transformation accelerated. The bank's balance sheet became more highly leveraged, profitability became the key driver, and customer service standards started to decline. Many of the branch staff were the same, but a new culture was being framed. Delegations for local staff to make local decisions were wound back (including delegations to waive and refund unfair fees and charges).

While the Rural Bank used the full armorial of the NSW Coat of Arms, the State Bank used the simplified State Badge.

The bank was 'corporatised' in 1990, under the State Owned Corporations Act 1989 (NSW) and the State Bank (Corporatisation) Act 1989 (NSW). On 14 May 1990, the existing State Bank was dissolved, and all of its assets and business undertaking were vested in an incorporated State Bank, limited by shares.

=== Privatisation and merger ===
On 23 November 1994, the NSW Government sold the bank to Colonial Mutual, a financial services company, through the State Bank (Privatisation) Act 1994. Although initially retaining the State Bank name, the bank changed its name to Colonial State Bank in 1996. In 2000, it too was taken over, this time by the Commonwealth Bank.

== Executives ==
=== Rural Bank, 1933–1981 ===
The board of the Rural Bank consisted of three (later five) commissioners, appointed by the Governor on the advice of the Premier, for a term of seven years, with one of the commissioners appointed as president/general manager. A deputy president could also be appointed to fill in during a long period of absence of the president.

==== Presidents ====
#	Officeholder	Term start date	Term end date	Time in office	Notes
1	William O'Malley Wood	1 July 1933	17 April 1934	290 days	
2	Sir Clarence McKerihan	18 April 1934	6 May 1961	27 years, 18 days	
3	John Callachor Fletcher	6 May 1961	1 July 1971	10 years, 56 days	
4	Albert Oliver	1 July 1971	2 November 1981	10 years, 124 days	

==== Commissioners ====
Officeholder	Term start date	Term end date	Time in office	Notes
William O'Malley Wood	1 July 1933	17 April 1934	290 days	
Sir Clarence McKerihan	1 July 1933	6 May 1961	27 years, 309 days	
Henry Rogers	1 July 1933	14 November 1952	19 years, 136 days	
Patrick Kearns	18 April 1934	31 December 1948	14 years, 257 days	
John Callachor Fletcher	15 March 1950	1 July 1971	21 years, 108 days	
Bruce Sidney Smith	9 January 1953	11 June 1960	7 years, 154 days	
Sydney Manning Norton	12 June 1960	18 December 1963	3 years, 189 days	
Sir Norman Rydge	22 February 1961	5 March 1976	15 years, 12 days	
Sir James Frederick John Auswild	22 February 1961	2 November 1981	20 years, 253 days	
Edward Thomas Carroll	17 May 1961	1 June 1971	10 years, 15 days	
Robert Hewiston Cooper	18 December 1963	5 August 1971	7 years, 230 days	
Albert Oliver	1 July 1971	2 November 1981	10 years, 124 days	
Douglas Joseph Byrne	6 August 1971	1 October 1973	2 years, 56 days	
William Leslie Evans	2 June 1971	18 June 1975	4 years, 16 days	
Jim Ernest Frederick McKensey	1 October 1973	2 June 1980	6 years, 245 days	
Eric Randall Leslie Kay	19 June 1975	10 February 1980	4 years, 236 days	
Henry Percival Anderson	5 March 1976	2 November 1981	5 years, 242 days	
Kenneth George Dennewald	11 February 1980	2 November 1981	1 year, 264 days	
Nicholas Whitlam	2 June 1980	2 November 1981	1 year, 153 days	

=== State Bank, 1981–1994 ===
From 2 November 1981, the board of the State Bank consisted of seven directors appointed by the Governor on the advice of the Premier, with one of the directors appointed as managing director.

==== Managing Directors/CEO ====
#	Officeholder	Term start date	Term end date	Time in office	Notes
1	Nicholas Whitlam	2 November 1981	29 June 1987	5 years, 239 days	
2	John O'Neill	30 June 1987	23 November 1994	7 years, 146 days	

==== Directors ====
Officeholder	Term start date	Term end date	Time in office	Notes
Kenneth George Dennewald	2 November 1981	19 August 1984	2 years, 291 days	Deputy
Sir Roden Cutler	2 November 1981	3 November 1987	6 years, 1 day	Chairman
Henry Percival Anderson	2 November 1981	13 April 1989	7 years, 162 days	
Bruce K. Maitland	2 November 1981	3 November 1987	6 years, 1 day	
Robert C. Nicholls	2 November 1981	3 November 1987	6 years, 1 day	
Terrence Malcolm Griffir	26 February 1982	1 March 1985	3 years, 3 days	
Donald Graeme Adams	20 August 1984	1 February 1988	3 years, 165 days	Deputy
Reginald Garry Walter Murphy	1 March 1985	1 March 1988	3 years, 0 days	
Percy Allan	4 November 1987	1 March 1990	2 years, 117 days	
Graham John Kelly	4 November 1987	1 March 1990	2 years, 117 days	
David Lowy	4 November 1987	1 March 1990	2 years, 117 days	
Neville Watkins	1 March 1988	1 March 1990	2 years, 0 days	
David Greatorex	1 August 1988	21 June 1993	4 years, 324 days	Chairman 1990–1993
John Valder	14 April 1989	23 November 1994	5 years, 223 days	
Richard Austen	1 March 1990	23 November 1994	4 years, 267 days	
Richard Norman Hamilton Denton	1 March 1990	23 November 1994	4 years, 267 days	

== Former bank buildings ==
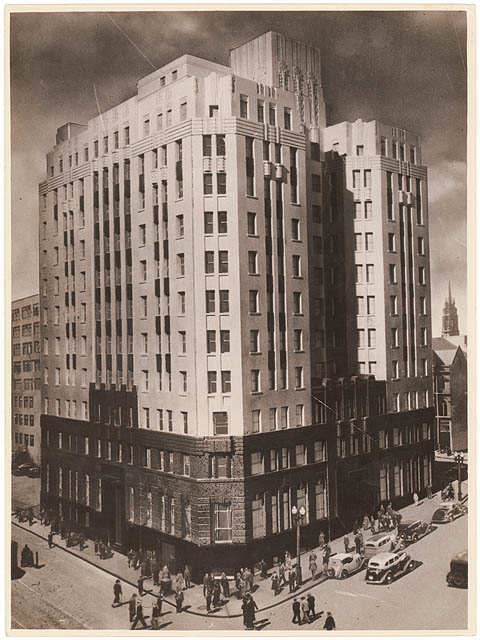
Former Rural Bank Head Office, Martin Place, Sydney, demolished in 1983.

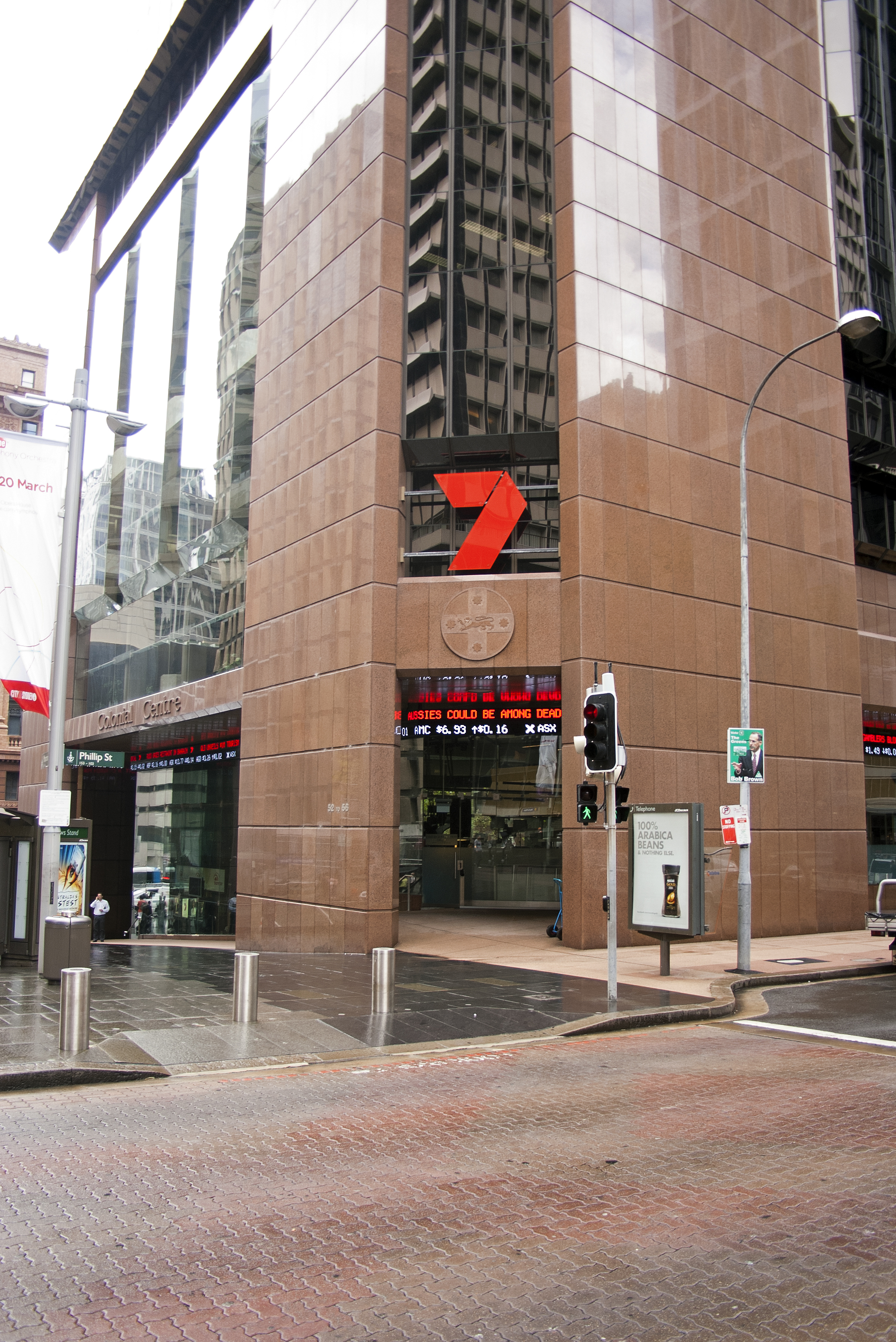
Former State Bank Head Office, Martin Place, Sydney, showing bank logo in granite facade

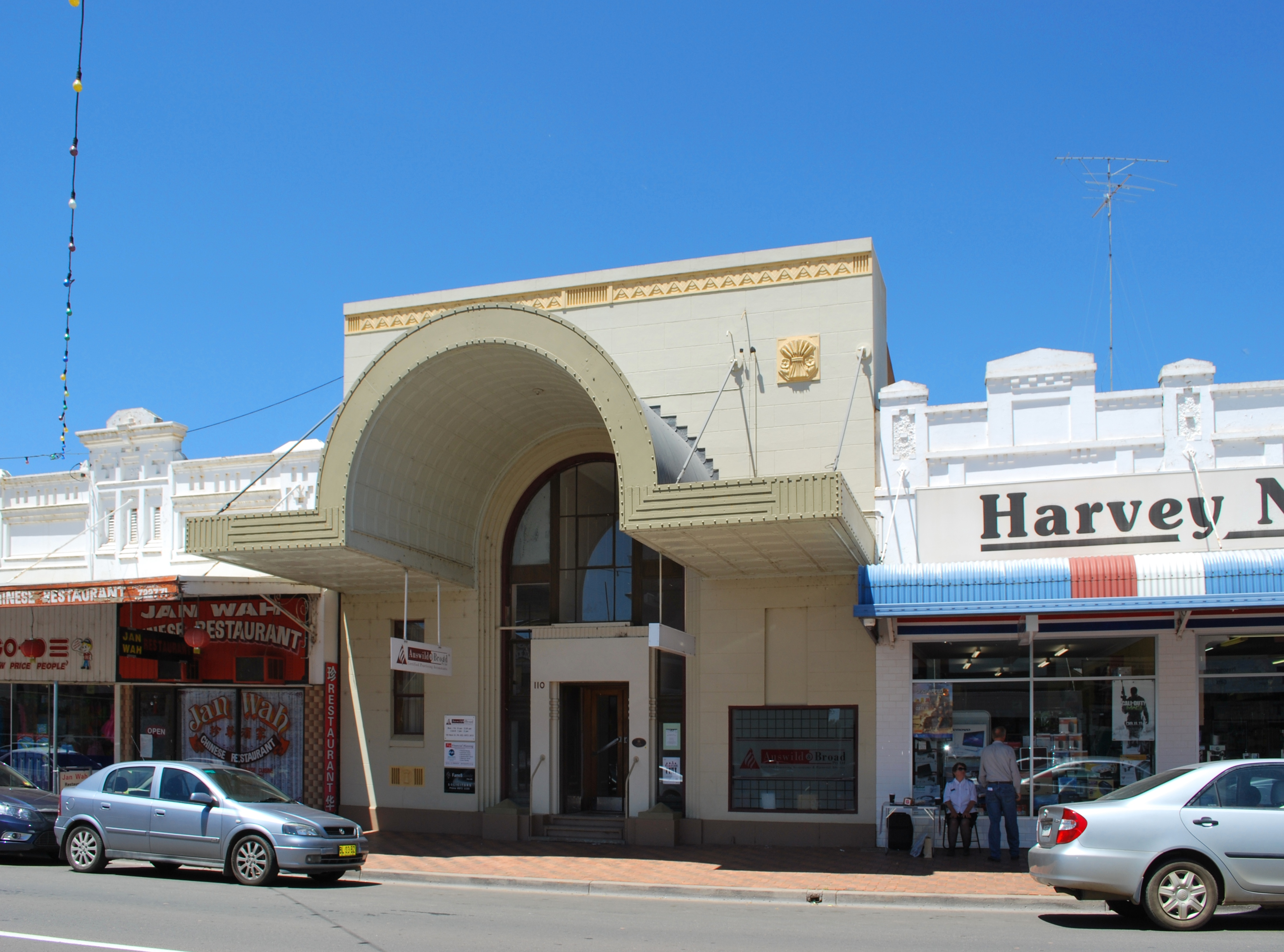
West Wyalong, New South Wales Branch

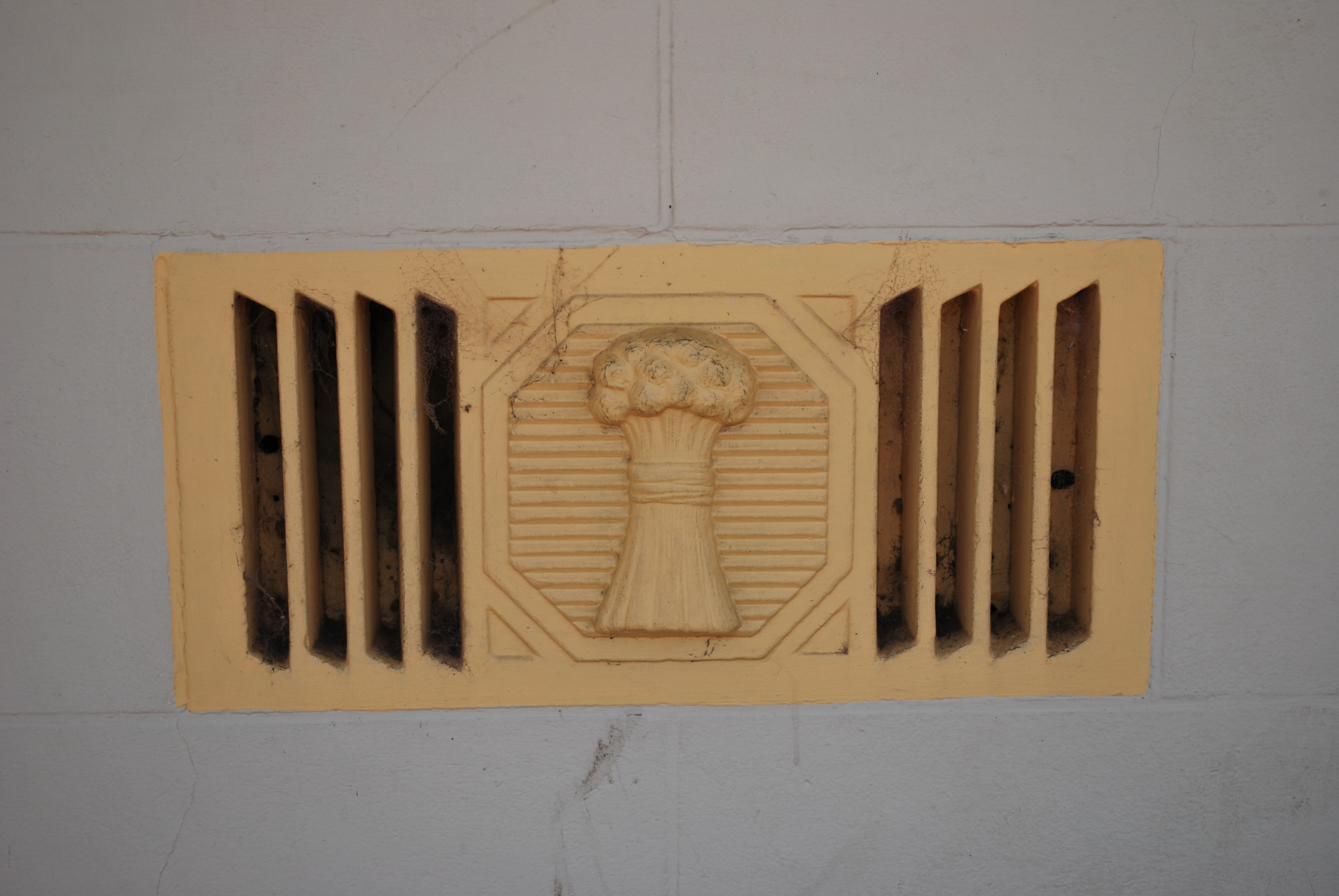
Detail West Wyalong Branch

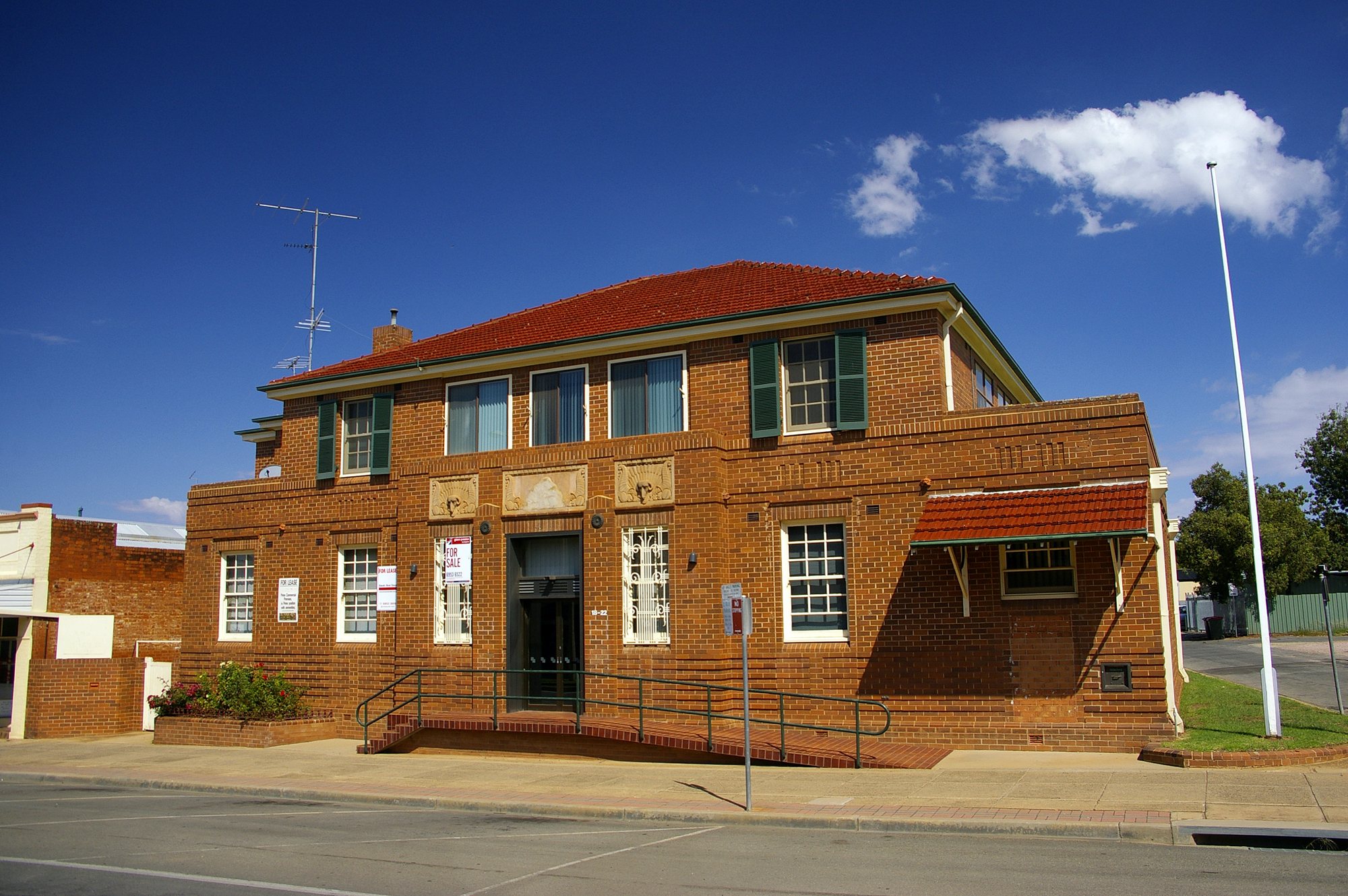
Leeton, New South Wales Branch

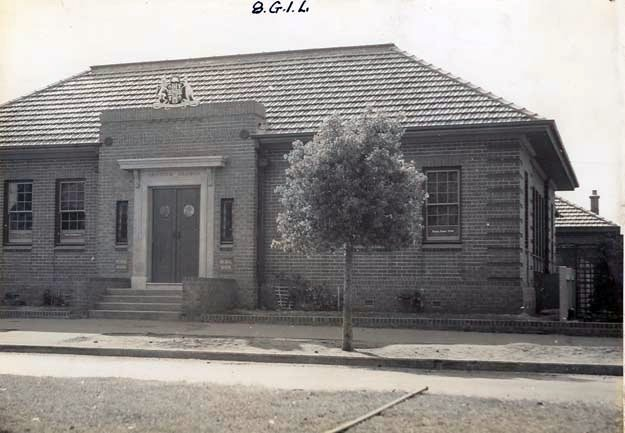
Griffith, New South Wales Branch

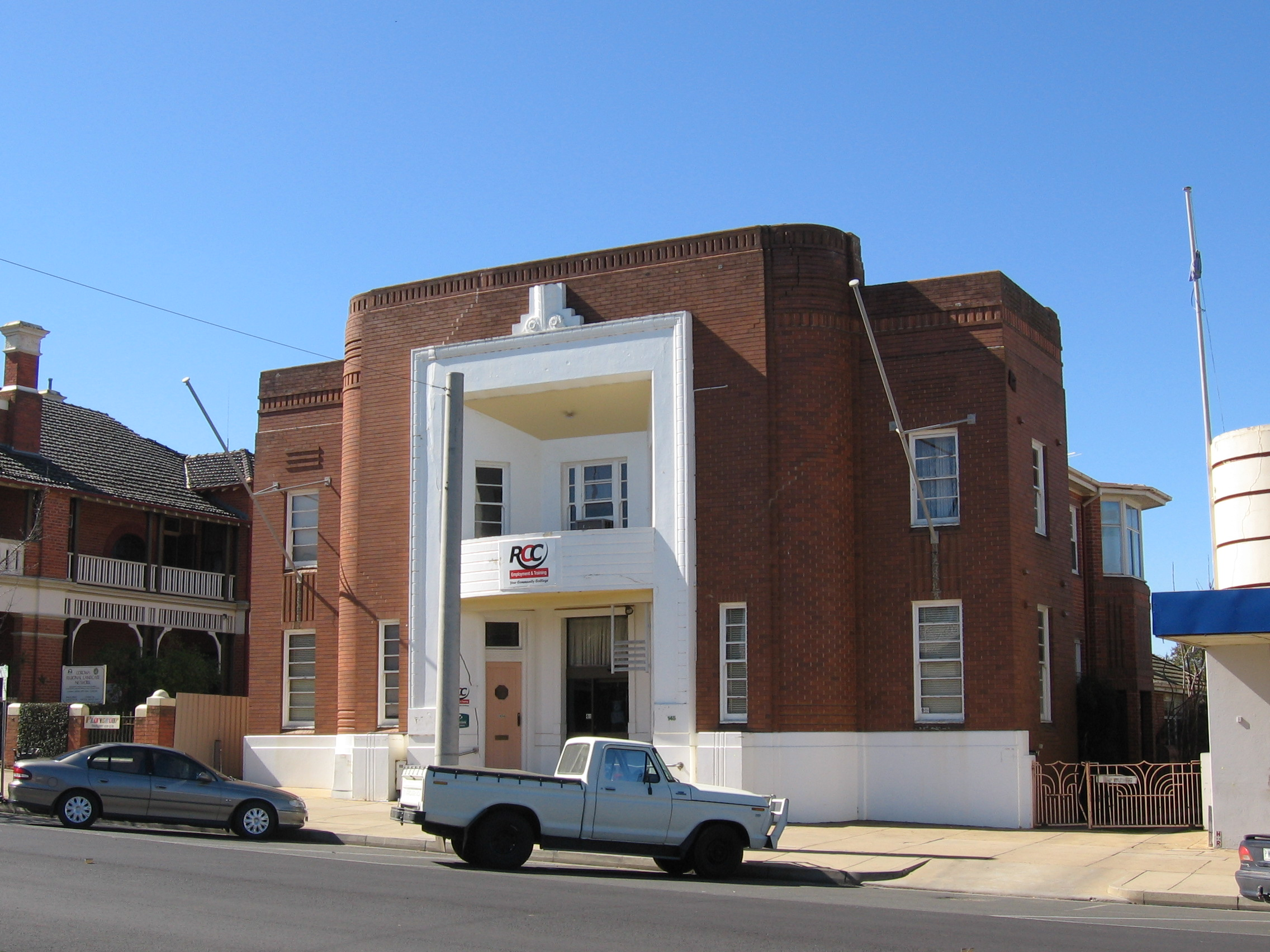
Corowa, New South Wales Branch

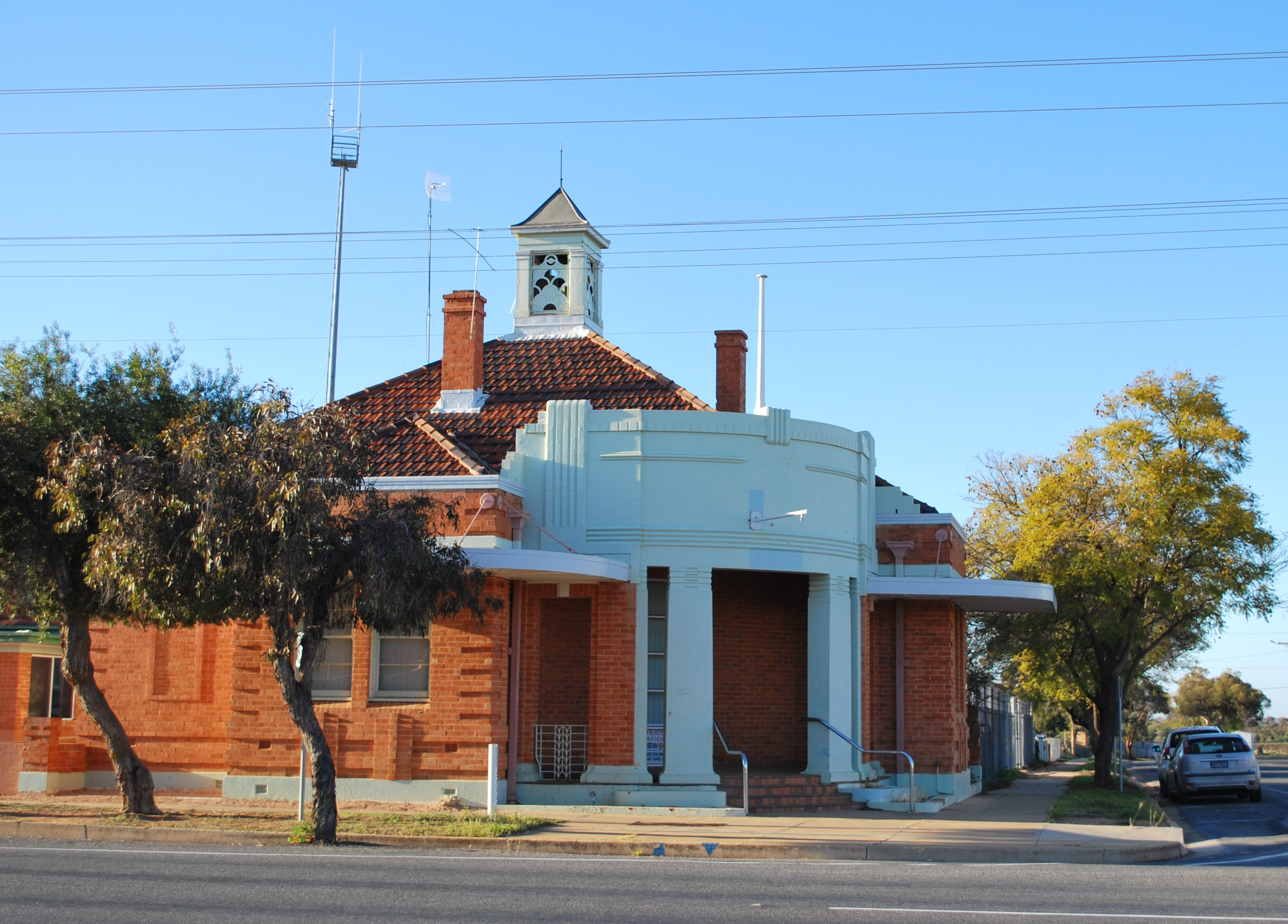
Dareton, New South Wales Branch

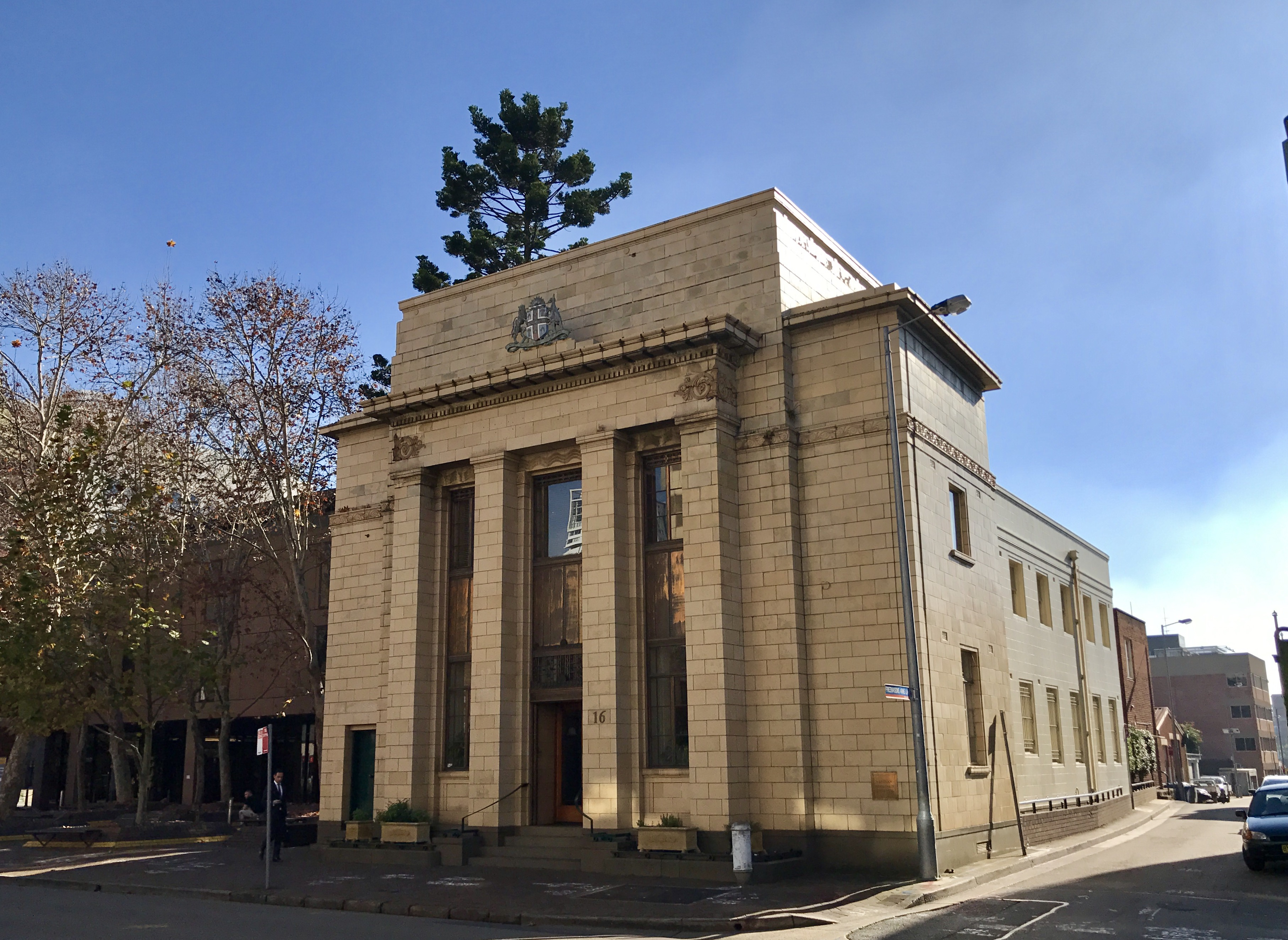
Parramatta Branch

There are many former buildings of the Rural Bank and its successors that are heritage listed:

- 253, 257 Auburn Street, Goulburn (Goulburn Mulwaree LEP).
- 16-22 Kurrajong Avenue, Leeton (1935; Leeton LEP).
- Corner Macquarie Street and Memorial Avenue, Liverpool (Liverpool LEP).
- 1 Wharf Street, Murwillumbah (Tweed LEP).
- 92-94 Hyde Street, Bellingen (Bellingen LEP).
- 32 Blackwall Road, Woy Woy (Central Coast LEP).
- 16 George Street, Parramatta (1938; Parramatta LEP).
- 107 Otho Street, Inverell (Inverell LEP).
- 217-223 Cressy Street, Deniliquin (1935; Edward River LEP).
- 94-100 Summerland Way, Kyogle (Kyogle LEP).
- 150 Mann Street, Gosford (1934; Central Coast LEP).
- 98 Pacific Highway, Wyong (Central Coast LEP).
- 45 Bridge Street, Muswellbrook (1935 archaeology remains; Muswellbrook LEP).
- 2 Station Street, Quirindi (1908/1932; Liverpool Plains LEP).
- Cnr Railway and Kooyoo Streets, Griffith (Griffith LEP).
- 113 Barker Street, Casino (1935; Richmond Valley LEP).
- 274 Parker Street, Cootamundra (Cootamundra–Gundagai LEP).
- 145-149 Sanger Street, Corowa (1936; Federation LEP).
- 44-46 Tapio Avenue, Dareton (Wentworth LEP).
- 110 Main Street, West Wyalong (Bland LEP).
- 642 Dean Street, Albury (1937; Albury LEP).
- 140 Victoria Street, Taree (1935; Mid-Coast LEP).
- 70 Yapunyah Street, Barellan (Narrandera LEP).
- 62 Market Street, Mudgee (1926; Mid-Western Regional LEP).
- 245 Grey Street, Glen Innes (1935; Glen Innes Severn LEP).
- 159 Hoskins Street, Temora (1934; Temora LEP).
- 65 Dandaloo Street, Narromine (1939; Narromine LEP).
- 147 Comur Street, Yass (1886/1935; Yass Valley LEP).
- 192 High Street, Hillston (1935/1939; Carrathool LEP).
