= Rural Bank Building, Martin Place =

Coordinates: 33.8674°S 151.2110°E

Rural Bank Building
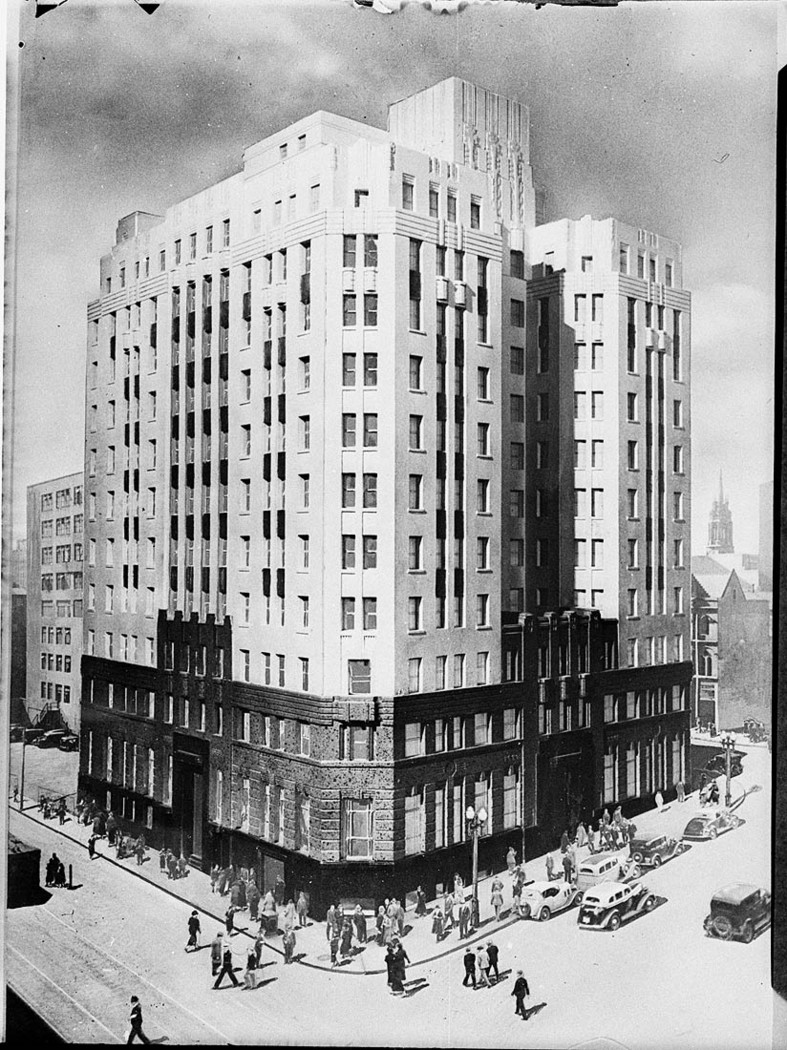
- Original sketch of the building, prepared by Russell Roberts Studios (1934).

General information
- Type: Commercial office building
- Architectural style: Inter-War Art Deco
- Location: 52 Martin Place, Sydney, New South Wales, Australia
- Construction started: 20 August 1934 (Excavation); 19 December 1935 (Foundation)
- Completed: 15 December 1936
- Demolished: January 1983

Height
- Roof: 45.72 m (150.0 ft)

Technical details
- Floor count: 12

Design and construction
- Architect: Frank Turner
- Architecture firm: Rural Bank of New South Wales
- Developer: Rural Bank of New South Wales
- Main contractor: A Bradshaw Limited (Foundations); Hutcherson Bros (Main Works)

Register of the National Estate
- Official name: Rural Bank of New South Wales; Former Rural Bank
- Designated: 18 August 1982
- Delisted: 11 August 1987
- Part of: Martin Place – GPO Precinct

The Rural Bank Building was a landmark bank and commercial building on a block bounded by Martin Place, Elizabeth Street and Phillip Street in the Sydney central business district, Australia. Completed in 1936 and designed in the Inter-war Art Deco style by the bank's chief architect, Frank William Turner, the building served as the Rural Bank's main headquarters until 1982. Despite its distinctive design receiving recognition for its heritage value as "one of the finest art deco buildings in Australia", including from the Australian Institute of Architects and through a listing on the Federal Register of the National Estate, the Rural Bank Building was controversially demolished in 1983 and replaced by the postmodern State Bank Centre development by Peddle Thorp & Walker, prompting greater community efforts to protect the heritage of Sydney.

== Design and construction ==
The development of a headquarters building for the newly created (since 1 July 1933) Rural Bank of New South Wales in Martin Place was connected to the development of Martin Place itself. With the City of Sydney's extension of Martin Place to Macquarie Street due to be completed on 8 April 1936, a series of development sites along each side of the new thoroughfare had been put up for sale. The first two sites sold were those between Elizabeth Street and Phillip Street, with two lots comprising the northern site being sold on 12 April 1934 to the Rural Bank for £77,734. The southern block was purchased by the Australian Provincial Assurance Company on 23 May 1935, for £83,000, for its new headquarters.

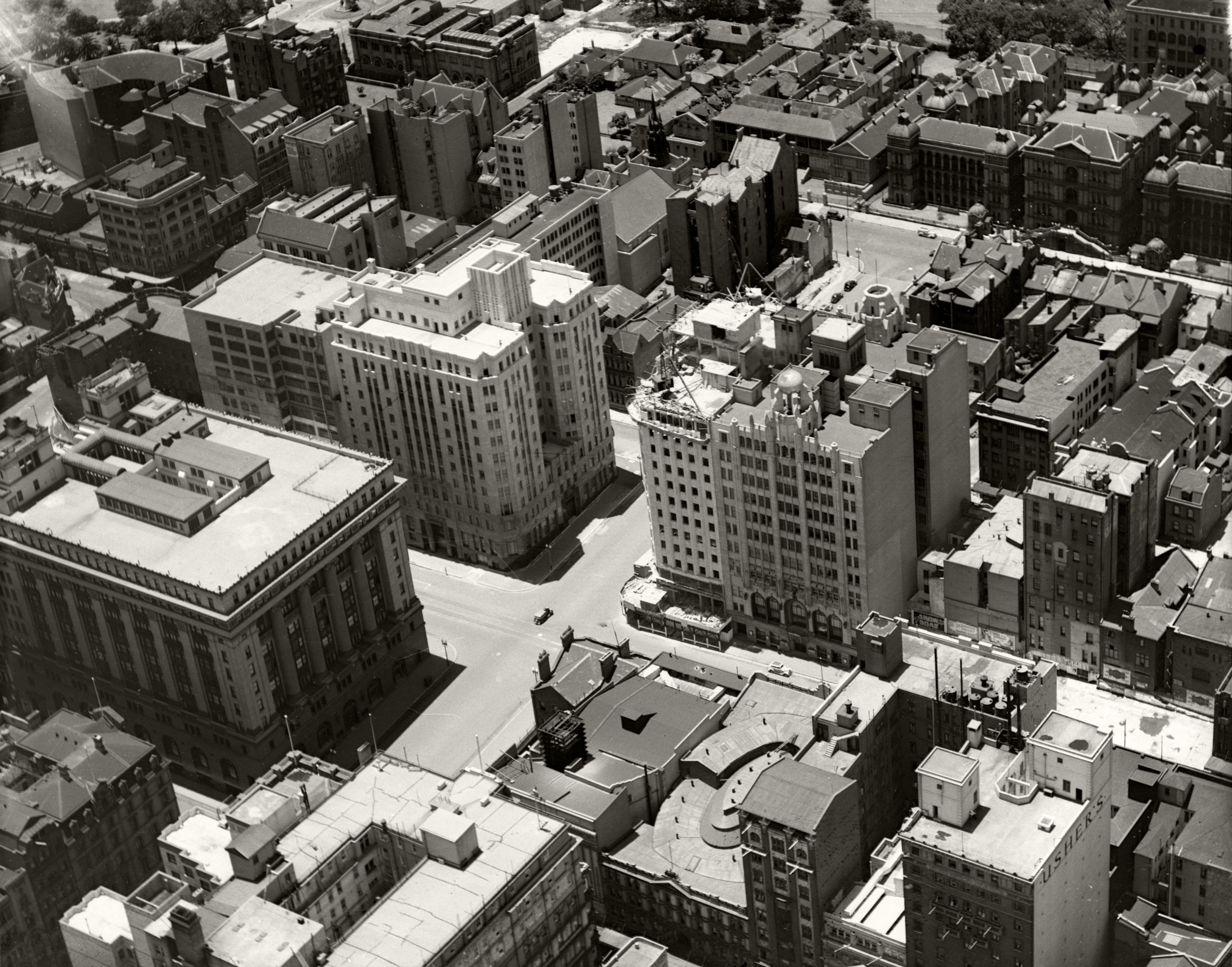
Aerial view of Martin Place from December 1936, showing the newly completed Rural Bank

The Rural Bank's chief architect, Frank Turner, was commissioned to design the new building, with excavation of the site and foundation works commencing on 20 August 1934 by A Bradshaw Limited. Turner's design for a restrained Art Deco style tower with a height of 150 feet to meet the height limit for the City of Sydney set under the Height of Buildings Act, 1912. The construction contract for £179,816 was awarded in April 1935 to master builders Hutcherson Brothers, and was noted for including among the first uses in Sydney of a combined use of structural steel and reinforced concrete beams. The two foundation stones on either side of the Martin Place entrance were laid in an official ceremony on 19 December 1935 by the Premier of New South Wales, Bertram Stevens, and the bank president, Clarence McKerihan. The building was officially completed on 15 December 1936.

On its completion, the architectural journal Decoration and Glass, noted:

Appropriately situated in a commanding position in Sydney's most important and central street, the Rural Bank's new head office towers skywards for the maximum height prescribed by the city's building regulations. It is a significant inclusion to Sydney's ever-changing skyline. Architecturally, the building embodies the best principles of modern design, relying for its effect on beauty of line and proportion rather than overmuch ornamental embellishment — a dignified building for a dignified and honourable purpose.

The bank commissioned various decorations and artworks for the new headquarters, symbolising the business of the bank. Several ram's head plaques, carved in granite, were installed on the façade that were "symbolic of the importance of Wool in the growth and prosperity of the country, and of the part played by the Rural Bank since its origin in 1899, in financing both the Wool industry and all other industries associated with primary production." In November 1938, two mural paintings depicting the wool and wheat industries by Norman Carter were installed in the banking chamber.

=== Sub-contractors and suppliers ===
The building was noted for having a high proportion of Australian materials used during construction, with less than 1% of materials being imported.

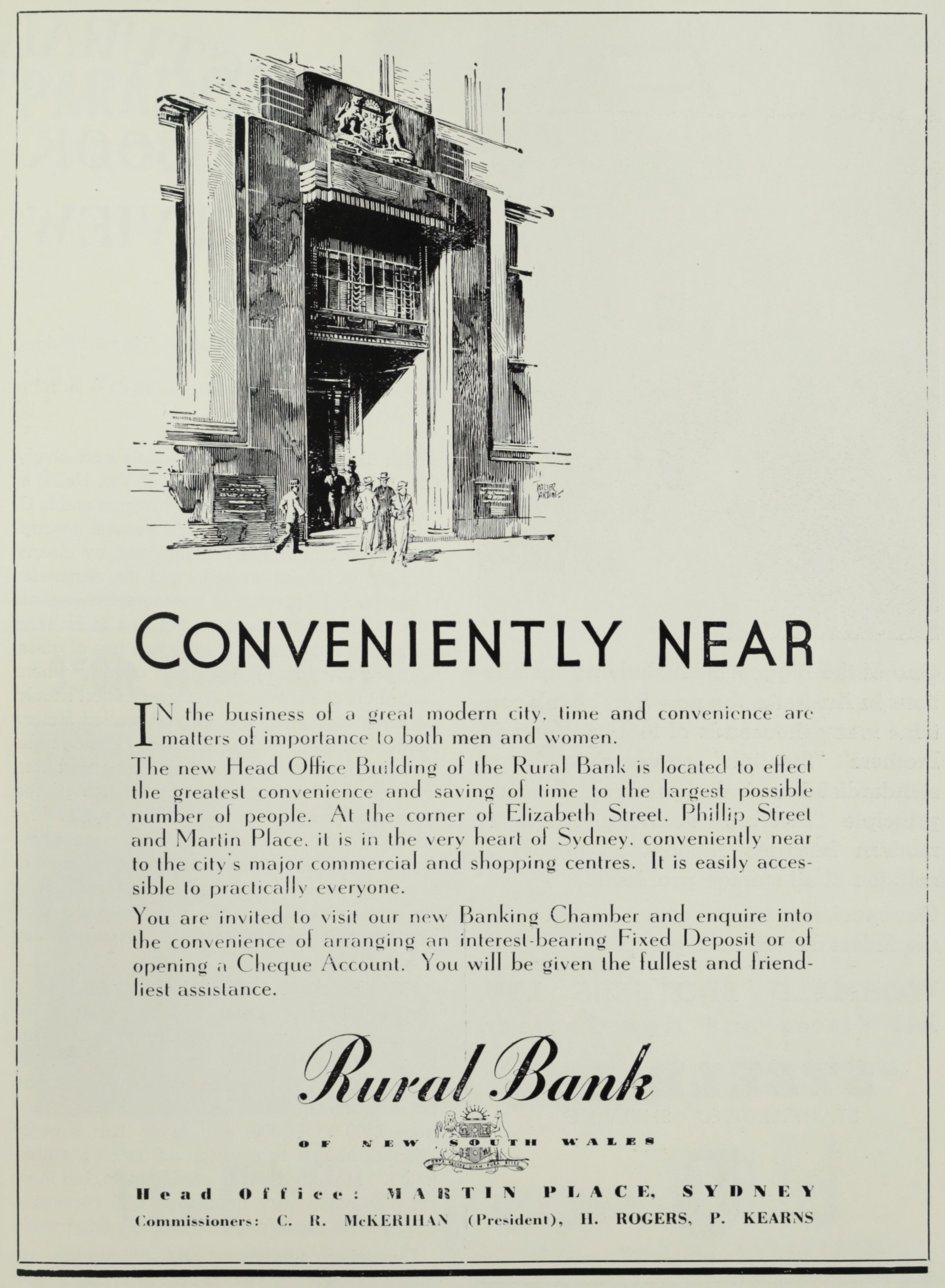
1937 Rural Bank advertisement promoting the newly opened Martin Place head office

- Timber panelling: Beale & Co. (Boardroom, commissioners), Standardised Veneer and Panel Co.
- Marble and Terrazzo: Melocco Brothers.
- Terrazzo window sills: Terrazzo & Co.
- Electrical installation and fire alarm system: F. T. S. O'Donnell Griffen & Co. Ltd.
- Strong rooms, safes and lift doors, etc.: Chubbs (Aust.) Co. Ltd.
- Tiles: Australian Tesselated Tile Company.
- Air conditioning, kitchen equipment, fire doors, exhaust ducts, etc.: Malley's Ltd.
- Hot water and heating systems: J. Sainsbury & Co.
- Filing cabinets and fireproof doors: Wormald Bros.
- Smith's electric clocks and light fittings: Lawrence & Hanson.
- Metal basement ceilings, Bronze Spandrels, Glazed Screen to 2nd Floor: Wunderlich Ltd.
- Timber veneer doors: Frederick Rose.
- Marble in vestibule walls: Gamble & Dreelin.
- Glazing: J. C. Goodwin.
- Steel windows and balustrading: Sydney Ore Steel Co. Ltd.
- Fibrous plaster ceilings: G. R. Lumb & Sons.
- Lifts and cars: Waygood Otis.
- Cistern valves: John Danks & Son.
- Sanitary fittings: R. Fowler Ltd. (Fowler Ware) for Tylor's Ltd.
- Sanitary ware: Smith & Keelar.
- Lower exterior granite fascia: Loveridge and Hudson.
- Upper exterior composite fascia: Composite Stones Ltd.
- Hardware: Leonard Smythe.
- Water strainers: J. Wildridge & Sinclair.
- Wood-core fire-proof doors: Austral Roller Shutters.
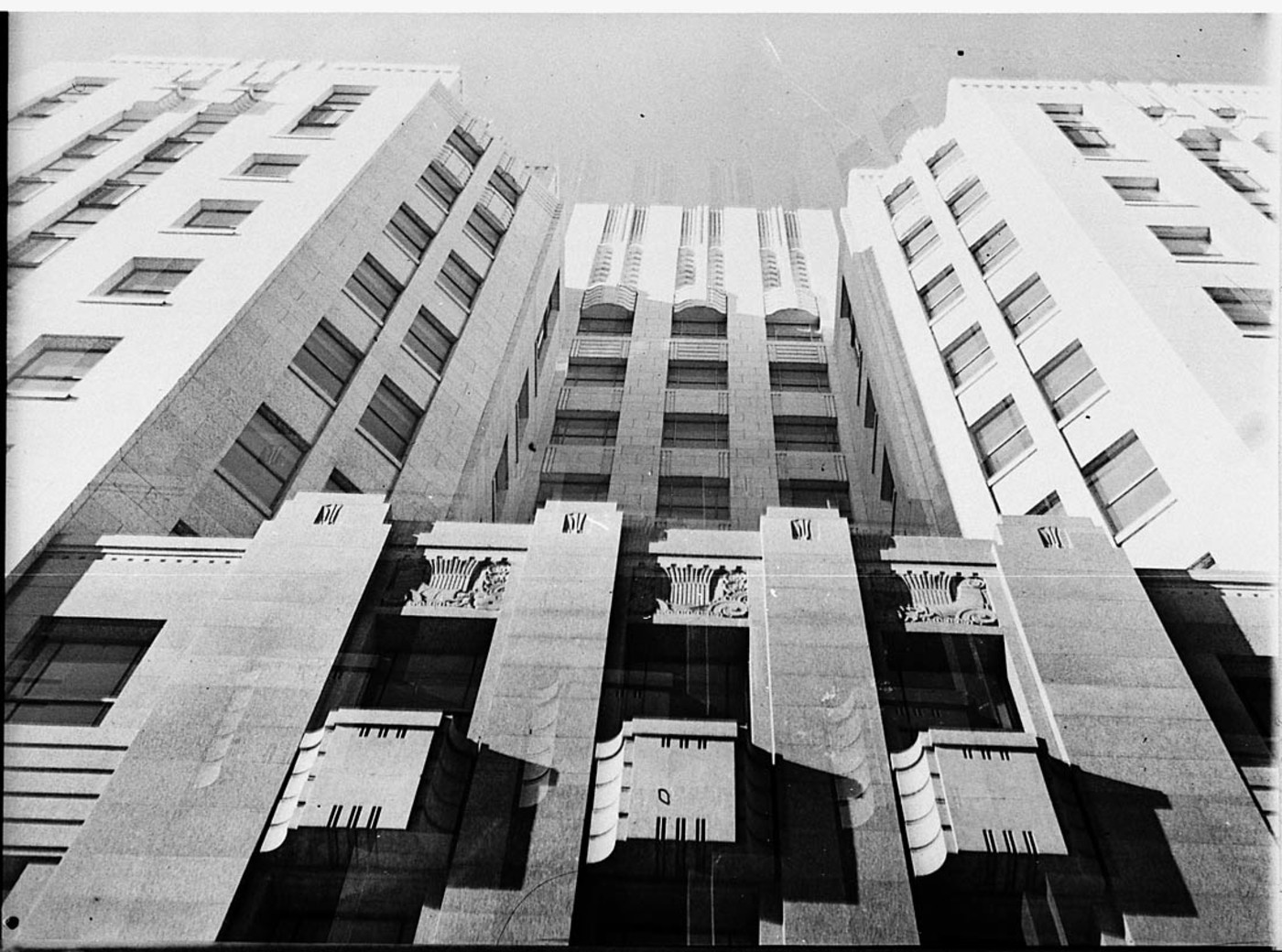
Upper section of the Martin Place facade, 1936

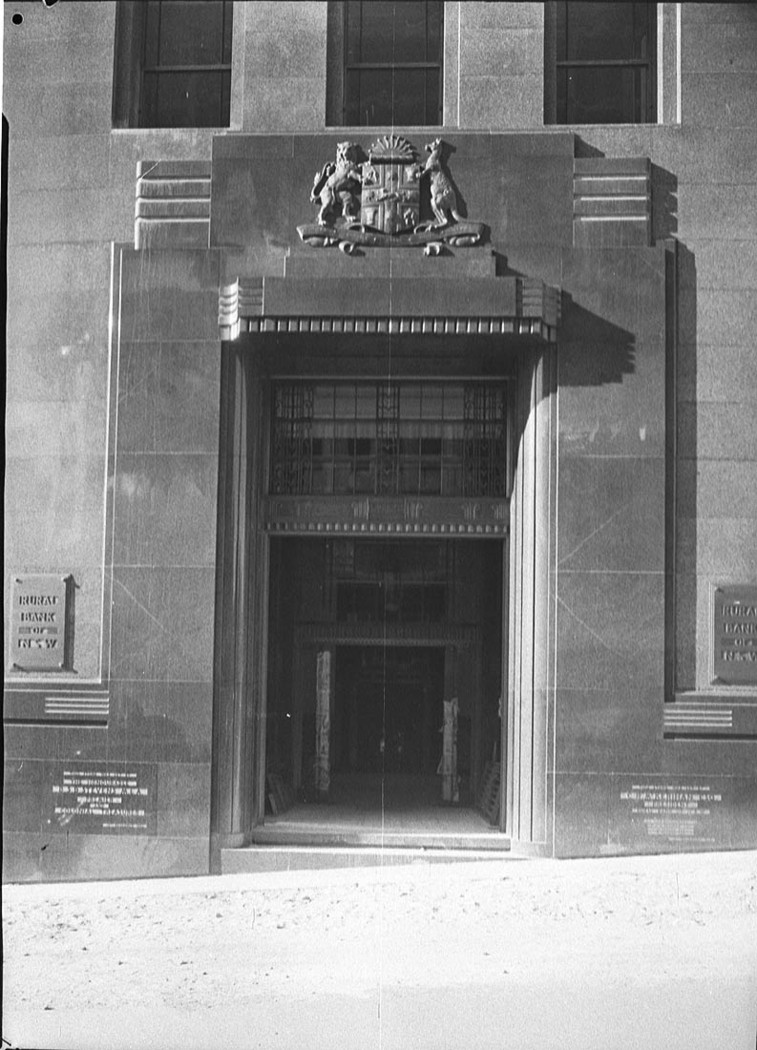
Martin Place entrance, with the foundation stones on either side, 1936

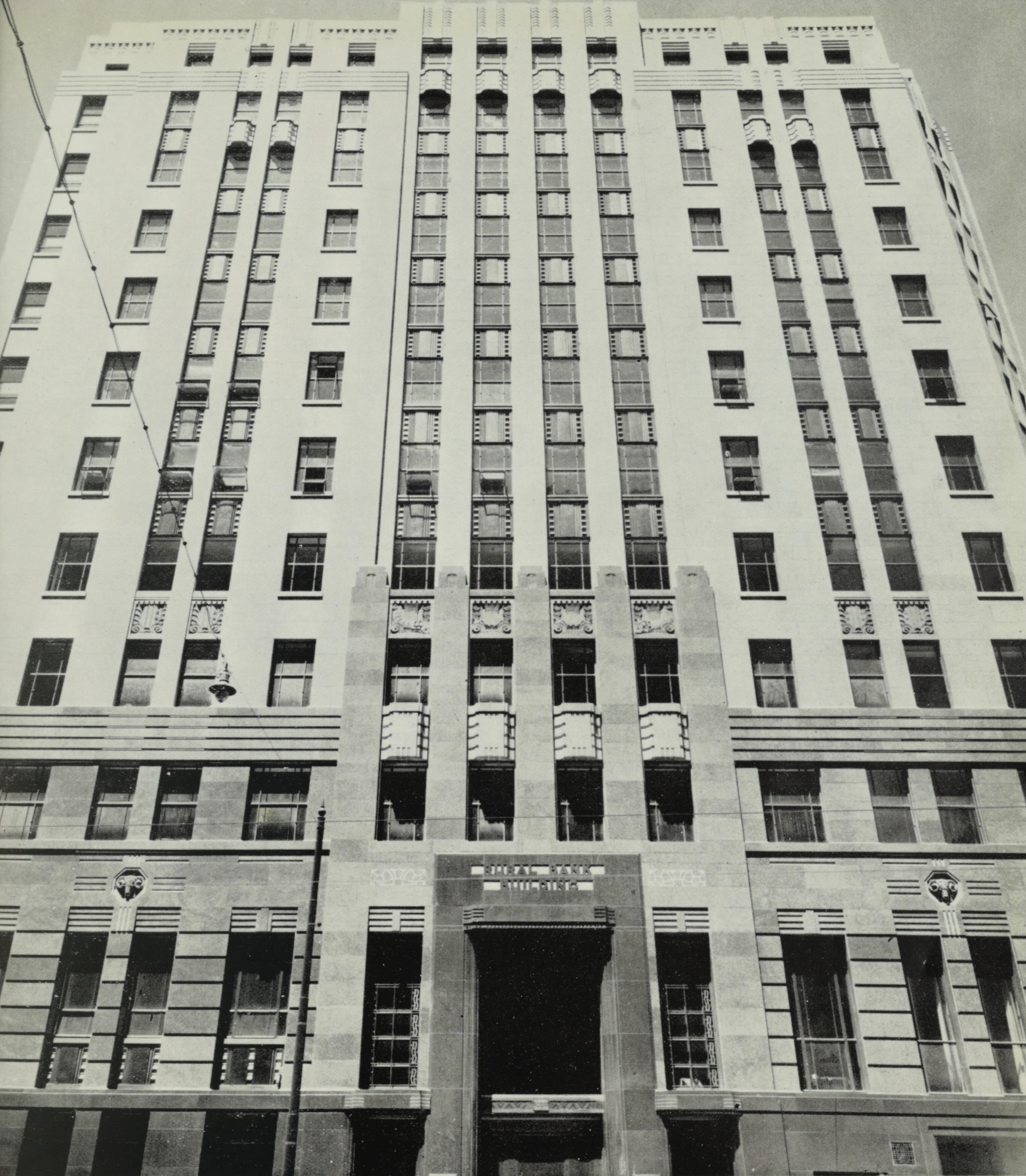
Elizabeth Street facade, 1937

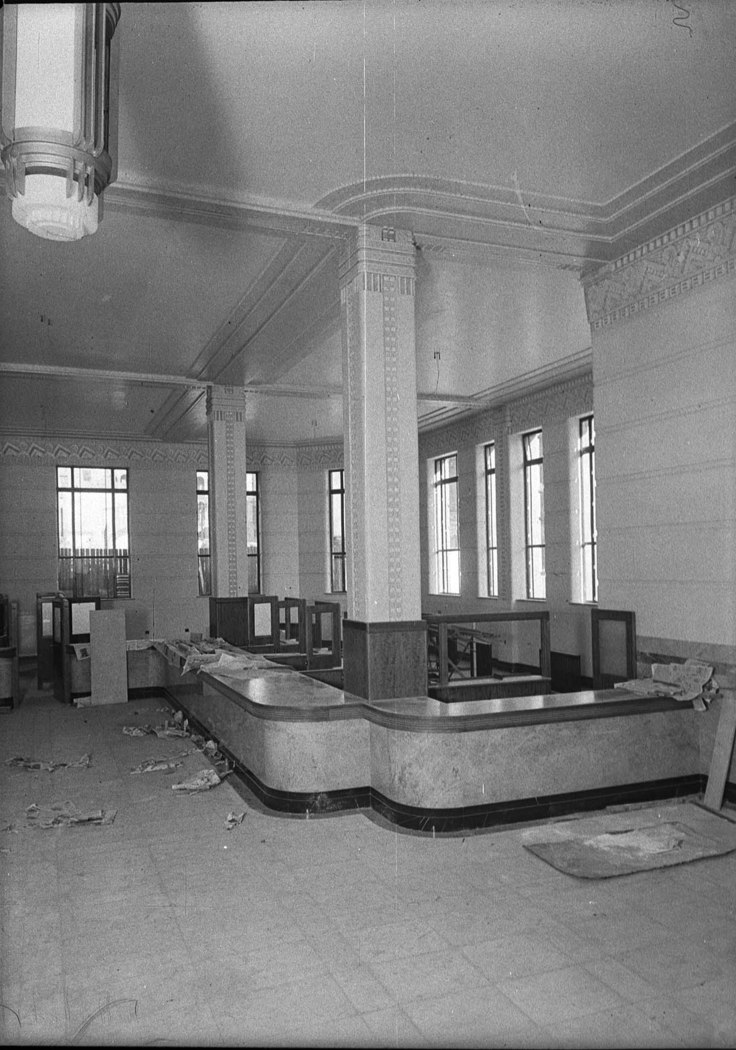
Main banking chamber, 1936

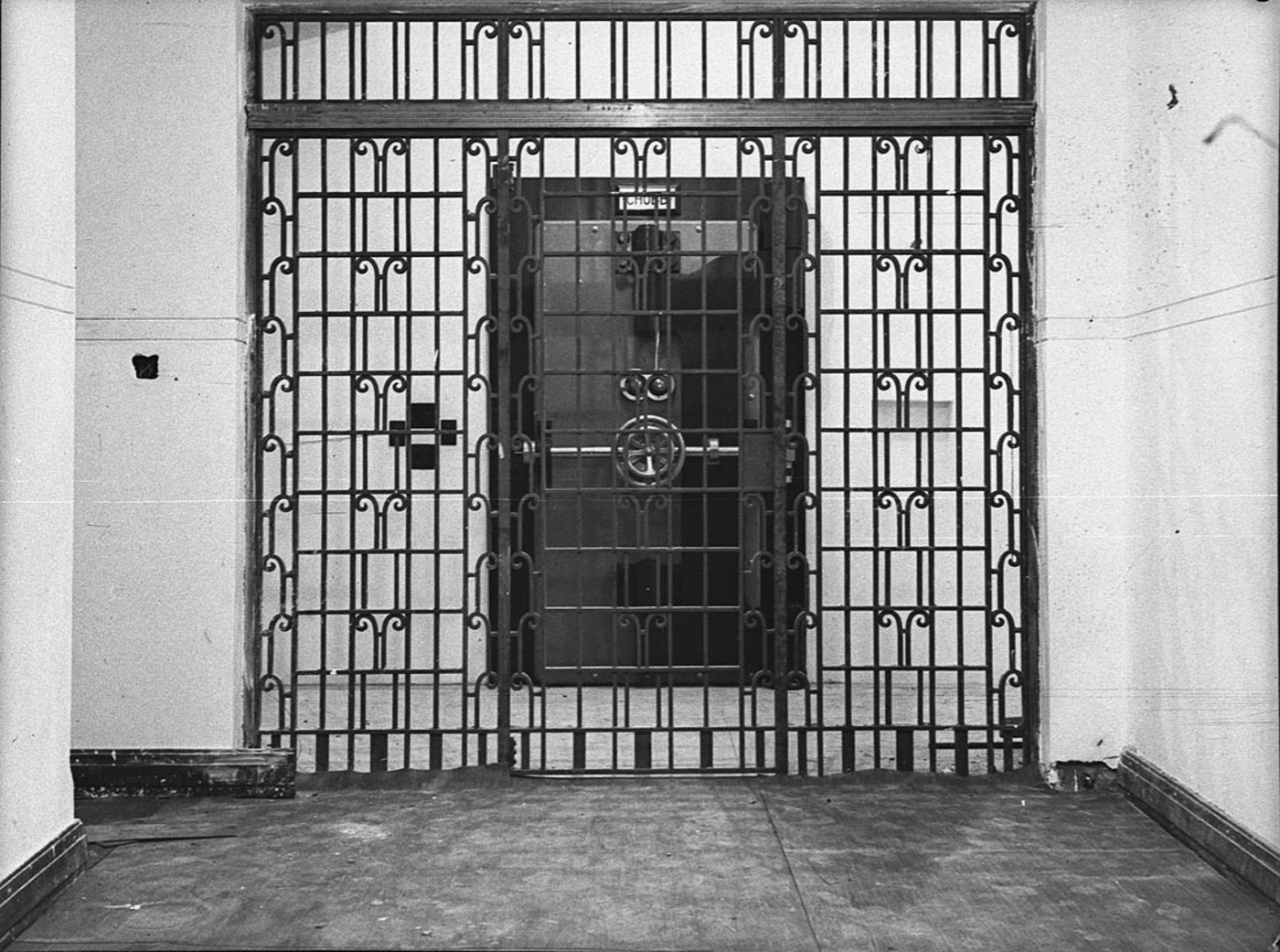
Sliding grille at the entrance to the vault, 1936

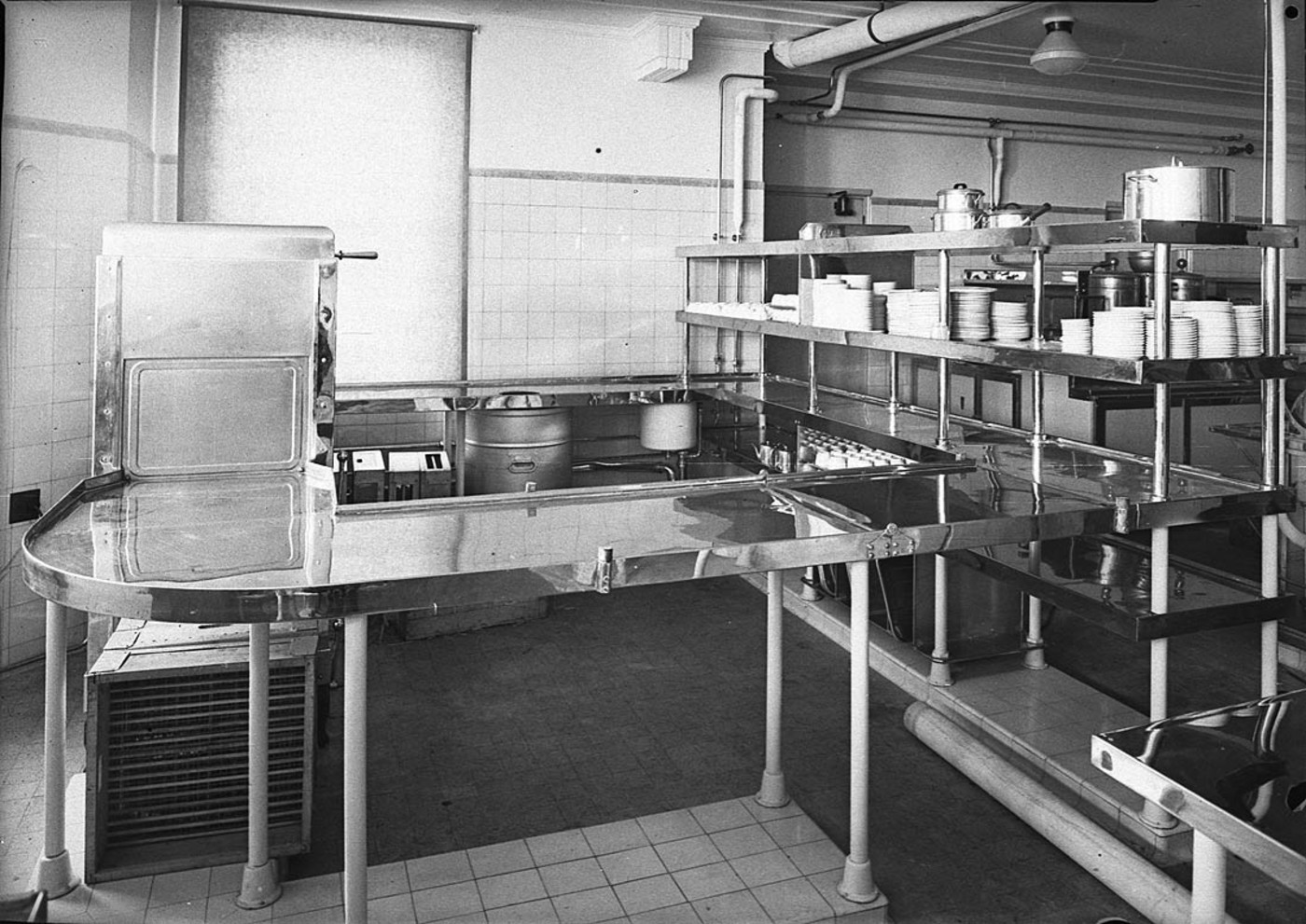
Stainless steel cafe kitchens, 1936

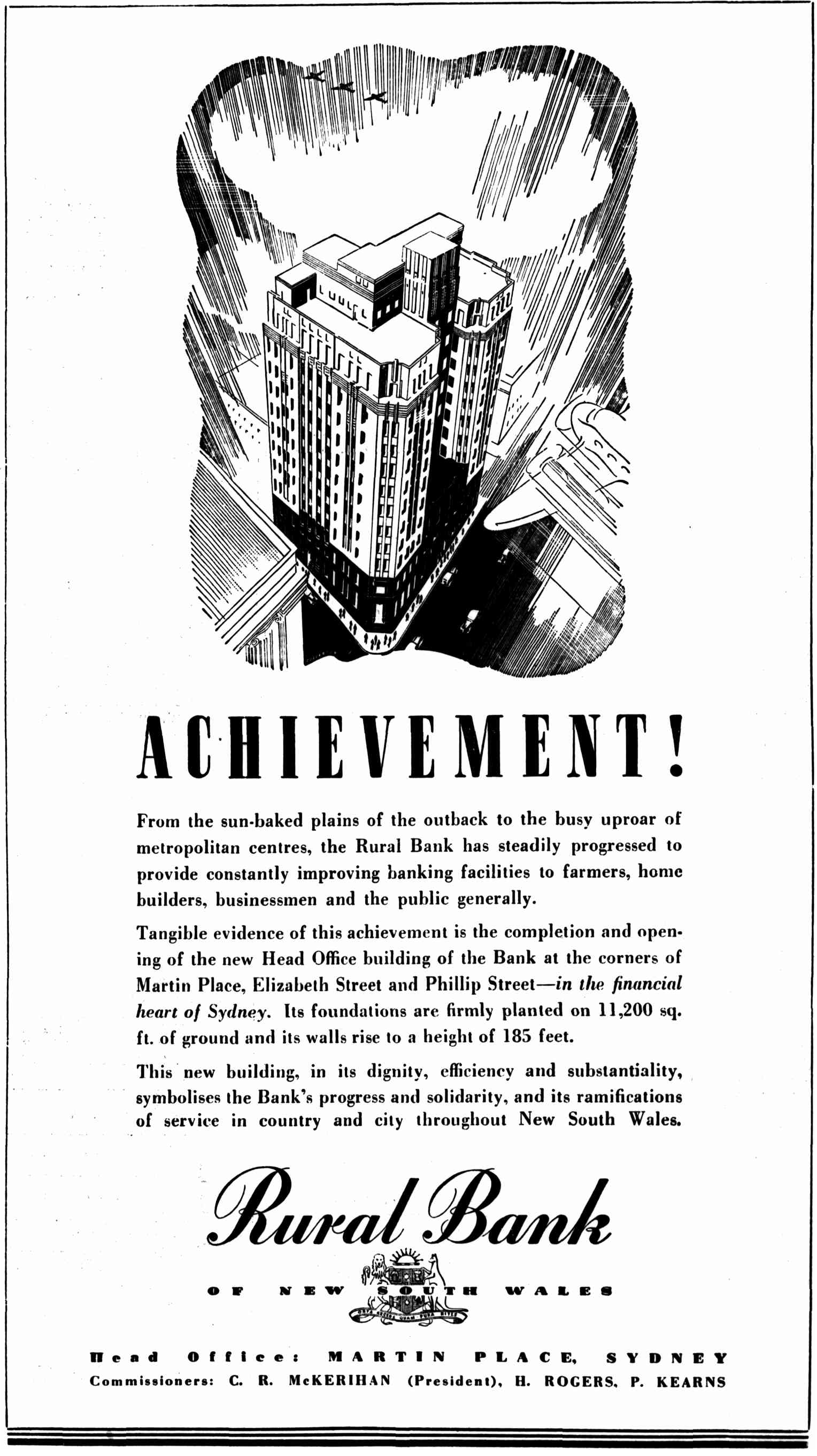
December 1936 advertisement

== Demolition ==
On 9 June 1981, to mark the reconstitution of the bank as the State Bank of New South Wales from 1982, the bank's management sought to replace the existing building with a new structure for $28.5 million. The building would be replaced by a post-modern style office tower to house both the State Bank and TAA, to a design by Peddle Thorp & Walker. This sparked significant opposition from community groups, including the Royal Australian Institute of Architects and the National Trust of Australia, who initiated a public campaign to retain the Art Deco bank building. In April 1981, the Heritage Council of NSW had recommended that the Rural Bank receive state heritage protection, but controversially rescinded its decision at its August 1981 meeting following representations from the State Bank's architects. On 25 March 1982, a public protest was held on Martin Place to oppose the demolition attended by over 300 people, and the National Trust published a full-page advertisement in The Sydney Morning Herald signed by 93 high-profile citizens declaring that "Demolition would be an act of corporate vandalism that would do little for the image of an institution which declares an interest in serving the people of this state." The architect, Mayor of North Sydney, and Member for North Shore, Ted Mack, gave a speech to the protest that day, exclaiming:

Make no mistake, there is no planning, architectural, functional or economic reason why this building should be demolished–it is quite the reverse. If it is demolished it will be because of the anti-social attitudes of a few individuals who occupy positions of power.

The designer of the bank's replacement tower, Graham Marriott Thorp, expressed to the City of Sydney's building committee that the preservation of the building's façade would be a "dangerous and expensive venture", that the Institute of Architects did not represent all architects, and that "the Art Deco period was not a great period of architecture .. the fad of preserving Art Deco buildings would pass as quickly as the Art Deco period itself ... The building is not worthy preservation, being ugly, no longer fulfilling its useful purpose, and having a limited life to its façade." In stark contrast, heritage architect Ian Stapleton expressed his view that the Rural Bank was "one of the finest art deco buildings in Australia."

In March 1982, in the face of the advocacy from the Institute of Architects, National Trust, and a 4,809-signature petition opposing demolition, the City of Sydney's building committee initially rejected the application and recommended that the Rural Bank Building be protected for its heritage value. In April 1982, eminent architecture academic and architecture critic for The Sydney Morning Herald, Professor John Haskell, opined on the merits of the replacement design:

Like an upturned letter T, that tall office tower sits between the banking halls fronting Martin Place and the back bustle containing the TAA Terminal. Whereas the front is over-inflated, trying hard to make five storeys the equivalent of 11 on the Commonwealth Savings Bank, the rear is blank and forbidding; the tower sits uncomfortably between both, its vertical ribs of windows like a sick pastiche of art deco. The scheme lacks a design concept binding the three parts together, the scale adopted is aggressive and many of the details look clumsy and unsympathetic. If it is built, Martin Place will assuredly be less pleasant and certainly less sunny, Sydney will have lost an irreplaceable asset that European cities would have prized – and who will be the winner? Not the man-in-the-street, for sure, but the bank that claims to do more for him personally.

The council had to consider the demolition application more than six times before it was approved by the council by 14–9 in May 1982. In response, Alderman Jeremy Bingham, the leader of the Civic Reform Association opposition to the right-wing Labor majority council led by Doug Sutherland, accused the Labor aldermen who supported demolition of obeying the NSW State Labor Government of Neville Wran and selling out the heritage of Sydney, while Independent Alderman Clover Moore declared that Sutherland would become known as "the Judas of Martin Place" for his role in the bank's destruction. In August 1982, the bank building was placed on the Register of the National Estate, a listing which came too late and did not prevent the demolition hoardings from going up in September 1982. The granite Ram's head plaques from the façade were salvaged and reused on the State Bank Centre façade, as a reminder of the former bank building.

With the building demolished by January 1983, the Australian Heritage Commission moved to delist the site from the Register of the National Estate, which was effected on 11 August 1987. The loss of the Rural Bank created significant interest in the preservation of Sydney's Art Deco buildings, and led to a greater appreciation and interest in saving these buildings from demolition, as well as an appreciated need to protect the scale and heritage of the Martin Place Precinct. In 1985, when the State Bank Centre was nearing completion, the new Minister for Planning and Environment, Bob Carr, took action under the Heritage Act 1977 to preserve the "Martin Place Precinct", including placing conservation orders on the APA Building, MLC Building, Challis House, the GIO Building, and the Bank of NSW Building.

In 1988, the Royal Australian Historical Society installed a Green Plaque (No. 100) on the State Bank Centre's Martin Place façade, with the plaque reading: "State Bank Centre – The State Bank traces its origins through four previous banks to the first savings bank in Australia (1819). It has occupied this site since 1936, first as the Rural Bank and in its present form since 1981."
