= Gough Whitlam's birthplace =

House in Melbourne, Australia

Coordinates: 37°48′45″S 145°03′14″E

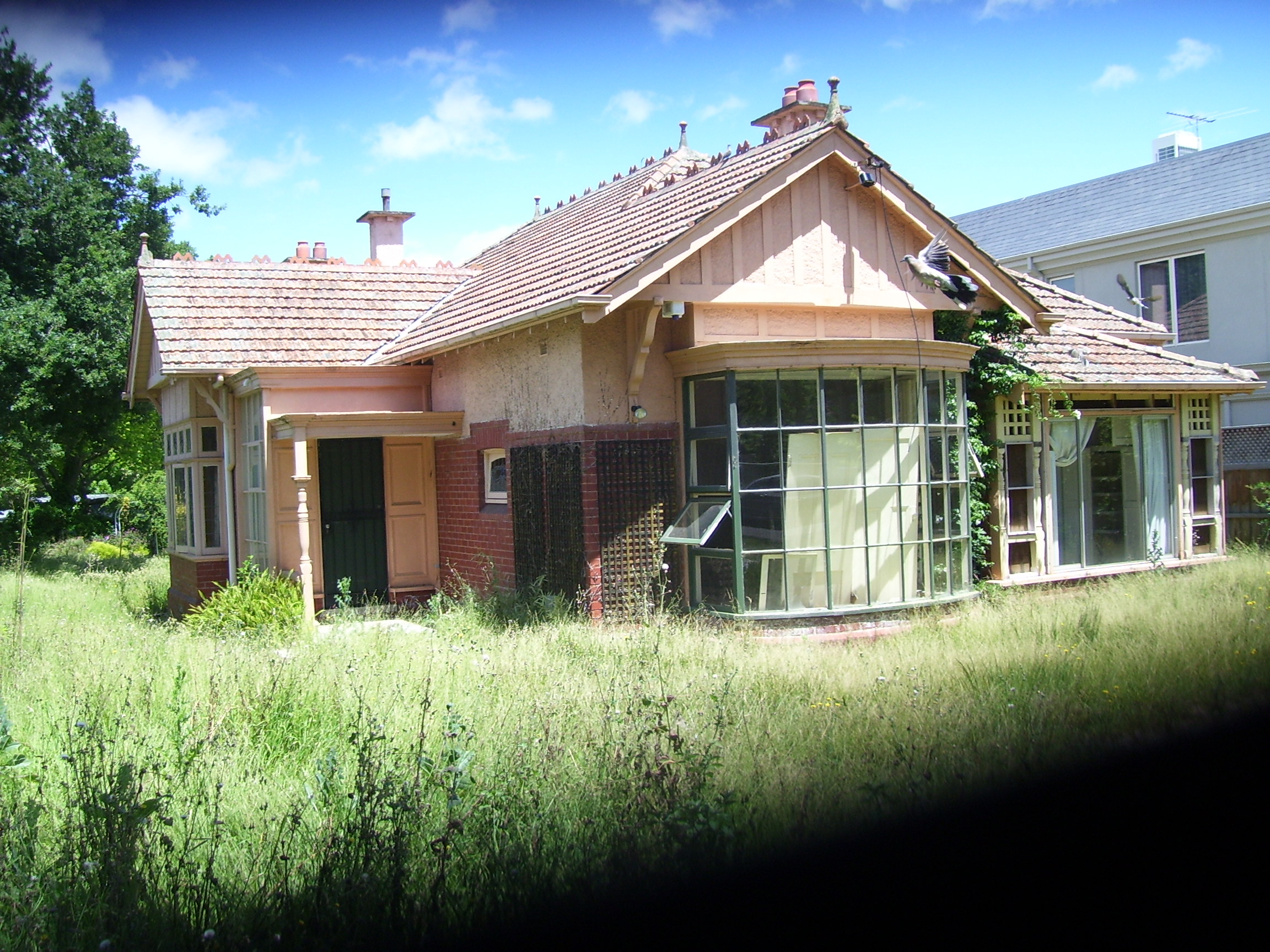
'Ngara', 46 Rowland Street, Kew, Victoria, Gough Whitlam's birthplace

Ngara was the birthplace of the 21st prime minister of Australia, Gough Whitlam. It was located at 46 Rowland Street, Kew, a suburb of Melbourne, Victoria. "Ngara" means "to listen, hear and think" in the Darug language of the Darug or Iyora (Eora) Aboriginal people in the Sydney area.

== Construction ==
Harry Frederick ("Fred") Whitlam and Martha ("Mattie") Whitlam née Maddocks, were married on 10 September 1914 and on 18 December 1914, bought a block of land in Rowland Street Kew with a mortgage from the State Savings Bank of Victoria (under the Credit Foncier programme) signed off on 30 January 1915. Mattie's father, Edward, who was a Master Builder by profession, built, and probably designed the house for the new couple. Plans were prepared by February 1915, and construction completed by May 1915. Ngara was a brick Edwardian villa with Marseille pattern terracotta tile roof and timber finishes. It was partly demolished in mid 2014, with joinery, fireplaces and floors dismantled, but the components were left on site.

== Whitlam's birth ==
The Whitlams moved into the house around May 1915 and Edward Gough Whitlam was born on 11 July 1916, on the kitchen table according to family legend. Presumably Gough would have been conceived in the front bedroom of the house sometime around early October 1915. Fred and Mattie therefore were in the house no more than 5 months before their attempts to produce offspring were successful. He was the older of two children; he had a younger sister, Freda.

Fred Whitlam was working at this time in the Commonwealth Crown Solicitor's Office, in the Attorney General's Department, headed by Robert Garran. In 1917, Fred Whitlam was promoted to senior Clerk in Sydney, and so on 25 October 1917, Ngara was sold. The new owners were Samuel James Woods, a tailor and mercer, and Mabel Lucy Woods who obtained co-operative finance through the Starr-Bowkett Building Society. They only paid off their mortgage in 1932.

== Later moves ==
The Whitlams subsequently made their homes in Sydney and Canberra, but there were occasional links back to the family house at Kew. Biographies refer to the family's holidays in Melbourne and visits to relatives in Kew, and Gough walking with his uncle to his grandparents' house, while another claims the Labor party inquired about holding an event at the house for Gough's 90th birthday, but then owner Mrs Swinnerton, a staunch Liberal supporter, declined saying: "We couldn't have all those Labor people here." Mrs Swinnerton, who owned the house in the later 20th century, is said to have "ensured everyone in the street, young and old, were aware of the home being the birthplace of Gough Whitlam".

== Campaign to stop demolition ==
The house was not initially identified in local heritage studies, and so a demolition permit was issued by Boroondara Council. Demolition had begun when a public campaign stopped the demolition and led to an interim preservation order placed on the site by the Victorian Heritage Council. Victorian Planning Minister Matthew Guy initially said he could not stop the demolition as a permit had been issued, However, he then changed his mind, and requested the Victorian Heritage Council to place an interim preservation order on the place. Following a public hearing, Heritage Victoria determined that the house was not of sufficient importance to place on the Victorian Heritage Register and so be given permanent protection.

The City of Boroondara separately applied an interim Heritage Overlay on the site, however a subsequent planning panel also determined that the house was not of sufficient significance to warrant preservation.

The Boroondara Council, however, rejected the planning panel recommendation at their council meeting of 16 November 2015, and voted to retain the house in a heritage overlay, and therefore protect it.

On 3 May 2016 the Victorian Minister for the Environment overruled the heritage overlay, and on Friday 13 May 2016, the house was bulldozed.

== Ngara Institute ==
The Ngara Institute was established in early 2014, taking its name from the name of Whitlam's birthplace.
