= Bill Dovey =

Australian judge

Bill Dovey QC

Judge of the Supreme Court of New South Wales
- In office 30 March 1953 – 9 April 1964

Personal details
- Born: 10 April 1894 Bathurst, New South Wales, Australia
- Died: 12 December 1969 (aged 75) Darlinghurst, New South Wales, Australia
- Spouse: Mary Duncan (m. 1914)
- Children: William Dovey (son); Margaret Whitlam (daughter)
- Relatives: Gough Whitlam (son-in-law); Tony Whitlam (grandson); Nicholas Whitlam (grandson)
- Education: University of Sydney

Wilfred Robert Dovey QC (10 April 1894 – 12 December 1969) was an Australian barrister and judge. He served on the Supreme Court of New South Wales from 1953 to 1964. He was described as colourful, slightly eccentric and irascible, although he had a brilliant legal mind and a Shakespearean vocabulary. His daughter Margaret married the future Prime Minister of Australia Gough Whitlam.

== Biography ==
Dovey was born in Bathurst, New South Wales in 1894. His father Robert Dovey had been an assistant to William Farrer (Dovey's son William Griffith Dovey later married a relative of Farrer's wife, Nina De Salis). His mother Winifred Isabel Agnes Dovey (née Adams), was born in China. He studied at the Sydney Grammar School and the University of Sydney. He served in World War I in New Guinea. He married Mary Dorothy Duncan four days before leaving for Rabaul with the Australian Naval and Military Expeditionary Force in August 1914. After discharge in 1915, he taught at Brisbane Grammar School and studied law at the University of Queensland. He was admitted to the New South Wales Bar in 1922.

Dovey was a keen rugby league player. In 1928 he and some football-playing friends, in post-match liquor-fuelled high spirits, were reputed to have jumped across the then-unfinished spans of the Sydney Harbour Bridge, 134 metres above the water.

Dovey was appointed King's Counsel in 1935. He was an alderman on the Waverley Municipal Council in 1935–36. He was involved in a number of royal commissions and inquiries, such as those on doctors' remuneration for national insurance (1938), the detention of members of the Australia First Movement (1944) and Illegal Activities in the New South Wales Liquor Industry (1951–52); in the latter case he engaged his son-in-law Gough Whitlam as his junior (Whitlam had married Dovey's daughter Margaret in 1942). Dovey represented many criminals in high-profile court cases of the day, including the gangland figure, John Frederick "Chow" Hayes and the notorious Sydney identity, Kate Leigh.

In 1953, Dovey was appointed a judge of the Supreme Court of New South Wales. His cases included an early prosecution of Abe Saffron. He was known for his short temper and he did not shrink from sharp criticisms in his judgements. Because of his personality in this regard, he gained the nickname "Hanging Judge Dovey", which was a reflection upon his numerous harsh sentences and abrasive manner with those in the court room. In turn, he was often publicly criticised himself. For his conduct in the Royal Commission on the activities of the NSW Police, he was censured by the New South Wales Bar Association for lacking tolerance and judicial calm and exhibiting "a great disservice to the bench and the legal profession"; he was also criticised by the Incorporated Law Institute for "departing from accepted standards of courtesy, fairness and patience". John Douglas Pringle, editor of The Sydney Morning Herald, condemned "the mean and shabby courtroom ... where the judge failed to preserve that august and aloof detachment which is his function and participated in the inquiry as though he was counsel engaged for an interested party".

Dovey was a racehorse owner and was frequently seen at racecourses wearing his trademark top hat and a monocle. One of his top hats is now on display at the Powerhouse Museum in Sydney. He was criticised by NSW state politicians for continuing on the committee of the Australian Jockey Club after his elevation to the bench, and in 1960 he was criticised for allegedly attending to AJC business to the neglect of his judicial duties. He was vice-chairman of the AJC 1953–61. When on the country court circuit, he was also rumoured to schedule early morning hearings so that he could attend race meetings in the afternoon.

Dovey retired from the bench in 1964, and died on 12 December 1969 at the St Vincent's Hospital, Sydney. His son William Griffith Dovey QC became a judge of the Family Court of Australia, and his daughter Margaret married Gough Whitlam, later to become Prime Minister of Australia 1972–75. His wife died in 1978. His name is commemorated in Dovey Place in the Canberra suburb of Latham.

== Sources ==
- About NSW
