= William Griffith Dovey =

Australian judge

Judge on the Family Court of Australia
- In office 1976–1989

Personal details
- Born: 1924
- Died: 1990 (aged 65–66)
- Spouse: Susan Fane De Salis
- Parent: Bill Dovey (father)
- Relatives: Margaret Whitlam (sister)

William Griffith 'Bill' Dovey (1924 – 1990) was a judge of the Family Court of Australia from 1976 to 1989. Alongside his extensive career specializing as a Sydney barrister and later as a judge in family law, he was a member of the Royal Australian Naval Volunteer Reserve.

He was the son of Supreme Court of New South Wales judge Bill Dovey. His sister Margaret married the future Prime Minister of Australia, Gough Whitlam.

Dovey married Susan Fane De Salis, great granddaughter of pastoralist and politician Leopold De Salis. They had two daughters.

== Sources ==
- Bill Dovey
- Mitchell, Susan (21 October 2014). Margaret & Gough: The Love Story That Shaped a Nation. Hachette Australia. ISBN 9780733632594.
- Broun, Malcolm D. (1996). "Dovey, Wilfred Robert (Bill) (1894–1969)". Australian Dictionary of Biography. 14. MUP.
