= Freda Whitlam =

Australian educator, feminist (1920–2018)

Freda Whitlam AM
- Born: 11 September 1920; Mosman, New South Wales, Australia
- Died: 30 May 2018 (aged 97); Penrith, New South Wales, Australia
- Education: Canberra University College; University of Melbourne; Yale University; University of London
- Occupations: Educator; feminist
- Title: Principal Presbyterian Ladies' College, Sydney; Moderator New South Wales Synod Uniting Church in Australia
- Father: Fred Whitlam
- Relatives: Gough Whitlam (brother)

Freda Leslie Whitlam AM (11 September 1920 – 30 May 2018), was an Australian educator and feminist. Whitlam was a leader in the Uniting Church. She is best known for her work as the principal of the Presbyterian Ladies' College (PLC), at Croydon in inner-west Sydney, where she worked for 18 years.

== Biography ==
Whitlam was born in Mosman on 11 September 1920 and was the sister of Gough Whitlam who became Prime Minister of Australia. In 1927, she and her family moved to Canberra. Her father Fred Whitlam became Australian Crown Solicitor in December 1936. Whitlam attended Canberra Girls Grammar School and Abbotsleigh before studying at Canberra University College. During World War II, she served with the WAAAF, joining in 1943. After the war, she earned a Bachelor of Arts from Melbourne University. Whitlam went on to teach French in Canberra and learned Latin and Esperanto. In 1954, she earned a Fulbright Scholarship to study at Yale. She earned her master's degree there in 1955 and then went on to take further studies at London University.

Whitlam became the new principal of the Presbyterian Ladies' College, Croydon (PLC) starting in 1958. Whitlam resigned from the school in 1976, citing political issues between herself and the school's council as the reason for her early retirement.

In 1977, a Union of the Congregational, Methodist and Presbyterian churches took place, forming the Uniting Church in Australia. Approximately one-third of the Presbyterian Church decided to remain Presbyterian, and consequently the property of the church had to be divided. In May of that year it was announced that PLC Croydon was to remain Presbyterian and PLC Pymble would be transferred, with its name changed to Pymble Ladies' College. Then in 1978 it was decided that PLC Croydon should return to its original name: Presbyterian Ladies' College, Sydney. Freda Whitlam took part in the movement to form the Uniting Church and thus ended her principalship of the school. She was appointed moderator of the New South Wales Synod of the Uniting Church in Australia in 1985 and served in that role until 1986. In 1986, she told The Sydney Morning Herald that she identifies as a feminist. Whitlam was made a Member of the Order of Australia (AM) in the 1987 Australia Day Honours for "service to education and to the community". She was involved in drug reform in 1993, where she signed onto a charter to abolish criminal sanctions for personal illegal drug use.

In 1999, Whitlam was awarded an honorary doctorate of letters from the University of Western Sydney. PLC named their school of science after her in 1998. She continued to teach Latin well into her nineties. Whitlam died in a nursing home in Penrith on 30 May 2018.
