= The Truth of the Matter =

1979 memoir by Gough Whitlam

- Author: Gough Whitlam
- Language: English
- Genre: Memoir
- Publisher: Melbourne University Publishing
- Publication date: 1979
- Publication place: Australia
- Pages: 320
- ISBN: 0140700994

The Truth of the Matter is a 1979 political memoir by Gough Whitlam the 21st prime minister of Australia. The memoir examines the controversial dismissal of his government by Governor-General Sir John Kerr, a constitutional crisis that remains one of the most significant events in Australian political history. Whitlam stated that the book is in part, a reply to Kerr's book about the dismissal, Matters for Judgment, which was published a year prior in 1978.

== Background ==
Gough Whitlam served as the 21st Prime Minister of Australia from December 1972 to November 1975, leading the Australian Labor Party (ALP) to victory after 23 years of rule by the conservative Liberal/Country Coalition. Whitlam's government pursued a broad reform agenda, implementing changes in areas such as healthcare, through the establishment of Medibank, Australia’s first universal health insurance scheme; education, by abolishing university tuition fees and increasing funding for schools; and foreign policy, such as by recognizing the People’s Republic of China. It also advanced Indigenous land rights through introducing legislation such as the Aboriginal Land Rights (Northern Territory) Act 1976. These initiatives were accompanied by economic difficulties, including rising inflation and unemployment, political disputes over spending priorities, and frequent legislative deadlocks with the opposition-controlled Senate, which blocked key bills such as supply bills in 1975, precipitating the constitutional crisis.

After the election of 1972, Labor and the coalition each had secured 26 out of the 60 seats in the Senate, while the Democratic Labor Party (DLP) held 5 seats and the remaining 3 were held by independents. As the DLP usually sided with the Coalition, 93 bills had been rejected by the Senate over the course of the 3 year Whitlam government.

Whitlam's tenure in office proved highly turbulent and controversial, and in October 1975, the Opposition under Malcolm Fraser used its control of the Senate to defer passage of appropriation bills needed to finance government expenditure which had already been passed by the House of Representatives. Fraser and the Opposition stated that they would continue to block supply in the Senate unless Whitlam called a fresh election for the House of Representatives, and urged Governor-General Sir John Kerr, who had been appointed governor-general on Whitlam's advice in July 1974, to dismiss Whitlam unless he acceded to their demand. Whitlam believed that Kerr would not dismiss him as prime minister, and Kerr did nothing to make Whitlam believe that he might be dismissed.

On 11 November 1975, the crisis came to a head as Whitlam went to seek Kerr's approval to call a half-Senate election in an attempt to break the parliamentary deadlock. Kerr did not accept Whitlam's request, and instead dismissed him as prime minister and appointed Fraser as caretaker prime minister on the understanding that he would immediately call a general election. Acting quickly before all ALP parliamentarians became aware of the change of government, Fraser and his parliamentary allies were able to secure passage of the supply bills through the Senate and advised Kerr to dissolve Parliament for a double dissolution election. Fraser and his Liberal-Country Coalition were elected with a massive majority in the federal election held the following month.

== Summary ==
The book begins with Whitlam explaining the Senate's role in the dismissal. Whitlam describes what he calls the "Barwick Doctrine", the idea that a government must have the confidence of both houses of the Australian Parliament in order to secure supply of parliament, a principle supported by then Chief Justice Sir Garfield Barwick. Whitlam dismisses this doctrine as simply a description of the current political crisis rather than an interpretation of the Australian Constitution. He recounts the Senates continuous blocking of bills throughout his term in office, and analyses the Senate's contribution to his downfall.

Whitlam then goes on to explain why he nominated Kerr as Governor-General in 1974. Although then Governor-General Sir Paul Hasluck had drafted a list which considered names such as Frank Crean, Kim Beazley Sr., David Derham, Kenneth Wheare, Vincent Fairfax, Kenneth Myer, and H.J. Souter, Whitlam believed that New South Wales Chief-Justice Sir John Kerr "seemed the best qualified and most acceptable to the Australian people" on Hasluck's list, although Whitlam had first approached Myer, who declined due to family and business reasons.

Other topics covered in the book include Kerr's relationship with Rupert Murdoch, the appointments of Cleaver Bunton and Albert Field to the Senate, and the Loans affair.
