= Gough Whitlam =

Prime Minister of Australia from 1972 to 1975

The Honourable Gough Whitlam AC QC
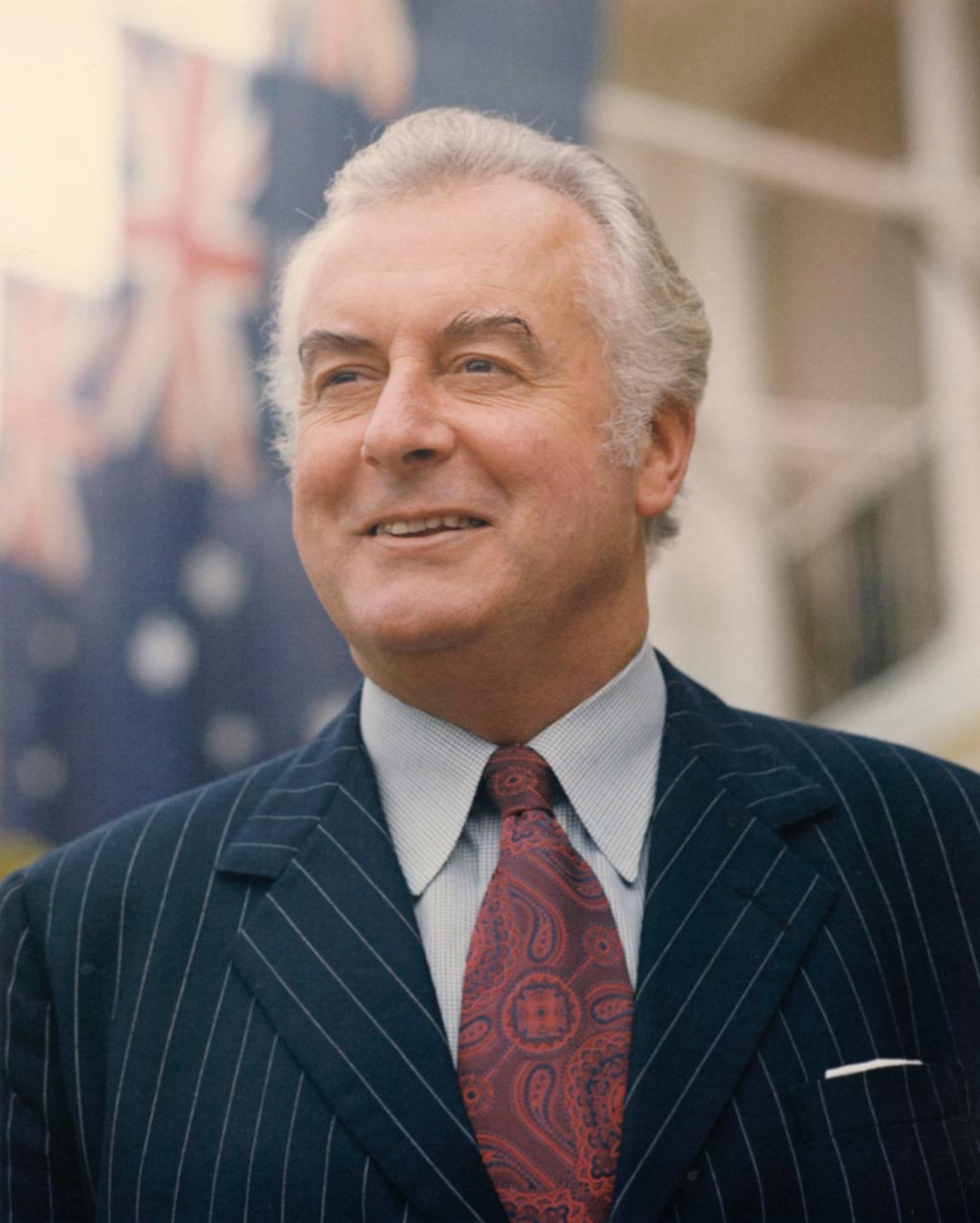
- Official portrait, 1974

21st Prime Minister of Australia
- In office 5 December 1972 – 11 November 1975
- Monarch: Elizabeth II
- Governors-General: Sir Paul Hasluck; Sir John Kerr
- Deputy: Lance Barnard; Jim Cairns; Frank Crean
- Preceded by: William McMahon
- Succeeded by: Malcolm Fraser

Leader of the Opposition
- In office 11 November 1975 – 22 December 1977
- Prime Minister: Malcolm Fraser
- Deputy: Frank Crean; Tom Uren
- Preceded by: Malcolm Fraser
- Succeeded by: Bill Hayden
- In office 8 February 1967 – 5 December 1972
- Prime Minister: Harold Holt; John McEwen; John Gorton; William McMahon
- Deputy: Lance Barnard
- Preceded by: Arthur Calwell
- Succeeded by: Billy Snedden

Minister for Foreign Affairs
- In office 5 December 1972 – 6 November 1973
- Prime Minister: Himself
- Preceded by: Nigel Bowen
- Succeeded by: Don Willesee

Leader of the Labor Party
- In office 8 February 1967 – 22 December 1977
- Deputy: Lance Barnard; Jim Cairns; Frank Crean; Tom Uren
- Preceded by: Arthur Calwell
- Succeeded by: Bill Hayden

Deputy Leader of the Labor Party
- In office 7 March 1960 – 8 February 1967
- Leader: Arthur Calwell
- Preceded by: Arthur Calwell
- Succeeded by: Lance Barnard

Member of the Australian Parliament for Werriwa
- In office 29 November 1952 – 31 July 1978
- Preceded by: Bert Lazzarini
- Succeeded by: John Kerin

Personal details
- Born: Edward Gough Whitlam; 11 July 1916 Kew, Victoria, Australia
- Died: 21 October 2014 (aged 98) Elizabeth Bay, New South Wales, Australia
- Party: Labor
- Height: 6 ft 4 in (194 cm)
- Spouse: Margaret Dovey (m. 1942; died 2012)
- Children: 4, including Tony and Nicholas
- Parents: Fred Whitlam (father); Martha Maddocks (mother)
- Relatives: Freda Whitlam (sister); Bill Dovey (father-in-law); William Dovey (brother-in-law)
- Education: University of Sydney
- Occupation: Barrister; diplomat; politician

Military service
- Branch/service: Royal Australian Air Force
- Years of service: 1941–1945
- Rank: Flight lieutenant
- Unit: No. 13 Squadron
- Battles/wars: World War II
- Gough Whitlam's voice Whitlam speaking at the Dewan Perwakilan Rakyat Republik Indonesia; Recorded 22 February 1973

Edward Gough Whitlam (Note: Pronounced /ˈɡɒf ˈwɪtləm/ GOF WIT-ləm.) (11 July 1916 – 21 October 2014) was the 21st prime minister of Australia, serving from December 1972 to November 1975. To date the longest-serving federal leader of the Australian Labor Party (ALP), he was notable for being the head of a reformist and socially progressive government that ended with his controversial dismissal by the then governor-general of Australia, Sir John Kerr, at the climax of the 1975 constitutional crisis. Whitlam remains the only Australian prime minister to have been removed from office by a governor-general.

Whitlam was an air navigator in the Royal Australian Air Force for four years during World War II, and worked as a barrister following the war. He was first elected to the Australian House of Representatives in 1952, becoming a member of parliament (MP) for the division of Werriwa. Whitlam became deputy leader of the Labor Party in 1960, and in 1967, after the retirement of Arthur Calwell, was elected leader of the party and became the Leader of the Opposition. After narrowly losing the 1969 federal election to John Gorton, Whitlam led Labor to victory at the 1972 election, after 23 years of Coalition government.

In its first term, the Whitlam government introduced numerous socially progressive and reformist policies and initiatives, including the termination of military conscription and the end of Australian involvement in the Vietnam War, institution of universal health care and free university education, and the implementation of legal aid programs. With the opposition-controlled Australian Senate delaying passage of bills, Whitlam called a snap double dissolution election in May 1974, in which he won a slightly reduced majority in the House of Representatives, and picked up three Senate seats to hold equal Senate numbers to the opposition. The Whitlam government then instituted the first and only joint sitting enabled under section 57 of the Australian constitution as part of the double dissolution process. His government's second term was dominated by a declining economy suffering from the 1973 oil crisis and the 1970s global recession, as well as a political scandal known as the Loans affair, which led to the removal of two government ministers. The opposition continued to obstruct Whitlam's agenda in the Senate.

In late 1975, the opposition senators refused to allow a vote on the government's appropriation bills, returning them to the House of Representatives with a demand that the government go to an election. Whitlam argued that his government, which held a clear majority in the House of Representatives, was being held to ransom by the Senate. The crisis ended in mid-November, when governor-general Sir John Kerr dismissed him from office and commissioned the opposition leader, Malcolm Fraser, as caretaker prime minister. Labor lost the subsequent election by a landslide. Whitlam stepped down as leader of the party after losing again at the 1977 election, and retired from parliament the following year. Upon the election of the Hawke government in 1983, he was appointed as ambassador to UNESCO; he was later elected a member of the UNESCO executive board. He remained active into his nineties. The propriety and circumstances of his dismissal and the legacy of his government have been frequently debated in the decades since he left office. Whitlam is often ranked in the upper tier of Australian prime ministers by political experts and academics, with political journalist Paul Kelly writing in 1994 that "there is no doubt that in three years his government was responsible for more reforms and innovations than any other government in Australian history".

== Early life ==
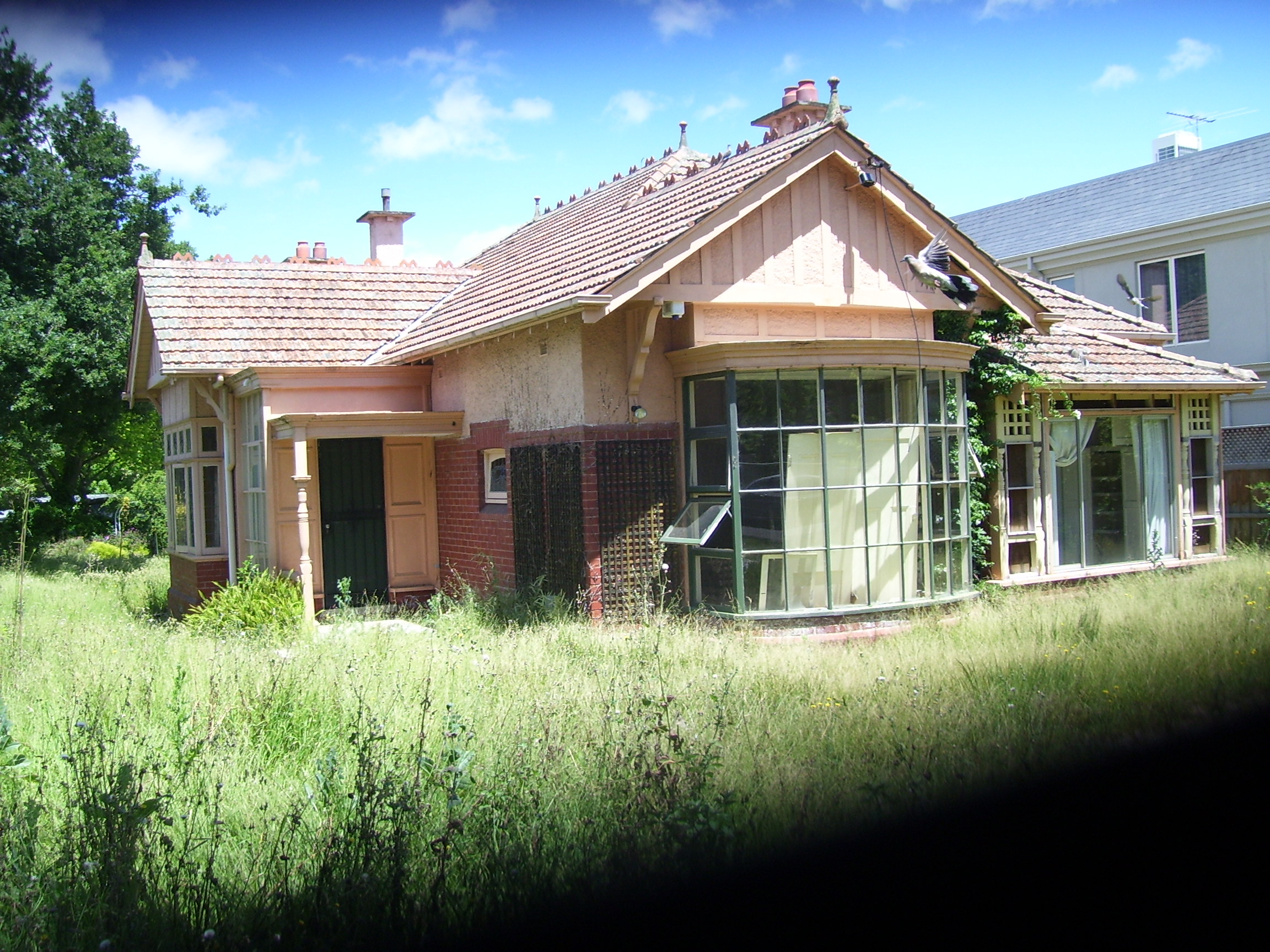
"Ngara", Whitlam's birthplace (now demolished)

Edward Gough Whitlam was born on 11 July 1916 at the family home, "Ngara", at 46 Rowland Street, Kew, a suburb of Melbourne. He was the elder of two children (his sister, Freda, was born four years after him), to Martha (née Maddocks) and Fred Whitlam. His father was a federal public servant who later was Commonwealth Crown Solicitor, and Whitlam senior's involvement in human rights issues was a powerful influence on his son. Since his maternal grandfather was also named Edward, from early childhood he was called by his middle name, "Gough", which had come from his paternal grandfather who had been named after the British soldier Field-Marshal Hugh Gough, 1st Viscount Gough.

In 1918, Fred Whitlam was promoted to deputy Crown solicitor and transferred to Sydney. The family lived first in the North Shore suburb of Mosman and then in Turramurra. At age six, Gough began his education at Chatswood Church of England Girls' School (early primary schooling at a girls' school was not unusual for small boys at the time). After a year there, he attended Mowbray House School and Knox Grammar School in the suburbs of Sydney.

Fred Whitlam was promoted again in 1927, this time to Assistant Crown Solicitor. The position was located in the new national capital of Canberra, and the Whitlam family moved there. As of 2008, Whitlam was the only prime minister to have spent his formative years in Canberra. At the time, conditions remained primitive in what was dubbed "the bush capital" and "the land of the blowflies". Gough attended the government Telopea Park School. In 1932, Whitlam's father transferred him to Canberra Grammar School where, at the Speech Day ceremony that year, he was awarded a prize by the Governor-General, Sir Isaac Isaacs.

Whitlam enrolled at St Paul's College at the University of Sydney at the age of 18. He earned his first wages by appearing, with several other "Paulines", in a cabaret scene in the film The Broken Melody – the students were chosen because St Paul's required formal wear at dinner, and they could therefore supply their own costumes. After receiving a Bachelor of Arts degree with second-class honours in classics, Whitlam remained at St Paul's to study law. He had originally contemplated an academic career, but his lacklustre marks made that unlikely. Dropping out of Greek classes, he professed himself unable to care for the "dry as dust" lectures of Enoch Powell.

== Military service ==
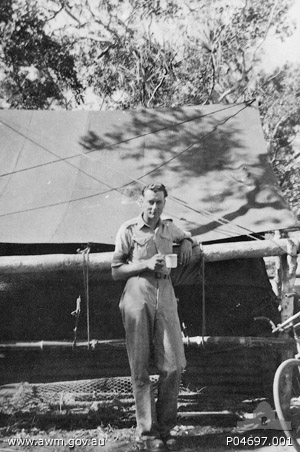
Gough Whitlam in Cooktown, Queensland, in 1944

Soon after the outbreak of World War II in 1939, Whitlam enlisted in the Sydney University Regiment, part of the Militia. In late 1941, following the Japanese attack on Pearl Harbor, and with a year remaining in his legal studies, he volunteered for the Royal Australian Air Force (RAAF). In 1942, while awaiting entry into the service, Whitlam met and married Margaret Elaine Dovey, who had swum for Australia in the 1938 British Empire Games and was the daughter of barrister and future New South Wales Supreme Court judge Bill Dovey. He entered the RAAF on 20 June 1942.

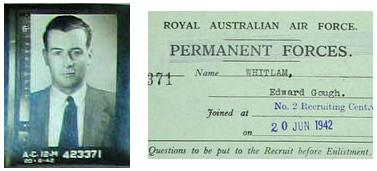
Photograph of Whitlam and attestation paper from his RAAF officer personnel file dated 1942

Whitlam trained as a navigator and bomb aimer, before serving with No. 13 Squadron RAAF, based mainly on the Gove Peninsula, Northern Territory, flying Lockheed Ventura bombers. He reached the rank of Flight Lieutenant. He began his political activities while in the service, distributing literature for the Australian Labor Party during the 1943 federal election and urging the passage of the 1944 "Fourteen Powers" referendum, which would have expanded the powers of the federal government. Although the party was victorious, the referendum it advocated was defeated. In 1961, Whitlam said of the referendum defeat, "My hopes were dashed by the outcome and from that moment I determined to do all I could do to modernise the Australian Constitution." While still in uniform, Whitlam joined the ALP in Sydney in 1945. He was discharged from the RAAF on 17 October 1945, and continued to use Air Force log books to record all the flights he took until 2007. After the war, he obtained his Bachelor of Laws; he was admitted to the federal and New South Wales bars in 1947.

== Early political career, 1952–1967 ==
=== Member of Parliament, 1952–1960 ===
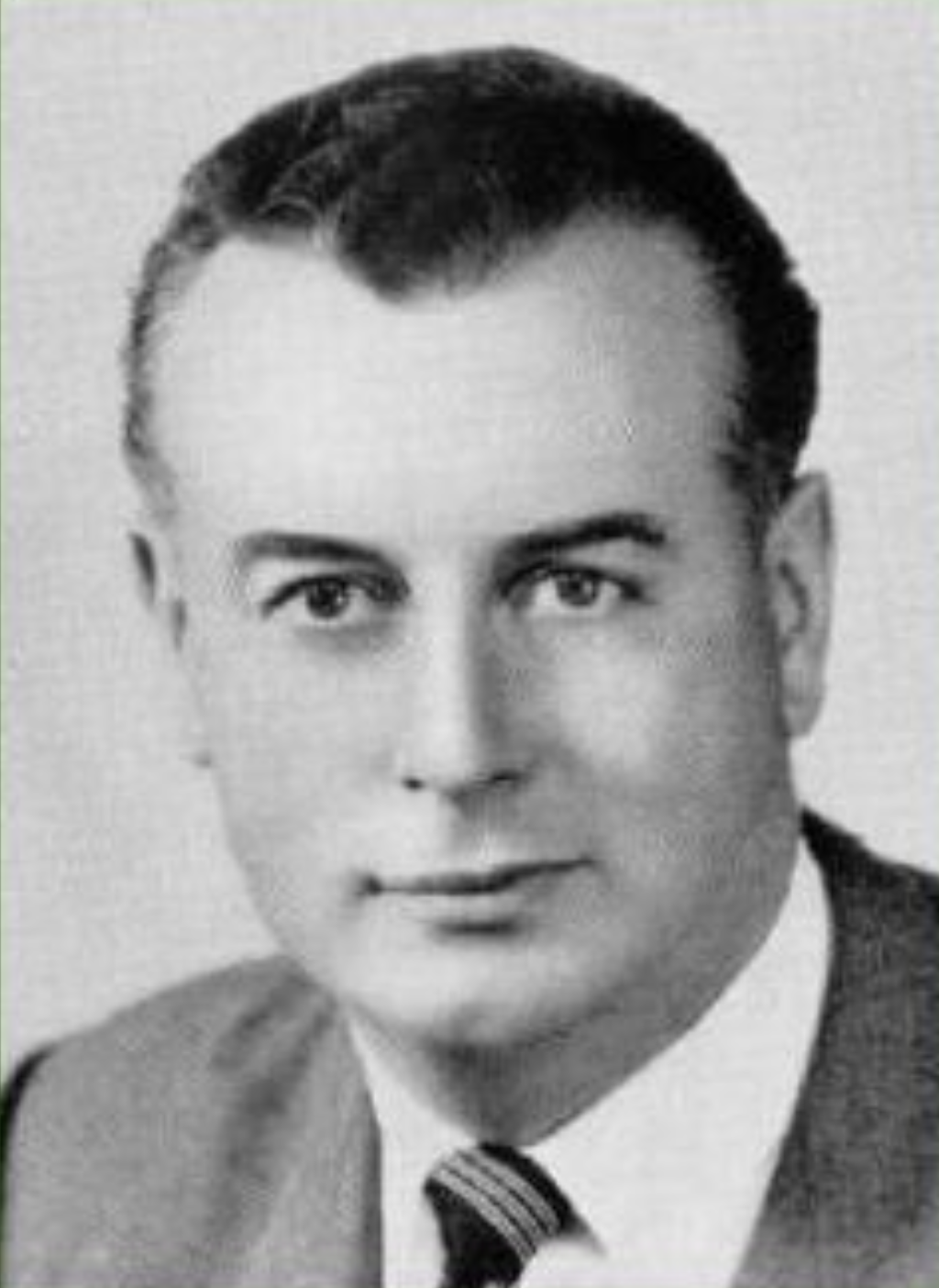
Whitlam as a newly elected MP, circa 1952

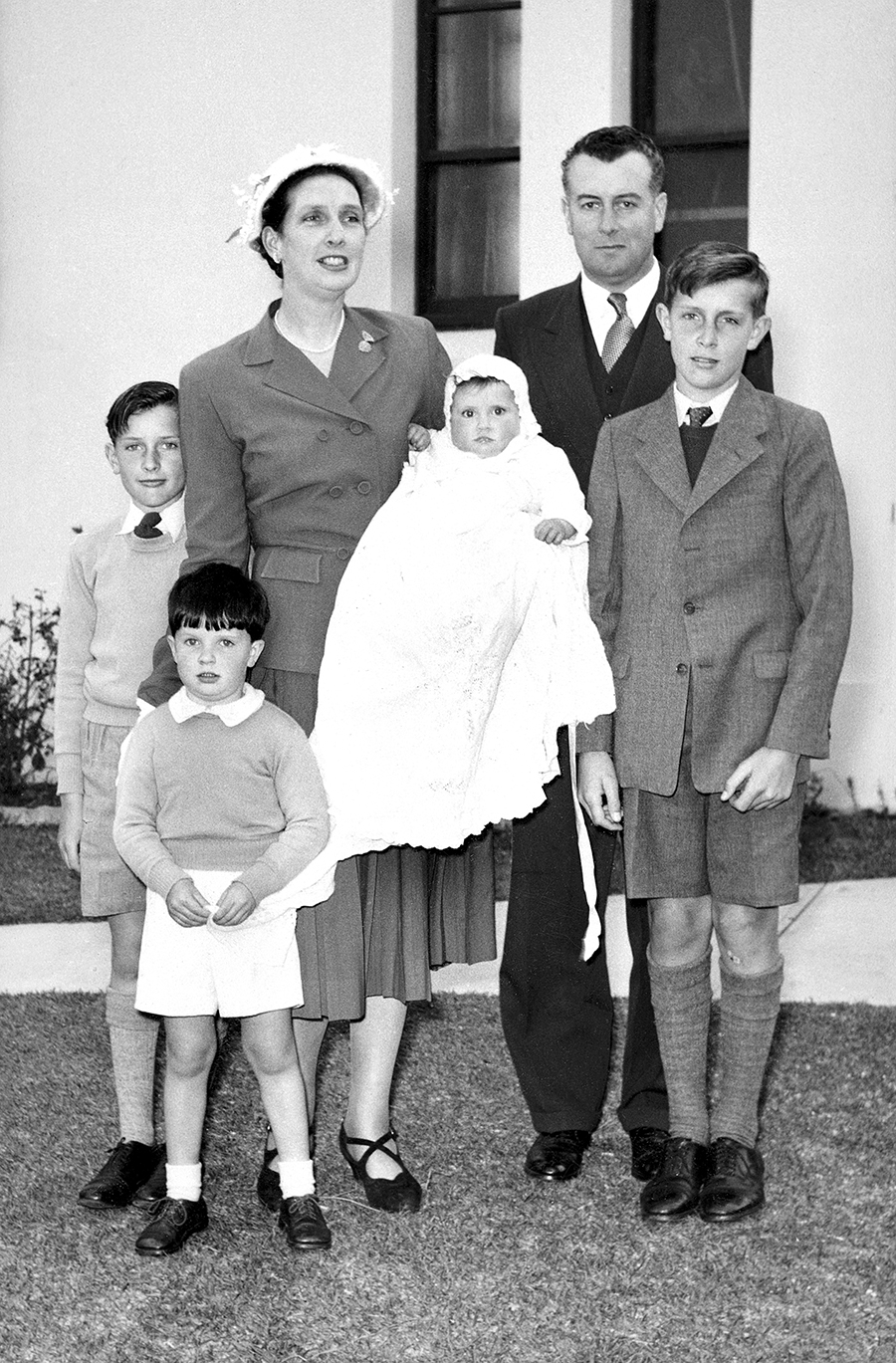
Whitlam with his wife Margaret and their four children in 1954

With his war service loan, Whitlam built a house in seaside Cronulla. He also bought the block of land next door, using the prize money (£1,000 in security bonds) he received in the Australian National Quiz Championship. Whitlam was joint winner in 1948, was runner-up in 1949, and was one of four prize-winning finalists in 1950.

He sought to make a career in the ALP in Cronulla, but local Labor supporters were sceptical of Whitlam's loyalties, given his privileged background. In the postwar years he practised law, concentrating on landlord/tenant matters, and sought to build his bona fides in the party. He ran twice – unsuccessfully – for the local council, once (also unsuccessfully) for the New South Wales Legislative Assembly, and campaigned for other candidates. In 1951, Bert Lazzarini, the Labor member for the Federal electorate of Werriwa, announced that he would stand down at the next election. Whitlam won the preselection as ALP candidate. Lazzarini died in 1952 before completing his term and Whitlam was elected to the House of Representatives in the ensuing by-election on 29 November 1952. Whitlam trebled Lazzarini's majority in a 12 per cent swing to Labor.

Whitlam joined the ALP minority in the House of Representatives. His maiden speech provoked an interruption by a future prime minister, John McEwen, who was then told by the Speaker that maiden speeches are traditionally heard in silence. Whitlam responded to McEwen by saying Benjamin Disraeli had been heckled in his maiden speech and had responded, "The time will come when you shall hear me." He told McEwen, "The time will come when you may interrupt me." According to early Whitlam biographers Laurie Oakes and David Solomon, this cool response put the Coalition government on notice that he would be a force to be reckoned with.

In the rough and tumble debate in the House of Representatives, Whitlam called fellow MHR Bill Bourke "this grizzling Quisling", Garfield Barwick (who, as High Court Chief Justice, played a role in Whitlam's downfall) a "bumptious bastard", and he said Bill Wentworth exhibited a "hereditary streak of insanity". After calling future prime minister William McMahon a "quean", he apologised.

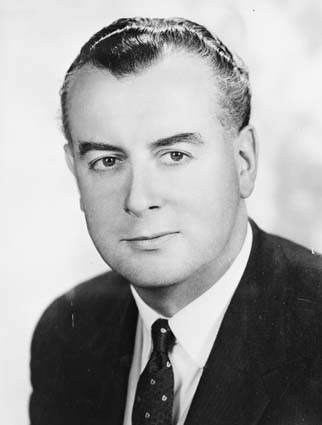
Whitlam in 1959

The ALP had been out of office since the Chifley Government's defeat in 1949 and, since 1951, had been under the leadership of Herbert Evatt, whom Whitlam greatly admired. In 1954, the ALP seemed likely to return to power. The prime minister, Robert Menzies, adroitly used the defection of a Soviet official to his advantage, and his coalition of the Liberal and Country parties was returned in the 1954 election with a seven-seat majority. After the election, Evatt attempted to purge the party of industrial groupers, who had long dissented from party policy, and who were predominantly Catholic and anti-communist. The ensuing division in the ALP, which came to be known as "The Split", sparked the birth of the Democratic Labor Party (DLP). The conflict helped to keep Labor out of power for a generation, since DLP supporters chose the Liberal Party in preferential voting. Whitlam supported Evatt throughout this period.

In 1955, a redistribution divided Whitlam's electorate of Werriwa in two, with his Cronulla home located in the new electorate of Hughes. Although Whitlam would have received ALP support in either division, he chose to continue standing for Werriwa and moved from Cronulla to Cabramatta. This meant even longer journeys for his older children to attend school, as they attended school in Sydney.

Whitlam was appointed to the Parliamentary Joint Committee on Constitutional Review in 1956. Biographer Jenny Hocking calls his service on the committee, which included members from all parties in both chambers of Parliament, one of the "great influences in his political development". According to Hocking, service on the committee caused Whitlam to focus not on internal conflicts consuming the ALP, but on Labor goals which were possible and worthwhile in the constitutional framework. Many Labor goals, such as nationalisation, ran contrary to the Constitution. Whitlam came to believe the Constitution – and especially Section 96 (which allowed the federal government to make grants to the states) – could be used to advance a worthwhile Labor program.

=== Deputy Leader, 1960–1967 ===
By the late 1950s Whitlam was seen as a leadership contender once the existing Labor leaders exited the scene. Most of the party's major figures, including Evatt, Deputy Leader Arthur Calwell, Eddie Ward, and Reg Pollard, were in their sixties, twenty years older than Whitlam. In 1960, after losing three elections, Evatt resigned and was replaced by Calwell, with Whitlam defeating Ward for deputy leader. Calwell came within a handful of votes of winning the cliffhanger 1961 election. He had not wanted Whitlam as deputy leader, and believed Labor would have won if Ward had been in the position.

Soon after the 1961 election, events began to turn against Labor. When President Sukarno of Indonesia announced that he intended to take over West New Guinea as the colonial Dutch departed, Calwell responded by declaring that Indonesia must be stopped by force. Calwell's statement was called "crazy and irresponsible" by Prime Minister Menzies, and the incident reduced public support for the ALP. At that time, the Federal Conference of the Labor Party, which dictated policy to parliamentary members, consisted of six members from each state, but not Calwell or Whitlam. In early 1963 a special conference met in a Canberra hotel to determine Labor policy regarding a proposed US base in northern Australia; Calwell and Whitlam were photographed by The Daily Telegraph peering in through the doors, waiting for the verdict. In an accompanying story, Alan Reid of the Telegraph wrote that Labor was ruled by "36 faceless men". The Liberals seized on it, issuing a leaflet called "Mr Calwell and the Faceless Men" which accused Calwell and Whitlam of taking direction from "36 unknown men, not elected to Parliament nor responsible to the people".

Menzies manipulated the Opposition on issues that bitterly divided it, such as direct aid to the states for private schools, and the proposed base. He called an early election for November 1963, standing in support of those two issues. The prime minister performed better than Calwell on television and received an unexpected boost after the assassination of President John F. Kennedy of the US. As a result, the Coalition easily defeated Labor on a 10-seat swing. Whitlam had hoped Calwell would step down after 1963, but he remained, reasoning that Evatt had been given three opportunities to win, and that he should be allowed a third try. Calwell dismissed proposals that the ALP leader and deputy leader should be entitled to membership of the party's conference (or on its governing 12-person Federal Executive, which had two representatives from each state), and instead ran successfully for one of the conference's Victoria seats. Labor did badly in a 1964 by-election in the Tasmanian electorate of Denison, and lost seats in the 1964 half-Senate election. The party was also defeated in the state elections in the most populous state, New South Wales, surrendering control of the state government for the first time since 1941.

Whitlam's relationship with Calwell, never good, deteriorated further after publication of a 1965 article in The Australian reporting off-the-record comments Whitlam had made that his leader was "too old and weak" to win office, and that the party might be gravely damaged by an "old-fashioned" 70-year-old Calwell seeking his first term as prime minister. Later that year, at Whitlam's and Don Dunstan's urging, and over Calwell's objection, the biennial party conference made major changes to the party's platform: deleting support for the White Australia policy and making the ALP's leader and deputy leader ex officio members of the conference and executive, along with the party's leader and deputy leader in the Senate. As Whitlam considered the Senate unrepresentative, he opposed the admission of its ALP leaders to the party's governing bodies.

Menzies retired in January 1966, and was succeeded as prime minister by the new Liberal Party leader, Harold Holt. After years of politics being dominated by the elderly Menzies and Calwell, the younger Holt was seen as a breath of fresh air, and attracted public interest and support in the run-up to the November election.

In early 1966, the 36-member conference, with Calwell's assent, banned any ALP parliamentarian from supporting federal assistance to the states for spending on both government and private schools, commonly called "state aid". Whitlam broke with the party on the issue, and was charged with gross disloyalty by the executive, an offence which carried the penalty of expulsion from the party. Before the matter could be heard, Whitlam left for Queensland, where he campaigned intensively for the ALP candidate Rex Patterson in the Dawson by-election. The ALP won, dealing the government its first by-election defeat since 1952. Whitlam survived the expulsion vote by a margin of only two, gaining both Queensland votes. At the end of April, Whitlam challenged Calwell for the leadership; though Calwell received two-thirds of the vote, he announced that if the party lost the upcoming election, he would not stand again for the leadership.

Holt called an election for November 1966, in which Australia's involvement in the Vietnam War was a major issue. Calwell called for an "immediate and unconditional withdrawal" of Australian troops from Vietnam. Whitlam, however, said this would deprive Australia of any voice in a settlement, and that regular troops, rather than conscripts, should remain under some circumstances. Calwell considered Whitlam's remark disastrous, disputing the party line just five days before the election. The ALP suffered a crushing defeat; the party was reduced to 41 seats in the House of Representatives. Shortly after the election, Whitlam faced another expulsion vote for his stance on Vietnam, and survived. True to his word, Calwell resigned two months after the election. At the caucus meeting on 8 February 1967, Whitlam was elected party leader, defeating leading left-wing candidate Jim Cairns.

== Leader of the Opposition, 1967–1972 ==
=== Reforming the ALP ===
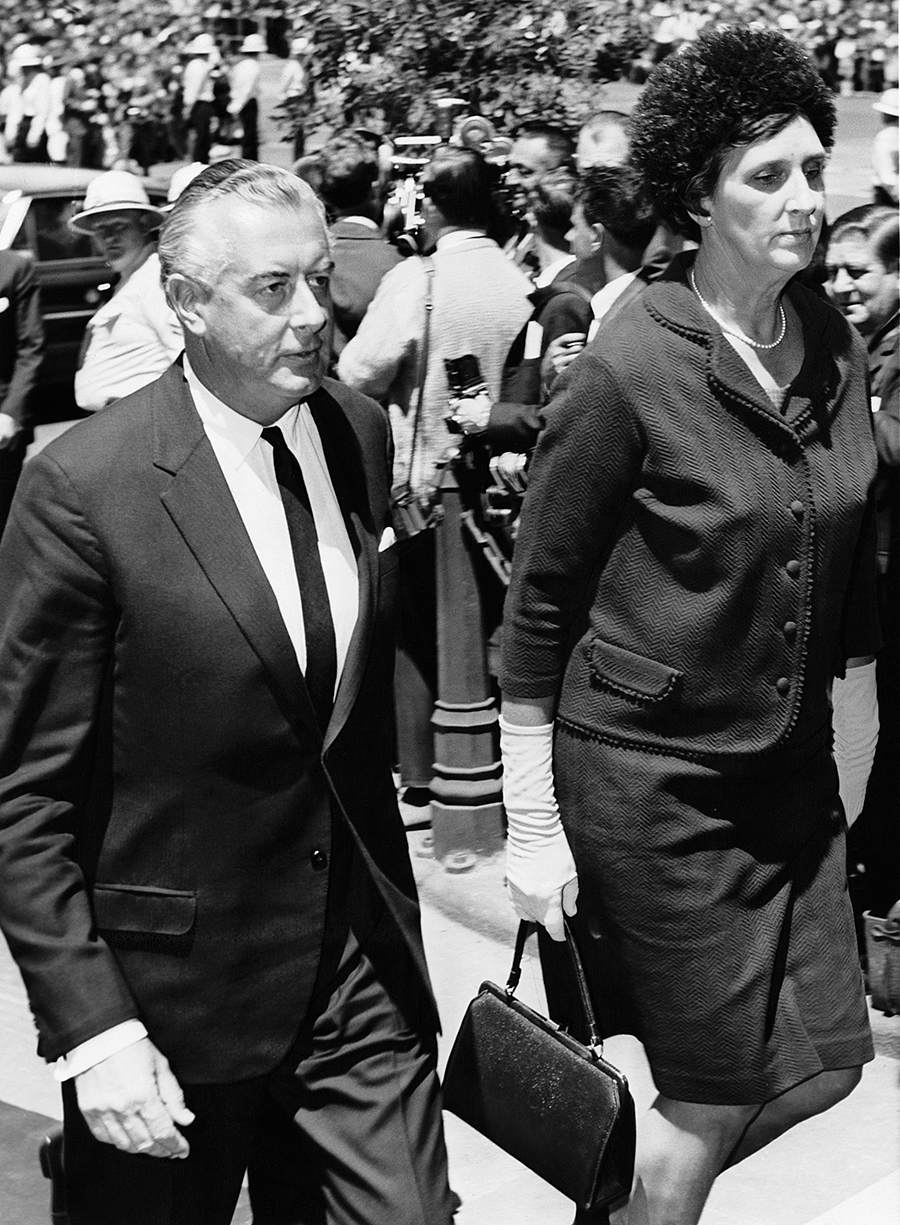
Whitlam and his wife Margaret entering the memorial service for Harold Holt in December 1967

Whitlam believed the Labor Party had little chance of being elected unless it could expand its appeal from the traditional working-class base to include the suburban middle class. He sought to shift control of the ALP from union officials to the parliamentary party, and hoped even rank-and-file party members could be given a voice in the conference. In 1968, controversy erupted within the party when the executive refused to seat new Tasmanian delegate Brian Harradine, a Whitlam supporter who was considered a right-wing extremist. Whitlam resigned the leadership, demanding a vote of confidence from caucus. He defeated Cairns for the leadership in an unexpectedly close 38–32 vote. Despite the vote, the executive refused to seat Harradine.

With the ALP's governing bodies unwilling to reform themselves, Whitlam worked to build support for change among ordinary party members. He successfully reduced union influence in the party, though he was never able to give the rank and file a direct vote in selecting the executive. The Victoria branch of the party had long been a problem; its executive was far to the left of the rest of the ALP, and had little electoral success. Whitlam was able to reconstruct the Victoria party organisation against the will of its leaders, and the reconstituted state party proved essential to victory in the 1972 election.

By the time of the 1969 party conference, Whitlam had gained considerable control over the ALP. That conference passed 61 resolutions, including broad changes to party policy and procedures. It called for the establishment of an Australian Schools Commission to consider the proper level of state aid for schools and universities, recognition of Aboriginal land claims, and expanded party policy on universal health care. The conference also called for increased federal involvement in urban planning, and formed the basis of "The Program" of modern socialism which Whitlam and the ALP presented to voters in 1972.

Since 1918, Labor had called for the abolition of the existing Australian Constitution, and the vesting of all political power in Parliament, a plan which would turn the states into powerless geographic regions. Beginning in 1965, Whitlam sought to change this goal. He finally succeeded at the 1971 ALP Conference in Launceston, Tasmania, which called for Parliament to receive "such plenary powers as are necessary and desirable" to achieve the ALP's goals in domestic and international affairs. Labor also pledged to abolish the Senate; this goal was not erased from the party platform until 1979, after Whitlam had stepped down as leader.

=== Leader of the Opposition ===
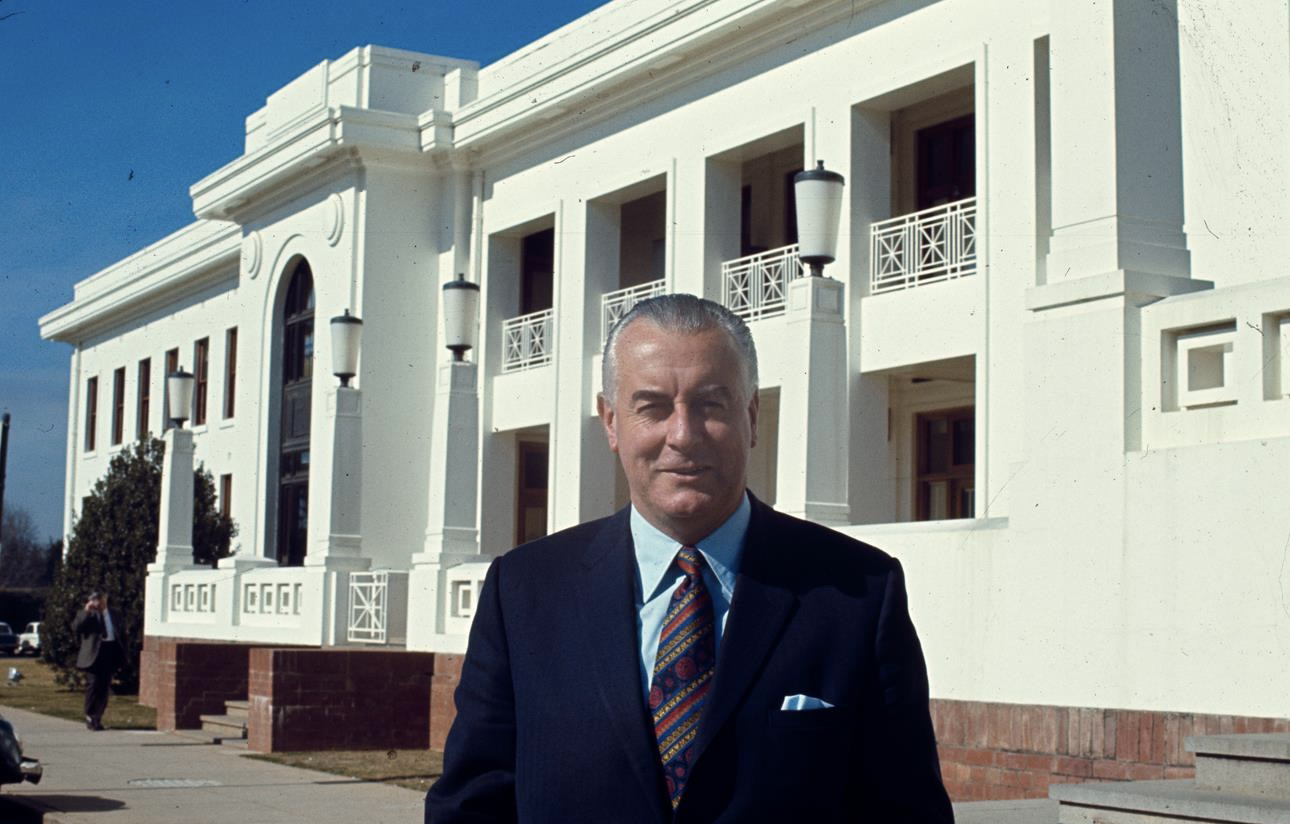
Whitlam in August 1971

Soon after taking the leadership, Whitlam reorganised the ALP caucus, assigning portfolios and turning the Labor frontbench into a shadow cabinet. While the Liberal–Country Coalition had a huge majority in the House of Representatives, Whitlam energised the party by campaigning intensively to win two by-elections in 1967: first in Corio in Victoria, and later that year in Capricornia in Queensland. The November half-Senate election saw a moderate swing to Labor and against the Coalition, compared with the general election the previous year. These federal victories, in which both Whitlam and Holt campaigned, helped give Whitlam the leverage he needed to carry out party reforms.

At the end of 1967, Holt vanished while swimming in rough seas near Melbourne; his body was never recovered. John McEwen, as leader of the junior Coalition partner, the Country Party, took over as prime minister for three weeks until the Liberals could elect a new leader. Senator John Gorton won the vote and became prime minister. The leadership campaign was conducted mostly by television, and Gorton appeared to have the visual appeal needed to keep Whitlam out of office. Gorton resigned his seat in the Senate, and in February 1968 won the by-election for Holt's seat of Higgins in Victoria. For the remainder of the year, Gorton appeared to have the better of Whitlam in the House of Representatives. In his chronicle of the Whitlam years, however, speechwriter Graham Freudenberg asserts that Gorton's erratic behaviour, Whitlam's strengthening of his party, and events outside Australia (such as the Vietnam War) ate away at Liberal dominance.

Gorton called an election for October 1969. Whitlam and the ALP, with little internal dissension, stood on a platform calling for domestic reform, an end to conscription, and the withdrawal of Australian troops from Vietnam by 1 July 1970. Whitlam knew that, given the ALP's poor position after the 1966 election, victory was unlikely. Nevertheless, Whitlam scored an 18-seat swing, Labor's best performance since losing government in 1949. It also scored a 7.1 per cent two-party swing, the largest to not result in a change of government. Although the Coalition was returned for an eighth term in government, it was with a slim majority of three seats, down from 19 prior to the election. Labor actually won a bare majority of the two-party vote and only DLP preferences, especially in Melbourne-area seats, kept Whitlam from becoming prime minister. The 1970 half-Senate election brought little change to Coalition control, but the Coalition vote fell below 40 per cent for the first time, representing a severe threat to Gorton's leadership.

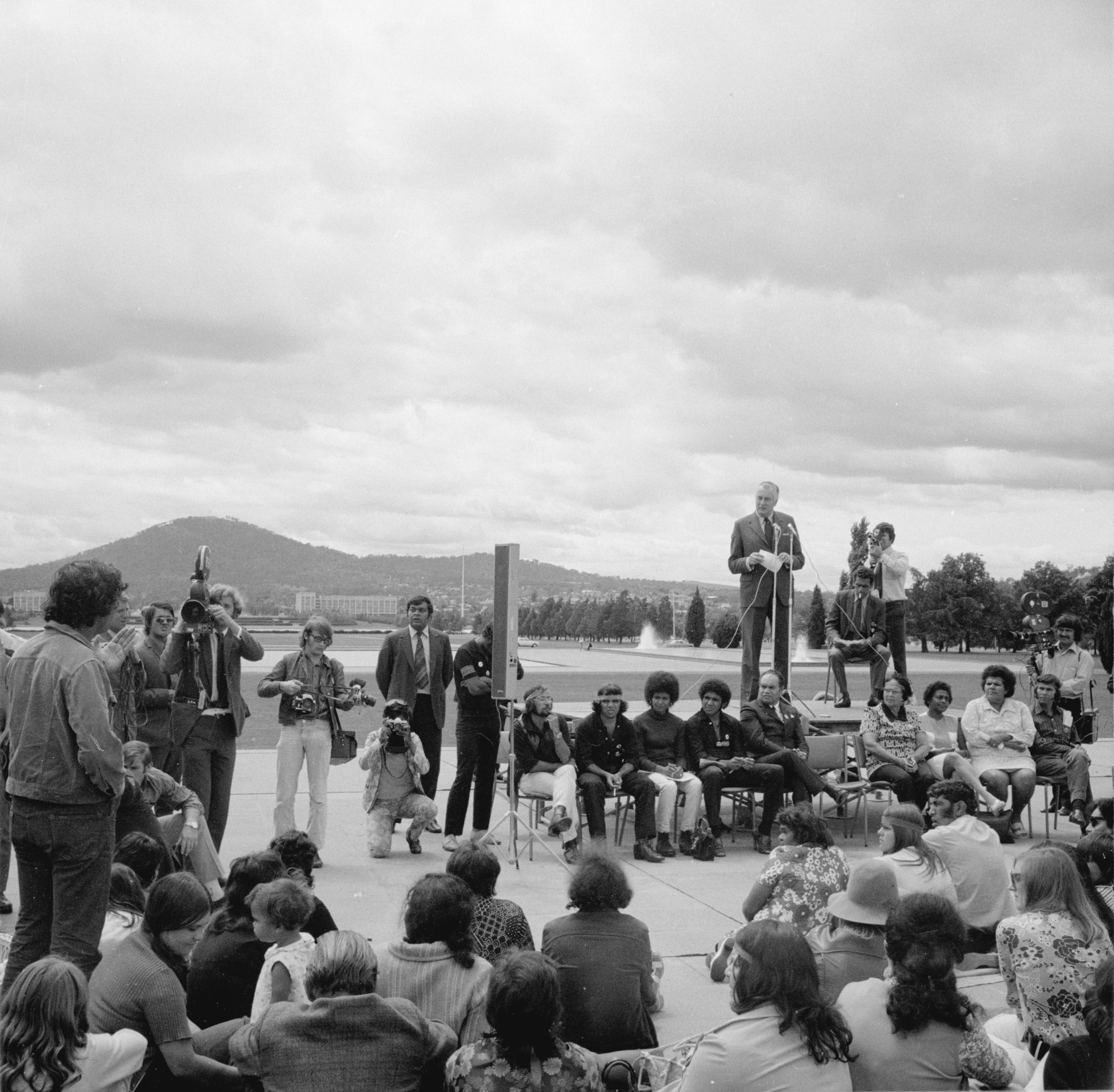
Whitlam speaking at the Aboriginal Tent Embassy, February 1972

In March 1971, the resentment against Gorton came to a head when a confidence vote in the Liberal caucus resulted in a tie. Declaring that this was a sign he no longer had the confidence of the party, Gorton resigned, and William McMahon was elected his successor. With the Liberals in turmoil, Whitlam and the ALP sought to gain public trust as a credible government-in-waiting. The party's actions, such as its abandonment of the White Australia policy, gained favourable media attention. The Labor leader flew to Papua New Guinea and pledged himself to the independence of what was then under Australian trusteeship. In 1971, Whitlam flew to Beijing and met with Chinese officials, including Zhou Enlai. McMahon attacked Whitlam for the visit and claimed that the Chinese had manipulated him. This attack backfired when President Richard Nixon of the US announced that he would visit China the following year. His National Security Advisor, Henry Kissinger, visited Beijing between 9–11 July (less than a week after Whitlam's visit), and, unknown to Whitlam, some of Kissinger's staff had been in Beijing at the same time as the Labor delegation. According to Whitlam biographer Jenny Hocking, the incident transformed Whitlam into an international statesman, while McMahon was seen as reacting defensively to Whitlam's foreign policy ventures. Other errors by McMahon, such as a confused ad-lib speech while visiting Washington, and a statement to President Suharto of Indonesia that Australia was a "west European nation", also damaged the government.

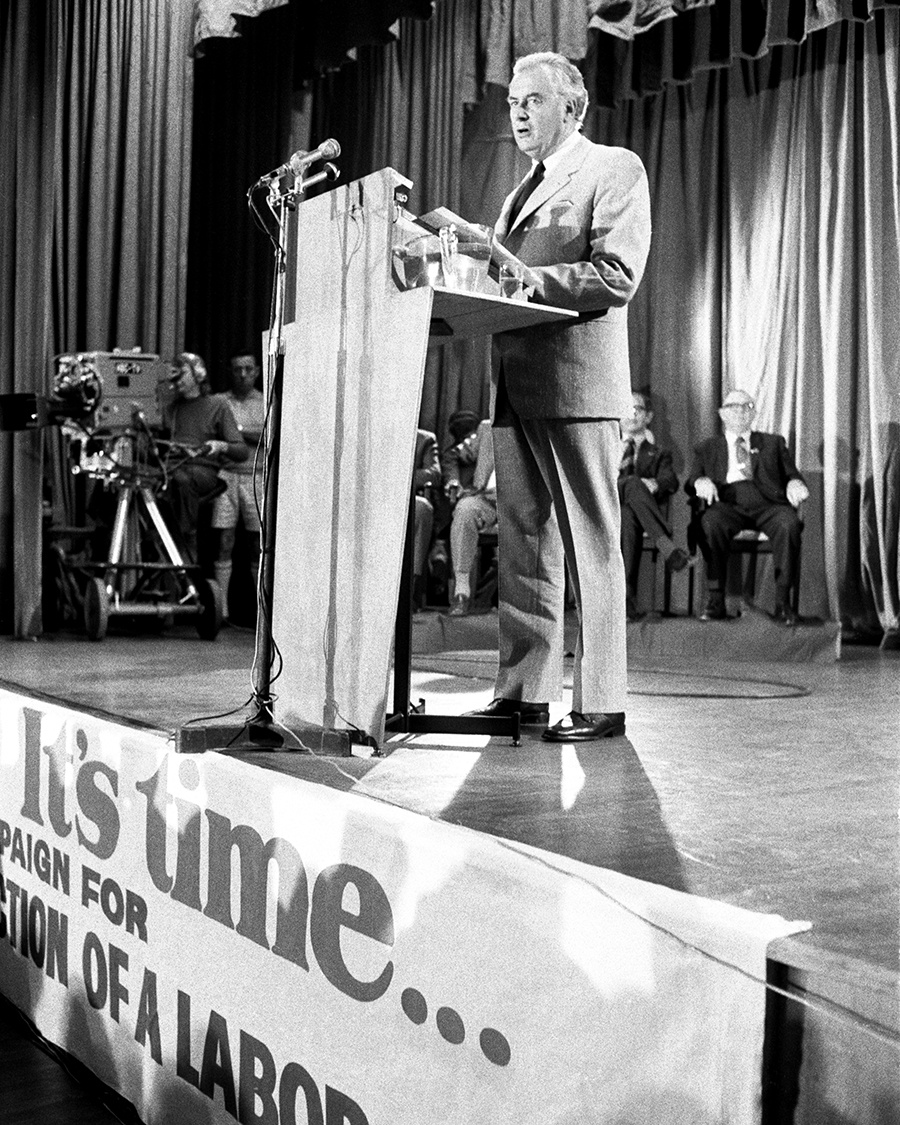
Whitlam giving a speech during the 1972 election campaign

By early 1972, Labor had established a clear lead in the polls; indeed, for the first time since 1955 its support was greater than the combined vote for the Coalition and DLP. Unemployment was at a ten-year peak, rising to 2.14 per cent in August (though the unemployment rate was calculated differently compared to the present, and did not include thousands of rural workers on Commonwealth-financed relief work). Inflation was also at its highest rate since the early 1950s. The government recovered slightly in the August Budget session of Parliament, proposing income tax cuts and increased spending. The Labor strategy for the run-up to the election was to sit back and allow the Coalition to make mistakes. Whitlam controversially stated in March "draft-dodging is not a crime" and that he would be open to a revaluation of the Australian dollar. With the Coalition sinking in the polls and his own personal approval ratings down as low as 28 per cent, McMahon waited as long as he could, finally calling an election for the House of Representatives for 2 December. Whitlam noted that the polling day was the anniversary of the Battle of Austerlitz at which another "ramshackle, reactionary coalition" had been given a "crushing defeat".

Labor campaigned under the slogan "It's Time", an echo of Menzies' successful 1949 slogan, "It's Time for a Change". Surveys showed that even Liberal voters approved of the Labor slogan. Whitlam pledged an end to conscription and the release of individuals who had refused the draft; an income tax surcharge to pay for universal health insurance; free dental care for students; and renovation of ageing urban infrastructure. The party pledged to eliminate university tuition fees and establish a schools commission to evaluate educational needs. The party benefited from the support of the proprietor of News Limited, Rupert Murdoch, who preferred Whitlam over McMahon. Labor was so dominant in the campaign that some of Whitlam's advisers urged him to stop joking about McMahon; people were feeling sorry for him. The election saw the ALP increase its tally by 12 seats, mostly in suburban Sydney and Melbourne, for a majority of nine in the House of Representatives. The ALP gained little beyond the suburban belts, however, losing a seat in South Australia and two in Western Australia.

== Prime Minister, 1972–1975 ==
=== First term ===
==== Duumvirate ====
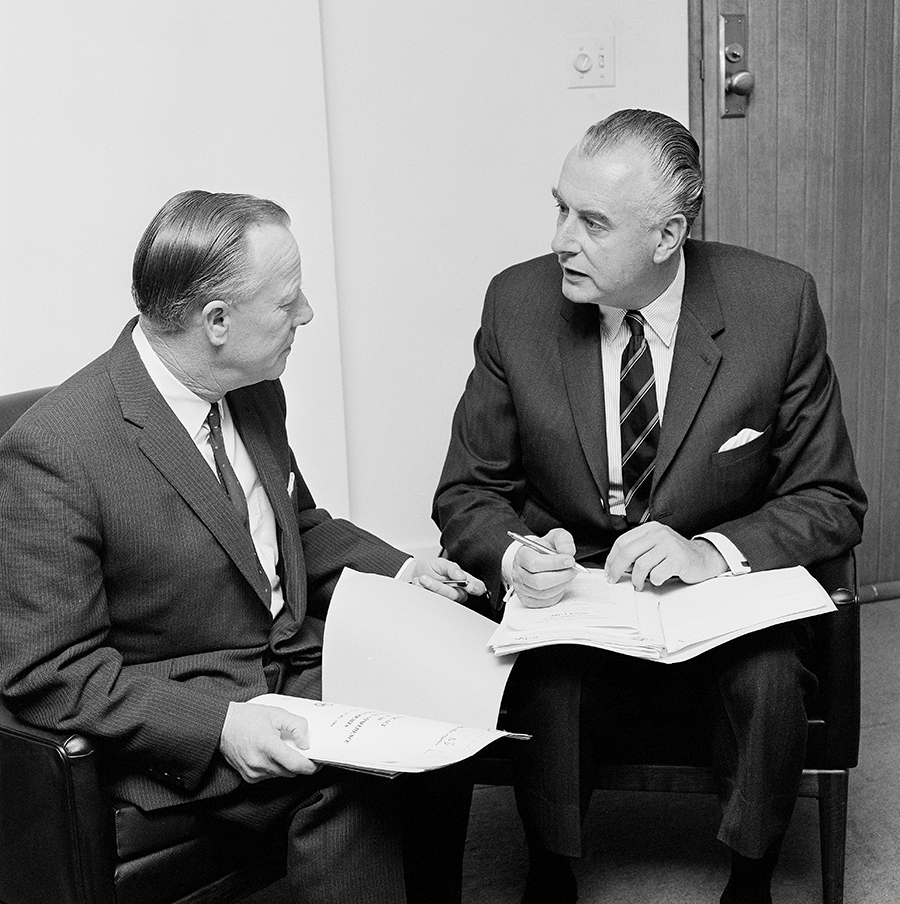
Whitlam and his deputy, Lance Barnard

Whitlam took office with a majority in the House of Representatives, but without control of the Senate (elected in the 1967 and 1970 half-elections). The Senate at that time consisted of ten members from each of the six states, elected by single transferable vote. Historically, when Labor won government, the parliamentary caucus chose the ministers, with the party leader having the power only to assign portfolios. However, the new Labor caucus would not meet until after the final results came in on 15 December.

With Labor's win beyond doubt even though counting was still underway, McMahon advised the governor-general, Sir Paul Hasluck, that he was no longer in a position to govern. Soon afterward, Whitlam advised Hasluck that he could form a government with his new majority. This was in accordance with longstanding Australian constitutional practice. Convention also held that McMahon would stay on as caretaker prime minister until the full results were in. However, Whitlam was unwilling to wait that long. On 5 December, per Whitlam's request, Hasluck swore Whitlam and Labor's deputy leader, Lance Barnard, as an interim two-man government, with Whitlam as prime minister and Barnard as deputy prime minister. The two men held 27 portfolios during the two weeks before a full cabinet could be determined.

During the two weeks the so-called "duumvirate" held office, Whitlam sought to fulfill those campaign promises that did not require legislation. Whitlam ordered negotiations to establish full relations with the People's Republic of China, and broke those with Taiwan. The diplomatic relations were established in 1972 and an embassy opened in Beijing in 1973. Legislation allowed the defence minister to grant exemptions from conscription. Barnard held this office, and exempted everyone. Seven men were at that time incarcerated for refusing conscription; Whitlam arranged for their liberation. The Whitlam government in its first days reopened the equal pay case pending before the Commonwealth Conciliation and Arbitration Commission, and appointed a woman, Elizabeth Evatt, to the commission. Whitlam and Barnard eliminated sales tax on contraceptive pills, announced major grants for the arts, and appointed an interim schools commission. The duumvirate barred racially discriminatory sports teams from Australia, and instructed the Australian delegation at the United Nations to vote in favour of sanctions on apartheid South Africa and Rhodesia. It also ordered the Australian Army Training Team home from Vietnam, ending Australia's involvement in the war; most troops, including all conscripts, had been withdrawn by McMahon. According to Whitlam's speechwriter Graham Freudenberg, the duumvirate was a success, as it showed that the Labor government could manipulate the machinery of government, despite almost a quarter-century in opposition. However, Freudenberg noted that the rapid pace and public excitement caused by the duumvirate's actions caused the Opposition to be wary of giving Labor too easy a time, and gave rise to one post-mortem assessment of the Whitlam government: "We did too much too soon."

==== Enacting a program ====
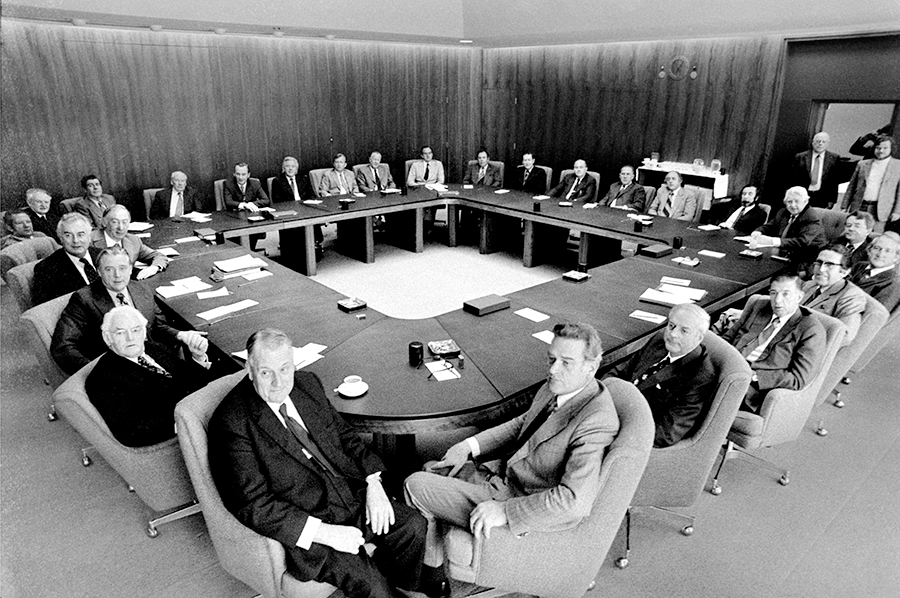
Members of the Third Whitlam Ministry in 1974

The McMahon government had consisted of 27 ministers, twelve of whom comprised the Cabinet. In the run-up to the election, the Labor caucus had decided that if the party took power all 27 ministers were to be Cabinet members. Intense canvassing took place amongst ALP parliamentarians as the duumvirate did its work, and on 18 December the caucus elected the Cabinet. The results were generally acceptable to Whitlam, and within three hours, he had announced the portfolios of the Cabinet members. To give himself greater control over the Cabinet, in January 1973 Whitlam established five Cabinet committees (with the members appointed by himself, not the caucus) and took full control of the Cabinet agenda.

Whitlam, prime minister for fewer than three years between 1972 and 1975, pushed through a raft of reforms that radically changed Australia's economic, legal and cultural landscape.

The Whitlam government abolished the death penalty for federal crimes. Legal aid was established, with offices in each state capital. It abolished university fees, and established the Schools Commission to allocate funds to schools. Whitlam founded the Department of Urban Development and, having lived in developing Cabramatta, most of which lacked sewage facilities, established the National Sewerage Program, which set a goal to leave no urban home unsewered. The Whitlam government gave grants directly to local government units for urban renewal, flood prevention, and the promotion of tourism. Other federal grants financed highways linking the state capitals, and paid for standard-gauge rail lines between the states. The government attempted to set up a new city at Albury–Wodonga on the Victoria–New South Wales border. The process was started for "Advance Australia Fair" to become the country's national anthem in place of "God Save the Queen". The Order of Australia replaced the British honours system in early 1975.

The Women's Electoral Lobby, founded in 1972, had helped Whitlam win government. In 1973, Elizabeth Reid was appointed the world's first adviser on women's affairs to a head of government. Through Reid's work in this role, the government took a greater role in the protection of women and increasing their rights; and, through the 1974 establishment and later recommendations of a Royal Commission on Human Relationships, a feminist reform agenda was put on the agenda for future action by the government. Among other reforms, the Whitlam government introduced three months' paid maternity leave, along with a week's paid paternity leave, for public servants, as well as the Supporting Mother's Benefit, in 1973.

In 1973, the National Gallery of Australia, then called the Australian National Gallery, bought the painting "Blue Poles" by contemporary artist Jackson Pollock for US$2 million (A$1.3 million at the time of payment), which was about a third of its annual budget. This required Whitlam's personal permission, which he gave on the condition the price was publicised. The purchase created a political and media scandal, and was said to symbolise, alternatively, Whitlam's foresight and vision or his profligate spending.

Whitlam travelled extensively as prime minister, and was the first Australian prime minister to visit China while in office. He was criticised for making this visit, especially after Cyclone Tracy struck Darwin; he interrupted an extensive tour of Europe for 48 hours (deemed too brief a period by many) to view the devastation.

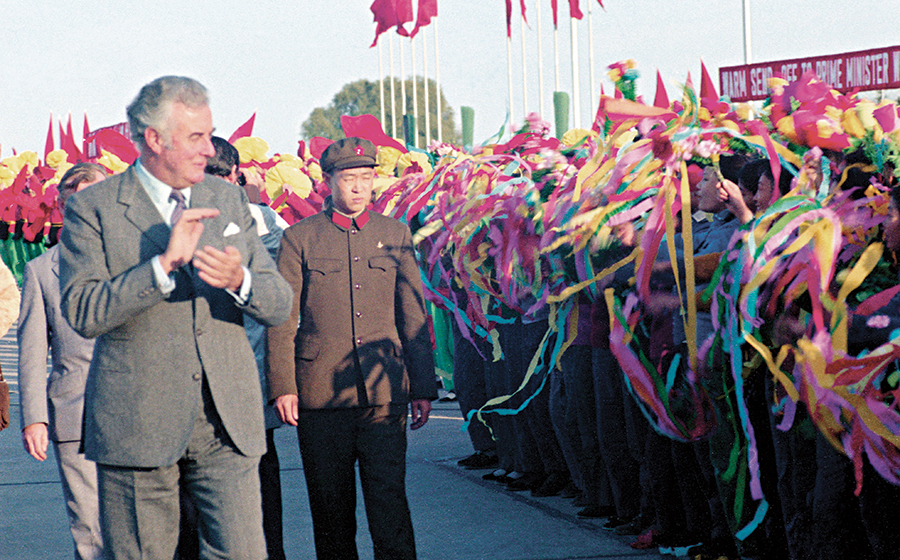
Whitlam visits China, 1973

In keeping with Labor's social commitments, Whitlam's time in office witnessed significant increases in government spending. In one year, for instance, real government spending increased by 20% followed by 16% the following year. During Whitlam's three years in office, social spending (including education) as a percentage of total Commonwealth budget outlays rose from 36.9% to 50.4.% From 1972–73 to 1975–76, spending on education as a percentage of total Commonwealth budget outlays went up from 4.3% to 8.5%, urban development from 0.5% to 1.9,% housing from 2.3% to 2.6%, social security from 20.6% to 23.2%, and health from 7.7% to 13.5%. Under Whitlam, annual Commonwealth outlays went up on average by 10.4%, while Commonwealth government spending as a percentage of GDP increased from 23% to almost 29%. In 1975, Whitlam justified the big increases in government spending by arguing that when Labor returned to office 1972 they had "the task of redressing many years of neglect by previous Governments in almost every field of national life".

==== Early troubles ====
From the start of the Whitlam government, the Opposition, led by Billy Snedden, who replaced McMahon as Liberal leader in December 1972, sought to use control of the Senate to baulk Whitlam. It did not seek to block all government legislation; the Coalition senators, led by Senate Liberal leader Reg Withers, sought to block government legislation only when the obstruction would advance the Opposition's agenda. The Whitlam government also had troubles in relations with the states. New South Wales refused the government's request to close the Rhodesian Information Centre in Sydney. The Queensland premier, Joh Bjelke-Petersen refused to consider any adjustment in Queensland's border with Papua New Guinea, which, due to the state's ownership of islands in the Torres Strait, came within half a kilometre of the Papuan mainland. Liberal state governments in New South Wales and Victoria were re-elected by large margins in 1973. Whitlam and his majority in the House of Representatives proposed a constitutional referendum in December 1973, transferring control of wages and prices from the states to the federal government. The two propositions failed to attract a majority of voters in any state, and were rejected by over 800,000 votes nationwide.

In 1974, the Senate refused to pass six bills after they were passed twice by the House of Representatives. With the Opposition threatening to disrupt money supply to government, Whitlam used the Senate's recalcitrance to trigger a double dissolution election, holding it instead of the half-Senate election. After a campaign featuring the Labor slogan "Give Gough a fair go", the Whitlam government was returned, with its majority in the House of Representatives cut from seven to five and its Senate seats increased by three. It was only the second time since Federation that a Labor government had been elected to a second full term. The government and the opposition each had 29 Senators with two seats held by independents. The deadlock over the twice-rejected bills was broken, uniquely in Australian history, with a special joint sitting of the two houses of Parliament under Section 57 of the Constitution. This session, authorised by the new governor-general, Sir John Kerr, passed bills providing for universal health insurance (known then as Medibank, today as Medicare) and providing the Northern Territory and Australian Capital Territory with representation in the Senate, effective at the next election.

==== Murphy raids ====
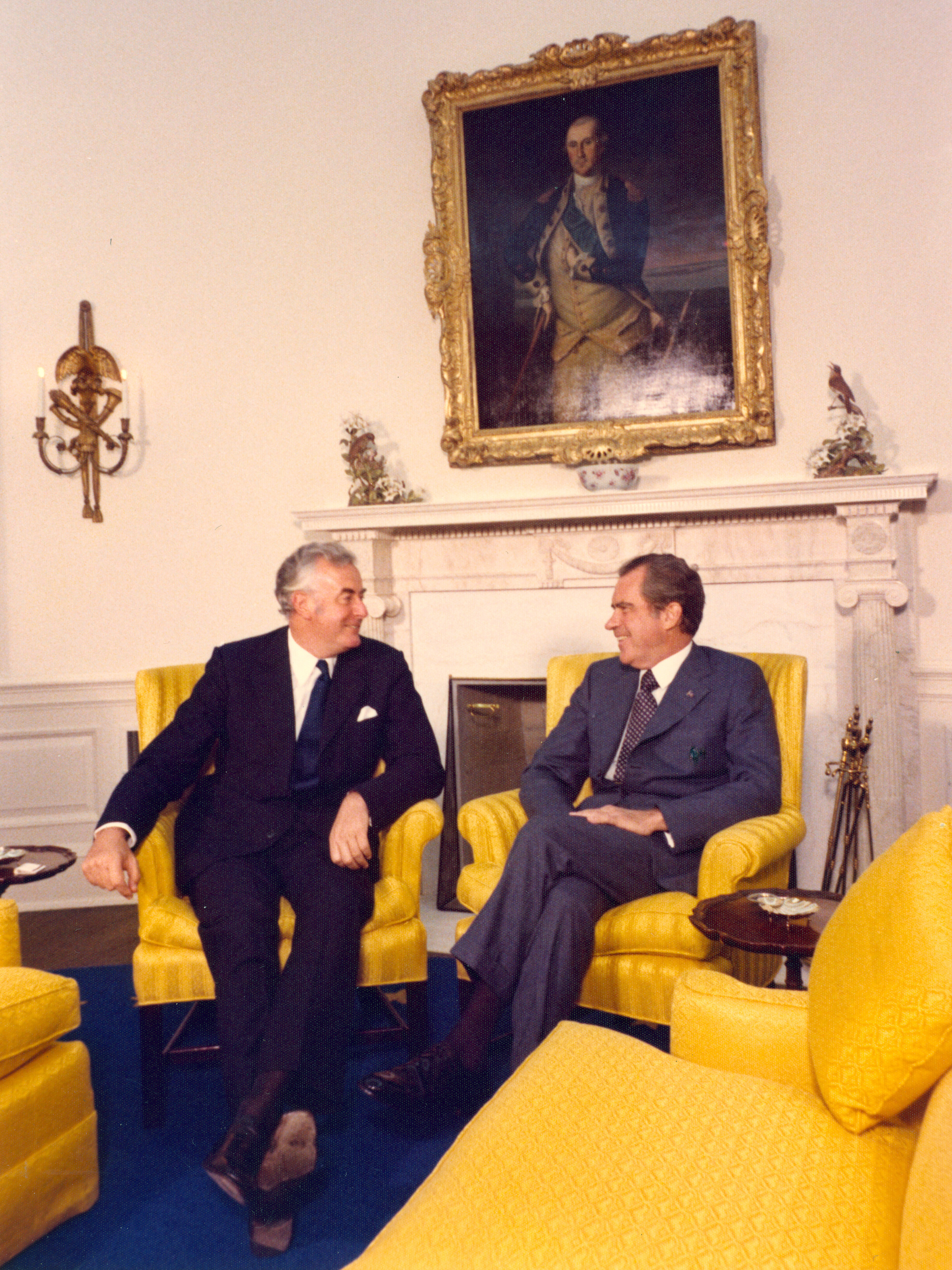
Whitlam visits US President Richard Nixon, July 1973

In February 1973, the attorney-general, Senator Lionel Murphy, led a police raid on the Melbourne office of the Australian Security Intelligence Organisation, which was under his ministerial responsibility. Murphy believed that ASIO might have files relating to threats against Yugoslav Prime Minister Džemal Bijedić, who was about to visit Australia, and feared ASIO might conceal or destroy them. The Opposition attacked the Government over the raid, terming Murphy a "loose cannon". A Senate investigation of the incident was cut short when Parliament was dissolved in 1974. According to journalist and author Wallace Brown, the controversy continued to dog the Whitlam government throughout its term, because the incident was "so silly".

==== Gair Affair ====
By early 1974, the Senate had rejected nineteen government bills, ten of them twice. With a half-Senate election due by mid-year, Whitlam looked for ways to shore up support in that body. Queensland senator and former DLP leader Vince Gair signalled his willingness to leave the Senate for a diplomatic post. Gair's term would not expire until the following half-Senate election or upon a double dissolution election. With five Queensland seats at stake in the half-Senate election, the ALP was expected to win only two, but if six (including Gair's) were at stake, the party would be likely to win a third. Possible control of the Senate was therefore at stake; Whitlam agreed to Gair's request and had Governor-general Sir Paul Hasluck appoint him ambassador to Ireland. Word leaked of Gair's pending resignation, and Whitlam's opponents attempted to counteract his manoeuvre. On what became known as the "Night of the Long Prawns", Country Party members secreted Gair at a small party in a legislative office as the ALP searched for him to secure his written resignation. As Gair enjoyed beer and prawns, Bjelke-Petersen advised the Queensland governor, Colin Hannah, to issue writs for only the usual five vacancies, since Gair's seat was not yet vacant, effectively countering Whitlam's plan.

=== Second term ===
By mid-1974, Australia was in an economic slump, suffering from the 1973 oil crisis and 1973–1975 recession. The 1973 oil crisis had caused prices to spike and, according to government figures, inflation topped 13 per cent for over a year between 1973 and 1974. Part of the inflation was due to Whitlam's desire to increase wages and conditions of the Commonwealth Public Service as a pacesetter for the private sector. The Whitlam government had cut tariffs by 25 per cent in 1973; 1974 saw an increase in imports of 30 per cent and a $1.5 billion increase in the trade deficit. Primary producers of commodities such as beef were caught in a credit squeeze as short-term rates rose to extremely high levels. Unemployment also rose significantly. Unease within the ALP led to Barnard's defeat when Jim Cairns challenged him for his deputy leadership. Whitlam gave little help to his embattled deputy.

Despite these economic indicators, the Budget presented in August 1974 saw large increases in spending, especially in education. Treasury officials had advised a series of tax and fee increases, ranging from excise taxes to the cost of posting a letter; their advice was mostly rejected by Cabinet. The Budget was unsuccessful in dealing with the inflation and unemployment, and Whitlam introduced large tax cuts in November. He also announced additional spending to help the private sector.

Beginning in October 1974, the Whitlam government sought overseas loans to finance its development plans, with the newly enriched oil nations a likely target. Whitlam attempted to secure financing before informing the Loan Council which included state officials hostile to Whitlam. His government empowered Pakistani financier Tirath Khemlani as an intermediary in the hope of securing US$4 billion in loans. While the Loans Affair did not result in a loan, according to author and Whitlam speechwriter Graham Freudenberg, "The only cost involved was the cost to the reputation of the Government. That cost was to be immense – it was government itself."

Whitlam appointed Senator Murphy to the High Court, even though Murphy's Senate seat would not be up for election if a half-Senate election were held. Labor then held three of the five short-term New South Wales Senate seats. Under proportional representation, Labor could hold its three short-term seats in the next half-Senate election but, if Murphy's seat were also contested, Labor was unlikely to win four out of six. Thus, a Murphy appointment meant the almost certain loss of a seat in the closely divided Senate at the next election. Whitlam appointed Murphy anyway. By convention, senators appointed by the state legislature to fill casual vacancies were from the same political party as the former senator. The New South Wales premier, Tom Lewis, felt that this convention applied only to vacancies caused by deaths or ill-health, and arranged for the legislature to elect Cleaver Bunton, former mayor of Albury and an independent. By March 1975, many Liberal parliamentarians felt Snedden was doing an inadequate job as leader of the Opposition, and that Whitlam was dominating him in the House of Representatives. Malcolm Fraser challenged Snedden for the leadership, and defeated him on 21 March.

Soon after Fraser's accession, controversy arose over the Whitlam government's actions in trying to restart peace talks in Vietnam. As the North prepared to end the civil war, Whitlam sent cables to both Vietnamese governments, telling Parliament both cables were substantially the same. The Opposition contended he had misled Parliament, and a motion to censure Whitlam was defeated along party lines. The Opposition also attacked Whitlam for not allowing enough South Vietnamese refugees into Australia, with Fraser calling for the entry of 50,000. Freudenberg alleges that 1,026 Vietnamese refugees entered Australia in the final eight months of the Whitlam government, and only 399 in 1976 under Fraser. However, by 1977, Australia had accepted more than five thousand refugees.

As the political situation deteriorated, Whitlam and his government continued to enact legislation: The Family Law Act 1975 provided for no-fault divorce while the Racial Discrimination Act 1975 caused Australia to ratify the International Convention on the Elimination of All Forms of Racial Discrimination that Australia had signed under Holt, but which had never been ratified. In August 1975, Whitlam gave the Gurindji people of the Northern Territory title deeds to part of their traditional lands, beginning the process of Aboriginal land reform. The next month, Australia granted independence to Papua New Guinea.

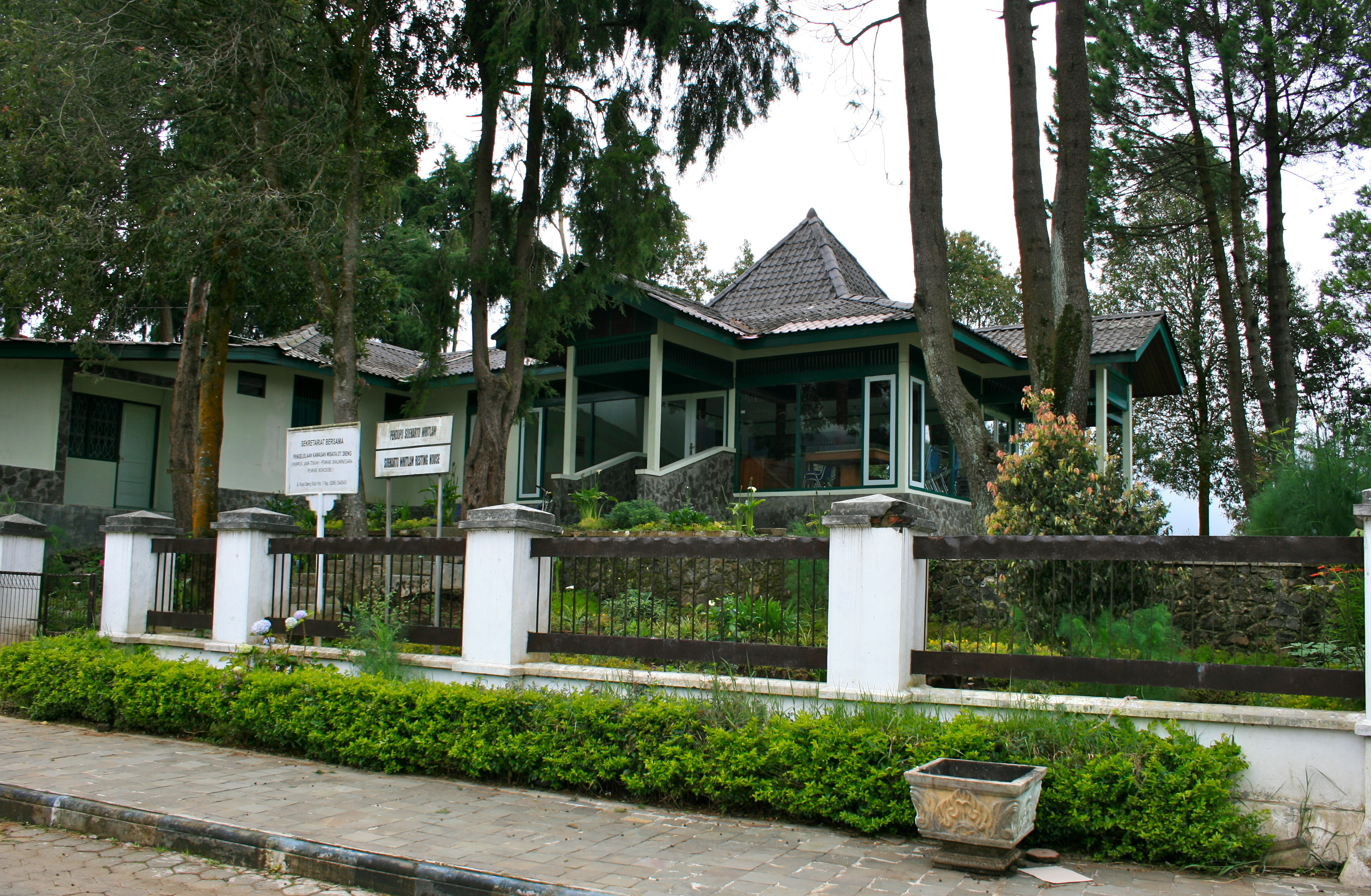
The Suharto-Whitlam House in Dieng Plateau, Indonesia, where Whitlam discussed the future of East Timor with Indonesia's President Suharto in 1974

Following the 1974 Carnation Revolution, Portugal began a process of decolonisation and began a withdrawal from Portuguese Timor (later East Timor). Australians had long taken an interest in the colony; the nation had sent troops to the region during World War II. In September 1974, Whitlam met with President Suharto in Indonesia and indicated that he would support Indonesia if it annexed East Timor. At the height of the Cold War, and in the context of the American retreat from Indo-China, he felt that incorporation of East Timor into Indonesia would enhance the stability of the region, and reduce the risk of the East Timorese FRETILIN movement, which many feared was communist, coming to power.

Whitlam had offered Barnard a diplomatic post and in early 1975 Barnard accepted, triggering a by-election in his Tasmanian electorate of Bass. The election on 28 June proved a disaster for Labor, which lost the seat with a swing against it of 17 per cent. The next week, Whitlam removed deputy prime minister Cairns, who had misled Parliament about the Loans Affair amid controversy about his relationship with his office manager, Junie Morosi. At the time of Cairns's dismissal, one Senate seat was vacant, following the death on 30 June of Queensland ALP Senator Bertie Milliner. The state Labor party nominated Mal Colston, resulting in a deadlock. The unicameral Queensland legislature twice voted against Colston, and the party refused to submit any alternatives. Bjelke-Petersen finally convinced the legislature to elect a low-level union official, Albert Field. In interviews, Field made it clear he would not support Whitlam. Field was expelled from the ALP for standing against Colston, and Labor senators boycotted his swearing-in. Whitlam argued that, because of the manner of filling vacancies, the Senate was "corrupted" and "tainted", with the Opposition enjoying a majority they did not win at the ballot box.

== Dismissal ==
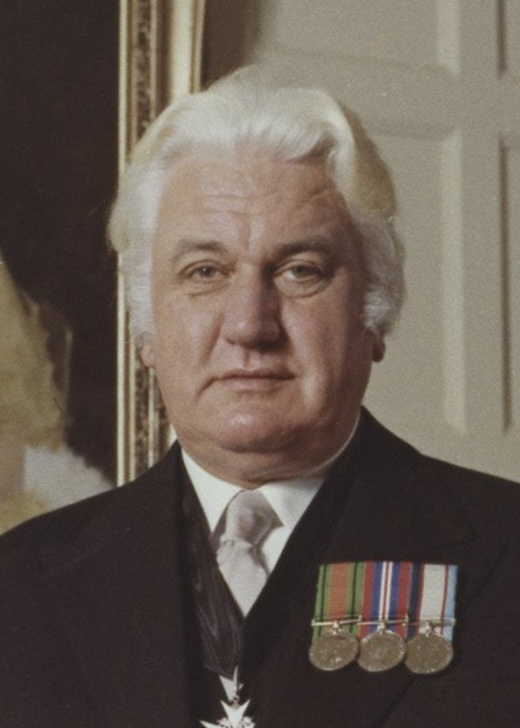
Sir John Kerr

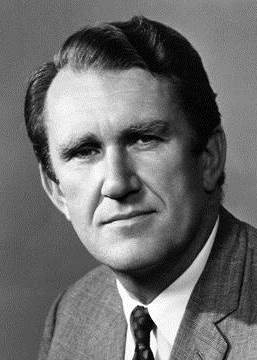
Malcolm Fraser

In October 1975, the Opposition, led by Malcolm Fraser, determined to withhold supply by deferring consideration of appropriation bills. With Field on leave (his Senate appointment having been challenged), the Coalition had an effective majority of 30–29 in the Senate. The Coalition believed that if Whitlam could not deliver supply, and would not advise new elections, Kerr would have to dismiss him. Supply would run out on 30 November.

The stakes were raised on 10 October, when the High Court declared valid the Act granting the territories two senators each. In a half-Senate election, most successful candidates would not take their places until 1 July 1976, but the territories' senators, and those filling Field's and Bunton's seats, would assume their seats immediately. This gave Labor an outside chance of controlling the Senate, at least until 1 July 1976.

On 14 October, Labor minister Rex Connor, mastermind of the loans scheme, was forced to resign when Khemlani released documents showing that Connor had made misleading statements. The continuing scandal bolstered the Coalition in their stance that they would not concede supply. Whitlam, convinced that he would win the battle, was glad of the distraction from the Loans Affair, and believed he would "smash" not only the Senate, but Fraser's leadership.

Whitlam told the House of Representatives on 21 October,

Let me place my government's position clearly on the record. I shall not advise the Governor-General to hold an election for the House of Representatives on behalf of the Senate. I shall tender no advice for an election of either House or both Houses until this constitutional issue is settled. This government, so long as it retains a majority in the House of Representatives, will continue the course endorsed by the Australian people last year.

Whitlam and his ministers repeatedly claimed that the Opposition was damaging not only the constitution, but the economy as well. The Coalition senators remained united, though several became increasingly concerned about the tactic of blocking supply. As the crisis dragged into November, Whitlam attempted to make arrangements for public servants and suppliers to be able to cash cheques at banks. These transactions would be temporary loans which the government would repay once supply was restored. This plan to prolong government without supply was presented to Kerr unsigned on 6 November, under the title "Draft Joint Opinion" (ostensibly of solicitor-general Maurice Byers and attorney-general Kep Enderby). It proposed that public employees, including members of the armed forces and police, "could assign arrears of pay by way of mortgage". The government's refusal to formalise this and other "advice" was a factor justifying Kerr's resort to advice from elsewhere.

Kerr was following the crisis closely. At a luncheon with Whitlam and several of his ministers on 30 October, Kerr suggested a compromise: if Fraser conceded supply, Whitlam would agree not to call the half-Senate election until May or June 1976, or alternatively would agree not to call the Senate into session until after 1 July. Whitlam rejected the idea, seeking to end the Senate's right to deny supply. On 3 November, after a meeting with Kerr, Fraser proposed that if the government agreed to hold a House of Representatives election at the same time as the half-Senate election, the Coalition would concede supply. Whitlam rejected this offer, stating that he had no intention of advising a House election for at least a year.

With the crisis unresolved, Kerr decided to dismiss Whitlam as prime minister. Fearing that Whitlam would go to the Queen and potentially have him removed, the governor-general gave Whitlam no prior hint. Against Whitlam's advice, he conferred with High Court Chief Justice Sir Garfield Barwick, who agreed that he had the power to dismiss Whitlam.

A meeting among the party leaders, including Whitlam and Fraser, to resolve the crisis on the morning of 11 November came to nothing. Kerr and Whitlam met at the governor-general's office that afternoon at 1:00 pm. Unknown to Whitlam, Fraser was waiting in an ante-room; Whitlam later said he would not have set foot in the building if he had known Fraser was there. Whitlam, as he had told Kerr by phone earlier that day, came prepared to advise a half-Senate election, to be held on 13 December. Kerr instead told Whitlam he had terminated his commission as prime minister, and handed him a letter to that effect. After the conversation, Whitlam returned to the prime minister's residence, The Lodge, had lunch and conferred with his advisers. Immediately after his meeting with Whitlam, Kerr commissioned Fraser as caretaker prime minister, on the assurance he could obtain supply and would then advise Kerr to dissolve both houses for election.

In the confusion, Whitlam and his advisers did not immediately tell any Senate members of the dismissal, with the result that when the Senate convened at 2:00 pm, the appropriation bills were rapidly passed, with the ALP senators assuming the Opposition had given in. The bills were soon sent to Kerr to receive Royal Assent. At 2:34 pm, ten minutes after supply had been secured, Fraser rose in the House and announced he was prime minister. Whitlam immediately moved a successful no confidence motion against Fraser. The Speaker, Gordon Scholes, was instructed to advise Kerr to reinstate Whitlam.

Whitlam delivering a speech on the steps of Parliament House being dismissed by Kerr

Kerr refused to receive Scholes, keeping him waiting for more than an hour. In that time Kerr rang Justice Anthony Mason to ask for advice. Mason told him the no confidence motion in the House was "irrelevant". Kerr then dissolved Parliament by proclamation: his Official Secretary, David Smith, came to Parliament House to proclaim the dissolution from the front steps. A large, angry crowd had gathered, and Smith was nearly drowned out by their noise. He concluded by taking the unilateral step of re-instating the traditional ending for a royal proclamation "God save the Queen", a practice the Whitlam government had abolished. Whitlam, who had been standing behind Smith, then addressed the crowd:

Well may we say "God save the Queen", because nothing will save the Governor-General! The Proclamation which you have just heard read by the Governor-General's Official Secretary was countersigned Malcolm Fraser, who will undoubtedly go down in Australian history from Remembrance Day 1975 as Kerr's cur. They won't silence the outskirts of Parliament House, even if the inside has been silenced for a few weeks. ... Maintain your rage and enthusiasm for the campaign for the election now to be held and until polling day.

=== Alleged CIA involvement ===
Kerr had been involved with a number of CIA fronts. In the 1950s, Kerr had joined the Association for Cultural Freedom, a conservative group which had been established by, and received funding from, the CIA through the Congress for Cultural Freedom. Kerr was on its executive board and wrote for its magazine Quadrant. In 1966, Kerr helped to found Lawasia (or Law Asia), an organization of lawyers with offices in all the major capitals of Asia. It was funded by The Asia Foundation, a prominent CIA front.

Christopher Boyce, who was convicted of spying for the Soviet Union while an employee of a CIA contractor, said the CIA wanted Whitlam removed from office because he threatened to close US military bases in Australia, including Pine Gap. Boyce said Kerr was described by the CIA as "our man Kerr". Former ASIO chief Sir Edward Woodward has dismissed the notion of CIA involvement, as has journalist Paul Kelly.

Whitlam later wrote that Kerr did not need any encouragement from the CIA. However, he also said that in 1977 United States Deputy Secretary of State Warren Christopher made a special trip to Sydney to meet with him and told him, on behalf of President Jimmy Carter, of his willingness to work with whatever government Australians elected, and that the US would never again interfere with Australia's democratic processes.

== Return to Opposition, 1975–1978 ==
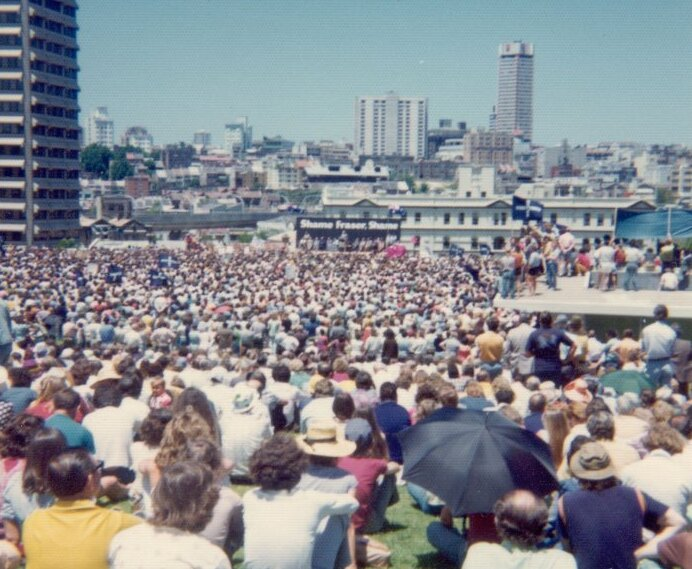
A huge ALP rally overspills The Domain in Sydney, 24 November 1975.

As the ALP began the 1975 campaign, it seemed that its supporters would maintain their rage. Early rallies drew huge crowds, with attendees handing Whitlam money to pay election expenses. The crowds greatly exceeded those in any of Whitlam's earlier campaigns; in The Domain, Sydney, 30,000 people gathered for an ALP rally below a banner: "Shame Fraser Shame". Fraser's appearances drew protests, and a letter bomb sent to Kerr was defused by authorities. Instead of making a policy speech to keynote his campaign, Whitlam made a speech attacking his opponents and calling 11 November "a day which will live in infamy".

Polls from the first week of campaigning showed a nine-point swing against Labor, which would have cost the party many seats if repeated at an election. Whitlam's campaign team disbelieved the results at first, but additional polling returns clearly showed that the electorate had turned against Labor. The Coalition attacked Labor for economic conditions, and released television commercials with the title "The Three Dark Years" showing images from Whitlam government scandals. The ALP campaign concentrated on the issue of Whitlam's dismissal and did not address the economy until its final days. By that time Fraser was confident of victory and content to sit back, avoid specifics and make no mistakes. In the election, the Coalition won the largest majority government in Australian history, winning 91 seats to Labor's 36. Labor suffered a 6.5 per cent swing against it and its caucus was cut almost in half, suffering a 30-seat swing. Labor was left with five fewer seats than it had when Whitlam took the leadership. The Coalition also won a 37–25 majority in the Senate.

Controversial cartoon of the Whitlams by Peter Nicholson

Whitlam stayed on as Opposition leader, surviving a leadership challenge. In early 1976, an additional controversy broke when it was reported that Whitlam had been involved in ALP attempts to raise $500,000 during the election from the Ahmed Hassan al-Bakr government of Iraq. No money had actually been paid, and no charges were filed. The Whitlams were visiting China at the time of the Tangshan earthquake in July 1976, though they were staying in Tianjin, 140 kilometres (90 mi) away from the epicentre. The Age printed a cartoon by Peter Nicholson showing the Whitlams huddled together in bed with Margaret Whitlam saying, "Did the earth move for you too, dear?" This cartoon prompted a page full of outraged letters from Labor partisans and a telegram from Gough Whitlam, safe in Tokyo, requesting the original of the cartoon.

In early 1977 Whitlam faced a leadership challenge from Bill Hayden, the last treasurer in the Whitlam government, but survived by a two-vote margin. Fraser called an election for 10 December to bring elections for the House and Senate back into line; a half-Senate election was due in 1978. Although Labor managed to pick up five seats, the Coalition still enjoyed a majority of 48. According to Freudenberg, "The meaning and the message were unmistakable. It was the Australian people's rejection of Edward Gough Whitlam." Whitlam's son Tony, who had joined his father in the House of Representatives at the 1975 election, was defeated. Shortly after the election, Whitlam resigned as party leader and was succeeded by Hayden.

== Later years and death, 1978–2014 ==
Whitlam was made a Companion of the Order of Australia in June 1978, and resigned from Parliament on 31 July of the same year. He then held various academic positions. When Labor returned to power under Bob Hawke in 1983, Whitlam was appointed as Australia's ambassador to UNESCO, based in Paris. He served for three years in this post, defending UNESCO against allegations of corruption. At the end of his term as ambassador Whitlam was elected to the executive board of UNESCO for a three-year term, until 1989. In 1985, he was appointed to Australia's Constitutional Commission.

Whitlam was appointed chairman of the National Gallery of Australia in 1987 after his son Nick, who was then managing director of the State Bank of New South Wales, turned down the position. He and Margaret Whitlam were part of the bid team that in 1993 persuaded the International Olympic Committee to award Sydney the 2000 Summer Olympics.

Sir John Kerr died in 1991. He and Whitlam never reconciled; indeed, Whitlam always saw his dismissal from office as a "constitutional coup d'état". Whitlam and Fraser became friends during the 1980s, though they never discussed the events of 1975. The two subsequently campaigned together in support of the 1999 Australian republic referendum. In March 2010, Fraser visited Whitlam at his Sydney office while on a book tour to promote his memoirs. Whitlam accepted an autographed copy of the book and presented Fraser with a copy of his 1979 book about the dismissal, The Truth of the Matter.

During the 1990s Labor government, Whitlam used the Australian Greens as a "decoy questioner" in parliament. According to Dee Margetts, Whitlam "didn't like what Keating and Hawke had done" and regularly sent the Greens questions to ask the government about policies he disagreed with.

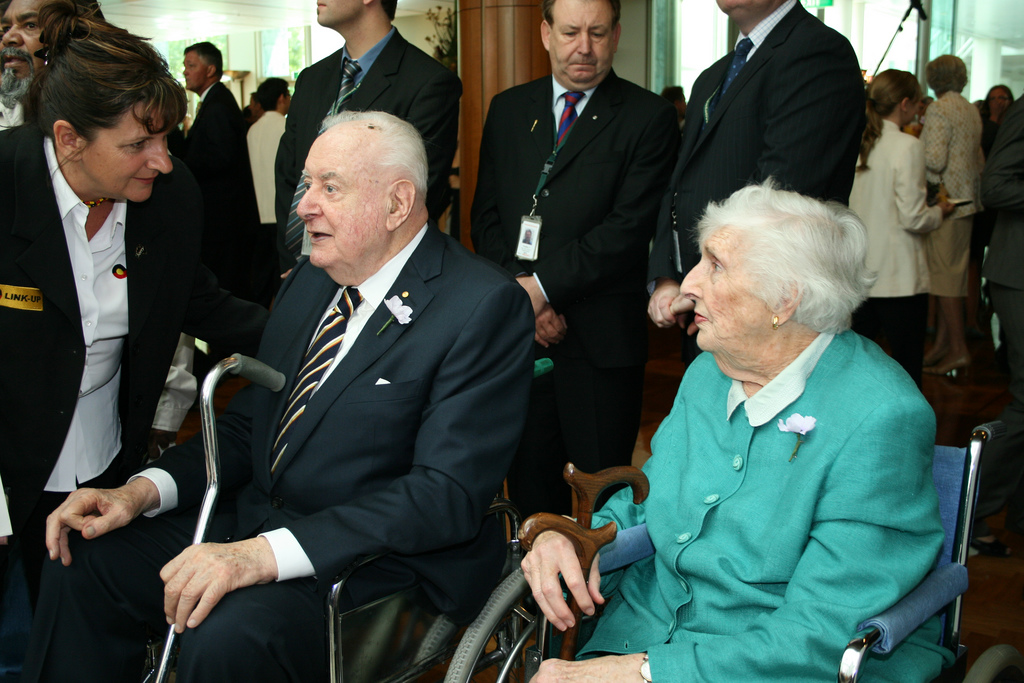
Gough Whitlam with wife Margaret at Parliament House for the national apology to the Stolen Generations in February 2008

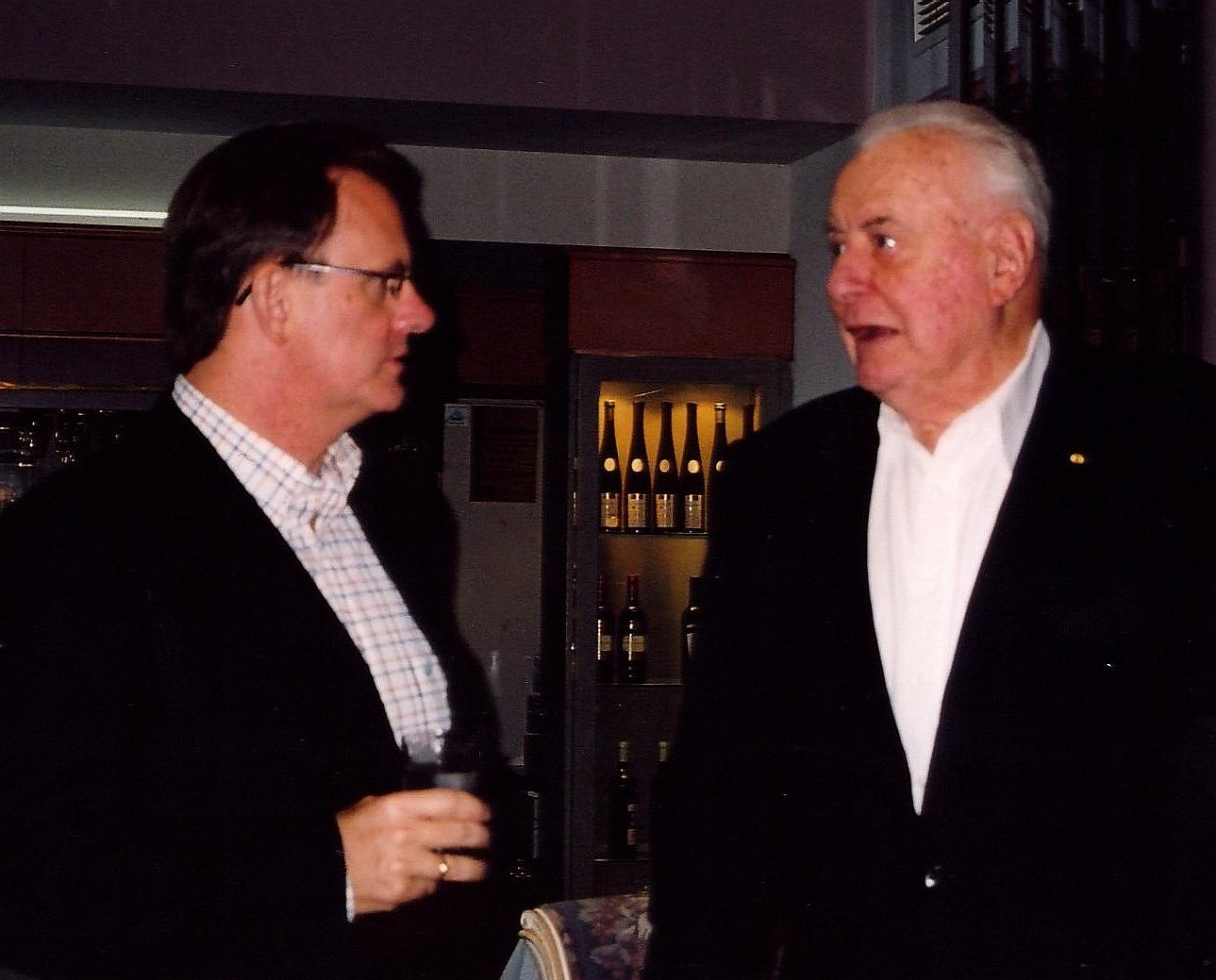
Gough Whitlam (right) at 88, with the then-leader of the Australian Labor Party, Mark Latham, at an election fundraising event in Melbourne, September 2004

Whitlam initially had a close relationship with Labor leader Mark Latham, who held his old seat of Werriwa. However, by 2005 he had called for Latham's resignation from parliament. Whitlam called his support of Latham to enter federal politics as one of his "lingering regrets".

Whitlam supported fixed four-year terms for both houses of Parliament. In 2006, he accused the ALP of failing to press for this change. In April 2007, he and Margaret Whitlam were both made life members of the Australian Labor Party. This was the first time anyone had been made a life member of the party organisation at the national level.

In 2007, Whitlam testified at an inquest into the death of Brian Peters, one of five Australia-based TV personnel killed in East Timor in October 1975. Whitlam indicated he had warned Peters' colleague, Greg Shackleton, who was also killed, that the Australian government could not protect them in East Timor and that they should not go there. He also said Shackleton was "culpable" if he had not passed on Whitlam's warning.

Whitlam joined three other former prime ministers in February 2008 in returning to Parliament to witness the Federal Government apology to the Aboriginal Stolen Generations by the then prime minister Kevin Rudd. On 21 January 2009, Whitlam achieved a greater age (92 years, 195 days) than any other Australian prime minister, surpassing the previous record holder Frank Forde. On the 60th anniversary of his marriage to Margaret Whitlam, he called it "very satisfactory" and claimed a record for "matrimonial endurance". In 2010, it was reported that Whitlam had moved into an aged care facility in Sydney's inner east in 2007. Despite this, he continued to go to his office three days a week. Margaret Whitlam remained in the couple's nearby apartment. In early 2012, she suffered a fall there, leading to her death in hospital at the age of 92 on 17 March of that year, a month short of the Whitlams' 70th wedding anniversary.

Whitlam died on the morning of 21 October 2014. His family announced that there would be a private cremation and a public memorial service. He was the longest-lived Australian prime minister, dying at the age of 98 years and 102 days. He predeceased his successor Malcolm Fraser by just under five months.

== Memorials ==
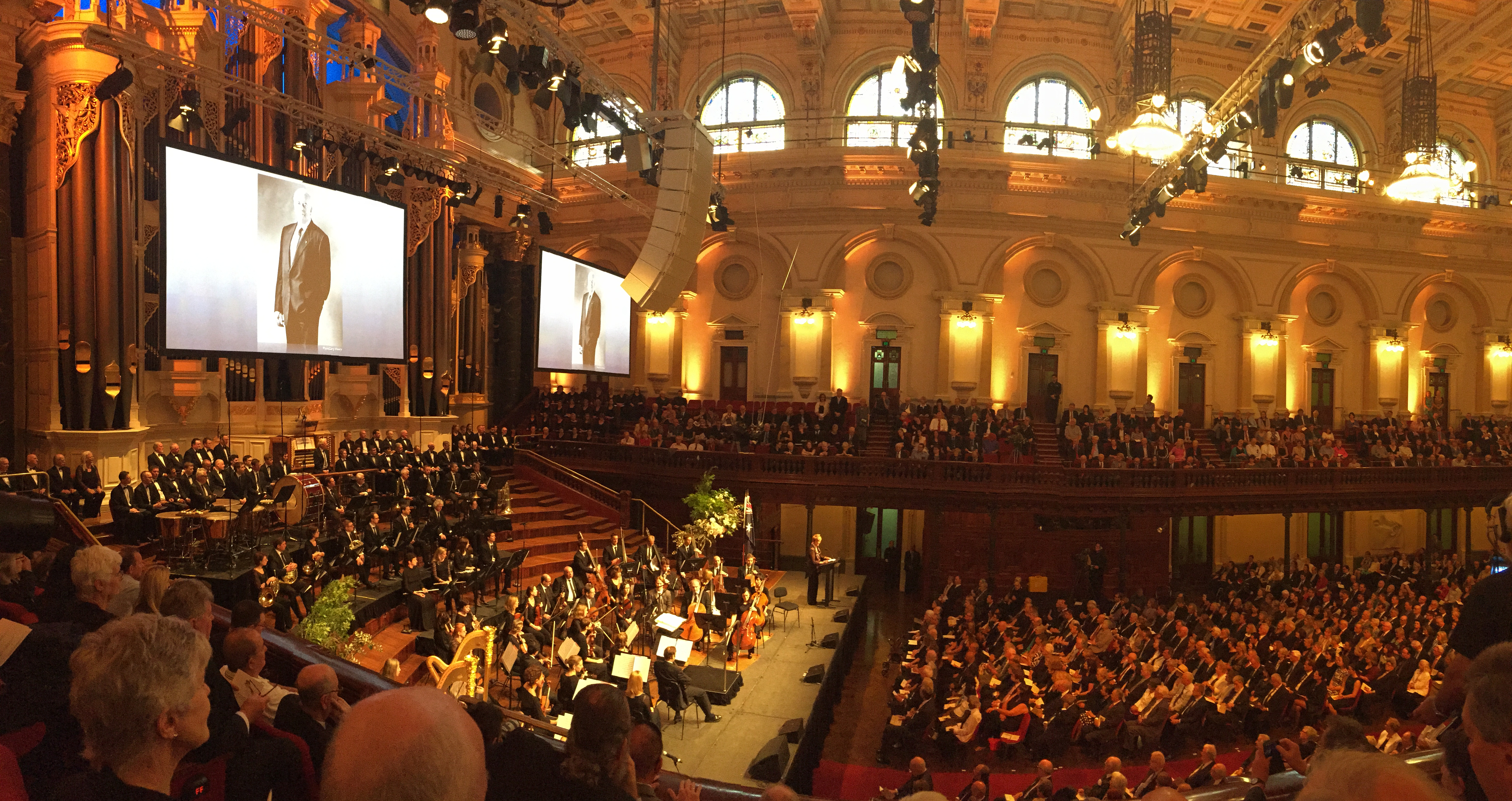
Memorial service, Sydney Town Hall, at welcome to country

A state memorial service was held on 5 November 2014 in the Sydney Town Hall and was led by Kerry O'Brien. The Welcome to Country was given by Auntie Millie Ingram and eulogies were delivered by Graham Freudenberg, Cate Blanchett, Noel Pearson, John Faulkner and Antony Whitlam. Pearson's contribution was hailed as "one of the best political speeches of our time". Musical performances were delivered by William Barton (a didgeridoo improvisation), Paul Kelly and Kev Carmody (their land rights protest song From Little Things Big Things Grow), as well as the Sydney Philharmonia Choir and the Sydney Symphony Orchestra, conducted by Benjamin Northey. In accordance with Whitlam's wishes, the orchestra performed "In Tears of Grief" from Bach's St Matthew Passion, "Va, pensiero" from Verdi's Nabucco, "Un Bal" from Symphonie fantastique by Berlioz and, as the final piece, Jerusalem by Parry. Jerusalem was followed by a flypast of four RAAF F/A-18 Hornets in missing man formation. Those attending the memorial included the current and some former governors-general, the current and all living former prime ministers, and members of the family of Vincent Lingiari. The two-hour service, attended by 1,000 invited guests and 900 others, was screened to thousands outside the Hall, as well as in Cabramatta and Melbourne, and broadcast live by ABC television.

In honour of Whitlam, the Australian Electoral Commission created the Division of Whitlam in the House of Representatives in place of the Division of Throsby, with effect from the 2016 election. ACT Chief Minister Katy Gallagher announced that a future Canberra suburb will be named for Whitlam, and that his family would be consulted about other potential memorials. Gough Whitlam Park in Earlwood, New South Wales, is named after him.

In January 2021, the Whitlams' purpose-built home from 1956 to 1978 at 32 Albert Street, Cabramatta, designed by architect Roy Higson Dell Appleton, came up for sale. It was eventually sold at for $1.15 million to a group of Labor supporters, including former NSW Premier Barrie Unsworth, with the intention of restoring the house as a museum. The work is supported by a Commonwealth government national heritage grant of $1.3 million, and is to be managed by the Whitlam Institute of Western Sydney University. The house was as of November 2021 proposed to be listed as a local heritage item. Following renovations and restoration works, the "Whitlam Prime Ministerial Home" was officially opened by Prime Minister Anthony Albanese on 2 December 2022.

== Legacy and historical evaluation ==
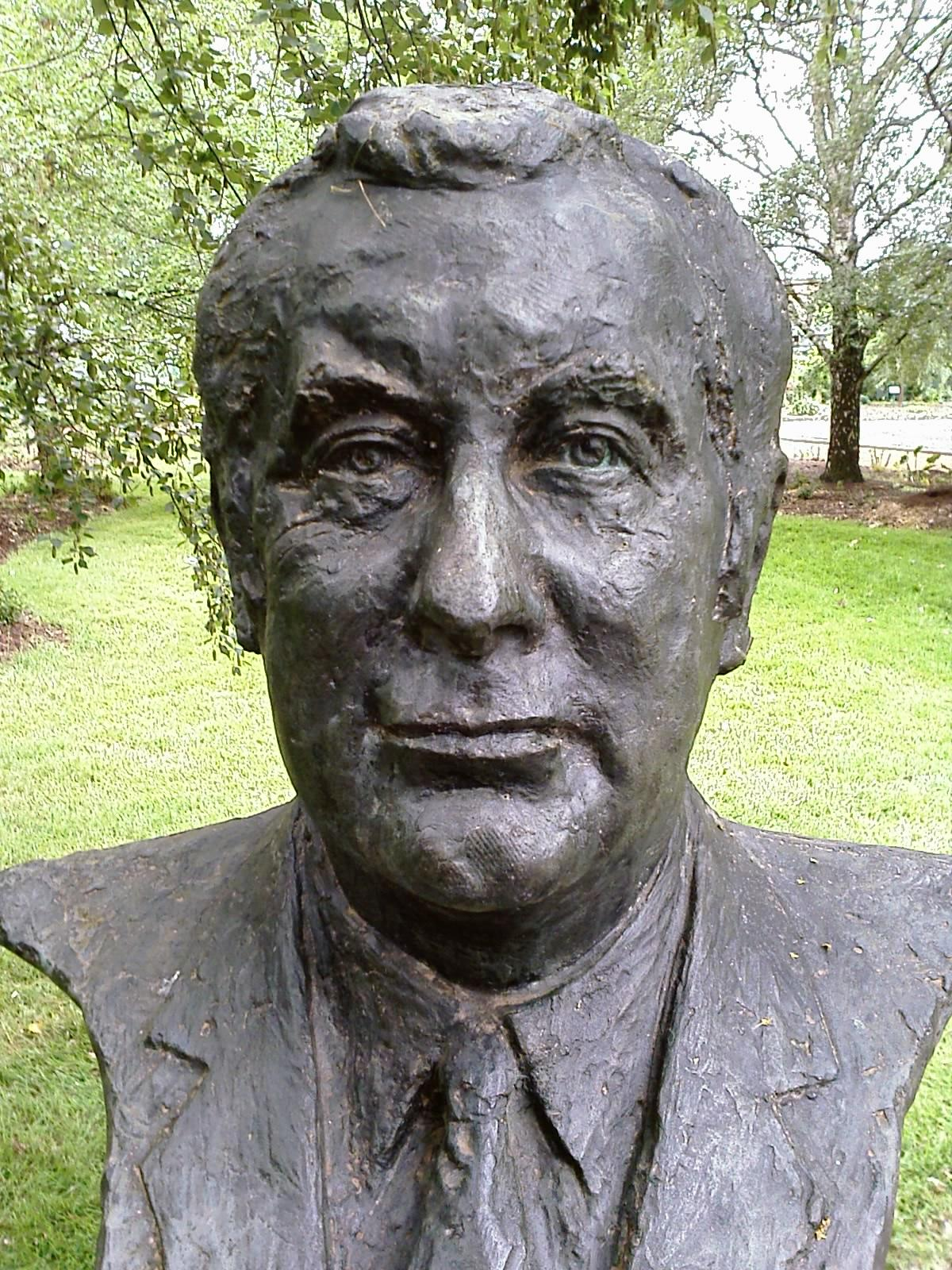
Bust of Gough Whitlam by sculptor Victor Greenhalgh, in the Prime Ministers Avenue in the Ballarat Botanical Gardens

Whitlam is remembered for the circumstances of his dismissal. It is a legacy he did little to efface; he wrote a 1979 book, The Truth of the Matter (the title is a play on Kerr's 1978 memoir Matters for Judgment), and devoted part of his subsequent book, Abiding Interests, to his removal. According to journalist and author Paul Kelly, who wrote two books on the crisis, Whitlam "achieved a paradoxical triumph: the shadow of the dismissal has obscured the sins of his government".

More books have been written about Whitlam, including his own writings, than about any other Australian prime minister. The most recent and comprehensive biography of Whitlam was published in October 2025, authored by Troy Bramston, a journalist for The Australian and a political historian. Bramston was the first biographer to have full access to all of Whitlam's personal papers and wrote the first biography since his death. Among the revelations in the book were that Whitlam was not baptised into the Anglican Church; that his mother decided he would go by his second name, "Gough", to avoid "Edward" being shortened to "Ned" and likened to Ned Kelly; that he was advised by public servants that Tirath Khemlani was a con-man and knew that Rex Connor was continuing to deal with him after his authority had been revoked; that he was repeatedly advised by public servants he was at risk of dismissal and considered recalling John Kerr as governor-general during the supply crisis; and that after his death in 2014, Whitlam's ashes were partly scattered at Marks Park in Tamarama.

According to Whitlam biographer Jenny Hocking, for a period of at least a decade, the Whitlam era was viewed almost entirely negatively, but that has changed. Still, she feels Australians take for granted programs and policies initiated by the Whitlam government, such as recognition of China, legal aid, and Medicare. Ross McMullin, who wrote an official history of the ALP, notes that Whitlam remains greatly admired by many Labor supporters because of his reform efforts and inspiring leadership. Some rankings have put Whitlam high on the list of Australia's better prime ministers. Economist and writer Ross Gittins evaluates opinions on the Whitlam government's responses to the economic challenges of the time:

What Labor's True Believers don't want to accept is that the inexperience, impatience and indiscipline with which the Whitlam government changed Australia forever, and for the better, cost a lot of ordinary workers their jobs. Many would have spent months, even a year or more without employment.

But what the Whitlam haters forget is that Labor had the misfortune to inherit government just as all the developed economies were about to cross a fault-line dividing the post-war Golden Age of automatic growth and full employment from today's world of always high unemployment and obsession with economic stabilisation.

Wallace Brown describes Whitlam in his book about his experiences covering Australian prime ministers as a journalist:

Whitlam was the most paradoxical of all Prime Ministers in the last half of the 20th century. A man of superb intellect, knowledge, and literacy, he yet had little ability when it came to economics. ... Whitlam rivalled Menzies in his passion for the House of Representatives and ability to use it as his stage, and yet his parliamentary skills were rhetorical and not tactical. He could devise a strategy and then often botch the tactics in trying to implement that strategy. ... Above all he was a man of grand vision with serious blind spots.

Despite being in office for only three years, Whitlam's government succeeded in carrying out a radical program of social reform during that period. As noted by Tom Bramble and Rick Kuhn (2011):

If many Labor supporters regard the Curtin and Chifley governments as a period of great achievements and greater ambitions frustrated by conservative forces, their illusions in the Whitlam government are even more heroic. After nearly a quarter of a century of stagnant conservative rule during which Australia seemed to be a backward looking outpost of the British empire run by monarchists and reactionaries, Gough Whitlam, the Mighty Gough, broke through and during his first 12 months in office remade Australia forever.

Whitlam's last words in the documentary film Gough Whitlam – In His Own Words (2002) were in response to a question about his status as an icon and elder statesman. He said:

I hope this is not just because I was a martyr; the fact was, I was an achiever.

== Published works ==
- On Australia's Constitution (Melbourne: Widescope, 1977).
- The Truth of the Matter (Melbourne: Melbourne University Press, 1979).
- The Whitlam Government (Ringwood: Viking, 1985).
- Abiding Interests (Brisbane: University of Queensland Press, 1997).
- My Italian Notebook: The Story of an Enduring Love Affair (Sydney: Allen & Unwin, 2002)

== See also ==
- The Hon E.G. Whitlam, painting by Clifton Pugh
- Whitlam government
- First Whitlam Ministry
- Second Whitlam Ministry
- Third Whitlam Ministry

== Notes ==
Parliament of Australia
Preceded by Bert Lazzarini	Member for Werriwa; 1952–1978	Succeeded by John Kerin
Political offices
Preceded by Arthur Calwell	Deputy Leader of the Opposition of Australia; 1960–1967	Succeeded by Lance Barnard
Preceded by Arthur Calwell	Leader of the Opposition of Australia; 1967–1972	Succeeded by Billy Snedden
Preceded by William McMahon	Prime Minister of Australia; 1972–1975	Succeeded by Malcolm Fraser
Preceded by Nigel Bowen	Minister for Foreign Affairs; 1972–1973	Succeeded by Don Willesee
Preceded by Billy Snedden	Treasurer of Australia; 1972	Succeeded by Frank Crean
Preceded by Ivor Greenwood	Attorney-General of Australia; 1972	Succeeded by Lionel Murphy
Preceded by Don Chipp	Minister for Customs and Excise; 1972	Succeeded by Lionel Murphy
Preceded by Doug Anthony	Minister for Trade and Industry; 1972	Succeeded by Jim Cairns as Minister for Overseas Trade
Preceded by Doug Anthony	Minister for Trade and Industry; 1972	Succeeded by Jim Cairns as Minister for Secondary Industry
Preceded by Peter Nixon	Minister for Shipping and Transport; 1972	Succeeded by Bob Brown as Minister for Land Transport and Shipping Support
Preceded by Malcolm Fraser as Acting Minister for Education and Science	Minister for Education and Science; 1972	Succeeded by Kim Beazley Sr. as Minister for Education
Preceded by Malcolm Fraser as Acting Minister for Education and Science	Minister for Education and Science; 1972	Succeeded by Bill Morrison as Minister for Science
Preceded by Bob Cotton	Minister for Civil Aviation; 1972	Succeeded by Charles Jones
Preceded by Kevin Cairns	Minister for Housing; 1972	Succeeded by Les Johnson
Preceded by Reg Wright	Minister for Works; 1972	Succeeded by Jim Cavanagh
Preceded by Andrew Peacock	Minister for External Territories; 1972	Succeeded by Bill Morrison
Preceded by Peter Howson	Minister for the Environment, Aborigines and the Arts; 1972	Succeeded by Moss Cass as Minister for the Environment and Conservation
Preceded by Peter Howson	Minister for the Environment, Aborigines and the Arts; 1972	Succeeded by Gordon Bryant as Minister for Aboriginal Affairs
Preceded by Peter Howson	Minister for the Environment, Aborigines and the Arts; 1972	Succeeded by Tony Staley as Minister assisting the Prime Minister in matters concerning the Arts
Preceded by Jim Cairns	Minister for the Environment; 1975	Succeeded by Joe Berinson
Preceded by Malcolm Fraser	Leader of the Opposition of Australia; 1976–1977	Succeeded by Bill Hayden
Preceded by Andrew Peacock as Opposition Spokesperson for Foreign Affairs and External Territories	Opposition Spokesperson on Foreign Affairs; 1976–1977	Succeeded by Ken Wriedt
New office	Opposition Spokesperson on Arts; 1976–1977	Succeeded by Susan Ryan as Opposition Spokesperson on Arts and Letters
Party political offices
Preceded by Arthur Calwell	Deputy Leader of the Australian Labor Party; 1960–1967	Succeeded by Lance Barnard
Preceded by Arthur Calwell	Leader of the Australian Labor Party; 1967–1977	Succeeded by Bill Hayden
Diplomatic posts
Preceded by Owen Harries	Permanent Delegate of Australia to UNESCO; 1983–1986	Succeeded by Charles Mott
