= National Sewerage Program =

Australian federal government project

- Type of project: Public works
- Country: Australia
- Prime Minister(s): Hon. Gough Whitlam AC QC; Rt Hon. Malcolm Fraser AC QC GCL
- Ministry: Department of Urban and Regional Development (1972-75); Department of Environment, Housing and Community Development (1975-77)
- Key people: Tom Uren
- Launched: 1972; 54 years ago
- Closed: 30 August 1977; 48 years ago
- Budget: AUD$330 million
- Status: Closed

The National Sewerage Program was an Australian federal program under the Whitlam government established to provide funding for the expansion of municipal sewerage systems. At the time Australia was lagging behind other developed nations and it was later estimated that, as of the commencement of the program in 1972, 17.2% of the Australian population were not connected to sewerage. Even in major population centers like Sydney and Melbourne, there was a backlog of over 318,000 homes waiting to be connected to municipal sewerage systems. The program was administered by the newly formed Department of Urban and Regional Development, and over AUD$330 million of funding was allocated to be distributed to individual states and territories over ten years. Over the life of the program the sewerage connection backlog was reduced by 30% to 40%. The program was abolished in 1977 by the incumbent Fraser government. Consequently, many communities struggled to connect to sewerage for decades afterwards.
