= Loans affair =

1975 Australian political scandal

The Loans affair, also called the Khemlani affair, was a political scandal involving the Whitlam government of Australia in 1975 in which it was accused of attempting to borrow money from the Middle East by the agency of the Pakistani banker Tirath Khemlani (17 September 1920 — 19 May 1991) and thus bypass the standard procedures of the Australian Treasury and violate the Australian Constitution.

Minerals and Energy Minister Rex Connor and Treasurer and Deputy Prime Minister Jim Cairns misled Parliament and were forced from the Whitlam Cabinet over the affair. This was a key precursor to the 1975 Australian constitutional crisis, which led to the dismissal of the government in 1975.

== Background ==
Minerals and Energy Minister Rex Connor wanted funds for a series of national development projects. He proposed that to finance his plans, the government should borrow US$4 billion: equivalent to US$25 billion in 2024.

It was a requirement of the Australian Constitution for non-temporary government borrowings to be through the Loan Council. Although the development projects were long-term, Whitlam, Cairns, Murphy and Connor (who were part of the Federal Executive Council) authorised Connor to seek the loan on 13 December 1974 without involving the Loan Council. However, the Executive Council controversially described the loan as for "temporary purposes", which enabled it to bypass Loan Council approval, despite the fact that the proceeds were intended to be used for large projects and to secure Australian ownership and control of its mineral and energy resources.

Connor had already been investigating the loan. Through an Adelaide businessman named Gerry Karidis, he had been introduced to the Pakistani London-based commodities trader named Tirath Khemlani. According to Khemlani, Connor asked for a 20-year loan with interest at 7.7% and set a commission to Khemlani of 2.5%. Khemlani repeatedly refused to disclose the identities of the lenders.

Responding to pressure from the Reserve Bank of Australia and the US Federal Reserve, Khemlani claimed that the lenders were four separate emirates and the money was being held in nine prime European banks, with the Union Bank of Switzerland acting as the "post office" from which money was to be collected. Despite assurance that all was in order, Khemlani began to stall on the loan, notably after he was asked to go to Zürich with officials of the Reserve Bank of Australia to prove that the funds were in the Union Bank of Switzerland, as he had claimed. The Union Bank of Switzerland had no records whatsoever of any such loan.

The Executive Council revised its authority to Connor to $2 billion on 28 January 1975, after revoking the earlier authority to seek $4 billion in loans. The terms of the loan were revised, with interest at 8.35% instead of 7.7% and no commission to be paid. The repayment of the loan would be secured by promissory notes, payable 20 years from the date of receipt of funds.

Khemlani played a pivotal role and was employed by Dalamal and Sons, a London-based commodity-trading firm.

It was common knowledge that funds were usually borrowed from European banks or financiers. Connor's attempt to secure the loan was unusual for several reasons:

1. The size of the loan was extremely large for the time.
2. When a project of such a scale and cost is undertaken, governments often attract foreign investment and ultimately form a business partnership whereby the foreign investor retains partial ownership and/or rights over the resources once the project is complete. However, that option was rejected by Connor, who was renowned for his desire to have Australian resources controlled and owned by Australians.
3. The Minister for Minerals and Energy was raising the loan independently of the Treasury. Treasury was highly suspicious of the loan, given the size of the loan, the low interest, the high amount of commission to be paid to Kehmlani and his associates, the unknown status of the commission agents, and the refusal to disclose the identities of the lenders.
4. Treasury received advice from the Bank of England that the loan was "funny money" and that the proceeds were simply not available. The Bank advised that intermediaries similar to Khemlani typically inject similar deals with secrecy and urgency with a view to quickly obtaining a written commitment from the prospective borrower. Once the borrower realises their error, they attempt to back out of the agreement meaning that the prospective lender is legally entitlted to claim commission even if they do not need to produce any funds.
5. Khemlani's London-based company, Dalamal and Sons (Commodities) was a new company with capital of just £100.
6. Rather than attempting to raise the loan from US financiers, Connor attempted to raise the loan from Middle-Eastern financiers, with Khemlani acting as the intermediary. There were unconfirmed reports that Middle-Eastern financiers offered lower interest rates on governmental loans than US banks and financiers. The Middle East at the time was awash with petrodollars since the price of oil quadrupled between 1973 and 1974.

Connor was duly authorised to raise loans through Khemlani in late 1974. Between December 1974 and May 1975, Khemlani sent regular telexes to Connor that advised that he was close to securing the loan.

However, the loan never eventuated. In May 1975, Whitlam sought to secure the loan instead through a major US investment bank. As part of the loan procedure, the bank imposed an obligation on the Australian government to cease all other loan-raising activities pertaining to this loan. Accordingly, on 20 May 1975, Connor's loan-raising authority was formally revoked.

== Leak of loan proposal ==
As news leaked of the plan, the opposition began questioning the government. Under questioning from Fraser, Whitlam said on 20 May that the loans pertained to "matters of energy", that the Loans Council had not been advised and that it would be advised only "if and when the loan is made". The following day, he told Fraser and Parliament that authority for the plan had been revoked. On 4 June 1975, Treasurer and Deputy Prime Minister Jim Cairns, misled Parliament by claiming that he had not given a letter to an intermediary offering a 2.5% commission on a loan. Whitlam demoted Cairns to Minister for the Environment and later dismissed him from Cabinet altogether.

A special one-day sitting of the House of Representatives was held on 9 July 1975 during which Prime Minister Gough Whitlam tabled the documents containing evidence about the loan and attempted to defend his government's actions.

Beset by economic difficulties at the time and by the negative political impact conjured up by the affair, the Whitlam government was vulnerable to further assaults on its credibility.

Although Connor's authority to seek an overseas loan was withdrawn after the leaking of the scandal, he continued to liaise with Khemlani. The journalist Peter Game, of the Melbourne daily newspaper The Herald, tracked down Khemlani in mid-late 1975 and following an interview revealed that Khemlani and Connor were still in contact, which brought the affair to a head. After Connor directly denied Khemlani's version of events, as reported in the Sydney Morning Herald, Khemlani flew to Australia in October 1975 and provided Game with telexes sent to him from Connor that refuted Connor's denial.

On 13 October 1975, Khemlani provided a statutory declaration and a copy of the incriminating telexes sent from Connor's office, a copy of which was forwarded to Whitlam. Upon receiving the documents, Whitlam sacked Connor from Cabinet for misleading Parliament. In his letter of dismissal, dated 14 October 1975, Whitlam wrote, "Yesterday I received from solicitors a copy of a statutory declaration signed by Mr Khemlani and copies of a number of telex messages between Mr Khemlani’s office in London and the office of the Minister for Energy. In my judgment these messages did constitute 'communications of substance' between the Minister and Mr Khemlani". Connor was replaced as Minister for Minerals and Energy by the Minister for Agriculture, Ken Wriedt.

== Aftermath ==
The affair embarrassed the Whitlam government and exposed it to claims of impropriety. Malcolm Fraser led the opposition, which used its majority in the Senate to block the government's budget legislation, thereby attempting to force an early general election by citing the loans affair as an example of ‘extraordinary and reprehensible’ circumstances.

Fraser told Parliament that the government was incompetent and the opposition Liberal-Country Party Coalition delayed passage of the government's money bills in the Senate with the intention of forcing the government to an election. Whitlam refused to call an election. The deadlock came to an end when Whitlam was dismissed by the Governor General, Sir John Kerr, on 11 November 1975 and Fraser was installed as caretaker prime minister pending an election. At the general election held in December 1975, Fraser led the Coalition to a landslide victory.

== In popular culture ==
The Loans Affair was dramatised in the 1983 Ten Network mini-series The Dismissal.

== See also ==
- List of Australian political controversies
- Māori loan affair in New Zealand; 1986–87
- William Archer Gunn
