= 2004 Australian House of Representatives election =

House of Representatives elections, 2004
- 9 October 2004
- All 150 seats in the Australian House of Representatives; 76 seats needed for a majority
- Turnout: 94.3%
Party	Leader	Vote %	Seats	+/–
Liberal	John Howard	40.5%	74	+6
Labor	Mark Latham	37.6%	60	−5
National	John Anderson	5.9%	12	−1
Country Liberal	Terry Mills	0.3%	1	0
This lists parties that won seats. See the complete results below.
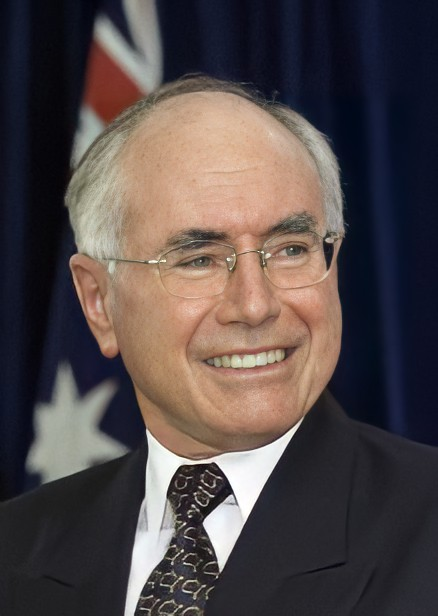

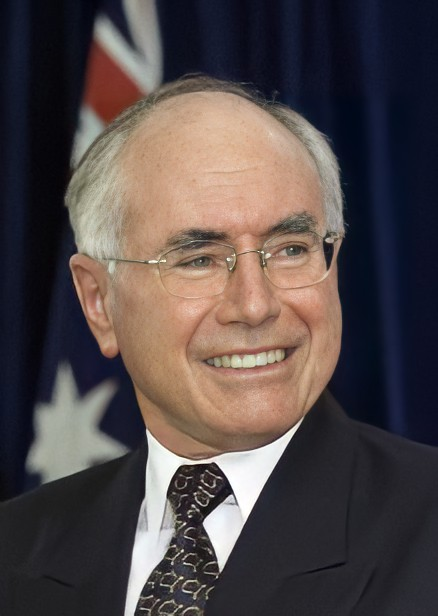
Prime Minister before	Prime Minister after
John Howard; Coalition	John Howard; Coalition

The 2004 Australian federal election was held on Saturday 9 October 2004 and it was the Howard government's opportunity to secure its fourth term of government. The Government consisting of the conservative coalition Liberal Party and National Party headed by John Howard and John Anderson respectively were opposed by Mark Latham and the Labor Party.

The Howard government would be returned for its fourth term, seeing major gains nationwide. It was able to increase its majority by 10 seats, from 14 to 24, and a secured an increased margin in seats it already held. The Coalition finished the election with 87 seats, to Labor's 60. The remaining seats were held by independents.

The election post-mortem would reveal that there had been a large miscalculation by the Australian Labor Party, pollsters, and media alike. What was predicted to be a close election, possibly even a Labor win by many, resulted in a win for the Coalition and a decline in the primary vote for the Labor Party.

The following table shows results for the Australian House of Representatives at the 2004 federal election, Coalition 87, Australian Labor Party 60, with three independents.

== Lead up to the election ==
In 2001, John Howard's Coalition government narrowly beat the Labor Party in what was deemed by many as an "unwinnable" election for the government. Issues of national security such as the September 11 terrorist attacks and the Tampa refugee crisis, allowed the government to turn its political fortunes around and secure a gain of two seats in the House of Representatives. The years following 2001 saw Australia controversially engage in the Iraq War as a member of the ‘Coalition of the Willing’ along with the United States and United Kingdom. This war was seen by many globally as a failure and it was predicted that the Howard government could be defeated due to the war's unpopularity. Another western democracy, Spain, had seen its pro-Iraq war government defeated in an election earlier that year and it was speculated that the Australian government might suffer the same fate.

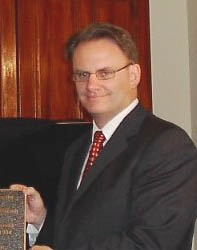
Leader of the opposition: Mark Latham

On the 29th of August 2004, the prime minister announced that a federal election would be held on October 9, 2004. This was an unusual time to announce an election, many thought the ongoing Athens Olympic Games gathering most of the public's attention. It was also an unusually long election campaign at 6 weeks. Many pundits predicted a tight race with Michelle Grattan stating on the day of the announcement that the campaign would be "an unpredictable and exciting election in which neither leader starts with a decisive break, either could take the prize, and absolutely anything could happen in between". However, the Government was campaigning from a strong position politically.

Despite the poignancy of the Iraq War as an issue, issues surrounding the economy such as interest rates, the size of the deficit, taxation and unemployment dominated the political agenda during the election campaign. The sale of Telstra was also an influential topic. The Howard government had delivered several budget surpluses and Australian's were enjoying a period of strong economic growth and low unemployment. The government afforded many tax breaks and concessions to middle-income earners, which despite not being revolutionary policy, bought them favour with large sections of the electorate. Add to this that the Labor Party had found itself in the political wilderness since 2001, spending much of its time between 2001 and 2004 under Simon Crean who suffered consistently poor polling, and the Howard government looked as though it had a strong grip on power. Labor eventually switched leaders in early 2004 to allow itself a better chance at the election. Crean resigned to allow Mark Latham to assume the position of leader in 2003 in a contested ballot against Kim Beazley.

== Redistributions in the Lower House ==
Victoria

In 2002-03 there was a significant redistribution of two Victorian seats. The electorate of McMillan, a marginal Labor electorate was redistributed to become a nominally Liberal seat. The electorate of Gippsland, a seat seen as a fairly safe for the National Party was redistributed to become more marginal.

South Australia

In 2003, the Australian Electoral Commission determined that South Australia would lose a seat and Queensland would gain a seat. It was decided that the electorate of Bonython would be absorbed into the electorate of Wakefield, drastically changing the demographics of this electorate in the process. It was unknown what the change would yield in terms of election results.

Queensland

Queensland's rising population saw it become entitled to an additional seat. This new seat would come in the form of an Eastern Brisbane electorate, Bonner. Bonner was a nominally Liberal electorate that took territory from the electorate of Bowman, a Labor seat. This redistribution would see the seat become nominally Liberal.

== Australia ==
House of Representatives (IRV) — Turnout 94.69% (CV) — Informal 5.18%
Party	Votes	%	Swing	Seats	Change
Liberal	4,741,458	40.47	+3.39	74	▲6
National	690,275	5.89	+0.28	12	▼1
Country Liberal	39,855	0.34	+0.02	1	Steady
Liberal–National coalition	5,471,588	46.71	+3.79	87	▲5
Labor	4,409,117	37.64	–0.20	60	▼5 (Note: Stephen Martin (Labor) had won the seat of Cunningham at the 2001 election; however, he retired in 2002. Michael Organ (Greens) won the seat at the resulting by-election; however, Sharon Bird regained the seat for Labor at this election.)
Greens	841,734	7.19	+2.23	0	Steady
Family First	235,315	2.01	+2.01		
Democrats	144,832	1.24	–4.17		
One Nation	139,956	1.19	–3.15		
Christian Democrats	72,241	0.62	+0.02		
Citizens Electoral Council	42,349	0.36	+0.20		
Socialist Alliance	14,155	0.12	+0.12		
New Country	9,439	0.08	+0.08		
Liberals for Forests	8,165	0.07	–0.07		
No GST	7,802	0.07	–0.05		
Ex-Service, Service and Veterans	4,369	0.04	+0.04		
Progressive Labour	3,775	0.03	–0.01		
Outdoor Recreation	3,505	0.03	+0.03		
Save the ADI Site	3,490	0.03	–0.02		
Great Australians	2,824	0.02	+0.02		
Fishing Party	2,516	0.02	+0.01		
Lower Excise Fuel and Beer	2,007	0.02	–0.02		
Democratic Labor	1,372	0.01	+0.01		
Non-Custodial Parents	1,132	0.01	+0.00		
HEMP	787	0.01	–0.02		
Nuclear Disarmament	341	0.00	+0.00		
Aged and Disability Pensioners Party	285	0.00	+0.00		
Independents	292,036	2.49	–0.40	3 (Note: The independents were Peter Andren, Tony Windsor and Bob Katter.)	Steady
Total	11,715,132			150	
Two-party-preferred vote
Coalition	6,179,130	52.74	+1.79	87	▲5
Labor	5,536,002	47.26	–1.79	60	▼5
Invalid/blank votes	639,851	5.18	+0.36		
Registered voters/turnout	13,098,461	94.32			
Source: Commonwealth Election 2004

== States ==
=== New South Wales ===
2004 Australian federal election (New South Wales)
- 9 October 2004

All 50 New South Wales seats in the Australian House of Representatives and 6 seats in the Australian Senate
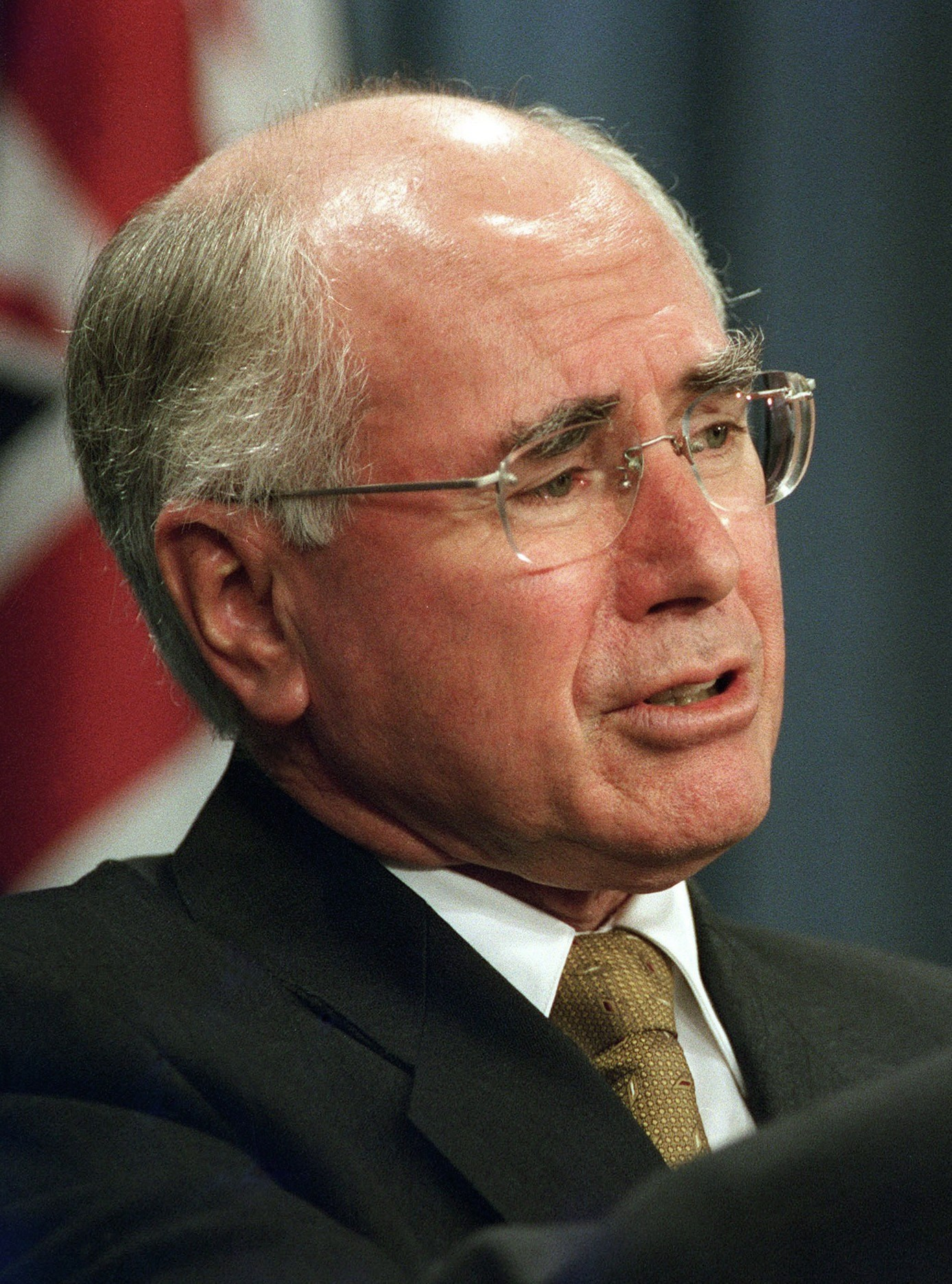

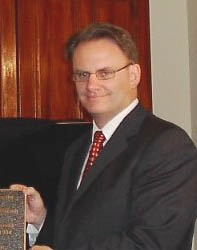

	First party	Second party	Third party
Leader	John Howard	Mark Latham	None
Party	Liberal/National coalition	Labor	Greens
Last election	28 seats	20 seats	0 seats
Seats before	28	19	1
Seats won	27	21	0
Seat change	▼1	▲2	▼1
Percentage	45.34%	36.70%	8.09%
Swing	▲2.55	▲0.25	▲3.34
TPP	51.93%	48.07%
TPP swing	▲0.27	▼0.27

Turnout 94.70% (CV) — Informal 6.12%
Party	Votes	%	Swing	Seats	Change
Liberal	1,391,511	36.16	+2.58	21	Steady
National	353,670	9.19	–0.03	6	▼1
Liberal–National coalition	1,745,181	45.34	+2.54	27	▼1
Labor	1,412,418	36.70	+0.25	21	▲1
Greens	311,369	8.09	3.34	0	Steady
One Nation	53,881	1.40	-3.37		
Christian Democrats	47,132	1.22	0.00		
Democrats	41,072	1.07	-3.17		
Family First	29,621	0.77	0.77		
Citizens Electoral Council	11,500	0.30	0.15		
Liberals for Forests	8,165	0.21	0.21		
No GST	7,229	0.19	0.06		
Socialist Alliance	4,415	0.11	0.11		
Progressive Labour	3,775	0.10	-0.02		
Outdoor Recreation	3,505	0.09	0.09		
Save the ADI Site	3,490	0.09	-0.07		
Ex-Service, Service and Veterans	3,108	0.08	0.08		
New Country	2,824	0.07	0.07		
Fishing Party	2,516	0.07	0.05		
Lower Excise Fuel and Beer	2,007	0.05	-0.03		
Non-Custodial Parents	1,132	0.03	0.01		
Nuclear Disarmament	0,341	0.01	0.01		
Independents	154,013	4.00	-0.06	2	Steady
Total	4,099,501			50	
Two-party-preferred vote
Liberal/National Coalition	1,998,699	51.93	+0.27	27	▼1
Labor	1,849,995	48.07	–0.27	21	▲1
Invalid/blank votes	250,807	6.12	+0.25		
Registered voters/turnout	4,329,115	94.70			
Source: AEC Tally Room

Four seats changed hands in NSW during this election, with the Liberal Party experiencing a primary vote of 36.2%, one of its strongest tally's since the 1975 poll and at the expense of the Labor Party. The opposition lost ground in the outer suburbs of Sydney, areas which it once considered to be very strong for its vote. The Nationals' vote remained steady but the Greens' vote increased by 3.3%, the party's second best result in the state.

=== Victoria ===
2004 Australian federal election (Victoria)
- 9 October 2004

All 37 Victoria seats in the Australian House of Representatives and 6 seats in the Australian Senate
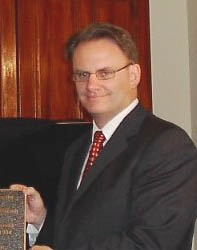

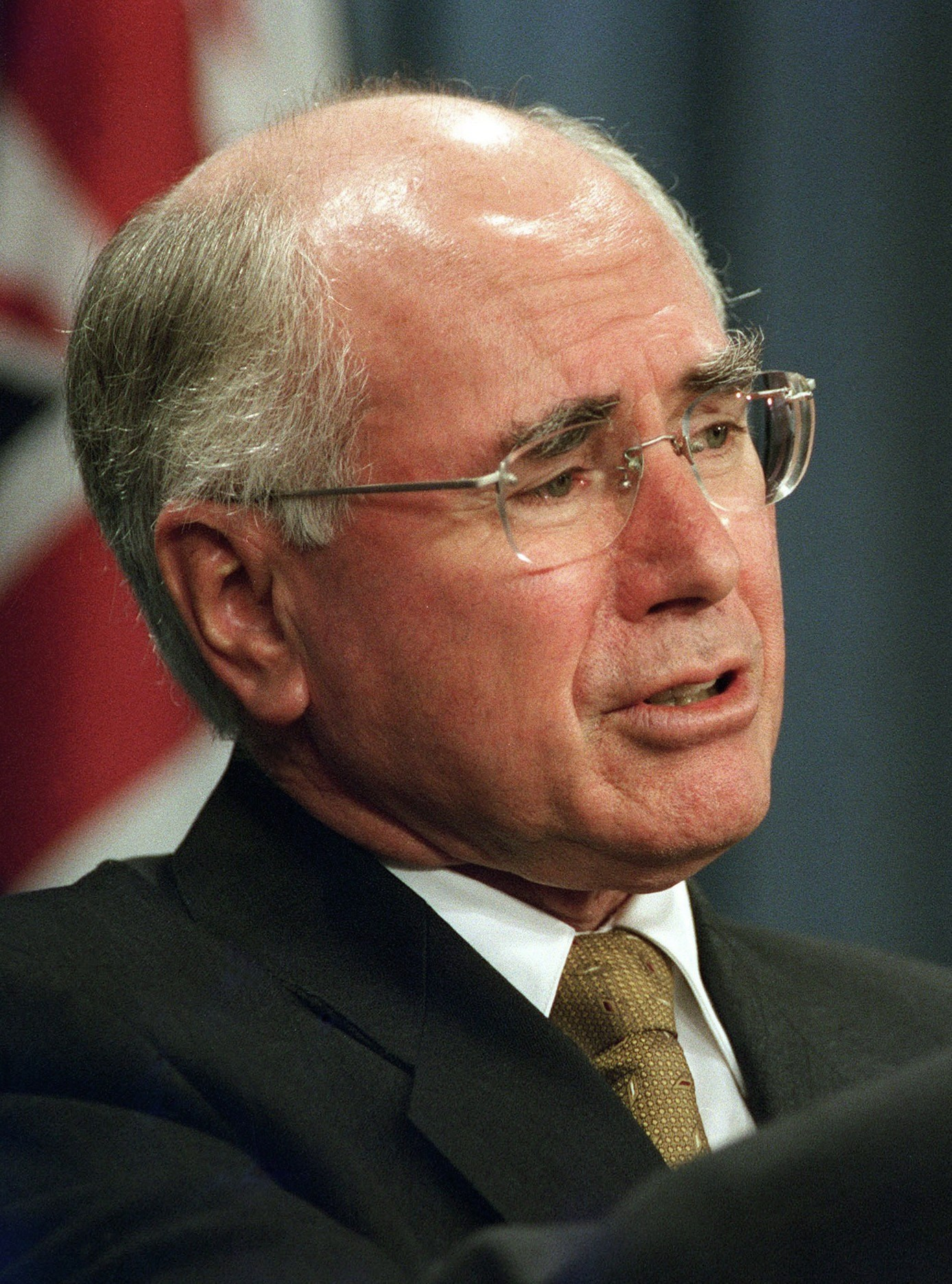
	First party	Second party
Leader	Mark Latham	John Howard
Party	Labor	Liberal/National coalition
Last election	19 seats	18 seats
Seats won	19 seats	18 seats
Seat change	Steady	Steady
Percentage	40.45%	46.75%
Swing	▲0.08	▲4.60
TPP	49.00%	51.00%
TPP swing	▼3.14	▲3.14

Turnout 94.84% (CV) — Informal 5.16%
Party	Votes	%	Swing	Seats	Change
Liberal	1,302,038	43.24	+4.17	16	Steady
National	105,557	3.51	+0.43	2	Steady
Liberal–National coalition	1,302,038	46.75	+4.60	18	Steady
Labor	1,217,921	40.45	–1.20	19	Steady
Greens	224,423	7.45	+1.55		
Family First	71,735	2.38	+2.38		
Democrats	32,363	1.07	–5.18		
Citizens Electoral Council	14,010	0.47	+0.24		
One Nation	4,119	0.14	–1.14		
Socialist Alliance	3,694	0.12	0.12		
Democratic Labor	1,372	0.05	0.05		
No GST	573	0.02	-0.15		
Ex-Service, Service and Veterans	527	0.02	0.02		
Christian Democrats	459	0.02	-0.19		
Aged and Disability Pensioners Party	285	0.01	0.01		
Independents	32,073	1.07	-0.99		
Total	3,139,881			37	
Two-party-preferred vote
Liberal/National Coalition	1,535,650	51.00	+3.14	18	Steady
Labor	1,475,519	49.00	–3.14	19	Steady
Invalid/blank votes	128,712	4.10	+0.12		
Registered voters/turnout	3,309,800	94.87			
Source: AEC Tally Room

Despite winning the most seats, Labor suffered its lowest primary vote share in the state since 1990. The Liberal Party performed strongly in Victoria recording their best results in the state since the election of 1954 with 43.2% of the primary vote. The Nationals and Greens vote held steady in the state, while the Australian Democrat vote fell sharply to 1.1%.

=== Queensland ===
2004 Australian federal election (Queensland)
- 9 October 2004

All 28 Queensland seats in the Australian House of Representatives and 6 seats in the Australian Senate
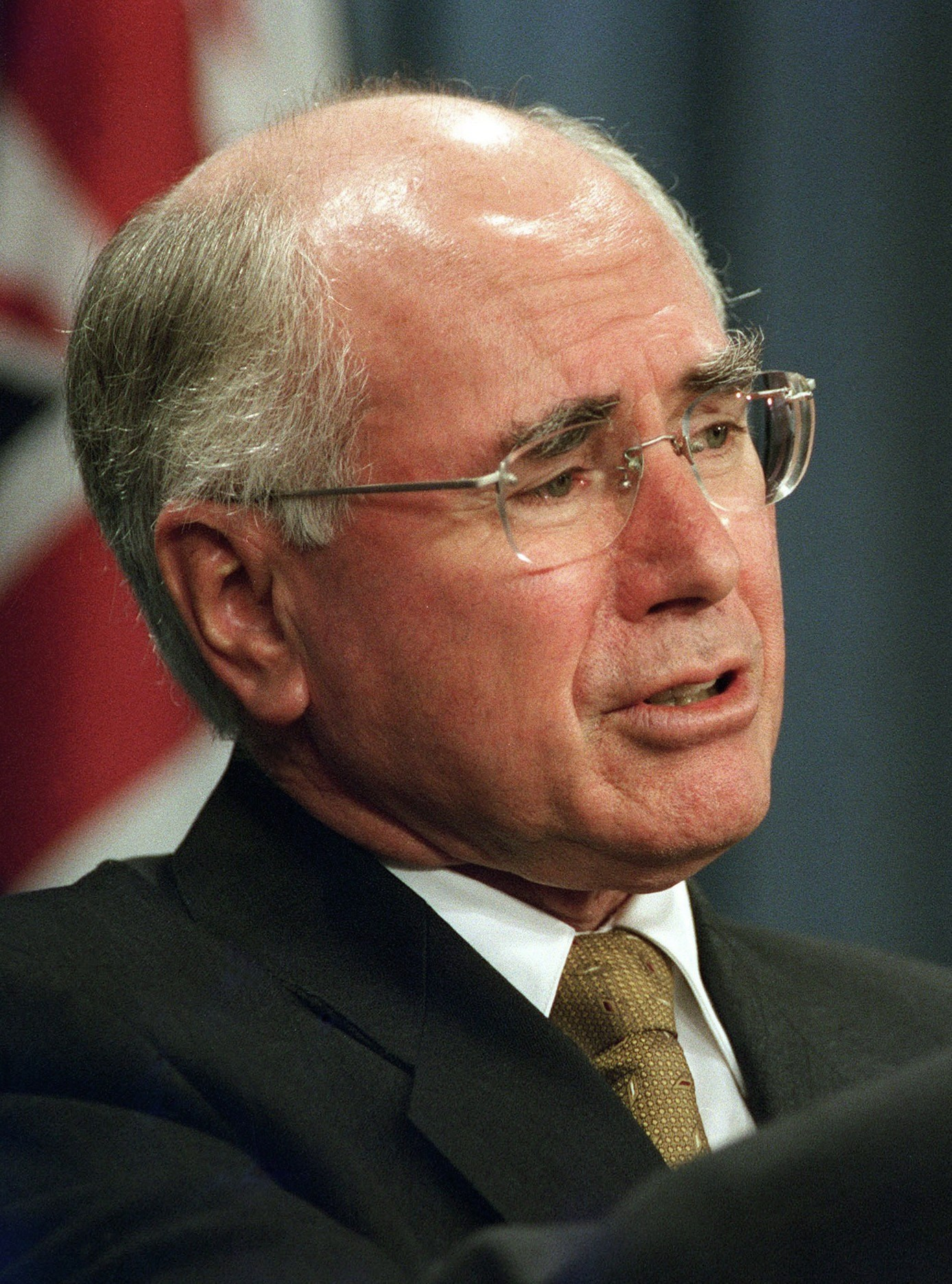

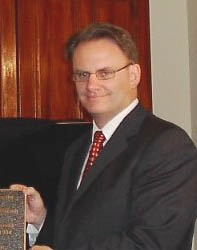
	First party	Second party
Leader	John Howard	Mark Latham
Party	Liberal/National coalition	Labor
Last election	20 seats	7 seats
Seats won	21 seats	6 seats
Seat change	▲1	▼1
Percentage	49.15%	34.75%
Swing	▲3.56	▲0.08
TPP	57.09%	42.91%
TPP swing	▲2.23	▼2.23

Turnout 94.84% (CV) — Informal 5.16%
Party	Votes	%	Swing	Seats	Change
Liberal	867,289	39.41	+ 2.95	17	▲1
National	214,522	9.75	+0.61	4	Steady
Liberal/National Coalition	1,081,811	49.15	+3.55	21	▲1
Labor	765,507	34.78	+0.08	6	▼1
Greens	111,314	5.06	+1.57		
Family First	80,820	3.67	+3.67		
One Nation	43,619	1.98	–5.09		
Democrats	30,255	1.37	–2.94		
Citizens Electoral Council	7,872	0.36	+ 0.22		
New Country	3,990	0.18	+0.18		
Great Australians	2,824	0.13	+0.13		
Socialist Alliance	1,251	0.06	+0.06		
HEMP	787	0.04	–0.01		
Ex-Service, Service and Veterans	734	0.03	+0.03		
Independents	70,104	3.18	–1.45		
Total	2,320,717			28	
Two-party-preferred vote
Liberal/National Coalition	1,256,533	57.09	+2.23	21	▲1
Labor	944,355	42.91	–2.23	6	▼1
Invalid/blank votes	119,829	5.16	+0.33		
Registered voters/turnout	2,475,611	93.74			
Source: AEC Tally Room

The Labor Party returned poor polling in the state, especially considering it was enjoying strong results at a state level through to 2004. Indeed, Labor recorded some of its lowest primary vote numbers in this state since the party's foundation in this election, while the Liberal party recorded some of its strongest. Queensland was the poorest state electorally for the Greens, while One Nation also suffered a 5.1% reduction in their primary vote.

=== Western Australia ===
2004 Australian federal election (Western Australia)
- 9 October 2004

All 15 Western Australian seats in the Australian House of Representatives and 6 seats in the Australian Senate
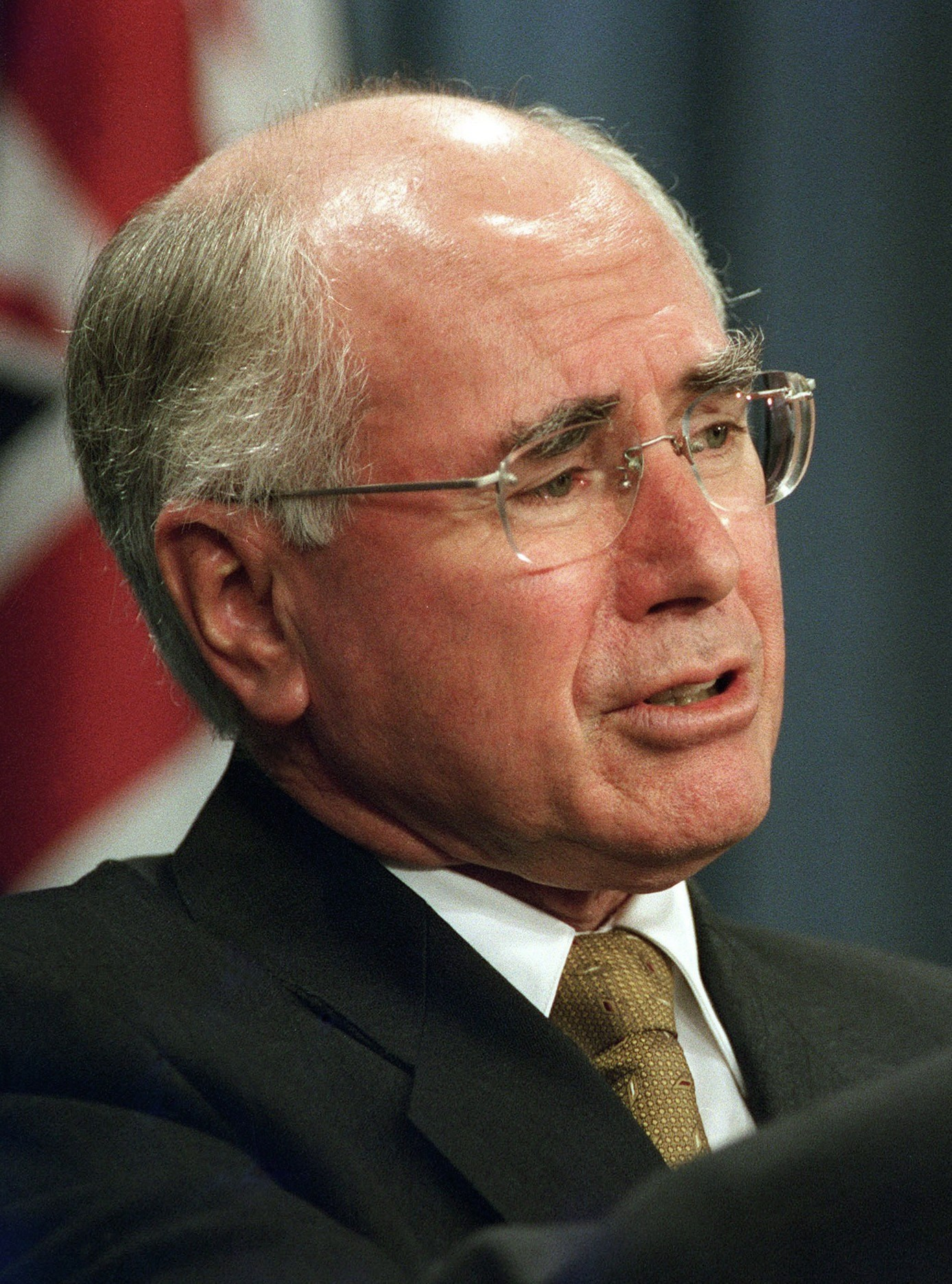

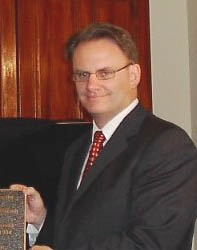
	First party	Second party
Leader	John Howard	Mark Latham
Party	Liberal/National coalition	Labor
Last election	8 seats	7 seats
Seats won	10 seats	5 seats
Seat change	▲2	▼2
Percentage	48.76%	34.75%
Swing	▲6.35	▼2.39
TPP	55.40%	44.60%
TPP swing	▲3.78	▼3.78

Turnout 92.79% (CV) — Informal 5.32%
Party	Votes	%	Swing	Seats	Change
Liberal	528,016	48.13	+ 6.74	10	▲2
National	6,895	0.63	–0.39		Steady
Liberal–National coalition	534,911	48.76	+6.35	10	▲2
Labor	381,200	34.75	–2.39	5	▼2
Greens	84,100	7.67	+ 1.68		
One Nation	27,650	2.52	–3.75		
Christian Democratics	24,650	2.25	+1.07		
Democrats	16,298	1.49	–3.17		
Citizens Electoral Council	6,539	0.60	+0.33		
Family First	2,619	0.24	+0.24		
New Country	2,625	0.24	+0.25		
Socialist Alliance	1,620	0.15	+0.15		
Independents	14,861	1.35	+ 0.82		
Total	1,158,687			15	
Two-party-preferred vote
Liberal/National Coalition	607,829	55.40	+ 3.78	10	▲2
Labor	489,244	44.60	–3.78	5	▼2
Invalid/blank votes	61,614	5.32	+0.40		
Registered voters/turnout	1,248,732	92.79			
Source: AEC Tally Room

Western Australia saw two seats change hands. The Liberal vote has always been considered strong in this state. It was made stronger in this election due to Kim Beazley's absence as Labor leader. Beazley, a native Western Australian was seen to bolster Labor's poll numbers when he stood in 1998 and 2001. This and the unpopular Labor state Geoff Gallop government of the time saw Labor's polling numbers slide to its lowest since 1977.

=== South Australia ===
2004 Australian federal election (South Australia)
- 9 October 2004

All 11 South Australian seats in the Australian House of Representatives and 6 seats in the Australian Senate
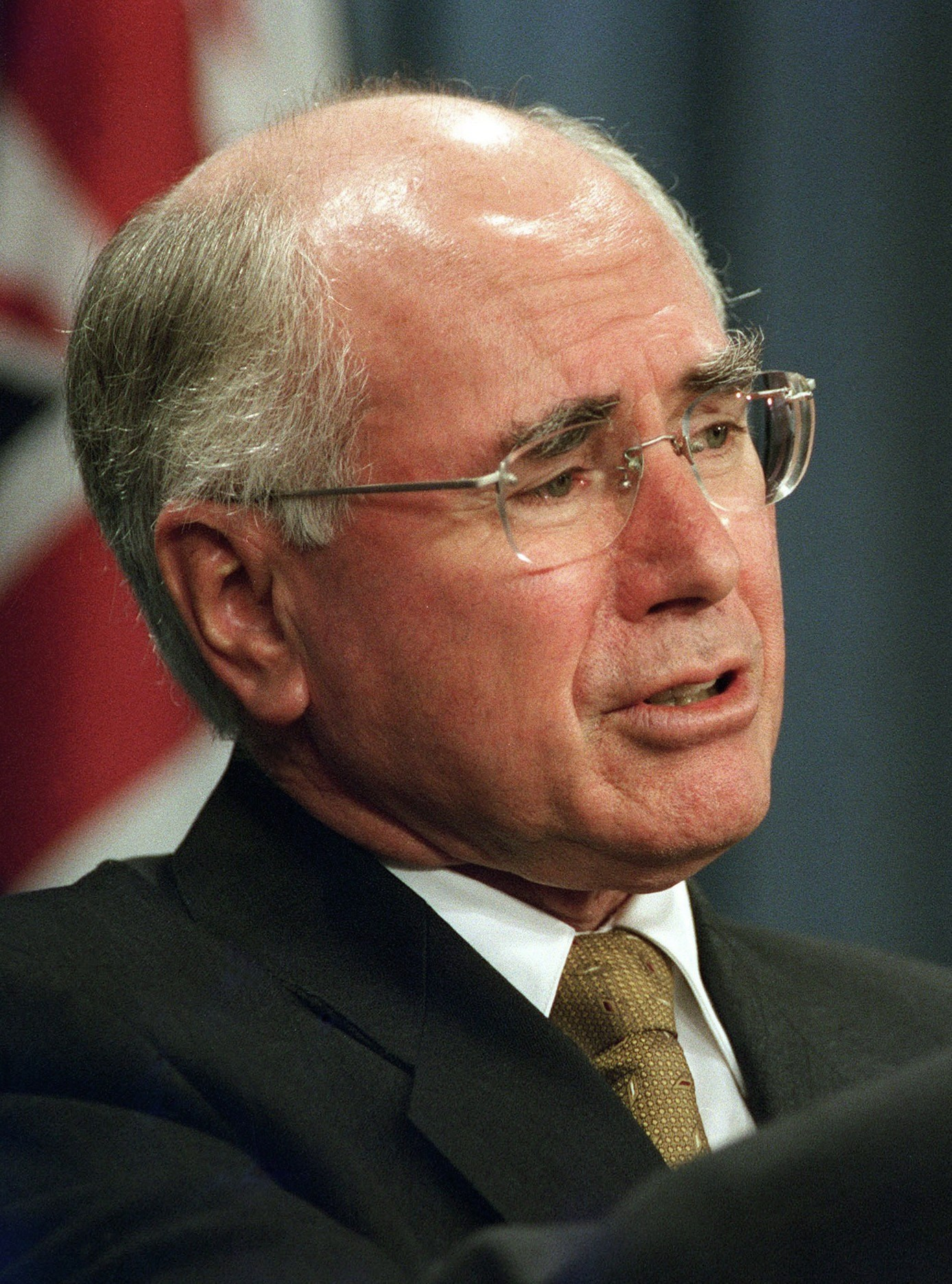

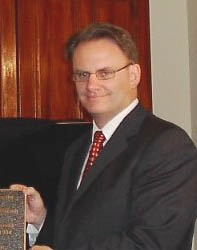
	First party	Second party
Leader	John Howard	Mark Latham
Party	Liberal/National coalition	Labor
Last election	9 seats	3 seats
Seats won	8 seats	3 seats
Seat change	▼1	Steady
Percentage	48.42%	36.75%
Swing	▲2.51	▲3.01
TPP	54.36%	45.64%
TPP swing	▲0.28	▼0.28

Turnout 94.79% (CV) — Informal 5.56%
Party	Votes	%	Swing	Seats	Change
Liberal	446,372	47.40	+ 1.49	8	▼1
National	9,611	1.02	+1.02	0	Steady
Liberal–National coalition	455,983	48.42	+2.52	8	▼1
Labor	346,071	36.75	+ 3.01	3	Steady
Greens	51,200	5.44	+1.80		
Democrats	17,682	1.88	–8.66		
One Nation	10,687	1.13	–3.62		
Family First	40,547	4.31	+4.31		
Independents	19,204	2.04	+1.16		
Total	997,102			11	▼1
Two-party-preferred vote
Liberal/National Coalition	511,845	54.36	+0.28	8	▼1
Labor	429,799	45.64	–0.28	3	Steady
Invalid/blank votes	55,458	5.56	+0.22		
Registered voters/turnout	1,051,923	94.79			
Source: AEC Tally Room

The redistribution saw South Australia lose one seat. This election saw four seats change hands; however, there was no net change in party representation. The Liberal vote rose slightly, as did Labor's (3.1% since 2001). While the Greens recorded a result of 5.4%.

=== Tasmania ===
2004 Australian federal election (Tasmania)
- 9 October 2004

All 5 Tasmanian seats in the Australian House of Representatives and 6 seats in the Australian Senate
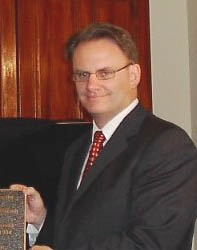

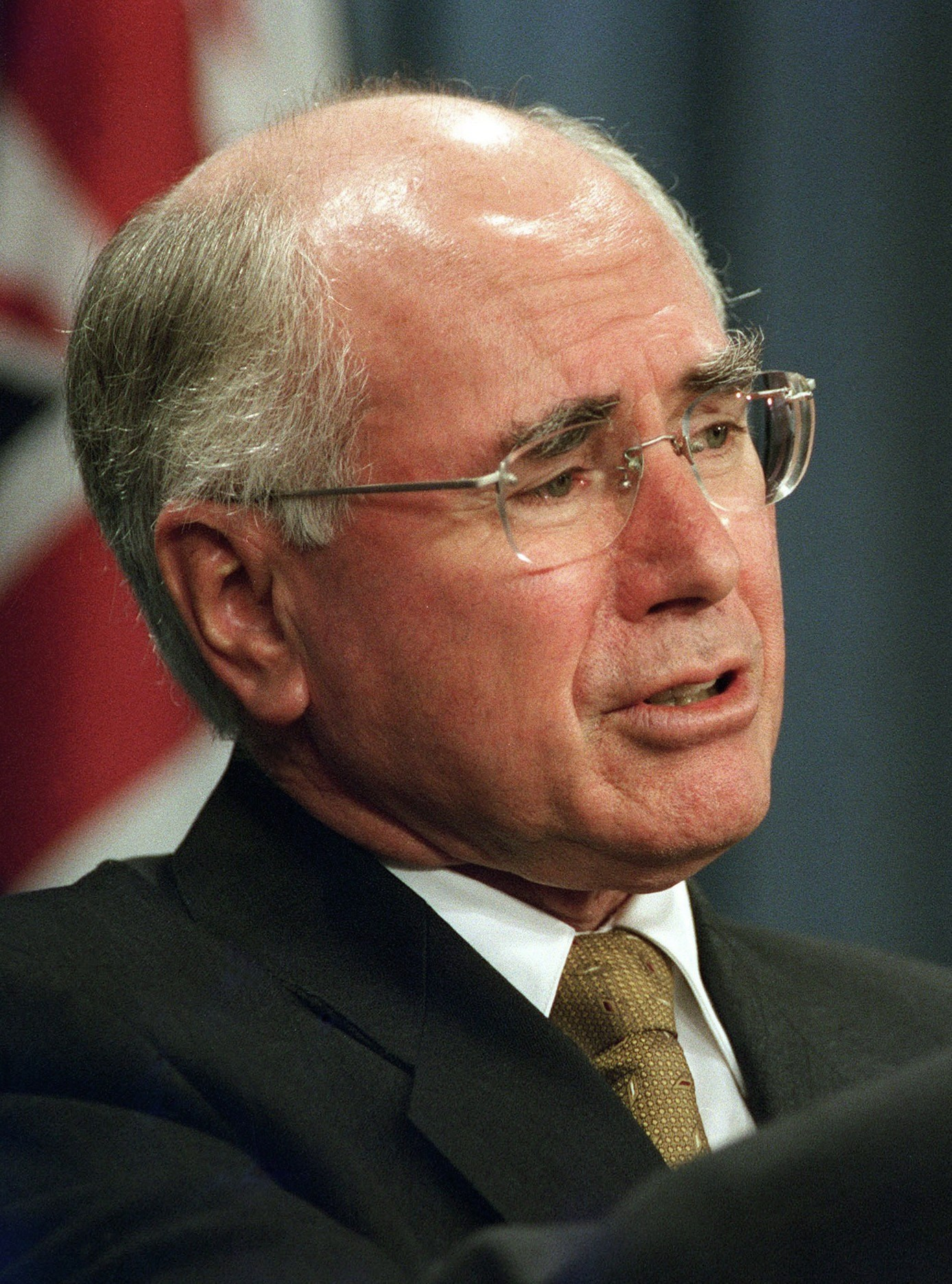
	First party	Second party
Leader	Mark Latham	John Howard
Party	Labor	Liberal/National coalition
Last election	5 seats	0 seats
Seats won	3 seats	2 seats
Seat change	▼2	▲2
Percentage	44.58%	41.98%
Swing	▼2.59	▲4.88
TPP	54.19%	45.81%
TPP swing	▼3.54	▲3.54
- Results by electorate

Turnout 95.64% (CV) — Informal 3.59%
Party	Votes	%	Swing	Seats	Change
Labor	140,918	44.58	–2.59	3	▼2
Liberal	132,724	41.98	+4.88	2	▲2
Greens	31,242	9.88	+2.07		
Family First	8,973	2.84	+2.84		
Citizens Electoral Council	1,158	0.37	+0.32		
Socialist Alliance	1,108	0.35	+0.35		
Total	316,123			5	
Two-party-preferred vote
Labor	171,294	54.19	–3.54	3	▼2
Liberal/National Coalition	144,829	45.81	+3.54	2	▲2

Labor to Liberal: Bass Braddon

Tasmania bucked the national trend against Labor. The party still lost two seats but maintained a primary vote of 44.6%. The Liberal party saw its primary vote jump 5.9% to 42.0%, and the Greens saw their strongest nationwide results capturing 9.9% of the vote.

== Territories ==
=== Australian Capital Territory ===
2004 Australian federal election (Australian Capital Territory)
- 9 October 2004

All 2 Australian Capital Territory seats in the Australian House of Representatives and all 2 seats in the Australian Senate
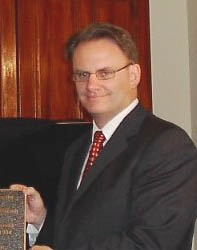

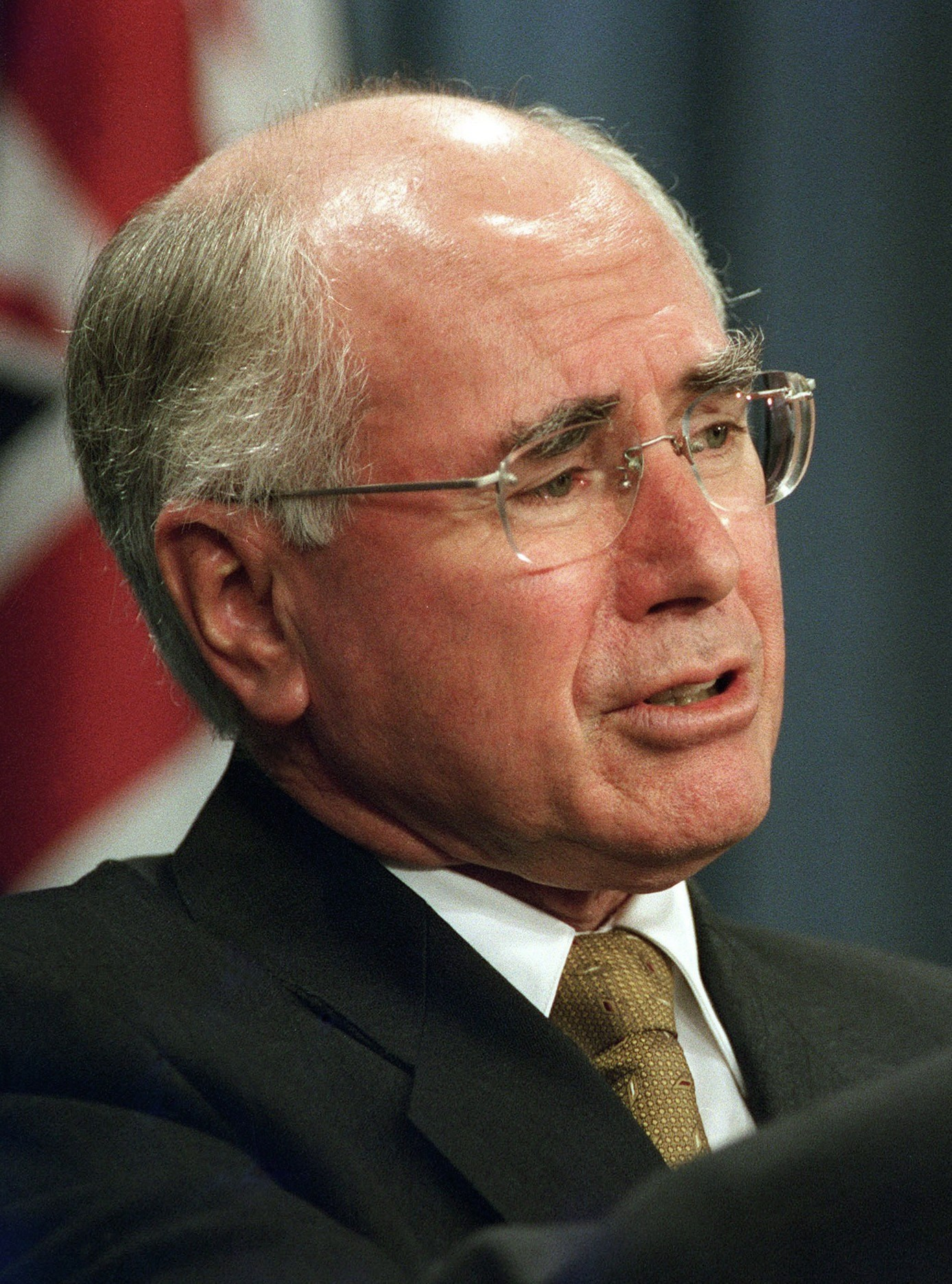
	First party	Second party
Leader	Mark Latham	John Howard
Party	Labor	Liberal/National coalition
Last election	2 seats	0 seats
Seats won	2 seats	0 seats
Seat change	Steady	Steady
Percentage	50.20%	35.20%
Swing	▲3.30	▲2.80
TPP	61.10%	38.90%
TPP swing	▼1.40	▲1.40

Turnout 95.85% (CV) — Informal 2.31%
Party	Votes	%	Swing	Seats	Change
Labor	104,836	50.2	+3.3	2	Steady
Liberal	73,508	35.2	+2.8	0	Steady
Greens	22,440	10.8	+3.7		
Democrats	5,010	2.4	–5.6		
Socialist Alliance	2,067	1.0	+1.0		
Citizens Electoral Council	765	0.4	+0.4		
Total	208,626			2	
Two-party-preferred vote
Labor		61.1	–1.4	2	Steady
Liberal		38.9	+1.4	0	Steady

=== Northern Territory ===
2004 Australian federal election (Northern Territory)
- 9 October 2004

All 2 Northern Territory seats in the Australian House of Representatives and all 2 seats in the Australian Senate
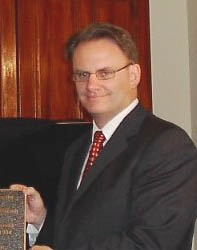

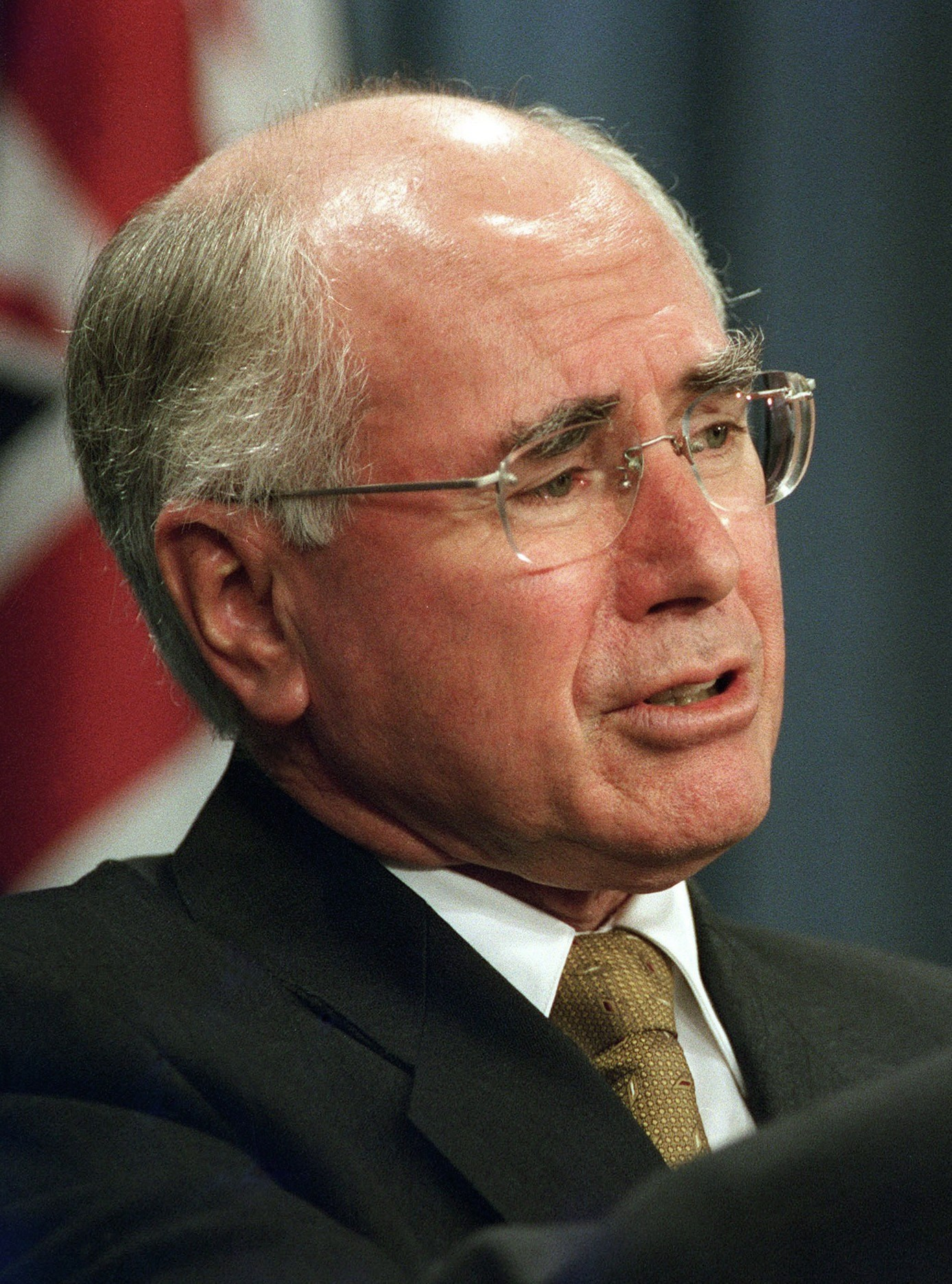
	First party	Second party
Leader	Mark Latham	John Howard
Party	Labor	Liberal/National coalition
Last election	1 seat	1 seat
Seats won	1 seat	1 seat
Seat change	Steady	Steady
Percentage	44.27%	43.84%
Swing	▲1.34	▲3.30
TPP	52.15%	47.85%
TPP swing	▼0.34	▲0.34

Turnout 86.53% (CV) — Informal 3.85%
Party	Votes	%	Swing	Seats	Change
Labor	40,246	44.27	+1.37	1	Steady
Country Liberal	39,855	43.84	+3.30	1	Steady
Greens	5,646	6.21	+2.19		
Democrats	2,152	2.37	–2.89		
Family First	1,000	1.10	+1.10		
Citizens Electoral Council	235	0.26	+0.26		
Independents	1,781	1.96	–1.49		
Total	89,972			2	
Two-party-preferred vote
Labor		52.15	–0.34	1	Steady
Country Liberal		47.85	+0.34	0	Steady

== Interpretation of results ==
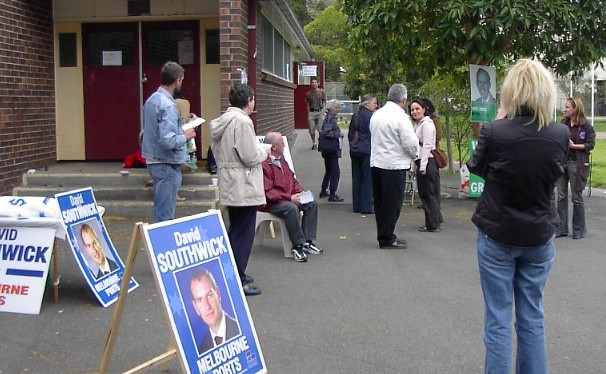
A polling booth on election day

The popularity of John Howard as prime minister and the ineffectiveness of Mark Latham as an opposition leader was what ultimately drove the Coalition's electoral success. The lack of viable alternatives as prime minister in the Coalition government helped consolidate this.

In the Howard government's third term, there had been the widely held view that the economy had been performing well, and economic security had increased. These economic circumstances were unusual for Australia following a tumultuous decade previously, one which saw a recession occur. This bolstered Howard's popularity, an opposition only stood a chance of making significant inroads against a leader much less popular than Howard.

Latham ran at times a scrappy campaign, announcing policy at unusual times and often without the consultation of his party room. Howard exploited this and succeeded in portraying him as inexperienced and risky. He also disregarded connecting to business or financial leaders, something which was viewed by many as a miscalculation.

The two main policy areas that dominated campaigning were that of international security (Iraq War, terrorism) and economic security. They did sway votes and drove people to defect from either party, but to a lesser extent. In polls conducted it was found that 82% of people opposed the war, yet only 4% listed it as their primary issue. Support for the war followed an unusual trajectory. Initially, the country's engagement in a war alongside Britain and the United States was met with outrage in the community. However, once Australia had committed troops to the war, public opinion began shifting. Public support for the war became largely positive in late 2003. There were many people who objected to it on a moral basis but relatively few cared enough to change their vote at the ballot box.

Labor frequently attacked the coalition on their record of providing adequate social services such as Medicare, education funding and social welfare. Policies were announced aimed at addressing these and this resonated with voters. Under the view of many in the electorate, these services had seen decline under the three terms of the coalition. School funding received particular attention with Latham announcing a bold remodelling of how federal funding would be split amongst independent and public schools. Latham suggested that elite private schools, some of the most expensive in the country, would have their funding slashed and redistributed to lower socioeconomic independent schools and government schools. This was seen by many as a departure from modern day political campaigning and a return to old fashioned class-warfare type politics. The media portrayed the policy dishonestly, describing it as removing all private school funding. This wasn't true, the policy ensured that the pool of independent funding remained but was distributed more to low-income schools. Nevertheless, Latham would be scalded in the media for adopting the policy with Victoria's Herald Sun running an editorial against him stating "Mr Latham's commitments are based on the fallacious, ideologically driven premise that all parents who send their children to so called wealthy schools are themselves rich".

The Coalition successfully countered these by running a campaign around interest rates stating that the spending envisaged by a Labor government would inevitably see interest rates increase. The "Keep interest rates low" campaign ran by the Coalition reminded the electorate frequently about the double digit interest rates that existed under the Hawke/Keating Labor governments in the 1980s and 1990s. Labor decided to counter this by quoting a Reuters survey of 14 financial market economists that stated the party in government would make no difference to the level of interest rates over the next term of government. Many in Australia had borrowed heavily at the time to finance their home ownership and were swayed by this line of campaigning by Howard. They were justifiably nervous about their future financial prospects and voted accordingly. People saw the risk of foreclosure as a greater threat than the risk of sub-standard healthcare services or an inequitable public education sector.

== See also ==
- Post-election pendulum for the 2004 Australian federal election
- Candidates of the 2004 Australian federal election
- Members of the Australian House of Representatives, 2004–2007
