= Candidates of the 2004 Australian federal election =

This article provides details on candidates who stood for the 2004 Australian federal election. The election was held on 9 October 2004.

== Redistributions and seat changes ==
- Redistributions occurred in Victoria, Queensland and South Australia.
  - In Victoria, the Labor-held seat of Burke was renamed Gorton. The Labor-held seat of McMillan became notionally Liberal.
    - The member for Burke, Brendan O'Connor (Labor), contested Gorton.
  - In Queensland, the notionally Labor seat of Bonner was created. The Labor-held seat of Bowman became notionally Liberal.
    - The member for Bowman, Con Sciacca (Labor), contested Bonner.
  - In South Australia, the Labor-held seat of Bonython was abolished. The Liberal-held seat of Wakefield became notionally Labor.
    - The member for Bonython, Martyn Evans (Labor), contested Wakefield.

== Retiring Members and Senators ==
=== Labor ===
- Laurie Brereton MP (Kingsford Smith, NSW)
- Janice Crosio MP (Prospect, NSW)
- Leo McLeay MP (Watson, NSW)
- Frank Mossfield MP (Greenway, NSW)
- Senator Nick Bolkus (SA)
- Senator Geoff Buckland (SA)
- Senator Peter Cook (WA)
- Senator Kay Denman (Tas)

=== Liberal ===
- Neil Andrew MP (Wakefield, SA)
- Bob Charles MP (La Trobe, Vic)
- Chris Gallus MP (Hindmarsh, SA)
- David Kemp MP (Goldstein, Vic)
- Daryl Williams MP (Tangney, WA)
- Senator Sue Knowles (WA)
- Senator Tsebin Tchen (Vic)

=== Independent ===
- Senator Brian Harradine (Tas)

== House of Representatives ==
Sitting members at the time of the election are shown in bold text. Successful candidates are highlighted in the relevant colour. Where there is possible confusion, an asterisk (*) is also used.

=== Australian Capital Territory ===
Electorate	Held by	Labor	Liberal	Greens	Democrats	Other
Canberra	Labor	**Annette Ellis**	Belinda Barnier	Sue Ellerman	Aaron Matthews	Jim Arnold (CEC)
Fraser	Labor	**Bob McMullan**	Adam Giles	David Turbayne	Lynne Grimsey	James Vassilopoulos (SA)

=== New South Wales ===
Electorate	Held by	Labor	Coalition	Greens	Democrats	Christian Democrats	Other
Banks	Labor	**Daryl Melham**	Roger Gray (Lib)	Stephen Makin	Mark Clyburn	Janne Peterson	Greg Briscoe-Hough (FFP); Harry Stavrinos (ON)
Barton	Labor	**Robert McClelland**	Bruce Morrow (Lib)	Angelo Mourikis	Eoin Coghlan		Neil Baird (ON)
Bennelong	Liberal	Nicole Campbell	**John Howard** (Lib)	Andrew Wilkie	Peter Goldfinch	Ray Levick	Gary Hannah (Ind); Troy Rollo (Ind)
Berowra	Liberal	Michael Colnan	**Philip Ruddock** (Lib)	Erland Howden	Margaret van de Weg	Bruce Coleman	Matthew Benson (Ind); Ross Blade (Ind); Lance Clark (FFP)
Blaxland	Labor	**Michael Hatton**	Mark Majewski (Lib)	Marlene Marquez-Obeid	Martine Eve-Macleod	Matthew Squires	Raul Bassi (SA); Terry Boath (CEC); Bob Vinnicombe (ON)
Bradfield	Liberal	Neil Neelam	**Brendan Nelson** (Lib)	Robert Goodwill	Jeannette Tsoulos		Sarah Montgomery (FFP)
Calare	Independent	Robyn Adams	Paul Blanch (Lib); Robert Griffith (Nat)	Stephen Nugent			**Peter Andren*** (Ind); Heidi van Schaik (CEC); Melanie Woods (FFP)
Charlton	Labor	**Kelly Hoare**	Kurt Darcey (Lib)	Suzanne Pritchard	Ben Roffey		Bob Johnson (ON); Paul Scarfe (FFP); David Stow (CEC)
Chifley	Labor	**Roger Price**	Costa Asarloglou (Lib)	Debbie Robertson		Dave Vincent	Terry Cooksley (ON); Robert Heathcote (FFP); Wayne Hyland (Ind); Graham Rand (-)
Cook	Liberal	Mark Buttigieg	**Bruce Baird** (Lib)	Corey Birtles	David Mendelssohn	Beth Smith	Andy Frew (ON); Peter Phillips (NGST); Graeme Strang (Ind)
Cowper	National	Allan Williams	**Luke Hartsuyker** (Nat)	John Carty	Trevor Kapeen		Norm Mann (LEF); Allan Stokes (ON)
Cunningham	Greens	Sharon Bird	John Larter (Lib)	**Michael Organ**	Tony Evans	Jeff Dakers	John Flanagan (NCP); James Keene (PLP); David Moulds (Ind); Christopher Scrogie (LFF); Paul Wilcock (Ind); Chris Williams (SA)
Dobell	Liberal	David Mehan	**Ken Ticehurst** (Lib)	Scott Rickard	Carolyn Hastie		Siou Hong Chia (ORP); Steven Hughes (CEC); James Laing-Peach (Ind); Naomi Paton (FFP); Frank Sanzari (LFF); Paul Unger (Ind); Les Wallace (Ind); Andrew Webber (ON)
Eden-Monaro	Liberal	Kel Watt	**Gary Nairn** (Lib)	Cecily Dignan	Nazia Ahmed	Ursula Bennett	Tim Quilty (ORP); Don Tarlinton (ON)
Farrer	Liberal	Nico Mathews	**Sussan Ley** (Lib)	Bruce Rowston	Frank Kovacs	Ian Burn	John Burbidge (Ind); Ray Jones (ON); Chris Lahy (CEC); Matt Morgan (Ind); Jennifer Weller (FFP)
Fowler	Labor	**Julia Irwin**	Philip Powrie (Lib)	Pauline Tyrrell			Hal Johnson (CEC); Jose Nunez (Ind)
Gilmore	Liberal	Megan Pikett	**Joanna Gash** (Lib)	Ben van der Wijngaart		Paul Green	Col Harding (ON); Jean McClung (CEC)
Grayndler	Labor	**Anthony Albanese**	Stephanie Kokkolis (Lib)	Philip Myers	Jen Harrison		Sue Johnson (SA)
Greenway	Labor	Ed Husic	Louise Markus (Lib)	Astrid O'Neill	David King	Greg Tan	Grant Bayley (ORP); Joe Chidiac (FP); John Dorhauer (FFP); Julie-Anne Houlton (LFF); F Ivor (Ind); Jean Lopez (SAS); Tony Pettitt (ON); Goran Reves (CEC); Amarjit Tanda (Ind)
Gwydir	National	Glenn Sims	**John Anderson** (Nat)	Michael Anderson			Bruce Haigh (Ind); Colin Rogers (ON); Richard Stringer (CEC)
Hughes	Liberal	Greg Holland	**Danna Vale** (Lib)	Lorraine Dixon	Rob Bunt	John Vanderjagt	Bob Davis (Vet)
Hume	Liberal	Graeme Shannon	**Alby Schultz** (Lib)	David Horton	Giuseppe Minissale	Geoff Peet	Lindsay Cosgrove (CEC); Peter Martin (Ind); Arthur Schofield (Ind)
Hunter	Labor	**Joel Fitzgibbon**	Beth Black (Nat)	Kerry Suwald		Adrian Melbourne	Bill Fox (Ind); Ann Lawler (CEC); Neil Scholes (ON); Michael Woods (FFP)
Kingsford Smith	Labor	Peter Garrett	Nicholas Prassas (Lib)	Hannah Robert	Nicole Tillotson		James Cogan (-); Maureen Frances (SA); Reg Gilroy (NGST); Charles Matthews (Ind); Anna Winter (ON)
Lindsay	Liberal	David Bradbury	**Jackie Kelly** (Lib)	Gabrielle Worrall	Geraldine Waters	John Phillips	Bruce Anderson (CEC); Barbie Bates (SAS); Garth Derrig (NGST); Louise Kedwell (ON); Megan Watson (FFP)
Lowe	Labor	**John Murphy**	John Sidoti (Lib)	Shireen Murphy	Biannca Pace	Peter Rahme	Timothy Avery (LFF); John Mason (ON)
Lyne	National	Greg Watters	**Mark Vaile** (Nat)	Jeremy Bradley	Peter Wildblood		Simon Apostle (FFP); Ron Bailey (SA); Graeme Muldoon (CEC); Robyn Murphy (NCO); Kerry Salt (Ind); Joan Stanfield (ON)
Macarthur	Liberal	Meg Oates	**Pat Farmer** (Lib)	Jennifer Hanson	Lester Pearce	Ralph Dunkerley	Mick Agius (FFP); Max Brazenall (Ind); Len Watkins (ON)
Mackellar	Liberal	Chris Sharpe	**Bronwyn Bishop** (Lib)	Christian Downie	Mario Nicotra		Robert Dunn (Ind); Roz Trestrail (FFP); Stephen Wells (Ind)
Macquarie	Liberal	Mark Ptolemy	**Kerry Bartlett** (Lib)	Joel Macrae	John Haydon	Brian Grigg	Matthew Derrig (NGST); Troy Geri (FFP); Michael Segedin (CEC); Tim Williams (Ind)
Mitchell	Liberal	Harmohan Walia	**Alan Cadman** (Lib)	Sheryl Jarecki	Kamran Keshavarz Talebi	Michael Horgan	Jordie Bodlay (Ind); Stephen Burke (Ind); Norman Byleveld (ON); Joy Montgomery (FFP)
New England	Independent	Greg Smith	Trevor Khan (Nat); Scot MacDonald (Lib)	Bruce Taylor			Steve Lawler (CEC); Raymond Scholes (ON); **Tony Windsor*** (Ind)
Newcastle	Labor	**Sharon Grierson**	Josephine Barfield (Lib)	Annie Rooke-Frizell	Eddie Smith		Don Bower (CEC); Peter Robson (SA); Harry Williams (PLP)
North Sydney	Liberal	Fran Teirney	**Joe Hockey** (Lib)	Ted Nixon	Jan de Voogd		Edwina Cowdery (Ind)
Page	National	Kevin Bell	**Ian Causley** (Nat)	Mark Jackson			Belinda Anderson (LFF); Doug Behn (-); Tom Flanagan (SA); Angela Griffiths (CEC); Chris Mateer (ORP)
Parkes	National	Joe Knagge	**John Cobb** (Nat)	Terrance Loughlin			Michael Boland (Ind); Makere Rangihaeata (CEC)
Parramatta	Liberal	Julie Owens	**Ross Cameron** (Lib)	Doug Williamson	Rob McFarlane	Sam Baissari	Margaret Bloor (SAS); Mark Guest (LFF); Andrew Markwell (FFP); Alex Peniazev (NCP); Simon Saad (NGST); John Satchwell (ON)
Paterson	Liberal	Giovanna Kozary	**Bob Baldwin** (Lib)	Aina Ranke	Brett Paterson		Charlie Griffith (ON); Paul Hennelly (FP); Tony King (CEC); Bruce McKenzie (Vet); Larissa Robb (FFP); Neil Smith (Ind); Mike Tuffy (Ind)
Prospect	Labor	Chris Bowen	Robert Jacobucci (Lib)	Kelly Marks	Lily Arthur	Manny Poularas	John Abromas (ON)
Reid	Labor	**Laurie Ferguson**	Sarah McMahon (Lib)	Wafaa Salti	Tony Yoo	Kylie Laurence	Nicholas Khoury (NGST); Lisa Macdonald (SA); Neville Williams (ON)
Richmond	National	Justine Elliot	**Larry Anthony** (Nat)	Susanna Flower	Timothy Winton-Brown		Dean Jefferys (NDP); Craig Lees (FFP); Fiona Tyler (LFF); Allan Watt (Vet)
Riverina	National	Victoria Brooks	**Kay Hull** (Nat)	Ray Goodlass			Neil Turner (ON)
Robertson	Liberal	Trish Moran	**Jim Lloyd** (Lib)	Terry Jones			Carolyn Dorhauer (FFP); Don Parkes (ON); Nicholas Tomlin (CEC)
Shortland	Labor	**Jill Hall**	Dell Tschanter (Lib)	Bob Phillips	Peter Lee		Brian Dixon (FFP); Florence Roberts (ON)
Sydney	Labor	**Tanya Plibersek**	Michael Shevers (Lib)	Jenny Leong	Michelle Bleicher		Adrian Ford (CEC); Susan Price (SA); Jane Ward (Ind); Michael Webb (Ind)
Throsby	Labor	**Jennie George**	Linda Nelson (Lib)	Trevor Jones	Madeleine Roberts		
Warringah	Liberal	Linda Beattie	**Tony Abbott** (Lib)	Ian Hehir			Neil Francey (Ind); David Kelly (ON); Edward Kelly (FP); Phil McPherson (FFP); Patricia Petersen (Ind); Peter Thyer (Ind); Dian Underwood (Ind)
Watson	Labor	Tony Burke	Keith Topolski (Lib)	Kali Reid	Garry Dalrymple		Cat Cannone (FFP); John Coleman (ON); Ron Poulsen (-)
Wentworth	Liberal	David Patch	Malcolm Turnbull (Lib)	Mithra Cox	Lindy Morrison		Brian Buckley (NGST); Leonie Hull (FFP); John Jamieson (CEC); **Peter King** (Ind); Pat Sheil (Ind); Victor Shen (FP); Robert Vogler (Ind)
Werriwa	Labor	**Mark Latham**	Michael Medway (Lib)	Ben Raue	Patrick Briscoe-Hough		Sam Bargshoon (Ind); Charles Doggett (ON); Mike Head (-)

=== Northern Territory ===
Electorate	Held by	Labor	CLP	Greens	Democrats	Other
Lingiari	Labor	**Warren Snowdon**	Maisie Austin	James Bristow	David Curtis	Andrew Mills (Ind)
Solomon	CLP	Jim Davidson	**Dave Tollner**	Ilana Eldridge	Duncan Dean	Peter Flynn (CEC); Maurice Foley (-); Mark West (FFP)

=== Queensland ===
Electorate	Held by	Labor	Coalition	Greens	Democrats	Family First	Other
Blair	Liberal	Shayne Neumann	**Cameron Thompson** (Lib)	Sarai O'Reilly-Reis	Neal McKenzie	Priscilla Smith	John Bennett (TGA); David Chidgey (ON); Alan Price (NCO); Rodney Stapleton (CEC)
Bonner	Labor	**Con Sciacca**	Ross Vasta (Lib)	Elissa Jenkins	Chad Smith	Trevor Hunt	Barry Myatt (ON); William Wheeler (CEC)
Bowman	Liberal	Donna Webster	Andrew Laming* (Lib); Joe Ross (Nat)	Paula Nadas	Robert Bromwich	Mal Cayley	
Brisbane	Labor	**Arch Bevis**	Ingrid Tall (Lib); Nick Withycombe (Nat)	Richard Nielsen	Tracy Schrader	Charles Newington	J F Barnes (Ind); Nick Contarino (CEC); Coral Wynter (SA)
Capricornia	Labor	**Kirsten Livermore**	Di Kuntschik (Lib); John Lever (Nat)	Michael Kane	Naomi Johns	Alan Spackman	Judy Canales (HEMP); Larry Coleman (ON); Bill Ingrey (CEC)
Dawson	National	Cherry Feeney	**De-Anne Kelly** (Nat)	Tony Fontes	Archie Julien	Bev Smith	Lewis Arroita (ON); Debbie Lowis (NCO); Margaret Menzel (Ind); Jan Pukallus (CEC)
Dickson	Liberal	Craig McConnell	**Peter Dutton** (Lib)	Howard Nielsen	Kirsty Reye	Dale Shuttleworth	Terry Hyland (TGA)
Fadden	Liberal	Peter Eather	**David Jull** (Lib)	Willy Bach	Suzanne Wilson	Lyn Rees	Ken Martin (CEC); John Walter (ON)
Fairfax	Liberal	Ivan Molloy	**Alex Somlyay** (Lib)	David Norris	Debbie Campbell	Paula Hunt	Patrick Rozanski (ON); Kev Watt (CEC)
Fisher	Liberal	John Gray	**Peter Slipper** (Lib)	Robert Muston	Craig Wilmot	Ronald Hill	Liz Hays (TGA); Kevin Savage (ON)
Forde	Liberal	Sean Leader	**Kay Elson** (Lib)	Daniel Lloyd	Anita Martin	Shereen Hinds	Aaron Heaps (ON); Daniel Hope (CEC); David Howse (-)
Griffith	Labor	**Kevin Rudd**	Janelle Payne (Lib)	Darryl Rosin	Bruce Carnwell	James Turner	Lynda Hansen (SA); Derek Rosborough (Ind)
Groom	Liberal	Paul King	**Ian Macfarlane** (Lib)	Karey Harrison	Christoph Donges	Peter Findlay	Oliver Carter (CEC); Rod Jeanneret (Ind); Noel Wieck (TGA)
Herbert	Liberal	Anita Phillips	**Peter Lindsay** (Lib)	Jenny Stirling	Richard Hoolihan	Cathy Eaton	William Brennan (ON); Les Marsden (CEC)
Hinkler	National	Cheryl Dorron	**Paul Neville** (Nat)	Greg George	Alison Jensen	Cameron Rub	Cindy Rolls (CEC); Roy D Wells (Ind); Tracey Zerk (Vet)
Kennedy	Independent	Alan Neilan	James Doyle (Nat)	Angela Jones	Terry Hennessey	Keith Douglas	Bill Hankin (ON); Judith Harris (CEC); **Bob Katter*** (Ind)
Leichhardt	Liberal	Jim Turnour	**Warren Entsch** (Lib)	Neville St John-Wood	Allen Reid	Ric Lippmann	Jen Sackley (Ind)
Lilley	Labor	**Wayne Swan**	Alan Boulton (Lib)	Sue Meehan	Dawn Forsyth	Brad Hill	
Longman	Liberal	Stephen Beckett	**Mal Brough** (Lib)	Philip Kimmet	Jacqueline Kennedy	Tom Lew	Susan Meredith (ON)
Maranoa	National	Shane Guley	**Bruce Scott** (Nat)	Jonathan Rihan	Greg Ridge	Stephen Moloney	Rick Benham (NCO); Philip Black (Ind); Santo Ferraro (ON); David Klingsporn (CEC)
McPherson	Liberal	Kellie Trigger	**Margaret May** (Lib)	Ian Latto	Russell White	Rob Davey	Paul Lewis (ON)
Moncrieff	Liberal	David Parrish	**Steven Ciobo** (Lib)	Michael Beale	Ros Roberts	James Tayler	Sandy Sanderson (CEC); Mark Smith (ON)
Moreton	Liberal	Graham Perrett	**Gary Hardgrave** (Lib)	Jane Williamson	Frederika Steen	Terence Tam	Andrew Lamb (Ind); Barry Weedon (ON)
Oxley	Labor	**Bernie Ripoll**	Daniel Smith (Lib)	Kevin Brennan	Nicholas Wood	Robert Boyne	Bill Flynn (ON); Brian Haag (CEC); Michael Myles (SA); George Pugh (Ind)
Petrie	Liberal	Gavin Brady	**Teresa Gambaro** (Lib)	Rick Pass	Terri Bell	Wade Whincop	
Rankin	Labor	**Craig Emerson**	Mike Boyd (Nat); Wendy Creighton (Lib)	Julian Hinton	Catherine Sporle	Ross Wilson	Margaret Hands (ON); Robert Meyers (CEC); Darren Power (Ind)
Ryan	Liberal	Victoria Chatterjee	**Michael Johnson** (Lib)	Paul Swan	Simon Ingram	Percy Campbell	Neville Solomon (CEC)
Wide Bay	National	Sean Ambrose	**Warren Truss** (Nat)	Ian Richards	Darryl Weir	Glen Wilson	Cy d'Oliviera (Ind); Lars Hedberg (Ind); Wesley Robinson (ON)

=== South Australia ===
Electorate	Held by	Labor	Liberal	Greens	Democrats	Family First	Other
Adelaide	Liberal	Kate Ellis	**Trish Worth**	Jake Bugden	Richard Pascoe	Peter Robins	Amanda Barlow (Ind)
Barker	Liberal	Waluwe Simpson-Lyttle	**Patrick Secker**	Pam Kelly	Graham McNaughton	Philip Cornish	Tim Jackson (Nat); Neil Russell-Taylor (ON); Rodger Schmidt (Ind)
Boothby	Liberal	Chloë Fox	**Andrew Southcott**	Adrian Miller	Robert Simms	Paul Munn	Clarke Staker (ON); Paul Starling (Ind)
Grey	Liberal	John Hackett	**Barry Wakelin**	Felicity Martin	Gil Robertson	Roger Kleinig	Peter Fitzpatrick (ON); Paul Siebert (CEC)
Hindmarsh	Liberal	Steve Georganas	Simon Birmingham	Tim White	Nicole Prince	Trevor Grace	Joe Ienco (Ind); Tony Musolino (Ind); Barbara Pannach (ON); Bill Thomas (Ind)
Kingston	Labor	**David Cox**	Kym Richardson	Yvonne Darlington	Deirdre Albrighton	Andrew Cole	Laurel Payne (ON)
Makin	Liberal	Tony Zappia	**Trish Draper**	Jon Moore	Catherine Opitz	Rob Pillar	Victor Horvat (ON); Jeanie Walker (Ind)
Mayo	Liberal	James Murphy	**Alexander Downer**	Dennis Matthews	Kathy Brazher-de Laine	Kevin Cramp	Brian Deegan (Ind); Robert Fechner (ON); Jon Grear (Ind)
Port Adelaide	Labor	**Rod Sawford**	Terry Inglis	Anne McMenamin	Trevor Tucker	Richard Bunting	Stan Batten (ON)
Sturt	Liberal	Tony Barca	**Christopher Pyne**	Zane Young	Kerrin Pine	Sally McPherson	Brian Richards (ON)
Wakefield	Labor	**Martyn Evans**	David Fawcett	Patricia Murray	Richard Way	David Pointon	David Dwyer (ON)

=== Tasmania ===
Electorate	Held by	Labor	Liberal	Greens	Family First	Other
Bass	Labor	**Michelle O'Byrne**	Michael Ferguson	Jeremy Ball	Christine Bergman	Meredith de Landelles (SA); Caroline Larner (CEC)
Braddon	Labor	**Sid Sidebottom**	Mark Baker	Michelle Foale	Wayne De Bomford	
Denison	Labor	**Duncan Kerr**	Erick Pastoor	Helen Burnet	Gino Papiccio	Kamala Emanuel (SA)
Franklin	Labor	**Harry Quick**	Henry Finnis	Mathew Woolley	Marc Mumford	Glenn Shields (SA)
Lyons	Labor	**Dick Adams**	Ben Quin	Glenn Millar	Marie Papiccio	Saul Jenkins (CEC)

=== Victoria ===
Electorate	Held by	Labor	Coalition	Greens	Democrats	Family First	Other
Aston	Liberal	Paul Morgan	**Chris Pearce** (Lib)	Michael Abson	Nahum Ayliffe	Peter Nathan	Nevil Brewer (NGST); Doug Mitchell (CEC)
Ballarat	Labor	**Catherine King**	Elizabeth Matuschka (Lib)	Tony Kelly		Vlad Adamek	Claire Lindorff (DLP); Valiant von Thule Halborg (CEC)
Batman	Labor	**Martin Ferguson**	Maxwell Gratton (Lib)	Alexandra Bhathal	Scott Kneebone	Chris Ariaratnam	Craig Bishop (Ind); Peter Byrne (-); Graham Matthews (SA); Walter Mellado (CEC)
Bendigo	Labor	**Steve Gibbons**	Kevin Gibbins (Lib)	David Petersen		Nathan Hulls	Vern White (CEC)
Bruce	Labor	**Alan Griffin**	Angela Randall (Lib)	Tania Giles	Paul van den Bergen	Richard Warner	William Larner (CEC)
Calwell	Labor	**Maria Vamvakinou**	Dianne Livett (Lib)	Mohamad Alman	Jonathon Gatt	Gary Canham	Denis Towers (Ind); Sleiman Yohanna (CEC)
Casey	Liberal	Tony Dib	**Tony Smith** (Lib)	Joy Ringrose	Jos Vandersman	Andrew Rushton	Jeremy Beck (CEC); Daniel Chapman (-)
Chisholm	Labor	**Anna Burke**	Stephen Hartney (Lib)	Penny Harris	James Bennett	Gary Ong	Wayne Barwick (CEC); Owen Lysaght (Ind)
Corangamite	Liberal	Peter McMullin	**Stewart McArthur** (Lib)	Stephen Chenery		Christine Modra	Andrew Bailey (CEC); Chris Johnson (SA)
Corio	Labor	**Gavan O'Connor**	Bruce King (Lib)	Brett Constable		Gordon Alderson	Steven Bird (CEC); Tim Gooden (SA); Steve Malesic (Ind)
Deakin	Liberal	Peter Lynch	**Phil Barresi** (Lib)	Bill Pemberton	Alan Bailey	Yasmin de Zilwa	Steve Raskovy (Ind); Simon Tait (CEC)
Dunkley	Liberal	Helen Constas	**Bruce Billson** (Lib)	Paula Johnson	Karen Bailey	Cameron Eastman	Fletcher Davis (Ind); Gabrielle Peut (CEC)
Flinders	Liberal	Simon Napthine	**Greg Hunt** (Lib)	Stuart Kingsford	Bruce Errol	Dean Johnstone	Neale Adams (Ind); Henry Broadbent (CEC); Paul Madigan (Ind)
Gellibrand	Labor	**Nicola Roxon**	David McConnell (Lib)	Nam Bui	Max Grarock	Michael Lee	Wajde Assaf (Ind); Kel Isherwood (CEC); Linda Waldron (SA)
Gippsland	National	Don Wishart	**Peter McGauran** (Nat)	Madelon Lane	David Langmore	Doug Lillyman	Ben Buckley (ON); Peter Kelly (Ind); Christina Sindt (-); Heather Stanton (CEC)
Goldstein	Liberal	Craig Tucker	Andrew Robb (Lib)	Bill Clair	Aron Igai	Mark Hermans	Terry O'Brien (Ind); Heather Shomali (CEC)
Gorton	Labor	**Brendan O'Connor**	Susan Jennison (Lib)	Steven Wilson		Ian Mallon	Colin Campbell (CEC)
Higgins	Liberal	Paul Klisaris	**Peter Costello** (Lib)	Robert Trafficante	Adam McBeth	Glen Pringle	Katherine Reid (CEC)
Holt	Labor	**Anthony Byrne**	Paul Teiwes (Lib)	Jim Reiher	Daniel Berk	Stephen Burgess	Jason John (CEC)
Hotham	Labor	**Simon Crean**	Jennifer Marriner (Lib)	Kiera Perrott	Jessica Joss	Roger Coombe	Josephine Cox (SA); Adam Ellery (CEC)
Indi	Liberal	John Williams	**Sophie Panopoulos** (Lib)	Jenny O'Connor		Warren McMartin	Merrill Bailey (CEC)
Isaacs	Labor	**Ann Corcoran**	Jeff Shelley (Lib)	Sean Hardy	Haydn Fletcher	Jacob Mathews	Gordon Ford (Ind); Carl Groves (ON); Martha Malliotis (CEC)
Jagajaga	Labor	**Jenny Macklin**	Woody Inman (Lib)	Don Ardin	Cate Hayward	Jennifer Barton	Stephen Lele (CEC); Barry Minster (Vet); Gary Schorel-Hlavka (ADP)
Kooyong	Liberal	Tom Wilson	**Petro Georgiou** (Lib)	Peter Campbell	Mary Dettman	John Laidler	Andrew Reed (CEC)
Lalor	Labor	**Julia Gillard**	Peter Curtis (Lib)	Malcolm Browning	Roger Howe	Arthur Buller	Sally Larner (CEC)
La Trobe	Liberal	Susan Davies	Jason Wood (Lib)	Craig Smith	Tony Holland	Darryl Bridges	Kurt Beilharz (CEC); Frank Dean (Ind); Wolf Voigt (CDP)
Mallee	National	John Zigouras	**John Forrest** (Nat)	Simon Roberts	Stephen Parr	Kevin Smith	Trudy Campbell (CEC)
Maribyrnong	Labor	**Bob Sercombe**	Conrad D'Souza (Lib)	Bob Muntz	Robert Livesay	David Holt	Andre Kozlowski (CEC)
McEwen	Liberal	Jenny Beales	**Fran Bailey** (Lib)	Megan Hannes-Paterson	Marj White	Mark Sach	Robert Gordon (Ind); Damon Lutz (Ind); Rod McLennan (CEC); Maurie Smith (Ind)
McMillan	Liberal	**Christian Zahra**	Russell Broadbent* (Lib); Bridget McKenzie (Nat)	Chris Aitken	Julie Grant	Harold Paul	Greg Byrne (DLP); Howard Emanuel (Ind); A R Gizycki de Gozdawa (ON); Graeme Reid (CEC)
Melbourne	Labor	**Lindsay Tanner**	Jerry Dimitroulis (Lib)	Gemma Pinnell	Angela Williams	Chris Willis	Steven Anger (Ind); Zoe Kenny (SA); Rhys McGuckin (CEC)
Melbourne Ports	Labor	**Michael Danby**	David Southwick (Lib)	Jo Lewis	Craig Beale	Graeme Jackel	Les Cameron (Ind); Leonie Horin (Ind); Aaron Isherwood (CEC)
Menzies	Liberal	Brian Jones	**Kevin Andrews** (Lib)	Matthew Wright	Anne Page	John Bridge	Jordon Davidson (CEC)
Murray	Liberal	Norm Kelly	**Sharman Stone** (Lib)	Monica Morgan		Janine Madill	Rob Bryant (Ind); Elisa Barwick (CEC); Diane Teasdale (Ind)
Scullin	Labor	**Harry Jenkins**	Lucas Kostadinoski (Lib)	Merinda Gray		Amy Shand	Simon Steer (CEC)
Wannon	Liberal	Robert McAlpine	**David Hawker** (Lib)	Gillian Blair	Kerre Willsher	Ruth Hazelton	Robert Barwick (CEC); Leigh McDonald (Ind)
Wills	Labor	**Kelvin Thomson**	Blair Hamilton (Lib)	Toby Archer	Robert Stone	Deborah Suraci	David Glanz (SA); Noelene Isherwood (CEC)

=== Western Australia ===
Electorate	Held by	Labor	Liberal	Greens	Democrats	Christian Democrats	Other
Brand	Labor	**Kim Beazley**	Phil Edman	Jean Jenkins	John Partridge	Rajesh Vettoor	Gerard Kettle (Ind); Garth Stockden (ON); Rob Totten (CEC)
Canning	Liberal	Kay Hallahan	**Don Randall**	Margo Beilby	Tony Bennell	Vivian Hill	Bev Custers (FFP); Angelo Dacheff (ON); Margaret Dodd (Ind); Brian McCarthy (CEC)
Cowan	Labor	**Graham Edwards**	Luke Simpkins	Glen George	Sarah Gilfillan	Richard Leeder	Basil Atkins (CEC); Clem Winton (ON)
Curtin	Liberal	Bill Kruse	**Julie Bishop**	Sonja Lundie-Jenkins	Rob Olver	Gail Forder	Albert Caine (ON); Colin Horne (CEC)
Forrest	Liberal	Tresslyn Smith	**Geoff Prosser**	Kingsley Gibson	Adam Welch	Shane Flanegan	Alan Giorgi (ON); Linda Rose (FFP); Ian Tuffnell (CEC); Ken Vagg (NCO)
Fremantle	Labor	**Carmen Lawrence**	Carmelo Zagami	Nicola Paris	Delys Beaumont	Michelle Shave	Ian Jamieson (SA); Craig Mackintosh (ON); Damian Poole (CEC)
Hasluck	Labor	**Sharryn Jackson**	Stuart Henry	Jane Bremmer	Nicola Hannah	Terry Ryan	Simon Hall (CEC); Paul Nield (ON)
Kalgoorlie	Liberal	Tom Stephens	**Barry Haase**	Kado Muir	Don Hoddy	Craig Hendry	Graeme Campbell (Ind); Brendon Cook (Ind); Nabil Haji Rowland (Ind); Robin Scott (ON); Lorraine Thomas (CEC)
Moore	Liberal	Kim Young	**Mal Washer**	Thor Kerr	Kevin Payne	Evelynne Wong	George Gault (ON); Arthur Harvey (CEC)
O'Connor	Liberal	Ursula Richards	**Wilson Tuckey**	Adrian Price	David Thackrah	Justin Moseley	George Giudice (Ind); Leigh Hardingham (Nat); Jan Hough (NCO); Brian McRae (ON); Callum Payne (CEC)
Pearce	Liberal	David Ritter	**Judi Moylan**	Dominique Lieb	Donella McLean	Robert Merrells	David Gunnyon (ON); Ron McLean (CEC); Jeanette Radisich (NCO); Annolies Truman (SA)
Perth	Labor	**Stephen Smith**	Alexander Lawrance	Alison Xamon	Ray Bradbury	Augustine Loh	Marie Edmonds (ON); Ross Russell (CEC); Nikki Ulasowski (SA)
Stirling	Labor	**Jann McFarlane**	Michael Keenan	Katrina Bercov	Giuseppe Coletti	Ray Moran	Marcus Anderson (Ind); Alex Patrick (ON); Leone Pearson (CEC)
Swan	Labor	**Kim Wilkie**	Andrew Murfin	Dave Fort	Mark Reynolds	Gwen Hamence	Peter Greaves (FFP); Azmi Johari (CEC); Teresa van Lieshout (Ind); Ted Vermeer (ON)
Tangney	Liberal	Gavin Waugh	Dennis Jensen	Andrew Duckett	Andrew Ingram	Colleen Tapley	Lloyd Boon (ON); Neil Vincent (CEC); Wilson Wu (Ind)

== Senate ==
Sitting senators are shown in bold text. Tickets that elected at least one Senator are highlighted in the relevant colour. Successful candidates are identified by an asterisk (*).

=== Australian Capital Territory ===
Two Senate places were up for election. The Labor Party was defending one seat. The Liberal Party was defending one seat.

Labor	Liberal	Greens	Democrats	Christian Democrats
1. **Kate Lundy***; 2. David Smith	1. **Gary Humphries***; 2. Ian Morison	1. Kerrie Tucker; 2. Roland Manderson	1. Rachael Jacobs; 2. Peter Bourne	1. Tim Janes; 2. John Miller
APA	Ungrouped			
1. Jeannette Jolley; 2. Ryan Deebank	Dave Edwards			

=== New South Wales ===
Six Senate places were up for election. The Labor Party was defending three seats. The Liberal-National Coalition was defending two seats. The Australian Democrats were defending one seat. Senators George Campbell (Labor), Helen Coonan (Liberal), Sandy Macdonald (National), Kerry Nettle (Greens), Marise Payne (Liberal) and Ursula Stephens (Labor) were not up for re-election.

Labor	Coalition	Greens	Democrats	Christian Democrats
1. **Steve Hutchins***; 2. **John Faulkner***; 3. **Michael Forshaw***; 4. Joanna Woods	1. **Bill Heffernan*** (Lib); 2. Concetta Fierravanti-Wells* (Lib); 3. Fiona Nash* (Nat); 4. **John Tierney** (Lib); 5. Michael Darby (Lib); 6. Robyn Bain (Nat)	1. John Kaye; 2. Carol Berry; 3. Ben Oquist; 4. Susie Russell; 5. Trish Mullins; 6. Jeremy Buckingham	1. **Aden Ridgeway**; 2. Nina Burridge; 3. Greg Butler	1. Fred Nile; 2. Patricia Giles; 3. Peter Walker; 4. Kevin Hume; 5. George Capsis
One Nation	Family First	CEC	Liberals for Forests	Socialist Alliance
1. Judith Newson; 2. Lynn Stanfield; 3. Peter Bussa	1. Joan Woods; 2. Ivan Herald	1. Robert Butler; 2. Richard Witten	1. Glenn Druery; 2. Ruth Green	1. Kylie Moon; 2. Ray Jackson
Fishing Party	Nuclear Disarmament	APA	Progressive Labour	AAFI
1. Robert Smith; 2. David Hitchcock	1. Michael Denborough; 2. Yvonne Francis	1. Reese Malcolm; 2. Lee Raper	1. Klaas Woldring; 2. Kate Ferguson	1. David Kitson; 2. Edwin Woodger
New Country	HEMP	Non-Custodial Parents	No GST	Outdoor Recreation
1. Greg Graham; 2. Lisa de Meur	1. Michael Balderstone; 2. Graham Askey	1. Grahame Marks; 2. Andrew Thompson	1. Mick Gallagher; 2. Warwick Mead	1. Leon Belgrave; 2. Janos Beregszaszi
Save the ADI Site	Great Australians	Lower Excise	Veterans	Group A
1. Geoff Brown; 2. Bernie Laughlan	1. Brett McHolme; 2. Dennis Robinson	1. Dave O'Loughlin; 2. Derek Ridgley	1. Bruce Howlett; 2. Bonnie Fraser; 3. Trevor Hesse	1. David Ettridge; 2. Ashley Ettridge
Group D	Group K	Group U	Group W	Ungrouped
1. James Harker-Mortlock; 2. Kelly Lee Ferguson	1. Martin Zitek; 2. Robert Zitek	1. Tom Vogelgesang; 2. Don Nguyen	1. Nick Beams; 2. Terry Cook	Paul J Simpson; Jack Lord; Carole Carpenter; John Thompson

=== Northern Territory ===
Two Senate places were up for election. The Labor Party was defending one seat. The Country Liberal Party was defending one seat.

Labor	CLP	Greens	Democrat	Socialist Alliance	Ungrouped
1. **Trish Crossin***; 2. Wayne Connop	1. **Nigel Scullion***; 2. Bernadette Gregg	1. Mark Wakeham; 2. Shan McKenzie	1. Janeen Bulsey; 2. Fay Lawrence	1. Ray Hayes; 2. Kathy Newnam	Wayne Wright

=== Queensland ===
Six Senate places were up for election. The Labor Party was defending two seats. The Liberal Party was defending two seats. The Australian Democrats were defending one seat. One Nation was defending one seat. Senators Andrew Bartlett (Democrats), Ron Boswell (National), John Hogg (Labor), Ian Macdonald (Liberal), Claire Moore (Labor) and Santo Santoro (Liberal) were not up for re-election.

Labor	Liberal	Greens	Democrats	National
1. **Jan McLucas***; 2. **Joe Ludwig***; 3. Frank Gilbert	1. **Brett Mason***; 2. **George Brandis***; 3. Russell Trood*; 4. Sue Boyce	1. Drew Hutton; 2. Sarah Moles; 3. Theresa Millard	1. **John Cherry**; 2. Bonny Bauer	1. Barnaby Joyce*; 2. James Baker; 3. Stewart Gillies
Family First	One Nation	Hanson	Johnston	New Country
1. John Lewis; 2. Tracy Skellern-Smith	1. **Len Harris**; 2. Ian Nelson; 3. James Savage	1. Pauline Hanson; 2. Judy Smith	1. Hetty Johnston; 2. Diana Scott	1. Lorraine Wheeldon; 2. Rowell Walton
APA	Socialist Alliance	Fishing Party	CEC	Liberals for Forests
1. Tony Newman; 2. Darrell Morris	1. Sam Watson; 2. Nicole Clevens	1. Kevin Collins; 2. Darryl Whitford	1. Maurice Hetherington; 2. Ray Gillham	1. Joseph Clark; 2. Archie Chapman
HEMP	Non-Custodial Parents	Great Australians	Group A	Group D
1. Guy Freemarijuana; 2. Tony Kneipp	1. Geoff Webster; 2. Doug Thompson	1. John Rivett; 2. Mal McKenzie	1. Terry Rushton; 2. Eamon Coll	1. Selwyn Johnston; 2. Susan Harvey
Group G	Ungrouped			
1. Gail Duncan; 2. Kim McIntosh	Hassan Ghulam; Darryl McArthur			

=== South Australia ===
Six Senate places were up for election. The Labor Party was defending two seats. The Liberal Party was defending three seats. The Australian Democrats were defending one seat, although Senator Meg Lees had formed her own party, the Australian Progressive Alliance. Senators Grant Chapman (Liberal), Jeannie Ferris (Liberal), Robert Hill (Liberal), Linda Kirk (Labor), Natasha Stott Despoja (Democrats) and Penny Wong (Labor) were not up for re-election.

Labor	Liberal	National	Greens	Democrats
1. Anne McEwen*; 2. Annette Hurley*; 3. Dana Wortley*	1. **Nick Minchin***; 2. **Amanda Vanstone***; 3. **Alan Ferguson***; 4. Sue Lawrie	1. John Venus; 2. Julie Sippo; 3. Ian Willcourt	1. Brian Noone; 2. Clare McCarty; 3. Mij Tanith; 4. Sandy Montgomery	1. John McLaren; 2. Ruth Russell; 3. Tammy Franks; 4. Jenny Scott
Family First	Liberals for Forests	One Nation	APA	Socialist Alliance
1. Andrea Mason; 2. Tony Bates; 3. Toni Turnbull	1. Rita Hunt; 2. Rachael Barons	1. Andrew Phillips; 2. Basil Hille	1. **Meg Lees**; 2. Kirk Jones; 3. Jenny Macintosh	1. Tom Burtuleit; 2. Amy McDonald
Veterans	Group A	Group B	Group C	Group M
1. Nicholas McShane; 2. Jarrad Kay	1. Rolf Klotz; 2. Mark Smith; 3. Robyn Munro; 4. Ivan May	1. Kane Winther; 2. Claire Winther	1. Andrew Stanko; 2. Damian Woodards	1. Ben Yengi; 2. Allan Hutton
Group P	Ungrouped			
1. Ralph Hahnheuser; 2. Benno Lang	Richard Armour; John Lawrie; Richard Lutz			

=== Tasmania ===
Six Senate places are up for election. The Labor Party was defending three seats, although Senator Shayne Murphy had left the party to sit as an independent. The Liberal Party was defending two seats. One seat had been held by the independent senator Brian Harradine. Senators Bob Brown (Greens), Paul Calvert (Liberal), Richard Colbeck (Liberal), Sue Mackay (Labor), Nick Sherry (Labor) and John Watson (Liberal) were not up for re-election.

Labor	Liberal	Greens	Democrats	Family First
1. **Kerry O'Brien***; 2. Helen Polley*; 3. David Price; 4. Nicole Wells	1. **Eric Abetz***; 2. **Guy Barnett***; 3. Stephen Parry*	1. Christine Milne*; 2. Karen Cassidy; 3. Tom Millen	1. Yulia Onsman; 2. Suzanne Cass	1. Jacquie Petrusma; 2. Lance Bergman; 3. Lindsay Smith
Murphy	Harradine	CEC	Christian Democrats	Ungrouped
1. **Shayne Murphy**	1. Steve Martin; 2. John Newman	1. Rob Larner; 2. Adrian Watts	1. David Mitchell; 2. Michael Fracalossi	Rob Newitt; Ellen Gargan; Dino Ottavi; John McDonald

=== Victoria ===
Six Senate places were up for election. The Labor Party was defending three seats. The Liberal-National Coalition was defending three seats. Senators Lyn Allison (Democrats), Mitch Fifield (Liberal), Rod Kemp (Liberal), Gavin Marshall (Labor), Kay Patterson (Liberal) and Robert Ray (Labor) were not up for re-election.

Labor	Coalition	Greens	Democrats	Family First
1. **Kim Carr***; 2. **Steve Conroy***; 3. **Jacinta Collins**; 4. Marg Lewis	1. Michael Ronaldson* (Lib); 2. **Julian McGauran*** (Nat); 3. **Judith Troeth*** (Lib); 4. Dino De Marchi (Lib); 5. Jim Forbes (Lib); 6. Eugene Notermans (Lib)	1. David Risstrom; 2. Richard Di Natale; 3. Pamela Curr; 4. Liz Conor; 5. Sue Pennicuik; 6. Berhan Ahmed	1. Jess Healy; 2. Greg Chipp; 3. Tony Inglese; 4. Jo McCubbin	1. Steve Fielding*; 2. Danny Nalliah; 3. Annette Blaze; 4. Allan Meyer; 5. Ann Bown
One Nation	APA	Liberals for Forests	DLP	Socialist Alliance
1. Tim Foster; 2. James Neary	1. Chris Grigsby; 2. Charles Williams	1. Steve Clancy; 2. Rad Wintle	1. John Mulholland; 2. Pat Crea; 3. Gail King; 4. Rosemary Maurus; 5. Ken Wells	1. Lalitha Chelliah; 2. Sue Bolton
Christian Democrats	CEC	Non-Custodial Parents	Republican	Hope
1. Alan Barron; 2. Phil Seymour	1. Craig Isherwood; 2. Kelly-Ann Paull	1. Kevin Boers; 2. Brendan Hall	1. Peter Consandine; 2. Sheila Newman	1. Tim Petherbridge; 2. Lee-Anne Poynton
Veterans	ADP	Group K	Group S	Ungrouped
1. Roger Tozer; 2. Pam Brown	1. Graeme Cleaves; 2. Ian Kleeman	1. Joseph Toscano; 2. Steven Reghenzani	1. Richard Frankland; 2. Peter Phelps; 3. John Harding	Glenn Floyd; John Tibble; Che Endra Che-Kahn; Phillip Mason; Judi-ann Leggetts; David Buck; Barry Walters; Harald Dreger

=== Western Australia ===
Six Senate places were up for election. The Labor Party was defending two seats. The Liberal Party was defending three seats. The Australian Democrats were defending one seat. Senators Mark Bishop (Labor), Alan Eggleston (Liberal), David Johnston (Liberal), Ross Lightfoot (Liberal), Andrew Murray (Democrats) and Ruth Webber (Labor) were not up for re-election.

Labor	Liberal	National	Greens	Democrats
1. **Chris Evans***; 2. Glenn Sterle*; 3. Emiliano Barzotto	1. **Chris Ellison***; 2. **Ian Campbell***; 3. Judith Adams*; 4. Michelle Steck	1. Geoff Gill; 2. Norm Henning	1. Rachel Siewert*; 2. Colin Hughes; 3. Christopher Newall; 4. Felicity Peterson	1. **Brian Greig**; 2. Dominika Lisowski; 3. Jason Meotti
Family First	Christian Democrats	CEC	Liberals for Forests	One Nation
1. Nigel Irvine; 2. Don Hatch	1. Lachlan Dunjey; 2. Peter Watt; 3. Norman Gage	1. Jean Robinson; 2. Stuart Smith	1. Lesley McKay; 2. Vicki Taylor	1. James Hopkinson; 2. Ron McLean
APA	New Country	Non-Custodial Parents	Progressive Labour	Group A
1. Geoff Gibson; 2. Stephen Crabbe	1. Mal Harrington; 2. Brendan Mansell	1. Brian Taylor; 2. Geoff Dixon	1. Mary Lupi; 2. Lyn Kearsley	1. Alicia Curtis; 2. Steven Ogle
Ungrouped				
Julie Easton; Alexander Marsden; Jim Jardine				

== Summary by party ==
Beside each party is the number of seats contested by that party in the House of Representatives for each state, as well as an indication of whether the party contested the Senate election in the respective state.

Party	NSW		Vic		Qld		WA		SA		Tas		ACT		NT		Total	
Party	HR	S	HR	S	HR	S	HR	S	HR	S	HR	S	HR	S	HR	S	HR	S
Australian Labor Party	50	*	37	*	28	*	15	*	11	*	5	*	2	*	2	*	150	8
Liberal Party of Australia	42	*	35	*	23	*	15	*	11	*	5	*	2	*			133	7
National Party of Australia	10	*	3	*	7	*	1	*	1	*							22	5
Country Liberal Party															2	*	2	1
Australian Greens	50	*	37	*	28	*	15	*	11	*	5	*	2	*	2	*	150	8
Australian Democrats	38	*	29	*	28	*	15	*	11	*		*	2	*	2	*	125	8
Family First Party	24	*	37	*	28	*	3	*	11	*	5	*					108	6
Citizens Electoral Council	22	*	37	*	17	*	15	*	1		2	*	1		1		96	5
One Nation	31	*	3	*	19	*	15	*	10	*							78	5
Christian Democratic Party	22	*	1	*			11	*						*			34	4
Socialist Alliance	9	*	7	*	2	*	3			*	3		1			*	25	5
No GST Party	7	*	1														8	1
Liberals for Forests	7	*		*		*		*		*							7	5
New Country Party	1	*			3	*	3	*									7	3
Ex-Service, Service and Veterans Party	3	*	1	*	1					*							5	3
The Fishing Party	4	*				*				*							4	3
The Great Australians		*			4	*											4	2
Outdoor Recreation Party	4	*															4	1
Save the ADI Site Party	3	*															3	1
Non-Custodial Parents Party	2	*		*		*		*									2	4
Progressive Labour Party	2	*						*									2	2
Democratic Labor Party			2	*													2	1
HEMP Party		*			1	*											1	2
Aged and Disability Pensioners Party			1	*													1	1
Lower Excise Fuel and Beer Party	1	*															1	1
Nuclear Disarmament Party	1	*															1	1
Australian Progressive Alliance		*		*		*		*		*				*				6
Australians Against Further Immigration		*																1
Republican Party of Australia				*														1
Hope Party Australia				*														1
Brian Harradine Group												*						1
Independent and other	48		26		14		9		9						2		106	

== See also ==
- 2004 Australian federal election
- Members of the Australian House of Representatives, 2001–2004
- Members of the Australian House of Representatives, 2004–2007
- Members of the Australian Senate, 2002–2005
- Members of the Australian Senate, 2005–2008
- Candidates of the 2007 Australian federal election
- List of political parties in Australia
