= 2004 Australian federal election =

Election for the 41st Parliament of Australia

- 9 October 2004

All 150 seats in the House of Representatives 76 seats were needed for a majority in the House 40 (of the 76) seats in the Senate
- Registered: 13,098,461 ▲3.07%
- Turnout: 12,354,983 (94.32%) (▼0.53 pp)
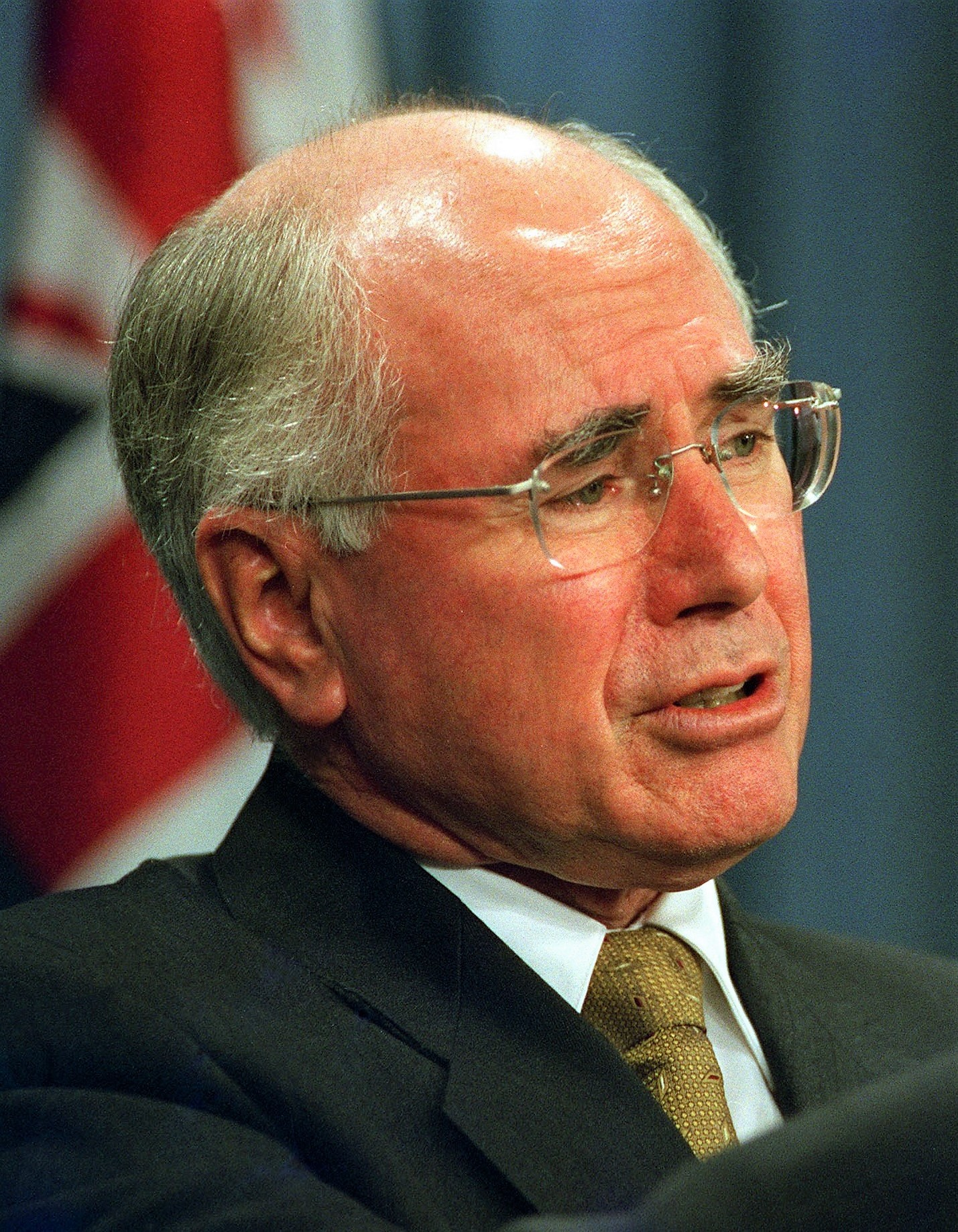

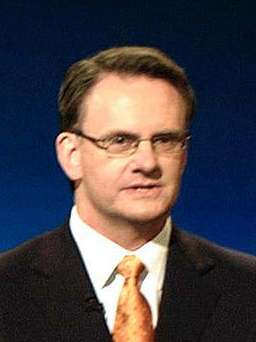
	First party	Second party
Leader	John Howard	Mark Latham
Party	Coalition	Labor
Leader since	30 January 1995	2 December 2003
Leader's seat	Bennelong (NSW)	Werriwa (NSW)
Last election	82 seats	65 seats
Seats won	87	60
Seat change	▲5	▼5
Primary vote	5,471,588	4,408,820
Percentage	46.71%	37.63%
Swing	▲3.79%	▼0.21%
TPP	52.74%	47.26%
TPP swing	▲1.79%	▼1.79%
- Results by division for the House of Representatives, shaded by winning party's margin of victory.
Prime Minister before election
John Howard
Liberal/National coalition
Subsequent Prime Minister
John Howard
Liberal/National coalition

A federal election was held on 9 October 2004 to elect members of the 41st Parliament of Australia. All 150 seats in the House of Representatives were up for election, along with 40 of the 76 seats in the Senate. The incumbent Liberal Party of Australia led by Prime Minister of Australia John Howard and coalition partner the National Party of Australia led by John Anderson defeated the opposition Australian Labor Party led by Mark Latham.

Both leaders were from the same city area, something which did not occur again until the 2022 election. Future Prime Minister Malcolm Turnbull entered Parliament in this election as the MP for Wentworth.

In the Senate election, a coalition of Liberal Party and the National Party (and one Country Liberal MP) won a majority of seats. This majority went into effect on July 1, 2005.

== Pre-election issues ==
In the wake of the 2002 Bali Bombings and the 2001 World Trade Center attacks, the Howard government along with the Blair and Bush governments, initiated combat operations in Afghanistan and an alliance for invading Iraq. Latham committed a Labor government to withdrawing Australian troops from Iraq by Christmas. At that time, Australia had about 850 troops in Iraq, mostly involved in patrol work and in training members of the new Iraqi defence forces. Howard accused Latham of a "cut and run" approach and said "it's not the Australian way not to stay the distance". Latham's initial commitment to withdraw from Iraq was seen as divisive, and potentially harmful to his chances of electoral success. In June 2004, Labor's "troops home by Christmas" policy came under fire from U.S. President George W. Bush who, at a White House press conference during Howard's visit to Washington DC, described it as "disastrous". Not only was Howard's staunch stance on Iraq and Afghanistan unappealing to Labor voters, but also some Liberals, including former president of the Liberal Party, John Valder, who during his time as president was a close Howard Ally. Valder's discontent led to him being closely involved with the 'Not Happy, John!' campaign, which sought to unseat Howard from his seat of Bennelong, hence making him ineligible to be prime minister.

The second issue was the ongoing and continued worsening of the Millennium Drought continued to bolster support for the Nationals water management policies of the Murray-Darling river system, diverting focus away from rural and inner-city community water supplies and focusing on Regional and Farmland water supplies.

== Campaign ==
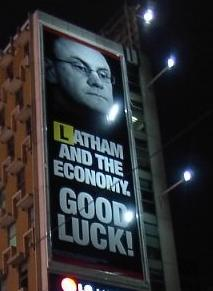
The Liberal-National coalition focused heavily on Latham's inexperience during the campaign (in Australia, yellow "L-plates" are attached to cars driven by learner drivers).

The Prime Minister, John Howard, announced the election at a press conference in Canberra on 29 August, after meeting the Governor-General, Michael Jeffery, at Government House.

=== "Who do you trust?" ===
Trust was a central theme of both the Liberal and Labor campaign platforms. In a press conference announcing that the election had been called for October 9th, Howard asked "Who do you trust to keep the economy strong and protect family living standards?" "Who do you trust to keep interest rates low? Who do you trust to lead the fight on Australia's behalf against international terrorism?"

Howard, who turned 65 in July, declined to answer questions about whether he would serve a full three-year term if his government was re-elected. "I will serve as long as my party wants me to," he said.

At a press conference in Sydney half an hour after Howard's announcement, Opposition Leader Mark Latham welcomed the election, saying the Howard government had been in power too long. He said the main issue would be truth in government. "We've had too much dishonesty from the Howard Government", he said. "The election is about trust. The Government has been dishonest for too long."

=== Initial polling ===
The campaign began with Labor leading in all published national opinion polls. On 31 August, Newspoll published in The Australian newspaper gave Labor a lead of 52% to 48% nationwide, which would translate into a comfortable win for Labor in terms of seats. Most commentators, however, expected the election to be very close, pointing out that Labor was also ahead in the polls at the comparable point of the 1998 election, which Howard won. Howard had also consistently out-polled Latham as preferred prime minister by an average of 11.7 percentage points in polls taken this year.

After the first week of campaigning, a Newspoll conducted for News Corporation newspapers indicated that the Coalition held a lead on a two-party-preferred basis of 52% to 48% in the government's 12 most marginal held seats. To secure government in its own right, Labor needed to win twelve more seats than in the 2001 election. In the same poll, John Howard increased his lead over Mark Latham as preferred prime minister by four points. The Taverner Research poll conducted for The Sun-Herald newspaper revealed that younger voters were more likely to support Labor, with 41% of those aged 18 to 24 supporting Labor, compared with 36% who support the Coalition.

=== Jakarta embassy bombing ===
On 9 September, during the second week of campaigning the election was rocked by a terrorist attack on the Australian embassy in Jakarta, Indonesia. John Howard expressed his "utter dismay at this event" and dispatched Foreign Minister Alexander Downer to Jakarta to assist in the investigation. Mark Latham committed the Labor party's "full support to all efforts by the Australian and Indonesian governments to ensure that happens". The parties reached an agreement that campaigning would cease for 10 September out of respect for the victims of this attack and that this would be in addition to the cessation of campaigning already agreed upon for 11 September in remembrance of the terrorist attacks in 2001.

=== Leader's debate ===
A debate between John Howard and Mark Latham was televised commercial-free on the Nine Network at 7:30pm on Sunday 12 September. In a change from previous election debates, which involved a single moderator, the leaders were questioned by a five-member panel representing each of the major media groups in Australia. There was a representative from commercial television (Laurie Oakes), the ABC (Jim Middleton), News Limited (Malcolm Farr), John Fairfax Holdings (Michelle Grattan) and radio (Neil Mitchell). After an opening address, Howard and Latham responded to questions posed by the panel and had the opportunity to make a closing statement. The Nine Network permitted other television organisations to transmit the feed, but only the ABC chose to.

The debate was followed (only on the Nine Network) by an analysis of the leaders' performance by the "worm". The worm works by analysing the approval or disapproval of a select group of undecided voters to each statement that a leader makes. Throughout the debate, according to the worm, Latham performed strongly and Howard performed poorly. A final poll of the focus group found that 67% of the focus group believed that Latham won the debate and that 33% of the focus group believed that Howard won. Major media outlets generally agreed that Latham had won the debate, although they pointed out that with no further debates scheduled and nearly four weeks of the campaign remaining, Latham's gain in the momentum from the debate was unlikely to be decisive. Political commentators noted that the 2001 election debate, between Howard and then opposition leader Kim Beazley, gave the same worm results yet Labor still lost that election.

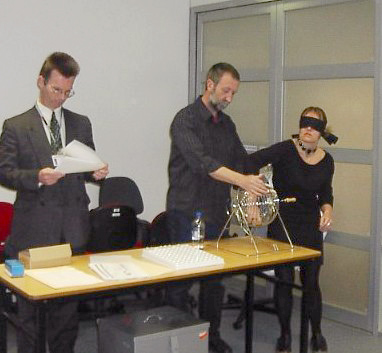
Officials of the Australian Electoral Commission conduct a blind ballot to determine the order of candidates on the House of Representatives ballot paper in the Division of Melbourne Ports, 17 September 2004

=== Campaign midpoint ===
By the midpoint of the campaign, after Labor had released its policies on taxation and education, polls showed that the election was still too close to call. The Newspoll in The Australian, showed (21 September) Labor leading with 52.5% of the two-party-preferred vote. The ACNielsen poll published in The Sydney Morning Herald and The Age showed the Coalition ahead on 52%. The Morgan poll, which has a poor recent record of predicting federal elections, showed Labor ahead with 53% on the weekend of 18–19 September. A Galaxy Poll in the Melbourne Herald Sun showed the Coalition ahead with 51%, but showed Labor gaining ground.

Despite Latham's strong performance in the debate, most political commentators argued that he had not gained a clear advantage over Howard. They pointed to anomalies in Labor's tax policy and the controversy surrounding Labor's policy of reducing government funding to some non-government schools as issues which Howard was successfully exploiting.

John Howard and John Anderson launched the Coalition election campaign at a joint function in Brisbane on 26 September. Howard's policy speech can be read at the Liberal Party website. Anderson's policy speech can be read at the National Party website.

Mark Latham's policy speech was delivered, also in Brisbane, on 29 September.

=== Midpoint polling ===
During the fourth week of the campaign contradictory polls continued to appear. The ACNielsen poll published in The Sydney Morning Herald and The Age on 25 September showed the Coalition ahead with 54%, which would translate into a large majority for the government. The Newspoll in The Australian on 28 September showed Labor ahead with 52%, which would give Labor a comfortable majority.

=== Tasmanian forests logging ===
In the last days of the campaign the environment policies regarding the logging of Tasmania's old-growth forests were released by both major parties, but too late for the Greens to adjust their preference flows on how-to-vote cards in most electorates as the majority were already printed. In the game of "cat and mouse" on Tasmanian forest policy between Mark Latham and John Howard, Latham eventually lost out when Dick Adams (Labor member for the Tasmanian seat of Lyons), Tasmanian Labor Premier Paul Lennon and CFMEU's Tasmanian secretary Scott McLean all attacked Latham's forest policy. At a timber workers' rally on the day Labor's forestry policy was announced, Scott McLean asked those gathered to pass a resolution of no confidence in Mr Latham's ability to lead the country. Michael O'Connor, assistant national secretary of the CFMEU said the Coalition's forest policy represented a much better deal for his members than Labor's policy. Australian Labor Party national president Carmen Lawrence later said that "Labor has only itself to blame for the backlash over its forestry policy" and that it was a strategic mistake to release the policy so late in the election campaign. She stated that she was disappointed in criticism from within the ALP and union movement, and that the party did not leave itself enough time to sell the package.

Treasury and the Department of Finance reported on the validity of Labor's costings of their promises. They claimed to identify a different flaw to that identified by Liberal Treasurer Costello, but overall Labor was satisfied with the report.

=== The handshake ===
On the morning of 8 October, the day before the election, a television crew filmed Latham and Howard shaking hands as they crossed paths outside an Australian Broadcasting Corporation radio studio in Sydney. The footage showed Latham appearing to draw Howard towards him and tower over his shorter opponent. The incident received wide media coverage and, while Latham claimed to have been attempting to get revenge for Howard squeezing his wife's hand too hard at a press function, it was variously reported as being "aggressive", "bullying" and "intimidating" on the part of Latham. The Liberal Party campaign director, Brian Loughnane, later said this incident generated more feedback to Liberal headquarters than anything else during the six-week campaign, and that it "brought together all the doubts and hesitations that people had about Mark Latham". Latham disputes the impact of this incident, however, having described it as a "Tory gee-up: we got close to each other, sure, but otherwise it was a regulation man's handshake. It's silly to say it cost us votes – my numbers spiked in the last night of our polling." (Latham Diaries, p. 369) According to Latham's account of events, Latham came in close to Howard for the handshake to prevent Howard shaking with his arm rather than his wrist.

=== Final opinion polls ===
The final opinion polls continued to be somewhat contradictory, with Newspoll showing a 50–50 tie and the Fairfax papers reporting 54–46 to the Coalition. Most Australian major daily newspaper editorials backed a return of the Howard government, with the notable exceptions of The Sydney Morning Herald, which backed neither party, and The Canberra Times, which backed Labor.

== Preference deals ==
As in all Australian elections, the flow of preferences from minor parties can be crucial in determining the outcome. The close of nominations was followed by a period of bargaining among the parties. Howard made a pitch for the preferences of the Australian Greens by appearing to offer concessions on the issue of logging in old-growth forests in Tasmania, and the Coalition directed its preferences to the Greens ahead of Labor in the Senate, but the Greens nevertheless decided to allocate preferences to Labor in most electorates. In exchange, Labor agreed to direct its preferences in the Senate to the Greens ahead of the Democrats (but critically, not ahead of other minor parties), increasing the chances that the Greens would displace Australian Democrats Senators in New South Wales, Queensland and Western Australia.

The Democrats in turn did a preference deal with the Family First Party, which angered some Democrats supporters who viewed Family First's policies as incompatible with the Democrats'.

=== Senate ===
In Victoria, Family First, the Christian Democrats and the DLP allocated their senate preferences to Labor, to help ensure the re-election of the number three Labor Senate candidate, Jacinta Collins, a Catholic who has conservative views on some social issues such as abortion. In exchange, Labor gave its Senate preferences in Victoria to Family First ahead of the Greens, expecting Family First to be eliminated before these preferences were distributed. In the event, however, Labor and Democrat preferences helped Family First's Steve Fielding beat the Greens' David Risstrom to win the last Victorian Senate seat and become Family First's first federal parliamentarian. This outcome generated some controversy and highlighted a lack of transparency in preference deals. Family First were elected in Victoria after receiving 1.88% of the vote, even though the Greens had the largest minor party share of the vote with 8.8%. In Australia, 95% of voters vote "above the line" in the Senate. Many "above the line" voters do not access preference allocation listings, although they are available in polling booths and on the AEC website, so they are therefore unaware of where their vote may go. The result was one Family First, three Liberal and two Labor Senators elected in Victoria.

In Tasmania, Family First and the Democrats also directed their Senate preferences to Labor, apparently to preclude the possibility of the Liberals winning a majority in the Senate and thus reducing the influence of the minor parties. The Australian Greens' Christine Milne appeared at risk of losing her Senate seat to a Family First candidate shortly after election night, despite nearly obtaining the full required quota of primary votes. However, strong performance on postal and prepoll votes improved Milne's position. It was only the high incidence of "below the line" voting in Tasmania that negated the effect of the preference swap deal between Labor and Family First. The result was one Green, three Liberal and two Labor Senators elected in Tasmania.

In New South Wales, Democrat preferences flowing to Labor rather than the Greens were instrumental in Labor's winning of the last Senate seat. Had Democrat preferences flown to the Greens rather than Liberals for Forests and the Christian Democrats, then the final vacancy would have been won by the Greens' John Kaye. The scale of Glenn Druery's (of the Liberals for Forests party) preference deals was revealed by the large number of ticket votes distributed when he was eliminated from the count. He gained preferences from a wide range of minor parties such as the Ex-Service Service and Veterans Party, the Outdoor Recreation Party, and the Non-Custodial Parents Party. Liberals for Forests also gained the preferences of two leftish parties – the Progressive Labour Party and the HEMP Party. When Druery was eventually excluded, these preferences flowed to the Greens, but the Greens would rather have received the preferences earlier in the count. In the end, three Liberal/National Senators and three Labor Senators were elected in New South Wales.

In Western Australia, the Greens' Rachel Siewert was elected to the final vacancy after the final Labor candidate was excluded. This was a gain for the Greens at the expense of the Democrats Brian Greig. While the Democrats had done a preference swap with Family First, the deal in Western Australia did not include the Christian Democrats. As a result, when the Australian Democrats were excluded from the count, their preferences flowed to the Greens, putting them on track for the final vacancy. The result was one Green, three Liberal and two Labor Senators elected in Western Australia.

In South Australia, the Australian Democrats negotiated a crucial preference swap with Family First that prevented the Greens winning the final vacancy. If the Democrats had polled better, they would have collected Family First and Liberal preferences and won the final vacancy. Former Democrat Leader Meg Lees also contested the Senate in South Australia, but was eliminated late in the count. However, Lees did have some impact on the outcome, as there were large numbers of below the line preferences for both the Progressive Alliance (as well as One Nation) which were widely spread rather than flowing to the Democrats. When the Democrats were excluded, preferences flowed to Family First which prevented the Greens' Brian Noone passing the third Labor candidate. This resulted in a seat that could otherwise have been won by the Greens instead being won by Labor on Green preferences. The flow of One Nation preferences to Labor made it impossible for either Family First or the Liberal Party to win the final vacancy. Labor's Dana Wortley was elected to the final vacancy. The result in South Australia was split 3 Liberal, 3 Labor.

In Queensland, Pauline Hanson attracted 38,000 below the line votes and pulled away from One Nation. Preferences from the Fishing Party kept the National Party's Barnaby Joyce ahead of Family First and Pauline Hanson. Joyce then unexpectedly won the fifth vacancy ahead of the Liberal Party. The sixth and last vacancy was then won by Liberal Russell Trood. The outcome was 1 National, 3 Liberals and 2 Labor.

The election of both Barnaby Joyce and Russell Trood to the Senate in Queensland resulted in the Coalition gaining control of the Senate and was confirmed by the National Party's Senate Leader Ron Boswell's in a televised telephone call to Prime Minister John Howard. This result was not widely predicted prior to the election.

=== House of Representatives ===
Despite constant media attention on preference deals, and a widely held belief that the two party preferred result for the election would be close, the Newspoll figures during the three months prior to the election showed little alteration in the first preference margin between the parties, nor was there any evidence of any voter volatility. The figures suggested, then, that as the Coalition's first preference vote was healthy, the most likely result was a Government victory. This was born out in the election results when the Liberal first preference vote of 40.5 per cent was 3.4 percentage points higher than in 2001, while Labor's first-preference vote of 37.6 per cent was its lowest since the elections of 1931 and 1934. Preference flows from minor parties are much more likely to affect an election outcome when the two major parties are close. The collapse of Labor's primary vote therefore negated this effect, even though 61 out of 150 House of Representatives seats were decided on preferences.

The national outcome of minor party preference distributions (in order of number primary votes received) is summarised in the following table:

Minor party	Total votes	% to Liberal/National Coalition	% to Labor
Christian Democratic Party	72,241	74.63	25.37
Citizens Electoral Council	42,349	47.83	52.17
Socialist Alliance	14,155	25.55	74.45
New Country Party	9,439	59.16	40.84
Liberals for Forests	8,165	60.18	39.82
No GST	7,802	38.11	61.89
Ex-Service, Service and Veterans Party	4,369	52.69	47.31
Progressive Labour Party	3,775	19.36	80.64
Outdoor Recreation Party	3,505	44.37	55.63
Save the ADI Site Party	3,490	33.12	66.88
The Great Australians	2,824	61.47	38.53
The Fishing Party	2,516	45.15	54.85
Lower Excise Fuel and Beer Party	2,007	52.96	47.04
Democratic Labor Party	1,372	58.53	41.47
Non-Custodial Parents Party	1,132	26.86	73.14
HEMP	787	41.93	58.07
Nuclear Disarmament Party	341	20.82	79.18
Aged and Disability Pensioners Party	285	45.96	54.04

== Party leaders ==
- John Howard had been an MP since 1974, leader of the Liberal Party since 1995 (he was previously leader from 1985 to 1989), and prime minister since March 1996. He turned 65 in July 2004, and is more than 20 years older than Mark Latham. Howard is by far the most experienced politician in Australian federal politics and is considered a master of political strategy, a reputation which was enhanced during the 2004 campaign. Although most commentators agreed that he did not perform well in the debate with Latham, his dogged campaigning on interest rates, economic certainty and national security was effective in persuading voters in marginal seats to stick with the Coalition.
- John Anderson had been an MP since 1988 and leader of the National Party and Deputy Prime Minister since 1999. Although talented and personable, he was unable to stem the long-term decline in the Nationals' rural electoral base. During 2003 he considered retiring from Parliament at this election, but was persuaded not to. Despite his personal standing, the Nationals lost another seat (Richmond) and struggled to win a Senate spot in Queensland. Anderson stepped down as leader in July 2005.
- Mark Latham had been an MP since 1994 and was elected leader of the Australian Labor Party in December 2003. Latham initially made a good impression, but a series of controversies during 2004 caused much criticism of his alleged inconsistency and volatility. His campaign was aggressive and colourful, with a series of bold policy announcements late in the campaign. This galvanised Labor's base but many commentators felt that Latham's policies and personality alienated middle-class voters. In retrospect Labor's forests policy was a major miscalculation, costing two seats in Tasmania. Latham also failed to effectively counter Howard's campaign on interest rates. Latham resigned for health reasons in January 2005 from both his position as Leader of the Opposition and as Member for Werriwa in the House of Representatives.
- Andrew Bartlett had been a Senator since 1997 and leader of the Australian Democrats since 2002 when Natasha Stott Despoja stood down from the position. The efforts to revive the Democrats' public support were unsuccessful. A widely publicised incident in December 2003 where he confronted Liberal Senator Jeannie Ferris while exiting the Senate chamber did not help these efforts. The Democrats' election result in 2004 was the worst in the party's history to that time. He chose not to recontest the leadership after that election, and Senator Lyn Allison took on the leadership role.
- Bob Brown had been a Senator and the informal leader of the Australian Greens since 1996. By opposing Australia's participation in the Iraq War he established himself as the most prominent figure of the Australian left. But media predictions that the Greens would greatly increase their vote and win a Senate seat in every state, or even win House seats, were not realised. Although the Greens took some votes from the Democrats, many flowed to other parties and the predicted big inroads into Labor's base vote did not occur.

== Disclosure ==
Dates for financial disclosure for the 2004 federal election were specified by the Australian Electoral Commission. Broadcasters and publishers had to lodge their returns by 6 December, while candidates and Senate groups needed to lodge by 24 January 2005. This information was made available for public scrutiny on 28 March 2005.

== Results ==
The Australian Greens replaced the Australian Democrats as the largest third party in this election. As of 2025 The Greens hold its position as the third largest party.

=== House of Representatives ===
Government (87) Coalition Liberal (74) National (12) CLP (1) Opposition (60) Labor (60) Crossbench (3) Independent (3)

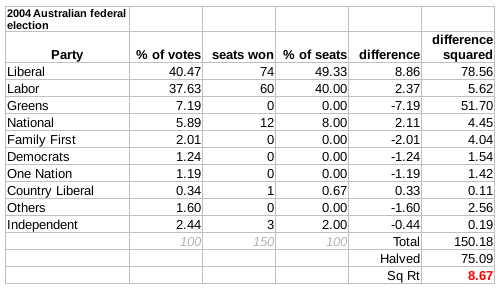
The disproportionality of the lower house in the 2004 election was 8.67 according to the Gallagher Index, mainly between the Liberal and Green Parties.

House of Representatives (IRV) — Turnout 94.69% (CV) — Informal 5.18%
Party	Votes	%	Swing	Seats	Change
Liberal	4,741,458	40.47	+3.39	74	▲6
National	690,275	5.89	+0.28	12	▼1
Country Liberal	39,855	0.34	+0.02	1	Steady
Liberal–National coalition	5,471,588	46.71	+3.79	87	▲5
Labor	4,409,117	37.64	–0.20	60	▼5 (Note: Stephen Martin (Labor) had won Cunningham at the 2001 election, however he resigned in 2002 and Michael Organ (Greens) won the seat at the resulting by-election.)
Greens	841,734	7.19	+2.23	0	Steady
Family First	235,315	2.01	+2.01		
Democrats	144,832	1.24	–4.17		
One Nation	139,956	1.19	–3.15		
Others	472,590	4.03	–0.06	3 (Note: The independents were Peter Andren, Tony Windsor and Bob Katter.)	Steady
Total	11,715,132			150	
Two-party-preferred vote
Coalition	6,179,130	52.74	+1.79	87	▲5
Labor	5,536,002	47.26	–1.79	60	▼5
Invalid/blank votes	639,851	5.18	+0.36		
Registered voters/turnout	13,098,461	94.32			
Source: Commonwealth Election 2004

Popular vote
Liberal	40.47%
Labor	37.63%
Greens	7.19%
National	5.89%
Family First	2.01%
Democrats	1.24%
One Nation	1.19%
CLP	0.34%
Other	4.03%

Two-party-preferred vote
Coalition	52.74%
Labor	47.26%

Parliament seats
Coalition	58.00%
Labor	40.00%
Independents	2.00%

=== Senate ===
Government (39) Coalition Liberal (33) National (5) CLP (1) Opposition (28) Labor (28) Crossbench (9) Greens (4) Democrats (4) Family First (1)

Senate (STV GV) — Turnout 94.82% (CV) — Informal 3.75%
Party	Votes	%	±	Seats			
Party	Votes	%	±	Seats won	Not up	New total	Seat change
Liberal/National Coalition							
Liberal/National joint ticket	3,074,952	25.72	+1.85	6	6	12	▲1
Liberal	2,109,948	17.65	+1.96	13	11	24	▲2
National	163,261	1.37	−0.55	1	1	2	▲1
Country Liberal (NT)	41,923	0.35	+0.00	1	0	1	Steady
Coalition total	5,390,084	45.09	+3.26	21	18	39	▲4
Labor	4,186,715	35.02	+0.70	16	12	28	Steady
Greens	916,431	7.67	+2.73	2	2	4	▲2
Democrats	250,373	2.09	-5.16	0	4	4	▼4
Family First	210,567	1.76	+1.76	1	0	1	▲1
One Nation	206,455	1.73	-3.81	0	0	0	▼1
Others	792,994	6.65	+1.31	0	0	0	▼2 (Note: Both independent senators were from Tasmania. Brian Harradine did not contest the election while Labor turned independent Shayne Murphy was not re-elected.)
Total	11,953,649	100.00	–	40	36	76	
Invalid/blank votes	466,370	3.75	−0.14	–	–	–	–
Registered voters/turnout	12,420,019	94.82	-0.38	–	–	–	–
Source: Upper house results: AEC

== House of Representatives preference flows ==
- The Nationals had candidates in 9 seats where three-cornered-contests existed, with 84.70% of preferences favouring the Liberal Party.
- The Greens contested all 150 electorates with preferences strongly favouring Labor (80.86%)
- Family First contested 109 electorates with preferences favouring the Liberal/National Coalition (66.57%)
- The Democrats contested 125 electorates with preferences slightly favouring Labor (58.91%)
- One Nation contested 77 electorates with preferences slightly favouring the Liberal/National Coalition (56.4%)

== Seats changing hands ==
In the House of Representatives, the Coalition won eight seats from Labor: Bass (Tas), Bonner (Qld), Braddon (Tas), Greenway (NSW), Hasluck (WA), Kingston (SA), Stirling (WA) and Wakefield (SA). Labor won four seats from the Coalition: Adelaide (SA), Hindmarsh (SA), Parramatta (NSW) and Richmond (NSW). The Coalition thus had a net gain of four seats. The redistribution had also delivered them McMillan (Vic), formerly held by Christian Zahra of Labor and won by Liberal Russell Broadbent; and Bowman (Qld), formerly held by Labor's Con Sciacca and won by Liberal Andrew Laming. Labor, meanwhile, received the new seat of Bonner (Qld) and the redistributed Wakefield (SA), both of which were lost to the Liberal Party. The Labor Party regained the seat of Cunningham, which had been lost to the Greens in a by-election in 2002.

Seat	2001			Notional Margin (Note: For seats that werre affected by the redistribution the Australian Electoral Commission calculated "notional" margins for the redistributed divisions by modelling the outcome of the previous election as if the new boundaries had been in place.)	Swing	2004		
Seat	Party	Member	Margin	Notional Margin	Swing	Margin	Member	Party
Adelaide, SA	Liberal	Trish Worth	0.22	0.62	1.95	1.33	Kate Ellis	Labor
Bass, Tas	Labor	Michelle O'Byrne	2.06		4.69	2.63	Michael Ferguson	Liberal
Bonner, Qld	Labor	New seat		1.9	2.40	0.51	Ross Vasta	Liberal
Bowman, Qld	Labor	Con Sciacca	1.42	−3.1 (Note: Bowman had become a notional Liberal seat as a result of the redistribution.)	6.0	9.12	Andrew Laming	Liberal
Braddon, Tas	Labor	Sid Sidebottom	5.96		7.09	1.13	Mark Baker	Liberal
Cunningham, NSW	Labor	Stephen Martin	10.65		+0.81	11.46	Sharon Bird	Labor
Cunningham, NSW	Greens	Michael Organ	2.23		N/A	11.46	Sharon Bird	Labor
Greenway, NSW	Labor	Frank Mossfield	3.11		3.69	0.58	Louise Markus	Liberal
Hasluck, WA	Labor	Sharryn Jackson	1.78		3.60	1.82	Stuart Henry	Liberal
Hindmarsh, SA	Liberal	Chris Gallus	0.63	1.1	1.2	0.06	Steve Georganas	Labor
Kingston, SA	Labor	David Cox		1.35	1.42	0.07	Kym Richardson	Liberal
McMillan, Vic	Labor	Christian Zahra	1.89	−2.9 (Note: McMillan had become a notional Liberal seat as a result of the redistribution.)	2.15	4.99	Russell Broadbent	Liberal
Parramatta, NSW	Liberal	Ross Cameron	1.15		1.92	0.77	Julie Owens	Labor
Richmond, NSW	National	Larry Anthony	1.68		1.87	0.19	Justine Elliot	Labor
Stirling, WA	Labor	Jann McFarlane	1.58		3.62	2.04	Michael Keenan	Liberal
Wakefield, SA	Liberal	Neil Andrew	14.57	−1.5 (Note: Wakefield had become a notional Labor seat as a result of the redistribution.)	1.93	0.67	David Fawcett	Liberal

== Analysis ==
The Coalition parties won 46.7% of the primary vote, a gain of 3.7% over the 2001 election. The opposition Australian Labor Party polled 37.6%, a loss of 0.2 percentage points. The Australian Greens emerged as the most prominent minor party, polling 7.2%, a gain of 2.2 points. Both the Australian Democrats and One Nation had their vote greatly reduced. After a notional distribution of preferences, the Australian Electoral Commission estimated that the Coalition had polled 52.74% of the two-party-preferred vote, a gain of 1.7 points from 2001.

The Liberal Party won 74 seats, the National Party 12 seats and the Country Liberal Party (the Northern Territory branch of the Liberal Party) one seat, against the Labor opposition's 60 seats. Three independent members were re-elected. The Coalition also won 39 seats in the 76-member Senate, making the Howard government the first government to have a majority in the Senate since 1981. The size of the government's win was unexpected: few commentators had predicted that the coalition would actually increase its majority in the House of Representatives, and almost none had foreseen its gaining a majority in the Senate. Even Howard had described that feat as "a big ask".

The election result was a triumph for Howard, who in December 2004 became Australia's second-longest-serving prime minister, and who saw the election result as a vindication of his policies, particularly his decision to join in the 2003 invasion of Iraq. The results were a setback for the Labor leader, Mark Latham, and contributed to his resignation in January 2005 after assuming the leadership from Simon Crean in 2003. The defeat made Labor's task more difficult: a provisional pendulum for the House of Representatives, showed that Labor would need to win 16 seats to win the following election. However, Kim Beazley said that the accession of Latham to the ALP leadership, in December 2003, had rescued the party from a much heavier defeat. Beazley stated that polling a year before the election indicated that the ALP would lose "25–30 seats" in the House of Representatives. Instead the party lost a net four seats in the House, a swing of 0.21 percentage points. There was also a 1.1-point swing to the ALP in the Senate. The Coalition gaining control of the Senate was enabled by a collapse in first preferences for the Australian Democrats and One Nation.

Members and Senators defeated in the election include Larry Anthony, the National Party Minister for Children and Youth Affairs, defeated in Richmond, New South Wales; former Labor minister Con Sciacca, defeated in Bonner, Queensland; Liberal Parliamentary Secretaries Trish Worth (Adelaide, South Australia) and Ross Cameron (Parramatta, New South Wales); and Democrat Senators Aden Ridgeway (the only indigenous member of the outgoing Parliament), Brian Greig and John Cherry. Liberal Senator John Tierney (New South Wales), who was dropped to number four on the Coalition Senate ticket, was also defeated.

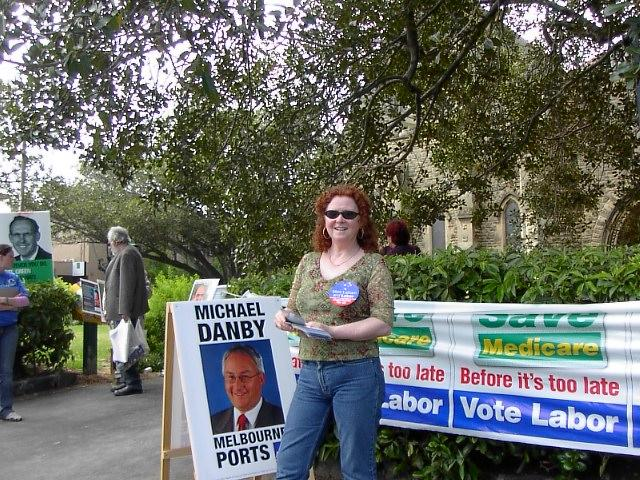
A party worker for the Australian Labor Party hands out how-to-vote cards at a polling place in St Kilda, Victoria, in the Division of Melbourne Ports, on election day, 9 October 2004.

Celebrity candidates Peter Garrett (Labor, Kingsford Smith, New South Wales) and Malcolm Turnbull (Liberal, Wentworth, New South Wales) easily won their contests. Prominent clergyman Fred Nile failed to win a Senate seat in New South Wales. The first Muslim candidate to be endorsed by a major party in Australia, Ed Husic, failed to win the seat of Greenway, New South Wales, for Labor. The former One Nation leader, Pauline Hanson, failed in her bid to win a Senate seat in Queensland as an independent.

Minor parties had mixed results. The Australian Democrats polled their lowest vote since their creation in 1977, and did not retain any of the three Senate seats they were defending. The Australian Greens won their first Senate seat in Western Australia and retained the Seat they were defending in Tasmania. They did not achieve a widely expected Senate Seat in Victoria, due to fellow progressive parties, the Australian Labor Party and The Australian Democrats, as well as some micro parties, joining with the conservative parties in a preference deal with far-right evangelist Christian party Family First, which despite a popular vote of just 1.7% received so many preferences from the unsuccessful Candidates of other parties that it eventually overtook the Greens David Risstrom's 7.4% vote and claimed that Senate Seat. As predicted, the Greens did not gain Senate seats in Queensland or South Australia, partly because of similar preference deals by fellow progressive parties, but also because of a traditionally lower vote in these States. Predictably, the Greens lost their first and (at the time) only Lower House seat of Cunningham, which they had gained by way of an electoral anomaly at the 2002 by-election in that Seat, which when The Liberal Party did not provide a Candidate, caused atypical voting patterns, overwhelmingly amongst voters who would normally have voted for The Liberals and did not want to vote for their traditional nemeses, The Labor Party.

The Australian Progressive Alliance leader, Senator Meg Lees, and the One Nation parliamentary leader, Senator Len Harris, lost their seats. One Nation's vote in the House of Representatives collapsed. The Christian Democratic Party, the Citizens Electoral Council, the Democratic Labor Party, the Progressive Labour Party and the Socialist Alliance all failed to make any impact. The Family First Party polled 2% of the vote nationally, and their candidate Steve Fielding won a Senate seat in Victoria.

== See also ==
- Candidates of the 2004 Australian federal election
- Members of the Australian House of Representatives, 2004–2007
- Members of the Australian Senate, 2005–2008

== Bibliography ==
- University of WA election results in Australia since 1890
- AEC 2PP vote
- AustralianPolitics.com election details
- "Australian Idol beats election debate". The Age. 14 September 2004.
- "Family First weighs in on key issues". The Sydney Morning Herald. 11 October 2004.
- "ALP hurt by forests fire". The Age. 11 October 2004. Archived from the original on 9 December 2005.
- "Howard trades trees for jobs". The Age. 7 October 2004. Archived from the original on 15 September 2011.
- Union official may be dumped in election fallout (14 October 2004). ABC News Online.
- Forestry policy too rushed, Labor president says (12 October 2004). ABC News Online.
- "How party preferences picked Family First". The Age. 11 October 2004.
