= Aged and Disability Pensioners Party =

Former Australian political party

The Aged and Disability Pensioners Party was a minor Australian political party that contested the 2004 federal election. The party was established on 13 December 2001. It supported the rights of pensioners. It was dissolved on 18 January 2006.
