= Save the ADI Site Party =

- Founded: 4 October 2001
- Dissolved: 26 August 2005

The Save the ADI Site Party was a minor Australian political party that was registered with the AEC on 4 October 2001. The party fielded several candidates in both the 2001 and the 2004 federal elections. Its main platform was the protection of bushland in western Sydney owned by Australian Defence Industries (well known locally as the ADI site). It directed preferences to the Australian Greens, but to the Liberal Party ahead of the Labor Party, owing to the significant part a number of Penrith City Labor councillors had played in the proposed development. The party was voluntarily deregistered on 26 August 2005.
