= Progressive Labour Party (Australia) =

- National President: Rod Noble
- Founded: 1996
- Dissolved: 2021
- Merged into: Australian Progressives
- Ideology: Democratic socialism Progressivism
- Political position: Left-wing

Website
- www.progressivelabour.org

The Progressive Labour Party (PLP) was a left-wing political party in Australia. In 2021, it merged into the Australian Progressives.

== History ==
The party was founded by dissident former members of the Australian Labor Party and the original Communist Party of Australia in 1996. The party claimed that the ALP has abandoned its traditional working-class supporters as it has moved towards the political right. The party ran Senate tickets in New South Wales and Western Australia and contested several House of Representatives seats at the 9 October 2004 election.

The party regularly made submissions to Senate and other committees on a broad range of issues.

Rod Noble, the national secretary of the Progressive Labour Party, described the Progressive Labor Party as a "broad alliance" of socialists. Blogger Andy Fleming stated the group has "been largely eclipsed" since the formation of Socialist Alliance. The party was de-registered by the Australian Electoral Commission in December 2006. The party merged with the Australian Progressives in 2021, with the merged party being deregistered due to having insufficient members the following year.
