= Lower Excise Fuel and Beer Party =

Australian political party

The Lower Excise Fuel and Beer Party was a minor Australian political party registered on 17 September 2001. It was deregistered by the Australian Electoral Commission on 19 December 2005. The party fielded several candidates in the 2001 and 2004 federal elections. Its main policies included repealing the Goods and Services Tax and lowering the excise on fuel and beer prices. Many of its policies were centre-left. It was founded by David O'Loughlin, a Coffs Harbour resident.
