= Results of the 2010 Australian federal election in Tasmania =

2010 Australian federal election (Tasmania)
| ← 2007 | 21 August 2010 | 2013 → |

All 5 Tasmanian seats in the Australian House of Representatives and 6 (of the 12) seats in the Australian Senate
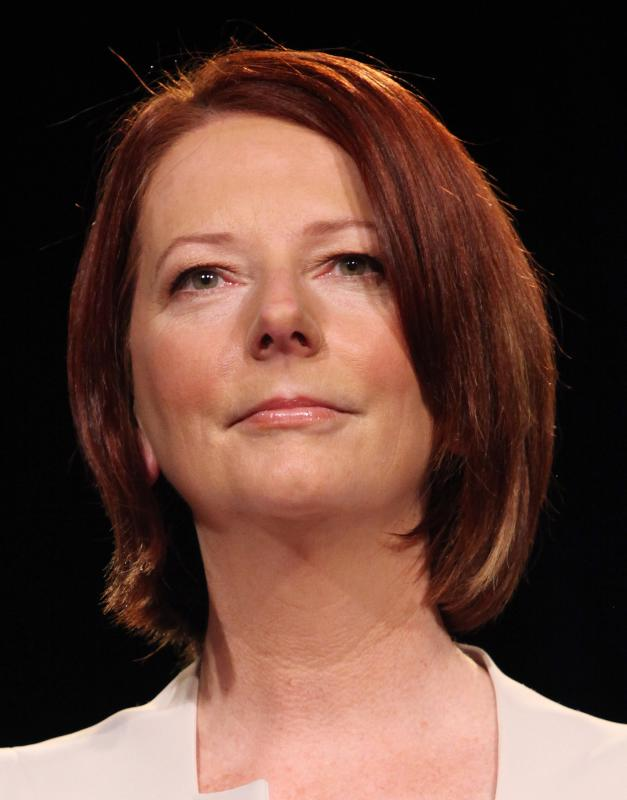

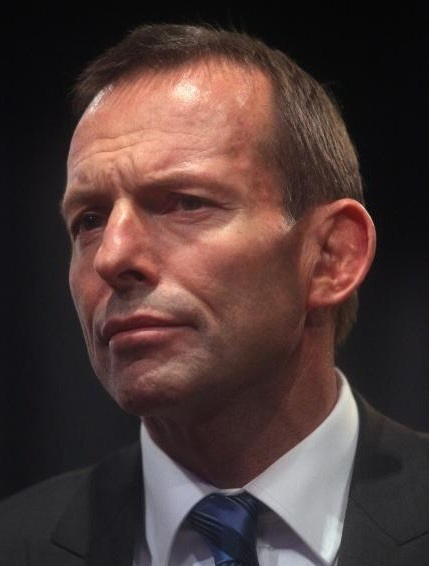
| | First party | Second party |
|---|---|---|
| Leader | Julia Gillard | Tony Abbott |
| Party | Labor | Liberal/National coalition |
| Last election | 5 seats | 0 seats |
| Seats won | 4 seats | 0 seats |
| Seat change | ▼1 | Steady |
| Popular vote | 143,796 | 109,908 |
| Percentage | 43.95% | 33.60% |
| Swing | ▲4.07 | ▼4.62 |
| TPP | 60.62% | 39.38% |
| TPP swing | ▲4.41 | ▼4.41 |
- Results by electorate

This is a list of electoral division results for the Australian 2010 federal election in the state of Tasmania.

== Overall ==
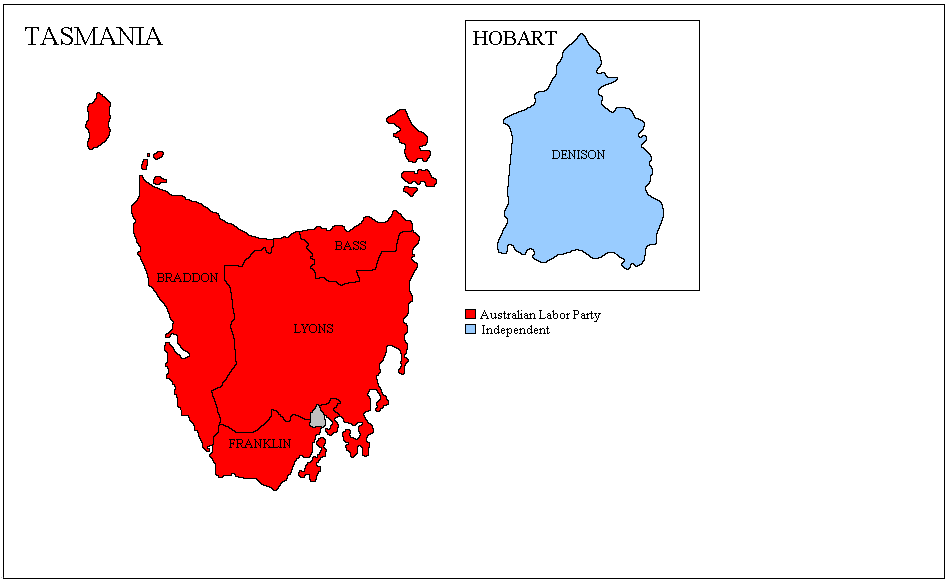
Electoral divisions: Tasmania

Turnout 95.08% (CV) — Informal 4.04%
| Party | Votes | % | Swing | Seats | Change |
|---|---|---|---|---|---|
| Australian Labor Party | 143,796 | 43.95 | +1.18 | 4 | ▼1 |
| Liberal | 109,908 | 33.60 | –4.62 | 0 | Steady |
| Australian Greens | 55,042 | 16.82 | +3.32 | | |
| Independents | 15,627 | 4.78 | +2.56 | 1 (Note: The independent was Andrew Wilkie (Denison).) | ▲1 |
| Secular Party of Australia | 1,085 | 0.33 | +0.33 | | |
| Socialist Alliance | 856 | 0.26 | +0.00 | | |
| Citizens Electoral Council | 838 | 0.26 | −0.31 | | |
| Total | 327,152 | | | 5 | |
Two-party-preferred vote
| Australian Labor Party | 198,332 | 60.62 | +4.41 | 4 | ▼1 |
| Liberal | 128,830 | 39.38 | –4.41 | 0 | Steady |
| Invalid/blank votes | | 13,791 | 4.04 | +1.12 | |
| Registered voters/turnout | | 358,609 | 95.07 | | |
Source: Commonwealth Election 2010

== Results by division ==
=== Bass ===
2010 Australian federal election: Bass
| Party | Candidate | Votes | % | ±% |
|---|---|---|---|---|
| Labor | Geoff Lyons | 28,448 | 43.43 | +6.17 |
| Liberal | Steve Titmus | 26,010 | 39.71 | −3.71 |
| Greens | Sancia Colgrave | 10,206 | 15.58 | +0.44 |
| Citizens Electoral Council | Adrian Watts | 838 | 1.28 | +0.93 |
| Total formal votes | | 65,502 | 96.02 | −0.75 |
| Informal votes | | 2,714 | 3.98 | +0.75 |
| Turnout | | 68,216 | 95.16 | −1.14 |
Two-party-preferred result
| Labor | Geoff Lyons | 37,165 | 56.74 | +5.71 |
| Liberal | Steve Titmus | 28,337 | 43.26 | −5.71 |
| Labor hold | | Swing | +5.71 | |

=== Braddon ===
2010 Australian federal election: Braddon
| Party | Candidate | Votes | % | ±% |
|---|---|---|---|---|
| Labor | Sid Sidebottom | 31,890 | 48.68 | +4.48 |
| Liberal | Garry Carpenter | 25,779 | 39.35 | −3.59 |
| Greens | Scott Jordan | 7,836 | 11.96 | +3.83 |
| Total formal votes | | 65,505 | 95.68 | −1.14 |
| Informal votes | | 2,961 | 4.32 | +1.14 |
| Turnout | | 68,466 | 95.66 | −0.62 |
Two-party-preferred result
| Labor | Sid Sidebottom | 37,650 | 57.48 | +5.16 |
| Liberal | Garry Carpenter | 27,855 | 42.52 | −5.16 |
| Labor hold | | Swing | +5.16 | |

=== Denison ===
2010 Australian federal election: Denison
| Party | Candidate | Votes | % | ±% |
|---|---|---|---|---|
| Labor | Jonathan Jackson | 23,215 | 35.79 | −12.37 |
| Liberal | Cameron Simpkins | 14,688 | 22.65 | −7.34 |
| Independent | Andrew Wilkie | 13,788 | 21.26 | +21.26 |
| Greens | Geoffrey Couser | 12,312 | 18.98 | +0.40 |
| Socialist Alliance | Mel Barnes | 856 | 1.32 | +0.56 |
| Total formal votes | | 64,859 | 96.38 | −1.12 |
| Informal votes | | 2,435 | 3.62 | +1.12 |
| Turnout | | 67,294 | 94.32 | −1.21 |
Notional two-party-preferred count
| Labor | Jonathan Jackson | 42,692 | 65.82 | +0.53 |
| Liberal | Cameron Simpkins | 22,167 | 34.18 | −0.53 |
Two-candidate-preferred result
| Independent | Andrew Wilkie | 33,217 | 51.21 | +51.21 |
| Labor | Jonathan Jackson | 31,642 | 48.79 | −16.50 |
| Independent gain from Labor | | Swing | +51.21 | |

=== Franklin ===
2010 Australian federal election: Franklin
| Party | Candidate | Votes | % | ±% |
|---|---|---|---|---|
| Labor | Julie Collins | 28,079 | 42.85 | +2.17 |
| Liberal | Jane Howlett | 21,938 | 33.48 | −7.82 |
| Greens | Wendy Heatley | 13,675 | 20.87 | +6.15 |
| Independent | John Forster | 1,839 | 2.81 | +2.81 |
| Total formal votes | | 65,531 | 96.52 | −0.83 |
| Informal votes | | 2,365 | 3.48 | +0.83 |
| Turnout | | 67,896 | 95.51 | −0.35 |
Two-party-preferred result
| Labor | Julie Collins | 39,856 | 60.82 | +6.79 |
| Liberal | Jane Howlett | 25,675 | 39.18 | −6.79 |
| Labor hold | | Swing | +6.79 | |

=== Lyons ===
2010 Australian federal election: Lyons
| Party | Candidate | Votes | % | ±% |
|---|---|---|---|---|
| Labor | Dick Adams | 32,164 | 48.91 | +5.42 |
| Liberal | Eric Hutchinson | 21,493 | 32.69 | −0.79 |
| Greens | Karen Cassidy | 11,013 | 16.75 | +5.79 |
| Secular | Lucas Noyes | 1,085 | 1.65 | +1.65 |
| Total formal votes | | 65,755 | 95.20 | −1.74 |
| Informal votes | | 3,316 | 4.80 | +1.74 |
| Turnout | | 69,071 | 94.79 | −0.05 |
Two-party-preferred result
| Labor | Dick Adams | 40,959 | 62.29 | +3.95 |
| Liberal | Eric Hutchinson | 24,796 | 37.71 | −3.95 |
| Labor hold | | Swing | +3.95 | |

== See also ==
- 2010 Australian federal election
- Results of the 2010 Australian federal election (House of Representatives)
- Post-election pendulum for the 2010 Australian federal election
- Members of the Australian House of Representatives, 2010–2013
