= Results of the 2001 Australian federal election in Tasmania =

2001 Australian federal election (Tasmania)
← 1998	10 November 2001	2004 →

All 5 Tasmanian seats in the Australian House of Representatives and 6 seats in the Australian Senate
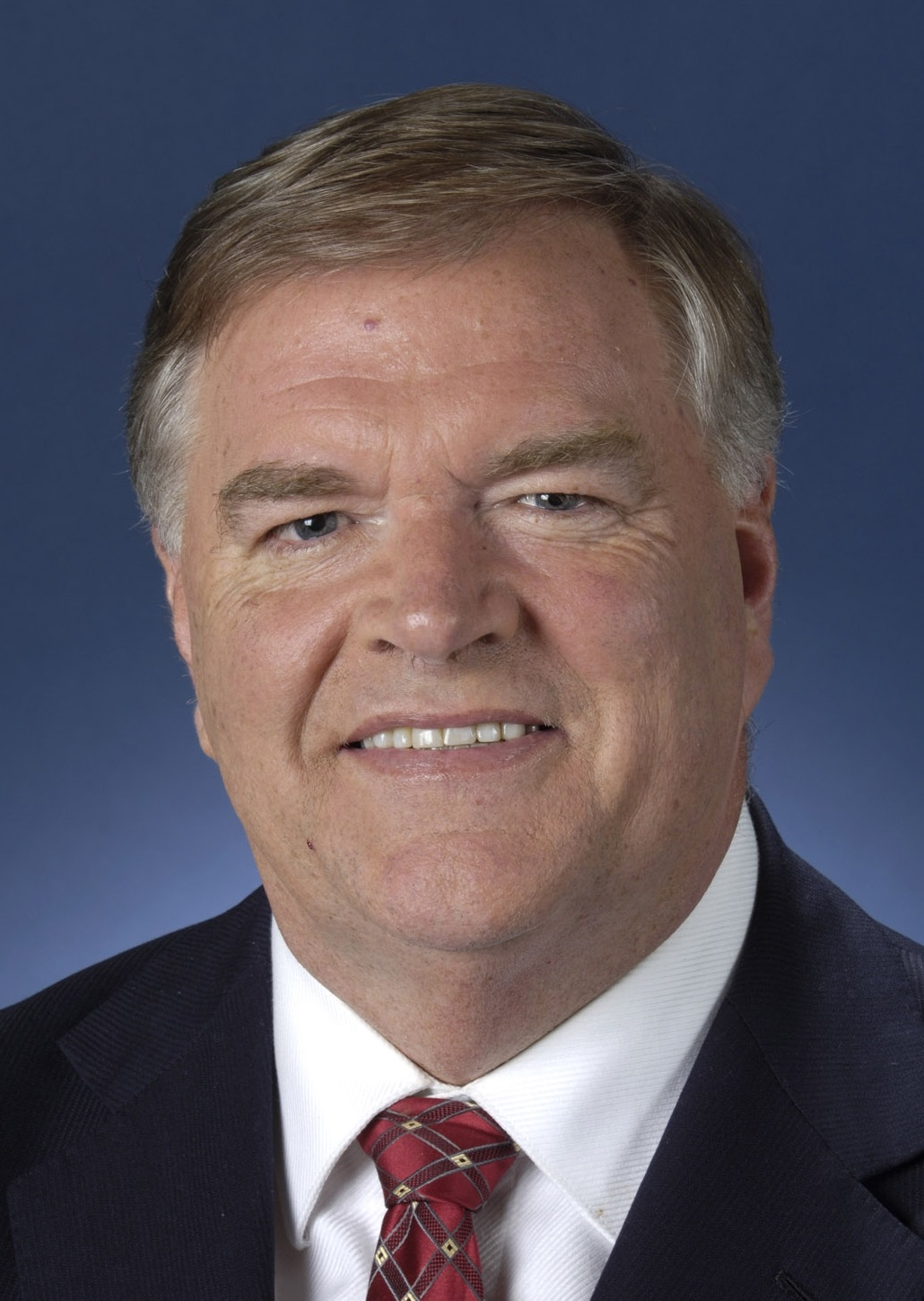

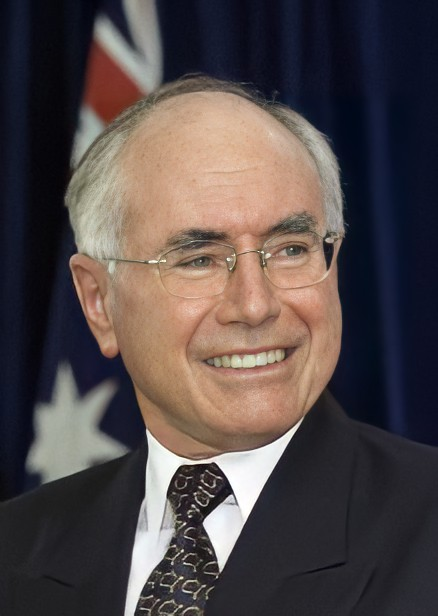
	First party	Second party
Leader	Kim Beazley	John Howard
Party	Labor	Liberal/National coalition
Last election	5 seats	0 seats
Seats won	5 seats	0 seats
Seat change	Steady	Steady
Popular vote	145,305	114,283
Percentage	47.17%	37.10%
Swing	▼1.73	▼1.07
TPP	57.32%	42.68%
TPP swing	▲0.41	▼0.41
- Results by electorate

This is a list of electoral division results for the Australian 2001 federal election in the state of Tasmania.

== Overall results ==
Turnout 99.60% (CV) — Informal 3.40%
Party	Votes	%	Swing	Seats	Change
Labor	145,305	47.17	–1.73	5	Steady
Liberal	114,283	37.10	–1.07	0	Steady
Greens	24,052	7.81	+2.25		
Democrats	13,785	4.48	+1.22		
One Nation	8,847	2.87	+0.42		
Liberals for Forests	966	1.59	+1.59		
Tasmania First	621	1.02	–0.89		
Citizens Electoral Council	159	0.26	+0.26		
Total	308,018			5	
Two-party-preferred vote
Labor		57.73	+0.41	5	Steady
Liberal		42.27	–0.41	0	Steady

== Results by division ==
=== Bass ===
2001 Australian federal election: Bass
Party	Candidate	Votes	%	±%
Labor	Michelle O'Byrne	25,987	42.82	+0.53
Liberal	Tony Benneworth	25,156	41.45	−4.29
Greens	Kim Booth	3,788	6.24	+1.99
Democrats	Sancia Colgrave	2,178	3.59	+1.15
One Nation	Denis Collins	1,836	3.03	−0.35
Liberals for Forests	Margy Dockray	966	1.59	+1.59
Tasmania First	Ian Hardman	621	1.02	−0.89
Citizens Electoral Council	Caroline Larner	159	0.26	+0.26
Total formal votes		60,691	95.73	−0.88
Informal votes		2,706	4.27	+0.88
Turnout		63,397	97.31	
Two-party-preferred result
Labor	Michelle O'Byrne	31,598	52.06	+1.87
Liberal	Tony Benneworth	29,093	47.94	−1.87
Labor hold		Swing	+1.87	

=== Braddon ===
2001 Australian federal election: Braddon
Party	Candidate	Votes	%	±%
Labor	Sid Sidebottom	30,572	48.40	+2.51
Liberal	Alan Pattison	24,743	39.17	−1.24
Greens	Clare Thompson	3,461	5.48	+0.72
One Nation	Steve Pickford	2,615	4.14	−0.03
Democrats	Craig Cooper	1,773	2.81	+0.09
Total formal votes		63,164	96.67	+0.26
Informal votes		2,178	3.33	−0.26
Turnout		65,342	97.26	
Two-party-preferred result
Labor	Sid Sidebottom	35,345	55.96	+1.68
Liberal	Alan Pattison	27,819	44.04	−1.68
Labor hold		Swing	+1.68	

=== Denison ===
2001 Australian federal election: Denison
Party	Candidate	Votes	%	±%
Labor	Duncan Kerr	32,404	51.38	−4.28
Liberal	Tony Steven	19,923	31.59	−0.53
Greens	Brenda Hampson	6,592	10.45	+2.95
Democrats	Penny Edwards	4,154	6.59	+2.66
Total formal votes		63,073	97.09	−0.38
Informal votes		1,889	2.91	+0.38
Turnout		64,962	96.56	
Two-party-preferred result
Labor	Duncan Kerr	40,530	64.26	−0.25
Liberal	Tony Steven	22,543	35.74	+0.25
Labor hold		Swing	−0.25	

=== Franklin ===
2001 Australian federal election: Franklin
Party	Candidate	Votes	%	±%
Labor	Harry Quick	28,746	45.85	−3.30
Liberal	Peter Hodgman	23,548	37.56	−1.96
Greens	Patricia Bastick	6,098	9.73	+3.27
Democrats	Karen Manskey	3,050	4.86	−0.03
One Nation	Art Mulloy	1,255	2.00	+2.00
Total formal votes		62,697	97.00	−0.21
Informal votes		1,937	3.00	+0.21
Turnout		64,634	97.01	
Two-party-preferred result
Labor	Harry Quick	36,390	58.04	+1.44
Liberal	Peter Hodgman	26,307	41.96	−1.44
Labor hold		Swing	+1.44	

=== Lyons ===
2001 Australian federal election: Lyons
Party	Candidate	Votes	%	±%
Labor	Dick Adams	27,596	47.26	−4.35
Liberal	Geoff Page	20,913	35.81	+2.87
Greens	Tim Morris	4,113	7.04	+2.27
One Nation	Neil Batchelor	3,141	5.38	+0.55
Democrats	Sonia Anderson	2,630	4.50	+2.22
Total formal votes		58,393	96.46	−0.38
Informal votes		2,146	3.54	+0.38
Turnout		60,539	96.71	
Two-party-preferred result
Labor	Dick Adams	33,970	58.17	−2.94
Liberal	Geoff Page	24,423	41.83	+2.94
Labor hold		Swing	−2.94	

== See also ==
- Results of the 2001 Australian federal election (House of Representatives)
- Members of the Australian House of Representatives, 2001–2004
