= Electoral results for the Division of Braddon =

Australian division election results

This is a list of electoral results for the Division of Braddon in Australian federal elections from the division's creation in 1955 until the present.

== Members ==
Member	Party	Term
Aubrey Luck	Liberal	1955–1958
Ron Davies	Labor	1958–1975
Ray Groom	Liberal	1975–1984
Chris Miles	Liberal	1984–1998
Sid Sidebottom	Labor	1998–2004
Mark Baker	Liberal	2004–2007
Sid Sidebottom	Labor	2007–2013
Brett Whiteley	Liberal	2013–2016
Justine Keay	Labor	2016–2019
Gavin Pearce	Liberal	2019–2025
Anne Urquhart	Labor	2025–present

== Election results ==
=== Elections in the 2020s ===
==== 2025 ====
2025 Australian federal election: Braddon
Party	Candidate	Votes	%	±%
Labor	Anne Urquhart	29,579	39.52	+17.02
Liberal	Mal Hingston	23,700	31.67	−12.44
Greens	Erin Morrow	6,318	8.44	+1.72
Independent	Adam Martin	6,174	8.25	+8.25
One Nation	Christopher Methorst	5,709	7.63	+3.29
Trumpet of Patriots	Stephen Kenney	3,360	4.49	+4.49
Total formal votes		74,840	95.47	+3.13
Informal votes		3,553	4.53	−3.13
Turnout		78,393	93.02	+0.26
Two-party-preferred result
Labor	Anne Urquhart	42,809	57.20	+15.23
Liberal	Mal Hingston	32,031	42.80	−15.23
Labor gain from Liberal		Swing	+15.23	

Results are not final. Last updated on 24 May 2025 at 1:00 AM AEST.

==== 2022 ====
2022 Australian federal election: Braddon
Party	Candidate	Votes	%	±%
Liberal	Gavin Pearce	31,142	44.11	+6.22
Labor	Chris Lynch	15,886	22.50	−9.56
Lambie	Sophie Lehmann	6,966	9.87	+9.87
Independent	Craig Garland	5,538	7.84	+7.84
Greens	Darren Briggs	4,745	6.72	+1.88
One Nation	Ludo Mineur	3,065	4.34	−1.20
United Australia	Darren Bobbermien	1,000	1.42	−2.26
Liberal Democrats	Duncan White	971	1.38	+1.38
Local	Scott Rankin	719	1.02	+1.02
Animal Justice	Keone Martin	566	0.80	+0.80
Total formal votes		70,598	92.76	−2.33
Informal votes		5,858	7.66	+0.58
Turnout		76,456	92.64	−2.45
Two-party-preferred result
Liberal	Gavin Pearce	40,968	58.03	+4.94
Labor	Chris Lynch	29,630	41.97	−4.94
Liberal hold		Swing	+4.94	

Alluvial diagram for preference flows in the seat of Braddon in the 2022 federal election. indicates at what stage the winning candidate had over 50% of the votes and was declared the winner.

=== Elections in the 2010s ===
==== 2019 ====
2019 Australian federal election: Braddon
Party	Candidate	Votes	%	±%
Liberal	Gavin Pearce	26,513	37.89	−4.14
Labor	Justine Keay	22,434	32.06	−7.51
Independent	Craig Brakey	7,619	10.89	+10.89
One Nation	Graham Gallaher	3,879	5.54	+5.54
Greens	Phill Parsons	3,384	4.84	−1.99
United Australia	Karen Spaulding	2,575	3.68	+3.68
National	Sally Milbourne	1,654	2.36	+2.36
Independent	Brett Smith	1,203	1.72	+1.72
Conservative National	Shane Allan	712	1.02	+1.02
Total formal votes		69,973	92.92	−1.96
Informal votes		5,330	7.08	+1.96
Turnout		75,303	95.09	+1.44
Two-party-preferred result
Liberal	Gavin Pearce	37,151	53.09	+4.82
Labor	Justine Keay	32,822	46.91	−4.82
Liberal gain from Labor		Swing	+4.82	

==== 2018 ====
2018 Braddon by-election
Party	Candidate	Votes	%	±%
Liberal	Brett Whiteley	24,645	39.26	−2.24
Labor	Justine Keay	23,218	36.98	−3.07
Independent	Craig Garland	6,633	10.57	+10.57
Shooters, Fishers, Farmers	Brett Neal	2,984	4.75	+4.75
Greens	Jarrod Edwards	2,518	4.01	−2.73
Independent	Donna Gibbons	1,533	2.44	+2.44
Liberal Democrats	Joshua Boag	828	1.32	−0.81
People's Party	Bruno Strangio	421	0.67	0.67
Total formal votes		62,780	94.29	−0.48
Informal votes		3,804	5.71	+0.48
Turnout		66,584	90.38	−3.71
Two-party-preferred result
Labor	Justine Keay	32,842	52.31	+0.11
Liberal	Brett Whiteley	29,938	47.69	−0.11
Labor hold		Swing	+0.11	

==== 2016 ====
2016 Australian federal election: Braddon
Party	Candidate	Votes	%	±%
Liberal	Brett Whiteley	26,841	41.50	−5.36
Labor	Justine Keay	25,898	40.05	+2.46
Greens	Scott Jordan	4,358	6.74	+1.57
Recreational Fishers	Glen Saltmarsh	3,701	5.72	+5.72
Liberal Democrats	Joshua Boag	1,380	2.13	+2.13
Renewable Energy	Clinton Rice	1,343	2.08	+2.08
Christian Democrats	Graham Hodge	1,151	1.78	+1.78
Total formal votes		64,672	94.77	−1.68
Informal votes		3,568	5.23	+1.68
Turnout		68,240	94.09	−1.26
Two-party-preferred result
Labor	Justine Keay	33,759	52.20	+4.76
Liberal	Brett Whiteley	30,913	47.80	−4.76
Labor gain from Liberal		Swing	+4.76	

==== 2013 ====
2013 Australian federal election: Braddon
Party	Candidate	Votes	%	±%
Liberal	Brett Whiteley	30,904	46.86	+7.51
Labor	Sid Sidebottom	24,791	37.59	−11.09
Palmer United	Kevin Morgan	6,125	9.29	+9.29
Greens	Melissa Houghton	3,410	5.17	−6.79
Rise Up Australia	Bernard Shaw	726	1.10	+1.10
Total formal votes		65,956	96.45	+0.77
Informal votes		2,428	3.55	−0.77
Turnout		68,384	95.41	−0.24
Two-party-preferred result
Liberal	Brett Whiteley	34,668	52.56	+10.04
Labor	Sid Sidebottom	31,288	47.44	−10.04
Liberal gain from Labor		Swing	+10.04	

==== 2010 ====
2010 Australian federal election: Braddon
Party	Candidate	Votes	%	±%
Labor	Sid Sidebottom	31,890	48.68	+4.48
Liberal	Garry Carpenter	25,779	39.35	−3.59
Greens	Scott Jordan	7,836	11.96	+3.83
Total formal votes		65,505	95.68	−1.14
Informal votes		2,961	4.32	+1.14
Turnout		68,466	95.66	−0.62
Two-party-preferred result
Labor	Sid Sidebottom	37,650	57.48	+5.16
Liberal	Garry Carpenter	27,855	42.52	−5.16
Labor hold		Swing	+5.16	

=== Elections in the 2000s ===
==== 2007 ====
2007 Australian federal election: Braddon
Party	Candidate	Votes	%	±%
Liberal	Mark Baker	29,152	44.00	−3.36
Labor	Sid Sidebottom	28,948	43.69	+0.64
Greens	Paul O'Halloran	5,392	8.14	+2.53
Family First	Wayne de Bomford	2,135	3.22	−0.76
Liberty & Democracy	Peter Cunningham	321	0.48	+0.48
Citizens Electoral Council	Stephen Dick	313	0.47	+0.47
Total formal votes		66,261	96.91	+0.52
Informal votes		2,116	3.09	−0.52
Turnout		68,377	96.28	+0.24
Two-party-preferred result
Labor	Sid Sidebottom	34,085	51.44	+2.57
Liberal	Mark Baker	32,176	48.56	−2.57
Labor gain from Liberal		Swing	+2.57	

==== 2004 ====
2004 Australian federal election: Braddon
Party	Candidate	Votes	%	±%
Liberal	Mark Baker	30,681	47.36	+8.19
Labor	Sid Sidebottom	27,893	43.05	−5.35
Greens	Michelle Foale	3,632	5.61	+0.13
Family First	Wayne de Bomford	2,581	3.98	+3.98
Total formal votes		64,787	96.39	−0.28
Informal votes		2,426	3.61	+0.28
Turnout		67,213	96.04	−0.41
Two-party-preferred result
Liberal	Mark Baker	33,127	51.13	+7.09
Labor	Sid Sidebottom	31,660	48.87	−7.09
Liberal gain from Labor		Swing	+7.09	

==== 2001 ====
2001 Australian federal election: Braddon
Party	Candidate	Votes	%	±%
Labor	Sid Sidebottom	30,572	48.40	+2.51
Liberal	Alan Pattison	24,743	39.17	−1.24
Greens	Clare Thompson	3,461	5.48	+0.72
One Nation	Steve Pickford	2,615	4.14	−0.03
Democrats	Craig Cooper	1,773	2.81	+0.09
Total formal votes		63,164	96.67	+0.26
Informal votes		2,178	3.33	−0.26
Turnout		65,342	97.26	
Two-party-preferred result
Labor	Sid Sidebottom	35,345	55.96	+1.68
Liberal	Alan Pattison	27,819	44.04	−1.68
Labor hold		Swing	+1.68	

=== Elections in the 1990s ===
==== 1998 ====
1998 Australian federal election: Braddon
Party	Candidate	Votes	%	±%
Labor	Sid Sidebottom	26,643	45.85	+7.54
Liberal	Chris Miles	23,480	40.41	−11.73
Greens	Clare Thompson	2,794	4.81	−0.83
One Nation	John Thomson	2,446	4.21	+4.21
Democrats	Peter Morgan	1,601	2.76	−1.15
Tasmania First	Gavin Thompson	1,143	1.97	+1.97
Total formal votes		58,107	96.43	−0.99
Informal votes		2,153	3.57	+0.99
Turnout		60,260	96.54	−0.27
Two-party-preferred result
Labor	Sid Sidebottom	31,567	54.33	+10.02
Liberal	Chris Miles	26,540	45.67	−10.02
Labor gain from Liberal		Swing	+10.02	

==== 1996 ====
1996 Australian federal election: Braddon
Party	Candidate	Votes	%	±%
Liberal	Chris Miles	31,201	52.14	+2.76
Labor	Sid Sidebottom	22,928	38.31	−3.62
Greens	Clare Thompson	3,375	5.64	+1.63
Democrats	Chris Ivory	2,337	3.91	+1.13
Total formal votes		59,841	97.42	+0.16
Informal votes		1,586	2.58	−0.16
Turnout		61,427	96.81	+0.19
Two-party-preferred result
Liberal	Chris Miles	33,279	55.70	+2.85
Labor	Sid Sidebottom	26,473	44.30	−2.85
Liberal hold		Swing	+2.85	

==== 1993 ====
1993 Australian federal election: Braddon
Party	Candidate	Votes	%	±%
Liberal	Chris Miles	29,863	49.38	−5.91
Labor	Mike Gard	25,365	41.94	+6.40
Greens	John Coombes	2,426	4.01	+4.01
Democrats	Jim Reilly	1,676	2.77	−3.89
Independent	Royce Lohrey	1,151	1.90	+1.90
Total formal votes		60,481	97.26	+0.77
Informal votes		1,705	2.74	−0.77
Turnout		62,186	96.63	
Two-party-preferred result
Liberal	Chris Miles	31,952	52.85	−5.41
Labor	Mike Gard	28,509	47.15	+5.41
Liberal hold		Swing	−5.41	

==== 1990 ====
1990 Australian federal election: Braddon
Party	Candidate	Votes	%	±%
Liberal	Chris Miles	31,860	55.5	−2.4
Labor	Terry Hynes	20,325	35.4	−6.7
Democrats	James Reilly	3,808	6.6	+6.6
Independent	Tom Egglestone	1,458	2.5	+2.5
Total formal votes		57,451	96.5	
Informal votes		2,079	3.5	
Turnout		59,530	96.9	
Two-party-preferred result
Liberal	Chris Miles	33,553	58.4	+0.5
Labor	Terry Hynes	23,879	41.6	−0.5
Liberal hold		Swing	+0.5	

=== Elections in the 1980s ===
==== 1987 ====
1987 Australian federal election: Braddon
Party	Candidate	Votes	%	±%
Liberal	Chris Miles	32,108	57.9	+5.2
Labor	David Currie	23,307	42.1	−1.3
Total formal votes		55,415	96.2	
Informal votes		2,173	3.8	
Turnout		57,588	96.3	
Liberal hold		Swing	+3.3	

==== 1984 ====
1984 Australian federal election: Braddon
Party	Candidate	Votes	%	±%
Liberal	Chris Miles	27,296	52.7	−8.0
Labor	Greg Peart	22,500	43.4	+7.5
Democrats	Gavin Bugg	2,047	3.9	+0.5
Total formal votes		51,843	94.1	
Informal votes		3,248	5.9	
Turnout		55,091	95.4	
Two-party-preferred result
Liberal	Chris Miles	28,297	54.6	−7.5
Labor	Greg Peart	23,541	45.4	+7.5
Liberal hold		Swing	−7.5	

==== 1983 ====
1983 Australian federal election: Braddon
Party	Candidate	Votes	%	±%
Liberal	Ray Groom	31,143	61.2	+6.1
Labor	Lance Fee	18,016	35.4	−9.5
Democrats	Greg Sargent	1,731	3.4	+3.4
Total formal votes		50,890	97.9	
Informal votes		1,110	2.1	
Turnout		52,000	95.9	
Two-party-preferred result
Liberal	Ray Groom		62.6	+7.5
Labor	Lance Fee		37.4	−7.5
Liberal hold		Swing	+7.5	

==== 1980 ====
1980 Australian federal election: Braddon
Party	Candidate	Votes	%	±%
Liberal	Ray Groom	27,307	55.1	−3.1
Labor	Lance Fee	22,275	44.9	+3.1
Total formal votes		49,582	97.1	
Informal votes		1,496	2.9	
Turnout		51,078	94.8	
Liberal hold		Swing	−3.1	

=== Elections in the 1970s ===
==== 1977 ====
1977 Australian federal election: Braddon
Party	Candidate	Votes	%	±%
Liberal	Ray Groom	27,384	58.2	+5.3
Labor	Duncan Kerr	19,656	41.8	−3.6
Total formal votes		47,040	96.8	
Informal votes		1,535	3.2	
Turnout		48,575	96.3	
Liberal hold		Swing	+4.4	

==== 1975 ====
1975 Australian federal election: Braddon
Party	Candidate	Votes	%	±%
Liberal	Ray Groom	27,131	52.9	+8.6
Labor	Ron Davies	23,270	45.4	−7.9
Workers	Lance Buckingham	552	1.1	+1.1
National Country	Barry Whiley	328	0.6	+0.6
Total formal votes		51,281	98.4	
Informal votes		846	1.6	
Turnout		52,127	96.6	
Two-party-preferred result
Liberal	Ray Groom		53.8	+8.6
Labor	Ron Davies		46.2	−8.6
Liberal gain from Labor		Swing	+8.6	

==== 1974 ====
1974 Australian federal election: Braddon
Party	Candidate	Votes	%	±%
Labor	Ron Davies	26,075	53.3	−8.9
Liberal	Ray Groom	21,678	44.3	+9.9
Independent	John Chapman-Mortimer	767	1.6	+1.6
Australia	Walter Roach	423	0.9	+0.9
Total formal votes		48,943	98.2	
Informal votes		888	1.8	
Turnout		49,831	96.6	
Two-party-preferred result
Labor	Ron Davies		54.8	−8.1
Liberal	Ray Groom		45.2	+8.1
Labor hold		Swing	−8.1	

==== 1972 ====
1972 Australian federal election: Braddon
Party	Candidate	Votes	%	±%
Labor	Ron Davies	27,502	62.2	−0.5
Liberal	William Luck	15,210	34.4	+1.8
Democratic Labor	Dudley McNamara	1,506	3.4	−1.3
Total formal votes		44,218	98.5	
Informal votes		676	1.5	
Turnout		44,894	96.6	
Two-party-preferred result
Labor	Ron Davies		62.9	−0.7
Liberal	William Luck		37.1	+0.7
Labor hold		Swing	−0.7	

=== Elections in the 1960s ===
==== 1969 ====
1969 Australian federal election: Braddon
Party	Candidate	Votes	%	±%
Labor	Ron Davies	26,224	62.7	+7.9
Liberal	Peter Rothwell	13,637	32.6	−7.4
Democratic Labor	Dudley McNamara	1,955	4.7	−0.4
Total formal votes		41,816	98.7	
Informal votes		562	1.3	
Turnout		42,378	96.5	
Two-party-preferred result
Labor	Ron Davies		63.6	+7.2
Liberal	Peter Rothwell		36.4	−7.2
Labor hold		Swing	+7.2	

==== 1966 ====
1966 Australian federal election: Braddon
Party	Candidate	Votes	%	±%
Labor	Ron Davies	21,040	55.9	−1.7
Liberal	Paul Fenton	14,637	38.9	+1.6
Democratic Labor	John Chapman-Mortimer	1,934	5.1	+0.0
Total formal votes		37,611	98.8	
Informal votes		461	1.2	
Turnout		38,072	95.8	
Two-party-preferred result
Labor	Ron Davies		57.7	−0.9
Liberal	Paul Fenton		42.3	+0.9
Labor hold		Swing	−0.9	

==== 1963 ====
1963 Australian federal election: Braddon
Party	Candidate	Votes	%	±%
Labor	Ron Davies	20,843	57.6	−3.3
Liberal	Paul Fenton	13,488	37.3	+4.3
Democratic Labor	Frances Lane	1,853	5.1	−0.9
Total formal votes		36,184	99.0	
Informal votes		351	1.0	
Turnout		36,535	96.4	
Two-party-preferred result
Labor	Ron Davies		58.6	−3.5
Liberal	Paul Fenton		41.4	+3.5
Labor hold		Swing	−3.5	

==== 1961 ====
1961 Australian federal election: Braddon
Party	Candidate	Votes	%	±%
Labor	Ron Davies	21,093	60.9	+14.1
Liberal	William Young	11,433	33.0	−11.6
Democratic Labor	Frances Lane	2,094	6.0	−2.6
Total formal votes		34,620	97.4	
Informal votes		911	2.6	
Turnout		35,531	96.5	
Two-party-preferred result
Labor	Ron Davies		62.1	+11.7
Liberal	William Young		37.9	−11.7
Labor hold		Swing	+11.7	

=== Elections in the 1950s ===
==== 1958 ====
1958 Australian federal election: Braddon
Party	Candidate	Votes	%	±%
Labor	Ron Davies	15,243	46.8	+5.7
Liberal	Aubrey Luck	14,525	44.6	−14.3
Democratic Labor	Frances Lane	2,786	8.6	+8.6
Total formal votes		32,554	96.1	
Informal votes		1,334	3.9	
Turnout		33,888	96.0	
Two-party-preferred result
Labor	Ron Davies	16,420	50.4	+9.3
Liberal	Aubrey Luck	16,134	49.6	−9.3
Labor gain from Liberal		Swing	+9.3	

==== 1955 ====
1955 Australian federal election: Braddon
Party	Candidate	Votes	%	±%
Liberal	Aubrey Luck	18,590	58.9	+8.4
Labor	Reg Murray	12,990	41.1	−8.4
Total formal votes		31,580	96.1	
Informal votes		1,279	3.9	
Turnout		32,859	96.1	
Liberal notional hold		Swing	+8.4	
