= Results of the 1996 Australian federal election in Tasmania =

1996 Australian federal election (Tasmania)
- 2 March 1996

All 5 Tasmanian seats in the Australian House of Representatives and 6 seats in the Australian Senate

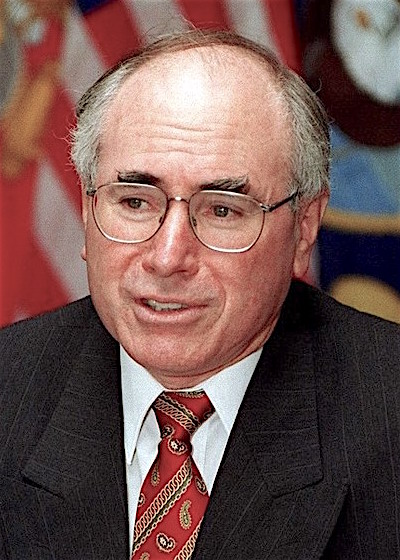
	First party	Second party
Leader	Paul Keating	John Howard
Party	Labor	Liberal/National coalition
Last election	4 seats	1 seat
Seats won	3 seats	2 seats
Seat change	▼1	▲1
Popular vote	137,607	139,305
Percentage	44.3%	44.9%
Swing	▼2.5	▲2.8
TPP	51.58%	48.72%
TPP swing	▼3.07	▲3.07

This is a list of electoral division results for the Australian 1996 federal election in the state of Tasmania.

== Overall results ==
Turnout 96.6% (CV) — Informal 2.3%
Party	Votes	%	Swing	Seats	Change
Liberal	138,087	44.46	+2.42	2	▲1
National	1,218	0.39	+0.39		
Liberal/National Coalition	139,305	44.85	+2.81	2	▲1
Labor	137,607	44.31	−2.45	3	▼1
Greens	19,689	6.34	−1.58		
Democrats	12,696	4.09	+1.60		
Independent	1,274	0.41	−0.09		
Total	310,571			5	
Two-party-preferred vote
Labor	159,853	51.58	−3.07	3	▼1
Liberal/National Coalition	150,057	48.42	+3.07	2	▲1
Invalid/blank votes	7,472	2.35	−0.38		
Turnout	318,043	96.58			
Registered voters	329,304				
Source: Federal Elections 1996

== Results by division ==
=== Bass ===
1996 Australian federal election: Bass
Party	Candidate	Votes	%	±%
Liberal	Warwick Smith	31,875	51.23	+3.91
Labor	Silvia Smith	25,034	40.24	−3.56
Greens	Kristina Nicklason	3,093	4.97	−1.36
Democrats	Debbie Butler	2,214	3.56	+1.01
Total formal votes		62,216	97.31	+0.75
Informal votes		1,328	2.09	−0.75
Turnout		63,544	96.25	+0.24
Two-party-preferred result
Liberal	Warwick Smith	33,861	54.57	+4.60
Labor	Silvia Smith	28,190	45.43	−4.60
Liberal gain from Labor		Swing	+4.60	

=== Braddon ===
1996 Australian federal election: Braddon
Party	Candidate	Votes	%	±%
Liberal	Chris Miles	31,201	52.14	+2.76
Labor	Sid Sidebottom	22,928	38.31	−3.62
Greens	Clare Thompson	3,375	5.64	+1.63
Democrats	Chris Ivory	2,337	3.91	+1.13
Total formal votes		59,841	97.42	+0.16
Informal votes		1,586	2.58	−0.16
Turnout		61,427	96.81	+0.19
Two-party-preferred result
Liberal	Chris Miles	33,279	55.70	+2.85
Labor	Sid Sidebottom	26,473	44.30	−2.85
Liberal hold		Swing	+2.85	

=== Denison ===
1996 Australian federal election: Denison
Party	Candidate	Votes	%	±%
Labor	Duncan Kerr	33,023	52.27	+1.01
Liberal	Ingrid Wren	21,667	34.30	+2.94
Greens	Karen Weldrick	5,229	8.28	−5.94
Democrats	Rachel Dudgeon	2,769	4.38	+3.20
	Sarah Stephen	486	0.77	+0.77
Total formal votes		63,174	97.86	+0.47
Informal votes		1,384	2.14	−0.47
Turnout		64,558	96.22	+0.47
Two-party-preferred result
Labor	Duncan Kerr	38,941	61.79	−2.65
Liberal	Ingrid Wren	24,078	38.21	+2.65
Labor hold		Swing	−2.65	

=== Franklin ===
1996 Australian federal election: Franklin
Party	Candidate	Votes	%	±%
Labor	Harry Quick	28,259	45.95	−3.25
Liberal	Les Glover	25,068	40.76	+2.01
Greens	John Hale	4,286	6.97	−1.24
Democrats	Irene Fisher	3,094	5.03	+1.19
Independent	Kim Peart	788	1.28	+1.28
Total formal votes		61,495	97.74	+0.33
Informal votes		1,420	2.26	−0.33
Turnout		62,915	96.84	+0.24
Two-party-preferred result
Labor	Harry Quick	33,567	54.68	−2.76
Liberal	Les Glover	27,824	45.32	+2.76
Labor hold		Swing	−2.76	

=== Lyons ===
1996 Australian federal election: Lyons
Party	Candidate	Votes	%	±%
Labor	Dick Adams	28,363	44.42	−3.01
Liberal	Russell Anderson	28,276	44.29	+0.45
Greens	Debra Manskey	3,706	5.80	−0.71
Democrats	Duncan Mills	2,282	3.57	+1.36
National	Leigh de la Motte	1,218	1.91	+1.91
Total formal votes		63,845	97.33	+0.21
Informal votes		1,754	2.67	−0.21
Turnout		65,599	96.79	+0.26
Two-party-preferred result
Labor	Dick Adams	32,682	51.31	−2.47
Liberal	Russell Anderson	31,015	48.69	+2.47
Labor hold		Swing	−2.47	

== See also ==
- Results of the 1996 Australian federal election (House of Representatives)
- Members of the Australian House of Representatives, 1996–1998
