= Results of the 2007 Australian federal election in Tasmania =

2007 Australian federal election (Tasmania)
← 2004	24 November 2007	2010 →

All 5 Tasmanian seats in the Australian House of Representatives and 6 seats in the Australian Senate
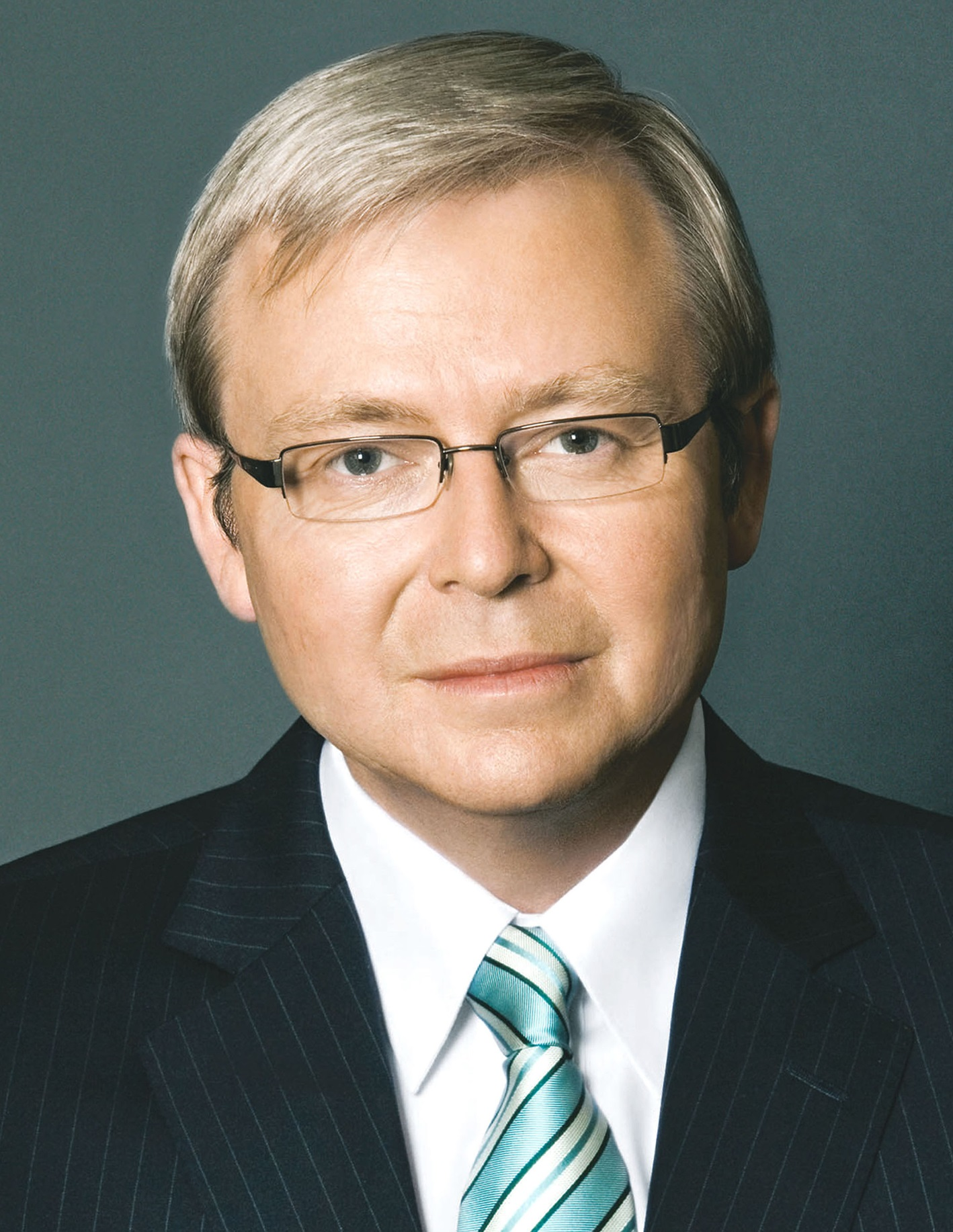

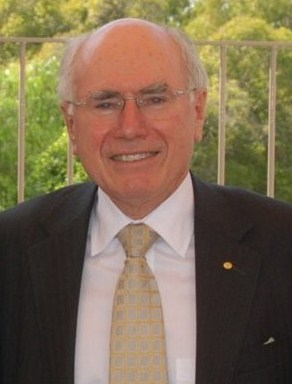
	First party	Second party
Leader	Kevin Rudd	John Howard
Party	Labor	Liberal/National coalition
Last election	3 seats	2 seats
Seats won	5 seats	0 seats
Seat change	▲2	▼2
Popular vote	139,077	124,280
Percentage	42.77%	38.22%
Swing	▼1.81	▼3.76
TPP	56.21%	43.79%
TPP swing	▲2.02	▼2.02
- Results by electorate

This is a list of electoral division results for the Australian 2007 federal election in the state of Tasmania.

== Overall results ==
Turnout 95.76% (CV) — Informal 2.92%
Party	Votes	%	Swing	Seats	Change
Labor	139,077	42.77	–1.81	5	▲2
Liberal	124,280	38.22	–3.76	0	▼2
Greens	43,893	13.50	+3.62		
Family First	7,356	2.26	–0.58		
Citizens Electoral Council	1,856	0.57	+0.20		
Socialist Alliance	859	0.26	–0.09		
Liberty and Democracy Party	606	0.19	+0.19		
Independents	7,215	2.22	+2.22		
Total	325,142			5	
Two-party-preferred vote
Labor	182,757	56.21	+2.02	5	▲2
Liberal	142,385	43.79	–2.02	0	▼2
Invalid/blank votes		9,796	2.92	−0.67	
Registered voters/turnout		349,753	95.76		
Source: Commonwealth Election 2007

Liberal to Labor: Bass, Braddon.

== Results by division ==
=== Bass ===
2007 Australian federal election: Bass
Party	Candidate	Votes	%	±%
Liberal	Michael Ferguson	27,769	43.50	−5.63
Labor	Jodie Campbell	23,764	37.23	−1.99
Greens	Tom Millen	9,745	15.27	+7.17
Independent	Sven Wiener	1,123	1.76	+1.76
Family First	Ixa de Haan	930	1.46	−0.37
Liberty & Democracy	Shem Bennett	285	0.45	+0.45
Citizens Electoral Council	Adrian Watts	219	0.34	−1.02
Total formal votes		63,835	96.75	+0.65
Informal votes		2,142	3.25	−0.65
Turnout		65.977	95.66	+0.03
Two-party-preferred result
Labor	Jodie Campbell	32,553	51.00	+3.63
Liberal	Michael Ferguson	31,282	49.00	−3.63
Labor gain from Liberal		Swing	+3.63	

=== Braddon ===
2007 Australian federal election: Braddon
Party	Candidate	Votes	%	±%
Liberal	Mark Baker	29,152	44.00	−3.36
Labor	Sid Sidebottom	28,948	43.69	+0.64
Greens	Paul O'Halloran	5,392	8.14	+2.53
Family First	Wayne de Bomford	2,135	3.22	−0.76
Liberty & Democracy	Peter Cunningham	321	0.48	+0.48
Citizens Electoral Council	Stephen Dick	313	0.47	+0.47
Total formal votes		66,261	96.91	+0.52
Informal votes		2,116	3.09	−0.52
Turnout		68,377	96.28	+0.24
Two-party-preferred result
Labor	Sid Sidebottom	34,085	51.44	+2.57
Liberal	Mark Baker	32,176	48.56	−2.57
Labor gain from Liberal		Swing	+2.57	

=== Denison ===
2007 Australian federal election: Denison
Party	Candidate	Votes	%	±%
Labor	Duncan Kerr	31,001	48.46	−1.05
Liberal	Leigh Gray	18,974	29.66	−2.90
Greens	Helen Hutchinson	11,898	18.60	+4.00
Family First	Robyn Munro	1,360	2.13	−0.34
Socialist Alliance	Susan Austin	494	0.77	−0.08
Citizens Electoral Council	Rob Larner	243	0.38	+0.38
Total formal votes		63,970	97.50	+0.61
Informal votes		1,640	2.50	−0.61
Turnout		65,610	95.25	−0.02
Two-party-preferred result
Labor	Duncan Kerr	41,982	65.63	+2.34
Liberal	Leigh Gray	21,988	34.37	−2.34
Labor hold		Swing	+2.34	

=== Franklin ===
2007 Australian federal election: Franklin
Party	Candidate	Votes	%	±%
Labor	Julie Collins	27,990	41.39	−5.03
Liberal	Vanessa Goodwin	27,742	41.02	+2.35
Greens	Gerard Velnaar	9,769	14.44	+3.26
Family First	Gino Papiccio	1,504	2.22	−0.98
Socialist Alliance	Matt Holloway	365	0.53	+0.01
Citizens Electoral Council	Roger Honey	262	0.39	+0.39
Total formal votes		67,632	97.28	+0.68
Informal votes		1,893	2.72	−0.68
Turnout		69,525	95.84	+0.19
Two-party-preferred result
Labor	Julie Collins	36,845	54.48	−3.11
Liberal	Vanessa Goodwin	30,787	45.52	+3.11
Labor hold		Swing	−3.11	

=== Lyons ===
2007 Australian federal election: Lyons
Party	Candidate	Votes	%	±%
Labor	Dick Adams	27,374	43.15	−1.41
Liberal	Geoff Page	20,643	32.54	−9.79
Greens	Karen Cassidy	7,089	11.17	+1.22
Independent	Ben Quin	6,092	9.60	+9.60
Family First	Amy Parsons	1,427	2.25	−0.40
Citizens Electoral Council	Ray Williams	819	1.29	+0.78
Total formal votes		63,444	96.94	+0.89
Informal votes		2,005	3.06	−0.89
Turnout		65,449	95.72	+0.06
Two-party-preferred result
Labor	Dick Adams	37,292	58.78	+5.10
Liberal	Geoff Page	26,152	41.22	−5.10
Labor hold		Swing	+5.10	

== See also ==
- Results of the 2007 Australian federal election (House of Representatives)
- Post-election pendulum for the 2007 Australian federal election
- Members of the Australian House of Representatives, 2007–2010
