= Results of the 2004 Australian federal election in Tasmania =

2004 Australian federal election (Tasmania)
← 2001	9 October 2004	2007 →

All 5 Tasmanian seats in the Australian House of Representatives and 6 seats in the Australian Senate
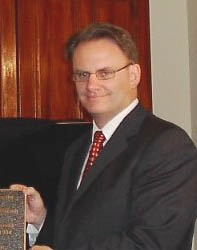

	First party	Second party
Leader	Mark Latham	John Howard
Party	Labor	Liberal/National coalition
Last election	5 seats	0 seats
Seats won	3 seats	2 seats
Seat change	▼2	▲2
Popular vote	140,918	132,724
Percentage	44.58%	41.98%
Swing	▼2.59	▲4.88
TPP	54.19%	45.81%
TPP swing	▼3.54	▲3.54
- Results by electorate

This is a list of electoral division results for the Australian 2004 federal election in the state of Tasmania.

== Overall results ==
Turnout 95.64% (CV) — Informal 3.59%
Party	Votes	%	Swing	Seats	Change
Labor	140,918	44.58	–2.59	3	▼2
Liberal	132,724	41.98	+4.88	2	▲2
Greens	31,242	9.88	+2.07		
Family First	8,973	2.84	+2.84		
Citizens Electoral Council	1,158	0.37	+0.32		
Socialist Alliance	1,108	0.35	+0.35		
Total	316,123			5	
Two-party-preferred vote
Labor	171,294	54.19	–3.54	3	▼2
Liberal/National Coalition	144,829	45.81	+3.54	2	▲2

Labor to Liberal: Bass Braddon

Tasmania bucked the national trend against Labor. The party still lost two seats but maintained a primary vote of 44.6%. The Liberal party saw its primary vote jump 5.9% to 42.0%, and the Greens saw their strongest nationwide results capturing 9.9% of the vote.

== Results by division ==
=== Bass ===
2004 Australian federal election: Bass
Party	Candidate	Votes	%	±%
Liberal	Michael Ferguson	30,678	49.13	+7.68
Labor	Michelle O'Byrne	24,491	39.22	−3.60
Greens	Jeremy Ball	5,059	8.10	+1.86
Family First	Christine Bergman	1,145	1.83	+1.83
Citizens Electoral Council	Caroline Larner	847	1.36	+1.10
Socialist Alliance	Meredith de Landelles	219	0.35	+0.35
Total formal votes		62,439	96.10	+0.37
Informal votes		2,534	3.90	−0.37
Turnout		64,973	95.63	−0.53
Two-party-preferred result
Liberal	Michael Ferguson	32,860	52.63	+4.69
Labor	Michelle O'Byrne	29,579	47.37	−4.69
Liberal gain from Labor		Swing	+4.69	

=== Braddon ===
2004 Australian federal election: Braddon
Party	Candidate	Votes	%	±%
Liberal	Mark Baker	30,681	47.36	+8.19
Labor	Sid Sidebottom	27,893	43.05	−5.35
Greens	Michelle Foale	3,632	5.61	+0.13
Family First	Wayne de Bomford	2,581	3.98	+3.98
Total formal votes		64,787	96.39	−0.28
Informal votes		2,426	3.61	+0.28
Turnout		67,213	96.04	−0.41
Two-party-preferred result
Liberal	Mark Baker	33,127	51.13	+7.09
Labor	Sid Sidebottom	31,660	48.87	−7.09
Liberal gain from Labor		Swing	+7.09	

=== Denison ===
2004 Australian federal election: Denison
Party	Candidate	Votes	%	±%
Labor	Duncan Kerr	31,602	49.51	−1.87
Liberal	Erick Pastoor	20,782	32.56	+0.97
Greens	Helen Burnet	9,318	14.60	+4.15
Family First	Gino Papiccio	1,578	2.47	+2.47
Socialist Alliance	Kamala Emanuel	544	0.85	+0.85
Total formal votes		63,824	96.90	−0.19
Informal votes		2,045	3.10	+0.19
Turnout		65,869	95.26	−0.36
Two-party-preferred result
Labor	Duncan Kerr	40,397	63.29	−0.97
Liberal	Erick Pastoor	23,427	36.71	+0.97
Labor hold		Swing	−0.97	

=== Franklin ===
2004 Australian federal election: Franklin
Party	Candidate	Votes	%	±%
Labor	Harry Quick	29,938	46.42	+0.57
Liberal	Henry Finnis	24,936	38.67	+1.11
Greens	Mathew Woolley	7,207	11.18	+1.45
Family First	Marc Mumford	2,063	3.20	+3.20
Socialist Alliance	Glenn Shields	345	0.53	+0.53
Total formal votes		64,489	96.60	−0.40
Informal votes		2,270	3.40	+0.40
Turnout		86,759	95.65	−0.65
Two-party-preferred result
Labor	Harry Quick	37,139	57.59	−0.45
Liberal	Henry Finnis	27,350	42.41	+0.45
Labor hold		Swing	−0.45	

=== Lyons ===
2004 Australian federal election: Lyons
Party	Candidate	Votes	%	±%
Labor	Dick Adams	26,994	44.56	−2.70
Liberal	Ben Quin	25,647	42.33	+6.52
Greens	Glenn Millar	6,036	9.95	+2.91
Family First	Marie Papiccio	1,606	2.65	+2.65
Citizens Electoral Council	Saul Jenkins	311	0.51	+0.51
Total formal votes		60,584	96.05	−0.41
Informal votes		2,494	3.95	+0.41
Turnout		63,078	95.66	−0.52
Two-party-preferred result
Labor	Dick Adams	32,519	53.68	−4.49
Liberal	Ben Quin	28,065	46.32	+4.49
Labor hold		Swing	−4.49	

== See also ==
- Results of the 2004 Australian federal election (House of Representatives)
- Members of the Australian House of Representatives, 2004–2007
