= Results of the 1998 Australian federal election in Tasmania =

1998 Australian federal election (Tasmania)
- 3 October 1998

All 5 Tasmanian seats in the Australian House of Representatives and 6 seats in the Australian Senate
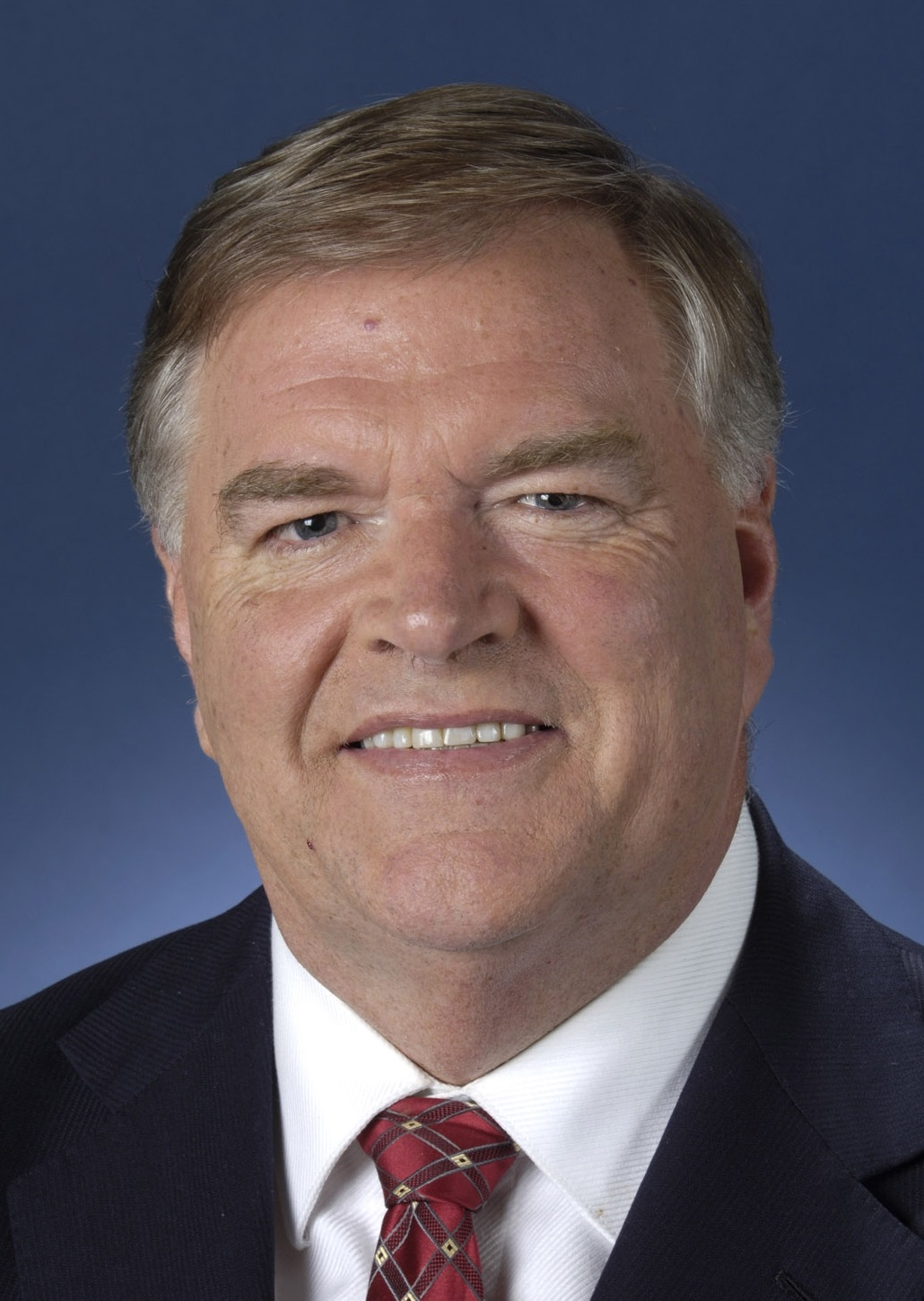

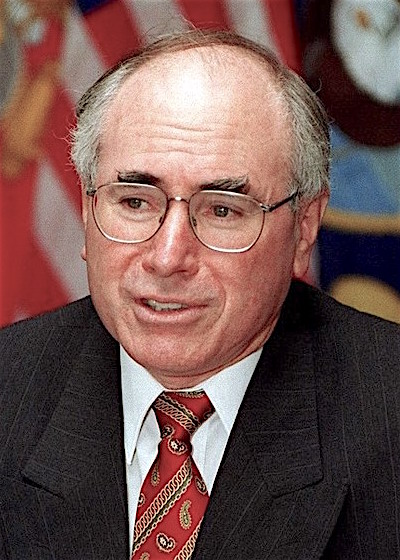
	First party	Second party
Leader	Kim Beazley	John Howard
Party	Labor	Coalition
Last election	3 seats	2 seats
Seats won	5 seats	0 seats
Seat change	▲2	▼2
Popular vote	150,384	117,377
Percentage	48.9%	38.2%
Swing	▲4.6	▼6.3
TPP	57.32%	42.68%
TPP swing	▲5.74	▼5.74

This is a list of electoral division results for the Australian 1998 federal election in the state of Tasmania.

== Overall results ==
Turnout 95.6% (CV) — Informal 3.5%
Party	Votes	%	Swing	Seats	Change
Labor	150,384	48.91	4.60	5	▲2
Liberal	117,377	38.17	-6.29		▼2
Greens	17,091	5.56	-0.78		
Democrats	10,024	3.26	-0.83		
One Nation	7,553	2.46	0.00		
Tasmania First	4,551	1.48	0.00		
Total	307,477			5	
Two-party-preferred vote
Labor	176,241	57.32	5.74	5	▲2
Liberal	131,236	42.68	-5.74	0	▼2
Invalid/blank votes	9,819	3.09	0.74		
Turnout	317,296	96.12			
Registered voters	330,121				
Source: Federal Elections 1998

== Results by division ==
=== Bass ===
1998 Australian federal election: Bass
Party	Candidate	Votes	%	±%
Liberal	Warwick Smith	27,974	45.75	−5.48
Labor	Michelle O'Byrne	25,864	42.30	+2.06
Greens	Stuart Baird	2,595	4.24	−0.73
One Nation	Allan Lockhart	2,057	3.36	+3.36
Democrats	Brian Muir	1,491	2.44	−1.12
Tasmania First	Harvey Smith	1,165	1.91	+1.91
Total formal votes		61,146	96.61	−1.30
Informal votes		2,148	3.39	+1.30
Turnout		63,294	96.00	−0.26
Two-party-preferred result
Labor	Michelle O'Byrne	30,612	50.06	+4.63
Liberal	Warwick Smith	30,534	49.94	−4.63
Labor gain from Liberal		Swing	+4.63	

=== Braddon ===
1998 Australian federal election: Braddon
Party	Candidate	Votes	%	±%
Labor	Sid Sidebottom	26,643	45.85	+7.54
Liberal	Chris Miles	23,480	40.41	−11.73
Greens	Clare Thompson	2,794	4.81	−0.83
One Nation	John Thomson	2,446	4.21	+4.21
Democrats	Peter Morgan	1,601	2.76	−1.15
Tasmania First	Gavin Thompson	1,143	1.97	+1.97
Total formal votes		58,107	96.43	−0.99
Informal votes		2,153	3.57	+0.99
Turnout		60,260	96.54	−0.27
Two-party-preferred result
Labor	Sid Sidebottom	31,567	54.33	+10.02
Liberal	Chris Miles	26,540	45.67	−10.02
Labor gain from Liberal		Swing	+10.02	

=== Denison ===
1998 Australian federal election: Denison
Party	Candidate	Votes	%	±%
Labor	Duncan Kerr	34,854	55.66	+3.38
Liberal	Andrew Gregson	20,114	32.12	−2.18
Greens	Mat Hines	4,698	7.50	−0.78
Democrats	Brent Blackburn	2,460	3.93	−0.45
Natural Law	Gregory Broszczyk	497	0.79	+0.79
Total formal votes		62,623	97.47	−0.38
Informal votes		1,624	2.53	+0.38
Turnout		64,247	95.38	−0.84
Two-party-preferred result
Labor	Duncan Kerr	40,399	64.51	+2.72
Liberal	Andrew Gregson	22,224	35.49	−2.72
Labor hold		Swing	+2.72	

=== Franklin ===
1998 Australian federal election: Franklin
Party	Candidate	Votes	%	±%
Labor	Harry Quick	30,180	49.14	+3.19
Liberal	Jane Goodluck	24,266	39.51	−1.25
Greens	Kay McFarlane	3,962	6.45	−0.52
Democrats	Irene Fisher	3,003	4.89	−0.14
Total formal votes		61,411	97.21	−0.53
Informal votes		1,763	2.79	+0.53
Turnout		63,174	96.05	−0.79
Two-party-preferred result
Labor	Harry Quick	34,759	56.60	+1.92
Liberal	Jane Goodluck	26,652	43.40	−1.92
Labor hold		Swing	+1.92	

=== Lyons ===
1998 Australian federal election: Lyons
Party	Candidate	Votes	%	±%
Labor	Dick Adams	32,843	51.17	+6.74
Liberal	Richard Colbeck	21,543	33.56	−10.73
One Nation	Andrew Wilson	3,050	4.75	+4.75
Greens	Annie Willock	3,042	4.74	−1.06
Tasmania First	Darryl Gerrity	2,243	3.49	+3.49
Democrats	Bob Bensemann	1,469	2.29	−1.29
Total formal votes		64,190	96.79	−0.54
Informal votes		2,131	3.21	+0.54
Turnout		66,321	96.62	−0.17
Two-party-preferred result
Labor	Dick Adams	38,904	60.61	+9.30
Liberal	Richard Colbeck	25,286	39.39	−9.30
Labor hold		Swing	+9.30	

== See also ==
- Results of the 1996 Australian federal election (House of Representatives)
- Members of the Australian House of Representatives, 1996–1998
