= Results of the 2013 Australian federal election in Tasmania =

2013 Australian federal election (Tasmania)
- 7 September 2013

All 5 Tasmanian seats in the House of Representatives and all 12 seats in the Senate
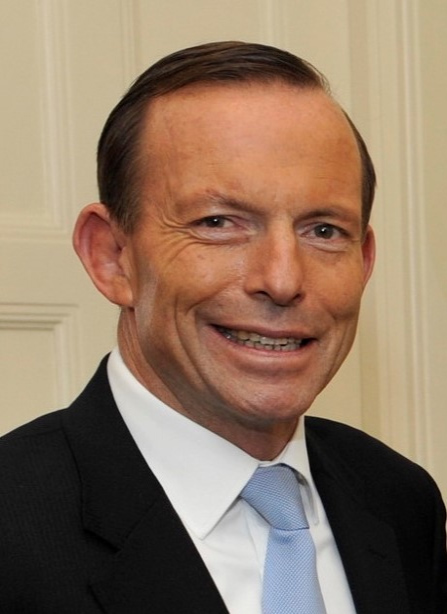

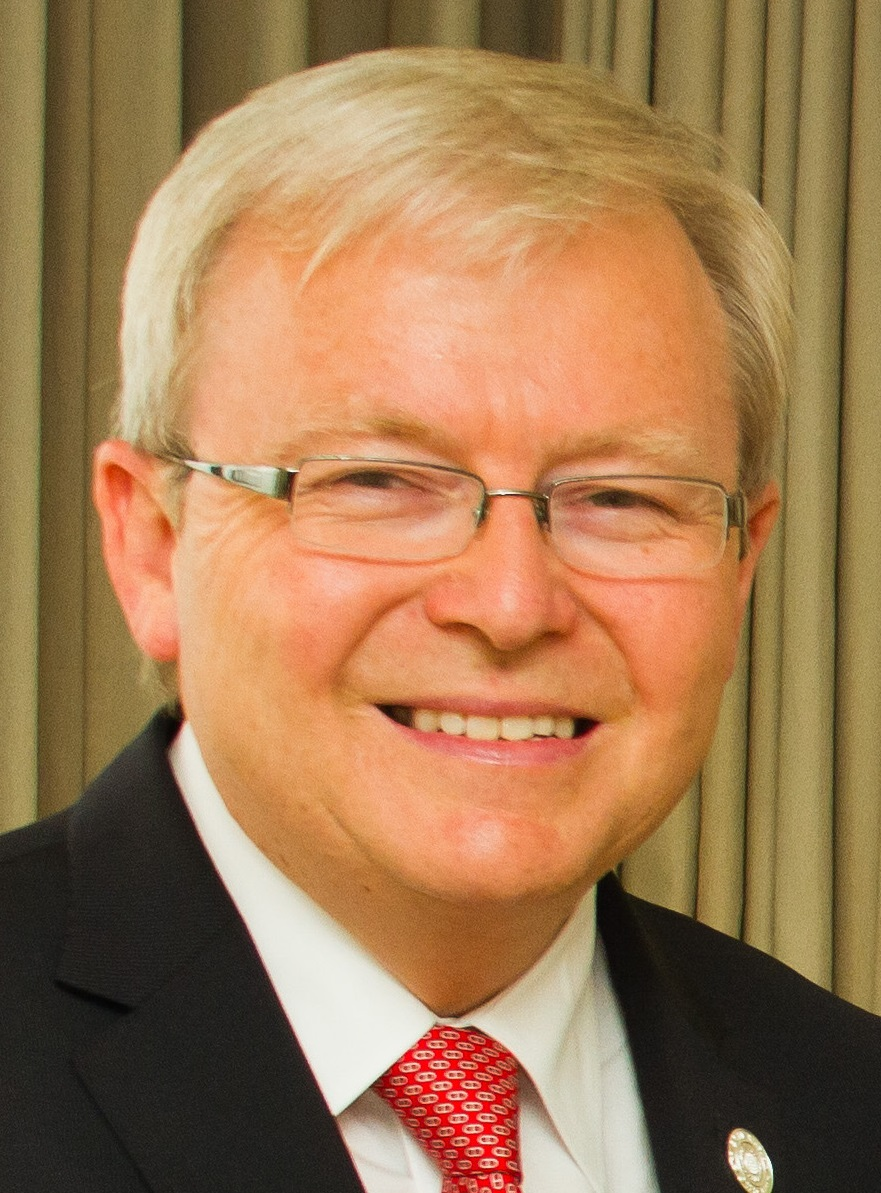
	First party	Second party
Leader	Tony Abbott	Kevin Rudd
Party	Liberal	Labor
Last election	0 seats	4 seats
Seats won	3 seats	1 seat
Seat change	▲3	▼3
Popular vote	132,961	114,977
Percentage	40.26%	34.81%
Swing	▲6.66	▼9.14
TPP	48.77%	51.23%
TPP swing	▲9.39	▼9.39
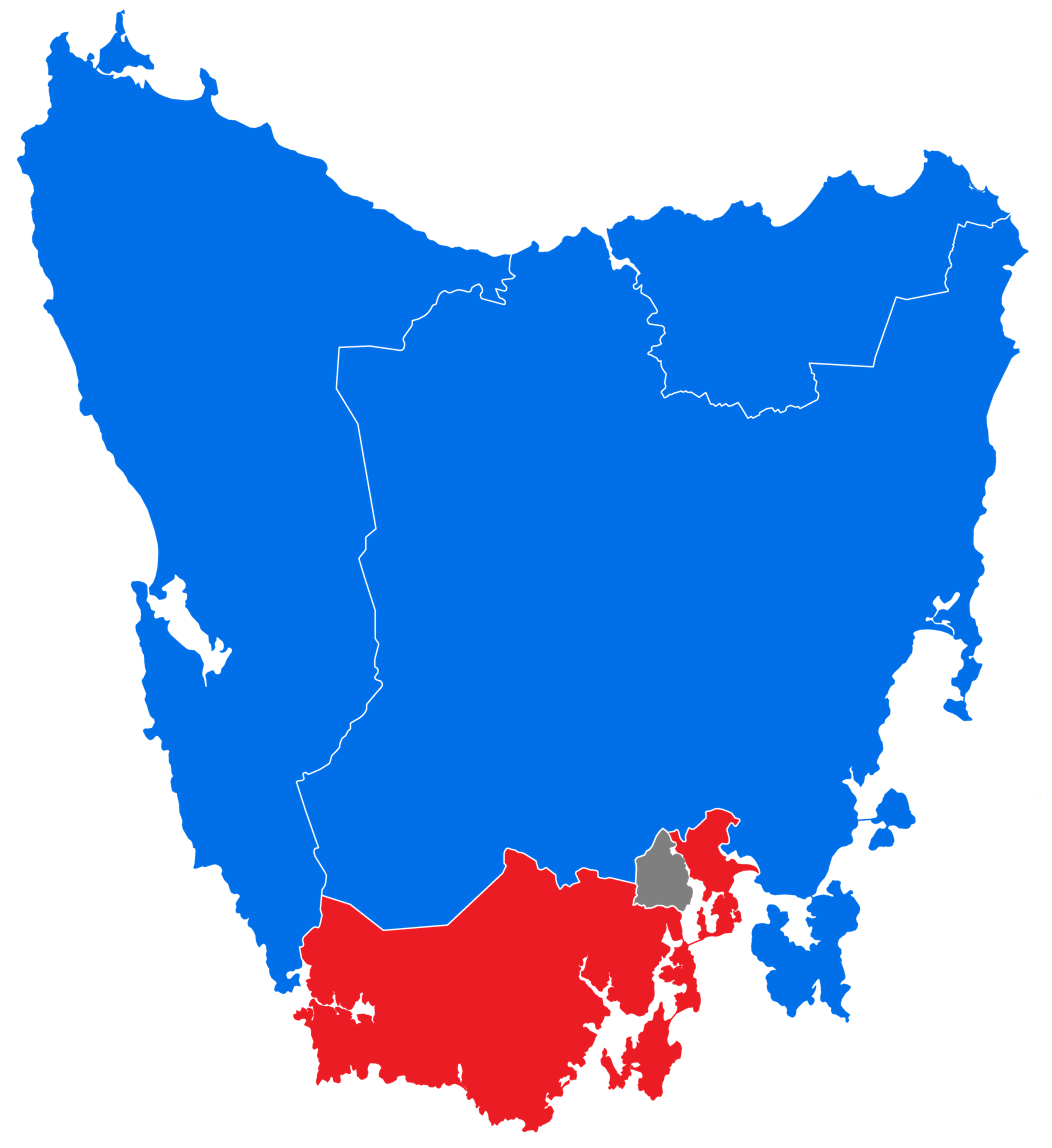

This is a list of electoral division results for the 2013 Australian federal election in the state of Tasmania.

== Overall result ==
Party	Votes	%	Swing	Seats	Change
Liberal Party of Australia	132,961	40.26	+6.66	3	▲3
Australian Labor Party	114,977	34.81	–9.14	1	▼3
Australian Greens	27,467	8.32	–8.50		
Palmer United Party	20,026	6.06	+6.06		
Family First Party	4,971	1.51	+1.51		
Rise Up Australia Party	1,824	0.55	+0.55		
Australian Christians	963	0.29	+0.29		
Australian Sex Party	877	0.27	+0.27		
Democratic Labour Party	554	0.17	+0.17		
Katter's Australian Party	478	0.14	+0.14		
Secular Party of Australia	384	0.12	–0.21		
Australian Stable Population Party	124	0.04	+0.04		
Independents	24,688	7.47	+2.69	1	Steady
Total	330,294			5	
Two-party-preferred vote
Australian Labor Party	169,208	51.23	–9.39	1	▼3
Liberal/National Coalition	161,086	48.77	+9.39	3	▲3

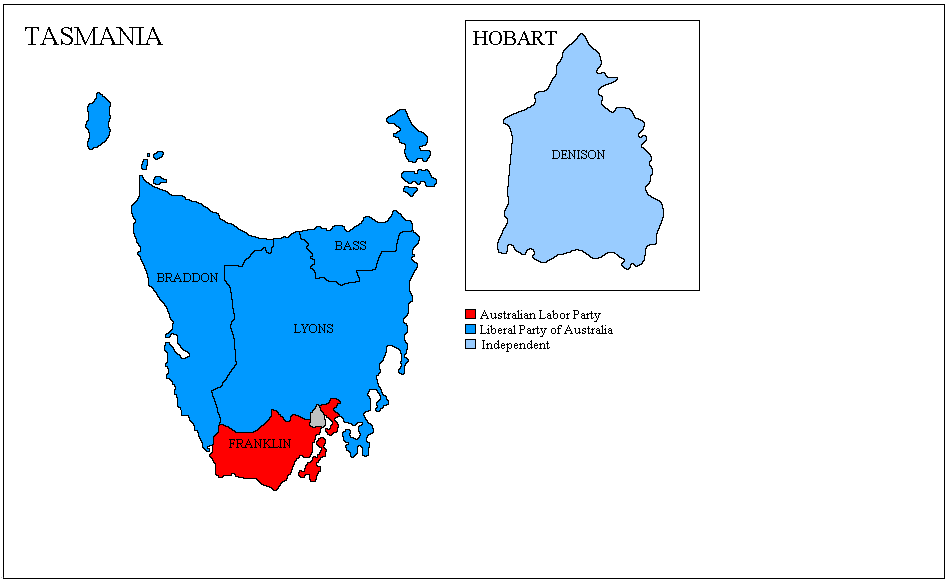
Electoral divisions: Tasmania

== Results by division ==
=== Bass ===
2013 Australian federal election: Bass
Party	Candidate	Votes	%	±%
Liberal	Andrew Nikolic	31,267	47.85	+8.14
Labor	Geoff Lyons	22,643	34.65	−8.78
Greens	Lucy Landon-Lane	5,160	7.90	−7.68
Palmer United	Christopher Dobson	3,520	5.39	+5.39
Family First	Christine Bergman	1,407	2.15	+2.15
Christians	Ray Kroeze	963	1.47	+1.47
Secular	Jin-oh Choi	384	0.59	+0.59
Total formal votes		65,344	95.82	−0.20
Informal votes		2,850	4.18	+0.20
Turnout		68,194	94.46	−0.70
Two-party-preferred result
Liberal	Andrew Nikolic	35,310	54.04	+10.78
Labor	Geoff Lyons	30,034	45.96	−10.78
Liberal gain from Labor		Swing	+10.78	

=== Braddon ===
2013 Australian federal election: Braddon
Party	Candidate	Votes	%	±%
Liberal	Brett Whiteley	30,904	46.86	+7.51
Labor	Sid Sidebottom	24,791	37.59	−11.09
Palmer United	Kevin Morgan	6,125	9.29	+9.29
Greens	Melissa Houghton	3,410	5.17	−6.79
Rise Up Australia	Bernard Shaw	726	1.10	+1.10
Total formal votes		65,956	96.45	+0.77
Informal votes		2,428	3.55	−0.77
Turnout		68,384	95.41	−0.24
Two-party-preferred result
Liberal	Brett Whiteley	34,668	52.56	+10.04
Labor	Sid Sidebottom	31,288	47.44	−10.04
Liberal gain from Labor		Swing	+10.04	

=== Denison ===
2013 Australian federal election: Denison
Party	Candidate	Votes	%	±%
Independent	Andrew Wilkie	24,688	38.08	+16.82
Labor	Jane Austin	16,043	24.75	−11.04
Liberal	Tanya Denison	15,058	23.23	+0.58
Greens	Anna Reynolds	5,133	7.92	−11.06
Palmer United	Debra Thurley	1,576	2.43	+2.43
Sex Party	Bob Butler	877	1.35	+1.35
Family First	Trevlyn McCallum	593	0.91	+0.91
Democratic Labour	Wayne Williams	554	0.85	+0.85
Rise Up Australia	Graeme Devlin	179	0.28	+0.28
Stable Population	Brandon Hoult	124	0.19	+0.19
Total formal votes		64,825	95.78	−0.60
Informal votes		2,856	4.22	+0.60
Turnout		67,681	94.31	−0.01
Notional two-party-preferred count
Labor	Jane Austin	38,186	58.91	−6.91
Liberal	Tanya Denison	26,639	41.09	+6.91
Two-candidate-preferred result
Independent	Andrew Wilkie	42,470	65.51	+14.30
Labor	Jane Austin	22,355	34.49	−14.30
Independent hold		Swing	+14.30	

=== Franklin ===
2013 Australian federal election: Franklin
Party	Candidate	Votes	%	±%
Labor	Julie Collins	26,893	39.93	−2.92
Liberal	Bernadette Black	26,070	38.71	+5.23
Greens	Rosalie Woodruff	8,201	12.18	−8.69
Palmer United	Marti Zucco	4,108	6.10	+6.10
Family First	Josh Downes	1,264	1.88	+1.88
Katter's Australian	Sarah Ugalde	478	0.71	+0.71
Rise Up Australia	Olwyn Bowden	330	0.49	+0.49
Total formal votes		67,344	96.23	−0.29
Informal votes		2,639	3.77	+0.29
Turnout		69,983	95.09	−0.37
Two-party-preferred result
Labor	Julie Collins	37,103	55.09	−5.73
Liberal	Bernadette Black	30,241	44.91	+5.73
Labor hold		Swing	−5.73	

=== Lyons ===
2013 Australian federal election: Lyons
Party	Candidate	Votes	%	±%
Liberal	Eric Hutchinson	29,662	44.39	+11.70
Labor	Dick Adams	24,607	36.82	−12.09
Greens	Pip Brinklow	5,563	8.32	−8.43
Palmer United	Quentin Von Stieglitz	4,697	7.03	+7.03
Family First	Gaye James	1,707	2.55	+2.55
Rise Up Australia	Julian Rogers	589	0.88	+0.88
Total formal votes		66,825	95.54	+0.34
Informal votes		3,119	4.46	−0.34
Turnout		69,944	94.64	−0.14
Two-party-preferred result
Liberal	Eric Hutchinson	34,228	51.22	+13.51
Labor	Dick Adams	32,597	48.78	−13.51
Liberal gain from Labor		Swing	+13.51	

== See also ==
- 2013 Australian federal election
- Results of the 2013 Australian federal election (House of Representatives)
- Post-election pendulum for the 2013 Australian federal election
- Members of the Australian House of Representatives, 2013–2016
