= Electoral results for the Division of Lyons =

Australian division election results

This is a list of electoral results for the Division of Lyons in Australian federal elections from the division's creation in 1984 until the present.

== Members ==
| Member | Party | Term |
|---|---|---|
| Max Burr | Liberal | 1984–1993 |
| Dick Adams | Labor | 1993–2013 |
| Eric Hutchinson | Liberal | 2013–2016 |
| Brian Mitchell | Labor | 2016–2025 |
| Rebecca White | Labor | 2025–present |

== Election results ==
=== Elections in the 2020s ===
==== 2025 ====
2025 Australian federal election: Lyons
| Party | Candidate | Votes | % | ±% |
|---|---|---|---|---|
| Labor | Rebecca White | 33,100 | 43.08 | +14.04 |
| Liberal | Susie Bower | 20,135 | 26.21 | −11.01 |
| Greens | Alistair Allan | 8,362 | 10.88 | −0.55 |
| One Nation | Shaun Broadby | 5,165 | 6.72 | +1.37 |
| Trumpet of Patriots | Sarah Graham | 3,628 | 4.72 | +4.72 |
| Shooters, Fishers, Farmers | Carlo Di Falco | 3,457 | 4.50 | +4.50 |
| Independent | Angela Offord | 2,462 | 3.20 | +3.20 |
| Citizens | Michael Phibbs | 523 | 0.68 | +0.68 |
| Total formal votes | | 76,832 | 93.08 | −0.62 |
| Informal votes | | 5,715 | 6.92 | +0.62 |
| Turnout | | 82,547 | 92.77 | +0.87 |
Two-party-preferred result
| Labor | Rebecca White | 47,316 | 61.58 | +10.66 |
| Liberal | Susie Bower | 29,516 | 38.42 | −10.66 |
| Labor hold | | Swing | +10.66 | |

==== 2022 ====
2022 Australian federal election: Lyons
| Party | Candidate | Votes | % | ±% |
|---|---|---|---|---|
| Liberal | Susie Bower | 27,296 | 37.22 | +13.04 |
| Labor | Brian Mitchell | 21,295 | 29.04 | −7.42 |
| Greens | Liz Johnstone | 8,382 | 11.43 | +1.98 |
| Lambie | Troy Pfitzner | 7,962 | 10.86 | +10.86 |
| One Nation | Emma Goyne | 3,927 | 5.35 | −2.78 |
| United Australia | Jason Evans | 1,976 | 2.69 | −3.41 |
| Animal Justice | Anna Gralton | 1,312 | 1.79 | +1.79 |
| Liberal Democrats | Rhys Griffiths | 1,188 | 1.62 | +1.62 |
| Total formal votes | | 73,338 | 93.70 | −1.73 |
| Informal votes | | 4,932 | 6.30 | +1.73 |
| Turnout | | 78,270 | 91.90 | −2.28 |
Two-party-preferred result
| Labor | Brian Mitchell | 37,341 | 50.92 | −4.26 |
| Liberal | Susie Bower | 35,997 | 49.08 | +4.26 |
| Labor hold | | Swing | −4.26 | |

Alluvial diagram for preference flows in the seat of Lyons in the 2022 federal election. indicates at what stage the winning candidate had over 50% of the votes and was declared the winner.

=== Elections in the 2010s ===
==== 2019 ====
2019 Australian federal election: Lyons
| Party | Candidate | Votes | % | ±% |
|---|---|---|---|---|
| Labor | Brian Mitchell | 26,091 | 36.46 | −3.93 |
| Liberal | Jessica Whelan | 17,301 | 24.18 | −16.44 |
| National | Deanna Hutchinson | 11,222 | 15.68 | +15.68 |
| Greens | Gary Whisson | 6,765 | 9.45 | +0.26 |
| One Nation | Tennille Murtagh | 5,820 | 8.13 | +8.13 |
| United Australia | Michael Warne | 4,365 | 6.10 | +6.10 |
| Total formal votes | | 71,564 | 95.43 | −0.14 |
| Informal votes | | 3,427 | 4.57 | +0.14 |
| Turnout | | 74,991 | 94.18 | +0.76 |
Two-party-preferred result
| Labor | Brian Mitchell | 39,491 | 55.18 | +1.35 |
| Liberal | Jessica Whelan | 32,073 | 44.82 | −1.35 |
| Labor hold | | Swing | +1.35 | |

==== 2016 ====
2016 Australian federal election: Lyons
| Party | Candidate | Votes | % | ±% |
|---|---|---|---|---|
| Liberal | Eric Hutchinson | 28,697 | 41.88 | −2.51 |
| Labor | Brian Mitchell | 26,426 | 38.57 | +1.75 |
| Greens | Hannah Rubenach-Quinn | 6,418 | 9.37 | +1.05 |
| Recreational Fishers | Shelley Shay | 4,322 | 6.31 | +6.31 |
| Renewable Energy | Duncan Livingston | 1,578 | 2.30 | +2.30 |
| Christian Democrats | Gene Mawer | 1,074 | 1.57 | +1.57 |
| Total formal votes | | 68,515 | 95.57 | +0.03 |
| Informal votes | | 3,174 | 4.43 | −0.03 |
| Turnout | | 71,689 | 93.54 | −0.99 |
Two-party-preferred result
| Labor | Brian Mitchell | 35,838 | 52.31 | +3.53 |
| Liberal | Eric Hutchinson | 32,677 | 47.69 | −3.53 |
| Labor gain from Liberal | | Swing | +3.53 | |

==== 2013 ====
2013 Australian federal election: Lyons
| Party | Candidate | Votes | % | ±% |
|---|---|---|---|---|
| Liberal | Eric Hutchinson | 29,662 | 44.39 | +11.70 |
| Labor | Dick Adams | 24,607 | 36.82 | −12.09 |
| Greens | Pip Brinklow | 5,563 | 8.32 | −8.43 |
| Palmer United | Quentin Von Stieglitz | 4,697 | 7.03 | +7.03 |
| Family First | Gaye James | 1,707 | 2.55 | +2.55 |
| Rise Up Australia | Julian Rogers | 589 | 0.88 | +0.88 |
| Total formal votes | | 66,825 | 95.54 | +0.34 |
| Informal votes | | 3,119 | 4.46 | −0.34 |
| Turnout | | 69,944 | 94.64 | −0.14 |
Two-party-preferred result
| Liberal | Eric Hutchinson | 34,228 | 51.22 | +13.51 |
| Labor | Dick Adams | 32,597 | 48.78 | −13.51 |
| Liberal gain from Labor | | Swing | +13.51 | |

==== 2010 ====
2010 Australian federal election: Lyons
| Party | Candidate | Votes | % | ±% |
|---|---|---|---|---|
| Labor | Dick Adams | 32,164 | 48.91 | +5.42 |
| Liberal | Eric Hutchinson | 21,493 | 32.69 | −0.79 |
| Greens | Karen Cassidy | 11,013 | 16.75 | +5.79 |
| Secular | Lucas Noyes | 1,085 | 1.65 | +1.65 |
| Total formal votes | | 65,755 | 95.20 | −1.74 |
| Informal votes | | 3,316 | 4.80 | +1.74 |
| Turnout | | 69,071 | 94.79 | −0.05 |
Two-party-preferred result
| Labor | Dick Adams | 40,959 | 62.29 | +3.95 |
| Liberal | Eric Hutchinson | 24,796 | 37.71 | −3.95 |
| Labor hold | | Swing | +3.95 | |

=== Elections in the 2000s ===
==== 2007 ====
2007 Australian federal election: Lyons
| Party | Candidate | Votes | % | ±% |
|---|---|---|---|---|
| Labor | Dick Adams | 27,374 | 43.15 | −1.41 |
| Liberal | Geoff Page | 20,643 | 32.54 | −9.79 |
| Greens | Karen Cassidy | 7,089 | 11.17 | +1.22 |
| Independent | Ben Quin | 6,092 | 9.60 | +9.60 |
| Family First | Amy Parsons | 1,427 | 2.25 | −0.40 |
| Citizens Electoral Council | Ray Williams | 819 | 1.29 | +0.78 |
| Total formal votes | | 63,444 | 96.94 | +0.89 |
| Informal votes | | 2,005 | 3.06 | −0.89 |
| Turnout | | 65,449 | 95.72 | +0.06 |
Two-party-preferred result
| Labor | Dick Adams | 37,292 | 58.78 | +5.10 |
| Liberal | Geoff Page | 26,152 | 41.22 | −5.10 |
| Labor hold | | Swing | +5.10 | |

==== 2004 ====
2004 Australian federal election: Lyons
| Party | Candidate | Votes | % | ±% |
|---|---|---|---|---|
| Labor | Dick Adams | 26,994 | 44.56 | −2.70 |
| Liberal | Ben Quin | 25,647 | 42.33 | +6.52 |
| Greens | Glenn Millar | 6,036 | 9.95 | +2.91 |
| Family First | Marie Papiccio | 1,606 | 2.65 | +2.65 |
| Citizens Electoral Council | Saul Jenkins | 311 | 0.51 | +0.51 |
| Total formal votes | | 60,584 | 96.05 | −0.41 |
| Informal votes | | 2,494 | 3.95 | +0.41 |
| Turnout | | 63,078 | 95.66 | −0.52 |
Two-party-preferred result
| Labor | Dick Adams | 32,519 | 53.68 | −4.49 |
| Liberal | Ben Quin | 28,065 | 46.32 | +4.49 |
| Labor hold | | Swing | −4.49 | |

==== 2001 ====
2001 Australian federal election: Lyons
| Party | Candidate | Votes | % | ±% |
|---|---|---|---|---|
| Labor | Dick Adams | 27,596 | 47.26 | −4.35 |
| Liberal | Geoff Page | 20,913 | 35.81 | +2.87 |
| Greens | Tim Morris | 4,113 | 7.04 | +2.27 |
| One Nation | Neil Batchelor | 3,141 | 5.38 | +0.55 |
| Democrats | Sonia Anderson | 2,630 | 4.50 | +2.22 |
| Total formal votes | | 58,393 | 96.46 | −0.38 |
| Informal votes | | 2,146 | 3.54 | +0.38 |
| Turnout | | 60,539 | 96.71 | |
Two-party-preferred result
| Labor | Dick Adams | 33,970 | 58.17 | −2.94 |
| Liberal | Geoff Page | 24,423 | 41.83 | +2.94 |
| Labor hold | | Swing | −2.94 | |

=== Elections in the 1990s ===
==== 1998 ====
1998 Australian federal election: Lyons
| Party | Candidate | Votes | % | ±% |
|---|---|---|---|---|
| Labor | Dick Adams | 32,843 | 51.17 | +6.74 |
| Liberal | Richard Colbeck | 21,543 | 33.56 | −10.73 |
| One Nation | Andrew Wilson | 3,050 | 4.75 | +4.75 |
| Greens | Annie Willock | 3,042 | 4.74 | −1.06 |
| Tasmania First | Darryl Gerrity | 2,243 | 3.49 | +3.49 |
| Democrats | Bob Bensemann | 1,469 | 2.29 | −1.29 |
| Total formal votes | | 64,190 | 96.79 | −0.54 |
| Informal votes | | 2,131 | 3.21 | +0.54 |
| Turnout | | 66,321 | 96.62 | −0.17 |
Two-party-preferred result
| Labor | Dick Adams | 38,904 | 60.61 | +9.30 |
| Liberal | Richard Colbeck | 25,286 | 39.39 | −9.30 |
| Labor hold | | Swing | +9.30 | |

==== 1996 ====
1996 Australian federal election: Lyons
| Party | Candidate | Votes | % | ±% |
|---|---|---|---|---|
| Labor | Dick Adams | 28,363 | 44.42 | −3.01 |
| Liberal | Russell Anderson | 28,276 | 44.29 | +0.45 |
| Greens | Debra Manskey | 3,706 | 5.80 | −0.71 |
| Democrats | Duncan Mills | 2,282 | 3.57 | +1.36 |
| National | Leigh de la Motte | 1,218 | 1.91 | +1.91 |
| Total formal votes | | 63,845 | 97.33 | +0.21 |
| Informal votes | | 1,754 | 2.67 | −0.21 |
| Turnout | | 65,599 | 96.79 | +0.26 |
Two-party-preferred result
| Labor | Dick Adams | 32,682 | 51.31 | −2.47 |
| Liberal | Russell Anderson | 31,015 | 48.69 | +2.47 |
| Labor hold | | Swing | −2.47 | |

==== 1993 ====
1993 Australian federal election: Lyons
| Party | Candidate | Votes | % | ±% |
|---|---|---|---|---|
| Labor | Dick Adams | 29,211 | 47.43 | +5.63 |
| Liberal | Rene Hidding | 26,996 | 43.83 | −5.04 |
| Greens | Michael Morris | 4,015 | 6.52 | +6.52 |
| Democrats | Leonie Godridge | 1,365 | 2.22 | −7.11 |
| Total formal votes | | 61,587 | 97.11 | +1.25 |
| Informal votes | | 1,831 | 2.89 | −1.25 |
| Turnout | | 63,418 | 96.53 | |
Two-party-preferred result
| Labor | Dick Adams | 33,107 | 53.78 | +5.72 |
| Liberal | Rene Hidding | 28,456 | 46.22 | −5.72 |
| Labor gain from Liberal | | Swing | +5.72 | |

==== 1990 ====
1990 Australian federal election: Lyons
| Party | Candidate | Votes | % | ±% |
|---|---|---|---|---|
| Liberal | Max Burr | 28,729 | 49.0 | −1.9 |
| Labor | Bob Gordon | 24,373 | 41.6 | +0.3 |
| Democrats | Mike Hancock | 5,542 | 9.5 | +1.7 |
| Total formal votes | | 58,644 | 95.9 | |
| Informal votes | | 2,510 | 4.1 | |
| Turnout | | 61,154 | 96.3 | |
Two-party-preferred result
| Liberal | Max Burr | 30,526 | 52.1 | −2.3 |
| Labor | Bob Gordon | 28,071 | 47.9 | +2.3 |
| Liberal hold | | Swing | −2.3 | |

=== Elections in the 1980s ===
==== 1987 ====
1987 Australian federal election:Lyons
| Party | Candidate | Votes | % | ±% |
|---|---|---|---|---|
| Liberal | Max Burr | 27,645 | 50.9 | +1.4 |
| Labor | Dick Adams | 22,435 | 41.3 | −3.7 |
| Democrats | Liz Holloway | 4,236 | 7.8 | +2.3 |
| Total formal votes | | 54,316 | 93.6 | |
| Informal votes | | 3,684 | 6.4 | |
| Turnout | | 58,000 | 96.6 | |
Two-party-preferred result
| Liberal | Max Burr | 29,555 | 54.4 | +3.1 |
| Labor | Dick Adams | 24,754 | 45.6 | −3.1 |
| Liberal hold | | Swing | +3.1 | |

==== 1984 ====
1984 Australian federal election: Lyons
| Party | Candidate | Votes | % | ±% |
|---|---|---|---|---|
| Liberal | Max Burr | 25,407 | 49.5 | −4.3 |
| Labor | David Llewellyn | 23,119 | 45.0 | +2.7 |
| Democrats | Liz Holloway | 2,845 | 5.5 | +3.0 |
| Total formal votes | | 51,371 | 93.4 | |
| Informal votes | | 3,603 | 6.6 | |
| Turnout | | 54,974 | 95.8 | |
Two-party-preferred result
| Liberal | Max Burr | 26,368 | 51.3 | −3.7 |
| Labor | David Llewellyn | 24,990 | 48.7 | +3.7 |
| Liberal notional hold | | Swing | −3.7 | |
