= Post-election pendulum for the 2007 Australian federal election =

The following pendulum is known as the Mackerras pendulum, invented by psephologist Malcolm Mackerras. Designed for the outcome of the 2007 federal election, the pendulum works by lining up all of the seats held in Parliament, 83 Labor, 55 Liberal, 10 National, and 2 independent, according to the percentage point margin on a two candidate preferred basis, as elected in 2007. The two candidate result is also known as the swing required for the seat to change hands. Given a uniform swing to the opposition or government parties in an election, the number of seats that change hands can be predicted. Swing is never uniform, but in practice variations of swing among the Australian states usually tend to cancel each other out. Seats are arranged in safeness categories according to the Australian Electoral Commission's classification of safeness. "Safe" seats require a swing of over 10 per cent to change, "fairly safe" seats require a swing of between 6 and 10 per cent, while "marginal" seats require a swing of less than 6 per cent.

Government seats (83)
Marginal (25)
Robertson (NSW)	Belinda Neal	ALP	0.11
Flynn (Qld)	Chris Trevor	ALP	0.16
Solomon (NT)	Damian Hale	ALP	0.19
Corangamite (Vic)	Darren Cheeseman	ALP	0.85
Bass (Tas)	Jodie Campbell	ALP	1.00
Hasluck (WA)	Sharryn Jackson	ALP	1.26
Bennelong (NSW)	Maxine McKew	ALP	1.40
Deakin (Vic)	Mike Symon	ALP	1.41
Braddon (Tas)	Sid Sidebottom	ALP	1.44
Petrie (Qld)	Yvette D'Ath	ALP	2.05
Page (NSW)	Janelle Saffin	ALP	2.36
Forde (Qld)	Brett Raguse	ALP	2.91
Dawson (Qld)	James Bidgood	ALP	3.21
Eden-Monaro (NSW)	Mike Kelly	ALP	3.40
Longman (Qld)	Jon Sullivan	ALP	3.57
Dobell (NSW)	Craig Thomson	ALP	3.90
Leichhardt (Qld)	Jim Turnour	ALP	4.03
Kingston (SA)	Amanda Rishworth	ALP	4.42
Blair (Qld)	Shayne Neumann	ALP	4.48
Franklin (Tas)	Julie Collins	ALP	4.48
Bonner (Qld)	Kerry Rea	ALP	4.53
Melbourne (Vic)	Lindsay Tanner	ALP	4.71 v GRN
Moreton (Qld)	Graham Perrett	ALP	4.75
Hindmarsh (SA)	Steve Georganas	ALP	5.05
Brand (WA)	Gary Gray	ALP	5.62
Fairly safe (21)
Bendigo (Vic)	Steve Gibbons	ALP	6.13
Wakefield (SA)	Nick Champion	ALP	6.59
Brisbane (Qld)	Arch Bevis	ALP	6.76
Lindsay (NSW)	David Bradbury	ALP	6.78
Parramatta (NSW)	Julie Owens	ALP	6.88
Macquarie (NSW)	Bob Debus	ALP	7.04
Melbourne Ports (Vic)	Michael Danby	ALP	7.15
Lowe (NSW)	John Murphy	ALP	7.37
Chisholm (Vic)	Anna Burke	ALP	7.38
Isaacs (Vic)	Mark Dreyfus	ALP	7.69
Makin (SA)	Tony Zappia	ALP	7.70
Ballarat (Vic)	Catherine King	ALP	8.15
Bruce (Vic)	Alan Griffin	ALP	8.32
Adelaide (SA)	Kate Ellis	ALP	8.53
Lilley (Qld)	Wayne Swan	ALP	8.59
Lyons (Tas)	Dick Adams	ALP	8.78
Perth (WA)	Stephen Smith	ALP	8.85
Richmond (NSW)	Justine Elliot	ALP	8.87
Corio (Vic)	Richard Marles	ALP	8.93
Jagajaga (Vic)	Jenny Macklin	ALP	8.98
Fremantle (WA)	Melissa Parke	ALP	9.14
Safe (28)
Banks (NSW)	Daryl Melham	ALP	11.08
Lingiari (NT)	Warren Snowdon	ALP	11.16
Holt (Vic)	Anthony Byrne	ALP	11.63
Rankin (Qld)	Craig Emerson	ALP	11.74
Canberra (ACT)	Annette Ellis	ALP	11.82
Barton (NSW)	Robert McClelland	ALP	12.10
Griffith (Qld)	Kevin Rudd	ALP	12.32
Capricornia (Qld)	Kirsten Livermore	ALP	12.71
Charlton (NSW)	Greg Combet	ALP	12.87
Hotham (Vic)	Simon Crean	ALP	13.00
Kingsford Smith (NSW)	Peter Garrett	ALP	13.29
Prospect (NSW)	Chris Bowen	ALP	13.46
Oxley (Qld)	Bernie Ripoll	ALP	14.13
Shortland (NSW)	Jill Hall	ALP	14.74
Fraser (ACT)	Bob McMullan	ALP	15.07
Werriwa (NSW)	Chris Hayes	ALP	15.24
Maribyrnong (Vic)	Bill Shorten	ALP	15.32
Lalor (Vic)	Julia Gillard	ALP	15.53
Denison (Tas)	Duncan Kerr	ALP	15.63
Newcastle (NSW)	Sharon Grierson	ALP	15.91
Hunter (NSW)	Joel Fitzgibbon	ALP	15.92
Reid (NSW)	Laurie Ferguson	ALP	16.80
Cunningham (NSW)	Sharon Bird	ALP	18.13
Fowler (NSW)	Julia Irwin	ALP	18.25
Blaxland (NSW)	Jason Clare	ALP	18.37
Calwell (Vic)	Maria Vamvakinou	ALP	19.33
Sydney (NSW)	Tanya Plibersek	ALP	19.50
Port Adelaide (SA)	Mark Butler	ALP	19.75
Very safe (9)
Watson (NSW)	Tony Burke	ALP	20.33
Chifley (NSW)	Roger Price	ALP	20.66
Scullin (Vic)	Harry Jenkins	ALP	20.85
Gorton (Vic)	Brendan O'Connor	ALP	21.22
Gellibrand (Vic)	Nicola Roxon	ALP	21.46
Wills (Vic)	Kelvin Thomson	ALP	22.41
Throsby (NSW)	Jennie George	ALP	23.46
Grayndler (NSW)	Anthony Albanese	ALP	24.93
Batman (Vic)	Martin Ferguson	ALP	25.95

Opposition seats (65)
Marginal (32)
McEwen (Vic)	Fran Bailey	LIB	0.01
Bowman (Qld)	Andrew Laming	LIB	0.04
Swan (WA)	Steve Irons	LIB	0.11
Dickson (Qld)	Peter Dutton	LIB	0.13
Herbert (Qld)	Peter Lindsay	LIB	0.21
La Trobe (Vic)	Jason Wood	LIB	0.51
Macarthur (NSW)	Pat Farmer	LIB	0.72
Sturt (SA)	Christopher Pyne	LIB	0.94
Cowper (NSW)	Luke Hartsuyker	NAT	1.23
Stirling (WA)	Michael Keenan	LIB	1.29
Paterson (NSW)	Bob Baldwin	LIB	1.51
Hinkler (Qld)	Paul Neville	NAT	1.69
Cowan (WA)	Luke Simpkins	LIB	1.71
Hughes (NSW)	Danna Vale	LIB	2.16
Kalgoorlie (WA)	Barry Haase	LIB	2.58
Boothby (SA)	Andrew Southcott	LIB	2.93
Fairfax (Qld)	Alex Somlyay	LIB	3.01
Fisher (Qld)	Peter Slipper	LIB	3.10
Ryan (Qld)	Michael Johnson	LIB	3.82
Wentworth (NSW)	Malcolm Turnbull	LIB	3.85
Dunkley (Vic)	Bruce Billson	LIB	4.04
Gilmore (NSW)	Joanna Gash	LIB	4.07
Hume (NSW)	Alby Schultz	LIB	4.16
Grey (SA)	Rowan Ramsey	LIB	4.43
Greenway (NSW)	Louise Markus	LIB	4.50
McMillan (Vic)	Russell Broadbent	LIB	4.79
Aston (Vic)	Chris Pearce	LIB	5.05
North Sydney (NSW)	Joe Hockey	LIB	5.38
Canning (WA)	Don Randall	LIB	5.58
Forrest (WA)	Nola Marino	LIB	5.83
Gippsland (Vic)	Peter McGauran	NAT	5.91
Casey (Vic)	Tony Smith	LIB	5.93
Fairly safe (19)
Menzies (Vic)	Kevin Andrews	LIB	6.02
Goldstein (Vic)	Andrew Robb	LIB	6.05
Cook (NSW)	Scott Morrison	LIB	6.57
Higgins (Vic)	Peter Costello	LIB	7.04
Mayo (SA)	Alexander Downer	LIB	7.06
Wannon (Vic)	David Hawker	LIB	7.47
Groom (Qld)	Ian Macfarlane	LIB	8.22
Flinders (Vic)	Greg Hunt	LIB	8.25
Wide Bay (Qld)	Warren Truss	NAT	8.47
Lyne (NSW)	Mark Vaile	NAT	8.58
Tangney (WA)	Dennis Jensen	LIB	8.68
McPherson (Qld)	Margaret May	LIB	8.83
Berowra (NSW)	Philip Ruddock	LIB	8.94
Pearce (WA)	Judi Moylan	LIB	9.07
Moore (WA)	Mal Washer	LIB	9.17
Indi (Vic)	Sophie Mirabella	LIB	9.19
Barker (SA)	Patrick Secker	LIB	9.45
Warringah (NSW)	Tony Abbott	LIB	9.50
Kooyong (Vic)	Petro Georgiou	LIB	9.53
Safe (13)
Fadden (Qld)	Stuart Robert	LIB	10.20
Farrer (NSW)	Sussan Ley	LIB	11.17
Mitchell (NSW)	Alex Hawke	LIB	11.59
Calare (NSW)	John Cobb	NAT	12.05
Mackellar (NSW)	Bronwyn Bishop	LIB	12.42
Parkes (NSW)	Mark Coulton	NAT	13.04
Bradfield (NSW)	Brendan Nelson	LIB	13.45
Curtin (WA)	Julie Bishop	LIB	13.57
Moncrieff (Qld)	Steven Ciobo	LIB	14.01
Maranoa (Qld)	Bruce Scott	NAT	14.44
Riverina (NSW)	Kay Hull	NAT	16.23
O'Connor (WA)	Wilson Tuckey	LIB	16.55
Murray (Vic)	Sharman Stone	LIB	18.26
Very safe (1)
Mallee (Vic)	John Forrest	NAT	21.27
Crossbench (2)
Kennedy (Qld)	Bob Katter	IND	16.29 v ALP
New England (NSW)	Tony Windsor	IND	24.33 v NAT
