= Lyons Forum =

The Lyons Forum was a ginger group or informal political faction comprising some federal members of conservative Australian parliamentary parties. It was formed in the early 1990s and was active both in Liberal Party of Australia parliamentary leadership conflict and on family policy issues. The faction was sometimes disparagingly called "The God Squad". In 2004, it was described as "defunct" by Michelle Grattan.

== Formation ==
The Lyons Forum was formed in 1992 by a group of Coalition members of parliament, including Senator John Herron, Senator Eric Abetz, Senator John Tierney, Alan Cadman, John Bradford, Chris Miles, Kevin Andrews and John Forrest. The group's name was a reference to a slogan used by former member of parliament Dame Enid Lyons: "The foundation of a nation's greatness is in the homes of its people". The organisation had many active Christian members, and had been described as the "Coalition's fundamentalist Christian faction". However, while its observers have noted close relationships between its members and conservative Christian groups and theology, no formal relationship existed.

== Role ==
The Lyons Forum was reported to have played a role in supporting the rise of John Howard to the Liberal leadership in the mid-1990s. It was also prominent in debates about tax policy in relation to families, as well as other policy issues in relation to families, marriage, and sexuality.

== See also ==
- National Right (Liberal Party of Australia)
