= Ron Davies (Tasmanian politician) =

Australian politician

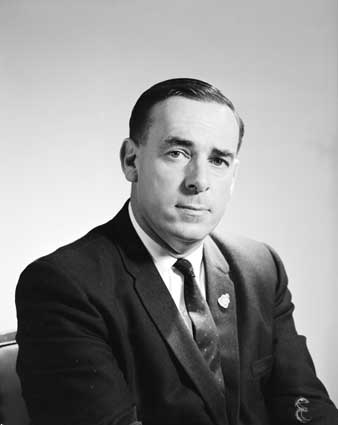

Member of the Australian Parliament for Braddon
- In office 22 November 1958 – 13 December 1975
- Preceded by: Aubrey Luck
- Succeeded by: Ray Groom

Personal details
- Born: 25 July 1919 Latrobe, Tasmania, Australia
- Died: 5 June 1980 (aged 60) Hong Kong
- Party: Labor
- Children: Glen Davies (son)
- Occupation: Teacher

Ronald Davies (25 July 1919 – 5 June 1980) was an Australian politician. He was a member of the Australian Labor Party (ALP) and served in the House of Representatives from 1958 to 1975, representing the Tasmanian seat of Braddon. He was a schoolteacher before entering politics.

== Early life ==
Davies was born on 25 July 1919 in Latrobe, Tasmania. He was the son of Margaret and William Davies; his father was a blacksmith. He was raised in Latrobe, attending Latrobe Primary School and going on to Devonport High School. He later qualified as a teacher at the University of Tasmania.

In November 1942, Davies enlisted in the Royal Australian Air Force (RAAF). During World War II he was stationed for periods at No. 2 Air Observers School in Mount Gambier, South Australia (1943), RAAF Base Laverton (1943), No. 10 Elementary Flying Training School in Temora, New South Wales (1943–1944), No. 82 Wing RAAF (1944), No. 2 Squadron RAAF (1944–1945), and No. 56 Operational Base Unit (1945). He obtained the rank of leading aircraftman and was discharged in May 1945.

In 1954, Davies was appointed headmaster of the Edith Creek Area School, a new school in the rural locality of Edith Creek. He had previously taught at Queenstown on Tasmania's west coast. He was an advocate of the "Education by Travel" scheme promoted by the Young Australia League and established links between his school and King Island.

== Politics ==
Davies was elected to the House of Representatives at the 1958 federal election, winning the seat of Braddon for the ALP from the incumbent Liberal MP Aubrey Luck. He was re-elected on six further occasions.

In parliament, Davies served on the Joint Standing Committee on Foreign Affairs from 1967 to 1969. He advocated for mixed-race children fathered by Australian servicemen in Japan to be allowed admission to Australia, which had been refused by the federal government under the White Australia policy. He also took a particular interest in the remote community of King Island, lobbying for additional infrastructure and services for the island.

At the 1975 election, Davies lost his seat to Liberal candidate Ray Groom in the landslide defeat of the Whitlam government. He was endorsed to re-contest his seat at the 1977 election, but withdrew his candidacy in April 1977 citing "personal reasons".

== Personal life ==
Davies had a long association with competitive woodchopping in Tasmania. He was chairman of the Australian Axemen's Council and played a key role in "lifting it from a backyard sport to a semi-professional sport". He help organise annual woodchopping carnivals on King Island, which saw large numbers of visitors from Tasmania and Victoria. He was also involved with the World Centenary of Woodchopping in Latrobe in 1970 and joined woodchopping tours to Indonesia, New Zealand and Papua New Guinea.

Davies died of a heart attack on 5 June 1980, aged 60, while on holiday in Hong Kong following a woodchopping tour to Indonesia. He was predeceased by his wife Jenny and survived by two children, including Glen Davies, who was a state MP.

Parliament of Australia
| Preceded by Aubrey Luck | Member for Braddon; 1958 – 1975 | Succeeded by Ray Groom |
