= Chris Miles (politician) =

Australian politician (born 1947)

The Honourable Chris Miles
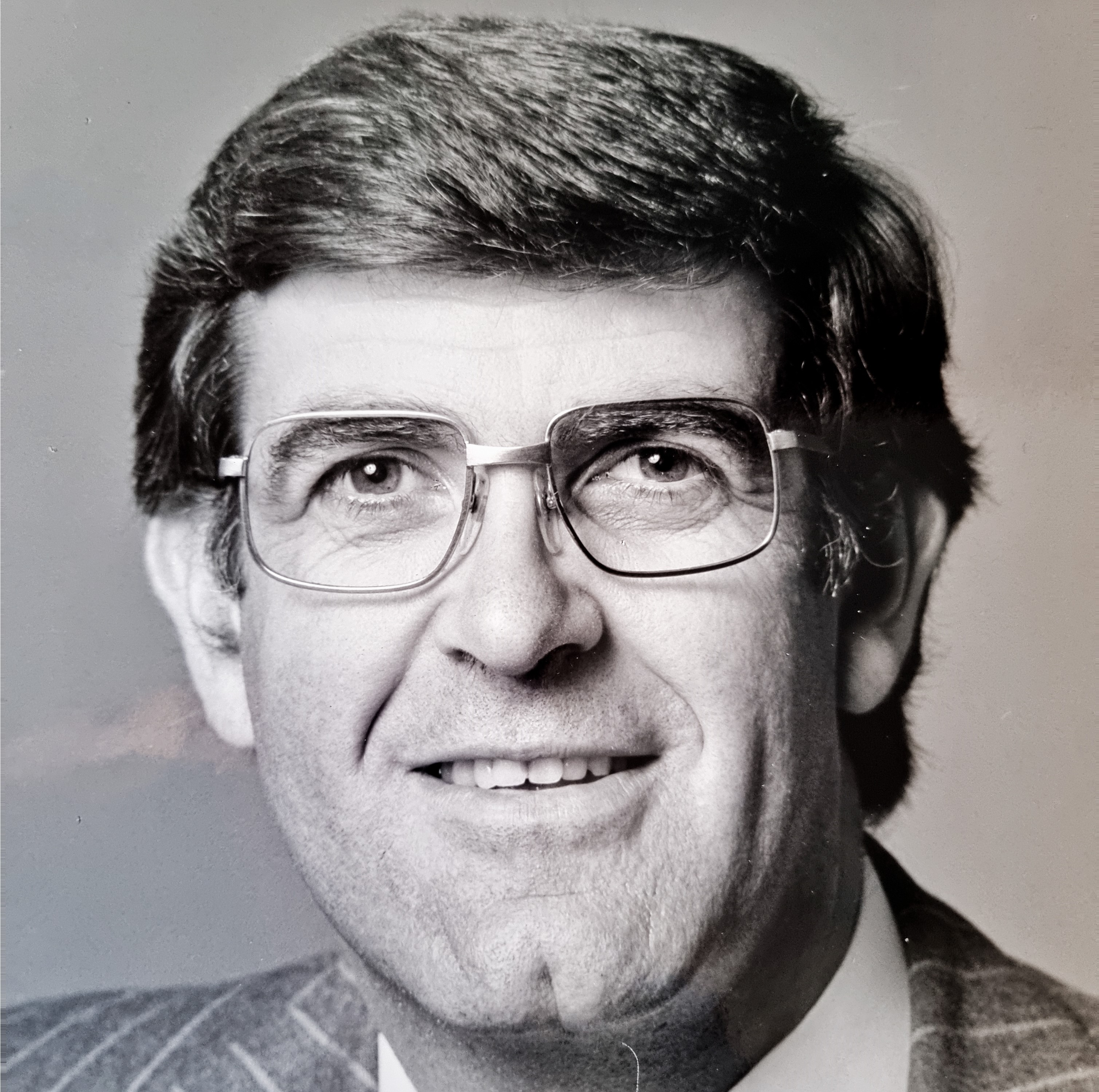
- Miles in 1985

Member of the Australian Parliament for Braddon
- In office 1 December 1984 – 3 October 1998
- Preceded by: Ray Groom
- Succeeded by: Sid Sidebottom

Personal details
- Born: 21 August 1947 (age 79) Ulverstone, Tasmania
- Party: Liberal Party of Australia
- Education: University of Tasmania; University of South Africa
- Occupation: Teacher

Christopher Gordon Miles (born 21 August 1947) is an Australian former politician. He was a member of the House of Representatives from 1984 to 1998, representing the Tasmanian seat of Braddon. He served as parliamentary secretary to Prime Minister John Howard and was a prominent social conservative within the Liberal Party, chairing the conservative Lyons Forum ginger group. Prior to entering politics, he worked as a schoolteacher.

== Early life ==
Miles was born on 21 August 1947 in Ulverstone, Tasmania. He grew up on the family potato farm. Miles holds the degrees of Bachelor of Education from the University of South Africa and Bachelor of Science from the University of Tasmania, as well as a diploma in teaching from the latter. He taught at government schools in Tasmania, New South Wales, and the ACT, including at Canberra High School for eight years. He returned to Tasmania to help establish a parent-run Christian school near Ulverstone.

== Politics ==
While teaching in Canberra, Miles served as secretary of the Liberal Party of Australia (A.C.T. Division) in 1976. After returning to his home state he served on the Tasmanian division's state executive and as president of the Ulverstone branch.

=== Parliament ===
Miles was elected to parliament at the 1984 federal election, retaining the seat of Braddon for the Liberal Party following the retirement of Ray Groom. He was re-elected on four occasions before being defeated by the Australian Labor Party (ALP) candidate Sid Sidebottom at the 1998 election.

In October 1987, after an unsuccessful leadership spill against John Howard, Miles was elevated to the shadow ministry as Shadow Minister for Aboriginal Affairs. He subsequently joined the council of the Australian Institute of Aboriginal Studies. He lost his place in shadow ministry following a successful spill against Howard by Andrew Peacock.

In May 1994, Miles returned to the shadow ministry under the new opposition leader Alexander Downer, holding the portfolio of Shadow Minister for Schools, Vocational Education and Training. He resigned his position in October 1994 in protest at the opposition's decision to support the government's Human Rights (Sexual Conduct) Bill 1994, which repealed Tasmania's sodomy laws. After the Coalition won the 1996 election, Miles was appointed parliamentary secretary (cabinet) to John Howard as prime minister. He held the position until losing his seat in 1998.

=== Political positions ===
Miles was a leading social conservative within the Liberal Party. In 1992 he was one of a group of Coalition members of parliament who founded the Lyons Forum, a conservative ginger group. He was subsequently elected as the forum's chairman.

In the early 1990s Miles was a leader of the campaign against repealing Tasmania's anti-sodomy laws, organising "Say No To Sodomy" rallies in the state's North West. The Canberra Times wrote in 1994 that he was "avowedly against the practice of anal sex (male or female)". He was also quoted as supporting the teaching of creationism alongside evolution.

== Later activities ==
In 1999, Miles was appointed by the Howard government to a five-year term on the Foreign Investment Review Board, at which point he was the director of corporate development at Pacific Hills Education. He was re-appointed to another five-year term in 2004. At the time of the announcement he was managing director of Gaunts Holdings Australia.

In 2016, during public debate over the legalisation of same-sex marriage, it was reported that Miles planned to distribute "millions of copies of a pamphlet claiming children of same-sex couples may be more likely to be victims of sexual abuse, abuse drugs or suffer depression".

== Personal life ==
Miles had two children with his wife Roslyn. His property Gaunts Farm at Nietta contains a hydroelectric system fed by a creek via a dam and pipeline, which "on average generates about 620kW an hour".

Parliament of Australia
Preceded by Ray Groom	Member for Braddon; 1984–1998	Succeeded by Sid Sidebottom
