= Eric Hutchinson (politician) =

Australian politician

The Honourable Eric Hutchinson

Administrator of Norfolk Island
- In office 1 April 2017 – 31 May 2023
- Monarchs: Elizabeth II; Charles III
- Governors-General: Sir Peter Cosgrove; David Hurley
- Preceded by: Gary Hardgrave
- Succeeded by: George Plant

Member of the Australian Parliament for Lyons
- In office 7 September 2013 – 2 July 2016
- Preceded by: Dick Adams
- Succeeded by: Brian Mitchell

Personal details
- Born: Eric Russell Hutchinson; 19 June 1965 (age 61) Launceston, Tasmania
- Party: Liberal
- Spouse: Amanda
- Children: 2
- Occupation: Business manager
- Website: www.erichutchinson.com.au

Eric Russell Hutchinson (born 19 June 1965) is an Australian politician who served as the administrator of Norfolk Island from 2017 to 2023. He previously served in the Australian House of Representatives from 2013 to 2016, representing the Division of Lyons as a member of the Liberal Party of Australia.

== Early life ==
Eric Hutchinson was born in Launceston, Tasmania, on 19 June 1965. He worked for various wool-exporting companies before entering politics.

== Politics ==
Hutchinson was elected to federal parliament at the 2013 election, when he won the Division of Lyons from incumbent Labor MP Dick Adams. He secured a 1.2-point margin from a swing of 13.5 points. He did not live in his electorate, but in the neighbouring Division of Bass; 11 other members of parliament did not live in their electorates. He was defeated in the 2016 election by Labor candidate Brian Mitchell. After his defeat, he took up a role as an advisor to President of the Senate Stephen Parry.

== Administrator of Norfolk Island ==
On 1 April 2017, Hutchinson began a two-year term as Administrator of Norfolk Island, which was extended by a further two years in February 2019. In March 2020, during the COVID-19 pandemic, he declared a state of emergency on the island and imposed a 32-day travel ban. He was again reappointed for a two-year term beginning on 1 April 2021. On 11 May 2023, it was announced by the Minister for Regional Development, Local Government and Territories that Hutchinson would be succeeded by George Plant as Administrator. Plant was sworn in on 26 May 2023 and began his term as Administrator on 1 June 2023.

Parliament of Australia
Preceded by Dick Adams	Member for Lyons; 2013–2016	Succeeded by Brian Mitchell
Government offices
Preceded by Gary Hardgrave	Administrator of Norfolk Island; 2017–2023	Succeeded by George Plant
