= Mark Baker (Australian politician) =

Australian politician (born 1958)

Member of the Australian Parliament for Braddon
- In office 9 October 2004 – 24 November 2007
- Preceded by: Sid Sidebottom
- Succeeded by: Sid Sidebottom

Personal details
- Born: 31 December 1958 (age 67)
- Party: Liberal Party of Australia
- Occupation: Financial adviser

Mark Horden Baker (born 31 December 1958) is an Australian politician. He was elected as a Liberal Party of Australia member of the Australian House of Representatives in October 2004, for the Division of Braddon, Tasmania. He was educated in Tasmania, and holds various trade and academic qualifications.

In the past, his community involvement has included member of both the Devonport and Launceston Chamber of Commerce; the Motor Neurone Disease Association of Tasmania; he has also been a board member of the Tasmanian Football Club in 2002. In 2002 Mark was elected President of the Road Trauma Support Team Tasmania. He has worked as a carpenter/joiner, a teacher, and most recently, as a financial adviser. He was defeated for reelection in 2007 by Labor's Sid Sidebottom but held the swing against him to just 2% in the face of a nationwide swing to the ALP of 6%.

Parliament of Australia
Preceded by Sid Sidebottom	Member for Braddon; 2004–2007	Succeeded by Sid Sidebottom
