= Harry Quick =

Australian politician (1941–2024)

Member of the Australian Parliament for Franklin
- In office 13 March 1993 – 17 October 2007
- Preceded by: Bruce Goodluck
- Succeeded by: Julie Collins

Personal details
- Born: 28 June 1941 Melbourne, Australia
- Died: 19 October 2024 (aged 83) Adelaide, Australia
- Party: Independent (from 2007); Labor (until 2007)
- Occupation: Teacher, electoral officer

Harry Vernon Quick (28 June 1941 – 19 October 2024) was an Australian politician. He was a member of the House of Representatives from 1993 until 2007, representing the electorate of Franklin in Tasmania. He sat as a member of the Labor Party from 1993 to 2007, when he was expelled from the party for failing to pay his membership dues. An outspoken maverick MP, he did not contest the 2007 federal election.

== Early life ==
He was a teacher, education officer and electorate officer before entering politics. He worked for Senator Michael Tate prior to being elected to the House.

== Politics ==
He first entered politics in 1993 after winning the southern Tasmanian seat of Franklin in the House of Representatives. On the night of the 1993 federal election, Quick was the first member to become elected (mainly due to the daylight saving time difference), reclaiming Franklin for Labor, for the first time in 17 years. During the time he was member for Franklin the one-time Liberal stronghold became a reasonably safe Labor seat. Even in the 2004 federal election where all Tasmanian Labor members lost support, Quick's decline was the smallest.

He also protested against the 2003 Iraq war in which Australian troops took part. He once took some Tasmanian apples into the Federal parliament in protest against legalising the import of New Zealand apples which have been banned in Australia for 80 years because of bio-security risk reasons, notably the Fireblight disease. The Speaker of the New Zealand Parliament was present on an official visit, and Speaker Neil Andrew named Quick for refusing to discard the apples as requested. He opposed the 2005 Walker Corporation planned development at Ralphs Bay near Hobart that the State Labor Government had hoped for. He has always believed that politicians should take a "hands on" role in the community. Quick was an Opposition Whip 2001–04.

On 12 August 2005, Quick announced that he would not contest his seat at the next federal election, blaming what he called the party's left-right factional disputes and lack of a strong leader as the reasons for his retirement. Quick caused controversy during the 2006 state election by endorsing not only fellow Labor candidates in the state equivalent of his seat, but also a Tasmanian Greens member, Nick McKim.

Quick was expelled from the ALP on 20 August 2007 for failing to pay his membership fees, and appearing with Liberal party representatives Vanessa Goodwin the candidate for Franklin and minister Joe Hockey when the preselected ALP candidate for Franklin was Tasmanian union official Kevin Harkins who Quick opposed. Harkins subsequently resigned as candidate after more controversy and Julie Collins was preselected as the candidate instead. He sat as an Independent member until his retirement.

In February 2009, Quick was reported to be seeking preselection for the Tasmanian Legislative Council division of Derwent as a representative of the Tasmanian Greens. He had joined the Greens in July 2008. Five days after announcing his intention to contest the seat held by Treasurer Michael Aird, Quick abruptly changed his mind, citing a desire to spend more time with his family.

Quick was elected in the 2014 general Tasmanian council elections to Glenorchy City Council as alderman and was elected deputy mayor of Glenorchy, but defeated for both positions in 2018. Quick was elected in the 2022 general Tasmanian council elections to Glenorchy City Council as alderman.

== Death ==
Quick died in Adelaide from cancer on 19 October 2024, at the age of 83.

Parliament of Australia
| Preceded by Bruce Goodluck | Member for Franklin; 1993–2007 | Succeeded by Julie Collins |
