= Division of Braddon =

Australian federal electoral division

Coordinates: 41.648°S 145.414°E

Braddon Australian House of Representatives Division
- Interactive map of boundaries since the 2019 federal election
- Created: 1955
- MP: Anne Urquhart
- Party: Labor
- Namesake: Sir Edward Braddon
- Electors: 84,278 (2025)
- Area: 21,369 km^{2} (8,250.6 sq mi)
- Demographic: Rural
- State electorate: Braddon
Electorates around Braddon:
Bass Strait	Bass Strait	Bass Strait
Southern Ocean	Braddon	Bass; Lyons
Southern Ocean	Southern Ocean	Franklin

The Division of Braddon is an Australian electoral division in the state of Tasmania. The current MP is Anne Urquhart of the Labor Party, who was elected at the 2025 federal election.

Braddon is a rural electorate covering approximately 21,369 square kilometres (8,251 sq mi) in the north-west and west of Tasmania, including King Island. The cities of Burnie and Devonport are major population centres in the division. Other towns include Currie, Latrobe, Penguin, Queenstown, Rosebery, Smithton, Somerset, Stanley, Strahan, Ulverstone, Waratah, Wynyard and Zeehan.

Braddon has traditionally been a marginal seat. However, in 2022 the trend was broken, with Braddon becoming a "fairly safe" seat for the first time in twelve years, with the Liberal Party holding it while losing government nationally. In 2025, large swings towards the Labor Party saw Anne Urquhart gain the seat for Labor.

== Geography ==
Since 1984, federal electoral division boundaries in Australia have been determined at redistributions by a redistribution committee appointed by the Australian Electoral Commission. Redistributions occur for the boundaries of divisions in a particular state, and they occur every seven years, or sooner if a state's representation entitlement changes or when divisions of a state are malapportioned.

Since the division was created in 1955, the division only had minor boundary changes during redistributions. Since the 2019 election, the division covers the entire local government areas of Circular Head, Waratah-Wynyard, West Coast, Burnie, Central Coast, Devonport and Latrobe. There were no change to its boundaries in the 2026 redistribution.

== History ==
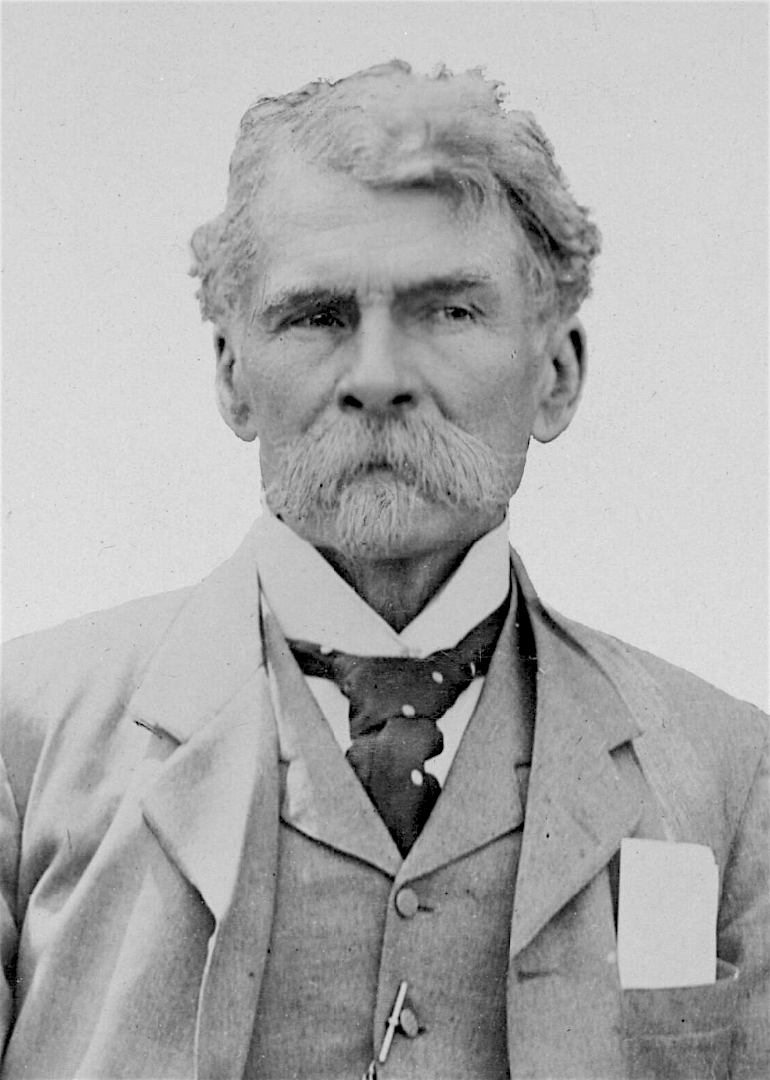
Sir Edward Braddon, the division's namesake

The division was created at the Tasmanian redistribution on 30 August 1955, as a change (in name only) from the Division of Darwin; with no electoral boundaries altered. It is named for Sir Edward Braddon, a Premier of Tasmania and one of Tasmania's five original federal members of parliament.

Following the election of the Whitlam government and the period following the Franklin Dam controversy, Braddon became a relatively safe seat for the Liberal Party. In more recent years, the division has usually been a marginal seat, changing hands between the Australian Labor Party and the Liberal Party. Its most prominent member was Ray Groom. Groom was later to represent Denison in the Tasmanian Parliament 1986–2001 and served as Tasmanian Premier 1992–96.

== Members ==
Image	Member	Party	Term	Notes
	Aubrey Luck (1900–1999)	Liberal	10 December 1955 – 22 November 1958	Previously held the Division of Darwin. Lost seat
	Ron Davies (1919–1980)	Labor	22 November 1958 – 13 December 1975	Lost seat
	Ray Groom (1944–)	Liberal	13 December 1975 – 26 October 1984	Served as minister under Fraser. Retired. Later elected to the Tasmanian House of Assembly seat of Denison in 1986
	Chris Miles (1947–)	Liberal	1 December 1984 – 3 October 1998	Lost seat
	Sid Sidebottom (1951–)	Labor	3 October 1998 – 9 October 2004	Lost seat
	Mark Baker (1958–)	Liberal	9 October 2004 – 24 November 2007	Lost seat
	Sid Sidebottom (1951–)	Labor	24 November 2007 – 7 September 2013	Lost seat
	Brett Whiteley (1960–)	Liberal	7 September 2013 – 2 July 2016	Lost seat
	Justine Keay (1975–)	Labor	2 July 2016 – 10 May 2018	Election results declared void due to dual citizenship. Subsequently re-elected. Lost seat
	Justine Keay (1975–)	Labor	28 July 2018 – 18 May 2019	Election results declared void due to dual citizenship. Subsequently re-elected. Lost seat
	Gavin Pearce (1967–)	Liberal	18 May 2019 – 28 March 2025	Retired. Later elected to the Tasmanian House of Assembly seat of Braddon in 2025
	Anne Urquhart (1957–)	Labor	3 May 2025 – present	Previously a member of the Senate. Incumbent

== Election results ==
2025 Australian federal election: Braddon
Party	Candidate	Votes	%	±%
Labor	Anne Urquhart	29,579	39.52	+17.02
Liberal	Mal Hingston	23,700	31.67	−12.44
Greens	Erin Morrow	6,318	8.44	+1.72
Independent	Adam Martin	6,174	8.25	+8.25
One Nation	Christopher Methorst	5,709	7.63	+3.29
Trumpet of Patriots	Stephen Kenney	3,360	4.49	+4.49
Total formal votes		74,840	95.47	+3.13
Informal votes		3,553	4.53	−3.13
Turnout		78,393	93.05	+0.29
Two-party-preferred result
Labor	Anne Urquhart	42,809	57.20	+15.23
Liberal	Mal Hingston	32,031	42.80	−15.23
Labor gain from Liberal		Swing	+15.23	
