= Sid Sidebottom =

Australian politician (born 1951)

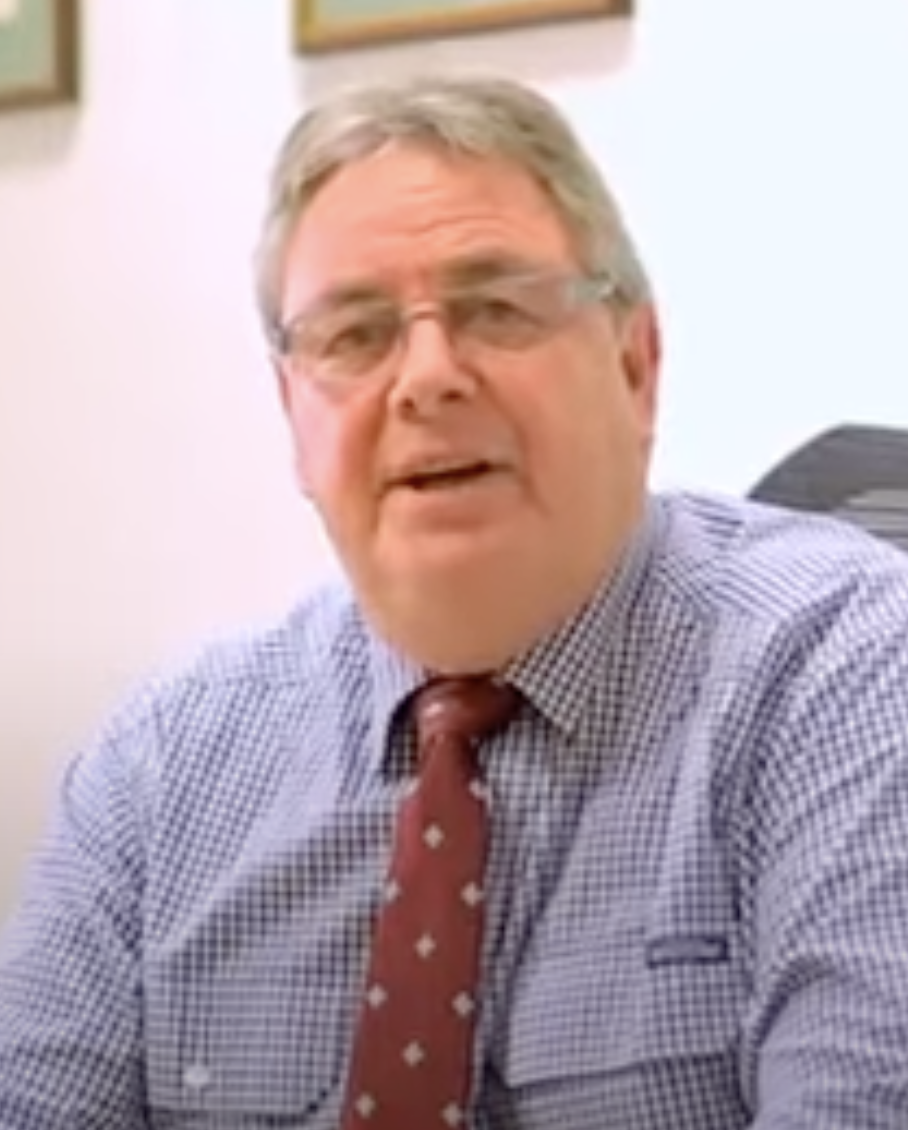

Member of the Australian Parliament for Braddon
- In office 24 November 2007 – 7 September 2013
- Preceded by: Mark Baker
- Succeeded by: Brett Whiteley
- In office 3 October 1998 – 9 October 2004
- Preceded by: Chris Miles
- Succeeded by: Mark Baker

Personal details
- Born: Peter Sid Sidebottom; 23 April 1951 (age 75) Hobart, Tasmania
- Party: Australian Labor Party
- Education: University of Tasmania
- Occupation: Electorate officer
- Profession: Teacher

Peter Sid Sidebottom (born 23 April 1951) is an Australian former politician. Sidebottom was an Australian Labor Party member of the Australian House of Representatives, representing the Division of Braddon in Tasmania between 1998 and 2004 and again from the 2007 federal election until his defeat in 2013. In 2011, Sidebottom was appointed the Parliamentary Secretary for Agriculture, Fisheries and Forestry. He was defeated for a second time at the 2013 election, with a swing of 10% against him.

== Background and early career ==
Sidebottom was born in Hobart, Tasmania. He graduated from the University of Tasmania with a Bachelor of Arts (honours); and was a senior secondary college teacher between 1975 and 1997. During 1998, he was an electorate officer for Senator Nick Sherry and again worked for Sherry as an advisor between 2004 and 2007. Sidebottom was elected as a Councillor of the Central Coast Council, serving between 1996 and 1998.

== Political career ==
At the 1998 federal election, Sidebottom defeated sitting Liberal Member for Braddon, Chris Miles. However, Sidebottom was defeated by the Liberal candidate, Mark Baker, at the 2004 election. Many put this down to concern about loss of forestry jobs under Labor's environment policy, which had the potential to adversely affect Sidebottom's electorate.

Sidebottom subsequently won back the seat at the 2007 federal election, defeating Baker.

On 14 December 2011, Sidebottom was appointed the Parliamentary Secretary for Agriculture, Fisheries and Forestry in the Second Gillard Ministry.

At the 2013 federal election, Sidebottom lost his seat of Braddon for the second time, suffering a 10% swing against him.

Parliament of Australia
Preceded by Chris Miles	Member for Braddon; 1998–2004	Succeeded by Mark Baker
Preceded by Mark Baker	Member for Braddon; 2007–2013	Succeeded by Brett Whiteley
