= Dick Adams (Australian politician) =

Australian politician (born 1951)

The Honourable Dick Adams OAM
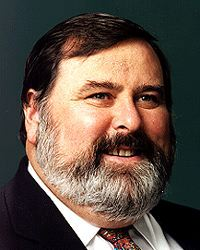

Member of the Australian Parliament for Lyons
- In office 13 March 1993 – 7 September 2013
- Preceded by: Max Burr
- Succeeded by: Eric Hutchinson

Minister for National Parks, Lands, Aged Persons and Community Welfare of Tasmania
- In office 11 November 1981 – 26 May 1982
- Premier: Harry Holgate

Member of the Tasmanian Parliament for Franklin
- In office 28 July 1979 – 15 May 1982 Serving with Eric Barnard; Geoff Pearsall; John Beattie; Michael Aird; Thomas Cleary; Doug Lowe; Bill McKinnon

Personal details
- Born: 29 April 1951 (age 74) Launceston, Tasmania
- Party: Labor Party
- Occupation: Politician

Dick Godfrey Harry Adams OAM (born 29 April 1951) is a former Australian politician who served as a Labor Party member of the Australian House of Representatives. He represented the Division of Lyons in central Tasmania from the 1993 federal election until the 2013 federal election. He was born in Launceston, Tasmania, and was a meat worker, rural worker and an organiser with the Australasian Meat Industry Employees' Union and the Liquor and Hospitality and Miscellaneous Workers' Union (Miscellaneous Division) before entering politics. He is currently serving as a councillor on Northern Midlands Council

Adams was a member of the Tasmanian House of Assembly for the Franklin division from the 1979 state election until the 1982 state election, serving as Deputy Speaker and Chairman of Committees from 1980 until 1981, and as Minister for National Parks, Lands, Aged Persons and Community Welfare from 1981 until 1982.

Since being elected to the federal parliament, Adams played an active role in the conduct of Parliamentary affairs. He was a member of the Speakers' Panel from 1996 to 2013. He also participated in a number of Parliamentary Standing Committees, including the Parliamentary Library joint committee which he served as a member and chair from 2006. From 2007 he was the chairman of the Primary Industries and Resources Standing Committee and the National Capital and External Territories Standing Committee, and was an inaugural member of the Standing Committee on Petitions which was established to receive and process petitions to the Federal Parliament from citizens and groups. Adams was also on the Joint Committee for Public Accounts & Audit, Standing Committee of Agriculture, Resources, Fisheries, and Forestry, and Joint Standing Committee for Foreign Affairs, Defence & Trade and all relevant sub committees—Adams was the only member of parliament to sit on all of the Foreign Affairs, Defence & Trade committees.

Adams was narrowly defeated by Liberal candidate Eric Hutchinson at the 2013 election suffering a 13.5 percent two-party swing, the largest in the nation.

Adams was a National Ambassador of the National Year of Reading for 2012.

In 2019, Dick Adams was awarded the Medal of the Order of Australia for service to Australian and Tasmanian Parliaments, and to adult literacy.

Parliament of Australia
Preceded by Max Burr	Member for Lyons; 1993–2013	Succeeded by Eric Hutchinson
