= 2001 Queen's Birthday Honours (Australia) =

The 2001 Queen's Birthday Honours for Australia were announced on Monday 11 June 2001 by the office of the Governor-General.

The Birthday Honours were appointments by some of the 16 Commonwealth realms of Queen Elizabeth II to various orders and honours to reward and highlight good works by citizens of those countries. The Birthday Honours are awarded as part of the Queen's Official Birthday celebrations during the month of June.

== Order of Australia ==
=== Companion (AC) ===
==== General Division ====
Recipient	Citation	Notes
Charles Barrington Goode	For service to business, particularly through major achievements in the area of finance, for guidance in his position on the Boards of charitable and health-related organisations, and for outstanding direction of philanthropic policy in the community.	
Professor James May	For service to the advancement of vascular surgery throughout the world, particularly through pioneering the introduction of endoluminal methods for the treatment of diseased arteries, placing Australia in the forefront internationally in this field.	
Commissioner James Patrick O'Sullivan APM	For service to law enforcement and commitment to excellence in reshaping and introducing wide-ranging reforms in the Queensland Police Service.	
Professor Hugh Ringland Taylor	For service to medicine in the field of ophthalmology, particularly through renowned work in the prevention of river blindness in the third world, to academia through research and education related to the prevention of eye disease, and to the development of policy on eye health in indigenous communities.	
Professor Judith Ann Whitworth	For service to the advancement of academic medicine and as a major contributor to research policy and medical research administration in Australia and internationally.	
Peter John Wills, AM	For service to social and economic advancement through the development of public policy in relation to funding for biomedical research and evolving biotechnology industries.	
The Honourable Sir (Albert) Edward Woodward, OBE, QC	For contributions to Australian public life, particularly in the areas of public administration, social justice, cultural diversity, education and advocacy for people with mental illness.	
Dr John Samuel Yu, AM	For service to the provision and development of 'state of the art' paediatric care and research, to children's rights, to education, and to the decorative and visual arts.	

=== Officer (AO) ===
==== General Division ====
Recipient	Citation	Notes
David Zalmon Baffsky	For service to tourism, particularly in relation to industry development, service provision and employment generation, and to the community through medical research, humanitarian relief and social welfare organisations.	
Professor Maxwell Richard Bennett	For service to the biological sciences, particularly in the field of neuroscience and as a major contributor to the establishment of organisations aimed at furthering interdisciplinary research in this field, and to education.	
The Honourable James Joseph Carlton	For service to the community, particularly through the Australian Red Cross in the areas of international humanitarian relief, international law, peace and disarmament, and to the Australian Parliament.	
Robert Lindsay (Bob) Charley	For service to the Australian thoroughbred horse racing industry, particularly through industry regulatory and administrative authorities, and to the community through support for social welfare, health and sporting groups.	
Sister (Dr) Patricia Margaret Coyle	For service to the community, particularly humanitarian aid overseas, as a medical practitioner in the field of anaesthesia, and through the Catholic Church.	
Lionel Moyle Davies BEM	For service to the community, particularly through Lions International and St John Ambulance, to international relations through the provision of technical expertise, training and specialist advice in Indonesia and Tuvalu, and to the medical profession as a designer and developer of specialised precision medical instruments.	
Professor Donald Stephen Esmore	For service in the field of cardiothoracic surgery, particularly heart and lung transplant procedures, and for research into the development of artificial heart technology.	
Dr Allan Herbert Miller Fels	For service to Australian competition policy through the development and regulation of trade practices and consumer protection, and to public education in relation to consumer law and its implications for business and commerce.	
Carrillo Baillieu Gantner	For service to the performing arts as a promoter of Australian theatre and playwrights nationally and internationally, to arts administration, and to fostering cultural exchanges between Australia and Asia.	
Kathryn Greiner	For service to social welfare, particularly in the area of family support and the development of strategies to prevent child abuse, to charity through raising awareness of the need for funding to permit expansion and delivery of services, and to local government in Sydney.	
Hazel Hawke	For service to the community, particularly through the promotion of the reconciliation process, support for continued improvement in the quality of children's television, as a contributor to the preservation of heritage items, and involvement with environmental and wildlife preservation groups.	
Henry William Howe	For service to the development and promotion of the credit union movement within Australia and internationally, and through the establishment and introduction of regional development education programmes to facilitate the operations of credit unions, particularly in Pacific and Asian areas.	
Professor Keith Leslie Hughes	For service to veterinary science, particularly in the areas of research and education, as a promoter of the use of new medical technology for the benefit of animal health, and as a leading contributor in the areas of public health, foodborne diseases and zoonoses.	
Beryl Ingold, MBE	For service to the rural community in the areas of regional development and education, particularly recognition of the importance of management training in the agribusiness sector, the development of agricultural industries, and to the welfare of rural women.	
Moira Kelly	For service to the Australian community through the provision of social support and services for disadvantaged people, and to the international community through the provision of humanitarian relief and assistance and the organisation of medical treatment for those affected by war or insurrection.	
Professor Ian Lowe	For service to science and technology, particularly in the area of environmental studies, to education and research, and as a contributor to public debate on environmental issues.	
Reginald Valwynne Lowry	For service to the community, particularly through youth, health and international service groups, sporting and church organisations, and as a member of a range of government boards and authorities.	
Jeffrey Mahemoff	For service to education, particularly through the development of Bialik College as a progressive educational institution widely recognised for excellence in all spheres, and to the wider community.	
Professor John Stanley Mattick	For service to scientific research in the fields of molecular biology, genetics and biotechnology, particularly through the development and administration of research institutes and the Australian Genome Research Facility.	
Hilary Jane McPhee	For service to the arts, particularly as a promoter of Australian writers and as a literary publisher, and to arts administration through the Australia Council.	
Dr Lloyd George O'Brien	For service to the dental profession, particularly in the areas of professional development, training and education, and to the community through the establishment of dental care programmes for disadvantaged groups in society.	
Dr John Augustine O'Loughlin	For service to medicine in the field of obstetrics and gynaecology through clinical practice, research, and education, and to the identification and development of key areas of the profession to improve women's health.	
Elizabeth Anne Reid	For service to international relations, particularly through the United Nations Development Programme, to the welfare of women, and to HIV/AIDS policy development, both in Australia and internationally.	
Anthony Dalton (Tony) Roche, MBE	For service to tennis in Australia and internationally as a player and coach, and to the community, particularly through fundraising activities for the Starlight Children's Foundation.	
Dr Anthony James Shinkfield, AM	For service to educational administration, particularly through the Anglican Schools Commission, to education evaluation, primarily at an international level, and to the community through the Veterans' Children Education Board and St Mark's College.	
Jeffrey Edson Smart	For service to the visual arts, particularly through his distinctive portrayal of the urban landscape, and through the encouragement offered to young artists.	
Peter William Thomson, CBE	For service to golf as a player and administrator, and to the community.	
(Donald) Henry von Bibra	For service to the cultural life of Victoria, particularly through the Victorian College of the Arts, to the law as a contributor to developments in the area of mediation, and to the community.	
Nicholas Xynias, OAM, BEM	For service to the community, particularly as a leader in the areas of multiculturalism, migrant welfare, reconciliation and aged care.	
Professor Dianne Yerbury, AM	For service to tertiary education, particularly in developing the broader cultural and international mission of Australian universities and leading Macquarie University into significant new fields of scientific and social research, to the arts and to the community.	
Professor Paul Zev Zimmet, AM	For service to medical research of national and international significance, particularly in the field of diabetes, as a leader of investigations into social, nutritional and lifestyle diseases, and to biotechnology development in Australia.	

=== Member (AM) ===
==== General Division ====
Recipient	Citation	Notes
Beverlee Jill Louisa Adams	For service to local government through the Scone Shire Council, to support for rural women, to sustainable agriculture and to environmental management.	
John Allison	For service to the community, particularly through the performing arts, education and medical research, and to the insurance and reinsurance industries.	
Maxwell James Atkins	For service to local government, particularly as Mayor of the City of Shoalhaven, and to the community.	
John Hewson Barber	For service to the beef cattle industry, particularly in the areas of development, research, promotion and breeding in the northern New South Wales coastal region, and to the community.	
Anthony Robert Bates	For service to the development and improvement of business enterprise within Australia, particularly in the areas of biotechnology and health industry knowledge, and to the promotion of training and education opportunities for young Australians.	
Professor Edward Henry Bates	For service to medicine, particularly in the field of paediatric orthopaedics, as a clinician, teacher and administrator.	
Sandra Christine Bates	For service to the performing arts, particularly as Artistic Director of the Ensemble Theatre.	
Valerie Jane Beddoe	For service to diving as a competitor, coach and administrator.	
Associate Professor Michael Besser	For service to medicine, particularly in the field of neurosurgery, as a clinician, teacher and administrator.	
Dr Gytha Wade Betheras	For service to medicine in the field of obstetrics and gynaecology, and to women's health issues, particularly in the areas of family planning and sexual health.	
Professor Pierre Joseph Victor Beumont	For service to medicine, particularly psychiatry in the areas of anorexia nervosa and other eating disorders, and as a clinician, researcher and administrator.	
Gavin James Bird	For service to the community through organisations promoting awareness of schizophrenia, conducting research, and providing support for people with mental illnesses and their carers.	
James W. Black	For service to the promotion of Australian-American relations, particularly through the American Australian Association, the American Australian Studies Foundation and the Australian New Zealand American Chamber of Commerce.	
Wolfgang Franz Otto Blass	For service to the development of the Australian wine industry, particularly as an export industry, and to the promotion of excellence in winemaking, viticulture, marketing and research.	
Dr Michael Dean Bollen	For service to medicine in the field of general practice and to the development of improved methods of health care delivery.	
Adrian Hugh Brien	For service to business development within the retail automotive industry, and to the community through support for medical research, sporting and charitable organisations.	
Christina Rose Brock	For service to the community through the establishment and development of CanYA, a cancer support service for young adult cancer patients, their families and health workers.	
David Bussau	For service to international development assistance, particularly as founder of Opportunity International, Australia.	
Barry Arthur Carbon	For service to environmental protection and management, particularly through policy development and the encouragement of industry self-improvement.	
Myolene Anne Carrick	For service to the community, particularly in the areas of women's rights, raising awareness of domestic violence, establishing child care centres and through support for victims of sexual abuse.	
Marjorie Chelsea Carss	For service to education, particularly in the field of mathematics, and to the development and promotion of women in the education profession.	
Professor Bruce James Chapman	For service to the development of Australian economic, labour market and social policy.	
Kenneth Donald Charlton	For service to architectural heritage conservation, particularly in the Australian Capital Territory, and to the community.	
Ian Arthur Chesterman	For service to the community of South Australia, particularly as a supporter of cultural, educational and social welfare organisations.	
John David Claringbould	For service to the food processing industry through food science and industry bodies, to the environment through Landcare Australia, and to the community through the Committee for Melbourne.	
Dr Ronald Philip Cleary	For service to medicine as a general practitioner, and to the community of Robinvale.	
Anthony Patrick Clune	For service to the promotion of the visual arts in New South Wales through the Sir William Dobell Art Foundation, and to the community.	
Emeritus Professor David Elwyn Davies	For service to education, particularly in the area of the higher education private provider accreditation process in Victoria, and to the community.	
Dr Richard Edward Davis	For service to medical research and education, particularly in the fields of haematology and malaria.	
Dr Elizabeth Mara Dax	For service to medical research, particularly in the fields of public health, HIV/AIDS, and drug addiction.	
Dianne Sylvia Decker	For service to the community of the Lachlan Valley, particularly through preservation of and education about Aboriginal heritage, to people with disabilities, and to local government through the Forbes Shire Council.	
Brigadier John Pericles Arthur Deighton, MC	For service to veterans, particularly through commemorative, welfare, administrative and educational programmes of the Victorian Branch of the Returned and Services League of Australia.	
Clive Deverall	For service to community health, particularly through the promotion of cancer awareness programmes and support services of the Cancer Foundation of Western Australia.	
James Stanley Dunn	For service to humanity as an advocate for the rights of the East Timorese.	
Edith Dorothy Kate Eadie	For service to the nursing profession, particularly in preserving and recording the stories of Australian Army nurses who served during World War II.	
Dr Penelope Christine Egan-Vine	For service to the community of the Albury/Wodonga region, particularly through the development and expansion of support services and counselling groups for people in crisis.	
Dagmar Egen	For service to education, information technology, multicultural affairs and state development in South Australia.	
Gwendoline Margaret Elliot	For service to the horticulture of native plants, particularly through the Society for Growing Australian Plants.	
Winston Rodger Elliot	For service to the horticulture of native plants, particularly through the Society for Growing Australian Plants.	
Bridget Anne Faye	For service to women's affairs, particularly through the National Council of Women, and to the community.	
Dr Kevin John Fewster	For service to museum administration, and the preservation of maritime history.	
Professor John Kerr Findlay	For service to medicine as a researcher, particularly in the field of reproductive biology, and as a medical administrator.	
Dr William Brian Fleming	For service to medicine, particularly oncology treatment as a head and neck surgeon, and as a medical administrator.	
Charles Leo Fogliani	For service to education, particularly in the advancement of chemistry education.	
Dale Fotheringham	For service to the community, particularly through Y's Men International and the Young Men’s Christian Association, and the groups' international partnership programmes providing development assistance.	
James Geltch	For service to primary industry, particularly in the field of irrigated agriculture, and to the promotion of agricultural research and education.	
Thomas Morland Glazebrook, RFD, ED	For service to the community, particularly through the Bendigo Chapter of Habitat for Humanity, and to the engineering profession.	
Chester Allan Greenway	For service to tourism in Australia, as a pioneer in the development of accommodation standards, and to the promotion of Australian-American relations through the Australian-American Chamber of Commerce.	
Janine Haines	For service to the Australian Parliament and to politics, particularly as Parliamentary Leader of the Australian Democrats, and to the community.	
Douglas Grant Hall	For service to arts administration, particularly as Director of the Queensland Art Gallery, and to the promotion of the art of the Asia-Pacific region.	
Marjorie Joyce Hawkes	For service to the community through a broad range of health, emergency service, social welfare, education and veteran groups, and to local government through the Orange City Council.	
Ross Arthur Heinze	For service to the wine industry, particularly in the area of vine improvement and as a contributor to the development of Australian vine industry standards, and to the community.	
Israel (Izzy) Herzog	For service to the community, particularly the Jewish community in Victoria, through the provision of funds for education and support for fledgling business enterprises and the Australia-Israel Chamber of Commerce.	
Dr David John Hill	For service to the promotion of community health, particularly in the development of cancer awareness and prevention programmes.	
Bruce A. Hogan	For service to business and commerce in the fields of investment banking and finance, and to the community through support and advice for the commercial development of Australian biotechnology research.	
Margaret Joan Holmes	For service to the community through organisations promoting peace, human rights and conflict resolution, particularly as a member of the Women's International League for Peace and Freedom.	
Leslie Roy Hoult	For service to the food processing industry, to international food relief through the development of a high protein biscuit, and to the community through service and educational groups.	
Jacqueline Gail Huggins	For service to the indigenous community, particularly in the areas of reconciliation, social justice, literacy and women's issues.	
Professor William Derek Humpage	For service to electrical engineering, particularly research and education in the areas of the environmental effects of electricity generation and evaluation of renewable energy systems.	
Peter Clifton James	For service to heritage conservation, particularly in the drafting and development of Australian heritage legislation and through the provision of advice to government concerning heritage and conservation practice.	
Dr Peter Callel James Joseph	For service to medicine, particularly through the Royal Australian College of General Practitioners.	
Terry Dale Kelly	For service to the development of export market opportunities through support for Australian Small and Medium Enterprises in the international science and technology sector.	
Richard Glyn Kimber	For service to the community through research projects and the recording of information of national interest in the areas of history, anthropology, Aboriginal art, ecology and land management practices in Central Australia.	
Alison Joan Kinsman	For service to the development of the physiotherapy profession and rehabilitation services, to the education and training of physiotherapists, and to the community through the provision of services for people with disabilities and the Uniting Church in Australia.	
Michael Francis Lynch	For service to arts administration, particularly through implementing transparent and effective processes for grants funding, and as an advocate for Australian cultural life.	
Kenneth Borge Marslew	For service to the community as the founder of the Enough is Enough Anti-Violence Movement, and by raising awareness of issues relating to the prevention of crime and anti-social behaviour.	
Dr Frank Joseph Martin	For service to medicine, particularly in the field of ophthalmology, as a clinician, teacher and administrator.	
Glenys Eileen McDonald	For service to sport and recreation, particularly through the development of AUSSI Masters Swimming at state, national and international levels, and to the community.	
Dr Geoffrey Lionel Metz	For service to medicine as a consultant physician, to the development of medical services, medical education and training facilities, and through medical administration and healthcare delivery.	
Richard Mathieson Morgan	For service to the community, particularly through leadership of and contribution to the Australian Red Cross at the Victorian and National level, and for participation in other community and school-based organisations.	
Gerald Edward Moriarty	For service to the information technology and telecommunications sectors and as an advocate for the employment of leading-edge technological capability to advance Australia's competitiveness in business and commerce.	
Professor Alan Ridley Morton	For service to the development of sports science in Australia, particularly the effects of physical training on the cardiovascular system.	
Leon Mow	For service to the community through financial and administrative support for health research institutes, particularly the International Diabetes Institute, and social welfare and educational organisations.	
Elizabeth Anne Murray, OAM	For service to the community, particularly children, through Kidsafe Australia and raising public awareness of safety issues affecting children.	
The Reverend Dr Christopher James Newell	For service to people with disabilities, particularly through advocacy and research, to the development and practice of ethics and to health consumers.	
Dr Peter Nicoll, RFD, ED	For service to medical administration, to health service provision, and to the community.	
Anne O'Byrne	For service to the community, particularly in the areas of issues affecting women and health administration.	
Graham Charles Paton	For service to the accounting profession, particularly through research into professional standards, and to children with hearing disabilities through the Shepherd Centre.	
Malcolm Frank Peacock	For service to the egg industry, to the community through health, education and social welfare groups, and to local government.	
Florence Valmai Miller Pidgeon	For service to the arts in Queensland as a patron and benefactor, to women, particularly in the area of industrial democracy in the workplace, and to the community.	
Christopher John Guelph Puplick	For service to the protection of human rights and access to social justice in Australia, and to community health through advocacy and support in the area of HIV/AIDS.	
Dr John Clive Radcliffe, OAM	For service to agricultural science policy and land and resource management through the dissemination of scientific knowledge in support of sustainable development, biosafety, and the conservation of agricultural biodiversity.	
Father Mark Raper	For service to international humanitarian relief through the Jesuit Refugee Service.	
Steven Rich	For service to the book publishing and travel industries, to export industry development in Papua New Guinea, and to the community, particularly through the Salvation Army.	
Dr Edward James Ross (Jim) Rossiter	For service to the community, particularly youth through the identification and provision of services to meet their needs, and to paediatrics.	
Emeritus Professor Frank Ferdinand Roxborough	For service to the development of innovative mining engineering techniques, and to education and research in the field.	
Professor Richard Alan Russell	For service to science education in the field of chemistry, particularly through the Australian and International Chemistry Olympiads.	
Valerie Muriel Sarah	For service to women, particularly through Zonta International, and to the community through a range of cultural, social welfare and youth groups.	
Dr Peter Oliver Sheridan	For service to the community, particularly people with Multiple Sclerosis, their families and carers through the development of enhanced access to information resources.	
George Luntz Steele MM	For service to the real estate and financial services industries of Victoria, and to veterans, particularly through activities to commemorate the involvement of Australian troops in the battles for El Alamein.	
Reverend Canon Dr John Gladstone Steele	For service to the community through the recording of the history of South East Queensland, fostering and enhancing the community spirit of all groups on North Stradbroke Island, and through the Anglican Church.	
Bryant Allan Rigbye Stokes, RFD	For service to medicine, particularly in the field of neurosurgery, to the development and improvement of health care standards in Australia, and to medical administration.	
Helen Gray Storer	For service to the aged, particularly through a range of organisations aimed at increasing awareness of the rights of older Australians, improving standards of care, and implementing programmes and policies addressing the issues and concerns of women.	
Denise Carole Thomas	For service to secondary education as Principal of Meriden School, through the Association of Heads of Independent Schools in Australia, and in the area of professional development.	
Penelope Mary Thwaites	For service to music through the performance and promotion of Australian compositions in the United Kingdom and internationally.	
Noelle Claire Tolley	For service to women in business, particularly as National President of Women Chiefs of Enterprise International, and to the community.	
John Francis Treloar	For service to athletics as a competitor and administrator, and to the Olympic movement.	
Peter John Treseder, OAM	For service to the community as a fundraiser for charity, and as a motivational speaker.	
Ananias Tsinoglou	For service to local government through the Launceston City Council, to the Greek community and to charitable organisations.	
Dr Anthony James Vigano	For service to veterinary science, to professional development, and to the community through the promotion of responsible pet ownership.	
Helen Phyllis Warmingham	For service to the community, particularly youth through the Guiding movement and the Girls Friendly Society, and to people with disabilities.	
Margaret Mary Waters	For service to veterans and their families in South Australia, particularly through activities aimed at raising the standard of care for aged veterans.	

==== Military Division ====
Branch	Recipient	Citation	Notes
Navy	Commodore Mervyn Richard Davis, RAN	For exceptional service to the Royal Australian Navy in the fields of project management and capability management.	
Navy	Commodore Trevor Barmby Ruting, CSC, RAN	For exceptional service to the Royal Australian Navy as Offshore Patrol Boat Project Director, as Director General Surface Warfare systems, and as Commodore Logistics - Navy.	
Navy	Rear Admiral Kevin John Scarce, CSC, RAN	For exceptional service to the Royal Australian Navy as Commander Training Command - Navy, and as Support Commander - Navy.	
Navy	Commander John Anthony Worstencroft, RAN	For exceptional service to the Royal Australian Navy in the field of marine engineering and maintenance support of the Royal Australian Navy fleet.	
Army	Colonel Gregory Robert Baker	For exceptional service to the Australian Defence Force as the Commander Australian Contingent, United Nations Transitional Administration East Timor.	
Army	Brigadier Malcolm John Cochrane	For exceptional service to the Australian Army as Commander 2nd Division Artillery, as Commander 5th Brigade, and as Commander Regional Training Centre (New South Wales).	
Army	Colonel William Jeffrey Bromfield Davie	For exceptional service to the Australian Defence Force as the Commander of the Force Logistics Support Group.	
Army	Colonel Craig Ivor Evans	For exceptional service to the Australian Army as the Staff Officer Grade One Operations, Headquarters Aviation Support Group, and as Commanding Officer 1st Aviation Regiment.	
Army	Lieutenant Colonel Garry Edward Heald	For exceptional service as the Director of Reserves – Army, and as Brigade Major 4th Brigade.	
Army	Brigadier Richard Paul Irving, RFD	For exceptional service to the Australian Army in the fields of training, personnel and operations.	
Army	Colonel Michael Gerard Lovell	For exceptional service to the Australian Army as the leader of the Army's Officer Professional Effectiveness Review, and as the Director of Strategy and International Engagement – Army.	
Air Force	Group Captain Ian Geoffrey Jamieson	For exceptional service to the Australian Defence Force in the field of movements management.	
Air Force	Group Captain Roy Douglas Ross McPhail	For exceptional service to the Royal Australian Air Force in the fields of engineering and project management, and as the Commanding Officer of Number 1 Recruit Training Unit.	
Air Force	Group Captain Clive Edward Rossiter	For exceptional service to the Royal Australian Air Force as the Director of the Tactical Fighter Systems Project Office.	
Air Force	Wing Commander Colin Barry Thorne	For exceptional service to the Royal Australian Air Force as the Engineering Manager for the Airborne Early Warning and Control Project.	

=== Medal (OAM) ===
==== General Division ====
Recipient	Citation	Notes
John Alexander Aird	For service to people with disabilities, particularly the provision of social activities, workshops and accommodation services through Newcastle's Own Physically Handicapped Association and Mattara Lodge Inc.	
Raymond Aitchison	For service to the community, particularly the apparel industry.	
Arthur Newman (Robin) Allen	For service to veterans and their families, particularly through the Ulverstone Sub-Branch of the Returned and Services League of Australia, and to the community.	
Brian Sydney Allen	For service to the tourism and hospitality industries, particularly through the Hotel, Motel and Accommodation Association of Australia, and to industry training.	
David Stuart Anderson	For service to local government through the Murray Shire Council, and to the community through a range of environmental, rural, emergency service and health organisations.	
Donald Anderson	For service to the community through the promotion of jazz and the administration of music organisations in Victoria.	
Robert Anderson	For service to the indigenous community of Queensland, particularly through activities relating to youth welfare, social justice, reconciliation, native land title and the preservation of cultural identity.	
Lars Andersson	For service to the community, particularly through the establishment of the Mt Maria Community Sports Club.	
Dr Robert John Andrews, MBE	For service to education in Queensland, particularly for people with special educational needs and their families.	
Carleen Angel	For service to the community through the provision of support services for members of the Australian Defence Force.	
Anne Annear	For service to the indigenous community of Western Australia, particularly as an advocate for improved services in the areas of housing, health and education.	
Anonymous	For service to the community of the Illawarra region, particularly as a supporter of swimming, church and charitable groups.	
Anonymous	For service to the community of the Narracan region, particularly through social welfare, sporting and service groups.	
Anonymous	For service to the preservation and documentation of Australia's naval history and maritime heritage.	
Dr David Hungerford Ashton	For service to the science of plant ecology, particularly in the areas of forest regeneration, conservation and management.	
Athol Bruce Attwater	For service to the community of Pascoe Vale, particularly through sporting organisations and local government.	
Robert John Ayton	For service to people with disabilities.	
Clarence Charles (Mick) Bailey	For service to the welfare of veterans and their families through the 2/8th Australian Field Regiment Association.	
Allan William Baker	For service to the visual arts as an artist, educator and curator, and to the development of public art galleries.	
Herbert Banes	For service to country music as a performer, teacher and administrator.	
Judith Ann Barr	For service to youth, particularly through the Youth Insearch programme.	
The Reverend Canon Kenneth Sydney Barrett	For service to the community of Mandurah, and to the Anglican Church.	
Kevin John Barry	For service to the community, particularly children, through the Variety Club of New South Wales.	
Lesley Helene Bartlett	For service to the community, particularly through issues affecting women and support for employment creation initiatives.	
Bruce William Bates	For service to veterans through the Ulverstone Sub-Branch of the Returned and Services League of Australia, and to the community.	
Kevin William Beare	For service to netball, particularly through the South Australian United Church Netball Association.	
Alexander Bell	For service to the community through a range of veterans', social welfare, youth and service groups.	
Brother Edward Bennett	For service to religion and to the community of the Northern Territory through the Catholic Church, particularly the communities of Melville Island and Alice Springs.	
Steven Paul Bennett	For service to the community through the Employers Making a Difference programme that encourages businesses to employ people with disabilities.	
Kevin Leonard Benson	For service to the community of Darwin through church, service, youth and welfare groups.	
Noel Walter Laurence Bergin	For service to cricket, particularly as an administrator.	
Bradley William Beven	For service to triathlon, particularly as a competitor and promoter of the sport.	
Robert John Binny	For service to youth, particularly through the Sheffield Cattle Handlers Group and the Junior Handlers Show of Tasmania.	
Barbara Scott Blackie	For service to the community, particularly through the Onward Stroke Club.	
Norman John Bloomfield	For service to the community of Molong through a range of service, agricultural society, sporting and civic clubs and organisations.	
Dr George Francis Bornemissza	For service to science and entomology, particularly through the ecological study of dung beetles and the introduction of new species to Australia.	
Clem Ronald Boughen	For service to youth through the Scouting and Guiding movements, and to the community of Roma.	
Ross Griffith Bowden	For service to the community, particularly people with impaired vision, through the development and teaching of braille.	
Arnold Ray Branson	For service to veterans and their families through Legacy Australia.	
Dorothy Eileen Broughton	For service to the community of Hobart, particularly through the Royal Hobart Hospital Auxiliary.	
Bruce Edward Brown	For service to the community of Hawkesbury through veterans', social welfare, sporting and service groups.	
Lionel Hubert Brown	For service to the community, particularly through the Campsie Rotary Club.	
Terry Brown	For service to the community, particularly through the Fitzroy Crossing Unit of the State Emergency Service, and to local government.	
Donald Perce Bubner	For service to the community, particularly though the Adelaide Plains Male Voice Choir.	
Colin Noel Bull	For service to the community, particularly through the Ivanhoe Uniting Church and the Austin Repatriation Medical Centre.	
Noel Charles Burns	For service to the community of Caloundra through financial and direct assistance to a range of sporting, artistic, service and social support activities.	
Horace John (Jack) Byham	For service to the community through raising awareness of Aboriginal culture, and to tourism in the Cobram area.	
Peter Caligari	For service to the commercial radio industry, particularly regional radio, and to the community of Ballarat through fundraising for charitable organisations and community celebrations.	
John Daniel Cameron	For service to cricket as a scorer, statistician and commentator, and to the community.	
Margaret Vivian Campi	For service to the community as an advocate for adoption reform, and through providing support for and assistance to people tracing their birth families.	
John Morton Capp	For service to community and regional development in East Gippsland.	
Jack Capper	For service to the community through fundraising for Cystic Fibrosis Queensland.	
John William Carey	For service to the community, particularly the welfare of veterans and their families and the indigenous people of East Timor through the 2/2nd Commando Association.	
Dr Rodney Frederick Carter, RFD	For service to the community through the promotion of health services, and to the Australian Army.	
Brian George Catchpole	For service to people with disabilities through Technical Aid to the Disabled, Victoria.	
George Yok-Choy Chin	For service to the community through the development of national standards and training programmes for the security industry and through Crime Stoppers.	
Betty Mary Clarke	For service to the community, particularly through fundraising.	
Mary Patricia Clarke	For service to the promotion of Australian history through research and writing, to the study of Australian women writers of the 19th Century, and to the Canberra and District Historical Society.	
Ross Gerry Coco	For service to the community as a fundraiser for hospitals and the Queensland Cancer Fund.	
George Henry Colbran	For service to the community of Townsville through support for social welfare, health, sporting and charitable organisations.	
Kevin Irwin Cole	For service to the farming sector, particularly in the areas of drought relief and land protection, and to the community of Tathra through a range of urban planning, tourism recreation and sporting groups.	
Grahame William Colley	For service to the sugar industry, to land care and catchment management in the Maroochy Shire, and to the community.	
Paul John Commelli	For service to the community as an advocate for people with disabilities, for the frail aged, and for their carers.	
Dr Alan James Cooper	For service to medicine within the specialty of dermatology.	
Geoffrey Glen Cooper	For service to the community, particularly youth, through Camp Clayton and Christian camping programmes that teach outdoor education and leadership skills.	
Valerie Edith Cooper	For service to the community through the Blacktown Community Aid and Information Service and Wanbinga Youth Accommodation Services.	
Bruce Harold Crawford	For service to the community, particularly through Rotary International and Nathanael House, and to the law.	
Bryce Fairman Crawford	For service to primary industry through irrigation and grain storage projects, and to the community.	
Audrey Claire Crommelin	For service to children with hearing disabilities through the establishment of the Speech and Hearing Centre for Children (WA) Inc at Glendalough.	
Terrence William Crommelin	For service to children with hearing disabilities through the establishment of the Speech and Hearing Centre for Children (WA) Inc at Glendalough.	
Richard Jack Crossing	For service to the community of Bathurst through Rotary International, Freemasonry and the State Emergency Service, and to the families of veterans.	
Janice Jean Crosswhite	For service to sport, particularly the development and promotion of women's sport, and to the community.	
Michael Reginald Crozier	For service to the community through school-based organisations in the Australian Capital Territory, the Scouting movement, sporting clubs and the Tuggeranong Community Festival.	
Sister Rosemary Crumlin	For service to the visual arts, particularly the promotion and understanding of contemporary and religious art, to education, and to the community.	
John Laing Culbert	For service to veterans through the 451 RAAF Squadron Association, and as a contributor to the recording of the photographic history of the Middle East, North Africa and Italy during World War II.	
Stanley Cutting	For service to veterans through the Whyalla Section of the Naval Association of South Australia, and to the community.	
Mary Esme Davidson	For service to the community, particularly through the Green Valley Young People's Choir.	
Alfred Davies	For service to ballroom dancing.	
Julie Davies	For service to ballroom dancing.	
Audrey Valda Dearden	For service to the community of Tenterfield through a range of youth, church, social support and rural groups.	
George Colin Debnam	For service to veterans, particularly through the Tasmanian Division of the Royal Australian Airforce Association, and to the community.	
Father John Michael Dobson	For service to religion and to the community of the Caloundra region, particularly through the promotion of ecumenism.	
Gerard A. Dowling	For service to the community through the Society of St Vincent de Paul and the Ozanam Community Board of Management.	
Freda Draper	For service to the community, particularly through the Carers Association of Western Australia.	
Isabel Frances Dunstan	For service to the community of Wangaratta through a range of health, service, youth and women's groups.	
Barry Reginald Easy	For service to sports administration, particularly the Special Olympics Program in Australia and in the South East Asian region.	
Paul Eckert	For service to the Pitjantjatjara people as a linguist, translator and literacy specialist and through the development of vernacular materials for bilingual education.	
Michael John Edgeloe	For service to the community through the Macquarie University 'Music on Winter Sundays' concerts and the compilation of programme notes for a variety of concerts and organisations.	
Owen Lloyd Edwards, ED	For service to veterans through the Moss Vale Sub-Branch of the Returned and Services League of Australia, and to the community.	
Richard Arthur Edwards	For service to the community, particularly through the YMCA movement.	
William Thomas Edwards	For service to veterans and their families, particularly through the Returned and Services League of Australia and the Vietnam Veterans' Association of Australia.	
Professor Frederick Ehrlich	For service to medicine in the fields of rehabilitation and extended care for the aged and people with disabilities, and to the community.	
Sawathey Ek	For service to the Cambodian community in New South Wales, particularly through the promotion of Cambodian art.	
Eric Theodore Evans	For service to veterans through the Hurstville Sub-Branch of the Australian Legion of Ex-Servicemen and Women.	
Jean Evelyn Feder	For service to the promotion of the educational needs of students with hearing impairments.	
Arthur Stanley Fields	For service to the welfare of veterans and their families, and to the community of Noble Park.	
Elizabeth Hamilton Finnegan	For service to the community, particularly through the aged care and educational agencies of the Uniting Church in Australia.	
Barry Fisher	For service to local government, particularly in the area of urban planning, and to the community of Hobart through a range of health, cultural and heritage groups.	
Cecil Allan Fisher	For service to indigenous people as an advocate for social justice, promotion of reconciliation, and improved access to health care, housing and community services.	
Joyce Fisher	For service to education, particularly as a tutor and advocate for children with specific learning difficulties and their families.	
Norma Lesley Flowerday	For service to the community, particularly through the Sacred Heart Mission, Bethlehem Hospital and Malvern Elderly Citizens Club.	
Cynthia Ann Foley	For service to the preservation of local history, particularly through the Dubbo Family History Society.	
Allan Maitland Fox	For service to conservation and the environment through education and management.	
Colin William Francis	For service to the community of Yeoval, particularly through the Yeoval Multi-Purpose Health Centre.	
Marie Anne Francis	For service to the community of Yeoval, particularly through health, education and church organisations.	
Elizabeth (Beth) Beryl Franz	For service to youth through the Scouting movement, and to the community of Denmark.	
Ivy Kathleen Freeman	For service to local government, and to the community of Tumby Bay.	
Victor Frizzell	For service to sailing in Queensland, particularly through the Royal Queensland Yacht Squadron.	
Gregory Edward Gallagher	For service to the community of Bungendore through emergency services, rural show and church organisations.	
Mart Valentine Gavin	For service to the health and welfare of veterans and their families through a range of ex-service organisations.	
Thomas Charles Gaynor	For service to the community, particularly through the Lithgow Highland Pipe Band.	
Volunteer 2nd Officer Peter John Geard	For service to the community of Brighton, particularly through the State Emergency Service and local government.	
Bruce Ireton Gillard	For service to the community of Tamworth, particularly the welfare of veterans and their families.	
William Anthony Gillespie	For service to the arts as an administrator, particularly the State Opera of South Australia.	
Olga Frances Girle	For service to the promotion of community health through the Australian Red Cross Blood Service.	
Valma Mary Gleeson	For service to the community through local government, aviation, art and craft, women's and aged care organisations.	
Francis Joseph Glover	For service to the veterans through the Returned and Services League of Australia, and to the community through a range of youth, sporting and civic groups.	
Jane Maris Glover	For service to palliative care nursing through the establishment and coordination of the Silent Visitors Volunteer Program, and to the community, particularly through the Sawtell Surf Life Saving Club.	
Estelle Clara Gold	For service to the community, particularly through Meals on Wheels and the National Council of Jewish Women.	
Marjorie Phyllis Goodwin-Dorning	For service to the development of amateur theatre within the Frankston and Mornington Peninsula region.	
John Francis James Gosling	For service to visually impaired people, particularly through the guide dog movement.	
Graham John Gould	For service to wheelchair sports, particularly basketball.	
David James Grace	For service to the community, particularly through traineeship and apprenticeship programmes, and family and aged care organisations.	
Brian Walter Gray	For service to business and commerce through the development and promotion of the tourism and hospitality industries, and to the community.	
Dr John Edmund Gray	For service to landscape architecture in the Australian Capital Territory, and to the community.	
Nanette Belle Green	For service to the community of Wangaratta through health, educational, historical and women's groups.	
William Ellis Green	For service to art as a cartoonist and illustrator, and to the community, particularly through the Good Friday Appeal of the Royal Children's Hospital.	
Thomas David Griffiths	For service to the aged through the Newcastle and District Meals on Wheels service.	
Leo Dennis (Lucky) Grills	For service to the entertainment industry, and to the community through charitable organisations.	
Georgina May Hackwood	For service to the promotion of community health through the Warwick Blood Bank.	
Jack Halber	For service to judo and to youth, particularly through the Eastern Suburbs Police Citizens' Youth Club.	
Vernon Noel Haley	For service to the community of Bunbury, particularly in the areas of environmental health and water services.	
Edmund Leslie Hall	For service to the community, to local government, and to the development of public transport in Adelaide.	
John Hamilton	For service to the community of the Gold Coast through the Southport Committee of the Queensland Ambulance Transport Brigade, Meals on Wheels and the Anglican Church.	
Jean Chalmers Hamley	For service to the community, particularly through the Executive Council of Auxiliaries of the Royal Victorian Eye and Ear Hospital.	
Margaret Janet Hammon	For service to the community, particularly through the Box Hill Branch of the Australian Red Cross and the Blackburn Branch of the Multiple Sclerosis Society of Victoria.	
Shirley Ann Harris	For service to the Australian Olympic Committee as an administrator.	
Gerald Hugh Hay	For service to youth, particularly through Police and Community Youth Clubs, and to judo.	
Raymond Philip Haylock	For service to sport, particularly cricket administration, in the Wide Bay and Burnett districts of Queensland.	
Margaret Hamilton Heathorn	For service to aged people through the Linlithgow Centre for the Older Person, and to the community.	
Cecile Golda Herman	For service to the community, particularly through the Ashfield Benevolent Society and the Ashfield Meals on Wheels.	
Kathleen Olive Herring	For service to the community, particularly through the Lottie Stewart Hospital Auxiliary.	
Herbert Morris Hesse	For service to lawn bowls as a player, coach and administrator.	
Allan William Hibble	For service to the transport industry, particularly through the Chartered Institute of Transport.	
Margot Lesley Hillel	For service to children's literature through research, teaching, and the Children's Book Council.	
Betty June Hite	For service to the communities of Burnie and Wynard, particularly through the Burnie Musical Society, Wynyard Transport Service and Umina Park Home for the Aged.	
Jill Hooper	For service to softball administration through the Townsville and Thuringowa Softball Association.	
Sandra Hoot	For service to nursing in the fields of mental health and developmental disabilities.	
Helen Horton	For service to literature through the Queensland Writers Centre and as editor of Imago, and to the environment through the Queensland Naturalists Club.	
Norman Howland	For service to the community, particularly through the Mackay and North Barrier Branches of Surf Life Saving Australia.	
Lorna Hudson	For service to community of Derby, particularly through the promotion of health programmes, introducing appropriate technologies to assist women, and as a spokesperson for indigenous affairs.	
Francis Ronald Hughes	For service to vocational training and education in the Wide Bay-Sunshine Coast region.	
Richard Gordon Hughes	For service to the welfare of veterans and their families through the Rats of Tobruk Association.	
Dr Peter Leslie Thomas Ilbery, RFD	For service to the community, particularly through the recording of the history of the air training school at Uranquinty.	
Jessica Mary Ruth Innes	For service to youth through the Guiding movement, and to the community.	
Major Roger Graham Isherwood, RFD, ED	For service to local government and to the community, particularly through organisations providing assistance to aged people and children in crisis.	
Dorothy Alexandrina Jack	For service to the community through the initiation and development of the Combined Charities Christmas Card Shop concept as a means of raising funds for charity.	
Professor Edwin Kent Glauert Jaggard	For service as an administrator in the area of surf life saving and through the Western Australian Sports Federation.	
Bruce William Stodart James	For service to the community, and to the engineering profession.	
Dorothy Irma Jamieson	For service to the community of Queanbeyan through youth, health and aged care groups.	
George Leslie Johnson	For service to the preservation and recording of local history as a researcher and author.	
Norman Edward Jolly	For service to the community, particularly through the Brisbane City Mission and the Safety House programme.	
Gary Austin Jones	For service to the community, particularly through the State Emergency Service.	
Jennifer Kaberry	For service to conservation and the environment through the Mid-North Coast Branch of the National Parks Association.	
David Keith Keene	For service to the community, particularly through the Burrum Heads Progress Association and the Burrum Heads Rural Fire Brigade.	
Peter James Keighran	For service to the community of Nyngan through sporting, emergency service and youth groups.	
Florence Merle Kelly	For service to the community of the Camden and Wollondilly regions, particularly through social welfare, charitable and historical organisations.	
Mayor Janice Roslyn Kelly	For service to local government, and to the community of Kangaroo Island.	
Kathleen Edna Kelly	For service to veterans, particularly as a fundraiser and volunteer worker for the Sir Leslie Morshead War Veterans' Home.	
Laurence James Kenna	For service to local government and to the community of the Mortlake-Terang region, particularly through health, aged care, sporting and service groups.	
Michael John Kent	For service to veterans, particularly through the Macarthur Sub-Branch of the Returned and Services League of Australia, and to the community.	
Douglas H. Kershaw	For service to science and primary industry, particularly through the promotion and distribution of the dung beetle in Tasmania.	
Howard Lyle Knox	For service to the aviation industry, particularly as Manager of Bankstown Airport and as the founder of the Australian Aviation Museum, and to the community.	
Jo Anne Kokas	For service to animal welfare, particularly through the rehabilitation of neglected and injured donkeys and as co-founder of the Good Samaritan Donkey Supporters Inc located in Maitland.	
Dr Srechko Jernej Kontelj	For service to multiculturalism in the community of Geelong, particularly through the Geelong Migrant Resource Centre, and to local government.	
Jacob (Jack) Kronhill	For service to the community, particularly through outreach support services for cancer patients at the Peter MacCallum Cancer Institute and Jewish community service organisations.	
Harry Kuhaupt	For service to the Western Australian Fire Brigades' Superannuation Board, particularly through innovations and developments to optimise member benefits.	
Dr Margaret Rose Kyrkou	For service to children with disabilities in South Australia, particularly in the areas of education, health and welfare.	
Marie Ann Lade	For service to the community, particularly through the Umina Neighbourhood Watch scheme.	
Rosalind Jeanne Landells	For service to the preservation of the local history of Brighton.	
Gladys Marjorie (Mardi) Lang	For service to the community, particularly through the Guiding movement in the Gold Coast Region and the Queensland Country Women's Association.	
Eve Miriam Laron	For service to architecture, particularly in the field of passive solar design and energy efficiency, and to the advancement of women architects and women working within the construction industry through the founding of the organisation, Constructive Women.	
Jennette Lavis	For service to early childhood education and as an advocate for the protection of children, particularly through Child Watch.	
Peter James Lawler	For service to Rugby Union football in the Australian Capital Territory as a referee and administrator, and to the community.	
James Michael Leahy	For service to the community of Perth, particularly through local government activities, and to harness racing.	
The Venerable Robert Anthony Christopher Legg	For service to the Anglican Church in Tasmania and to the community, particularly the welfare of children.	
Jocelyn Mavis Lester	For service to softball, particularly as a representative player and as a coach.	
Lois Daphne Levy	For service to the environment, particularly through the Gecko, Gold Coast and Hinterland Environment Council and the Friends of Currumbin Association Inc.	
Dr Lyndel Kaye Littlefield	For service to the welfare of children and families, particularly through the Victorian Parenting Centre, and the development and advancement of training and education in the field of child, adolescent and family psychology.	
James Edward Liu, OBE	For service to the Chinese community in Queensland, particularly through business development activities and charitable groups.	
Noelene (Jan) Livingstone	For service to women in the Anglican Church community, particularly through the Mothers' Union of the Anglican Church of Australia.	
John Henry Lockett	For service to the community of Bendigo, particularly as a representative of Australia war veterans.	
John Edward Lundholm	For service to the sport of rodeo, as a rider and administrator, to the racing industry as a horse trainer, and to the community.	
John Crawshay Mackillop	For service to the community, particularly through the Presbyterian Church of Australia (NSW).	
John Mathwin	For service to the community, to local government and to the South Australian Parliament.	
Ronald Francis Maynard	For service to the community of the Banana Shire, and to local government.	
Timothy Hocart McCombe	For service to veterans and their families, particularly through the Vietnam Veterans' Federation of Australia.	
Eric Rae McCrum	For service to environmental education, conservation and natural history, particularly through the Herdsman Lake Wildlife Centre and the Western Australian Gould League.	
Howard Charles McKenzie	For service to the community of Camperdown, particularly through veterans', service, rural fire service and historical groups.	
Robyn Ann McKerlie	For service to children with a cleft condition and to their families through CleftPALS Victoria.	
Joan Margaret McNamara	For service to the community of Broke, particularly through the organisation of the annual Village Fair.	
Beverley Anne Meldrum	For service to the community, particularly through the Guiding movement in Victoria and the Pyalong Branch of the Australian Red Cross.	
Brian Mellifont	For service to local government and to the community of Brisbane through sporting, health and aged care groups.	
John David Methven	For service to veterans, particularly through the Vietnam Veterans Association of Australia.	
Dr Georgette Tawfik Michail	For service to the Australian Egyptian community in South Australia, particularly through cultural education activities and assisting newly arrived migrants.	
John Raynor Michell	For service to the community, particularly youth through the Flagstaff Hill Scout Group.	
Kenneth Charles Minter	For service to sailing as a competitor, trainer and administrator.	
Alfred John Mitchell BEM	For service to the forestry industry, particularly through the development of forest farming using native timber species, and to the environment.	
Gerald Stephen Moore	For service to the community, particularly in the administration and development of health services through the Queensland Ambulance Service.	
Michael Dennis Morgan	For service to rowing as a coach, competitor and administrator.	
Earl Edwin Morris	For service to the development of youth through the Rotary Youth Exchange Program.	
Patrick Joseph Mullins	For service to the community as an honorary legal adviser, and to cricket administration, particularly through the Queensland Cricket Association.	
Michael Joseph Murphy	For service to the community of Nairne, particularly through local government, service and sporting organisations.	
Dr Rajaratnam Natkunam	For service to medicine as a surgeon, and to the community of North-West Queensland.	
John Robert Newton	For service to people with disabilities, particularly through the organisation Tasmanians with Disabilities.	
Jeffery Kak-Leang Ng	For service to the Chinese community and to the promotion of the benefits of cultural and ethnic diversity.	
Elva May Nichol	For service to youth through the Uniting Church in Australia.	
John William Nicholas	For service to local government and to the community of Wellington, particularly through the Lake Burrendong State Park Trust.	
Michelle Fay Nichols	For service to the community through the preservation of the history of the Hawkesbury District.	
Barbara Dorothy Nixon	For service to the community, particularly through the Royal Historical Society of Victoria.	
Mary Teresa O'Callaghan	For service to the community of the Australian Capital Territory through church-based activities, refugee assistance and social welfare organisations.	
Peter Francis O'Reilly	For service as a pioneer in the ecotourism industry in South-East Queensland.	
Sydney William O'Reilly, MBE	For service to veterans and their families, particularly through the Thirtyniners' Association of Australia.	
Felix John Parker	For service to the community, particularly through the Council of the Shire of Esk and the Lowood Sub-Branch of the Returned and Services League of Australia.	
Ian Keith Passmore	For service to the community, particularly through the provision of neurological support services.	
Audrey Gertrude Peacock	For service to the community, particularly through Soroptimist International in Southern Queensland.	
David Bruce Pearce	For service to people with disabilities, particularly through the National Disability Advisory Council, and to the community.	
Selwyn Kelvey Pearson	For service to the community of Broadmeadows, particularly through Rotary International.	
Kemball Lewis Perkins	For service to business, to the dairy industry and to the community within the Latrobe district.	
William Roy Perryman	For service to the community of Mitcham, and to veterans.	
Judith Nancy Perryn	For service to the development of public health awareness and education, particularly through the Endometriosis Association of Queensland.	
Colin Mitchell Piper	For service to the community, particularly through the Wynnum Manly Employment and Training Association and Rotary International.	
Jean Florence Mary Pottie	For service to the local community of Tarcutta, particularly through the Tarcutta Hospital Auxiliary and the Tarcutta Presbyterian Women's Association.	
Joseph Martin Pyke	For service to the community, particularly through the Queensland Ambulance Service and Rotary International.	
Judith Anne Quilter	For service to library sciences, particularly as Medical Librarian at the Royal Victorian Eye and Ear Hospital.	
Charlotte (Sharnee) Reeves	For service to the community of Hill Top.	
Justin Roald Rickard	For service to electrical engineering and to the community, particularly through Mission Australia.	
Angelo Antonio Rigoni	For service to primary industry in Australia.	
Sylvia Adele (Dell) Roberts	For service to lawn bowls as a player, coach, umpire and administrator.	
Alan George Robinson	For service to veterans, particularly through the RSL Community Link programme, and to the community of Bribie Island.	
Ben Floyd Robinson	For service to transport, particularly the taxi industry in South Australia.	
Denise Margaret Robinson	For service to the community, particularly through Family Aid to Mission.	
Dr John Vincent Roche	For service to medicine as a general practitioner, and to the community of Moss Vale.	
Kevin Clive Rogers	For service to the community, particularly through Rotary International, the Phoenix Society and the Australian Railway Historical Society, and to youth.	
Rabbi David Rogut	For service to the Jewish community, particularly through the North Shore Synagogue, and to education.	
Vinko Romanik	For service to the Croatian community of Adelaide.	
Kay Rose	For service to the community of the Northern Territory through tourism development, education administration and local government.	
John Dudley Roulston	For service to the pastoral industry, particularly through the introduction of aerial mustering within Western Australia, and to aviation.	
Noel Colin Rundle	For service to Australian Rules football, particularly through the Victorian Amateur Football Association, and to the community.	
William James Rushton	For service to local government, and to the community of the Cooma-Monaro region.	
Doris Jean Ryan	For service to the community, particularly through the activities of the VIEW Clubs of Australia.	
Mary Margaret Ryan	For service to the community of the Pyalong district through church, women's, historical, cultural and service groups.	
Peter Francis Ryan APM	For service to the community through social welfare, sporting and youth organisations.	
Mary Sawyer	For service to the community, particularly through organisations providing social support, welfare services, and aged and health care.	
Robert Arnold Schuck	For service to veterans, particularly through the NSW RSL Bowls Association.	
Robert Neil Schulz	For service to the community of Killarney and district, particularly through the auxiliary urban fire service.	
Fathi (Fred) Shahin	For service to the community, particularly through financial support for the establishment of the Islamic-Arabic Centre in Adelaide.	
Charles David Shakespeare	For service to the community of Parramatta, particularly through historical research and the preservation of historical sites, and to education.	
Stanley J. (Pat) Share	For service to veterans, particularly through recording the history of the 2/23rd Infantry Battalion.	
Harvey Shaw	For service to veterans, particularly through the Federation of Jewish Ex-Servicemen and Women, and to the community through aged care, health and service groups.	
Leonard George Shaw	For service to business, particularly the amusement, leisure and recreation industry.	
Mary Frances Shearer	For service to the community, particularly through the Country Women's Association of Western Australia.	
Gwendoline Silvey	For service to the community of the Blue Mountains, particularly through historical research and the preservation of heritage sites.	
Robin Peter Simson	For service to orienteering, to outdoor education, and to the environment through the Toohey Forest Protection Society.	
Brother Edmund Slattery	For service to youth, particularly as Chaplain of the Reiby and Keelong Juvenile Justice Centres, and to the Marist Brothers.	
Herbert Vincent Frederick Sloane	For service to primary education in Victoria, and to the community through education and welfare organisations, the Gould League, the National Trust and Rotary International.	
Donald Bruce Smith	For service to newspaper journalism in Western Australia, particularly as a political reporter and editor.	
Dorothy Elaine Smith	For service to the community, particularly through the Asthma Foundation of New South Wales, the Schizophrenia Fellowship of New South Wales and the Action Foundation for Mental Health.	
Dr Leonard Hart Smith	For service to conservation and the environment as Director of National Parks, Victoria, and as a contributor to research and study of the lyrebird.	
Margaret Merea Jean Smith	For service to the community of Capel through youth, aged care, environmental and emergency service organisations.	
Richard John Smith	For service to community organisations, particularly as an accountant and auditor.	
Harold Charles Snell	For service to the community, particularly through Lions Clubs International.	
Heino Sommer	For service to the community, particularly through the Adelaide Estonian Society and the Rotary Club of Woodville.	
Peter Christian Sorensen	For service to sailing, and as a fundraiser for leukaemia research.	
Joyce Constance Stanford	For service to the community, particularly through the Henley Beach and Grange Branches of Meals on Wheels and the Ryder Cheshire Foundation of South Australia.	
Norman Thomas Starks	For service to the community of McLaren Vale/Willunga, particularly through service and veterans' organisations.	
Arthur Lavender Stephenson	For service to medicine in the field of plastic and reconstructive surgery at the Royal Hobart Hospital.	
Una Florence Sternbeck	For service to the community of Wollombi Valley.	
John Michael Stewart	For service to the community, particularly through the Multiple Sclerosis Society of South Australia.	
Dr Rex Stubbs	For service to local government, and to the community of the Hawkesbury area.	
Eugeniusz Stuliglowa	For service to the Polish community in Queensland.	
Pamela June Sullivan	For service to the community of Leeton and the Riverina District as a swimming instructor, coach and administrator.	
Joan Eleanor Summers PSM	For service to the community of Bendigo, and to youth through the Scouting movement.	
Joyce Elizabeth (Nean) Swonnell	For service to the community, particularly through Statewide Autistic Services Inc.	
Dudley Cecil (Curley) Symonds	For service to the community, particularly to youth through the Cronulla RSL Youth Club.	
Carol Anne Tanner	For service to young people with intellectual disabilities through the Tasmanian Branch of Special Olympics Australia and the New Horizons Club in Launceston.	
Bruce William Tatham	For service to the fishing industry in the Mandurah area and to the local community, particularly through the Peel Inlet Management Authority.	
Benjamin Stuart Taylor	For service to deaf and hearing impaired people, particularly through the Australian Deaf Lawn Bowls Association, and to lawn bowls.	
Jacqueline Lynette Thomson	For service to the community of the Milton/Ulladulla area through Meals on Wheels, women's, rural and church organisations.	
John Roy Thorpe	For service to the community, particularly through the Returned and Services League of Australia and Quiet Lion Tours.	
Ronald Stanley Thyer	For service to conservation and the environment, to engineering, and to the community, particularly through the work of Community Aid Abroad.	
William Arthur Tomlinson	For service to veterans and their families, particularly through the Australian Army Training Team Vietnam Association.	
Emily Julia Tonna	For service to the community of Broken Hill through the Society of St Vincent de Paul.	
Leila Patricia Tozer	For service to the community, particularly through the Blue Mountains Group of Torchbearers for Legacy.	
Steve Joseph Trabilsie	For service to the community, particularly as a volunteer providing care and assistance for the terminally ill, people with disabilities, the homeless and the aged.	
Zona Catherine Tripp	For service to the community as a fundraiser for charities, particularly the Multiple Sclerosis Society of NSW.	
Roy Gerald Tuohy	For service to the cinema industry, particularly through the preservation of the history and tradition of film and cinema entertainment, and to the community as a fundraiser.	
John Damien Vines	For service to the engineering and scientific community through the development of educational programs to enhance managerial skills.	
Dr Peter Foord Wallace	For service to medicine, and to the community of the Murray Shire.	
Greta Adeline Warner	For service to the community, particularly through the Queensland Country Women's Association.	
Allan Bruce Waugh	For service to veterans and their families, particularly through the HMAS Mildura Association.	
Betty Mary Whitelaw	For service to children with cancer through the Camp Quality Manning Valley Support Group.	
Mary Beth Williams	For service to the conservation of Australia's natural heritage, particularly in the Northern Tablelands area of New South Wales.	
Trevor David Williams	For service to international trade, and to the development of the freight forwarding and transport industries.	
Elva May Wilson	For service to women, particularly through the Queensland Country Women's Association.	
Dr William Gordon Wilson	For service to the dental profession and to the community, particularly children with disabilities.	
Joan Marjorie Winter	For service to the nursing profession in Queensland, particularly as an administrator and through the development of nurse education.	
Dorothy Alleyne Womersley	For service to women through the Young Women's Christian Association, the National Council of Women of South Australia and the United Nations Association Australia (SA) Status of Women Committee.	
Nellie Dorothy Woolaston	For service to visually impaired children through the creation and production of tactile books as a learning aid.	
Charles Wilbur Wright	For service to sport, particularly Modern Pentathlon, as a competitor and administrator, and to the community through heritage and ex-service organisations.	
Ben Lonyainga Yengi	For service to the community, particularly migrants and refugees, to multiculturalism, and to the arts.	
Michael De Dutton York	For service to the preservation of maritime history in Australia, particularly through the restoration of historic Australian ships.	
Brian James Young	For service to the Australian country music industry as a songwriter, singer, entertainer and promoter of young talent.	

==== Military Division ====
Branch	Recipient	Citation	Notes
Navy	Commander John Richard Brown, RAN	For meritorious service to the Australian Defence Force as Director of Military Support in the Defence Community Organisation Headquarters.	
Navy	Warrant Officer Brian Edward Cummins	For meritorious service to the Royal Australian Navy in the area of operational communications support.	
Navy	Warrant Officer Roger Glen Rigby	For meritorious service to the Royal Australian Navy, particularly as the Bosun aboard HMAS SUCCESS.	
Navy	Warrant Officer Bruce Martin Tunnah	For meritorious service to the Royal Australian Navy as the Staff Officer Aviation Engineering, Directorate of Navy Professional Requirements (Engineering and Logistics), Navy Systems Command.	
Army	Warrant Officer Class 1 Thomas Wayne Alexander	For meritorious service to the Australian Army in the field of information technology.	
Army	Warrant Officer Class 1 Allan Ross Andrews	For meritorious service to the Australian Army as the Squadron Sergeant Major of 21st Construction Squadron.	
Army	Warrant Officer Class 1 Mark Andrew Chaston	For meritorious service to the Australian Army in the field of electrical and mechanical engineering, and as the Artificer Sergeant Major of Vehicle Technology Wing, Army Logistic Training Centre.	
Army	Warrant Officer Class 2 Jennifer Anne Jiear	For meritorious service to the Australian Army as the Chief Clerk at the 5th Aviation Regiment and the loth Force Support Battalion.	
Army	Warrant Officer Class 2 David William McCamley	For meritorious service to the Australian Army as a Company and Squadron Sergeant Major within the Special Forces Group.	
Army	Warrant Officer Class 1 William Joseph Whitburn	For meritorious service to the Australian Army as the Regimental Sergeant Major of 12th/16th Hunter River Lancers and the 1st Armoured Regiment.	
Air Force	Warrant Officer Paul Desmond Ellis	For meritorious service to the Royal Australian Air Force at Number 92 Wing Development Flight, RAAF Base Edinburgh.	
Air Force	Sergeant Kevin Andrew Le Poidevin	For meritorious service to the Royal Australian Air Force as an Advanced Avionics Technician employed in the maintenance of F/A-18 Hornet aircraft equipment at Number 75 Squadron.	
Air Force	Group Captain Barrie John Miller, MBE	For meritorious service to the Royal Australian Air Force in the field of strategic management of Australian Defence Force Movements.	
Air Force	Warrant Officer Ian John Payne	For meritorious service to the Australian Defence Force in the fields of logistics management.	
Air Force	Sergeant Bernadette Mary Wheeler	For meritorious service to the Australian Defence Force in support of the United Nations during East Timor operations.	
