= Douglas Hall =

Douglas Hall may refer to:

- Douglas Kent Hall (1938–2008), American writer and photographer
- Sir Douglas Hall, 1st Baronet (1866–1923), member of parliament for the Isle of Wight
- Sir Douglas Hall, 14th Baronet (1909–2004), British colonial administrator
- Douglas John Hall (born 1928), Canadian Christian minister and theologian
- Dougie Hall (born 1980), Scottish rugby union player
- Doug Hall (artist) (born 1944), American photographer and media artist
- Doug Hall (inventor), American author and inventor
- Douglas Hall (historian) (1920–1999), Jamaican historian
- Doug Hall (art curator) (born 1954), Australian art curator and historian
