= 2001 Australian Democrats leadership spill =

Australian political party election

- April 2001
- Registered: 3,000
- Turnout: 75%
- Leadership election
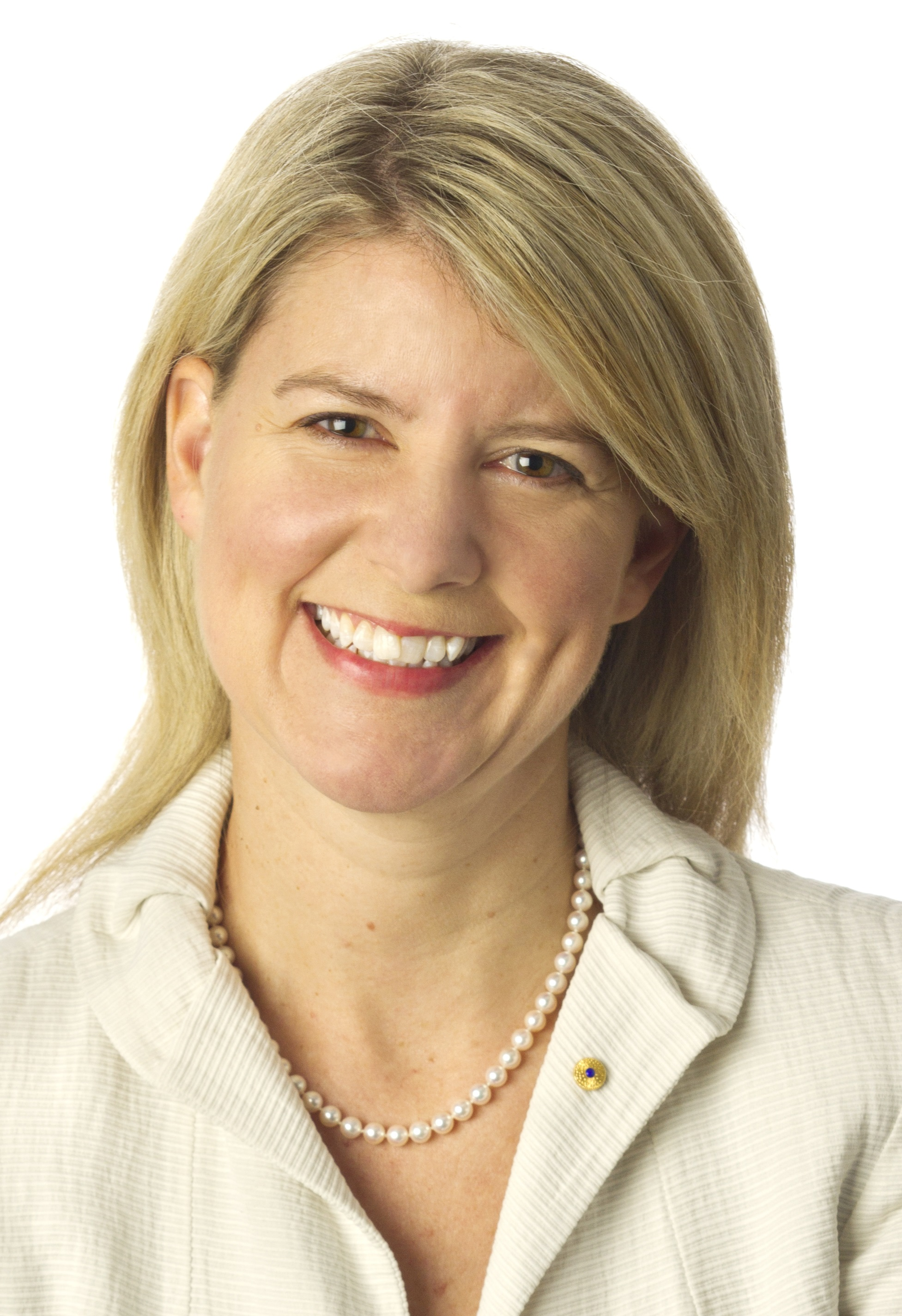

Candidate	Natasha Stott Despoja	Meg Lees
Members' vote	69%	31%
State	South Australia	South Australia
Leader before election
Meg Lees
Elected Leader
Natasha Stott Despoja
- Deputy leadership election
Candidate	Aden Ridgeway
Members' vote	Won
State	New South Wales
Deputy Leader before election
Natasha Stott Despoja
Elected Deputy Leader
Aden Ridgeway

The 2001 Australian Democrats leadership spill was held in April 2001 to elect the leader of the Australian Democrats.

Incumbent leader Meg Lees was defeated by deputy leader Natasha Stott Despoja after a vote of the party's rank-and-file membership, becoming the youngest-ever person to lead a federal parliamentary political party in Australia. Aden Ridgeway replaced Stott Despoja as deputy leader.

== Background ==
In 1999, after negotiations with Liberal prime minister John Howard, the Democrats party room agreed to support the passage of the Goods and Services Tax (GST). Two dissident senators on the party's left, Natasha Stott Despoja and Andrew Bartlett, voted against the GST legislation.

The decision to pass the GST was opposed by the majority of Democrats rank-and-file members, and led to internal conflict and tensions surrounding the leadership of Meg Lees. Under the party's constitution, a petition signed by 100 members can trigger a leadership spill. Stott Despoja announced on 27 February 2001 that she would challenge Lees, and after voting took place via post, she emerged victorious on 6 April 2001. Stott Despoja won 69% of the vote, as well as the support of membership in every state.

== Endorsements ==
=== Natasha Stott Despoja ===
List of Natasha Stott Despoja endorsements

Former Democrats leaders

- Don Chipp – Leader of the Australian Democrats (1977–1986)

== Aftermath ==
Throughout 2002, Stott Despoja struggled to keep the Democrats together as senators publicly strayed from party positions and privately expressed a lack of confidence in her leadership. In March 2002, Ridgeway publicly stated that the party was wrong to replace Lees.

After the party opened an investigation into Lees for allegedly damaging party unity, which Lees and her allies saw as part of a campaign by Stott Despoja to silence her, Lees left the Democrats in July 2002 and formed the Australian Progressive Alliance. Her departure was followed by a stand-off with Andrew Murray, who threatened to follow her.

After deciding to stay, Murray proposed a ten-point package to reform party structures and address the issues raised by Lees, designed to shift power from the leader. At a party room meeting on 21 August 2002, all ten measures were passed four votes to three: Murray, Ridgeway, Lyn Allison and John Cherry in favour, with Stott Despoja and her allies Andrew Bartlett and Brian Greig against. Understanding her position to be untenable after this defeat, Stott Despoja announced her resignation as Democrats leader to the Senate after 16-and-a-half months in the role.

Support for the Democrats fell significantly at the 2004 federal election in which it achieved only 2.1% of the national Senate vote. Its remaining Senate seats were lost at the 2007 federal election.
