= George North (Tramountanas) =

Greek settler in South Australia

George Tramountanas (1822 – 29 January 1911), anglicised as George North and born as Georgios Tramountanas in 1822, was a Greek Australian reputed to have been the first Greek emigrant in South Australia. The ethnic Greek and Greek Orthodox community of South Australia regards North (Tramountanas) as their Pioneering Grandfather.

== Early life ==
The Tramountanas family reputedly migrated from Lemnos, North Aegean islands. George came from a family of shipbuilders and seamen and had travelled to Australia as a teenager before finally arriving at Port Adelaide, South Australia, in 1842. He worked for some time in Port Adelaide before gaining employment at Edward John Peake's Winery after 1846 in the newly gazetted township of Clarendon. There he helped cultivate the early vines and made brandy and wines. In 1857 he was recorded as a crew member on the steamship SS Admella for about 12 months. The Admella was shipwrecked at Cape Northumberland near Nelson, Victoria, on 6 August 1859, only 11 months after hosting George's wedding reception on its decks.

== Marriage ==
George Tramountanas anglicised his name to George North before his marriage to English woman Lydia Vosper on 26 September 1858; she arrived from Devon, England, aboard the Caucasian in 1855. Soon after they moved to Port Lincoln where George found work as a shepherd employed by James Stuart Sinclair on his GreenPatch run about 14 Miles north of Pt Lincoln. George & Lydia would have been living in a shepherd's hut somewhere on the GreenPatch run when their two sons George Henry (born in 1861) and Hero Clare (born in 1862) were born. They moved again in 1869, purchasing an 80-acre (320,000 m^{2}) block on Wine Shanty Road Little Swamp where George grazed sheep. In the mid-1870s George and Lydia purchase Lot: 24 in the new township of Bramfield, where they lived with their two young sons while George tended to his sheep on his nearby properties.

== Late life and death ==
On the 8 April 1878 George North applied to be naturalised as a British Subject as recorded on his Memorial held in the National Archives of Australia. Early in 1884 George and Lydia purchased a property which fronted the Old Coach Road, just south-east of Bramfield; they named this property "North Park" and it became a rest stop for travellers as the team of horses was changed over for the mail coach. The Old Coach Road stretched from Port Lincoln to Streaky Bay, South Australia and passed through places like Green Patch, Mt Hope, Sheringa and Bramfield. George and Lydia hosted a wedding reception at their North Park property on 4 November 1884 for their first son George Henry and his new wife Eliza Valkema. The first six grandchildren were also born here as Lydia became midwife to a growing family. The Colton Hotel was opened in the same year by their neighbours the Kenny family. In 1885 George and Lydia's second son Hero married Rosina Ann Boylan, and they moved into George and Lydia's old house at Lot: 24 Bramfield. George North was included in a photo in The Chronicle commemorating the occasion of West Coast Pastoralists at Elliston in 1888, to meet with the South Australian Government, to air their grievances about the paltry amounts of money being offered for improvements on their leasehold properties. The 21 year leases issued in 1867 were due to expire and the Pastoral Board undertook a review of the rents. The leases were cancelled and resumed by the Crown, subdivided and offered at public auction. Bidding was intense and the Surveyor General noted that valuations were exceeded by up to eight times. According to "A Greek Pioneer in Australia" by the late Ellen Purcell - George, Lydia, Hero and Rosina bought 3,000 acres (12 km^{2}) of the Mt. Wedge sheep station to add to their Bald Hills property "The Block" now totaling 8,000 acres (32 km^{2}). George and Lydia retired and lived their final years with their son Hero and his wife Rosina at their Newland Grange homestead at Colton, South Australia. George North died on 29 January 1911 and his wife Lydia on 20 November 1913; they are both buried in the Old Colton Catholic Cemetery. They were survived by their two sons and 22 grandchildren. George and Lydia's grandson, Hero Clarence North, served in the First Australian Imperial Force during WWI, and died of his wounds in Picardie, France, in 1916.

== Legacy ==
It is estimated there are some 1700 direct descendants of George North (Tramountanas) now living in Australia. The Greek Orthodox Community of South Australia regards George as their Pioneering Grandfather. They placed a memorial stone at his gravesite in 1994 and along with local North Descendants, planted an Olive Grove on the walkway leading to his grave. They also held a Panagiri festival in his honour at Elliston South Australia in 1998, and he is mentioned in many publications from the Greek Community. On Saturday 30 October 2022, busts of George and his wife Lydia were unveiled at the SA Migration Museum, celebrating the 200th anniversary of George's birth and the 180th anniversary of his arrival in Adelaide.

=== Descendants ===
Hereunder some notable descendants and/or descendants on the public record:

- former senator Andrew Bartlett
- women's advocate Lesley Bartlett
- physicist Marissa Bartlett
- Catholic priest Leon Dowden
- astrophysicist/geophysicist Richard Dowden (scientist)
- musician Clare Moore
- AFL player Chris Judd
- jurist Wendy Purcell
