= Beryl Ingold =

Australian community leader (1927–2011)

Beryl Elizabeth Ingold AO MBE
- Born: 4 March 1927; Sydney, Australia
- Died: 7 April 2011 (aged 84); Cootamundra, New South Wales, Australia
- Occupation: Community leader
- Known for: advocating for the advancement of agriculture, education and women

Beryl Elizabeth Ingold AO MBE (née Watters; 4 March 1927 – 7 April 2011) was an Australian community leader.

Known for her work in the field of agriculture and education, Ingold served in many roles with numerous local and state organisations in New South Wales.

In 1974 she was the first woman in Australia to lead an agricultural organisation when she was elected president of the Agricultural Bureau of New South Wales.

== Biography ==
After being born in Sydney, Ingold was raised in Cootamundra from the age of eight months old.

After being named Cootamundra's Citizen of the Year in 1970, Ingold's responsibilities increased further afield as she became involved in various New South Wales organisations.

In late 1974 Ingold was named one of the Australian convenors of International Women's Year which was held in 1975.

From 1974 to 1979 she was president of the Agricultural Bureau of New South Wales and was its treasurer from 1979 to 1999. From 1976 to 1977, she was the vice-president of the New South Wales Rural Youth State Council.

Ingold was a member of the Women's Advisory Council to the Premier of New South Wales from 1981 to 1984 and then from 1985 to 1987, she was the chairperson of the ministerial advisory committee for the Department of Family and Children's Services.

From 1987 to 1992 she was chairperson of the Riverina Council of Adult Education and also the deputy chairperson of the New South Wales Board of Education from 1989 to 1991. In 1994, she was the chairperson of the Cootamundra District Land Board and the chairperson of the Riverina Institute of TAFE's advisory council.

Other roles Ingold held during her career include serving as the New South Wales vice-president of the Country Women's Association, chairperson of the University of New England's Agricultural College at Orange, chairperson of the Riverina Industry Development Board, and a director of the Cootamundra Hospital.

In 1990 her 650-acre sheep property at Muttama was severely impacted by a bushfire. An estimated 1,500 sheep were killed while eight kilometres of fencing was also destroyed.

In 1992 Ingold sat on a Legal Profession Disciplinary Tribunal as a lay member alongside Sir Maurice Byers QC and Douglas Staff QC to hear a complaint about ACT Director of Public Prosecutions Ken Crispin QC who was accused of professional misconduct and faced allegations of defaming and scandalising a former public servant at the Chelmsford Royal Commission in 1990. Crispin was later cleared of any wrongdoing, with the tribunal taking only minutes to dismiss the complaint at the conclusion of the three-day hearing.

== Honours ==
Ingold was awarded an MBE in the 1980 New Year Honours for her service to agriculture and the community.

In 1981 she was awarded an Australia-New Zealand Foundation scholarship to study agriculture in New Zealand.

In 1986 she was awarded an honorary degree, gaining a Bachelor of Applied Science (Agriculture) from the Riverina-Murray Institute of Higher Education at Wagga Wagga.

Ingold was made a Fellow of the University of New England in 1991 and was then awarded an honorary Doctor of Letters degree from the same university in 1993.

She was awarded the Centenary Medal in 2001 for her long and outstanding service to agriculture, education, and the community.

In the 2001 Queen's Birthday Honours, Ingold was appointed as an Officer of the Order of Australia for "service to the rural community in the areas of regional development and education, particularly recognition of the importance of management training in the agribusiness sector, the development of agricultural industries, and to the welfare of rural women."

== Legacy ==
In 2009 one of the new accommodation blocks at the Orange campus of Charles Stuart University was named Ingold House in acknowledgement of her significant contribution to the university.

A plaque was unveiled at Cootamundra Public School in December 2012 in honour of Ingold.

Ingold Street in the Canberra suburb of Coombs was named in her honour and was officially gazetted in 2013.

== Personal life and death ==
Ingold married her husband Edward Thomas Ingold in Cootamundra on 7 January 1950.

She died at the age of 84 on 7 April 2011.
