= James May (vascular surgeon) =

Australian vascular surgeon (1934-2021)

James May AC FRACS
- Born: 9 May 1934; Gulgong, New South Wales, Australia
- Died: 24 March 2021 (aged 86)
- Education: University of Sydney
- Occupation: Vascular surgeon

James May (9 May 1934 – 24 March 2021) was an Australian vascular surgeon and university professor. He made significant advancements in the diagnosis and treatment of vascular diseases, particularly in the areas of arterial and venous disorders. He introduced endovascular (minimally invasive) surgical techniques for arterial grafting to Australia. May was Head of the Division of Surgery at the Royal Prince Alfred Hospital from 1979 to 1995 and was also the Bosch Professor of Surgery at the University of Sydney from 1979 to 2014. May was awarded Australia's highest civilian honour, Companion of the Order of Australia, in 2001.

== Early life and education ==
May was born on 9 May 1934 in the Australian town of Gulgong, where his parents ran a hotel. He completed his undergraduate studies at the University of Sydney in 1958, obtaining a Bachelor of Medicine and Bachelor of Surgery (MBBS) degree, followed by a master's degree in 1979, and his general surgical residency took place at the Royal Prince Alfred Hospital in Sydney. In 1964, he took up the post of Research Fellow at the University of California in San Francisco, in the field of transplant surgery. This was followed by a year at the University of Manchester in the United Kingdom. He pursued specialised training in vascular surgery, obtaining a Fellowship of the Royal Australasian College of Surgeons (FRACS) in Vascular Surgery.

== Career ==
May was the Bosch Professor of Surgery at the University of Sydney from 1979 to 2014. At the Royal Prince Alfred Hospital, he was Head of the Division of Surgery from 1979 to 1995, and also Head of the Department of General Surgery from 1979 to 1988.

In 1983, he led the surgical team in Boston that transplanted a patient's hand. The patient's right arm and left hand had been badly injured in an explosion six years before, and his right hand was transplanted onto his left arm to give the potential for a functional limb. In 1997, May pioneered the process of using keyhole surgery and temporarily stopping the heart to fit a graft in order to treat an aneurysm of the aorta close to the heart. This method allowed more accurate placement of the graft, and improved patients' chances of survival.

Together with Professor John Harris, he established the Masters of Surgery-by-coursework program, which began in 2004. After retiring, he was appointed an Emeritus Professor and he continued to teach medical students.

According to the Royal Australian College of Surgeons, May was responsible for introducing the discipline of endovascular surgery into Australia. He served on professional societies including the International Society for Endovascular Surgery (board of directors), the International Society of Endovascular Specialists (board of directors, including as president from 2005 to 2007), and the International Society for Cardiovascular Surgery (president from 2001 to 2004). He held positions on the editorial panels of professional publications including the Australian and New Zealand Journal of Surgery, the Journal of Endovascular Surgery, the Journal of Endovascular Therapy, the Journal of Vascular Surgery, the Journal of Cardiovascular Surgery, the Annals of Vascular Diseases, and the Asian Journal of Surgery.

May's research interests were in the development of minimally invasive techniques for vascular surgery. He published over 400 articles about surgery, mostly focused on improving patient outcomes, reducing surgical complications, and exploring new treatment techniques. As of February 2024, ResearchGate lists 8,817 citations of his work.

== Awards and recognition ==
In 1987, the Royal College of Surgeons (England) awarded May the Sims Commonwealth travelling professorship. May received the Australian Medical Association's Henry Simpson Medal and prize in surgery, and the Kellogg Foundation (US) Kellogg Fellowship. In 2009, the Vascular Surgical Society (US) presented him with their Distinguished Lifetime Achievement award.

In the Queen's Birthday Honours list of 11 June 2001, he was appointed a Companion of the Order of Australia "for service to the advancement of vascular surgery throughout the world, particularly through pioneering the introduction of endoluminal methods for the treatment of diseased arteries, placing Australia in the forefront internationally in this field".

== Personal life ==
May was married twice: in 1959 to Judith, who became the mayor of Woollahra, and again in 1994. He had two children from the first marriage, and another two from the second marriage.
