= Alan Morton (rugby union) =

Australian rugby union player (1934–2026)

- Full name: Alan Ridley Morton
- Born: 10 September 1934 Queanbeyan, New South Wales, Australia
- Died: 15 May 2026 (aged 91)
- School: Canberra High School
- University: University of Oregon

Rugby union career
- Position: Wing
International career
Years	Team	Apps	(Points)
1957–1959	Australia	11	(9)

Alan Ridley Morton AM (10 September 1934 – 15 May 2026) was an Australian rugby union international player and leading sport scientist.

== Biography ==
Morton was born in Queanbeyan and attended Canberra High School.

A winger, Morton was the top try scorer in Sydney first-grade rugby in 1955 while playing with St. George. He repeated the feat the following season at his new club Randwick. Between 1957 and 1959, Morton was capped 11 times for the Wallabies. He had the distinction of being named one of "The Five Best Players of the Year" by the New Zealand Rugby Almanack in 1958 for his performances on that year's tour of New Zealand.

He left the country for Canada in 1960 to study at the University of British Columbia and play rugby for the Thunderbirds. He finished his degree at the University of Oregon. On his return to Australia, Morton-based himself in Perth and was captain-coach of Western Australia's interstate team.

An exercise physiologist, Morton was a long time academic at the University of Western Australia and in the 2001 Queen's Birthday Honours became a Member of the Order of Australia (AM) for services to sports science.

Morton died on 15 May 2026, at the age of 91.

== See also ==
- List of Australia national rugby union players
