= Robert Anderson (Australian Aboriginal elder) =

Australian Aboriginal elder and unionist

Robert Vincent Anderson OAM (born 31 July 1929) is an Australian Aboriginal elder and former union official.

Anderson, often referred to as Uncle Bob, is known for his long association with the Building Workers' Industrial Union of Australia where he was state organiser from 1951 to 1978. He is also an honorary member of the Construction, Forestry, Mining and Energy Union.

As a Ngugi elder from Mulgumpin in Quandamooka, Anderson has also served in various roles with an array of Indigenous organisations, working in the fields of reconciliation, native title, social justice, youth welfare and cultural identity.

In the 1960s, Anderson was a member of the Queensland Council for Advancement for Aborigines and Torres Strait Islanders. In 1999, he was appointed chair of the Aboriginal and Torres Strait Islander Advisory Board, a role he retired from in 2003.

== Recognition ==
In 1997, Anderson was awarded the Premier's Award for Seniors and was the South East Queensland Indigenous Elder of the Year in 1998.

He was awarded honorary doctorates from the Queensland University of Technology in 2000 and from Griffith University in 2002.

In 2001, Anderson was awarded the Centenary Medal for his distinguished service in promoting reconciliation, the Medal of the Order of Australia in the Queen's Birthday Honours for his service to Queensland's indigenous community, was one of the first five people to be named as Queensland Greats, and received Brisbane's Citizen of the Year Award.

A biography about Anderson, written by Christine Peacock, was published in 2001 entitled History, Life and Times of Robert Anderson Gheebelum, Ngugi, Mulgumpin: Community and Personal History of a Ngugi Elder of Mulgumpin in Quandamooka, South East Queensland, Australia.

Since 2010, the Queensland Council of Unions has given the Dr Robert (Uncle Bob) Anderson Award each year during annual NAIDOC Week celebrations to an indigenous activist who is credited with making an outstanding contribution to the union movement.

=== External links ===
Dr Robert Anderson OAM 'Uncle Bob' digital story and oral history: First Nations Elders oral history project : South East Queensland.
