= Australian Democrats =

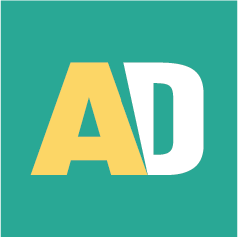
- Abbreviation: AD; AusDems
- President: Leonie Green
- Founder: Don Chipp
- Founded: 9 May 1977; 49 years ago
- Registered: 1984; 2016; 2019
- Merger of: Australia Party; New Liberal Movement; CountryMinded (2018) (Note: The party was de-registered in 2016. The Australian Democrats were re-registered to the Australian Electoral Commission in 2019 after merging with CountryMinded.)
- Split from: Liberal
- Headquarters: 15 Bassett Street, Nairne, South Australia 5252
- Youth wing: Young Democrats
- Ideology: Liberalism (Australian); Social liberalism; Environmentalism
- Political position: Centre
- Colours: Green; Gold
- Slogan: Keep the bastards honest
- City of Melbourne: 1 / 11
- Shire of Northern Grampians: 1 / 6
- House of Representatives: 0 / 150
- Senate: 0 / 76

Party flag

Website
- www.democrats.org.au

The Australian Democrats are a centrist political party in Australia. Founded in 1977 from a merger of the Australia Party and the New Liberal Movement, both of which were descended from Liberal Party splinter groups, it was Australia's largest minor party from its formation in 1977 through to 2004 and frequently held the balance of power in the Senate during that time.

The Democrats' inaugural leader was Don Chipp, a former Liberal cabinet minister, who famously promised to "keep the bastards honest". At the 1977 federal election, the Democrats polled 11.1 percent of the Senate vote and secured two seats. The party would retain a presence in the Senate for the next 30 years, winning seats in all six states and at its peak (between 1999 and 2002) holding nine out of 76 seats, though never securing a seat in the lower house. Due to the party's numbers in the Senate, both Liberal and Labor governments required the assistance of the Democrats to pass contentious legislation. Ideologically, the Democrats were usually regarded as centrists, occupying the political middle ground between the Liberal Party and the Labor Party.

Over three decades, the Australian Democrats also achieved representation in the legislatures of the ACT, South Australia, New South Wales, Western Australia and Tasmania. However, at the 2004 and 2007 federal elections, all seven of its Senate seats were lost as the party's share of the vote collapsed. The last remaining Democrat State parliamentarian, David Winderlich, left the party and was defeated as an independent in 2010.

The party was formally deregistered in 2016 for not having the required 500 members. In 2018 the Democrats merged with CountryMinded, a small, also unregistered agrarian political party. On 7 April 2019, the party regained registration with the Australian Electoral Commission.

In October 2026, the Australian Democrats were registered with the Victorian Electoral Commission to contest the 2026 Victorian state election. City of Melbourne councillor Andrew Rowse, and Northern Grampians Shire councillor and mayor Karen Hyslop subsequently joined the party.

== History ==
=== 1977–1986: Foundation and Don Chipp's leadership ===
The Australian Democrats were formed on 9 May 1977 from an amalgamation of the Australia Party and the New Liberal Movement. The two groups found a common basis for a new political movement in the widespread discontent with the two major parties. Former Liberal minister Don Chipp agreed to lead the new party.

The party's broad aim was to achieve a balance of power in one or more parliaments and to exercise it responsibly in line with policies determined by membership.

The first Australian Democrat parliamentarian was Robin Millhouse, the sole New LM member of the South Australian House of Assembly, who joined the Democrats in 1977. Millhouse held his seat (Mitcham) at the 1977 and 1979 state elections. In 1982, Millhouse resigned to take up a senior judicial appointment, and Heather Southcott won the by-election for the Democrats, but lost the seat to the Liberals later that year at the 1982 state election. Mitcham was the only single-member lower-house seat anywhere in Australia to be won by the Democrats.

The first Democrat federal parliamentarian was Senator Janine Haines, who in 1977 was nominated by the South Australian Parliament to fill the casual vacancy caused by the resignation of Liberal Senator Steele Hall. Hall had been elected as a Liberal Movement senator, before rejoining the Liberal Party in 1976, and South Australian premier Don Dunstan nominated Haines on the basis that the Democrats was the successor party to the Liberal Movement.

At the 1977 election, the Australian Democrats secured two seats in the Senate with the election of Colin Mason (NSW) and Don Chipp (VIC), though Haines lost her seat in South Australia. At the 1980 election, this increased to five seats with the election of Michael Macklin (QLD) and John Siddons (VIC) and the return of Janine Haines (SA). Thereafter they frequently held enough seats to give them the balance of power in the upper chamber.

At a Melbourne media conference on 19 September 1980, in the midst of the 1980 election campaign, Chipp described his party's aim as to "keep the bastards honest"—the "bastards" being the major parties or politicians in general. This became a long-lived slogan for the Democrats.

=== 1986–1990: Janine Haines' leadership ===
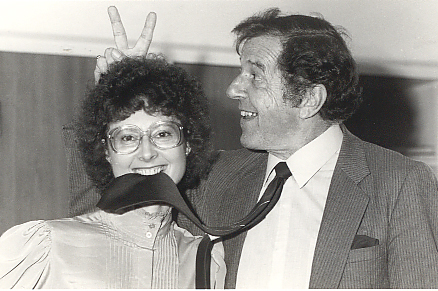
Janine Haines and Don Chipp, the first two leaders of the Australian Democrats

Don Chipp resigned from the Senate on 18 August 1986, being succeeded as party leader by Janine Haines and replaced as a senator for Victoria by Janet Powell.

At the 1987 election following a double dissolution, the reduced quota of 7.7% necessary to win a seat assisted the election of three new senators. Six-year terms were won by Paul McLean (NSW) and incumbents Janine Haines (South Australia) and Janet Powell (Victoria). In South Australia, a second senator, John Coulter, was elected for a three-year term, as were incumbent Michael Macklin (Queensland) and Jean Jenkins (Western Australia).

1990 saw the voluntary departure from the Senate of Janine Haines (a step with which not all Democrats agreed) and the failure of her strategic goal of winning the House of Representatives seat of Kingston. The casual vacancy was filled by Meg Lees several months before the election of Cheryl Kernot in place of retired deputy leader Michael Macklin. The ambitious Kernot immediately contested the party's national parliamentary deputy leadership. Being unemployed at the time, she requested and obtained party funds to pay for her travel to address members in all seven divisions. In the event, Victorian Janet Powell was elected as leader and John Coulter was chosen as deputy leader.

=== 1990–1993: Janet Powell and John Coulter ===
Despite the loss of Haines and the WA Senate seat (through an inconsistent national preference agreement with the ALP), the 1990 federal election heralded something of a rebirth for the party, with a dramatic rise in primary vote. This was at the same time as an economic recession was building, and events such as the Gulf War in Kuwait were beginning to shepherd issues of globalisation and transnational trade on to national government agendas. The Australian Democrats had a long-standing policy to oppose war and so opposed Australia's support of, and participation in, the Gulf War. Whereas the House of Representatives was able to avoid any debate about the war and Australia's participation, (Note: The sole independent member in the House, Ted Mack, was unable to launch his critical motion for lack of a seconder.) the Democrats took full advantage of the opportunity to move for a debate in the Senate.

Because of the party's pacifist-based opposition to the Gulf War, there was mass-media antipathy and negative publicity which some construed as poor media performance by Janet Powell, the party's standing having stalled at about 10%. Before 12 months of her leadership had passed, the South Australian and Queensland divisions were circulating the party's first-ever petition to criticise and oust the parliamentary leader. The explicit grounds related to Powell's alleged responsibility for poor AD ratings in Gallup and other media surveys of potential voting support. When this charge was deemed insufficient, interested party officers and senators reinforced it with negative media 'leaks' concerning her openly established relationship with Sid Spindler and exposure of administrative failings resulting in excessive overtime to a staff member. With National Executive blessing, the party room pre-empted the ballot by replacing the leader with deputy John Coulter. In the process, severe internal divisions were generated. One major collateral casualty was the party whip Paul McLean who resigned and quit the Senate in disgust at what he perceived as in-fighting between close friends. The casual NSW vacancy created by his resignation was filled by Karin Sowada. Powell duly left the party, along with many leading figures of the Victorian branch of the party, and unsuccessfully stood as an Independent candidate when her term expired. In later years, she campaigned for the Australian Greens.

=== 1993–1997: Cheryl Kernot ===
The party's parliamentary influence was weakened in 1996 after the Howard government was elected, and a Labor senator, Mal Colston, resigned from the Labor Party. Since the Democrats now shared the parliamentary balance of power with two Independent senators, the Coalition government was able on occasion to pass legislation by negotiating with Colston and Brian Harradine.

In October 1997, party leader Cheryl Kernot resigned, announcing that she would be joining the Australian Labor Party. (Five years later it was revealed that she had been in a sexual relationship with Labor deputy leader Gareth Evans). Kernot resigned from the Senate and was replaced by Andrew Bartlett, while deputy Meg Lees became the new party leader.

=== 1997–2004: Meg Lees, Natasha Stott Despoja and Andrew Bartlett ===
Under Lees' leadership, in the 1998 federal election, the Democrats' candidate John Schumann came within 2 per cent of taking Liberal Foreign Minister Alexander Downer's seat of Mayo in the Adelaide Hills under Australia's preferential voting system. The party's representation increased to nine senators, and they regained the balance of power, holding it until the Coalition gained a Senate majority at the 2004 election.

Internal conflict and leadership tensions from 2000 to 2002, blamed on the party's support for the Government's Goods and Services Tax, was damaging to the Democrats. Opposed by the Labor Party, the Australian Greens and independent Senator Harradine, the tax required Democrat support to pass. In an election fought on tax, the Democrats publicly stated that they liked neither the Liberal's nor the Labor's tax packages, but pledged to work with whichever party was elected to make theirs better. They campaigned with the slogan "No Goods and Services Tax on Food".

In 1999, after negotiations with Prime Minister Howard, Meg Lees, Andrew Murray and the party room senators agreed to support the A New Tax System legislation with exemptions from goods and services tax for most food and some medicines, as well as many environmental and social concessions. Five Australian Democrats senators voted in favour. However, two dissident senators on the party's left, Natasha Stott Despoja and Andrew Bartlett, voted against the GST.

The decision to pass the GST was opposed by the majority of the Democrats' members, and in 2001 a leadership spill saw Lees replaced as leader by Stott Despoja after a very public and bitter leadership battle. Despite criticism of Stott Despoja's youth and lack of experience, the 2001 election saw the Democrats receive similar media coverage to the previous election. Despite the internal divisions, the Australian Democrats' election result in 2001 was quite good. However, it was not enough to prevent the loss of Vicki Bourne's Senate seat in NSW.

The 2002 South Australian election was the last time an Australian Democrat would be elected to an Australian parliament. Sandra Kanck was re-elected to a second eight-year term from an upper house primary vote of 7.3 percent.

Resulting tensions between Stott Despoja and Lees led to Meg Lees leaving the party in 2002, becoming an independent and forming the Australian Progressive Alliance. Stott Despoja stood down from the leadership following a loss of confidence by her party room colleagues. It led to a protracted leadership battle in 2002, which eventually led to the election of Senator Andrew Bartlett as leader. While the public fighting stopped, the public support for the party remained at record lows.

On 6 December 2003, Bartlett stepped aside temporarily as leader of the party, after an incident in which he swore at Liberal Senator Jeannie Ferris on the floor of Parliament while intoxicated. The party issued a statement stating that deputy leader Lyn Allison would serve as the acting leader of the party. Bartlett apologised to the Democrats, Jeannie Ferris and the Australian public for his behaviour and assured all concerned that it would never happen again. On 29 January 2004, after seeking medical treatment, Bartlett returned to the Australian Democrats leadership, vowing to abstain from alcohol.

=== Decline ===
Following internal conflict over the goods and services tax and resultant leadership changes, a dramatic decline occurred in the Democrats' membership and voting support in all states. Simultaneously, an increase was recorded in support for the Australian Greens who, by 2004, were supplanting the Democrats as a substantial third party. The trend was noted that year by political scientists Dean Jaensch et al.

Support for the Australian Democrats fell significantly at the 2004 federal election in which they achieved only 2.4 per cent of the national vote. Nowhere was this more noticeable than in their key support base of suburban Adelaide in South Australia, where they received between 1 and 4 percent of the lower house vote; by comparison, they tallied between 7 and 31 per cent of the vote in 2001. No Democrat senators were elected, though four kept their seats due to being elected in 2001, thus their representation fell from eight senators to four. Three incumbent senators were defeated: Aden Ridgeway (NSW), Brian Greig (WA) and John Cherry (Qld). Following the loss, the customary post-election leadership ballot installed Allison as leader, with Bartlett as her deputy. From 1 July 2005 the Australian Democrats lost official parliamentary party status, being represented by only four senators while the governing Liberal-National Coalition gained a majority and potential control of the Senate—the first time this advantage had been enjoyed by any government since 1980.

On 28 August 2006, the founder of the Australian Democrats, Don Chipp, died. Former prime minister Bob Hawke said: "... there is a coincidental timing almost between the passing of Don Chipp and what I think is the death throes of the Democrats." In November 2006, the Australian Democrats fared very poorly in the Victorian state election, receiving a Legislative Council vote tally of only 0.83%, less than half of the party's result in 2002 (1.79 per cent).

The Democrats again had no success at the 2007 federal election, and lost all four of their remaining Senate seats. Two incumbent senators, Lyn Allison (Victoria) and Andrew Bartlett (Queensland), were defeated, their seats both reverting to major parties. Their two remaining colleagues, Andrew Murray (WA) and Natasha Stott Despoja (SA), retired. All four senators' terms expired on 30 June 2008—leaving the Australian Democrats with no federal representation for the first time since its founding in 1977. Later, in 2009, Jaensch suggested it was possible the Democrats could make a political comeback at the 2010 South Australian election, but this did not occur.

==== State and territory losses ====
The Tasmanian division of the party was deregistered for having insufficient members in January 2006.

At the 2006 South Australian election, the Australian Democrats were reduced to 1.7 per cent of the Legislative Council (upper house) vote. Their sole councillor up for re-election, Kate Reynolds, was defeated. In July 2006, Richard Pascoe, national and South Australian party president, resigned, citing slumping opinion polls and the poor result in the 2006 South Australian election as well as South Australian parliamentary leader Sandra Kanck's comments regarding the drug MDMA which he saw as damaging to the party.

In the New South Wales state election of March 2007, the Australian Democrats lost their last remaining NSW Upper House representative, Arthur Chesterfield-Evans. The party fared poorly, gaining only 1.8 per cent of the Legislative Council vote.

On 13 September 2007, the ACT Democrats (Australian Capital Territory Division of the party) was deregistered by the ACT Electoral Commissioner, being unable to demonstrate a minimum membership of 100 electors.

These losses left Sandra Kanck, in South Australia, as the party's only parliamentarian. She retired in 2009 and was replaced by David Winderlich, making him (as of 2020) the last Democrat to sit in any Australian parliament. The Democrats lost all representation when Winderlich resigned from the party in October 2009. He sat the remainder of his term as an independent, and lost his seat at the 2010 South Australian election.

==== Post-parliamentary decline ====
Following the loss of all Democrats MPs in both federal and state parliaments, the party continued to be riven by factionalism. In 2009 a dispute arose between two factions, the "Christian Centrists" loyal to former leader Meg Lees, and a faction comprising the party's more progressive members. The dispute arose when the Christian Centrist controlled national executive removed a website for party members from the internet, stating that its operation was a violation of the party constitution. In response, the progressive faction accused the national executive of being undemocratic and of acting contrary to the party constitution themselves. By 2012, this dispute had been superseded by another between members loyal to former Senator Brian Greig and members who were supporters of former South Australian MP Sandra Kanck. Brian Greig was elected the party's president, but resigned after less than a month due to frustration with the party's factionalism.

==== Deregistration ====
On 16 April 2015, the Australian Electoral Commission deregistered the Australian Democrats as a political party for failure to demonstrate the requisite 500 members to maintain registration. However, the party did run candidates and remain registered for a period of time thereafter in the New South Wales Democrats and Queensland Democrat divisions.

=== Renewed registration ===
In November 2018 there was a report that CountryMinded, a de-registered microparty, would merge with the Australian Democrats in a new bid to seek membership growth, electoral re-registration and financial support. In February 2019, application for registration was submitted to the AEC and was upheld on 7 April 2019, despite an objection from the Australian Democrats (Queensland Division).

The party unsuccessfully contested the lower-house seat of Adelaide and a total of six Senate seats (two in each state of New South Wales, Victoria and South Australia) at the 2019 federal election. At the 2022 federal election one lower-house seat (Eden-Monaro) and three Senate seats were contested without success, polling fewer than 0.7% of first-preference votes.

The party polled fewer than 1.4% of first preference votes in the 2024 Dunkley by-election.

Return to Victorian politics

In 2026, the party regained registration with the Victorian Electoral Commission, having last contested a Victorian state election in 2006. City of Melbourne councillor Andrew Rowse and former Victorian Legislative Council member Andy Meddick subsequently joined the party, with both standing as candidates for the Legislative Council at the 2026 Victorian State Election.

== Overview ==
The party was founded on principles of honesty, tolerance, compassion and direct democracy through postal ballots of all members, so that "there should be no hierarchical structure ... by which a carefully engineered elite could make decisions for the members." From the outset, members' participation was fiercely protected in national and divisional constitutions prescribing internal elections, regular meeting protocols, annual conferences—and monthly journals for open discussion and balloting. Dispute resolution procedures were established, with final recourse to a party ombudsman and membership ballot.

Policies determined by the unique participatory method promoted environmental awareness and sustainability, opposition to the primacy of economic rationalism (Australian neoliberalism), preventative approaches to human health and welfare, animal rights, rejection of nuclear technology and weapons.

The Australian Democrats were the first representatives of green politics at the federal level in Australia. They "were in the vanguard of environmentalism in Australia. From the early 1980s they were unequivocally opposed to the building of the Franklin Dam in Tasmania and they opposed the mining and export of uranium and the development of nuclear power plants in Australia." In particular, leader Don Chipp, and Tasmanian state Democrat Norm Sanders, played crucial legislative roles in preventing the damming of the Franklin River.

The party's centrist role made it subject to criticism from both the right and left of the political spectrum. In particular, Chipp's former conservative affiliation was frequently recalled by opponents on the left. (Note: Such as the then Socialist Workers' Party and early green-left parties such as the United Tasmania Group.) This problem was to torment later leaders and strategists who, by 1991, were proclaiming "the electoral objective" as a higher priority than the rigorous participatory democracy espoused by the party's founders. (Note: The first substantive reason given by rebellious senators for deposing leader Janet Powell in 1991 was her alleged failure to develop a media profile which would attract more electoral support. The first conclusive constitutional abandonment of founding principles was probably the July 1993 decision of the party's national executive to terminate monthly publication of the members' National Journal and to replace it with less frequent publication of glossy promotional material.)

Because of their numbers on the cross benches during the Hawke and Keating governments, the Democrats were sometimes regarded as exercising a balance of power—which attracted electoral support from a significant sector of the electorate which had been alienated by both Labor and Coalition policies and practices.

== Electoral results ==
Senate
Election year	# of overall votes	% of overall vote	# of seats won	# of overall seats	+/–	Notes
1977	823,550	11.13 (#3)	2 / 34	2 / 64	▲2	
1980	711,805	9.25 (#3)	3 / 34	5 / 64	▲2	Shared balance of power
1983 (D-D)	764,911	9.57 (#3)	5 / 64	5 / 64	0	Shared balance of power
1984	677,970	7.62 (#3)	5 / 46	7 / 76	▲2	Sole balance of power
1987 (D-D)	794,107	8.47 (#3)	7 / 76	7 / 76	0	Sole balance of power
1990	1,253,807	12.63 (#3)	5 / 40	8 / 76	▲1	Sole balance of power
1993	566,944	5.31 (#3)	2 / 40	7 / 76	▼1	Shared balance of power
1996	1,179,357	10.82 (#3)	5 / 40	7 / 76	0	Shared balance of power
1998	947,940	8.45 (#4)	4 / 40	9 / 76	▲2	Sole balance of power
2001	843,130	7.25 (#3)	4 / 40	8 / 76	▼1	Shared balance of power
2004	250,373	2.09 (#4)	0 / 40	4 / 76	▼4	
2007	162,975	1.29 (#5)	0 / 40	0 / 76	▼4	
2010	80,645	0.63 (#10)	0 / 40	0 / 76	0	
2013	33,907	0.25 (#23)	0 / 40	0 / 76	0	
2016 (D-D)	0	N/A	0 / 76	0 / 76	0	Did not contest
2019	24,992	0.17 (#32)	0 / 40	0 / 76	0	
2022	49,489	0.44 (#17)	0 / 40	0 / 76	0	
2025	37,734	0.24 (#25)	0 / 40	0 / 76	0	

== Leaders ==
#	Leader	State	Start	End	Time in office	Election(s)
1	Don Chipp (Note: Assumed the leadership following the party's creation, subsequently confirmed as leader via a postal ballot of party members.)	VIC	9 May 1977	18 August 1986	9 years, 101 days	1977, 1980, 1983, 1984
2	Janine Haines (Note: Elected leader following the retirement of Don Chipp, defeating John Siddons in a postal ballot of party members.)	SA	18 August 1986	24 March 1990	3 years, 218 days	1987, 1990
–	Michael Macklin (Note: Interim leader (elected by caucus) following the resignation of Janine Haines. Haines relinquished leadership when she resigned from the Senate on 1 March 1990 to (unsuccessfully) contest the lower-house seat of Kingston at the 1990 federal election.)	QLD	24 March 1990	30 June 1990	0 years, 98 days	none
3	Janet Powell (Note: Elected leader via a postal ballot of party members, defeating John Coulter.)	VIC	1 July 1990	19 August 1991	1 year, 49 days	none
4	John Coulter (Note: Initially interim leader (elected by caucus) following the removal of Janet Powell. Confirmed as leader on 2 October 1991 via a postal ballot of party members.)	SA	19 August 1991	29 April 1993	1 year, 209 days	1993
5	Cheryl Kernot (Note: Elected leader via a postal ballot of party members, replacing John Coulter in a mandatory vote following the 1993 election.)	QLD	29 April 1993	15 October 1997	4 years, 169 days	1996
6	Meg Lees (Note: Initially interim leader (elected by caucus) following the resignation of Cheryl Kernot. Confirmed as leader on 5 December 1997 via a postal ballot of party members, defeating Lyn Allison. Kernot had resigned to join the Labor Party, and was subsequently elected to the House of Representatives.)	SA	15 October 1997	6 April 2001	3 years, 173 days	1998
7	Natasha Stott Despoja (Note: Elected leader via a postal ballot of party members, defeating Meg Lees.)	SA	6 April 2001	21 August 2002	1 year, 137 days	2001
–	Brian Greig (Note: Interim leader (elected by caucus) following the resignation of Natasha Stott Despoja.)	WA	23 August 2002	5 October 2002	0 years, 43 days	none
8	Andrew Bartlett (Note: Elected leader via a postal ballot of members, defeating interim leader Brian Greig.)	QLD	5 October 2002	3 November 2004	2 years, 29 days	2004
9	Lyn Allison (Note: Elected leader unopposed following the resignation of Andrew Bartlett.)	VIC	3 November 2004	30 June 2008	3 years, 240 days	2007

== See also ==
- Social liberalism
- Liberalism worldwide
- List of liberal parties
- Liberal democracy
- Teal independents
- Timeline of (small-l) liberal parties in Australia
- List of political parties in Australia
