= Bruce Chapman (Australian economist) =

Australian economist and academic

Bruce Chapman AO
- Born: 16 September 1951 (age 75); Canberra, Australia
- Education: Australian National University; Yale University
- Occupations: Economics professor University academic
- Employer(s): Australian National University; Research School of Economics
- Known for: Father/architect of the HECS system
- Awards: Officer of the Order of Australia (AO)
- Website: brucejchapman.com

Bruce James Chapman AO (born 16 September 1951) is an Australian economist and academic known for being the founder or architect of the HECS system. HECS is the Higher Education Contribution Scheme loans system. He was a professor at the College of Business and Economics, Australian National University. In 2001, he became a Member of the Order of Australia (AM), "for service to the development of Australian economic, labour market and social policy". In 2017, Chapman was appointed the inaugural Sir Roland Wilson Chair of Economics.

== Education ==
He was awarded a Bachelor of Economics at the Australian National University for his undergraduate degree. He earned his PhD in Economics from Yale University.

== Career ==
In 1989, the Australian Federal Government led by Bob Hawke introduced the Higher Education Contributions Scheme (HECS), which was first intimated by Murray Wells. Chapman further developed the policy with the support of the Education Minister John Dawkins, as part of the Dawkins Revolution. He was also an advisor to the Keating government in 1994–96.

In the original HECS, an $1,800 fee was charged to all university students, and the Commonwealth Government footed the bill. It was a first of its kind loan scheme that used the tax system to collect repayments. The scheme has influenced other countries like the United Kingdom, Ghana, New Zealand and Hungary to introduce their own model of a higher education contribution scheme.

Since then he worked with governments on policies such as the Working Nation and the 2010 changes to Youth Allowance. The Abbott Liberal government came into power in 2013, and tried to introduced reforms into the higher education sector. This included fee deregulation which Chapman has expressed concerns about as it allows universities to raise fees in excess to the cost of teaching students. If the federal government does decide to uncap fees, he proposes a mechanism of capping of fee increases whereby the government subsidies tapers off when fee increases breaches a certain level.

In 1993, Chapman was elected the Academy of the Social Sciences of Australia.

In 2017, Chapman was appointed the inaugural Sir Roland Wilson Chair of Economics; a foundation established in 1998 in the name of one of Australia's most prominent economist and public servants, Roland Wilson.

== Publications ==
- “Student loan reforms for German higher education: Financing tuition fees” (with Mathias Sinning) (2014), Education Economics.
- “Revenue Forgone from Unpaid HECS When Graduates go Overseas to Work” (with Tim Higgins), (forthcoming 2013), Australian Economic Review.
- “What’s love got to do with it? Homogenous preferences and dyadic approaches to understanding marital instability” (with Rebecca Kippen, Peng Yu and Kiatanantha Lounkaew, (forthcoming, 2013), Journal of Population Research).
- “How many Jobs is 23,510, really?” (with Kiatanantha Lounkaew) (forthcoming, 2013), Australian Journal of Labour Economics.
- “Introduction” (with Kiatanantha Lounkaew) (forthcoming, 2013), Economics of Education Review (Special Issue on Education Policy).
- “Repayment burdens with Vietnamese student loan policy” (with Amy Liu) (forthcoming, 2013), Economics of Education Review (Special Issue on Education Policy).
