= Andrew Bartlett =

Australian politician (born 1964)

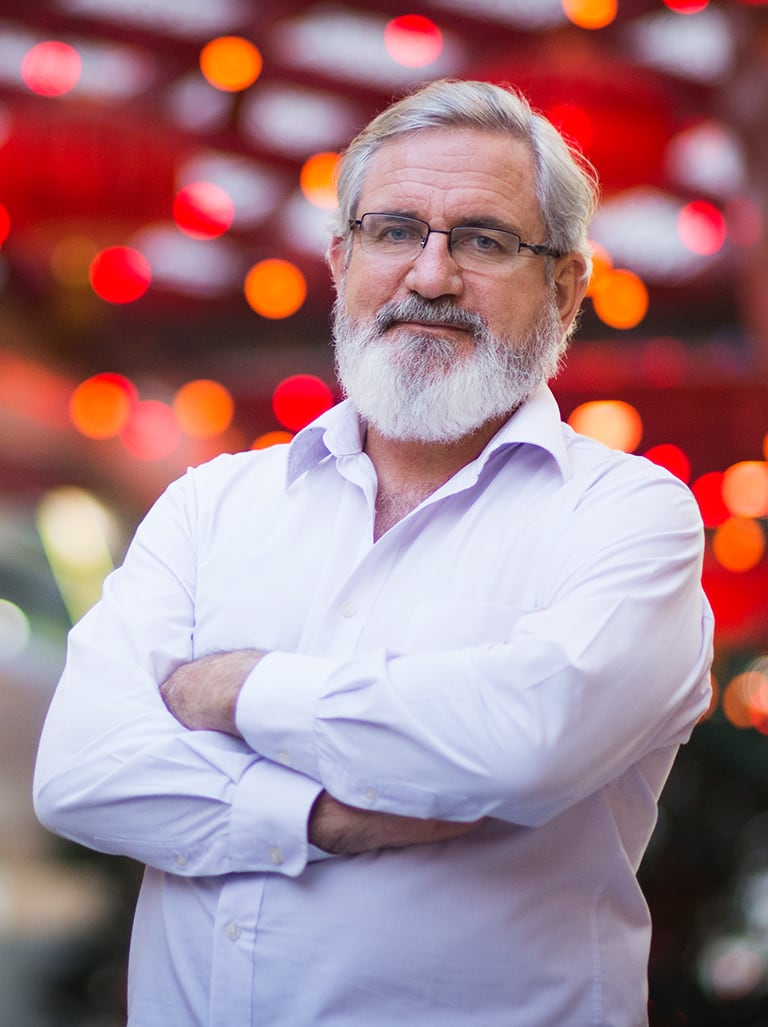
- Bartlett in 2019

Senator for Queensland
- In office 10 November 2017 – 27 August 2018
- Preceded by: Larissa Waters
- Succeeded by: Larissa Waters
- In office 30 October 1997 – 30 June 2008
- Preceded by: Cheryl Kernot

Leader of the Australian Democrats
- In office 5 October 2002 – 3 November 2004
- Deputy: Lyn Allison
- Preceded by: Brian Greig
- Succeeded by: Lyn Allison

Deputy Leader of the Australian Democrats
- In office 3 November 2004 – 30 June 2008
- Leader: Lyn Allison
- Preceded by: Lyn Allison
- Succeeded by: none

Personal details
- Born: Andrew John Julian Bartlett; 4 August 1964 (age 62) Brisbane, Queensland, Australia
- Party: Greens (since 2009); Democrats (to 2009)
- Children: 1
- Education: St Columban's College, Caboolture
- Alma mater: University of Queensland
- Occupation: Social worker (Department of Social Security)
- Profession: Public servant Politician

Andrew John Julian Bartlett (born 4 August 1964) is an Australian politician, social worker, academic, and social campaigner who served as a Senator for Queensland from 1997 to 2008 and from 2017 to 2018. He represented the Australian Democrats in his first stint in the Senate, including as party leader from 2002 to 2004 and deputy leader from 2004 to 2008. In November 2017, he returned to the Senate as a member of the Australian Greens, replacing Larissa Waters after her disqualification during the parliamentary eligibility crisis. He resigned from the Senate in August 2018 in an unsuccessful attempt to win the House of Representatives seat of Brisbane, allowing Waters to fill his seat in advance of the 2019 election.

== Early life ==
Bartlett was born in Brisbane on 4 August 1964. He is of Irish, Swiss, English and Greek descent – his great-great-grandfather, who is claimed to be the first Greek settler in Australia, arrived in Adelaide in 1840.

Bartlett holds the degrees of Bachelor of Arts and Bachelor of Social Work from the University of Queensland. He worked for a community radio station from 1985 to 1986 and later as a social worker. He then worked as an electorate officer for Queensland Democrats senators Cheryl Kernot and John Woodley between 1990 and 1997.

== Political career ==
=== Entry into politics ===
Bartlett has campaigned for gay rights. In 2004, he cried in the Senate chamber over a proposed law to define marriage as between a man and a woman, which he called an "absolute disgrace".

=== Leader of the Australian Democrats ===
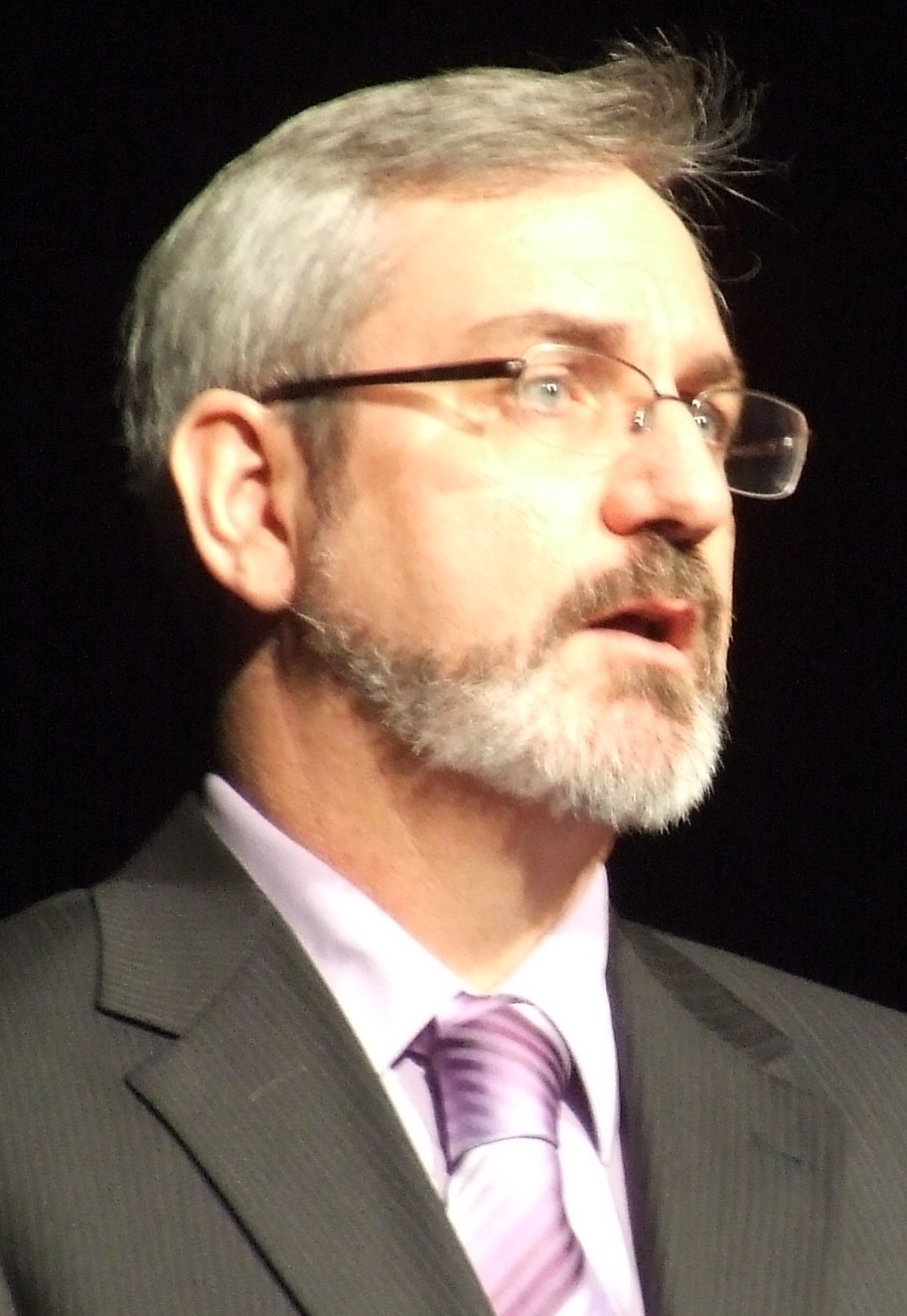
Bartlett speaking as Deputy Leader of the Democrats in 2007

After the resignation of party leader Natasha Stott Despoja on 21 August 2002, Bartlett was elected as her replacement on 5 October 2002, defeating the temporary leader Brian Greig.

To a degree, Bartlett stabilised the Democrats' troubled party room and spoke strongly against the Government's maltreatment of refugees and maladministration of the Department of Immigration. He also oversaw the Democrat senators' use of their potential balance of power role to influence increased funding for Medicare, protection of the welfare payments of sole parents, the unemployed and the disabled, and entitlement of some homosexual couples to superannuation entitlements equivalent to those enjoyed by heterosexual couples.

In December 2003, Bartlett resigned his Senate leadership. Accused by Liberal Senator Jeannie Ferris of physically and verbally abusing her when she confronted him upon leaving the Senate chamber after a vote, Bartlett gave her an unreserved apology. He admitted to abusing and manhandling the Senator. Bartlett, who had been drinking at a Liberal Party function held just outside the chamber, was accused of stealing five bottles of wine from the function. Some time after Ferris had retrieved the wine, Bartlett approached Ferris, and was alleged to have gripped her arm and verbally abused her, both inside the chamber and along the way to an outside courtyard. Parliamentary video of part of the incident appeared to show that Bartlett was drunk in the chamber. Bartlett's subsequent formal apology was accompanied by a bottle of wine, which Ferris described as "quite inappropriate ... as an apology for drunken behaviour involving abuse and a physical attack." By contrast, Liberal Senator Brett Mason, who witnessed the incident, said "Perhaps a little more was made of the incident than should have been made. I think it was overplayed by the media, and by everyone." Labor Senator Claire Moore was reported in The Bulletin magazine as saying Bartlett had been "unfairly demonized."

Bartlett resumed the party's parliamentary leadership in January 2004, giving an assurance that he would totally abstain from alcohol. However, the party's support levels remained at the same low level to which they had fallen at the time of Stott Despoja's resignation. He was unable to increase the party's support leading up to the 2004 election in which the Democrats were defending three Senate seats. All three seats were lost—one going to the Greens and two to Liberals. The party polled what was at the time the lowest vote since their inception in 1977.

=== Departure from the Democrats and Greens candidacy ===
Following the 2004 election, Bartlett did not re-contest the leadership, instead taking on the deputy leadership under Lyn Allison. Bartlett was defeated at the 2007 election, polling only 1.88% of the primary vote in Queensland. The Democrat vote was even lower in other states, and the party lost all its remaining Senate seats. He left the Senate at the expiration of his term in June 2008.

Bartlett addressing the 2014 March in May rally in Brisbane. Video: Patrick Gillett

In November 2009, Greens leader Bob Brown announced that Bartlett would contest the lower house seat of Brisbane at the 2010 federal election as a candidate for the Australian Greens. Bartlett came third in the seat in the 2010 election, gaining 21.3% of the vote with a swing to the Greens of just over 10%.

This was not the first time that Bartlett contested Brisbane and against the sitting Labor member Arch Bevis. Bartlett had first contested Brisbane in 1996 for the Australian Democrats when he received 9.04% of the vote.

In May 2012, Bartlett ran for the Lord Mayoralty of Brisbane for the Greens, receiving 10.7% of the primary vote, a 2.3% increase on the previous election.

In 2015, years after the Democrats' parliamentary oblivion, the party was deregistered by the Australian Electoral Commission. Speaking as a former Democrats leader, Bartlett reflected that the party's support of the Howard Government's introduction of the GST was "politically catastrophic", but the "last straw" for the party was the demise of Stott Despoja as leader in 2002:

Even though the Democrats eventually disappeared from parliament in 2008, basically our political support crashed and burned in 2002.

— Andrew Bartlett, 2015

Bartlett was again endorsed by the Greens as a Senate candidate for Queensland at the 2016 federal election. While he did not meet the quota for election, his colleague Senator Larissa Waters resigned her position on 18 July 2017 after discovering she held dual Australian and Canadian citizenship. She was ruled ineligible on 27 October 2017. As the second person on the 2016 Australian Greens Senate ticket, he replaced her after a recount. After his election was announced on 10 November, Bartlett was sworn in as a Senator for Queensland on 12 November 2017. Despite stirrings of a pre-selection showdown between himself and Waters for the next Senate election, Bartlett announced on 9 February 2018 that he would not seek to remain in the Senate, opting to seek pre-selection for the Queensland seat of Brisbane in the House of Representatives instead. On 16 June 2018, Bartlett announced that he would resign from the Senate at the end of August, to be replaced by Waters. The resignation was formally submitted to the Senate President Scott Ryan on 27 August 2018.

As announced, Bartlett contested the Division of Brisbane in the House of Representatives at the 2019 federal election receiving 22% of first preferences. Despite not winning the seat, he brought the Greens vote to its highest ever percentage in the Brisbane electorate, falling short of entering the two-party preferred vote behind Labor in second place, at 24.49%. The Australian Greens would go on to win this seat with first time candidate Stephen Bates in 2022, before losing it to the Australian Labor Party in 2025.

Bartlett contested the Electoral district of Clayfield in the Legislative Assembly of Queensland at the 2020 Queensland state election and received 17.61% of the vote.

== Personal life ==
Bartlett is active on animal rights and human rights issues. After departing parliament, Bartlett took up a position as a part-time Research Fellow with the Migration Law Program at the Australian National University.

Bartlett has since returned to being an announcer at 4ZZZ, and was also Chair of the Board of Directors of 4ZZZ from 2014 until 2017. He occasionally writes pieces for websites such as Crikey, New Matilda, The Drum and Online Opinion. During Mental Health Week 2013, Bartlett wrote an article for the Courier-Mail about his being hospitalised for depression in 2012.

He has one daughter, Lillith.

Party political offices
| Preceded by Brian Greig (interim) | Leader of the Australian Democrats; 2002–2004 | Succeeded by Lyn Allison |
