= Brian Greig =

Australian politician (born 1966)

Brian Greig OAM
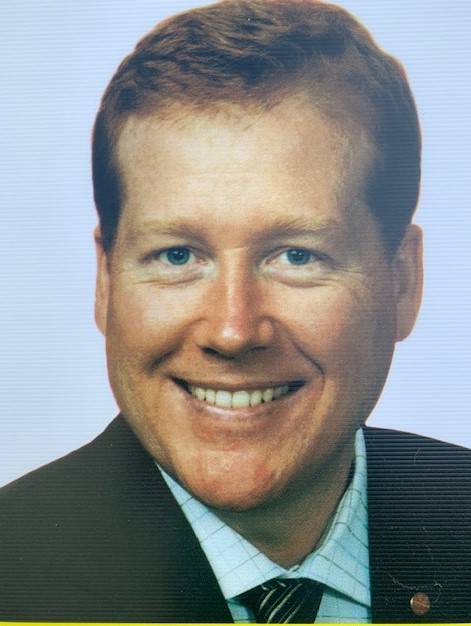

Leader of the Australian Democrats Interim
- In office 22 August 2002 – 5 October 2002
- Deputy: Aden Ridgeway
- Preceded by: Natasha Stott Despoja
- Succeeded by: Andrew Bartlett

Senator for Western Australia
- In office 1 July 1999 – 30 June 2005
- Preceded by: Dee Margetts
- Succeeded by: Rachel Siewert

Personal details
- Born: Brian Andrew Greig; 22 February 1966 (age 60) Fremantle, Western Australia, Australia
- Party: Democrat
- Domestic partner(s): Keith McKenzie (esp. 1986)
- Education: Hale School
- Alma mater: Murdoch University
- Occupation: Media officer (Self-employed)
- Profession: Journalist; Politician

Brian Andrew Greig OAM (born 22 February 1966) is a former Australian politician. Grieg was an Australian Democrats member of the Australian Senate from 1999 to 2005, representing the state of Western Australia.

== Early life ==
Greig was born in Fremantle, but his family moved to the small crayfishing village of Lancelin in 1970. He went to primary school there, but received secondary education as a boarder at Hale School, Perth. He studied Arts (English Literature) at Murdoch University, where he became involved in student politics and editor of student newspaper ‘Metior’. He was elected to the Guild in 1988.

At university, Greig campaigned on the issue of student fees and, in 1986, helped re-establish the National Union of Students. He also began to get involved in gay rights activism during the 1990s, and for several years was spokesperson for Gay and Lesbian Equality (GALE), campaigning for the decriminalisation of homosexuality, anti-discrimination protections and partnership recognition for same-sex couples.

Greig also helped establish the now defunct Australian Council for Lesbian and Gay Rights in 1993, the first national lobby of its kind focused on discriminatory commonwealth laws. Campaigns included the successful lifting of the homosexual ban in the military, and recognition of same-sex partners' right to carer's and bereavement leave.

== Political career ==
During the 1990s, Greig worked for a range of Australian Labor Party politicians, including Senator Peter Cook, Diana Warnock MLA and Opposition Leaders Ian Taylor MLA and Dr Carmen Lawrence MLA, but became disillusioned with Labor and joined the Democrats. He cited Labor's ‘weak’ commitment to LGBTI reform and was attracted to the work in this area by Democrats Senator Sid Spindler, at that time creating on a commonwealth Sexual Orientation and Gender Identity (SOGI) Bill.

Between 1995 and 1999, he was a local-government councillor in the City of Vincent, becoming the first openly gay person elected to public office in Western Australia. At the October 1998 federal election, aged 33, Greig was elected to the Senate. He used his maiden speech to acknowledge his homosexuality, highlight existing areas of discrimination and called for a range of national reforms in this area. It is considered to be the first time a federal politician had spoken so openly and strongly in favour of LGBTI rights, and Grieg has been considered the first LGBTI rights activist elected to federal parliament.

In August 2002, Greig became interim leader of the Australian Democrats for six weeks following the ousting of former leader Natasha Stott Despoja by senators including the party's deputy, Aden Ridgeway. Ridgeway was expected to become the interim leader, though Greig, a supporter of Despoja, made a late challenge appealing to the Democrats governing National Executive to appoint him instead. Greig has been considered to be the first openly gay leader of an Australian political party. Greig was replaced in the resulting leadership ballot by Andrew Bartlett in October, 2002.

In the Senate, Greig had Democrat portfolio responsibilities for Attorney Generals, Justice and Customs; Family and Community Services; Transport; Resources; Fisheries; Disability and Sexuality Issues. He campaigned against internet censorship, and also served on the Joint Parliamentary Committee for the Australian Crime Commission and prompted it to investigate the trafficking of women into the Australian sex industry.

Greig is mostly remembered for his pursuit of LGBTI issues, raising questions with Ministers, moving same-sex amendments to government legislation and triggering speeches from all parties on how to remedy commonwealth inequality against same-sex couples. In 2003, the conservative Howard Government which had opposed his agenda, reluctantly agreed to one of his campaigns and ended discrimination against same-sex couples in private sector Superannuation death benefits. Along with Spindler's SOGI Bill, his advocacy across all areas of federal LGBTI discrimination has been credited with laying the foundations for the Rudd Government's ‘Same-Sex Relationships (Equal Treatment in Commonwealth Laws General Law Reform) Bill 2008.

In 2004, just prior to the election being called, Greig was one of only nine senators to vote against the ban on same-sex marriage by the Howard Government. That legislation triggered a movement for marriage equality that would last another 13 years. The ban was overturned in 2017 and Greig's pioneering speech and advocacy from 2004 was acknowledged by sitting senators and referenced in the media.

During his term in office, Greig introduced three Private Member's Bills — one to outlaw genocide in Australia, another to eliminate discrimination against LGBTI people, and another to promote government use of open source software. All were blocked by the Liberal–National government. Greig stood for re-election at the 2004 election, but lost his seat to Rachel Siewert of the Australian Greens. His term expired 30 June 2005.

== Post-political career ==
Since leaving parliament, Greig has worked as a Communications Manager for the Real Estate Institute of Western Australia and in media operations for Anglicare WA and the Department of Fire and Emergency Services. He continues with social commentary in platforms such as On Line Opinion and Crikey, as well as publishing articles in mainstream media including for The Age and The Guardian.

Greig maintained his LGBTI advocacy, serving as the WA Representative to Australian Marriage Equality between 2013 and 2016 and is currently WA spokesperson for lobby group Just-Equal Australia. On 13 June 2011, Greig was awarded the Medal of the Order of Australia for service to the community as a social justice advocate for the gay and lesbian community.

In 2019, Greig moved to Busselton WA. That year, he unsuccessfully stood for Busselton City Council in 2019. He is self-employed in consulting and works for the hospitality sector. He is chairperson of local LGBTI advocacy group Busselton Pride Alliance, and is also a founding member of the LGBTIQ advocacy group Just-Equal Australia.
