= Doug Hall (art curator) =

Australian art curator and historian

Doug Hall AM
- Born: 1954 (age 71–72); Morwell, Victoria, Australia
- Education: Victorian College of the Arts
- Occupation: art curator
- Known for: Serving twenty years as director of the Queensland Art Gallery

Douglas Grant Hall AM (born 1954) is an Australian art curator and historian.

He had a 20-year tenure as the director of the Queensland Art Gallery from 1987 to 2007.

He was born in Morwell, Victoria and attended the Victorian College of the Arts where he graduated with a Diploma of Fine Arts.

After working as a gallery director at a number of regional art galleries, Hall commenced his role as director of the Queensland Art Gallery in 1987.

Hall is credited with encouraging international partnerships which led to the establishment of the Asia-Pacific Triennial of Contemporary Art.

He also led the founding of the Gallery of Modern Art in 2006.

Returning to Melbourne in 2010, Hall was appointed Associate Professor and Honorary Fellow of the Faculty of Arts at the University of Melbourne.

Hall is also credited with helping get art from North Korea into the Asia Pacific Triennial. He curated an exhibition by North Korean artist Kim Guang-Nan in 2016 entitled "The Future Is Bright".

Among the organisations Hall has served with are the Australia Council, the Australian International Cultural Council, the Asia Arts Council, the Australia-Thailand Institute, the Victorian College of the Arts, the Sherman Contemporary Art Foundation and The Guggenheim. He has also served on the board of the Australia Japan Foundation.

In 2019, he authored "Present Tense: Anna Schwartz Gallery and Thirty-five Years of Contemporary Australian Art".

== Honours ==
In 1999, Hall received an honorary Doctor of Philosophy from the University of Queensland.

In the 2001 Queen's Birthday Honours, Hall was made a Member of the Order of Australia in recognition of his service as an art administrator and for his promotion of art from the Asia-Pacific region.

The Republic of France named Hall a Chevalier (knight) dans Ordre des Arts et des Lettres in 2006.

In 2007, Hall was named as a Queensland Great.
