= Douglas Hall (historian) =

Douglas Gordon Hawkins Hall
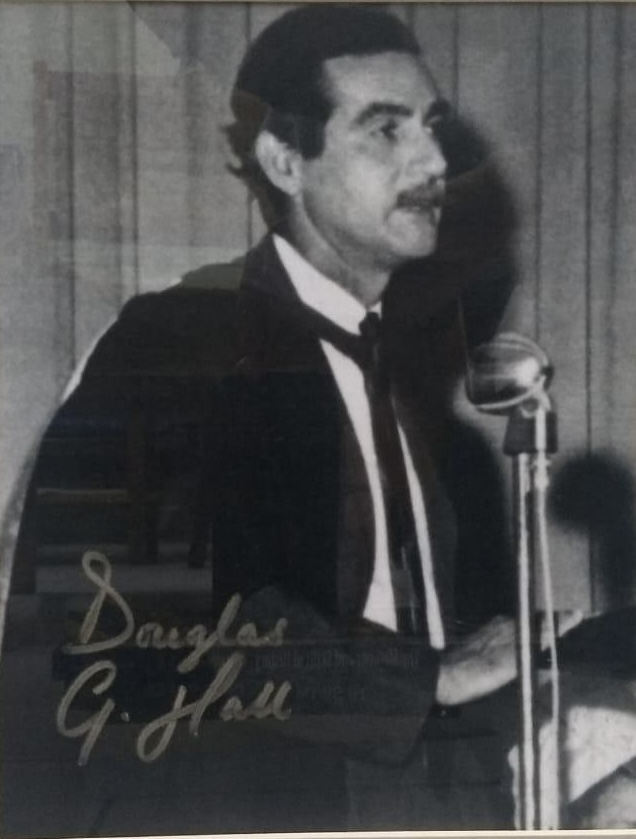
- Born: Douglas Gordon Hawkins Hall; 20 December 1920; Kingston, Jamaica
- Died: 23 November 1999 (aged 78); Darliston, Westmoreland, Jamaica
- Education: University of Toronto and London School of Economics
- Occupation: academic historian
- Known for: economic history of the Caribbean

Douglas Hall (20 December 1920 – 23 November 1999) was a Jamaican historian, academic and scholar. He was known internationally for his studies and writings on the economic history of the Caribbean.

== Early life ==
Hall was born in Kingston, Jamaica, on December 20, 1920, and attended Jamaica College where he won a gold medal in athletics.

As a 19 year old he was one of 5 Jamaican teenagers "the Lost Boys" who came close to death after being lost for 10 days in heavily forested terrain while trying to scale The Blue Mountains (Jamaica), Jamaica's longest mountain range.

He attended the University of Toronto in 1941 and completed his Master of Science in economics at Toronto in 1946.

During the Second World War he enlisted in the 1st Battalion of the 48th Highlanders of Canada on December 30, 1943, as a private. He saw active service in North Africa and Italy and ultimately attained the rank of Corporal on May 25, 1944.

After obtaining his Masters of Science he completed his PHD in History at the London School of Economics. His thesis was published as "Free Jamaica, 1838-1865: An Economic History" by the Yale University Press in 1959. It was the first detailed treatment of the Jamaican economy during the period 1838-1865 and was the first to be based on original manuscript sources in the Public Records Office.

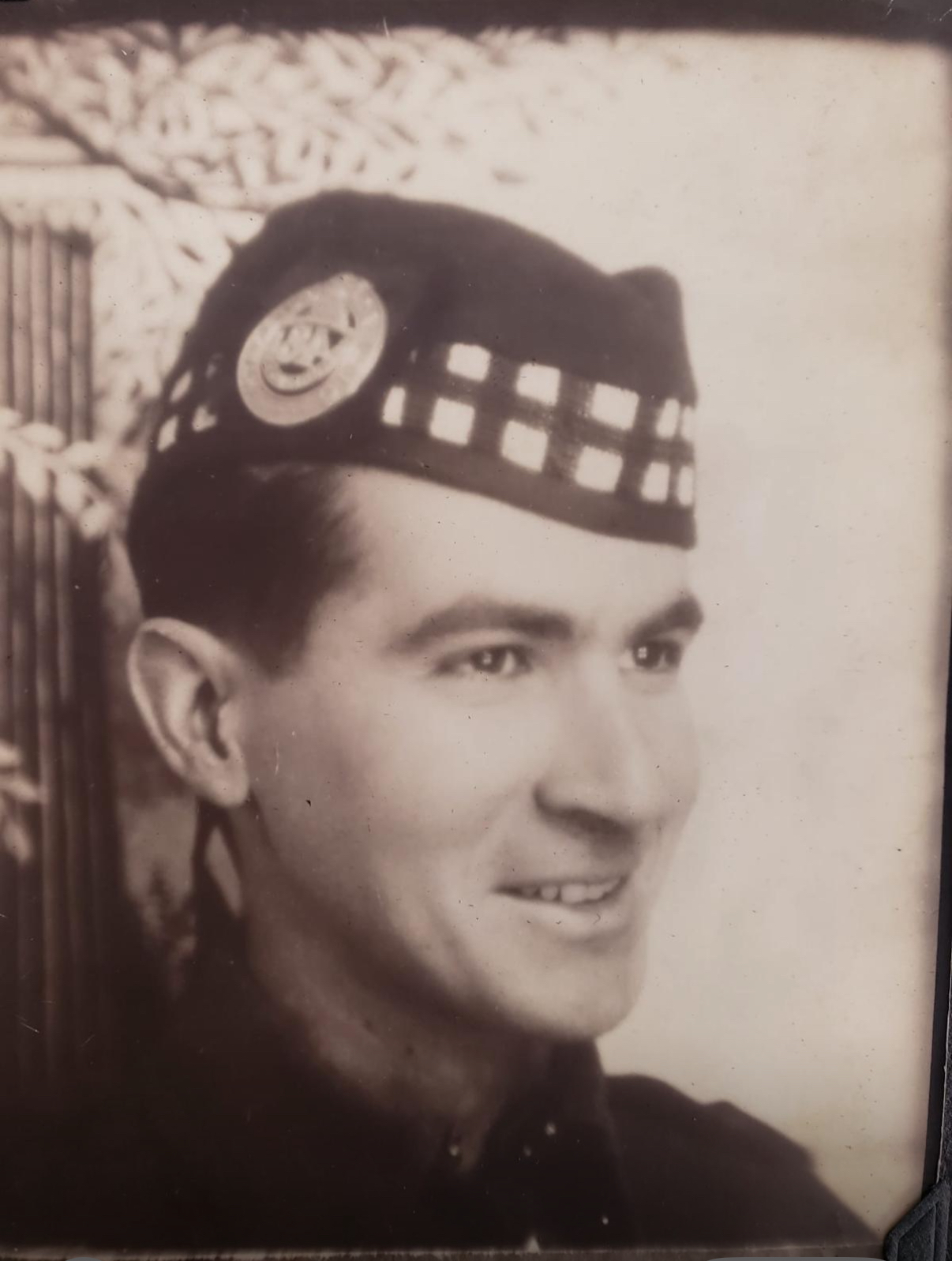
Corporal Douglas Hall 1944 48th Highlander Regiment

== Academic career ==
Hall joined the staff of the then University College of the West Indies in 1954 as a Tutor for the Leeward Islands. In 1957 he went to Jamaica as Resident Tutor at the University of the West Indies. He taught economic history in the Department of Economics between 1959 and 1961.

In 1961 he joined the Department of History as a Lecturer and was appointed Professor of History and Head of the Department in 1963. He retired in 1981 becoming a Professor Emeritus of History at the University.

Hall received a Silver Medal from the Musgrave Medal Award by the Institute of Jamaica in 1984 in recognition of his contribution to historical studies.

He was awarded The Norman Washington Manley Award for Excellence in 1999 an annual award presented to Jamaicans who have provided distinguished service to their country, often honoring outstanding contributions to national development in fields such as history, law, and politics.

His article 'The Flight from the Estates Reconsidered: The British West Indies, 1838–1842', reprinted in Caribbean Freedom, ed. Beckles and Sheperd, 55–64 was described as "the classic article on evictions from the estates".

An entire issue of The Journal of Caribbean History (JCH), a double-blind peer-reviewed journal produced by the Department of History, The University of the West Indies, the 2001 Volume 35 Issue 1, was dedicated to Hall. The JCH issue collected and reproduced a number of Hall's important articles and included an article by an eminent historian describing Hall's contribution to West Indian economic and social history.

== Publications ==
- Douglas Hall (1953) "Sir Charles Metcalfe: Governor of Jamaica September 1839 to May 1842" Caribbean Quarterly, 3 pp 90 – 100.
- Douglas Hall (1953)"The Apprenticeship Period in Jamaica, 1834 - 1838", Caribbean Quarterly, 3 pp 142 – 166.
- Douglas Hall (1954) "The Social and Economic Background to Sugar in Slave Days", Caribbean Historical Review, 3/4 (1954) 149 -169.
- Douglas Hall (1964) "Absentee Proprietorship in the British West Indies, to about 1850", Jamaican Historical Review, 4 pp. 15–35 republished (2000) in The Journal of Caribbean History Vol. 35, Iss: 1, pp 97, University of West Indies Press
- Douglas Hall (1961) "Incalculability as a feature of sugar production during the eighteenth century", Social and Economic Studies, IO pp 340 – 352: republished in (2000) The Journal of Caribbean History Vol. 35, Iss: 1, pp 80–96 University of West Indies Press.
- Douglas Hall (2000) "People in Slavery" The Journal of Caribbean History Vol. 35, Iss: 1, pp 122–138, University of West Indies Press
- Douglas Hall (with Sidney Mintz) (1960)"The Origins of the Jamaican Internal Marketing System", Yale University Publications in Anthropology, No. 57 pp 3 – 26.
- Douglas Hall "Slaves and Slavery in the British West Indies", Social and Economic Studies, (1962) 11, pp 305 – 318.
- Douglas Hart (1968) "The Colonial Legacy in Jamaica", New World Quarterly, 4 (High Season) 7 - 22. Revised version published as "The Ex-Colonial Society in Jamaica", in Emanuel de Kadt (ed.), Patterns of Foreign Influence in the Caribbean (Oxford University Press, for the Royal Institute for International Affairs, 1972), pp. 32 – 48.
- Douglas Hall "Jamaica" in David W. Cohen and Jack P. Greene (eds.), "Neither Slave Nor Free. The Freedmen of African Descent in the Slave Societies of the New World" (Baltimore and London: Johns Hopkins University Press, 1972), pp. 193 – 213.ISBN 978-0801816475
- Douglas Hall (1972) "Independent Jamaica Ten Years after 1962", Jamaica Journal, 6 (4) 2 - 3.
- Douglas Hall (1974–75) "Bountied European Immigration into Jamaica with Special Reference to the German Settlement of Seaford Town up to 1850", Jamaica Journal, 8 (4) pp 48 – 54, and 9 (1) pp 2 – 9.
- Douglas Hall (1978) "The Flight from the Estates Reconsidered: The British West Indies, 1838 - 1842", Journal of Caribbean History, 10/11 pp 7 – 24 reprinted in (1993) "Caribbean Freedom, Economy and Society from Emancipation to the Present", ed. Beckles and Shepherd, pp 55–64, Currey, London ISBN 9768100176
- Douglas Hall (1983) "Trade, government, and society in Caribbean history, 1700-1920 : essays presented to Douglas Hall" Kingston, Jamaica, W.I. : Heinemann Educational Books Caribbean.

=== Books ===
- Douglas Hall (1971) Five of the Leewards London, England, Ginn and Company Ltd. ISBN 9780602215873
- Douglas Hall (1999) In Miserable Slavery: Thomas Thistlewood in Jamaica 1750-1786. USA: University of West Indies Press. ISBN 9789766400668
- Douglas Hall (1959) “Free Jamaica, 1838-1865: An Economic History” Yale University Press; reprinted 1970, 1990 ISBN 0602215668
- Douglas Hall (1993) "Grace, Kennedy and Company Ltd. A Story of Jamaican Enterprise". ISBN 9768017155
- Douglas Hall (1982) "The Caribbean Experience : An Historical Survey, 1450-1960 Kingston, Jamaica": Heinemann Educational Books, ISBN 0435983008
- Douglas Hall (with F.R. Augier, S.C. Gordon and M. Reckord)(1960) "The Making of the West Indies" (London:Longmans.)ISBN 0582763045
- Douglas Hall (1963)" Letters from Monville", Jamaica: Ministry of Education, Publications Branch.
- Douglas Hall (1964) "Ideas and Illustrations in Economic History" , New York: Holt, Rinehart and Winston ASIN B0000CM8TW
- Douglas Hall (1971) "A Brief History of the West India Committee", Caribbean Universities Press, Barbados ISBN 0-85474-000-7

Hall was the Series Editor of the UWI Press Biography Series and the editor of the following biographies: "A Man Divided M. G. Smith", University of West Indies Press, 1997 ISBN 9766400342; "Law, Justice and Empire: The Colonial Career of John Gorrie 1829-1892" by Bridget Brereton ISBN 9766400350; "White Rebel: The Life and Times of T. T. Lewis" by Gary Lewis ISBN 9766400431 and "Bechu: 'Bound Coolie' Radical in British Guiana 1894-1901" by Clem Seecharan.ISBN 9789766400712

He died on 23 November 1999. After his death in commemoration of Hall's "pioneer work" the University of the West Indies Mona established in 2001 the Douglas Hall Chair in History.
