= Eve Laron =

Architectural writer (1931–2009)

Eve Mirjam Laron OAM (1931 – 6 July 2009) was a Hungarian-born Australian architectural writer based in Sydney.

== Biography ==
Laron was born in Hungary in 1931. In 1949, she left Hungary on foot with her future husband, George Gavriel Laron, walking through neighbouring Czechoslovakia to refugee camps in Vienna. She lived in Israel from 1949 to 1955 before emigrating to Sydney in 1955. In 1983, she founded an organisation called Constructive Women Inc., an association for female architects, landscape architects, and planners, as well as other women involved in the building industry. In 2001, she was awarded the Medal of the Order of Australia in recognition of her contribution to architectural discipline.

She died in 2009. Laron Lane is named after her in Australian Capital Territory.
