= Lesley Bartlett =

Australian activist (1927–2018)

Lesley Helene Bartlett OAM (1927–2018) was a Brisbane-based activist in women’s rights and assistance to the unemployed.

== Activism ==
Bartlett served as national president of the Women’s Action Alliance (Australia), and was actively involved in formulating Australia’s response to the United Nations Decade for Women. She also led local assistance for the unemployed in Brisbane.

== Views ==
Bartlett was an independent-minded advocate for women’s rights and for the poor. In 1980, she claimed that some initiatives from women’s rights activists gave the impression that “Australian women are a lower form of life awaiting liberation”, and was insistent that the women’s rights should include the family. She was also vocal in advocating for assistance to single-income families.

== Recognition ==
The work of Lesley Bartlett was recognized in 2001 with the awarding of an Order of Australia Medal. The citation reads: “For services to the community, particularly through issues affecting women and support for employment creation industries”.
