= Electoral results for the Division of Moreton =

Australian division election results

This is a list of electoral results for the Division of Moreton in Queensland in Australian federal elections from the division's creation in 1901 until the present.

== Members ==
Member	Party	Term
James Wilkinson	Independent Labour	1901–1904
James Wilkinson	Labour	1904–1906
Hugh Sinclair	Anti-Socialist	1906–1909
Hugh Sinclair	Liberal	1909–1917
Hugh Sinclair	Nationalist	1917–1919
Arnold Wienholt	Nationalist	1919–1922
Josiah Francis	Nationalist	1922–1931
Josiah Francis	United Australia	1931–1944
Josiah Francis	Liberal	1944–1955
(Sir) James Killen	Liberal	1955–1983
Don Cameron	Liberal	1983–1990
Garrie Gibson	Labor	1990–1996
Gary Hardgrave	Liberal	1996–2007
Graham Perrett	Labor	2007–2025
Julie-Ann Campbell	Labor	2025–present

== Election results ==
=== Elections in the 2020s ===
==== 2025 ====
2025 Australian federal election: Moreton
Party	Candidate	Votes	%	±%
Labor	Julie-Ann Campbell	39,697	42.31	+4.89
Liberal National	Henry Swindon	24,132	25.72	−7.53
Greens	Remah Naji	20,332	21.67	+0.87
One Nation	Grant Spork	2,686	2.86	−0.77
Trumpet of Patriots	Christian Julius	2,328	2.48	+0.89
People First	Natarsha Billing	2,243	2.39	+2.39
Family First	Melinda Keller	1,682	1.79	+1.79
Citizens	Max Hooper	731	0.78	+0.78
Total formal votes		93,831	95.68	−1.56
Informal votes		4,232	4.32	+1.56
Turnout		98,063	89.75	+0.89
Two-party-preferred result
Labor	Julie-Ann Campbell	62,014	66.09	+7.00
Liberal National	Henry Swindon	31,817	33.91	−7.00
Labor hold		Swing	+7.00	

==== 2022 ====
2022 Australian federal election: Moreton
Party	Candidate	Votes	%	±%
Labor	Graham Perrett	34,633	37.42	+2.27
Liberal National	Steven Huang	30,777	33.25	−7.58
Greens	Claire Garton	19,250	20.80	+4.04
One Nation	Neil Swann	3,364	3.63	+0.32
United Australia	Chelsea Follett	3,064	3.31	+1.09
Federation	Peter Power	1,468	1.59	+1.59
Total formal votes		92,556	97.24	+0.24
Informal votes		2,625	2.76	−0.24
Turnout		95,181	88.86	−2.06
Two-party-preferred result
Labor	Graham Perrett	54,690	59.09	+7.19
Liberal National	Steven Huang	37,866	40.91	−7.19
Labor hold		Swing	+7.19	

Alluvial diagram for preference flows in the seat of Moreton in the 2022 federal election. indicates at what stage the winning candidate had over 50% of the votes and was declared the winner.

=== Elections in the 2010s ===
==== 2019 ====
2019 Australian federal election: Moreton
Party	Candidate	Votes	%	±%
Liberal National	Angela Owen	37,011	40.83	+2.99
Labor	Graham Perrett	31,864	35.15	−1.60
Greens	Patsy O'Brien	15,189	16.76	+3.74
One Nation	William Lawrence	3,002	3.31	+3.31
United Australia	Jenny-Rebecca Brown	2,015	2.22	+2.22
Conservative National	Aaron Nieass	1,561	1.72	+1.72
Total formal votes		90,642	97.00	+1.11
Informal votes		2,799	3.00	−1.11
Turnout		93,441	90.92	−0.79
Two-party-preferred result
Labor	Graham Perrett	47,045	51.90	−2.12
Liberal National	Angela Owen	43,597	48.10	+2.12
Labor hold		Swing	−2.12	

==== 2016 ====
2016 Australian federal election: Moreton
Party	Candidate	Votes	%	±%
Liberal National	Nic Monsour	32,103	37.79	−4.45
Labor	Graham Perrett	31,342	36.90	−1.83
Greens	Kristen Lyons	10,812	12.73	+2.74
Xenophon	Des Soares	4,072	4.79	+4.79
Liberal Democrats	Andrew Cooper	2,783	3.28	+3.28
Family First	Florian Heise	2,507	2.95	+1.43
Katter's Australian	Shan-Ju Lin	1,329	1.56	+0.26
Total formal votes		84,948	95.89	+1.51
Informal votes		3,641	4.11	−1.51
Turnout		88,589	90.60	−2.07
Two-party-preferred result
Labor	Graham Perrett	45,892	54.02	+2.47
Liberal National	Nic Monsour	39,056	45.98	−2.47
Labor hold		Swing	+2.47	

==== 2013 ====
2013 Australian federal election: Moreton
Party	Candidate	Votes	%	±%
Liberal National	Malcolm Cole	34,824	42.24	−1.16
Labor	Graham Perrett	31,932	38.73	+2.72
Greens	Elissa Jenkins	8,234	9.99	−5.90
Palmer United	Jeremy Davey	4,147	5.03	+5.03
Family First	Carolyn Ferrando	1,250	1.52	−1.92
Katter's Australian	Chris Mallcott	1,070	1.30	+1.30
Future	Hayden Muscat	481	0.58	+0.58
Rise Up Australia	Bruce Fry	303	0.37	+0.37
Citizens Electoral Council	Wayne Grunert	208	0.25	+0.25
Total formal votes		82,449	94.38	−0.77
Informal votes		4,912	5.62	+0.77
Turnout		87,361	92.65	+0.78
Two-party-preferred result
Labor	Graham Perrett	42,503	51.55	+0.42
Liberal National	Malcolm Cole	39,946	48.45	−0.42
Labor hold		Swing	+0.42	

==== 2010 ====
2010 Australian federal election: Moreton
Party	Candidate	Votes	%	±%
Liberal National	Malcolm Cole	35,182	43.40	+2.56
Labor	Graham Perrett	29,190	36.01	−12.12
Greens	Elissa Jenkins	12,882	15.89	+8.74
Family First	Steve Christian	2,787	3.44	+1.97
Democratic Labor	Lee Nightingale	1,018	1.26	+1.26
Total formal votes		81,059	95.15	−1.69
Informal votes		4,128	4.85	+1.69
Turnout		85,187	91.86	−3.16
Two-party-preferred result
Labor	Graham Perrett	41,447	51.13	−4.88
Liberal National	Malcolm Cole	39,612	48.87	+4.88
Labor hold		Swing	−4.88	

=== Elections in the 2000s ===
==== 2007 ====
2007 Australian federal election: Moreton
Party	Candidate	Votes	%	±%
Labor	Graham Perrett	37,908	47.11	+7.27
Liberal	Gary Hardgrave	33,921	42.16	−5.41
Greens	Emma Hine	5,548	6.89	+1.12
Family First	Steve Christian	1,113	1.38	−1.40
Democrats	Emad Soliman	1,015	1.26	−0.41
Independent	Andrew Lamb	679	0.84	−0.10
Liberty & Democracy	Shane Brown	282	0.35	+0.35
Total formal votes		80,466	96.86	+1.74
Informal votes		2,611	3.14	−1.74
Turnout		83,077	94.17	+0.37
Two-party-preferred result
Labor	Graham Perrett	44,055	54.75	+7.58
Liberal	Gary Hardgrave	36,411	45.25	−7.58
Labor gain from Liberal		Swing	+7.58	

==== 2004 ====
2004 Australian federal election: Moreton
Party	Candidate	Votes	%	±%
Liberal	Gary Hardgrave	38,708	49.11	+1.90
Labor	Graham Perrett	30,828	39.12	+0.14
Greens	Jane Williamson	4,182	5.31	+1.47
Family First	Terence Tam	2,142	2.72	+2.72
Democrats	Frederika Steen	1,307	1.66	−3.80
One Nation	Barry Weedon	846	1.07	−2.37
Independent	Andrew Lamb	799	1.01	−0.06
Total formal votes		78,812	95.06	−0.16
Informal votes		4,096	4.94	+0.16
Turnout		82,908	93.87	−1.30
Two-party-preferred result
Liberal	Gary Hardgrave	42,694	54.17	+1.61
Labor	Graham Perrett	36,118	45.83	−1.61
Liberal hold		Swing	+1.61	

==== 2001 ====
2001 Australian federal election: Moreton
Party	Candidate	Votes	%	±%
Liberal	Gary Hardgrave	39,148	48.74	+5.62
Labor	Kathleen Brookes	29,144	36.29	−3.64
Democrats	Tracy Comans	4,525	5.63	+0.46
Greens	Lenore Taylor	3,677	4.58	+1.22
One Nation	Barry Weedon	2,433	3.03	−4.16
Independent	Andrew Lamb	1,385	1.72	+1.72
Total formal votes		80,312	95.70	−1.27
Informal votes		3,606	4.30	+1.27
Turnout		83,918	94.73	
Two-party-preferred result
Liberal	Gary Hardgrave	43,535	54.21	+3.64
Labor	Kathleen Brookes	36,777	45.79	−3.64
Liberal hold		Swing	+3.64	

=== Elections in the 1990s ===
==== 1998 ====
1998 Australian federal election: Moreton
Party	Candidate	Votes	%	±%
Liberal	Gary Hardgrave	33,724	43.12	−7.76
Labor	Kathleen Brookes	31,227	39.93	+3.99
One Nation	Vanessa Stewart	5,626	7.19	+7.19
Democrats	Anthony Lee	4,046	5.17	−1.71
Greens	Lenore Taylor	2,627	3.36	+0.08
Christian Democrats	Jim Vote	959	1.23	+1.23
Total formal votes		78,209	96.97	−0.34
Informal votes		2,444	3.03	+0.34
Turnout		80,653	94.26	−0.57
Two-party-preferred result
Liberal	Gary Hardgrave	39,554	50.57	−5.40
Labor	Kathleen Brookes	38,655	49.43	+5.40
Liberal hold		Swing	−5.40	

==== 1996 ====
1996 Australian federal election: Moreton
Party	Candidate	Votes	%	±%
Liberal	Gary Hardgrave	39,268	50.18	+7.83
Labor	Garrie Gibson	28,886	36.92	−6.62
Democrats	Kirsten Kirk	5,076	6.49	+1.78
Greens	Annette Wilson	2,572	3.29	−0.48
AAFI	Keith Bremner	735	0.94	+0.94
Independent	Wendy Dent	581	0.74	+0.74
Independent	Cameron Armstrong	547	0.70	+0.70
Independent	Shane Dean	234	0.30	+0.07
Indigenous Peoples	Norman Johns	195	0.25	−0.37
Natural Law	Jacqueline Dhanji-Ayyar	153	0.20	+0.17
Total formal votes		78,247	97.16	−0.10
Informal votes		2,288	2.84	+0.10
Turnout		80,535	94.83	−0.75
Two-party-preferred result
Liberal	Gary Hardgrave	42,997	55.09	+5.30
Labor	Garrie Gibson	35,051	44.91	−5.30
Liberal gain from Labor		Swing	+5.30	

==== 1993 ====
1993 Australian federal election: Moreton
Party	Candidate	Votes	%	±%
Labor	Garrie Gibson	33,065	44.49	+2.45
Liberal	Margaret Steen	30,474	41.00	+0.18
Democrats	Ian Holland	3,407	4.58	−8.25
Greens	D. C. Beattie-Burnett	3,050	4.10	+3.03
National	John Kearns	2,074	2.79	+0.15
Indigenous Peoples	Martin Ebsworth	671	0.90	+0.90
Confederate Action	Rod Jeanneret	613	0.82	+0.82
Independent	Jim O'Dempsey	370	0.50	+0.50
Independent	Ira Smith	370	0.50	+0.50
	Shane Dean	233	0.31	+0.31
Total formal votes		74,327	97.27	−0.54
Informal votes		2,086	2.73	+0.54
Turnout		76,413	95.58	
Two-party-preferred result
Labor	Garrie Gibson	38,424	51.74	−0.12
Liberal	Margaret Steen	35,844	48.26	+0.12
Labor hold		Swing	−0.12	

==== 1990 ====
1990 Australian federal election: Moreton
Party	Candidate	Votes	%	±%
Labor	Garrie Gibson	26,960	42.7	−2.4
Liberal	Don Cameron	26,323	41.7	+3.5
Democrats	Ken Davies	8,516	13.5	+7.6
National	Vince Cottrell	1,366	2.2	−8.6
Total formal votes		63,165	98.0	
Informal votes		1,275	2.0	
Turnout		64,440	95.3	
Two-party-preferred result
Labor	Garrie Gibson	32,996	52.3	+3.0
Liberal	Don Cameron	30,037	47.7	−3.0
Labor gain from Liberal		Swing	+3.0	

=== Elections in the 1980s ===
==== 1987 ====
1987 Australian federal election: Moreton
Party	Candidate	Votes	%	±%
Labor	Garrie Gibson	28,053	45.1	+1.6
Liberal	Don Cameron	23,740	38.2	−4.4
National	Peter Freckleton	6,712	10.8	+1.7
Democrats	Manfred Willinger	3,665	5.9	+1.0
Total formal votes		62,170	97.0	
Informal votes		1,933	3.0	
Turnout		64,103	93.5	
Two-party-preferred result
Liberal	Don Cameron	31,518	50.7	−2.6
Labor	Garrie Gibson	30,645	49.3	+2.6
Liberal hold		Swing	−2.6	

==== 1984 ====
1984 Australian federal election: Moreton
Party	Candidate	Votes	%	±%
Labor	Michael Kinnane	26,441	43.5	−3.1
Liberal	Don Cameron	25,875	42.6	−3.0
National	Howard Baskerville	5,534	9.1	+9.1
Democrats	Geoffrey Fawthrop	2,956	4.9	−1.8
Total formal votes		60,806	95.9	
Informal votes		2,578	4.1	
Turnout		63,384	94.0	
Two-party-preferred result
Liberal	Don Cameron	32,381	53.3	+2.8
Labor	Michael Kinnane	28,419	46.7	−2.8
Liberal hold		Swing	+2.8	

==== 1983 by-election ====
1983 Moreton by-election
Party	Candidate	Votes	%	±%
Liberal	Don Cameron	31,440	52.1	+5.4
Labor	Barbara Robson	28,130	46.6	+1.1
Pensioner	Norman Eater	508	0.8	+0.8
Humanitarian	Marcus Platen	252	0.4	+0.4
Total formal votes		60,330	98.9	
Informal votes		655	1.1	
Turnout		60,985	90.6	
Two-party-preferred result
Liberal	Don Cameron	31,882	52.8	+1.2
Labor	Barbara Robson	28,448	47.2	−1.2
Liberal hold		Swing	+1.2	

==== 1983 ====
1983 Australian federal election: Moreton
Party	Candidate	Votes	%	±%
Liberal	Sir James Killen	29,638	46.7	−4.0
Labor	Barbara Robson	28,854	45.5	+3.2
Democrats	Leonard Fitzgerald	4,230	6.7	+2.0
Socialist Workers	Helen Jones	712	1.1	+1.1
Total formal votes		63,434	98.5	
Informal votes		987	1.5	
Turnout		64,421	92.8	
Two-party-preferred result
Liberal	Sir James Killen	32,728	51.6	−3.0
Labor	Barbara Robson	30,706	48.4	+3.0
Liberal hold		Swing	−3.0	

==== 1980 ====
1980 Australian federal election: Moreton
Party	Candidate	Votes	%	±%
Liberal	James Killen	31,157	50.7	−5.3
Labor	Barbara Robson	25,997	42.3	+8.2
Democrats	Betty Whitworth	2,877	4.7	−2.3
Independent	Graham Bell	1,064	1.7	+0.2
Progress	Patrick Dixon	407	0.7	−0.7
Total formal votes		61,502	98.1	
Informal votes		1,221	1.9	
Turnout		62,723	94.7	
Two-party-preferred result
Liberal	James Killen		54.6	−7.4
Labor	Barbara Robson		45.4	+7.4
Liberal hold		Swing	−7.4	

=== Elections in the 1970s ===
==== 1977 ====
1977 Australian federal election: Moreton
Party	Candidate	Votes	%	±%
Liberal	James Killen	34,231	56.0	−6.1
Labor	Barbara Robson	20,864	34.1	−1.6
Democrats	Dirk Plooy	4,278	7.0	+7.0
Independent	Graham Bell	915	1.5	+1.5
Progress	Frederick Drake	887	1.4	+1.4
Total formal votes		61,175	98.5	
Informal votes		903	1.5	
Turnout		62,078	95.0	
Two-party-preferred result
Liberal	James Killen		62.0	−0.7
Labor	Barbara Robson		38.0	+0.7
Liberal hold		Swing	−0.7	

==== 1975 ====
1975 Australian federal election: Moreton
Party	Candidate	Votes	%	±%
Liberal	James Killen	35,003	61.9	+6.4
Labor	Lewin Blazevich	20,338	35.9	−6.5
Independent	William Appleton	929	1.6	+1.6
Independent	John Fitzgerald	323	0.6	+0.6
Total formal votes		56,593	98.8	
Informal votes		686	1.2	
Turnout		57,279	95.8	
Two-party-preferred result
Liberal	James Killen		62.5	+6.2
Labor	Lewin Blazevich		37.5	−6.2
Liberal hold		Swing	+6.2	

==== 1974 ====
1974 Australian federal election: Moreton
Party	Candidate	Votes	%	±%
Liberal	James Killen	31,442	55.5	+7.6
Labor	William Forgan-Smith	23,999	42.4	−0.4
Australia	Robert McClintock	1,208	2.1	−0.8
Total formal votes		56,649	98.8	
Informal votes		669	1.2	
Turnout		57,318	95.1	
Two-party-preferred result
Liberal	James Killen		56.3	+1.8
Labor	William Forgan-Smith		45.7	−1.8
Liberal hold		Swing	+1.8	

==== 1972 ====
1972 Australian federal election: Moreton
Party	Candidate	Votes	%	±%
Liberal	James Killen	24,706	47.9	−0.1
Labor	Joe McDonald	22,071	42.8	−1.6
Democratic Labor	Andrew Jackson	3,262	6.3	+0.5
Australia	Arthur Smith	1,507	2.9	+2.9
Total formal votes		51,546	98.3	
Informal votes		906	1.7	
Turnout		52,452	95.2	
Two-party-preferred result
Liberal	James Killen	28,074	54.5	+1.2
Labor	Joe McDonald	23,472	45.5	−1.2
Liberal hold		Swing	+1.2	

=== Elections in the 1960s ===
==== 1969 ====
1969 Australian federal election: Moreton
Party	Candidate	Votes	%	±%
Liberal	James Killen	24,273	48.0	−5.4
Labor	George Harvey	22,456	44.4	+4.6
Democratic Labor	Clarrissa Weedon	2,915	5.8	−1.0
Independent	Kitchener Farrell	891	1.8	+1.8
Total formal votes		50,535	98.6	
Informal votes		697	1.4	
Turnout		51,232	95.0	
Two-party-preferred result
Liberal	James Killen	26,944	53.3	−5.3
Labor	George Harvey	23,591	46.7	+5.3
Liberal hold		Swing	−5.3	

==== 1966 ====
1966 Australian federal election: Moreton
Party	Candidate	Votes	%	±%
Liberal	James Killen	35,179	54.4	+5.1
Labor	Len Keogh	25,092	38.8	−5.4
Democratic Labor	Miroslav Jansky	4,405	6.8	+0.3
Total formal votes		64,676	97.8	
Informal votes		1,368	2.1	
Turnout		66,044	95.5	
Two-party-preferred result
Liberal	James Killen		59.0	+4.0
Labor	Len Keogh		41.0	−4.0
Liberal hold		Swing	+4.0	

==== 1963 ====
1963 Australian federal election: Moreton
Party	Candidate	Votes	%	±%
Liberal	James Killen	28,574	49.3	+6.0
Labor	John O'Donnell	25,609	44.2	−3.8
Democratic Labor	Eric Allingham	3,790	6.5	−0.9
Total formal votes		57,973	97.6	
Informal votes		1,408	2.4	
Turnout		59,381	95.7	
Two-party-preferred result
Liberal	James Killen	31,893	55.0	+4.9
Labor	John O'Donnell	26,080	45.0	−4.9
Liberal hold		Swing	+4.9	

==== 1961 ====
1961 Australian federal election: Moreton
Party	Candidate	Votes	%	±%
Labor	John O'Donnell	25,123	48.0	+11.8
Liberal	James Killen	22,667	43.3	−7.6
Queensland Labor	Christian Hagen	3,882	7.4	−2.7
Communist	Max Julius	676	1.3	−1.5
Total formal votes		52,348	96.5	
Informal votes		1,921	3.5	
Turnout		54,269	95.2	
Two-party-preferred result
Liberal	James Killen	26,239	50.1	−10.2
Labor	John O'Donnell	26,109	49.9	+10.2
Liberal hold		Swing	−10.2	

=== Elections in the 1950s ===
==== 1958 ====
1958 Australian federal election: Moreton
Party	Candidate	Votes	%	±%
Liberal	James Killen	23,460	50.9	−0.8
Labor	Bernard Ouston	16,687	36.2	−10.3
Queensland Labor	Ted Mansfield	4,652	10.1	+10.1
Communist	Max Julius	1,297	2.8	+1.0
Total formal votes		46,096	96.1	
Informal votes		1,888	3.9	
Turnout		47,984	96.6	
Two-party-preferred result
Liberal	James Killen		60.3	+8.4
Labor	Bernard Ouston		39.7	−8.4
Liberal hold		Swing	+8.4	

==== 1955 ====
1955 Australian federal election: Moreton
Party	Candidate	Votes	%	±%
Liberal	James Killen	20,908	51.7	−4.2
Labor	Allen Edwards	18,788	46.5	+3.8
Communist	Max Julius	713	1.8	+0.4
Total formal votes		40,409	97.8	
Informal votes		919	2.2	
Turnout		41,328	94.8	
Two-party-preferred result
Liberal	James Killen		51.9	−4.6
Labor	Allen Edwards		48.1	+4.6
Liberal hold		Swing	−4.6	

==== 1954 ====
1954 Australian federal election: Moreton
Party	Candidate	Votes	%	±%
Liberal	Josiah Francis	30,873	55.7	−3.8
Labor	Ted Mansfield	23,657	42.6	+3.9
Communist	Bill Yarrow	946	1.7	−0.1
Total formal votes		55,476	98.8	
Informal votes		633	1.1	
Turnout		56,109	96.3	
Two-party-preferred result
Liberal	Josiah Francis		55.9	−3.8
Labor	Ted Mansfield		44.1	+3.8
Liberal hold		Swing	−3.8	

==== 1951 ====
1951 Australian federal election: Moreton
Party	Candidate	Votes	%	±%
Liberal	Josiah Francis	27,146	59.5	−1.9
Labor	Ted Mansfield	17,661	38.7	+2.3
Communist	Bill Yarrow	813	1.8	−0.4
Total formal votes		45,620	98.0	
Informal votes		914	2.0	
Turnout		46,534	96.0	
Two-party-preferred result
Liberal	Josiah Francis		59.7	−1.9
Labor	Ted Mansfield		40.3	+1.9
Liberal hold		Swing	−1.9	

=== Elections in the 1940s ===
==== 1949 ====
1949 Australian federal election: Moreton
Party	Candidate	Votes	%	±%
Liberal	Josiah Francis	25,125	61.4	+8.1
Labor	William Thieme	14,915	36.4	−5.6
Communist	Bill Yarrow	904	2.2	+2.2
Total formal votes		40,944	97.9	
Informal votes		867	2.1	
Turnout		41,811	95.2	
Two-party-preferred result
Liberal	Josiah Francis		61.6	+0.8
Labor	William Thieme		38.4	−0.8
Liberal hold		Swing	+0.8	

==== 1946 ====
1946 Australian federal election: Moreton
Party	Candidate	Votes	%	±%
Liberal	Josiah Francis	42,521	60.4	+10.4
Labor	Jack Perrett	22,934	32.6	−8.4
Services	Charles McCormack	4,985	7.1	+7.1
Total formal votes		70,440	97.7	
Informal votes		1,690	2.3	
Turnout		72,130	94.2	
Two-party-preferred result
Liberal	Josiah Francis		65.7	+9.0
Labor	Jack Perrett		34.3	−9.0
Liberal hold		Swing	+9.0	

==== 1943 ====
1943 Australian federal election: Moreton
Party	Candidate	Votes	%	±%
United Australia	Josiah Francis	32,681	50.0	−9.3
Labor	Patrick McInally	26,804	41.0	+0.2
One Parliament	Ralph Belcham	3,747	5.7	+5.7
Country	John Cantwell	2,093	3.2	+3.2
Total formal votes		65,325	97.7	
Informal votes		1,658	2.3	
Turnout		66,893	95.3	
Two-party-preferred result
United Australia	Josiah Francis		56.7	−2.6
Labor	Patrick McInally		43.3	+2.6
United Australia hold		Swing	−2.6	

==== 1940 ====
1940 Australian federal election: Moreton
Party	Candidate	Votes	%	±%
United Australia	Josiah Francis	36,265	59.3	+4.0
Labor	Henry Herbert	24,938	40.7	+3.7
Total formal votes		61,203	98.0	
Informal votes		1,268	2.0	
Turnout		62,471	95.8	
United Australia hold		Swing	+0.2	

=== Elections in the 1930s ===
==== 1937 ====
1937 Australian federal election: Moreton
Party	Candidate	Votes	%	±%
United Australia	Josiah Francis	32,813	55.3	+4.1
Labor	John McCoy	22,021	37.1	−1.1
Social Credit	Henry Hogg	4,508	7.6	−3.0
Total formal votes		59,342	97.8	
Informal votes		1,335	2.2	
Turnout		60,677	97.7	
Two-party-preferred result
United Australia	Josiah Francis		59.1	+2.6
Labor	John McCoy		40.9	−2.6
United Australia hold		Swing	+2.6	

==== 1934 ====
1934 Australian federal election: Moreton
Party	Candidate	Votes	%	±%
United Australia	Josiah Francis	27,951	51.2	−48.8
Labor	Jack Perrett	20,886	38.2	+38.2
Social Credit	William Worley	5,794	10.6	+10.6
Total formal votes		54,631	97.3	
Informal votes		1,525	2.7	
Turnout		56,156	96.2	
Two-party-preferred result
United Australia	Josiah Francis		56.5	−43.5
Labor	Jack Perrett		43.5	+43.5
United Australia hold		Swing	−43.5	

==== 1931 ====
1931 Australian federal election: Moreton
Party	Candidate	Votes	%	±%
United Australia	Josiah Francis	unopposed		
United Australia hold		Swing		

=== Elections in the 1920s ===
==== 1929 ====
1929 Australian federal election: Moreton
Party	Candidate	Votes	%	±%
Nationalist	Josiah Francis	27,716	60.1	−39.9
Labor	Robert Taylor	18,371	39.9	+39.9
Total formal votes		46,087	96.4	
Informal votes		1,733	3.6	
Turnout		47,820	96.2	
Nationalist hold		Swing	−39.9	

==== 1928 ====
1928 Australian federal election: Moreton
Party	Candidate	Votes	%	±%
Nationalist	Josiah Francis	unopposed		
Nationalist hold		Swing		

==== 1925 ====
1925 Australian federal election: Moreton
Party	Candidate	Votes	%	±%
Nationalist	Josiah Francis	25,650	63.2	+18.7
Labor	Horace Lee	14,907	36.8	−1.4
Total formal votes		40,557	96.8	
Informal votes		1,325	3.2	
Turnout		41,882	94.1	
Nationalist hold		Swing	+3.7	

==== 1922 ====
1922 Australian federal election: Moreton
Party	Candidate	Votes	%	±%
Nationalist	Josiah Francis	14,762	44.5	−12.0
Labor	Horace Lee	12,676	38.2	−5.3
Country	Francis Brewer	5,714	17.2	+17.2
Total formal votes		33,152	94.7	
Informal votes		1,852	5.3	
Turnout		35,004	85.3	
Two-party-preferred result
Nationalist	Josiah Francis	19,730	59.5	+3.0
Labor	Horace Lee	13,422	40.5	−3.0
Nationalist hold		Swing	+3.0	

=== Elections in the 1910s ===
==== 1919 ====
1919 Australian federal election: Moreton
Party	Candidate	Votes	%	±%
Nationalist	Arnold Wienholt	17,834	55.2	+5.1
Labor	William Heffernan	14,491	44.8	−5.1
Total formal votes		32,325	98.3	
Informal votes		572	1.7	
Turnout		32,897	84.8	
Nationalist hold		Swing	+5.1	

==== 1917 ====
1917 Australian federal election: Moreton
Party	Candidate	Votes	%	±%
Nationalist	Hugh Sinclair	16,292	50.1	−7.2
Labor	Cuthbert Butler	16,234	49.9	+7.2
Total formal votes		32,526	98.2	
Informal votes		601	1.8	
Turnout		33,127	87.2	
Nationalist hold		Swing	−7.2	

==== 1914 ====
1914 Australian federal election: Moreton
Party	Candidate	Votes	%	±%
Liberal	Hugh Sinclair	15,811	57.3	−3.4
Labor	John Sherlock	11,774	42.7	+3.4
Total formal votes		27,585	97.6	
Informal votes		667	2.4	
Turnout		28,252	77.8	
Liberal hold		Swing	−3.4	

==== 1913 ====
1913 Australian federal election: Moreton
Party	Candidate	Votes	%	±%
Liberal	Hugh Sinclair	16,967	60.7	−3.4
Labor	John Sherlock	10,975	39.3	+3.4
Total formal votes		27,942	97.5	
Informal votes		709	2.5	
Turnout		28,651	80.0	
Liberal hold		Swing	−3.4	

==== 1910 ====
1910 Australian federal election: Moreton
Party	Candidate	Votes	%	±%
Liberal	Hugh Sinclair	11,276	61.1	−1.4
Labour	Thomas Emmerson	7,191	38.9	+1.4
Total formal votes		18,467	97.7	
Informal votes		442	2.3	
Turnout		18,909	58.7	
Liberal hold		Swing	−1.4	

=== Elections in the 1900s ===
==== 1906 ====
1906 Australian federal election: Moreton
Party	Candidate	Votes	%	±%
Anti-Socialist	Hugh Sinclair	10,055	62.5	+18.3
Labour	James Wilkinson	6,038	37.5	+37.5
Total formal votes		16,093	96.9	
Informal votes		514	3.1	
Turnout		16,607	52.4	
Anti-Socialist gain from Independent Labour		Swing	+18.3	

==== 1903 ====
1903 Australian federal election: Moreton
Party	Candidate	Votes	%	±%
Independent Labour	James Wilkinson	6,941	55.8	+16.4
Protectionist	George Harrison	5,508	44.2	+12.0
Total formal votes		12,449	98.3	
Informal votes		214	1.7	
Turnout		12,663	46.4	
Independent Labour hold		Swing	+2.2	

==== 1901 ====
1901 Australian federal election: Moreton
Party	Candidate	Votes	%	±%
Independent Labour	James Wilkinson	2,569	39.4	+39.4
Protectionist	Anthony Darvall	2,099	32.2	+32.2
Protectionist	William Ryott Maughan	1,296	19.9	+19.9
Independent	Edward Kretschmer	301	4.6	+4.6
Protectionist	William Kellett	149	2.3	+2.3
Independent	Robert Neilson	114	1.7	+1.7
Total formal votes		6,528	94.4	
Informal votes		388	5.6	
Turnout		6,916	56.7	
Independent Labour win		(new seat)		
