= Results of the 2013 Australian federal election in Queensland =

2013 Australian federal election (Queensland)
← 2010	7 September 2013	2016 →

All 30 Queensland seats in the Australian House of Representatives and 6 (of the 12) seats in the Australian Senate
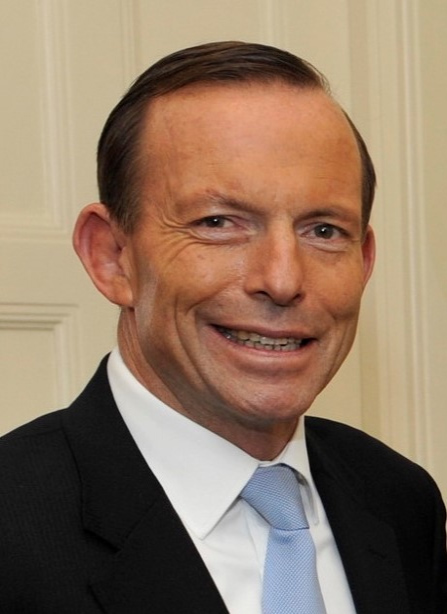

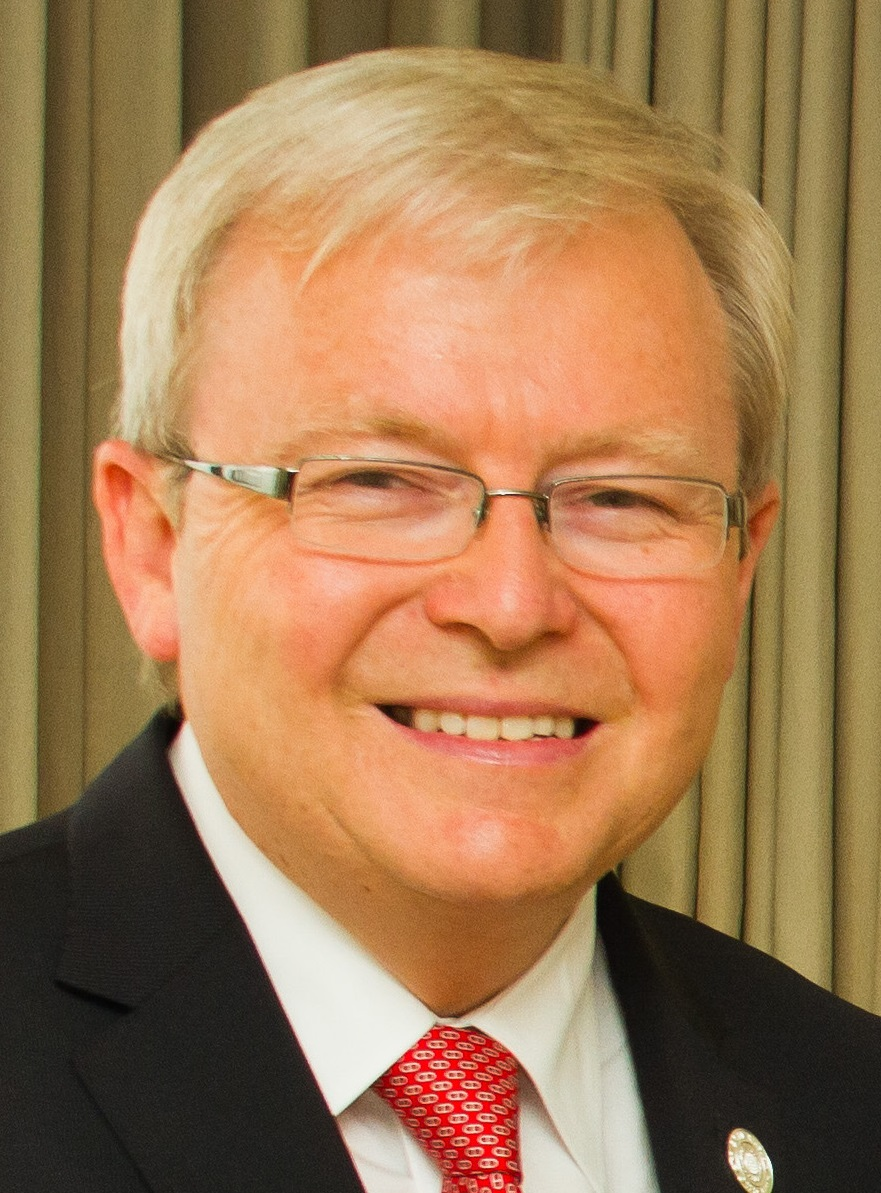

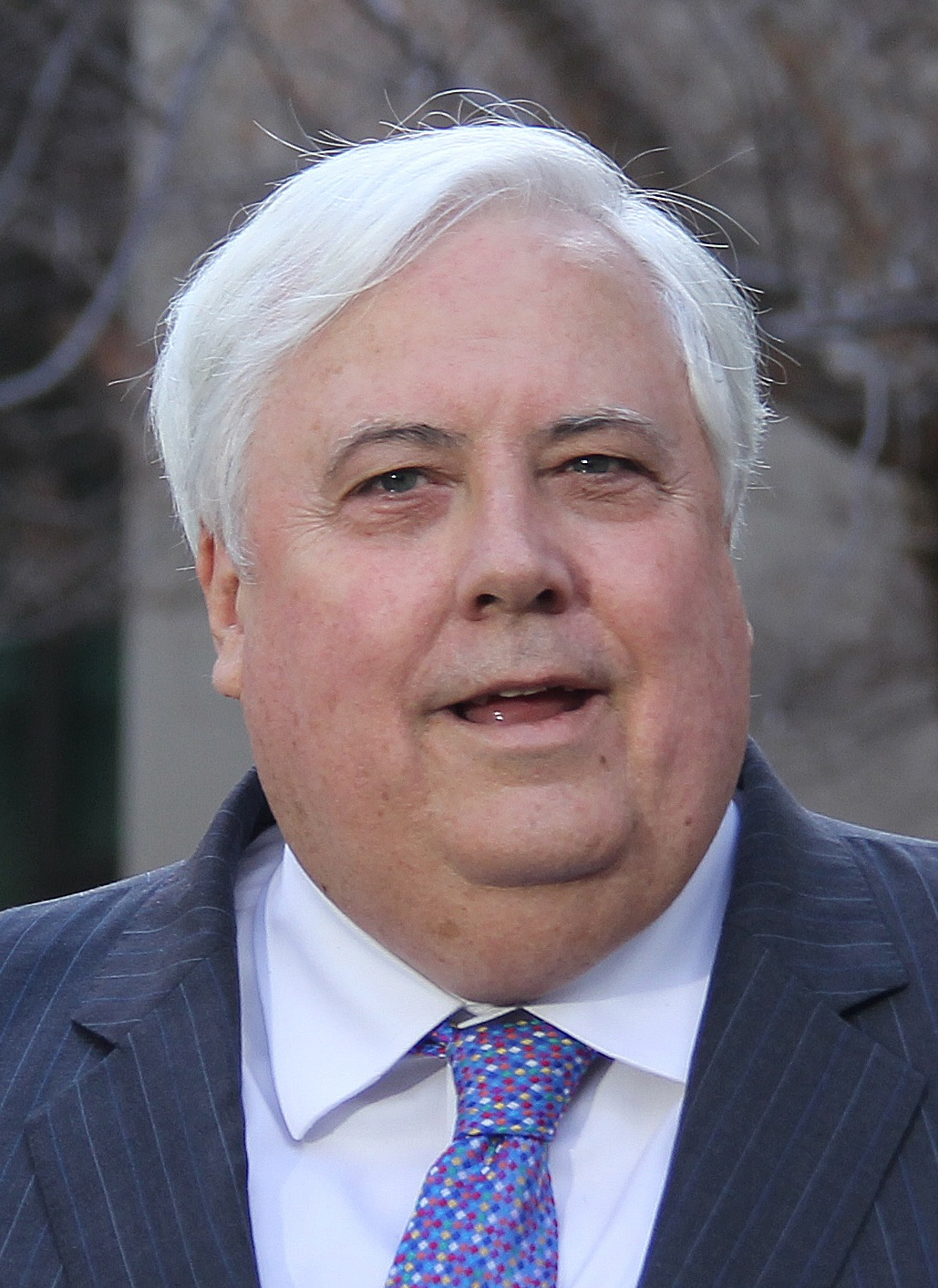

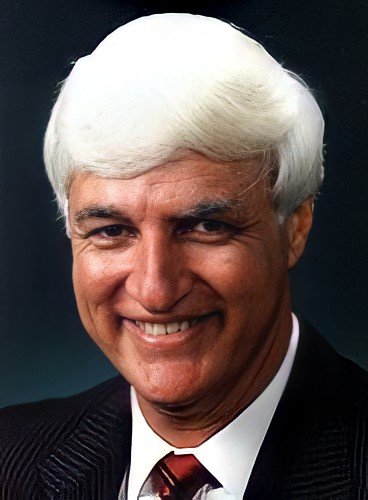
	First party	Second party
Leader	Tony Abbott	Kevin Rudd
Party	Coalition	Labor
Last election	21 seats	8 seats
Seats before	21	8
Seats won	22	6
Seat change	▲1	▼2
Popular vote	1,152,217	751,230
Percentage	45.66%	29.77%
Swing	▼1.76	▼3.81
TPP	56.98%	43.02%
TPP swing	▲1.84	▼1.84
	Third party	Fourth party
Leader	Clive Palmer	Bob Katter
Party	Palmer United	Katter's Australian
Last election	—	—
Seats before	0	1
Seats won	1	1
Seat change	▲1	Steady
Popular vote	278,125	94,540
Percentage	11.02%	3.75%
Swing	▲11.02	▲2.15
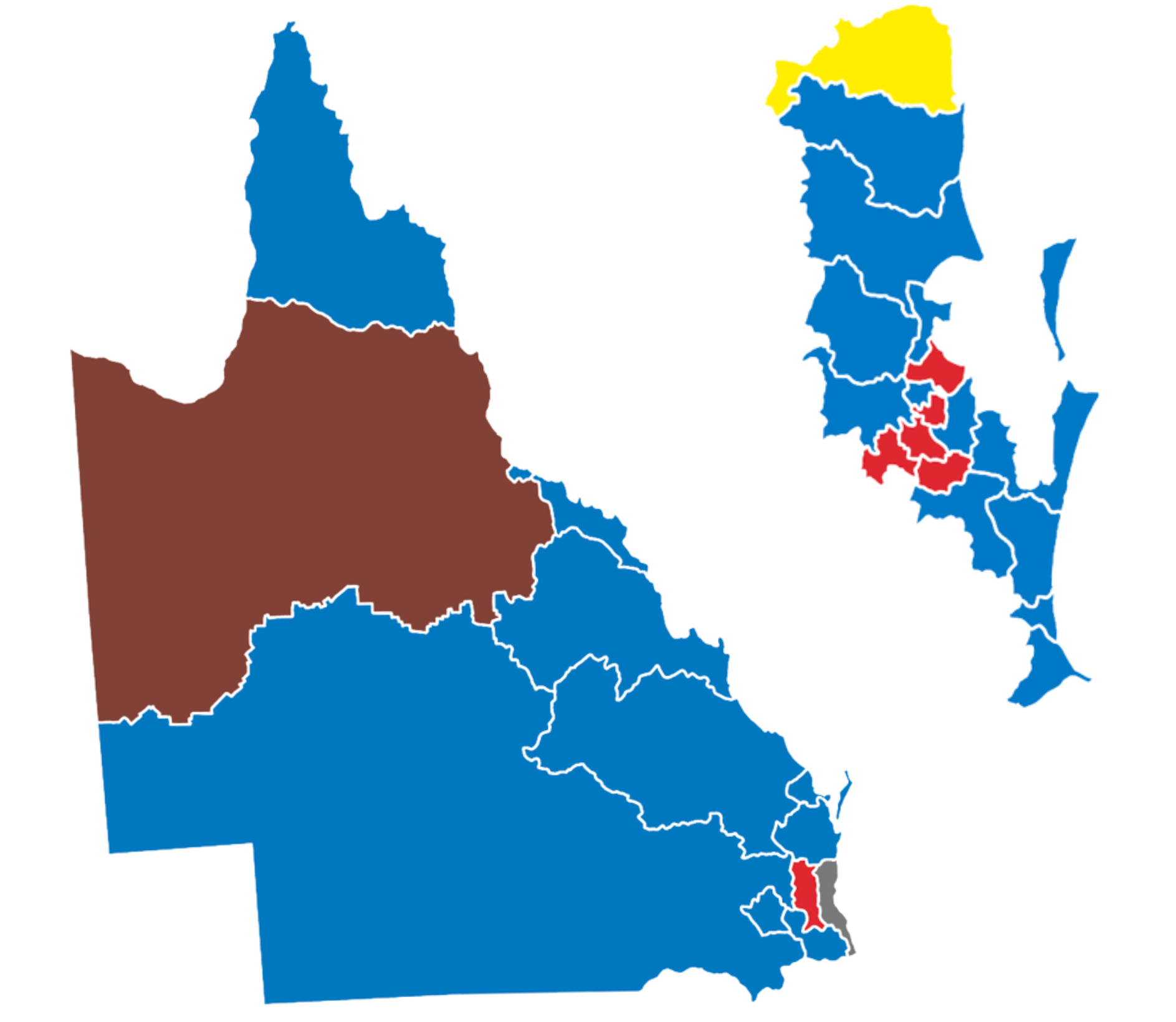
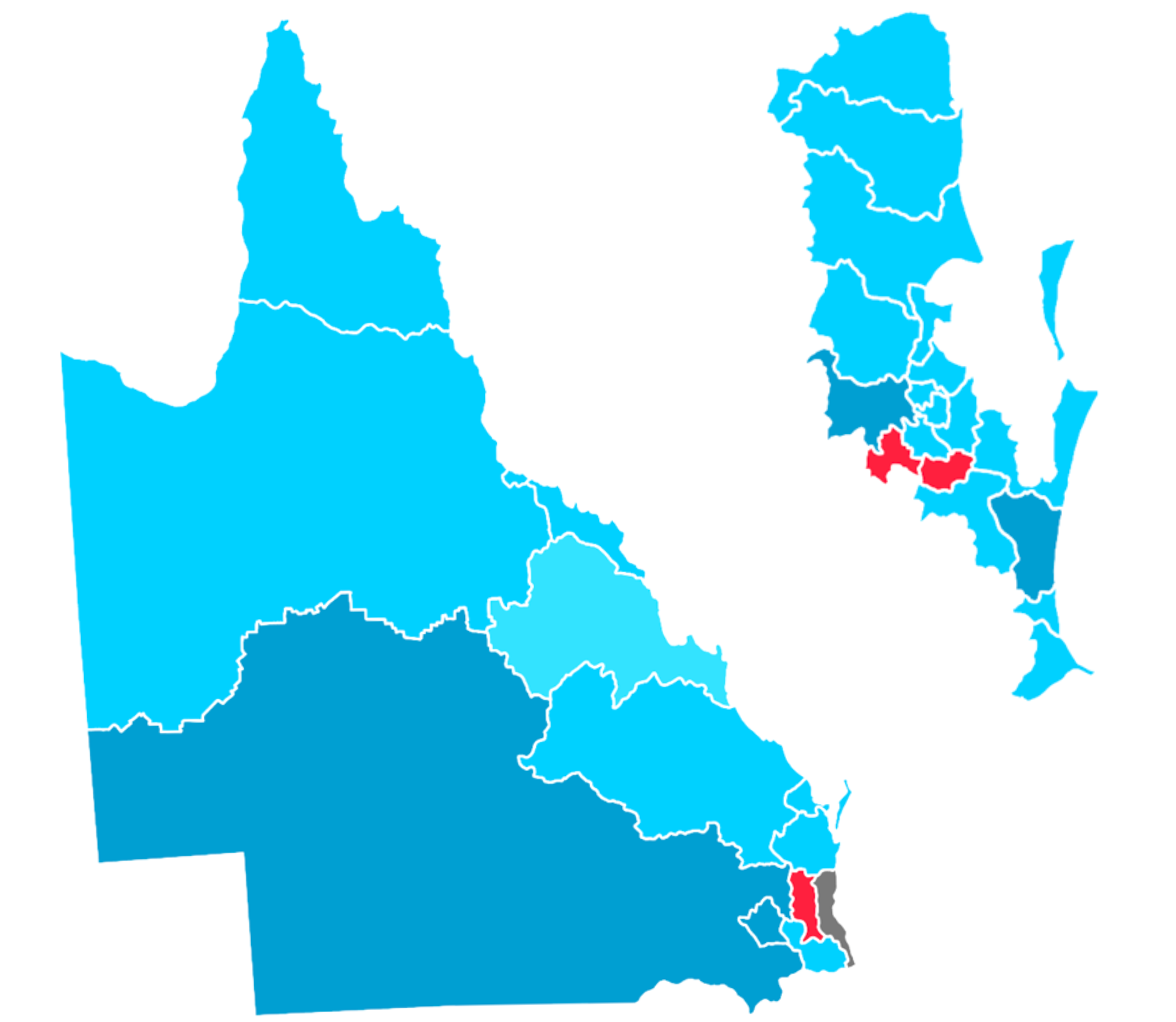
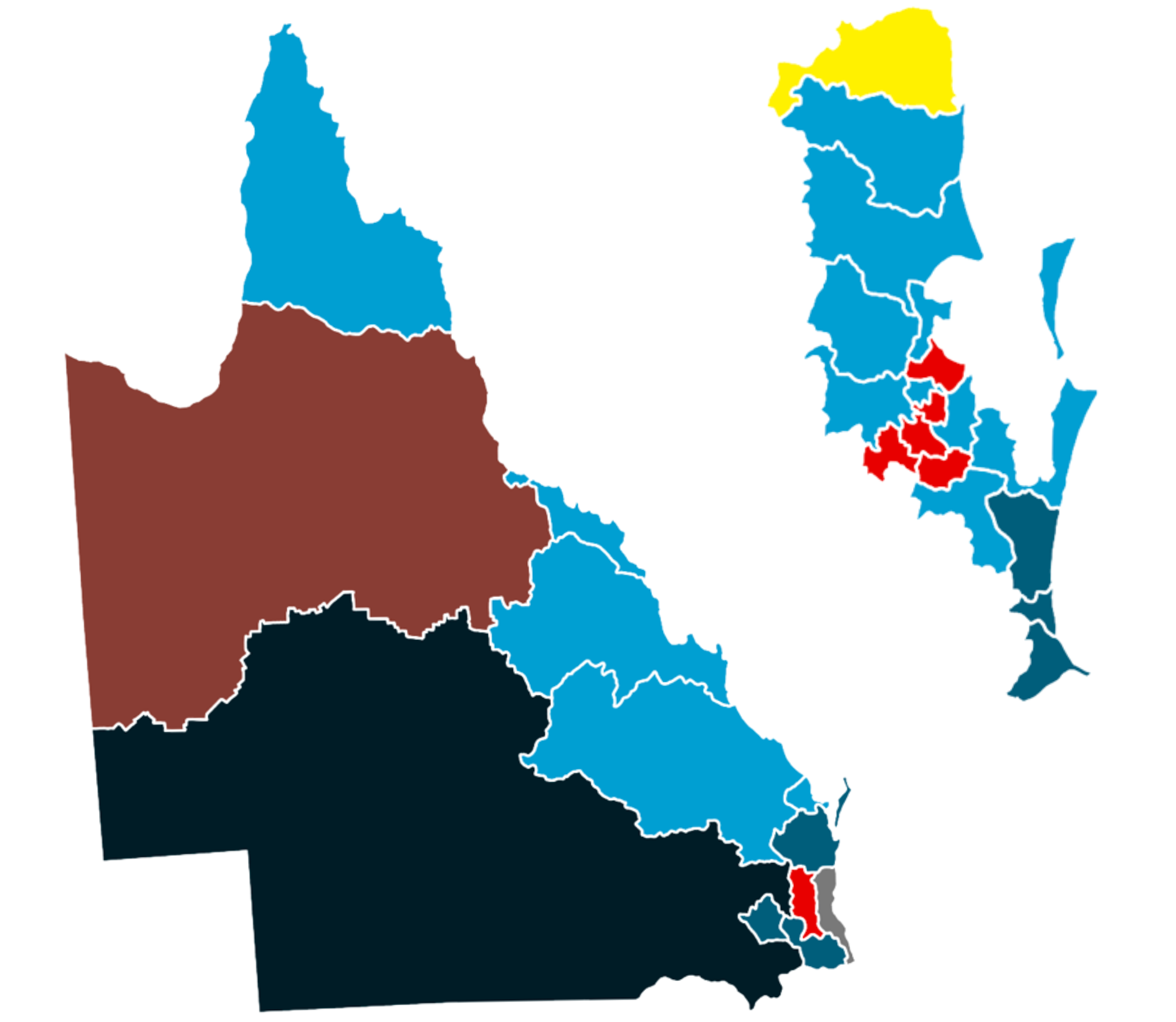

This is a list of electoral division results for the Australian 2013 federal election in the state of Queensland.

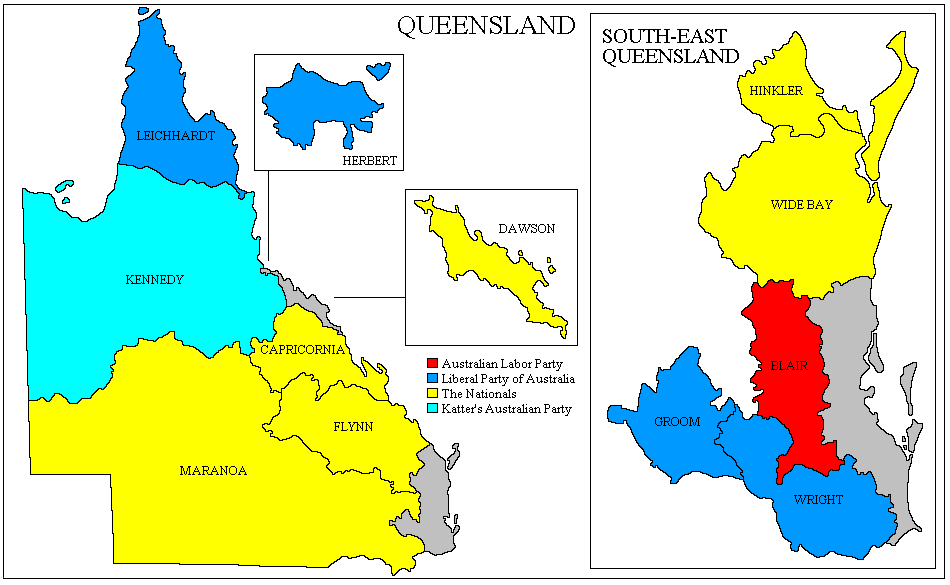
Electoral divisions: Queensland

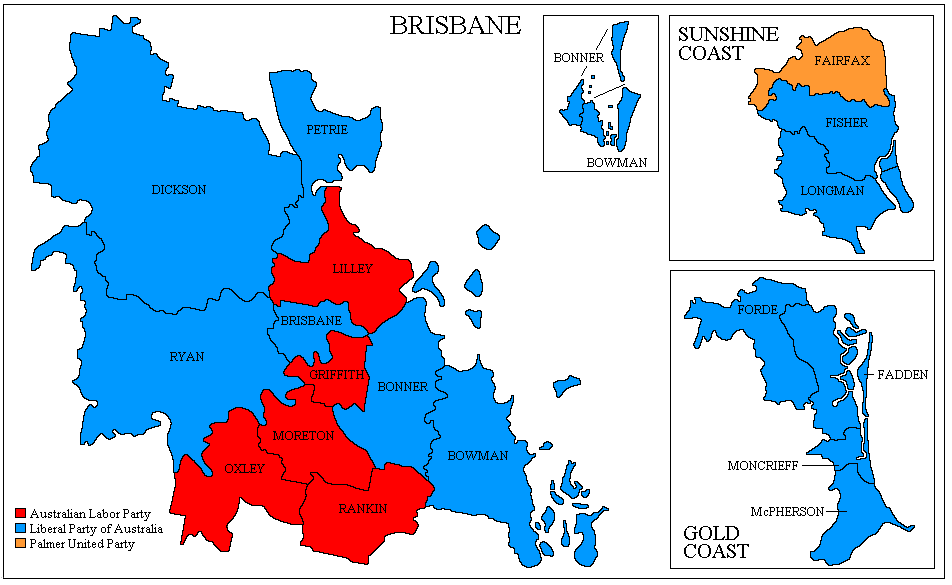
Electoral divisions: Brisbane, Sunshine Coast and Gold Coast areas

== Overall result ==
Party	Votes	%	Swing	Seats	Change
Liberal National Party	1,152,217	45.66	–1.76	22	▲1
Australian Labor Party	751,230	29.77	–3.81	6	▼2
Palmer United Party	278,125	11.02	+11.02	1	▲1
Australian Greens	156,884	6.22	–4.70		
Katter's Australian Party	94,540	3.75	+2.15	1	▲1
Family First Party	51,375	2.04	–1.85		
Rise Up Australia Party	9,889	0.39	+0.39		
Australian Sex Party	2,859	0.11	+0.11		
One Nation	2,529	0.10	−0.06		
Citizens Electoral Council	2,292	0.09	+0.03		
Australian Independents	1,901	0.08	+0.08		
Secular Party of Australia	1,808	0.07	+0.05		
Australian Voice Party	1,136	0.05	+0.05		
Democratic Labour Party	1,075	0.04	−0.15		
Australian Stable Population Party	729	0.03	+0.03		
Future Party	481	0.02	+0.02		
Uniting Australia Party	386	0.02	+0.02		
Socialist Alliance	377	0.01	−0.02		
Independents	10,435	0.41	−1.48	0	▼1
Non Affiliated	2,984	0.12	+0.09		
Total	2,523,252			30	
Two-party-preferred vote
Liberal National Party	1,437,803	56.98	+1.84	22	▲1
Australian Labor Party	1,085,449	43.02	–1.84	6	▼2

== Results by division ==
=== Blair ===
2013 Australian federal election: Blair
Party	Candidate	Votes	%	±%
Labor	Shayne Neumann	32,818	41.55	−0.53
Liberal National	Teresa Harding	26,734	33.85	−3.65
Palmer United	Anthony Stanton	9,805	12.41	+12.41
Greens	Clare Rudkin	3,359	4.25	−6.81
Katter's Australian	Dale Chorley	2,491	3.15	+3.15
Family First	Elwyn Denman	2,257	2.86	−2.05
Australian Independents	Shannon Deguara	1,011	1.28	+1.28
Rise Up Australia	Anthony Mackin	504	0.64	+0.64
Total formal votes		78,979	94.33	+0.21
Informal votes		4,749	5.67	−0.21
Turnout		83,728	94.46	+0.54
Two-party-preferred result
Labor	Shayne Neumann	43,642	55.26	+1.02
Liberal National	Teresa Harding	35,337	44.74	−1.02
Labor hold		Swing	+1.02	

=== Bonner ===
2013 Australian federal election: Bonner
Party	Candidate	Votes	%	±%
Liberal National	Ross Vasta	40,186	46.80	+0.42
Labor	Laura Fraser Hardy	30,927	36.01	−0.06
Palmer United	James MacAnally	6,712	7.82	+7.82
Greens	Dave Nelson	5,876	6.84	−4.34
Family First	Jeff Penny	1,789	2.08	−0.74
Uniting Australia	Jarrod Wirth	386	0.45	+0.45
Total formal votes		85,876	95.66	+0.77
Informal votes		3,895	4.34	−0.77
Turnout		89,771	94.02	+0.57
Two-party-preferred result
Liberal National	Ross Vasta	46,110	53.69	+0.87
Labor	Laura Fraser Hardy	39,766	46.31	−0.87
Liberal National hold		Swing	+0.87	

=== Bowman ===
2013 Australian federal election: Bowman
Party	Candidate	Votes	%	±%
Liberal National	Andrew Laming	42,828	49.28	−6.35
Labor	Darryl Briskey	25,967	29.88	−0.29
Palmer United	John Wayne	11,049	12.71	+12.71
Greens	Penny Allman-Payne	5,198	5.98	−3.99
Family First	Andrew O'Shea	1,868	2.15	−0.09
Total formal votes		86,910	95.49	+0.88
Informal votes		4,102	4.51	−0.88
Turnout		91,012	94.93	+0.63
Two-party-preferred result
Liberal National	Andrew Laming	51,155	58.86	−1.53
Labor	Darryl Briskey	35,755	41.14	+1.53
Liberal National hold		Swing	−1.53	

=== Brisbane ===
2013 Australian federal election: Brisbane
Party	Candidate	Votes	%	±%
Liberal National	Teresa Gambaro	41,681	47.99	+2.10
Labor	Fiona McNamara	26,163	30.12	−0.26
Greens	Rachael Jacobs	12,452	14.34	−6.94
Palmer United	Veronica Ford	3,643	4.19	+4.19
Katter's Australian	Connie Cicchini	951	1.09	+1.09
Family First	Sharyn Joyner	801	0.92	−0.65
Secular	Tony Rose	602	0.69	+0.69
Stable Population	John Roles	564	0.65	+0.65
Total formal votes		86,857	96.12	−0.12
Informal votes		3,504	3.88	+0.12
Turnout		90,361	92.80	+1.45
Two-party-preferred result
Liberal National	Teresa Gambaro	47,145	54.28	+3.15
Labor	Fiona McNamara	39,712	45.72	−3.15
Liberal National hold		Swing	+3.15	

=== Capricornia ===
2013 Australian federal election: Capricornia
Party	Candidate	Votes	%	±%
Liberal National	Michelle Landry	33,608	39.58	−0.84
Labor	Peter Freeleagus	31,450	37.04	−8.73
Palmer United	Derek Ison	6,747	7.95	+7.95
Katter's Australian	Robbie Williams	4,708	5.54	+5.54
Family First	Hazel Alley	3,274	3.86	+0.37
Greens	Paul Bambrick	2,910	3.43	−2.09
	Bruce Diamond	1,777	2.09	+2.09
Rise Up Australia	Paul Lewis	439	0.52	+0.52
Total formal votes		84,913	94.85	+1.00
Informal votes		4,614	5.15	−1.00
Turnout		89,527	94.83	+1.70
Two-party-preferred result
Liberal National	Michelle Landry	43,109	50.77	+4.45
Labor	Peter Freeleagus	41,804	49.23	−4.45
Liberal National gain from Labor		Swing	+4.45	

=== Dawson ===
2013 Australian federal election: Dawson
Party	Candidate	Votes	%	±%
Liberal National	George Christensen	40,507	46.23	+0.49
Labor	Bronwyn Taha	26,030	29.71	−10.33
Palmer United	Ian Ferguson	8,777	10.02	+10.02
Katter's Australian	Justin Englert	5,905	6.74	+6.74
Greens	Jonathon Dykyj	4,396	5.02	−2.70
Family First	Lindsay Temple	1,663	1.90	−3.04
Citizens Electoral Council	Andrew Harris	345	0.39	−1.16
Total formal votes		87,623	95.15	+0.91
Informal votes		4,463	4.85	−0.91
Turnout		92,086	93.80	+0.69
Two-party-preferred result
Liberal National	George Christensen	50,451	57.58	+5.15
Labor	Bronwyn Taha	37,172	42.42	−5.15
Liberal National hold		Swing	+5.15	

=== Dickson ===
2013 Australian federal election: Dickson
Party	Candidate	Votes	%	±%
Liberal National	Peter Dutton	41,163	48.01	−0.95
Labor	Michael Gilliver	26,848	31.32	−2.15
Palmer United	Mark Taverner	8,390	9.79	+9.79
Greens	Tyrone D'Lisle	5,507	6.42	−4.49
Katter's Australian	Jim Cornwell	1,697	1.98	+1.98
Family First	Michael McDowell	1,542	1.80	−1.07
Rise Up Australia	Geoffrey Taylor	585	0.68	+0.68
Total formal votes		85,732	95.74	+0.15
Informal votes		3,819	4.26	−0.15
Turnout		89,551	94.89	+0.35
Two-party-preferred result
Liberal National	Peter Dutton	48,631	56.72	+1.59
Labor	Michael Gilliver	37,101	43.28	−1.59
Liberal National hold		Swing	+1.59	

=== Fadden ===
2013 Australian federal election: Fadden
Party	Candidate	Votes	%	±%
Liberal National	Stuart Robert	42,962	53.61	−4.72
Labor	Nicole Lessio	17,804	22.22	−5.11
Palmer United	Jim Macanally	11,759	14.67	+14.67
Greens	Petrina Maizey	3,995	4.99	−4.34
Family First	Jeremy Fredericks	1,305	1.63	−1.78
Katter's Australian	Billy Lawrence	1,088	1.36	+1.36
Independent	Maurie Carroll	712	0.89	+0.89
One Nation	Stewart Boyd	510	0.64	−0.96
Total formal votes		80,135	94.21	+0.25
Informal votes		4,925	5.79	−0.25
Turnout		85,060	92.70	+0.80
Two-party-preferred result
Liberal National	Stuart Robert	51,572	64.36	+0.17
Labor	Nicole Lessio	28,563	35.64	−0.17
Liberal National hold		Swing	+0.17	

=== Fairfax ===
2013 Australian federal election: Fairfax
Party	Candidate	Votes	%	±%
Liberal National	Ted O'Brien	34,959	41.32	−8.13
Palmer United	Clive Palmer	22,409	26.49	+26.49
Labor	Elaine Hughes	15,429	18.24	−9.07
Greens	David Knobel	7,046	8.33	−9.67
Katter's Australian	Ray Sawyer	1,623	1.92	+1.92
Family First	Angela Meyer	1,416	1.67	−3.57
Independent	Trudy Byrnes	1,016	1.20	+1.20
One Nation	Mike Holt	709	0.84	+0.84
Total formal votes		84,607	94.88	−0.09
Informal votes		4,569	5.12	+0.09
Turnout		89,176	93.41	+0.63
Notional two-party-preferred count
Liberal National	Ted O'Brien	52,184	61.68	+4.73
Labor	Elaine Hughes	32,423	38.32	−4.73
Two-candidate-preferred result
Palmer United	Clive Palmer	42,330	50.03	+50.03
Liberal National	Ted O'Brien	42,277	49.97	−7.03
Palmer United gain from Liberal National				

=== Fisher ===
2013 Australian federal election: Fisher
Party	Candidate	Votes	%	±%
Liberal National	Mal Brough	34,619	44.47	−2.01
Labor	Bill Gissane	16,297	20.93	−9.39
Palmer United	William Schoch	13,559	17.42	+17.42
Greens	Garry Claridge	5,908	7.59	−8.25
Katter's Australian	Mark Meldon	2,520	3.24	+3.24
Family First	Tony Moore	1,593	2.05	−5.31
	Peter Slipper	1,207	1.55	+1.55
Independent	Jarreau Terry	957	1.23	+1.23
Australian Independents	Mark Maguire	890	1.14	+1.14
Rise Up Australia	Rod Christensen	305	0.39	+0.39
Total formal votes		77,855	94.19	−0.64
Informal votes		4,803	5.81	+0.64
Turnout		82,658	93.52	+0.76
Two-party-preferred result
Liberal National	Mal Brough	46,522	59.75	+5.62
Labor	Bill Gissane	31,333	40.25	−5.62
Liberal National hold		Swing	+5.62	

=== Flynn ===
2013 Australian federal election: Flynn
Party	Candidate	Votes	%	±%
Liberal National	Ken O'Dowd	39,362	46.02	−1.02
Labor	Chris Trevor	28,598	33.44	−6.48
Palmer United	Steven Ensby	7,908	9.25	+9.25
Katter's Australian	Richard Love	3,536	4.13	+4.13
Greens	Serena Thompson	1,890	2.21	−1.75
Independent	Craig Tomsett	1,573	1.84	+1.84
Family First	Renae Moldre	1,287	1.50	−2.99
Independent	Duncan Scott	792	0.93	−2.86
Rise Up Australia	Kingsley Dickins	584	0.68	+0.68
Total formal votes		85,530	94.76	+0.09
Informal votes		4,725	5.24	−0.09
Turnout		90,255	94.64	+2.25
Two-party-preferred result
Liberal National	Ken O'Dowd	48,352	56.53	+2.95
Labor	Chris Trevor	37,178	43.47	−2.95
Liberal National hold		Swing	+2.95	

=== Forde ===
2013 Australian federal election: Forde
Party	Candidate	Votes	%	±%
Liberal National	Bert van Manen	32,271	42.54	−1.54
Labor	Peter Beattie	25,794	34.00	−3.39
Palmer United	Blair Brewster	9,445	12.45	+12.45
Greens	Sally Spain	3,162	4.17	−8.05
Family First	Amanda Best	1,701	2.24	−4.08
Katter's Australian	Paul Hunter	1,652	2.18	+2.18
Rise Up Australia	Jonathan Jennings	745	0.98	+0.98
Independent	Joshua Sloss	698	0.92	+0.92
Australian Voice	Keith Douglas	262	0.35	+0.35
Citizens Electoral Council	Jan Pukallus	130	0.17	+0.17
Total formal votes		75,860	92.73	−0.14
Informal votes		5,948	7.27	+0.14
Turnout		81,808	92.60	+0.94
Two-party-preferred result
Liberal National	Bert van Manen	41,256	54.38	+2.75
Labor	Peter Beattie	34,604	45.62	−2.75
Liberal National hold		Swing	+2.75	

=== Griffith ===
2013 Australian federal election: Griffith
Party	Candidate	Votes	%	±%
Liberal National	Bill Glasson	36,481	42.22	+6.42
Labor	Kevin Rudd	34,878	40.36	−3.72
Greens	Geoff Ebbs	8,799	10.18	−5.21
Palmer United	Karin Hunter	2,903	3.36	+3.36
Independent	Greg Sowden	705	0.82	+0.82
Family First	Adam Kertesz	643	0.74	−0.71
Katter's Australian	Luke Murray	595	0.69	+0.69
Secular	Anne Reid	445	0.51	+0.51
Rise Up Australia	Sherrilyn Church	418	0.48	+0.48
Socialist Alliance	Liam Flenady	377	0.44	+0.44
Stable Population	Jan McNicol	165	0.19	+0.19
Total formal votes		86,409	95.24	+0.13
Informal votes		4,323	4.76	−0.13
Turnout		90,732	93.14	+1.81
Two-party-preferred result
Labor	Kevin Rudd	45,805	53.01	−5.45
Liberal National	Bill Glasson	40,604	46.99	+5.45
Labor hold		Swing	−5.45	

=== Groom ===
2013 Australian federal election: Groom
Party	Candidate	Votes	%	±%
Liberal National	Ian Macfarlane	48,966	55.64	−5.61
Labor	Troy Murray	19,451	22.10	−0.57
Palmer United	Ewen Mathieson	8,225	9.35	+9.35
Greens	Trevor Smith	3,823	4.34	−2.96
Katter's Australian	Chris Whitty	3,243	3.69	+3.69
Family First	Alex Todd	2,342	2.66	−2.90
Rise Up Australia	Rick Armitage	1,210	1.37	+1.37
Citizens Electoral Council	Robert Thies	743	0.84	+0.84
Total formal votes		88,003	96.01	+0.16
Informal votes		3,656	3.99	−0.16
Turnout		91,659	94.58	+0.16
Two-party-preferred result
Liberal National	Ian Macfarlane	58,493	66.47	−2.06
Labor	Troy Murray	29,510	33.53	+2.06
Liberal National hold		Swing	−2.06	

=== Herbert ===
2013 Australian federal election: Herbert
Party	Candidate	Votes	%	±%
Liberal National	Ewen Jones	36,952	43.34	−2.33
Labor	Cathy O'Toole	25,051	29.38	−10.77
Palmer United	Martin Brewster	7,573	8.88	+8.88
Katter's Australian	Bronwyn Walker	6,890	8.08	+8.08
Greens	Gail Hamilton	4,463	5.24	−3.61
Sex Party	Costa George	1,576	1.85	+1.85
Family First	Michael Punshon	1,106	1.30	−4.03
One Nation	Steve Moir	710	0.83	+0.83
Rise Up Australia	Nino Marolla	549	0.64	+0.64
Australian Voice	Margaret Bell	383	0.45	+0.45
Total formal votes		85,253	94.07	+0.33
Informal votes		5,379	5.93	−0.33
Turnout		90,632	93.21	+0.62
Two-party-preferred result
Liberal National	Ewen Jones	47,889	56.17	+4.00
Labor	Cathy O'Toole	37,364	43.83	−4.00
Liberal National hold		Swing	+4.00	

=== Hinkler ===
2013 Australian federal election: Hinkler
Party	Candidate	Votes	%	±%
Liberal National	Keith Pitt	38,005	44.75	−10.20
Labor	Leanne Donaldson	23,442	27.60	−4.90
Palmer United	Rob Messenger	14,990	17.65	+17.65
Katter's Australian	David Dalgleish	3,887	4.58	+4.58
Greens	Mark Simpson	2,308	2.72	−2.99
Family First	Troy Sullivan	1,590	1.87	−1.30
Independent	Reid Schirmer	706	0.83	+0.83
Total formal votes		84,928	95.08	+0.65
Informal votes		4,399	4.92	−0.65
Turnout		89,327	94.58	+0.97
Two-party-preferred result
Liberal National	Keith Pitt	50,142	59.04	−1.35
Labor	Leanne Donaldson	34,786	40.96	+1.35
Liberal National hold		Swing	−1.35	

=== Kennedy ===
2013 Australian federal election: Kennedy
Party	Candidate	Votes	%	±%
Liberal National	Noeline Ikin	34,344	40.84	+14.24
Katter's Australian	Bob Katter	24,691	29.36	−17.35
Labor	Andrew Turnour	13,777	16.38	−3.83
Palmer United	Ronald Brazier	6,419	7.63	+7.63
Greens	Jenny Stirling	2,727	3.24	−1.25
Family First	Dan Vogler	1,064	1.27	−0.73
Independent	Chester Tuxford	571	0.68	+0.68
Rise Up Australia	Pam Hecht	508	0.60	+0.60
Total formal votes		84,101	94.57	−0.05
Informal votes		4,828	5.43	+0.05
Turnout		88,929	92.26	+0.81
Notional two-party-preferred count
Liberal National	Noeline Ikin	56,476	67.15	+5.21
Labor	Andrew Turnour	27,625	32.85	−5.21
Two-candidate-preferred result
Katter's Australian	Bob Katter	43,896	52.19	−16.15
Liberal National	Noeline Ikin	40,205	47.81	+16.15
Member changed to Katter's Australian from Independent		Swing	−16.15	

=== Leichhardt ===
2013 Australian federal election: Leichhardt
Party	Candidate	Votes	%	±%
Liberal National	Warren Entsch	38,795	45.26	−2.14
Labor	Billy Gordon	27,920	32.57	−2.09
Palmer United	Bruce Gibson	7,326	8.55	+8.55
Greens	Johanna Kloot	5,646	6.59	−2.47
Katter's Australian	George Ryan	3,677	4.29	+4.29
Family First	Frank Miles	1,876	2.19	+0.36
Rise Up Australia	Dale Edwards	476	0.56	+0.56
Total formal votes		85,716	94.55	+0.46
Informal votes		4,939	5.45	−0.46
Turnout		90,655	91.20	+0.10
Two-party-preferred result
Liberal National	Warren Entsch	47,725	55.68	+1.13
Labor	Billy Gordon	37,991	44.32	−1.13
Liberal National hold		Swing	+1.13	

=== Lilley ===
2013 Australian federal election: Lilley
Party	Candidate	Votes	%	±%
Liberal National	Rod McGarvie	37,232	41.32	+0.10
Labor	Wayne Swan	36,228	40.21	−0.88
Greens	Nic Forster	6,908	7.67	−4.50
Palmer United	Benedict Figueroa	6,193	6.87	+6.87
Katter's Australian	James Ryan	1,899	2.11	+2.11
Family First	Allan Vincent	1,297	1.44	−1.66
Citizens Electoral Council	Nick Contarino	344	0.38	+0.38
Total formal votes		90,101	95.43	−0.01
Informal votes		4,314	4.57	+0.01
Turnout		94,415	94.26	+0.74
Two-party-preferred result
Labor	Wayne Swan	46,237	51.32	−1.86
Liberal National	Rod McGarvie	43,864	48.68	+1.86
Labor hold		Swing	−1.86	

=== Longman ===
2013 Australian federal election: Longman
Party	Candidate	Votes	%	±%
Liberal National	Wyatt Roy	37,570	44.84	+1.09
Labor	Michael Caisley	25,683	30.65	−6.99
Palmer United	Clemens Van Der Weegen	10,714	12.79	+12.79
Greens	Helen Fairweather	3,304	3.94	−5.18
Katter's Australian	Brad Kennedy	2,364	2.82	+2.82
Family First	Will Smith	1,977	2.36	−1.89
Sex Party	Ayla Goeytes	1,283	1.53	+1.53
Independent	Caleb Wells	895	1.07	+1.07
Total formal votes		83,790	94.93	+2.22
Informal votes		4,473	5.07	−2.22
Turnout		88,263	93.85	+0.36
Two-party-preferred result
Liberal National	Wyatt Roy	47,691	56.92	+5.00
Labor	Michael Caisley	36,099	43.08	−5.00
Liberal National hold		Swing	+5.00	

=== Maranoa ===
2013 Australian federal election: Maranoa
Party	Candidate	Votes	%	±%
Liberal National	Bruce Scott	51,622	57.42	−8.10
Labor	Nick Cedric-Thompson	14,649	16.29	−3.67
Palmer United	John Bjelke-Petersen	12,506	13.91	+13.91
Katter's Australian	Rowell Walton	5,027	5.59	+5.59
Greens	Grant Newson	2,762	3.07	−2.08
Family First	John Spellman	2,481	2.76	−1.33
Rise Up Australia	George Clouston	861	0.96	+0.96
Total formal votes		89,908	95.61	+0.55
Informal votes		4,124	4.39	−0.55
Turnout		94,032	94.40	+0.75
Two-party-preferred result
Liberal National	Bruce Scott	64,987	72.28	−0.61
Labor	Nick Cedric-Thompson	24,921	27.72	+0.61
Liberal National hold		Swing	−0.61	

=== McPherson ===
2013 Australian federal election: McPherson
Party	Candidate	Votes	%	±%
Liberal National	Karen Andrews	41,594	50.16	−3.74
Labor	Gail Hislop	18,866	22.75	−6.11
Palmer United	Susan Douglas	13,203	15.92	+15.92
Greens	David Wyatt	5,689	6.86	−5.54
Family First	Simon Green	3,084	3.72	−1.12
Australian Voice	Charles Blake	491	0.59	+0.59
Total formal votes		82,927	94.79	+0.69
Informal votes		4,559	5.21	−0.69
Turnout		87,486	92.61	+0.60
Two-party-preferred result
Liberal National	Karen Andrews	52,244	63.00	+2.72
Labor	Gail Hislop	30,683	37.00	−2.72
Liberal National hold		Swing	+2.72	

=== Moncrieff ===
2013 Australian federal election: Moncrieff
Party	Candidate	Votes	%	±%
Liberal National	Steven Ciobo	44,295	55.69	−6.16
Labor	Jason Munro	16,562	20.82	−2.66
Palmer United	Grant Pforr	10,882	13.68	+13.68
Greens	Toni McPherson	5,127	6.45	−5.11
Family First	Barrie Nicholson	1,744	2.19	−0.92
One Nation	Veronica Beric	600	0.75	+0.75
Citizens Electoral Council	Paul Spajic	330	0.41	+0.41
Total formal votes		79,540	94.27	+0.45
Informal votes		4,839	5.73	−0.45
Turnout		84,379	91.04	+0.52
Two-party-preferred result
Liberal National	Steven Ciobo	54,051	67.95	+0.46
Labor	Jason Munro	25,489	32.05	−0.46
Liberal National hold		Swing	+0.46	

=== Moreton ===
2013 Australian federal election: Moreton
Party	Candidate	Votes	%	±%
Liberal National	Malcolm Cole	34,824	42.24	−1.16
Labor	Graham Perrett	31,932	38.73	+2.72
Greens	Elissa Jenkins	8,234	9.99	−5.90
Palmer United	Jeremy Davey	4,147	5.03	+5.03
Family First	Carolyn Ferrando	1,250	1.52	−1.92
Katter's Australian	Chris Mallcott	1,070	1.30	+1.30
Future	Hayden Muscat	481	0.58	+0.58
Rise Up Australia	Bruce Fry	303	0.37	+0.37
Citizens Electoral Council	Wayne Grunert	208	0.25	+0.25
Total formal votes		82,449	94.38	−0.77
Informal votes		4,912	5.62	+0.77
Turnout		87,361	92.65	+0.78
Two-party-preferred result
Labor	Graham Perrett	42,503	51.55	+0.42
Liberal National	Malcolm Cole	39,946	48.45	−0.42
Labor hold		Swing	+0.42	

=== Oxley ===
2013 Australian federal election: Oxley
Party	Candidate	Votes	%	±%
Labor	Bernie Ripoll	32,589	43.10	−1.61
Liberal National	Andrew Nguyen	29,064	38.44	+0.09
Palmer United	Ricky Tang	5,368	7.10	+7.10
Greens	Martin Stephenson	4,072	5.38	−6.41
Family First	Carrie McCormack	1,551	2.05	−3.10
Katter's Australian	Kathleen Hewlett	1,499	1.98	+1.98
Democratic Labour	Frank Karg	1,075	1.42	+1.42
Rise Up Australia	Scott Moerland	400	0.53	+0.53
Total formal votes		75,618	93.08	−0.24
Informal votes		5,619	6.92	+0.24
Turnout		81,237	93.57	+0.95
Two-party-preferred result
Labor	Bernie Ripoll	40,657	53.77	−2.00
Liberal National	Andrew Nguyen	34,961	46.23	+2.00
Labor hold		Swing	−2.00	

=== Petrie ===
2013 Australian federal election: Petrie
Party	Candidate	Votes	%	±%
Liberal National	Luke Howarth	33,570	40.65	+0.59
Labor	Yvette D'Ath	32,630	39.52	−3.27
Palmer United	Thor Prohaska	8,422	10.20	+10.20
Greens	John Marshall	3,729	4.52	−4.58
Family First	Tasman Spence	1,774	2.15	−2.86
Katter's Australian	Chris Thomson	1,336	1.62	+1.62
Rise Up Australia	Elise Jennings	920	1.11	+1.11
Citizens Electoral Council	Geoff Cornell	192	0.23	+0.23
Total formal votes		82,573	94.80	+0.08
Informal votes		4,530	5.20	−0.08
Turnout		87,103	93.69	+0.65
Two-party-preferred result
Liberal National	Luke Howarth	41,722	50.53	+3.04
Labor	Yvette D'Ath	40,851	49.47	−3.04
Liberal National gain from Labor		Swing	+3.04	

=== Rankin ===
2013 Australian federal election: Rankin
Party	Candidate	Votes	%	±%
Labor	Jim Chalmers	35,098	42.18	−2.97
Liberal National	David Lin	30,260	36.37	−0.73
Palmer United	William Rogan	9,228	11.09	+11.09
Greens	Neil Cotter	4,405	5.29	−5.91
Family First	Chris Lawrie	2,514	3.02	−3.52
Katter's Australian	Chris Claydon	1,697	2.04	+2.04
Total formal votes		83,202	93.44	+0.93
Informal votes		5,840	6.56	−0.93
Turnout		89,042	92.27	+0.93
Two-party-preferred result
Labor	Jim Chalmers	45,580	54.78	−0.63
Liberal National	David Lin	37,622	45.22	+0.63
Labor hold		Swing	−0.63	

=== Ryan ===
2013 Australian federal election: Ryan
Party	Candidate	Votes	%	±%
Liberal National	Jane Prentice	47,366	51.68	+5.95
Labor	Damien Hamwood	23,385	25.51	+0.49
Greens	Charles Worringham	13,235	14.44	−4.52
Palmer United	Craig Gunnis	4,558	4.97	+4.97
Family First	Lisa Demedio	1,213	1.32	−0.48
Katter's Australian	Peter Walker	1,140	1.24	+1.24
Secular	Michael Sweedman	761	0.83	+0.83
Total formal votes		91,658	96.75	−0.38
Informal votes		3,078	3.25	+0.38
Turnout		94,736	94.12	+0.81
Two-party-preferred result
Liberal National	Jane Prentice	53,657	58.54	+1.38
Labor	Damien Hamwood	38,001	41.46	−1.38
Liberal National hold		Swing	+1.38	

=== Wide Bay ===
2013 Australian federal election: Wide Bay
Party	Candidate	Votes	%	±%
Liberal National	Warren Truss	41,767	48.87	−9.99
Labor	Lucy Stanton	17,697	20.71	−3.39
Palmer United	Stephen Anderson	13,574	15.88	+15.88
Greens	Joy Ringrose	5,596	6.55	−4.45
Katter's Australian	Gordon Dale	5,022	5.88	+5.88
Family First	John Chapman	1,286	1.50	−2.24
Rise Up Australia	Grace Dickins	517	0.60	+0.60
Total formal votes		85,459	95.32	+0.57
Informal votes		4,199	4.68	−0.57
Turnout		89,658	94.25	+1.35
Two-party-preferred result
Liberal National	Warren Truss	53,975	63.16	−2.45
Labor	Lucy Stanton	31,484	36.84	+2.45
Liberal National hold		Swing	−2.45	

=== Wright ===
2013 Australian federal election: Wright
Party	Candidate	Votes	%	±%
Liberal National	Scott Buchholz	38,630	47.84	−5.25
Labor	Sharon Murakami	17,267	21.39	−6.39
Palmer United	Angie Ison	11,691	14.48	+14.48
Greens	Judith Summers	4,358	5.40	−6.55
Katter's Australian	David Neuendorf	4,332	5.37	+5.37
Family First	Stephen Lynch	2,087	2.58	−1.30
Independent	Matthew Wright	1,810	2.24	+2.24
Rise Up Australia	Tony Maunder	565	0.70	+0.70
Total formal votes		80,740	94.97	+0.60
Informal votes		4,276	5.03	−0.60
Turnout		85,016	94.13	+0.45
Two-party-preferred result
Liberal National	Scott Buchholz	49,930	61.84	+1.69
Labor	Sharon Murakami	30,810	38.16	−1.69
Liberal National hold		Swing	+1.69	

== See also ==
- 2013 Australian federal election
- Results of the 2013 Australian federal election (House of Representatives)
- Post-election pendulum for the 2013 Australian federal election
- Members of the Australian House of Representatives, 2013–2016
