= Results of the 2010 Australian federal election in Queensland =

2010 Australian federal election (Queensland)
← 2007	21 August 2010	2013 →

All 30 Queensland seats in the Australian House of Representatives and 6 (of the 12) seats in the Australian Senate
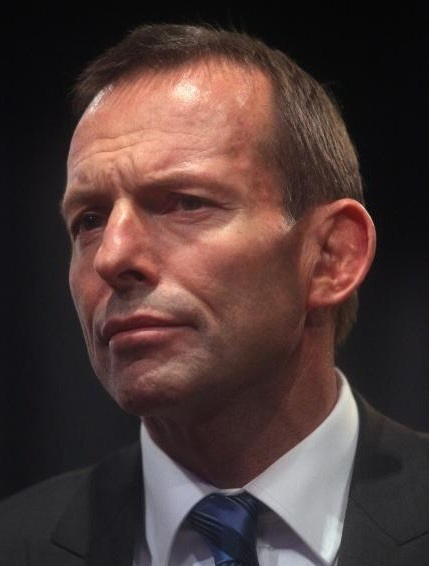

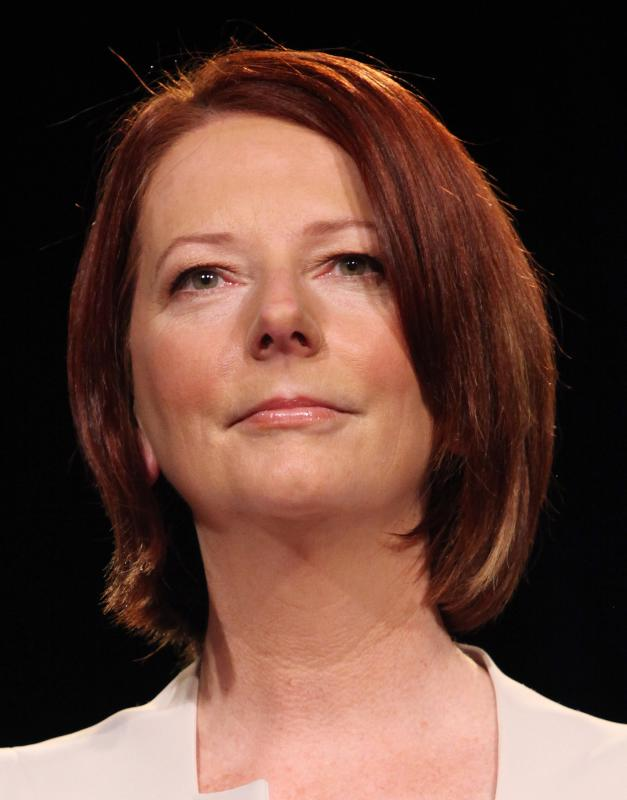
	First party	Second party
Leader	Tony Abbott	Julia Gillard
Party	Coalition	Labor
Last election	13 seats	15 seats
Seats won	21 seats	8 seats
Seat change	▲8	▼7
Popular vote	1,130,525	800,712
Percentage	47.42%	33.58%
Swing	▲2.95	▼9.33
TPP	55.14%	44.86%
TPP swing	▲5.58	▼5.58
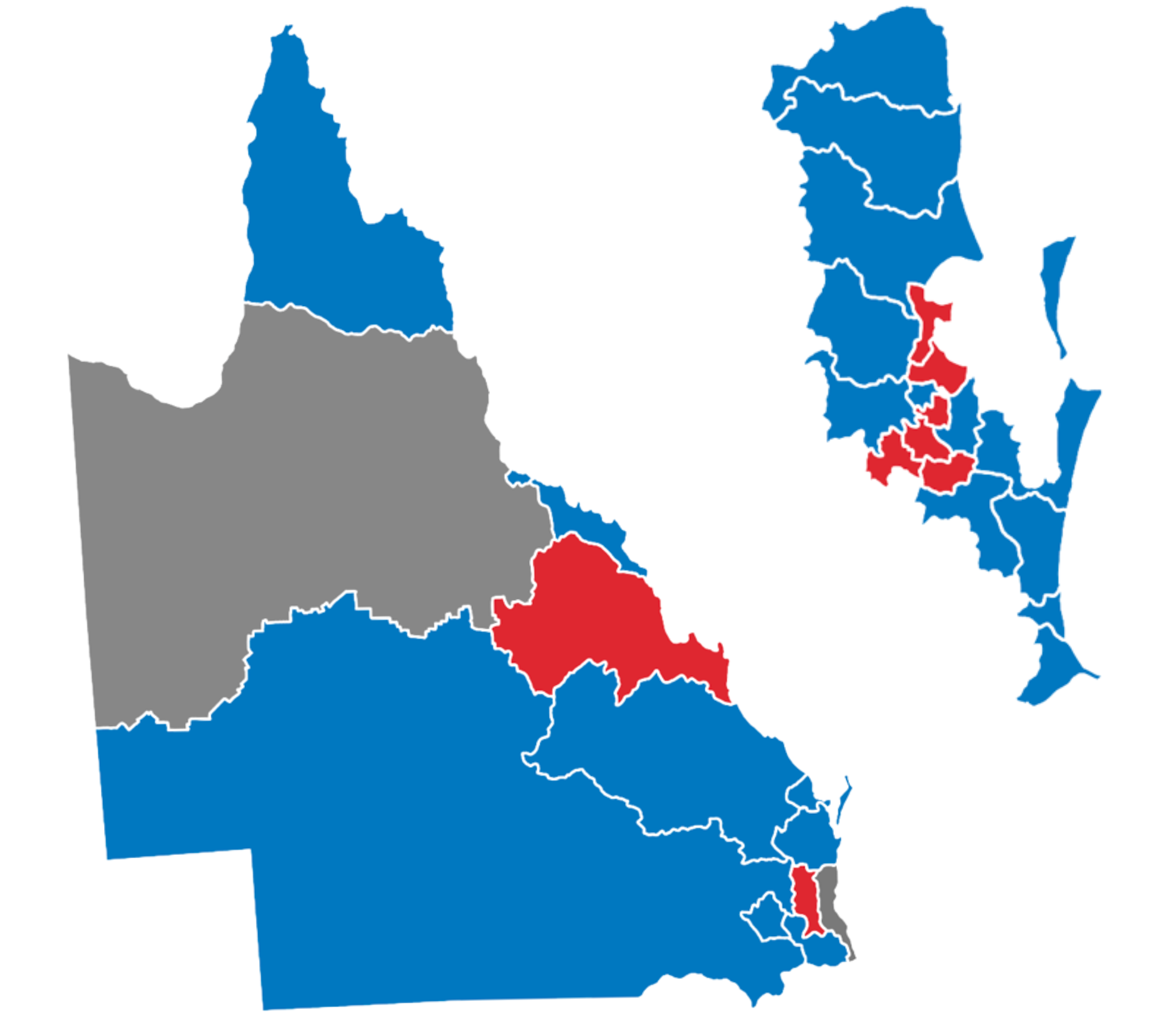
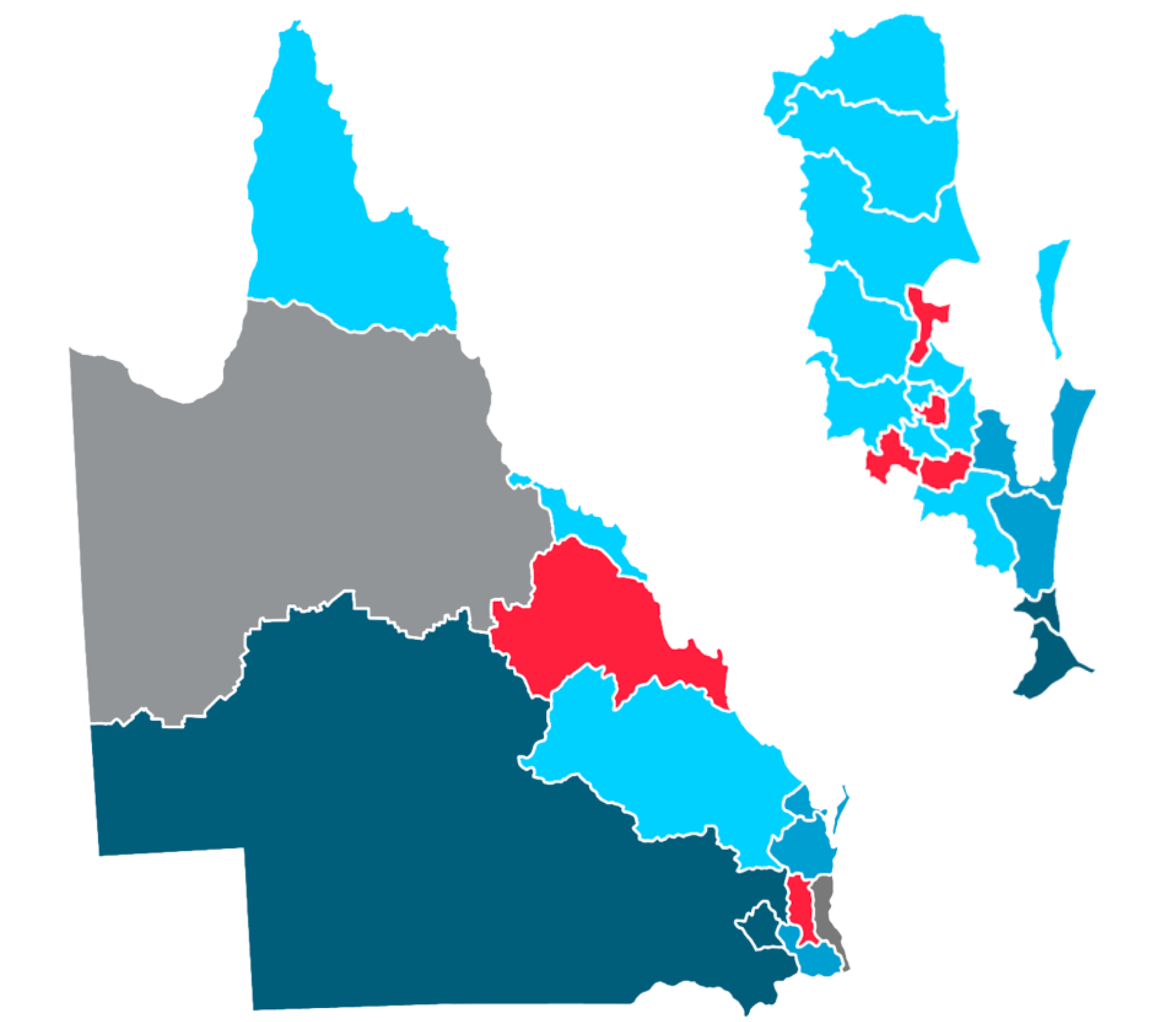
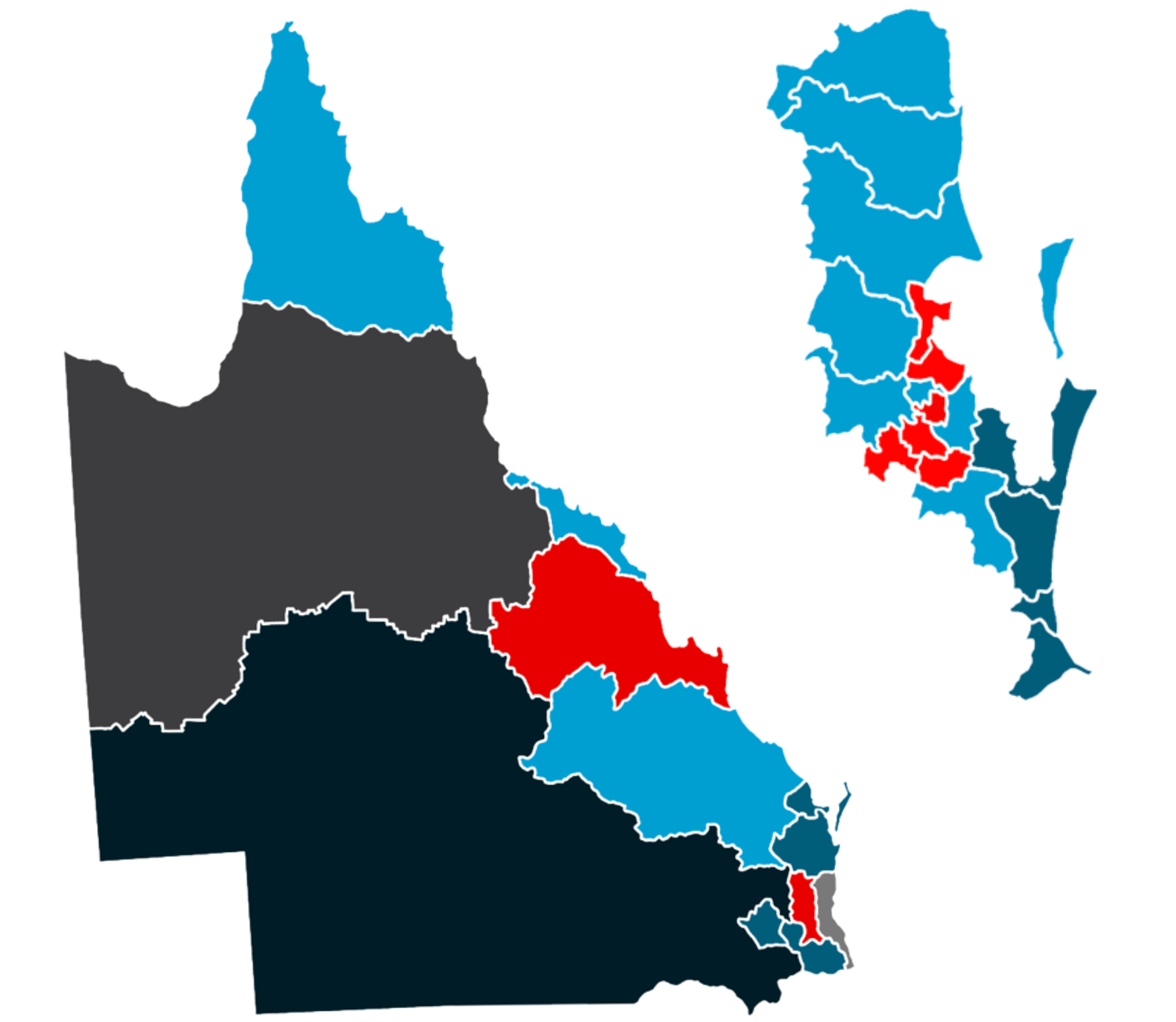

This is a list of electoral division results for the Australian 2010 federal election in the state of Queensland.

== Overall results ==
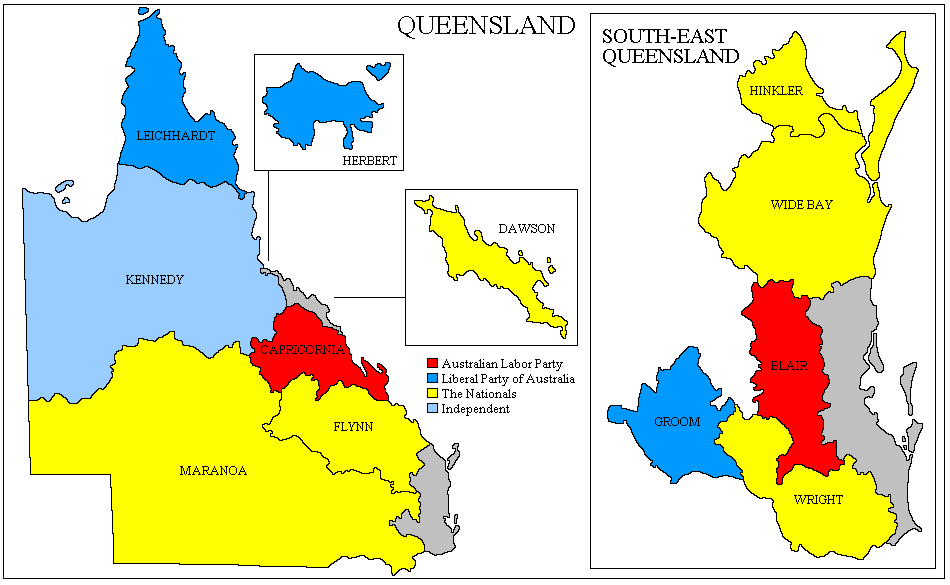
Electoral divisions: Queensland

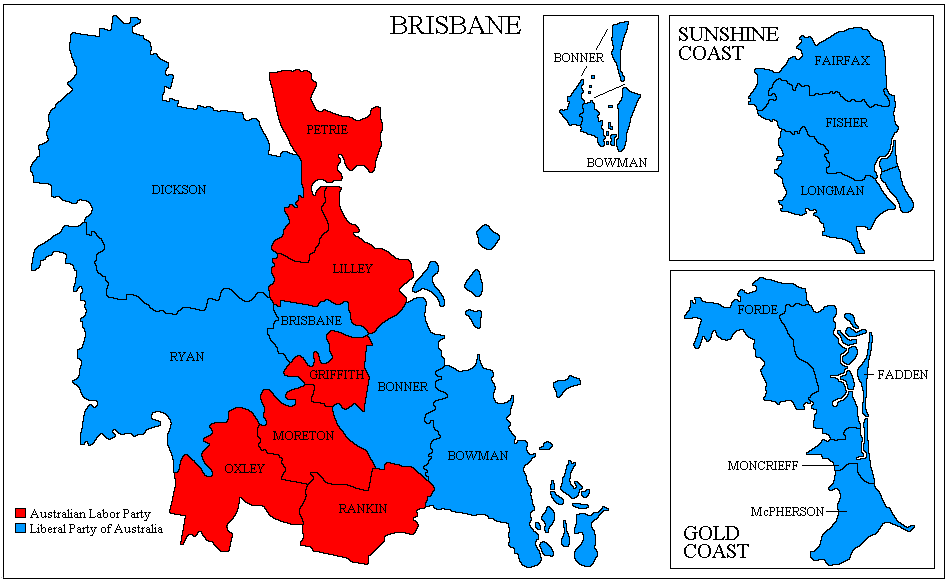
Electoral divisions: Brisbane area

Turnout 92.71% (CV) — Informal 5.45%
Party	Votes	%	Swing	Seats	Change
Liberal National Party	1,130,525	47.42	+2.95	21	▲8
Australian Labor Party	800,712	33.58	–9.33	8	▼7
Australian Greens	260,471	10.92	+5.29		
Family First Party	92,794	3.89	+1.62		
Independents	83,310	3.49	+0.50	1 (Note: The independent was Bob Katter (Kennedy).)	Steady
Liberal Democratic Party	4,662	0.20	+0.05		
Democratic Labor Party	4,590	0.19	+0.19		
One Nation	3,921	0.16	−0.20		
Citizens Electoral Council	1,462	0.06	−0.09		
Socialist Alliance	717	0.03	−0.02		
Secular Party of Australia	414	0.02	+0.02		
Others	601	0.03	+0.03		
Total	2,384,179			30	▲1 (Note: The new seat was Wright.)
Two-party-preferred vote
Liberal National Party	1,314,675	55.14	+5.58	21	▲8
Australian Labor Party	1,069,504	44.86	–5.58	8	▼7
Invalid/blank votes		137,395	5.45	+1.89	
Registered voters/turnout		2,719,360	92.73		
Source: Commonwealth Election 2010

== Results by division ==
=== Blair ===
2010 Australian federal election: Blair
Party	Candidate	Votes	%	±%
Labor	Shayne Neumann	30,890	42.08	−9.23
Liberal National	Neil Zabel	27,525	37.50	−2.11
Greens	Patricia Petersen	8,122	11.06	+6.96
Family First	Joshua Olyslagers	3,605	4.91	+2.86
Independent	Brad King	3,267	4.45	+4.45
Total formal votes		73,409	94.12	−2.03
Informal votes		4,589	5.88	+2.03
Turnout		77,998	93.89	−1.10
Two-party-preferred result
Labor	Shayne Neumann	39,814	54.24	−2.74
Liberal National	Neil Zabel	33,595	45.76	+2.74
Labor hold		Swing	−2.74	

=== Bonner ===
2010 Australian federal election: Bonner
Party	Candidate	Votes	%	±%
Liberal National	Ross Vasta	38,105	46.38	+4.47
Labor	Kerry Rea	29,639	36.07	−12.73
Greens	Darryl Rosin	9,188	11.18	+6.28
Family First	Carolyn Ferrando	2,318	2.82	+0.89
Independent	Greg Sowden	1,984	2.41	+2.41
Democratic Labor	Utz Wellner	931	1.13	+1.13
Total formal votes		82,165	94.89	−2.14
Informal votes		4,429	5.11	+2.14
Turnout		86,594	93.43	−1.90
Two-party-preferred result
Liberal National	Ross Vasta	43,400	52.82	+7.35
Labor	Kerry Rea	38,765	47.18	−7.35
Liberal National gain from Labor		Swing	+7.35	

=== Bowman ===
2010 Australian federal election: Bowman
Party	Candidate	Votes	%	±%
Liberal National	Andrew Laming	45,585	55.63	+9.51
Labor	Jenny Peters	24,719	30.17	−13.97
Greens	David Keogh	8,174	9.97	+4.51
Family First	Karina Windolf	1,834	2.24	−0.70
One Nation	Dave Chidgey	865	1.06	+0.53
Democratic Labor	John Kent	768	0.94	+0.94
Total formal votes		81,945	94.61	−2.01
Informal votes		4,672	5.39	+2.01
Turnout		86,617	94.26	−0.98
Two-party-preferred result
Liberal National	Andrew Laming	49,490	60.39	+10.39
Labor	Jenny Peters	32,455	39.61	−10.39
Liberal National hold		Swing	+10.39	

=== Brisbane ===
2010 Australian federal election: Brisbane
Party	Candidate	Votes	%	±%
Liberal National	Teresa Gambaro	37,191	45.89	+4.08
Labor	Arch Bevis	24,623	30.38	−13.22
Greens	Andrew Bartlett	17,244	21.28	+10.12
Family First	Mark White	1,274	1.57	+0.44
Socialist Alliance	Ewan Saunders	717	0.88	+0.36
Total formal votes		81,049	96.24	−0.88
Informal votes		3,169	3.76	+0.88
Turnout		84,218	91.32	−3.89
Two-party-preferred result
Liberal National	Teresa Gambaro	41,440	51.13	+5.73
Labor	Arch Bevis	39,609	48.87	−5.73
Liberal National gain from Labor		Swing	+5.73	

=== Capricornia ===
2010 Australian federal election: Capricornia
Party	Candidate	Votes	%	±%
Labor	Kirsten Livermore	36,793	45.77	−9.57
Liberal National	Michelle Landry	32,489	40.42	+3.44
Greens	Paul Bambrick	4,435	5.52	+2.52
Family First	Sandra Corneloup	2,802	3.49	+1.70
Independent	Shane Guley	2,045	2.54	+2.54
Independent	Bevan Mowen	1,402	1.74	+1.74
Secular	Steve Jeffery	414	0.52	+0.52
Total formal votes		80,380	93.85	−2.83
Informal votes		5,263	6.15	+2.83
Turnout		85,643	93.13	−2.27
Two-party-preferred result
Labor	Kirsten Livermore	43,150	53.68	−8.40
Liberal National	Michelle Landry	37,230	46.32	+8.40
Labor hold		Swing	−8.40	

=== Dawson ===
2010 Australian federal election: Dawson
Party	Candidate	Votes	%	±%
Liberal National	George Christensen	37,940	45.74	+2.62
Labor	Mike Brunker	33,216	40.04	−7.35
Greens	Jonathon Dykyj	6,406	7.72	+3.29
Family First	Damian Herrington	4,100	4.94	+2.09
Citizens Electoral Council	Bill Ingrey	1,287	1.55	+1.07
Total formal votes		82,949	94.24	−1.94
Informal votes		5,070	5.76	+1.94
Turnout		88,019	93.09	−2.32
Two-party-preferred result
Liberal National	George Christensen	43,494	52.43	+5.02
Labor	Mike Brunker	39,455	47.57	−5.02
Liberal National gain from Labor		Swing	+5.02	

=== Dickson ===
2010 Australian federal election: Dickson
Party	Candidate	Votes	%	±%
Liberal National	Peter Dutton	39,880	48.96	+3.62
Labor	Fiona McNamara	27,264	33.47	−10.95
Greens	David Colbert	8,888	10.91	+4.84
Independent	Rebecca Jenkinson	2,558	3.14	+3.14
Family First	Alan Revie	2,340	2.87	+0.35
Liberal Democrats	Bob Hunter	521	0.64	+0.34
Total formal votes		81,451	95.59	−1.62
Informal votes		3,755	4.41	+1.62
Turnout		85,206	94.56	−0.81
Two-party-preferred result
Liberal National	Peter Dutton	44,902	55.13	+5.89
Labor	Fiona McNamara	36,549	44.87	−5.89
Liberal National notional gain from Labor		Swing	+5.89	

=== Fadden ===
2010 Australian federal election: Fadden
Party	Candidate	Votes	%	±%
Liberal National	Stuart Robert	42,925	58.33	+1.72
Labor	Rana Watson	20,110	27.33	−6.24
Greens	Graeme Maizey	6,863	9.33	+4.92
Family First	Barrie Nicholson	2,513	3.41	+1.36
One Nation	Ian Rossiter	1,181	1.60	+0.79
Total formal votes		73,592	93.96	−1.73
Informal votes		4,734	6.04	+1.73
Turnout		78,326	91.89	−0.35
Two-party-preferred result
Liberal National	Stuart Robert	47,236	64.19	+3.76
Labor	Rana Watson	26,356	35.81	−3.76
Liberal National hold		Swing	+3.76	

=== Fairfax ===
2010 Australian federal election: Fairfax
Party	Candidate	Votes	%	±%
Liberal National	Alex Somlyay	39,102	49.45	+2.72
Labor	Dan McIntyre	21,589	27.31	−9.07
Greens	Narelle McCarthy	14,228	18.00	+9.31
Family First	Ron Hunt	4,147	5.24	+1.32
Total formal votes		79,066	94.97	−1.64
Informal votes		4,186	5.03	+1.64
Turnout		83,252	92.77	−0.35
Two-party-preferred result
Liberal National	Alex Somlyay	45,032	56.95	+3.98
Labor	Dan McIntyre	34,034	43.05	−3.98
Liberal National hold		Swing	+3.98	

=== Fisher ===
2010 Australian federal election: Fisher
Party	Candidate	Votes	%	±%
Liberal National	Peter Slipper	34,235	46.48	+2.28
Labor	Chris Cummins	22,332	30.32	−2.71
Greens	Garry Claridge	11,664	15.84	+9.91
Family First	Robyn Robertson	5,421	7.36	+4.88
Total formal votes		73,652	94.83	−2.36
Informal votes		4,013	5.17	+2.36
Turnout		77,665	92.73	−0.38
Two-party-preferred result
Liberal National	Peter Slipper	39,868	54.13	+0.60
Labor	Chris Cummins	33,784	45.87	−0.60
Liberal National hold		Swing	+0.60	

=== Flynn ===
2010 Australian federal election: Flynn
Party	Candidate	Votes	%	±%
Liberal National	Ken O'Dowd	37,584	47.04	+0.67
Labor	Chris Trevor	31,894	39.92	−6.78
Family First	Di Hancock-Mills	3,586	4.49	+2.48
Greens	Anne Goddard	3,163	3.96	+1.91
Independent	Duncan Scott	3,025	3.79	+2.88
Democratic Labor	John McMahon	640	0.80	+0.80
Total formal votes		79,892	94.67	−1.38
Informal votes		4,502	5.33	+1.38
Turnout		84,394	92.36	−2.75
Two-party-preferred result
Liberal National	Ken O'Dowd	42,806	53.58	+5.82
Labor	Chris Trevor	37,086	46.42	−5.82
Liberal National gain from Labor		Swing	+5.82	

=== Forde ===
2010 Australian federal election: Forde
Party	Candidate	Votes	%	±%
Liberal National	Bert van Manen	30,967	44.08	+0.01
Labor	Brett Raguse	26,268	37.39	−8.92
Greens	Petrina Maizey	8,583	12.22	+7.78
Family First	Melissa Raassina	4,440	6.32	+3.56
Total formal votes		70,258	92.87	−2.42
Informal votes		5,397	7.13	+2.42
Turnout		75,655	91.64	−1.05
Two-party-preferred result
Liberal National	Bert van Manen	36,271	51.63	+4.99
Labor	Brett Raguse	33,987	48.37	−4.99
Liberal National gain from Labor		Swing	+4.99	

=== Griffith ===
2010 Australian federal election: Griffith
Party	Candidate	Votes	%	±%
Labor	Kevin Rudd	35,445	44.08	−9.01
Liberal National	Rebecca Docherty	28,784	35.80	+1.82
Greens	Emma-Kate Rose	12,378	15.39	+7.54
Liberal Democrats	Gregory Romans	1,866	2.32	+2.10
Family First	Jesse Webb	1,163	1.45	+0.66
Revolutionary Socialist	Hamish Chitts	601	0.75	+0.75
Citizens Electoral Council	Jan Pukallus	175	0.22	+0.22
Total formal votes		80,412	95.11	−2.01
Informal votes		4,137	4.89	+2.01
Turnout		84,549	91.32	−2.30
Two-party-preferred result
Labor	Kevin Rudd	47,007	58.46	−3.86
Liberal National	Rebecca Docherty	33,405	41.54	+3.86
Labor hold		Swing	−3.86	

=== Groom ===
2010 Australian federal election: Groom
Party	Candidate	Votes	%	±%
Liberal National	Ian Macfarlane	51,757	61.25	+8.54
Labor	Chris Meibusch	19,153	22.67	−12.16
Greens	Frida Forsberg	6,165	7.30	+2.46
Family First	Rose Kirkwood	4,696	5.56	+1.18
Independent	Rod Jeanneret	2,730	3.23	+2.63
Total formal votes		84,501	95.85	−1.09
Informal votes		3,655	4.15	+1.09
Turnout		88,156	94.41	−1.05
Two-party-preferred result
Liberal National	Ian Macfarlane	57,912	68.53	+10.31
Labor	Chris Meibusch	26,589	31.47	−10.31
Liberal National hold		Swing	+10.31	

=== Herbert ===
2010 Australian federal election: Herbert
Party	Candidate	Votes	%	±%
Liberal National	Ewen Jones	36,086	45.67	+2.14
Labor	Tony Mooney	31,729	40.15	−3.12
Greens	Mike Rubenach	6,995	8.85	+3.81
Family First	Michael Punshon	4,208	5.33	+3.67
Total formal votes		79,018	93.74	−2.04
Informal votes		5,281	6.26	+2.04
Turnout		84,299	92.59	−1.07
Two-party-preferred result
Liberal National	Ewen Jones	41,221	52.17	+2.20
Labor	Tony Mooney	37,797	47.83	−2.20
Liberal National notional gain from Labor		Swing	+2.20	

=== Hinkler ===
2010 Australian federal election: Hinkler
Party	Candidate	Votes	%	±%
Liberal National	Paul Neville	44,382	54.95	+8.67
Labor	Belinda McNeven	26,246	32.50	−10.57
Greens	Jenny Fitzgibbon	4,611	5.71	+1.63
Family First	Trevor Versace	2,562	3.17	−0.37
Independent	Adrian Wone	1,698	2.10	+2.10
Independent	Cy D'Oliveira	1,264	1.57	+1.57
Total formal votes		80,763	94.43	−1.67
Informal votes		4,765	5.57	+1.67
Turnout		85,528	93.58	−0.89
Two-party-preferred result
Liberal National	Paul Neville	48,770	60.39	+8.87
Labor	Belinda McNeven	31,993	39.61	−8.87
Liberal National hold		Swing	+8.87	

=== Kennedy ===
2010 Australian federal election: Kennedy
Party	Candidate	Votes	%	±%
Independent	Bob Katter	38,170	46.71	+9.91
Liberal National	Ed Morrison	21,737	26.60	+0.30
Labor	Andrew Turnour	16,513	20.21	−8.78
Greens	Jess Jones	3,669	4.49	+1.11
Family First	Fred Dykstra	1,633	2.00	+0.02
Total formal votes		81,722	94.62	−1.44
Informal votes		4,648	5.38	+1.44
Turnout		86,370	91.43	−2.47
Notional two-party-preferred count
Liberal National	Ed Morrison	50,616	61.94	+4.65
Labor	Andrew Turnour	31,106	38.06	−4.65
Two-candidate-preferred result
Independent	Bob Katter	55,852	68.34	+2.05
Liberal National	Ed Morrison	25,870	31.66	+31.66
Independent hold		Swing	+2.05	

=== Leichhardt ===
2010 Australian federal election: Leichhardt
Party	Candidate	Votes	%	±%
Liberal National	Warren Entsch	37,828	47.40	+4.66
Labor	Jim Turnour	27,662	34.66	−8.37
Greens	Neville St John-Wood	7,232	9.06	+1.44
Independent	Jen Sackley	2,556	3.20	+3.20
Independent	Yodie Batzke	1,700	2.13	+2.13
Family First	Shannon McSweeney	1,461	1.83	+0.53
Independent	Steve Lane	1,373	1.72	+1.72
Total formal votes		79,812	94.09	−0.89
Informal votes		5,017	5.91	+0.89
Turnout		84,829	91.08	−1.38
Two-party-preferred result
Liberal National	Warren Entsch	43,539	54.55	+8.61
Labor	Jim Turnour	36,273	45.45	−8.61
Liberal National gain from Labor		Swing	+8.61	

=== Lilley ===
2010 Australian federal election: Lilley
Party	Candidate	Votes	%	±%
Liberal National	Rod McGarvie	35,835	41.22	+2.39
Labor	Wayne Swan	35,724	41.09	−10.19
Greens	Andrew Jeremijenko	10,579	12.17	+5.81
Family First	Andrew Herschell	2,696	3.10	+1.32
Independent	Douglas Crowhurst	2,111	2.43	+2.43
Total formal votes		86,945	95.44	−1.61
Informal votes		4,153	4.56	+1.61
Turnout		91,098	93.52	−2.33
Two-party-preferred result
Labor	Wayne Swan	46,234	53.18	−4.77
Liberal National	Rod McGarvie	40,711	46.82	+4.77
Labor hold		Swing	−4.77	

=== Longman ===
2010 Australian federal election: Longman
Party	Candidate	Votes	%	±%
Liberal National	Wyatt Roy	33,011	43.75	−1.17
Labor	Jon Sullivan	28,396	37.64	−8.04
Greens	Rod Blair	6,878	9.12	+4.64
Family First	Claire McErlane	3,206	4.25	+2.46
Independent	John Reece	1,042	1.38	+1.38
Independent	Bob Fox	872	1.16	+1.16
Independent	Michael van Boeckel	856	1.13	+1.13
Liberal Democrats	Joshua van Veen	671	0.89	+0.51
Democratic Labor	Andrew Jackson	518	0.69	+0.69
Total formal votes		75,450	92.71	−3.77
Informal votes		5,929	7.29	+3.77
Turnout		81,379	93.47	+0.19
Two-party-preferred result
Liberal National	Wyatt Roy	39,173	51.92	+3.79
Labor	Jon Sullivan	36,277	48.08	−3.79
Liberal National gain from Labor		Swing	+3.79	

=== Maranoa ===
2010 Australian federal election: Maranoa
Party	Candidate	Votes	%	±%
Liberal National	Bruce Scott	57,100	65.52	+7.00
Labor	Geoff Keating	17,398	19.96	−9.94
Independent	Charles Nason	4,597	5.28	+5.28
Greens	Grant Newson	4,490	5.15	+1.94
Family First	Greg McKay	3,560	4.09	+0.35
Total formal votes		87,145	95.06	−1.26
Informal votes		4,530	4.94	+1.26
Turnout		91,675	93.59	−1.33
Two-party-preferred result
Liberal National	Bruce Scott	63,520	72.89	+8.83
Labor	Geoff Keating	23,625	27.11	−8.83
Liberal National hold		Swing	+8.83	

=== McPherson ===
2010 Australian federal election: McPherson
Party	Candidate	Votes	%	±%
Liberal National	Karen Andrews	42,069	53.90	−0.93
Labor	Dan Byron	22,526	28.86	−6.99
Greens	Ben O'Callaghan	9,676	12.40	+6.49
Family First	Matthew Reeves	3,777	4.84	+3.33
Total formal votes		78,048	94.10	−2.73
Informal votes		4,890	5.90	+2.73
Turnout		82,938	92.06	−2.67
Two-party-preferred result
Liberal National	Karen Andrews	47,044	60.28	+1.63
Labor	Dan Byron	31,004	39.72	−1.63
Liberal National hold		Swing	+1.63	

=== Moncrieff ===
2010 Australian federal election: Moncrieff
Party	Candidate	Votes	%	±%
Liberal National	Steven Ciobo	46,832	61.85	+2.27
Labor	Robert Hough	17,776	23.48	−6.71
Greens	Sally Spain	8,756	11.56	+5.34
Family First	James Tayler	2,351	3.11	+1.36
Total formal votes		75,715	93.82	−2.37
Informal votes		4,985	6.18	+2.37
Turnout		80,700	90.59	−3.98
Two-party-preferred result
Liberal National	Steven Ciobo	51,103	67.49	+3.69
Labor	Robert Hough	24,612	32.51	−3.69
Liberal National hold		Swing	+3.69	

=== Moreton ===
2010 Australian federal election: Moreton
Party	Candidate	Votes	%	±%
Liberal National	Malcolm Cole	35,182	43.40	+2.56
Labor	Graham Perrett	29,190	36.01	−12.12
Greens	Elissa Jenkins	12,882	15.89	+8.74
Family First	Steve Christian	2,787	3.44	+1.97
Democratic Labor	Lee Nightingale	1,018	1.26	+1.26
Total formal votes		81,059	95.15	−1.69
Informal votes		4,128	4.85	+1.69
Turnout		85,187	91.86	−3.16
Two-party-preferred result
Labor	Graham Perrett	41,447	51.13	−4.88
Liberal National	Malcolm Cole	39,612	48.87	+4.88
Labor hold		Swing	−4.88	

=== Oxley ===
2010 Australian federal election: Oxley
Party	Candidate	Votes	%	±%
Labor	Bernie Ripoll	31,985	44.71	−10.91
Liberal National	Tarnya Smith	27,431	38.35	+2.97
Greens	Des Hoban	8,436	11.79	+6.49
Family First	Timothy Stieler	3,682	5.15	+3.18
Total formal votes		71,534	93.32	−2.62
Informal votes		5,123	6.68	+2.62
Turnout		76,657	92.60	−0.81
Two-party-preferred result
Labor	Bernie Ripoll	39,894	55.77	−5.57
Liberal National	Tarnya Smith	31,640	44.23	+5.57
Labor hold		Swing	−5.57	

=== Petrie ===
2010 Australian federal election: Petrie
Party	Candidate	Votes	%	±%
Labor	Yvette D'Ath	32,677	42.79	−6.27
Liberal National	Dean Teasdale	30,590	40.06	−2.76
Greens	Peter Jeremijenko	6,949	9.10	+4.68
Family First	Sally Vincent	3,829	5.01	+3.14
Liberal Democrats	Gabriel Buckley	1,604	2.10	+1.79
Democratic Labor	Lawrence Addison	715	0.94	+0.94
Total formal votes		76,364	94.72	−2.06
Informal votes		4,253	5.28	+2.06
Turnout		80,617	93.00	−1.10
Two-party-preferred result
Labor	Yvette D'Ath	40,097	52.51	−1.70
Liberal National	Dean Teasdale	36,267	47.49	+1.70
Labor hold		Swing	−1.70	

=== Rankin ===
2010 Australian federal election: Rankin
Party	Candidate	Votes	%	±%
Labor	Craig Emerson	36,090	45.15	−10.98
Liberal National	Luke Smith	29,652	37.10	+2.63
Greens	Neil Cotter	8,956	11.20	+6.61
Family First	Alexandra Todd	5,231	6.54	+3.44
Total formal votes		79,929	92.51	−3.06
Informal votes		6,475	7.49	+3.06
Turnout		86,404	91.33	−2.38
Two-party-preferred result
Labor	Craig Emerson	44,289	55.41	−6.26
Liberal National	Luke Smith	35,640	44.59	+6.26
Labor hold		Swing	−6.26	

=== Ryan ===
2010 Australian federal election: Ryan
Party	Candidate	Votes	%	±%
Liberal National	Jane Prentice	40,713	45.73	−1.16
Labor	Steven Miles	22,274	25.02	−13.54
Greens	Sandra Bayley	16,884	18.96	+9.08
Independent	Michael Johnson	7,563	8.49	+8.49
Family First	Allan Vincent	1,600	1.80	+0.27
Total formal votes		89,034	97.13	−0.72
Informal votes		2,631	2.87	+0.72
Turnout		91,665	93.32	−2.43
Two-party-preferred result
Liberal National	Jane Prentice	50,896	57.16	+5.95
Labor	Steven Miles	38,138	42.84	−5.95
Liberal National hold		Swing	+5.95	

=== Wide Bay ===
2010 Australian federal election: Wide Bay
Party	Candidate	Votes	%	±%
Liberal National	Warren Truss	47,977	58.86	+10.25
Labor	Nikolee Ansell	19,645	24.10	−6.87
Greens	Jim McDonald	8,967	11.00	+2.96
Family First	Ken Herschell	3,049	3.74	+0.29
One Nation	Santo Ferraro	1,875	2.30	+1.09
Total formal votes		81,513	94.75	−1.25
Informal votes		4,519	5.25	+1.25
Turnout		86,032	92.87	−1.66
Two-party-preferred result
Liberal National	Warren Truss	53,484	65.61	+7.22
Labor	Nikolee Ansell	28,029	34.39	−7.22
Liberal National hold		Swing	+7.22	

=== Wright ===
2010 Australian federal election: Wright
Party	Candidate	Votes	%	±%
Liberal National	Scott Buchholz	40,031	53.09	+1.47
Labor	Andrew Ramsay	20,946	27.78	−10.74
Greens	Anna Bridle	9,010	11.95	+6.99
Family First	Jeremy Fredericks	2,923	3.88	+1.78
Independent	Ken Degen	2,497	3.31	+3.31
Total formal votes		75,407	94.37	−1.85
Informal votes		4,497	5.63	+1.85
Turnout		79,904	93.67	+0.09
Two-party-preferred result
Liberal National	Scott Buchholz	45,358	60.15	+6.36
Labor	Andrew Ramsay	30,049	39.85	−6.36
Liberal National notional hold		Swing	+6.36	

== See also ==
- 2010 Australian federal election
- Results of the 2010 Australian federal election (House of Representatives)
- Post-election pendulum for the 2010 Australian federal election
- Members of the Australian House of Representatives, 2010–2013
