= Kate Flanders =

Australian political campaigner

Secretary of the Queensland Labor Party
- In office 3 June 2022 – 30 June 2025
- Leader: Annastacia Palaszczuk; Steven Miles
- President: John Battams; Fiona McNamara
- Preceded by: Julie-Ann Campbell
- Succeeded by: Ben Driscoll

Personal details
- Born: Katherine Flanders Mackay, Queensland, Australia
- Party: Labor
- Education: University of Queensland (LLB)
- Occupation: Industrial officer; Union official; Political campaigner
- Website: Kate Flanders – Labor

Katherine Flanders, known as Kate Flanders, is the former State Secretary of the Queensland Labor Party in Australia. She has held the position since 3 June 2022, taking over from Julie-Ann Campbell. Prior to the position with the party, Flanders worked for the Together Union, where she held the position of Assistant Branch Secretary from 2010 to 2020/21 She has also worked for the Australian Council of Trade Unions (ACTU) and was an administrative officer in private hospitals as well as a research assistant at Griffith University. Flanders holds a degree in law from the University of Queensland, and was born in Mackay, Queensland.

She served as Queensland State Secretary of the Labor Party, from June 2022 to June 2025.
