= Julie-Ann Campbell =

Australian politician

Julie-Ann Campbell MP

Member of the Australian Parliament for Moreton
- Incumbent
- Assumed office 3 May 2025
- Preceded by: Graham Perrett

Secretary of the Queensland Labor Party
- In office 29 January 2018 – 3 June 2022
- Deputy: Zac Beers
- Leader: Annastacia Palaszczuk
- Preceded by: Evan Moorhead
- Succeeded by: Kate Flanders

Personal details
- Born: 14 August 1986 (age 40) South Brisbane, Queensland, Australia
- Citizenship: Australian; Canadian (until 2024)
- Party: Labor
- Spouse: Mark
- Children: 1
- Education: University of Queensland
- Occupation: Policy advisor; Lawyer; Trade unionist

Julie-Ann Patricia Campbell (born 14 August 1986) is an Australian politician and trade unionist who has served as MP for the Division of Moreton since the 2025 Australian federal election. Previously she served as the Secretary of the Queensland branch of the Australian Labor Party from 2018 to 2022.

Campbell was president of the University of Queensland Union during 2007 and later graduated with degrees in Law and Arts (Hons). Campbell was admitted to the Supreme Court of Queensland in 2012, was a policy advisor in the Queensland Government and Industrial Officer at the Australian Manufacturing Workers Union (AMWU). Most recently, she was an associate partner at global consultancy firm Ernst & Young.

Previously the party's vice president, Campbell is the first woman to become secretary, the party's most senior executive position.

As a branch member of the ALP in 2013, Campbell moved a motion (which was subsequently ratified) at Labor's annual conference that the Labor Parliamentary Leader be elected by rank and file members.

Campbell was a dual citizen of Canada and Australia by birth until she renounced her Canadian citizenship effective 2 November 2024.

Parliament of Australia
Preceded by Graham Perrett	Member for Moreton; 2025–present	Incumbent
