= Gary Hardgrave =

Australian politician

The Honourable Gary Hardgrave

Administrator of Norfolk Island
- In office 1 July 2014 – 31 March 2017
- Monarch: Elizabeth II
- Governor-General: Sir Peter Cosgrove
- Preceded by: Neil Pope
- Succeeded by: Eric Hutchinson

Minister for Vocational and Technical Education
- In office 26 October 2004 – 23 January 2007
- Prime Minister: John Howard
- Preceded by: New position
- Succeeded by: Andrew Robb

Minister for Citizenship and Multicultural Affairs
- In office 26 November 2001 – 26 October 2004
- Prime Minister: John Howard
- Preceded by: New position
- Succeeded by: Peter McGauran

Member of the Australian Parliament for Moreton
- In office 2 March 1996 – 24 November 2007
- Preceded by: Garrie Gibson
- Succeeded by: Graham Perrett

Personal details
- Born: 5 January 1960 (age 66) Caringbah, New South Wales, Australia
- Party: Liberal
- Education: Griffith University
- Occupation: Broadcaster; Politician

Gary Douglas Hardgrave (born 5 January 1960) is an Australian former politician who served in the House of Representatives from 1996 to 2007, representing the Liberal Party. He was a minister in the Howard government from 2001 to 2007, and later served as Administrator of Norfolk Island from 2014 to 2017.

== Early life ==
Hardgrave was born on 5 January 1960 in Sydney, New South Wales, and was educated at Griffith University, Queensland. In the 1970s he began his career as a radio broadcaster, and a TV reporter firstly with the Australian children's television show Wombat between 1979 and 1982. Between 1982 and 1986, he reported for award-winning Queensland TV programme State Affair, in 1987 for ABC TV's The 7.30 Report before returning to BTQ 7 in 1988 as a senior reporter for Carroll at Seven. In 1989, he was the founding news director for SEA-FM Gold Coast and later worked as a media adviser to Liberal politicians, before entering politics.

== Politics ==
Hardgrave initially ran for election to the Queensland state seat of Sunnybank in the 1992 election, but lost. He contested the Division of Moreton successfully at the 1996 federal election against Labor incumbent Garrie Gibson, going on to retain the seat in 1998, 2001 and 2004.

Hardgrave served as Minister for Citizenship and Multicultural Affairs from 2001 to 2004, Minister for Vocational and Technical Education between October 2004 to early 2007 and Minister Assisting the Prime Minister from 7 October 2003 to 30 January 2007. On 23 January 2007, Hardgrave was axed from the ministry and returned to the backbench. He lost his seat to Graham Perrett in the 2007 election.

== Career after politics ==
In March 2008, Hardgrave returned to media and corporate activities. From January 2011, he hosted talk-back in Brisbane.

Since leaving Parliament, Hardgrave graduated from the Australian Institute of Company Directors' course and served on a variety of company and community boards including Brisbane Airport Corporation and TAFE Queensland. In January 2014, he left full-time radio but commenced a weekly column in the Queensland Sunday Mail newspaper before resigning media and corporate activities in June 2014.

On the advice of the Abbott government, Australian Governor-General Sir Peter Cosgrove appointed Hardgrave as the 37th Administrator of the Australian External Territory of Norfolk Island. His term commenced on 1 July 2014, and he was Administrator when Norfolk Island lost its self-governing status.

He later went on to host a ‘Sky After Dark’ political opinion show on conservative television station Sky News Australia, where he is a regular critic of among other things, Labor Party MPs and action on climate change. Since September 2024, he has hosted the drive slot on 4BC.

Parliament of Australia
Preceded by Garrie Gibson	Member for Moreton; 1996–2007	Succeeded by Graham Perrett
Political offices
New ministry	Minister for Citizenship and Multicultural Affairs; 2001–2004	Succeeded by Peter McGauran
Preceded by Brendan Nelson as Minister for Education, Science and Training	Minister for Vocational and Technical Education; 2004–2007	Succeeded by Andrew Robb
Government offices
Preceded by Neil Pope	Administrator of Norfolk Island; 2014–2017	Succeeded by Eric Hutchinson
