= Graham Perrett =

Australian politician (born 1966)

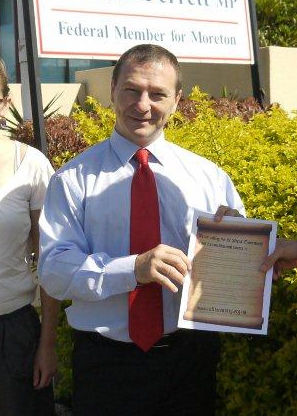
- Perrett in 2013

Member of the Australian Parliament for Moreton
- In office 24 November 2007 – 28 March 2025
- Preceded by: Gary Hardgrave
- Succeeded by: Julie-Ann Campbell

Personal details
- Born: 5 January 1966 (age 60) St George, Queensland, Australia
- Party: Australian Labor Party
- Children: 2
- Education: University of Queensland; Queensland University of Technology
- Occupation: Solicitor
- Website: www.grahamperrett.net.au

Graham Douglas Perrett (born 5 January 1966) is an Australian former politician who was a member of the House of Representatives from 2007 to 2025, representing the Queensland seat of Moreton for the Australian Labor Party (ALP). He worked as a schoolteacher, solicitor, and political staffer before entering parliament.

== Early life ==
Perrett was born in St George in Queensland in 1966 (seventh child in a family of ten children), and received a diploma of teaching in 1985. He taught for three years in schools on the Darling Downs and Far North Queensland, then another eight years in Brisbane.

In 1993, Perrett completed a BA (Hons) through the University of Queensland. His thesis was a study of The Autobiography of Malcolm X. He later received an LL.B. from Queensland University of Technology in 1999. He worked as a solicitor of the Supreme Court of Queensland from 1999 to 2005 in Quinn & Scattini. After working with the Queensland Independent Education Union as an organiser he was given a role as a senior policy adviser to the Premier of Queensland, Peter Beattie, in 2005, and later for the Minister for Health, Stephen Robertson.

== Politics ==
Perrett ran unsuccessfully for the federal seat of Moreton in 2004. He was elected to Moreton at the 2007 election where he ended Gary Hardgrave's 11-year term in office with a 7.6-point swing. Perrett described the victory as surprising, stating "In my wildest dreams I certainly didn't expect that the seat would be decided as early as it was". Perrett claimed the victory, over a former multicultural affairs minister, could be put down to the fact that "people are ready for hope and aren't prepared to stick with the tired old fear factor of John Howard".

In the 2007 Moreton campaign Perrett's rival, Gary Hardgrave, complained of being branded a "racist", after the standing member said that Moreton was being "exhausted" by the influx of African refugees. Perrett campaigned primarily on issues relating to health and education in the lead up to the election, whilst Hardgrave focused primarily on roads, according to a radio interview.

In 2011, Perrett stated he would quit parliament to force a by-election if there was a leadership change in the party. At the time, the party leader and Prime Minister was Julia Gillard, and the party was governing as a minority government. The threat was criticised by cabinet minister Anthony Albanese as a "one-morning wonder". Gillard was eventually replaced by Kevin Rudd in June 2013, but Perrett did not resign from parliament as previously stated.

Perrett was appointed as a government whip in May 2013, holding the position until Labor's defeat at the 2013 election. He was appointed as a shadow parliamentary secretary in Bill Shorten's shadow ministry in May 2014 and was also reappointed as a whip in August 2016. Perrett remained as a shadow assistant minister under Anthony Albanese when he replaced Shorten as leader in June 2019. He was not included in the Albanese ministry after Labor won the 2022 election, but was appointed chair of the Joint Statutory Committee on Public Works.

In August 2024, Perrett announced that he would not re-contest his seat at the 2025 federal election.

== Personal life ==
Perrett lives in Moorooka, Queensland with his wife Lea and has two sons.

Perrett published his first novel, The Twelfth Fish, in October 2008. The sex scenes in The Twelfth Fish drew attention from the political class and the media. In the lead-up to the 2010 federal election a Christian group put out a flyer calling Perrett the "Member for Porn". He retained his seat and went on to publish a sequel in September 2013, The Big Fig.

In his teaching days Perrett played in a band called Once I Killed a Gopher with a Stick and remains a fan of music and literature. He enjoys writing and bushwalking.

Perrett attracted international attention and ridicule after tweeting about facial injuries he suffered while watching an episode of political satire Veep. Perrett suffered a black eye and received three stitches in his cheek after knocking himself unconscious.

== Electoral history ==
House of Representatives
Year	Electorate	Party	First preference result				Two candidate result			
Year	Electorate	Party	Votes	%	±%	Position	Votes	%	±%	Result
2004	Moreton	Labor	30,828	39.12	▲0.14	Second	36,118	45.83	▼1.61	Not Elected
2007	Moreton	Labor	37,908	47.11	▲7.27	First	44,055	54.75	▲7.58	Elected
2010	Moreton	Labor	29,190	36.01	▼12.12	Second	41,147	51.13	▼4.88	Elected
2013	Moreton	Labor	31,932	38.73	▲2.72	Second	42,503	51.55	▲0.42	Elected
2016	Moreton	Labor	31,342	36.90	▼1.83	Second	45,892	54.02	▲2.47	Elected
2019	Moreton	Labor	31,864	35.15	▼1.60	Second	47,045	51.90	▼2.12	Elected
2022	Moreton	Labor	34,633	37.42	▲2.27	First	54,690	59.09	▲7.19	Elected

Parliament of Australia
Preceded by Gary Hardgrave	Member for Moreton; 2007–2025	Succeeded by Julie-Ann Campbell
