= Post-election pendulum for the 2004 Australian federal election =

The Mackerras pendulum as a way of predicting the outcome of an election contested between two major parties in a Westminster style lower house legislature such as the Australian House of Representatives, which is composed of single-member electorates and which uses a preferential voting system such as a Condorcet method or instant-runoff voting.

The pendulum works by lining up all of the seats held in Parliament for the government, the opposition and the crossbenches according to the percentage point margin they are held by on a two party preferred basis. This is also known as the swing required for the seat to change hands. Given a uniform swing to the opposition or government parties, the number of seats that change hands can be predicted.

Government seats (87)
Marginal
Kingston	SA	Kym Richardson	LIB	0.07
Bonner	Qld	Ross Vasta	LIB	0.51
Greenway	NSW	Louise Markus	LIB	0.58
Wakefield	SA	David Fawcett	LIB	0.67
Makin	SA	Trish Draper	LIB	0.93
Braddon	Tas	Mark Baker	LIB	1.13
Hasluck	WA	Stuart Henry	LIB	1.82
Stirling	WA	Michael Keenan	LIB	2.04
Eden-Monaro	NSW	Gary Nairn	LIB	2.14
Bass	Tas	Michael Ferguson	LIB	2.63
Solomon	NT	Dave Tollner	CLP	2.81
Moreton	Qld	Gary Hardgrave	LIB	4.17
Page	NSW	Ian Causley	NAT	4.23
Bennelong	NSW	John Howard	LIB	4.33
Hinkler	Qld	Paul Neville	NAT	4.81
Deakin	Vic	Phil Barresi	LIB	4.97
McMillan	Vic	Russell Broadbent	LIB	4.99
Lindsay	NSW	Jackie Kelly	LIB	5.26
Corangamite	Vic	Stewart McArthur	LIB	5.32
Boothby	SA	Andrew Southcott	LIB	5.37
Wentworth	NSW	Malcolm Turnbull	LIB	5.48
La Trobe	Vic	Jason Wood	LIB	5.83
Dobell	NSW	Ken Ticehurst	LIB	5.90
Fairly safe
Herbert	Qld	Peter Lindsay	LIB	6.20
Kalgoorlie	WA	Barry Haase	LIB	6.30
McEwen	Vic	Fran Bailey	LIB	6.42
Cowper	NSW	Luke Hartsuyker	NAT	6.45
Sturt	SA	Christopher Pyne	LIB	6.80
Robertson	NSW	Jim Lloyd	LIB	6.81
Paterson	NSW	Bob Baldwin	LIB	6.97
Longman	Qld	Mal Brough	LIB	7.66
Gippsland	Vic	Peter McGauran	NAT	7.70
Dickson	Qld	Peter Dutton	LIB	7.83
Petrie	Qld	Teresa Gambaro	LIB	7.92
Higgins	Vic	Peter Costello	LIB	8.76
Macquarie	NSW	Kerry Bartlett	LIB	8.92
Bowman	Qld	Andrew Laming	LIB	9.12
Dunkley	Vic	Bruce Billson	LIB	9.38
Macarthur	NSW	Pat Farmer	LIB	9.51
Canning	WA	Don Randall	LIB	9.54
Kooyong	Vic	Petro Georgiou	LIB	9.58
Leichhardt	Qld	Warren Entsch	LIB	10.00
Safe
North Sydney	NSW	Joe Hockey	LIB	10.03
Goldstein	Vic	Andrew Robb	LIB	10.03
Gilmore	NSW	Joanna Gash	LIB	10.08
Dawson	Qld	De-Anne Kelly	NAT	10.38
Ryan	Qld	Michael Johnson	LIB	10.42
Forrest	WA	Geoff Prosser	LIB	10.45
Warringah	NSW	Tony Abbott	LIB	10.48
Menzies	Vic	Kevin Andrews	LIB	10.67
Fairfax	Qld	Alex Somlyay	LIB	10.83
Moore	WA	Mal Washer	LIB	10.83
Hughes	NSW	Danna Vale	LIB	11.04
Flinders	Vic	Greg Hunt	LIB	11.11
Blair	Qld	Cameron Thompson	LIB	11.21
Casey	Vic	Tony Smith	LIB	11.35
Tangney	WA	Dennis Jensen	LIB	11.75
Mayo	SA	Alexander Downer	LIB	11.81 v IND
Berowra	NSW	Philip Ruddock	LIB	12.16
Wannon	Vic	David Hawker	LIB	12.37
Wide Bay	Qld	Warren Truss	NAT	12.89
Pearce	WA	Judi Moylan	LIB	12.94
Fisher	Qld	Peter Slipper	LIB	12.98
Forde	Qld	Kay Elson	LIB	12.98
Lyne	NSW	Mark Vaile	NAT	13.03
Aston	Vic	Chris Pearce	LIB	13.15
Cook	NSW	Bruce Baird	LIB	13.82
Grey	SA	Barry Wakelin	LIB	13.82
McPherson	Qld	Margaret May	LIB	13.89
Hume	NSW	Alby Schultz	LIB	14.13
Parkes	NSW	John Cobb	NAT	14.40
Curtin	WA	Julie Bishop	LIB	14.62
Fadden	Qld	David Jull	LIB	15.28
Mackellar	NSW	Bronwyn Bishop	LIB	15.75
Indi	Vic	Sophie Panopoulos	LIB	16.29
Gwydir	NSW	John Anderson	NAT	18.39
Bradfield	NSW	Brendan Nelson	LIB	18.51
Groom	Qld	Ian Macfarlane	LIB	18.95
Farrer	NSW	Sussan Ley	LIB	19.82
Barker	SA	Patrick Secker	LIB	19.88
Very safe
Moncrieff	Qld	Steven Ciobo	LIB	20.14
O'Connor	WA	Wilson Tuckey	LIB	20.39
Riverina	NSW	Kay Hull	NAT	20.66
Mitchell	NSW	Alan Cadman	LIB	20.68
Maranoa	Qld	Bruce Scott	NAT	20.93
Murray	Vic	Sharman Stone	LIB	24.08
Mallee	Vic	John Forrest	NAT	24.75

Opposition seats (60)
Marginal
Hindmarsh	SA	Steve Georganas	ALP	0.06
Swan	WA	Kim Wilkie	ALP	0.08
Richmond	NSW	Justine Elliot	ALP	0.19
Parramatta	NSW	Julie Owens	ALP	0.77
Cowan	WA	Graham Edwards	ALP	0.78
Bendigo	Vic	Steve Gibbons	ALP	0.96
Banks	NSW	Daryl Melham	ALP	1.06
Adelaide	SA	Kate Ellis	ALP	1.33
Isaacs	Vic	Ann Corcoran	ALP	1.48
Holt	Vic	Anthony Byrne	ALP	1.51
Ballarat	Vic	Catherine King	ALP	2.23
Chisholm	Vic	Anna Burke	ALP	2.65
Rankin	Qld	Craig Emerson	ALP	3.23
Lowe	NSW	John Murphy	ALP	3.30
Bruce	Vic	Alan Griffin	ALP	3.48
Lyons	Tas	Dick Adams	ALP	3.68
Melbourne Ports	Vic	Michael Danby	ALP	3.74
Brisbane	Qld	Arch Bevis	ALP	3.90
Jagajaga	Vic	Jenny Macklin	ALP	4.40
Brand	WA	Kim Beazley	ALP	4.65
Capricornia	Qld	Kirsten Livermore	ALP	5.14
Lilley	Qld	Wayne Swan	ALP	5.27
Corio	Vic	Gavan O'Connor	ALP	5.64
Fairly safe
Perth	WA	Stephen Smith	ALP	6.73
Prospect	NSW	Chris Bowen	ALP	7.12
Hotham	Vic	Simon Crean	ALP	7.40
Barton	NSW	Robert McClelland	ALP	7.54
Franklin	Tas	Harry Quick	ALP	7.59
Lingiari	NT	Warren Snowdon	ALP	7.66
Fremantle	WA	Carmen Lawrence	ALP	7.76
Charlton	NSW	Kelly Hoare	ALP	7.92
Calwell	Vic	Maria Vamvakinou	ALP	8.19
Griffith	Qld	Kevin Rudd	ALP	8.63
Lalor	Vic	Julia Gillard	ALP	8.79
Kingsford Smith	NSW	Peter Garrett	ALP	9.01
Werriwa	NSW	Mark Latham	ALP	9.31
Maribyrnong	Vic	Bob Sercombe	ALP	9.47
Shortland	NSW	Jill Hall	ALP	9.49
Canberra	ACT	Annette Ellis	ALP	9.62
Oxley	Qld	Bernie Ripoll	ALP	9.72
Newcastle	NSW	Sharon Grierson	ALP	9.98
Safe
Cunningham	NSW	Sharon Bird	ALP	11.46
Reid	NSW	Laurie Ferguson	ALP	12.77
Blaxland	NSW	Michael Hatton	ALP	12.87
Port Adelaide	SA	Rod Sawford	ALP	12.91
Chifley	NSW	Roger Price	ALP	12.98
Denison	Tas	Duncan Kerr	ALP	13.29
Fraser	ACT	Bob McMullan	ALP	13.33
Hunter	NSW	Joel Fitzgibbon	ALP	13.75
Scullin	Vic	Harry Jenkins	ALP	14.79
Gorton	Vic	Brendan O'Connor	ALP	14.90
Gellibrand	Vic	Nicola Roxon	ALP	14.95
Throsby	NSW	Jennie George	ALP	15.00
Watson	NSW	Tony Burke	ALP	15.14
Sydney	NSW	Tanya Plibersek	ALP	16.42
Wills	Vic	Kelvin Thomson	ALP	16.90
Very safe
Melbourne	Vic	Lindsay Tanner	ALP	21.14
Batman	Vic	Martin Ferguson	ALP	21.32
Fowler	NSW	Julia Irwin	ALP	21.36
Grayndler	NSW	Anthony Albanese	ALP	22.60
Crossbench seats (3)
Kennedy	Qld	Bob Katter	IND	18.88 v ALP
New England	NSW	Tony Windsor	IND	21.00 v NAT
Calare	NSW	Peter Andren	IND	21.24 v LIB
