= Post-election pendulum for the 1998 Australian federal election =

The Mackerras pendulum as a way of predicting the outcome of an election contested between two major parties in a Westminster style lower house legislature such as the Australian House of Representatives, which is composed of single-member electorates and which uses a preferential voting system such as a Condorcet method or instant-runoff voting.

The pendulum works by lining up all of the seats held in Parliament for the government, the opposition and the crossbenches according to the percentage point margin they are held by on a two party preferred basis. This is also known as the swing required for the seat to change hands. Given a uniform swing to the opposition or government parties, the number of seats that change hands can be predicted.

Government seats (80)
Marginal
Herbert	Qld	Peter Lindsay	LIB	0.10
Eden-Monaro	NSW	Gary Nairn	LIB	0.18
Hinkler	Qld	Paul Neville	NAT	0.34
Moreton	Qld	Gary Hardgrave	LIB	0.57
Petrie	Qld	Teresa Gambaro	LIB	0.75
Richmond	NSW	Larry Anthony	NAT	0.77
Adelaide	SA	Trish Worth	LIB	0.91
Longman	Qld	Mal Brough	LIB	0.92
Makin	SA	Trish Draper	LIB	0.94
La Trobe	Vic	Bob Charles	LIB	0.99
McEwen	Vic	Fran Bailey	LIB	1.04
Parramatta	NSW	Ross Cameron	LIB	1.07
Hindmarsh	SA	Chris Gallus	LIB	1.23
Lindsay	NSW	Jackie Kelly	LIB	1.28
Mayo	SA	Alexander Downer	LIB	1.74 v DEM
Deakin	Vic	Phil Barresi	LIB	1.93
Robertson	NSW	Jim Lloyd	LIB	2.01
Dunkley	Vic	Bruce Billson	LIB	2.04
Kalgoorlie	WA	Barry Haase	LIB	2.10
Page	NSW	Ian Causley	NAT	2.36
Ballarat	Vic	Michael Ronaldson	LIB	2.77
Wide Bay	Qld	Warren Truss	NAT	2.86
Blair	Qld	Cameron Thompson	LIB	3.40 v ONP
Flinders	Vic	Peter Reith	LIB	3.72
Gilmore	NSW	Joanna Gash	LIB	4.04
Leichhardt	Qld	Warren Entsch	LIB	4.05
Macquarie	NSW	Kerry Bartlett	LIB	4.10
Parkes	NSW	Tony Lawler	NAT	4.11
Aston	Vic	Peter Nugent	LIB	4.24
Fairfax	Qld	Alex Somlyay	LIB	4.36
Dawson	Qld	De-Anne Kelly	NAT	4.42
Corangamite	Vic	Stewart McArthur	LIB	4.50
Casey	Vic	Michael Wooldridge	LIB	4.87
Forde	Qld	Kay Elson	LIB	5.25
Pearce	WA	Judi Moylan	LIB	5.30
Menzies	Vic	Kevin Andrews	LIB	5.40
Hughes	NSW	Danna Vale	LIB	5.52
Macarthur	NSW	John Fahey	LIB	5.63
Tangney	WA	Daryl Williams	LIB	5.90
Fairly safe
Bennelong	NSW	John Howard	LIB	6.03
Moore	WA	Mal Washer	LIB	6.04
Wentworth	NSW	Andrew Thomson	LIB	6.32
Cowper	NSW	Garry Nehl	NAT	6.36
Forrest	WA	Geoff Prosser	LIB	6.88
Sturt	SA	Christopher Pyne	LIB	7.29
Wannon	Vic	David Hawker	LIB	7.44
Boothby	SA	Andrew Southcott	LIB	7.45
Fadden	Qld	David Jull	LIB	7.59
Grey	SA	Barry Wakelin	LIB	8.04
Hume	NSW	Alby Schultz	LIB	8.06
Goldstein	Vic	David Kemp	LIB	8.15
McPherson	Qld	Margaret May	LIB	8.34
Gippsland	Vic	Peter McGauran	NAT	8.83
Cook	NSW	Bruce Baird	LIB	8.94
Ryan	Qld	John Moore	LIB	9.52
Higgins	Vic	Peter Costello	LIB	9.62
Lyne	NSW	Mark Vaile	NAT	9.72
Safe
Indi	Vic	Lou Lieberman	LIB	10.11
Fisher	Qld	Peter Slipper	LIB	11.00
Kennedy	Qld	Bob Katter	NAT	11.19
Kooyong	Vic	Petro Georgiou	LIB	11.39
North Sydney	NSW	Joe Hockey	LIB	12.22
Moncrieff	Qld	Kathy Sullivan	LIB	12.83
New England	NSW	Stuart St. Clair	NAT	12.93
Warringah	NSW	Tony Abbott	LIB	12.93
Groom	Qld	Ian Macfarlane	LIB	13.04
Curtin	WA	Julie Bishop	LIB	13.28
Berowra	NSW	Philip Ruddock	LIB	13.52
Gwydir	NSW	John Anderson	NAT	13.58
Barker	SA	Patrick Secker	LIB	13.74
Maranoa	Qld	Bruce Scott	NAT	14.42
Farrer	NSW	Tim Fischer	NAT	14.62
O'Connor	WA	Wilson Tuckey	LIB	15.14
Riverina	NSW	Kay Hull	NAT	15.30
Mackellar	NSW	Bronwyn Bishop	LIB	15.64
Wakefield	SA	Neil Andrew	LIB	16.26
Mallee	Vic	John Forrest	NAT	19.37
Mitchell	NSW	Alan Cadman	LIB	19.85
Very safe
Murray	Vic	Sharman Stone	LIB	22.06
Bradfield	NSW	Brendan Nelson	LIB	23.20

Opposition seats (67)
Marginal
Bass	Tas	Michelle O'Byrne	ALP	0.06
Dickson	Qld	Cheryl Kernot	ALP	0.12
Kingston	SA	David Cox	ALP	0.47
Northern Territory	NT	Warren Snowdon	ALP	0.57
McMillan	Vic	Christian Zahra	ALP	0.57
Stirling	WA	Jann McFarlane	ALP	1.04
Paterson	NSW	Bob Horne	ALP	1.22
Chisholm	Vic	Anna Burke	ALP	2.07
Griffith	Qld	Kevin Rudd	ALP	2.43
Swan	WA	Kim Wilkie	ALP	2.70
Lilley	Qld	Wayne Swan	ALP	3.13
Bowman	Qld	Con Sciacca	ALP	3.29
Dobell	NSW	Michael Lee	ALP	3.35
Bendigo	Vic	Steve Gibbons	ALP	3.47
Canning	WA	Jane Gerick	ALP	3.52
Cowan	WA	Graham Edwards	ALP	3.56
Braddon	Tas	Sid Sidebottom	ALP	4.33
Brisbane	Qld	Arch Bevis	ALP	4.59
Lowe	NSW	John Murphy	ALP	4.63
Capricornia	Qld	Kirsten Livermore	ALP	5.29
Melbourne Ports	Vic	Michael Danby	ALP	5.83
Jagajaga	Vic	Jenny Macklin	ALP	5.91
Fairly safe
Isaacs	Vic	Greg Wilton	ALP	6.40
Franklin	Tas	Harry Quick	ALP	6.60
Bruce	Vic	Alan Griffin	ALP	6.72
Bank	NSW	Daryl Melham	ALP	7.11
Burke	Vic	Neil O'Keefe	ALP	7.61
Oxley	Qld	Bernie Ripoll	ALP	8.20
Rankin	Qld	Craig Emerson	ALP	8.69
Barton	NSW	Robert McClelland	ALP	9.76
Greenway	NSW	Frank Mossfield	ALP	9.94
Safe
Fremantle	WA	Carmen Lawrence	ALP	10.02
Canberra	ACT	Annette Ellis	ALP	10.06
Lyons	Tas	Dick Adams	ALP	10.61
Corio	Vic	Gavan O'Connor	ALP	11.36
Brand	WA	Kim Beazley	ALP	12.29
Werriwa	NSW	Mark Latham	ALP	12.67
Shortland	NSW	Jill Hall	ALP	12.81
Charlton	NSW	Kelly Hoare	ALP	12.97
Perth	WA	Stephen Smith	ALP	13.28
Kingsford Smith	NSW	Laurie Brereton	ALP	13.40
Hotham	Vic	Simon Crean	ALP	13.56
Denison	Tas	Duncan Kerr	ALP	14.51
Bonython	SA	Martyn Evans	ALP	14.53
Hunter	NSW	Joel Fitzgibbon	ALP	14.69
Fraser	ACT	Bob McMullan	ALP	14.86
Holt	Vic	Anthony Byrne	ALP	15.11
Port Adelaide	SA	Rod Sawford	ALP	16.10
Sydney	NSW	Tanya Plibersek	ALP	16.89
Newcastle	NSW	Allan Morris	ALP	17.33 v GRN (Note: Supplementary election)
Watson	NSW	Leo McLeay	ALP	17.47
Cunningham	NSW	Stephen Martin	ALP	18.20
Calwell	Vic	Andrew Theophanous	ALP	18.98
Prospect	NSW	Janice Crosio	ALP	19.71
Lalor	Vic	Julia Gillard	ALP	19.82
Very safe
Chifley	NSW	Roger Price	ALP	20.89
Wills	Vic	Kelvin Thomson	ALP	20.96
Reid	NSW	Laurie Ferguson	ALP	21.64
Melbourne	Vic	Lindsay Tanner	ALP	21.80
Scullin	Vic	Harry Jenkins	ALP	21.84
Blaxland	NSW	Michael Hatton	ALP	22.06
Maribyrnong	Vic	Bob Sercombe	ALP	22.06
Grayndler	NSW	Anthony Albanese	ALP	22.32
Throsby	NSW	Colin Hollis	ALP	22.46
Gellibrand	Vic	Nicola Roxon	ALP	25.91
Fowler	NSW	Julia Irwin	ALP	26.33
Batman	Vic	Martin Ferguson	ALP	26.43
Crossbench seats (1)
Calare	NSW	Peter Andren	IND	22.31 v ALP
