= Results of the 2004 Australian federal election in South Australia =

2004 Australian federal election (South Australia)
← 2001	9 October 2004	2007 →

All 11 South Australian seats in the Australian House of Representatives and 6 seats in the Australian Senate

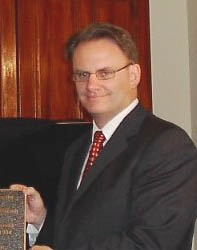
	First party	Second party
Leader	John Howard	Mark Latham
Party	Liberal/National coalition	Labor
Last election	9 seats	3 seats
Seats won	8 seats	3 seats
Seat change	▼1	Steady
Popular vote	455,983	346,071
Percentage	48.42%	36.75%
Swing	▲2.51	▲3.01
TPP	54.36%	45.64%
TPP swing	▲0.28	▼0.28

This is a list of electoral division results for the Australian 2004 federal election in the state of South Australia.

== Overall results ==
Turnout 94.79% (CV) — Informal 5.56%
Party	Votes	%	Swing	Seats	Change
Liberal	446,372	47.40	+ 1.49	8	▼1
National	9,611	1.02	+1.02	0	Steady
Liberal–National coalition	455,983	48.42	+2.52	8	▼1
Labor	346,071	36.75	+ 3.01	3	Steady
Greens	51,200	5.44	+1.80		
Democrats	17,682	1.88	–8.66		
One Nation	10,687	1.13	–3.62		
Family First	40,547	4.31	+4.31		
Independents	19,204	2.04	+1.16		
Total	997,102			11	▼1
Two-party-preferred vote
Liberal/National Coalition	511,845	54.36	+0.28	8	▼1
Labor	429,799	45.64	–0.28	3	Steady
Invalid/blank votes	55,458	5.56	+0.22		
Registered voters/turnout	1,051,923	94.79			
Source: AEC Tally Room

The redistribution saw South Australia lose one seat. This election saw four seats change hands; however, there was no net change in party representation. The Liberal vote rose slightly, as did Labor's (3.1% since 2001). While the Greens recorded a result of 5.4%.

== Results by division ==
=== Adelaide ===
2004 Australian federal election: Adelaide
Party	Candidate	Votes	%	±%
Liberal	Trish Worth	38,530	45.29	+0.82
Labor	Kate Ellis	35,666	41.92	+5.50
Greens	Jake Bugden	6,794	7.99	+2.02
Family First	Peter Robins	1,753	2.06	+2.06
Democrats	Richard Pascoe	1,355	1.59	−9.30
Independent	Amanda Barlow	978	1.15	+1.15
Total formal votes		85,076	95.60	+0.66
Informal votes		3,920	4.40	−0.66
Turnout		88,996	93.62	−1.09
Two-party-preferred result
Labor	Kate Ellis	43,671	51.33	+1.95
Liberal	Trish Worth	41,405	48.67	−1.95
Labor gain from Liberal		Swing	+1.95	

=== Barker ===
2004 Australian federal election: Barker
Party	Candidate	Votes	%	±%
Liberal	Patrick Secker	48,233	53.17	−2.95
Labor	Waluwe Simpson-Lyttle	19,478	21.47	−2.01
National	Tim Jackson	9,611	10.59	+10.59
Family First	Philip Cornish	5,276	5.82	+5.82
Greens	Pam Kelly	3,704	4.08	+0.98
Independent	Rodger Schmidt	1,572	1.73	+1.73
One Nation	Neil Russell-Taylor	1,501	1.65	−6.24
Democrats	Graham McNaughton	1,339	1.48	−4.66
Total formal votes		90,714	94.13	−0.34
Informal votes		5,662	5.87	+0.34
Turnout		96,376	95.48	−0.85
Two-party-preferred result
Liberal	Patrick Secker	63,392	69.88	+3.25
Labor	Waluwe Simpson-Lyttle	27,322	30.12	−3.25
Liberal hold		Swing	+3.25	

=== Boothby ===
2004 Australian federal election: Boothby
Party	Candidate	Votes	%	±%
Liberal	Andrew Southcott	43,640	50.62	+2.48
Labor	Chloë Fox	30,893	35.84	+9.92
Greens	Adrian Miller	6,131	7.11	+3.93
Family First	Paul Munn	2,571	2.98	+2.98
Democrats	Robert Simms	1,746	2.03	−16.89
Independent	Paul Starling	646	0.75	+0.21
One Nation	Clarke Staker	581	0.67	−1.95
Total formal votes		86,208	95.59	+0.13
Informal votes		3,976	4.41	−0.13
Turnout		90,184	94.59	−1.38
Two-party-preferred result
Liberal	Andrew Southcott	47,730	55.37	−2.00
Labor	Chloë Fox	38,478	44.63	+2.00
Liberal hold		Swing	−2.00	

=== Grey ===
2004 Australian federal election: Grey
Party	Candidate	Votes	%	±%
Liberal	Barry Wakelin	49,155	56.49	+2.01
Labor	John Hackett	26,375	30.31	−0.86
Family First	Roger Kleinig	4,397	5.05	+5.05
Greens	Felicity Martin	2,872	3.30	+0.87
Democrats	Gil Robertson	2,036	2.34	−2.46
One Nation	Peter Fitzpatrick	1,903	2.19	−4.93
Citizens Electoral Council	Paul Siebert	270	0.31	+0.31
Total formal votes		87,008	94.95	−0.28
Informal votes		4,631	5.05	+0.28
Turnout		91,639	94.19	−0.99
Two-party-preferred result
Liberal	Barry Wakelin	55,528	63.82	+3.17
Labor	John Hackett	31,480	36.18	−3.17
Liberal hold		Swing	+3.17	

=== Hindmarsh ===
2004 Australian federal election: Hindmarsh
Party	Candidate	Votes	%	±%
Liberal	Simon Birmingham	39,869	45.88	+0.81
Labor	Steve Georganas	36,786	42.33	+3.54
Greens	Tim White	4,437	5.11	+1.49
Family First	Trevor Grace	1,953	2.25	+2.25
Democrats	Nicole Prince	1,366	1.57	−7.46
Independent	Joe Ienco	1,130	1.30	+1.30
One Nation	Barbara Pannach	490	0.56	−2.85
Independent	Tony Musolino	478	0.55	+0.55
Independent	Bill Thomas	397	0.46	+0.46
Total formal votes		86,906	93.07	−1.23
Informal votes		6,470	6.93	+1.23
Turnout		93,376	94.71	−1.82
Two-party-preferred result
Labor	Steve Georganas	43,507	50.06	+1.02
Liberal	Simon Birmingham	43,399	49.94	−1.02
Labor gain from Liberal		Swing	+1.02	

=== Kingston ===
2004 Australian federal election: Kingston
Party	Candidate	Votes	%	±%
Liberal	Kym Richardson	36,848	43.59	+3.82
Labor	David Cox	35,748	42.29	+3.41
Family First	Andrew Cole	4,767	5.64	+5.64
Greens	Yvonne Darlington	4,478	5.30	+1.96
Democrats	Deirdre Albrighton	1,825	2.16	−9.70
One Nation	Laurel Payne	869	1.03	−3.59
Total formal votes		84,535	94.23	−0.26
Informal votes		5,178	5.77	+0.26
Turnout		89,713	95.31	−0.23
Two-party-preferred result
Liberal	Kym Richardson	42,327	50.07	+1.42
Labor	David Cox	42,208	49.93	−1.42
Liberal gain from Labor		Swing	+1.42	

=== Makin ===
2004 Australian federal election: Makin
Party	Candidate	Votes	%	±%
Liberal	Trish Draper	37,912	44.71	−1.01
Labor	Tony Zappia	36,486	43.02	+6.33
Family First	Rob Pillar	4,172	4.92	+4.92
Greens	Jon Moore	3,213	3.79	+1.47
Democrats	Catherine Opitz	1,484	1.75	−8.67
Independent	Jeanie Walker	820	0.97	+0.97
One Nation	Victor Horvat	715	0.84	−3.87
Total formal votes		84,802	94.59	−0.15
Informal votes		4,851	5.41	+0.15
Turnout		89,653	95.47	−0.67
Two-party-preferred result
Liberal	Trish Draper	43,186	50.93	−2.73
Labor	Tony Zappia	41,616	49.07	+2.73
Liberal hold		Swing	−2.73	

=== Mayo ===
2004 Australian federal election: Mayo
Party	Candidate	Votes	%	±%
Liberal	Alexander Downer	44,520	53.64	+0.01
Labor	James Murphy	13,689	16.49	−3.26
Independent	Brian Deegan	12,577	15.15	+15.15
Greens	Dennis Matthews	6,305	7.60	+2.13
Family First	Kevin Cramp	3,027	3.65	+3.65
Democrats	Kathy Brazher-de Laine	1,505	1.81	−11.90
One Nation	Robert Fechner	774	0.93	−3.27
Independent	Jon Grear	606	0.73	+0.73
Total formal votes		83,003	95.36	+0.30
Informal votes		4,039	4.64	−0.30
Turnout		87,042	95.21	+0.56
Notional two-party-preferred count
Liberal	Alexander Downer	52,780	63.59	−0.72
Labor	James Murphy	30,223	36.41	+0.72
Two-candidate-preferred result
Liberal	Alexander Downer	51,303	61.81	−2.49
Independent	Brian Deegan	31,700	38.19	+38.19
Liberal hold		Swing	N/A	

=== Port Adelaide ===
2004 Australian federal election: Port Adelaide
Party	Candidate	Votes	%	±%
Labor	Rod Sawford	46,692	54.51	+2.47
Liberal	Terry Inglis	27,338	31.92	+5.21
Greens	Anne McMenamin	4,641	5.42	+1.56
Family First	Richard Bunting	4,085	4.77	+4.77
Democrats	Trevor Tucker	1,710	2.00	−7.97
One Nation	Stan Batten	1,191	1.39	−4.17
Total formal votes		85,657	92.92	+0.33
Informal votes		6,522	7.08	−0.33
Turnout		82,179	94.34	−0.73
Two-party-preferred result
Labor	Rod Sawford	53,888	62.91	−3.09
Liberal	Terry Inglis	31,769	37.09	+3.09
Labor hold		Swing	−3.09	

=== Sturt ===
2004 Australian federal election: Sturt
Party	Candidate	Votes	%	±%
Liberal	Christopher Pyne	45,007	51.66	+0.98
Labor	Tony Barca	30,099	34.55	+5.21
Greens	Zane Young	5,279	6.06	+2.28
Family First	Sally McPherson	4,167	4.78	+4.78
Democrats	Kerrin Pine	1,970	2.26	−9.01
One Nation	Brian Richards	597	0.69	−2.41
Total formal votes		87,119	94.96	+0.77
Informal votes		4,624	5.04	−0.77
Turnout		91,743	94.79	−0.95
Two-party-preferred result
Liberal	Christopher Pyne	49,481	56.80	−1.69
Labor	Tony Barca	37,638	43.20	+1.69
Liberal hold		Swing	−1.69	

=== Wakefield ===
2004 Australian federal election: Wakefield
Party	Candidate	Votes	%	±%
Liberal	David Fawcett	35,320	43.81	+4.73
Labor	Martyn Evans	34,159	42.37	+3.40
Family First	David Pointon	4,379	5.43	+5.43
Greens	Patricia Murray	3,346	4.15	+1.00
One Nation	David Dwyer	2,066	2.56	−4.34
Democrats	Richard Way	1,346	1.67	−7.87
Total formal votes		80,616	93.52	−0.05
Informal votes		5,585	6.48	+0.05
Turnout		86,585	94.98	+0.08
Two-party-preferred result
Liberal	David Fawcett	40,848	50.67	+1.93
Labor	Martyn Evans	39,768	49.33	−1.93
Liberal notional gain from Labor		Swing	+1.93	

== See also ==
- Members of the Australian House of Representatives, 2004–2007
