= Results of the 1998 Australian federal election in South Australia =

1998 Australian federal election (South Australia)
← 1996	3 October 1998	2001 →

All 12 South Australian seats in the Australian House of Representatives and 6 seats in the Australian Senate
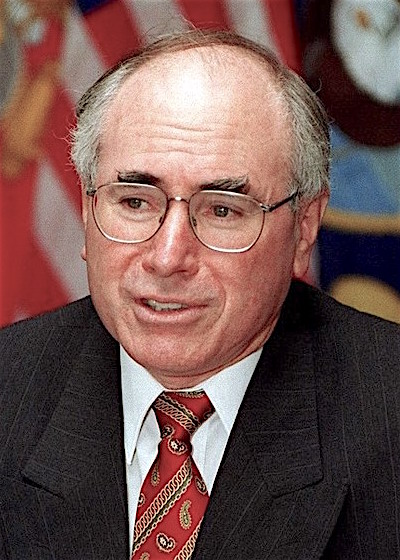

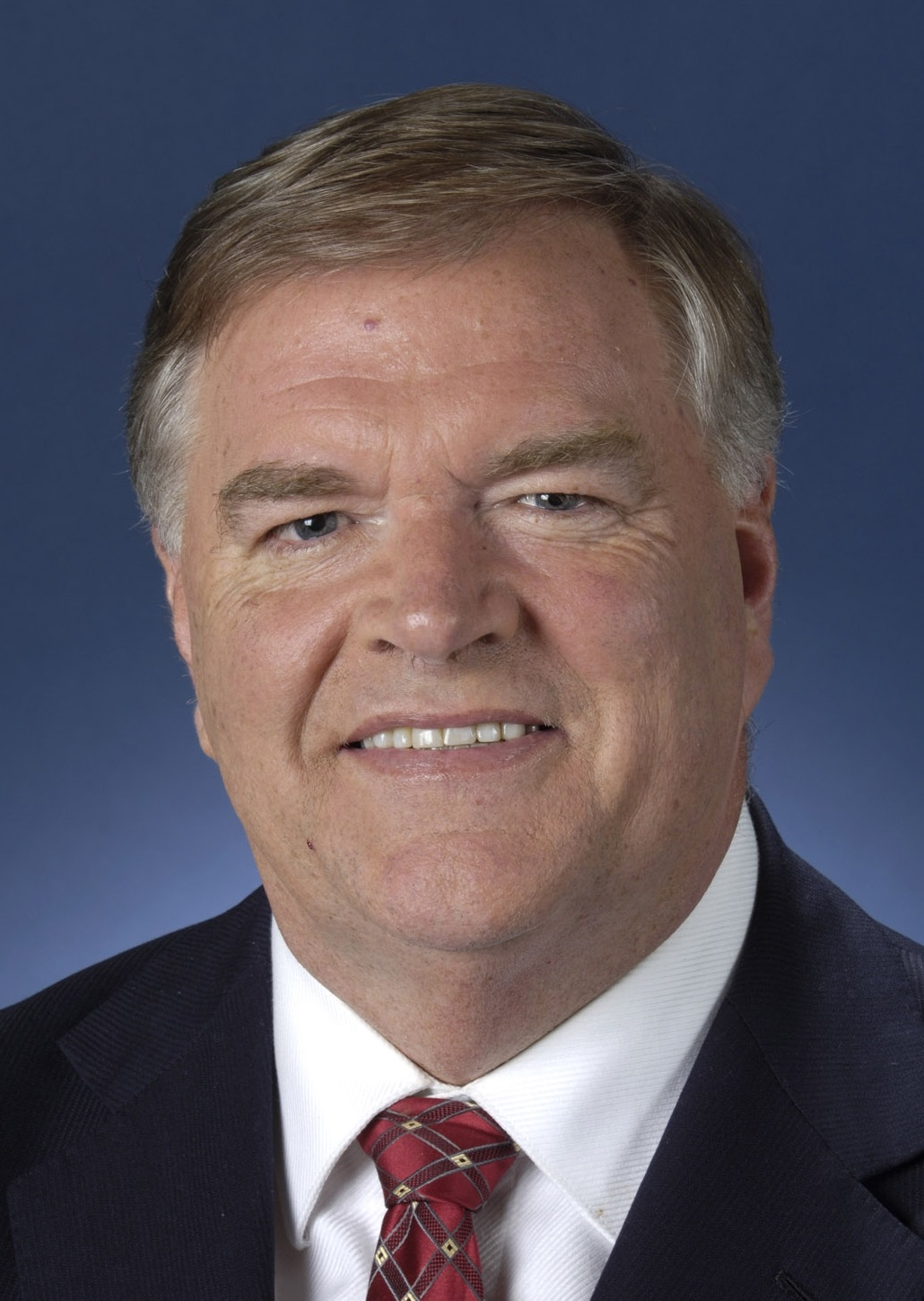
	First party	Second party
Leader	John Howard	Kim Beazley
Party	Liberal/National coalition	Labor
Last election	10 seats	2 seats
Seats won	9 seats	3 seats
Seat change	▼1	▲1
Popular vote	394,178	319,267
Percentage	42.6%	34.5%
Swing	▼7.4	▼0.4
TPP	53.11%	46.89%
TPP swing	▼4.15	▲4.15

This is a list of electoral division results for the Australian 1998 federal election in the state of South Australia.

== Overall results ==
Turnout 95.6% (CV) — Informal 3.5%
Party	Votes	%	Swing	Seats	Change
Liberal	389,382	42.05	-7.94	9	▼1
National	4,796	0.52	0.52		Steady
Liberal/National Coalition	394,178	42.57	-7.42	9	▼1
Labor	319,267	34.48	-0.35	3	▲1
Democrats	93,905	10.14	-0.06		
One Nation	90,773	9.80	0.00		
Independent	13,327	1.44	0.39		
Greens	4,576	0.49	-2.46		
Natural Law	3,526	0.38	-0.11		
Christian Democrats	3,521	0.38	0.00		
Australia First	1,604	0.17	0.00		
Communist	801	0.09	0.00		
Independent EFF	513	0.06	0.00		
Total	925,991			12	
Two-party-preferred vote
Liberal/National Coalition	491,802	53.11	-4.15	9	▼1
Labor	434,189	46.89	4.15	3	▲1
Invalid/blank votes	44,074	4.54	0.46		
Turnout	970,065	96.91			
Registered voters	1,001,006				
Source: Federal Elections 1998

== Results by division ==
=== Adelaide ===
1998 Australian federal election: Adelaide
Party	Candidate	Votes	%	±%
Liberal	Trish Worth	32,173	43.41	−4.48
Labor	Karen Hannon	27,756	37.45	−0.29
Democrats	Tyron Beard	7,077	9.55	+1.33
One Nation	Suzanne Ramsey	3,837	5.18	+5.18
Greens	Mark Moran	2,518	3.40	+0.64
Independent	Rita Hunt	462	0.62	+0.62
Natural Law	Vladimir Lorenzon	287	0.39	−0.05
Total formal votes		74,110	95.54	+0.23
Informal votes		3,458	4.46	−0.23
Turnout		77,568	94.41	−0.13
Two-party-preferred result
Liberal	Trish Worth	37,731	50.91	−2.58
Labor	Karen Hannon	36,379	49.09	+2.58
Liberal hold		Swing	−2.58	

=== Barker ===
1998 Australian federal election: Barker
Party	Candidate	Votes	%	±%
Liberal	Patrick Secker	36,412	46.89	−15.62
Labor	David Detchon	16,844	21.69	−1.36
One Nation	Dona Wright	10,096	13.00	+13.00
Democrats	John Lavers	4,919	6.33	−3.49
Independent	Tony Beck	3,985	5.13	+5.13
Christian Democrats	Philip Cornish	2,161	2.78	+2.78
National	Tom Haig	1,746	2.25	+2.25
Independent	Bill Jerram	784	1.01	+1.01
Australia First	Judith Ludwig	713	0.92	+0.92
Total formal votes		77,660	94.92	−1.66
Informal votes		4,158	5.08	+1.66
Turnout		81,818	96.52	+1.66
Two-party-preferred result
Liberal	Patrick Secker	49,501	63.74	−7.14
Labor	David Detchon	28,159	36.26	+7.14
Liberal hold		Swing	−7.14	

=== Bonython ===
1998 Australian federal election: Bonython
Party	Candidate	Votes	%	±%
Labor	Martyn Evans	35,961	50.52	+0.93
Liberal	Phil Newton	17,253	24.24	−6.75
One Nation	Ted Shaw	10,542	14.81	+14.81
Democrats	Robert Fisher	6,539	9.19	−5.27
Australia First	Dave Carter	891	1.25	+1.25
Total formal votes		71,186	94.47	−0.69
Informal votes		4,170	5.53	+0.69
Turnout		73,356	95.69	−0.56
Two-party-preferred result
Labor	Martyn Evans	45,935	64.53	+5.07
Liberal	Phil Newton	25,251	35.47	−5.07
Labor hold		Swing	+5.07	

=== Boothby ===
1998 Australian federal election: Boothby
Party	Candidate	Votes	%	±%
Liberal	Andrew Southcott	36,435	48.22	−5.13
Labor	Jo Chesson	23,547	31.16	+1.71
Democrats	Don Gilbert	9,821	13.00	−0.66
One Nation	Trevor Whittaker	5,213	6.90	+6.90
Natural Law	Bevan Morris	544	0.72	+0.03
Total formal votes		75,560	96.95	−0.32
Informal votes		2,380	3.05	+0.32
Turnout		77,940	95.80	+0.09
Two-party-preferred result
Liberal	Andrew Southcott	43,406	57.45	−4.16
Labor	Jo Chesson	32,154	42.55	+4.16
Liberal hold		Swing	−4.16	

=== Grey ===
1998 Australian federal election: Grey
Party	Candidate	Votes	%	±%
Liberal	Barry Wakelin	35,669	47.45	−6.84
Labor	Geoff Buckland	23,581	31.37	−5.06
One Nation	Noel Dickson	9,469	12.60	+12.60
Democrats	Nick Weetman	3,802	5.06	−1.85
National	Ian Gray	1,592	2.12	+2.12
Independent	Martin Jackson	729	0.97	+0.97
Natural Law	Paul Brown	325	0.43	+0.43
Total formal votes		75,167	95.79	−0.75
Informal votes		3,306	4.21	+0.75
Turnout		78,473	94.64	−0.39
Two-party-preferred result
Liberal	Barry Wakelin	43,627	58.04	−0.50
Labor	Geoff Buckland	31,540	41.96	+0.50
Liberal hold		Swing	−0.50	

=== Hindmarsh ===
1998 Australian federal election: Hindmarsh
Party	Candidate	Votes	%	±%
Liberal	Chris Gallus	33,031	43.28	−8.68
Labor	Steve Georganas	29,912	39.19	+3.44
Democrats	Neil Raw	5,659	7.41	+0.31
One Nation	Colin Gibson	5,362	7.03	+7.03
Greens	Deb Cashel	2,058	2.70	+0.23
Natural Law	Sandra Dunning	302	0.40	−0.05
Total formal votes		76,324	95.43	−0.48
Informal votes		3,656	4.57	+0.48
Turnout		79,980	95.64	−0.14
Two-party-preferred result
Liberal	Chris Gallus	39,100	51.23	−6.83
Labor	Steve Georganas	37,224	48.77	+6.83
Liberal hold		Swing	−6.83	

=== Kingston ===
1998 Australian federal election: Kingston
Party	Candidate	Votes	%	±%
Liberal	Susan Jeanes	32,211	39.45	−3.44
Labor	David Cox	31,441	38.51	−1.04
Democrats	Graham Pratt	7,725	9.46	−0.49
One Nation	Charlie McCormack	7,510	9.20	+9.20
Independent	Olive Weston	980	1.20	+1.20
Independent	Ralph Hahnheuser	869	1.06	+1.06
Independent EFF	Chris Planeta	513	0.63	+0.63
Natural Law	Hugh Dickson	400	0.49	+0.08
Total formal votes		81,649	95.34	−0.17
Informal votes		3,989	4.66	+0.17
Turnout		85,638	96.22	−0.41
Two-party-preferred result
Labor	David Cox	41,206	50.47	+2.48
Liberal	Susan Jeanes	40,443	49.53	−2.48
Labor gain from Liberal		Swing	+2.48	

=== Makin ===
1998 Australian federal election: Makin
Party	Candidate	Votes	%	±%
Liberal	Trish Draper	33,702	40.70	−3.85
Labor	Gail Gago	31,194	37.67	−3.07
Democrats	Christine Posta	8,502	10.27	+1.04
One Nation	Rod Kowald	8,009	9.67	+9.67
Independent	Mike Wohltmann	1,002	1.21	+1.21
Natural Law	Geoffrey Wells	391	0.47	−0.44
Total formal votes		82,800	95.70	+0.70
Informal votes		3,719	4.30	−0.70
Turnout		86,519	96.31	−0.18
Two-party-preferred result
Liberal	Trish Draper	42,180	50.94	−0.14
Labor	Gail Gago	40,620	49.06	+0.14
Liberal hold		Swing	−0.14	

=== Mayo ===
1998 Australian federal election: Mayo
Party	Candidate	Votes	%	±%
Liberal	Alexander Downer	38,246	45.64	−11.37
Democrats	John Schumann	18,791	22.43	+9.99
Labor	Jade Evans	18,290	21.83	−3.34
One Nation	Lee Peacock	6,146	7.33	+7.33
Christian Democrats	Ian Wynn	1,360	1.62	+1.62
Independent	Howie Coombe	598	0.71	+0.71
Natural Law	Anthony Coombe	360	0.43	−0.16
Total formal votes		83,791	96.15	−0.73
Informal votes		3,353	3.85	+0.73
Turnout		87,144	95.91	−0.27
Notional two-party-preferred count
Liberal	Alexander Downer	50,189	59.90	−5.26
Labor	Jade Evans	33,602	40.10	+5.26
Two-candidate-preferred result
Liberal	Alexander Downer	43,354	51.74	−13.42
Democrats	John Schumann	40,437	48.26	+48.26
Liberal hold		Swing	N/A	

=== Port Adelaide ===
1998 Australian federal election: Port Adelaide
Party	Candidate	Votes	%	±%
Labor	Rod Sawford	39,449	53.10	+4.68
Liberal	Romeo Cavuoto	19,083	25.69	−11.12
One Nation	John Powell	6,731	9.06	+9.06
Democrats	Matilda Bawden	6,696	9.01	−0.55
Independent	Rick Hill	1,527	2.06	+2.06
Communist	Michael Perth	801	1.08	+1.08
Total formal votes		74,287	94.46	+0.02
Informal votes		4,358	5.54	−0.02
Turnout		78,645	95.62	−0.01
Two-party-preferred result
Labor	Rod Sawford	49,107	66.10	+9.06
Liberal	Romeo Cavuoto	25,180	33.90	−9.06
Labor hold		Swing	+9.06	

=== Sturt ===
1998 Australian federal election: Sturt
Party	Candidate	Votes	%	±%
Liberal	Christopher Pyne	34,703	47.77	−6.30
Labor	Lance Worrall	23,766	32.71	+0.80
Democrats	Jackie Dearing	8,174	11.25	+0.93
One Nation	Paul Sissons	4,385	6.04	+6.04
Natural Law	Lyndal Vincent	917	1.26	+0.47
Independent	Michal Kinasz	701	0.96	+0.96
Total formal votes		72,646	95.60	−0.56
Informal votes		3,347	4.40	+0.56
Turnout		75,993	95.20	+0.00
Two-party-preferred result
Liberal	Christopher Pyne	41,621	57.29	−2.70
Labor	Lance Worrall	31,025	42.71	+2.70
Liberal hold		Swing	−2.70	

=== Wakefield ===
1998 Australian federal election: Wakefield
Party	Candidate	Votes	%	±%
Liberal	Neil Andrew	40,464	50.07	−10.80
Labor	Carla Leversedge	17,526	21.69	−1.11
One Nation	Merv Hartwig	13,473	16.67	+16.67
Democrats	Karrie Lannstrom	6,200	7.67	−3.22
Independent	Pam Kelly	1,690	2.09	+2.09
National	Jeremy Challacombe	1,458	1.80	+1.80
Total formal votes		80,811	95.08	−1.12
Informal votes		4,180	4.92	+1.12
Turnout		84,991	95.87	−0.75
Two-party-preferred result
Liberal	Neil Andrew	53,573	66.29	−3.67
Labor	Carla Leversedge	27,238	33.71	+3.67
Liberal hold		Swing	−3.67	

== See also ==
- Results of the 1998 Australian federal election (House of Representatives)
- Members of the Australian House of Representatives, 1998–2001
