= Members of the Australian House of Representatives, 2004–2007 =

41st Parliament of Australia

This is a list of members of the Australian House of Representatives from 2004 to 2007, as elected at the 2004 federal election, together known as the 41st Parliament. It had a total of 150 members, comprising 74 Liberal, 1 Country Liberal and 12 National members, together forming a Coalition majority government with 87 members. Labor had 60 members and there were 3 independents.

Member	Party	Electorate	State	In office
Tony Abbott	Liberal	Warringah	NSW	1994–2019
Dick Adams	Labor	Lyons	Tas	1993–2013
Anthony Albanese	Labor	Grayndler	NSW	1996–present
John Anderson	National	Gwydir	NSW	1989–2007
Peter Andren	Independent	Calare	NSW	1996–2007
Kevin Andrews	Liberal	Menzies	Vic	1991–2022
Fran Bailey	Liberal	McEwen	Vic	1990–1993, 1996–2010
Bruce Baird	Liberal	Cook	NSW	2001–2007
Mark Baker	Liberal	Braddon	Tas	2004–2007
Bob Baldwin	Liberal	Paterson	NSW	1996–1998, 2001–2016
Phil Barresi	Liberal	Deakin	Vic	1996–2007
Kerry Bartlett	Liberal	Macquarie	NSW	1996–2007
Kim Beazley	Labor	Brand	WA	1980–2007
Arch Bevis	Labor	Brisbane	Qld	1990–2010
Bruce Billson	Liberal	Dunkley	Vic	1996–2016
Sharon Bird	Labor	Cunningham	NSW	2004–2022
Bronwyn Bishop	Liberal	Mackellar	NSW	1994–2016
Julie Bishop	Liberal	Curtin	WA	1998–2019
Chris Bowen	Labor	Prospect	NSW	2004–present
Russell Broadbent	Liberal	McMillan	Vic	1990–1993, 1996–1998; 2004–2025
Mal Brough	Liberal	Longman	Qld	1996–2007, 2013–2016
Anna Burke	Labor	Chisholm	Vic	1998–2016
Tony Burke	Labor	Watson	NSW	2004–present
Anthony Byrne	Labor	Holt	Vic	1999–2022
Alan Cadman	Liberal	Mitchell	NSW	1974–2007
Ian Causley	National	Page	NSW	1996–2007
Steven Ciobo	Liberal	Moncrieff	Qld	2001–2019
John Cobb	National	Parkes	NSW	2001–2016
Ann Corcoran	Labor	Isaacs	Vic	2000–2007
Peter Costello	Liberal	Higgins	Vic	1990–2009
Simon Crean	Labor	Hotham	Vic	1990–2013
Michael Danby	Labor	Melbourne Ports	Vic	1998–2019
Alexander Downer	Liberal	Mayo	SA	1984–2008
Trish Draper	Liberal	Makin	SA	1996–2007
Peter Dutton	Liberal	Dickson	Qld	2001–2025
Graham Edwards	Labor	Cowan	WA	1998–2007
Justine Elliot	Labor	Richmond	NSW	2004–present
Annette Ellis	Labor	Canberra	ACT	1996–2010
Kate Ellis	Labor	Adelaide	SA	2004–2019
Kay Elson	Liberal	Forde	Qld	1996–2007
Craig Emerson	Labor	Rankin	Qld	1998–2013
Warren Entsch	Liberal	Leichhardt	Qld	1996–2007, 2010–2025
Pat Farmer	Liberal	Macarthur	NSW	2001–2010
David Fawcett	Liberal	Wakefield	SA	2004–2007
Laurie Ferguson	Labor	Reid	NSW	1990–2016
Martin Ferguson	Labor	Batman	Vic	1996–2013
Michael Ferguson	Liberal	Bass	Tas	2004–2007
Joel Fitzgibbon	Labor	Hunter	NSW	1996–2022
John Forrest	National	Mallee	Vic	1993–2013
Teresa Gambaro	Liberal	Petrie	Qld	1996–2007, 2010–2016
Peter Garrett	Labor	Kingsford Smith	NSW	2004–2013
Joanna Gash	Liberal	Gilmore	NSW	1996–2013
Jennie George	Labor	Throsby	NSW	2001–2010
Steve Georganas	Labor	Hindmarsh	SA	2004–2013, 2016–present
Petro Georgiou	Liberal	Kooyong	Vic	1994–2010
Steve Gibbons	Labor	Bendigo	Vic	1998–2013
Julia Gillard	Labor	Lalor	Vic	1998–2013
Sharon Grierson	Labor	Newcastle	NSW	2001–2013
Alan Griffin	Labor	Bruce	Vic	1993–2016
Barry Haase	Liberal	Kalgoorlie	WA	1998–2013
Jill Hall	Labor	Shortland	NSW	1998–2016
Gary Hardgrave	Liberal	Moreton	Qld	1996–2007
Luke Hartsuyker	National	Cowper	NSW	2001–2019
Michael Hatton	Labor	Blaxland	NSW	1996–2007
David Hawker	Liberal	Wannon	Vic	1983–2010
Chris Hayes^{[1]}	Labor	Werriwa	NSW	2005–2022
Stuart Henry	Liberal	Hasluck	WA	2004–2007
Kelly Hoare	Labor	Charlton	NSW	1998–2007
Joe Hockey	Liberal	North Sydney	NSW	1996–2015
John Howard	Liberal	Bennelong	NSW	1974–2007
Kay Hull	National	Riverina	NSW	1998–2010
Greg Hunt	Liberal	Flinders	Vic	2001–2022
Julia Irwin	Labor	Fowler	NSW	1998–2010
Harry Jenkins	Labor	Scullin	Vic	1986–2013
Dennis Jensen	Liberal	Tangney	WA	2004–2016
Michael Johnson	Liberal	Ryan	Qld	2001–2010
David Jull	Liberal	Fadden	Qld	1975–1983, 1984–2007
Bob Katter	Independent	Kennedy	Qld	1993–present
Michael Keenan	Liberal	Stirling	WA	2004–2019
De-Anne Kelly	National	Dawson	Qld	1996–2007
Jackie Kelly	Liberal	Lindsay	NSW	1996–2007
Duncan Kerr	Labor	Denison	Tas	1987–2010
Catherine King	Labor	Ballarat	Vic	2001–present
Andrew Laming	Liberal	Bowman	Qld	2004–2022
Carmen Lawrence	Labor	Fremantle	WA	1994–2007
Mark Latham^{[1]}	Labor	Werriwa	NSW	1994–2005
Sussan Ley	Liberal	Farrer	NSW	2001–2026
Peter Lindsay	Liberal	Herbert	Qld	1996–2010
Kirsten Livermore	Labor	Capricornia	Qld	1998–2013
Jim Lloyd	Liberal	Robertson	NSW	1996–2007
Stewart McArthur	Liberal	Corangamite	Vic	1984–2007
Robert McClelland	Labor	Barton	NSW	1996–2013
Ian Macfarlane	Liberal	Groom	Qld	1998–2016
Peter McGauran	National	Gippsland	Vic	1983–2008
Bob McMullan	Labor	Fraser	ACT	1996–2010
Jenny Macklin	Labor	Jagajaga	Vic	1996–2019
Louise Markus	Liberal	Greenway	NSW	2004–2016
Margaret May	Liberal	McPherson	Qld	1998–2010
Daryl Melham	Labor	Banks	NSW	1990–2013
Sophie Mirabella	Liberal	Indi	Vic	2001–2013
Judi Moylan	Liberal	Pearce	WA	1993–2013
John Murphy	Labor	Lowe	NSW	1998–2013
Gary Nairn	Liberal	Eden-Monaro	NSW	1996–2007
Brendan Nelson	Liberal	Bradfield	NSW	1996–2009
Paul Neville	National	Hinkler	Qld	1993–2013
Brendan O'Connor	Labor	Gorton	Vic	2001–2025
Gavan O'Connor	Labor	Corio	Vic	1993–2007
Julie Owens	Labor	Parramatta	NSW	2004–2022
Chris Pearce	Liberal	Aston	Vic	2001–2010
Tanya Plibersek	Labor	Sydney	NSW	1998–present
Roger Price	Labor	Chifley	NSW	1984–2010
Geoff Prosser	Liberal	Forrest	WA	1987–2007
Christopher Pyne	Liberal	Sturt	SA	1993–2019
Harry Quick	Labor/Independent^{[2]}	Franklin	Tas	1993–2007
Don Randall	Liberal	Canning	WA	1996–1998, 2001–2015
Kym Richardson	Liberal	Kingston	SA	2004–2007
Bernie Ripoll	Labor	Oxley	Qld	1998–2016
Andrew Robb	Liberal	Goldstein	Vic	2004–2016
Nicola Roxon	Labor	Gellibrand	Vic	1998–2013
Kevin Rudd	Labor	Griffith	Qld	1998–2013
Philip Ruddock	Liberal	Berowra	NSW	1973–2016
Rod Sawford	Labor	Port Adelaide	SA	1988–2007
Alby Schultz	Liberal	Hume	NSW	1998–2013
Bruce Scott	National	Maranoa	Qld	1990–2016
Patrick Secker	Liberal	Barker	SA	1998–2013
Bob Sercombe	Labor	Maribyrnong	Vic	1996–2007
Peter Slipper	Liberal	Fisher	Qld	1984–87, 1993–2013
Stephen Smith	Labor	Perth	WA	1993–2013
Tony Smith	Liberal	Casey	Vic	2001–2022
Warren Snowdon	Labor	Lingiari	NT	1987–1996, 1998–2022
Alex Somlyay	Liberal	Fairfax	Qld	1990–2013
Andrew Southcott	Liberal	Boothby	SA	1996–2016
Sharman Stone	Liberal	Murray	Vic	1996–2016
Wayne Swan	Labor	Lilley	Qld	1993–1996, 1998–2019
Lindsay Tanner	Labor	Melbourne	Vic	1993–2010
Cameron Thompson	Liberal	Blair	Qld	1998–2007
Kelvin Thomson	Labor	Wills	Vic	1996–2016
Ken Ticehurst	Liberal	Dobell	NSW	2001–2007
Dave Tollner	Country Liberal	Solomon	NT	2001–2007
Malcolm Turnbull	Liberal	Wentworth	NSW	2004–2018
Warren Truss	National	Wide Bay	Qld	1990–2016
Wilson Tuckey	Liberal	O'Connor	WA	1980–2010
Mark Vaile	National	Lyne	NSW	1993–2008
Danna Vale	Liberal	Hughes	NSW	1996–2010
Maria Vamvakinou	Labor	Calwell	Vic	2001–2025
Ross Vasta	Liberal	Bonner	Qld	2004–2007, 2010–2025
Barry Wakelin	Liberal	Grey	SA	1993–2007
Mal Washer	Liberal	Moore	WA	1998–2013
Kim Wilkie	Labor	Swan	WA	1998–2007
Tony Windsor	Independent	New England	NSW	2001–2013
Jason Wood	Liberal	La Trobe	Vic	2004–2010, 2013–present

^{1} The Labor member for Werriwa, former opposition leader Mark Latham, resigned on 18 January 2005 citing health concerns. The Labor candidate Chris Hayes won the resulting by-election on 19 March.
^{2} Franklin MP Harry Quick was expelled from the Labor Party on 20 August 2007 for failing to pay dues to the party. He served out the remainder of his term as an independent.
