= Results of the 2001 Australian federal election in South Australia =

2001 Australian federal election (South Australia)
← 1998	10 November 2001	2004 →

All 12 South Australian seats in the Australian House of Representatives and 6 seats in the Australian Senate
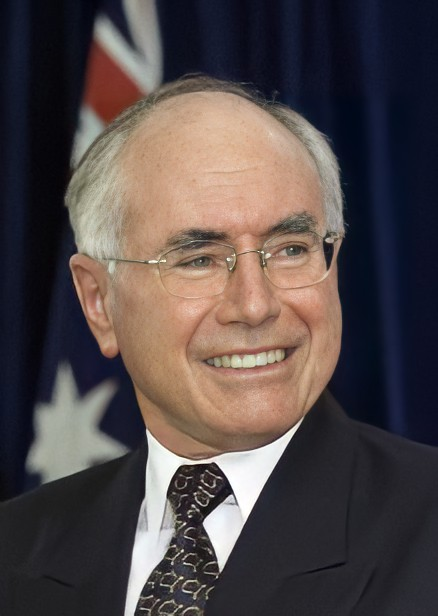

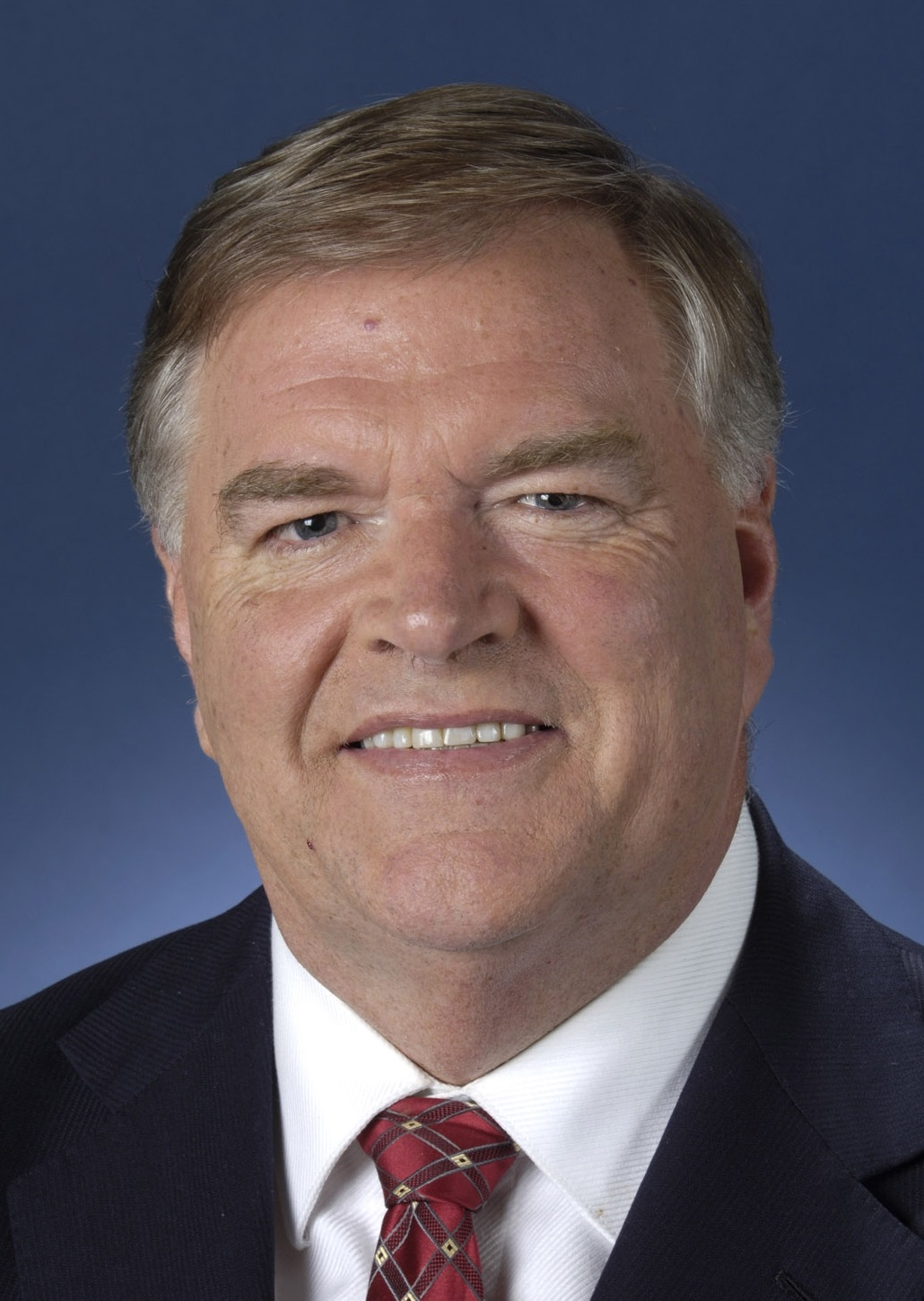
	First party	Second party
Leader	John Howard	Kim Beazley
Party	Liberal/National coalition	Labor
Last election	9 seats	3 seats
Seats won	9 seats	3 seats
Seat change	Steady	Steady
Popular vote	430,442	316,362
Percentage	45.90%	33.75%
Swing	▲3.85	▼0.74
TPP	54.08%	45.92%
TPP swing	▲0.97	▼0.97

This is a list of electoral division results for the Australian 2001 federal election in the state of South Australia.

== Overall results ==
Turnout 99.60% (CV) — Informal 3.40%
Party	Votes	%	Swing	Seats	Change
Liberal	430,442	45.90	3.85	9	Steady
Labor	316,362	33.74	-0.74	3	Steady
Democrats	98,849	10.54	0.40		
One Nation	44,574	4.75	-5.05		
Greens	34,141	3.64	3.15		
Independents	7,921	0.80			
No GST	4,202	0.42	+0.42		
Communist	0,672	0.07			
Total	937,708			12	
Two-party-preferred vote
Liberal		45.92	-0.97	9	Steady
Labor		54.08	0.97	3	Steady

== Results by division ==
=== Adelaide ===
2001 Australian federal election: Adelaide
Party	Candidate	Votes	%	±%
Liberal	Trish Worth	34,258	44.20	+0.80
Labor	Tim Stanley	28,732	37.07	−0.08
Democrats	Sue Mann	8,255	10.65	+0.93
Greens	Lynne Osborn	4,638	5.98	+2.82
One Nation	Lee Peacock	1,630	2.10	−3.34
Total formal votes		77,513	94.91	−0.70
Informal votes		4,156	5.09	+0.70
Turnout		81,669	94.81	
Two-party-preferred result
Liberal	Trish Worth	38,928	50.22	−0.43
Labor	Tim Stanley	38,585	49.78	+0.43
Liberal hold		Swing	−0.43	

=== Barker ===
2001 Australian federal election: Barker
Party	Candidate	Votes	%	±%
Liberal	Patrick Secker	43,201	54.06	+7.20
Labor	David Detchon	18,968	23.74	+2.04
One Nation	Dona Wright	5,900	7.38	−5.62
Democrats	Louise Miller	5,504	6.89	+0.55
Greens	Matt Rigney	2,629	3.29	+3.29
Independent	Liz Ballinger	2,538	3.18	+3.18
Independent	Philip Cornish	1,167	1.46	+1.46
Total formal votes		79,907	94.50	−0.43
Informal votes		4,654	5.50	+0.43
Turnout		84,561	96.96	
Two-party-preferred result
Liberal	Patrick Secker	52,491	65.69	+1.65
Labor	David Detchon	27,416	34.31	−1.65
Liberal hold		Swing	+1.65	

=== Bonython ===
2001 Australian federal election: Bonython
Party	Candidate	Votes	%	±%
Labor	Martyn Evans	35,813	47.36	−2.42
Liberal	Brenton Chomel	21,822	28.86	+3.81
Democrats	Mark Dennis	7,984	10.56	+1.26
One Nation	John Mahoney	4,825	6.38	−8.23
No GST	Rita Hunt	3,066	4.05	+4.05
Greens	Lisa Blake	2,102	2.78	+2.78
Total formal votes		75,612	92.67	−1.87
Informal votes		5,984	7.33	+1.87
Turnout		81,596	96.00	
Two-party-preferred result
Labor	Martyn Evans	45,688	60.42	−2.89
Liberal	Brenton Chomel	29,924	39.58	+2.89
Labor hold		Swing	−2.89	

=== Boothby ===
2001 Australian federal election: Boothby
Party	Candidate	Votes	%	±%
Liberal	Andrew Southcott	39,258	47.93	−0.53
Labor	Jim Murphy	20,976	25.61	−4.82
Democrats	Jo Pride	15,951	19.47	+5.92
Greens	Michelle Drummond	2,516	3.07	+3.07
One Nation	Daniel Piechnick	2,151	2.63	−4.13
Independent	Paul Starling	468	0.57	+0.57
Independent	Jack King	441	0.54	+0.54
	William Manfield	154	0.19	+0.19
Total formal votes		81,915	95.50	−1.47
Informal votes		3,864	4.50	+1.47
Turnout		85,779	95.99	
Two-party-preferred result
Liberal	Andrew Southcott	46,982	57.35	−0.26
Labor	Jim Murphy	34,933	42.65	+0.26
Liberal hold		Swing	−0.26	

=== Grey ===
2001 Australian federal election: Grey
Party	Candidate	Votes	%	±%
Liberal	Barry Wakelin	42,270	54.61	+6.91
Labor	Con O'Neill	24,345	31.45	+0.83
One Nation	Sylvia Holland	5,276	6.82	−6.19
Democrats	Gil Robertson	3,672	4.74	−0.41
Greens	Felicity Martin	1,845	2.38	+2.38
Total formal votes		77,408	95.43	−0.31
Informal votes		3,708	4.57	+0.31
Turnout		81,116	94.95	
Two-party-preferred result
Liberal	Barry Wakelin	46,876	60.56	+1.53
Labor	Con O'Neill	30,532	39.44	−1.53
Liberal hold		Swing	+1.53	

=== Hindmarsh ===
2001 Australian federal election: Hindmarsh
Party	Candidate	Votes	%	±%
Liberal	Chris Gallus	35,117	46.04	+2.76
Labor	Steve Georganas	29,187	38.26	−0.93
Democrats	Caroline Dowd	6,764	8.87	+1.45
Greens	Deb Cashel	2,757	3.61	+0.92
One Nation	Peter Fitzpatrick	2,458	3.22	−3.80
Total formal votes		76,283	94.22	−1.21
Informal votes		4,677	5.78	+1.21
Turnout		80,960	95.79	
Two-party-preferred result
Liberal	Chris Gallus	39,564	51.86	+0.63
Labor	Steve Georganas	36,719	48.14	−0.63
Liberal hold		Swing	+0.63	

=== Kingston ===
2001 Australian federal election: Kingston
Party	Candidate	Votes	%	±%
Labor	David Cox	31,127	40.17	+0.66
Liberal	Dean Hersey	30,080	38.82	+0.56
Democrats	Graham Pratt	9,076	11.71	+2.22
One Nation	Charlie McCormack	3,634	4.69	−4.59
Greens	Deborah Guildner	2,437	3.14	+3.14
No GST	Gordon Arandelovic	1,136	1.47	+1.47
Total formal votes		77,490	94.50	−0.81
Informal votes		4,511	5.50	+0.81
Turnout		82,001	96.59	
Two-party-preferred result
Labor	David Cox	40,618	52.42	+0.54
Liberal	Dean Hersey	36,872	47.58	−0.54
Labor hold		Swing	+0.54	

=== Makin ===
2001 Australian federal election: Makin
Party	Candidate	Votes	%	±%
Liberal	Trish Draper	36,979	45.94	+5.35
Labor	Julie Woodman	29,539	36.70	−1.14
Democrats	Christine Posta	8,343	10.37	+0.14
One Nation	Rod Kowald	3,779	4.69	−4.95
Greens	Allon Reeves	1,850	2.30	+2.30
Total formal votes		80,490	94.79	−0.92
Informal votes		4,420	5.21	+0.92
Turnout		84,910	96.68	
Two-party-preferred result
Liberal	Trish Draper	43,271	53.76	+2.98
Labor	Julie Woodman	37,219	46.24	−2.98
Liberal hold		Swing	+2.98	

=== Mayo ===
2001 Australian federal election: Mayo
Party	Candidate	Votes	%	±%
Liberal	Alexander Downer	41,259	52.76	+6.45
Labor	Delia Brennan	16,269	20.80	−0.73
Democrats	John McLaren	11,607	14.84	−6.98
Greens	Dave Clark	4,084	5.22	+5.22
One Nation	Mike Thomas	2,366	3.03	−4.52
Independent	Bill Spragg	2,307	2.95	+2.95
Independent	Howie Coombe	310	0.40	−0.25
Total formal votes		78,202	94.51	−1.59
Informal votes		4,544	5.49	+1.59
Turnout		82,746	96.19	
Two-party-preferred result
Liberal	Alexander Downer	49,162	62.87	+2.97
Labor	Delia Brennan	29,040	37.13	−2.97
Liberal hold		Swing	N/A	

=== Port Adelaide ===
2001 Australian federal election: Port Adelaide
Party	Candidate	Votes	%	±%
Labor	Rod Sawford	38,783	50.77	−2.33
Liberal	Josh Krieg	22,474	29.42	+3.61
Democrats	Matilda Bawden	7,313	9.57	+0.62
One Nation	Andrew Phillips	3,932	5.15	−3.83
Greens	Brian Noone	3,210	4.20	+4.08
Communist	Michael Perth	672	0.88	−0.16
Total formal votes		76,384	93.14	−1.25
Informal votes		5,627	6.86	+1.25
Turnout		82,011	95.48	
Two-party-preferred result
Labor	Rod Sawford	49,379	64.65	−1.07
Liberal	Josh Krieg	27,005	35.35	+1.07
Labor hold		Swing	−1.07	

=== Sturt ===
2001 Australian federal election: Sturt
Party	Candidate	Votes	%	±%
Liberal	Christopher Pyne	39,508	50.73	+2.84
Labor	Lindsay Simmons	23,143	29.72	−2.03
Democrats	Tim Farrow	8,438	10.83	−1.25
Greens	Mark Cullen	3,257	4.18	+4.18
One Nation	Brian Richards	2,451	3.15	−2.87
Independent	Neil Aitchison	1,081	1.39	+1.39
Total formal votes		77,878	94.74	−0.86
Informal votes		4,322	5.26	+0.86
Turnout		82,200	95.53	
Two-party-preferred result
Liberal	Christopher Pyne	45,310	58.18	+0.46
Labor	Lindsay Simmons	32,568	41.82	−0.46
Liberal hold		Swing	+0.46	

=== Wakefield ===
2001 Australian federal election: Wakefield
Party	Candidate	Votes	%	±%
Liberal	Neil Andrew	44,216	56.24	+6.27
Labor	Tim Rowbottom	19,480	24.78	+2.81
One Nation	David Dwyer	6,172	7.85	−8.59
Democrats	Marcus Reseigh	5,942	7.56	−0.14
Greens	Pam Kelly	2,816	3.58	+3.58
Total formal votes		78,626	94.52	−0.57
Informal votes		4,558	5.48	+0.57
Turnout		83,184	96.69	
Two-party-preferred result
Liberal	Neil Andrew	50,764	64.57	−2.07
Labor	Tim Rowbottom	27,861	35.43	+2.07
Liberal hold		Swing	−2.07	

== See also ==
- Results of the 2001 Australian federal election (House of Representatives)
- Members of the Australian House of Representatives, 2001–2004
