= Results of the 2007 Australian federal election in South Australia =

2007 Australian federal election (South Australia)
← 2004	24 November 2007	2010 →

All 11 South Australian seats in the Australian House of Representatives and 6 seats in the Australian Senate
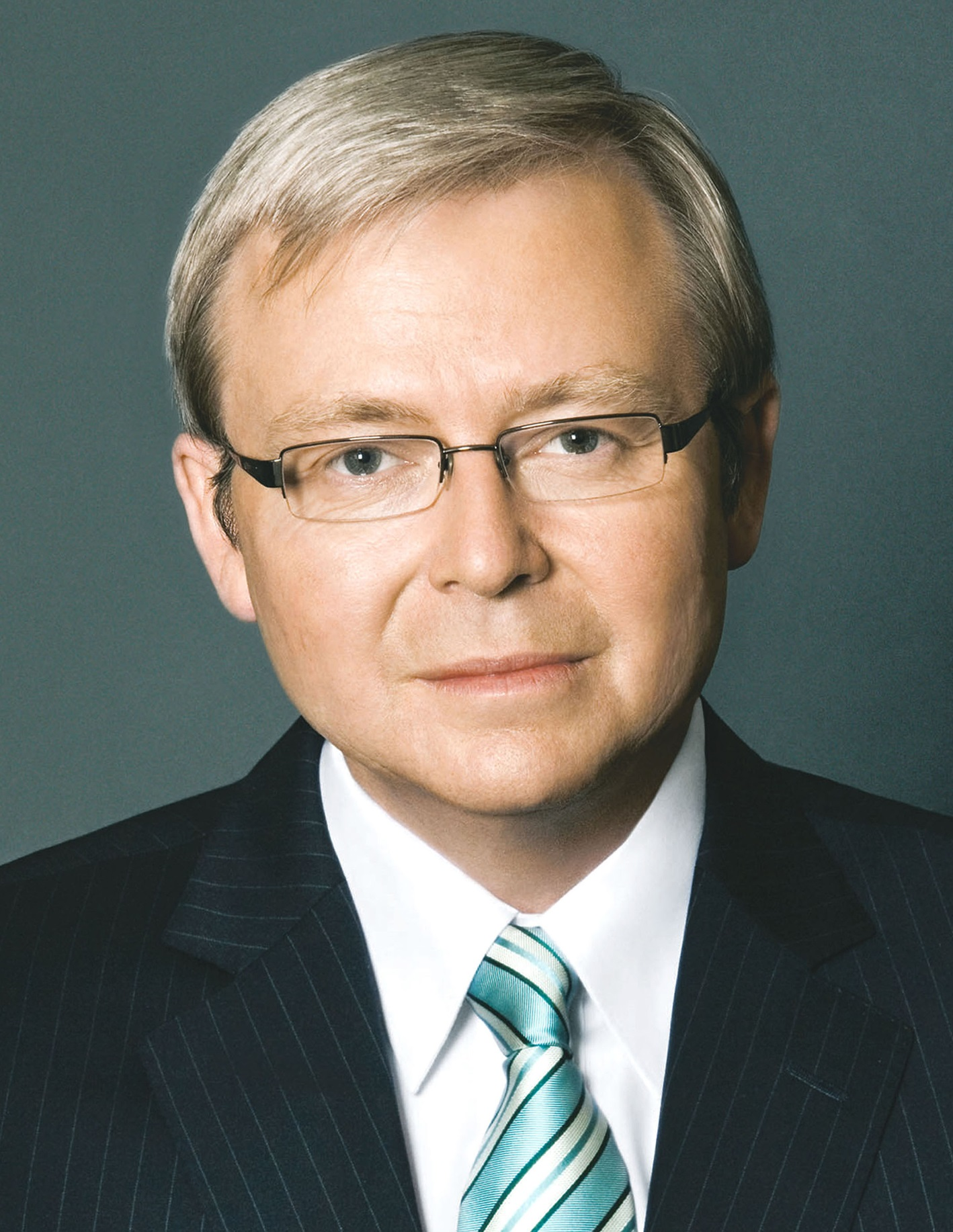

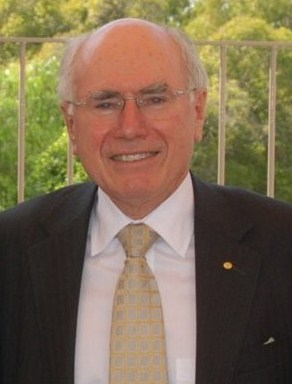
	First party	Second party
Leader	Kevin Rudd	John Howard
Party	Labor	Liberal/National coalition
Last election	3 seats	8 seats
Seats won	6 seats	5 seats
Seat change	▲3	▼3
Popular vote	426,639	425,041
Percentage	43.18%	43.02%
Swing	▲6.43	▼5.40
TPP	52.40%	47.60%
TPP swing	▲6.76	▼6.76
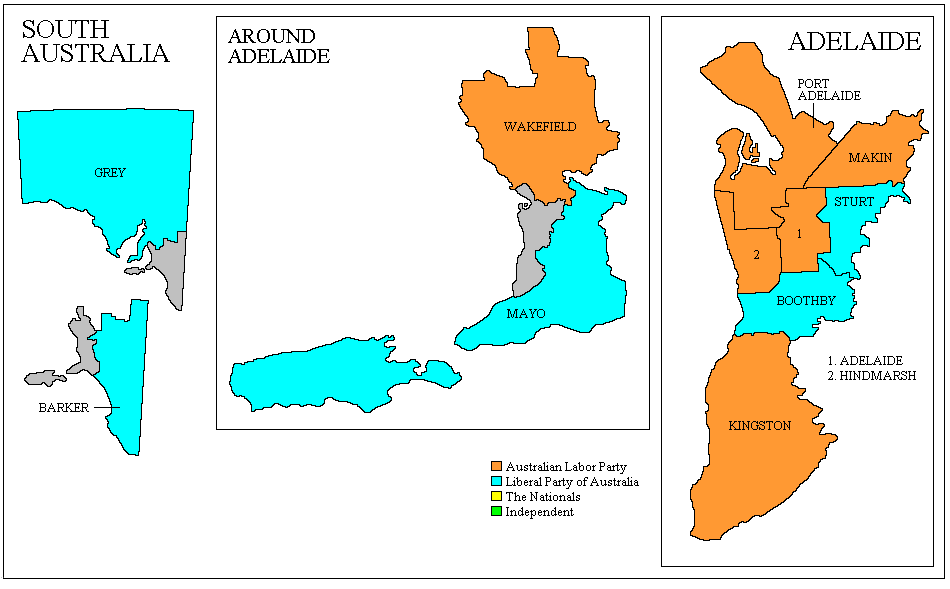
- Electoral divisions: South Australia

This is a list of electoral division results for the Australian 2007 federal election in the state of South Australia.

== Overall results ==
Turnout 95.42% (CV) — Informal 3.78%
Party	Votes	%	Swing	Seats	Change
Labor	426,639	43.18	+6.43	6	▲3
Liberal	412,621	41.76	–5.64	5	▼3
National	12,420	1.26	+0.24	0	Steady
Liberal–National coalition	425,041	43.01	−5.41	5	▼3
Greens	68,640	6.95	+1.51		
Family First	40,031	4.05	–0.26		
Democrats	14,957	1.51	–0.37		
One Nation	1,643	0.17	–0.96		
Liberty and Democracy Party	1,637	0.17	+0.17		
What Women Want	1,455	0.15	+0.15		
Climate Conservatives	1,165	0.12	+0.12		
Independents	6,944	0.70	–1.34		
Total	988,152			11	
Two-party-preferred vote
Labor	517,818	52.40	+6.76	6	▲3
Liberal	470,334	47.60	–6.76	5	▼3
Invalid/blank votes	38,830	3.78	−1.78		
Registered voters/turnout	1,076,220	95.42			
Source: Commonwealth Election 2007

Liberal to Labor: Kingston, Makin, Wakefield.

== Results by division ==
=== Adelaide ===
2007 Australian federal election: Adelaide
Party	Candidate	Votes	%	±%
Labor	Kate Ellis	42,774	48.26	+6.34
Liberal	Tracy Marsh	34,056	38.43	−6.86
Greens	Peter Solly	8,641	9.75	+1.76
Family First	Dennis Slape	1,801	2.03	−0.03
Democrats	Sandy Biar	1,353	1.53	−0.06
Total formal votes		88,625	96.89	+1.29
Informal votes		2,840	3.11	−1.29
Turnout		91,465	94.56	+0.94
Two-party-preferred result
Labor	Kate Ellis	51,868	58.53	+7.20
Liberal	Tracy Marsh	36,757	41.47	−7.20
Labor hold		Swing	+7.20	

=== Barker ===
2007 Australian federal election: Barker
Party	Candidate	Votes	%	±%
Liberal	Patrick Secker	44,329	46.81	−6.36
Labor	Karen Lock	28,475	30.07	+8.60
National	Deb Thiele	9,695	10.24	−0.35
Family First	Phil Cornish	5,418	5.72	−0.10
Greens	Andrew Jennings	4,796	5.06	+0.98
Democrats	Justin Sneath	1,984	2.10	+0.62
Total formal votes		94,697	96.15	+2.02
Informal votes		3,793	3.85	−2.02
Turnout		98,490	95.97	+0.49
Two-party-preferred result
Liberal	Patrick Secker	56,301	59.45	−10.43
Labor	Karen Lock	38,396	40.55	+10.43
Liberal hold		Swing	−10.43	

=== Boothby ===
2007 Australian federal election: Boothby
Party	Candidate	Votes	%	±%
Liberal	Andrew Southcott	41,343	46.25	−4.37
Labor	Nicole Cornes	30,501	34.12	−1.72
Greens	Jodi Kirkby	9,137	10.22	+3.11
Independent	Ray McGhee	4,390	4.91	+4.91
Family First	Andrew Cole	2,183	2.44	−0.54
Democrats	Craig Bossie	1,380	1.54	−0.49
One Nation	Barbara Pannach	309	0.35	−0.32
Liberty & Democracy	David Humphreys	154	0.17	+0.17
Total formal votes		89,397	97.13	+1.54
Informal votes		2,639	2.87	−1.54
Turnout		92,036	95.64	+1.05
Two-party-preferred result
Liberal	Andrew Southcott	47,322	52.93	−2.44
Labor	Nicole Cornes	42,075	47.07	+2.44
Liberal hold		Swing	−2.44	

=== Grey ===
2007 Australian federal election: Grey
Party	Candidate	Votes	%	±%
Liberal	Rowan Ramsey	42,132	47.26	−9.24
Labor	Karin Bolton	34,466	38.66	+8.35
Family First	Mal Holland	4,009	4.50	−0.55
Greens	Rosalie Garland	3,669	4.12	+0.82
National	Wilbur Klein	2,725	3.06	+3.06
Democrats	Gil Robertson	1,094	1.23	−1.11
Independent	David Wright	1,050	1.18	+1.18
Total formal votes		89,145	95.75	+0.80
Informal votes		3,961	4.25	−0.80
Turnout		93,106	94.93	+0.74
Two-party-preferred result
Liberal	Rowan Ramsey	48,522	54.43	−9.39
Labor	Karin Bolton	40,623	45.57	+9.39
Liberal hold		Swing	−9.39	

=== Hindmarsh ===
2007 Australian federal election: Hindmarsh
Party	Candidate	Votes	%	±%
Labor	Steve Georganas	42,818	47.21	+4.88
Liberal	Rita Bouras	36,356	40.08	−5.80
Greens	Tim White	6,335	6.98	+1.87
Family First	Richard Bunting	1,925	2.12	−0.13
Democrats	Jen Williams	1,818	2.00	+0.43
What Women Want	Heidi Robins	662	0.73	+0.73
Independent	Clinton Duncan	619	0.68	+0.68
Liberty & Democracy	James Warry	171	0.19	+0.19
Total formal votes		90,704	96.16	+3.09
Informal votes		3,618	3.84	−3.09
Turnout		94,322	95.33	+0.62
Two-party-preferred result
Labor	Steve Georganas	49,937	55.05	+4.99
Liberal	Rita Bouras	40,767	44.95	−4.99
Labor hold		Swing	+4.99	

=== Kingston ===
2007 Australian federal election: Kingston
Party	Candidate	Votes	%	±%
Labor	Amanda Rishworth	42,212	46.65	+4.36
Liberal	Kym Richardson	35,961	39.74	−3.85
Family First	Robert Brokenshire	5,169	5.71	+0.07
Greens	Bill Weller	5,132	5.67	+0.37
Democrats	Matthew Fowler	859	0.95	−1.21
Independent	Barry Becker	505	0.56	+0.56
Independent	Alex Kusznir	380	0.42	+0.42
Liberty & Democracy	Lachlan Smith	273	0.30	+0.30
Total formal votes		90,491	96.27	+2.04
Informal votes		3,505	3.73	−2.04
Turnout		93,996	96.00	+0.69
Two-party-preferred result
Labor	Amanda Rishworth	49,247	54.42	+4.49
Liberal	Kym Richardson	41,244	45.58	−4.49
Labor gain from Liberal		Swing	+4.49	

=== Makin ===
2007 Australian federal election: Makin
Party	Candidate	Votes	%	±%
Labor	Tony Zappia	44,890	51.45	+8.43
Liberal	Bob Day	33,390	38.27	−6.44
Greens	Graham Smith	3,751	4.30	+0.51
Family First	Andrew Graham	3,096	3.55	−1.37
Democrats	Aleisha Brown	1,198	1.37	−0.38
One Nation	Robert Fechner	502	0.58	−0.26
Liberty & Democracy	Garry Vandersluis	428	0.49	+0.49
Total formal votes		87,255	95.93	+1.34
Informal votes		3,705	4.07	−1.34
Turnout		90,960	95.81	+0.34
Two-party-preferred result
Labor	Tony Zappia	50,346	57.70	+8.63
Liberal	Bob Day	36,909	42.30	−8.63
Labor gain from Liberal		Swing	+8.63	

=== Mayo ===
2007 Australian federal election: Mayo
Party	Candidate	Votes	%	±%
Liberal	Alexander Downer	45,893	51.08	−2.56
Labor	Mary Brewerton	27,957	31.12	+14.63
Greens	Lynton Vonow	9,849	10.96	+3.36
Family First	Trish Nolan	3,615	4.02	+0.37
Democrats	Andrew Castrique	1,369	1.52	−0.29
Climate Conservatives	Rachael Barons	1,165	1.30	+1.30
Total formal votes		89,848	97.24	+1.88
Informal votes		2,550	2.76	−1.88
Turnout		92,398	95.85	+0.64
Two-party-preferred result
Liberal	Alexander Downer	51,264	57.06	−6.53
Labor	Mary Brewerton	38,584	42.94	+42.94
Liberal hold		Swing	–6.53	

=== Port Adelaide ===
2007 Australian federal election: Port Adelaide
Party	Candidate	Votes	%	±%
Labor	Mark Butler	52,732	58.24	+3.73
Liberal	Brenton Chomel	22,830	25.21	−6.71
Greens	Colin Thomas	7,935	8.76	+3.34
Family First	Bruce Hambour	5,230	5.78	+1.01
Democrats	Pam Moore	1,822	2.01	+0.01
Total formal votes		90,549	95.04	+2.12
Informal votes		4,724	4.96	−2.12
Turnout		95,273	95.04	+0.70
Two-party-preferred result
Labor	Mark Butler	63,158	69.75	+6.84
Liberal	Brenton Chomel	27,391	30.25	−6.84
Labor hold		Swing	+6.84	

=== Sturt ===
2007 Australian federal election: Sturt
Party	Candidate	Votes	%	±%
Liberal	Christopher Pyne	42,731	47.17	−4.49
Labor	Mia Handshin	37,565	41.46	+6.91
Greens	Sally Reid	5,806	6.41	+0.35
Family First	Carol Jensen	3,102	3.42	−1.36
Democrats	Paul Rowse	1,054	1.17	−1.09
Liberty & Democracy	Felicity Tilbrook	327	0.36	+0.36
Total formal votes		90,595	96.54	+1.58
Informal votes		3,249	3.46	−1.58
Turnout		93,844	95.61	+0.82
Two-party-preferred result
Liberal	Christopher Pyne	46,153	50.94	−5.86
Labor	Mia Handshin	44,441	49.06	+5.86
Liberal hold		Swing	−5.86	

=== Wakefield ===
2007 Australian federal election: Wakefield
Party	Candidate	Votes	%	±%
Labor	Nick Champion	42,249	48.65	+6.28
Liberal	David Fawcett	33,600	38.69	−5.12
Family First	Bruce Nairn	4,483	5.16	−0.27
Greens	Terry Allen	3,589	4.13	−0.02
Democrats	Felicity Martin	1,016	1.17	−0.50
One Nation	Peter Fitzpatrick	832	0.96	−1.60
What Women Want	Pauline Edmunds	793	0.91	+0.91
Liberty & Democracy	Martin Walsh	284	0.33	+0.33
Total formal votes		86,846	95.34	+1.82
Informal votes		4,246	4.66	−1.82
Turnout		91,092	95.16	+0.18
Two-party-preferred result
Labor	Nick Champion	49,142	56.59	+7.26
Liberal	David Fawcett	37,704	43.41	−7.26
Labor gain from Liberal		Swing	+7.26	

== See also ==
- Members of the Australian House of Representatives, 2007–2010
