= Results of the 1996 Australian federal election in South Australia =

1996 Australian federal election (South Australia)
- 2 March 1996

All 12 South Australian seats in the Australian House of Representatives and 6 seats in the Australian Senate
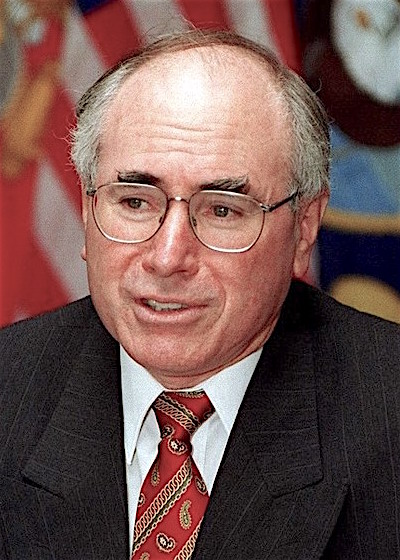

	First party	Second party
Leader	John Howard	Paul Keating
Party	Liberal/National coalition	Labor
Last election	8	4 seats
Seats won	10 seats	2 seats
Seat change	▲2	▼2
Popular vote	420,246	320,678
Percentage	50.0%	34.8%
Swing	▲4.3	▼4.0
TPP	57.3%	42.7%
TPP swing	▲4.6	▼4.6

This is a list of electoral division results for the Australian 1996 federal election in the state of South Australia.

== Overall results ==
Turnout 95.9% (CV) — Informal 4.1%
Party	Votes	%	Swing	Seats	Change
Liberal	460,246	49.99	+4.33	10	▲2
Labor	320,678	34.83	-4.01	2	▼2
Democrats	93,899	10.20	+2.41		
Greens	27,146	2.95	+2.79		
Independent	9,660	1.05	-3.64		
Natural Law	4,495	0.49	-0.98		
Grey Power	2,815	0.31	+0.12		
AAFI	1,780	0.19			
Total	959,891			12	
Two-party-preferred vote
Liberal/National Coalition	524,445	57.26	4.59	10	▲2
Labor	391,516	42.74	-4.59	2	▼2
Invalid/blank votes	39,162	4.08	0.02		
Turnout	959,881	95.89			
Registered voters	1,001,006				
Source: Federal Elections 1996

== Results by division ==
=== Adelaide ===
1996 Australian federal election: Adelaide
Party	Candidate	Votes	%	±%
Liberal	Trish Worth	35,285	47.89	+3.07
Labor	Gail Gago	27,802	37.74	−3.38
Democrats	Mark Andrews	6,052	8.21	−0.22
Greens	Tim Graham	2,028	2.75	+2.75
Independent	Dan Carey	1,142	1.55	+1.55
Grey Power	Barbara Fraser	542	0.74	+0.74
Natural Law	Peter Fenwick	322	0.44	−1.54
Independent	Jane Manifold	305	0.41	+0.41
Independent	David Bidstrup	194	0.26	−0.12
Total formal votes		73,672	95.31	−0.55
Informal votes		3,623	4.69	+0.55
Turnout		77,295	94.55	+1.18
Two-party-preferred result
Liberal	Trish Worth	39,182	53.50	+2.18
Labor	Gail Gago	34,062	46.50	−2.18
Liberal hold		Swing	+2.18	

=== Barker ===
1996 Australian federal election: Barker
Party	Candidate	Votes	%	±%
Liberal	Ian McLachlan	49,204	62.51	+2.13
Labor	Leah York	18,146	23.05	−2.74
Democrats	Dennis Dorney	7,734	9.82	+3.69
Greens	Rita Helling	2,924	3.71	+3.71
Natural Law	Chris Wells	712	0.90	−1.40
Total formal votes		78,720	96.58	+0.15
Informal votes		2,786	3.42	−0.15
Turnout		81,506	96.48	−0.77
Two-party-preferred result
Liberal	Ian McLachlan	55,554	70.89	+4.91
Labor	Leah York	22,818	29.11	−4.91
Liberal hold		Swing	+4.91	

=== Bonython ===
1996 Australian federal election: Bonython
Party	Candidate	Votes	%	±%
Labor	Martyn Evans	34,926	49.59	−6.01
Liberal	Chris Bodinar	21,824	30.99	+2.30
Democrats	Chris Kennedy	10,185	14.46	+5.01
Greens	Maya O'Leary	2,141	3.04	+3.04
	Michael Brander	1,357	1.93	+1.93
Total formal votes		70,433	95.15	+0.40
Informal votes		3,588	4.85	−0.40
Turnout		74,021	96.25	+1.62
Two-party-preferred result
Labor	Martyn Evans	41,675	59.46	−5.29
Liberal	Chris Bodinar	28,414	40.54	+5.29
Labor hold		Swing	−5.29	

=== Boothby ===
1996 Australian federal election: Boothby
Party	Candidate	Votes	%	±%
Liberal	Andrew Southcott	40,487	53.35	+0.47
Labor	Jeremy Gaynor	22,350	29.45	−4.22
Democrats	Janet Martin	10,367	13.66	+4.08
Greens	Mark Parnell	2,159	2.85	+2.85
Natural Law	Bevan Morris	521	0.69	−1.41
Total formal votes		75,884	97.27	−0.10
Informal votes		2,131	2.73	+0.10
Turnout		78,015	95.71	+0.44
Two-party-preferred result
Liberal	Andrew Southcott	46,428	61.60	+3.80
Labor	Jeremy Gaynor	28,941	38.40	−3.80
Liberal hold		Swing	+3.80	

=== Grey ===
1996 Australian federal election: Grey
Party	Candidate	Votes	%	±%
Liberal	Barry Wakelin	41,625	54.29	+10.02
Labor	Denis Crisp	27,929	36.43	−1.80
Democrats	Martin Jackson	5,298	6.91	+3.95
Greens	Julia Tymukas	1,813	2.36	+2.36
Total formal votes		76,665	96.54	+0.66
Informal votes		2,749	3.46	−0.66
Turnout		79,414	95.02	+0.40
Two-party-preferred result
Liberal	Barry Wakelin	44,681	58.54	+6.46
Labor	Denis Crisp	31,649	41.46	−6.46
Liberal hold		Swing	+6.46	

=== Hindmarsh ===
1996 Australian federal election: Hindmarsh
Party	Candidate	Votes	%	±%
Liberal	Chris Gallus	40,054	51.96	+4.27
Labor	David Abfalter	27,560	35.75	−5.30
Democrats	Pat Macaskill	5,476	7.10	+2.28
Greens	Matt Fisher	1,904	2.47	+0.60
	Andrew Phillips	992	1.29	+1.29
Democratic Socialist	Melanie Sjoberg	754	0.98	+0.46
Natural Law	Heather Lorenzon	347	0.45	−1.55
Total formal votes		77,087	95.91	+0.80
Informal votes		3,287	4.09	−0.80
Turnout		80,374	95.78	+1.13
Two-party-preferred result
Liberal	Chris Gallus	44,576	58.06	+6.42
Labor	David Abfalter	32,203	41.94	−6.42
Liberal hold		Swing	+6.42	

=== Kingston ===
1996 Australian federal election: Kingston
Party	Candidate	Votes	%	±%
Liberal	Susan Jeanes	34,023	42.89	+0.85
Labor	Gordon Bilney	31,372	39.55	−4.90
Democrats	Debbie Webb	7,890	9.95	+2.23
Greens	David Nurton	1,852	2.33	+2.33
AAFI	Evonne Moore	1,780	2.24	+2.24
Independent	Paula Newell	1,004	1.27	+1.27
Independent	John Watson	443	0.56	+0.56
Independent	Bob Campbell	381	0.48	+0.48
Natural Law	Sally Ann Hunter	327	0.41	−0.87
Independent	Patrick Muldowney	249	0.31	+0.31
Total formal votes		79,321	95.51	−0.94
Informal votes		3,726	4.49	+0.94
Turnout		83,047	96.64	+0.78
Two-party-preferred result
Liberal	Susan Jeanes	41,056	52.01	+3.46
Labor	Gordon Bilney	37,881	47.99	−3.46
Liberal gain from Labor		Swing	+3.46	

=== Makin ===
1996 Australian federal election: Makin
Party	Candidate	Votes	%	±%
Liberal	Trish Draper	35,762	44.55	+3.36
Labor	Peter Duncan	32,709	40.75	−6.04
Democrats	Tony Hill	7,404	9.22	+2.11
Greens	Henri Mueller	1,914	2.38	+2.38
Independent	Mary Newcombe	757	0.94	+0.94
Natural Law	Andrew Scott	731	0.91	−0.16
Independent	Tony Baker	726	0.90	+0.90
	Barry Illert	267	0.33	+0.33
Total formal votes		80,270	95.00	−1.36
Informal votes		4,223	5.00	+1.36
Turnout		84,493	96.49	+0.58
Two-party-preferred result
Liberal	Trish Draper	40,840	51.08	+4.79
Labor	Peter Duncan	39,106	48.92	−4.79
Liberal gain from Labor		Swing	+4.79	

=== Mayo ===
1996 Australian federal election: Mayo
Party	Candidate	Votes	%	±%
Liberal	Alexander Downer	46,920	57.02	+3.04
Labor	Peter Louca	20,714	25.17	−2.16
Democrats	Cathi Tucker-Lee	10,230	12.43	−1.15
Greens	David Mussared	2,848	3.46	+3.46
Independent	Graham Craig	1,089	1.32	+1.32
Natural Law	Anthony Coombe	488	0.59	−0.94
Total formal votes		82,289	96.89	+0.25
Informal votes		2,645	3.11	−0.25
Turnout		84,934	96.18	+1.00
Two-party-preferred result
Liberal	Alexander Downer	53,194	65.16	+4.56
Labor	Peter Louca	28,441	34.84	−4.56
Liberal hold		Swing	+4.56	

=== Port Adelaide ===
1996 Australian federal election: Port Adelaide
Party	Candidate	Votes	%	±%
Labor	Rod Sawford	35,939	48.43	−5.04
Liberal	Rick Hill	27,315	36.81	+3.81
Democrats	Maddalena Rositano	7,096	9.56	+2.78
Greens	George Apap	3,387	4.56	+4.56
Natural Law	Enid Mohylenko	475	0.64	−0.44
Total formal votes		74,212	94.44	−0.30
Informal votes		4,372	5.56	+0.30
Turnout		78,584	95.63	+1.27
Two-party-preferred result
Labor	Rod Sawford	42,153	57.05	−5.00
Liberal	Rick Hill	31,736	42.95	+5.00
Labor hold		Swing	−5.00	

=== Sturt ===
1996 Australian federal election: Sturt
Party	Candidate	Votes	%	±%
Liberal	Christopher Pyne	38,810	54.07	+14.66
Labor	George Vanco	22,906	31.91	−2.31
Democrats	Keith Oehme	7,408	10.32	+2.09
Greens	Craig Wilkins	2,078	2.90	+2.90
Natural Law	Vladimir Lorenzon	572	0.80	−0.78
Total formal votes		71,774	96.16	+0.60
Informal votes		2,868	3.84	−0.60
Turnout		74,642	95.21	+1.49
Two-party-preferred result
Liberal	Christopher Pyne	42,819	59.99	+4.28
Labor	George Vanco	28,560	40.01	−4.28
Liberal hold		Swing	+4.28	

=== Wakefield ===
1996 Australian federal election: Wakefield
Party	Candidate	Votes	%	±%
Liberal	Neil Andrew	48,937	60.87	+3.79
Labor	Mike Stevens	18,325	22.79	−3.32
Democrats	Pam Kelly	8,759	10.90	+2.00
Grey Power	Eugene Rooney	2,273	2.83	+2.83
Greens	Paul Petit	2,098	2.61	+2.61
Total formal votes		80,392	96.20	+0.15
Informal votes		3,174	3.80	−0.15
Turnout		83,566	96.62	+0.96
Two-party-preferred result
Liberal	Neil Andrew	55,965	69.96	+2.98
Labor	Mike Stevens	24,027	30.04	−2.98
Liberal hold		Swing	+2.98	

== See also ==
- Results of the 1996 Australian federal election (House of Representatives)
- Members of the Australian House of Representatives, 1996–1998
