= Results of the 2010 Australian federal election in South Australia =

2010 Australian federal election (South Australia)
- 21 August 2010

All 11 South Australia seats in the Australian House of Representatives and 6 (of the 12) seats in the Australian Senate
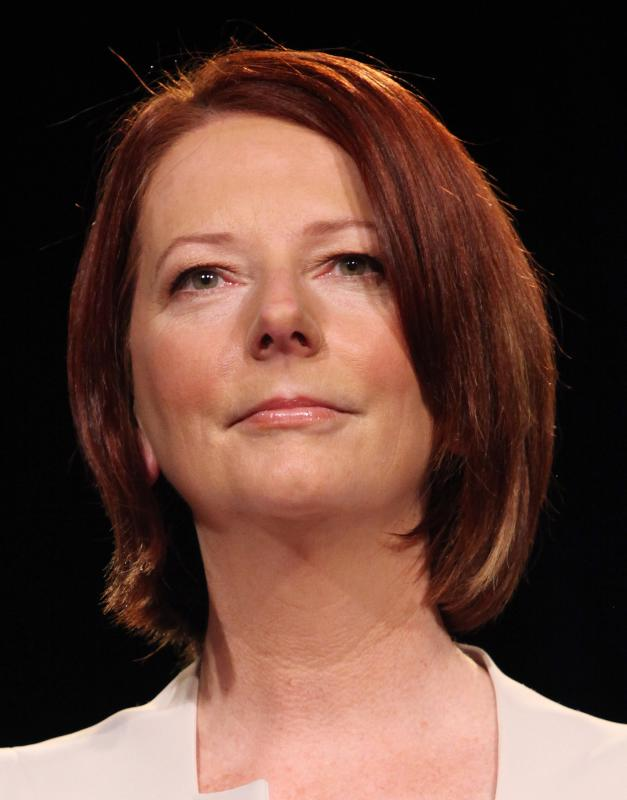

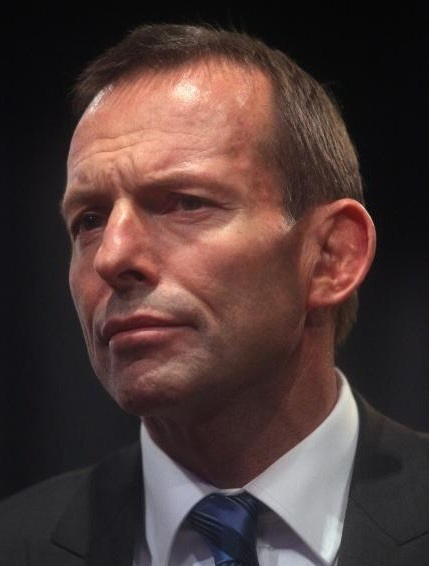
	First party	Second party
Leader	Julia Gillard	Tony Abbott
Party	Labor	Liberal/National coalition
Last election	6 seats	5 seats
Seats won	6 seats	5 seats
Seat change	Steady	Steady
Popular vote	399,279	394,003
Percentage	40.74%	40.21%
Swing	▼2.44	▼1.55
TPP	53.18%	46.82%
TPP swing	▲0.78	▼0.78
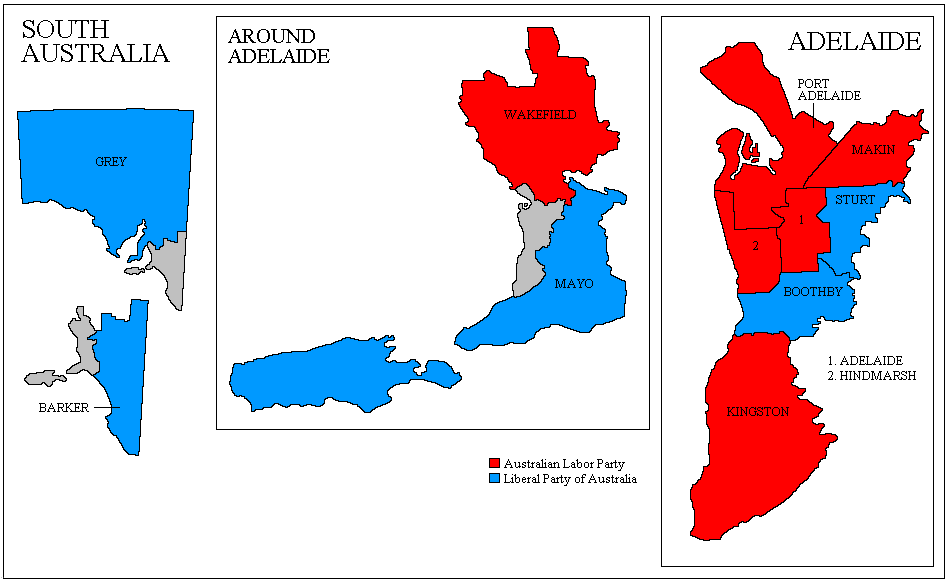
- Results by electorate

This is a list of electoral division results for the 2010 Australian federal election for the state of South Australia.

== Overall ==
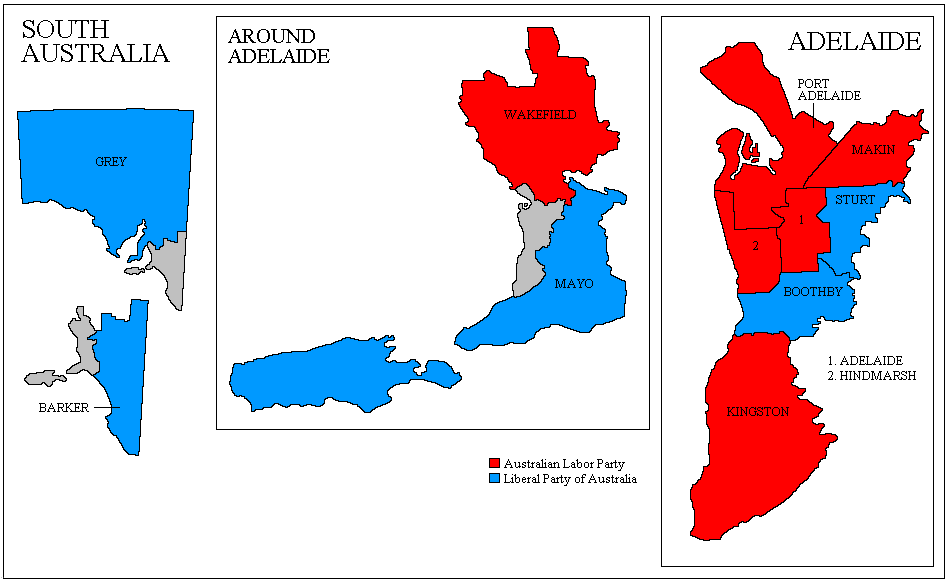
Electoral divisions: South Australia

Turnout 93.80% (CV) — Informal 5.46%
Party	Votes	%	Swing	Seats	Change
Australian Labor Party	399,279	40.74	–2.44	6	Steady
Liberal	394,003	40.21	–1.55	5	Steady
Australian Greens	117,364	11.98	+5.03		
Family First Party	48,638	4.96	+0.91		
Australian Democrats	7,020	0.72	−0.79		
Independents	5,086	0.52	–0.18		
The Climate Sceptics	3,525	0.36	+0.36		
Liberal Democratic Party	2,833	0.29	+0.12		
One Nation	1,105	0.11	−0.06		
Socialist Alliance	786	0.08	+0.08		
Secular Party of Australia	310	0.03	+0.03		
Total	979,949			11	
Two-party-preferred vote
Australian Labor Party	521,115	53.18	+0.78	6	Steady
Liberal	458,834	46.82	–0.78	5	Steady
Invalid/blank votes		56,565	5.46	+1.68	
Registered voters/turnout		1,104,698	93.83		
Source: Commonwealth Election 2010

== Results by division ==
=== Adelaide ===
2010 Australian federal election: Adelaide
Party	Candidate	Votes	%	±%
Labor	Kate Ellis	38,162	43.89	−4.37
Liberal	Luke Westley	32,673	37.57	−0.86
Greens	Ruth Beach	11,901	13.69	+3.94
Family First	Suzanne Neal	1,900	2.18	+0.15
Democrats	Marie Nicholls	819	0.94	−0.59
Socialist Alliance	Gemma Weedall	786	0.90	+0.90
Liberal Democrats	Christopher Steele	716	0.82	+0.82
Total formal votes		86,957	95.19	−1.70
Informal votes		4,394	4.81	+1.70
Turnout		91,351	92.72	−1.87
Two-party-preferred result
Labor	Kate Ellis	50,164	57.69	−0.84
Liberal	Luke Westley	36,793	42.31	+0.84
Labor hold		Swing	−0.84	

=== Barker ===
2010 Australian federal election: Barker
Party	Candidate	Votes	%	±%
Liberal	Patrick Secker	51,810	54.96	+8.15
Labor	Simone McDonnell	26,433	28.04	−2.03
Greens	Sean Moffat	8,607	9.13	+4.06
Family First	Trevor Honeychurch	5,829	6.18	+0.46
Climate Sceptics	Steven Davies	1,591	1.69	+1.69
Total formal votes		94,270	94.54	−1.61
Informal votes		5,443	5.46	+1.61
Turnout		99,713	95.07	−0.90
Two-party-preferred result
Liberal	Patrick Secker	59,278	62.88	+3.43
Labor	Simone McDonnell	34,992	37.12	−3.43
Liberal hold		Swing	+3.43	

=== Boothby ===
2010 Australian federal election: Boothby
Party	Candidate	Votes	%	±%
Liberal	Andrew Southcott	38,248	44.81	−1.44
Labor	Annabel Digance	30,515	35.75	+1.63
Greens	Fiona Blinco	11,305	13.24	+3.02
Family First	Meredith Resce	2,120	2.48	+0.04
Independent	Ray McGhee	1,689	1.98	−2.93
Democrats	Thomas Salerno	517	0.61	−0.93
Liberal Democrats	Michael Noack	339	0.40	+0.23
Climate Sceptics	Stephen Skillitzi	316	0.37	+0.37
Secular	Avi Chapman	310	0.36	+0.36
Total formal votes		85,359	95.37	−1.76
Informal votes		4,148	4.63	+1.76
Turnout		89,507	91.43	−4.25
Two-party-preferred result
Liberal	Andrew Southcott	43,317	50.75	−2.18
Labor	Annabel Digance	42,042	49.25	+2.18
Liberal hold		Swing	−2.18	

=== Grey ===
2010 Australian federal election: Grey
Party	Candidate	Votes	%	±%
Liberal	Rowan Ramsey	49,361	55.78	+8.52
Labor	Tauto Sansbury	27,514	31.09	−7.57
Greens	Andrew Melville-Smith	6,876	7.77	+3.65
Family First	Sylvia Holland	4,741	5.36	+0.86
Total formal votes		88,492	94.65	−1.10
Informal votes		4,997	5.35	+1.10
Turnout		93,489	93.66	−1.29
Two-party-preferred result
Liberal	Rowan Ramsey	54,119	61.16	+6.73
Labor	Tauto Sansbury	34,373	38.84	−6.73
Liberal hold		Swing	+6.73	

=== Hindmarsh ===
2010 Australian federal election: Hindmarsh
Party	Candidate	Votes	%	±%
Labor	Steve Georganas	39,736	44.54	−2.67
Liberal	Jassmine Wood	34,831	39.04	−1.04
Greens	Matthew Fisher	10,773	12.07	+5.09
Family First	Bob Randall	2,563	2.87	+0.75
Democrats	Greg Croke	767	0.86	−1.14
Climate Sceptics	Adrian Paech	554	0.62	+0.62
Total formal votes		89,224	94.83	−1.33
Informal votes		4,868	5.17	+1.33
Turnout		94,092	93.86	−1.51
Two-party-preferred result
Labor	Steve Georganas	49,698	55.70	+0.65
Liberal	Jassmine Wood	39,526	44.30	−0.65
Labor hold		Swing	+0.65	

=== Kingston ===
2010 Australian federal election: Kingston
Party	Candidate	Votes	%	±%
Labor	Amanda Rishworth	46,882	51.05	+4.40
Liberal	Chris Zanker	26,652	29.02	−10.72
Greens	Palitja Moore	11,264	12.27	+6.60
Family First	Geoff Doecke	5,288	5.76	+0.05
Democrats	Ron Baker	1,748	1.90	+0.95
Total formal votes		91,834	94.91	−1.36
Informal votes		4,925	5.09	+1.36
Turnout		96,759	94.59	−1.38
Two-party-preferred result
Labor	Amanda Rishworth	58,695	63.91	+9.49
Liberal	Chris Zanker	33,139	36.09	−9.49
Labor hold		Swing	+9.49	

=== Makin ===
2010 Australian federal election: Makin
Party	Candidate	Votes	%	±%
Labor	Tony Zappia	43,114	50.58	−0.87
Liberal	Liz Davies	25,740	30.20	−8.07
Greens	Jasemin Rose	8,604	10.09	+5.79
Family First	Mark Potter	5,089	5.97	+2.42
Liberal Democrats	Michael Gameau	1,081	1.27	+0.78
One Nation	Anton Horvat	662	0.78	+0.20
Democrats	Wayne Rich	534	0.63	−0.74
Climate Sceptics	Robert Stewart	409	0.48	+0.48
Total formal votes		85,233	93.91	−2.02
Informal votes		5,532	6.09	+2.02
Turnout		90,765	94.29	−1.38
Two-party-preferred result
Labor	Tony Zappia	53,014	62.20	+4.50
Liberal	Liz Davies	32,219	37.80	−4.50
Labor hold		Swing	+4.50	

=== Mayo ===
2010 Australian federal election: Mayo
Party	Candidate	Votes	%	±%
Liberal	Jamie Briggs	42,976	46.76	−4.32
Labor	Sam Davis	22,997	25.02	−6.10
Greens	Diane Atkinson	15,593	16.97	+6.01
Family First	Bruce Hicks	5,337	5.81	+1.79
Stop Population Growth Now	Bill Spragg	2,404	2.62	+2.62
Independent Protectionist	Andrew Phillips	993	1.08	+1.08
Democrats	Rebekkah Osmond	948	1.03	−0.49
Climate Sceptics	John Michelmore	655	0.71	+0.71
Total formal votes		91,903	95.42	−1.82
Informal votes		4,414	4.58	+1.82
Turnout		96,317	94.83	−1.05
Two-party-preferred result
Liberal	Jamie Briggs	52,702	57.35	+0.29
Labor	Sam Davis	39,201	42.65	−0.29
Liberal hold		Swing	+0.29	

=== Port Adelaide ===
2010 Australian federal election: Port Adelaide
Party	Candidate	Votes	%	±%
Labor	Mark Butler	48,638	53.82	−4.42
Liberal	Nigel McKenna	21,615	23.92	−1.29
Greens	Kalyna Micenko	13,659	15.11	+6.35
Family First	Bruce Hambour	6,467	7.16	+1.38
Total formal votes		90,379	92.82	−2.22
Informal votes		6,991	7.18	+2.22
Turnout		97,370	93.35	−1.52
Two-party-preferred result
Labor	Mark Butler	63,295	70.03	+0.28
Liberal	Nigel McKenna	27,084	29.97	−0.28
Labor hold		Swing	+0.28	

=== Sturt ===
2010 Australian federal election: Sturt
Party	Candidate	Votes	%	±%
Liberal	Christopher Pyne	42,418	48.05	+0.88
Labor	Rick Sarre	31,989	36.23	−5.23
Greens	Peter Fiebig	8,834	10.01	+3.60
Family First	Dale Clegg	3,346	3.79	+0.37
Liberal Democrats	Jess Clark	697	0.79	+0.43
Democrats	Darren Andrews	558	0.63	−0.54
One Nation	Jack King	443	0.50	+0.50
Total formal votes		88,285	94.62	−1.92
Informal votes		5,016	5.38	+1.92
Turnout		93,301	94.19	−1.39
Two-party-preferred result
Liberal	Christopher Pyne	47,172	53.43	+2.49
Labor	Rick Sarre	41,113	46.57	−2.49
Liberal hold		Swing	+2.49	

=== Wakefield ===
2010 Australian federal election: Wakefield
Party	Candidate	Votes	%	±%
Labor	Nick Champion	43,299	49.20	+0.55
Liberal	David Strauss	27,679	31.45	−7.24
Greens	Jane Alcorn	9,948	11.30	+7.17
Family First	Paul Coombe	5,958	6.77	+1.61
Democrats	Darren Hassan	1,129	1.28	+0.11
Total formal votes		88,013	93.78	−1.56
Informal votes		5,837	6.22	+1.56
Turnout		93,850	93.65	−1.48
Two-party-preferred result
Labor	Nick Champion	54,528	61.95	+5.36
Liberal	David Strauss	33,485	38.05	−5.36
Labor hold		Swing	+5.36	

== See also ==
- 2010 Australian federal election
- Results of the 2010 Australian federal election (House of Representatives)
- Post-election pendulum for the 2010 Australian federal election
- Members of the Australian House of Representatives, 2010–2013
