= Susan Jeanes =

Australian politician

Member of the Australian Parliament for Kingston
- In office 2 March 1996 – 3 October 1998
- Preceded by: Gordon Bilney
- Succeeded by: David Cox

Personal details
- Born: 24 February 1958 (age 68) Glenelg, South Australia
- Party: Liberal Party of Australia

Susan Barbara Jeanes (born 24 February 1958) is an Australian politician. She was a Liberal Party of Australia member of the Australian House of Representatives from 1996 to 1998, representing the electorate of Kingston. She defeated Labor MP Gordon Bilney as part of the Liberal victory at the 1996 federal election, only to lose to Labor candidate David Cox at the closer-run 1998 federal election.

By the 2002 South Australian state election, the Liberal MP for the electorate of Fisher, Bob Such, had left the party and become an independent. Jeanes won Liberal preselection for the seat but lost to Such at the election.

After her parliamentary career ended she worked as an advisor on climate change and energy policy to the then federal Environment and Heritage Minister Robert Hill. She was later appointed chief executive officer of the Renewable Energy Generators of Australia (REGA) and is a director of the Climate Institute. In November 2007 she was appointed chief executive of the Australian Geothermal Energy Association, the national industry association for the Australian geothermal energy industry.

Parliament of Australia
Preceded by Gordon Bilney	Member for Kingston; 1996–1998	Succeeded by David Cox
