= Kym Richardson =

Australian politician (born 1958)

Member of the Australian Parliament for Kingston
- In office 9 October 2004 – 24 November 2007
- Preceded by: David Cox
- Succeeded by: Amanda Rishworth

Personal details
- Born: 16 March 1958 (age 68) Adelaide, South Australia
- Party: Liberal Party of Australia
- Occupation: Police officer

Kym Charles Richardson (born 16 March 1958) is an Australian politician. He was a Liberal member of the Australian House of Representatives between 2004 and 2007, representing the South Australian electorate of Kingston.

== Early life ==
Richardson joined the South Australia Police (SAPOL) at a young age, serving in the elite Star Force unit for thirteen years. Investigated for unethical behaviour while a police officer he was precluded from receiving the National Medal, but he did receive the Police Service Medal (a SAPOL award). Richardson shared his police career with a number of other activities, only resigning from the force upon entering federal parliament in 2004.

While actively involved in police duties, he also played Australian rules football for the West Torrens club, and spent several years coaching local teams. After retiring from football, he moved into sports management. His clients included international cricketer Jason Gillespie and football player Byron Pickett. While a police officer he was charged with six counts of promoting a pyramid marketing scheme. However no evidence was tendered in the case and all charges were dropped.

== Federal politics ==
In 2003 he was approached, and this time accepted the offer to nominate for the seat of Kingston.

Kingston was held by the incumbent Australian Labor Party MP, Assistant Shadow Treasurer David Cox, by a narrow margin. Polling in the lead-up to the 2004 election suggested that Cox was likely hold the seat. Several commentators, including Antony Green, agreed with that conclusion. However, there was a swing to Richardson and the Liberal Party at the poll. After eleven days of counting Richardson overtook Cox on postal and absentee votes, eventually winning by 119 votes after preferences.

Richardson is socially conservative. In the abortion debate that occurred in 2005, he argued that abortion is unacceptable in all cases apart from when rape is involved. However he largely concentrated on the issue of road safety, a focus of much of his career with the police force. He also repeatedly advocated the extension of the Noarlunga Centre railway line to Sellicks Beach, but no federal government funding was forthcoming.

Richardson's Labor opponent for the 2007 federal election was psychologist Amanda Rishworth, who had previously stood for the State seat of Fisher. A January 2007 poll in The Advertiser showed that on two party preferred terms, Rishworth was ahead in Kingston by 56% to 44%. A July poll in the same newspaper reported that Rishworth was ahead 57% to 43%. A mid-campaign October 2007 poll in The Advertiser had the margin at 56% to 44% and Richardson's primary vote at 34%.

In October 2007, Richardson attracted controversy for pulling out of a debate on industrial relations with his Labor rival, arranging for industrial relations minister Joe Hockey to debate his challenger instead. Richardson was defeated by Rishworth at the election.

== State politics and later life ==
Richardson was preselected to contest the state seat of Mawson at the 2010 election, but he stepped down amid revelations that he faced the criminal charge of impersonating a police officer. On 14 January 2010, a pre trial hearing into the matter was heard in the Adelaide Magistrates Court. It was revealed in the pre-trial hearing that the allegation was related to an attempt to dissuade a witness from testifying in an assault case against Richardson's son. The telephone call had been traced to federal Parliament House where Richardson was then serving as an MP. Police did not proceed with a charge of impersonating a police officer as the statute of limitations had expired, and he was eventually acquitted on a charge of attempting to pervert the course of justice.

Richardson then became a real estate agent with the Morphett Vale branch of Elders Real Estate in South Australia, after a very short period he moved on to Professionals at Hallett Cove. He was elected as a councillor with the City of Onkaparinga, topping the poll for the Mid South Coast Ward in the 2010 council elections.

At the 2014 state election, he contested the seat of Kaurna as an independent and received 9.3% of the vote, finishing fourth out of five candidates.

Richardson stood again for local government election in the City of Onkaparinga in 2018 but was defeated.

In 2023 a lawsuit(subscription required) was commenced by AFL footballer Byron Pickett who alleged that while his finances were being managed by Kym Richardson that transactions were benefitting Kym Richardson's family and not Byron Pickett.

Parliament of Australia
Preceded by David Cox	Member for Kingston; 2004–2007	Succeeded by Amanda Rishworth
