= Steve Gibbons (politician) =

Australian politician (1949–2022)

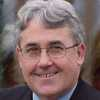

Member of the Australian Parliament for Bendigo
- In office 3 October 1998 – 5 August 2013
- Preceded by: Bruce Reid
- Succeeded by: Lisa Chesters

Personal details
- Born: Stephen William Gibbons; 11 September 1949 Melbourne, Australia
- Died: 19 July 2022 (aged 72)
- Party: Australian Labor Party
- Occupation: Trade unionist

Stephen William Gibbons (11 September 1949 – 19 July 2022) was an Australian politician who served as an Australian Labor Party member of the Australian House of Representatives from March 1998 until August 2013 representing the Division of Bendigo, Victoria.

He was born in Melbourne. He attended Golden Square Primary School and Kangaroo Flat Secondary College in Bendigo. He became an apprentice to a motor mechanic. He worked in auto part wholesaling and packaging industries.

He was a trade union official, small business proprietor and researcher and adviser to the Victorian Leader of the Opposition, John Brumby, before entering politics.

First elected to represent the Bendigo electorate in 1998, he was re-elected in 2001, 2004, 2007 and 2010. In August 2011, Gibbons announced his intention to retire from parliament at the next election.

Gibbons died in July 2022, at the age of 72.

Parliament of Australia
Preceded by Bruce Reid	Member for Bendigo; 1998–2013	Succeeded by Lisa Chesters
