= Kim Wilkie =

Australian politician

Member of the Australian Parliament for Swan
- In office 3 October 1998 – 24 November 2007
- Preceded by: Don Randall
- Succeeded by: Steve Irons

Personal details
- Born: 3 June 1959 (age 67) Perth, Western Australia
- Party: Labor
- Occupation: Farmer; Prison officer Employment officer

Kim Wilkie (born 3 June 1959) is a former Australian politician. He was a member of the House of Representatives from 1998 to 2007, representing the Western Australian seat of Swan for the Australian Labor Party (ALP).

== Early life ==
Wilkie was born in Perth on 3 June 1959. He worked a number of jobs before entering politics, including as a farmer, prison officer and employment officer with the YMCA in Victoria Park.

== Politics ==
Wilkie served on the South Perth City Council from 1993 to 1998. He was elected to the House of Representatives at the 1998 federal election, winning the seat of Swan for the Australian Labor Party (ALP) from the incumbent Liberal MP Don Randall.

In parliament, Wilkie was "heavily involved in international affairs as a member of the Joint Standing Committee for Treaties and the Joint Standing Committee for Foreign Affairs, Defence and Trade". He was also a member of the speaker's panel from 2002 to 2007. Wilkie reportedly supported incumbent Kim Beazley against Kevin Rudd in the 2006 Australian Labor Party leadership spill. In September 2006 he and Warren Snowdon were suspended from parliament in a heated debate on the Liberal government's proposed abolition of the permit system used by remote Aboriginal communities in the Northern Territory.

Wilkie's seat was marginal throughout his time in parliament. He won Swan by just over 100 votes at the 2004 election. The losing Liberal candidate Andrew Murfin had a request for a recount denied by the Australian Electoral Commission (AEC). Wilkie was in turn defeated by Liberal candidate Steve Irons by just over 150 votes at the 2007 election. He was the only incumbent Labor MP defeated at the election.

== Later life ==
In 2010, Wilkie was appointed chief executive of the Confederation of Meningitis Organizations.

Parliament of Australia
Preceded by Don Randall	Member for Swan; 1998–2007	Succeeded by Steve Irons
