= Kay Hull =

Australian politician (born 1954)

Kay Hull AO
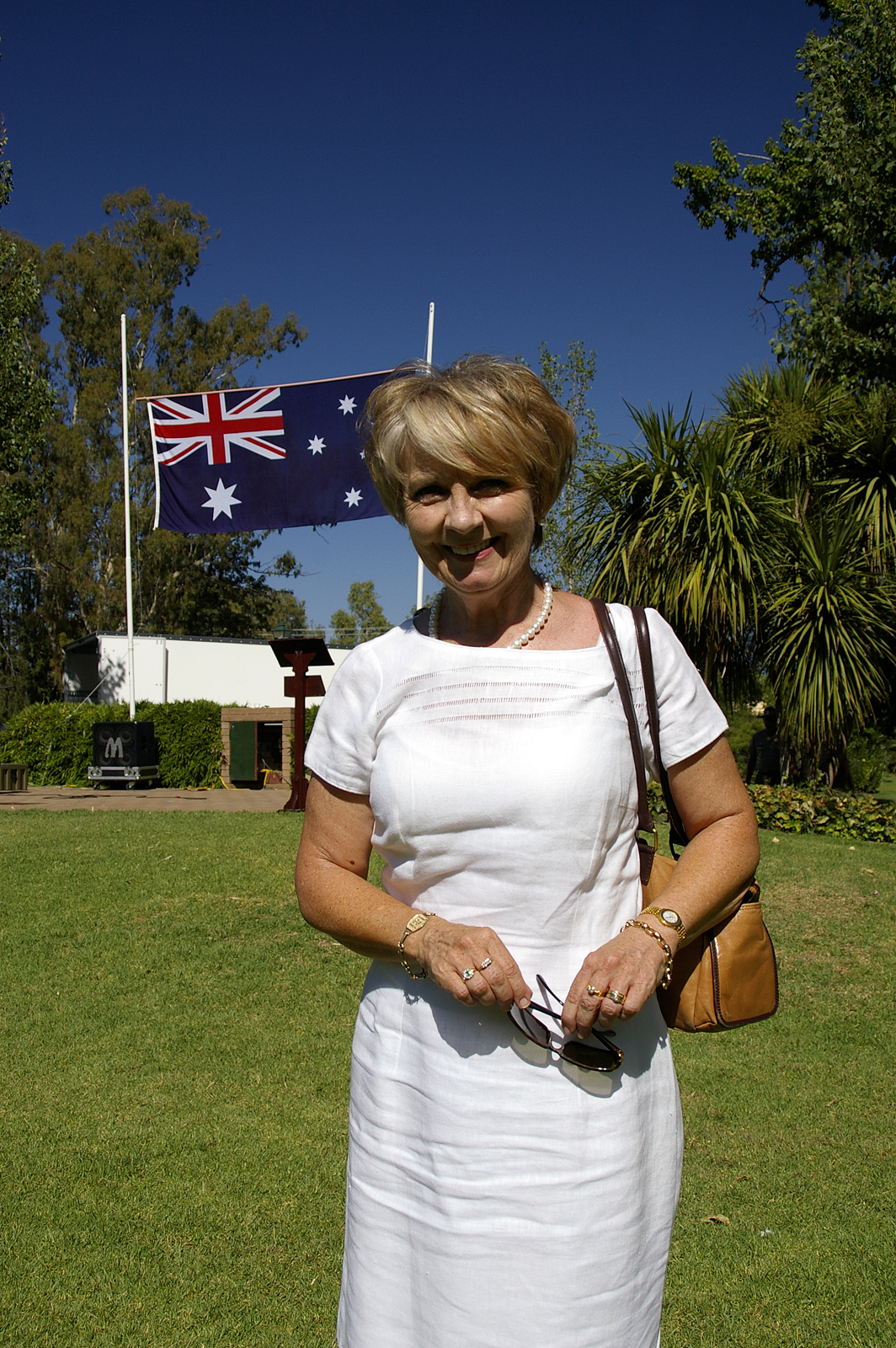
- Kay Hull in 2009

Member of the Australian Parliament for Riverina
- In office 3 October 1998 – 19 July 2010
- Preceded by: Noel Hicks
- Succeeded by: Michael McCormack

Personal details
- Born: Kay Elizabeth George; 3 February 1954 (age 72) Guyra, New South Wales, Australia
- Party: The Nationals
- Spouse: Graeme Hull
- Children: 3 sons

Kay Elizabeth Hull AO (born 3 February 1954) is a former Australian politician who served as a National Party member of the House of Representatives from 1998 to 2010, representing the Division of Riverina in New South Wales.

Hull was born in Guyra, New South Wales, and was a small business owner and operator before entering politics. She was a councillor of the City of Wagga Wagga from 1991 to 1998. A small caricature of her is displayed on a Regional Express Saab 340 aircraft.

On 6 April 2010, Kay Hull announced that she wouldn't be contesting the next Federal election, after 12 years serving the Riverina electorate.

In April 2010, Charles Sturt University named the Kay Hull Veterinary Teaching Hospital in its South Campus in honour of Kay Hull.

In May 2010, Regional Express Airlines named the Kay Hull Conference Room at the Australian Airline Pilot Academy in honour of Kay Hull.

In March 2011, she was awarded the Freedom of the City by Wagga Wagga city council for her "tenacity, resilience, courage and conviction in her representation of her constituents." Hull was appointed a member of the Order of Australia in the 2015 Queen's Birthday Honours, and was promoted to Officer of the Order of Australia in the 2021 Queen's Birthday Honours.

Parliament of Australia
| Preceded by Noel Hicks | Member for Riverina; 1998–2010 | Succeeded by Michael McCormack |
