= David Cox (Australian politician) =

Australian politician

Member of the Australian Parliament for Kingston
- In office 3 October 1998 – 9 October 2004
- Preceded by: Susan Jeanes
- Succeeded by: Kym Richardson

Personal details
- Born: 1 August 1954 (age 72) Dunedin, New Zealand
- Party: Australian Labor Party
- Education: Flinders University; University of Adelaide
- Occupation: Public servant

David Alexander Cox (born 1 August 1954), Australian politician, was an Australian Labor Party member of the Australian House of Representatives October 1998 to October 2004, representing the Division of Kingston, South Australia. He was born in Dunedin, New Zealand, and was educated at Flinders University and the University of Adelaide, where he graduated with a master's degree in business administration. He was a public servant before entering politics.

Cox was research assistant to Mick Young (a minister in the Hawke government), an advisor to ministers in the South Australian Labor government 1983-86 and 1992–93, and to federal Labor ministers Peter Walsh, Gordon Bilney, John Kerin and Ralph Willis 1986–92. He is also a grape grower.

Cox defeated Susan Jeanes in the 1998 election, becoming only the third opposition MP in Kingston's history. Cox was a member of the Opposition Shadow Ministry 2001–04. He was Shadow Assistant Treasurer between 2002–04 and Shadow Minister for Revenue 2003–04. He was defeated at the 2004 election by Kym Richardson by a margin of 119 votes.

Parliament of Australia
Preceded by Susan Jeanes	Member for Kingston; 1998–2004	Succeeded by Kym Richardson
