= Trish Draper =

Australian politician

Member of the Australian Parliament for Makin
- In office 2 March 1996 – 17 October 2007
- Preceded by: Peter Duncan
- Succeeded by: Tony Zappia

Personal details
- Born: 2 April 1959 (age 67) Woodville, South Australia, Australia
- Party: Liberal
- Website: www.trishdraper.com.au

Patricia Draper (born 2 April 1959) is an Australian former politician. She held the seat of Makin seat from 1996 to 2007.

== Early life ==
Draper was born in Woodville, South Australia, the daughter of German migrants who travelled to Australia after WWII. During her early teens she was a member of the Girl Guides and the RSPCA. Her early ambition was to become a High School Teacher, to teach economics and history. However, influenced by her mother's chosen career of nursing, at the age of 19, Trish became a nurse.

She joined the navy and completed her training as a medic specialising in surgical and theatre nursing. After leaving the navy, she moved into the area of aged care nursing, while completing her Bachelor of Arts Degree at the University of South Australia. In 1993 and 1994 Trish was elected as a student representative for the Salisbury Campus and coordinator of the Save Salisbury Campus Campaign.

== Parliamentary career ==
Draper joined the Liberal Party in 1992 and subsequently stood for pre-selection for the Makin in November 1994. Draper went on to win the seat of Makin at the 1996 Federal Election.

Draper went on to win the former Labor seat of Makin in the next three elections (1998, 2001 and 2004). In 1998, she held her seat despite holding a 1% margin before the election.

In 2000, Draper campaigned against continuing high petrol prices, calling on the Federal Government to freeze the proposed GST component of petrol excise indexation. The Prime Minister and Cabinet subsequently changed the policy to permanently abolish the GST component of petrol excise indexation.

In 2003, together with her colleague the Member for Canning Don Randall MP, Trish Draper introduced a Private Members Bill, Protection of Australian Flags (Desecration of the Flag) Bill 2003 A Bill for an Act to amend the Flags Act 1953. However the bill lapsed, and did not become law.

Draper was involved in a travel controversy when she took her boyfriend away with her to a taxpayer-funded study tour to England, Ireland, France and the Netherlands in 2004. She was forced to pay back nearly $10,000 of his expenses. Whilst Draper maintained she had done nothing wrong, the ensuing controversy lead to a review of MP travel entitlements.

== Retirement from Federal Parliament ==
In June 2006, after the death of a long serving staff member, and the sudden illness of her husband, Draper decided to retire from Federal politics. Although Prime Minister John Howard encouraged her to stay, Draper announced her intention to retire at the 2007 election. The seat fell to Labor then-record two-party vote of 57.7 percent from a then-record two-party swing of 8.6 percent. The seat became the safest of the 23 Labor won from the coalition at the election.

In the lead up to 2010 South Australian state election, Draper stood for pre-selection for the state seat of Newland. She failed to win the seat at the subsequent election.

As of 2022, Draper continues to be a member of the Liberal Party, and active in the Newland and Makin branches.

In 2022, Draper was a part of the South Australian Liberals committee to examine all aspects of how to get more women into parliament, after the Liberals preselected Jack Batty over 2 women in the Bragg Byelection and having only 2 women in the South Australian Parliament.

Parliament of Australia
Preceded by Peter Duncan	Member for Makin; 1996–2007	Succeeded by Tony Zappia
