= Barry Wakelin =

Australian politician

Barry Wakelin OAM

Member of the Australian Parliament for Grey
- In office 13 March 1993 – 17 October 2007
- Preceded by: Lloyd O'Neil
- Succeeded by: Rowan Ramsey

Personal details
- Born: 7 May 1946 Kimba, South Australia
- Died: 19 December 2023 (aged 77)
- Party: Liberal Party of Australia
- Occupation: Farmer, businessman

Barry Hugh Wakelin OAM (7 May 1946 – 19 December 2023) was an Australian politician, who was a Liberal member of the Australian House of Representatives from March 1993 until November 2007, representing the Division of Grey, South Australia. He was born in Kimba, South Australia, and was a farmer and small businessman before entering politics. In 1993, he stood as the Liberal candidate in Grey, historically one of the few country seats where Labor consistently did well. He became only the fifth non-Labor member to win it, and the second in 50 years.

While Wakelin's win was considered an upset, the election came at a very bad time for Labor in South Australia. The incumbent state Labor government was still reeling from the collapse of the State Bank of South Australia, and would be heavily defeated at the state election held later in 1993. At that latter election, Labor lost all but one seat within Grey's borders.

In 1996, Wakelin became the first non-Labor member in 53 years to be re-elected to Grey. He picked up a large swing of over six percent amid that year's decisive Coalition victory, turning Grey into a safe Liberal seat in one stroke. He held it without difficulty until his retirement in 2007.

He was father of Ten News reporter James Wakelin and father-in-law of Ten News presenter Rebecca Morse.

Barry Wakelin died on 19 December 2023 aged 77.

Parliament of Australia
Preceded by Lloyd O'Neil	Member for Grey; 1993–2007	Succeeded by Rowan Ramsey
