= Patrick Secker =

Australian politician

Member of the Australian Parliament for Barker
- In office 3 October 1998 – 5 August 2013
- Preceded by: Ian McLachlan
- Succeeded by: Tony Pasin

Personal details
- Born: 6 June 1956 (age 70) Happy Valley, South Australia
- Party: Liberal Party of Australia
- Education: Flinders University
- Occupation: Company Director

Patrick Damien "Pat" Secker (born 6 June 1956) is an Australian politician who served as a Liberal member of the Australian House of Representatives from October 1998 to August 2013, representing the Division of Barker, South Australia.

== Biography ==
Secker was born in Happy Valley, South Australia, and was educated at Flinders University, Adelaide gaining a degree in Economics and Politics. He was a primary producer, small business retailer and company director before entering politics. He was a member of the Meadows District Council 1981-83 and the Mt Barker District Council 1983–92.

Secker was Deputy Speaker of the House of Representatives and Deputy Chair of the National Capital and External Territories Joint Standing Committee of Parliament. He was Secretary of the Opposition backbench committee on Agriculture and Infrastructure as well as Chair of the Liberal Party Rural and Regional affairs Committee and a member of the Liberal Party Federal Executive and Federal Council.

Secker was booked by a police officer in April 2006 for tailgating a prime mover. He was accused of travelling half a second behind, Secker pleaded not guilty and asserted that he was travelling five seconds behind. In September 2007 he was found guilty of tailgating a prime mover by the Magistrates Court at Berri in the SA Riverland, given a $450 fine and lost one demerit point. It followed a speeding incident in 2005, at 17 km/h over the limit whilst overtaking a truck. In his defence, Secker stated:

I think I'm like most people and that's why I challenged that ruling is that when you pass a B-double you need to speed up. I think most people still do that on the basis that it's safer.

In a Liberal Party pre-selection ballot on 3 March 2012, Secker lost Liberal Party endorsement for the 2013 election to Mount Gambier lawyer Tony Pasin, only receiving 78 votes to his opponent's 164 votes.

He made his valedictory speech in parliament on 25 June 2013.

Parliament of Australia
Preceded by Ian McLachlan	Member for Barker; 1998–2013	Succeeded by Tony Pasin
