= Results of the 1993 Australian federal election in Western Australia =

Results of the 1993 Australian election in Western Australia

1993 Australian federal election (Western Australia)
- 13 March 1993

All 14 Western Australia seats in the Australian House of Representatives and 6 seats in the Australian Senate

| | First party | Second party |
|---|---|---|
| Leader | John Hewson | Paul Keating |
| Party | Liberal/National coalition | Labor |
| Last election | 6 seats | 8 seats |
| Seats won | 8 seats | 6 seats |
| Seat change | ▲2 | ▼2 |
| Popular vote | 477,088 | 381,143 |
| Percentage | 49.3% | 39.4% |
| Swing | ▲2.93 | ▲4.0 |
| TPP | 53.98% | 46.02% |
| TPP swing | ▲1.11 | ▼1.11 |

This is a list of electoral division results for the Australian 1993 federal election in the state of Western Australia.

== Overall results ==
Turnout 96.3% (CV) — Informal 2.8%
| Party | Votes | % | Swing | Seats | Change |
|---|---|---|---|---|---|
| Liberal | 474,743 | 49.01 | 5.10 | 8 | ▲2 |
| National | 2,345 | 0.24 | -2.18 | | Steady |
| Liberal/National Coalition | 477,088 | 49.26 | 2.93 | 8 | ▲2 |
| Labor | 381,143 | 39.35 | 4.01 | 6 | ▼2 |
| Greens | 55,907 | 5.77 | -1.74 | | |
| Democrats | 31,791 | 3.28 | -5.12 | | |
| Independents | 12,160 | 1.26 | 0.62 | | |
| Call to Australia | 5,409 | 0.56 | 0.56 | | |
| Natural Law | 5,095 | 0.53 | 0.43 | | |
| Total | 968,593 | | | 14 | |
Two-party-preferred vote
| Liberal/National Coalition | 522,580 | 53.98 | 1.11 | 8 | ▲2 |
| Labor | 445,462 | 46.02 | -1.11 | 6 | ▼2 |
| Invalid/blank votes | 24,992 | 2.52 | -1.19 | | |
| Turnout | 993,585 | 95.63 | | | |
| Registered voters | 1,038,968 | | | | |
Source: Federal Elections 1993

== Results by division ==
=== Brand ===
1993 Australian federal election: Brand
| Party | Candidate | Votes | % | ±% |
|---|---|---|---|---|
| Labor | Wendy Fatin | 36,413 | 48.42 | +5.58 |
| Liberal | Adrian Fawcett | 31,174 | 41.45 | +4.18 |
| Greens | Andrea Evans | 3,707 | 4.93 | −1.64 |
| Democrats | Ray Tilbury | 1,865 | 2.48 | −6.29 |
| Call to Australia | Paul Cant | 1,179 | 1.57 | +1.57 |
| Independent | Norm Dicks | 613 | 0.82 | +0.82 |
| Natural Law | Jacqui Robinson | 259 | 0.34 | +0.34 |
| Total formal votes | | 75,210 | 97.53 | +1.63 |
| Informal votes | | 1,903 | 2.47 | −1.63 |
| Turnout | | 77,113 | 95.95 | |
Two-party-preferred result
| Labor | Wendy Fatin | 40,366 | 53.70 | −1.49 |
| Liberal | Adrian Fawcett | 34,805 | 46.30 | +1.49 |
| Labor hold | | Swing | −1.49 | |

=== Canning ===
1993 Australian federal election: Canning
| Party | Candidate | Votes | % | ±% |
|---|---|---|---|---|
| Labor | George Gear | 29,187 | 44.35 | +3.86 |
| Liberal | Ricky Johnston | 28,972 | 44.02 | +3.23 |
| Greens | Daniel Bessell | 2,663 | 4.05 | −2.94 |
| Democrats | Rosslyn Tilbury | 1,688 | 2.56 | −4.76 |
| Call to Australia | Gerard Goiran | 1,683 | 2.56 | +2.56 |
| Independent | Shirley de la Hunty | 1,372 | 2.08 | +2.08 |
| Natural Law | Patti Roberts | 253 | 0.38 | +0.38 |
| Total formal votes | | 65,818 | 97.39 | +1.73 |
| Informal votes | | 1,761 | 2.61 | −1.73 |
| Turnout | | 67,579 | 95.92 | |
Two-party-preferred result
| Labor | George Gear | 33,016 | 50.19 | −1.58 |
| Liberal | Ricky Johnston | 32,772 | 49.81 | +1.58 |
| Labor hold | | Swing | −1.58 | |

=== Cowan ===
1993 Australian federal election: Cowan
| Party | Candidate | Votes | % | ±% |
|---|---|---|---|---|
| Liberal | Richard Evans | 33,472 | 47.71 | +4.99 |
| Labor | Carolyn Jakobsen | 30,982 | 44.16 | +4.22 |
| Greens | Otto Dik | 3,197 | 4.56 | −1.35 |
| Democrats | Stewart Godden | 2,113 | 3.01 | −5.60 |
| Natural Law | Suzan Miles | 398 | 0.57 | +0.57 |
| Total formal votes | | 70,162 | 97.51 | +1.76 |
| Informal votes | | 1,792 | 2.49 | −1.76 |
| Turnout | | 71,954 | 96.56 | |
Two-party-preferred result
| Liberal | Richard Evans | 35,719 | 50.93 | +1.78 |
| Labor | Carolyn Jakobsen | 34,412 | 49.07 | −1.78 |
| Liberal gain from Labor | | Swing | +1.78 | |

=== Curtin ===
1993 Australian federal election: Curtin
| Party | Candidate | Votes | % | ±% |
|---|---|---|---|---|
| Liberal | Allan Rocher | 41,417 | 59.80 | +4.87 |
| Labor | David Gilchrist | 17,340 | 25.04 | +2.16 |
| Greens | Elisabeth Jones | 6,582 | 9.50 | −0.71 |
| Democrats | Willem Bouwer | 2,368 | 3.42 | −6.50 |
| Natural Law | Diana Davies | 1,142 | 1.65 | +1.65 |
| | Jon Doust | 410 | 0.59 | +0.59 |
| Total formal votes | | 69,259 | 98.01 | +0.87 |
| Informal votes | | 1,407 | 1.99 | −0.87 |
| Turnout | | 70,666 | 95.88 | |
Two-party-preferred result
| Liberal | Allan Rocher | 45,149 | 65.22 | +2.41 |
| Labor | David Gilchrist | 24,072 | 34.78 | −2.41 |
| Liberal hold | | Swing | +2.41 | |

=== Forrest ===
1993 Australian federal election: Forrest
| Party | Candidate | Votes | % | ±% |
|---|---|---|---|---|
| Liberal | Geoff Prosser | 40,099 | 56.07 | +7.74 |
| Labor | Peter Procter | 21,964 | 30.71 | +1.48 |
| Greens | Jill Reading | 5,869 | 8.21 | −0.53 |
| Democrats | David Churches | 3,581 | 5.01 | −2.23 |
| Total formal votes | | 71,513 | 97.60 | +0.65 |
| Informal votes | | 1,760 | 2.40 | −0.65 |
| Turnout | | 73,273 | 96.82 | |
Two-party-preferred result
| Liberal | Geoff Prosser | 44,124 | 61.73 | +1.82 |
| Labor | Peter Procter | 27,350 | 38.27 | −1.82 |
| Liberal hold | | Swing | +1.82 | |

=== Fremantle ===
1993 Australian federal election: Fremantle
| Party | Candidate | Votes | % | ±% |
|---|---|---|---|---|
| Labor | John Dawkins | 35,084 | 50.20 | +7.27 |
| Liberal | John Papaphotis | 27,071 | 38.74 | +5.68 |
| Greens | Mary Salter | 4,725 | 6.76 | −3.79 |
| Democrats | Patrick Mullins | 2,247 | 3.22 | −7.14 |
| Natural Law | Tom Haynes | 755 | 1.08 | +1.08 |
| Total formal votes | | 69,882 | 97.03 | +1.67 |
| Informal votes | | 2,141 | 2.97 | −1.67 |
| Turnout | | 72,023 | 96.10 | |
Two-party-preferred result
| Labor | John Dawkins | 40,375 | 57.79 | −0.51 |
| Liberal | John Papaphotis | 29,491 | 42.21 | +0.51 |
| Labor hold | | Swing | −0.51 | |

=== Kalgoorlie ===
1993 Australian federal election: Kalgoorlie
| Party | Candidate | Votes | % | ±% |
|---|---|---|---|---|
| Labor | Graeme Campbell | 35,187 | 54.36 | +4.88 |
| Liberal | Don Green | 22,406 | 34.61 | +2.42 |
| Greens | Robin Chapple | 2,702 | 4.17 | −2.14 |
| Independent | James O'Kenny | 2,001 | 3.09 | +3.09 |
| Democrats | Shyama Peebles | 1,713 | 2.65 | −5.37 |
| Natural Law | Byron Rigby | 723 | 1.12 | +1.12 |
| Total formal votes | | 64,732 | 97.42 | +1.01 |
| Informal votes | | 1,713 | 2.58 | −1.01 |
| Turnout | | 66,445 | 89.72 | |
Two-party-preferred result
| Labor | Graeme Campbell | 38,770 | 59.94 | −0.29 |
| Liberal | Don Green | 25,907 | 40.06 | +0.29 |
| Labor hold | | Swing | −0.29 | |

=== Moore ===
1993 Australian federal election: Moore
| Party | Candidate | Votes | % | ±% |
|---|---|---|---|---|
| Liberal | Paul Filing | 39,326 | 54.81 | +5.65 |
| Labor | Christine Power | 25,089 | 34.97 | +4.03 |
| Greens | Stephen Magyar | 4,063 | 5.66 | −2.23 |
| Democrats | Libby Brown | 2,866 | 3.99 | −6.77 |
| Natural Law | Alex Novakovic | 405 | 0.56 | +0.6 |
| Total formal votes | | 71,749 | 98.15 | +0.85 |
| Informal votes | | 1,354 | 1.85 | −0.85 |
| Turnout | | 73,103 | 96.71 | |
Two-party-preferred result
| Liberal | Paul Filing | 42,125 | 58.73 | +1.81 |
| Labor | Christine Power | 29,606 | 41.27 | −1.81 |
| Liberal hold | | Swing | +1.81 | |

=== O'Connor ===
1993 Australian federal election: O'Connor
| Party | Candidate | Votes | % | ±% |
|---|---|---|---|---|
| Liberal | Wilson Tuckey | 47,777 | 68.26 | +18.21 |
| Labor | John Mason | 15,144 | 21.64 | +1.45 |
| Democrats | Pat Howe | 2,358 | 3.37 | −0.64 |
| Greens | Anne Lambert | 2,287 | 3.27 | −0.35 |
| Independent | John Dunne | 1,459 | 2.08 | +2.08 |
| Independent | Jim Lee | 963 | 1.38 | +1.38 |
| Total formal votes | | 69,988 | 97.26 | +0.30 |
| Informal votes | | 1,968 | 2.74 | −0.30 |
| Turnout | | 71,956 | 95.88 | |
Two-party-preferred result
| Liberal | Wilson Tuckey | 51,780 | 74.02 | +2.11 |
| Labor | John Mason | 18,174 | 25.98 | −2.11 |
| Liberal hold | | Swing | +2.11 | |

=== Pearce ===
1993 Australian federal election: Pearce
| Party | Candidate | Votes | % | ±% |
|---|---|---|---|---|
| Liberal | Judi Moylan | 34,777 | 51.35 | −0.80 |
| Labor | Patrick Jebb | 22,065 | 32.58 | +5.05 |
| Greens | Stephen Hall | 5,458 | 8.06 | −0.61 |
| Democrats | Peter Lambert | 3,077 | 4.54 | −5.50 |
| National | Mark Forecast | 2,345 | 3.46 | +3.46 |
| Total formal votes | | 67,722 | 97.91 | +0.92 |
| Informal votes | | 1,443 | 2.09 | −0.92 |
| Turnout | | 69,165 | 96.22 | |
Two-party-preferred result
| Liberal | Judi Moylan | 39,771 | 58.76 | −0.17 |
| Labor | Patrick Jebb | 27,909 | 41.24 | +0.17 |
| Liberal hold | | Swing | −0.17 | |

=== Perth ===
1993 Australian federal election: Perth
| Party | Candidate | Votes | % | ±% |
|---|---|---|---|---|
| Labor | Stephen Smith | 31,585 | 46.37 | +3.79 |
| Liberal | Barney Cresswell | 26,440 | 38.82 | +1.20 |
| Greens | Patsy Molloy | 3,836 | 5.63 | −2.71 |
| Democrats | Irene Knight | 1,581 | 2.32 | −5.50 |
| Call to Australia | Chris Bignell | 1,499 | 2.20 | +2.20 |
| Independent | Peter Blurton | 1,460 | 2.14 | +2.14 |
| Independent | Michael Goff | 857 | 1.26 | +1.26 |
| | Michelle Hovane | 587 | 0.86 | +0.86 |
| Natural Law | Jennifer Benjamin | 268 | 0.39 | +0.39 |
| Total formal votes | | 68,113 | 96.45 | +1.21 |
| Informal votes | | 2,507 | 3.55 | −1.21 |
| Turnout | | 70,620 | 94.99 | |
Two-party-preferred result
| Labor | Stephen Smith | 38,202 | 56.15 | +0.97 |
| Liberal | Barney Cresswell | 29,839 | 43.85 | −0.97 |
| Labor hold | | Swing | +0.97 | |

=== Stirling ===
1993 Australian federal election: Stirling
| Party | Candidate | Votes | % | ±% |
|---|---|---|---|---|
| Liberal | Eoin Cameron | 32,337 | 47.13 | +4.07 |
| Labor | Ron Edwards | 29,804 | 43.44 | +3.63 |
| Greens | Kate Boland | 3,350 | 4.88 | −1.99 |
| Democrats | Richard Jeffreys | 2,152 | 3.14 | −4.31 |
| Independent | Dean Economou | 640 | 0.93 | +0.93 |
| Natural Law | Cathryn D'Cruz | 329 | 0.48 | +0.48 |
| Total formal votes | | 68,612 | 97.47 | +1.80 |
| Informal votes | | 1,781 | 2.53 | −1.80 |
| Turnout | | 70,393 | 96.03 | |
Two-party-preferred result
| Liberal | Eoin Cameron | 35,286 | 51.47 | +1.64 |
| Labor | Ron Edwards | 33,277 | 48.53 | −1.64 |
| Liberal gain from Labor | | Swing | +1.64 | |

=== Swan ===
1993 Australian federal election: Swan
| Party | Candidate | Votes | % | ±% |
|---|---|---|---|---|
| Liberal | Bryan Hilbert | 30,565 | 45.22 | +7.60 |
| Labor | Kim Beazley | 29,750 | 44.01 | +3.46 |
| Greens | Andrew Thomson | 3,492 | 5.17 | −2.10 |
| Democrats | Don Millar | 1,733 | 2.56 | −5.45 |
| Independent | Andrew Caminschi | 807 | 1.19 | +1.19 |
| Independent | Luke Garswood | 576 | 0.85 | +0.85 |
| Independent | Isobel Weir | 415 | 0.61 | +0.61 |
| Natural Law | Anne Leishman | 260 | 0.38 | +0.38 |
| Total formal votes | | 67,598 | 97.05 | +1.40 |
| Informal votes | | 2,056 | 2.95 | −1.40 |
| Turnout | | 69,654 | 95.51 | |
Two-party-preferred result
| Labor | Kim Beazley | 33,917 | 50.22 | −2.13 |
| Liberal | Bryan Hilbert | 33,623 | 49.78 | +2.13 |
| Labor hold | | Swing | −2.13 | |

=== Tangney ===
1993 Australian federal election: Tangney
| Party | Candidate | Votes | % | ±% |
|---|---|---|---|---|
| Liberal | Daryl Williams | 38,910 | 57.02 | +2.07 |
| Labor | Jason Jordan | 21,549 | 31.58 | +4.18 |
| Greens | Mark Sundancer | 3,976 | 5.83 | −1.14 |
| Democrats | Don Bryant | 2,449 | 3.59 | −6.01 |
| Call to Australia | John Trenning | 1,048 | 1.54 | +1.54 |
| Natural Law | Ken Barrett | 303 | 0.44 | +0.44 |
| Total formal votes | | 68,235 | 97.98 | +0.76 |
| Informal votes | | 1,406 | 2.02 | −0.76 |
| Turnout | | 69,641 | 96.53 | |
Two-party-preferred result
| Liberal | Daryl Williams | 42,189 | 61.86 | +0.10 |
| Labor | Jason Jordan | 26,016 | 38.14 | −0.10 |
| Liberal hold | | Swing | +0.10 | |

== See also ==
- Results of the 1993 Australian federal election (House of Representatives)
- Members of the Australian House of Representatives, 1993–1996
