= Results of the 1990 Australian federal election in Western Australia =

Results of 1990 election in Western Australia

1990 Australian federal election (Western Australia)
← 1987	24 March 1990	1993 →

All 14 Western Australia seats in the Australian House of Representatives and 6 seats in the Australian Senate
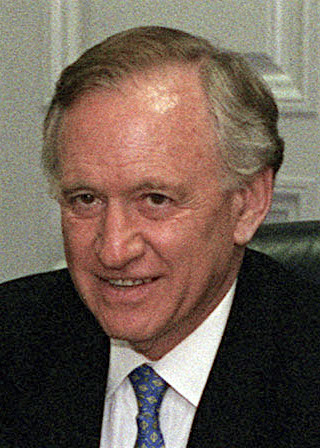

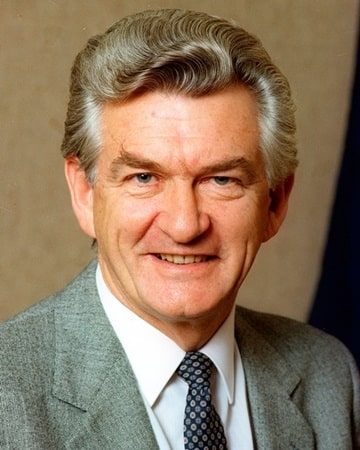
	First party	Second party
Leader	Andrew Peacock	Bob Hawke
Party	Liberal/National coalition	Labor
Last election	4 seats	9 seats
Seats won	6 seats	8 seats
Seat change	▲2	▼1
Popular vote	414,551	316,186
Percentage	46.3%	35.3%
Swing	▼2.4	▼12.2
TPP	52.87%	47.13%
TPP swing	▲3.78	▼3.78

This is a list of electoral division results for the 1990 Australian federal election in the state of Western Australia.

== Overall results ==
Turnout 94.5% (CV) — informal 3.7%
Party	Votes	%	Swing	Seats	Change
Liberal	392,870	43.91	2.12	6	▲2
National	21,681	2.42	-4.48		Steady
Liberal/National Coalition	414,551	46.33	-2.36	6	▲2
Labor	316,186	35.34	-12.14	8	▼1
Democrats	75,197	8.40	+4.97		
Greens	67,164	7.51			
Grey Power	12,043	1.35			
Independents	5,756	0.64	+0.25		
Democratic Socialist	3,336	0.37			
Pensioner	260	0.03			
Conservative	206	0.02			
Total	894,699			14	▲1
Two-party-preferred vote
Labor	420,816	47.13	-3.78	8	▼1
Liberal/National Coalition	472,092	52.87	3.78	6	▲2
Invalid/blank votes	34,418	3.70	-2.86		
Turnout	929,117	94.53			
Registered voters	982,901				
Source: Federal Elections 1990

== Results by division ==
=== Brand ===
1990 Australian federal election: Brand
Party	Candidate	Votes	%	±%
Labor	Wendy Fatin	27,303	42.8	−11.5
Liberal	Maureen Healy	23,757	37.3	+3.7
Democrats	Jan Wallace	5,590	8.8	+1.7
Greens	Luna Gardiner	4,189	6.6	+6.6
National	Errol Tuxworth	1,200	1.9	−3.1
Grey Power	Blanche Pledge	841	1.3	+1.3
Independent	Keith Evans	662	1.0	+1.0
Independent	Chris Galletly	200	0.3	+0.3
Total formal votes		63,742	95.9	
Informal votes		2,726	4.1	
Turnout		66,468	95.2	
Two-party-preferred result
Labor	Wendy Fatin	35,130	55.2	−3.6
Liberal	Maureen Healy	28,528	44.8	+3.6
Labor hold		Swing	−3.6	

=== Canning ===
1990 Australian federal election: Canning
Party	Candidate	Votes	%	±%
Liberal	Ricky Johnston	24,161	40.8	+6.3
Labor	George Gear	23,984	40.5	−11.5
Democrats	Don Bryant	4,340	7.3	+0.7
Greens	Neil Roper	4,139	7.0	+7.0
Grey Power	Arthur Robertson	887	1.5	+1.5
Independent	Phil Hooper	506	0.9	+0.9
Independent	Carol Oats	492	0.8	+0.8
Democratic Socialist	Geoff Spencer	473	0.8	+0.8
Pensioner	Bill Higgins	260	0.4	+0.4
Total formal votes		59,242	95.7	
Informal votes		2,688	4.3	
Turnout		61,930	94.9	
Two-party-preferred result
Labor	George Gear	30,596	51.8	−4.9
Liberal	Ricky Johnston	28,512	48.2	+4.9
Labor hold		Swing	−4.9	

=== Cowan ===
1990 Australian federal election: Cowan
Party	Candidate	Votes	%	±%
Liberal	Diane Airey	26,061	42.7	+1.7
Labor	Carolyn Jakobsen	24,368	39.9	−14.4
Democrats	Sarah Gilfillan	5,256	8.6	+8.6
Greens	Sally Ward	3,603	5.9	+5.9
Grey Power	Barry Smith	785	1.3	+1.3
Independent	Robert McLoughlin	414	0.7	+0.7
Democratic Socialist	Deb Thomas	321	0.5	+0.5
Conservative	Brian Guinan	206	0.3	+0.3
Total formal votes		61,014	95.7	
Informal votes		2,706	4.3	
Turnout		63,720	95.8	
Two-party-preferred result
Labor	Carolyn Jakobsen	30,982	50.9	−4.6
Liberal	Diane Airey	29,945	49.1	+4.6
Labor hold		Swing	−4.6	

=== Curtin ===
1990 Australian federal election: Curtin
Party	Candidate	Votes	%	±%
Liberal	Allan Rocher	37,183	54.9	+1.3
Labor	Stephen Booth	15,485	22.9	−10.6
Greens	Mary Salter	6,911	10.2	+10.2
Democrats	Helen Hodgson	6,711	9.9	+1.8
Grey Power	Brett Woodhill	882	1.3	+1.3
Democratic Socialist	Michelle Hovane	518	0.8	+0.8
Total formal votes		67,690	97.1	
Informal votes		1,995	2.9	
Turnout		69,685	94.0	
Two-party-preferred result
Liberal	Allan Rocher	42,406	62.8	+1.4
Labor	Stephen Booth	25,107	37.2	−1.4
Liberal hold		Swing	+1.4	

=== Forrest ===
1990 Australian federal election: Forrest
Party	Candidate	Votes	%	±%
Liberal	Geoff Prosser	31,770	48.3	+1.8
Labor	Simon Keely	19,219	29.2	−10.5
Greens	Giz Watson	5,742	8.7	+8.7
Democrats	David Churches	4,760	7.2	+1.6
National	Rick Beatty	4,245	6.5	−1.7
Total formal votes		65,736	96.9	
Informal votes		2,069	3.1	
Turnout		67,805	95.7	
Two-party-preferred result
Liberal	Geoff Prosser	39,328	59.9	+4.3
Labor	Simon Keely	26,315	40.1	−4.3
Liberal hold		Swing	+4.3	

=== Fremantle ===
1990 Australian federal election: Fremantle
Party	Candidate	Votes	%	±%
Labor	John Dawkins	28,009	42.9	−19.2
Liberal	Paul Stevenage	21,564	33.1	+1.6
Greens	Jennie Cary	6,886	10.6	+10.6
Democrats	Ray Tilbury	6,754	10.4	+10.4
Independent	Ian Bolas	1,370	2.1	+2.1
Grey Power	Ronnie Riley	657	1.0	+1.0
Total formal votes		65,240	95.4	
Informal votes		3,175	4.6	
Turnout		68,415	94.7	
Two-party-preferred result
Labor	John Dawkins	37,890	58.3	−5.5
Liberal	Paul Stevenage	27,106	41.7	+5.5
Labor hold		Swing	−5.5	

=== Kalgoorlie ===
1990 Australian federal election: Kalgoorlie
Party	Candidate	Votes	%	±%
Labor	Graeme Campbell	29,883	49.5	−4.9
Liberal	Louie Carnicelli	19,441	32.2	−3.3
Democrats	Vin Cooper	4,839	8.0	+3.6
Greens	Robin Chapple	3,815	6.3	+6.3
National	Dascia Weckert	1,810	3.0	−2.7
Grey Power	Josh Sacino	606	1.0	+1.0
Total formal votes		60,394	96.4	
Informal votes		2,248	3.6	
Turnout		62,642	89.1	
Two-party-preferred result
Labor	Graeme Campbell	36,326	60.2	+1.7
Liberal	Louie Carnicelli	23,980	39.8	−1.7
Labor hold		Swing	+1.7	

=== Moore ===
1990 Australian federal election: Moore
Party	Candidate	Votes	%	±%
Liberal	Paul Filing	30,355	49.2	+5.4
Labor	Allen Blanchard	19,105	30.9	−17.0
Democrats	Alan Lloyd	6,647	10.8	+10.8
Greens	Brian Steels	4,877	7.9	+7.9
Grey Power	Mark Watson	768	1.2	+1.2
Total formal votes		61,752	97.3	
Informal votes		1,718	2.7	
Turnout		63,470	95.9	
Two-party-preferred result
Liberal	Paul Filing	35,081	56.9	+6.3
Labor	Allen Blanchard	26,560	43.1	−6.3
Liberal hold		Swing	+6.3	

=== O'Connor ===
1990 Australian federal election: O'Connor
Party	Candidate	Votes	%	±%
Liberal	Wilson Tuckey	33,808	50.1	−2.6
National	James Ferguson	13,943	20.6	−2.5
Labor	Kim Chance	13,635	20.2	−2.6
Democrats	Huw Grossmith	2,706	4.0	+1.6
Greens	Jim Cavill	2,443	3.6	+3.6
Grey Power	Rick Finney	1,009	1.5	+1.5
Total formal votes		67,544	97.0	
Informal votes		2,116	3.0	
Turnout		69,660	95.0	
Two-party-preferred result
Liberal	Wilson Tuckey	48,514	71.9	+1.0
Labor	Kim Chance	18,947	28.1	−1.0
Liberal hold		Swing	+1.0	

=== Pearce ===
1990 Australian federal election: Pearce
Party	Candidate	Votes	%	±%
Liberal	Fred Chaney	32,424	52.2	+8.8
Labor	John Duncan	17,115	27.5	−16.9
Democrats	Peter Lambert	6,245	10.0	+6.0
Greens	Greg Bankoff	5,389	8.7	+8.7
Grey Power	Gina Pintabona	994	1.6	+1.6
Total formal votes		62,167	97.0	
Informal votes		1,924	3.0	
Turnout		64,091	95.0	
Two-party-preferred result
Liberal	Fred Chaney	36,563	58.9	+6.0
Labor	John Duncan	25,477	41.1	−6.0
Liberal notional hold		Swing	+6.0	

=== Perth ===
1990 Australian federal election: Perth
Party	Candidate	Votes	%	±%
Labor	Ric Charlesworth	28,047	42.6	−16.4
Liberal	Marylyn Rodgers	24,775	37.6	−5.9
Greens	Brenda Conochie	5,496	8.3	+8.3
Democrats	Brian Jenkins	5,152	7.8	+7.8
Democratic Socialist	Richard Cheuk	1,211	1.8	+1.8
Grey Power	Don Gudgeon	702	1.1	+1.1
National	William Witham	483	0.7	−4.0
Total formal votes		65,866	95.2	
Informal votes		3,292	4.8	
Turnout		69,158	93.4	
Two-party-preferred result
Labor	Ric Charlesworth	36,252	55.2	−5.2
Liberal	Marylyn Rodgers	29,455	44.8	+5.2
Labor hold		Swing	−5.2	

=== Stirling ===
1990 Australian federal election: Stirling
Party	Candidate	Votes	%	±%
Liberal	Jock Barker	28,257	43.1	+3.2
Labor	Ron Edwards	26,120	39.8	−10.7
Democrats	Lachlan Irvine	4,884	7.4	+2.7
Greens	Kim Herbert	4,511	6.9	+6.9
Independent	Barry Shardlow	813	1.2	+1.2
Grey Power	Eugene Hands	723	1.1	+1.1
Democratic Socialist	Jonathan Strauss	313	0.5	+0.5
Total formal votes		65,621	95.7	
Informal votes		2,971	4.3	
Turnout		68,592	94.8	
Two-party-preferred result
Labor	Ron Edwards	32,864	50.2	−4.7
Liberal	Jock Barker	32,630	49.8	+4.7
Labor hold		Swing	−4.7	

=== Swan ===
1990 Australian federal election: Swan
Party	Candidate	Votes	%	±%
Labor	Kim Beazley	26,674	40.5	−14.7
Liberal	Peter Kirwan	24,743	37.6	+1.7
Democrats	Alan Needham	5,274	8.0	+8.0
Greens	Dee Margetts	4,777	7.3	+7.3
Grey Power	Mike Hutton	2,514	3.8	+3.8
Independent	Patrick Donovan	753	1.1	+1.1
Democratic Socialist	Frank Noakes	500	0.8	+0.8
Independent	Erica Gamble	412	0.6	+0.6
Independent	Paul Auguston	134	0.2	+0.2
Total formal votes		65,781	95.6	
Informal votes		2,992	4.4	
Turnout		68,773	94.8	
Two-party-preferred result
Labor	Kim Beazley	34,351	52.4	−6.2
Liberal	Peter Kirwan	31,265	47.6	+6.2
Labor hold		Swing	−6.2	

=== Tangney ===
1990 Australian federal election: Tangney
Party	Candidate	Votes	%	±%
Liberal	Peter Shack	34,571	55.0	+0.5
Labor	Chris Keely	17,239	27.4	−9.8
Democrats	Hannah Wolfe	6,039	9.6	+3.9
Greens	Mark Schneider	4,386	7.0	+7.0
Grey Power	Andrew Wade	675	1.1	+1.1
Total formal votes		62,910	97.2	
Informal votes		1,798	2.8	
Turnout		64,708	95.5	
Two-party-preferred result
Liberal	Peter Shack	38,779	61.8	+2.7
Labor	Chris Keely	24,019	38.2	−2.7
Liberal hold		Swing	+2.7	

== See also ==
- Results of the 1990 Australian federal election (House of Representatives)
- Members of the Australian House of Representatives, 1990–1993
