= Electoral results for the Division of Cowan =

Australian division election results

This is a list of electoral results for the Division of Cowan in Australian federal elections from the division's creation in 1984 until the present.

== Members ==
Member	Party	Term
Carolyn Jakobsen	Labor	1984–1993
Richard Evans	Liberal	1993–1998
Graham Edwards	Labor	1998–2007
Luke Simpkins	Liberal	2007–2016
Anne Aly	Labor	2016–present

== Election results ==
=== Elections in the 2020s ===
==== 2025 ====
2025 Australian federal election: Cowan
Party	Candidate	Votes	%	±%
Liberal	Felicia Adeniyi			
Trumpet of Patriots	Charles Smith			
Legalise Cannabis	John Bell			
Greens	Matthew Count			
One Nation	Bradley Yates			
Independent	Wade McDonald			
Christians	Wesley D'Costa			
Labor	Anne Aly			
Total formal votes				
Informal votes				
Turnout				

==== 2022 ====
2022 Australian federal election: Cowan
Party	Candidate	Votes	%	±%
Labor	Anne Aly	46,712	46.86	+9.03
Liberal	Vince Connelly	30,328	30.42	−9.65
Greens	Isabella Tripp	9,829	9.86	−1.22
One Nation	Tyler Walsh	2,839	2.85	−1.81
United Australia	Claire Hand	2,423	2.43	+0.18
Christians	Sylvia Iradukunda	1,859	1.86	+0.03
Animal Justice	Michael Anagno	1,775	1.78	+1.78
Western Australia	Roland Laverack	1,714	1.72	+0.52
Federation	Michael Calautti	1,125	1.13	+1.13
Liberal Democrats	Micah van Krieken	1,080	1.08	+1.08
Total formal votes		99,684	92.54	−1.70
Informal votes		8,039	7.46	+1.70
Turnout		107,723	87.86	−2.83
Two-party-preferred result
Labor	Anne Aly	60,625	60.82	+9.96
Liberal	Vince Connelly	39,059	39.18	−9.96
Labor hold		Swing	+9.96	

Alluvial diagram for preference flows in the seat of Cowan in the 2022 federal election. indicates at what stage the winning candidate had over 50% of the votes and was declared the winner.

=== Elections in the 2010s ===
==== 2019 ====
2019 Australian federal election: Cowan
Party	Candidate	Votes	%	±%
Liberal	Isaac Stewart	33,438	39.41	−2.81
Labor	Anne Aly	32,353	38.13	−3.55
Greens	Mark Cooper	8,551	10.08	+2.48
One Nation	Sheila Mundy	4,777	5.63	+5.63
United Australia	Peter Westcott	2,171	2.56	+2.56
Christians	Andre Lebrasse	1,981	2.33	−0.96
Shooters, Fishers, Farmers	Paul Bedford	1,582	1.86	−0.95
Total formal votes		84,853	94.59	+0.06
Informal votes		4,850	5.41	−0.06
Turnout		89,703	90.91	+1.31
Two-party-preferred result
Labor	Anne Aly	43,135	50.83	+0.15
Liberal	Isaac Stewart	41,718	49.17	−0.15
Labor hold		Swing	+0.15	

==== 2016 ====
2016 Australian federal election: Cowan
Party	Candidate	Votes	%	±%
Liberal	Luke Simpkins	34,405	42.22	−4.36
Labor	Anne Aly	33,966	41.68	+6.90
Greens	Sheridan Young	6,193	7.60	−0.18
Christians	Rex Host	2,680	3.29	+0.90
Shooters, Fishers, Farmers	Jamie Chester	2,288	2.81	+2.81
Liberal Democrats	Neil Hamilton	1,096	1.34	+1.34
Mature Australia	Steve Veness	868	1.07	+1.07
Total formal votes		81,496	94.53	+0.09
Informal votes		4,712	5.47	−0.09
Turnout		86,208	89.60	−2.07
Two-party-preferred result
Labor	Anne Aly	41,301	50.68	+5.20
Liberal	Luke Simpkins	40,195	49.32	−5.20
Labor gain from Liberal		Swing	+5.20	

==== 2013 ====
2013 Australian federal election: Cowan
Party	Candidate	Votes	%	±%
Liberal	Luke Simpkins	41,849	49.59	−0.47
Labor	Tristan Cockman	27,248	32.29	−0.16
Greens	Adam Collins	6,677	7.91	−4.62
Palmer United	Vimal Sharma	4,501	5.33	+5.33
Christians	David Kingston	1,802	2.14	+2.14
Family First	Che Tam Nguyen	1,442	1.71	−0.65
Rise Up Australia	Sheila Mundy	869	1.03	+1.03
Total formal votes		84,388	94.90	+0.02
Informal votes		4,536	5.10	−0.02
Turnout		88,924	93.09	−1.14
Two-party-preferred result
Liberal	Luke Simpkins	48,487	57.46	+1.17
Labor	Tristan Cockman	35,901	42.54	−1.17
Liberal hold		Swing	+1.17	

==== 2010 ====
2010 Australian federal election: Cowan
Party	Candidate	Votes	%	±%
Liberal	Luke Simpkins	40,077	50.06	+4.75
Labor	Chas Hopkins	25,975	32.45	−9.91
Greens	Rob Phillips	10,033	12.53	+6.83
Christian Democrats	David Kingston	2,081	2.60	+0.70
Family First	Alan Leach	1,888	2.36	+0.64
Total formal votes		80,054	94.88	−0.96
Informal votes		4,320	5.12	+0.96
Turnout		84,374	94.22	−0.37
Two-party-preferred result
Liberal	Luke Simpkins	45,062	56.29	+5.01
Labor	Chas Hopkins	34,992	43.71	−5.01
Liberal hold		Swing	+5.01	

=== Elections in the 2000s ===
==== 2007 ====
2007 Australian federal election: Cowan
Party	Candidate	Votes	%	±%
Liberal	Luke Simpkins	38,872	45.81	+1.42
Labor	Liz Prime	35,633	41.99	−1.88
Greens	Johannes Herrmann	4,778	5.63	+0.04
Christian Democrats	Martin Firth	1,584	1.87	−0.58
Family First	Rhonda Hamersley	1,452	1.71	+1.71
Liberty & Democracy	Ken Lee	1,003	1.18	+1.18
One Nation	Dave Tierney	783	0.92	−1.09
Independent	Norm Ramsay	558	0.66	+0.66
Citizens Electoral Council	Roger Blakeway	195	0.23	−0.14
Total formal votes		84,858	95.84	+0.85
Informal votes		3,679	4.16	−0.85
Turnout		88,537	94.79	+0.62
Two-party-preferred result
Liberal	Luke Simpkins	43,883	51.71	+2.49
Labor	Liz Prime	40,975	48.29	−2.49
Liberal gain from Labor		Swing	+2.49	

==== 2004 ====
2004 Australian federal election: Cowan
Party	Candidate	Votes	%	±%
Liberal	Luke Simpkins	33,905	44.39	+8.27
Labor	Graham Edwards	33,510	43.87	−3.88
Greens	Glen George	4,272	5.59	+1.53
Christian Democrats	Richard Leeder	1,873	2.45	+0.91
One Nation	Clem Winton	1,538	2.01	−3.67
Democrats	Sarah Gilfillan	1,002	1.31	−2.97
Citizens Electoral Council	Basil Atkins	282	0.37	+0.37
Total formal votes		76,382	94.99	−0.34
Informal votes		4,032	5.01	+0.34
Turnout		80,414	94.17	−1.55
Two-party-preferred result
Labor	Graham Edwards	38,784	50.78	−4.73
Liberal	Luke Simpkins	37,598	49.22	+4.73
Labor hold		Swing	−4.73	

==== 2001 ====
2001 Australian federal election: Cowan
Party	Candidate	Votes	%	±%
Labor	Graham Edwards	34,703	47.75	+4.14
Liberal	Andre Shannon	26,250	36.12	−2.72
One Nation	Ron Holt	4,130	5.68	−2.39
Democrats	Tracy Chaloner	3,111	4.28	+0.34
Greens	Dave Fort	2,951	4.06	+0.16
Christian Democrats	Paul Salmon	1,117	1.54	+0.36
National	Sue Metcalf	410	0.56	+0.56
Total formal votes		72,672	95.33	−0.84
Informal votes		3,564	4.67	+0.84
Turnout		76,236	96.06	
Two-party-preferred result
Labor	Graham Edwards	40,341	55.51	+2.40
Liberal	Andre Shannon	32,331	44.49	−2.40
Labor hold		Swing	+2.40	

=== Elections in the 1990s ===
==== 1998 ====
1998 Australian federal election: Cowan
Party	Candidate	Votes	%	±%
Labor	Graham Edwards	31,312	43.89	+4.19
Liberal	Richard Evans	27,797	38.96	−6.25
One Nation	Ron Holt	5,777	8.10	+8.10
Democrats	Craig Wakeford	2,847	3.99	−3.35
Greens	Miguel Costello	2,760	3.87	−0.46
Christian Democrats	Phillip Hayes	850	1.19	+1.19
Total formal votes		71,343	96.14	−0.32
Informal votes		2,863	3.86	+0.32
Turnout		74,206	96.14	+0.21
Two-party-preferred result
Labor	Graham Edwards	38,208	53.56	+7.62
Liberal	Richard Evans	33,135	46.44	−7.62
Labor gain from Liberal		Swing	+7.62	

==== 1996 ====
1996 Australian federal election: Cowan
Party	Candidate	Votes	%	±%
Liberal	Richard Evans	35,083	46.44	−1.27
Labor	Carolyn Jakobsen	31,416	41.58	−2.57
Democrats	Sue Coyne	5,734	7.59	+4.58
Greens	Otto Dik	3,315	4.39	−0.17
Total formal votes		75,548	96.35	−1.16
Informal votes		2,864	3.65	+1.16
Turnout		78,412	95.93	−0.63
Two-party-preferred result
Liberal	Richard Evans	39,385	52.39	+1.46
Labor	Carolyn Jakobsen	35,788	47.61	−1.46
Liberal hold		Swing	+1.46	

==== 1993 ====
1993 Australian federal election: Cowan
Party	Candidate	Votes	%	±%
Liberal	Richard Evans	33,472	47.71	+4.99
Labor	Carolyn Jakobsen	30,982	44.16	+4.22
Greens	Otto Dik	3,197	4.56	−1.35
Democrats	Stewart Godden	2,113	3.01	−5.60
Natural Law	Suzan Miles	398	0.57	+0.57
Total formal votes		70,162	97.51	+1.76
Informal votes		1,792	2.49	−1.76
Turnout		71,954	96.56	
Two-party-preferred result
Liberal	Richard Evans	35,719	50.93	+1.78
Labor	Carolyn Jakobsen	34,412	49.07	−1.78
Liberal gain from Labor		Swing	+1.78	

==== 1990 ====
1990 Australian federal election: Cowan
Party	Candidate	Votes	%	±%
Liberal	Diane Airey	26,061	42.7	+1.7
Labor	Carolyn Jakobsen	24,368	39.9	−14.4
Democrats	Sarah Gilfillan	5,256	8.6	+8.6
Greens	Sally Ward	3,603	5.9	+5.9
Grey Power	Barry Smith	785	1.3	+1.3
Independent	Robert McLoughlin	414	0.7	+0.7
Democratic Socialist	Deb Thomas	321	0.5	+0.5
Conservative	Brian Guinan	206	0.3	+0.3
Total formal votes		61,014	95.7	
Informal votes		2,706	4.3	
Turnout		63,720	95.8	
Two-party-preferred result
Labor	Carolyn Jakobsen	30,982	50.9	−4.6
Liberal	Diane Airey	29,945	49.1	+4.6
Labor hold		Swing	−4.6	

=== Elections in the 1980s ===
==== 1987 ====
1987 Australian federal election: Cowan
Party	Candidate	Votes	%	±%
Labor	Carolyn Jakobsen	32,481	52.0	+0.8
Liberal	Paul Filing	27,048	43.3	+0.3
National	Neil Baker	2,973	4.8	+4.8
Total formal votes		62,502	93.6	
Informal votes		4,240	6.4	
Turnout		66,742	94.8	
Two-party-preferred result
Labor	Carolyn Jakobsen	33,241	53.2	−0.8
Liberal	Paul Filing	29,260	46.8	+0.8
Labor hold		Swing	−0.8	

==== 1984 ====
1984 Australian federal election: Cowan
Party	Candidate	Votes	%	±%
Labor	Carolyn Jakobsen	27,373	51.2	−4.1
Liberal	Jeff Roberts	22,969	43.0	+3.6
Democrats	Alan Needham	3,081	5.8	+0.6
Total formal votes		53,423	92.7	
Informal votes		4,195	7.3	
Turnout		57,618	94.7	
Two-party-preferred result
Labor	Carolyn Jakobsen	28,849	54.0	−3.9
Liberal	Jeff Roberts	24,574	46.0	+3.9
Labor notional hold		Swing	−3.9	
