= Results of the 1984 Australian federal election in Western Australia =

1984 Australian federal election (Western Australia)
← 1983	1 December 1984	1987 →

All 13 Western Australian seats in the Australian House of Representatives and 7 seats in the Australian Senate
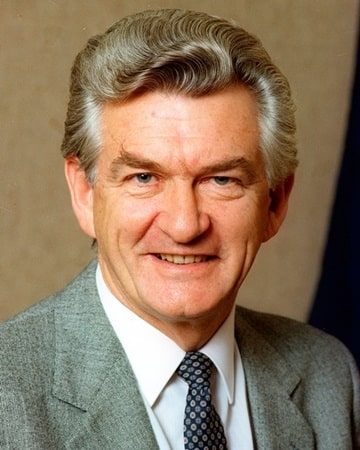

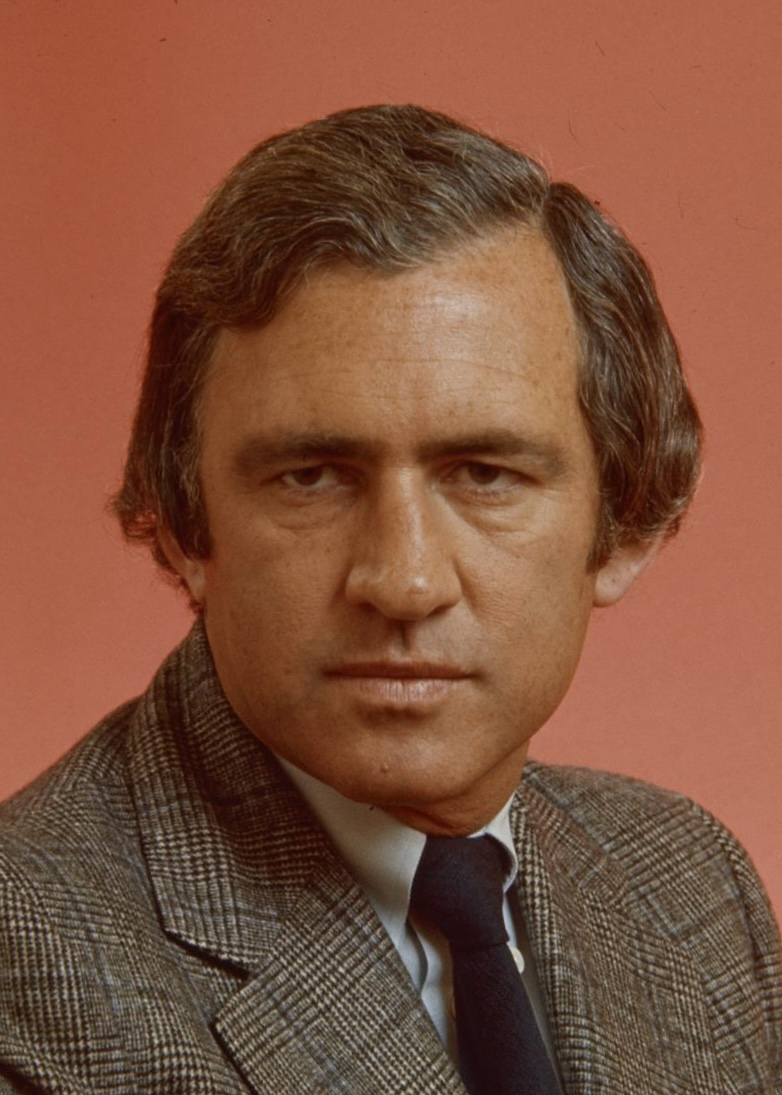
	First party	Second party
Leader	Bob Hawke	Andrew Peacock
Party	Labor	Liberal/National coalition
Last election	8 seats	3 seats
Seats won	9 seats	4 seats
Seat change	▲1	▲1
Popular vote	359,810	351,317
Percentage	48.2%	47.1%
Swing	▼3.8	▲3.9
TPP	50.9%	49.1%
TPP swing	▼0.6	▲0.6

This is a list of electoral division results for the Australian 1984 federal election in the state of Western Australia.

== Overall results ==
Turnout 95.1% (CV) — Informal 8.2%
Party	Votes	%	Swing	Seats	Change
Liberal	341,500	45.74	3.92	4	▲1
National	9,817	1.31	-0.02		Steady
Liberal/National Coalition	351,317	47.05	3.90	4	▲1
Labor	359,810	48.19	-3.76	9	▲1
Democrats	27,598	3.70	-0.32		
Independents	3,791	0.51	0.06		
Nuclear Disarmament	2,623	0.35			
Socialist Workers	1,535	0.21	-0.09		
Total	746,674			13	▲2
Two-party-preferred vote
Labor	379,731	50.86	2.27	9	▲1
Liberal/National Coalition	366,912	49.14	-2.27	4	▲1
Invalid/blank votes	59,801	7.42	5.44		
Turnout	806,475	93.82			
Registered voters	859,623				
Source: Federal Election Results 1949-1993

== Results by division ==
=== Brand ===
1984 Australian federal election: Brand
Party	Candidate	Votes	%	±%
Labor	Wendy Fatin	29,321	53.5	−2.1
Liberal	Christopher Boyle	23,633	43.1	+3.5
Independent	Thomas Renfrey	1,820	3.3	+3.3
Total formal votes		54,774	90.7	
Informal votes		5,592	9.3	
Turnout		60,366	94.4	
Two-party-preferred result
Labor	Wendy Fatin	30,420	55.5	−1.7
Liberal	Christopher Boyle	24,349	44.5	+1.7
Labor notional hold		Swing	−1.7	

=== Canning ===
1984 Australian federal election: Canning
Party	Candidate	Votes	%	±%
Labor	George Gear	27,415	50.6	−2.4
Liberal	Ricky Johnston	23,430	43.2	+0.5
Democrats	Elizabeth Capill	3,363	6.2	+1.9
Total formal votes		54,208	91.2	
Informal votes		5,216	8.8	
Turnout		59,424	94.7	
Two-party-preferred result
Labor	George Gear	29,174	53.8	−1.8
Liberal	Ricky Johnston	25,031	46.2	+1.8
Labor hold		Swing	−1.8	

=== Cowan ===
1984 Australian federal election: Cowan
Party	Candidate	Votes	%	±%
Labor	Carolyn Jakobsen	27,373	51.2	−4.1
Liberal	Jeff Roberts	22,969	43.0	+3.6
Democrats	Alan Needham	3,081	5.8	+0.6
Total formal votes		53,423	92.7	
Informal votes		4,195	7.3	
Turnout		57,618	94.7	
Two-party-preferred result
Labor	Carolyn Jakobsen	28,849	54.0	−3.9
Liberal	Jeff Roberts	24,574	46.0	+3.9
Labor notional hold		Swing	−3.9	

=== Curtin ===
1984 Australian federal election: Curtin
Party	Candidate	Votes	%	±%
Liberal	Allan Rocher	34,519	56.2	+3.6
Labor	Beth Schultz	22,205	36.2	−4.3
Democrats	Marjorie McKercher	4,690	7.6	+0.7
Total formal votes		61,414	94.2	
Informal votes		3,774	5.8	
Turnout		65,188	93.5	
Two-party-preferred result
Liberal	Allan Rocher	36,463	59.4	+4.0
Labor	Beth Schultz	24,942	40.6	−4.0
Liberal hold		Swing	+4.0	

=== Forrest ===
1984 Australian federal election: Forrest
Party	Candidate	Votes	%	±%
Liberal	Peter Drummond	30,009	50.4	+1.9
Labor	Peter Holland	27,177	45.7	+0.1
Democrats	Anne Fussell	1,701	2.9	−0.8
Independent	Alfred Bussell	646	1.1	−1.2
Total formal votes		59,533	93.8	
Informal votes		3,942	6.2	
Turnout		63,475	95.4	
Two-party-preferred result
Liberal	Peter Drummond	31,202	52.4	+1.4
Labor	Peter Holland	28,327	47.6	−1.4
Liberal hold		Swing	+1.4	

=== Fremantle ===
1984 Australian federal election: Fremantle
Party	Candidate	Votes	%	±%
Labor	John Dawkins	33,366	59.0	−2.7
Liberal	Max Adams	19,152	33.9	+0.1
Democrats	Shirley de la Hunty	3,362	5.9	+3.4
Independent	Timothy Peach	650	1.1	+1.1
Total formal votes		56,530	90.9	
Informal votes		5,634	9.1	
Turnout		62,164	94.7	
Two-party-preferred result
Labor	John Dawkins	35,631	63.0	−1.9
Liberal	Max Adams	20,889	37.0	+1.9
Labor hold		Swing	−1.9	

=== Kalgoorlie ===
1984 Australian federal election: Kalgoorlie
Party	Candidate	Votes	%	±%
Labor	Graeme Campbell	27,903	51.3	−3.8
Liberal	Douglas Krepp	22,241	40.9	+1.9
Nuclear Disarmament	David Nourish	2,623	4.8	+4.8
Democrats	William Mason	1,649	3.0	+0.0
Total formal votes		54,416	92.4	
Informal votes		4,485	7.6	
Turnout		58,901	87.3	
Two-party-preferred result
Labor	Graeme Campbell	30,476	56.0	−2.0
Liberal	Douglas Krepp	23,940	44.0	+2.0
Labor hold		Swing	−2.0	

=== Moore ===
1984 Australian federal election: Moore
Party	Candidate	Votes	%	±%
Labor	Allen Blanchard	29,672	55.1	−1.1
Liberal	Rita Waters	24,164	44.9	+6.4
Total formal votes		53,836	93.9	
Informal votes		3,519	6.1	
Turnout		57,355	94.1	
Labor hold		Swing	−4.21	

=== O'Connor ===
1984 Australian federal election: O'Connor
Party	Candidate	Votes	%	±%
Liberal	Wilson Tuckey	33,405	53.6	+7.6
Labor	Kim Chance	17,382	27.9	−6.7
National	James Ferguson	9,817	15.7	−0.3
Democrats	Denis Kidby	1,740	2.8	−0.7
Total formal votes		62,344	94.0	
Informal votes		3,976	6.0	
Turnout		66,320	95.1	
Two-party-preferred result
Liberal	Wilson Tuckey	43,140	69.2	+7.7
Labor	Kim Chance	19,204	30.8	−7.7
Liberal hold		Swing	+7.7	

=== Perth ===
1984 Australian federal election: Perth
Party	Candidate	Votes	%	±%
Labor	Ric Charlesworth	32,906	55.2	−1.3
Liberal	Joan Walters	25,148	42.2	+1.5
Socialist Workers	Catherine Brown	1,535	2.6	+2.6
Total formal votes		59,589	91.3	
Informal votes		5,670	8.7	
Turnout		65,259	93.6	
Two-party-preferred result
Labor	Ric Charlesworth	33,523	56.3	−1.9
Liberal	Joan Walters	26,066	43.7	+1.9
Labor hold		Swing	−1.9	

=== Stirling ===
1984 Australian federal election: Stirling
Party	Candidate	Votes	%	±%
Labor	Ron Edwards	29,736	49.7	−3.0
Liberal	Greg Hancock	26,994	45.1	+1.9
Democrats	Terence Barrett	2,421	4.0	−0.1
Independent	Eric Martin	675	1.1	+1.1
Total formal votes		59,826	92.4	
Informal votes		4,887	7.6	
Turnout		64,713	94.2	
Two-party-preferred result
Labor	Ron Edwards	31,380	52.5	−2.7
Liberal	Greg Hancock	28,446	47.5	+2.7
Labor hold		Swing	−2.7	

=== Swan ===
1984 Australian federal election: Swan
Party	Candidate	Votes	%	±%
Labor	Kim Beazley	32,376	54.2	−4.4
Liberal	Frank Hayes	24,305	40.7	+4.6
Democrats	Linda Mottram	3,077	5.1	+0.8
Total formal votes		59,758	91.8	
Informal votes		5,352	8.2	
Turnout		65,110	93.2	
Two-party-preferred result
Labor	Kim Beazley	34,044	57.0	−5.1
Liberal	Frank Hayes	25,714	43.0	+5.1
Labor hold		Swing	−5.1	

=== Tangney ===
1984 Australian federal election: Tangney
Party	Candidate	Votes	%	±%
Liberal	Peter Shack	31,531	55.3	+6.9
Labor	David Dale	22,978	40.3	−5.7
Democrats	Ron Murray	2,514	4.4	+0.6
Total formal votes		57,023	94.1	
Informal votes		3,557	5.9	
Turnout		60,580	95.0	
Two-party-preferred result
Liberal	Peter Shack	32,934	57.8	+7.6
Labor	David Dale	24,089	42.2	−7.6
Liberal hold		Swing	+7.6	

== See also ==
- Results of the 1984 Australian federal election (House of Representatives)
- Members of the Australian House of Representatives, 1984–1987
