= Results of the 1987 Australian federal election in Western Australia =

1987 Australian federal election (Western Australia)
← 1984	11 July 1987	1990 →

All 13 Western Australia seats in the Australian House of Representatives and all 12 seats in the Australian Senate
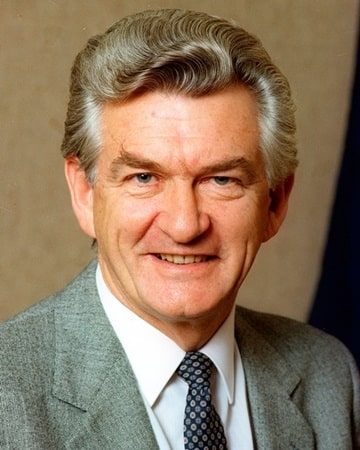

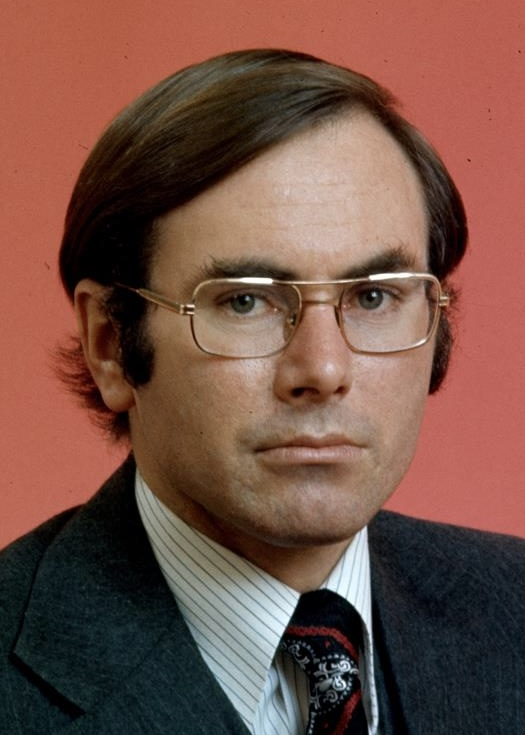
	First party	Second party
Leader	Bob Hawke	John Howard
Party	Labor	Liberal/National coalition
Last election	9 seats	4 seats
Seats won	9 seats	4 seats
Seat change	Steady	Steady
Popular vote	377,493	387,137
Percentage	47.5%	48.7%
Swing	▼0.7	▲1.7
TPP	50.9%	49.1%
TPP swing	▼0.1	▲0.1

This is a list of electoral division results for the Australian 1987 federal election in the state of Western Australia.

== Overall results ==
Turnout 92.2% (CV) — Informal 3.4%
Party	Votes	%	Swing	Seats	Change
Liberal	332,266	41.79	-3.95	4	Steady
National	54,871	6.90	5.59		Steady
Liberal/National Coalition	387,137	48.69	1.64	4	Steady
Labor	377,493	47.48	-0.71	9	Steady
Democrats	27,302	3.43	-0.27		
Independents	3,112	0.39	-0.12		
Total	795,044			13	
Two-party-preferred vote
Labor	404,751	50.91	-0.05	9	Steady
Liberal/National Coalition	390,232	49.09	0.05	4	Steady
Invalid/blank votes	55,776	6.56	-0.86		
Turnout	850,820	93.84			
Registered voters	906,677				
Source: Psephos Adam Carr's Election Archive 1987

== Results by division ==
=== Brand ===
1987 Australian federal election: Brand
Party	Candidate	Votes	%	±%
Labor	Wendy Fatin	32,135	52.2	−1.3
Liberal	Bernie Masters	21,985	35.7	−7.4
Democrats	John Willis	4,368	7.1	+7.1
National	Peter Bass	3,091	5.0	+5.0
Total formal votes		61,579	92.3	
Informal votes		5,112	7.7	
Turnout		66,691	95.1	
Two-party-preferred result
Labor	Wendy Fatin	34,906	56.7	+1.2
Liberal	Bernie Masters	26,669	43.3	−1.2
Labor hold		Swing	+1.2	

=== Canning ===
1987 Australian federal election: Canning
Party	Candidate	Votes	%	±%
Labor	George Gear	29,223	49.1	−1.5
Liberal	Ricky Johnston	22,247	37.4	−5.8
National	Bob Chapman	4,122	6.9	+6.9
Democrats	Mark Beadle	3,909	6.6	+0.4
Total formal votes		59,501	93.1	
Informal votes		4,394	6.9	
Turnout		63,895	94.2	
Two-party-preferred result
Labor	George Gear	31,985	53.8	+0.0
Liberal	Ricky Johnston	27,496	46.2	+0.0
Labor hold		Swing	+0.0	

=== Cowan ===
1987 Australian federal election: Cowan
Party	Candidate	Votes	%	±%
Labor	Carolyn Jakobsen	32,481	52.0	+0.8
Liberal	Paul Filing	27,048	43.3	+0.3
National	Neil Baker	2,973	4.8	+4.8
Total formal votes		62,502	93.6	
Informal votes		4,240	6.4	
Turnout		66,742	94.8	
Two-party-preferred result
Labor	Carolyn Jakobsen	33,241	53.2	−0.8
Liberal	Paul Filing	29,260	46.8	+0.8
Labor hold		Swing	−0.8	

=== Curtin ===
1987 Australian federal election: Curtin
Party	Candidate	Votes	%	±%
Liberal	Allan Rocher	32,912	53.8	−2.4
Labor	Philip Laskaris	20,371	33.3	−2.9
Democrats	Joe Blake	4,967	8.1	+0.5
National	John Gilmour	2,942	4.8	+4.8
Total formal votes		61,192	94.7	
Informal votes		3,397	5.3	
Turnout		64,589	92.2	
Two-party-preferred result
Liberal	Allan Rocher	37,703	61.6	+2.2
Labor	Philip Laskaris	23,486	38.4	−2.2
Liberal hold		Swing	+2.2	

=== Forrest ===
1987 Australian federal election: Forrest
Party	Candidate	Votes	%	±%
Liberal	Geoff Prosser	27,925	44.0	−6.4
Labor	Gerry Thompson	26,764	42.2	−3.5
National	Joe Chambers	5,175	8.2	+8.2
Democrats	David Churches	3,553	5.6	+2.7
Total formal votes		63,417	94.4	
Informal votes		3,747	5.6	
Turnout		67,164	95.3	
Two-party-preferred result
Liberal	Geoff Prosser	33,678	53.1	+0.7
Labor	Gerry Thompson	29,737	46.9	−0.7
Liberal hold		Swing	+0.7	

=== Fremantle ===
1987 Australian federal election: Fremantle
Party	Candidate	Votes	%	±%
Labor	John Dawkins	36,646	61.1	+2.1
Liberal	Jenny van den Hoek	19,487	32.5	−1.4
National	Jack Clarke	3,834	6.4	+6.4
Total formal votes		59,967	91.8	
Informal votes		5,384	8.2	
Turnout		65,351	95.0	
Two-party-preferred result
Labor	John Dawkins	37,628	62.7	−0.2
Liberal	Jenny van den Hoek	22,338	37.3	+0.2
Labor hold		Swing	−0.2	

=== Kalgoorlie ===
1987 Australian federal election: Kalgoorlie
Party	Candidate	Votes	%	±%
Labor	Graeme Campbell	30,841	52.6	+1.3
Liberal	David Johnston	21,850	37.3	−3.6
National	Ron Smales	3,363	5.7	+5.7
Democrats	Frank Chulung	2,593	4.4	+1.4
Total formal votes		58,647	93.8	
Informal votes		3,899	6.2	
Turnout		62,546	88.3	
Two-party-preferred result
Labor	Graeme Campbell	33,223	56.7	+0.7
Liberal	David Johnston	25,420	43.3	−0.7
Labor hold		Swing	+0.7	

=== Moore ===
1987 Australian federal election: Moore
Party	Candidate	Votes	%	±%
Labor	Allen Blanchard	33,022	53.7	−1.4
Liberal	Jim Crawley	23,370	38.0	−6.9
National	Geoff Gill	5,138	8.4	+8.4
Total formal votes		61,530	93.0	
Informal votes		4,610	7.0	
Turnout		66,140	94.5	
Two-party-preferred result
Labor	Allen Blanchard	33,940	55.2	+0.1
Liberal	Jim Crawley	27,587	44.8	−0.1
Labor hold		Swing	+0.1	

=== O'Connor ===
1987 Australian federal election: O'Connor
Party	Candidate	Votes	%	±%
Liberal	Wilson Tuckey	31,329	49.5	−4.1
Labor	Kim Chance	15,865	25.1	−2.8
National	Trevor Flugge	14,632	23.1	+7.4
Democrats	Shyama Peebles	1,503	2.4	−0.4
Total formal votes		63,329	95.3	
Informal votes		3,112	4.7	
Turnout		66,441	94.8	
Two-party-preferred result
Liberal	Wilson Tuckey	44,695	70.6	+1.4
Labor	Kim Chance	18,632	29.4	−1.4
Liberal hold		Swing	+1.4	

=== Perth ===
1987 Australian federal election: Perth
Party	Candidate	Votes	%	±%
Labor	Ric Charlesworth	34,003	55.4	+0.2
Liberal	Bob Campbell	24,494	39.9	−2.3
National	Ted Lisle	2,857	4.7	+4.7
Total formal votes		61,354	92.3	
Informal votes		5,151	7.7	
Turnout		66,505	93.7	
Two-party-preferred result
Labor	Ric Charlesworth	34,819	56.8	+0.5
Liberal	Bob Campbell	26,535	43.2	−0.5
Labor hold		Swing	+0.5	

=== Stirling ===
1987 Australian federal election: Stirling
Party	Candidate	Votes	%	±%
Labor	Ron Edwards	29,342	49.2	−0.5
Liberal	Bill Brown	24,544	41.2	−3.9
Democrats	Harvard Barclay	2,799	4.7	+0.7
National	Malcolm Beveridge	2,345	3.9	+3.9
Independent	Alf Bussell	594	1.0	+1.0
Total formal votes		59,624	92.8	
Informal votes		4,644	7.2	
Turnout		64,268	93.9	
Two-party-preferred result
Labor	Ron Edwards	31,972	53.6	+1.1
Liberal	Bill Brown	27,642	46.4	−1.1
Labor hold		Swing	+1.1	

=== Swan ===
1987 Australian federal election: Swan
Party	Candidate	Votes	%	±%
Labor	Kim Beazley	32,201	54.6	+0.4
Liberal	Harry Klapp	21,555	36.5	−4.2
National	Adelia Bernard	2,750	4.7	+4.7
Independent	Georgina Motion	2,518	4.3	+4.3
Total formal votes		59,024	93.1	
Informal votes		4,348	6.9	
Turnout		63,372	92.7	
Two-party-preferred result
Labor	Kim Beazley	34,220	58.0	+1.0
Liberal	Harry Klapp	24,804	42.0	−1.0
Labor hold		Swing	+1.0	

=== Tangney ===
1987 Australian federal election: Tangney
Party	Candidate	Votes	%	±%
Liberal	Peter Shack	33,520	52.9	−2.4
Labor	Ray Masterton	24,599	38.8	−1.5
Democrats	Richard Jeffreys	3,610	5.7	+1.3
National	William Witham	1,649	2.6	+2.6
Total formal votes		63,378	94.4	
Informal votes		3,738	5.6	
Turnout		67,116	95.4	
Two-party-preferred result
Liberal	Peter Shack	36,405	57.4	−0.4
Labor	Ray Masterton	26,962	42.5	+0.4
Liberal hold		Swing	−0.4	

== See also ==
- Results of the 1987 Australian federal election (House of Representatives)
- Members of the Australian House of Representatives, 1987–1990
