= Post-election pendulum for the 1993 Australian federal election =

The Mackerras pendulum as a way of predicting the outcome of an election contested between two major parties in a Westminster style lower house legislature such as the Australian House of Representatives, which is composed of single-member electorates and which uses a preferential voting system such as a Condorcet method or instant-runoff voting.

The pendulum works by lining up all of the seats held in Parliament for the government, the opposition and the crossbenches according to the percentage point margin they are held by on a two party preferred basis. This is also known as the swing required for the seat to change hands. Given a uniform swing to the opposition or government parties, the number of seats that change hands can be predicted.

Government seats (80)
Marginal
Bass	Tas	Silvia Smith	ALP	0.03
Macquarie	NSW	Maggie Deahm	ALP	0.12
Page	NSW	Harry Woods	ALP	0.13
Canning	WA	George Gear	ALP	0.19
Swan	WA	Kim Beazley	ALP	0.22
Dickson	Qld	Michael Lavarch	ALP	0.26
McMillan	Vic	Barry Cunningham	ALP	0.40
Gilmore	NSW	Peter Knott	ALP	0.45
Dunkley	Vic	Bob Chynoweth	ALP	0.61
McEwen	Vic	Peter Cleeland	ALP	0.69
Macarthur	NSW	Chris Haviland	ALP	1.28
Leichhardt	Qld	Peter Dodd	ALP	1.32
Kingston	SA	Gordon Bilney	ALP	1.45
Moreton	Qld	Garrie Gibson	ALP	1.74
Richmond	NSW	Neville Newell	ALP	1.77
Petrie	Qld	Gary Johns	ALP	2.10
Herbert	Qld	Ted Lindsay	ALP	2.37
Rankin	Qld	David Beddall	ALP	2.67
Capricornia	Qld	Marjorie Henzell	ALP	2.73
Parramatta	NSW	Paul Elliott	ALP	3.24
Paterson	NSW	Bob Horne	ALP	3.30
Brand	WA	Wendy Fatin	ALP	3.70
Makin	SA	Peter Duncan	ALP	3.70
Corinella	Vic	Alan Griffin	ALP	3.74
Lyons	Tas	Dick Adams	ALP	3.78
Calare	NSW	David Simmons	ALP	4.06
Eden-Monaro	NSW	Jim Snow	ALP	4.28
Lowe	NSW	Mary Easson	ALP	5.01
Northern Territory	NT	Warren Snowdon	ALP	5.31
Jagajaga	Vic	Peter Staples	ALP	5.46
Robertson	NSW	Frank Walker	ALP	5.55
Melbourne Ports	Vic	Clyde Holding	ALP	5.85
Brisbane	Qld	Arch Bevis	ALP	5.99
Fairly safe
Perth	WA	Stephen Smith	ALP	6.15
Lilley	Qld	Wayne Swan	ALP	6.22
Hughes	NSW	Robert Tickner	ALP	6.42
Dobell	NSW	Michael Lee	ALP	6.82
Corio	Vic	Gavan O'Connor	ALP	7.19
Bowman	Qld	Con Sciacca	ALP	7.42
Franklin	Tas	Harry Quick	ALP	7.43
Fremantle	WA	John Dawkins	ALP	7.79
Griffith	Qld	Ben Humphreys	ALP	7.98
Forde	Qld	Mary Crawford	ALP	8.57
Barton	NSW	Gary Punch	ALP	9.39
Canberra	ACT	Ros Kelly	ALP	9.56
Kalgoorlie	WA	Graeme Campbell	ALP	9.94
Burke	Vic	Neil O'Keefe	ALP	9.96
Safe
Holt	Vic	Michael Duffy	ALP	10.10
Lindsay	NSW	Ross Free	ALP	10.22
Banks	NSW	Daryl Melham	ALP	10.54
Port Adelaide	SA	Rod Sawford	ALP	12.05
Oxley	Qld	Les Scott	ALP	12.58
Fraser	ACT	John Langmore	ALP	12.81
Hotham	Vic	Simon Crean	ALP	12.99
Greenway	NSW	Russ Gorman	ALP	13.42
Hunter	NSW	Eric Fitzgibbon	ALP	13.92
Denison	Tas	Duncan Kerr	ALP	14.44
Bonython	SA	Neal Blewett	ALP	14.75
Watson	NSW	Leo McLeay	ALP	14.84
Kingsford Smith	NSW	Laurie Brereton	ALP	15.24
Werriwa	NSW	John Kerin	ALP	15.77
Newcastle	NSW	Allan Morris	ALP	16.88
Charlton	NSW	Bob Brown	ALP	17.10
Shortland	NSW	Peter Morris	ALP	17.33
Lalor	Vic	Barry Jones	ALP	17.35
Cunningham	NSW	Stephen Martin	ALP	17.91
Calwell	Vic	Andrew Theophanous	ALP	18.44
Scullin	Vic	Harry Jenkins	ALP	18.62
Maribyrnong	Vic	Alan Griffiths	ALP	18.72
Reid	NSW	Laurie Ferguson	ALP	18.80
Prospect	NSW	Janice Crosio	ALP	19.04
Sydney	NSW	Peter Baldwin	ALP	19.47
Very safe
Fowler	NSW	Ted Grace	ALP	22.00
Blaxland	NSW	Paul Keating	ALP	22.10
Chifley	NSW	Roger Price	ALP	22.57
Grayndler	NSW	Jeannette McHugh	ALP	22.81
Batman	Vic	Brian Howe	ALP	23.43
Melbourne	Vic	Lindsay Tanner	ALP	23.74
Throsby	NSW	Colin Hollis	ALP	24.02
Gellibrand	Vic	Ralph Willis	ALP	25.38

Opposition seats (65)
Marginal
Bendigo	Vic	Bruce Reid	LIB	0.07
Hinkler	Qld	Paul Neville	NAT	0.22
Mallee	Vic	John Forrest	NAT	0.50 v LIB
Parkes	NSW	Michael Cobb	NAT	0.53
Cowan	WA	Richard Evans	LIB	0.93
Deakin	Vic	Ken Aldred	LIB	1.27
Adelaide	SA	Trish Worth	LIB	1.31
Stirling	WA	Eoin Cameron	LIB	1.47
Hindmarsh	SA	Chris Gallus	LIB	1.64
Aston	Vic	Peter Nugent	LIB	1.92
Grey	SA	Barry Wakelin	LIB	2.08
Ballarat	Vic	Michael Ronaldson	LIB	2.20
La Trobe	Vic	Bob Charles	LIB	2.36
Braddon	Tas	Chris Miles	LIB	2.85
Chisholm	Vic	Michael Wooldridge	LIB	2.88
Kennedy	Qld	Bob Katter	NAT	2.88
Isaacs	Vic	Rod Atkinson	LIB	2.98
Bennelong	NSW	John Howard	LIB	3.19
Cook	NSW	Don Dobie	LIB	3.47
Hume	NSW	John Sharp	NAT	3.70
Fadden	Qld	David Jull	LIB	3.77
Dawson	Qld	Ray Braithwaite	NAT	3.84
Cowper	NSW	Garry Nehl	NAT	4.06
Lyne	NSW	Mark Vaile	NAT	4.24
Bruce	Vic	Julian Beale	LIB	5.09
Flinders	Vic	Peter Reith	LIB	5.19
Fisher	Qld	Peter Slipper	LIB	5.36
Wentworth	NSW	John Hewson	LIB	5.46
Goldstein	Vic	David Kemp	LIB	5.54
Sturt	SA	Christopher Pyne	LIB	5.71
Casey	Vic	Bob Halverson	LIB	5.97
Fairly safe
Corangamite	Vic	Stewart McArthur	LIB	6.97
Boothby	SA	Steele Hall	LIB	7.80
Moore	WA	Paul Filing	LIB	8.73
Pearce	WA	Judi Moylan	LIB	8.76
McPherson	Qld	John Bradford	LIB	9.08
Menzies	Vic	Kevin Andrews	LIB	9.23
Wannon	Vic	David Hawker	LIB	9.27
Wide Bay	Qld	Warren Truss	NAT	9.71
Fairfax	Qld	Alex Somlyay	LIB	9.80
Safe
Higgins	Vic	Peter Costello	LIB	10.13
New England	NSW	Ian Sinclair	NAT	10.20
Warringah	NSW	Michael MacKellar	LIB	10.26
Gwydir	NSW	John Anderson	NAT	10.27
Mayo	SA	Alexander Downer	LIB	10.60
Ryan	Qld	John Moore	LIB	10.61
Mackellar	NSW	Jim Carlton	LIB	11.16
Forrest	WA	Geoff Prosser	LIB	11.73
Tangney	WA	Daryl Williams	LIB	11.86
Berowra	NSW	Philip Ruddock	LIB	12.20
Moncrieff	Qld	Kathy Sullivan	LIB	12.41
Indi	Vic	Lou Lieberman	LIB	12.88
Riverina	NSW	Noel Hicks	NAT	12.93
Kooyong	Vic	Andrew Peacock	LIB	14.07
Groom	Qld	Bill Taylor	LIB	14.12
Curtin	WA	Allan Rocher	LIB	15.22
Barker	SA	Ian McLachlan	LIB	15.97
Gippsland	Vic	Peter McGauran	NAT	16.30
Wakefield	SA	Neil Andrew	LIB	16.98
Farrer	NSW	Tim Fischer	NAT	17.43
Maranoa	Qld	Bruce Scott	NAT	18.13
Mitchell	NSW	Alan Cadman	LIB	18.67
Very safe
Murray	Vic	Bruce Lloyd	NAT	20.41
Bradfield	NSW	David Connolly	LIB	23.04
O'Connor	WA	Wilson Tuckey	LIB	24.02
Crossbench seats (2)
North Sydney	NSW	Ted Mack	IND	1.84 v LIB
Wills	Vic	Phil Cleary	IND	2.42 v ALP
