= Electoral results for the Division of Brand =

Australian division election results

This is a list of electoral results for the Division of Brand in Australian federal elections from the division's creation in 1984 until the present.

== Members ==
Member	Party	Term
Wendy Fatin	Labor	1984–1996
Kim Beazley	Labor	1996–2007
Gary Gray	Labor	2007–2016
Madeleine King	Labor	2016–present

== Election results ==
=== Elections in the 2020s ===
==== 2025 ====
2025 Australian federal election: Brand
Party	Candidate	Votes	%	±%
Greens	Jody Freeman			
One Nation	Stephen Box			
Labor	Madeleine King			
Legalise Cannabis	Jim Matters			
Liberal	Claire Moody			
Total formal votes				
Informal votes				
Turnout				

==== 2022 ====
2022 Australian federal election: Brand
Party	Candidate	Votes	%	±%
Labor	Madeleine King	48,031	50.20	+9.82
Liberal	Peter Hudson	21,056	22.01	−7.83
Greens	Heather Lonsdale	10,900	11.39	+0.29
One Nation	Jake Taylor	5,139	5.37	−3.10
United Australia	David Pike	2,711	2.83	−0.06
Western Australia	Michael O'Loghlen	2,592	2.71	+0.01
Christians	Jayne Crichton	2,090	2.18	−0.89
Great Australian	Andrew Gleeson	1,490	1.56	+1.56
Liberal Democrats	Alison Marshall	1,074	1.12	+1.12
Federation	Malcolm Heffernan	598	0.62	+0.62
Total formal votes		95,681	93.59	−0.15
Informal votes		6,551	6.41	+0.15
Turnout		102,232	86.56	−1.90
Two-party-preferred result
Labor	Madeleine King	63,829	66.71	+10.05
Liberal	Peter Hudson	31,852	33.29	−10.05
Labor hold		Swing	+10.05	

Alluvial diagram for preference flows in the seat of Brand in the 2022 federal election. The winning candidate got over 50% of first preference votes, so this alluvial diagram is indicative only, and preference flows were not used to determine the final result. The preference flows were used to determine the two-candidate-preferred.

=== Elections in the 2010s ===
==== 2019 ====
2019 Australian federal election: Brand
Party	Candidate	Votes	%	±%
Labor	Madeleine King	35,875	40.38	−7.10
Liberal	Jack Pleiter	26,510	29.84	−1.78
Greens	Jody Freeman	9,863	11.10	−0.58
One Nation	Travis Carter	7,524	8.47	+8.47
Christians	Janine Vander Ven	2,726	3.07	−0.39
United Australia	Trevor Jones	2,570	2.89	+2.89
Western Australia	Blake Phelan	2,397	2.70	+2.70
Conservative National	Karen-Lee Mills	1,376	1.55	+1.55
Total formal votes		88,841	93.74	−2.04
Informal votes		5,928	6.26	+2.04
Turnout		94,769	88.57	+1.53
Two-party-preferred result
Labor	Madeleine King	50,333	56.66	−4.77
Liberal	Jack Pleiter	38,508	43.34	+4.77
Labor hold		Swing	−4.77	

==== 2016 ====
2016 Australian federal election: Brand
Party	Candidate	Votes	%	±%
Labor	Madeleine King	38,803	47.48	+6.39
Liberal	Craig Buchanan	25,843	31.62	−6.12
Greens	Dawn Jecks	9,542	11.68	+4.25
Rise Up Australia	Philip Scott	4,704	5.76	+5.04
Christians	Robert Burdett	2,826	3.46	+1.43
Total formal votes		81,718	95.78	+1.59
Informal votes		3,602	4.22	−1.59
Turnout		85,320	87.04	+1.28
Two-party-preferred result
Labor	Madeleine King	50,202	61.43	+7.72
Liberal	Craig Buchanan	31,516	38.57	−7.72
Labor hold		Swing	+7.72	

==== 2013 ====
2013 Australian federal election: Brand
Party	Candidate	Votes	%	±%
Labor	Gary Gray	35,093	40.39	−0.41
Liberal	Donna Gordin	33,634	38.71	−0.67
Palmer United	Craig Lawrence	6,518	7.50	+7.50
Greens	Dawn Jecks	6,343	7.30	−7.44
Family First	Andrew Newhouse	2,079	2.39	−0.42
Christians	Bob Burdett	1,685	1.94	+1.94
Rise Up Australia	Gabrielle Iriks	646	0.74	+0.74
Democrats	Paul Young	598	0.69	+0.69
Citizens Electoral Council	Mick Le-Cocq	280	0.32	+0.32
Total formal votes		86,876	94.29	−0.48
Informal votes		5,257	5.71	+0.48
Turnout		92,133	92.29	−1.07
Two-party-preferred result
Labor	Gary Gray	45,940	52.88	−0.45
Liberal	Donna Gordin	40,936	47.12	+0.45
Labor hold		Swing	−0.45	

==== 2010 ====
2010 Australian federal election: Brand
Party	Candidate	Votes	%	±%
Labor	Gary Gray	31,832	40.80	−5.53
Liberal	Donna Gordin	30,731	39.38	+1.28
Greens	Dawn Jecks	11,504	14.74	+5.88
Family First	Andrew Newhouse	2,190	2.81	+1.03
Christian Democrats	Robert Burdett	1,771	2.27	−0.30
Total formal votes		78,028	94.77	−1.36
Informal votes		4,304	5.23	+1.36
Turnout		82,332	93.34	+0.07
Two-party-preferred result
Labor	Gary Gray	41,610	53.33	−2.65
Liberal	Donna Gordin	36,418	46.67	+2.65
Labor hold		Swing	−2.65	

=== Elections in the 2000s ===
==== 2007 ====
2007 Australian federal election: Brand
Party	Candidate	Votes	%	±%
Labor	Gary Gray	38,131	46.15	−0.94
Liberal	Phil Edman	31,882	38.58	−1.31
Greens	Dawn Jecks	7,110	8.60	+3.77
Christian Democrats	Brent Tremain	2,061	2.49	+0.36
Family First	Andrew Newhouse	1,482	1.79	+1.79
One Nation	Robin Scott	1,321	1.60	−1.16
Liberty & Democracy	Huw Grossmith	350	0.42	+0.42
Citizens Electoral Council	Rob Totten	295	0.36	−0.64
Total formal votes		82,632	96.10	+1.90
Informal votes		3,354	3.90	−1.90
Turnout		85,986	93.50	+0.09
Two-party-preferred result
Labor	Gary Gray	45,959	55.62	+0.97
Liberal	Phil Edman	36,673	44.38	−0.97
Labor hold		Swing	+0.97	

==== 2004 ====
2004 Australian federal election: Brand
Party	Candidate	Votes	%	±%
Labor	Kim Beazley	34,892	47.09	−4.62
Liberal	Phil Edman	29,563	39.89	+15.92
Greens	Jean Jenkins	3,578	4.83	+1.35
One Nation	Garth Stockden	2,045	2.76	−3.38
Christian Democrats	Rajesh Vettoor	1,581	2.13	+1.26
Independent	Gerard Kettle	1,084	1.46	+1.46
Citizens Electoral Council	Rob Totten	742	1.00	+0.77
Democrats	John Partridge	619	0.84	−1.55
Total formal votes		74,104	94.20	−1.49
Informal votes		4,566	5.80	+1.49
Turnout		78,670	93.41	−1.79
Two-party-preferred result
Labor	Kim Beazley	40,499	54.65	−5.40
Liberal	Phil Edman	33,605	45.35	+5.40
Labor hold		Swing	−5.40	

==== 2001 ====
2001 Australian federal election: Brand
Party	Candidate	Votes	%	±%
Labor	Kim Beazley	36,917	51.71	−1.38
Liberal	Margaret Thomas	17,110	23.97	−2.47
Liberals for Forests	Keith Woollard	8,006	11.21	+11.21
One Nation	Steve Robbie	4,380	6.14	−5.82
Greens	Kate Davis	2,486	3.48	+0.58
Democrats	Paul Hubbard	1,706	2.39	−2.47
Christian Democrats	Terry Iredale	621	0.87	+0.29
Citizens Electoral Council	Brian McCarthy	164	0.23	+0.23
Total formal votes		71,390	95.69	+1.17
Informal votes		3,214	4.31	−1.17
Turnout		74,604	95.98	
Two-party-preferred result
Labor	Kim Beazley	42,869	60.05	−3.32
Liberal	Margaret Thomas	28,521	39.95	+3.32
Labor hold		Swing	−3.32	

=== Elections in the 1990s ===
==== 1998 ====
1998 Australian federal election: Brand
Party	Candidate	Votes	%	±%
Labor	Kim Beazley	36,391	52.00	+7.65
Liberal	Rick Palmer	19,413	27.74	−14.01
One Nation	Lee Dawson	8,308	11.87	+11.87
Greens	Nick Dunlop	2,012	2.88	−1.62
Democrats	Collin Mullane	1,630	2.33	−1.44
Christian Democrats	Graham Lawn	402	0.57	+0.57
Independent	Kate Dorrington	399	0.57	+0.57
Natural Law	Anne Leishman	343	0.49	+0.49
Independent	Paul Roth	310	0.44	+0.44
Independent	Kent Reynolds	308	0.44	+0.44
Australia First	Carolyn Gent	296	0.42	+0.42
Abolish Child Support	Ron Higgins	167	0.24	+0.24
Total formal votes		69,979	94.54	−2.20
Informal votes		4,043	5.46	+2.20
Turnout		74,022	95.35	+0.15
Two-party-preferred result
Labor	Kim Beazley	43,587	62.29	+11.44
Liberal	Rick Palmer	26,392	37.71	−11.44
Labor hold		Swing	+11.44	

==== 1996 ====
1996 Australian federal election: Brand
Party	Candidate	Votes	%	±%
Labor	Kim Beazley	37,165	43.86	−4.55
Liberal	Penny Hearne	36,060	42.56	+1.11
Greens	Bob Goodale	3,577	4.22	−0.71
Democrats	Mal McKercher	2,969	3.50	+1.02
Independent	Alan Gent	2,016	2.38	+2.38
Against Further Immigration	Phil Rebe	943	1.11	+1.11
National	Malcolm Walton	877	1.04	+1.04
Independent	Leone Anderson	452	0.53	+0.53
Independent	Brian McCarthy	373	0.44	+0.44
Independent	Clive Galletly	301	0.36	+0.36
Total formal votes		84,733	96.64	−0.89
Informal votes		2,943	3.36	+0.89
Turnout		87,676	95.20	−0.75
Two-party-preferred result
Labor	Kim Beazley	42,379	50.23	−3.47
Liberal	Penny Hearne	41,992	49.77	+3.47
Labor hold		Swing	−3.47	

==== 1993 ====
1993 Australian federal election: Brand
Party	Candidate	Votes	%	±%
Labor	Wendy Fatin	36,413	48.42	+5.58
Liberal	Adrian Fawcett	31,174	41.45	+4.18
Greens	Andrea Evans	3,707	4.93	−1.64
Democrats	Ray Tilbury	1,865	2.48	−6.29
Call to Australia	Paul Cant	1,179	1.57	+1.57
Independent	Norm Dicks	613	0.82	+0.82
Natural Law	Jacqui Robinson	259	0.34	+0.34
Total formal votes		75,210	97.53	+1.63
Informal votes		1,903	2.47	−1.63
Turnout		77,113	95.95	
Two-party-preferred result
Labor	Wendy Fatin	40,366	53.70	−1.49
Liberal	Adrian Fawcett	34,805	46.30	+1.49
Labor hold		Swing	−1.49	

==== 1990 ====
1990 Australian federal election: Brand
Party	Candidate	Votes	%	±%
Labor	Wendy Fatin	27,303	42.8	−11.5
Liberal	Maureen Healy	23,757	37.3	+3.7
Democrats	Jan Wallace	5,590	8.8	+1.7
Greens	Luna Gardiner	4,189	6.6	+6.6
National	Errol Tuxworth	1,200	1.9	−3.1
Grey Power	Blanche Pledge	841	1.3	+1.3
Independent	Keith Evans	662	1.0	+1.0
Independent	Chris Galletly	200	0.3	+0.3
Total formal votes		63,742	95.9	
Informal votes		2,726	4.1	
Turnout		66,468	95.2	
Two-party-preferred result
Labor	Wendy Fatin	35,130	55.2	−3.6
Liberal	Maureen Healy	28,528	44.8	+3.6
Labor hold		Swing	−3.6	

=== Elections in the 1980s ===
==== 1987 ====
1987 Australian federal election: Brand
Party	Candidate	Votes	%	±%
Labor	Wendy Fatin	32,135	52.2	−1.3
Liberal	Bernie Masters	21,985	35.7	−7.4
Democrats	John Willis	4,368	7.1	+7.1
National	Peter Bass	3,091	5.0	+5.0
Total formal votes		61,579	92.3	
Informal votes		5,112	7.7	
Turnout		66,691	95.1	
Two-party-preferred result
Labor	Wendy Fatin	34,906	56.7	+1.2
Liberal	Bernie Masters	26,669	43.3	−1.2
Labor hold		Swing	+1.2	

==== 1984 ====
1984 Australian federal election: Brand
Party	Candidate	Votes	%	±%
Labor	Wendy Fatin	29,321	53.5	−2.1
Liberal	Christopher Boyle	23,633	43.1	+3.5
Independent	Thomas Renfrey	1,820	3.3	+3.3
Total formal votes		54,774	90.7	
Informal votes		5,592	9.3	
Turnout		60,366	94.4	
Two-party-preferred result
Labor	Wendy Fatin	30,420	55.5	−1.7
Liberal	Christopher Boyle	24,349	44.5	+1.7
Labor notional hold		Swing	−1.7	
