= 1993 Australian House of Representatives election =

1993 Australian federal election
- 13 March 1993 (Note: The election in the seat of Dickson was deferred to 17 April 1993.)

All 147 seats in the House of Representatives 74 seats were needed for a majority in the House 40 (of the 76) seats in the Senate
- Registered: 11,384,638 ▲6.12%
- Turnout: 10,900,861 (95.75%) (▲0.44 pp)
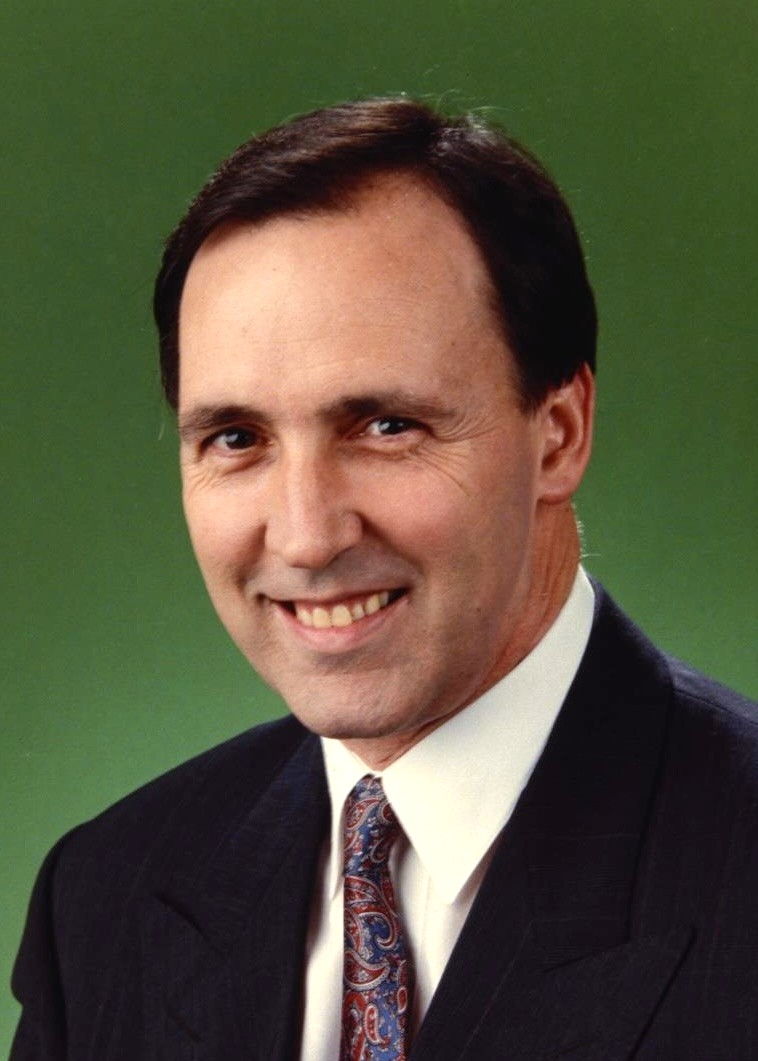

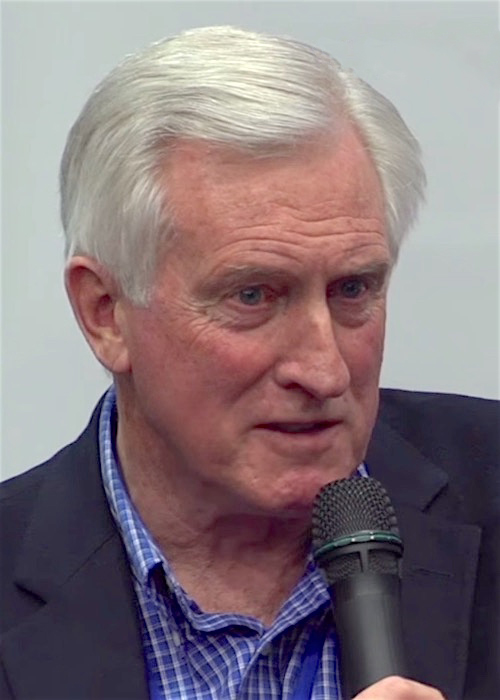
	First party	Second party
Leader	Paul Keating	John Hewson
Party	Labor	Liberal–National Coalition
Leader since	19 December 1991	3 April 1990
Leader's seat	Blaxland (NSW)	Wentworth (NSW)
Last election	78 seats	69 seats
Seats won	80 seats	65 seats
Seat change	▲2	▼4
First preference vote	4,751,390	4,681,822
Percentage	44.92%	44.27%
Swing	▲5.49%	▲0.81%
TPP	51.44%	48.56%
TPP swing	▲1.54%	▼1.54%
- Results by division for the House of Representatives, shaded by winning party's margin of victory.
Prime Minister before election
Paul Keating
Labor
Subsequent Prime Minister
Paul Keating
Labor

The following tables show results for the Australian House of Representatives at the 1993 federal election held on 13 March 1993.

== Australia ==
House of Reps (IRV) – 1993–36 – Turnout 95.75% (CV) — Informal 2.97%
Party	Votes	%	Swing	Seats	Change
Labor	4,751,390	44.92	+5.49	80	▲2
Liberal	3,888,579	36.77	+2.01	49	▼6
National	758,036	7.17	–1.25	16	▲2
Country Liberal	35,207	0.33	+0.05	0	Steady
Liberal–National Coalition	4,681,822	44.27	+0.81	65	▼4
Democrats	397,060	3.75	–7.51		
Independents (Note: The elected independents were Ted Mack (NSW) and Phil Cleary (Victoria).)	329,235	3.11	+0.35	2	▲1
Greens (Note: The Australian Greens were founded in 1992, but not all state and territory organisations immediately affiliated to the new federal party. The Greens total includes unaffiliated local groups in New South Wales (Note: The Greens total in New South Wales includes the local groups for Lowe, Page, Reid, Robertson and Wentworth.) (11,685), Queensland Greens (58,502), Greens Western Australia (55,907), Greens South Australia (1,496), Tasmanian Greens (24,319), and ACT Green Democratic Alliance (3,109).)	196,702	1.85	+0.48		
Natural Law	78,577	0.74	+0.74		
Confederate Action	60,213	0.57	+0.57		
Call to Australia	49,467	0.47	–0.50		
Independent EFF	9,954	0.09	+0.09		
Rex Connor Labor	7,083	0.07	–0.01		
Citizens Electoral Council	4,198	0.04	+0.04		
Indigenous Peoples	4,069	0.04	+0.04		
Against Further Immigration	3,587	0.03	+0.03		
Grey Power	1,759	0.02	–0.19		
Abolish Self Government	1,663	0.02	+0.02		
Total	10,576,779			147	▼1
Two-party-preferred vote
Labor	5,436,421	51.44	+1.54	80	▲2
Liberal–National Coalition	5,133,033	48.56	–1.54	65	▼4
Invalid/blank votes	324,082	2.97			
Turnout	10,900,861	95.75			
Registered voters	11,384,638				
Source: Federal Elections 1993

== States ==
=== New South Wales ===
1993 Australian federal election (New South Wales)
- 13 March 1993

All 50 New South Wales seats in the Australian House of Representatives and 6 seats in the Australian Senate

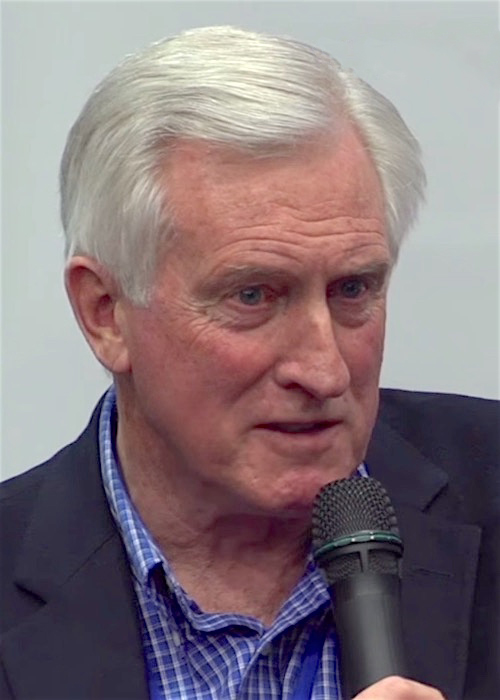
	First party	Second party
Leader	Paul Keating	John Hewson
Party	Labor	Liberal/National coalition
Last election	30 seats	20 seats
Seats won	33 seats	16 seats
Seat change	▲3	▼4
Popular vote	1,714,512	1,473,482
Percentage	48.3%	41.6%
Swing	▲7.1	▲1.2
TPP	54.68%	45.32%
TPP swing	▲2.74	▼2.74

Turnout 96.0% (CV) — Informal 3.1%
Party	Votes	%	Swing	Seats	Change
Liberal	1,127,291	31.80	-0.96	8	▼4
National	346,191	9.76	-0.77	8	Steady
Liberal/National Coalition	1,473,482	41.56	-1.73	16	▼4
Labor	1,714,502	48.36	+7.20	33	▲3
Independents	134,344	3.79	-1.40	1	Steady
Democrats	100,539	2.84	-7.37		
Greens	50,052	1.41	+0.04		
Natural Law	23,385	0.66			
Call to Australia	21,764	0.61	-0.04		
Independent EFF	9,402	0.27			
Confederate Action	8,524	0.24			
Rex Connor Labor	7,083	0.20	-0.05		
AAFI	1,732	0.05			
Citizens Electoral Council	0,439	0.01			
Total	3,354,671			50	▼1
Two-party-preferred vote
Labor	1,898,256	54.68	+2.74		▲3
Liberal/National Coalition	1,573,030	45.32	–2.74		▼4
Invalid/blank votes	113,664	3.1			
Turnout	3,662,142	96.0			
Registered voters	3,814,932				
Source: Federal Elections 1993

=== Victoria ===
1993 Australian federal election (Victoria)
- 13 March 1993

All 38 Victorian seats in the Australian House of Representatives and 6 seats in the Australian Senate

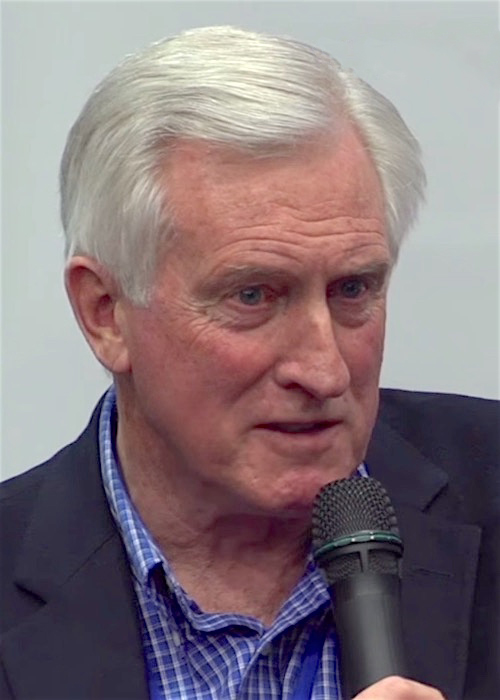
	First party	Second party
Leader	Paul Keating	John Hewson
Party	Labor	Liberal/National coalition
Last election	14 seats	24
Seats won	17 seats	20 seats
Seat change	▲3	▼4
Popular vote	1,273,974	1,240,435
Percentage	45.2%	45.2%
Swing	▲9.4	▼0.5
TPP	51.80%	48.20%
TPP swing	▲4.34	▼4.34

Turnout 96.3% (CV) — Informal 2.8%
Party	Votes	%	Swing	Seats	Change
Liberal	1,102,965	40.21	+0.53	17	▼4
National	137,470	5.01	−0.99	3	Steady
Liberal/National Coalition	1,240,435	45.22	−0.46	20	▼4
Labor	1,273,974	46.45	+9.38	17	▲3
Democrats	101,185	3.69	−8.74		
Independents	75,652	2.76		1	Steady
Natural Law	31,529	1.15			
Call to Australia	13,289	0.48			
Greens	3,317	0.12			
AAFI	1,855	0.07			
Citizens Electoral Council	1,027	0.04			
Independent EFF	552	0.02			
Total	2,742,815			38	
Two-party-preferred vote
Labor	1,419,835	51.80	+4.34		▲3
Liberal/National Coalition	1,320,898	48.20	−4.34		▼4
Invalid/blank votes	79,811	2.8			
Turnout	2,822,626	96.3			
Registered voters	2,932,640				
Source: Federal Elections 1993

=== Queensland ===
1993 Australian federal election (Queensland)
- 13 March 1993

All 25 Queensland seats in the Australian House of Representatives and 6 seats in the Australian Senate
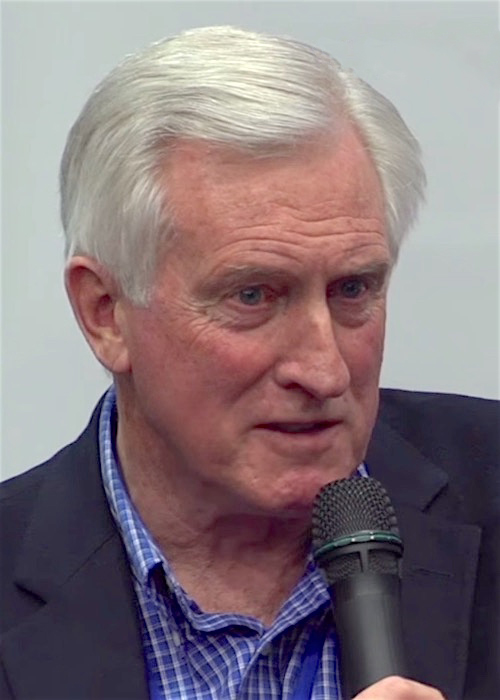

	First party	Second party
Leader	John Hewson	Paul Keating
Party	Liberal/National coalition	Labor
Last election	9 seats	15
Seats won	12 seats	13 seats
Seat change	▲3	▼2
Popular vote	840,378	739,862
Percentage	46.0%	40.5%
Swing	▲0.7	▼1.1
TPP	51.57%	48.43%
TPP swing	▲0.89	▼0.89

Turnout 96.3% (CV) — Informal 2.8%
Party	Votes	%	Swing	Seats	Change
Liberal	571,226	31.26	2.75	7	▲1
National	269,152	14.73	-2.03	5	▲2
Liberal/National Coalition	840,378	45.99	0.72	12	▲3
Labor	739,862	40.49	-1.10	13	▼2
Democrats	74,278	4.06	-7.53		
Greens	58,502	3.20	2.60		
Independent	52,391	2.87	2.18		
Confederate Action	51,565	2.82	0.00		
Indigenous Peoples	4,069	0.22	0.00		
Natural Law	3,547	0.19	0.00		
Citizens Electoral Council	2,732	0.15	0.00		
Total	1,827,324			25	▲1
Two-party-preferred vote
Labor	884,426	48.43	-0.89	13	▼2
Liberal/National Coalition	941,709	51.57	0.89	12	▲3
Invalid/blank votes	49,135	2.62	0.39		
Turnout	1,876,459	95.17			
Registered voters	1,971,729				
Source: Federal Elections 1993

=== Western Australia ===
1993 Australian federal election (Western Australia)
- 13 March 1993

All 14 Western Australia seats in the Australian House of Representatives and 6 seats in the Australian Senate
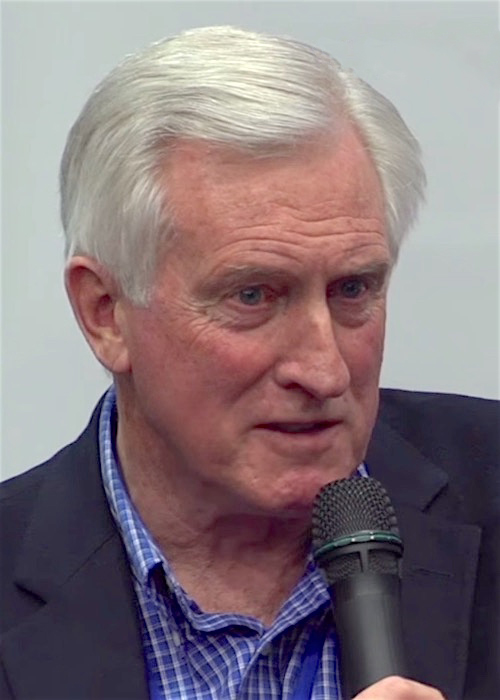

	First party	Second party
Leader	John Hewson	Paul Keating
Party	Liberal/National coalition	Labor
Last election	6 seats	8 seats
Seats won	8 seats	6 seats
Seat change	▲2	▼2
Popular vote	477,088	381,143
Percentage	49.3%	39.4%
Swing	▲2.93	▲4.0
TPP	53.98%	46.02%
TPP swing	▲1.11	▼1.11

Turnout 96.3% (CV) — Informal 2.8%
Party	Votes	%	Swing	Seats	Change
Liberal	474,743	49.01	5.10	8	▲2
National	2,345	0.24	-2.18		Steady
Liberal/National Coalition	477,088	49.26	2.93	8	▲2
Labor	381,143	39.35	4.01	6	▼2
Greens	55,907	5.77	-1.74		
Democrats	31,791	3.28	-5.12		
Independents	12,160	1.26	0.62		
Call to Australia	5,409	0.56	0.56		
Natural Law	5,095	0.53	0.43		
Total	968,593			14	
Two-party-preferred vote
Liberal/National Coalition	522,580	53.98	1.11	8	▲2
Labor	445,462	46.02	-1.11	6	▼2
Invalid/blank votes	24,992	2.52	-1.19		
Turnout	993,585	95.63			
Registered voters	1,038,968				
Source: Federal Elections 1993

=== South Australia ===
1993 Australian federal election (South Australia)
- 13 March 1993

All 12 South Australia seats in the Australian House of Representatives and 6 seats in the Australian Senate
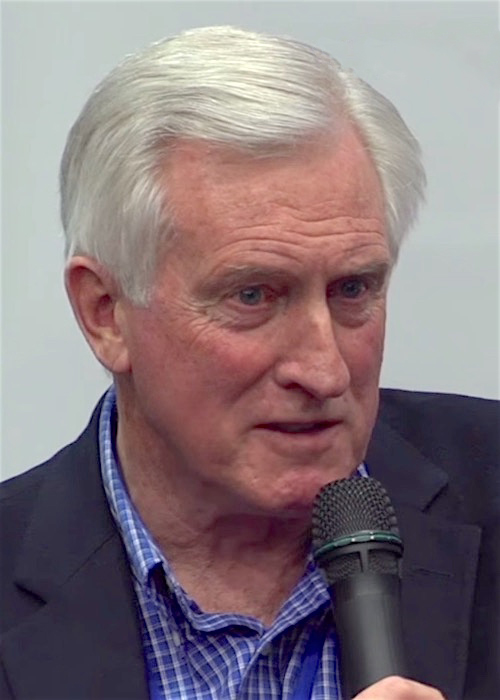

	First party	Second party
Leader	John Hewson	Paul Keating
Party	Liberal/National coalition	Labor
Last election	6 seats	7 seats
Seats won	8 seats	4 seats
Seat change	▲2	▼3
Popular vote	424,565	358,707
Percentage	46.0%	38.8%
Swing	▲3.3	▲0.9
TPP	52.67%	47.33%
TPP swing	▲1.27	▼1.27

Turnout 94.9% (CV) — Informal 4.1%
Party	Votes	%	Swing	Seats	Change
Liberal	421,687	45.65	3.00	8	▲2
National	2,878	0.31	0.31		Steady
Liberal/National Coalition	424,565	45.96	3.31	8	▲2
Labor	358,707	38.84	0.89	4	▼3
Democrats	71,981	7.79	-7.37		
Independents	43,317	4.69	3.39		
Natural Law	13,592	1.47			
Call to Australia	8,134	0.88			
Grey Power	1,759	0.19			
Greens	1,496	0.16	-0.05		
Confederate Action	124	0.01			
Total	923,645			12	
Two-party-preferred vote
Liberal/National Coalition	485,892	52.67	1.27	8	▲2
Labor	436,650	47.33	-1.27	4	▼3
Invalid/blank votes	39,088	4.06	+0.38		
Turnout	962,763	94.91			
Registered voters	1,014,400				
Source: Federal Elections 1993

=== Tasmania ===
1993 Australian federal election (Tasmania)
- 13 March 1993

All 5 Tasmanian seats in the Australian House of Representatives and 6 seats in the Australian Senate

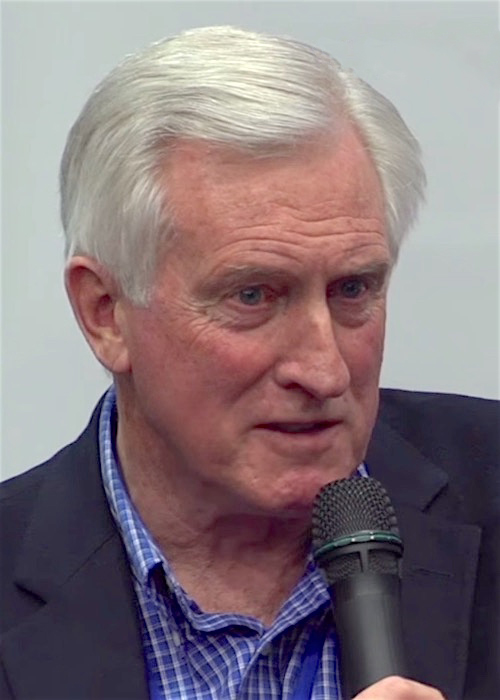
	First party	Second party
Leader	Paul Keating	John Hewson
Party	Labor	Liberal/National coalition
Last election	1 seat	4 seats
Seats won	4 seats	1 seat
Seat change	▲3	▼3
Popular vote	143,621	129,132
Percentage	46.8%	42.0%
Swing	▲7.0	▼6.6
TPP	54.65%	45.35%
TPP swing	▲6.75	▼6.75

Turnout 96.3% (CV) — Informal 2.7%
Party	Votes	%	Swing	Seats	Change
Labor	143,621	46.76	+7.02	4	▲3
Liberal	129,132	42.04	−6.58	1	▼3
Greens	24,319	7.92	+5.72		
Democrats	7,653	2.49	−6.10		
Independents	1,544	0.50	−0.25		
Call to Australia	871	0.28			
Total	307,140			5	
Two-party-preferred vote
Labor	167,780	54.65	+6.75	4	▲3
Liberal	139,239	45.35	−6.75	1	▼3
Invalid/blank votes	8,634	2.73	−0.53		
Turnout	315,774	96.30			
Registered voters	327,919				
Source: Federal Elections 1993

|abc

== Territories ==
=== Australian Capital Territory ===
1993 Australian federal election (Australian Capital Territory)
- 13 March 1993

Both Australian Capital Territory seats in the Australian House of Representatives and both seats in the Australian Senate

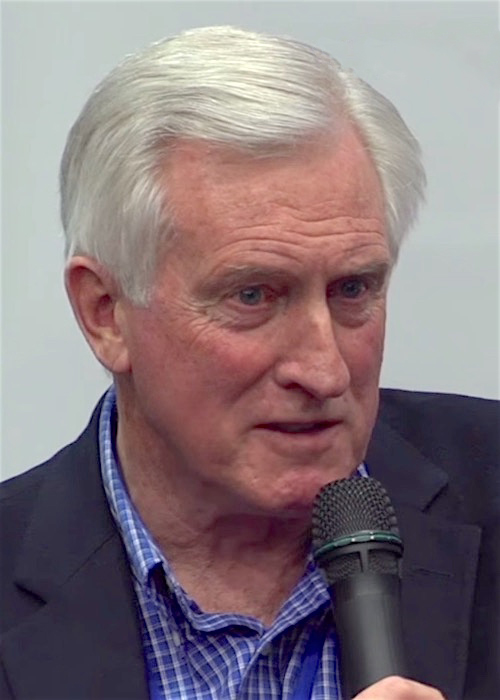
	First party	Second party
Leader	Paul Keating	John Hewson
Party	Labor	Coalition
Last election	2 seats	0 seats
Seats won	2	0
Seat change	Steady	Steady
Popular vote	99,993	61,535
Percentage	53.34%	34.19%
Swing	▲8.46	▼0.64
TPP	61.2%	38.8%
TPP swing	▲2.6	▼2.6

Turnout 96.7% (CV) — Informal 3.4%
Party	Votes	%	Swing	Seats	Change
Labor	95,993	53.34	+8.46	2	Steady
Liberal	61,535	34.19	–0.64		Steady
Democrats	10,355	5.75	–8.67		
Green Democratic	3,109	1.73	–2.06		
Abolish Self Govt	1,663	0.92			
Natural Law	1,429	0.79			
Independent	5,885	3.27	+2.68		
Total	179,969			2	
Two-party-preferred vote
Labor	110,055	61.2	+2.6	2	Steady
Liberal	69,796	38.8	–2.6	0	Steady
Invalid/blank votes	6,240	3.35	+0.40		
Turnout	186,209	96.74			
Registered voters	192,487				
Source: Federal Elections 1993

=== Northern Territory ===
1993 Australian federal election (Northern Territory)
- 13 March 1993

The one Northern Territory seat in the Australian House of Representatives and both seats in the Australian Senate

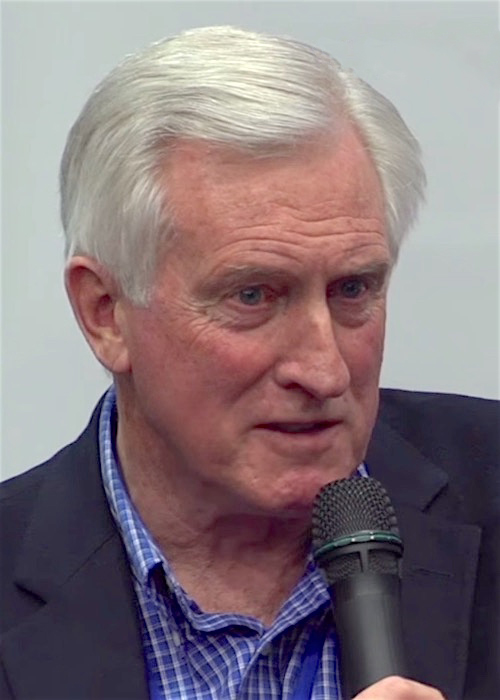
	First party	Second party
Leader	Paul Keating	John Hewson
Party	Labor	Coalition
Last election	1 seat	0 seats
Seats won	1	0
Seat change	Steady	Steady
Popular vote	43,578	35,207
Percentage	55.31%	44.69%
Swing	▲5.35	▼9.5
TPP	55.3%	44.7%
TPP swing	▲0.3	▼0.3

1993 Australian federal election: Northern Territory
Party	Candidate	Votes	%	±%
Labor	Warren Snowdon	43,578	55.31	+5.35
Country Liberal	Arthur Palmer	35,207	44.69	+4.15
Total formal votes		78,785	96.90	+0.28
Informal votes		2,518	3.10	−0.28
Turnout		81,303	88.79	
Labor hold		Swing	+0.29	

== See also ==
- Post-election pendulum for the 1993 Australian federal election
- Results of the 1993 Australian federal election (Senate)
- Members of the Australian House of Representatives, 1993–1996
