= Luke Simpkins =

Australian politician

Member of the Australian Parliament for Cowan
- In office 24 November 2007 – 2 July 2016
- Preceded by: Graham Edwards
- Succeeded by: Anne Aly

Personal details
- Born: Luke Xavier Linton Simpkins; 8 June 1964 (age 61) Sydney, New South Wales
- Party: Liberal (until 2017); Conservatives (2017–2019); Independent (from 2019)
- Website: www.lukesimpkinsmp.com

Military service
- Branch/service: Australian Army
- Years of service: 1988–2002
- Rank: Major
- Unit: Royal Australian Corps of Military Police

Luke Xavier Linton Simpkins (born 8 June 1964) is an Australian former politician who served as a member of the House of Representatives from 2007 to 2016. He represented the Division of Cowan in Western Australia for the Liberal Party.

== Early life ==
Simpkins was born in Sydney, and attended Sydney Boys High School from 1976–1981. He has a Bachelor of Arts from the University of New South Wales and a Graduate Certificate in Security Management from Edith Cowan University. He was a member of the Australian Federal Police from 1986 to 1987, an army officer from 1988 to 2002, a security consultant 2003 to 2004 and 2007, and a ministerial adviser from 2005 to 2006. His army service included a stint as a cadet at the Royal Military College, Duntroon from 1988 to 1989, and as an officer in the Royal Australian Corps of Military Police from 1989 to 2002; when he resigned in 2002, he was a commissioned officer with the rank of major. Simpkins is also a former Australian and State representative in the sport of rowing, having won two national and six state championships.

== Political history ==
Simpkins first attempted to enter politics in 2004, contesting the seat of Cowan at the 2004 federal election for the Liberal Party against veteran Labor incumbent Graham Edwards. He was defeated by Edwards, but received an unexpectedly strong vote, receiving an 8.2% primary vote swing towards him, with the result being unclear for several days.

Edwards retired at the 2007 election, and Simpkins won the seat against new Labor candidate Liz Prime with a 2.5% swing, one of only four pro-Coalition swings in Australia and one of only two new House seats won by the Liberal Party. He was re-elected with a 4.75% swing against former Lord Mayor of Perth Chas Hopkins at the 2010 election, and again with a slight swing against at the 2013 election.

On 6 February 2015 Simpkins announced that he would move a motion, at a meeting of the party room, for a spill of the federal Liberal Party's leadership positions (the motion was seconded by fellow WA Liberal Don Randall). Simpkins stated that such a motion would give Liberal members of parliament and senators the opportunity to either endorse the Prime Minister, Tony Abbott or "seek a new direction." The meeting was held on 9 February 2015 and the spill motion was defeated 61 votes to 39.

At the 2016 election, Simpkins suffered a 5.20% swing against him and was defeated by Labor candidate Anne Aly. During the election campaign, Liberal Justice Minister Michael Keenan was accused of starting a smear campaign against Aly. Simpkins joined in the campaign targeting Aly for her previous work in counter-terrorism, despite having written to her, in 2015 before she was a Labor candidate, to convey his admiration for her work including the "content of your media interviews and approach to the threat of radicalisation".

=== Political views ===
Simpkins is an outspoken social conservative. He was one of six Liberal MPs (including fellow West Australian MPs Wilson Tuckey, Dennis Jensen and the late Don Randall as well as Sophie Mirabella and the late Alby Schultz) to leave the house in protest to the apology to the Stolen Generations. Simpkins declared that he worried "that it could lock in negativity about the future", that indigenous people were no longer denied employment opportunities, and that he would "again back children being taken in this situation".

He has attacked halal food, declaring in 2011 that "by having Australians unwittingly eating Halal food, then we are all one step down the path of conversion, and that is a step we should only make with full knowledge and not be imposed upon us unknowingly." His position was criticised by Labor MP Chris Bowen.

Simpkins has supported banning the burqa in Australia. He has also supported sleep deprivation torture as a means of gaining information, and he opposes same-sex marriage.

== Later activities ==
In 2017, after his defeat, Simpkins joined Cory Bernardi's Australian Conservatives party.

Parliament of Australia
Preceded by Graham Edwards	Member for Cowan; 2007–2016	Succeeded by Anne Aly
