= Graham Edwards (politician) =

Australian politician

The Honourable Graham Edwards AM
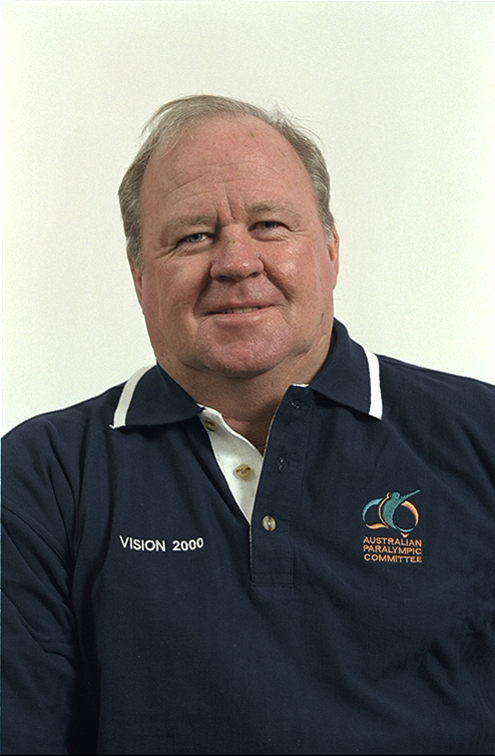

Member of the Australian Parliament for Cowan
- In office 3 October 1998 – 17 October 2007
- Preceded by: Richard Evans
- Succeeded by: Luke Simpkins

Leader of the Opposition in the Legislative Council of Western Australia
- In office 17 February 1993 – 30 November 1993
- Leader: Carmen Lawrence

Minister for Racing and Gaming, Sport and Recreation, and Youth of Western Australia
- In office 16 March 1987 – 19 February 1990
- Premier: Brian Burke; Peter Dowding

Minister for Consumer Affairs of Western Australia
- In office 25 February 1988 – 16 February 1993
- Premier: Peter Dowding; Carmen Lawrence

Minister for Police, Emergency Services and the Aged of Western Australia
- In office 19 February 1990 – 16 February 1993
- Premier: Carmen Lawrence

Member of the Western Australian Legislative Council for the Electoral region of North Metropolitan
- In office 22 May 1983 – 21 May 1997

Personal details
- Born: Graham John Edwards; 18 July 1946 (age 80) Kalgoorlie, Western Australia, Australia
- Party: Labor
- Occupation: Soldier, politician, veteran's officer

Graham John Edwards AM (born 18 July 1946) is an Australian soldier, veterans' advocate and Labor Party member who represented the electorate of Cowan in the Australian House of Representatives from 1998 to 2007.

He was born in Kalgoorlie, Western Australia, and voluntarily joined the Australian Army for service in the Vietnam War in 1968. On 12 May 1970, he was severely injured, losing both legs. After leaving the Army he joined the Department of Defence as an officer with the Vietnam Veterans' Counselling Service. He was elected to the Council of the City of Stirling in 1981.

Edwards was elected to the Western Australian Legislative Council in 1983. He was Parliamentary Secretary to the Cabinet 1987, Minister for Sport and Recreation 1987–89, Minister for Consumer Affairs 1988–93, Minister for Racing and Gaming, Sport and Recreation and Youth 1989–90, Minister for Police and Emergency Services 1990–93, Minister for the Aged 1990–91. Following the defeat of the Labor government of Carmen Lawrence in 1993, he was Leader of the Opposition in the Legislative Council and Shadow Minister for Tourism and Fisheries 1993–94. He retired from the Legislative Council in 1997.

Edwards was first elected to the Australian parliament at the 1998 federal election. He retired from politics at the 2007 federal election.

He competed in the 1993 Hanoi Marathon. At the time, he was 46 years old. At the time he was Western Australia's Minister for police, emergency services, and sport and recreation. At the 2000 Summer Paralympics, he served as an Athlete Liaison Officer (ALO). In 2000, he was the Chairman of the Australian Paralympic Committee for W.A.

== Honours ==
On 1 January 2001, Edwards was awarded the Australian Sports Medal for "service as vice president of the APF from 1990 to 1993". On 11 June 2012, he was named a Member of the Order of Australia for "service to the Parliaments of Australia and Western Australia, to veterans through advocacy and support roles, and to people with a disability."

Around 2012 he was elected the Western Australian State President of the Returned Servicemen's League.

Parliament of Australia
Preceded by Richard Evans	Member for Cowan; 1998–2007	Succeeded by Luke Simpkins
