= Division of Cowan =

Australian federal electoral division

Coordinates: 31.782°S 115.846°E

Cowan Australian House of Representatives Division
- Interactive map of electorate boundaries from the 2025 federal election
- Created: 1984
- MP: Anne Aly
- Party: Labor
- Namesake: Edith Cowan
- Electors: 122,741 (2022)
- Area: 95 km^{2} (36.7 sq mi)
- Demographic: Outer metropolitan
Electorates around Cowan:
| Moore | Pearce | Pearce |
| Moore | Cowan | Hasluck |
| Moore | Perth | Hasluck |

The Division of Cowan (/kaʊən/) is an Australian Electoral Division in Western Australia.

Cowan is an inner-northern Perth seat lying generally between Morley Drive and Hepburn Avenue, extending from the Mitchell Freeway in the west to the Tonkin Highway and Lord Street in the east.

Cowan was once a marginal seat, but is now strongly held by the Australian Labor Party. The current MP is Anne Aly, and member of Labor and the first Muslim woman elected to federal parliament. She speaks Arabic and has previously worked in the Western Australia public service as a senior policy advisor.

== History ==
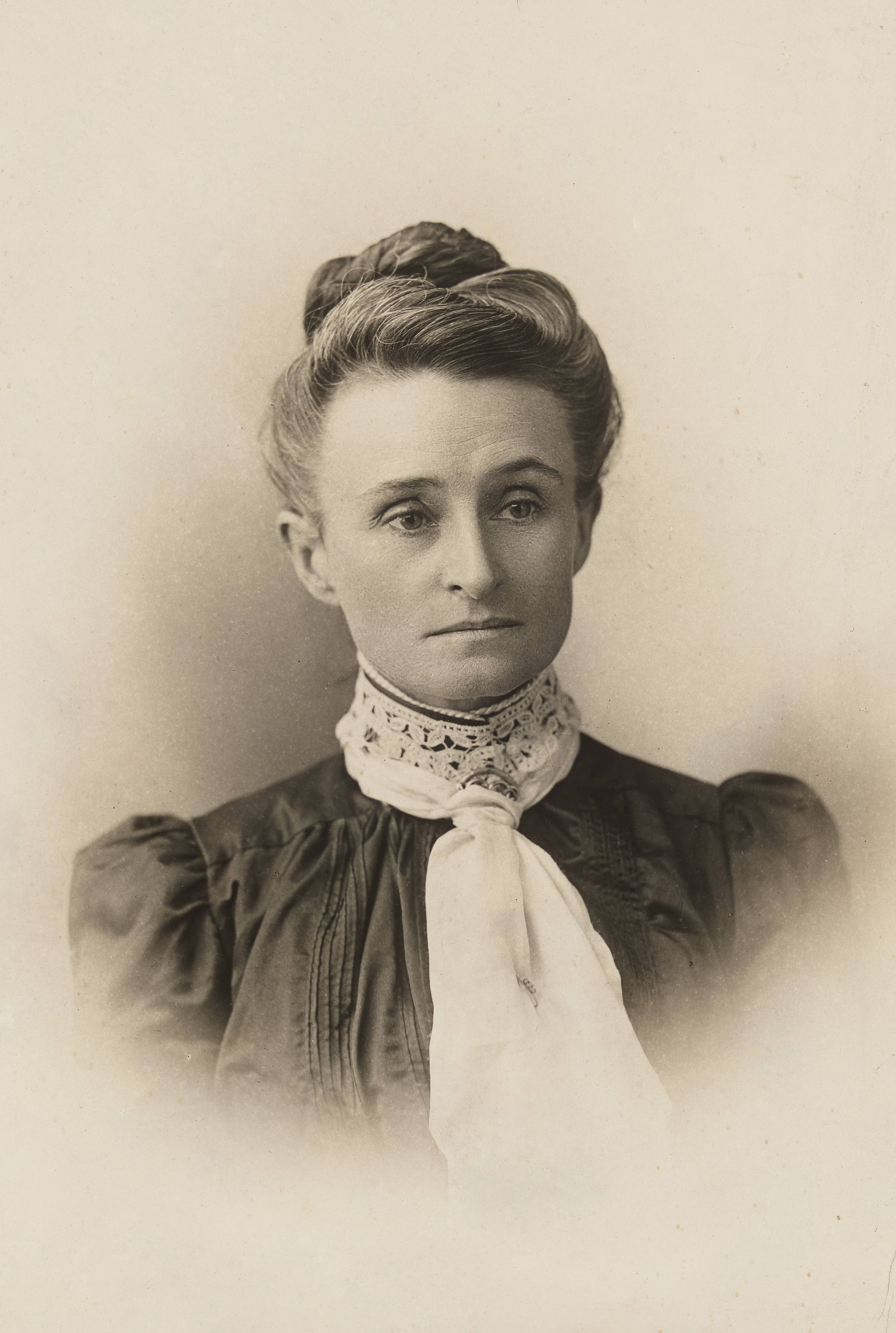
Edith Cowan, the division's namesake

The division was created in 1984 and is named for Edith Cowan, the first woman elected to an Australian Parliament. It is a marginal seat, changing hands between the Australian Labor Party and the Liberal Party. All but one of its members has served at least one term in opposition.

For example, at the 2007 election, the retirement of sitting member Graham Edwards resulted in Labor losing the seat to his Liberal challenger from 2004, Luke Simpkins, even as Labor ended 11 years of Coalition rule. Simpkins retained Cowan by defeating Labor candidate Liz Prime and retained the seat at the 2010 and 2013 elections. A redistribution in 2015 saw Cowan undergo a significant boundary change which saw the Liberal margin drop from a fairly safe 7.5% to a marginal 4.5%. The redistribution saw Labor target the seat at the upcoming 2016 election. At that election the Labor candidate, Anne Aly, became the first Muslim woman elected to the House of Representatives by narrowly defeating Simpkins. Aly retained the seat almost as narrowly in 2019, but was re-elected in 2022 with a significantly increased margin.

== Geography ==
Since 1984, federal electoral division boundaries in Australia have been determined at redistributions by a redistribution committee appointed by the Australian Electoral Commission. Redistributions occur for the boundaries of divisions in a particular state, and they occur every seven years, or sooner if a state's representation entitlement changes or when divisions of a state are malapportioned.

In August 2021, the Australian Electoral Commission (AEC) announced that the Wanneroo suburbs of Ashby, Darch, Gnangara, Hocking, Jandabup, Landsdale, Madeley, Pearsall, Sinagra, Tapping, Wangara and Wanneroo, and the Swan suburbs of Cullacabardee and a small part of Ballajura, would be transferred from Cowan to the seat of Pearce, while the Swan suburbs of Bennett Springs and Whiteman would be transferred to the seat of Hasluck, and Cowan's portion of Kingsley would be transferred to the seat of Moore. Cowan would consequently gain the Stirling suburbs of Balcatta, Balga, Dianella, Hamersley, Mirrabooka, Nollamara, Stirling, Westminster and part of Osborne Park, along with the Bayswater suburbs of Noranda and part of Morley, from the abolished seat of Stirling. These boundary changes took place for the 2022 Australian federal election.

Cowan is bordered by Hepburn Avenue to the north, Tonkin Highway, Reid Highway, and Lord Street to the east, Morley Drive, Main Street, and Hutton Street to the south, and the Mitchell Freeway to the west. The division covers a large portion of the City of Stirling, parts of the City of Swan and the City of Wanneroo, and minor portions of the City of Bayswater and the City of Joondalup. It includes the suburbs of:

- Alexander Heights
- Balcatta
- Balga
- Ballajura (part)
- Beechboro
- Dianella
- Girrawheen
- Greenwood
- Hamersley
- Kiara
- Koondoola
- Lockridge
- Malaga
- Marangaroo
- Mirrabooka
- Morley (part)
- Nollamara
- Noranda
- Osborne Park (part)
- Stirling
- Warwick
- Westminster

== Members ==
| Image | Member | Party | Term | Notes |
|---|---|---|---|---|
| | Carolyn Jakobsen (1947–) | Labor | 1 December 1984 – 13 March 1993 | Lost seat |
| | Richard Evans (1953–) | Liberal | 13 March 1993 – 3 October 1998 | Lost seat |
| | Graham Edwards (1946–) | Labor | 3 October 1998 – 17 October 2007 | Previously a member of the Western Australian Legislative Council. Retired. Last veteran of the Vietnam War to serve in the House of Representatives |
| | Luke Simpkins (1964–) | Liberal | 24 November 2007 – 2 July 2016 | Lost seat |
| | Anne Aly (1967–) | Labor | 2 July 2016 – present | Incumbent. Currently a minister under Albanese |

== Election results ==
2025 Australian federal election: Cowan
| Party | Candidate | Votes | % | ±% |
|---|---|---|---|---|
| Labor | Anne Aly | 44,826 | 46.63 | +0.88 |
| Liberal | Felicia Adeniyi | 23,233 | 24.17 | −6.79 |
| Greens | Matthew Count | 10,367 | 10.78 | +0.79 |
| One Nation | Bradley Yates | 4,869 | 5.06 | +2.12 |
| Legalise Cannabis | John Bell | 4,103 | 4.27 | +4.27 |
| Independent | Wade McDonald | 3,417 | 3.55 | +3.55 |
| Christians | Wesley D'Costa | 3,015 | 3.14 | +1.13 |
| Trumpet of Patriots | Charles Smith | 2,311 | 2.40 | +1.34 |
| Total formal votes | | 96,141 | 93.04 | +0.40 |
| Informal votes | | 7,194 | 6.96 | −0.40 |
| Turnout | | 103,335 | 88.71 | +1.86 |
Two-party-preferred result
| Labor | Anne Aly | 61,179 | 63.63 | +3.69 |
| Liberal | Felicia Adeniyi | 34,962 | 36.37 | −3.69 |
| Labor hold | | Swing | +3.69 | |
