= Richard Evans (Australian politician) =

Australian politician

Member of the Australian Parliament for Cowan
- In office 13 March 1993 – 3 October 1998
- Preceded by: Carolyn Jakobsen
- Succeeded by: Graham Edwards

Personal details
- Born: Richard David Conroy Evans; 7 September 1953 (age 72) Melbourne
- Party: Liberal Party of Australia
- Children: 3
- Education: University of Western Australia

Richard David Conroy Evans (born 7 September 1953) is an Australian businessman and former politician.

Evans served as a Liberal Party of Australia member in the Australian House of Representatives. He was the member for Cowan from 1993 to 1998.

From the late 1970s, Evans was a corporate executive. He has was the CEO of the Franchise Council of Australia, Executive Director of the Australian Retailers Association, Executive Director of Clubs Victoria and the Council of Textile and Fashion Industries Australia.

In 2005 he graduated Bachelor of Arts from University of Western Australia, graduated Masters of Creative Writing from University of Canberra in 2012, and has a Graduate Certificate in Tertiary Teaching from Curtin University in 2019.

In 2002, Evans was appointed Executive Director of the Franchise Council of Australia and helped reshape the governance and compliance practices of this sector. In 2007 he was appointed the Executive Director of the Australian Retailers Association. He has also served as Executive Director of the Council of Textile and Fashion Industries Australia and Clubs Victoria. In these roles, he represented these organisations at productivity commission hearings, various government task forces and consultations, regulatory body advisory groups, industry forums and legislative advisory boards. He has presented at many national and international universities on business, advocacy, and political practices in regulated industries.

Evans married Dr. Julia Camm on 2 October 2010. The couple live in the Whitsundays Queensland.

Evans has three children from a previous marriage.

Parliament of Australia
Preceded by Carolyn Jakobsen	Member for Cowan; 1993–1998	Succeeded by Graham Edwards
