= Carolyn Jakobsen =

Australian politician

Member of the Australian Parliament for Cowan
- In office 1 December 1984 – 13 March 1993
- Preceded by: New seat
- Succeeded by: Richard Evans

Personal details
- Born: Carolyn Anne Jakobsen; 11 September 1947 (age 78) Auckland, New Zealand
- Citizenship: Australia; New Zealand (to 1990)
- Party: Labor
- Occupation: Politician

Carolyn Anne Jakobsen (born 11 September 1947) is a former Australian politician. She served in the House of Representatives from 1984 to 1993, representing the Division of Cowan for the Australian Labor Party (ALP).

== Early life ==
Jakobsen was born on 11 September 1947 in Auckland, New Zealand. She did not renounce her New Zealand citizenship until January 1990, following media attention given to the parliamentary eligibility requirements of section 44(i) of the constitution. Prior to entering parliament herself she worked as a political staffer. She was active in the Australian Labor Party (Western Australian Branch) and served as president of the ALP's Manning branch.

== Parliament ==
Jakobsen was elected to the newly created Division of Cowan at the 1984 federal election. She was re-elected at the 1987 and 1990 elections before being defeated by the Liberal candidate Richard Evans at the 1993 election.

In parliament, Jakobsen served on a number of standing and select committees. She was elected chair of the Australian Labor Party Caucus in 1990, the first woman to hold the position. She also led parliamentary delegations to New Zealand in 1988 and to Scandinavia in 1990. Jakobsen was a member of the party's left faction. She opposed Australian involvement in the 1991 Gulf War, and was one of ten MPs censured by the ALP National Executive for walking out on a pro-war speech by Prime Minister Bob Hawke.

== Later activities ==
Jakobsen has served on the Murdoch University senate, the Swan River Trust, the Waste Management Board, and the board of Waste Smart WA.

Parliament of Australia
Preceded by New seat	Member for Cowan; 1984–1993	Succeeded by Richard Evans
