= Allan Rocher =

Australian politician (1936–2016)

Senator for Western Australia
- In office 1 July 1978 – 10 February 1981
- Succeeded by: John Martyr

Member of the Australian Parliament for Curtin
- In office 21 February 1981 – 3 October 1998
- Preceded by: Victor Garland
- Succeeded by: Julie Bishop

Personal details
- Born: 16 February 1936 Deloraine, Tasmania, Australia
- Died: 18 March 2016 (aged 80) Perth, Western Australia
- Party: Liberal (1978–1995); Independent (1995–1998)

Allan Charles Rocher (16 February 1936 – 18 March 2016) was an Australian politician, who served as a Liberal senator for Western Australia from 1978 to 1981 and member of the Australian House of Representatives Division of Curtin from 1981 to 1998. Up until 1996 he represented the Liberal Party of Australia.

Rocher was born in Deloraine, Tasmania. He worked as a commercial arbitrator and then as a registered builder. He eventually became president of the Master Builders' Association of Western Australia.

Rocher was elected as a senator for Western Australia at the 1977 election, taking up his seat on 1 July 1978. He won Liberal Party endorsement to contest Curtin at the Curtin by-election on 21 February 1981, following the resignation from parliament of Victor Garland. This preselection was also contested by fellow senator Fred Chaney.

Rocher resigned from the Senate on 10 February 1981 in order to stand at the by-election, which he won. He held the seat until 1998. He was shadow minister for defence science and personnel from August 1992 to April 1993.

In March 1994 he was elected as the inaugural second deputy speaker of the House of Representatives.

Rocher lost Liberal Party endorsement for the seat prior to the 1996 election to Ken Court, the brother of then WA Premier Richard Court, and then resigned from the Liberal Party.

He successfully recontested his seat as an Independent in that election, winning with 29.4% of the primary vote and the aid of Australian Labor Party preferences. Although an independent, and despite having the support of his friend Prime Minister John Howard, Rocher was unsuccessful in gaining Liberal preselection for Curtin for the 1998 election.

Rocher lost his seat to Liberal candidate Julie Bishop at the 1998 election, his vote having dropped to 17.7%. He was later appointed Australian Consul-General in Los Angeles.

He died on 18 March 2016 at the age of 80.

Parliament of Australia
Preceded by Victor Garland	Member for Curtin; 1981–1998	Succeeded by Julie Bishop
Diplomatic posts
Preceded by Michael Johnson	Australian Consul-General in Los Angeles; 1999–2002	Succeeded by John Olsen
