= George Gear =

Australian politician

The Honourable George Gear

Mayor of the City of Melville
- In office 21 October 2019 – 24 October 2023
- Preceded by: Russell Aubrey
- Succeeded by: Katy Mair

Member of the Australian Parliament for Tangney
- In office 5 March 1983 – 1 December 1984
- Preceded by: Peter Shack
- Succeeded by: Peter Shack

Member of the Australian Parliament for Canning
- In office 1 December 1984 – 2 March 1996
- Preceded by: Wendy Fatin
- Succeeded by: Ricky Johnston

Personal details
- Born: 8 March 1947 (age 79) Kalgoorlie, Western Australia
- Party: Australian Labor Party
- Spouse: Carol Howman
- Occupation: Teacher

George Gear (born 8 March 1947) is a former Australian politician. He was the mayor of the City of Melville in Western Australia from 2019 to 2023, and had previously served from 1983 to 1996 in Federal Parliament including as Assistant Treasurer under the Keating government.

== Background ==
Gear was born in Kalgoorlie, Western Australia and received a Bachelor of Education at Mount Lawley College of Advanced Education, a Diploma of Electrical Engineering at Fremantle Technical College and a Diploma of Technical Teaching from Perth Technical College. Prior to entering federal parliament, he was a lecturer in electrical trades and engineering at TAFE. In 1969, he married Carol Howman and they have one son and one daughter.

== Career ==
Gear was elected for the Australian Labor Party as the member for the seat of Tangney at the 1983 election for the Australian House of Representatives, defeating incumbent Liberal Peter Shack. However, after a redistribution erased his majority and made Tangney a notional Liberal seat, Gear shifted to the nearby seat of Canning for the 1984 election and won. He had to fend off spirited challenges from Liberal opponent Ricky Johnston in the next four elections, particularly when his seat started shifting southward toward Mandurah. At the 1996 federal election, Johnston was successful at her fifth attempt, making him one of eight ministers to be defeated in the 1996 election.

=== Federal Parliament ===
Gear was Government Whip from May 1990 to March 1993. During this time he was a member of the House Standing Committee on Finance and Public Administration which conducted an extensive Inquiry into Australia's banking system. He was also Chairman of the House Privileges Committee.

In 1991 Gear led a parliamentary delegation to the United Nations General Assembly in New York between September and December. He was attached to the Australian mission and worked as a part of their team in negotiations, speeches and chairing meetings as required.

In March 1993, Gear was elected to the ministry and was appointed Assistant Treasurer in the Second Keating Ministry. He represented Australia at the Bank for Reconstruction and Development in London, The World Bank and International Monetary Fund in Washington, The Asia Development Bank in Nice, the Pacific Forum in Port Moresby and the annual bilateral talks with the Japanese Government in Tokyo.

Gear was the Federal Minister in charge of the Australian Taxation Office, National Competition Policy where he set up the Australian Competition & Consumer Commission and the Industry Commission. He also set up the National Competition Council to arbitrate and ensure access to important infrastructure such as rail lines. He was also minister in charge of the Foreign Investment Review Board

=== Local government ===
In July 2019, Gear released a media statement declaring his intention to contest the role of Mayor in the City of Melville for the 2019 local government elections. The position had been occupied since 2007 by Russell Aubrey, whose third term as Mayor had been marred with public controversy and internal division. A long-time Melville resident, Gear ran his campaign on a platform of rebuilding confidence in the council, restoring integrity to City processes and decision-making, mending relations with ratepayers and residents and giving ratepayers better value for money.

Following the conclusion of polling conducted by the Western Australian Electoral Commission on 19 October 2019, Gear was elected as mayor, capturing 42 per cent of the votes, ahead of rivals Russell Aubrey (29 per cent) and Katy Mair (29 per cent).

Gear's term as mayor ended in October 2023, when he lost the election to Katy Mair. Gear received the highest number of primary votes (18%, vs Mair's 17%) but lost on preferences. This was the first time that optional preferential voting had been used in local government elections; previous elections (since 2009) had used first-past-the-post voting.

== Notes ==
Political offices
New title	Assistant Treasurer; 1993 – 1996	Succeeded by James Short
Parliament of Australia
Preceded by Peter Shack	Member for Tangney; 1983 – 1984	Succeeded by Peter Shack
Preceded by Wendy Fatin	Member for Canning; 1984 – 1996	Succeeded by Ricky Johnston
