= Wendy Fatin =

Australian politician

The Honourable Wendy Fatin

Minister for the Arts and Territories
- In office 27 December 1991 – 24 March 1993
- Prime Minister: Paul Keating
- Preceded by: David Simmons
- Succeeded by: Ros Kelly

Minister assisting the Prime Minister for the Status of Women
- In office 4 April 1990 – 24 March 1993
- Prime Minister: Bob Hawke; Paul Keating
- Preceded by: Margaret Reynolds
- Succeeded by: Ros Kelly

Minister for Local Government
- In office 4 April 1990 – 27 December 1991
- Prime Minister: Bob Hawke; Paul Keating
- Preceded by: Margaret Reynolds
- Succeeded by: David Simmons

Member of the Australian Parliament for Brand
- In office 1 December 1984 – 29 January 1996
- Preceded by: New seat
- Succeeded by: Kim Beazley

Member of the Australian Parliament for Canning
- In office 5 March 1983 – 1 December 1984
- Preceded by: Mel Bungey
- Succeeded by: George Gear

Personal details
- Born: Wendy Frances Fimmel; 10 April 1941 (age 85) Harvey, Western Australia
- Party: Labor
- Education: Western Australian Institute of Technology
- Occupation: Nurse

Wendy Frances Fatin (née Fimmel; born 10 April 1941) is a retired Australian politician. She was a member of the Australian Labor Party (ALP) and was the first woman from Western Australia elected to the House of Representatives, representing the division of Canning (1983–1984) and Brand (1984–96). She held ministerial office in the Hawke and Keating governments, serving as Minister for Local Government (1990–1991), Minister assisting the Prime Minister for the Status of Women (1990–1993), and Minister for the Arts and Territories (1991–1993).

== Early life ==
Fatin was born on 10 April 1941 in Harvey, Western Australia. She is one of three children born to Jim and Nell Fimmel. She spent her early years on her parents' dairy farm in Harvey and attended the local convent school.

Fatin's family moved to Perth in 1952 where her father undertook further education, eventually becoming a lecturer in business law and accounting at the Western Australian Institute of Technology (WAIT). She completed her secondary schooling at St Joseph's School and Ladies' College in Perth. She subsequently trained as a nurse, as that was one of the only fields with a bursary available, and also briefly worked as an assistant librarian. Fatin lived in Malaysia for a period in the mid-1960s, where her husband was stationed as a medical officer at RAAF Butterworth.

In 1972, Fatin became president of the newly formed Harvest Guild, one of the Women's Service Guilds of Western Australia. She "appeared in a controversial television interview to advocate legislation for the advertising of contraceptives". In the same year, Fatin became involved with the Women's Electoral Lobby (WEL). She joined the Victorian branch in October 1972 and travelled to the inaugural national conference in Canberra in January 1973. She then helped create the WEL's Western Australian branch, along with her future parliamentary colleague Patricia Giles who was elected convenor.

From 1974 to 1975, Fatin worked in the office of ALP senator John Wheeldon, within the Department of Repatriation and Compensation and Department of Social Security. After the dismissal of the Whitlam government in 1975, she returned to Perth and completed a Bachelor of Science in nursing at WAIT. She had previously completed several units of an arts degree at the University of Western Australia.

== Politics ==
Fatin served as secretary of the ALP's Subiaco and Maylands branches and was elected state president of the Labor Women's Organisation in 1977. She later served on the party's state executive from 1982 to 1983 and as a delegate to National Conference.

At the 1983 election, Fatin was elected to the House of Representatives for the Division of Canning, winning the seat from the Liberals' Mel Bungey on a 9.1% swing. She is notable as being the first Western Australian woman to win a seat in that House. Following an electoral redistribution, she won the new seat of Brand at the 1984 election, holding it until her retirement in 1996.

In April 1990, Fatin was appointed to the Hawke ministry as Minister for Local Government and Minister assisting the Prime Minister for the Status of Women. In December 1991, she left Local Government and was appointed Minister for the Arts and Territories, retaining her Status of Women role. She stepped down from the ministry after the 1993 election, and chose to retire from politics at the 1996 election, being succeeded in her seat by deputy prime minister Kim Beazley, who had moved from the marginal seat of Swan.

== Later life ==
Her advocacy work continued beyond her retirement from politics, and she is an honorary life member of the Australian Reproductive Health Alliance.

Political offices
Preceded by Margaret Reynolds	Minister for Local Government; 1990–1991	Succeeded by David Simmons
Preceded by Margaret Reynolds	Minister assisting the Prime Minister for the Status of Women; 1990–1993	Succeeded by Ros Kelly
Preceded by David Simmons	Minister for the Arts and Territories; 1991–1993	Succeeded by Ros Kelly
Parliament of Australia
Preceded by Mel Bungey	Member for Canning; 1983–1984	Succeeded by George Gear
New division	Member for Brand; 1984–1996	Succeeded by Kim Beazley
