= Electoral results for the Division of Hasluck =

Australian division election results

This is a list of electoral results for the Division of Hasluck in Australian federal elections from the division's creation in 2001 until the present.

== Members ==
Member	Party	Term
Sharryn Jackson	Labor	2001–2004
Stuart Henry	Liberal	2004–2007
Sharryn Jackson	Labor	2007–2010
Ken Wyatt	Liberal	2010–2022
Tania Lawrence	Labor	2022–present

== Election results ==
=== Elections in the 2020s ===
==== 2025 ====
2025 Australian federal election: Hasluck
Party	Candidate	Votes	%	±%
Labor	Tania Lawrence			
One Nation	Adrian Deeth			
Great Australian	Dawn Michelle Kelly			
Christians	David Kingston			
Greens	Tamica Matson			
Liberal	David Goode			
Legalise Cannabis	Leo Treasure			
Total formal votes				
Informal votes				
Turnout				

==== 2022 ====
2022 Australian federal election: Hasluck
Party	Candidate	Votes	%	±%
Labor	Tania Lawrence	39,144	39.73	+9.41
Liberal	Ken Wyatt	32,889	33.39	−10.59
Greens	Brendan Sturcke	10,826	10.99	+0.24
One Nation	Ian Monck	3,783	3.84	−2.29
Independent	Jeanene Williams	3,318	3.37	+3.37
United Australia	Will Scott	2,973	3.02	+0.79
Western Australia	Pauline Clark	2,561	2.60	+1.00
Federation	Marijanna Smith	1,739	1.77	+1.77
Liberal Democrats	Steven McCreanor	1,280	1.30	+1.30
Total formal votes		98,513	94.46	+0.16
Informal votes		5,782	5.54	−0.16
Turnout		104,295	88.74	−0.50
Two-party-preferred result
Labor	Tania Lawrence	55,166	56.00	+11.89
Liberal	Ken Wyatt	43,347	44.00	−11.89
Labor gain from Liberal		Swing	+11.89	

Alluvial diagram for preference flows in the seat of Hasluck in the 2022 federal election. indicates at what stage the winning candidate had over 50% of the votes and was declared the winner.

=== Elections in the 2010s ===
==== 2019 ====
2019 Australian federal election: Hasluck
Party	Candidate	Votes	%	±%
Liberal	Ken Wyatt	36,737	43.62	−1.33
Labor	James Martin	25,794	30.63	−4.63
Greens	Lee-Anne Miles	9,648	11.46	−1.20
One Nation	Tim Orr	4,445	5.28	+5.28
Shooters, Fishers, Farmers	Fiona White-Hartig	2,441	2.90	+2.90
United Australia	Mike Dale	1,929	2.29	+2.29
Christians	Brady Williams	1,678	1.99	−1.45
Western Australia	Stephen Phelan	1,546	1.84	+1.84
Total formal votes		84,218	94.52	−1.44
Informal votes		4,880	5.48	+1.44
Turnout		89,098	90.34	+1.52
Two-party-preferred result
Liberal	Ken Wyatt	46,494	55.21	+3.16
Labor	James Martin	37,724	44.79	−3.16
Liberal hold		Swing	+3.16	

==== 2016 ====
2016 Australian federal election: Hasluck
Party	Candidate	Votes	%	±%
Liberal	Ken Wyatt	36,519	44.95	−1.18
Labor	Bill Leadbetter	28,652	35.26	+5.78
Greens	Patrick Hyslop	10,283	12.66	+2.35
Rise Up Australia	Henry Barnard	2,999	3.69	+3.34
Christians	Phil Twiss	2,798	3.44	+1.19
Total formal votes		81,251	95.96	+1.53
Informal votes		3,425	4.04	−1.53
Turnout		84,676	88.82	−3.02
Two-party-preferred result
Liberal	Ken Wyatt	42,294	52.05	−3.97
Labor	Bill Leadbetter	38,957	47.95	+3.97
Liberal hold		Swing	−3.97	

==== 2013 ====
2013 Australian federal election: Hasluck
Party	Candidate	Votes	%	±%
Liberal	Ken Wyatt	38,951	45.42	+3.43
Labor	Adrian Evans	28,081	32.74	−4.79
Greens	Peter Langlands	6,546	7.63	−5.15
Palmer United	Robin Scott	5,885	6.86	+6.86
Sex Party	Chris Munro	2,236	2.61	+2.61
Christians	Jason Whittaker	2,130	2.48	+2.48
Family First	Kyran Sharrin	1,365	1.59	−0.67
Katter's Australian	Daniel Stevens	569	0.66	+0.66
Total formal votes		85,763	94.32	−0.04
Informal votes		5,163	5.68	+0.04
Turnout		90,926	92.34	−0.73
Two-party-preferred result
Liberal	Ken Wyatt	47,057	54.87	+4.30
Labor	Adrian Evans	38,706	45.13	−4.30
Liberal hold		Swing	+4.30	

==== 2010 ====
2010 Australian federal election: Hasluck
Party	Candidate	Votes	%	±%
Liberal	Ken Wyatt	34,638	41.99	−1.38
Labor	Sharryn Jackson	30,957	37.53	−3.82
Greens	Glenice Smith	10,539	12.78	+4.47
Christian Democrats	Linda Brewer	2,505	3.04	+0.04
Family First	Jim McCourt	1,861	2.26	+1.03
Ecology, Social Justice, Aboriginal	Dot Henry	1,457	1.77	+1.77
Climate Sceptics	Andrew Middleton	539	0.65	+0.65
Total formal votes		82,496	94.36	−1.31
Informal votes		4,927	5.64	+1.31
Turnout		87,423	93.11	−0.56
Two-party-preferred result
Liberal	Ken Wyatt	41,722	50.57	+1.42
Labor	Sharryn Jackson	40,774	49.43	−1.42
Liberal gain from Labor		Swing	+1.42	

=== Elections in the 2000s ===
==== 2007 ====
2007 Australian federal election: Hasluck
Party	Candidate	Votes	%	±%
Liberal	Stuart Henry	31,541	42.94	−2.43
Labor	Sharryn Jackson	30,471	41.48	+3.19
Greens	Jane Bremmer	6,258	8.52	+1.66
Christian Democrats	Rob Merrells	2,229	3.03	−0.07
One Nation	Bill Gaugg	1,121	1.53	−1.84
Family First	Stephen Bolt	863	1.17	+1.17
Citizens Electoral Council	Neil Vincent	687	0.94	−0.34
Liberty & Democracy	Siou Hong Chia	292	0.40	+0.40
Total formal votes		73,462	95.58	+0.56
Informal votes		3,397	4.42	−0.56
Turnout		76,859	93.35	−0.14
Two-party-preferred result
Labor	Sharryn Jackson	37,658	51.26	+3.08
Liberal	Stuart Henry	35,805	48.74	−3.08
Labor gain from Liberal		Swing	+3.08	

==== 2004 ====
2004 Australian federal election: Hasluck
Party	Candidate	Votes	%	±%
Liberal	Stuart Henry	32,457	45.37	+6.04
Labor	Sharryn Jackson	27,395	38.29	+0.06
Greens	Jane Bremmer	4,911	6.86	+1.19
One Nation	Paul Nield	2,413	3.37	−3.63
Christian Democrats	Terry Ryan	2,221	3.10	+0.69
Democrats	Nicola Hannah	1,236	1.73	−3.18
Citizens Electoral Council	Simon Hall	913	1.28	+0.14
Total formal votes		71,546	95.02	+0.82
Informal votes		3,752	4.98	−0.82
Turnout		75,298	93.49	−1.72
Two-party-preferred result
Liberal	Stuart Henry	37,078	51.82	+3.60
Labor	Sharryn Jackson	34,468	48.18	−3.60
Liberal gain from Labor		Swing	+3.60	

==== 2001 ====
2001 Australian federal election: Hasluck
Party	Candidate	Votes	%	±%
Liberal	Bethwyn Chan	27,660	39.33	+2.49
Labor	Sharryn Jackson	26,890	38.23	−1.15
One Nation	James Hopkinson	4,920	7.00	−4.72
Greens	Luke Edmonds	3,986	5.67	+0.86
Democrats	Peter Markham	3,455	4.91	+0.08
Christian Democrats	Terry Ryan	1,695	2.41	+1.37
Citizens Electoral Council	Ronnie McLean	804	1.14	+0.89
Curtin Labor Alliance	Michael Daniels	520	0.74	+0.74
National	Ros Hegarty	401	0.57	+0.24
Total formal votes		70,331	94.20	−1.43
Informal votes		4,334	5.80	+1.43
Turnout		74,665	95.75	
Two-party-preferred result
Labor	Sharryn Jackson	36,420	51.78	−0.77
Liberal	Bethwyn Chan	33,911	48.22	+0.77
Labor notional hold		Swing	−0.77	
