= Results of the 2007 Australian federal election in Western Australia =

2007 Australian federal election (Western Australia)
- 24 November 2007

All 15 Western Australian seats in the Australian House of Representatives and 6 seats in the Australian Senate
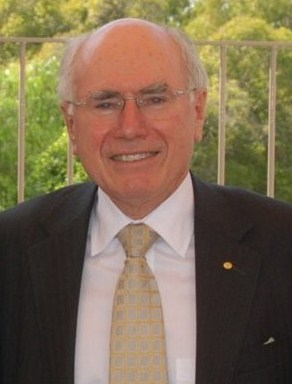

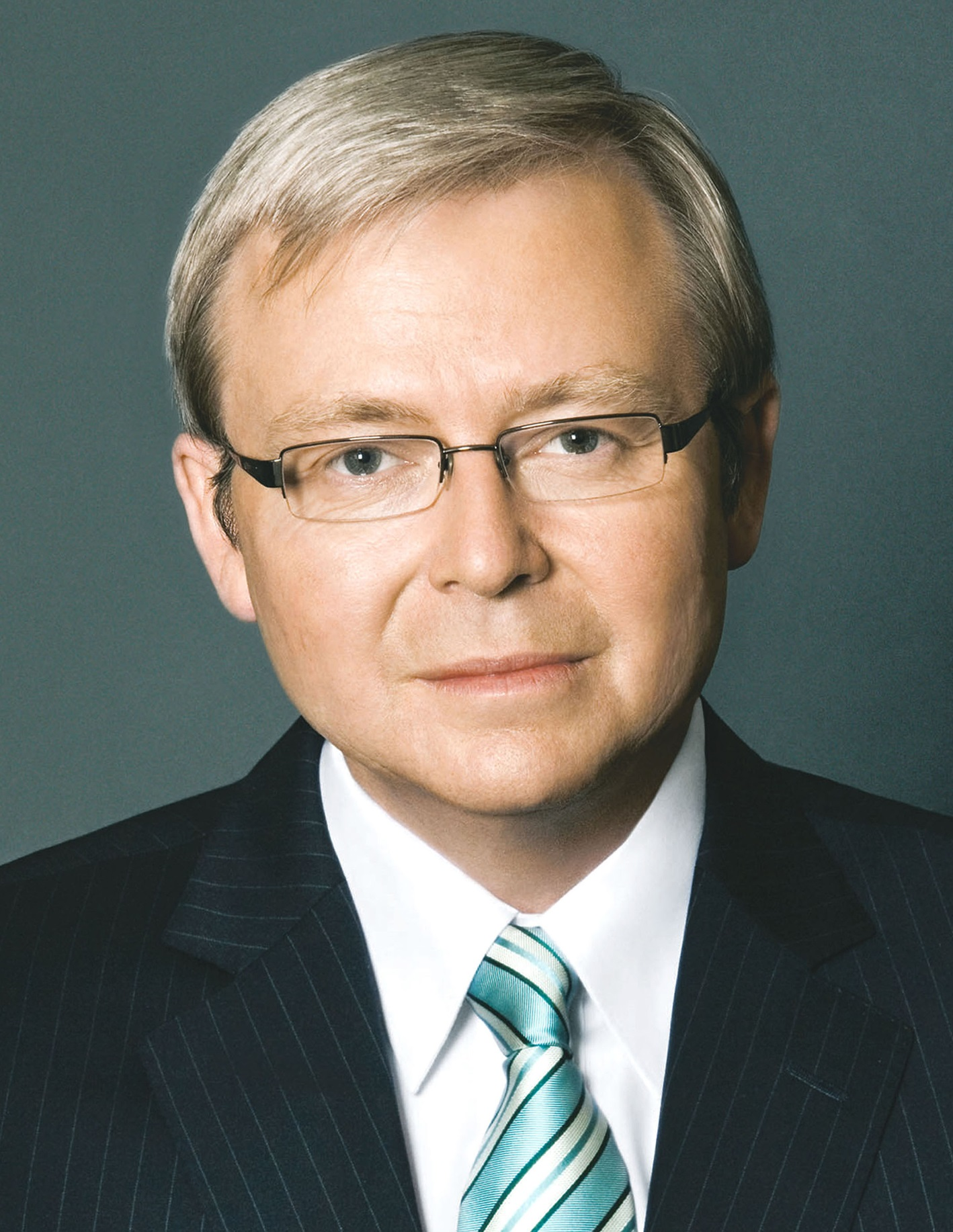
	First party	Second party
Leader	John Howard	Kevin Rudd
Party	Liberal/National coalition	Labor
Last election	10 seats	5 seats
Seats won	11 seats	4 seats
Seat change	▲1	▼1
Percentage	47.45%	36.80%
Swing	▼1.24	▲2.05
TPP	53.26%	46.74%
TPP swing	▼2.14	▲2.14
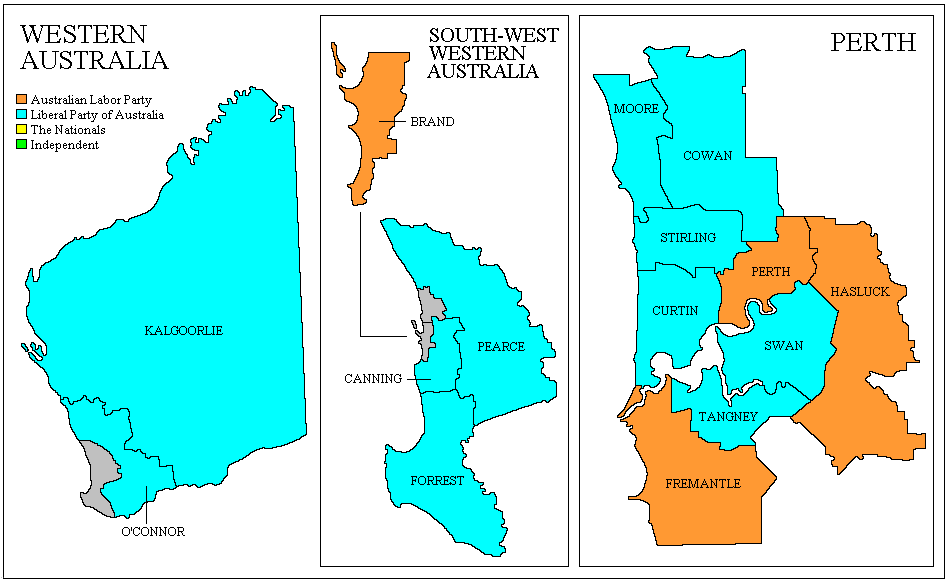
- Electoral divisions: Western Australia

This is a list of electoral division results for the 2007 Australian federal election in the state of Western Australia.

== Overall results ==
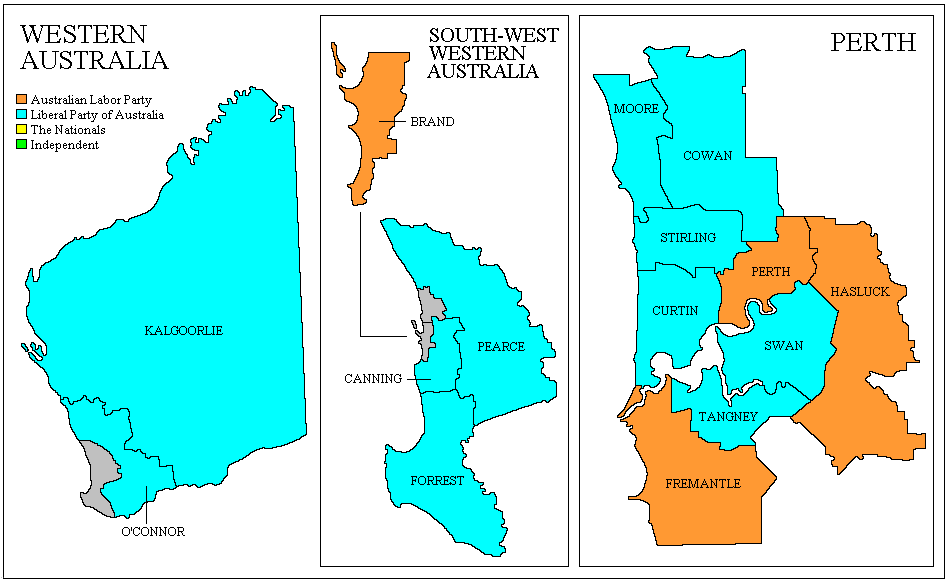
Electoral divisions: Western Australia

Turnout 93.26% (CV) — Informal 3.85%
Party	Votes	%	Swing	Seats	Change
Liberal	545,365	46.31	–1.82	11	▲1
Labor	433,342	36.80	+2.05	4	▼1
Greens	105,106	8.93	+1.26		
Christian Democrats	24,838	2.11	–0.14		
Family First	14,215	1.21	+0.97		
One Nation	13,529	1.15	–1.37		
National	13,459	1.14	+0.58		
Citizens Electoral Council	3,115	0.26	–0.34		
Liberty and Democracy Party	2,730	0.23	+0.23		
Socialist Alliance	1,141	0.10	–0.05		
What Women Want	590	0.05	+0.05		
Socialist Equality Party (Note: Unknown if this is the same group that would be known as Socialist Equality Party from 2010 onwards)	157	0.01	+0.01		
Independents	19,950	1.69	+0.34		
Total	1,177,537			15	
Two-party-preferred vote
Liberal	627,211	53.26	–2.14	11	▲1
Labor	550,326	46.74	+2.14	4	▼1
Invalid/blank votes		47,152	3.85	−1.47	
Registered voters/turnout		1,313,201	93.26		
Source: Commonwealth Election 2007

Labor to Liberal: Cowan, Swan

Liberal to Labor: Hasluck.

== Results by division ==
=== Brand ===
2007 Australian federal election: Brand
Party	Candidate	Votes	%	±%
Labor	Gary Gray	38,131	46.15	−0.94
Liberal	Phil Edman	31,882	38.58	−1.31
Greens	Dawn Jecks	7,110	8.60	+3.77
Christian Democrats	Brent Tremain	2,061	2.49	+0.36
Family First	Andrew Newhouse	1,482	1.79	+1.79
One Nation	Robin Scott	1,321	1.60	−1.16
Liberty & Democracy	Huw Grossmith	350	0.42	+0.42
Citizens Electoral Council	Rob Totten	295	0.36	−0.64
Total formal votes		82,632	96.10	+1.90
Informal votes		3,354	3.90	−1.90
Turnout		85,986	93.50	+0.09
Two-party-preferred result
Labor	Gary Gray	45,959	55.62	+0.97
Liberal	Phil Edman	36,673	44.38	−0.97
Labor hold		Swing	+0.97	

=== Canning ===
2007 Australian federal election: Canning
Party	Candidate	Votes	%	±%
Liberal	Don Randall	42,639	49.70	−3.04
Labor	John Hughes	31,699	36.95	+4.07
Greens	Denise Hardie	6,396	7.45	+2.40
Christian Democrats	Kevin Swarts	2,427	2.83	+0.42
One Nation	Brian Deane	1,264	1.47	−1.26
Family First	Rodney Grasso	1,112	1.30	+0.29
Citizens Electoral Council	Brian McCarthy	261	0.30	−0.56
Total formal votes		85,798	96.70	+2.41
Informal votes		2,925	3.30	−2.41
Turnout		88,723	93.71	−0.07
Two-party-preferred result
Liberal	Don Randall	47,689	55.58	−3.96
Labor	John Hughes	38,109	44.42	+3.96
Liberal hold		Swing	−3.96	

=== Cowan ===
2007 Australian federal election: Cowan
Party	Candidate	Votes	%	±%
Liberal	Luke Simpkins	38,872	45.81	+1.42
Labor	Liz Prime	35,633	41.99	−1.88
Greens	Johannes Herrmann	4,778	5.63	+0.04
Christian Democrats	Martin Firth	1,584	1.87	−0.58
Family First	Rhonda Hamersley	1,452	1.71	+1.71
Liberty & Democracy	Ken Lee	1,003	1.18	+1.18
One Nation	Dave Tierney	783	0.92	−1.09
Independent	Norm Ramsay	558	0.66	+0.66
Citizens Electoral Council	Roger Blakeway	195	0.23	−0.14
Total formal votes		84,858	95.84	+0.85
Informal votes		3,679	4.16	−0.85
Turnout		88,537	94.79	+0.62
Two-party-preferred result
Liberal	Luke Simpkins	43,883	51.71	+2.49
Labor	Liz Prime	40,975	48.29	−2.49
Liberal gain from Labor		Swing	+2.49	

=== Curtin ===
2007 Australian federal election: Curtin
Party	Candidate	Votes	%	±%
Liberal	Julie Bishop	46,912	59.27	−0.32
Labor	Peter Grant	19,419	24.53	+0.78
Greens	Lee Hemsley	10,649	13.45	+1.97
Christian Democrats	Gail Forder	1,004	1.27	−0.41
Independent	Shahar Helel	445	0.56	+0.56
Family First	Bev Custers	394	0.50	+0.50
One Nation	Albert Caine	329	0.42	−0.56
Total formal votes		79,152	98.09	+1.61
Informal votes		1,542	1.91	−1.61
Turnout		80,694	93.72	+0.60
Two-party-preferred result
Liberal	Julie Bishop	50,320	63.57	−1.05
Labor	Peter Grant	28,832	36.43	+1.05
Liberal hold		Swing	−1.05	

=== Forrest ===
2007 Australian federal election: Forrest
Party	Candidate	Votes	%	±%
Liberal	Nola Marino	38,928	45.40	−8.02
Labor	Peter Macfarlane	25,883	30.18	+2.25
Independent	Noel Brunning	9,924	11.57	+11.57
Greens	Kingsley Gibson	7,150	8.34	−0.11
Christian Democrats	John Lewis	1,643	1.92	+0.32
Family First	Leighton Knoll	1,150	1.34	−0.31
One Nation	Jodie Yardley	928	1.08	−2.36
Citizens Electoral Council	Ian Tuffnell	144	0.17	−0.26
Total formal votes		85,750	96.67	+2.17
Informal votes		2,954	3.33	= −2.17
Turnout		88,704	94.69	+0.54
Two-party-preferred result
Liberal	Nola Marino	47,871	55.83	−4.62
Labor	Peter Macfarlane	37,879	44.17	+4.62
Liberal hold		Swing	−4.62	

=== Fremantle ===
2007 Australian federal election: Fremantle
Party	Candidate	Votes	%	±%
Labor	Melissa Parke	36,102	45.18	+0.60
Liberal	John Jamieson	28,042	35.10	−0.84
Greens	Steve Walker	11,645	14.57	+2.79
Christian Democrats	Bill Heggers	1,376	1.72	−0.38
Family First	Andriette du Plessis	1,145	1.43	+1.43
One Nation	Sue Bateman	988	1.24	−1.08
Socialist Alliance	Sam Wainwright	361	0.45	−0.03
Citizens Electoral Council	Paul Ellison	242	0.30	−0.80
Total formal votes		79,901	95.75	+2.60
Informal votes		3,548	4.25	−2.60
Turnout		83,449	93.75	+0.55
Two-party-preferred result
Labor	Melissa Parke	47,253	59.14	+1.38
Liberal	John Jamieson	32,648	40.86	−1.38
Labor hold		Swing	+1.38	

=== Hasluck ===
2007 Australian federal election: Hasluck
Party	Candidate	Votes	%	±%
Liberal	Stuart Henry	31,541	42.94	−2.43
Labor	Sharryn Jackson	30,471	41.48	+3.19
Greens	Jane Bremmer	6,258	8.52	+1.66
Christian Democrats	Rob Merrells	2,229	3.03	−0.07
One Nation	Bill Gaugg	1,121	1.53	−1.84
Family First	Stephen Bolt	863	1.17	+1.17
Citizens Electoral Council	Neil Vincent	687	0.94	−0.34
Liberty & Democracy	Siou Hong Chia	292	0.40	+0.40
Total formal votes		73,462	95.58	+0.56
Informal votes		3,397	4.42	−0.56
Turnout		76,859	93.35	−0.14
Two-party-preferred result
Labor	Sharryn Jackson	37,658	51.26	+3.08
Liberal	Stuart Henry	35,805	48.74	−3.08
Labor gain from Liberal		Swing	+3.08	

=== Kalgoorlie ===
2007 Australian federal election: Kalgoorlie
Party	Candidate	Votes	%	±%
Liberal	Barry Haase	31,565	48.14	+2.68
Labor	Sharon Thiel	26,653	40.65	+8.73
Greens	Robin Chapple	4,045	6.17	−0.16
One Nation	Derek Major	1,075	1.64	−0.69
Christian Democrats	Ross Patterson	962	1.47	+0.19
Family First	Ian Rose	820	1.25	+1.25
Citizens Electoral Council	Ian Burt	275	0.42	−0.07
Liberty & Democracy	Charles Dalton	176	0.28	+0.27
Total formal votes		65,571	95.93	+1.27
Informal votes		2,785	4.07	−1.27
Turnout		68,356	84.63	+1.10
Two-party-preferred result
Liberal	Barry Haase	34,474	52.58	−3.72
Labor	Sharon Thiel	31,097	47.42	+3.72
Liberal hold		Swing	−3.72	

=== Moore ===
2007 Australian federal election: Moore
Party	Candidate	Votes	%	±%
Liberal	Mal Washer	38,262	54.45	−0.89
Labor	Geraldine Burgess	22,902	32.59	+1.14
Greens	Annette Pericic-Herrmann	5,906	8.40	+1.32
Christian Democrats	Lachlan Dungey	1,556	2.21	+0.09
Family First	Douglas Croker	811	1.15	+1.15
One Nation	George Gault	719	1.02	−1.02
Citizens Electoral Council	Arthur Harvey	115	0.16	−0.12
Total formal votes		70,271	97.03	+1.37
Informal votes		2,151	2.97	−1.37
Turnout		72,422	94.35	+0.45
Two-party-preferred result
Liberal	Mal Washer	41,576	59.17	−1.66
Labor	Geraldine Burgess	28,695	40.83	+1.66
Liberal hold		Swing	−1.66	

=== O'Connor ===
2007 Australian federal election: O'Connor
Party	Candidate	Votes	%	±%
Liberal	Wilson Tuckey	34,876	45.85	−7.40
Labor	Dominic Rose	15,541	20.43	+1.86
National	Philip Gardiner	13,459	17.69	+8.25
Greens	Adrian Price	5,188	6.82	+0.09
Christian Democrats	Mac Forsyth	2,235	2.94	+0.12
One Nation	Ross Paravicini	1,214	1.60	−2.75
Independent	Michael Walton	1,128	1.48	+1.48
Family First	Stephen Carson	991	1.30	+1.30
Independent	George Giudice	986	1.30	−1.46
Independent	Darius Crowe	237	0.31	+0.31
Citizens Electoral Council	Judy Sudholz	212	0.28	−0.22
Total formal votes		76,067	95.36	+0.85
Informal votes		3,702	4.64	−0.85
Turnout		79,769	94.45	+1.19
Two-party-preferred result
Liberal	Wilson Tuckey	50,625	66.55	−3.84
Labor	Dominic Rose	25,442	33.45	+3.84
Liberal hold		Swing	−3.84	

=== Pearce ===
2007 Australian federal election: Pearce
Party	Candidate	Votes	%	±%
Liberal	Judi Moylan	43,874	51.81	−1.91
Labor	Christopher Myson	27,111	32.01	+3.96
Greens	Yvonne Dols	7,277	8.59	+0.74
Christian Democrats	Paul Mewhor	1,683	1.99	−0.99
Independent	Steve Branwhite	1,533	1.81	+1.81
One Nation	David Gunnyon	1,375	1.62	−2.12
Family First	David Bolt	1,239	1.46	+1.46
Socialist Alliance	Annolies Truman	316	0.37	−0.01
Citizens Electoral Council	Ron McLean	275	0.32	−0.21
Total formal votes		84,683	96.03	+1.33
Informal votes		3,505	3.97	−1.33
Turnout		88,188	93.30	−0.37
Two-party-preferred result
Liberal	Judi Moylan	50,022	59.07	−3.87
Labor	Christopher Myson	34,661	40.93	+3.87
Liberal hold		Swing	−3.87	

=== Perth ===
2007 Australian federal election: Perth
Party	Candidate	Votes	%	±%
Labor	Stephen Smith	36,684	46.87	+1.28
Liberal	Daniel Nikolic	28,163	35.98	−0.90
Greens	Damian Douglas-Meyer	8,320	10.63	+1.05
Christian Democrats	Paul Connelly	1,594	2.04	−0.42
Independent	Stephen Brooks	1,413	1.81	+1.81
Family First	Sharon Fairfull	838	1.07	+1.07
One Nation	Marie Edmonds	628	0.80	−1.19
Socialist Alliance	Chris Latham	464	0.59	−0.75
Citizens Electoral Council	Orm Girvan	162	0.21	−0.13
Total formal votes		78,266	95.42	+1.40
Informal votes		3,757	4.58	−1.40
Turnout		82,023	93.03	+0.10
Two-party-preferred result
Labor	Stephen Smith	46,061	58.85	+2.12
Liberal	Daniel Nikolic	32,205	41.15	−2.12
Labor hold		Swing	+2.12	

=== Stirling ===
2007 Australian federal election: Stirling
Party	Candidate	Votes	%	±%
Liberal	Michael Keenan	38,220	47.21	−0.05
Labor	Peter Tinley	32,737	40.44	+1.50
Greens	Tamara Desiatov	6,123	7.56	+0.41
Christian Democrats	Ray Moran	1,407	1.74	−0.20
Liberty & Democracy	Sam Ward	666	0.82	+0.82
What Women Want	Denise Hynd	590	0.73	+0.73
Family First	Symia Hopkinson	524	0.65	+0.65
One Nation	Alex Patrick	524	0.65	−0.82
Citizens Electoral Council	Keith Hallam	160	0.20	−0.71
Total formal votes		80,951	95.09	+1.01
Informal votes		4,178	4.91	−1.01
Turnout		85,129	93.43	+0.48
Two-party-preferred result
Liberal	Michael Keenan	41,520	51.29	−0.75
Labor	Peter Tinley	39,431	48.71	+0.75
Liberal hold		Swing	−0.75	

=== Swan ===
2007 Australian federal election: Swan
Party	Candidate	Votes	%	±%
Liberal	Steve Irons	32,183	44.28	+0.14
Labor	Kim Wilkie	29,544	40.65	+0.73
Greens	Kim Lisson	7,365	10.13	+1.84
Christian Democrats	Tasman Gilbert	1,210	1.66	−0.09
Independent	Linda Ross	656	0.90	+0.90
One Nation	Joy Harris	647	0.89	−0.89
Family First	Damon Fowler	579	0.80	−0.04
Liberty & Democracy	Mark Dixon	243	0.33	+0.33
Socialist Equality	Joe Lopez	157	0.22	+0.22
Citizens Electoral Council	Norman Gay	92	0.13	−0.16
Total formal votes		72,676	95.41	+0.87
Informal votes		3,497	4.59	−0.87
Turnout		76,173	93.22	+1.04
Two-party-preferred result
Liberal	Steve Irons	36,420	50.11	+0.19
Labor	Kim Wilkie	36,256	49.89	−0.19
Liberal gain from Labor		Swing	+0.19	

=== Tangney ===
2007 Australian federal election: Tangney
Party	Candidate	Votes	%	±%
Liberal	Dennis Jensen	39,406	50.85	−2.87
Labor	Mark Reynolds	24,832	32.04	+3.50
Greens	Christine Ivan	6,896	8.90	+1.10
Independent	Katherine Jackson	3,070	3.96	+3.96
Christian Democrats	Ka-ren Chew	1,867	2.41	−0.37
Family First	Lisa Saladine	815	1.05	+1.05
One Nation	Lloyd Boon	613	0.79	−1.66
Total formal votes		77,499	97.27	+1.71
Informal votes		2,178	2.73	−1.71
Turnout		79,677	94.56	+0.65
Two-party-preferred result
Liberal	Dennis Jensen	45,480	58.68	−3.07
Labor	Mark Reynolds	32,019	41.32	+3.07
Liberal hold		Swing	−3.07	
