= 2007 Australian federal election =

Election for the 42nd Parliament of Australia

- 24 November 2007

All 150 seats in the House of Representatives 76 seats were required for a majority in the House 40 (of the 76) seats in the Senate
- Registered: 13,646,539 ▲4.18%
- Turnout: 12,930,814 (94.72%) (▲0.40 pp)
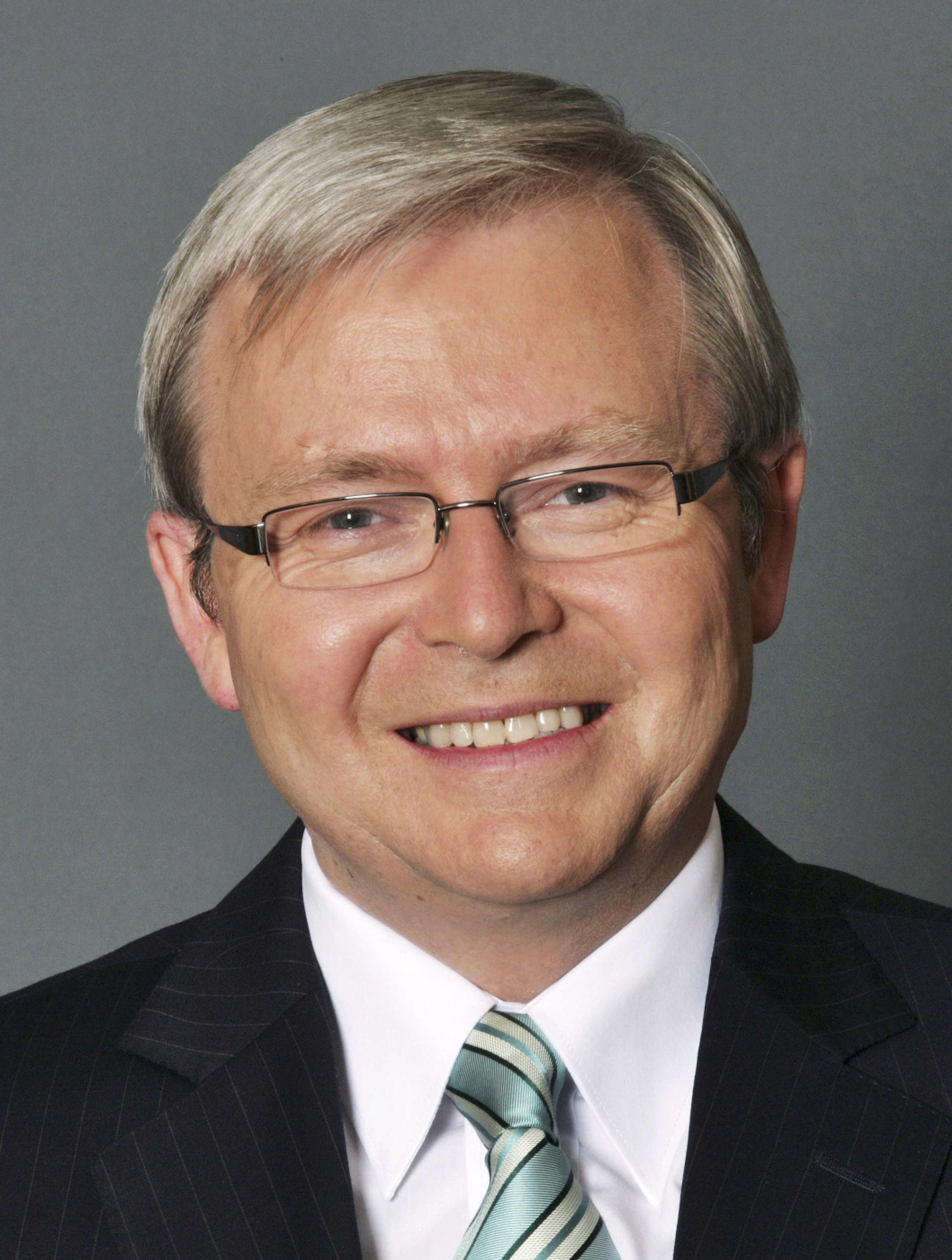

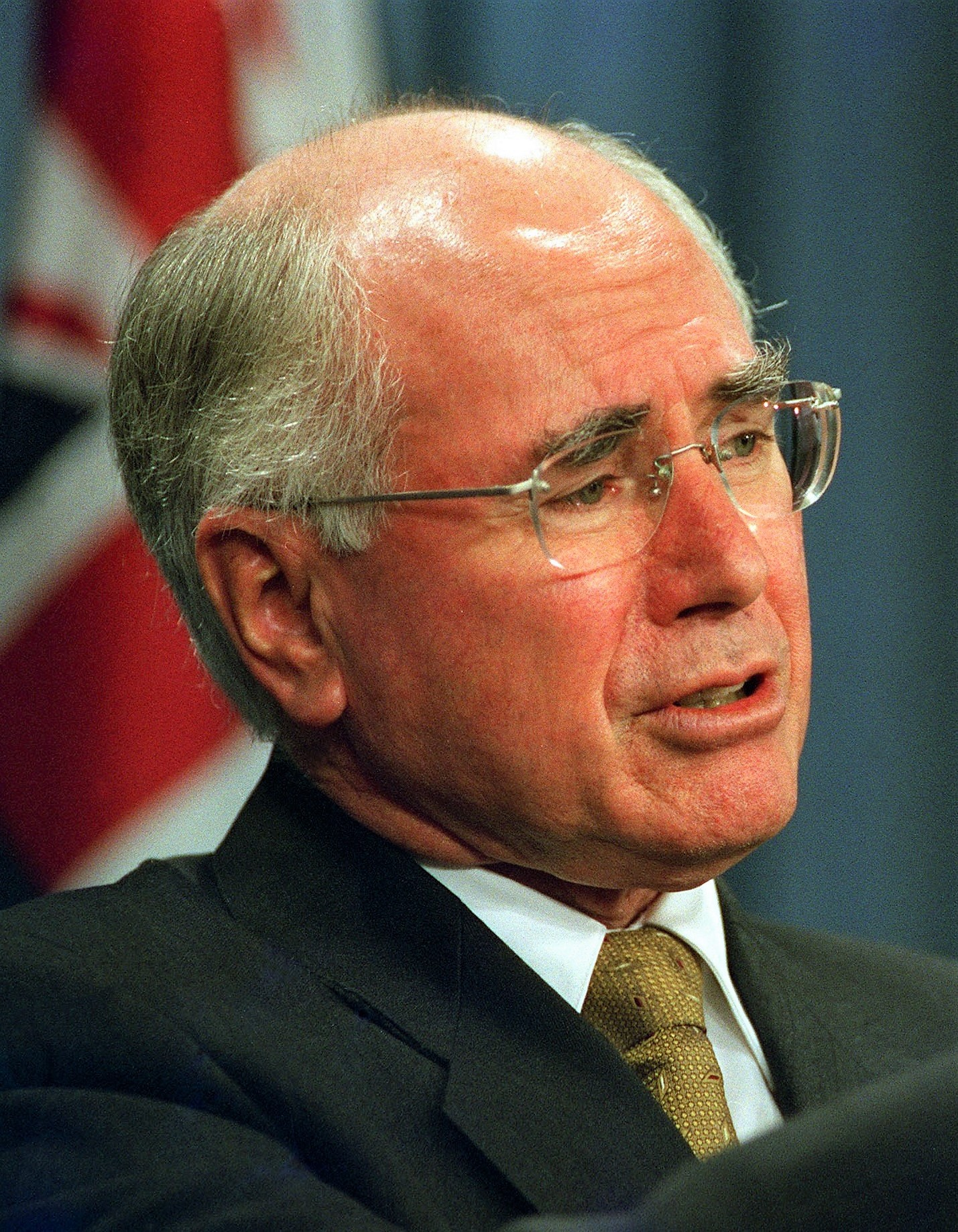
	First party	Second party
Leader	Kevin Rudd	John Howard
Party	Labor	Coalition
Leader since	4 December 2006	30 January 1995
Leader's seat	Griffith (Qld)	Bennelong (NSW) (lost seat)
Last election	60 seats	87 seats
Seats won	83	65
Seat change	▲23	▼22
Primary vote	5,388,184	5,229,024
Percentage	43.38%	42.09%
Swing	▲5.74 pp	▼4.62 pp
TPP	52.70%	47.30%
TPP swing	▲5.44 pp	▼5.44 pp
Prime Minister before election
John Howard
Liberal/National coalition
Subsequent Prime Minister
Kevin Rudd
Labor

A federal election was held in Australia on 24 November 2007. All 150 seats in the House of Representatives and 40 of the seats in the 76-member Senate were up for election. The election featured a 39-day campaign, with 13.6 million Australians enrolled to vote.

The centre-left Australian Labor Party opposition, led by Kevin Rudd and deputy leader Julia Gillard, defeated the incumbent centre-right Coalition government, led by Liberal Party leader and Prime Minister, John Howard, and Nationals leader and Deputy Prime Minister, Mark Vaile, by a landslide. The election marked the end of the 11-year-long Howard-led Liberal–National Coalition government that had been in power since the 1996 election. Howard lost his own seat, becoming the first sitting Australian Prime Minister to lose his seat in nearly 80 years. This election also marked the start of the six-year Rudd–Gillard Labor government.

Future Prime Minister Scott Morrison, future opposition leader Bill Shorten, and future Deputy Prime Minister Richard Marles entered parliament at this election. This would be the last time the Labor Party would win a majority at the federal level until 2022. This remains the most recent election in which both major parties won over 40% of first preference votes. It would also be the last time the Labor Party won 40% or more of the first preference votes. It was also the last time that Labor would be ahead of the Liberal–National Coalition in the first preference vote until 2025.

Rudd became the third Labor leader after World War II to lead the party to victory from opposition, after Gough Whitlam in 1972, Bob Hawke in 1983, and before most recently Anthony Albanese in 2022. Although the Coalition was defeated, the results in Western Australia bucked the national trend. While there was a swing against the Liberal Party and to the Labor Party, which allowed Labor to gain the seat of Hasluck from the Liberals, the Liberals managed to gain the seats of Cowan and Swan from Labor.

== Key dates ==
- Prorogation of 41st Parliament: 12 noon, 15 October
- Dissolution of House of Representatives: 12 noon, 17 October
- Issue of electoral writs: 17 October
- Close of rolls (if not currently on roll): 8 p.m., 17 October
- Close of rolls (if currently on roll and updating details): 8 p.m., 23 October
- Close of nominations: 12 noon, 1 November
- Declaration of nominations: 12 noon, 2 November
- Polling Day: 24 November
- Territory senators begin their terms: 24 November 2007
- Return of writs: 21 December
- First meeting of the 42nd Parliament: 12 February 2008
- New state senators begin their terms: 1 July 2008

Under the provisions of the Constitution, the current House of Representatives may continue for a maximum of three years from the first meeting of the House after the previous federal election. The first meeting of the 41st Parliament after the 2004 election was on 16 November 2004, hence the parliament would have expired on 15 November 2007 had it not been dissolved earlier. There must be a minimum of 33 days and a maximum of 68 days between the dissolution of the House of Representatives and the day of the election. Prime Minister Howard opted for a 39-day campaign.

The prime minister of the day chooses the election date and requests the governor-general to dissolve the House and issue the writs for the election. On 14 October, John Howard gained the agreement of the governor-general, Major-General Michael Jeffery, to dissolve the House of Representatives and hold a general election for the House and half the Senate on 24 November 2007.

During the last term of parliament before the 2007 election, the deadline for new voter enrolment was brought forward from seven working days after the issue of the writ to the same day. When the election was announced, the writ was not issued the next day, but on the following Wednesday. This kept the roll open for three days, during which 77,000 enrolment additions were processed.

== Pre-election issues ==
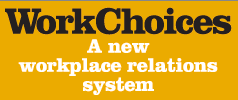
Substantial changes to Australia's industrial relations system, known as WorkChoices, were enacted by the government in December 2005 and came into effect in March 2006.

Roy Morgan polling in June 2007 reported WorkChoices was a reason for Labor party support, and a fear of union dominance and support for Coalition economic management policy as the biggest reasons behind the Coalition vote. Several big business organisations, including the Australian Industry Group, declined a request from the Prime Minister to run advertisements to counter the union-funded campaign. The share of voters concerned about industrial relations grew from 31 per cent to 53 per cent in the two years to June 2006, with around three-fifths of voters backing Labor's ability to handle the issue over the Liberal Party.

A Newspoll released in June 2006 reported health and Medicare were the most important issue for voters; 83 per cent of respondents rated it "very important". Other key issues included education (79 per cent), the economy (67 per cent), the environment (60 per cent) and national security (60 per cent). Taxation and interest rates, key issues in previous campaigns, were rated very important by 54 per cent and 51 per cent respectively. Immigration, a key issue in 2001, scored 43 per cent. The poll showed that voters considered Labor marginally better-placed to handle health and education, and gave the government strong backing on the economy and national security.

Kevin Rudd promised Labor would introduce a greenhouse gas emission reduction target of 60 per cent by 2050, ratify the Kyoto Protocol and introduce a mandatory renewable energy target (MRET) of 20 per cent by 2020. The Howard government reiterated their position of not ratifying the Kyoto protocol, setting "voluntary aspirational emission reduction targets" and introducing a carbon emissions trading scheme by 2012.

Labor pledged a $4.7 billion fibre-to-the-node broadband network.

Liberal Party electoral advertising shown on free-to-air and pay TV in 2004.

On 7 June in a speech promoting the government's handling of the economy, Treasurer Peter Costello recalled the learner driver slogan of the 2004 election: "This [the economy] is like a highly engineered racing car and I tell you what, I wouldn't be putting an L-plate driver in the cockpit at the moment". August 2007 saw, for the first time during an election campaign, a 0.25-point interest-rate rise to 6.5 per cent by the Reserve Bank, the sixth rise since the last election in 2004. Labor used the news to argue that the Coalition could not be trusted to keep interest rates low, while Costello argued that interest rates would be higher under Labor. In November 2007 interest rates were raised for the sixth time since the 2004 election, to a 10-year high of 6.75 per cent. In response to Labor criticism of the government on the rate rises, Howard stated in August 2007 "[Rudd] can scour every transcript, and I will make them available, of every interview that I gave during that election campaign and he will find no such commitment." In late September, Sudanese Australian Liep Gony was murdered by two white assailants. Initial off-the-record statements by police officers falsely attributed the murder to gang violence, leading to a press and political storm around so-called African gangs. During this period, Immigration Minister Kevin Andrews criticised Sudanese Australians on various occasions for "not fitting in" and suggested they were disposed towards "un-Australian" violence. As a result of this discourse, the government decided to cut the percentage of refugee visas given to Africans from 70% to 30%.

The Queensland Labor Premier, Anna Bligh, described Andrews' criticism of Sudanese as "disturbing". She said: "It has been a long time since I have heard such a pure form of racism out of the mouth of any Australian politician." Labor politician Tony Burke branded Andrews' decision as "incompetent". However, Andrew's actions were applauded by the former One Nation politician, Pauline Hanson. Andrews was accused of helping to fuel assaults of Sudanese. During the controversy one criticism was that Andrews justified his decision based on "concerns raised by the community", however no official report or inquest has been tendered, leading to the conclusion that any 'concerns' were both unofficial, undocumented and possibly belonging to a racially intolerant minority. Andrews defended the system of having refugee quotas against the opinion expressed that intakes of refugees should be variated on the basis of global needs ." In October 2007, Howard "admitted breaking a promise to keep interest rates at record lows". During the 2004 campaign, Howard was also cited as giving the same promise, personally, on radio. Inflation figures released on 24 October indicated underlying inflation was higher than expected, which resulted in seven of eight financial companies believing there will be an interest rate rise when the reserve bank met in the middle of November, the first during an election campaign.

Rudd advocated four-year fixed terms for federal parliaments if elected. Howard supported four-year terms but opposed fixed election dates. Any change would require approval by referendum. In mid-October, Howard said that if re-elected, the government would hold a referendum on the inclusion a statement of reconciliation in the preamble of the constitution.

== Election campaign ==
=== Week 1 ===
On 14 October, Howard announced a 24 November election. The Coalition had been trailing Labor in the polls since 2006, and most pundits predicted that Howard would not be re-elected. ABC Online election analyst Antony Green noted the Coalition's numbers were similar to what Labor had polled before losing power in 1996.

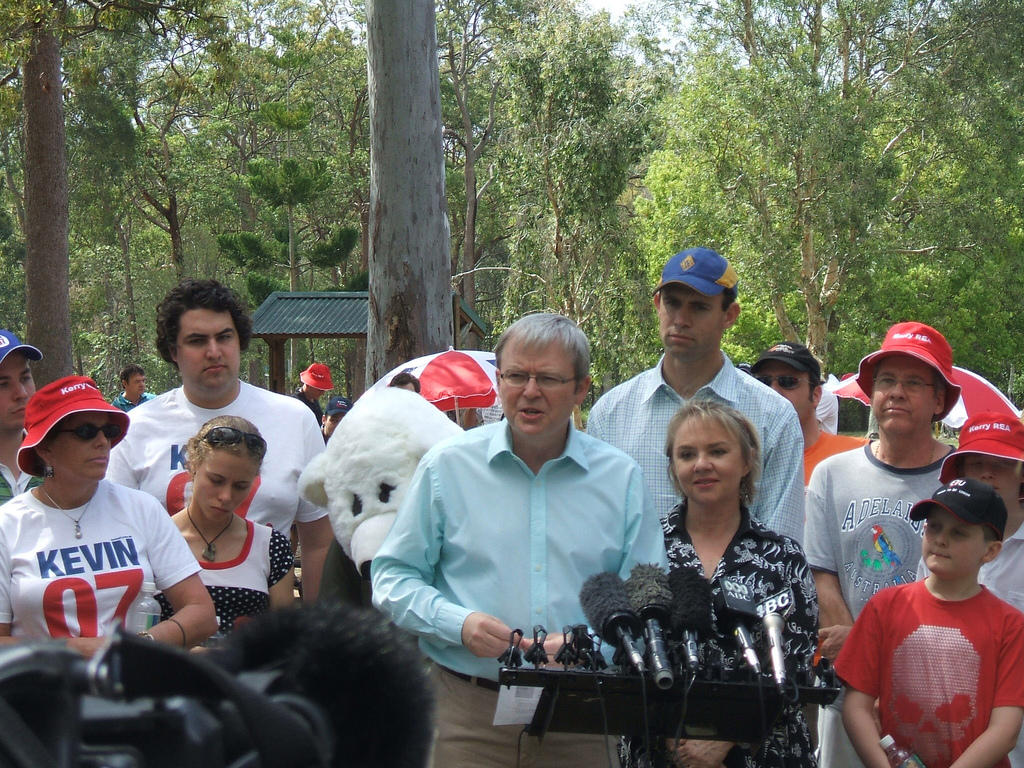
Kevin Rudd campaigning with Labor candidate Kerry Rea in Bonner on 21 September 2007.

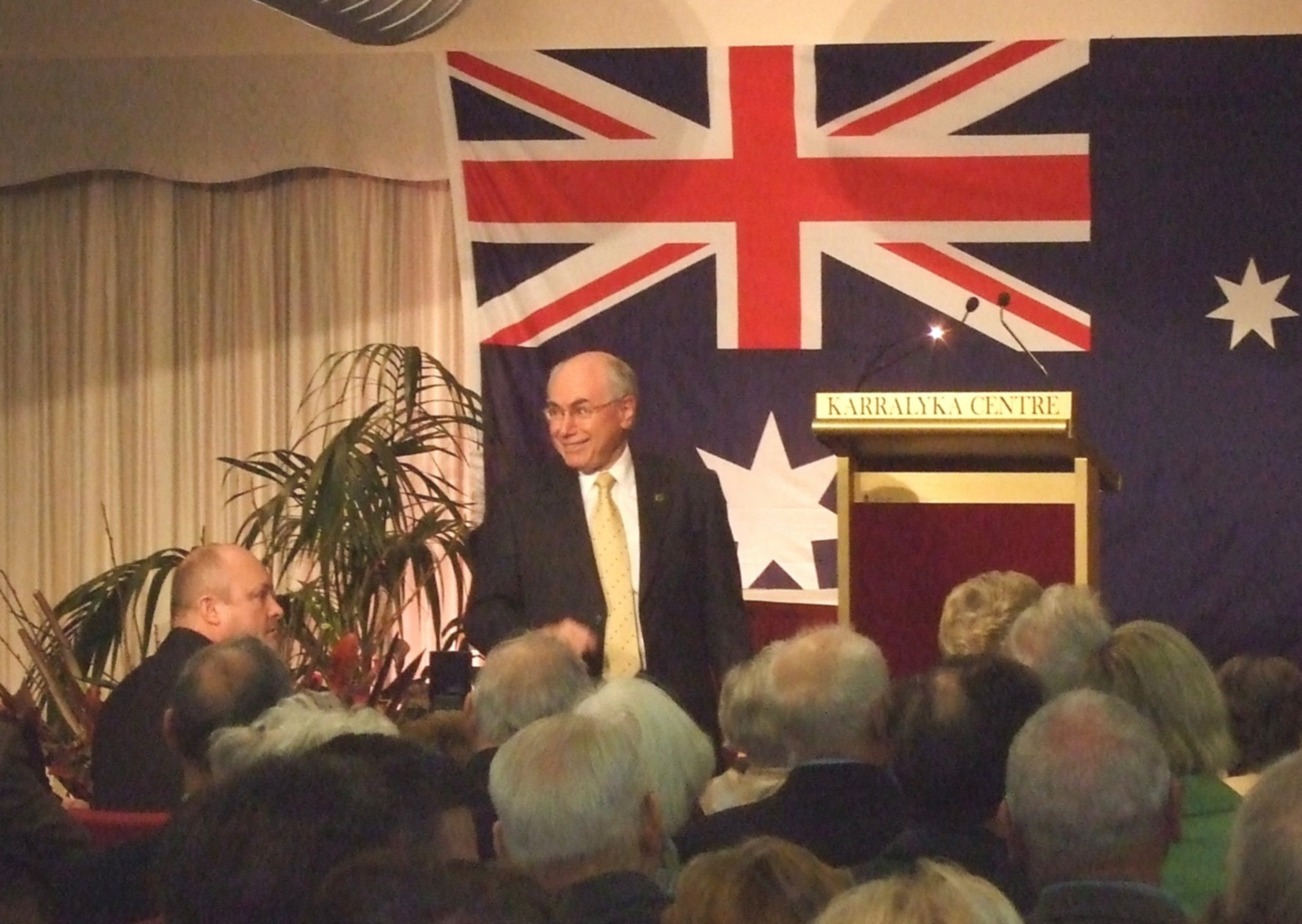
John Howard meeting Maroondah residents, 31 August 2007

Howard's theme concentrated on leadership, stating that the nation "does not need new leadership, it does not need old leadership. It needs the right leadership" He said his government would strive to achieve full employment, which he argued was less likely under Kevin Rudd. In response, Rudd also concentrated on leadership, outlining his case for "new leadership". He argued that the government had 'lost touch' with the electorate, and that the Labor Party was best suited to deal with challenges that lie ahead.

A Galaxy poll showed a Labor 53–47 per cent Coalition two-party-preferred result, with a 2 per cent gap on primaries, and ACNielsen polling reported a 2 per cent swing to the Coalition, reducing Labor's lead to 54–46. Rudd dropped 5 per cent as preferred prime minister. A Newspoll sampling 1,700 voters taken over the weekend prior to the leaders' debate reported a swing to Labor, increasing their two-party-preferred lead to 58 per cent, a rise of 2 points. Labor's primary vote increased 3 points to 51 per cent, and the Liberals decreased by 2 points to 34 per cent. Rudd extended his lead by 2 points to 50 per cent, with Howard down by 2 points to 37 per cent.

On the first full day of the campaign, Howard and Costello announced a 'major restructuring of the income tax system' with tax cuts worth $35 billion over three years and a tax cut "goal" for the next five years. A few days later, Rudd released his policy which supported the reform measures, however offered education and health tax rebates instead of immediate cuts to the top rate as proposed by the Liberal Party, with a slower progression for the top rate.

The Liberals slogan, "go for growth" was launched after announcing the largest tax cut in Australian history. Media and political commentators questioned the suitability of the slogan in the context of rising inflation and interest rates.

During the latter part of the week union influence over the ALP was questioned after the launch of the Liberal party's first campaign ads. Labor responded with commercials attacking the Liberals' campaign as 'smears', which was disputed by John Howard. One of the Liberal Party election commercials was corrected after it incorrectly said Wayne Swan and Craig Emerson had previously been union officials.

==== Leaders' debate ====
A debate between the Leader of the Opposition and the Prime Minister, under the moderation of the National Press Club, was shown live on ABC TV, the Nine Network, and Sky News Australia at 7.30 pm on 21 October. Rudd had called for a minimum of three debates between himself and Howard, while Howard, who had been rated poorly by studio audiences at past leadership debates, pressed for a single debate. A total of 2.4 million Australians watched the event, with Nine averaging 1.42 million, the ABC averaging 907,000, and Sky News averaging 62,000. The last election debate in 2004 was watched by 1.77 million on Nine and the ABC, while in 2001, average audiences on Nine, Seven and the ABC totalled 2.44 million. David Speers, Sky News's political editor, moderated the debate which was held in the Great Hall of Parliament House. The debate audience was 400, with the Coalition and Labor each selecting 200.

Kevin Rudd argued that the Liberal Party was being influenced by the H. R. Nicholls Society to make further reforms to industrial relations, citing Nick Minchin's speech at the Society's 2008 conference where he told the audience that the Coalition "knew its reform to WorkChoices were not popular but the process of change must continue", and that "there is still a long way to go... awards, the IR commission, all the rest of it..." In response to the Liberal Party message that 70 per cent of Labor's front bench was made up of former union officials, Rudd said 70 per cent of Liberal Party ministers were either lawyers or former Liberal Party staffers. On the same day, Peter Costello admitted when questioned that the 70 per cent figure was in reference to union members rather than union officials.

Rudd said that Howard had "no plan for the future" on tackling climate change. Howard said that a Coalition government would establish a climate change fund after 2011, which would be financed by carbon offsets.

The Nine Network, which broadcast the debate as an extended edition of 60 Minutes, used 'the Worm' in its broadcast despite prior objections from the Liberal Party and action from the National Press Club to cease its video feed. As a result, the Nine Network's feed was cut part way into the broadcast, which Nine then replaced with Sky News's coverage. The Nine television network's live audience, via the Worm's average, scored the debate 65 to 29 in Rudd's favour, with 6 per cent remaining undecided. Both sides, however, claimed victory. Nine had a separate group of 80 it said were 'swinging' voters (chosen by McNair Research) in its studio to control 'the Worm'. Steps were taken to ensure equal numbers so as not to taint the Worm. At one point, Peter Costello was asked to cease interjecting.

=== Week 2 ===
Figures released on the Tuesday, showed a stronger than expected underlying rate of inflation of 3 per cent. Treasurer Peter Costello argued against an increase in interest rates, saying the Reserve Bank should concentrate on the headline consumer price index (CPI) inflation rate which rose of 1.9 per cent for the period.

Controversy arose over the Coalition's climate change policy, with The Financial Review citing "government sources" who claimed Turnbull told Cabinet six weeks ago it should sign the Kyoto Protocol. Neither Howard nor Turnbull denied the story. The story said that "internal critics" are claiming Turnbull is "selfishly positioning himself for a Coalition defeat" and a "possible post-poll leadership battle with Treasurer Peter Costello". The story led to claims of major splits in Cabinet.

Labor also suffered from mixed messages. Kevin Rudd was compelled to clarify Labor policy on climate change after an interview in which Peter Garrett suggested Labor would sign up to the post-Kyoto agreement at 2012 even if carbon-emitting developing countries did not. Rudd's comments, which he described as having "always been [Labor's] position", saw Labor's policy move closer to Liberal policy, insofar as Labor would ratify the agreement only after persuading all major carbon emitters, developing and developed, to ratify. Rudd also committed Labor to a target of a 20 per cent reduction in emissions by 2020, a 5-point increase on the Liberal target, assisted by the use of renewable energy, but without the use of coal pollution mitigation, arguing that it would ultimately be a benefit, not a detriment to the economy.

=== Week 3 ===
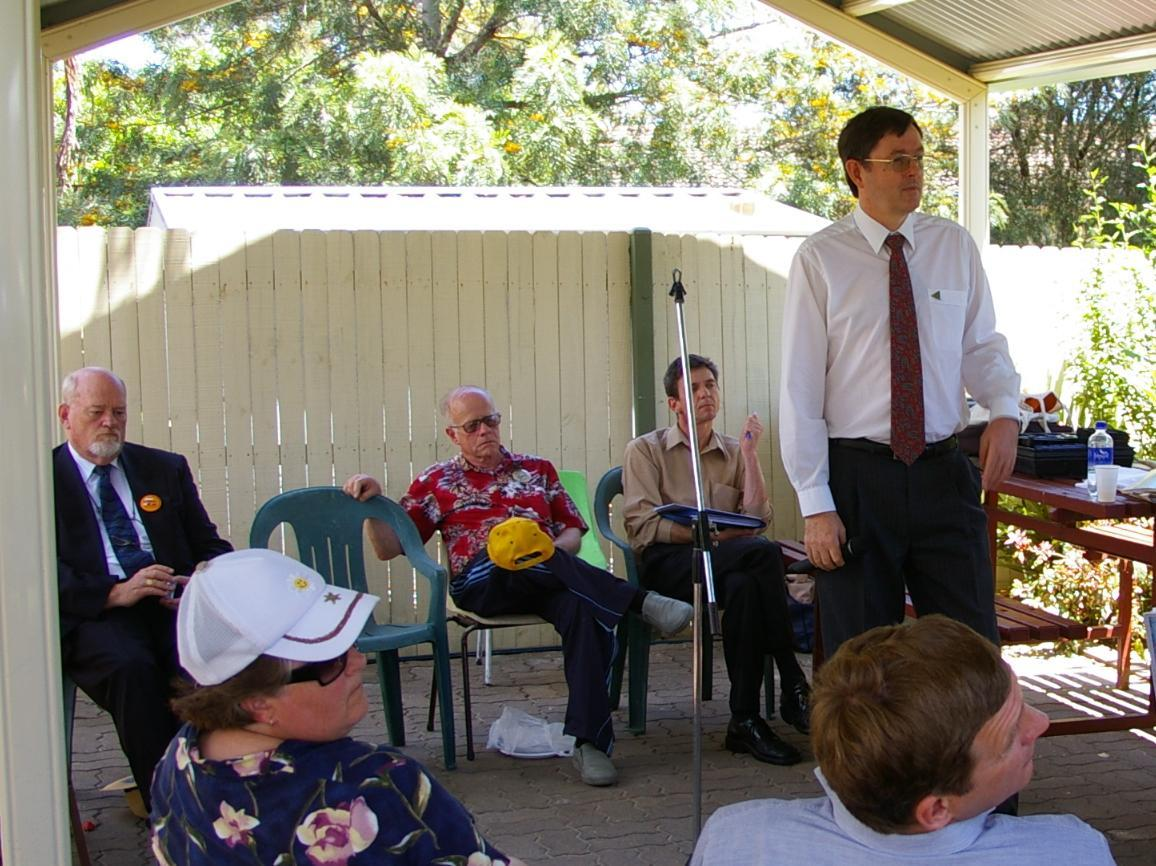
Candidates address electors two weeks before polling day in the Division of Chifley.

John Howard said the Coalition would not match Labor's promise of 20 per cent renewable energy target. Howard claimed Labor's policy "imposes too many additional costs to industry". Peter Garrett replied that lack of government action has cost jobs. ABC Radio reported that Howard had rejected a 2005 recommendation for higher renewable energy targets by his Environment Minister, but Howard declined to confirm or deny the claim.

The Coalition announced a promise to open 50 new emergency medical centres on Australia if re-elected. Adding to the campaign trend of both major parties criticising their opponent for plagiarism and "me-tooism", Labor responded that the government had copied its policy.

Peter Garrett was criticised by the Coalition when radio announcer Steve Price revealed Garrett had said to TV presenter Richard Wilkins that, "once we get in we'll just change it all" in reference to copying Coalition policies. Garrett said the comment was made during a "short, jocular and casual" conversation and Wilkins supported Garrett's response, saying that it was a "light-hearted throwaway line".

Tim Costello, director of World Vision Australia and Peter Costello's brother, criticised Australia's ranking of 19th out of 22 OECD countries for provision of overseas aid, and for government unwillingness to increase its policy of 0.35 per cent of national GDP to match Labor's commitment of 0.5 per cent. Howard said his party planned to lift the rate to 3.5 per cent.

Commentators pronounced Peter Costello and Wayne Swan's debate on 30 October as ending in a draw. Costello focused mainly on the government's past record, advocating the need for Australia to build into the future, while Swan said Labor were interested in "investing in people". Howard said he believed Costello "creamed" his opponent, while Rudd said Swan did a "fantastic job".

Liberal Tony Abbott and Labor's Nicola Roxon debated health at the National Press Club on ABC television. Abbott's character and ministerial capacity were questioned by Roxon for his comments about terminally ill asbestos campaigner Bernie Banton and for arriving 35 minutes late to debate. At the end of the debate, Roxon suggested to Abbott that he "could have arrived on time" if he had "really wanted to", to which Abbott replied "bullshit". Former Liberal campaign strategist Sue Cato said "you just don't run late for things like that". Abbott apologised to Banton but not to Roxon.

=== Week 4 ===
On 10 November, the Australian Democrats held their campaign launch in Melbourne under the banner of Bring Back Balance, a reference to their central campaign theme of preventing the government from regaining absolute control of the Senate.

The Reserve Bank of Australia adjusted interest rates upwards by another 0.25 per cent, the sixth rise since the last election, to a 10-year high of 6.75 per cent, and the first time the Bank had been changed rates during an election campaign. The Coalition said that only the current government had the proper experienced team to manage the economy in future, less prosperous years. Costello argued that the inflationary reasons for the rate rise were "outside the control of a Government". In response, Labor accused the Coalition of having "hauled up the white flag in the fight against inflation", saying that they had backflipped from their past statements that they could keep interest rates low. Howard stated that he was sorry for the negative consequences for and burden on Australian borrowers, but subsequently denied that this constituted an apology for the rate rise itself.

On 7 November, Workplace Relations Minister Joe Hockey and Labor's Julia Gillard debated industrial relations including WorkChoices at the National Press Club in Canberra. Hockey argued that Labor's policy to drop Workchoices was Australia's biggest threat to inflation. On 8 November, Environment Minister Malcolm Turnbull and opposition spokesman Peter Garrett debated environment issues at the National Press Club in Canberra. Garrett criticised the government's record on climate change to which Turnbull responded that Garrett's current claims betray his previous career as a political activist.

=== Week 5 ===
Both major parties had their official campaign launches in Brisbane, Queensland; the Liberal Party on Monday 12 November and Labor on Wednesday 14 November. At their launch, the Coalition pledged a rebate for education costs, including private school fees, of all Australian children, totalling $9.4 billion. Under the plan, primary school students would have been eligible for $400, while secondary-school students would have been eligible for $800. Tax cuts worth $1.6 billion over four years were proposed to encourage people to save for first homes, and extra funding of $652 million for child care and $158 million to support carers was promised.

The Labor Party promised to spend only a quarter of the $9.4 billion promised by the Coalition, saying it would have a smaller impact on inflation. It accused the Howard government of being "irresponsible". In addition to previous education funding announcements, Rudd promised Labor would provide an additional 65,000 apprenticeships, migrate all schools to new high speed broadband, and provide all year 9–12 students with access to their own computer. A doubling of the number of undergraduate and postgraduate scholarships available at a tertiary level was announced, and the party re-iterating its view on climate change and WorkChoices.

The Labor Party released footage on Thursday 15 November to Lateline, showing Tony Abbott addressing a room of people, stating "I accept that certain protections, in inverted commas, are not what they were" in reference to WorkChoices legislation. Referring to award structures, Abbott said in the same footage: "I accept that that has largely gone. I accept that." When questioned, Abbott said he stood by the comments that WorkChoices means "certain protections" are not what they used to be, but denied conceding workers had lost protections. He said the video released by Labor was a "cut-and-paste job".

A report by the National Audit Office found that the Coalition had been interfering in the $328 million regional grants program, with a bias toward their marginal seats, where projects under the Regional Partnerships Program were apparently approved without proper assessment, or none at all, and that there was an increase in approvals prior to the 2004 election.

=== Week 6 ===
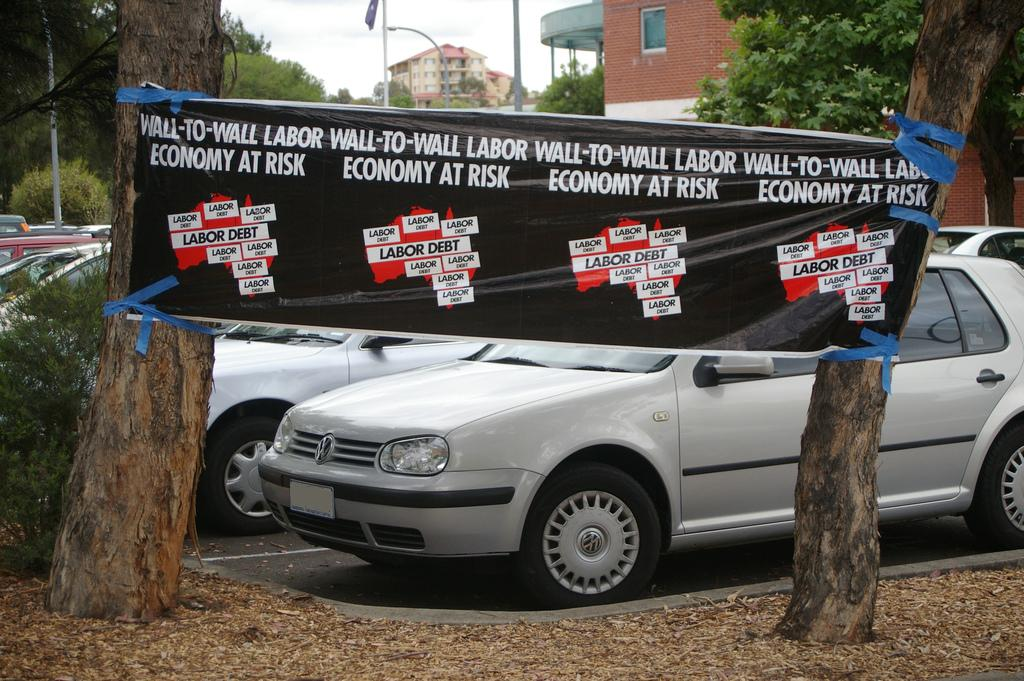
Liberal Party banners at polling booths on election day.

Newspoll stated Labor's two-party-preferred level was down one point to 54 per cent. Former Liberal Party campaign director Lynton Crosby said that the Coalition was "closing in on Labor" in the final week and could "still win a tight election" on a campaign of defending marginal seats, declaring a win still possible on 48.5 per cent of the two-party-preferred vote.

On 20 November, John Howard defended the government's advertising spending in the months prior to the campaign, paid for with public money. The advertising, which covered topics including the controversial "Workchoices", cost $360 million over approximately 18 months. An article in the 20 November issue of the Herald Sun suggested spending could have been up to $500 million, though this took a broader view of what was included in that sum. Howard was criticised for not revealing documents written by his department about further changes to industrial relations laws in addition to WorkChoices legislation. In response, the government said the proposals had been cancelled, and that WorkChoices would not be expanded upon. The Seven Network failed in attempt to access the documents under Freedom of Information.

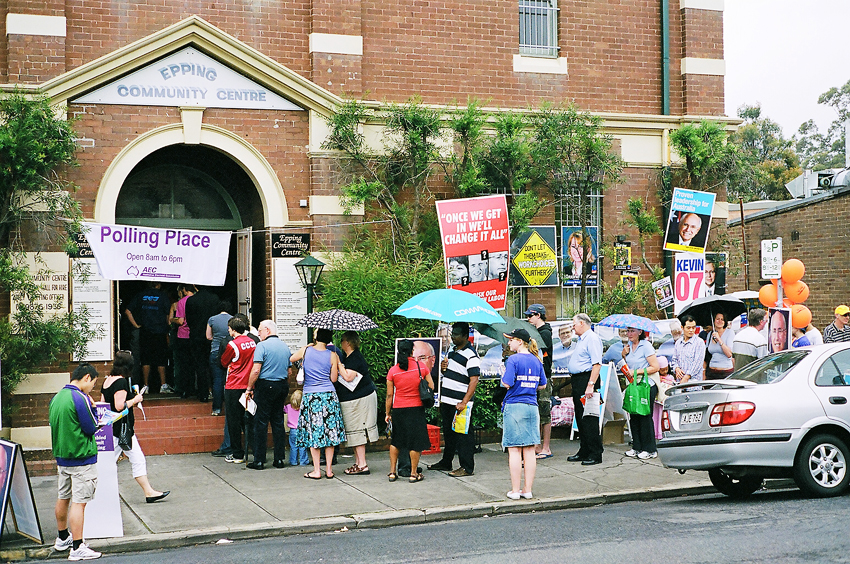
Polling at Epping, New South Wales, within John Howard's Electorate

Nationals Senator Barnaby Joyce said that the possibility of his crossing the floor to support Labor's amendments to WorkChoices remained open, and that he would judge all legislation on its merits, for which he was criticised by Nationals leader Mark Vaile.

On 21 November, three days before the election, fake pamphlets were distributed in the electorate of Lindsay, which purported to be from an Islamic group. The group was non-existent and the pamphlets thanked the Labor Party for supporting the Bali bombers and encouraged people to vote Labor. Those involved included a member of the Liberals' state executive, Jeff Egan; Gary Clark, husband of retiring MP Jackie Kelly; and Greg Chijoff, the husband of Lindsay candidate Karen Chijoff. Kelly said the incident was a "Chaser-style of prank." John Howard condemned the pamphlet. Egan and Greg Chijoff were immediately expelled from the Liberal Party a day before John Howard's address to the Australian Press Club; although, Egan denied any wrongdoing. After the election Greg Chijoff, Clark and a third man were fined over the scandal, as the pamphlet were considered electoral material that required an authorisation disclosure statement. It also lead to a breakdown in the Chijoff marriage.

Citing a clause of the Constitution that states parliamentarians are not permitted to hold an "office of profit under the crown", government frontbencher Andrew Robb said that up to 13 Labor candidates standing in the election may be ineligible for nomination. According to Robb, a "search of public records" indicated that the 13 candidates may have still been employed by government agencies, boards or offices, and that the Liberal Party may consider legal challenges to their election. According to Labor Senator Penny Wong, all Labor's candidates were eligible to stand, and that the Liberals had obtained the information from outdated websites.

Election day was Saturday 24 November.

== Television coverage ==
Election night was covered extensively by three of the Australian free-to-air networks, from the National Tally Room: ABC Television, the Nine Network and the Seven Network. Network Ten and SBS Television included brief updates and news bulletins through the night, but not to the other networks' extent. Sky News offered extensive coverage on Pay TV.

- Seven went with a new election coverage team for 2007, led by Sunrise hosts David Koch and Melissa Doyle, who were assisted by journalist Mark Riley and game show host Andrew O'Keefe. Special guests included Liberal politicians Joe Hockey, Jackie Kelly, Andrew Robb and former Victorian Premier Jeff Kennett, Labor politicians Tanya Plibersek, Mark Arbib and former Queensland Premier Peter Beattie, and National politician Barnaby Joyce. The broadcast was watched by 967,000 viewers, coming second after the ABC.
- Nine's coverage was hosted by journalist Ray Martin and political editor Laurie Oakes. Special guests included Labor politicians Senator Robert Ray and Shadow Treasurer Wayne Swan, Liberals Michael Kroger and Communications Minister Helen Coonan. The broadcast was watched by 763,000 people and came third among the free-to-air networks doing full election count coverage.
- The ABC's coverage was hosted by Kerry O'Brien, Tony Jones and Antony Green. Special guests included Senator Nick Minchin (Finance Minister), representing the Coalition, and Julia Gillard (Deputy Labor Leader). The ABC provided live crosses to key electorates around Australia. The broadcast was watched by 1,112,000 viewers and was the most watched election coverage.
- Sky News Australia's coverage was hosted by David Speers in Sydney with Helen Dalley at the tally room in Canberra. Guests included former prime minister Bob Hawke, former Labor Leader Kim Beazley, former Liberal Leader John Hewson, and current members in Parliament, including Brendan Nelson and Concetta Fierravanti-Wells from the Liberal Party, Natasha Stott Despoja from the Democrats, Christine Milne from The Greens and Stephen Conroy and Tony Burke from the Labor Party. Party strategists Bruce Hawker and Lynton Crosby analysed the figures from the Sky News Centre in Sydney.
- Ten News covered the results in a special news bulletin airing about 10:30 pm. Anchored by Bill Woods and Paul Bongiorno in Canberra, and featuring Sandra Sully with Kevin Rudd in Brisbane, Deborah Knight with John Howard in Sydney, and Helen Kapalos with Peter Costello in Victoria. The network had heavily advertised that they would be airing The Empire Strikes Back as an alternative to the coverage on the other networks.
- SBS aired a results bulletin at 9:30 pm, anchored by Stan Grant alongside Canberra correspondent Karen Middleton.

== Opinion polling ==
Two party preferred polling since the previous election by Newspoll 1993–2007 (as published in The Australian newspaper), ACNielsen 1996–2007 (as published in Fairfax newspapers), Roy Morgan 1996–2007 and Galaxy 2004–2007.

Preferred-prime-minister polling since the previous election by Newspoll 1987–2007 (as published in The Australian newspaper) and ACNielsen 1996–2007 (as published in Fairfax newspapers).

Roy Morgan, Newspoll, ACNeilsen and Galaxy timegraph polling showed Labor leading the Coalition in opinion polling from mid-2006 onward. On several key questions, Labor increased its lead after Rudd assumed the Labor leadership from Kim Beazley, at which point Rudd also assumed the lead as preferred prime minister. While Labor was ahead in opinion polling, Howard had led Beazley on this question by a wide margin.

According to Australian political analyst Adam Carr, WorkChoices was one of five key reasons for "...a change of heart by the decisive sectors of the electorate". The new industrial relations program, Carr said, angered the "Howard battlers" – the traditional Labor voters who had supported Howard for most of the last 11 years – because they saw it as a direct attack on their livelihood.

ACNielsen polling in March 2007 had Rudd's personal approval rating at 67 per cent, which made him the most popular opposition leader in the poll's 35-year history, with Newspoll (News Limited) 2PP polling the highest in its history at 61%. The largest 2PP election result for the ALP in its history was at the 1943 election on an estimate of 58.2 per cent.

A weighted collaboration of all polling since Rudd assumed the ALP leadership shows an average Labor 2PP figure of 57 per cent compared with the Coalition's 43 per cent, and Rudd's consistent outpolling of Howard as preferred prime minister, something not achieved under previous leaders Mark Latham, Kim Beazley or Simon Crean.

By the time the writs were issued, the Coalition was well behind Labor in opinion polling, which election analyst Antony Green believed to show Labor winning government "in a canter". According to Green, this was a nearly exact reversal of the run-up to the 1996 election. The Coalition was running ahead of Labor in two-party opinion polling for much of 1995 and 1996, however the mantle of preferred prime minister regularly switched between Howard and Paul Keating.

Possums Pollytics, an anonymous weblog, stated that due to the uneven nature of the swings, where safe Liberal seats were swinging up to 14.6 per cent with safe Labor seats swinging around only 4.1 points, the Labor party stood to potentially end up with a maximum of 106 of the 151 lower house seats.

Polling consistently showed that the economy and national security were the Coalition's strong areas. In August 2007 an Ipsos poll showed 39 per cent of voters thought Labor was a better economic manager, compared to 36 per cent for the Coalition, with 25 per cent undecided.

The morning of the election announcement, a special Sun-Herald Taverner survey of 979 people across New South Wales and Victoria had been released, indicating a Labor 2PP of 59 per cent, with the 18- to 29-year-old category voting at 72 per cent. The fortnightly Newspoll was released the day after the election was called, showing the 2PP remaining steady at Labor 56–44 Liberal. Howard increased his Preferred PM rating up one per cent to 39 per cent, while Rudd increased his rating up one per cent to 48 per cent. On the day after the election was called, Centrebet had odds of 1.47 on Labor, with 2.70 on the Coalition. Halfway through the campaign, with no overall change in the polls, saw Centrebet odds for Labor shorten to 1.29, with the Liberals on 3.60. Centrebet odds two days out from the election were at 1.22 for Labor, with 4.35 for the Coalition.

Newspoll a week out from the election of 3,600 voters in 18 of the Coalition's most marginal seats revealed an ALP 54–46 Coalition 2PP, a swing to Labor of 6–9 per cent. A uniform swing would see 18–25 seats fall to Labor, The Australian said.

Former Labor number-cruncher Graham Richardson, who news.com.au (News Limited) claims to have correctly picked the winner of every election for the past three decades, tipped Kevin Rudd and Labor to win with a 6–7 per cent two-party-preferred, 20-seat swing.

The election-eve Newspoll and Galaxy poll reported the ALP on a 2PP of 52 per cent, Roy Morgan on 53.5 per cent, with ACNielsen on 57 per cent. Seven News reported that TAB had updated their odds for the election, with Labor having safe odds of $1.20 and the Coalition an outside chance on $4.60.

Sky News-Channel 7-Auspoll exit polls on election day of 2,787 voters in the 31 most marginal seats suggested a 53 per cent two-party preferred figure to Labor, 53 per cent to Labor in Bennelong, and 58 per cent to Labor in Eden-Monaro. Key issue questions swung Labor's way.

== Newspaper endorsements ==
Newspaper	Publisher	Endorsement
The Advertiser	News Limited	Liberal
The Age	Fairfax Media	No endorsement
The Australian	News Limited	Labor
The Australian Financial Review	Fairfax Media	Liberal
The Canberra Times	Fairfax Media	Labor
The Courier-Mail	News Limited	Labor
The Daily Telegraph	News Limited	Labor
The Examiner	Fairfax Regional Media	Liberal
The Herald Sun	News Limited	Liberal
The Mercury	News Limited	Labor
Northern Territory News	News Limited	Labor
The Sydney Morning Herald	Fairfax Media	Labor

== Results ==
Results of the election in the House

Results of the election in the Senate

=== House of Representatives ===
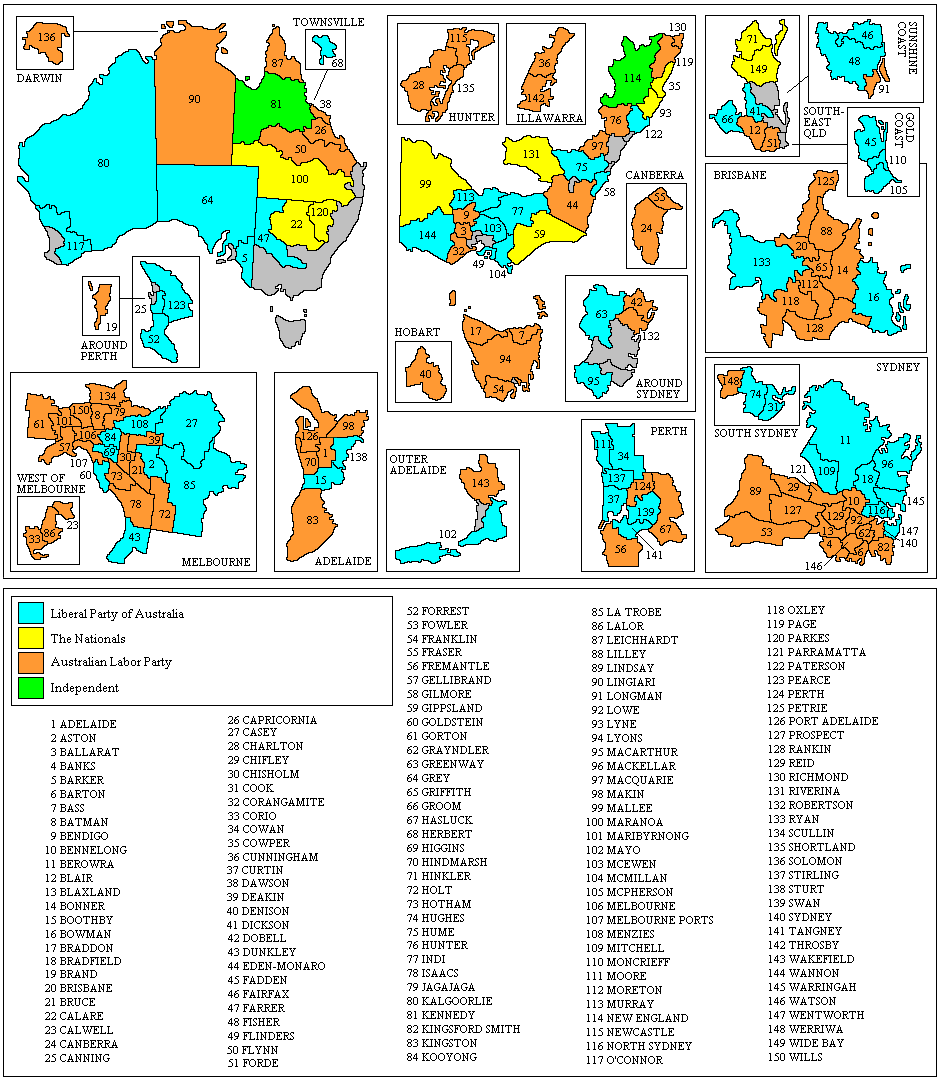
Electoral divisions: Australia

House of Reps (IRV) — Turnout 94.76% (CV) — Informal 3.95%
Party	Votes	%	Swing	Seats	Change
Labor	5,388,147	43.38	+5.74	83	▲23
Liberal	4,506,236	36.28	–4.19	55	▼19
National	682,424	5.49	–0.40	10	▼2
Country Liberal	40,298	0.32	–0.02	0	▼1
Liberal–National coalition	5,228,958	42.09	−4.61	65	▼22
Greens	967,781	7.79	+0.60		
Family First	246,792	1.99	–0.02		
Christian Democrats	104,705	0.84	+0.22		
Democrats	89,810	0.72	–0.51		
Others	393,679	3.18	−1.03	2	▼1
Total	12,419,863			150	
Two-party-preferred vote
Labor	6,545,759	52.70	+5.44	83	▲23
Liberal/National coalition	5,874,104	47.30	–5.44	65	▼22
Invalid/blank votes	510,951	3.95	−1.23		
Registered voters/turnout	13,646,539	94.72			
Source: Commonwealth Election 2007

Popular vote
Labor	43.38%
Liberal	36.28%
Greens	7.79%
National	5.49%
Family First	1.99%
Christian Democrats	0.84%
Democrats	0.72%
CLP	0.32%
Other	3.18%

Two-party-preferred vote
Labor	52.70%
Coalition	47.30%

Parliament seats
Labor	55.33%
Coalition	43.33%
Independents	1.33%

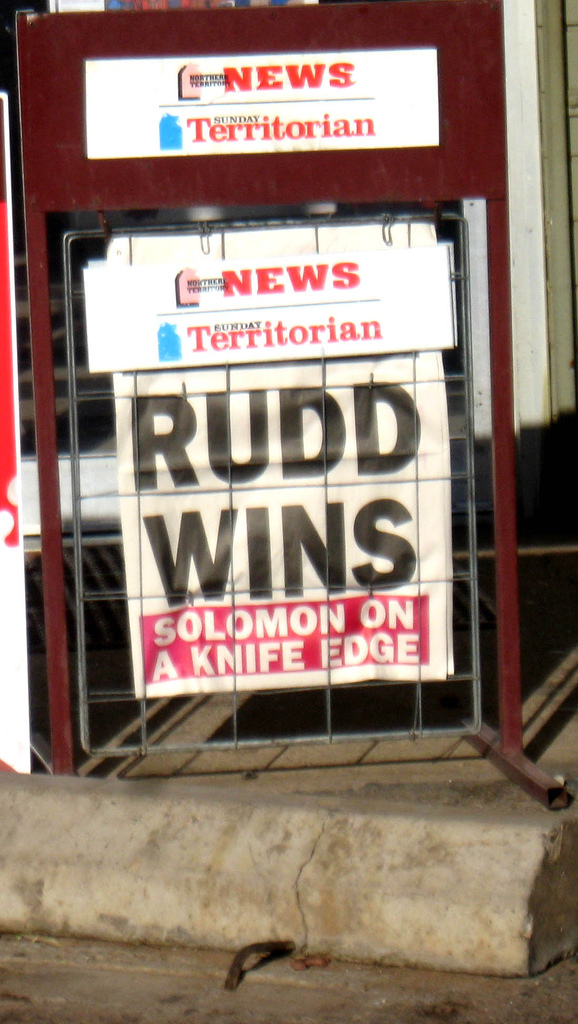
The front page of the Sunday Territorian the day after the election, announcing Rudd's win

At 8.00 pm, the first personality to call the election was former Labor Prime Minister Bob Hawke on Sky News. At 10.29 pm AEST, approximately two hours after the last polls in Western Australia closed, Liberal deputy leader Peter Costello conceded that the Coalition had lost government. At 10.36 pm, John Howard delivered a speech at the Sofitel Sydney Wentworth to concede defeat. At 11.05 pm, Kevin Rudd delivered his victory speech.

Labor won 83 of the 150 seats in the incoming House of Representatives. This represented a 23-seat swing to Labor. The Liberals won 55 while the Nationals won 10, with two seats retained by Independents. Labor finished with a 52.70 per cent two-party-preferred vote, a 5.44-point swing from 2004. On preferences, 79.7 per cent of Green votes flowed to Labor, 60.3 per cent of Family First votes flowed to the Coalition, with 62.5 per cent of Democrat votes flowing to Labor. Considering two-party estimates going back to the 1949 election, the swing to Labor in 2007 was the fourth-largest two-party-preferred swing, behind John Curtin and Labor in 1943 on 7.9 per cent, Malcolm Fraser and the Coalition in 1975 on 7.4 per cent, and Gough Whitlam and Labor in 1969 on 7.1 per cent. The swing was the largest since 1983, when full preference counting was introduced to create an exact two-party figure, and the largest swing to occur in the absence of a recession, political or military crisis.

Western Australia went against the national trend, with the Liberals suffering only a 2.14-point swing against them – lower than all except Tasmania and the ACT – but yet gaining one net seat. The weaker Labor performance was attributed to the strong economy and voters' unwillingness to do anything which might risk their present prosperity – a sentiment played to by Liberal campaigning strategies – and also the behaviour of union officials Kevin Reynolds and Joe McDonald who had made headlines during the campaign.

As of 2024, The 2007 election was the last time the National party received over 5% of the vote for the House of Representatives.

=== Senate ===
Senate (STV GV) — Turnout 95.17% (CV) — Informal 2.55%
Party	Votes	%	Swing	Seats won	Seats held	Change
Australian Labor Party	5,101,200	40.30	+5.28	18	32	▲4
Liberal/National Coalition						
Liberal/National joint ticket (Note: The Liberal and National parties ran a joint ticket in New South Wales, Victoria and Queensland. It includes the four senators from Queensland who ran on separate tickets at the 2004 election.)	3,883,479	30.68	−3.55	9	19	Steady
Liberal (Note: The Liberals-only ticket ran in Western Australia, South Australia, Tasmania and the Australian Capital Territory.)	1,110,366	8.77	−1.63	8	17	▼2
National (Note: The Nationals-only ticket ran in Western Australia and South Australia.)	20,997	0.17	+0.06	0	0	Steady
Country Liberal (Note: There are no Liberal or National parties in the Northern Territory, with the Country Liberal Party being the sole the centre-right coalition party .)	40,253	0.32	−0.03	1	1	Steady
Coalition total	5,055,095	39.94	–5.15	18	37	▼2
Greens	1,144,751	9.04	+1.38	3	5	▲1
Family First	204,788	1.62	–0.14	0	1	Steady
Democrats	162,975	1.29	–0.80	0	0	▼4
Others	987,996	7.81	–0.57	1 (Note: The independent senator was Nick Xenophon (South Australia).)	1	
Total	12,656,805			40	76	
Invalid/blank votes	331,009	2.55	−1.20			
Registered voters/turnout	13,646,539	95.17				
Source: Commonwealth Election 2007

Labor and the Coalition won 18 seats each in the half-Senate election. The Greens won three seats, with Independent Nick Xenophon being elected on primary votes alone. This took the 76-member Senate total to 37 Coalition, 32 Labor, 5 Green, 1 Family First, and 1 Independent. With a majority being 39 senators, when the new Senate met after 1 July 2008, the balance of power was shared between Xenophon, Family First's Steve Fielding and the five Greens. Xenophon, although reported as left-of-centre, indicated plans to work closely with the renegade National, Senator Barnaby Joyce. If sufficient Coalition senators voted for government legislation, support from the crossbench was not required.

Xenophon's election was at the expense of a Liberal candidate, without his presence the Coalition would have held enough Senate seats to block legislation.

Compared to the previous Senate, the Greens gained one (losing Kerry Nettle in NSW but gaining Sarah Hanson-Young in SA and Scott Ludlam in WA), a new Independent was elected (Xenophon), and Labor gained four seats. The Coalition lost two, and the Democrats lost all four of their seats.

The informal rate of 2.55 per cent ties with the 1993 election as the lowest informal rate in the Senate since federation. The introduction of the group voting ticket at the 1984 election saw the number of informal votes drop dramatically.

== Defeat of the Prime Minister ==
Prime Minister John Howard lost his own seat of Bennelong, in Northern Sydney, to Labor candidate and former journalist Maxine McKew, becoming the second sitting prime minister, and the third party leader, since Federation to be defeated in his own electorate. Prime Minister Stanley Bruce and National Party leader Charles Blunt lost their seats in 1929 and 1990 respectively. Howard had held the seat since 1974, and it had been in Liberal hands ever since its creation in 1949.

However, successive redistributions, along with demographic change, had made the once safe Liberal seat much friendlier to Labor; much of the area was represented by Labor at the state level. Howard's two-party majority was four percent, putting it right on the edge of seats that Labor would likely take in the event it won.

Late on election night, when conceding Labor had won government, Howard also acknowledged the likelihood he had lost Bennelong to McKew, though he and McKew agreed the margin was "very tight". He had been ahead by thin margins for most of the night, never leading by more than 0.2 percentage points. Howard had been 206 votes ahead of McKew on the first count, and finished 2.8 percentage points behind McKew on the estimated two-party vote. McKew declined to claim victory at first, saying that the seat was on "a knife edge," while the Australian Broadcasting Corporation listed Bennelong as a Labor gain on election night, and ABC election analyst Antony Green said there was "no doubt" McKew had won.

On 29 November, Rudd named McKew as a parliamentary secretary (assistant minister) to be appointed on 3 December, and on 1 December, McKew claimed victory. Although counting was incomplete at the time, with several postal and absentee ballots outstanding, it was expected that Howard would not win enough of the votes to retain his seat. McKew finished with a primary vote of 45.33 per cent, and a two-party-preferred vote of 51.40 per cent, a 5.53-point swing from 2004. Howard lost on the 14th count due to a large flow of Green preferences to McKew. This swing was within the redistributed boundaries after the 2004 election.

Three other Howard ministers were defeated – Mal Brough, Gary Nairn and Jim Lloyd.

== Seats changing hands ==
The following table indicates seats that changed hands from one party to another at this election. It compares the election results with the previous margins, taking into account the redistribution in New South Wales and Queensland. As a result, it includes the newly created electorate of Flynn, and the existing Parramatta, which was retained by Labor despite becoming a notional Liberal seat due to boundary changes. The table does not include Gwydir, which was abolished in the redistribution; Macquarie, which was reclassified from safe Liberal to marginal Labor and was subsequently won by Labor; or Calare, the seat of Independent MP Peter Andren, which was reclassified as a National seat by the redistribution and was won by the National Party.

Seat	Pre-2007			Swing	Post-2007		
Seat	Party	Member	Margin	Swing	Margin	Member	Party
Bass, Tas	Liberal	Michael Ferguson	2.63	3.63	1.00	Jodie Campbell	Labor
Bennelong, NSW	Liberal	John Howard	4.13	5.53	1.40	Maxine McKew	Labor
Blair, Qld	Liberal	Cameron Thompson	5.69	10.17	4.48	Shayne Neumann	Labor
Bonner, Qld	Liberal	Ross Vasta	0.51	5.04	4.53	Kerry Rea	Labor
Braddon, Tas	Liberal	Mark Baker	1.13	2.57	1.44	Sid Sidebottom	Labor
Corangamite, Vic	Liberal	Stewart McArthur	5.32	6.17	0.85	Darren Cheeseman	Labor
Cowan, WA	Labor	Graham Edwards	0.78	2.49	1.71	Luke Simpkins	Liberal
Dawson, Qld	National	De-Anne Kelly	9.99	13.20	3.21	James Bidgood	Labor
Deakin, Vic	Liberal	Phil Barresi	4.97	6.38	1.41	Mike Symon	Labor
Dobell, NSW	Liberal	Ken Ticehurst	4.84	8.74	3.90	Craig Thomson	Labor
Eden-Monaro, NSW	Liberal	Gary Nairn	3.27	6.67	3.40	Mike Kelly	Labor
Flynn, Qld	National	notional – new seat	7.72	7.88	0.16	Chris Trevor	Labor
Forde, Qld	Liberal	Kay Elson	11.52	14.43	2.91	Brett Raguse	Labor
Hasluck, WA	Liberal	Stuart Henry	1.82	3.08	1.26	Sharryn Jackson	Labor
Kingston, SA	Liberal	Kym Richardson	0.07	4.49	4.42	Amanda Rishworth	Labor
Leichhardt, Qld	Liberal	Warren Entsch	10.26	14.29	4.03	Jim Turnour	Labor
Lindsay, NSW	Liberal	Jackie Kelly	2.92	9.70	6.78	David Bradbury	Labor
Longman, Qld	Liberal	Mal Brough	6.75	10.32	3.57	Jon Sullivan	Labor
Makin, SA	Liberal	Trish Draper	0.93	8.63	7.70	Tony Zappia	Labor
Moreton, Qld	Liberal	Gary Hardgrave	2.83	7.58	4.75	Graham Perrett	Labor
Page, NSW	National	Ian Causley	5.47	7.83	2.36	Janelle Saffin	Labor
Parramatta, NSW	Liberal	notional – Julie Owens	0.83	7.71	6.88	Julie Owens	Labor
Petrie, Qld	Liberal	Teresa Gambaro	7.45	9.50	2.05	Yvette D'Ath	Labor
Robertson, NSW	Liberal	Jim Lloyd	6.87	6.98	0.11	Belinda Neal	Labor
Solomon, NT	Country Liberal	Dave Tollner	2.81	3.00	0.19	Damian Hale	Labor
Swan, WA	Labor	Kim Wilkie	0.08	0.19	0.11	Steve Irons	Liberal
Wakefield, SA	Liberal	David Fawcett	0.67	7.26	6.59	Nick Champion	Labor

- Members listed in italics did not contest their seats at this election.

== Aftermath ==
The Labor caucus met on Thursday 29 November 2007 to confirm the First Rudd Ministry, which was sworn in on 3 December. In a departure from Labor tradition, the ministry was selected by Kevin Rudd as the prime minister, rather than by Caucus.

Given John Howard's personal defeat, the Liberal Party began the process of choosing a new leader. The morning after the election, Peter Costello, the Deputy Leader of the Liberal Party, and long regarded as Howard's natural successor, stated that he would not run for Liberal leadership. The day before the ballot, former Health Minister Tony Abbott withdrew from the leadership after initially indicating he would stand. The leadership ballot was held on Thursday 29 November. The previous Defence Minister Brendan Nelson and former Environmental Minister Malcolm Turnbull both stood for the leadership. Former Education Minister Julie Bishop contested the deputy leadership position, as did Andrew Robb and Christopher Pyne.

Brendan Nelson was elected leader by 45 votes to 42, and Julie Bishop was elected deputy leader. A Newspoll survey taken after the Liberal leadership change revealed a preferred-prime-minister rating of Rudd 61 per cent to Nelson 14 per cent, with Turnbull twice as popular as Nelson. Newspoll's subsequent polling saw new Newspoll records set, at 70 per cent for the best rating for preferred prime minister, to 9 per cent for the worst rating for preferred prime minister, with the next poll results revealing another record of 73 to 7 per cent. A new two party preferred record was also set, at 63 to 37 per cent Labor's way.

Post-election, ALP secretary Tim Gartrell commented on pre-election campaign billboard ads featuring a picture of John Howard stating "Working families in Australia have never been better off", which looked like Liberal Party advertisements, were actually paid for by the Labor Party. Liberal leader Brendan Nelson declared that the Liberal Party had listened and learned from the Australian public and declared WorkChoices "dead".

In 2008, former ministers Peter McGauran, Alexander Downer, and Mark Vaile resigned from parliament, sparking Gippsland, Mayo, and Lyne by-elections. The Lyne by-election resulted in independent Rob Oakeshott being elected, reducing the total number of Coalition seats to 64. Bradfield and Higgins by-elections were held in December 2009.

In September 2008, Malcolm Turnbull replaced Brendan Nelson in a leadership spill, and Barnaby Joyce replaced CLP Senator and Nationals deputy leader Nigel Scullion as leader of the Nationals in the Senate, and moved the party to the crossbenches. Joyce stated that his party would no longer necessarily vote with their Liberal counterparts in the upper house.

The disproportionality of the lower house in the 2007 election was 10.28 according to the Gallagher Index, mainly between the Labor and Green Parties.
Party	Vote %	Seat %	Difference	Diff. Squared
Australian Labor Party	43.38	55.33	11.95	142.8025
Liberal	36.28	36.66	0.38	0.1444
The Greens	7.79	0.00	7.79	60.6841
The Nationals	5.49	6.66	1.17	1.3689
Independent	2.22	1.33	0.89	0.7921
Family First	1.99	0.00	1.99	3.9601
CDP Christian Party	0.84	0.00	0.84	0.7056
Democrats	0.72	0.00	0.72	0.5184
CLP - The Territory Party	0.32	0.00	0.32	0.1024
One Nation	0.26	0.00	0.26	0.0676
Citizens Electoral Council	0.22	0.00	0.22	0.0484
Liberty and Democracy Party	0.14	0.00	0.14	0.0196
Socialist Alliance	0.08	0.00	0.08	0.0064
Climate Change Coalition	0.08	0.00	0.08	0.0064
DLP - Democracy Labor Party	0.05	0.00	0.05	0.0025
Conservatives for Climate and Environment Incorporated	0.03	0.00	0.03	0.0009
Socialist Equality Party	0.03	0.00	0.03	0.0009
What Women Want (Australia)	0.03	0.00	0.03	0.0009
The Fishing Party	0.02	0.00	0.02	0.0004
Non-Custodial Parents Party	0.01	0.00	0.01	0.0001
Non Affiliated	0.01	0.00	0.01	0.0001
			Total	211.23
			Halved	105.62
			Sqrt	10.28

== See also ==
- Climate change in Australia
- Divisions of the Australian House of Representatives
- Electoral system of Australia
- List of political parties in Australia
