= National Tally Room =

Australian centre for election results (1972–2010)

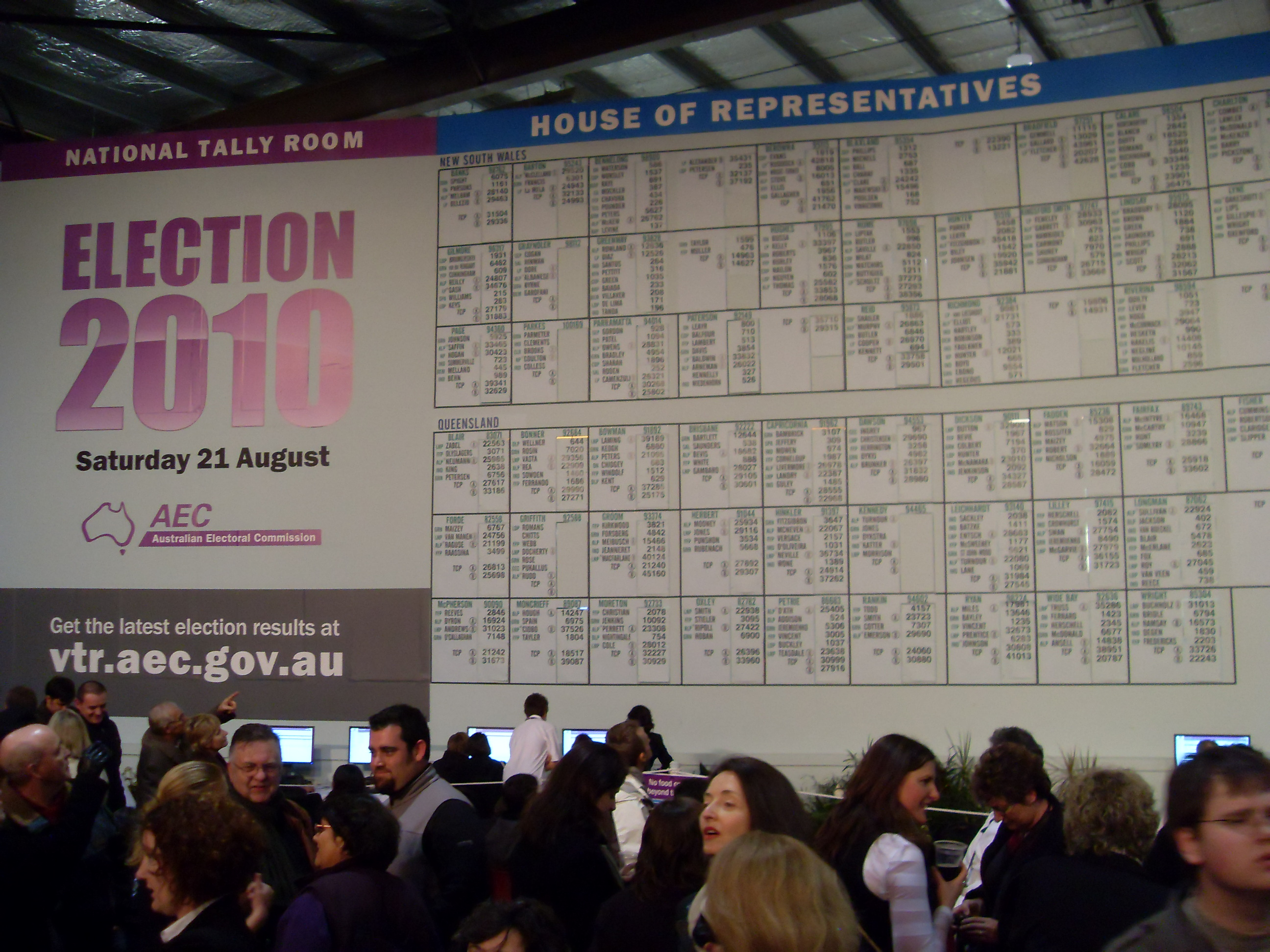
- The main board in the National Tally Room at the 2010 federal election, in EPIC, Canberra.
- Address: Budawang Building
- Location: EPIC, Canberra, Australian Capital Territory, Australia
- Owner: Australian Electoral Commission
- Type: Former temporary coordinating centre for Australian federal election results

Construction
- Opened: 1972
- Closed: 21 August 2010 (date of last use); Donated to the Museum of Australian Democracy (following the 2013 federal election)

The National Tally Room was the Australian centre for federal election results to be tallied for electorates and Senate quotas, making up the Parliament of Australia, which consists of the House of Representatives and the Senate. The Tally Room was operated by the Australian Electoral Commission (AEC) between 1972 and 2010.

The tally room normally opened as results began to flow in after voting ended at 6 pm on the day of the election, always a Saturday, in the respective states and territories, and polling places began to count the votes; however, some voting figures would be received as early as 5.20 pm. On election night, the room closed after the final results from polling places were announced to the tally room, often after midnight following the day of the election. Polling centres that did not finish counting all votes recommenced counting on Sunday.

The Tally Room operated between the 1972 and 2010 federal elections. At the 1998 federal election, the AEC introduced the Virtual Tally Room, which eventually superseded the Tally Room at the 2013 federal election.

== History ==
The tally room was set up in the Budawang Building at Exhibition Park in Canberra (EPIC) in the northern suburbs of Canberra, the national capital city of Australia. A former venue, in the late 1970s, was the then newly built hall at Belconnen High School, a high school in the Canberra district of Belconnen. At the 1996 federal election, the Australian Institute of Sport was used as a venue for the tally room.

The tally room was fitted out by the AEC for the national elections; and was also used for live broadcasts by media outlets, normally led by the Australian television networks. Over 700 people worked in the tally room on the evening of the election. A defining feature of the tally room was the tally board; at 37 metres (121 ft) wide and 7 metres (23 ft) high, this wooden structure displayed the results for every Division in the House of Representatives.

Boards representing each Division and Senate seat were set up on a "tally wall". A box representing each Division was headed by the name of the Division and the number of registered electors (shown in green lettering), then the names of the candidates prefaced by the acronym for their political party, and against their names the currently-recorded count of first preference votes; at the bottom were two lines (A and B) for Two Candidate Preferred totals, estimating the result after a notional distribution of the preference votes. Staff at the rear of the tally wall changed the details by attaching number sheets to the rotating portion of the Division boxes. Media and the public followed the electoral results from the viewing gallery and the media/television sets on the floor of the tally room. Often, current, former or prospective members of the Parliament were seen on the floor, or at the media booths.

For the 2013 federal election, no television networks chose to use the tally room as their backdrop, and subsequently, the AEC announced it would not operate the room for that election. The National Tally Room was replaced by an online Virtual Tally Room, and the tally board was donated to the Museum of Australian Democracy.

== Gallery ==
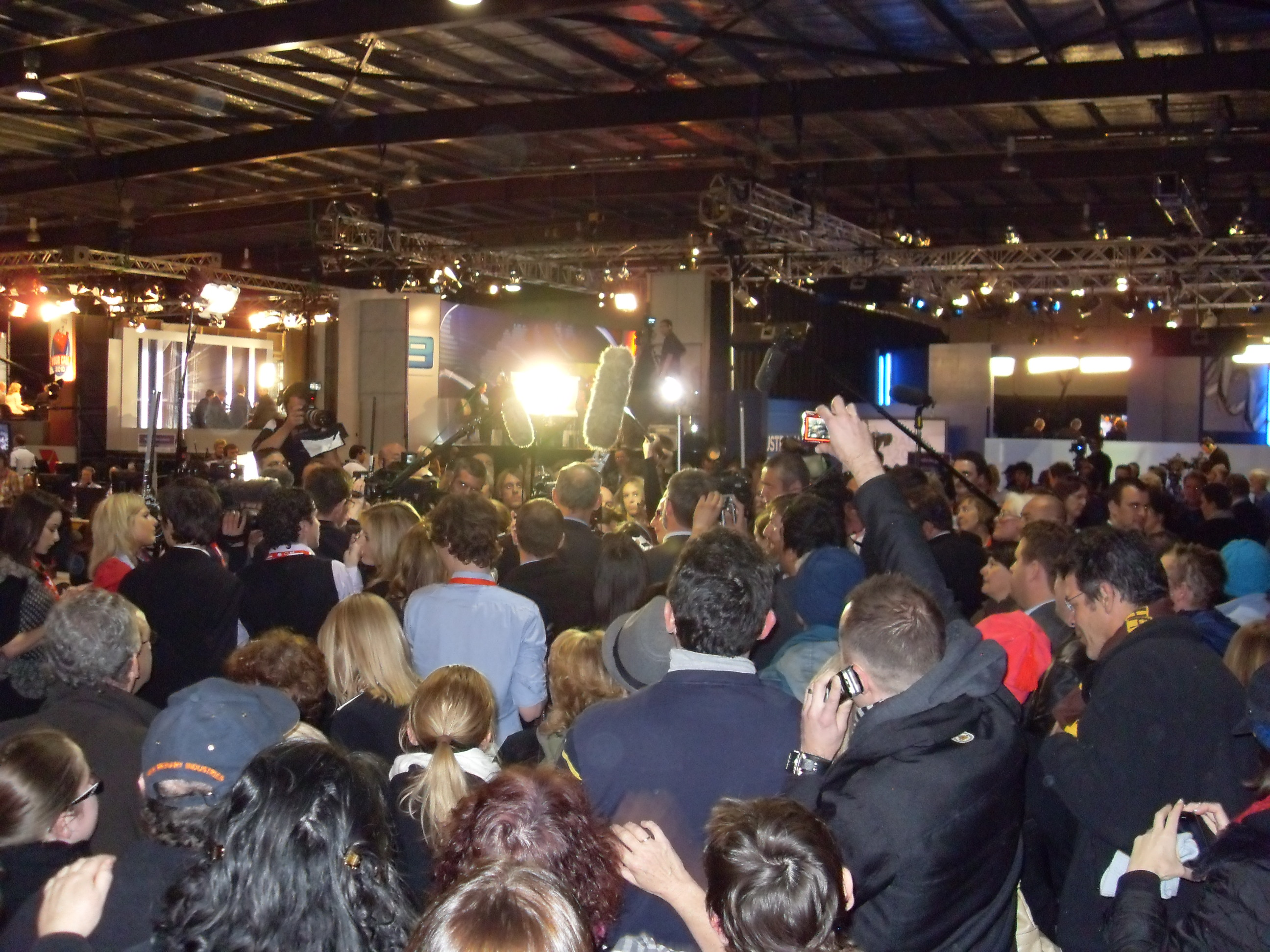
Television sets at the rear of the room, behind a media scrum around Bob Brown, former leader of the Australian Greens.

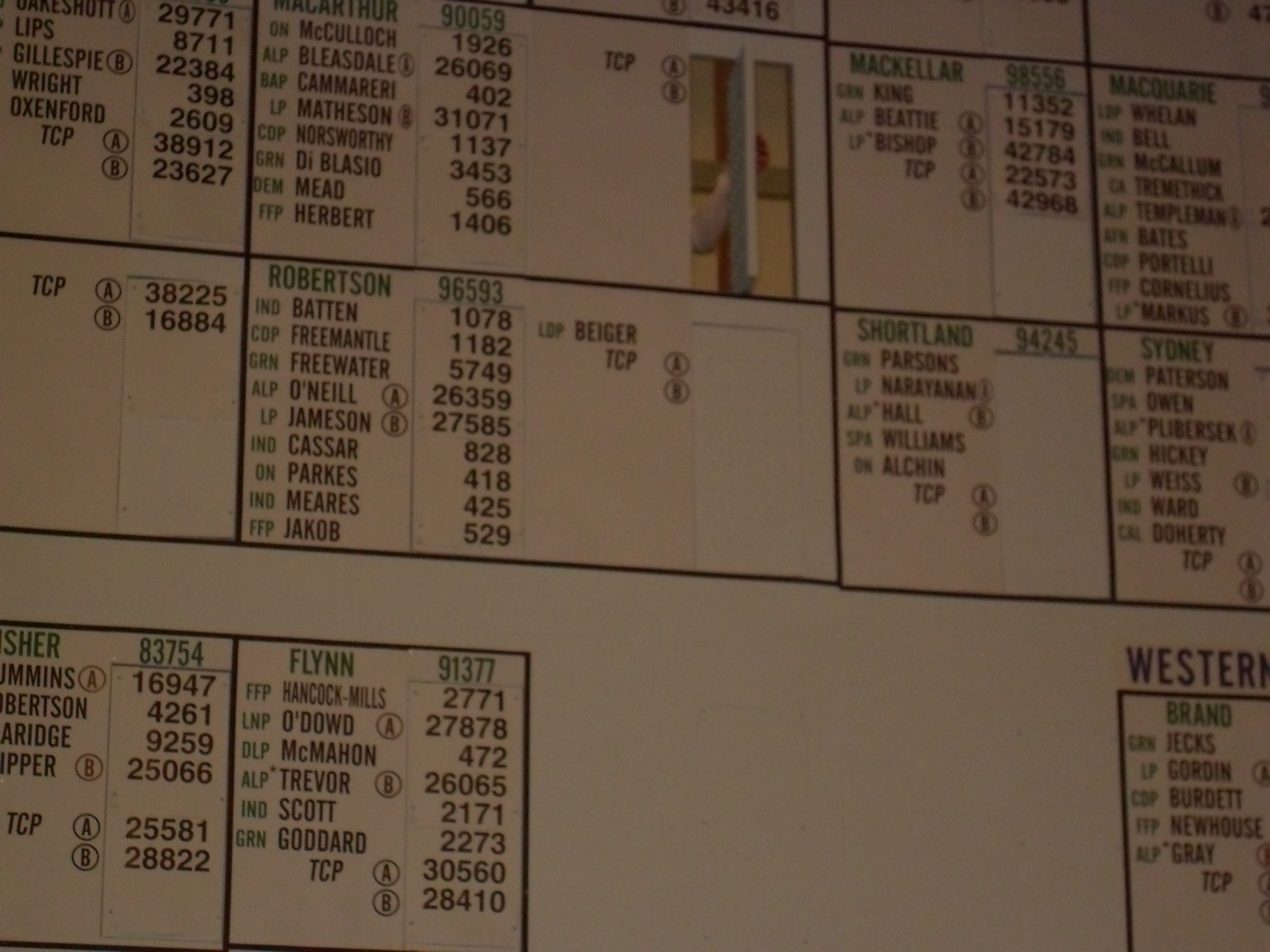
Main board being changed; operators rotate the numbers board from behind.

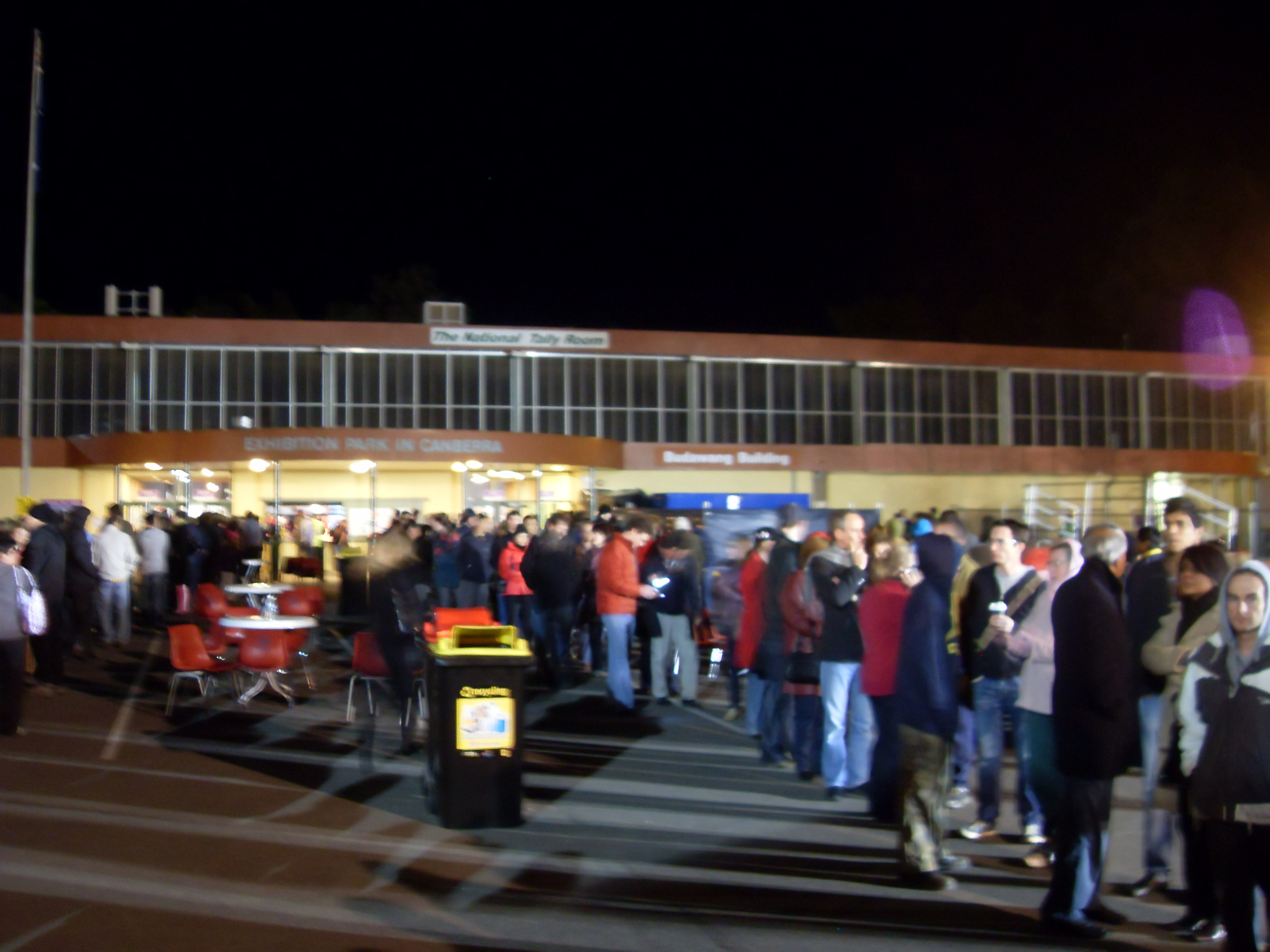
Queues for members of the public to enter the National Tally Room, 9pm 21 August 2010.

== See also ==
- Chaser Yes We Canberra
