= Ken Wyatt =

Australian politician (born 1952)

The Honourable Ken Wyatt AM
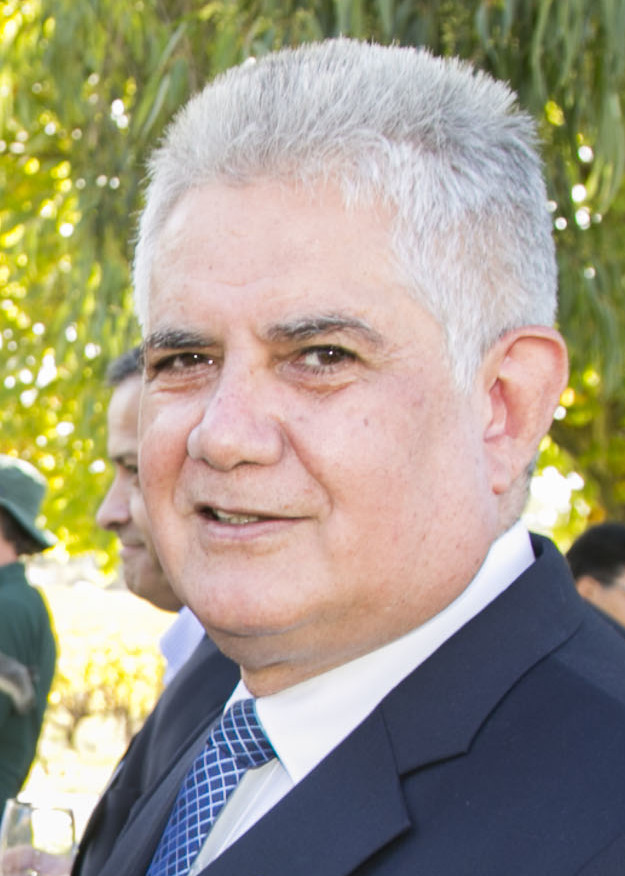
- Wyatt in 2014

Minister for Indigenous Australians
- In office 29 May 2019 – 23 May 2022
- Prime Minister: Scott Morrison
- Preceded by: Nigel Scullion
- Succeeded by: Linda Burney

Minister for Senior Australians and Aged Care
- In office 24 January 2017 – 29 May 2019
- Prime Minister: Malcolm Turnbull; Scott Morrison
- Preceded by: Himself (as assistant minister)
- Succeeded by: Richard Colbeck

Minister for Indigenous Health
- In office 24 January 2017 – 29 May 2019
- Prime Minister: Malcolm Turnbull; Scott Morrison
- Preceded by: Warren Snowdon (2013)
- Succeeded by: Abolished

Assistant Minister for Health and Aged Care
- In office 30 September 2015 – 24 January 2017
- Prime Minister: Malcolm Turnbull
- Preceded by: Fiona Nash
- Succeeded by: Himself (as Minister for Aged Care); David Gillespie (as Assistant Minister for Health)

Member of the Australian Parliament for Hasluck
- In office 21 August 2010 – 21 May 2022
- Preceded by: Sharryn Jackson
- Succeeded by: Tania Lawrence

Personal details
- Born: Kenneth George Wyatt; 4 August 1952 (age 74) Bunbury, Western Australia, Australia
- Party: Independent (since 2023)
- Other political affiliations: Liberal (until 2023)
- Spouse(s): Anna-Maria Palermo (m. 2010) Roza Veskovich (div.)
- Children: 2
- Relatives: Cedric Wyatt (cousin); Ben Wyatt (second cousin)
- Occupation: Public servant
- Profession: Teacher

Kenneth George Wyatt (born 4 August 1952) is an Australian former politician. He was a member of the House of Representatives from 2010 to 2022, representing the Division of Hasluck for the Liberal Party. He is the first Indigenous Australian elected to the House of Representatives, the first to serve as a government minister, and the first appointed to cabinet.

Wyatt was appointed Minister for Aged Care and Minister for Indigenous Health in the Turnbull government in January 2017, after previously serving as an assistant minister since September 2015. He was elevated to cabinet in May 2019 as Minister for Indigenous Australians in the Morrison government. At the 2022 federal election, Wyatt lost his seat to the Labor candidate Tania Lawrence.

On 6 April 2023 Wyatt resigned his membership of the Liberal Party over its stance on the Indigenous Voice to Parliament, after leader Peter Dutton had announced the party's decision to support the "No" vote at the referendum on the Voice.

== Early life ==
Kenneth George Wyatt was born on 4 August 1952 in Bunbury, Western Australia. He is of English, Irish, Indian and Indigenous Australian descent. He was born at Roelands Aboriginal Mission, a former home for young Indigenous children removed from their families. His mother, Mona Abdullah, was one of the Stolen Generations of Aboriginal children removed from their parents and relocated to Roelands, where she met her husband Don. Wyatt's father has Yamatji and Irish ancestry. His mother has Wongi and Noongar ancestry, while her surname, Abdullah, is from an ancestor who migrated from India to be a cameleer, helping lay the trans-Australia telegraph line.

== Career ==
Prior to entering Parliament, Wyatt served as senior public servant in the fields of Aboriginal health and education. He has held positions as Director of the WA Office of Aboriginal Health as well as a similar post with NSW Health. He was also previously Director of Aboriginal Education with the WA Department of Education.

== Politics ==
Wyatt was a member of the Moderate/Modern Liberal faction of the Liberal Party.

=== 2010–2015: backbencher ===
Wyatt stood for the Liberal Party in the seat of Hasluck in the 2010 election, defeating Labor incumbent Sharryn Jackson. He won the seat with a 1.4-point swing, and became the first Aboriginal person to be elected to the Australian House of Representatives, (Note: David Kennedy was the first Indigenous individual to be elected to both a state parliament and the Federal Parliament, having served as the ALP Member for Bendigo (1969–1972) prior to entering the Victorian Parliament in 1982 (MLA, ALP). However, his Indigenous heritage was not known when he entered both parliaments nor did he self-identify as Indigenous at that time. For these reasons Neville Bonner is recorded as the first Indigenous federal parliamentarian.) and the third elected to the Parliament (behind Neville Bonner and Aden Ridgeway, both Senators). After his election, he received racist hate mail from people who said that they would not have voted for him if they had realised that he was Indigenous.

On 28 September 2010, Wyatt attended the opening of the 43rd Australian Parliament to take up his seat as member for Hasluck. He wore a traditional Booka – a kangaroo skin coat with feathers from a red-tailed black cockatoo, signifying a leadership role in Noongar culture. The cloak had been presented to him by Noongar elders. He made his maiden speech to the Parliament on 29 September and received a standing ovation from both the government and opposition benches as well as from the public galleries.

=== 2015–2019: frontbencher ===
On 20 September 2015, Prime Minister Malcolm Turnbull announced that Wyatt would become Assistant Minister for Health, making him the first Indigenous frontbencher in federal parliament. Although his term commenced on 21 September, he was not sworn in with the other ministers as he was overseas, with his ceremony taking place on 30 September. On 18 February 2016, Wyatt's responsibilities were expanded to include aged care in addition to health following a rearrangement in the ministry; and were expanded further when on 24 January 2017 Wyatt was the first indigenous Australian appointed as an Australian Government Minister, with responsibility for the portfolio of Aged Care and the newly established portfolio of Indigenous Health.

=== 2019–2022: Minister for Indigenous Australians ===
Wyatt retained his marginal seat at the May 2019 federal election with an increased majority. After the election, he was appointed Minister for Indigenous Australians in the Second Morrison Ministry. He is the first Indigenous person to hold the position and was also elevated to cabinet.

In July 2019, he gave an address to the National Press Club, in which he spoke of the theme of NAIDOC Week 2019: "Voice. Treaty. Truth.". He said that he would "develop and bring forward a consensus option for constitutional recognition to be put to a referendum during the current parliamentary term". He spoke of the development of a local, regional and national voice, and said "with respect to [Indigenous] Treaty, it's important that states and territory jurisdictions take the lead. When you consider the constitution, they are better placed to undertake that work", and with regard to truth-telling, he would "work on approaches to work on how we progress towards truth-telling".

In January 2022, Wyatt announced that the federal government had secured copyright over the Australian Aboriginal flag, following negotiations with the flag's designer Harold Thomas.

At the 2022 federal election, Wyatt lost his seat to the Labor candidate Tania Lawrence.

==== Indigenous voice to government ====
On 30 October 2019, Wyatt announced the commencement of a "co-design process" aimed at providing an "Indigenous voice to government". The Senior Advisory Group (SAG) is co-chaired by Professor Tom Calma AO, Chancellor of the University of Canberra, and Professor Dr Marcia Langton, Associate Provost at the University of Melbourne, and as of October 2019 comprised a total of 20 leaders and experts from across the country. The models for the Voice were developed in two stages. The first meeting of the group was held in Canberra on 13 November 2019.

In June 2022, after the WA Liberal Party passed a motion at its state conference urging the national leader of the party, Peter Dutton, to oppose the Voice, Wyatt said "I just find it very disappointing that a party that I have been heavily involved with, believe in, and see as having a set of values that match mine, make such a decision".

=== 2023: resignation from the Liberal Party ===
In March 2023, Wyatt stood with Labor prime minister Anthony Albanese, along with other members of the referendum working group, as Albanese announced the wording of the proposed constitutional change in Canberra.

On 6 April 2023 Wyatt resigned his membership of the Liberal Party over its stance on the Voice, after Dutton had announced the party's decision to support the "No" vote at the Voice referendum. He said that he still believed in the values of the Liberal Party, but he no longer believed in what the Liberals had become. "Aboriginal people are reaching out to be heard but the Liberals have rejected their invitation", he said.

In April 2025, Wyatt commented that he supports Welcome to Country ceremonies and rejects any political interference against these events.

=== 2027: Governor ===
In November 2026 Wyatt was chosen at the new Governor of Western Australia, to take office after Chris Dawson's term finishes on 31 December 2026. He will be WA's first Aboriginal governor.

== Honours ==
- 1996: Member of the Order of Australia for services to Aboriginal health
- 2001: Centenary Medal

== Other activities and roles ==
In 2019, Wyatt delivered the Frank Archibald Memorial Lecture at the University of New England on the topic "Teaching Indigenous Australia – Understanding our past and unlocking our future".

== Personal life ==
Wyatt first married when he was 21, to Roza Veskovich, a librarian of Balkan heritage. The couple lived above a funeral parlour in East Perth for four years. They had two boys, but separated after 25 years of marriage, partly due to his frequent travelling for work. His son, Aaron Wyatt is a professional classical musician and is recognised as the first Australian First Nations person to conduct one of the major orchestras in Australia.

In December 2010 Wyatt married Anna-Maria Palermo, when he was 60 and she was 56. They met at an education conference. She is of Italian descent, and they married in Italy.

Wyatt's cousin Cedric Wyatt was an Australian public servant and Indigenous rights advocate. Cedric's son Ben Wyatt (Ken's first cousin, once removed) is a former Labor politician who served as the Treasurer of Western Australia from 2017 until March 2021. Ben was also Western Australia's Aboriginal Affairs Minister which at the time made Ken, as Indigenous Australians Minister, his federal portfolio counterpart.

== See also ==
- Political families of Australia

== Notes ==
Parliament of Australia
Preceded by Sharryn Jackson	Member for Hasluck; 2010–2022	Succeeded by Tania Lawrence
Political offices
Preceded by Nigel Scullion	Minister for Indigenous Australians; 2019–2022	Succeeded by Linda Burney
Preceded by Sussan Ley	Minister for Senior Australians and Aged Care; 2017–2019	Succeeded by Richard Colbeck
New title	Minister for Indigenous Health; 2017–2019	Abolished
Preceded by Fiona Nash	Assistant Minister for Health / Assistant Minister for Health and Aged Care; 2015–2017	Succeeded by Himself as Minister for Aged Care
Preceded by Fiona Nash	Assistant Minister for Health / Assistant Minister for Health and Aged Care; 2015–2017	Succeeded by David Gillespie as Assistant Minister for Health
