= Sharryn Jackson =

Australian politician (born 1962)

Member of the Australian Parliament for Hasluck
- In office 10 November 2001 – 9 October 2004
- Preceded by: New seat
- Succeeded by: Stuart Henry
- In office 24 November 2007 – 21 August 2010
- Preceded by: Stuart Henry
- Succeeded by: Ken Wyatt

Personal details
- Born: 12 February 1962 (age 64) Perth, Western Australia
- Party: Australian Labor Party
- Education: University of Western Australia
- Occupation: Unionist

Sharryn Maree Jackson (born 12 February 1962), is a former Australian politician, who was formerly an Australian Labor Party member of the Australian House of Representatives. She served one term from 2001 representing the Division of Hasluck before losing the seat at the 2004 federal election. She regained the seat at the 2007 federal election and was then defeated at the 2010 federal election.

Jackson was also previously an elected member of the National Executive of the Labor Party.

== Personal life ==
Jackson was born in Perth, Western Australia, to parents from Bayswater and Guildford. During her early childhood, she travelled throughout rural Western Australia with her parents and three sisters. In her teenage years, she lived at the Swanleigh Residential College in Middle Swan, and attended Lockridge Senior High School. She went on to complete a Bachelor of Arts degree majoring in English, at the University of Western Australia.

In 1999, Jackson was included on the honour roll celebrating the centenary of women's suffrage in Western Australia.

Jackson is married and, together with her husband John, they live in Gooseberry Hill. She has two stepchildren.

== Career ==
After graduating from university, she was the women's officer of the Western Australian Trades and Labor Council. For the 15 years prior to her entry into politics, she was, firstly, the Industrial Officer, and later the Assistant State Secretary of the Miscellaneous Workers' Union.

=== Political career ===
After being overlooked by the Richard Court-led State Coalition Government for a posting as Commissioner of the Western Australian Industrial Relations Commission, in mid-2000 Jackson resolved to run for Federal Parliament.

After the electoral redistribution which created the Division of Hasluck for the 2001 Australian Federal election, the electorate was notionally held by Labor with a margin of 2.55 per cent. In the election, Jackson polled a lower primary vote than Liberal contender Bethwyn Chan, but won the seat after a distribution of minor party preferences gave her a margin of 1.8 per cent.

In 2004, Jackson was vocal in her criticism of Deckers Outdoor Corporation's campaign to enforce trademarks on the generic term "ugg boot", and helped to establish a successful fighting fund to challenge their trademarks. During her first term in office Jackson also campaigned for the establishment of a university in the eastern suburbs of Perth, an area that was not served by university.

At the 2004 Federal election, Jackson faced a challenge from first-time election candidate Stuart Henry. During the election campaign, Henry's electoral team sent campaign materials to households in the electorate in which Henry was described as "Member for Hasluck", sparking complaints to the Australian Electoral Commission (AEC) by the WA Labor Party. Jackson said it was part of a "dirty tricks" campaign by Henry, even though the AEC concluded that the letters were not directly misleading. Jackson was defeated by Henry.

=== Post political career ===
Following her defeat in the 2004 election, Jackson worked as Chief of Staff for State MP Bob Kucera, who was the Minister for Sport and Recreation.

Jackson was appointed by Western Australian Premier Alan Carpenter as Director of the "Community Cabinet and Liaison Unit", part of the Department of Premier and Cabinet, in May 2005. Her employment in this role drew criticism, since the job was not advertised and the role was already being filled by other public servants. It was also a controversial appointment because she kept her A$120,000 salary as a Ministerial Chief of Staff and the unit's primary role was as a "propaganda machine" creating promotional material for Government members but not for other members.

She was elected as Western Australian State President of the Australian Labor Party in November 2005, defeating Sarah Burke in a tight contest. She took over this position from Michelle Roberts, a Member of the Western Australian Legislative Assembly. Jackson, a member of Labor's Socialist Left faction, signaled that she intended to bridge the widening divisions between the different factions within the State Labor Party. Jackson was re-elected State President in June 2006, again defeating Burke.

After initially considering running for the Division of Brand in the forthcoming 2007 Federal election to replace outgoing member Kim Beazley, Jackson announced in January 2007 that she intended to once again seek Labor Party endorsement for the seat of Hasluck. She also signalled her intention to resign as State President of Labor if she gained endorsement. Silvia Barzotto, from Labor's "New Right" faction also nominated, and Jackson was successful. Jackson resigned from her position within the Department of Premier and Cabinet in March 2007, and Sally Talbot succeeded Jackson as State Labor President in June 2007.

=== Re-election into federal parliament ===
Jackson was a successful candidate at the 2007 federal election, regaining her former seat of Hasluck. During this time, a Government decision to allow the construction of a brick works in the electorate, against the wishes of the sitting member, Stuart Henry led to voter discontent. Mirroring an election promise made by John Howard when he was visiting the electorate the previous week, Jackson announced that Labor would undertake major roads funding in Hasluck, including the construction of a grade-separated interchange at Great Eastern Highway and Roe Highway, to cost $48 million. As of 2010, Jackson had not met this election promise.

At the 2010 federal election it took several days to determine an outcome in the seat of Hasluck as the result was very close. Ken Wyatt claimed victory in the seat on 29 August, with over 900 votes ahead on a two-party preferred basis.

Parliament of Australia
| New division | Member for Hasluck; 2001–2004 | Succeeded by Stuart Henry |
| Preceded by Stuart Henry | Member for Hasluck; 2007–2010 | Succeeded by Ken Wyatt |
