= Stuart Henry (politician) =

Australian politician

Member of the Australian Parliament for Hasluck
- In office 9 October 2004 – 24 November 2007
- Preceded by: Sharryn Jackson
- Succeeded by: Sharryn Jackson

Personal details
- Born: 21 June 1946 (age 79)
- Party: Liberal Party of Australia
- Occupation: Businessman

Stuart Irwin Henry (born 21 June 1946), is an Australian former politician, who was elected to the House of Representatives as member for the Division of Hasluck, Western Australia for the Liberal Party of Australia at the 2004 federal election. He was a small business proprietor and farm manager before entering politics.

Henry is a member of the Australian Society of Association Executives and the Australian Institute of Company Directors, and was a director of Group Training Australia 2002–03, the West Australian Construction Industry Redundancy Fund 1999–2003 and the Australian Construction Industry Safety Training Trust. He was Deputy Chair of the Building and Construction Industry Training Council (BCITC) 2002–03.

Henry lost his seat to Labor candidate Sharryn Jackson at the 2007 general election, whom he had unseated in 2004.

Parliament of Australia
Preceded by Sharryn Jackson	Member for Hasluck; 2004–2007	Succeeded by Sharryn Jackson
