= Electoral results for the Division of Canning =

Australian division election results

This is a list of electoral results for the Division of Canning in Australian federal elections from the division's creation in 1949 until the present.

== Members ==
Member	Party	Term
Len Hamilton	Country	1949–1961
Neil McNeill	Liberal	1961–1963
John Hallett	Country	1963–1974
Mel Bungey	Liberal	1974–1983
Wendy Fatin	Labor	1983–1984
George Gear	Labor	1984–1996
Ricky Johnston	Liberal	1996–1998
Jane Gerick	Labor	1998–2001
Don Randall	Liberal	2001–2015
Andrew Hastie	Liberal	2015–present

== Election results ==
=== Elections in the 2020s ===
==== 2025 ====
2025 Australian federal election: Canning
Party	Candidate	Votes	%	±%
Liberal	Andrew Hastie			
One Nation	Fernando Bove			
Greens	Jordan Cahill			
Citizens	John Raymond Carey			
Legalise Cannabis	Paul Gullan			
Labor	Jarrad Goold			
Total formal votes				
Informal votes				
Turnout				

==== 2022 ====
2022 Australian federal election: Canning
Party	Candidate	Votes	%	±%
Liberal	Andrew Hastie	41,294	43.81	−5.31
Labor	Amanda Hunt	30,897	32.78	+5.24
Greens	Jodie Moffat	7,659	8.13	+0.64
One Nation	Tammi Siwes	4,215	4.47	−2.63
United Australia	James Waldeck	2,438	2.59	+0.33
Western Australia	Brad Bedford	2,202	2.34	−0.46
Independent	Ashley Williams	1,708	1.81	+1.81
Christians	Andriette du Plessis	1,689	1.79	−0.16
Informed Medical Options	Judith Congrene	785	0.83	+0.83
Liberal Democrats	David Gardiner	749	0.79	+0.79
Federation	Anthony Gardyne	628	0.67	+0.67
Total formal votes		94,264	93.50	−0.43
Informal votes		6,558	6.50	+0.43
Turnout		100,822	87.55	−2.20
Two-party-preferred result
Liberal	Andrew Hastie	50,513	53.59	−7.97
Labor	Amanda Hunt	43,751	46.41	+7.97
Liberal hold		Swing	−7.97	

Alluvial diagram for preference flows in the seat of Canning in the 2022 federal election. indicates at what stage the winning candidate had over 50% of the votes and was declared the winner.

=== Elections in the 2010s ===
==== 2019 ====
2019 Australian federal election: Canning
Party	Candidate	Votes	%	±%
Liberal	Andrew Hastie	44,580	49.05	−1.25
Labor	Mellisa Teede	24,996	27.50	−5.54
Greens	Jodie Moffat	6,840	7.53	−1.21
One Nation	Jackson Wreford	6,503	7.15	+7.15
Western Australia	Brett Clarke	2,554	2.81	+2.81
United Australia	Steve Veevers	2,055	2.26	+2.26
Christians	Jamie Van Burgel	1,764	1.94	−1.74
Conservative National	Malcolm Heffernan	1,600	1.76	+1.76
Total formal votes		90,892	93.91	−1.85
Informal votes		5,890	6.09	+1.85
Turnout		96,782	90.30	+1.08
Two-party-preferred result
Liberal	Andrew Hastie	55,947	61.55	+4.76
Labor	Mellisa Teede	34,945	38.45	−4.76
Liberal hold		Swing	+4.76	

==== 2016 ====
2016 Australian federal election: Canning
Party	Candidate	Votes	%	±%
Liberal	Andrew Hastie	42,497	50.30	−1.53
Labor	Barry Winmar	27,918	33.04	+5.61
Greens	Aeron Blundell-Camden	7,388	8.74	+1.63
National	Jason Turner	3,581	4.24	+2.54
Christians	Janine Vander Ven	3,110	3.68	+1.53
Total formal votes		84,494	95.76	+1.09
Informal votes		3,743	4.24	−1.09
Turnout		88,237	89.22	+2.78
Two-party-preferred result
Liberal	Andrew Hastie	47,987	56.79	−4.56
Labor	Barry Winmar	36,507	43.21	+4.56
Liberal hold		Swing	−4.56	

==== 2015 ====
2015 Canning by-election
Party	Candidate	Votes	%	±%
Liberal	Andrew Hastie	39,712	46.92	−4.15
Labor	Matt Keogh	30,096	35.56	+8.92
Greens	Vanessa Rauland	4,967	5.87	−1.53
Palmer United	Vimal Sharma	2,600	3.07	−3.81
Christians	Jamie van Burgel	2,433	2.87	−0.23
Animal Justice	Katrina Love	1,195	1.41	+1.41
Pirate	Michelle Allen	775	0.92	+0.92
Defence Veterans	Greg Smith	690	0.82	+0.82
Family First	Jim McCourt	623	0.74	−0.61
Independent	Teresa van Lieshout	539	0.64	+0.64
Sustainable Population	Angela Smith	513	0.61	+0.61
Liberal Democrats	Connor Whittle	492	0.58	+0.58
Total formal votes		84,635	94.34	−0.14
Informal votes		5,082	5.66	+0.14
Turnout		89,717	79.53	−12.48
Two-party-preferred result
Liberal	Andrew Hastie	46,772	55.26	−6.55
Labor	Matt Keogh	37,863	44.74	+6.55
Liberal hold		Swing	−6.55	

==== 2013 ====
2013 Australian federal election: Canning
Party	Candidate	Votes	%	±%
Liberal	Don Randall	45,189	51.07	+4.89
Labor	Joanne Dean	23,578	26.64	−13.71
Greens	Damon Pages-Oliver	6,547	7.40	−0.89
Palmer United	Wendy Lamotte	6,088	6.88	+6.88
Christians	Derek Bruning	2,742	3.10	+3.10
National	James Forsyth	1,707	1.93	+1.93
Family First	Alice Harper	1,197	1.35	−0.19
Katter's Australian	Richard Eldridge	776	0.88	+0.88
Rise Up Australia	Lee Rumble	669	0.76	+0.76
Total formal votes		88,493	94.48	−1.00
Informal votes		5,173	5.52	+1.00
Turnout		93,666	92.05	−1.11
Two-party-preferred result
Liberal	Don Randall	54,700	61.81	+9.62
Labor	Joanne Dean	33,793	38.19	−9.62
Liberal hold		Swing	+9.62	

==== 2010 ====
2010 Australian federal election: Canning
Party	Candidate	Votes	%	±%
Liberal	Don Randall	36,999	46.18	−2.23
Labor	Alannah MacTiernan	32,330	40.35	+2.62
Greens	Denise Hardie	6,645	8.29	+0.54
Christian Democrats	Jamie van Burgel	2,470	3.08	+0.28
Family First	Darren Vernede	1,231	1.54	+0.28
Citizens Electoral Council	Ian Tuffnell	446	0.56	+0.24
Total formal votes		80,121	95.48	−1.07
Informal votes		3,795	4.52	+1.07
Turnout		83,916	93.13	+0.01
Two-party-preferred result
Liberal	Don Randall	41,818	52.19	−2.16
Labor	Alannah MacTiernan	38,303	47.81	+2.16
Liberal hold		Swing	−2.16	

=== Elections in the 2000s ===
==== 2007 ====
2007 Australian federal election: Canning
Party	Candidate	Votes	%	±%
Liberal	Don Randall	42,639	49.70	−3.04
Labor	John Hughes	31,699	36.95	+4.07
Greens	Denise Hardie	6,396	7.45	+2.40
Christian Democrats	Kevin Swarts	2,427	2.83	+0.42
One Nation	Brian Deane	1,264	1.47	−1.26
Family First	Rodney Grasso	1,112	1.30	+0.29
Citizens Electoral Council	Brian McCarthy	261	0.30	−0.56
Total formal votes		85,798	96.70	+2.41
Informal votes		2,925	3.30	−2.41
Turnout		88,723	93.71	−0.07
Two-party-preferred result
Liberal	Don Randall	47,689	55.58	−3.96
Labor	John Hughes	38,109	44.42	+3.96
Liberal hold		Swing	−3.96	

==== 2004 ====
2004 Australian federal election: Canning
Party	Candidate	Votes	%	±%
Liberal	Don Randall	39,354	52.74	+10.90
Labor	Kay Hallahan	24,533	32.88	−5.41
Greens	Margo Beilby	3,766	5.05	−0.31
One Nation	Angelo Dacheff	2,035	2.73	−4.46
Christian Democrats	Vivian Hill	1,802	2.41	−0.16
Independent	Margaret Dodd	871	1.17	+1.17
Democrats	Tony Bennell	864	1.16	−2.65
Family First	Bev Custers	756	1.01	+1.01
Citizens Electoral Council	Brian McCarthy	642	0.86	−0.08
Total formal votes		74,623	94.29	−0.57
Informal votes		4,515	5.71	+0.57
Turnout		79,138	93.78	−1.40
Two-party-preferred result
Liberal	Don Randall	44,434	59.54	+9.16
Labor	Kay Hallahan	30,189	40.46	−9.16
Liberal hold		Swing	+9.16	

==== 2001 ====
2001 Australian federal election: Canning
Party	Candidate	Votes	%	±%
Liberal	Don Randall	28,947	41.84	+3.30
Labor	Jane Gerick	26,490	38.29	+0.71
One Nation	Angelo Dacheff	4,976	7.19	−5.64
Greens	Keith Read	3,711	5.36	+1.24
Democrats	Darren Brown	2,639	3.81	+0.16
Christian Democrats	Doug Kennedy	1,779	2.57	+0.85
Citizens Electoral Council	John Macdonald	648	0.94	+0.76
Total formal votes		69,190	94.86	−0.51
Informal votes		3,746	5.14	+0.51
Turnout		72,936	95.72	
Two-party-preferred result
Liberal	Don Randall	34,860	50.38	+0.42
Labor	Jane Gerick	34,330	49.62	−0.42
Liberal gain from Labor		Swing	+0.42	

=== Elections in the 1990s ===
==== 1998 ====
1998 Australian federal election: Canning
Party	Candidate	Votes	%	±%
Labor	Jane Gerick	29,201	40.24	−0.35
Liberal	Ricky Johnston	25,350	34.93	−9.73
One Nation	Colin Taylor	9,823	13.54	+13.54
Greens	Margo Beilby	3,007	4.14	−1.08
Democrats	Dean Craig	2,489	3.43	−2.45
Christian Democrats	Michelle Shave	1,457	2.01	+2.01
Independent	Lance Scott	918	1.27	+1.27
Natural Law	Patti Roberts	185	0.25	−0.14
Citizens Electoral Council	Brian McCarthy	136	0.19	+0.19
Total formal votes		72,566	95.19	−1.16
Informal votes		3,666	4.81	+1.16
Turnout		76,232	95.25	−0.32
Two-party-preferred result
Labor	Jane Gerick	38,834	53.52	+5.16
Liberal	Ricky Johnston	33,732	46.48	−5.16
Labor gain from Liberal		Swing	+5.16	

==== 1996 ====
1996 Australian federal election: Canning
Party	Candidate	Votes	%	±%
Liberal	Ricky Johnston	30,949	44.15	+0.13
Labor	George Gear	28,984	41.35	−3.00
Democrats	Anthony Bloomer	4,332	6.18	+3.62
Greens	Chris Twomey	3,686	5.26	+1.21
Independent	Michael Devereux	1,839	2.62	+2.62
Natural Law	Patti Roberts	307	0.44	+0.05
Total formal votes		70,097	96.39	−1.00
Informal votes		2,625	3.61	+1.00
Turnout		72,722	95.58	−0.34
Two-party-preferred result
Liberal	Ricky Johnston	35,356	50.69	+0.88
Labor	George Gear	34,388	49.31	−0.88
Liberal gain from Labor		Swing	+0.88	

==== 1993 ====
1993 Australian federal election: Canning
Party	Candidate	Votes	%	±%
Labor	George Gear	29,187	44.35	+3.86
Liberal	Ricky Johnston	28,972	44.02	+3.23
Greens	Daniel Bessell	2,663	4.05	−2.94
Democrats	Rosslyn Tilbury	1,688	2.56	−4.76
Call to Australia	Gerard Goiran	1,683	2.56	+2.56
Independent	Shirley de la Hunty	1,372	2.08	+2.08
Natural Law	Patti Roberts	253	0.38	+0.38
Total formal votes		65,818	97.39	+1.73
Informal votes		1,761	2.61	−1.73
Turnout		67,579	95.92	
Two-party-preferred result
Labor	George Gear	33,016	50.19	−1.58
Liberal	Ricky Johnston	32,772	49.81	+1.58
Labor hold		Swing	−1.58	

==== 1990 ====
1990 Australian federal election: Canning
Party	Candidate	Votes	%	±%
Liberal	Ricky Johnston	24,161	40.8	+6.3
Labor	George Gear	23,984	40.5	−11.5
Democrats	Don Bryant	4,340	7.3	+0.7
Greens	Neil Roper	4,139	7.0	+7.0
Grey Power	Arthur Robertson	887	1.5	+1.5
Independent	Phil Hooper	506	0.9	+0.9
Independent	Carol Oats	492	0.8	+0.8
Democratic Socialist	Geoff Spencer	473	0.8	+0.8
Pensioner	Bill Higgins	260	0.4	+0.4
Total formal votes		59,242	95.7	
Informal votes		2,688	4.3	
Turnout		61,930	94.9	
Two-party-preferred result
Labor	George Gear	30,596	51.8	−4.9
Liberal	Ricky Johnston	28,512	48.2	+4.9
Labor hold		Swing	−4.9	

=== Elections in the 1980s ===
==== 1987 ====
1987 Australian federal election: Canning
Party	Candidate	Votes	%	±%
Labor	George Gear	29,223	49.1	−1.5
Liberal	Ricky Johnston	22,247	37.4	−5.8
National	Bob Chapman	4,122	6.9	+6.9
Democrats	Mark Beadle	3,909	6.6	+0.4
Total formal votes		59,501	93.1	
Informal votes		4,394	6.9	
Turnout		63,895	94.2	
Two-party-preferred result
Labor	George Gear	31,985	53.8	+0.0
Liberal	Ricky Johnston	27,496	46.2	+0.0
Labor hold		Swing	+0.0	

==== 1984 ====
1984 Australian federal election: Canning
Party	Candidate	Votes	%	±%
Labor	George Gear	27,415	50.6	−2.4
Liberal	Ricky Johnston	23,430	43.2	+0.5
Democrats	Elizabeth Capill	3,363	6.2	+1.9
Total formal votes		54,208	91.2	
Informal votes		5,216	8.8	
Turnout		59,424	94.7	
Two-party-preferred result
Labor	George Gear	29,174	53.8	−1.8
Liberal	Ricky Johnston	25,031	46.2	+1.8
Labor hold		Swing	−1.8	

==== 1983 ====
1983 Australian federal election: Canning
Party	Candidate	Votes	%	±%
Labor	Wendy Fatin	40,740	54.8	+12.8
Liberal	Mel Bungey	30,410	40.9	−6.4
Democrats	Jean Ritter	3,164	4.3	−5.1
Total formal votes		74,314	98.1	
Informal votes		1,414	1.9	
Turnout		75,728	94.1	
Two-party-preferred result
Labor	Wendy Fatin		57.4	+9.2
Liberal	Mel Bungey		42.6	−9.2
Labor gain from Liberal		Swing	+9.2	

==== 1980 ====
1980 Australian federal election: Canning
Party	Candidate	Votes	%	±%
Liberal	Mel Bungey	31,821	47.3	+0.6
Labor	James Hansen	28,206	42.0	+13.6
Democrats	Theresa Cunningham	6,285	9.4	−0.7
Independent	Pamela Wells	896	1.3	+1.3
Total formal votes		67,208	97.3	
Informal votes		1,839	2.7	
Turnout		69,047	94.1	
Two-party-preferred result
Liberal	Mel Bungey	34,806	51.8	−13.0
Labor	James Hansen	32,402	48.2	+13.0
Liberal hold		Swing	−13.0	

=== Elections in the 1970s ===
==== 1977 ====
1977 Australian federal election: Canning
Party	Candidate	Votes	%	±%
Liberal	Mel Bungey	29,503	48.2	+3.8
Labor	Charles Savage	16,491	26.9	−8.1
National Country	Marie Dilley	7,447	12.2	−8.3
Democrats	Velibor Debeljakovic	6,206	10.1	+10.1
Progress	Douglas Joyce	822	1.3	+1.3
Independent	John English	725	1.2	+1.2
Total formal votes		61,194	96.2	
Informal votes		2,389	3.8	
Turnout		63,583	95.5	
Two-party-preferred result
Liberal	Mel Bungey		66.3	+3.1
Labor	Charles Savage		33.7	−3.1
Liberal hold		Swing	+3.1	

==== 1975 ====
1975 Australian federal election: Canning
Party	Candidate	Votes	%	±%
Liberal	Mel Bungey	28,002	46.9	+11.2
Labor	Marilyn Anthony	17,916	30.0	−0.6
National Country	John Hallett	13,748	23.0	−8.7
Total formal votes		59,666	97.9	
Informal votes		1,288	2.1	
Turnout		60,954	95.8	
Two-party-preferred result
Liberal	Mel Bungey	40,721	68.2	+3.9
Labor	Marilyn Anthony	18,945	31.8	+31.8
Liberal hold		Swing	+3.9	

==== 1974 ====
1974 Australian federal election: Canning
Party	Candidate	Votes	%	±%
Liberal	Mel Bungey	19,133	35.7	+8.8
National Alliance	John Hallett	16,961	31.7	−2.9
Labor	James Laffer	16,378	30.6	−3.2
Australia	John Duncan	1,093	2.0	−0.4
Total formal votes		53,565	97.4	
Informal votes		1,427	2.6	
Turnout		54,992	95.7	
Two-party-preferred result
Liberal	Mel Bungey	34,417	64.3	+64.3
National Alliance	John Hallett	19,148	35.7	−26.1
Liberal gain from National Alliance		Swing	+26.1	

==== 1972 ====
1972 Australian federal election: Canning
Party	Candidate	Votes	%	±%
Labor	Allan Scott	23,398	39.6	−2.6
Liberal	Ian Pratt	15,873	26.9	+4.6
Country	John Hallett	15,461	26.2	−3.9
Democratic Labor	Patrick Hickey	1,558	2.6	−2.8
Australia	Thomas Hartigan	1,436	2.4	+2.4
Independent	Brian Burns	1,301	2.2	+2.2
Total formal votes		59,027	96.2	
Informal votes		2,335	3.8	
Turnout		61,362	94.6	
Two-party-preferred result
Country	John Hallett	33,032	56.0	+1.2
Labor	Allan Scott	25,995	44.0	−1.2
Country hold		Swing	+1.2	

=== Elections in the 1960s ===
==== 1969 ====
1969 Australian federal election: Canning
Party	Candidate	Votes	%	±%
Labor	Allan Scott	20,245	42.2	+15.6
Country	John Hallett	14,445	30.1	−13.0
Liberal	Harry Pennington	10,722	22.3	−2.3
Democratic Labor	Maurice Bailey	2,617	5.4	+0.0
Total formal votes		48,029	97.0	
Informal votes		1,506	3.0	
Turnout		49,535	95.5	
Two-party-preferred result
Country	John Hallett	26,318	54.8	−15.4
Labor	Allan Scott	21,711	45.2	+15.4
Country hold		Swing	−15.4	

==== 1966 ====
1966 Australian federal election: Canning
Party	Candidate	Votes	%	±%
Country	John Hallett	17,709	43.0	+15.3
Labor	Charles Edwards	11,110	27.0	+0.9
Liberal	Norman Snow	10,119	24.6	−18.9
Democratic Labor	Bryan Finlay	2,227	5.4	+5.4
Total formal votes		41,165	95.5	
Informal votes		1,951	4.5	
Turnout		43,116	95.2	
Two-party-preferred result
Country	John Hallett	28,736	69.8	+17.6
Labor	Charles Edwards	12,429	30.2	+30.2
Country hold		Swing	+17.6	

==== 1963 ====
1963 Australian federal election: Canning
Party	Candidate	Votes	%	±%
Liberal	Neil McNeill	17,000	43.5	+5.3
Country	John Hallett	10,844	27.7	−0.2
Labor	Charles Edwards	10,204	26.1	−3.1
Independent	Ronald Batey	1,072	2.7	+2.7
Total formal votes		39,120	97.7	
Informal votes		922	2.3	
Turnout		40,042	95.9	
Two-party-preferred result
Country	John Hallett	20,434	52.2	+52.2
Liberal	Neil McNeill	18,686	47.8	−17.9
Country gain from Liberal		Swing	+17.9	

==== 1961 ====
1961 Australian federal election: Canning
Party	Candidate	Votes	%	±%
Liberal	Neil McNeill	13,931	38.2	+38.2
Labor	Charles Edwards	10,659	29.2	+29.2
Country	John Hallett	10,168	27.9	−44.4
Democratic Labor	Stanley Meredith	1,706	4.7	−22.9
Total formal votes		36,464	96.0	
Informal votes		1,525	4.0	
Turnout		37,989	95.5	
Two-party-preferred result
Liberal	Neil McNeill	23,943	65.7	+65.7
Labor	Charles Edwards	12,521	34.3	+34.3
Liberal gain from Country		Swing	+65.7	

=== Elections in the 1950s ===
==== 1958 ====
1958 Australian federal election: Canning
Party	Candidate	Votes	%	±%
Country	Len Hamilton	24,763	72.4	−27.6
Democratic Labor	Patrick Cranley	9,447	27.6	+27.6
Total formal votes		34,210	94.7	
Informal votes		1,930	5.3	
Turnout		36,140	95.0	
Country hold		Swing	−27.6	

==== 1955 ====
1955 Australian federal election: Canning
Party	Candidate	Votes	%	±%
Country	Len Hamilton	unopposed		
Country hold		Swing		

==== 1954 ====
1954 Australian federal election: Canning
Party	Candidate	Votes	%	±%
Country	Len Hamilton	23,196	61.2	−3.4
Labor	Percy Munday	14,714	38.8	+3.4
Total formal votes		37,910	97.8	
Informal votes		856	2.2	
Turnout		38,766	96.5	
Country hold		Swing	−3.4	

==== 1951 ====
1951 Australian federal election: Canning
Party	Candidate	Votes	%	±%
Country	Len Hamilton	22,012	64.6	+27.8
Labor	Percy Munday	12,057	35.4	+5.1
Total formal votes		34,069	97.1	
Informal votes		1,018	2.9	
Turnout		35,087	96.0	
Country hold		Swing	+11.1	

=== Elections in the 1940s ===
==== 1949 ====
1949 Australian federal election: Canning
Party	Candidate	Votes	%	±%
Country	Len Hamilton	12,159	36.8	−20.1
Liberal	William Gillespie	10,244	31.0	+31.0
Labor	Thomas Scaddan	10,002	30.3	−12.8
Independent Country	Arthur Neville	594	1.8	+1.8
Total formal votes		32,999	97.5	
Informal votes		842	2.5	
Turnout		33,841	95.6	
Two-party-preferred result
Country	Len Hamilton	17,640	53.5	−3.4
Liberal	William Gillespie	15,359	46.5	+46.5
Country notional hold		Swing	−3.4	
