= Results of the 1998 Australian federal election in Western Australia =

Results of the 1998 Australian election in Western Australia

1998 Australian federal election (Western Australia)
← 1996	3 October 1998	2001 →

All 14 Western Australian seats in the Australian House of Representatives and 6 seats in the Australian Senate
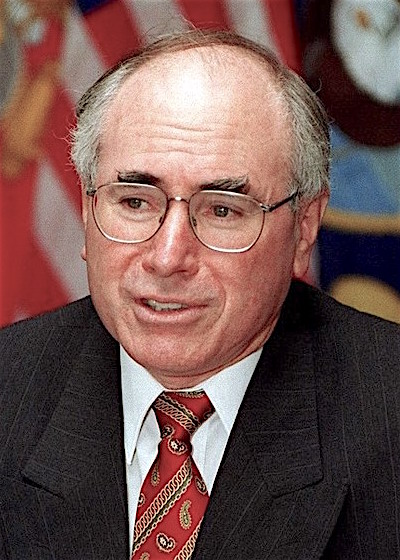

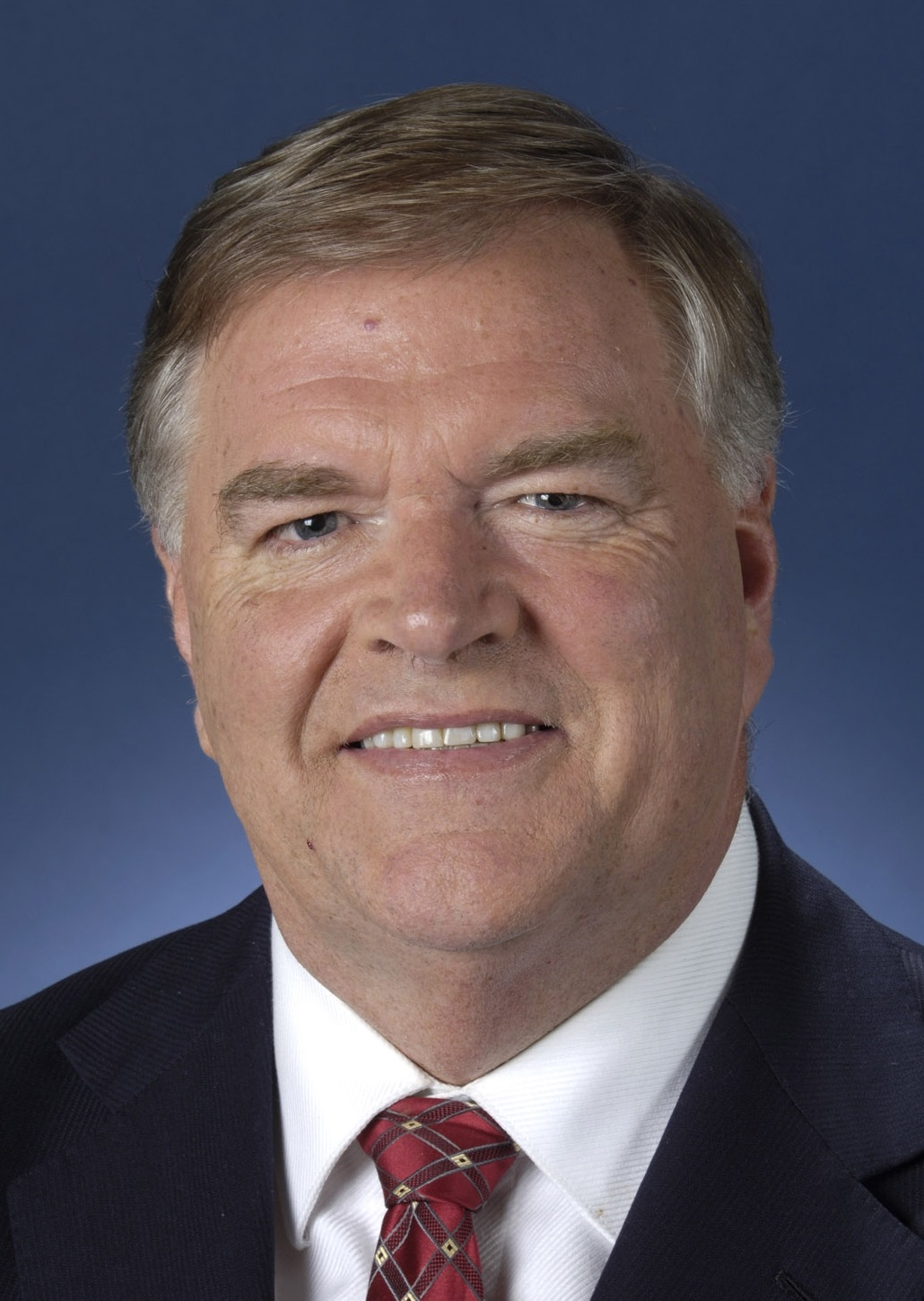
	First party	Second party
Leader	John Howard	Kim Beazley
Party	Liberal/National coalition	Labor
Last election	8 seats	3 seats
Seats won	7	7
Seat change	▼1	▲4
Popular vote	411,432	377,545
Percentage	39.5%	36.2%
Swing	▼5.9	▲1.5
TPP	50.54%	49.46%
TPP swing	▼5.46	▲5.46

This is a list of electoral division results for the 1998 Australian federal election in the state of Western Australia.

== Overall results ==
Turnout 94.7% (CV) — Informal 4.2%
Party	Votes	%	Swing	Seats	Change
Liberal	397,836	38.15	-5.87	7	▼1
National	13,596	1.30	-0.03		Steady
Liberal/National Coalition	411,432	39.46	-5.90	7	▼1
Labor	377,545	36.21	1.48	7	▲4
One Nation	96,708	9.27	9.27		
Greens	52,674	5.05	-0.26		
Democrats	41,364	3.97	-1.61		
Independents	31,980	3.07	-5.71		▼3
Australia First	18,828	1.81	1.81		
Christian Democrats	8,336	0.80	0.80		
Citizens Electoral Council	1,541	0.15	0.15		
Natural Law	951	0.09	-0.16		
Democratic Socialist	682	0.07	0.07		
Abolish Child Support	413	0.04	0.04		
Unity	321	0.03	0.03		
Total	1,042,775			14	
Two-party-preferred vote
Liberal/National Coalition	527,042	50.54	-5.46	7	▼1
Labor	515,733	49.46	+5.46	7	▲4
Invalid/blank votes	45,509	4.18	+1.02		
Turnout	1,088,284	94.66			
Registered voters	1,149,619				
Source: Federal Elections 1998

=== Brand ===
1998 Australian federal election: Brand
Party	Candidate	Votes	%	±%
Labor	Kim Beazley	36,391	52.00	+7.65
Liberal	Rick Palmer	19,413	27.74	−14.01
One Nation	Lee Dawson	8,308	11.87	+11.87
Greens	Nick Dunlop	2,012	2.88	−1.62
Democrats	Collin Mullane	1,630	2.33	−1.44
Christian Democrats	Graham Lawn	402	0.57	+0.57
Independent	Kate Dorrington	399	0.57	+0.57
Natural Law	Anne Leishman	343	0.49	+0.49
Independent	Paul Roth	310	0.44	+0.44
Independent	Kent Reynolds	308	0.44	+0.44
Australia First	Carolyn Gent	296	0.42	+0.42
Abolish Child Support	Ron Higgins	167	0.24	+0.24
Total formal votes		69,979	94.54	−2.20
Informal votes		4,043	5.46	+2.20
Turnout		74,022	95.35	+0.15
Two-party-preferred result
Labor	Kim Beazley	43,587	62.29	+11.44
Liberal	Rick Palmer	26,392	37.71	−11.44
Labor hold		Swing	+11.44	

=== Canning ===
1998 Australian federal election: Canning
Party	Candidate	Votes	%	±%
Labor	Jane Gerick	29,201	40.24	−0.35
Liberal	Ricky Johnston	25,350	34.93	−9.73
One Nation	Colin Taylor	9,823	13.54	+13.54
Greens	Margo Beilby	3,007	4.14	−1.08
Democrats	Dean Craig	2,489	3.43	−2.45
Christian Democrats	Michelle Shave	1,457	2.01	+2.01
Independent	Lance Scott	918	1.27	+1.27
Natural Law	Patti Roberts	185	0.25	−0.14
Citizens Electoral Council	Brian McCarthy	136	0.19	+0.19
Total formal votes		72,566	95.19	−1.16
Informal votes		3,666	4.81	+1.16
Turnout		76,232	95.25	−0.32
Two-party-preferred result
Labor	Jane Gerick	38,834	53.52	+5.16
Liberal	Ricky Johnston	33,732	46.48	−5.16
Labor gain from Liberal		Swing	+5.16	

=== Cowan ===
1998 Australian federal election: Cowan
Party	Candidate	Votes	%	±%
Labor	Graham Edwards	31,312	43.89	+4.19
Liberal	Richard Evans	27,797	38.96	−6.25
One Nation	Ron Holt	5,777	8.10	+8.10
Democrats	Craig Wakeford	2,847	3.99	−3.35
Greens	Miguel Costello	2,760	3.87	−0.46
Christian Democrats	Phillip Hayes	850	1.19	+1.19
Total formal votes		71,343	96.14	−0.32
Informal votes		2,863	3.86	+0.32
Turnout		74,206	96.14	+0.21
Two-party-preferred result
Labor	Graham Edwards	38,208	53.56	+7.62
Liberal	Richard Evans	33,135	46.44	−7.62
Labor gain from Liberal		Swing	+7.62	

=== Curtin ===
1998 Australian federal election: Curtin
Party	Candidate	Votes	%	±%
Liberal	Julie Bishop	35,174	44.63	+2.69
Labor	Andrew Waddell	18,026	22.87	+2.32
Independent	Allan Rocher	13,925	17.67	−8.06
Greens	Phillip Farren	4,971	6.31	+0.07
Democrats	Stephen Lipple	3,780	4.80	+0.38
One Nation	Ian Trinder	2,934	3.72	+3.72
Total formal votes		78,810	97.22	−0.73
Informal votes		2,255	2.78	+0.73
Turnout		81,065	94.42	−0.83
Two-party-preferred result
Liberal	Julie Bishop	49,870	63.28	+0.06
Labor	Andrew Waddell	28,940	36.72	−0.06
Liberal gain from Independent		Swing	+0.06	

=== Forrest ===
1998 Australian federal election: Forrest
Party	Candidate	Votes	%	±%
Liberal	Geoff Prosser	32,171	42.78	−14.34
Labor	Tony Dean	20,332	27.04	−1.67
One Nation	Paddy Embry	10,029	13.34	+13.34
Greens	Paul Llewellyn	5,303	7.05	−0.42
National	Steve Thomas	2,354	3.13	+3.13
Democrats	Alf Denman	2,253	3.00	−2.13
Christian Democrats	Jim Cummins	1,316	1.75	+1.75
Australia First	Ted Stone	897	1.19	+1.19
	Jon Doust	424	0.56	+0.56
Citizens Electoral Council	John Watson	117	0.16	+0.16
Total formal votes		75,196	94.90	−2.43
Informal votes		4,037	5.10	+2.43
Turnout		79,233	95.85	−0.04
Two-party-preferred result
Liberal	Geoff Prosser	42,775	56.88	−7.21
Labor	Tony Dean	32,421	43.12	+7.21
Liberal hold		Swing	−7.21	

=== Fremantle ===
1998 Australian federal election: Fremantle
Party	Candidate	Votes	%	±%
Labor	Carmen Lawrence	36,631	47.45	+0.72
Liberal	Mick Tiller	25,051	32.45	−8.07
One Nation	Tony Hill	5,834	7.56	+7.56
Greens	Leonie Deegan	5,281	6.84	−0.03
Democrats	Jakica Zaknic	3,450	4.47	−1.40
Independent	Lawrence Shave	957	1.24	+1.24
Total formal votes		77,204	95.94	−0.57
Informal votes		3,269	4.06	+0.57
Turnout		80,473	94.88	−0.86
Two-party-preferred result
Labor	Carmen Lawrence	46,338	60.02	+5.81
Liberal	Mick Tiller	30,866	39.98	−5.81
Labor hold		Swing	+5.81	

=== Kalgoorlie ===
1998 Australian federal election: Kalgoorlie
Party	Candidate	Votes	%	±%
Liberal	Barry Haase	19,169	28.03	+1.43
Labor	Clark Butson	18,890	27.62	−6.11
Australia First	Graeme Campbell	15,585	22.79	+22.79
One Nation	Neville Smith	5,737	8.39	+8.39
National	Kathy Finlayson	4,088	5.98	+4.78
Greens	Robin Chapple	2,899	4.24	+0.51
Democrats	Dean Richter	1,367	2.00	−0.18
Christian Democrats	Laurie Sugg	466	0.68	+0.68
Citizens Electoral Council	Ian Burt	185	0.27	+0.27
Total formal votes		68,386	95.35	−1.87
Informal votes		3,335	4.65	+1.87
Turnout		71,721	86.97	−1.86
Two-party-preferred result
Liberal	Barry Haase	35,632	52.10	+2.80
Labor	Clark Butson	32,754	47.90	−2.80
Liberal gain from Independent		Swing	+2.80	

=== Moore ===
1998 Australian federal election: Moore
Party	Candidate	Votes	%	±%
Liberal	Mal Washer	24,754	34.38	+8.00
Labor	Christine Power	21,743	30.20	+0.64
Independent	Paul Filing	14,739	20.47	−13.26
One Nation	Allison Walker	4,943	6.87	+6.87
Greens	Steve Magyar	3,209	4.46	+0.22
Democrats	Patti Lock	2,611	3.63	−1.01
Total formal votes		71,999	96.97	−0.61
Informal votes		2,248	3.03	+0.61
Turnout		74,247	95.71	−0.11
Two-party-preferred result
Liberal	Mal Washer	38,973	54.13	−4.40
Labor	Christine Power	33,026	45.87	+4.40
Liberal gain from Independent		Swing	−4.40	

=== O'Connor ===
1998 Australian federal election: O'Connor
Party	Candidate	Votes	%	±%
Liberal	Wilson Tuckey	35,383	46.48	−6.92
Labor	Frank Marciano	16,877	22.17	−0.93
One Nation	Frank Hough	10,449	13.73	+13.73
National	Jenny Fowler	6,137	8.06	−7.25
Greens	Mark Douglas	2,845	3.74	+0.27
Democrats	Hannah McGlade	1,799	2.36	−0.93
Christian Democrats	Mac Forsyth	1,343	1.76	+1.76
Australia First	Ian Stiles	1,054	1.38	+1.38
Citizens Electoral Council	Stuart Smith	231	0.30	+0.30
Total formal votes		76,118	95.16	−1.63
Informal votes		3,873	4.84	+1.63
Turnout		79,991	95.33	+0.21
Two-party-preferred result
Liberal	Wilson Tuckey	49,581	65.14	−6.02
Labor	Frank Marciano	26,537	34.86	+6.02
Liberal hold		Swing	−6.02	

=== Pearce ===
1998 Australian federal election: Pearce
Party	Candidate	Votes	%	±%
Liberal	Judi Moylan	32,475	43.54	−11.41
Labor	Paul Andrews	22,751	30.51	+2.85
One Nation	David Gunnyon	9,381	12.58	+12.58
Greens	Keith Schekkerman	4,420	5.93	−0.95
Democrats	Barbara Moxham	4,248	5.70	−3.96
National	Roger Cooper	1,017	1.36	+0.59
Citizens Electoral Council	John Burt	288	0.39	+0.39
Total formal votes		74,580	96.36	−0.65
Informal votes		2,820	3.64	+0.65
Turnout		77,400	95.25	−0.63
Two-party-preferred result
Liberal	Judi Moylan	41,246	55.30	−8.29
Labor	Paul Andrews	33,334	44.70	+8.29
Liberal hold		Swing	−8.29	

=== Perth ===
1998 Australian federal election: Perth
Party	Candidate	Votes	%	±%
Labor	Stephen Smith	38,395	50.16	+2.89
Liberal	David Montani	22,689	29.64	−8.66
One Nation	Kerry Mills	6,555	8.56	+8.56
Greens	Gemma Carter	4,713	6.16	+0.24
Democrats	Brendon Entrekin	3,517	4.59	−1.72
Democratic Socialist	Iggy Kim	682	0.89	+0.89
Total formal votes		76,551	96.11	−0.03
Informal votes		3,102	3.89	+0.03
Turnout		79,653	94.32	+0.37
Two-party-preferred result
Labor	Stephen Smith	48,441	63.28	+6.60
Liberal	David Montani	28,110	36.72	−6.60
Labor hold		Swing	+6.60	

=== Stirling ===
1998 Australian federal election: Stirling
Party	Candidate	Votes	%	±%
Liberal	Eoin Cameron	32,015	41.71	−3.48
Labor	Jann McFarlane	30,994	40.38	+2.28
One Nation	John Evans	5,096	6.64	+6.64
Greens	Mark Lockett	3,820	4.98	−0.38
Democrats	Peter Markham	3,303	4.30	−0.91
Australia First	Elaine McNeill	996	1.30	+1.30
Unity	Bronislaw Tabaczynski	321	0.42	+0.42
Natural Law	Leanne Hillel	213	0.28	−0.20
Total formal votes		76,758	95.06	−1.26
Informal votes		3,993	4.94	+1.26
Turnout		80,751	95.27	+0.28
Two-party-preferred result
Labor	Jann McFarlane	39,176	51.04	+4.26
Liberal	Eoin Cameron	37,582	48.96	−4.26
Labor gain from Liberal		Swing	+4.26	

=== Swan ===
1998 Australian federal election: Swan
Party	Candidate	Votes	%	±%
Labor	Kim Wilkie	30,481	40.09	+3.10
Liberal	Don Randall	29,848	39.26	−3.55
One Nation	Richard Birchall	6,278	8.26	+8.26
Greens	Juanita Miller	3,892	5.12	+0.27
Democrats	Tim Fraser	3,720	4.89	−0.88
Christian Democrats	Brett Crook	1,018	1.34	+1.34
Citizens Electoral Council	Malcolm Talbot	584	0.77	+0.77
Natural Law	Elspeth Clairs	210	0.28	−0.05
Total formal votes		76,031	95.71	−0.68
Informal votes		3,404	4.29	+0.68
Turnout		79,435	95.05	+0.52
Two-party-preferred result
Labor	Kim Wilkie	40,067	52.70	+6.33
Liberal	Don Randall	35,964	47.30	−6.33
Labor gain from Liberal		Swing	+6.33	

=== Tangney ===
1998 Australian federal election: Tangney
Party	Candidate	Votes	%	±%
Liberal	Daryl Williams	36,547	47.31	−7.62
Labor	Martin Whitely	25,521	33.04	+2.18
One Nation	Raymond O'Dwyer	5,564	7.20	+7.20
Democrats	Geoff Taylor	4,350	5.63	−2.95
Greens	Joshua Byrne	3,542	4.58	−0.35
Christian Democrats	Suryan Chandrasegaran	1,484	1.92	+1.92
Abolish Child Support	Manny Goldberg	246	0.32	+0.32
Total formal votes		77,254	96.74	−0.34
Informal votes		2,601	3.26	+0.34
Turnout		79,855	95.70	−0.31
Two-party-preferred result
Liberal	Daryl Williams	43,184	55.90	−5.96
Labor	Martin Whitely	34,070	44.10	+5.96
Liberal hold		Swing	−5.96	

== See also ==
- Results of the 1998 Australian federal election (House of Representatives)
- Members of the Australian House of Representatives, 1998–2001
