= Results of the 2001 Australian federal election in Western Australia =

2001 Australian federal election (Western Australia)
← 1998	10 November 2001	2004 →

All 15 Western Australian seats in the Australian House of Representatives and 6 seats in the Australian Senate
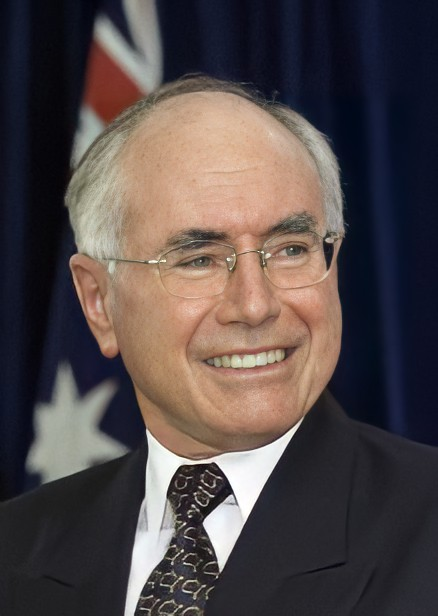

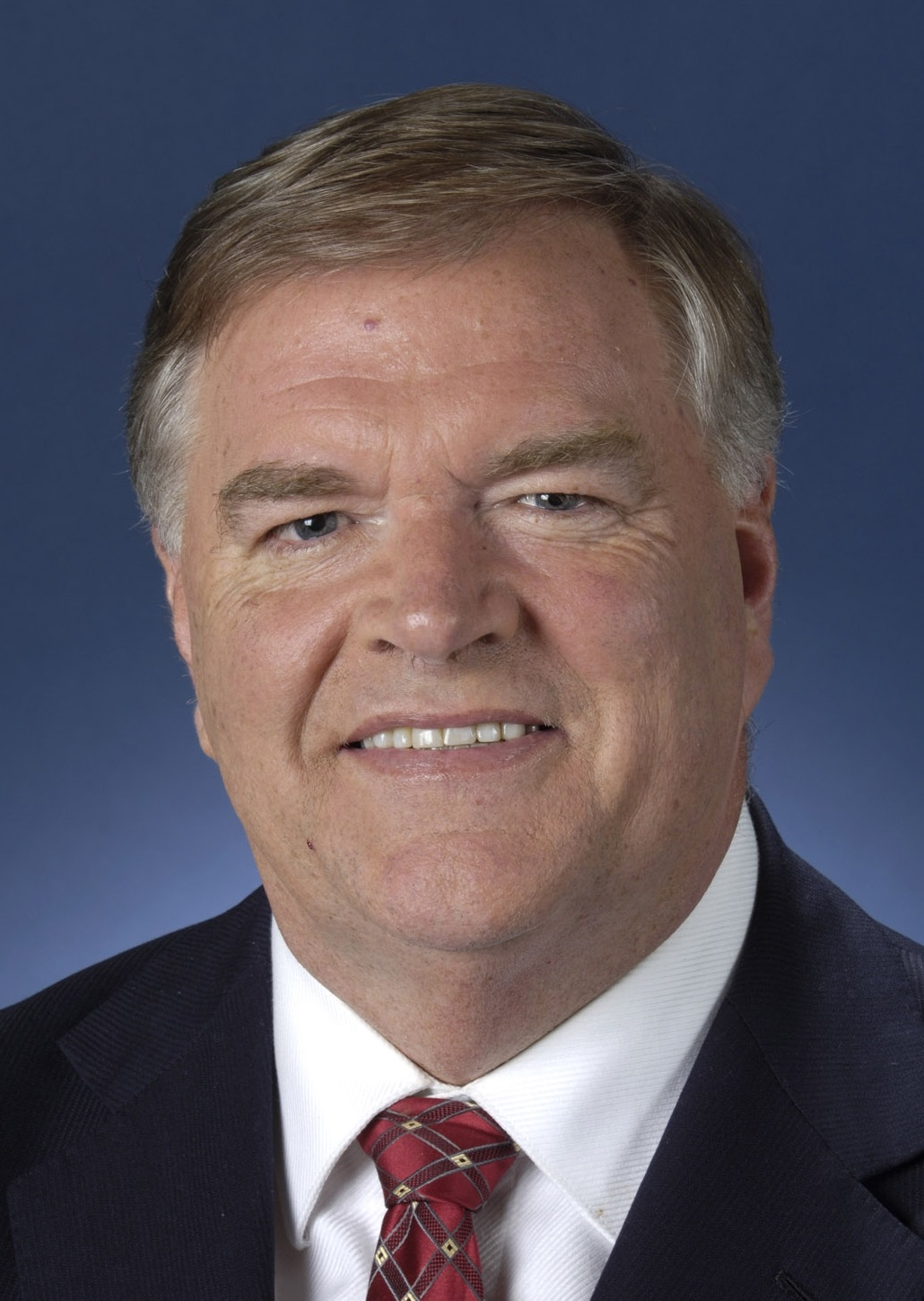
	First party	Second party
Leader	John Howard	Kim Beazley
Party	Liberal/National coalition	Labor
Last election	7 seats	7 seats
Seats won	8 seats	7 seats
Seat change	▲1	Steady
Popular vote	449,036	402,927
Percentage	41.39%	37.14%
Swing	▲3.24	▼0.29
TPP	51.62%	48.38%
TPP swing	▲1.08	▼1.08

This is a list of electoral division results for the Australian 2001 federal election in the state of Western Australia.

== Overall results ==
Turnout 99.60% (CV) — Informal 3.40%
Party	Votes	%	Swing	Seats	Change
Liberal	449,036	41.39	+3.24	8	▲1
Labor	402,927	37.14	-0.29	7	Steady
One Nation	67,992	6.27	-3.01		
Greens	64,939	5.99	+0.93		
Democrats	50,581	4.66	+0.70		
Liberals for Forests	13,116	1.21			
Christian Democrats	12,792	1.18			
National	11,052	1.02			
Independent	6,957	0.64			
Citizens Electoral Council	2,907	0.27			
Curtin Labor Alliance	2,496	0.23			
Total	1,084,795			15	▲1
Two-party-preferred vote
Liberal	559,926	51.62	1.08	8	▲1
Labor	524,869	48.38	-1.08	7	Steady

== Results by division ==
=== Brand ===
2001 Australian federal election: Brand
Party	Candidate	Votes	%	±%
Labor	Kim Beazley	36,917	51.71	−1.38
Liberal	Margaret Thomas	17,110	23.97	−2.47
Liberals for Forests	Keith Woollard	8,006	11.21	+11.21
One Nation	Steve Robbie	4,380	6.14	−5.82
Greens	Kate Davis	2,486	3.48	+0.58
Democrats	Paul Hubbard	1,706	2.39	−2.47
Christian Democrats	Terry Iredale	621	0.87	+0.29
Citizens Electoral Council	Brian McCarthy	164	0.23	+0.23
Total formal votes		71,390	95.69	+1.17
Informal votes		3,214	4.31	−1.17
Turnout		74,604	95.98	
Two-party-preferred result
Labor	Kim Beazley	42,869	60.05	−3.32
Liberal	Margaret Thomas	28,521	39.95	+3.32
Labor hold		Swing	−3.32	

=== Canning ===
2001 Australian federal election: Canning
Party	Candidate	Votes	%	±%
Liberal	Don Randall	28,947	41.84	+3.30
Labor	Jane Gerick	26,490	38.29	+0.71
One Nation	Angelo Dacheff	4,976	7.19	−5.64
Greens	Keith Read	3,711	5.36	+1.24
Democrats	Darren Brown	2,639	3.81	+0.16
Christian Democrats	Doug Kennedy	1,779	2.57	+0.85
Citizens Electoral Council	John Macdonald	648	0.94	+0.76
Total formal votes		69,190	94.86	−0.51
Informal votes		3,746	5.14	+0.51
Turnout		72,936	95.72	
Two-party-preferred result
Liberal	Don Randall	34,860	50.38	+0.42
Labor	Jane Gerick	34,330	49.62	−0.42
Liberal gain from Labor		Swing	+0.42	

=== Cowan ===
2001 Australian federal election: Cowan
Party	Candidate	Votes	%	±%
Labor	Graham Edwards	34,703	47.75	+4.14
Liberal	Andre Shannon	26,250	36.12	−2.72
One Nation	Ron Holt	4,130	5.68	−2.39
Democrats	Tracy Chaloner	3,111	4.28	+0.34
Greens	Dave Fort	2,951	4.06	+0.16
Christian Democrats	Paul Salmon	1,117	1.54	+0.36
National	Sue Metcalf	410	0.56	+0.56
Total formal votes		72,672	95.33	−0.84
Informal votes		3,564	4.67	+0.84
Turnout		76,236	96.06	
Two-party-preferred result
Labor	Graham Edwards	40,341	55.51	+2.40
Liberal	Andre Shannon	32,331	44.49	−2.40
Labor hold		Swing	+2.40	

=== Curtin ===
2001 Australian federal election: Curtin
Party	Candidate	Votes	%	±%
Liberal	Julie Bishop	41,863	55.16	+10.59
Labor	Trish Fowler	17,789	23.44	+0.69
Greens	Steve Walker	7,019	9.25	+2.93
Democrats	Ashley Buckley	4,863	6.41	+1.60
One Nation	Neil Gilmour	1,840	2.42	−1.28
Liberals for Forests	G. Wood	1,750	2.31	+2.31
Christian Democrats	Karen McDonald	763	1.01	+1.01
Total formal votes		75,887	96.70	−0.57
Informal votes		2,590	3.30	+0.57
Turnout		78,477	95.65	
Two-party-preferred result
Liberal	Julie Bishop	48,502	63.91	+0.43
Labor	Trish Fowler	27,385	36.09	−0.43
Liberal hold		Swing	+0.43	

=== Forrest ===
2001 Australian federal election: Forrest
Party	Candidate	Votes	%	±%
Liberal	Geoff Prosser	34,392	46.03	+3.79
Labor	Tresslyn Smith	22,872	30.61	−0.10
One Nation	Alan Giorgi	7,510	10.05	−1.88
Greens	Paul Llewellyn	5,359	7.17	+1.07
Democrats	Alison Wylie	2,477	3.31	+0.27
National	Charles Caldwell	1,397	1.87	−1.09
Curtin Labor Alliance	Megan Kirwan	433	0.58	+0.58
Citizens Electoral Council	Arthur Harvey	281	0.38	+0.25
Total formal votes		74,721	94.95	+0.08
Informal votes		3,976	5.05	−0.08
Turnout		78,697	96.36	
Two-party-preferred result
Liberal	Geoff Prosser	43,049	57.61	+3.01
Labor	Tresslyn Smith	31,672	42.39	−3.01
Liberal hold		Swing	+3.01	

=== Fremantle ===
2001 Australian federal election: Fremantle
Party	Candidate	Votes	%	±%
Labor	Carmen Lawrence	34,054	47.01	−2.33
Liberal	Louise Smyth	22,025	30.40	+0.08
Greens	Robert Delves	6,565	9.06	+2.07
One Nation	Chris Reynolds	4,308	5.95	−1.75
Democrats	Rod Swift	3,878	5.35	+0.91
Christian Democrats	Michelle Shave	1,025	1.41	+1.41
	Sarah Harris	588	0.81	+0.81
Total formal votes		72,443	94.28	−1.50
Informal votes		4,393	5.72	+1.50
Turnout		76,836	95.42	
Two-party-preferred result
Labor	Carmen Lawrence	43,952	60.72	−1.57
Liberal	Louise Smyth	28,491	39.28	+1.57
Labor hold		Swing	−1.57	

=== Hasluck ===
2001 Australian federal election: Hasluck
Party	Candidate	Votes	%	±%
Liberal	Bethwyn Chan	27,660	39.33	+2.49
Labor	Sharryn Jackson	26,890	38.23	−1.15
One Nation	James Hopkinson	4,920	7.00	−4.72
Greens	Luke Edmonds	3,986	5.67	+0.86
Democrats	Peter Markham	3,455	4.91	+0.08
Christian Democrats	Terry Ryan	1,695	2.41	+1.37
Citizens Electoral Council	Ronnie McLean	804	1.14	+0.89
Curtin Labor Alliance	Michael Daniels	520	0.74	+0.74
National	Ros Hegarty	401	0.57	+0.24
Total formal votes		70,331	94.20	−1.43
Informal votes		4,334	5.80	+1.43
Turnout		74,665	95.75	
Two-party-preferred result
Labor	Sharryn Jackson	36,420	51.78	−0.77
Liberal	Bethwyn Chan	33,911	48.22	+0.77
Labor notional hold		Swing	−0.77	

=== Kalgoorlie ===
2001 Australian federal election: Kalgoorlie
Party	Candidate	Votes	%	±%
Liberal	Barry Haase	28,810	42.60	+14.57
Labor	Paul Browning	23,712	35.06	+7.44
One Nation	Robin Scott	5,818	8.60	+0.21
Greens	Laurie Miller	2,554	3.78	−0.46
Democrats	Don Hoddy	2,383	3.52	+1.52
Independent	Clark Butson	1,947	2.88	+2.88
National	Peter McCumstie	1,379	2.04	−3.94
Independent	Neville Smith	474	0.70	+0.70
Curtin Labor Alliance	Ian Burt	447	0.66	+0.66
Citizens Electoral Council	Callum Payne	111	0.16	−0.11
Total formal votes		67,635	94.40	−0.95
Informal votes		4,010	5.60	+0.95
Turnout		71,645	86.84	
Two-party-preferred result
Liberal	Barry Haase	36,755	54.34	+2.24
Labor	Paul Browning	30,880	45.66	−2.24
Liberal hold		Swing	+2.24	

=== Moore ===
2001 Australian federal election: Moore
Party	Candidate	Votes	%	±%
Liberal	Mal Washer	33,302	48.99	+11.76
Labor	Kim Young	22,888	33.67	+3.96
Greens	Andrew Roy	3,683	5.42	+0.82
Democrats	Clive Oliver	3,391	4.99	+1.13
One Nation	John Evans	3,078	4.53	−1.83
Independent	Geof Henderson	1,640	2.41	+2.41
Total formal votes		67,982	96.04	−0.97
Informal votes		2,802	3.96	+0.97
Turnout		70,784	95.96	
Two-party-preferred result
Liberal	Mal Washer	38,096	56.04	+0.42
Labor	Kim Young	29,886	43.96	−0.42
Liberal hold		Swing	+0.42	

=== O'Connor ===
2001 Australian federal election: O'Connor
Party	Candidate	Votes	%	±%
Liberal	Wilson Tuckey	36,867	49.48	+2.59
Labor	Mark Pendlebury	14,742	19.78	+0.56
One Nation	Ron McLean	8,774	11.77	−3.19
National	Vicki Brown	5,480	7.35	−0.03
Greens	Sandy Davis	3,525	4.73	−0.29
Christian Democrats	Alistair McNabb	1,611	2.16	−0.02
Democrats	Carole Pestana	1,502	2.02	−0.32
Liberals for Forests	Donna Selby	1,167	1.57	+1.57
Independent	Stephan Gyorgy	509	0.68	+0.68
Citizens Electoral Council	Terry Iturbide	338	0.45	+0.18
Total formal votes		74,515	94.08	−1.19
Informal votes		4,693	5.92	+1.19
Turnout		79,208	95.88	
Two-party-preferred result
Liberal	Wilson Tuckey	51,484	69.09	+2.52
Labor	Mark Pendlebury	23,031	30.91	−2.52
Liberal hold		Swing	+2.52	

=== Pearce ===
2001 Australian federal election: Pearce
Party	Candidate	Votes	%	±%
Liberal	Judi Moylan	31,509	44.83	+4.45
Labor	Liam Costello	21,306	30.32	+1.12
One Nation	Ken Collins	6,105	8.69	−4.36
Greens	Juanita Miller	5,072	7.22	+1.86
Democrats	Jack Fox	3,147	4.48	−0.04
National	Chris Nelson	1,985	2.82	+0.12
Christian Democrats	Vivian Hill	858	1.22	+1.11
Citizens Electoral Council	Stuart Smith	299	0.43	+0.05
Total formal votes		70,281	95.02	−1.22
Informal votes		3,682	4.98	+1.22
Turnout		73,963	95.33	
Two-party-preferred result
Liberal	Judi Moylan		56.87	+1.68
Labor	Liam Costello		43.13	−1.68
Liberal hold		Swing	+1.68	

=== Perth ===
2001 Australian federal election: Perth
Party	Candidate	Votes	%	±%
Labor	Stephen Smith	35,389	47.88	−1.88
Liberal	Rod Webb	23,894	32.33	+1.95
Greens	Alison Xamon	5,437	7.36	+1.27
Democrats	Aaron Hewett	5,381	7.28	+2.63
One Nation	Peter Gilberthorpe	3,244	4.39	−3.81
	Philip Chilton	568	0.77	+0.77
Total formal votes		73,913	94.98	−1.18
Informal votes		3,907	5.02	+1.18
Turnout		77,820	95.25	
Two-party-preferred result
Labor	Stephen Smith	45,239	61.21	−1.33
Liberal	Rod Webb	28,674	38.79	+1.33
Labor hold		Swing	−1.33	

=== Stirling ===
2001 Australian federal election: Stirling
Party	Candidate	Votes	%	±%
Labor	Jann McFarlane	31,774	41.24	+0.39
Liberal	Bob Cronin	30,963	40.19	−0.69
Greens	Heather Aquilina	4,608	5.98	+1.03
Democrats	Pat Olver	4,572	5.93	+1.65
One Nation	Keith Thorogood	3,041	3.95	−2.66
Liberals for Forests	Perry Jasper	1,071	1.39	+1.39
Christian Democrats	Keith McEncroe	1,022	1.33	+1.33
Total formal votes		77,051	94.60	−0.37
Informal votes		4,395	5.40	+0.37
Turnout		81,446	95.22	
Two-party-preferred result
Labor	Jann McFarlane	39,740	51.58	−0.58
Liberal	Bob Cronin	37,311	48.42	+0.58
Labor hold		Swing	−0.58	

=== Swan ===
2001 Australian federal election: Swan
Party	Candidate	Votes	%	±%
Labor	Kim Wilkie	29,220	41.27	+1.13
Liberal	Bev Brennan	27,597	38.98	−0.55
Greens	Elena Jeffreys	4,163	5.88	+0.70
Democrats	Paul McCutcheon	4,043	5.71	+0.85
One Nation	Sandra Vinciullo	3,292	4.65	−3.26
Christian Democrats	Colleen Tapley	1,130	1.60	+0.25
Curtin Labor Alliance	Simon Makin	1,096	1.55	+1.55
Citizens Electoral Council	Brian Smith	262	0.37	−0.41
Total formal votes		70,803	95.13	−0.58
Informal votes		3,628	4.87	+0.58
Turnout		74,431	94.78	
Two-party-preferred result
Labor	Kim Wilkie	36,844	52.04	−0.71
Liberal	Bev Brennan	33,959	47.96	+0.71
Labor hold		Swing	−0.71	

=== Tangney ===
2001 Australian federal election: Tangney
Party	Candidate	Votes	%	±%
Liberal	Daryl Williams	37,847	49.81	+1.46
Labor	Sam Gowegati	24,181	31.83	−0.32
Democrats	Andrew Ingram	4,033	5.31	−0.28
Greens	Ben Stanwix	3,820	5.03	+0.23
One Nation	Aaron Lumsdaine	2,576	3.39	−3.61
Independent	Gordon Graham	1,231	1.62	+1.62
Christian Democrats	Craig Watson	1,171	1.54	−0.14
Liberals for Forests	Michael Lucas	1,122	1.48	+1.48
Total formal votes		75,981	95.96	−0.93
Informal votes		3,200	4.04	+0.93
Turnout		79,181	95.75	
Two-party-preferred result
Liberal	Daryl Williams	44,047	57.97	+0.93
Labor	Sam Gowegati	31,934	42.03	−0.93
Liberal hold		Swing	+0.93	

== See also ==
- Results of the 2001 Australian federal election (House of Representatives)
- Members of the Australian House of Representatives, 2001–2004
