= Results of the 1996 Australian federal election in Western Australia =

House of Representatives elections for Western Australia in March 1996

1996 Australian federal election (Western Australia)
| ← 1993 | 2 March 1996 | 1998 → |

All 14 Western Australian seats in the Australian House of Representatives and 6 seats in the Australian Senate
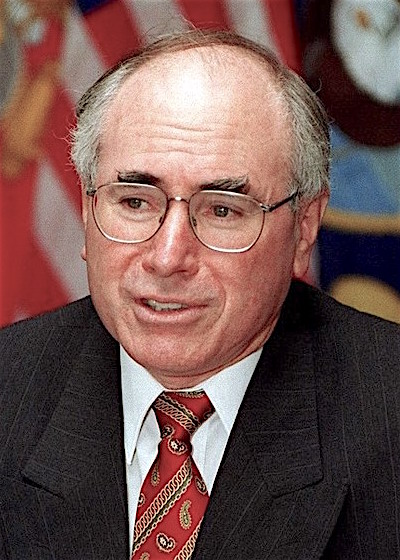

| | First party | Second party |
|---|---|---|
| Leader | John Howard | Paul Keating |
| Party | Liberal/National coalition | Labor |
| Last election | 8 seats | 6 seats |
| Seats won | 8 seats | 3 seats |
| Seat change | Steady | ▼3 |
| Popular vote | 453,980 | 347,583 |
| Percentage | 45.3% | 34.7% |
| Swing | ▼3.9 | ▼4.7 |
| TPP | 56.00% | 44.00% |
| TPP swing | ▲2.02 | ▼2.02 |

This is a list of electoral division results for the Australian 1996 federal election in the state of Western Australia.

== Overall results ==
Turnout 96.6% (CV) — Informal 2.5%
| Party | Votes | % | Swing | Seats | Change |
|---|---|---|---|---|---|
| Liberal | 440,647 | 44.02 | -4.99 | 8 | Steady |
| National | 13,333 | 1.33 | 1.09 | | Steady |
| Liberal/National Coalition | 453,980 | 45.35 | -3.90 | 8 | Steady |
| Labor | 347,583 | 34.73 | -4.62 | 3 | ▼3 |
| Independent | 87,328 | 8.72 | 7.46 | 3 | ▲3 |
| Democrats | 55,862 | 5.58 | 2.30 | | |
| Greens | 53,101 | 5.31 | -0.46 | | |
| Natural Law | 2,159 | 0.22 | -0.31 | | |
| Against Further Immigration | 943 | 0.09 | | | |
| Total | 1,000,956 | | | 14 | |
Two-party-preferred vote
| Liberal/National Coalition | 557,055 | 56.00 | 2.02 | 8 | Steady |
| Labor | 437,694 | 44.00 | -2.02 | 3 | ▼3 |
| Invalid/blank votes | 32,616 | 3.16 | 0.66 | | |
| Turnout | 1,033,572 | 94.95 | | | |
| Registered voters | 1,088,487 | | | | |
Source: Federal Elections 1996

== Results by division ==
=== Brand ===
1996 Australian federal election: Brand
| Party | Candidate | Votes | % | ±% |
|---|---|---|---|---|
| Labor | Kim Beazley | 37,165 | 43.86 | −4.55 |
| Liberal | Penny Hearne | 36,060 | 42.56 | +1.11 |
| Greens | Bob Goodale | 3,577 | 4.22 | −0.71 |
| Democrats | Mal McKercher | 2,969 | 3.50 | +1.02 |
| Independent | Alan Gent | 2,016 | 2.38 | +2.38 |
| Against Further Immigration | Phil Rebe | 943 | 1.11 | +1.11 |
| National | Malcolm Walton | 877 | 1.04 | +1.04 |
| Independent | Leone Anderson | 452 | 0.53 | +0.53 |
| Independent | Brian McCarthy | 373 | 0.44 | +0.44 |
| Independent | Clive Galletly | 301 | 0.36 | +0.36 |
| Total formal votes | | 84,733 | 96.64 | −0.89 |
| Informal votes | | 2,943 | 3.36 | +0.89 |
| Turnout | | 87,676 | 95.20 | −0.75 |
Two-party-preferred result
| Labor | Kim Beazley | 42,379 | 50.23 | −3.47 |
| Liberal | Penny Hearne | 41,992 | 49.77 | +3.47 |
| Labor hold | | Swing | −3.47 | |

=== Canning ===
1996 Australian federal election: Canning
| Party | Candidate | Votes | % | ±% |
|---|---|---|---|---|
| Liberal | Ricky Johnston | 30,949 | 44.15 | +0.13 |
| Labor | George Gear | 28,984 | 41.35 | −3.00 |
| Democrats | Anthony Bloomer | 4,332 | 6.18 | +3.62 |
| Greens | Chris Twomey | 3,686 | 5.26 | +1.21 |
| Independent | Michael Devereux | 1,839 | 2.62 | +2.62 |
| Natural Law | Patti Roberts | 307 | 0.44 | +0.05 |
| Total formal votes | | 70,097 | 96.39 | −1.00 |
| Informal votes | | 2,625 | 3.61 | +1.00 |
| Turnout | | 72,722 | 95.58 | −0.34 |
Two-party-preferred result
| Liberal | Ricky Johnston | 35,356 | 50.69 | +0.88 |
| Labor | George Gear | 34,388 | 49.31 | −0.88 |
| Liberal gain from Labor | | Swing | +0.88 | |

=== Cowan ===
1996 Australian federal election: Cowan
| Party | Candidate | Votes | % | ±% |
|---|---|---|---|---|
| Liberal | Richard Evans | 35,083 | 46.44 | −1.27 |
| Labor | Carolyn Jakobsen | 31,416 | 41.58 | −2.57 |
| Democrats | Sue Coyne | 5,734 | 7.59 | +4.58 |
| Greens | Otto Dik | 3,315 | 4.39 | −0.17 |
| Total formal votes | | 75,548 | 96.35 | −1.16 |
| Informal votes | | 2,864 | 3.65 | +1.16 |
| Turnout | | 78,412 | 95.93 | −0.63 |
Two-party-preferred result
| Liberal | Richard Evans | 39,385 | 52.39 | +1.46 |
| Labor | Carolyn Jakobsen | 35,788 | 47.61 | −1.46 |
| Liberal hold | | Swing | +1.46 | |

=== Curtin ===
1996 Australian federal election: Curtin
| Party | Candidate | Votes | % | ±% |
|---|---|---|---|---|
| Liberal | Ken Court | 27,012 | 39.15 | −20.65 |
| Independent | Allan Rocher | 20,251 | 29.35 | +29.35 |
| Labor | Steven Roebuck | 13,658 | 19.79 | −5.24 |
| Greens | Giz Watson | 4,319 | 6.26 | −3.24 |
| Democrats | Michael Barrett | 2,947 | 4.27 | +0.85 |
| Natural Law | George Kailis | 816 | 1.18 | −0.47 |
| Total formal votes | | 69,003 | 97.97 | −0.04 |
| Informal votes | | 1,427 | 2.03 | +0.04 |
| Turnout | | 70,430 | 95.25 | −0.63 |
Notional two-party-preferred count
| Liberal | Ken Court | 43,804 | 64.05 | −1.17 |
| Labor | Steven Roebuck | 24,584 | 35.95 | +1.17 |
Two-candidate-preferred result
| Independent | Allan Rocher | 39,310 | 57.28 | +57.28 |
| Liberal | Ken Court | 29,316 | 42.72 | −22.48 |
| Member changed to Independent from Liberal | | | | |

=== Forrest ===
1996 Australian federal election: Forrest
| Party | Candidate | Votes | % | ±% |
|---|---|---|---|---|
| Liberal | Geoff Prosser | 43,067 | 56.99 | +0.92 |
| Labor | Ann Mills | 21,920 | 29.01 | −1.71 |
| Greens | Basil Schur | 5,537 | 7.33 | −0.88 |
| Democrats | Ronald Hellyer | 3,864 | 5.11 | +0.11 |
| Independent | Alexander Marsden | 1,181 | 1.56 | +1.56 |
| Total formal votes | | 75,569 | 97.35 | −0.25 |
| Informal votes | | 2,060 | 2.65 | +0.25 |
| Turnout | | 77,629 | 95.88 | −0.94 |
Two-party-preferred result
| Liberal | Geoff Prosser | 47,821 | 63.64 | +1.91 |
| Labor | Ann Mills | 27,320 | 36.36 | −1.91 |
| Liberal hold | | Swing | +1.91 | |

=== Fremantle ===
1996 Australian federal election: Fremantle
| Party | Candidate | Votes | % | ±% |
|---|---|---|---|---|
| Labor | Carmen Lawrence | 33,763 | 46.93 | −3.28 |
| Liberal | Mick Tiller | 29,067 | 40.40 | +1.66 |
| Greens | Alison de Garis | 4,930 | 6.85 | +0.09 |
| Democrats | Joe Guentner | 4,188 | 5.82 | +2.61 |
| Total formal votes | | 71,948 | 96.50 | −0.53 |
| Informal votes | | 2,611 | 3.50 | +0.53 |
| Turnout | | 74,559 | 95.75 | −0.35 |
Two-party-preferred result
| Labor | Carmen Lawrence | 38,747 | 54.25 | −3.54 |
| Liberal | Mick Tiller | 32,674 | 45.75 | +3.54 |
| Labor hold | | Swing | −3.54 | |

=== Kalgoorlie ===
1996 Australian federal election: Kalgoorlie
| Party | Candidate | Votes | % | ±% |
|---|---|---|---|---|
| Independent | Graeme Campbell | 21,895 | 35.13 | +35.13 |
| Labor | Ian Taylor | 21,648 | 34.73 | −19.63 |
| Liberal | Cedric Wyatt | 15,144 | 24.30 | −10.32 |
| Greens | Deborah Botica | 2,324 | 3.73 | −0.45 |
| Democrats | David Thackrah | 1,318 | 2.11 | −0.53 |
| Total formal votes | | 62,329 | 97.23 | −0.19 |
| Informal votes | | 1,777 | 2.77 | +0.19 |
| Turnout | | 64,106 | 88.83 | −0.89 |
Notional two-party-preferred count
| Labor | Ian Taylor | 33,130 | 53.36 | −6.59 |
| Liberal | Cedric Wyatt | 28,960 | 46.64 | +6.59 |
Two-candidate-preferred result
| Independent | Graeme Campbell | 37,536 | 60.35 | +60.35 |
| Labor | Ian Taylor | 24,666 | 39.65 | −20.24 |
| Member changed to Independent from Labor | | | | |

=== Moore ===
1996 Australian federal election: Moore
| Party | Candidate | Votes | % | ±% |
|---|---|---|---|---|
| Independent | Paul Filing | 28,536 | 34.13 | +34.13 |
| Labor | Alistair Jones | 23,766 | 28.43 | −6.54 |
| Liberal | Paul Stevenage | 22,815 | 27.29 | −27.52 |
| Democrats | Sarah Gilfillan | 3,777 | 4.52 | +0.52 |
| Greens | Bill Franssen | 3,537 | 4.23 | −1.43 |
| Independent | Vicki Hancock | 1,171 | 1.40 | +1.40 |
| Total formal votes | | 83,602 | 97.56 | −0.59 |
| Informal votes | | 2,095 | 2.44 | +0.59 |
| Turnout | | 85,697 | 95.83 | −0.88 |
Notional two-party-preferred count
| Liberal | Paul Stevenage | 48,204 | 58.18 | −0.55 |
| Labor | Alistair Jones | 34,648 | 41.82 | +0.55 |
Two-candidate-preferred result
| Independent | Paul Filing | 54,538 | 65.48 | +65.48 |
| Labor | Alistair Jones | 28,757 | 34.52 | −6.74 |
| Member changed to Independent from Liberal | | | | |

=== O'Connor ===
1996 Australian federal election: O'Connor
| Party | Candidate | Votes | % | ±% |
|---|---|---|---|---|
| Liberal | Wilson Tuckey | 38,607 | 56.00 | −12.26 |
| National | Kevin Altham | 12,456 | 18.07 | +18.07 |
| Labor | Mick Cole | 12,240 | 17.76 | −3.88 |
| Greens | John Hemsley | 2,500 | 3.63 | +0.36 |
| Democrats | Neil Munro | 2,338 | 3.39 | +0.02 |
| Independent | Stephan Gyorgy | 795 | 1.15 | +1.15 |
| Total formal votes | | 68,936 | 96.92 | −0.35 |
| Informal votes | | 2,194 | 3.08 | +0.35 |
| Turnout | | 71,130 | 95.11 | −0.76 |
Two-party-preferred result
| Liberal | Wilson Tuckey | 52,099 | 75.93 | +1.91 |
| Labor | Mick Cole | 16,514 | 24.07 | −1.91 |
| Liberal hold | | Swing | +1.91 | |

=== Pearce ===
1996 Australian federal election: Pearce
| Party | Candidate | Votes | % | ±% |
|---|---|---|---|---|
| Liberal | Judi Moylan | 38,070 | 54.18 | +2.82 |
| Labor | Paul Andrews | 20,313 | 28.91 | −3.68 |
| Democrats | Julie Ward | 7,031 | 10.01 | +5.46 |
| Greens | Robert Barnacle | 4,857 | 6.91 | −1.15 |
| Total formal votes | | 70,271 | 96.93 | −0.99 |
| Informal votes | | 2,229 | 3.07 | +0.99 |
| Turnout | | 72,500 | 95.88 | −0.34 |
Two-party-preferred result
| Liberal | Judi Moylan | 43,306 | 62.18 | +3.42 |
| Labor | Paul Andrews | 26,342 | 37.82 | −3.42 |
| Liberal hold | | Swing | +3.42 | |

=== Perth ===
1996 Australian federal election: Perth
| Party | Candidate | Votes | % | ±% |
|---|---|---|---|---|
| Labor | Stephen Smith | 32,018 | 47.56 | +1.19 |
| Liberal | Dee Kelly | 25,262 | 37.53 | −1.29 |
| Greens | Elena Jeffreys | 4,189 | 6.22 | +0.59 |
| Democrats | Jim Kerr | 4,175 | 6.20 | +3.88 |
| Independent | Raymond Conder | 914 | 1.36 | +1.36 |
| | Anthony Benbow | 418 | 0.62 | +0.62 |
| | Gary Nelson | 339 | 0.50 | +0.50 |
| Total formal votes | | 67,315 | 96.17 | −0.28 |
| Informal votes | | 2,678 | 3.83 | +0.28 |
| Turnout | | 69,993 | 93.95 | −1.04 |
Two-party-preferred result
| Labor | Stephen Smith | 37,756 | 56.46 | +0.31 |
| Liberal | Dee Kelly | 29,121 | 43.54 | −0.31 |
| Labor hold | | Swing | +0.31 | |

=== Stirling ===
1996 Australian federal election: Stirling
| Party | Candidate | Votes | % | ±% |
|---|---|---|---|---|
| Liberal | Eoin Cameron | 33,778 | 50.09 | +2.96 |
| Labor | Kareen Carberry | 25,917 | 38.43 | −5.01 |
| Greens | Kim Herbert | 3,790 | 5.62 | +0.74 |
| Democrats | Lawrence Wapnah | 3,525 | 5.23 | +2.09 |
| Natural Law | Cathryn D'Cruz | 429 | 0.64 | +0.16 |
| Total formal votes | | 67,439 | 96.27 | −1.20 |
| Informal votes | | 2,615 | 3.73 | +1.20 |
| Turnout | | 70,054 | 94.99 | −1.04 |
Two-party-preferred result
| Liberal | Eoin Cameron | 37,044 | 55.17 | +3.71 |
| Labor | Kareen Carberry | 30,096 | 44.83 | −3.71 |
| Liberal hold | | Swing | +3.71 | |

=== Swan ===
1996 Australian federal election: Swan
| Party | Candidate | Votes | % | ±% |
|---|---|---|---|---|
| Liberal | Don Randall | 27,974 | 42.34 | −2.87 |
| Labor | Jane Saunders | 24,349 | 36.86 | −7.15 |
| Independent | Bryan Hilbert | 6,274 | 9.50 | +9.50 |
| Democrats | Norm Kelly | 3,574 | 5.41 | +2.85 |
| Greens | Mingli Wanjurri-Nungala | 3,086 | 4.67 | −0.49 |
| Independent | John Tucak | 573 | 0.87 | +0.87 |
| Natural Law | Elspeth Clairs | 235 | 0.36 | −0.03 |
| Total formal votes | | 66,065 | 96.45 | −0.60 |
| Informal votes | | 2,435 | 3.55 | +0.60 |
| Turnout | | 68,500 | 94.53 | −0.98 |
Two-party-preferred result
| Liberal | Don Randall | 35,239 | 53.71 | +3.93 |
| Labor | Jane Saunders | 30,372 | 46.29 | −3.93 |
| Liberal gain from Labor | | Swing | +3.93 | |

=== Tangney ===
1996 Australian federal election: Tangney
| Party | Candidate | Votes | % | ±% |
|---|---|---|---|---|
| Liberal | Daryl Williams | 37,759 | 55.45 | −1.58 |
| Labor | Dermot Buckley | 20,426 | 29.99 | −1.59 |
| Democrats | Ilse Trewin | 6,090 | 8.94 | +5.35 |
| Greens | Margaret Jenkins | 3,454 | 5.07 | −0.76 |
| Natural Law | Ken Barrett | 372 | 0.55 | +0.10 |
| Total formal votes | | 68,101 | 97.06 | −0.92 |
| Informal votes | | 2,063 | 2.94 | +0.92 |
| Turnout | | 70,164 | 96.01 | −0.52 |
Two-party-preferred result
| Liberal | Daryl Williams | 42,050 | 62.13 | +0.27 |
| Labor | Dermot Buckley | 25,630 | 37.87 | −0.27 |
| Liberal hold | | Swing | +0.27 | |

== See also ==
- Results of the 1996 Australian federal election (House of Representatives)
- Members of the Australian House of Representatives, 1996–1998
