= Results of the 2004 Australian federal election in Western Australia =

2004 Australian federal election (Western Australia)
← 2001	9 October 2004	2007 →

All 15 Western Australian seats in the Australian House of Representatives and 6 seats in the Australian Senate

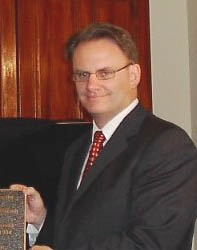
	First party	Second party
Leader	John Howard	Mark Latham
Party	Liberal/National coalition	Labor
Last election	8 seats	7 seats
Seats won	10 seats	5 seats
Seat change	▲2	▼2
Popular vote	534,911	381,200
Percentage	48.76%	34.75%
Swing	▲6.35	▼2.39
TPP	55.40%	44.60%
TPP swing	▲3.78	▼3.78

This is a list of electoral division results for the 2004 Australian federal election in the state of Western Australia.

== Overall results ==
Turnout 92.79% (CV) — Informal 5.32%
Party	Votes	%	Swing	Seats	Change
Liberal	528,016	48.13	+ 6.74	10	▲2
National	6,895	0.63	–0.39		Steady
Liberal–National coalition	534,911	48.76	+6.35	10	▲2
Labor	381,200	34.75	–2.39	5	▼2
Greens	84,100	7.67	+ 1.68		
One Nation	27,650	2.52	–3.75		
Christian Democratics	24,650	2.25	+1.07		
Democrats	16,298	1.49	–3.17		
Citizens Electoral Council	6,539	0.60	+0.33		
Family First	2,619	0.24	+0.24		
New Country	2,625	0.24	+0.25		
Socialist Alliance	1,620	0.15	+0.15		
Independents	14,861	1.35	+ 0.82		
Total	1,158,687			15	
Two-party-preferred vote
Liberal/National Coalition	607,829	55.40	+ 3.78	10	▲2
Labor	489,244	44.60	–3.78	5	▼2
Invalid/blank votes	61,614	5.32	+0.40		
Registered voters/turnout	1,248,732	92.79			
Source: AEC Tally Room

Western Australia saw two seats change hands. The Liberal vote has always been considered strong in this state. It was made stronger in this election due to Kim Beazley's absence as Labor leader. Beazley, a native Western Australian was seen to bolster Labor's poll numbers when he stood in 1998 and 2001. This and the unpopular Labor state Geoff Gallop government of the time saw Labor's polling numbers slide to its lowest since 1977.

== Results by division ==
=== Brand ===
2004 Australian federal election: Brand
Party	Candidate	Votes	%	±%
Labor	Kim Beazley	34,892	47.09	−4.62
Liberal	Phil Edman	29,563	39.89	+15.92
Greens	Jean Jenkins	3,578	4.83	+1.35
One Nation	Garth Stockden	2,045	2.76	−3.38
Christian Democrats	Rajesh Vettoor	1,581	2.13	+1.26
Independent	Gerard Kettle	1,084	1.46	+1.46
Citizens Electoral Council	Rob Totten	742	1.00	+0.77
Democrats	John Partridge	619	0.84	−1.55
Total formal votes		74,104	94.20	−1.49
Informal votes		4,566	5.80	+1.49
Turnout		78,670	93.41	−1.79
Two-party-preferred result
Labor	Kim Beazley	40,499	54.65	−5.40
Liberal	Phil Edman	33,605	45.35	+5.40
Labor hold		Swing	−5.40	

=== Canning ===
2004 Australian federal election: Canning
Party	Candidate	Votes	%	±%
Liberal	Don Randall	39,354	52.74	+10.90
Labor	Kay Hallahan	24,533	32.88	−5.41
Greens	Margo Beilby	3,766	5.05	−0.31
One Nation	Angelo Dacheff	2,035	2.73	−4.46
Christian Democrats	Vivian Hill	1,802	2.41	−0.16
Independent	Margaret Dodd	871	1.17	+1.17
Democrats	Tony Bennell	864	1.16	−2.65
Family First	Bev Custers	756	1.01	+1.01
Citizens Electoral Council	Brian McCarthy	642	0.86	−0.08
Total formal votes		74,623	94.29	−0.57
Informal votes		4,515	5.71	+0.57
Turnout		79,138	93.78	−1.40
Two-party-preferred result
Liberal	Don Randall	44,434	59.54	+9.16
Labor	Kay Hallahan	30,189	40.46	−9.16
Liberal hold		Swing	+9.16	

=== Cowan ===
2004 Australian federal election: Cowan
Party	Candidate	Votes	%	±%
Liberal	Luke Simpkins	33,905	44.39	+8.27
Labor	Graham Edwards	33,510	43.87	−3.88
Greens	Glen George	4,272	5.59	+1.53
Christian Democrats	Richard Leeder	1,873	2.45	+0.91
One Nation	Clem Winton	1,538	2.01	−3.67
Democrats	Sarah Gilfillan	1,002	1.31	−2.97
Citizens Electoral Council	Basil Atkins	282	0.37	+0.37
Total formal votes		76,382	94.99	−0.34
Informal votes		4,032	5.01	+0.34
Turnout		80,414	94.17	−1.55
Two-party-preferred result
Labor	Graham Edwards	38,784	50.78	−4.73
Liberal	Luke Simpkins	37,598	49.22	+4.73
Labor hold		Swing	−4.73	

=== Curtin ===
2004 Australian federal election: Curtin
Party	Candidate	Votes	%	±%
Liberal	Julie Bishop	45,081	59.59	+4.43
Labor	Bill Kruse	17,968	23.75	+0.31
Greens	Sonja Lundie-Jenkins	8,689	11.48	+2.23
Democrats	Rob Olver	1,688	2.23	−4.18
Christian Democrats	Gail Forder	1,272	1.68	+0.67
One Nation	Albert Caine	744	0.98	−1.44
Citizens Electoral Council	Colin Horne	216	0.29	+0.29
Total formal votes		75,658	96.48	−0.22
Informal votes		2,760	3.52	+0.22
Turnout		78,418	93.12	−1.93
Two-party-preferred result
Liberal	Julie Bishop	48,887	64.62	+0.71
Labor	Bill Kruse	26,771	35.38	−0.71
Liberal hold		Swing	+0.71	

=== Forrest ===
2004 Australian federal election: Forrest
Party	Candidate	Votes	%	±%
Liberal	Geoff Prosser	41,422	53.42	+7.39
Labor	Tresslyn Smith	21,655	27.93	−2.68
Greens	Kingsley Gibson	6,549	8.45	+1.28
One Nation	Alan Giorgi	2,667	3.44	−6.61
Democrats	Adam Welch	1,311	1.69	−1.63
Family First	Linda Rose	1,281	1.65	+1.65
Christian Democrats	Shane Flanegan	1,242	1.60	+1.60
New Country	Ken Vagg	1,075	1.39	+1.39
Citizens Electoral Council	Ian Tuffnell	334	0.43	+0.05
Total formal votes		77,536	94.50	−0.45
Informal votes		4,512	5.50	+0.45
Turnout		82,048	94.15	−1.53
Two-party-preferred result
Liberal	Geoff Prosser	46,871	60.45	+2.84
Labor	Tresslyn Smith	30,665	39.55	−2.84
Liberal hold		Swing	+2.84	

=== Fremantle ===
2004 Australian federal election: Fremantle
Party	Candidate	Votes	%	±%
Labor	Carmen Lawrence	32,394	44.58	−2.43
Liberal	Carmelo Zagami	26,118	35.94	+5.54
Greens	Nicola Paris	8,562	11.78	+2.72
One Nation	Craig Mackintosh	1,687	2.32	−3.63
Christian Democrats	Michelle Shave	1,524	2.10	+0.69
Democrats	Delys Beaumont	1,231	1.69	−3.66
Citizens Electoral Council	Damian Poole	800	1.10	+1.10
Socialist Alliance	Ian Jamieson	350	0.48	+0.48
Total formal votes		72,666	93.15	−1.14
Informal votes		5,344	6.85	+1.14
Turnout		78,010	93.20	−1.74
Two-party-preferred result
Labor	Carmen Lawrence	41,970	57.76	−2.91
Liberal	Carmelo Zagami	30,696	42.24	+2.91
Labor hold		Swing	−2.91	

=== Hasluck ===
2004 Australian federal election: Hasluck
Party	Candidate	Votes	%	±%
Liberal	Stuart Henry	32,457	45.37	+6.04
Labor	Sharryn Jackson	27,395	38.29	+0.06
Greens	Jane Bremmer	4,911	6.86	+1.19
One Nation	Paul Nield	2,413	3.37	−3.63
Christian Democrats	Terry Ryan	2,221	3.10	+0.69
Democrats	Nicola Hannah	1,236	1.73	−3.18
Citizens Electoral Council	Simon Hall	913	1.28	+0.14
Total formal votes		71,546	95.02	+0.82
Informal votes		3,752	4.98	−0.82
Turnout		75,298	93.49	−1.72
Two-party-preferred result
Liberal	Stuart Henry	37,078	51.82	+3.60
Labor	Sharryn Jackson	34,468	48.18	−3.60
Liberal gain from Labor		Swing	+3.60	

=== Kalgoorlie ===
2004 Australian federal election: Kalgoorlie
Party	Candidate	Votes	%	±%
Liberal	Barry Haase	29,475	45.46	+2.86
Labor	Tom Stephens	20,691	31.92	−3.14
Independent	Graeme Campbell	6,654	10.26	+10.26
Greens	Kado Muir	4,101	6.33	+2.55
One Nation	Robin Scott	1,511	2.33	−6.27
Christian Democrats	Craig Hendry	827	1.28	+1.28
Independent	Brendon Cook	506	0.78	+0.78
Democrats	Don Hoddy	496	0.77	−2.75
Citizens Electoral Council	Lorraine Thomas	318	0.49	+0.33
Independent	Nabil Haji Rowland	252	0.39	+0.39
Total formal votes		64,831	94.66	+0.26
Informal votes		3,656	5.34	−0.26
Turnout		68,487	83.53	−3.28
Two-party-preferred result
Liberal	Barry Haase	36,502	56.30	+1.96
Labor	Tom Stephens	28,329	43.70	−1.96
Liberal hold		Swing	+1.96	

=== Moore ===
2004 Australian federal election: Moore
Party	Candidate	Votes	%	±%
Liberal	Mal Washer	37,739	55.34	+6.35
Labor	Kim Young	21,446	31.45	−2.22
Greens	Thor Kerr	4,829	7.08	+1.66
Christian Democrats	Evelynne Wong	1,445	2.12	+2.12
One Nation	George Gault	1,388	2.04	−2.49
Democrats	Kevin Payne	1,160	1.70	−3.29
Citizens Electoral Council	Arthur Harvey	189	0.28	+0.28
Total formal votes		68,196	95.66	−0.38
Informal votes		3,092	4.34	+0.38
Turnout		71,288	93.90	−1.62
Two-party-preferred result
Liberal	Mal Washer	41,486	60.83	+4.79
Labor	Kim Young	26,710	39.17	−4.79
Liberal hold		Swing	+4.79	

=== O'Connor ===
2004 Australian federal election: O'Connor
Party	Candidate	Votes	%	±%
Liberal	Wilson Tuckey	38,878	53.25	+3.77
Labor	Ursula Richards	13,559	18.57	−1.21
National	Leigh Hardingham	6,895	9.44	+2.09
Greens	Adrian Price	4,910	6.73	+2.00
One Nation	Brian McRae	3,177	4.35	−7.42
Christian Democrats	Justin Moseley	2,060	2.82	+0.66
Independent	George Giudice	2,013	2.76	+2.76
New Country	Jan Hough	639	0.88	+0.88
Democrats	David Thackrah	511	0.70	−1.32
Citizens Electoral Council	Callum Payne	367	0.50	+0.05
Total formal votes		73,009	94.51	+0.43
Informal votes		4,245	5.49	−0.43
Turnout		77,254	93.26	−2.04
Two-party-preferred result
Liberal	Wilson Tuckey	51,389	70.39	+1.30
Labor	Ursula Richards	21,620	29.61	−1.30
Liberal hold		Swing	+1.30	

=== Pearce ===
2004 Australian federal election: Pearce
Party	Candidate	Votes	%	±%
Liberal	Judi Moylan	40,300	53.72	+8.89
Labor	David Ritter	21,046	28.05	−2.27
Greens	Dominique Lieb	5,891	7.85	+0.63
One Nation	David Gunnyon	2,803	3.74	−4.95
Christian Democrats	Robert Merrells	2,235	2.98	+1.76
Democrats	Donella McLean	1,155	1.54	−2.94
New Country	Jeanette Radisich	911	1.21	+1.21
Citizens Electoral Council	Ron McLean	396	0.53	+0.10
Socialist Alliance	Annolies Truman	286	0.38	+0.38
Total formal votes		75,023	94.70	−0.32
Informal votes		4,201	5.30	+0.32
Turnout		79,224	93.67	−1.30
Two-party-preferred result
Liberal	Judi Moylan	47,219	62.94	+6.06
Labor	David Ritter	27,804	37.06	−6.06
Liberal hold		Swing	+6.06	

=== Perth ===
2004 Australian federal election: Perth
Party	Candidate	Votes	%	±%
Labor	Stephen Smith	33,532	45.59	−2.29
Liberal	Alexander Lawrance	27,127	36.88	+4.55
Greens	Alison Xamon	7,045	9.58	+2.22
Christian Democrats	Augustine Loh	1,807	2.46	+2.46
One Nation	Marie Edmonds	1,463	1.99	−2.40
Democrats	Ray Bradbury	1,344	1.83	−5.45
Socialist Alliance	Nikki Ulasowski	984	1.34	+1.34
Citizens Electoral Council	Ross Russell	247	0.34	+0.34
Total formal votes		73,549	94.02	−0.96
Informal votes		4,680	5.98	+0.96
Turnout		78,229	92.93	−1.92
Two-party-preferred result
Labor	Stephen Smith	41,723	56.73	−4.48
Liberal	Alexander Lawrance	31,826	43.27	+4.48
Labor hold		Swing	−4.48	

=== Stirling ===
2004 Australian federal election: Stirling
Party	Candidate	Votes	%	±%
Liberal	Michael Keenan	35,938	47.26	+7.07
Labor	Jann McFarlane	29,616	38.94	−2.30
Greens	Katrina Bercov	5,438	7.15	+1.17
Christian Democrats	Ray Moran	1,472	1.94	+0.61
One Nation	Alex Patrick	1,119	1.47	−2.48
Democrats	Giuseppe Coletti	1,108	1.46	−4.47
Citizens Electoral Council	Leone Pearson	691	0.91	+0.91
Independent	Marcus Anderson	664	0.87	+0.87
Total formal votes		76,046	94.08	−0.52
Informal votes		4,785	5.92	+0.52
Turnout		80,831	92.95	−1.78
Two-party-preferred result
Liberal	Michael Keenan	39,578	52.04	+3.62
Labor	Jann McFarlane	36,468	47.96	−3.62
Liberal gain from Labor		Swing	+3.62	

=== Swan ===
2004 Australian federal election: Swan
Party	Candidate	Votes	%	±%
Liberal	Andrew Murfin	30,598	44.14	+5.16
Labor	Kim Wilkie	27,675	39.92	−1.35
Greens	Dave Fort	5,745	8.29	+2.41
One Nation	Ted Vermeer	1,232	1.78	−2.87
Christian Democrats	Gwen Hamence	1,214	1.75	+0.15
Democrats	Mark Reynolds	1,133	1.63	−4.08
Independent	Teresa van Lieshout	947	1.37	+1.37
Family First	Peter Greaves	582	0.84	+0.84
Citizens Electoral Council	Azmi Johari	198	0.29	−0.08
Total formal votes		69,324	94.54	−0.59
Informal votes		4,006	5.46	+0.59
Turnout		73,330	92.18	−2.05
Two-party-preferred result
Labor	Kim Wilkie	34,714	50.08	−1.96
Liberal	Andrew Murfin	34,610	49.92	+1.96
Labor hold		Swing	−1.96	

=== Tangney ===
2004 Australian federal election: Tangney
Party	Candidate	Votes	%	±%
Liberal	Dennis Jensen	40,061	53.72	+3.91
Labor	Gavin Waugh	21,288	28.54	−3.29
Greens	Andrew Duckett	5,814	7.80	+2.77
Christian Democrats	Colleen Tapley	2,075	2.78	+1.24
Independent	Wilson Wu	1,870	2.51	+2.51
One Nation	Lloyd Boon	1,828	2.45	−0.94
Democrats	Andrew Ingram	1,440	1.93	−3.38
Citizens Electoral Council	Neil Vincent	204	0.27	+0.27
Total formal votes		74,580	95.56	−0.40
Informal votes		3,468	4.44	+0.40
Turnout		78,048	93.91	−1.52
Two-party-preferred result
Liberal	Dennis Jensen	46,050	61.75	+3.78
Labor	Gavin Waugh	28,530	38.25	−3.78
Liberal hold		Swing	+3.78	
