= John Hallett (Australian politician) =

Australian politician

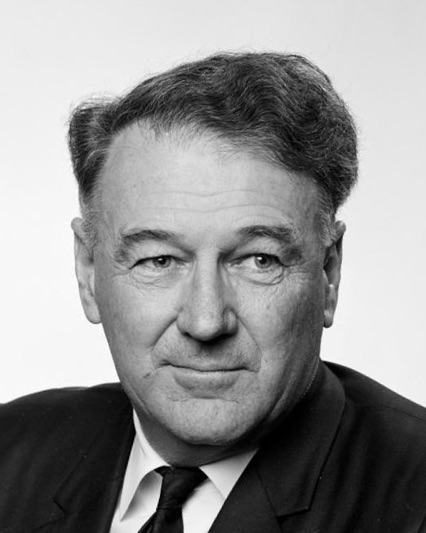
- Hallett in 1971

Member of the Australian Parliament for Canning
- In office 30 November 1963 – 18 May 1974
- Preceded by: Neil McNeill
- Succeeded by: Mel Bungey

Personal details
- Born: 9 October 1917 Narrogin, Western Australia, Australia
- Died: 9 August 1999 (aged 81)
- Party: Country Party
- Other political affiliations: National Alliance (1974)
- Occupation: Farmer

John Mead Hallett (9 October 1917 – 9 August 1999) was an Australian politician. He was a member of the Country Party and served in the House of Representatives from 1963 to 1974, representing the Western Australian seat of Canning. He also served as state president of the Country Party from 1962 to 1963.

== Early life ==
Hallett was born on 9 October 1917 in Narrogin, Western Australia. He attended Guildford Grammar School in Perth.

Hallett had a farming and grazing property at Corrigin. He was active in the Farmers' Union of Western Australia and served a term as general treasurer. He also represented agricultural interests on the Fremantle Harbour Trust, where he was involved in the creation of the Fremantle Passenger Terminal and the Fremantle Port Authority building.

== Politics ==
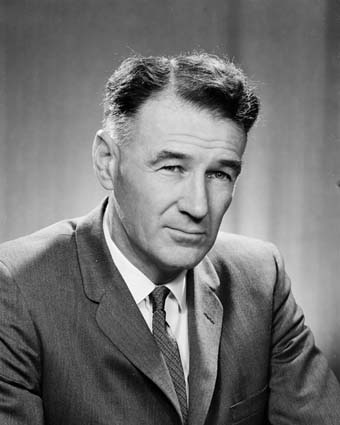
Hallett in 1964

Hallett first stood for the House of Representatives at the 1961 federal election, losing to the Liberal candidate Neil McNeill in the seat of Canning. He was elected state president of the Country Party in 1962.

At the 1963 election, Hallett recontested Canning for the Country Party and defeated McNeill with the assistance of Australian Labor Party (ALP) preferences. He was re-elected in 1966 despite the ALP redirecting its preferences to the Liberal Party.

In parliament, Hallett was a deputy chairman of committees from 1967 to 1972 and served on the Joint Standing Committee on the Australian Capital Territory from 1970 to 1974, including as deputy chair from 1973 to 1974. He was an advocate of the White Australia policy and publicly opposed Asian immigration to Australia.

Hallett lost his seat to the Liberal candidate Mel Bungey at the 1974 election, running under the National Alliance banner with the joint endorsement of the Country Party and the Democratic Labor Party. After his defeat, he made a "blistering attack" on the National Alliance, stating it was "probably the biggest mistake in the history of the Country Party" and that he had been "opposed to the idea from the start".

== Personal life ==
Hallett had two daughters. He died on 9 August 1999, aged 81.

Parliament of Australia
Preceded by Neil McNeill	Member for Canning; 1963 – 1974	Succeeded by Mel Bungey
