= Neil McNeill =

Australian politician (1921–2009)

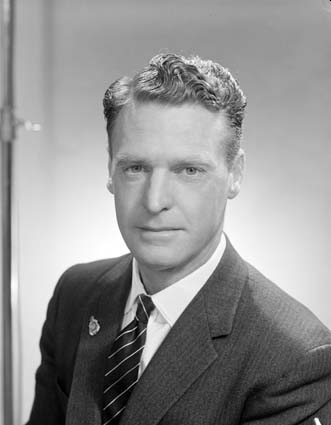

Member of the Australian Parliament for Canning
- In office 9 December 1961 – 30 November 1963
- Preceded by: Len Hamilton
- Succeeded by: John Hallett

Personal details
- Born: 19 June 1921 Yarloop, Western Australia
- Died: 8 February 2009 (aged 87) Cottesloe, Western Australia
- Party: Liberal Party
- Education: University of Western Australia
- Occupation: Public servant, farmer

Neil McNeill (19 June 1921 – 8 February 2009) was an Australian politician. He was a member of the Liberal Party and served in the House of Representatives from 1961 to 1963, representing the seat of Canning. He later served in the Western Australian Legislative Council from 1965 to 1983 and was a state government minister from 1974 to 1977. He was a farmer and agricultural officer before entering politics and also served in the Royal Australian Naval Volunteer Reserve during World War II.

== Early life ==
McNeill was born on 19 June 1921 in Yarloop, Western Australia. He attended state schools in Pithara and Waroona before completing his secondary education at Scotch College, Perth. After leaving school he enrolled at the University of Western Australia to study agriculture, but deferred his studies to enlist in the military and later graduating Bachelor of Science in 1947.

McNeill enlisted in the Royal Australian Naval Volunteer Reserve in 1942, with the rank of able seaman. He served aboard minesweepers in the Pacific, including HMAS Coolebar. He was later engaged as a naval liaison officer and beachmaster at the Army Amphibious Training Centre in Darwin, prior to his discharge in 1945.

McNeill was employed as an adviser with the state Department of Agriculture from 1947 to 1948, then returned to his family farm at Hamel which he acquired outright in 1951. He served as president of the Waroona branch of the Farmers' Union of Western Australia from 1952 to 1959 and was active in the Junior Farmers' Movement.

== Politics ==
McNeill joined the Liberal Party in 1949. He served on the Drakesbrook Road Board from 1956 to 1962, including as chairman from 1960 to 1961.

McNeill was elected to the House of Representatives at the 1961 federal election, winning the seat of Canning for the Liberal Party following the retirement of the incumbent Country Party member Len Hamilton. He was defeated after only a single term at the 1963 election, with the unsuccessful Country Party candidate from 1961 John Hallett winning a narrow victory with Australian Labor Party preferences.

At the 1965 state election, McNeill was elected to the Western Australian Legislative Council as the Liberal candidate for Lower West Province. He served as leader of the government in the Legislative Council from 1974 to 1977, under Premier Charles Court, and was Minister for Justice (1974–1977) and Chief Secretary (1975–1977). He was an advocate for community service as an alternative to imprisonment for minor offences. He retired from parliament at the 1983 state election.

== Personal life ==
McNeill retired to Cottesloe. He died in Claremont on 8 February 2009 and was interred at Drakesbrook Cemetery in Waroona.

Parliament of Australia
Preceded by Len Hamilton	Member for Canning; 1961–1963	Succeeded by John Hallett
