= Mel Bungey =

Australian politician (1934–2025)

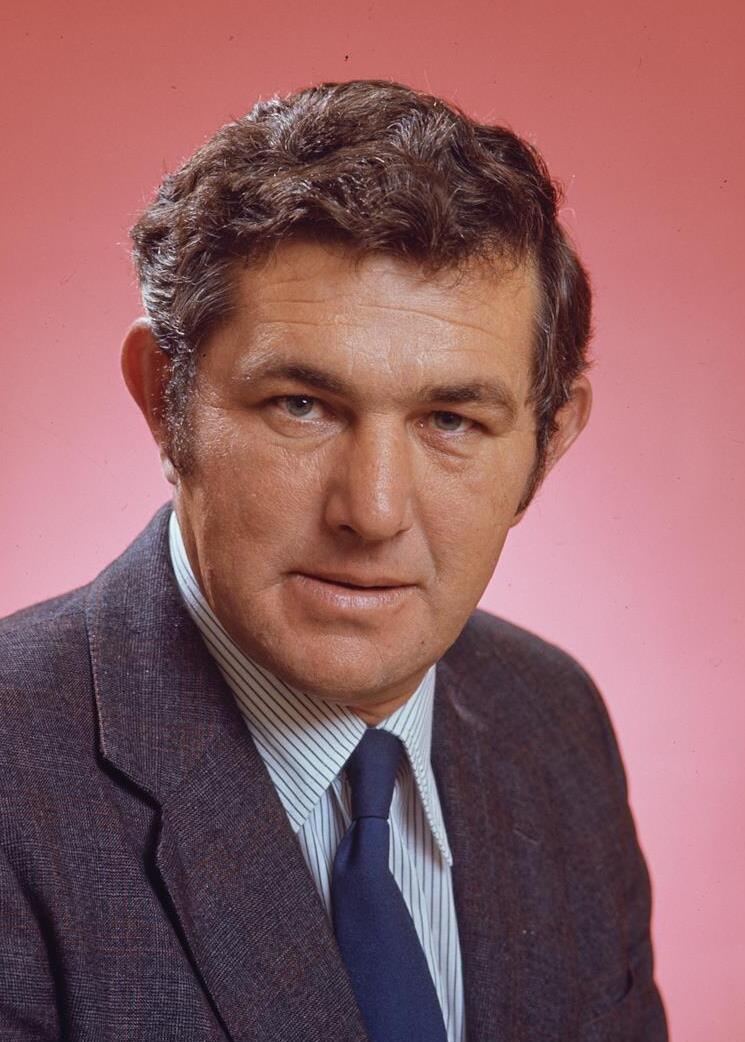
- Bungey in 1974

Member of the Australian Parliament for Canning
- In office 18 May 1974 – 5 March 1983
- Preceded by: John Hallett
- Succeeded by: Wendy Fatin

Personal details
- Born: 30 August 1934 Gnowangerup, Western Australia, Australia
- Died: 17 September 2025 (aged 91)
- Party: Liberal
- Education: University of Western Australia
- Occupation: Farmer

Melville Harold Bungey (30 August 1934 – 17 September 2025) was an Australian politician. He was a member of the House of Representatives from 1974 to 1983, representing the seat of Canning for the Liberal Party.

== Early life ==
Bungey was born in Gnowangerup, Western Australia on 30 August 1934. He was educated at Wesley College, Perth, and went on to complete a Bachelor of Arts at the University of Western Australia, majoring in economics and a Master of Public Policy at Murdoch University.

Bungey served in the Citizen Military Forces from 1951 to 1958. After graduating from university he worked for the Prime Minister's Department in Perth and Canberra. He later returned to Western Australia to work on the family property at Borden.

Prior to his election to parliament, Bungey was active in the Farmers' Union of Western Australia and served as vice-president of its wool section. He was also a member of the Australian Wool Industry Conference and a delegate to the Australian Wool and Meat Producers' Federation. According to The Beverley Times he was "a vigorous advocate of wool marketing reform and played a prominent part in updating the Farmers' Union wool marketing policy".

== Politics ==
Bungey was elected to the House of Representatives at the 1974 federal election, winning the seat of Canning for the Liberal Party from the incumbent Country Party MP John Hallett.

In parliament, Bungey served on a number of committees, notably as chair of the Joint Statutory Committee on Public Works from 1978 to 1983. During the Fraser government he was known for his submission of large numbers of questions on notice, covering a wide range of topics but with a focus on Australian Public Service operations. In April 1981 he lodged 691 questions in a single submission. Bungey crossed the floor fifteen times during his period in parliament. According to a study of parliamentary floor crossings from 1950 to 2019, Bill Wentworth was the only other member of the House of Representatives to cross the floor on more occasions.

Bungey's seat became increasingly marginal during his time in parliament, following a series of redistributions that saw Canning lose rural areas and became increasingly urban, taking in Perth's southern suburbs of Armadale and Rockingham. He was defeated by the Australian Labor Party (ALP) candidate Wendy Fatin at the 1983 federal election. During the election campaign he publicly criticised Prime Minister Malcolm Fraser for what he viewed as Fraser's negative campaigning style.

== Personal life and death ==
Bungey and his wife Leith bred prize-winning chihuahuas. He served as president of the Canine Association of Western Australia and was a licensed dog show judge with the Australian National Kennel Council, judging shows in Australia and overseas.

Bungey retired to Roleystone. He died on 17 September 2025, at the age of 91.

Parliament of Australia
Preceded by John Hallett	Member for Canning; 1974–1983	Succeeded by Wendy Fatin
