= Frederick Austin Johnston =

Australian businessman and political activist

Fred Johnston CBE CMG
- Born: 9 October 1909; Blaydon, Durham, England
- Died: 19 May 1990 (aged 80); Subiaco, Western Australia, Australia
- Occupations: Butcher, businessman
- Spouse: Nance Dethridge (m. 1935)
- Relatives: Ricky Johnston (daughter-in-law)

Frederick Austin Johnston CBE CMG (9 October 1909 – 19 May 1990) was an Australian businessman and political activist. He ran one of Western Australia's largest meat-processing firms and served on the Perth City Council from 1963 to 1965, also serving terms as president of the Liberal and Country League and the Australian Council of Employers' Federations.

== Early life ==
Johnston was born on 9 October 1909 in Blaydon, Durham, England. He was the son of Elizabeth Florence (née Johnston) and William Oliver Johnston, his father being a butcher. He attended secondary school in Wallsend. The family immigrated to Australia in 1926, settling in Perth where his father opened a butcher's shop on Barrack Street. The shop relocated to Beaufort Street in 1929.

== Business career ==
Johnston became managing director of W. O. Johnston & Sons in 1942. The company became "one of Western Australia’s biggest meat-processing firms", exporting sausages and smallgoods overseas to Singapore and the Dutch East Indies. It also supplied the Department of Defence Co-ordination during World War II. In 1947, the company was fined for producing sausages with too much starch. Johnston claimed in 1949 that the company would soon close down due to inconsistent electricity supply and a shortage of meat. In October 1964 he announced that his firm had become insolvent, stating in a notice to creditors that "the stock and receivables of the company had been gravely overvalued". It was taken over in 1967 by Talloman Holdings.

Johnston was a member of the Meat and Allied Trades Federation of Australia, a peak body for employers, and helped establish the Western Australian Meat Exporters' Association in the 1960s. He served as president of the Western Australian Employers' Federation (1948–1953) and the Australian Council of Employers' Federations (1953–1955). In 1952 he stated that communists were to blame for a strike in the Midland Railway Workshops. In 1954 he publicly criticised federal opposition leader H. V. Evatt's statements on the Commonwealth Court of Conciliation and Arbitration. He was also a member of the council of the Chamber of Manufactures (1949–1957).

== Politics and public life ==
Johnston was a foundation member of the Liberal Party of Australia in 1945. In the lead-up to the 1947 Western Australian state election he "took a leading role in mobilising business support in the campaign". Johnston was elected state president of Liberal and Country League in 1954, but resigned in February 1955 to take an overseas trip. He served a further term from 1957 to 1961, and again "rallied business support" in the lead-up to the 1959 state election. He served on the Perth City Council from 1963 to 1965.

Outside of politics, Johnston served terms as president of the Western Australian Golf Club and the Badminton Association of Western Australia. He was chairman of the finance committee for the 1962 British Empire and Commonwealth Games in Perth. He also served as chairman of Sir Charles Gairdner Hospital (1974–1982) and president of the Cancer Council of Western Australia (1978–1984).

== Personal life ==
Johnston married Nance Jessie Dethridge on 23 March 1935, with whom he had two children. His daughter-in-law Ricky Johnston was also involved in the Liberal Party and became a federal MP. He died in Subiaco, Western Australia, on 19 May 1990, aged 80.

Johnston was appointed Commander of the Order of the British Empire (CBE) in 1956. He was also made Companion of the Order of St Michael and St George (CMG) in 1963 for service to the Commonwealth Games.
