= Sadie Canning =

Australian nurse (1930–2008)

Sadie Miriam Canning MBE (1930 - 2008) was a healthcare professional and human rights activist, a Wangkatha woman who became Western Australia's first Aboriginal trained nurse and hospital matron.

== Early years ==
Sadie Miriam Corner was born on April 11, 1930 in Laverton, Western Australia. The daughter of Milba Morton, at the age of four she became a member of the Stolen Generation and was placed in the Mount Margaret Mission.

== Career ==
In 1949, Aboriginal women in Western Australia were barred from nurse training so Sadie travelled to Melbourne and began her nursing training at Bethesda Hospital. She completed her midwifery training at the Haven Hospital in Fitzroy and infant welfare training at the Presbyterian Babies Home in Camberwell.

She returned to the Leonora District Hospital in 1956. She was promoted to the position of Matron in 1958 until her retirement in 1990. She worked to end segregation in the hospital and improve medical services to Aboriginal people.

== Awards ==
- 1964 - Member of the British Empire (MBE) for services to nursing, improving facilities and indigenous healthcare in Western Australia
- 1977 - QEII Silver Jubilee Medal for her service to country nursing in Western Australia
- 2001 - Centenary Medal for long and devoted nursing care to the people of a remote community

A Royal Flying Doctor Service plane, a Piper PA-31-310 Navajo C built in 1981 was named Sadie Canning. A road leading to the Leonora District Hospital was named Sadie Canning Drive in 1982.

Canning died on September 3, 2008 at Mount Lawley, Western Australia, she was 78 years old.
