= Ricky Johnston =

Australian politician (born 1943)

Member of the Australian Parliament for Canning
- In office 2 March 1996 – 3 October 1998
- Preceded by: George Gear
- Succeeded by: Jane Gerick

Personal details
- Born: Henrike Heppekausen; 29 September 1943 (age 82) Meissen, Germany
- Party: Liberal
- Relations: Fred Johnston (father-in-law)
- Occupation: Nurse, corporate manager

Henrike "Ricky" Johnston (née Heppekausen; born 29 September 1943) is a former Australian politician. A member of the Liberal Party, she represented the Western Australian seat of Canning in the House of Representatives from 1996 to 1998.

== Early life ==
Johnston was born on 29 September 1943 in Meissen, Germany (East Germany after 1949). She is the daughter of Maya and Henry Heppekausen. She and her family immigrated to Australia in 1954.

Johnston completed a diploma of nursing at Fremantle Hospital and was the director of a nursing employment agency from 1975 to 1981. She later worked as marketing manager for a food processing company (1987–1989), divisional manager with the Australian Bureau of Statistics for the 1991 census, and human resources manager at an aged care company (1994–1996).

== Politics ==
Johnston was introduced to the Liberal Party by her father-in-law Fred Johnston, a former state president. She served several terms on the party's state council and was also a member of its policy committee. She served on the Canning City Council from 1983 to 1986.

Johnston was an unsuccessful candidate in the Division of Canning at the 1984, 1987, 1990 and 1993 federal elections. She also contested Liberal preselection for the Division of Pearce prior to the 1990 election, losing to incumbent senator Fred Chaney. Johnston was finally elected to the House of Representatives at the 1996 election, as part of a landslide victory for the Coalition. She was defeated in 1998 after a single term.

== Later life ==
Johnston was appointed to the Migration Review Tribunal in 1999 and the Refugee Review Tribunal in 2004, with her term expiring in 2010. She was a part-time member based in Brisbane.

== Personal life ==
Johnston had two sons with her husband Ian.

Parliament of Australia
Preceded by George Gear	Member for Canning; 1996–1998	Succeeded by Jane Gerick
