= Jane Gerick =

Australian politician (1963–2003)

Member of the Australian Parliament for Canning
- In office 3 October 1998 – 10 November 2001
- Preceded by: Ricky Johnston
- Succeeded by: Don Randall

Personal details
- Born: 23 April 1963 Meekatharra, Western Australia
- Died: 25 December 2003 (aged 40)
- Party: Australian Labor Party

Jane Frances Gerick (23 April 1963 – 25 December 2003) was an Australian politician. She served for one term as a Labor member of the Australian House of Representatives from 1998 to 2001, representing the division of Canning, Western Australia.

== Early life ==
Gerick was born on 23 April 1963 in Meekatharra, Western Australia. Her father, whom she described in her maiden speech as "one of the major influences on my life", died when she was a teenager. She grew up in the remote mining town of Wiluna.

Gerick completed the degree of Bachelor of Education at Curtin University and a diploma in teaching at the Western Australian College of Advanced Education. She worked as a schoolteacher from 1984 to 1990, then was the owner of the City Business College, an adult training provider in Perth.

== Politics ==
Gerick served as secretary of the ALP's Armadale sub-branch from 1991 to 1998 and was a delegate to ALP state and national conferences.

Gerick was elected to federal parliament as one of several new Labor MPs at the 1998 federal election; her party rebounded strongly from its landslide defeat at the 1996 federal election but narrowly failed to win back government. Gerick defeated one term Liberal MP Ricky Johnston. She won with 53.5% of the two party preferred vote. However, a redistribution during the next term scaled back her majority to an extremely marginal 0.4%. A slight drop in the Labor vote to 49.9% at the 2001 federal election saw Gerick defeated by Liberal candidate Don Randall.

== Personal life ==
In February 2001, Gerick was diagnosed with acute lymphoblastic leukaemia. In 2003, she was endorsed for a re-match against Randall for an election due the following year. However, Gerick died of a brain haemorrhage on Christmas Day 2003.

Parliament of Australia
Preceded by Ricky Johnston	Member for Canning; 1998–2001	Succeeded by Don Randall
