= WAFarmers =

Agricultural organisation in Western Australia

- Formation: 1912
- Headquarters: Bentley, Western Australia
- Website: www.wafarmers.org.au

WAFarmers, formerly the Western Australian Farmers Federation, is an agricultural organisation in Western Australia.

== History ==
As early as 1890 some farming organisations had been formed in Western Australia, with the Wheatgrowers' Association being formed in 1908. In March 1912 the Farmers and Settlers' Association was formed in part as a response to a letter to WA farmers from the Rural Workers' Union of Australia discussing farm workers' wages and merged with the Wheatgrowers' Association.

The Farmers and Settlers' Association, together with the Producers' Union, formed the business Westralian Farmers (known later as Wesfarmers) in 1913. They also established a new political party, the Country Party, to obtain representation in both state and federal parliaments.

In 1920, the Farmers and Settlers' Association changed its name to the Primary Producers' Association (PPA).

Large numbers of small-scale farmers, many of them veterans of World War I with backgrounds as mineworkers or in other industries, entered the industry during the 1920s. They formed a new, separate Wheat Growers' Union in 1930, and later became known as the Wheat and Wool Growers' Union (WAWGU). The Union, along with counterparts in other Australian states, was politically closer to the political left than the PPA, and many of its members initially supported the Australian Labor Party (and even included supporters of the Communist Party of Australia). Nevertheless, the two organisations cooperated on a joint committee in 1932, to investigate bulk wheat handling. This led to the establishment in 1932 of CBH Group, financed by Westralian Farmers.

The Primary Producers' Association created separate sections in 1932 for its commodities (initially wheat, wool and dairy, later adding barley and oats, meat, bees, and poultry) and the political aspects, and in 1944 the political section and the Country Party separated from the PPA completely, forming the Country and Democratic League.

In spite of their political differences the PPA and WAWGU merged in 1946, to form the Farmers' Union of Western Australia. The name was changed in 1982 to the Primary Industry Association, and again in 1987, to the Western Australian Farmers Federation, to more closely align itself with the National Farmers' Federation.
