= Division of Canning =

Australian federal electoral division

Coordinates: 32.634°S 116.113°E

Canning Australian House of Representatives Division
- Interactive map of electorate boundaries from the 2025 federal election
- Created: 1949
- MP: Andrew Hastie
- Party: Liberal Party
- Namesake: Alfred Canning; Sadie Canning (since 2021)
- Electors: 113,024 (2022)
- Area: 6,304 km^{2} (2,434.0 sq mi)
- Demographic: Outer metropolitan
Electorates around Canning:
Indian Ocean	Burt	Bullwinkel
Indian Ocean	Canning	O'Connor
Indian Ocean	Forrest	O'Connor

The Division of Canning is an Australian Electoral Division in Western Australia.

== History ==
The division was created in 1949 and is named for Alfred Canning, the Western Australian government surveyor who surveyed the Canning Stock Route. It was originally a country seat that traded hands between the two main centre-right parties, the Liberal and Country parties.

Since 1980, it has been located in the southern suburbs of the two largest cities in Western Australia, Perth and Mandurah. For most of its last three decades, it has been a highly marginal seat due to the balanced proportion of the urban north and the rural south, changing hands between the Australian Labor Party and the Liberal Party. Canning had a Liberal margin of 4.3 percent leading into the 2010 election, and was targeted by Labor, who stood high-profile candidate and former state Labor MP Alannah MacTiernan. The Liberals retained the seat; however, Canning was the only Western Australian seat to see a two-party preferred swing toward the Australian Labor Party.

A 2015 Canning by-election, triggered on 21 July following the death of Liberal Don Randall, was held on 19 September. Though the Turnbull government was just four days old, their candidate Andrew Hastie retained the seat for the Liberals, despite having to rely on preferences after a substantial, though dampened, primary (−4.15%) and two-party (−6.55%) swing away from the Liberals − solidly less than the double-digit swings polls had predicted under an Abbott government − however, some double-digit swings did eventuate among the northern suburban booths. The Canning Liberal margin was reduced from safe to marginal status. Political analysts agreed the by-election was a "good outcome for both major parties".

In 2016, the more urbanised areas of the City of Armadale west of the Albany Highway and South Western Highway, together with the suburbs of Mount Nasura and Kelmscott, were redistributed to the new Division of Burt.

In August 2021, the Australian Electoral Commission (AEC) announced that the Shire of Boddington would be transferred to the seat of O'Connor, while the Gosnells suburbs of Kenwick, Maddington, Orange Grove and part of Martin would be transferred to Burt. In addition it was announced the electorate would be jointly named after Sadie Canning, Western Australia's first Indigenous nurse (1930–2008). These boundary changes took place at the 2022 election.

== Geography ==
Since 1984, federal electoral division boundaries in Australia have been determined at redistributions by a redistribution committee appointed by the Australian Electoral Commission. Redistributions occur for the boundaries of divisions in a particular state, and they occur every seven years, or sooner if a state's representation entitlement changes or when divisions of a state are malapportioned.

The Division of Canning stretches from Byford and Carmel in the north to Wagerup in the south, and is largely based around the Peel region of Western Australia to the south of Perth.

As of the 2022 election, it includes most of the Peel region, including the City of Mandurah and the Shires of Serpentine-Jarrahdale (including Byford and Mundijong), Murray (including Pinjarra, Yunderup and Dwellingup), and Waroona (including Waroona and Preston Beach). It also includes suburbs of a more semi-rural nature in the Darling Scarp, including the Armadale suburbs of Ashendon, Bedfordale, Karragullen, Lesley, Mount Richon, Roleystone, and Wungong, part of the Gosnells suburb of Martin, and the Kalamunda suburbs of Canning Mills, Carmel, and Pickering Brook.

== Members ==
Image	Member	Party	Term	Notes
	Len Hamilton (1899–1987)	Country	10 December 1949 – 2 November 1961	Previously held the Division of Swan. Retired
	Neil McNeill (1921–2009)	Liberal	9 December 1961 – 30 November 1963	Lost seat. Later elected to the Western Australian Legislative Council in 1965
	John Hallett (1917–1999)	Country	30 November 1963 – 18 May 1974	Lost seat
	Mel Bungey (1934–2025)	Liberal	18 May 1974 – 5 March 1983	Lost seat
	Wendy Fatin (1941–)	Labor	5 March 1983 – 1 December 1984	Transferred to the Division of Brand
	George Gear (1947–)	Labor	1 December 1984 – 2 March 1996	Previously held the Division of Tangney. Served as Chief Government Whip in the House under Hawke and Keating. Served as minister under Keating. Lost seat
	Ricky Johnston (1943–)	Liberal	2 March 1996 – 3 October 1998	Lost seat
	Jane Gerick (1963–2003)	Labor	3 October 1998 – 10 November 2001	Lost seat
	Don Randall (1953–2015)	Liberal	10 November 2001 – 21 July 2015	Previously held the Division of Swan. Died in office
	Andrew Hastie (1982–)	Liberal	19 September 2015 – present	Incumbent

== Election results ==
2025 Australian federal election: Canning
Party	Candidate	Votes	%	±%
Liberal	Andrew Hastie	42,794	42.52	+0.95
Labor	Jarrad Goold	30,098	29.90	−5.08
One Nation	Fernando Bove	11,488	11.41	+6.79
Greens	Jordan Cahill	8,967	8.91	+0.59
Legalise Cannabis	Paul Gullan (disendorsed)	6,216	6.18	+6.18
Citizens	John Carey	1,084	1.08	+1.08
Total formal votes		100,647	96.69	+3.20
Informal votes		3,450	3.31	−3.20
Turnout		104,097	87.28	+4.96
Two-party-preferred result
Liberal	Andrew Hastie	56,917	56.55	+5.35
Labor	Jarrad Goold	43,730	43.45	−5.35
Liberal hold		Swing	+5.35	

== See also ==
- 2015 Canning by-election
