= 1983 Australian House of Representatives election =

This is a list of electoral division results for the Australian 1983 federal election.

== Overall ==
Government (75) Labor (75) Opposition (50) Coalition Liberal (33) National (17)

House of Reps (IRV) – 1983–84—Turnout 94.64% (CV) – Informal 2.09%
Party	First preference votes	%	Swing	Seats	Change
Labor	4,297,392	49.48	+4.34	75	▲24
Liberal–National coalition	3,787,151	43.61	–2.79	50	▼24
Liberal	2,983,986	34.36	−3.07	33	▼21
National	782,824	9.01	+0.27	17	▼2
Country Liberal	20,471	0.24	+0.01	0	▼1
Democrats	437,265	5.03	−1.54		
Socialist Workers	46,080	0.53	+0.33		
Democratic Labor	17,318	0.20	–0.11		
Green	8,641	0.10	+0.10		
Progress	6,652	0.08	–0.13		
Communist	6,398	0.07	–0.07		
Socialist Labour	6,327	0.07	–0.05		
Socialist	4,165	0.05	+0.05		
Deadly Serious	3,810	0.04	+0.04		
NPWA	3,686	0.04	–0.07		
Christian	3,016	0.03	+0.01		
Imperial British Conservative	1,786	0.02	+0.00		
National Humanitarian	1,687	0.02	+0.02		
Australia	844	0.01	+0.00		
Libertarian	732	0.01	+0.01		
Conservative Nationalist	600	0.01	+0.01		
Engineered Australia Plan	292	0.00	+0.00		
Independent	50,891	0.59	–0.11		
Total	8,684,862			125	
Two-party-preferred (estimated)
Labor		53.23	+3.6	75	▲24
Coalition		46.77	−3.6	50	▼24
Invalid/blank votes	185,312	2.1			
Turnout	8,870,175	94.6			
Registered voters	9,372,064				
Source: Federal Election Results 1949-1993

== New South Wales ==
1983 Australian federal election (New South Wales)
- 5 March 1983

All 43 NSW seats in the House of Representatives 22 seats needed for a majority
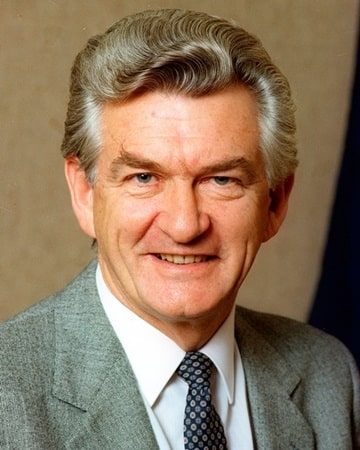

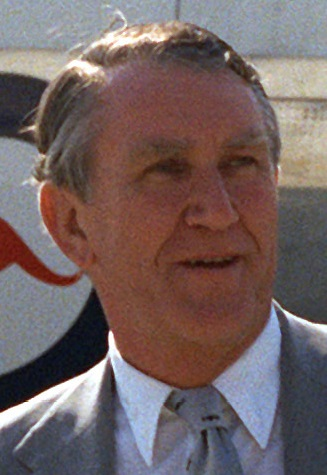
	First party	Second party
Leader	Bob Hawke	Malcolm Fraser
Party	Labor	Coalition
Seats before	18	25
Seats won	24	19
Seat change	▲6	▼6
Primary vote	1,512,012	1,282,458
Percentage	50.10%	42.60%
Swing	▲3.70pp	▼3.60pp
TPP	54.09%	45.91%
TPP swing	▲3.69pp	▼3.69pp

=== Banks ===
This section is an excerpt from Electoral results for the Division of Banks § 1983

1983 Australian federal election: Banks
Party	Candidate	Votes	%	±%
Labor	John Mountford	39,013	57.8	+4.2
Liberal	Andrew Fairbairn	23,962	35.5	−1.3
Democrats	Montague Greene	3,908	5.8	−3.8
Socialist Workers	David Holmes	572	0.8	+0.8
Total formal votes		67,455	97.6	+0.1
Informal votes		1,639	2.4	−0.1
Turnout		69,094	95.7	−0.2
Two-party-preferred result
Labor	John Mountford	41,226	61.12	+2.32
Liberal	Andrew Fairbairn	26,229	38.88	−2.32
Labor hold		Swing	+2.32	

=== Barton ===
This section is an excerpt from Electoral results for the Division of Barton § 1983

1983 Australian federal election: Barton
Party	Candidate	Votes	%	±%
Labor	Gary Punch	31,308	49.7	+2.6
Liberal	Jim Bradfield	26,086	41.4	−5.0
Independent	Bruce Barton	3,153	5.0	+5.0
Democrats	Ronald George	1,812	2.9	−0.9
Independent	Jean Lindsay	284	0.5	+0.5
Progress	Peter Wright	172	0.3	+0.3
Independent	Charles Bellchambers	166	0.3	−2.4
Total formal votes		62,981	97.7	
Informal votes		1,478	2.3	
Turnout		64,459	95.6	
Two-party-preferred result
Labor	Gary Punch	32,845	52.15	+2.55
Liberal	Jim Bradfield	30,136	47.85	−2.55
Labor gain from Liberal		Swing	+2.55	

=== Bennelong ===
This section is an excerpt from Electoral results for the Division of Bennelong § 1983

1983 Australian federal election: Bennelong
Party	Candidate	Votes	%	±%
Liberal	John Howard	33,721	50.3	−3.6
Labor	Donald Vickers	23,799	35.5	−0.7
South West Coalition	Milo Dunphy	8,495	12.7	+12.7
Independent	Steve Gabell	1,000	1.5	+1.5
Total formal votes		67,015	98.1	
Informal votes		1,297	1.9	
Turnout		68,312	95.9	
Two-party-preferred result
Liberal	John Howard	37,330	55.70	−2.70
Labor	Donald Vickers	29,685	44.30	+2.70
Liberal hold		Swing	−2.70	

=== Berowra ===
This section is an excerpt from Electoral results for the Division of Berowra § 1983

1983 Australian federal election: Berowra
Party	Candidate	Votes	%	±%
Liberal	Harry Edwards	40,676	60.1	−1.3
Labor	Maurice Marshan	20,943	31.0	+1.5
Democrats	Pamela Tuckwell	6,015	8.9	−0.2
Total formal votes		67,634	98.3	
Informal votes		1,166	1.7	
Turnout		68,800	95.5	
Two-party-preferred result
Liberal	Harry Edwards	43,209	63.89	−1.11
Labor	Maurice Marshan	24,425	36.11	+1.11
Liberal hold		Swing	−1.11	

=== Blaxland ===
This section is an excerpt from Electoral results for the Division of Blaxland § 1983

1983 Australian federal election: Blaxland
Party	Candidate	Votes	%	±%
Labor	Paul Keating	41,609	62.9	+3.3
Liberal	David Brown	21,604	32.7	+1.7
Democrats	Phillip Grattan	2,504	3.8	+0.5
Socialist Workers	Siong Hoe Goh	388	0.6	−4.4
Total formal votes		66,105	96.5	
Informal votes		2,407	3.5	
Turnout		68,512	94.6	
Two-party-preferred result
Labor	Paul Keating	42,982	65.02	−2.18
Liberal	David Brown	23,123	34.98	+2.18
Labor hold		Swing	−2.18	

=== Bradfield ===
This section is an excerpt from Electoral results for the Division of Bradfield § 1983

1983 Australian federal election: Bradfield
Party	Candidate	Votes	%	±%
Liberal	David Connolly	49,566	72.1	−3.0
Labor	Peter Donovan	14,535	21.1	+3.5
Democrats	Anthony Dunne	4,674	6.8	−0.5
Total formal votes		68,775	98.6	
Informal votes		988	1.4	
Turnout		69,763	95.8	
Two-party-preferred result
Liberal	David Connolly	51,367	74.69	−3.41
Labor	Peter Donovan	17,408	25.31	+3.41
Liberal hold		Swing	−3.41	

=== Calare ===
This section is an excerpt from Electoral results for the Division of Calare § 1983

1983 Australian federal election: Calare
Party	Candidate	Votes	%	±%
Labor	David Simmons	35,089	50.6	+4.3
National	Sandy Mackenzie	31,087	44.9	−5.1
Democrats	Ann Ritter	2,562	3.7	+0.0
Progress	George Simpson	566	0.8	+0.8
Total formal votes		69,304	98.8	
Informal votes		870	1.2	
Turnout		70.174	96.4	
Two-party-preferred result
Labor	David Simmons	36,761	53.0	+4.5
National	Sandy Mackenzie	32,543	47.0	−4.5
Labor gain from National		Swing	+4.5	

=== Chifley ===
This section is an excerpt from Electoral results for the Division of Chifley § 1983

1983 Australian federal election: Chifley
Party	Candidate	Votes	%	±%
Labor	Russ Gorman	44,419	61.2	−4.0
Liberal	Edna Mitchell	16,565	22.8	−4.2
Socialist Workers	Christine Broi	4,556	6.3	+6.3
Independent	Jonathan Cooper	3,744	5.2	+5.2
Democrats	Frances Jones	2,187	3.0	−0.6
Independent	Jane Smith/New	1,114	1.5	+1.5
Total formal votes		72,586	95.8	
Informal votes		3,169	4.2	
Turnout		75,755	95.0	
Two-party-preferred result
Labor	Russ Gorman	52,525	72.4	+2.3
Liberal	Edna Mitchell	20,061	27.6	−2.3
Labor hold		Swing	+2.3	

=== Cook ===
This section is an excerpt from Electoral results for the Division of Cook § 1983

1983 Australian federal election: Cook
Party	Candidate	Votes	%	±%
Labor	Michael Addison	34,803	49.2	+8.5
Liberal	Don Dobie	34,666	49.0	−3.1
Progress	Henry Soper	1,213	1.7	+0.8
Total formal votes		70,682	98.6	
Informal votes		1,022	1.4	
Turnout		71,704	96.4	
Two-party-preferred result
Liberal	Don Dobie	35,415	50.1	−5.0
Labor	Michael Addison	35,267	49.9	+5.0
Liberal hold		Swing	−5.0	

=== Cowper ===
This section is an excerpt from Electoral results for the Division of Cowper § 1983

1983 Australian federal election: Cowper
Party	Candidate	Votes	%	±%
National	Ian Robinson	38,351	48.4	−6.1
Labor	Joseph Moran	33,986	42.9	+2.5
Democrats	Peter Brown	6,962	8.8	+3.8
Total formal votes		79,299	98.8	
Informal votes		982	1.2	
Turnout		80,281	95.2	
Two-party-preferred result
National	Ian Robinson	41,305	52.1	−4.4
Labor	Joseph Moran	37,994	47.9	+4.4
National hold		Swing	−4.4	

=== Cunningham ===
This section is an excerpt from Electoral results for the Division of Cunningham § 1983

1983 Australian federal election: Cunningham
Party	Candidate	Votes	%	±%
Labor	Stewart West	46,419	63.2	+7.3
Liberal	Gary Fisher	17,874	24.3	−6.2
Democrats	George Jones	4,986	6.8	−0.4
Socialist Workers	Diana Covell	2,802	3.8	+2.1
Communist	Romaine Rutnam	704	1.0	−2.6
Socialist Labour	Rudolf Pasara	689	0.9	−0.2
Total formal votes		73,474	97.0	
Informal votes		2,260	3.0	
Turnout		75,734	95.2	
Two-party-preferred result
Labor	Stewart West	50,399	68.6	+3.5
Liberal	Gary Fisher	23,075	31.4	−3.5
Labor hold		Swing	+3.5	

=== Dundas ===
This section is an excerpt from Electoral results for the Division of Dundas § 1983

1983 Australian federal election: Dundas
Party	Candidate	Votes	%	±%
Liberal	Philip Ruddock	33,509	50.1	−3.1
Labor	Margaret Blaxell	29,727	44.4	+6.7
Democrats	John Tumminello	3,712	5.5	−1.8
Total formal votes		66,948	98.3	
Informal votes		1,133	1.7	
Turnout		68,081	95.4	
Two-party-preferred result
Liberal	Philip Ruddock	35,299	52.7	−5.7
Labor	Margaret Blaxell	31,649	47.3	+5.7
Liberal hold		Swing	−5.7	

=== Eden-Monaro ===
This section is an excerpt from Electoral results for the Division of Eden-Monaro § 1983

1983 Australian federal election: Eden-Monaro
Party	Candidate	Votes	%	±%
Labor	Jim Snow	36,401	49.1	+4.0
Liberal	Murray Sainsbury	33,141	44.7	−5.1
Independent	Miriam Naughton	2,333	3.1	+3.1
Democrats	Russell Witt	1,977	2.7	−2.4
True Independent	Ronald Sarina	260	0.4	+0.4
Total formal votes		74,112	98.3	
Informal votes		1,302	1.7	
Turnout		75,414	95.7	
Two-party-preferred result
Labor	Jim Snow	38,222	51.6	+4.4
Liberal	Murray Sainsbury	35,890	48.4	−4.4
Labor gain from Liberal		Swing	+4.4	

=== Farrer ===
This section is an excerpt from Electoral results for the Division of Farrer § 1983

1983 Australian federal election: Farrer
Party	Candidate	Votes	%	±%
Liberal	Wal Fife	40,060	57.4	−1.0
Labor	Noel Diffey	27,168	38.9	+5.3
Democrats	Scott Milne	1,872	2.7	−4.1
Progress	Maureen Nathan	740	1.1	−0.1
Total formal votes		69,840	98.6	
Informal votes		970	1.4	
Turnout		70,810	95.1	
Two-party-preferred result
Liberal	Wal Fife	41,347	59.2	−2.6
Labor	Noel Diffey	28,493	40.8	+2.6
Liberal hold		Swing	−2.6	

=== Grayndler ===
This section is an excerpt from Electoral results for the Division of Grayndler § 1983

1983 Australian federal election: Grayndler
Party	Candidate	Votes	%	±%
Labor	Leo McLeay	34,679	58.9	+1.4
Liberal	Edward James	17,508	29.7	−5.0
Socialist	David Gibson	3,434	5.8	+3.4
Democrats	Albert Jarman	1,831	3.1	−0.1
Communist	Joseph Owens	1,008	1.7	+1.7
Socialist Workers	Michael Karadjis	432	0.7	+0.7
Total formal votes		58,892	95.8	
Informal votes		2,564	4.2	
Turnout		61,456	92.9	
Two-party-preferred result
Labor	Leo McLeay	37,208	63.2	−0.3
Liberal	Edward James	21,684	36.8	+0.3
Labor hold		Swing	−0.3	

=== Gwydir ===
This section is an excerpt from Electoral results for the Division of Gwydir § 1983

1983 Australian federal election: Gwydir
Party	Candidate	Votes	%	±%
National	Ralph Hunt	38,839	57.0	−1.4
Labor	Robert Hamilton	25,585	37.6	+2.1
Democrats	Gloria Collison	3,711	5.4	−0.6
Total formal votes		68,135	98.7	
Informal votes		932	1.3	
Turnout		69,067	94.5	
Two-party-preferred result
National	Ralph Hunt		58.8	−1.6
Labor	Robert Hamilton		41.2	+1.6
National hold		Swing	−1.6	

=== Hughes ===
This section is an excerpt from Electoral results for the Division of Hughes § 1983

1983 Australian federal election: Hughes
Party	Candidate	Votes	%	±%
Labor	Les Johnson	46,667	61.6	+4.6
Liberal	Peter Somerville	21,467	28.4	−5.3
Democrats	Ronald Hellyer	6,899	9.1	+0.8
Socialist Workers	Stephen Painter	672	0.9	+0.9
Total formal votes		75,705	98.2	
Informal votes		1,363	1.8	
Turnout		77,068	96.1	
Two-party-preferred result
Labor	Les Johnson		68.3	+6.2
Liberal	Peter Somerville		31.7	−6.2
Labor hold		Swing	+6.2	

=== Hume ===
This section is an excerpt from Electoral results for the Division of Hume § 1983

1983 Australian federal election: Hume
Party	Candidate	Votes	%	±%
National	Stephen Lusher	36,217	54.2	−1.8
Labor	Marie McCormick	27,195	40.7	−1.1
Democrats	Gregory Butler	3,419	5.1	+2.9
Total formal votes		66,831	98.9	
Informal votes		762	1.1	
Turnout		67,593	95.9	
Two-party-preferred result
National	Stephen Lusher		56.8	−0.1
Labor	Marie McCormick		43.2	+0.1
National hold		Swing	−0.1	

=== Hunter ===
This section is an excerpt from Electoral results for the Division of Hunter § 1983

1983 Australian federal election: Hunter
Party	Candidate	Votes	%	±%
Labor	Bob Brown	54,213	68.1	+0.2
Liberal	James White	19,508	24.5	−2.0
Democrats	Edwina Wilson	5,942	7.5	+1.9
Total formal votes		79,663	98.2	
Informal votes		1,492	1.8	
Turnout		81,155	95.9	
Two-party-preferred result
Labor	Bob Brown		72.6	+1.3
Liberal	James White		27.4	−1.3
Labor hold		Swing	+1.3	

=== Kingsford Smith ===
This section is an excerpt from Electoral results for the Division of Kingsford Smith § 1983

1983 Australian federal election: Kingsford-Smith
Party	Candidate	Votes	%	±%
Labor	Lionel Bowen	45,168	70.4	+0.9
Liberal	Collin O'Neill	16,090	25.1	−1.9
Democrats	Anthony Larkings	1,987	3.1	−0.3
Socialist Workers	Geoffrey Channells	869	1.4	+1.4
Total formal votes		64,114	97.2	
Informal votes		1,845	2.8	
Turnout		65,959	93.9	
Two-party-preferred result
Labor	Lionel Bowen		73.5	+2.0
Liberal	Collin O'Neill		26.5	−2.0
Labor hold		Swing	+2.0	

=== Lowe ===
This section is an excerpt from Electoral results for the Division of Lowe § 1983

1983 Australian federal election: Lowe
Party	Candidate	Votes	%	±%
Labor	Michael Maher	33,619	51.8	+5.4
Liberal	Philip Taylor	27,633	42.6	−6.1
Democrats	Ralph Rogers	2,030	3.1	+0.1
Socialist Workers	Helen Jarvis	1,572	2.4	+2.4
Total formal votes		64,854	97.3	
Informal votes		1,767	2.7	
Turnout		66,621	95.9	
Two-party-preferred result
Labor	Michael Maher		55.9	+7.0
Liberal	Philip Taylor		44.1	−7.0
Labor hold		Swing	+7.0	

=== Lyne ===
This section is an excerpt from Electoral results for the Division of Lyne § 1983

1983 Australian federal election: Lyne
Party	Candidate	Votes	%	±%
National	Bruce Cowan	40,140	50.4	+18.6
Labor	Francis Murray	31,877	40.1	+2.4
Democrats	Stephen Jeffries	3,953	5.0	+2.6
Independent	John Bryant	2,800	3.5	+3.5
Independent	Alfred Cannings	514	0.6	+0.6
Progress	John Veenstra	284	0.4	+0.4
Total formal votes		79,568	98.3	
Informal votes		1,343	1.7	
Turnout		80,911	95.9	
Two-party-preferred result
National	Bruce Cowan		55.3	−3.6
Labor	Francis Murray		44.7	+3.6
National hold		Swing	−3.6	

=== Macarthur ===
This section is an excerpt from Electoral results for the Division of Macarthur § 1983

1983 Australian federal election: Macarthur
Party	Candidate	Votes	%	±%
Labor	Colin Hollis	39,904	49.5	+5.5
Liberal	Michael Baume	36,725	45.5	−5.7
Democrats	Frederic Goodfellow	3,515	4.4	+0.2
Independent	Martin Essenberg	510	0.6	+0.6
Total formal votes		80,654	98.5	
Informal votes		1,195	1.5	
Turnout		81,849	95.4	
Two-party-preferred result
Labor	Colin Hollis	42,041	52.1	+5.3
Liberal	Michael Baume	38,613	47.9	−5.3
Labor gain from Liberal		Swing	+5.3	

=== Mackellar ===
This section is an excerpt from Electoral results for the Division of Mackellar § 1983

1983 Australian federal election: Mackellar
Party	Candidate	Votes	%	±%
Liberal	Jim Carlton	36,587	55.6	−4.6
Labor	Keith Jackson	24,292	36.9	+5.2
Democrats	Robert Williams	4,055	6.2	−1.9
Independent	Maurice Foley	813	1.2	+1.2
Total formal votes		65,747	98.1	
Informal votes		1,253	1.9	
Turnout		67,000	94.2	
Two-party-preferred result
Liberal	Jim Carlton		58.7	−4.8
Labor	Keith Jackson		41.3	+4.8
Liberal hold		Swing	−4.8	

=== Macquarie ===
This section is an excerpt from Electoral results for the Division of Macquarie § 1983

1983 Australian federal election: Macquarie
Party	Candidate	Votes	%	±%
Labor	Ross Free	50,272	57.3	+10.6
Liberal	Stephen Screech	30,966	35.3	−8.7
Democrats	Richard Jackson-Hope	6,573	7.5	+1.7
Total formal votes		87,811	98.0	
Informal votes		1,773	2.0	
Turnout		89,584	95.9	
Two-party-preferred result
Labor	Ross Free		61.8	+9.0
Liberal	Stephen Screech		38.2	−9.0
Labor hold		Swing	+9.0	

=== Mitchell ===
This section is an excerpt from Electoral results for the Division of Mitchell § 1983

1983 Australian federal election: Mitchell
Party	Candidate	Votes	%	±%
Liberal	Alan Cadman	48,797	58.4	−4.8
Labor	Arthur Llewellyn	30,298	36.3	+5.6
Democrats	Rona Samuels	4,450	5.3	−0.8
Total formal votes		83,545	98.1	
Informal votes		1,623	1.9	
Turnout		85,168	95.1	
Two-party-preferred result
Liberal	Alan Cadman		60.5	−5.1
Labor	Arthur Llewellyn		39.5	+5.1
Liberal hold		Swing	−5.1	

=== New England ===
This section is an excerpt from Electoral results for the Division of New England § 1983

1983 Australian federal election: New England
Party	Candidate	Votes	%	±%
National	Ian Sinclair	33,335	49.8	−2.9
Labor	Lawrence Daly	29,812	44.5	+6.6
Democrats	Ian Dutton	3,814	5.7	−3.7
Total formal votes		66,961	98.9	
Informal votes		774	1.1	
Turnout		67,735	95.5	
Two-party-preferred result
National	Ian Sinclair	35,276	52.7	−3.8
Labor	Lawrence Daly	31,685	47.3	+3.8
National hold		Swing	−3.8	

=== Newcastle ===
This section is an excerpt from Electoral results for the Division of Newcastle1983

1983 Australian federal election: Newcastle
Party	Candidate	Votes	%	±%
Labor	Allan Morris	39,003	59.6	+1.6
Liberal	Stan Hayward	17,842	27.3	−7.2
Democrats	Wayne Jarman	2,951	4.5	+1.3
Independent	Frank Blefari	2,355	3.6	+3.6
Communist	Darrell Dawson	1,732	2.6	+0.1
Independent	Brian McDermott	959	1.5	+1.5
Socialist Workers	Geoffrey Payne	573	0.9	+1.0
Total formal votes		65,415	97.3	
Informal votes		1,838	2.7	
Turnout		67,253	95.6	
Two-party-preferred result
Labor	Allan Morris		67.5	+3.7
Liberal	Stan Hayward		32.5	−3.7
Labor hold		Swing	+3.7	

=== North Sydney ===
This section is an excerpt from Electoral results for the Division of North Sydney § 1983

1983 Australian federal election: North Sydney
Party	Candidate	Votes	%	±%
Liberal	John Spender	35,544	57.6	−2.4
Labor	Kirk McKenzie	21,096	34.2	+3.0
Democrats	Rodney Dominish	5,024	8.1	+2.3
Total formal votes		61,664	98.1	
Informal votes		1,214	1.9	
Turnout		62,878	92.1	
Two-party-preferred result
Liberal	John Spender		60.4	−4.1
Labor	Kirk McKenzie		39.6	+4.1
Liberal hold		Swing	−4.1	

=== Parramatta ===
This section is an excerpt from Electoral results for the Division of Parramatta § 1983

1983 Australian federal election: Parramatta
Party	Candidate	Votes	%	±%
Labor	John Brown	41,951	62.2	+8.2
Liberal	James Harker-Mortlock	20,608	30.6	−4.2
Democrats	Patricia Lamey	3,361	5.0	−4.3
Socialist Workers	Mark Carey	1,519	2.2	+2.2
Total formal votes		67,439	97.1	
Informal votes		2,025	2.9	
Turnout		69,464	93.9	
Two-party-preferred result
Labor	John Brown		67.2	+7.0
Liberal	James Harker-Mortlock		32.8	−7.0
Labor hold		Swing	+7.0	

=== Paterson ===
This section is an excerpt from Electoral results for the Division of Paterson § 1983

1983 Australian federal election: Paterson
Party	Candidate	Votes	%	±%
National	Frank O'Keefe	37,028	54.1	−1.0
Labor	Michael Williams	28,412	41.5	+3.8
Democrats	Darrel Woodhouse	3,048	4.5	−1.9
Total formal votes		68,488	98.6	
Informal votes		938	1.4	
Turnout		69,426	95.0	
Two-party-preferred result
National	Frank O'Keefe		55.9	−1.8
Labor	Michael Williams		44.1	+1.8
National hold		Swing	−1.8	

=== Phillip ===
This section is an excerpt from Electoral results for the Division of Phillip § 1983

1983 Australian federal election: Phillip
Party	Candidate	Votes	%	±%
Labor	Jeannette McHugh	29,909	49.7	+3.7
Liberal	Jack Birney	27,903	46.4	−2.3
Democrats	Karin Sowada	1,698	2.8	−1.8
Engineered Australia	Lawrence Hogan	292	0.5	+0.5
Progress	Timothy Daly	248	0.4	+0.4
Greens	Julien Droulers	146	0.2	+0.2
Total formal votes		60,196	97.2	
Informal votes		1,762	2.8	
Turnout		61,958	92.7	
Two-party-preferred result
Labor	Jeannette McHugh		51.9	+2.5
Liberal	Jack Birney		48.1	−2.5
Labor gain from Liberal		Swing	+2.5	

=== Prospect ===
This section is an excerpt from Electoral results for the Division of Prospect § 1983

1983 Australian federal election: Prospect
Party	Candidate	Votes	%	±%
Labor	Dick Klugman	46,793	63.1	+5.2
Liberal	Alan Byers	25,315	34.1	−2.5
Socialist Workers	Richard Nichols	1,320	1.8	+1.8
Independent	Eric Viitala	714	1.0	−0.4
Total formal votes		74,142	96.1	
Informal votes		3,047	3.9	
Turnout		77,189	93.9	
Two-party-preferred result
Labor	Dick Klugman		65.2	+4.0
Liberal	Alan Byers		34.8	−4.0
Labor hold		Swing	+4.0	

=== Reid ===
This section is an excerpt from Electoral results for the Division of Reid § 1983

1983 Australian federal election: Reid
Party	Candidate	Votes	%	±%
Labor	Tom Uren	37,839	61.7	+0.1
Liberal	Yvonne Maio	17,089	27.9	−2.2
Democrats	Stephen Bastian	4,770	7.8	+5.3
Socialist Workers	Lynda Boland	723	1.2	+1.2
Independent	Neville Gray	646	1.1	−4.7
Independent	Michael Gluyas	259	0.4	+0.4
Total formal votes		61,326	95.9	
Informal votes		2,622	4.1	
Turnout		63,948	94.1	
Two-party-preferred result
Labor	Tom Uren		67.6	+2.1
Liberal	Yvonne Maio		32.4	−2.1
Labor hold		Swing	+2.1	

=== Richmond ===
This section is an excerpt from Electoral results for the Division of Richmond § 1983

1983 Australian federal election: Richmond
Party	Candidate	Votes	%	±%
National	Doug Anthony	42,684	53.0	−3.9
Labor	Terence McGee	31,967	39.7	+3.7
Democrats	Kenneth Nicholson	5,906	7.3	+0.2
Total formal votes		80,557	98.9	
Informal votes		922	1.1	
Turnout		81,479	95.3	
Two-party-preferred result
National	Doug Anthony		55.9	−4.4
Labor	Terence McGee		44.1	+4.4
National hold		Swing	−4.4	

=== Riverina ===
This section is an excerpt from Electoral results for the Division of Riverina § 1983

1983 Australian federal election: Riverina
Party	Candidate	Votes	%	±%
National	Noel Hicks	32,976	49.2	+16.1
Labor	Ronald Adams	32,587	48.6	+1.7
Democrats	Lesley Holschier	1,495	2.2	+0.0
Total formal votes		67,058	97.8	
Informal votes		1,495	2.2	
Turnout		68,072	94.7	
Two-party-preferred result
National	Noel Hicks	33,820	50.4	−0.1
Labor	Ronald Adams	33,238	49.6	+0.1
National hold		Swing	−0.1	

=== Robertson ===
This section is an excerpt from Electoral results for the Division of Robertson § 1983

1983 Australian federal election: Robertson
Party	Candidate	Votes	%	±%
Labor	Barry Cohen	46,058	55.0	+2.6
Liberal	Bev Austin	31,631	37.8	−0.5
Democrats	Trevor Willsher	5,980	7.1	+1.3
Total formal votes		83,669	98.4	
Informal votes		1,355	1.6	
Turnout		85,024	95.1	
Two-party-preferred result
Labor	Barry Cohen		59.3	+1.2
Liberal	Bev Austin		40.7	−1.2
Labor hold		Swing	+1.2	

=== Shortland ===
This section is an excerpt from Electoral results for the Division of Shortland § 1983

1983 Australian federal election: Shortland
Party	Candidate	Votes	%	±%
Labor	Peter Morris	49,275	62.7	+1.7
Liberal	Peter Wilson	20,781	26.4	−1.2
Democrats	Lyn Godfrey	4,677	6.0	−0.8
Socialist Workers	Peter Abrahamson	2,584	3.3	+3.3
Socialist Labour	Robert Buhler	1,280	1.6	+1.6
Total formal votes		78,597	98.2	
Informal votes		1,455	1.8	
Turnout		80,052	96.3	
Two-party-preferred result
Labor	Peter Morris		70.8	+1.5
Liberal	Peter Wilson		29.2	−1.5
Labor hold		Swing	+1.5	

=== St George ===
This section is an excerpt from Electoral results for the Division of St George § 1983

1983 Australian federal election: St George
Party	Candidate	Votes	%	±%
Labor	Bill Morrison	37,570	57.8	+4.4
Liberal	George James	23,933	36.8	−6.0
Independent	Brian Compton	1,806	2.8	+2.8
Democrats	Ronald Kirkwood	1,210	1.9	−1.9
Socialist Workers	Dorothy Tumney	477	0.7	+0.7
Total formal votes		64,996	97.3	
Informal votes		1,809	2.7	
Turnout		66,805	95.6	
Two-party-preferred result
Labor	Bill Morrison		60.5	+4.4
Liberal	George James		39.5	−4.4
Labor hold		Swing	+4.4	

=== Sydney ===
This section is an excerpt from Electoral results for the Division of Sydney § 1983

1983 Australian federal election: Sydney
Party	Candidate	Votes	%	±%
Labor	Peter Baldwin	40,360	67.2	+5.2
Liberal	Ron Cibas	12,559	20.9	−1.7
Democrats	Jennifer Macleod	4,286	7.1	−1.0
Communist	Aileen Beaver	2,066	3.4	−1.4
Socialist Workers	James Percy	758	1.3	−2.2
Total formal votes		60,029	96.8	
Informal votes		1,954	3.2	
Turnout		61,983	90.2	
Two-party-preferred result
Labor	Peter Baldwin		75.7	+1.9
Liberal	Ron Cibas		24.3	−1.9
Labor hold		Swing	+1.9	

=== Warringah ===
This section is an excerpt from Electoral results for the Division of Warringah § 1983

1983 Australian federal election: Warringah
Party	Candidate	Votes	%	±%
Liberal	Michael MacKellar	36,549	58.0	−4.5
Labor	John Coombs	23,507	37.3	+8.9
Democrats	Annique Duc	2,403	3.8	−2.5
Progress	Stephen Markey	509	0.8	+0.8
Total formal votes		62,968	98.5	
Informal votes		974	1.5	
Turnout		63,942	95.0	
Two-party-preferred result
Liberal	Michael MacKellar		60.2	−7.2
Labor	John Coombs		39.8	+7.2
Liberal hold		Swing	−7.2	

=== Wentworth ===
This section is an excerpt from Electoral results for the Division of Wentworth § 1983

1983 Australian federal election: Wentworth
Party	Candidate	Votes	%	±%
Liberal	Peter Coleman	31,759	54.7	−5.8
Labor	Max Pearce	20,301	34.9	+1.6
Independent	Katherine Wentworth	2,787	4.8	+4.8
Democrats	Brian Hillman	2,474	4.3	−1.9
Independent	George Warnecke	401	0.7	+0.7
Independent	Robert McCarthy	251	0.4	+0.4
Independent	Neil Roberts	115	0.2	+0.2
Total formal votes		58,088	97.3	
Informal votes		1,591	2.7	
Turnout		59,679	91.3	
Two-party-preferred result
Liberal	Peter Coleman		62.4	−0.6
Labor	Max Pearce		37.6	+0.6
Liberal hold		Swing	−0.6	

=== Werriwa ===
This section is an excerpt from Electoral results for the Division of Werriwa § 1983

1983 Australian federal election: Werriwa
Party	Candidate	Votes	%	±%
Labor	John Kerin	52,584	63.2	+5.3
Liberal	Marie Rutledge	23,586	28.3	−2.1
Independent	David Brandon	4,714	5.7	+5.7
Socialist Labour	Dorothea Brocksop	1,351	1.6	+1.6
Socialist Workers	Gail Cumming	1,025	1.2	+1.2
Total formal votes		83,260	97.0	
Informal votes		2,584	3.0	
Turnout		85,844	94.4	
Two-party-preferred result
Labor	John Kerin		69.1	+2.5
Liberal	Marie Rutledge		30.9	−2.5
Labor hold		Swing	+2.5	

== Victoria ==
1983 Australian federal election (Victoria)
- 5 March 1983

All 33 Victorian seats in the House of Representatives 17 seats needed for a majority
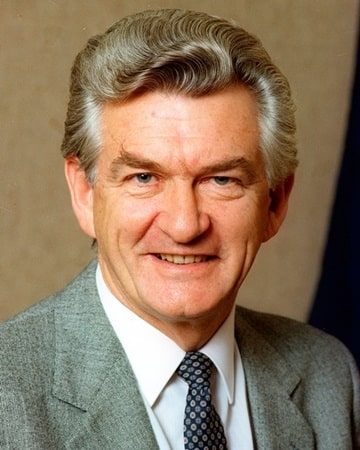

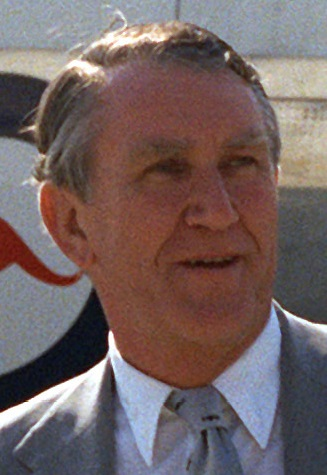
	First party	Second party
Leader	Bob Hawke	Malcolm Fraser
Party	Labor	Coalition
Seats before	17	16
Seats won	23	10
Seat change	▲6	▼6
Primary vote	1,182,247	983,47
Percentage	50.50%	42.0%
Swing	▲2.00pp	▼2.00pp
TPP	54.50%	45.50%
TPP swing	▲3.90pp	▼3.90pp

=== Balaclava ===
This section is an excerpt from Electoral results for the Division of Balaclava § 1983

1983 Australian federal election: Balaclava
Party	Candidate	Votes	%	±%
Liberal	Ian Macphee	31,642	50.1	−1.5
Labor	Chris Kennedy	25,867	41.0	+4.8
Democrats	Zelma Furey	5,004	7.9	−4.3
Conservative Nationalist	Timothy Warner	600	1.0	+1.0
Total formal votes		63,113	98.1	
Informal votes		1,218	1.9	
Turnout		64,331	95.0	
Two-party-preferred result
Liberal	Ian Macphee		53.4	−2.7
Labor	Chris Kennedy		46.6	+2.7
Liberal hold		Swing	−2.7	

=== Ballaarat ===
This section is an excerpt from Electoral results for the Division of Ballarat § 1983

1983 Australian federal election: Ballarat
Party	Candidate	Votes	%	±%
Labor	John Mildren	34,616	50.7	+5.5
Liberal	John Ronan	30,078	44.1	−1.9
Democrats	Graham Gough	2,123	3.1	−2.5
Independent	John Blower	1,148	1.7	+1.7
Independent	Albert Ireland	275	0.4	+0.4
Total formal votes		68,240	98.3	
Informal votes		1,156	1.7	
Turnout		69,396	96.9	
Two-party-preferred result
Labor	John Mildren		54.1	+3.4
Liberal	John Ronan		45.9	−3.4
Labor hold		Swing	+3.4	

=== Batman ===
This section is an excerpt from Electoral results for the Division of Batman § 1983

1983 Australian federal election: Batman
Party	Candidate	Votes	%	±%
Labor	Brian Howe	42,398	63.7	+8.2
Liberal	Maxwell Playford	19,193	28.8	−2.3
Democrats	Gwendoline Naug	2,836	4.3	−1.7
Democratic Labor	Philip L'Huillier	1,756	2.6	−4.8
Socialist Workers	John Percy	380	0.6	+0.6
Total formal votes		66,563	97.1	
Informal votes		1,983	2.9	
Turnout		68,546	95.7	
Two-party-preferred result
Labor	Brian Howe		77.1	+6.4
Liberal	Maxwell Playford		22.9	−6.4
Labor hold		Swing	+6.4	

=== Bendigo ===
This section is an excerpt from Electoral results for the Division of Bendigo § 1983

1983 Australian federal election: Bendigo
Party	Candidate	Votes	%	±%
Labor	John Brumby	34,908	49.7	+5.7
Liberal	John Bourchier	30,352	43.2	−4.1
Democrats	Neil Jewell	3,078	4.4	−4.4
Democratic Labor	Robert Denahy	1,859	2.6	+2.6
Total formal votes		70,197	98.6	
Informal votes		968	1.4	
Turnout		71,165	96.7	
Two-party-preferred result
Labor	John Brumby		52.8	+4.1
Liberal	John Bourchier		47.2	−4.1
Labor gain from Liberal		Swing	+4.1	

=== Bruce ===
This section is an excerpt from Electoral results for the Division of Bruce § 1983

1983 Australian federal election: Bruce
Party	Candidate	Votes	%	±%
Liberal	Sir Billy Snedden	36,381	47.9	−0.9
Labor	Heather O'Connor	33,650	44.3	+6.0
Democrats	Michael Johnson	5,955	7.8	−3.3
Total formal votes		75,986	98.3	
Informal votes		1,292	1.7	
Turnout		77,278	97.3	
Two-party-preferred result
Liberal	Sir Billy Snedden	38,544	50.7	−4.7
Labor	Heather O'Connor	37,442	49.3	+4.7
Liberal hold		Swing	−4.7	

=== Burke ===
This section is an excerpt from Electoral results for the Division of Burke (1969–2004) § 1983

1983 Australian federal election: Burke
Party	Candidate	Votes	%	±%
Labor	Andrew Theophanous	46,171	60.9	+6.8
Liberal	Bernie Finn	24,294	32.0	−6.2
Democrats	George Hunter	4,611	6.1	−1.6
Socialist Workers	Evelyn Robson	788	1.0	+1.0
Total formal votes		75,864	97.2	
Informal votes		2,163	2.8	
Turnout		78,027	95.9	
Two-party-preferred result
Labor	Andrew Theophanous		65.5	+6.7
Liberal	Bernie Finn		34.5	−6.7
Labor hold		Swing	+6.7	

=== Casey ===
This section is an excerpt from Electoral results for the Division of Casey § 1983

1983 Australian federal election: Casey
Party	Candidate	Votes	%	±%
Labor	Peter Steedman	34,810	46.0	+6.8
Liberal	Peter Falconer	33,335	44.1	−1.3
Democrats	Michael Nardella	5,646	7.5	−2.8
Christian	Martin Hetherich	931	1.2	+1.2
Democratic Labor	John Garratt	887	1.2	+1.2
Total formal votes		75,609	98.3	
Informal votes		1,390	1.7	
Turnout		76,918	96.2	
Two-party-preferred result
Labor	Peter Steedman	38,312	50.7	+2.6
Liberal	Peter Falconer	37,297	49.3	−2.6
Labor gain from Liberal		Swing	+2.6	

=== Chisholm ===
This section is an excerpt from Electoral results for the Division of Chisholm § 1983

1983 Australian federal election: Chisholm
Party	Candidate	Votes	%	±%
Labor	Helen Mayer	33,253	48.2	+7.1
Liberal	Graham Harris	29,052	42.1	−5.0
Democrats	Alan Swindon	4,444	6.5	−4.3
Democratic Labor	Kevin Cooper	2,196	3.2	+3.2
Total formal votes		68,945	98.4	
Informal votes		1,128	1.6	
Turnout		70,073	96.3	
Two-party-preferred result
Labor	Helen Mayer	36,019	52.2	+4.4
Liberal	Graham Harris	32,926	47.8	−4.4
Labor gain from Liberal		Swing	+4.4	

=== Corangamite ===
This section is an excerpt from Electoral results for the Division of Corangamite § 1983

1983 Australian federal election: Corangamite
Party	Candidate	Votes	%	±%
Liberal	Tony Street	40,694	58.2	+1.6
Labor	Gavan O'Connor	29,231	41.8	+10.5
Total formal votes		69,925	98.3	
Informal votes		1,190	1.7	
Turnout		71,115	97.2	
Liberal hold		Swing	−4.6	

=== Corio ===
This section is an excerpt from Electoral results for the Division of Corio § 1983

1983 Australian federal election: Corio
Party	Candidate	Votes	%	±%
Labor	Gordon Scholes	43,016	60.1	+3.5
Liberal	Kent Henderson	25,075	35.0	−0.2
Democrats	Guenter Sahr	3,452	4.8	−0.1
Total formal votes		71,543	98.0	
Informal votes		1,429	2.0	
Turnout		72,972	96.0	
Two-party-preferred result
Labor	Gordon Scholes		63.0	+3.2
Liberal	Kent Henderson		37.0	−3.2
Labor hold		Swing	+3.2	

=== Deakin ===
This section is an excerpt from Electoral results for the Division of Deakin § 1983

1983 Australian federal election: Deakin
Party	Candidate	Votes	%	±%
Labor	John Saunderson	38,225	47.7	+6.3
Liberal	Alan Jarman	33,225	41.5	−2.2
Democrats	Jeffrey McAlpine	5,324	6.7	−5.2
Democratic Labor	Peter Ferwerda	2,949	3.7	+0.7
Independent	Wilfrid Thiele	333	0.4	+0.4
Total formal votes		81,615	96.4	
Informal votes		1,559	1.9	
Turnout		81,615	96.4	
Two-party-preferred result
Labor	John Saunderson	41,727	52.1	+4.4
Liberal	Alan Jarman	38,329	47.9	−4.4
Labor gain from Liberal		Swing	+4.4	

=== Diamond Valley ===
This section is an excerpt from Electoral results for the Division of Diamond Valley § 1983

1983 Australian federal election: Diamond Valley
Party	Candidate	Votes	%	±%
Labor	Peter Staples	36,726	46.4	+6.0
Liberal	Neil Brown	36,006	45.5	−3.1
Democrats	Lynden Kenyon	5,162	6.5	−4.5
Democratic Labor	Anne-Marie Petrucco	1,229	1.6	+1.6
Total formal votes		79,123	98.1	
Informal votes		1,492	1.9	
Turnout		80,615	97.6	
Two-party-preferred result
Labor	Peter Staples	39,907	50.4	+4.1
Liberal	Neil Brown	39,216	49.6	−4.1
Labor gain from Liberal		Swing	+4.1	

=== Flinders ===
This section is an excerpt from Electoral results for the Division of Flinders § 1983

1983 Australian federal election: Flinders
Party	Candidate	Votes	%	±%
Labor	Bob Chynoweth	38,134	47.2	+8.0
Liberal	Peter Reith	35,847	44.4	−5.9
Democrats	Harold Fraser	4,861	6.0	−4.5
Democratic Labor	Kenneth Payne	1,977	2.4	+2.4
Total formal votes		80,819	98.5	
Informal votes		1,208	1.5	
Turnout		82,027	95.7	
Two-party-preferred result
Labor	Bob Chynoweth	41,206	51.0	+5.6
Liberal	Peter Reith	39,613	49.0	−5.6
Labor gain from Liberal		Swing	+5.6	

=== Gellibrand ===
This section is an excerpt from Electoral results for the Division of Gellibrand § 1983

1983 Australian federal election: Gellibrand
Party	Candidate	Votes	%	±%
Labor	Ralph Willis	47,412	70.4	+4.9
Liberal	Peter Goudge	14,120	21.0	−1.2
Socialist Workers	James Doughney	2,842	4.2	+0.8
Democrats	Barry McLeod	2,695	4.0	−5.0
Australian National Party	Augustus Titter	304	0.5	+0.5
Total formal votes		67,373	96.2	
Informal votes		2,678	3.8	
Turnout		70,051	95.4	
Two-party-preferred result
Labor	Ralph Willis		75.9	+2.5
Liberal	Peter Goudge		24.1	−2.5
Labor hold		Swing	+2.5	

=== Gippsland ===
This section is an excerpt from Electoral results for the Division of Gippsland § 1983

1983 Australian federal election: Gippsland
Party	Candidate	Votes	%	±%
Labor	Anthony Petersen	24,029	35.4	+5.2
National	Peter McGauran	21,360	31.5	−25.2
Liberal	Philip Davis	16,127	23.8	+23.8
Democrats	Pierre Forcier	2,930	4.3	−6.2
Independent	Pearce Buckley	2,059	3.0	+3.0
Democratic Labor	Stewart Taig	659	1.0	+1.0
Independent	Bruce Ingle	652	1.0	+1.0
Total formal votes		67,816	96.8	
Informal votes		2,257	3.2	
Turnout		70,073	95.4	
Two-party-preferred result
National	Peter McGauran	40,465	59.7	−2.2
Labor	Anthony Petersen	27,351	40.3	+2.2
National hold		Swing	−2.2	

=== Henty ===
This section is an excerpt from Electoral results for the Division of Henty § 1983

1983 Australian federal election: Henty
Party	Candidate	Votes	%	±%
Labor	Joan Child	36,259	54.7	+5.6
Liberal	Craig Baxter	25,709	38.8	−3.5
Democrats	Harry Eichler	2,845	4.3	−1.7
Democratic Labor	Paul Carroll	1,442	2.2	−0.4
Total formal votes		66,255	98.3	
Informal votes		1,169	1.7	
Turnout		67,424	95.5	
Two-party-preferred result
Labor	Joan Child		57.5	+4.7
Liberal	Craig Baxter		42.5	−4.7
Labor hold		Swing	+4.7	

=== Higgins ===
This section is an excerpt from Electoral results for the Division of Higgins § 1983

1983 Australian federal election: Higgins
Party	Candidate	Votes	%	±%
Liberal	Roger Shipton	35,189	55.2	−1.8
Labor	Jennifer Bundy	24,184	37.9	+3.5
Democrats	Antony Siddons	3,880	6.1	−0.9
Imperial British	Maureen Holmes	500	0.8	−0.2
Total formal votes		63,753	98.4	
Informal votes		1,024	1.6	
Turnout		64,777	94.8	
Two-party-preferred result
Liberal	Roger Shipton		58.0	−2.7
Labor	Jennifer Bundy		42.0	+2.7
Liberal hold		Swing	−2.7	

=== Holt ===
This section is an excerpt from Electoral results for the Division of Holt § 1983

1983 Australian federal election: Holt
Party	Candidate	Votes	%	±%
Labor	Michael Duffy	48,648	58.5	+6.4
Liberal	Joseph Moldrich	28,845	34.7	−3.7
Democrats	Jean Yule	5,639	6.8	−0.9
Total formal votes		83,132	97.6	
Informal votes		2,022	2.4	
Turnout		85,154	96.1	
Two-party-preferred result
Labor	Michael Duffy		62.6	+5.7
Liberal	Joseph Moldrich		37.4	−5.7
Labor hold		Swing	+5.7	

=== Hotham ===
This section is an excerpt from Electoral results for the Division of Hotham § 1983

1983 Australian federal election: Hotham
Party	Candidate	Votes	%	±%
Labor	Lewis Kent	43,083	56.4	+7.9
Liberal	Peter Bolitho	28,656	37.5	−1.2
Democrats	Erwin Frenkel	4,683	6.1	−5.1
Total formal votes		76,422	97.6	
Informal votes		1,850	2.4	
Turnout		78,272	96.5	
Two-party-preferred result
Labor	Lewis Kent		60.1	+6.1
Liberal	Peter Bolitho		39.9	−6.1
Labor hold		Swing	+6.1	

=== Indi ===
This section is an excerpt from Electoral results for the Division of Indi § 1983

1983 Australian federal election: Indi
Party	Candidate	Votes	%	±%
Liberal	Ewen Cameron	27,935	41.3	−0.5
Labor	Carole Marple	24,374	36.1	+3.0
National	Kevin Sanderson	12,892	19.1	−0.4
Democrats	Geoffrey le Couteur	2,361	3.5	−0.7
Total formal votes		67,562	98.4	
Informal votes		1,066	1.6	
Turnout		68,628	96.5	
Two-party-preferred result
Liberal	Ewen Cameron	40,975	60.6	−1.8
Labor	Carole Marple	26,587	39.4	+1.8
Liberal hold		Swing	−1.8	

=== Isaacs ===
This section is an excerpt from Electoral results for the Division of Isaacs § 1983

1983 Australian federal election: Isaacs
Party	Candidate	Votes	%	±%
Labor	David Charles	38,630	55.0	+9.9
Liberal	Ann Dunkley	26,964	38.4	+0.4
Democrats	Terence Gough	4,689	6.7	−7.4
Total formal votes		70,283	98.4	
Informal votes		1,169	1.6	
Turnout		71,452	96.1	
Two-party-preferred result
Labor	David Charles		59.0	+7.2
Liberal	Ann Dunkley		41.0	−7.2
Labor hold		Swing	+7.2	

=== Kooyong ===
This section is an excerpt from Electoral results for the Division of Kooyong § 1983

1983 Australian federal election: Kooyong
Party	Candidate	Votes	%	±%
Liberal	Andrew Peacock	36,297	56.3	−1.3
Labor	Avis Meddings	23,081	35.8	+1.9
Democrats	Keith Bruckner	4,635	7.2	−1.3
Imperial British	David Greagg	434	0.7	+0.7
Total formal votes		64,447	98.2	
Informal votes		1,154	1.8	
Turnout		65,601	94.6	
Two-party-preferred result
Liberal	Andrew Peacock		59.1	−2.0
Labor	Avis Meddings		40.9	+2.0
Liberal hold		Swing	−2.0	

=== La Trobe ===
This section is an excerpt from Electoral results for the Division of La Trobe § 1983

1983 Australian federal election: La Trobe
Party	Candidate	Votes	%	±%
Labor	Peter Milton	40,493	52.8	+7.6
Liberal	Peter Nugent	26,045	34.0	−6.7
Democrats	Milton Blake	8,010	10.5	+0.1
Christian	Cornelis Hellema	2,085	2.7	+2.7
Total formal votes		76,633	98.2	
Informal votes		1,439	1.8	
Turnout		78,072	96.2	
Two-party-preferred result
Labor	Peter Milton		60.9	+8.6
Liberal	Peter Nugent		39.1	−8.6
Labor hold		Swing	+8.6	

=== Lalor ===
This section is an excerpt from Electoral results for the Division of Lalor § 1983

1983 Australian federal election: Lalor
Party	Candidate	Votes	%	±%
Labor	Barry Jones	55,640	68.0	−0.3
Liberal	John Fahey	21,442	26.2	+0.6
Democrats	Ivan Pollock	4,040	4.9	−1.1
Socialist Workers	Helen Said	719	0.9	+0.9
Total formal votes		81,841	97.6	
Informal votes		2,914	3.4	
Turnout		84,755	96.0	
Two-party-preferred result
Labor	Barry Jones		71.8	−0.1
Liberal	John Fahey		28.2	+0.1
Labor hold		Swing	−0.1	

=== Mallee ===
This section is an excerpt from Electoral results for the Division of Mallee § 1983

1983 Australian federal election: Mallee
Party	Candidate	Votes	%	±%
National	Peter Fisher	40,063	62.1	+14.9
Labor	Graeme Jarry	16,193	25.1	+1.2
Liberal	Ross Owen	6,139	9.5	−11.9
Democrats	Colin Kavanagh	2,130	3.3	−1.1
Total formal votes		64,525	98.1	
Informal votes		1,269	1.9	
Turnout		65,794	95.8	
Two-party-preferred result
National	Peter Fisher		72.0	+1.2
Labor	Graeme Jarry		28.0	−1.2
National hold		Swing	+1.2	

=== Maribyrnong ===
This section is an excerpt from Electoral results for the Division of Maribyrnong § 1983

1983 Australian federal election: Maribyrnong
Party	Candidate	Votes	%	±%
Labor	Alan Griffiths	41,924	56.6	+2.0
Liberal	Geoffrey Ireland	24,400	33.0	−2.1
Democrats	Henrik Jersic	4,452	6.0	−4.2
Socialist Workers	Peter Beharell	2,420	3.3	+3.3
Australia	Richard Wright	844	1.1	+1.1
Total formal votes		74,040	97.4	
Informal votes		2,001	2.6	
Turnout		76,041	96.7	
Two-party-preferred result
Labor	Alan Griffiths		63.8	+3.1
Liberal	Geoffrey Ireland		36.2	−3.1
Labor hold		Swing	+3.1	

=== McMillan ===
This section is an excerpt from Electoral results for the Division of McMillan § 1983

1983 Australian federal election: McMillan
Party	Candidate	Votes	%	±%
Labor	Barry Cunningham	34,099	48.3	+5.4
Liberal	Greg Ross	27,831	39.5	−4.7
Democrats	Gloria Auchterlonie	4,062	5.8	−1.5
National	Stewart Robertson	3,317	4.7	+4.7
Democratic Labor	John Sellens	1,219	1.7	−3.3
Total formal votes		70,528	97.9	
Informal votes		1,548	2.1	
Turnout		72,076	96.2	
Two-party-preferred result
Labor	Barry Cunningham	37,433	53.1	+1.7
Liberal	Greg Ross	33,095	46.9	−1.7
Labor hold		Swing	+1.7	

=== Melbourne ===
This section is an excerpt from Electoral results for the Division of Melbourne § 1983

1983 Australian federal election: Melbourne
Party	Candidate	Votes	%	±%
Labor	Gerry Hand	38,694	63.7	+3.0
Liberal	Robert Fallshaw	14,370	23.6	−4.5
Democrats	Chris Carter	6,271	10.3	+3.2
Socialist Workers	James McIlroy	750	1.2	+1.2
Imperial British	James Ferrari	678	1.1	−0.4
Total formal votes		60,763	96.7	
Informal votes		2,074	3.3	
Turnout		62,837	92.3	
Two-party-preferred result
Labor	Gerry Hand		70.2	+3.1
Liberal	Robert Fallshaw		29.8	−3.1
Labor hold		Swing	+3.1	

=== Melbourne Ports ===
This section is an excerpt from Electoral results for the Division of Melbourne Ports § 1983

1983 Australian federal election: Melbourne Ports
Party	Candidate	Votes	%	±%
Labor	Clyde Holding	36,444	59.7	+2.7
Liberal	Ronald Flood	20,488	33.5	−0.4
Democrats	John Sutcliffe	3,556	5.8	−1.5
Socialist Workers	Brett Trenery	595	1.0	+1.0
Total formal votes		61,083	97.3	
Informal votes		1,688	2.7	
Turnout		62,751	91.6	
Two-party-preferred result
Labor	Clyde Holding		64.1	+1.8
Liberal	Ronald Flood		35.9	−1.8
Labor hold		Swing	+1.8	

=== Murray ===
This section is an excerpt from Electoral results for the Division of Murray § 1983

1983 Australian federal election: Murray
Party	Candidate	Votes	%	±%
National	Bruce Lloyd	36,433	53.3	+7.1
Labor	Mark Anderson	16,684	24.4	+0.5
Liberal	Anne Adams	11,727	17.2	−5.1
Democrats	John Weir	2,640	3.9	−2.0
Independent	Diane Teasdale	835	1.2	−0.6
Total formal votes		68,319	97.8	
Informal votes		1,506	2.2	
Turnout		69,825	96.8	
Two-party-preferred result
National	Bruce Lloyd		71.3	+3.8
Labor	Mark Anderson		28.7	−3.8
National hold		Swing	+3.8	

=== Scullin ===
This section is an excerpt from Electoral results for the Division of Scullin § 1983

1983 Australian federal election: Scullin
Party	Candidate	Votes	%	±%
Labor	Harry Jenkins	51,312	66.4	−0.7
Liberal	Katheryne Savage	19,519	25.3	−1.7
Democrats	Kenneth Peak	3,528	4.6	−1.2
Socialist Workers	Joan Barker	2,886	3.7	+3.7
Total formal votes		77,245	97.0	
Informal votes		2,352	3.0	
Turnout		79,597	96.3	
Two-party-preferred result
Labor	Harry Jenkins		72.6	+2.0
Liberal	Katheryne Savage		27.4	−2.0
Labor hold		Swing	+2.0	

=== Wannon ===
This section is an excerpt from Electoral results for the Division of Wannon § 1983

1983 Australian federal election: Wannon
Party	Candidate	Votes	%	±%
Liberal	Malcolm Fraser	37,792	57.6	−0.8
Labor	Nancy Genardini	24,359	37.2	+2.1
Democrats	Harold Jeffrey	3,416	5.2	+1.1
Total formal votes		65,567	98.7	
Informal votes		865	1.3	
Turnout		66,432	97.0	
Two-party-preferred result
Liberal	Malcolm Fraser		59.7	−1.5
Labor	Nancy Genardini		40.3	+1.5
Liberal hold		Swing	−1.5	

=== Wills ===
This section is an excerpt from Electoral results for the Division of Wills § 1983

1983 Australian federal election: Wills
Party	Candidate	Votes	%	±%
Labor	Bob Hawke	45,571	67.6	+2.5
Liberal	Mark Hoysted	14,773	21.9	−4.5
Democrats	John Hallam	4,225	6.3	+2.6
Socialist Labour	Martin Mantell	1,287	1.9	+1.2
Democratic Labor	Michael Verberne	1,145	1.7	−0.2
Socialist Workers	Solomon Salby	206	0.3	−0.7
Imperial British	Cecil G. Murgatroyd	174	0.3	+0.3
Total formal votes		67,381	96.2	
Informal votes		2,660	3.8	
Turnout		70,041	95.3	
Two-party-preferred result
Labor	Bob Hawke		74.1	+4.2
Liberal	Mark Hoysted		25.9	−4.2
Labor hold		Swing	+4.2	

== Queensland ==
1983 Australian federal election (Queensland)
- 5 March 1983

All 19 Queensland seats in the House of Representatives 10 seats needed for a majority
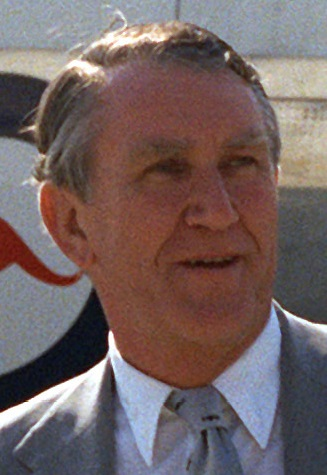

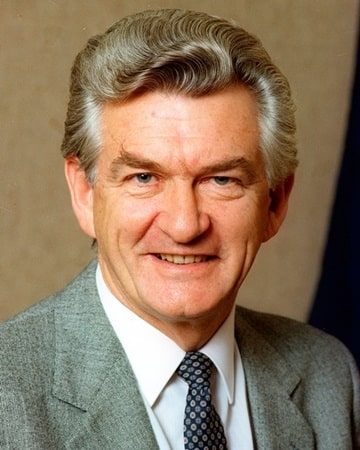
	First party	Second party
Leader	Malcolm Fraser	Bob Hawke
Party	Coalition	Labor
Seats before	14	5
Seats won	9	10
Seat change	▼5	▲5
Primary vote	648,177	621,146
Percentage	48.10%	46.10%
Swing	▼1.10pp	▲3.30pp
TPP	50.54%	49.45%
TPP swing	▼2.56pp	▲2.56pp

=== Bowman ===
This section is an excerpt from Electoral results for the Division of Bowman § 1983

1983 Australian federal election: Bowman
Party	Candidate	Votes	%	±%
Labor	Len Keogh	37,666	49.7	+3.8
Liberal	David Jull	30,522	40.3	−8.5
National	Craig Brown	4,579	6.0	+6.0
Democrats	Ronald Heindorff	3,040	4.0	−1.3
Total formal votes		75,807	98.8	
Informal votes		945	1.2	
Turnout		76,752	93.3	
Two-party-preferred result
Labor	Len Keogh		52.2	+3.4
Liberal	David Jull		47.8	−3.4
Labor gain from Liberal		Swing	+3.4	

=== Brisbane ===
This section is an excerpt from Electoral results for the Division of Brisbane § 1983

1983 Australian federal election: Brisbane
Party	Candidate	Votes	%	±%
Labor	Manfred Cross	31,596	50.4	+2.3
Liberal	Richard Magnus	20,566	32.8	−11.9
National	Bradley Garrett	5,447	8.7	+8.7
Democrats	Lance Winter	3,462	5.5	−0.5
Socialist Workers	Susanne Bolton	1,565	2.5	+2.5
Total formal votes		62,636	98.6	
Informal votes		864	1.4	
Turnout		63,500	91.9	
Two-party-preferred result
Labor	Manfred Cross		56.9	+5.1
Liberal	Richard Magnus		43.1	−5.1
Labor hold		Swing	+5.1	

=== Capricornia ===
This section is an excerpt from Electoral results for the Division of Capricornia § 1983

1983 Australian federal election: Capricornia
Party	Candidate	Votes	%	±%
Labor	Doug Everingham	36,662	54.4	+3.5
National	Robert Simpson	11,480	17.0	−7.8
Liberal	Alan Agnew	11,465	17.0	+4.9
National	Helen Reeves	5,620	8.3	+8.3
Democrats	Gregory Read	1,881	2.8	−0.6
Socialist	David Ryan	226	0.3	+0.3
Total formal votes		67,334	98.9	
Informal votes		754	1.1	
Turnout		68,088	94.0	
Two-party-preferred result
Labor	Doug Everingham		59.9	+5.6
National	Robert Simpson		40.1	−5.6
Labor hold		Swing	+5.6	

=== Darling Downs ===
This section is an excerpt from Electoral results for the Division of Darling Downs § 1983

1983 Australian federal election: Darling Downs
Party	Candidate	Votes	%	±%
National	Tom McVeigh	42,627	61.7	−1.6
Labor	Ronald Cullin	22,524	32.6	+2.7
Democrats	David Groves	3,960	5.7	+0.2
Total formal votes		69,111	99.0	
Informal votes		715	1.0	
Turnout		69,826	93.9	
Two-party-preferred result
National	Tom McVeigh		64.0	−1.8
Labor	Ronald Cullin		36.0	+1.8
National hold		Swing	−1.8	

=== Dawson ===
This section is an excerpt from Electoral results for the Division of Dawson § 1983

1983 Australian federal election: Dawson
Party	Candidate	Votes	%	±%
National	Ray Braithwaite	35,686	50.1	+0.0
Labor	Barbara Hill	34,229	48.1	+2.9
Independent	Raymond Jensen	426	0.6	+0.6
Independent	Eric Geissmann	423	0.6	+0.6
Progress	Kelly Crombie	420	0.6	+0.1
Total formal votes		71,184	98.9	
Informal votes		815	1.1	
Turnout		71,999	92.6	
Two-party-preferred result
National	Ray Braithwaite		51.2	−6.7
Labor	Barbara Hill		48.8	+6.7
National hold		Swing	−6.7	

=== Fadden ===
This section is an excerpt from Electoral results for the Division of Fadden § 1983

1983 Australian federal election: Fadden
Party	Candidate	Votes	%	±%
Labor	David Beddall	44,412	48.3	+4.7
Liberal	Don Cameron	35,692	38.8	−9.2
National	Howard Edmunds	7,251	7.9	+7.9
Democrats	Murray Hallam	3,806	4.1	−3.4
Socialist	Raymond Ferguson	505	0.5	+0.5
Progress	Dallas Graham	276	0.3	−0.5
Total formal votes		91,942	98.4	
Informal votes		1,476	1.6	
Turnout		93,418	92.6	
Two-party-preferred result
Labor	David Beddall		51.7	+3.1
Liberal	Don Cameron		48.3	−3.1
Labor gain from Liberal		Swing	+3.1	

=== Fisher ===
This section is an excerpt from Electoral results for the Division of Fisher § 1983

1983 Australian federal election: Fisher
Party	Candidate	Votes	%	±%
National	Evan Adermann	36,848	39.9	−13.4
Labor	Sol Theo	35,220	38.2	+3.4
Liberal	Dennis Caswell	13,414	14.5	+14.5
Democrats	Garry Somerville	6,764	7.3	−0.8
Total formal votes		92,246	99.0	
Informal votes		960	1.0	
Turnout		93,206	93.2	
Two-party-preferred result
National	Evan Adermann	52,691	57.1	−1.8
Labor	Sol Theo	39,555	42.9	+1.8
National hold		Swing	−1.8	

=== Griffith ===
This section is an excerpt from Electoral results for the Division of Griffith § 1983

1983 Australian federal election: Griffith
Party	Candidate	Votes	%	±%
Labor	Ben Humphreys	32,597	57.9	+2.1
Liberal	Graham Young	18,545	32.9	+5.2
Democrats	Carole Ames	3,777	6.7	+2.4
Socialist Labour	Michael Fulton	750	1.3	+1.3
Socialist Workers	Julie Walkington	620	1.1	−2.9
Total formal votes		56,289	97.7	
Informal votes		1,301	2.3	
Turnout		57,590	89.2	
Two-party-preferred result
Labor	Ben Humphreys		64.5	+1.6
Liberal	Graham Young		35.5	−1.6
Labor hold		Swing	+1.6	

=== Herbert ===
This section is an excerpt from Electoral results for the Division of Herbert § 1983

1983 Australian federal election: Herbert
Party	Candidate	Votes	%	±%
Labor	Ted Lindsay	35,368	50.2	+3.7
Liberal	Gordon Dean	23,875	33.9	−13.9
National	John Aubrey	9,562	13.6	+13.6
Democrats	John Lamb	1,597	2.3	−3.3
Total formal votes		70,402	99.1	
Informal votes		659	0.9	
Turnout		71,061	90.7	
Two-party-preferred result
Labor	Ted Lindsay		52.8	+3.7
Liberal	Gordon Dean		47.2	−3.7
Labor gain from Liberal		Swing	+3.7	

=== Kennedy ===
This section is an excerpt from Electoral results for the Division of Kennedy § 1983

1983 Australian federal election: Kennedy
Party	Candidate	Votes	%	±%
National	Bob Katter, Sr.	32,871	56.6	−3.6
Labor	Brigid Walsh	22,407	38.6	+2.6
Democrats	George Hannaford	2,757	4.8	+4.8
Total formal votes		58,035	98.7	
Informal votes		748	1.3	
Turnout		58,783	90.8	
Two-party-preferred result
National	Bob Katter, Sr.		59.1	−3.6
Labor	Brigid Walsh		40.9	+3.6
National hold		Swing	−3.6	

=== Leichhardt ===
This section is an excerpt from Electoral results for the Division of Leichhardt § 1983

1983 Australian federal election: Leichhardt
Party	Candidate	Votes	%	±%
Labor	John Gayler	35,071	52.1	+5.8
National	David Thomson	32,285	47.9	−1.0
Total formal votes		67,356	98.2	
Informal votes		1,251	1.8	
Turnout		68,607	91.5	
Labor gain from National		Swing	+3.2	

=== Lilley ===
This section is an excerpt from Electoral results for the Division of Lilley § 1983

1983 Australian federal election: Lilley
Party	Candidate	Votes	%	±%
Labor	Elaine Darling	35,350	57.2	+9.2
Liberal	Jim Anderson	24,249	39.3	−7.9
Democrats	Gael Paul	1,779	2.9	−1.9
Independent	Anthony Catip	375	0.6	+0.6
Total formal votes		61,753	98.9	
Informal votes		687	1.1	
Turnout		62,440	93.9	
Two-party-preferred result
Labor	Elaine Darling		59.2	+8.4
Liberal	Jim Anderson		40.8	−8.4
Labor hold		Swing	+8.4	

=== Maranoa ===
This section is an excerpt from Electoral results for the Division of Maranoa § 1983

1983 Australian federal election: Maranoa
Party	Candidate	Votes	%	±%
National	Ian Cameron	39,591	62.9	+5.6
Labor	Warren Keats	19,057	30.3	+0.8
Democrats	Austin Brannigan	4,300	6.8	+2.9
Total formal votes		62,948	98.9	
Informal votes		723	1.1	
Turnout		63,671	93.7	
Two-party-preferred result
National	Ian Cameron		66.2	−0.9
Labor	Warren Keats		33.8	+0.9
National hold		Swing	−0.9	

=== McPherson ===
This section is an excerpt from Electoral results for the Division of McPherson § 1983

1983 Australian federal election: McPherson
Party	Candidate	Votes	%	±%
Liberal	Peter White	31,118	35.9	−7.4
Labor	Darryl McArthur	29,265	33.8	+3.0
National	Trevor Watt	20,328	23.5	+23.5
Democrats	Kenneth Peterson	4,254	4.9	−0.1
Humanitarian	Peter Courtney	1,687	1.9	+1.9
Total formal votes		86,652	98.5	
Informal votes		1,277	1.5	
Turnout		87,929	92.0	
Two-party-preferred result
Liberal	Peter White	52,282	60.3	+6.7
Labor	Darryl McArthur	34,370	39.7	−6.7
Liberal hold		Swing	+6.7	

=== Moreton ===
This section is an excerpt from Electoral results for the Division of Moreton § 1983

1983 Australian federal election: Moreton
Party	Candidate	Votes	%	±%
Liberal	Sir James Killen	29,638	46.7	−4.0
Labor	Barbara Robson	28,854	45.5	+3.2
Democrats	Leonard Fitzgerald	4,230	6.7	+2.0
Socialist Workers	Helen Jones	712	1.1	+1.1
Total formal votes		63,434	98.5	
Informal votes		987	1.5	
Turnout		64,421	92.8	
Two-party-preferred result
Liberal	Sir James Killen	32,728	51.6	−3.0
Labor	Barbara Robson	30,706	48.4	+3.0
Liberal hold		Swing	−3.0	

=== Oxley ===
This section is an excerpt from Electoral results for the Division of Oxley § 1983

1983 Australian federal election: Oxley
Party	Candidate	Votes	%	±%
Labor	Bill Hayden	49,837	66.9	+2.8
Liberal	Les Woodforth	20,346	27.3	−1.8
Democrats	Wayne Martin	3,699	5.0	+0.9
Socialist Workers	Juanita Keig	668	0.9	+0.9
Total formal votes		74,550	98.7	
Informal votes		957	1.3	
Turnout		75,507	93.5	
Two-party-preferred result
Labor	Bill Hayden		70.7	+1.9
Liberal	Les Woodforth		29.3	−1.9
Labor hold		Swing	+1.9	

=== Petrie ===
This section is an excerpt from Electoral results for the Division of Petrie § 1983

1983 Australian federal election: Petrie
Party	Candidate	Votes	%	±%
Labor	Deane Wells	33,283	47.0	+4.3
Liberal	John Hodges	31,227	44.1	−3.9
Democrats	Ray Hollis	4,506	6.4	−0.4
Independent	Christopher Caldwell	1,453	2.0	+2.0
Progress	Phillip Grimison	411	0.6	−2.0
Total formal votes		70,880	98.6	
Informal votes		1,003	1.4	
Turnout		71,883	93.4	
Two-party-preferred result
Labor	Deane Wells	35,800	50.5	+3.9
Liberal	John Hodges	35,080	49.5	−3.9
Labor gain from Liberal		Swing	+3.9	

=== Ryan ===
This section is an excerpt from Electoral results for the Division of Ryan § 1983

1983 Australian federal election: Ryan
Party	Candidate	Votes	%	±%
Liberal	John Moore	37,873	53.1	−2.0
Labor	Michael Foley	25,386	35.6	+1.6
Democrats	John Elfick	5,975	8.4	−0.6
Independent	Anthony Crooks	1,135	1.6	+1.6
Independent	Patrick Cusack	964	1.4	+1.4
Total formal votes		71,333	98.2	
Informal votes		862	1.2	
Turnout		72,195	92.7	
Two-party-preferred result
Liberal	John Moore		57.5	−2.9
Labor	Michael Foley		42.5	+2.9
Liberal hold		Swing	−2.9	

=== Wide Bay ===
This section is an excerpt from Electoral results for the Division of Wide Bay § 1983

1983 Australian federal election: Wide Bay
Party	Candidate	Votes	%	±%
National	Clarrie Millar	35,472	48.9	−1.5
Labor	James Finemore	32,362	44.6	+4.2
Democrats	Mervyn Worth	2,850	3.9	−2.8
Progress	Raymond Bird	1,813	2.5	+0.0
Total formal votes		72,497	98.9	
Informal votes		806	1.1	
Turnout		73,303	94.1	
Two-party-preferred result
National	Clarrie Millar	37,602	51.9	−2.5
Labor	James Finemore	34,895	48.1	+2.5
National hold		Swing	−2.5	

== South Australia ==
1983 Australian federal election (South Australia)
- 5 March 1983

All 11 SA seats in the House of Representatives 6 seats needed for a majority
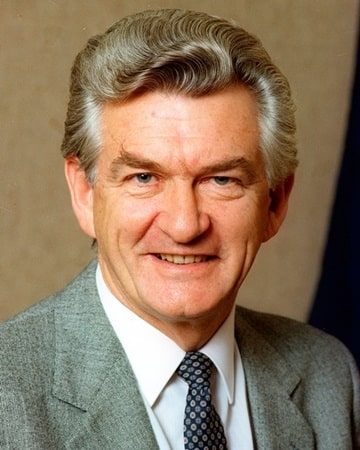

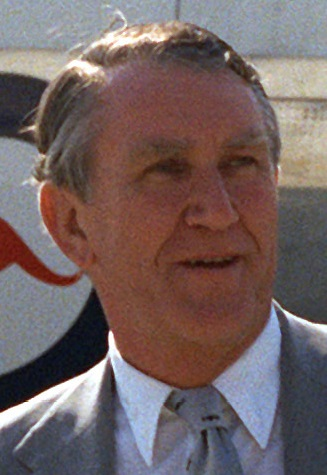
	First party	Second party
Leader	Bob Hawke	Malcolm Fraser
Party	Labor	Coalition
Seats before	6	5
Seats won	7	4
Seat change	▲1	▼1
Primary vote	393,971	351,583
Percentage	48.40%	43.20%
Swing	▲3.90pp	▼2.70pp
TPP	52.30%	47.70%
TPP swing	▲2.70pp	▼2.70pp

=== Adelaide ===
This section is an excerpt from Electoral results for the Division of Adelaide § 1983

1983 Australian federal election: Adelaide
Party	Candidate	Votes	%	±%
Labor	Chris Hurford	39,134	55.8	+3.7
Liberal	Barry James	24,156	34.4	−1.8
Democrats	Eileen Farmer	4,604	6.6	−5.1
Independent	John Buik	1,894	2.7	+2.7
Socialist Workers	Paul Petit	385	0.5	+0.5
Total formal votes		70,173	96.8	
Informal votes		2,314	3.2	
Turnout		72,487	93.5	
Two-party-preferred result
Labor	Chris Hurford		62.6	+4.1
Liberal	Barry James		37.4	−4.1
Labor hold		Swing	+4.1	

=== Barker ===
This section is an excerpt from Electoral results for the Division of Barker § 1983

1983 Australian federal election: Barker
Party	Candidate	Votes	%	±%
Liberal	James Porter	42,333	57.3	−0.2
Labor	Valerie Young	23,906	32.4	+3.5
Democrats	Meg Lees	3,974	5.4	−0.2
National	Anthony Beck	3,650	4.9	−3.2
Total formal votes		73,863	97.7	
Informal votes		1,717	2.3	
Turnout		75,580	96.0	
Two-party-preferred result
Liberal	James Porter		63.8	−2.3
Labor	Valerie Young		36.2	+2.3
Liberal hold		Swing	−2.3	

=== Bonython ===
This section is an excerpt from Electoral results for the Division of Bonython § 1983

1983 Australian federal election: Bonython
Party	Candidate	Votes	%	±%
Labor	Neal Blewett	48,097	60.5	+6.1
Liberal	Neville Joyce	24,391	30.7	−2.0
Democrats	John Longhurst	7,006	8.8	−2.3
Total formal votes		79,494	97.1	
Informal votes		2,340	2.9	
Turnout		81,834	94.1	
Two-party-preferred result
Labor	Neal Blewett		65.8	+3.4
Liberal	Neville Joyce		34.2	−3.4
Labor hold		Swing	+3.4	

=== Boothby ===
This section is an excerpt from Electoral results for the Division of Boothby § 1983

1983 Australian federal election: Boothby
Party	Candidate	Votes	%	±%
Liberal	Steele Hall	42,676	55.1	−1.1
Labor	Bruce Whyatt	26,343	34.0	+4.3
Democrats	John Coulter	8,424	10.9	−2.2
Total formal votes		77,443	98.3	
Informal votes		1,332	1.7	
Turnout		78,775	95.9	
Two-party-preferred result
Liberal	Steele Hall		60.1	−2.5
Labor	Bruce Whyatt		39.9	+2.5
Liberal hold		Swing	−2.5	

=== Grey ===
This section is an excerpt from Electoral results for the Division of Grey § 1983

1983 Australian federal election: Grey
Party	Candidate	Votes	%	±%
Labor	Lloyd O'Neil	35,276	51.0	+0.9
Liberal	Joy Baluch	24,114	34.9	−5.5
Democrats	Jack Babbage	3,981	5.8	+1.2
National	Anthony Haskett	3,454	5.0	+0.1
Independent	James Cronin	1,556	2.3	+2.3
Libertarian	Kerry Hawkes	732	1.1	+1.1
Total formal votes		69,113	96.9	
Informal votes		2,207	3.1	
Turnout		71,320	95.2	
Two-party-preferred result
Labor	Lloyd O'Neil		56.1	+2.7
Liberal	Joy Baluch		43.9	−2.7
Labor hold		Swing	+2.7	

=== Hawker ===
This section is an excerpt from Electoral results for the Division of Hawker § 1983

1983 Australian federal election: Hawker
Party	Candidate	Votes	%	±%
Labor	Ralph Jacobi	36,483	52.1	+2.7
Liberal	Bruce Harry	27,211	38.8	−3.5
Democrats	Graham Pamount	4,792	6.8	−1.5
Socialist Workers	John Garcia	1,568	2.2	+2.2
Total formal votes		70,054	97.5	
Informal votes		1,769	2.5	
Turnout		71,823	93.8	
Two-party-preferred result
Labor	Ralph Jacobi		57.3	+3.5
Liberal	Bruce Harry		42.7	−3.5
Labor hold		Swing	+3.5	

=== Hindmarsh ===
This section is an excerpt from Electoral results for the Division of Hindmarsh § 1983

1983 Australian federal election: Hindmarsh
Party	Candidate	Votes	%	±%
Labor	John Scott	39,496	53.7	+5.7
Liberal	Barry Lewis	26,280	35.8	−2.7
Democrats	Jim Mitchell	5,592	7.6	−1.6
Socialist Workers	Lotus Cavagnino	2,139	2.9	+0.7
Total formal votes		73,507	96.9	
Informal votes		2,352	3.1	
Turnout		75,859	95.2	
Two-party-preferred result
Labor	John Scott		60.0	+3.8
Liberal	Barry Lewis		40.0	−3.8
Labor hold		Swing	+3.8	

=== Kingston ===
This section is an excerpt from Electoral results for the Division of Kingston § 1983

1983 Australian federal election: Kingston
Party	Candidate	Votes	%	±%
Labor	Gordon Bilney	40,019	50.0	+5.3
Liberal	Grant Chapman	35,057	43.8	−2.5
Democrats	Robert Ralph	5,038	6.3	−2.7
Total formal votes		80,114	98.2	
Informal votes		1,488	1.8	
Turnout		81,602	95.5	
Two-party-preferred result
Labor	Gordon Bilney	42,568	53.1	+3.3
Liberal	Grant Chapman	37,546	46.9	−3.3
Labor gain from Liberal		Swing	+3.3	

=== Port Adelaide ===
This section is an excerpt from Electoral results for the Division of Port Adelaide § 1983

1983 Australian federal election: Port Adelaide
Party	Candidate	Votes	%	±%
Labor	Mick Young	48,865	68.0	+5.0
Liberal	Robin Rickards	16,567	23.0	−5.3
Socialist Workers	Robert Fisher	3,093	4.3	+4.3
Democrats	Benjamin Michael	2,484	3.5	−3.5
Communist	Donald Sutherland	888	1.2	−0.6
Total formal votes		71,897	95.9	
Informal votes		3,086	4.1	
Turnout		74,983	94.5	
Two-party-preferred result
Labor	Mick Young		74.2	+5.4
Liberal	Robin Rickards		25.8	−5.4
Labor hold		Swing	+5.4	

=== Sturt ===
This section is an excerpt from Electoral results for the Division of Sturt § 1983

1983 Australian federal election: Sturt
Party	Candidate	Votes	%	±%
Liberal	Ian Wilson	36,656	48.4	−2.5
Labor	Sergio Ubaldi	32,350	42.7	+2.2
Democrats	Alison Dolling	6,764	8.9	+0.8
Total formal votes		75,770	97.5	
Informal votes		1,959	2.5	
Turnout		77,729	96.0	
Two-party-preferred result
Liberal	Ian Wilson	39,379	52.0	−2.0
Labor	Sergio Ubaldi	36,391	48.0	+2.0
Liberal hold		Swing	−2.0	

=== Wakefield ===
This section is an excerpt from Electoral results for the Division of Wakefield § 1983

1983 Australian federal election: Wakefield
Party	Candidate	Votes	%	±%
Liberal	Neil Andrew	43,380	59.5	−0.3
Labor	Suzanne Owens	24,002	32.9	+3.9
Democrats	Donald Chisholm	3,851	5.3	−3.2
National	Roger Cavanagh	1,658	2.3	−0.4
Total formal votes		72,891	97.6	
Informal votes		1,816	2.4	
Turnout		74,707	95.5	
Two-party-preferred result
Liberal	Neil Andrew		63.7	−2.5
Labor	Suzanne Owens		36.3	+2.5
Liberal hold		Swing	−2.5	

== Western Australia ==
1983 Australian federal election (Western Australia)
- 5 March 1983

All 11 WA seats in the House of Representatives 6 seats needed for a majority
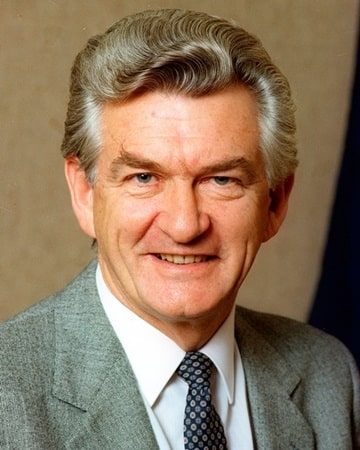

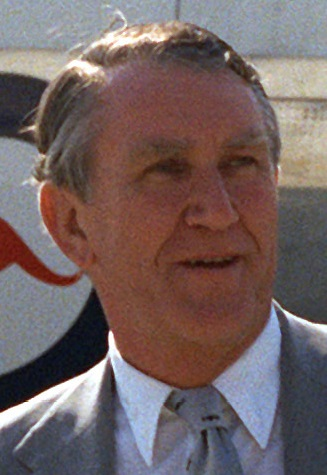
	First party	Second party
Leader	Bob Hawke	Malcolm Fraser
Party	Labor	Coalition
Seats before	3	8
Seats won	8	3
Seat change	▲5	▼5
Primary vote	378,545	314,162
Percentage	52.00%	43.106
Swing	▲10.00pp	▲5.00pp
TPP	55.00%	45.00%
TPP swing	▲8.30pp	▼8.30pp

=== Canning ===
This section is an excerpt from Electoral results for the Division of Canning § 1983

1983 Australian federal election: Canning
Party	Candidate	Votes	%	±%
Labor	Wendy Fatin	40,740	54.8	+12.8
Liberal	Mel Bungey	30,410	40.9	−6.4
Democrats	Jean Ritter	3,164	4.3	−5.1
Total formal votes		74,314	98.1	
Informal votes		1,414	1.9	
Turnout		75,728	94.1	
Two-party-preferred result
Labor	Wendy Fatin		57.4	+9.2
Liberal	Mel Bungey		42.6	−9.2
Labor gain from Liberal		Swing	+9.2	

=== Curtin ===
This section is an excerpt from Electoral results for the Division of Curtin § 1983

1983 Australian federal election: Curtin
Party	Candidate	Votes	%	±%
Liberal	Allan Rocher	30,404	51.7	−7.2
Labor	Clive Kittson	24,337	41.4	+8.6
Democrats	Marjorie McKercher	4,046	6.9	−1.4
Total formal votes		58,787	98.4	
Informal votes		949	1.6	
Turnout		59,736	93.5	
Two-party-preferred result
Liberal	Allan Rocher		54.5	−7.8
Labor	Clive Kittson		45.5	+7.8
Liberal hold		Swing	−7.8	

=== Forrest ===
This section is an excerpt from Electoral results for the Division of Forrest § 1983

1983 Australian federal election: Forrest
Party	Candidate	Votes	%	±%
Liberal	Peter Drummond	32,076	48.9	−2.4
Labor	David Churches	29,643	45.2	+9.2
Democrats	Donald Stewart	2,416	3.7	−3.3
Independent	Alfred Bussell	1,485	2.3	+2.3
Total formal votes		65,620	98.1	
Informal votes		1,281	1.9	
Turnout		66,901	94.7	
Two-party-preferred result
Liberal	Peter Drummond	33,735	51.4	−8.4
Labor	David Churches	31,885	48.6	+8.4
Liberal hold		Swing	−8.4	

=== Fremantle ===
This section is an excerpt from Electoral results for the Division of Fremantle § 1983

1983 Australian federal election: Fremantle
Party	Candidate	Votes	%	±%
Labor	John Dawkins	43,326	63.3	+5.2
Liberal	Max Adams	22,025	32.2	−2.1
Democrats	Colin Hull	1,733	2.5	−3.6
Socialist Labour	Timothy Peach	970	1.4	+1.4
Socialist Workers	Margo Condoleon	360	0.5	−1.0
Total formal votes		68,414	97.5	
Informal votes		1,779	2.5	
Turnout		70,193	93.8	
Two-party-preferred result
Labor	John Dawkins		66.5	+3.4
Liberal	Max Adams		33.5	−3.4
Labor hold		Swing	+3.4	

=== Kalgoorlie ===
This section is an excerpt from Electoral results for the Division of Kalgoorlie § 1983

1983 Australian federal election: Kalgoorlie
Party	Candidate	Votes	%	±%
Labor	Graeme Campbell	34,843	56.6	+11.4
Liberal	Douglas Krepp	23,069	37.5	−9.0
Democrats	Blair Nancarrow	1,856	3.0	−5.3
Independent	Joseph Boschetti	1,778	2.9	+2.9
Total formal votes		61,546	97.7	
Informal votes		1,459	2.3	
Turnout		63,005	86.0	
Two-party-preferred result
Labor	Graeme Campbell		59.5	+8.9
Liberal	Douglas Krepp		40.5	−8.9
Labor hold		Swing	+8.9	

=== Moore ===
This section is an excerpt from Electoral results for the Division of Moore § 1983

1983 Australian federal election: Moore
Party	Candidate	Votes	%	±%
Labor	Allen Blanchard	42,557	54.1	+11.2
Liberal	John Hyde	31,952	40.6	−6.4
Democrats	Alan Needham	4,120	5.2	−2.6
Total formal votes		78,629	98.4	
Informal votes		1,255	1.6	
Turnout		79,884	93.8	
Two-party-preferred result
Labor	Allen Blanchard		57.2	+10.0
Liberal	John Hyde		42.8	−10.0
Labor gain from Liberal		Swing	+10.0	

=== O'Connor ===
This section is an excerpt from Electoral results for the Division of O'Connor § 1983

1983 Australian federal election: O'Connor
Party	Candidate	Votes	%	±%
Liberal	Wilson Tuckey	29,414	48.6	+8.3
Labor	Kim Chance	19,356	32.0	+8.8
National	Brian Pearce	5,999	9.9	−8.3
National	James Ferguson	3,686	6.1	−8.9
Democrats	Denis Kidby	2,105	3.5	+0.2
Total formal votes		60,560	97.9	
Informal votes		1,303	2.1	
Turnout		61,863	93.8	
Two-party-preferred result
Liberal	Wilson Tuckey		64.1	+1.6
Labor	Kim Chance		35.9	+35.9
Liberal hold		Swing	+1.6	

=== Perth ===
This section is an excerpt from Electoral results for the Division of Perth § 1983

1983 Australian federal election: Perth
Party	Candidate	Votes	%	±%
Labor	Ric Charlesworth	34,108	54.7	+9.0
Liberal	Ross McLean	26,510	42.5	−5.7
Democrats	Geoffrey Syme	1,770	2.8	−2.4
Total formal votes		62,388	97.7	
Informal votes		1,446	2.3	
Turnout		63,834	92.5	
Two-party-preferred result
Labor	Ric Charlesworth		56.4	+7.4
Liberal	Ross McLean		43.6	−7.4
Labor gain from Liberal		Swing	+7.4	

=== Stirling ===
This section is an excerpt from Electoral results for the Division of Stirling § 1983

1983 Australian federal election: Stirling
Party	Candidate	Votes	%	±%
Labor	Ron Edwards	35,828	54.5	+12.3
Liberal	Ian Viner	27,181	41.4	−7.5
Democrats	Maria Phillips	2,695	4.1	−2.7
Total formal votes		65,704	98.3	
Informal votes		1,143	1.7	
Turnout		66,847	94.1	
Two-party-preferred result
Labor	Ron Edwards		57.0	+9.0
Liberal	Ian Viner		43.0	−9.0
Labor gain from Liberal		Swing	+9.0	

=== Swan ===
This section is an excerpt from Electoral results for the Division of Swan § 1983

1983 Australian federal election: Swan
Party	Candidate	Votes	%	±%
Labor	Kim Beazley	38,908	62.7	+9.4
Liberal	Jeffrey Roberts	19,825	32.0	−8.1
Democrats	Kevin Trent	2,662	4.3	−1.1
Socialist Workers	Linda Mere	621	1.0	−0.2
Total formal votes		62,016	97.8	
Informal votes		1,391	2.2	
Turnout		63,407	92.9	
Two-party-preferred result
Labor	Kim Beazley		66.2	+8.6
Liberal	Jeffrey Roberts		33.8	−8.6
Labor hold		Swing	+8.6	

=== Tangney ===
This section is an excerpt from Electoral results for the Division of Tangney § 1983

1983 Australian federal election: Tangney
Party	Candidate	Votes	%	±%
Labor	George Gear	34,899	49.4	+9.1
Liberal	Peter Shack	31,811	45.0	−5.1
Democrats	Ron Murray	2,706	3.8	−5.9
Socialist Workers	Bronwen Beachey	1,236	1.7	+1.7
Total formal votes		70,652	98.2	
Informal votes		1,256	1.8	
Turnout		71,917	94.0	
Two-party-preferred result
Labor	George Gear		53.2	+7.8
Liberal	Peter Shack		46.8	−7.8
Labor gain from Liberal		Swing	+7.8	

== Tasmania ==
1983 Australian federal election (Tasmania)
- 5 March 1983

All 5 Tasmanian seats in the House of Representatives 3 seats needed for a majority
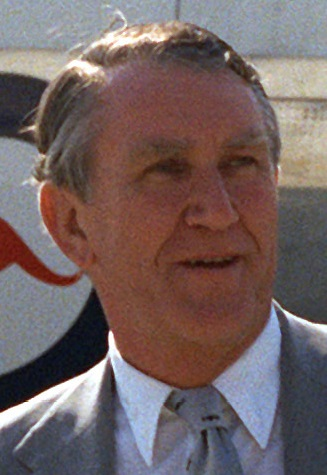

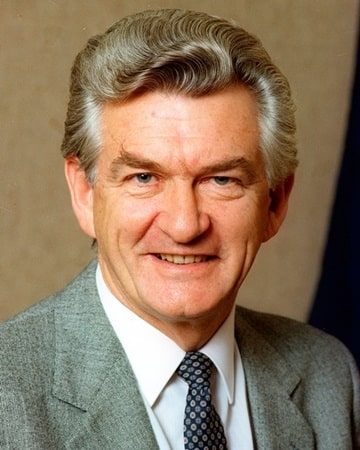
	First party	Second party
Leader	Malcolm Fraser	Bob Hawke
Party	Coalition	Labor
Seats before	5	0
Seats won	5	0
Seat change	Steady	Steady
Primary vote	145,393	106,647
Percentage	54.90%	39.35%
Swing	▲3.00pp	▼0.50pp
TPP	56.42%	43.58%
TPP swing	▲3.52pp	▼3.52pp

=== Bass ===
This section is an excerpt from Electoral results for the Division of Bass § 1983

1983 Australian federal election: Bass
Party	Candidate	Votes	%	±%
Liberal	Kevin Newman	28,448	53.5	+0.5
Labor	John McDonald	19,590	36.8	−7.7
Democrats	Nick Goldie	3,291	6.2	+6.2
Independent	Richard Hutchison	1,884	3.5	+3.5
Total formal votes		53,213	97.4	
Informal votes		1,409	2.6	
Turnout		54,622	95.9	
Two-party-preferred result
Liberal	Kevin Newman		58.3	+4.4
Labor	John McDonald		41.7	−4.4
Liberal hold		Swing	+4.4	

=== Braddon ===
This section is an excerpt from Electoral results for the Division of Braddon § 1983

1983 Australian federal election: Braddon
Party	Candidate	Votes	%	±%
Liberal	Ray Groom	31,143	61.2	+6.1
Labor	Lance Fee	18,016	35.4	−9.5
Democrats	Greg Sargent	1,731	3.4	+3.4
Total formal votes		50,890	97.9	
Informal votes		1,110	2.1	
Turnout		52,000	95.9	
Two-party-preferred result
Liberal	Ray Groom		62.6	+7.5
Labor	Lance Fee		37.4	−7.5
Liberal hold		Swing	+7.5	

=== Denison ===
This section is an excerpt from Electoral results for the Division of Denison § 1983

1983 Australian federal election: Denison
Party	Candidate	Votes	%	±%
Liberal	Michael Hodgman	28,468	54.4	+4.2
Labor	Kathy Smith	21,680	41.5	−4.4
Democrats	Harvey Wallace-Williams	1,743	3.3	−0.6
Socialist Workers	Leica Wagner	406	0.8	+0.8
Total formal votes		52,297	97.8	
Informal votes		1,199	2.2	
Turnout		53,496	96.0	
Two-party-preferred result
Liberal	Michael Hodgman		55.8	+3.4
Labor	Kathy Smith		44.2	−3.4
Liberal hold		Swing	+3.4	

=== Franklin ===
This section is an excerpt from Electoral results for the Division of Franklin § 1983

1983 Australian federal election: Franklin
Party	Candidate	Votes	%	±%
Liberal	Bruce Goodluck	28,814	52.4	+1.1
Labor	Fran Bladel	24,578	44.7	−0.7
Democrats	John Thomson	1,357	2.5	−0.8
Socialist Workers	David Mazengarb	278	0.5	+0.5
Total formal votes		55,027	98.1	
Informal votes		1,047	1.9	
Turnout		56,074	96.2	
Two-party-preferred result
Liberal	Bruce Goodluck		53.5	+0.8
Labor	Fran Bladel		46.5	−0.8
Liberal hold		Swing	+0.8	

=== Wilmot ===
This section is an excerpt from Electoral results for the Division of Wilmot § 1983

1983 Australian federal election: Wilmot
Party	Candidate	Votes	%	±%
Liberal	Max Burr	28,520	53.5	+3.4
Labor	David Llewellyn	22,783	42.7	−7.2
Democrats	Liz Holloway	1,336	2.5	+2.5
Independent	Bill Chugg	702	1.3	+1.3
Total formal votes		53,341	97.3	
Informal votes		1,467	2.7	
Turnout		54,808	96.2	
Two-party-preferred result
Liberal	Max Burr		55.1	+5.0
Labor	David Llewellyn		44.9	−5.0
Liberal hold		Swing	+5.0	

== Australian Capital Territory ==
1983 Australian federal election (ACT)
- 5 March 1983

All 2 ACT seats in the House of Representatives 1 seats needed for a majority
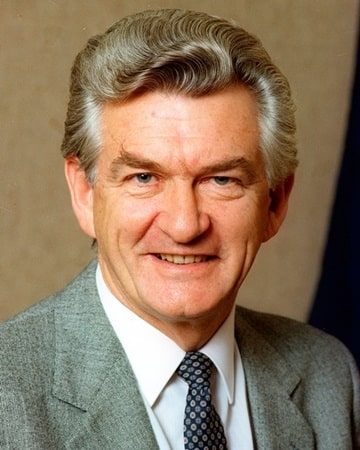

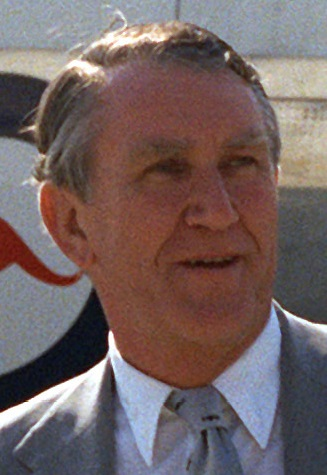
	First party	Second party
Leader	Bob Hawke	Malcolm Fraser
Party	Labor	Coalition
Seats before	2	0
Seats won	2	0
Seat change	Steady	Steady
Primary vote	82,189	48,016
Percentage	62.48%	36.50%
Swing	▲8.75pp	▼0.93pp
TPP	65.49%	34.51%
TPP swing	▲6.89pp	▼6.89pp

=== Canberra ===
This section is an excerpt from Electoral results for the Division of Canberra § 1983

1983 Australian federal election: Canberra
Party	Candidate	Votes	%	±%
Labor	Ros Kelly	40,434	62.2	+9.8
Liberal	Gerard Brennan	22,365	34.4	−7.7
Deadly Serious	Joanne Hansen	2,191	3.4	+3.4
Total formal votes		64,990	98.0	
Informal votes		1,330	2.0	
Turnout		66,320	96.1	
Two-party-preferred result
Labor	Ros Kelly		63.9	+8.2
Liberal	Gerard Brennan		36.1	−8.2
Labor hold		Swing	+8.2	

=== Fraser ===
This section is an excerpt from Electoral results for the Division of Fraser (Australian Capital Territory) § 1983

1983 Australian federal election: Fraser
Party	Candidate	Votes	%	±%
Labor	Ken Fry	41,755	65.6	+8.3
Liberal	Liz Grant	18,848	29.6	−5.0
Deadly Serious	Rohan Greenland	1,619	2.5	+2.5
Independent	Kevin Wise	1,419	2.2	+1.2
Total formal votes		63,641	97.6	
Informal votes		1,572	2.4	
Turnout		65,213	95.3	
Two-party-preferred result
Labor	Ken Fry		68.0	+5.5
Liberal	Liz Grant		32.0	−5.5
Labor hold		Swing	+5.5	

== Northern Territory ==
1983 Australian federal election (Northern Territory)
- 5 March 1983

Division of Northern Territory
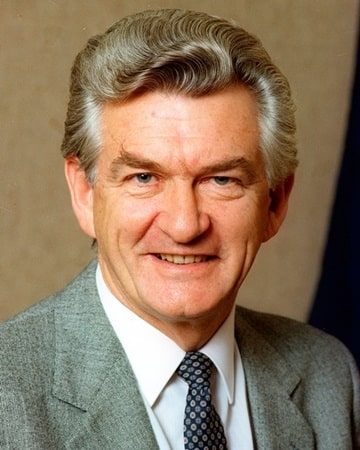

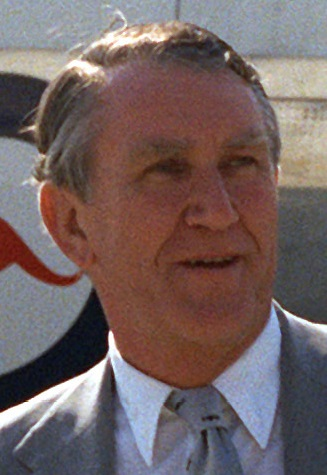
	First party	Second party
Leader	Bob Hawke	Malcolm Fraser
Party	Labor	Coalition
Seats before	0	1
Seats won	1	0
Seat change	▲1	▼1
Primary vote	20,764	20,479
Percentage	46.60%	45.90%
Swing	▲6.20pp	▲2.30pp
TPP	51.87%	48.13%
TPP swing	▲3.07pp	▼3.07pp

This section is an excerpt from Electoral results for the Division of Northern Territory § 1983

1983 Australian federal election: Northern Territory
Party	Candidate	Votes	%	±%
Labor	John Reeves	20,764	46.6	+6.2
Country Liberal	Grant Tambling	20,479	45.9	+2.3
Democrats	Joy King	1,571	3.5	−2.3
Independent	Bill Cain	1,132	2.5	+2.5
Independent	Pamela Gardiner	395	0.9	−1.7
Independent	Strider	252	0.6	+0.6
Total formal votes		44,593	95.6	
Informal votes		2,070	4.4	
Turnout		46,663	81.4	
Two-party-preferred result
Labor	John Reeves	23,132	51.9	+3.1
Country Liberal	Grant Tambling	21,461	48.1	−3.1
Labor gain from Country Liberal		Swing	+3.1	

== See also ==
- Post-election pendulum for the 1983 Australian federal election
- Candidates of the 1983 Australian federal election
- Members of the Australian House of Representatives, 1983–1984
- Results of the 1983 Australian federal election (Senate)
