= Candidates of the 1983 Australian federal election =

This article provides information on candidates who stood for the 1983 Australian federal election. The election was held on 5 March 1983.

== Retiring Members and Senators ==
=== Labor ===
- John Armitage MP (Chifley, NSW)
- Moss Cass MP (Maribyrnong, Vic)
- Ted Innes MP (Melbourne, Vic)
- Charles Jones MP (Newcastle, NSW)
- Les McMahon MP (Sydney, NSW)
- Laurie Wallis MP (Grey, SA)
- Senator Jim Keeffe (Qld)
- Senator Geoff McLaren (SA)
- Senator Tony Mulvihill (NSW)

=== Liberal ===
- Geoffrey Giles MP (Wakefield, SA)

=== National ===
- Peter Nixon MP (Gippsland, Vic)

== House of Representatives ==
Sitting members at the time of the election are shown in bold text. Successful candidates are highlighted in the relevant colour. Where there is possible confusion, an asterisk (*) is also used.

=== Australian Capital Territory ===
Electorate	Held by	Labor candidate	Liberal candidate	Other candidates
Canberra	Labor	**Ros Kelly**	Gerard Brennan	Joanne Hansen (DSPA)
Fraser	Labor	**Ken Fry**	Liz Grant	Rohan Greenland (DSPA); Kevin Wise (Ind)

=== New South Wales ===
Electorate	Held by	Labor candidate	Coalition candidate	Democrats candidate	Other candidates
Banks	Labor	**John Mountford**	Andrew Fairbairn (Lib)	Montague Greene	David Holmes (SWP)
Barton	Liberal	Gary Punch	**Jim Bradfield** (Lib)	Ronald George	Bruce Barton (Ind); Charles Bellchambers (Ind); Jean Lindsay (Ind); Peter Wright (Prog)
Bennelong	Liberal	Donald Vickers	**John Howard** (Lib)		Milo Dunphy (NSWC); Steve Gabell (Ind)
Berowra	Liberal	Maurice Marshan	**Harry Edwards** (Lib)	Pamela Tuckwell	
Blaxland	Labor	**Paul Keating**	David Brown (Lib)	Phillip Grattan	Siong Hoe Goh (SWP)
Bradfield	Liberal	Peter Donovan	**David Connolly** (Lib)	Anthony Dunne	
Calare	National	David Simmons	**Sandy Mackenzie** (Nat)	Ann Ritter	George Simpson (Prog)
Chifley	Labor	Russ Gorman	Edna Mitchell (Lib)	Frances Jones	Christine Broi (SWP); Jonathan Cooper (Ind); Jane Smith/New (Ind)
Cook	Liberal	Michael Addison	**Don Dobie** (Lib)		Henry Soper (Prog)
Cowper	National	Joseph Moran	**Ian Robinson** (Nat)	Peter Brown	
Cunningham	Labor	**Stewart West**	Gary Fisher (Lib)	George Jones	Diana Covell (SWP); Rudolf Pasara (SLL); Romaine Rutnam (CPA)
Dundas	Liberal	Margaret Blaxell	**Philip Ruddock** (Lib)	John Tumminello	
Eden-Monaro	Liberal	Jim Snow	**Murray Sainsbury** (Lib)	Russell Witt	Miriam Naughton (Ind); Ronald Sarina (True Ind)
Farrer	Liberal	Noel Diffey	**Wal Fife** (Lib)	Scott Milne	Maureen Nathan (Prog)
Grayndler	Labor	**Leo McLeay**	Edward James (Lib)	Albert Jarman	David Gibson (SPA); Michael Karadjis (SWP); Joseph Owens (CPA)
Gwydir	National	Robert Hamilton	**Ralph Hunt** (Nat)	Gloria Collison	
Hughes	Labor	**Les Johnson**	Peter Somerville (Lib)	Ronald Hellyer	Stephen Painter (SWP)
Hume	National	Marie McCormick	**Stephen Lusher** (Nat)	Gregory Butler	
Hunter	Labor	**Bob Brown**	James White (Lib)	Edwina Wilson	
Kingsford-Smith	Labor	**Lionel Bowen**	Collin O'Neil (Lib)	Anthony Larkings	Geoffrey Channells (SWP)
Lowe	Labor	**Michael Maher**	Philip Taylor (Lib)	Ralph Rogers	Helen Jarvis (SWP)
Lyne	National	Francis Murray	**Bruce Cowan** (Nat)	Stephen Jeffries	John Bryant (Ind); Alfred Cannings (Ind); John Veenstra (Prog)
Macarthur	Liberal	Colin Hollis	**Michael Baume** (Lib)	Frederic Goodfellow	Martin Essenberg (Ind)
Mackellar	Liberal	Keith Jackson	**Jim Carlton** (Lib)	Robert Williams	Maurice Foley (Ind)
Macquarie	Labor	**Ross Free**	Stephen Screech (Lib)	Richard Jackson-Hope	
Mitchell	Liberal	Arthur Llewellyn	**Alan Cadman** (Lib)	Rona Samuels	
Newcastle	Labor	Allan Morris	Stan Hayward (Lib)	Wayne Jarman	Frank Blefari (Ind); Darrell Dawson (CPA); Brian McDermott (Ind); Geoffrey Payne (SWP)
New England	National	Lawrence Daly	**Ian Sinclair** (Nat)	Ian Dutton	
North Sydney	Liberal	Kirk McKenzie	**John Spender** (Lib)	Rodney Dominish	
Parramatta	Labor	**John Brown**	James Harker-Mortlock (Lib)	Patricia Lamey	Mark Carey (SWP)
Paterson	National	Michael Williams	**Frank O'Keefe** (Nat)	Darrel Woodhouse	
Phillip	Liberal	Jeannette McHugh	**Jack Birney** (Lib)	Karin Sowada	Timothy Daly (Prog); Julien Droulers (Grn); Lawrence Hogan (EAPP)
Prospect	Labor	**Dick Klugman**	Alan Byers (Lib)		Richard Nichols (SWP); Eric Viitala (Ind)
Reid	Labor	**Tom Uren**	Yvonne Maio (Lib)	Stephen Bastian	Lynda Boland (SWP); Michael Gluyas (Ind); Neville Gray (Ind)
Richmond	National	Terence McGee	**Doug Anthony** (Nat)	Kenneth Nicholson	
Riverina	National	Ronald Adams	**Noel Hicks** (Nat)	Lesley Holschier	
Robertson	Labor	**Barry Cohen**	Bev Austin (Lib)	Trevor Willsher	
Shortland	Labor	**Peter Morris**	Peter Wilson (Lib)	Lyn Godfrey	Peter Abrahamson (SWP); Robert Buhler (SLL)
St George	Labor	**Bill Morrison**	George James (Lib)	Ronald Kirkwood	Brian Compton (Ind); Dorothy Tumney (SWP)
Sydney	Labor	Peter Baldwin	Ron Cibas (Lib)	Jennifer Macleod	Aileen Beaver (CPA); James Percy (SWP)
Warringah	Liberal	John Coombs	**Michael MacKellar** (Lib)	Annique Duc	Stephen Markey (Prog)
Wentworth	Liberal	Max Pearce	**Peter Coleman** (Lib)	Brian Hillman	Robert McCarthy (Ind); Neil Roberts (Ind); George Warnecke (Ind); Katherine Wentworth (Ind)
Werriwa	Labor	**John Kerin**	Marie Rutledge (Lib)		David Brandon (Ind); Dorothea Brocksop (SLL); Gail Cumming (SWP)

=== Northern Territory ===
Electorate	Held by	Labor candidate	CLP candidate	Democrats candidate	Independent candidate
Northern Territory	CLP	John Reeves	**Grant Tambling**	Joy King	Bill Cain; Pamela Gardiner; Strider

=== Queensland ===
Electorate	Held by	Labor candidate	Coalition candidate	Democrats candidate	Other candidate
Bowman	Liberal	Len Keogh	Craig Brown (Nat); **David Jull** (Lib)	Ronald Heindorff	
Brisbane	Labor	**Manfred Cross**	Bradley Garrett (Nat); Richard Magnus (Lib)	Lance Winter	Susanne Bolton (SWP)
Capricornia	Labor	**Doug Everingham**	Alan Agnew (Lib); Helen Reeves (Nat); Robert Simpson (Nat)	Gregory Read	David Ryan (SPA)
Darling Downs	National	Ronald Cullin	**Tom McVeigh** (Nat)	David Groves	
Dawson	National	Barbara Hill	**Ray Braithwaite** (Nat)		Kelly Crombie (Prog); Eric Geissmann (Ind); Raymond Jensen (Ind)
Fadden	Liberal	David Beddall	**Don Cameron** (Lib); Howard Edmunds (Nat)	Murray Hallam	Raymond Ferguson (SPA); Dallas Graham (Prog)
Fisher	National	Sol Theo	**Evan Adermann*** (Nat); Dennis Caswell (Lib)	Garry Somerville	
Griffith	Labor	**Ben Humphreys**	Graham Young (Lib)	Carole Ames	Michael Fulton (SLL); Julie Walkington (SWP)
Herbert	Liberal	Ted Lindsay	John Aubrey (Nat); **Gordon Dean** (Lib)	John Lamb	
Kennedy	National	Brigid Walsh	**Bob Katter** (Nat)	George Hannaford	
Leichhardt	National	John Gayler	**David Thomson** (Nat)		
Lilley	Labor	**Elaine Darling**	Jim Anderson (Lib)	Gael Paul	Anthony Catip (Ind)
Maranoa	National	Warren Keats	**Ian Cameron** (Nat)	Austin Brannigan	
McPherson	Liberal	Darryl McArthur	Trevor Watt (Nat); **Peter White*** (Lib)	Kenneth Peterson	Peter Courtney (NHP)
Moreton	Liberal	Barbara Robson	**Sir James Killen** (Lib)	Leonard Fitzgerald	Helen Jones (SWP)
Oxley	Labor	**Bill Hayden**	Les Woodforth (Lib)	Wayne Martin	Juanita Keig (SWP)
Petrie	Liberal	Deane Wells	**John Hodges** (Lib)	Ray Hollis	Christopher Caldwell (Ind); Phillip Grimison (Prog)
Ryan	Liberal	Michael Foley	**John Moore** (Lib)	John Elfick	Anthony Crooks (Ind); Patrick Cusack (Ind)
Wide Bay	National	James Finemore	**Clarrie Millar** (Nat)	Mervyn Worth	Raymond Bird (Prog)

=== South Australia ===
Electorate	Held by	Labor candidate	Liberal candidate	Democrats candidate	Other candidates
Adelaide	Labor	**Chris Hurford**	Barry James	Eileen Farmer	John Buik (Ind); Paul Petit (SWP)
Barker	Liberal	Valerie Young	**James Porter**	Meg Lees	Anthony Beck (Nat)
Bonython	Labor	**Neal Blewett**	Neville Joyce	John Longhurst	
Boothby	Liberal	Bruce Whyatt	**Steele Hall**	John Coulter	
Grey	Labor	Lloyd O'Neil	Joy Baluch	Jack Babbage	James Cronin (Ind); Anthony Haskett (Nat); Kerry Hawkes (LP)
Hawker	Labor	**Ralph Jacobi**	Bruce Harry	Graham Pamount	John Garcia (SWP)
Hindmarsh	Labor	**John Scott**	Barry Lewis	Jim Mitchell	Lotus Cavagnino (SWP)
Kingston	Liberal	Gordon Bilney	**Grant Chapman**	Robert Ralph	
Port Adelaide	Labor	**Mick Young**	Robin Rickards	Benjamin Michael	Robert Fisher (SWP); Donald Sutherland (CPA)
Sturt	Liberal	Sergio Ubaldi	**Ian Wilson**	Alison Dolling	
Wakefield	Liberal	Suzanne Owens	Neil Andrew	Donald Chisholm	Roger Cavanagh (Nat)

=== Tasmania ===
Electorate	Held by	Labor candidate	Liberal candidate	Democrats candidate	Other candidates
Bass	Liberal	John McDonald	**Kevin Newman**	Nick Goldie	Richard Hutchison (Ind)
Braddon	Liberal	Lance Fee	**Ray Groom**	Greg Sargent	
Denison	Liberal	Kathy Smith	**Michael Hodgman**	Harvey Wallace-Williams	Leica Wagner (SWP)
Franklin	Liberal	Fran Bladel	**Bruce Goodluck**	John Thompson	David Mazengarb (SWP)
Wilmot	Liberal	David Llewellyn	**Max Burr**	Liz Holloway	Bill Chugg (Ind)

=== Victoria ===
Electorate	Held by	Labor candidate	Coalition candidate	Democrats candidate	DLP candidate	Other candidates
Balaclava	Liberal	Chris Kennedy	**Ian Macphee** (Lib)	Zelma Furey		Timothy Warner (CNP)
Ballarat	Labor	**John Mildren**	John Ronan (Lib)	Graham Gough		John Blower (Ind); Albert Ireland (Ind)
Batman	Labor	**Brian Howe**	Maxwell Playford (Lib)	Gwendoline Naug	Philip L'Huillier	John Percy (SWP)
Bendigo	Liberal	John Brumby	**John Bourchier** (Lib)	Neil Jewell	Robert Denahy	
Bruce	Liberal	Heather O'Connor	**Sir Billy Snedden** (Lib)	Michael Johnson		
Burke	Labor	**Andrew Theophanous**	Bernie Finn (Lib)	George Hunter		Evelyn Robson (SWP)
Casey	Liberal	Peter Steedman	**Peter Falconer** (Lib)	Michael Nardella	John Garratt	Martin Hetherich (ACP)
Chisholm	Liberal	Helen Mayer	**Graham Harris** (Lib)	Alan Swindon	Kevin Cooper	
Corangamite	Liberal	Gavan O'Connor	**Tony Street** (Lib)			
Corio	Labor	**Gordon Scholes**	Kent Henderson (Lib)	Guenter Sahr		
Deakin	Liberal	John Saunderson	**Alan Jarman** (Lib)	Jeffrey McAlpine	Peter Ferwerda	Wilfrid Thiele (Ind)
Diamond Valley	Liberal	Peter Staples	**Neil Brown** (Lib)	Lynden Kenyon	Anne-Marie Petrucco	
Flinders	Liberal	Bob Chynoweth	**Peter Reith** (Lib)	Harold Fraser	Kenneth Payne	
Gellibrand	Labor	**Ralph Willis**	Peter Goudge (Lib)	Barry McLeod		James Doughney (SWP); Augustus Titter (ANP)
Gippsland	National	Anthony Peterson	Philip Davis (Lib); Peter McGauran* (Nat)	Pierre Forcier	Stewart Taig	Pearce Buckley (Ind); Bruce Ingle (Ind)
Henty	Labor	**Joan Child**	Craig Baxter (Lib)	Harry Eichler	Paul Carroll	
Higgins	Liberal	Jennifer Bundy	**Roger Shipton** (Lib)	Antony Siddons		Maureen Holmes (IBCP)
Holt	Labor	**Michael Duffy**	Joseph Moldrich (Lib)	Jean Yule		
Hotham	Labor	**Lewis Kent**	Peter Bolitho (Lib)	Erwin Frenkel		
Indi	Liberal	Carole Marple	**Ewen Cameron*** (Lib); Kevin Sanderson (Nat)	Geoffrey le Couteur		
Isaacs	Labor	**David Charles**	Ann Dunkley (Lib)	Terence Gough		
Kooyong	Liberal	Avis Meddings	**Andrew Peacock** (Lib)	Keith Bruckner		David Greagg (IBCP)
Lalor	Labor	**Barry Jones**	John Fahey (Lib)	Ivan Pollock		Helen Said (SWP)
La Trobe	Labor	**Peter Milton**	Peter Nugent (Lib)	Milton Blake		Cornelis Hellema (ACP)
Mallee	National	Graeme Jarry	**Peter Fisher*** (Nat); Ross Owen (Lib)	Colin Kavanagh		
Maribyrnong	Labor	Alan Griffiths	Geoffrey Ireland (Lib)	Henrik Jersic		Peter Beharell (SWP); Richard Wright (AP)
McMillan	Labor	**Barry Cunningham**	Stewart Robertson (Nat); Greg Ross (Lib)	Gloria Auchterlonie	John Sellens	
Melbourne	Labor	Gerry Hand	Robert Fallshaw (Lib)	Chris Carter		James Ferrari (IBCP); James McIlroy (SWP)
Melbourne Ports	Labor	**Clyde Holding**	Ronald Flood (Lib)	John Sutcliffe		Brett Trenery (SWP)
Murray	National	Mark Anderson	Anne Adams (Lib); **Bruce Lloyd*** (Nat)	John Weir		Diane Teasdale (Ind)
Scullin	Labor	**Harry Jenkins**	Katheryne Savage (Lib)	Kenneth Peak		Joan Barker (SWP)
Wannon	Liberal	Nancy Genardini	**Malcolm Fraser** (Lib)	Harold Jeffrey		
Wills	Labor	**Bob Hawke**	Mark Hoysted (Lib)	John Hallam	Michael Verberne	Martin Mantell (SLL); Cecil G. Murgatroyd (IBCP); Solomon Salby (SWP)

=== Western Australia ===
Electorate	Held by	Labor candidate	Liberal candidate	Democrats candidate	Other candidates
Canning	Liberal	Wendy Fatin	**Mel Bungey**	Jean Ritter	
Curtin	Liberal	Clive Kittson	**Allan Rocher**	Marjorie McKercher	
Forrest	Liberal	David Churches	**Peter Drummond**	Donald Stewart	Alfred Bussell (Ind)
Fremantle	Labor	**John Dawkins**	Maxwell Adams	Colin Hull	Margo Condoleon (SWP); Timothy Peach (SLL)
Kalgoorlie	Labor	**Graeme Campbell**	Douglas Krepp	Blair Nancarrow	Joseph Boschetti (Ind)
Moore	Liberal	Allen Blanchard	**John Hyde**	Alan Needham	
O'Connor	Liberal	Kim Chance	**Wilson Tuckey**	Denis Kidby	James Ferguson (NPW); Brian Pearce (Nat)
Perth	Liberal	Ric Charlesworth	**Ross McLean**	Geoffrey Syme	
Stirling	Liberal	Ron Edwards	**Ian Viner**	Maria Phillips	
Swan	Labor	**Kim Beazley**	Jeffrey Roberts	Kevin Trent	Linda Mere (SWP)
Tangney	Liberal	George Gear	**Peter Shack**	Ronald Murray	Bronwen Beachey (SWP)

== Senate ==
Sitting Senators are shown in bold text. Since this was a double dissolution election, all senators were up for re-election. The first five successful candidates from each state were elected to six-year terms, the remaining five to three-year terms. Tickets that elected at least one Senator are highlighted in the relevant colour. Successful candidates are identified by an asterisk (*).

=== Australian Capital Territory ===
Two seats were up for election. The Labor Party was defending one seat. The Liberal Party was defending one seat.

Labor candidates	Liberal candidates	Democrats candidates	Ungrouped candidates
1. **Susan Ryan***; 2. Marc Robinson	1. **Margaret Reid***; 2. John Munro	1. Charles Price; 2. Dimmen de Graaff	Brian Scott (Ind); Ian Rout (DSPA)

=== New South Wales ===
Ten seats were up for election. The Labor Party was defending five seats. The Liberal-National Coalition was defending four seats. The Australian Democrats were defending one seat.

Labor candidates	Coalition candidates	Democrats candidates	CTA candidates	EAPP candidates	Peace on Earth candidates
1. **Doug McClelland***; 2. **Arthur Gietzelt***; 3. Graham Richardson*; 4. **Kerry Sibraa***; 5. **Bruce Childs***; 6. Sue West	1. **Sir John Carrick*** (Lib); 2. **Peter Baume*** (Lib); 3. **Douglas Scott*** (Nat); 4. **Misha Lajovic*** (Lib); 5. Chris Puplick (Lib); 6. Doug Moppett (Nat)	1. **Colin Mason***; 2. Paul McLean; 3. Christine Townend; 4. Megan Sampson; 5. Peter Hains; 6. Rodney Irvine	1. Clair Isbister; 2. John Whitehall; 3. Graham McLennan; 4. Kevin Hume; 5. Thomas Toogood; 6. Elaine Nile	1. James Firbank; 2. Valerianne Hill; 3. William Lewis	1. Dudley Leggett; 2. Michelle Sheather
Progress candidates	New Party candidates	SWP candidates	Socialist candidates	Integrity candidates	New Australian candidates
1. Marjorie Wisby; 2. Archibald Brown; 3. William More	1. Vincent Murphy; 2. Stephen Tsousis	1. Amanda Orr; 2. Andres Garin	1. Peter Symon; 2. Harry Black; 3. Stratos Mavrantonis	1. Kenneth Aylward; 2. Antony Maurice; 3. Geoffrey Holt	1. Rudolph Dezelin; 2. Milan Riznic
AFM candidates	Republican candidates	SDP candidates	White Australia candidates	Group A candidates	Ungrouped candidates
1. Jon Axtens; 2. Joseph Fusco	1. Peter Consandine; 2. Peter Maroney	1. Walter Roach; 2. Edward de Bouter; 3. Johann Liszikam	1. Robert Cameron; 2. Russell Scrivener	1. Ronald Weatherall; 2. Keith Gleeson	John Comyns; Glen Davis; Kaine Aalto; Ross Baldwin; Raymond Butcher; Burnum Burnum; Stephen Starkey

=== Northern Territory ===
Two seats were up for election. The Labor Party was defending one seat. The Country Liberal Party was defending one seat.

Labor candidates	CLP candidates	Ungrouped candidates
1. **Ted Robertson***; 2. Denise Fincham	1. **Bernie Kilgariff***; 2. Dallas Drake	Fay Lawrence (Dem); Harold Brown (Ind)

=== Queensland ===
Ten seats were up for election. The Labor Party was defending four seats. The Liberal Party was defending three seats (although Liberal Senator Neville Bonner was contesting the election as an independent). The National Party was defending two seats. The Australian Democrats were defending one seat.

Labor candidates	Liberal candidates	National candidates	Democrats candidates	Bonner candidates	Progress candidates
1. **George Georges***; 2. **Mal Colston***; 3. **Gerry Jones***; 4. Margaret Reynolds*; 5. Robert Gleeson; 6. Susan Yarrow	1. **Kathy Martin***; 2. **David MacGibbon***; 3. Edi Solari; 4. David Watson	1. **Florence Bjelke-Petersen***; 2. **Stan Collard***; 3. Ron Boswell*; 4. Patrick Behan	1. **Michael Macklin***; 2. Stanley Stanley; 3. Gilruth Rees; 4. Anthony Walters; 5. Allan Holz	1. **Neville Bonner**; 2. Audrey Pengelis	1. Vivian Forbes; 2. Jill Weil
Petrov candidates	Integrity candidates	Humanitarian candidates	SWP candidates	Christian Voice candidates	Ungrouped candidates
1. Cyril McKenzie; 2. Vynette McKenzie	1. Victor Bridger; 2. Michael Comerford; 3. Alan Ellis	1. Derek Gillmore; 2. Marcus Platen	1. Jonathan West; 2. John Coleman	1. John Herzog; 2. Tass Augustakis; 3. John Carlisle	John Fitzgerald; Norman Eather; Anthony Catip; Ivan Harris; Estelle Cattoni; Francis Ross; Milan Lorman

=== South Australia ===
Ten seats were up for election. The Labor Party was defending four seats. The Liberal Party was defending five seats. The Australian Democrats were defending one seat.

Labor candidates	Liberal candidates	Democrats candidates	National candidates	Communist candidates	Integrity candidates
1. **Ron Elstob***; 2. **Dominic Foreman***; 3. **Nick Bolkus***; 4. Graham Maguire*; 5. Rosemary Crowley*; 6. Brian Keneally	1. **Tony Messner***; 2. **Robert Hill***; 3. **Don Jessop***; 4. **Baden Teague***; 5. **Sir Harold Young**; 6. Graham Ingerson	1. **Janine Haines***; 2. Ted Radoslovich; 3. Margaret-Ann Williams; 4. David Vigor; 5. John Beech; 6. Patricia Shortridge	1. Kevin Schulz; 2. William Nosworthy; 3. Stanley Draganoff	1. Anne McMenamin; 2. John Humphrys	1. Betty Luks; 2. Barry Lindner; 3. Belle Harris; 4. John Wadey
SWP candidates	SDP candidates	Socialist candidates	Ungrouped candidates		
1. Douglas Lorimer; 2. Jennifer Fisher	1. Roger Orsmby; 2. John Parker	1. Brian Rooney; 2. Laurence Kiek	William Forster (Libertarian); Colin George (Ind)		

=== Tasmania ===
Ten seats were up for election. The Labor Party was defending four seats. The Liberal Party was defending five seats. Independent Senator Brian Harradine was defending one seat.

Labor candidates	Coalition candidates	Democrats candidates	Harradine candidates
1. **Don Grimes***; 2. **Michael Tate***; 3. **Jean Hearn***; 4. **John Coates***; 5. John White; 6. Vicki Buchanan	1. **Peter Rae***; 2. **Shirley Walters***; 3. **Brian Archer***; 4. **Michael Townley***; 5. **John Watson***; 6. Gordon Ibbett	1. Norm Sanders; 2. Peter Creet; 3. Margaret Duthoit	1. **Brian Harradine***; 2. John Jones

=== Victoria ===
Ten seats were up for election. The Labor Party was defending four seats. The Liberal-National Coalition was defending four seats. The Australian Democrats were defending two seats.

Labor candidates	Coalition candidates	Democrats candidates	DLP candidates	Integrity candidates	Advance Victoria candidates
1. **John Button***; 2. **Gareth Evans***; 3. **Cyril Primmer***; 4. **Robert Ray***; 5. Olive Zakharov*; 6. Geoffrey Fary	1. **Dame Margaret Guilfoyle*** (Lib); 2. **Austin Lewis*** (Lib); 3. **Alan Missen*** (Lib); 4. **David Hamer*** (Lib); 5. Shirley McKerrow (Nat); 6. Murray Buzza (Nat)	1. **Don Chipp***; 2. **John Siddons**; 3. Janet Powell; 4. Ian Price	1. Brian Handley; 2. Edna Hall; 3. John Easton; 4. James Jordan	1. Robert J. Steer; 2. Louis Cook; 3. Robert B. Steer; 4. Beverley Meagher; 5. Miliano Mele	1. Thomas Kelly; 2. Ellen Kelly; 3. Stephen Kelly; 4. Nicholas Kelly
Socialist candidates	PTBA candidates	SWP candidates	Pensioner candidates	Progress candidates	SDP candidates
1. Trevor McCandless; 2. Mark Treloar	1. Athol Kelly; 2. Graham Todd	1. Maree Walk; 2. Andrew Jamieson	1. Neil McKay; 2. Joseph Radcliffe; 3. George Cole	1. Ian Mackechnie; 2. David Miller	1. Joseph Johnson; 2. Brian Coe
Ungrouped candidates					
Jim Cairns (Ind); Andrew Kaspariunas (Ind); Louis Constant (Ind); Nikolaos Millios (Eth)	Earl Mignon (Ind); Leonard Stubbs (Ind); Umberto Mammarella (Ind); Patrick Flanagan (Ind)				

=== Western Australia ===
Ten seats were up for election. The Labor Party was defending four seats. The Liberal Party was defending six seats.

Labor candidates	Liberal candidates	Democrats candidates	National candidates	NPW candidates	SWP candidates
1. **Peter Walsh***; 2. **Ruth Coleman***; 3. **Gordon McIntosh***; 4. **Patricia Giles***; 5. Peter Cook*; 6. Jim McKiernan	1. **Fred Chaney***; 2. **Peter Durack***; 3. **Noel Crichton-Browne***; 4. **Reg Withers***; 5. **Andrew Thomas**; 6. **John Martyr**	1. Jack Evans*; 2. Shirley de la Hunty; 3. Richard Jeffreys; 4. James Anderson	1. Albert Llewellyn; 2. John Sattler; 3. Rodney Frost	1. Murray Anderson; 2. Edna Adams; 3. Donald Bannister	1. Anthony Forward; 2. Peter Holloway
SDP candidates	Group H candidates	Group I candidates			
1. Richard Savage; 2. Kerry Stevens	1. Robin Linke; 2. Charles Lee	1. Francesco Nesci; 2. Nellie Stuart			

== Summary by party ==
Beside each party is the number of seats contested by that party in the House of Representatives for each state, as well as an indication of whether the party contested the Senate election in the respective state.

Party	NSW		Vic		Qld		WA		SA		Tas		ACT		NT		Total	
Party	HR	S	HR	S	HR	S	HR	S	HR	S	HR	S	HR	S	HR	S	HR	S
Australian Labor Party	43	*	33	*	19	*	11	*	11	*	5	*	2	*	1	*	125	8
Liberal Party of Australia	34	*	33	*	13	*	11	*	11	*	5	*	2	*			109	7
National Party of Australia	9	*	5	*	14	*	1	*	3	*							32	5
Country Liberal Party															1	*	1	1
Australian Democrats	39	*	32	*	17	*	11	*	11	*	5	*		*	1	*	116	8
Socialist Workers Party	15	*	9	*	4	*	3	*	4	*	2						37	5
Progress Party	7	*		*	4	*											11	3
Democratic Labor Party			11	*													11	1
Socialist Labour League	3		1		1		1										6	
Communist Party of Australia	4								1	*							5	1
Imperial British Conservative Party			4														4	
Socialist Party of Australia	1	*		*	2					*							3	3
Deadly Serious Party													2	*			2	1
Conservative Nationalist Party			2														2	
Australian Christian Party			2														2	
Engineered Australia Plan Party	1	*															1	1
National Humanitarian Party					1	*											1	1
National Party of Western Australia							1	*									1	1
Libertarian Party of Australia									1	*							1	1
National South West Coalition	1																1	
True Independent	1																1	
New South Wales Green Party	1																1	
Australia Party			1														1	
Social Democratic Party		*		*				*		*								4
Integrity Team		*		*		*				*								4
Call to Australia		*																1
Peace on Earth		*																1
The New Party		*																1
New Australian Party		*																1
Australian Family Movement		*																1
Republican Party of Australia		*																1
White Australia Movement		*																1
Advance Victoria				*														1
Proud to be Australian				*														1
Pensioner Party of Australia				*														1
Ethnic Party of Australia				*														1
Party to Expose the Petrov Conspiracy						*												1
Christian Voice						*												1
Independent and other	23		6		6		2		2		2		1		3		45	

== See also ==
- 1983 Australian federal election
- Members of the Australian House of Representatives, 1980–1983
- Members of the Australian House of Representatives, 1983–1984
- Members of the Australian Senate, 1981–1983
- Members of the Australian Senate, 1983–1985
- List of political parties in Australia
