= 1983 Moreton by-election =

Australian federal by-election

5 November 1983
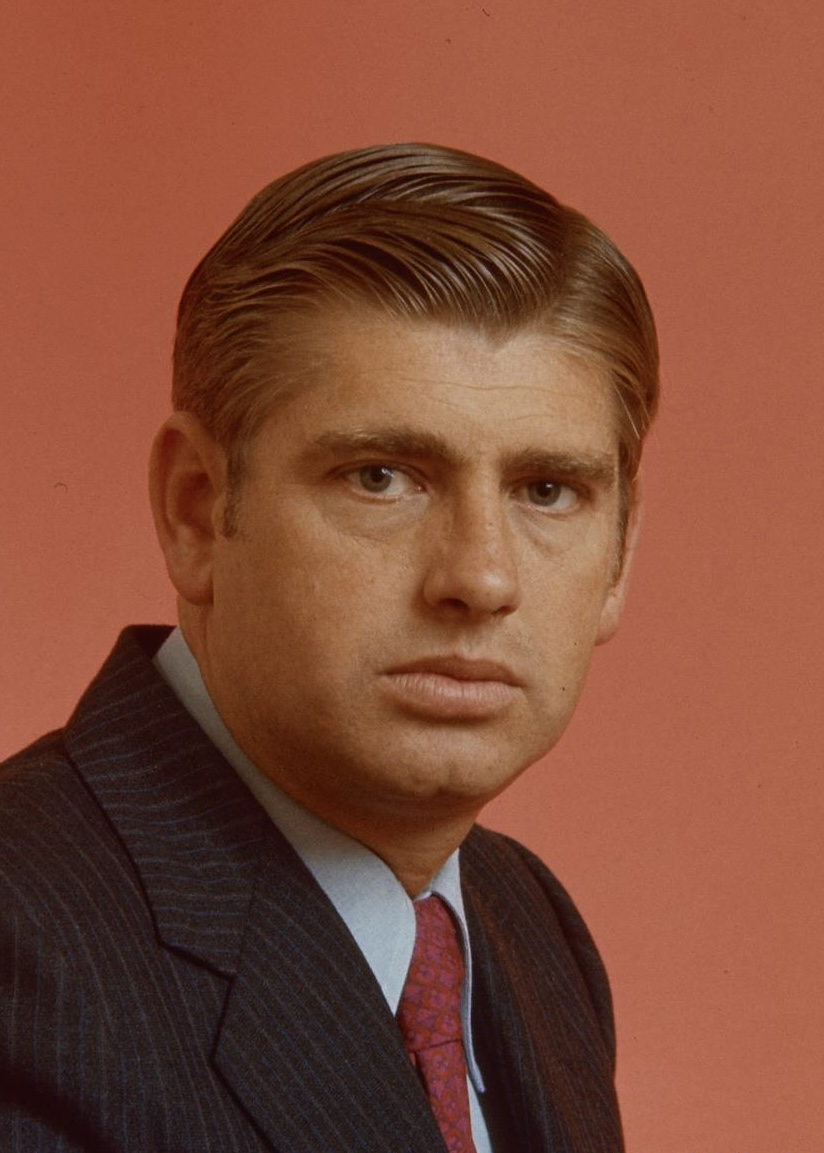

	First party	Second party
Candidate	Don Cameron	Barbara Robson
Party	Liberal	Labor
Popular vote	31,440	28,130
Percentage	52.1%	46.6%
Swing	▲5.4pp	▲1.1pp
TPP	52.8%	47.2%
TPP swing	▲1.2pp	▼1.2pp
MP before election
James Killen
Liberal
Elected MP
Don Cameron
Liberal

A by-election was held for the Australian House of Representatives seat of Moreton on 5 November 1983. This was triggered by the resignation of Liberal Party MP James Killen.

== Candidates ==
- Liberal Party of Australia – Don Cameron, previously the member for Griffith (1966–1977) and Fadden (1977–1983).
- Australian Pensioner Pressure Group – Norman Eather.
- National Humanitarian Party – Marcus Platen.
- Australian Labor Party – Barbara Robson.

== Results ==
Moreton by-election, 1983
Party	Candidate	Votes	%	±%
Liberal	Don Cameron	31,440	52.1	+5.4
Labor	Barbara Robson	28,130	46.6	+1.1
Pensioner	Norman Eather	508	0.8	+0.8
Humanitarian	Marcus Platen	252	0.4	+0.4
Total formal votes		60,330	98.9	+0.4
Informal votes		655	1.1	−0.4
Turnout		60,985	90.6	−2.2
Two-party-preferred result
Liberal	Don Cameron	31,882	52.8	+1.2
Labor	Barbara Robson	28,448	47.2	−1.2
Liberal hold		Swing	+1.2	

== See also ==
- List of Australian federal by-elections
