= Anthony Walters =

Anthony Walters may refer to:

- Anthony Walters (American football) (born 1988), American football player
- Anthony Walters (cricketer) (born 1953), Tasmanian cricketer
- Anthony Walters, one of the Candidates of the Australian federal election, 1983
- Anthony Walters, actor in Shining Through

== See also ==
- Tony Walters, Australian actor and director
- Vernon Anthony Walters, U.S. soldier and diplomat
