= Engineered Australia Plan Party =

Political party in Australia

The Engineered Australia Plan Party (EAPP) was a minor Australian political party that contested the 1983 federal election, without success.

The EAPP was founded in 1982 by Laurie Hogan (who had written a book called Man-Made Mountain), the party aimed to use "engineering skill" to help achieve full employment, a higher standard of living and economic stability by funding industrial production internally. It proposed to finance this with money from mining and related industries, as well as the creation of 180,000 fish breeding dams, 48 new cities, and a man-made mountain to influence Australia's weather patterns.
