= Deadly Serious Party =

- Registered: 26 October 1984
- Dissolved: 2 November 1988
- Ideology: Joke party

The Deadly Serious Party was a political party that stood candidates in Australian elections in the 1980s. The party was created by Australian candidates with the goal of mocking other candidates. Its platform included dispatching a flock of killer penguins to protect Australia's coastline from Argentine invasion, an age freeze, and the appointment of silly people to all the portfolios that matter. It was deregistered effective 2 November 1988 for not having the required 500 members.
