= National Humanitarian Party =

Defunct Australian political party

The National Humanitarian Party was a minor Australian political party that contested the 1983 federal election in Queensland, running one candidate for the House of Representatives and a team for the Senate.
