= 1983 Australian federal election =

- 5 March 1983

All 125 seats in the House of Representatives 63 seats were needed for a majority in the House All 64 seats in the Senate
- Registered: 9,372,064 ▲3.86%
- Turnout: 8,870,175 (94.64%) (▲0.29 pp)
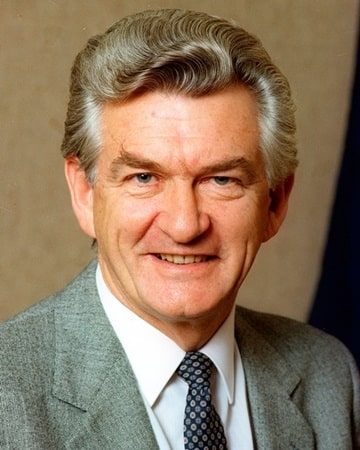

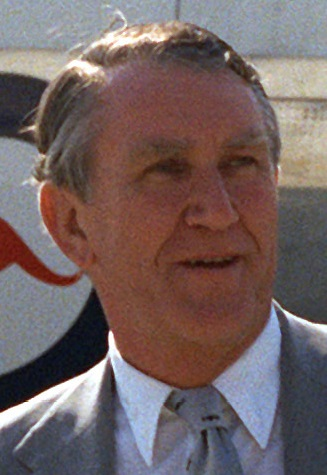
	First party	Second party
Leader	Bob Hawke	Malcolm Fraser
Party	Labor	Liberal–National Coalition
Leader since	8 February 1983	21 March 1975
Leader's seat	Wills (Vic.)	Wannon (Vic.)
Last election	51 seats	74 seats
Seats won	75 seats	50 seats
Seat change	▲24	▼24
First preference vote	4,297,392	3,787,151
Percentage	49.48%	43.61%
Swing	▲4.34%	▼2.79%
TPP	53.23%	46.77%
TPP swing	▲3.63%	▼3.63%
- Results by division for the House of Representatives, shaded by winning party's margin of victory.
Prime Minister before election
Malcolm Fraser
Liberal/National coalition
Subsequent Prime Minister
Bob Hawke
Labor

A federal election was held in Australia on 5 March 1983. All 125 seats in the House of Representatives and all 64 seats in the Senate were up for election, following a double dissolution. The incumbent Coalition government which had been in power since 1975, led by Malcolm Fraser (Liberal Party) and Doug Anthony (National Party), was defeated in a landslide by the opposition Labor Party led by Bob Hawke.

This election marked the end of the seven year Liberal–National Coalition Fraser government and the start of the 13 year Hawke-Keating Labor government. The Coalition would spend its longest ever period in opposition and the Labor party would spend its longest ever period of government at a federal level. The Coalition would not return to government until the 1996 election.

Hawke became the second Labor leader after World War II to lead the party to victory from opposition, after Gough Whitlam in 1972 and before Kevin Rudd in 2007 and Anthony Albanese in 2022.

== Background and issues ==
At the time of the election, the economy suffered from high inflation and high unemployment, alongside increases in industrial disputation and drought across much of the rural areas. The coalition government had been led by Prime Minister Malcolm Fraser since 1975. Fraser had fought off a leadership challenge from Andrew Peacock, who had resigned from the Cabinet citing Fraser's "manic determination to get his own way", a phrase Fraser had himself used when he resigned from John Gorton's government in 1971. The Liberal government had to contend with the early-1980s recession. They unexpectedly won the December 1982 Flinders by-election, after having lost the March 1982 Lowe by-election with a large swing.

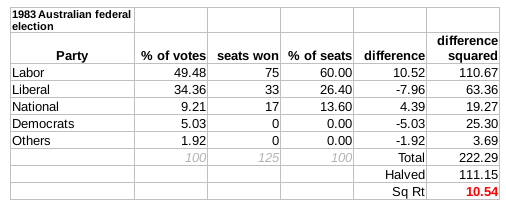
The Gallagher Index result: 10.54

Hawke had entered Parliament at the 1980 federal election following a decade as leader of the Australian Council of Trade Unions (ACTU). Labor factions began to push for the deposition of Bill Hayden from the party leadership in favour of Hawke. Fraser was well aware of the ructions in Labor, and originally planned to call an election for 1982, more than a year before it was due. However, he was forced to scrap those plans after suffering a severe back injury.

On 3 February 1983 at a meeting in Brisbane held in conjunction with the state funeral of former Labor Prime Minister Frank Forde, Hayden resigned on the advice of his closest supporters such as Senator John Button. An election was not due for seven more months; however, Fraser, emboldened by the unexpected retention of Flinders, had caught wind of the impending change and attempted to immediately call an election (for 5 March), which would have put Parliament into "caretaker mode" and essentially frozen Labor into contesting the election with Hayden as leader.

However, Fraser could not secure a swift dissolution of parliament as paperwork for the double dissolution had to be prepared, delaying the official proclamation by Governor-General, Sir Ninian Stephen by a few hours. Fraser had hoped to do this before the announcement of the change in Labor leadership. Unfortunately for Fraser, Hayden had resigned two hours before Fraser travelled to Government House. He only learned Hayden had resigned after the writs formally issued.

Richard de Crespigny (future Captain of Qantas flight 32 which was crippled on a flight from Singapore to Sydney), who was serving at this time as aide de camp to Governor-General Stephen, details this event in his book. The actual double dissolution of the parliament occurred the following day on 4 February. Fraser also hoped to gain control of the Senate, where the Australian Democrats had held the balance of power since 1 July 1981.

Five days later on 8 February, the ALP formally elected Hawke as party leader. Fraser was intensely unpopular at the time, and now faced the prospect of going into an election facing a Labor Party led by the popular Hawke. In response to his abrupt removal, Hayden made his famous claim that a "drover's dog" could lead the ALP to victory. Fraser's campaign used the slogan "We're Not Waiting for the World", while Hawke's campaign theme was based around his favoured leadership philosophy of consensus, using the slogan "Bringing Australia Together".

The Ash Wednesday bushfires that devastated areas of Victoria and South Australia on 16 February disrupted the Prime Minister's re-election campaign which was unofficially put on hold while he toured the affected areas.

Fraser tried to brand Hawke as a union organiser who was too friendly towards Communism. On the security of the banking system to protect people's savings, he asserted that ordinary people's money was safer under their beds than in a bank under Labor. In response to an attack, Hawke laughed and said "you can't keep your money under the bed because that's where the Commies are!"

As counting progressed on election night, it was obvious early on that the ALP had won with a massive swing. Hawke with wife Hazel claimed victory and a tearful Fraser conceded defeat. Ultimately, Labor achieved a 24-seat swing —- the largest defeat of a sitting government since 1949 and the worst defeat a sitting non-Labor government has ever suffered. Fraser soon resigned from Parliament, leaving the Liberal leadership to his long-term foe Andrew Peacock, who would later have a fierce leadership battle himself with the future Liberal Prime Minister John Howard.

The Labor Party would spend 13 years in government, with both Hawke and Paul Keating as leaders—the longest period of continuous federal government in the party's history.

== Voting intention ==
Date	Brand	Firm	Interview mode	Primary vote
				L/NP	ALP	DEM	OTH
5 March 1983 election				43.61%	49.48%	5.03%	1.88%
3 March 1983	Gallup	Morgan	Telephone	43%	50%	6%	1%
2 March 1983	Spectrum	Australian	Telephone	42%	52%	5%	1%
27 – 28 February 1983	ANOP	National Times	Telephone	42%	51.5%	5%	1.5%
19 – 20 February 1983	Gallup	Morgan	Telephone	42%	52%	4%	2%
12 – 13 February 1983	Gallup	Morgan	Telephone	41%	52%	5%	2%
5 – 6 February 1983	Gallup	Morgan	Telephone	41%	52%	5%	2%
22 – 29 January 1983	Gallup	Morgan	Telephone	43%	48%	7%	2%
18 October 1980 election				46.40%	45.15%	6.57%	1.88%

== Results ==
=== House of Representatives ===
Government (75) Labor (75) Opposition (50) Coalition Liberal (33) National (17)

House of Reps (IRV) – 1983–84—Turnout 94.64% (CV) – Informal 2.09%
Party	First preference votes	%	Swing	Seats	Change
Labor	4,297,392	49.48	+4.34	75	▲24
Liberal–National coalition	3,787,151	43.61	–2.79	50	▼24
Liberal	2,983,986	34.36	−3.07	33	▼21
National	782,824	9.01	+0.27	17	▼2
Country Liberal	20,471	0.24	+0.01	0	▼1
Democrats	437,265	5.03	−1.54		
Others	162,925	1.87			
Total	8,684,862			125	
Two-party-preferred (estimated)
Labor		53.23	+3.6	75	▲24
Coalition		46.77	−3.6	50	▼24
Invalid/blank votes	185,312	2.1			
Turnout	8,870,175	94.6			
Registered voters	9,372,064				
Source: Federal Election Results 1949-1993

Popular vote
Labor	49.48%
Liberal	34.36%
National	9.25%
Democrats	5.03%
Other	1.88%

Two-party-preferred vote
Labor	53.23%
Coalition	46.77%

Parliament seats
Labor	60.00%
Coalition	40.00%

=== Senate ===
Government (30) Labor (30) Opposition (28) Coalition Liberal (23) National (4) CLP (1) Crossbench (6) Democrats (5) Independent (1)

Senate (STV) – 1983–84—Turnout 94.64% (CV) – Informal 9.87%
Party	Votes	%	Swing	Seats won	Total seats	Change
Labor	3,637,316	45.49	+3.24	30	30	+3
Liberal–National coalition	3,195,397	39.97	–3.51	28	28	–3
Liberal–National joint ticket	1,861,618	23.28	−2.35	8	*	*
Liberal (separate ticket)	923,571	11.55	−1.59	16	23	–4
National (separate ticket)	388,802	4.86	+0.41	3	4	+1
Country Liberal	21,406	0.27	+0.02	1	1	0
Democrats	764,911	9.57	+0.31	5	5	0
Call to Australia	96,065					0
Progress Party	1,905					0
White Australia	1,025					0
Independents	193,454	2.42	+1.29	1	1	0
Other	203,967	2.55	−1.34	0	0	0
Total	7,995,045			64	64	

Notes

- In New South Wales and Victoria, the coalition parties ran a joint ticket. Of the eight senators elected on a joint ticket, seven were members of the Liberal Party and one was a member of the National Party. In Queensland, South Australia, and Western Australia, the coalition parties ran on separate tickets. In the ACT and Tasmania, only the Liberal Party ran a ticket. In the Northern Territory, only the Country Liberal Party ran a ticket.
- The sole independent elected was Brian Harradine of Tasmania.

== Seats changing hands ==
Seat	Pre-1983			Swing	Post-1983		
Seat	Party	Member	Margin	Swing	Margin	Member	Party
Barton, NSW	Liberal	Jim Bradfield	0.4	4.4	4.0	Gary Punch	Labor
Bendigo, Vic	Liberal	John Bourchier	1.3	4.1	2.8	John Brumby	Labor
Bowman, Qld	Liberal	David Jull	1.2	3.4	2.2	Len Keogh	Labor
Calare, NSW	National	Sandy Mackenzie	1.5	4.4	2.9	David Simmons	Labor
Canning, WA	Liberal	Mel Bungey	1.8	9.2	7.4	Wendy Fatin	Labor
Casey, Vic	Liberal	Peter Falconer	1.9	2.6	0.7	Peter Steedman	Labor
Chisholm, Vic	Liberal	Graham Harris	2.2	4.4	2.2	Helen Mayer	Labor
Deakin, Vic	Liberal	Alan Jarman	2.3	4.4	2.1	John Saunderson	Labor
Diamond Valley, Vic	Liberal	Neil Brown	3.7	4.1	0.4	Peter Staples	Labor
Eden-Monaro, NSW	Liberal	Murray Sainsbury	2.8	4.6	1.8	Jim Snow	Labor
Fadden, Qld	Liberal	Don Cameron	1.5	3.1	1.7	David Beddall	Labor
Flinders, Vic	Liberal	Peter Reith	2.3	5.6	1.0	Bob Chynoweth	Labor
Herbert, Qld	Liberal	Gordon Dean	0.9	3.7	2.8	Ted Lindsay	Labor
Kingston, SA	Liberal	Grant Chapman	0.2	3.3	3.1	Gordon Bilney	Labor
Leichhardt, Qld	National	David Thomson	1.1	3.2	2.1	John Gayler	Labor
Macarthur, NSW	Liberal	Michael Baume	3.2	5.3	2.1	Colin Hollis	Labor
Moore, WA	Liberal	John Hyde	2.8	10.0	7.2	Allen Blanchard	Labor
Northern Territory, NT	Country Liberal	Grant Tambling	1.2	3.1	1.9	John Reeves	Labor
Perth, WA	Liberal	Ross McLean	1.0	7.4	6.4	Ric Charlesworth	Labor
Petrie, Qld	Liberal	John Hodges	3.4	3.9	0.5	Dean Wells	Labor
Phillip, NSW	Liberal	Jack Birney	0.6	2.5	1.9	Jeannette McHugh	Labor
Stirling, WA	Liberal	Ian Viner	2.0	9.0	7.0	Ron Edwards	Labor
Tangney, WA	Liberal	Peter Shack	4.6	7.8	3.2	George Gear	Labor

- Members listed in italics did not contest their seat at this election.

== See also ==
- Candidates of the Australian federal election, 1983
- Members of the Australian House of Representatives, 1983–1984
- Members of the Australian Senate, 1983–1985

== Notes ==
- Prior to 1984 the AEC did not undertake a full distribution of preferences for statistical purposes. The stored ballot papers for the 1983 election were put through this process prior to their destruction. Therefore, the figures from 1983 onwards show the actual result based on full distribution of preferences. The 1983 swing of approximately 3.6 points is based on a pure deduction of one result from the other.
