= Results of the 1987 Australian federal election in Victoria =

1987 Australian federal election (Victoria)
← 1984	11 July 1987	1990 →

All 39 Victoria seats in the Australian House of Representatives and all 12 seats in the Australian Senate
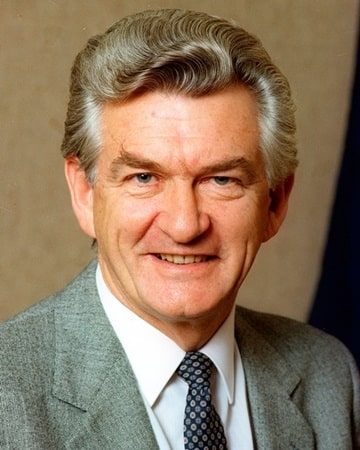

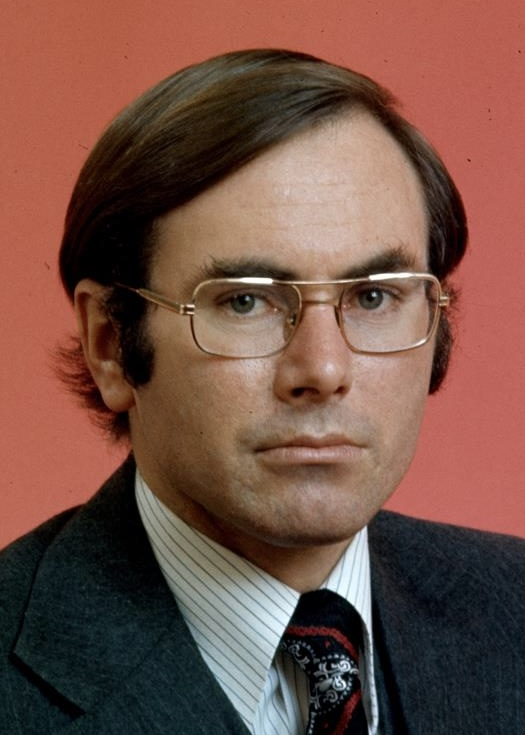
	First party	Second party
Leader	Bob Hawke	John Howard
Party	Labor	Liberal/National coalition
Last election	25	14 seats
Seats won	24 seats	15 seats
Seat change	▼1	▲1
Popular vote	1,139,437	1,076,408
Percentage	46.9%	44.3%
Swing	▼3.0	▲1.2
TPP	52.31%	47.69%
TPP swing	▼0.78	▲0.78

This is a list of electoral division results for the Australian 1987 federal election in the state of Victoria.

== Overall results ==
Turnout 94.9% (CV) — Informal 5.2%
Party	Votes	%	Swing	Seats	Change
Liberal	922,680	38.02	1.14	12	▲1
National	154,088	6.35	–0.02	3	Steady
Liberal/National Coalition	1,076,768	44.37	1.13	15	▲1
Labor	1,139,337	46.95	–1.99	24	▼1
Democrats	163,160	6.72	0.35		
Independent	34,491	1.42	–0.73		
Unite Australia	5,427	0.22			
Pensioner	3,346	0.14	0.02		
Democratic Labor	3,334	0.14	–4.90		
Socialist Workers	1,097	0.04	–0.02		
Total	2,426,960			39	
Two-party-preferred vote
Labor	1,268,894	52.31	–0.78	24	▼1
Liberal/National Coalition	1,157,037	47.69	+0.78	15	▲1
Invalid/blank votes	134,415	5.25	–2.95		
Turnout	2,561,375	95.1			
Registered voters	2,698,034				
Source: Psephos Adam Carr's Election Archive 1987

== Results by division ==
=== Aston ===
1987 Australian federal election: Aston
Party	Candidate	Votes	%	±%
Labor	John Saunderson	30,817	48.4	−2.7
Liberal	Gordon Ashley	26,595	41.8	+2.4
Democrats	Jan Bricknell	5,134	8.1	+1.2
National	Hugh Gurney	1,113	1.8	+1.8
Total formal votes		63,659	95.2	
Informal votes		3,207	4.8	
Turnout		66,866	95.8	
Two-party-preferred result
Labor	John Saunderson	34,099	53.6	−2.9
Liberal	Gordon Ashley	29,547	46.4	+2.9
Labor hold		Swing	−2.9	

=== Ballarat ===
1987 Australian federal election: Ballarat
Party	Candidate	Votes	%	±%
Labor	John Mildren	31,447	47.1	−2.3
Liberal	John Ronan	24,059	36.0	−8.4
National	John Boland	8,250	12.3	+10.8
Democrats	Phil Henseleit	2,685	4.0	+0.6
Independent	Martin Greany	392	0.6	+0.6
Total formal votes		66,833	96.4	
Informal votes		2,460	3.6	
Turnout		69,293	96.5	
Two-party-preferred result
Labor	John Mildren	34,674	51.9	−0.1
Liberal	John Ronan	32,147	48.1	+0.1
Labor hold		Swing	−0.1	

=== Batman ===
1987 Australian federal election: Batman
Party	Candidate	Votes	%	±%
Labor	Brian Howe	35,285	64.0	−7.6
Liberal	Ron Dunn	13,408	24.3	+3.5
Democrats	Jan Roberts	5,321	9.7	+5.4
Independent	Sue Phillips	632	1.1	+1.1
Independent	Darren Chapman	466	0.8	+0.8
Total formal votes		55,112	90.2	
Informal votes		6,000	9.8	
Turnout		61,112	93.1	
Two-party-preferred result
Labor	Brian Howe	40,041	72.8	−1.9
Liberal	Ron Dunn	14,983	27.2	+1.9
Labor hold		Swing	−1.9	

=== Bendigo ===
1987 Australian federal election: Bendigo
Party	Candidate	Votes	%	±%
Labor	John Brumby	32,312	48.5	−0.6
Liberal	John Radford	16,508	24.8	−11.9
National	Ron Best	14,703	22.1	+13.2
Democrats	Kaye Swanton	2,700	4.0	+0.8
Independent	John Somerville	330	0.5	+0.5
Independent	Sharyne O'Grady	126	0.2	+0.2
Total formal votes		66,679	96.2	
Informal votes		2,661	3.8	
Turnout		69,340	96.2	
Two-party-preferred result
Labor	John Brumby	35,677	53.5	+1.4
Liberal	John Radford	31,046	46.5	−1.4
Labor hold		Swing	+1.4	

=== Bruce ===
1987 Australian federal election: Bruce
Party	Candidate	Votes	%	±%
Liberal	Ken Aldred	28,568	47.5	+0.8
Labor	Patrick Robinson	25,866	43.0	−0.6
Democrats	Kare Carr	4,820	8.0	+2.0
Unite Australia	Terence Pooley	910	1.5	+1.5
Total formal votes		60,164	95.0	
Informal votes		3,171	5.0	
Turnout		63,335	96.0	
Two-party-preferred result
Liberal	Ken Aldred	31,282	52.0	−0.1
Labor	Patrick Robinson	28,862	48.0	+0.1
Liberal hold		Swing	−0.1	

=== Burke ===
1987 Australian federal election: Burke
Party	Candidate	Votes	%	±%
Labor	Neil O'Keefe	32,738	49.3	+0.6
Liberal	Peter Dale	25,534	38.5	−2.8
Democrats	Susan Mullington	4,793	7.2	+1.4
National	Barry McLeod	3,278	4.9	+1.7
Total formal votes		66,343	95.4	
Informal votes		3,214	4.6	
Turnout		69,557	94.9	
Two-party-preferred result
Labor	Neil O'Keefe	36,098	54.4	+1.5
Liberal	Peter Dale	30,206	45.6	−1.5
Labor hold		Swing	+1.5	

=== Calwell ===
1987 Australian federal election: Calwell
Party	Candidate	Votes	%	±%
Labor	Andrew Theophanous	36,614	61.1	−7.7
Liberal	Chris Dimitrijevic	16,244	27.1	+2.2
Democrats	Louise Stewart	5,938	9.9	+5.2
National	Ivan Pavlekovich-Smith	1,130	1.9	+1.9
Total formal votes		59,926	90.1	
Informal votes		6,555	9.9	
Turnout		66,481	96.0	
Two-party-preferred result
Labor	Andrew Theophanous	41,077	68.6	−3.6
Liberal	Chris Dimitrijevic	18,807	31.4	+3.6
Labor hold		Swing	−3.6	

=== Casey ===
1987 Australian federal election: Casey
Party	Candidate	Votes	%	±%
Liberal	Bob Halverson	30,225	46.7	+2.8
Labor	David McKenzie	27,891	43.1	−1.1
Democrats	Chris Mar	5,071	7.8	+1.3
National	Roy Haffenden	861	1.3	+0.0
Pensioner	Flo Madden	617	1.0	+0.0
Total formal votes		64,665	96.6	
Informal votes		2,257	3.4	
Turnout		66,922	96.2	
Two-party-preferred result
Liberal	Bob Halverson	33,125	51.2	+0.6
Labor	David McKenzie	31,528	48.8	−0.6
Liberal hold		Swing	+0.6	

=== Chisholm ===
1987 Australian federal election: Chisholm
Party	Candidate	Votes	%	±%
Liberal	Michael Wooldridge	29,705	46.4	+2.1
Labor	Helen Mayer	28,094	43.9	−1.7
Democrats	Fran Robbins	4,222	6.6	+0.4
National	Edward Wajsbrem	1,101	1.7	+0.6
Unite Australia	Ernest Rodeck	637	1.0	+1.0
Independent	Barry Gration	226	0.4	+0.4
Total formal votes		63,985	95.8	
Informal votes		2,772	4.2	
Turnout		66,757	95.7	
Two-party-preferred result
Liberal	Michael Wooldridge	32,400	50.7	+0.9
Labor	Helen Mayer	31,528	49.3	−0.9
Liberal gain from Labor		Swing	+0.9	

=== Corangamite ===
1987 Australian federal election: Corangamite
Party	Candidate	Votes	%	±%
Liberal	Stewart McArthur	32,341	48.3	+0.4
Labor	Ian Caldwell	27,620	41.2	−0.7
Democrats	Rob Mann	4,225	6.3	+2.8
National	John McDonald	2,813	4.2	+0.9
Total formal votes		66,999	96.4	
Informal votes		2,504	3.6	
Turnout		69,503	95.9	
Two-party-preferred result
Liberal	Stewart McArthur	36,572	54.6	+1.2
Labor	Ian Caldwell	30,411	45.4	−1.2
Liberal hold		Swing	+1.2	

=== Corio ===
1987 Australian federal election: Corio
Party	Candidate	Votes	%	±%
Labor	Gordon Scholes	34,064	54.9	−4.3
Liberal	Patrick Conheady	20,220	32.6	−1.1
Democrats	Greta Pearce	3,775	6.1	+3.1
Independent	Danielle Dixon	2,602	4.2	+4.2
Independent	Tom Davies	1,378	2.2	+2.2
Total formal votes		62,039	94.4	
Informal votes		3,688	5.6	
Turnout		65,727	96.9	
Two-party-preferred result
Labor	Gordon Scholes	39,026	62.9	+0.5
Liberal	Patrick Conheady	23,004	37.1	−0.5
Labor hold		Swing	+0.5	

=== Deakin ===
1987 Australian federal election: Deakin
Party	Candidate	Votes	%	±%
Liberal	Julian Beale	30,665	48.5	+1.7
Labor	Madelyn Myatt	27,884	44.1	−1.1
Democrats	Marcus Bosch	3,992	6.3	+0.2
Unite Australia	Rick Wright	401	0.6	+0.6
Independent	Gil Speirs	267	0.4	+0.4
Total formal votes		63,209	96.0	
Informal votes		2,660	4.0	
Turnout		65,869	96.4	
Two-party-preferred result
Liberal	Julian Beale	32,569	51.5	+0.8
Labor	Madelyn Myatt	30,624	48.5	−0.8
Liberal hold		Swing	+0.8	

=== Dunkley ===
1987 Australian federal election: Dunkley
Party	Candidate	Votes	%	±%
Labor	Bob Chynoweth	28,740	46.7	+0.3
Liberal	Tom Warwick	26,267	42.6	−1.1
Democrats	Robyn Kirby	3,881	6.3	+0.2
Independent	Chris van Lieshout	1,898	3.1	+3.1
Pensioner	Andrew Murray	615	1.0	+1.0
Independent	Les Johnson	193	0.3	+0.3
Total formal votes		61,594	95.6	+3.3
Informal votes		2,804	4.4	−3.3
Turnout		64,398	96.0	
Two-party-preferred result
Labor	Bob Chynoweth	31,837	51.7	+0.6
Liberal	Tom Warwick	29,723	48.3	−0.6
Labor hold		Swing	+0.6	

=== Flinders ===
1987 Australian federal election: Flinders
Party	Candidate	Votes	%	±%
Liberal	Peter Reith	31,737	47.2	+1.8
Labor	Tony Lack	29,469	43.8	−1.3
Democrats	Andrew Suttie	3,655	5.4	+1.1
Pensioner	Jonathan Miln	1,449	2.2	+1.3
Independent	Noel Maud	986	1.5	+1.5
Total formal votes		67,296	95.4	
Informal votes		3,269	4.6	
Turnout		70,565	94.5	
Two-party-preferred result
Liberal	Peter Reith	34,498	51.3	+0.1
Labor	Tony Lack	32,757	48.7	−0.1
Liberal hold		Swing	+0.1	

=== Gellibrand ===
1987 Australian federal election: Gellibrand
Party	Candidate	Votes	%	±%
Labor	Ralph Willis	38,451	64.9	−4.6
Liberal	Tim Warner	14,506	24.5	+0.5
Democrats	Susan Holmes	3,665	6.2	+2.5
Independent	Rosalba Vicari	1,569	2.6	+2.6
Socialist Workers	James Doughney	1,097	1.9	+0.8
Total formal votes		59,288	91.9	
Informal votes		5,245	8.1	
Turnout		64,533	93.4	
Two-party-preferred result
Labor	Ralph Willis	41,804	70.6	−2.8
Liberal	Tim Warner	17,390	29.4	+2.8
Labor hold		Swing	−2.8	

=== Gippsland ===
1987 Australian federal election: Gippsland
Party	Candidate	Votes	%	±%
National	Peter McGauran	29,084	44.3	+3.5
Labor	Zona Child	20,056	30.5	+1.7
Liberal	Grant Pearce	12,384	18.9	−0.8
Democrats	Pierre Forcier	2,785	4.2	+1.2
Independent	Rod Anderson	1,350	2.1	+2.1
Total formal votes		65,659	96.6	
Informal votes		2,294	3.4	
Turnout		67,953	95.3	
Two-party-preferred result
National	Peter McGauran	42,687	65.0	+0.7
Labor	Zona Child	22,958	35.0	−0.7
National hold		Swing	+0.7	

=== Goldstein ===
1987 Australian federal election: Goldstein
Party	Candidate	Votes	%	±%
Liberal	Ian Macphee	35,029	55.4	+3.3
Labor	Murray McInnes	22,343	35.4	−3.0
Democrats	Maureen Boaler	3,654	5.8	+0.7
Democratic Labor	Michael Rowe	1,436	2.3	−0.5
Independent	Tiger Casley	739	1.2	+1.2
Total formal votes		63,201	95.0	
Informal votes		3,295	5.0	
Turnout		66,496	93.5	
Two-party-preferred result
Liberal	Ian Macphee	37,566	59.5	+3.3
Labor	Murray McInnes	25,618	40.5	−3.3
Liberal hold		Swing	+3.3	

=== Henty ===
1987 Australian federal election: Henty
Party	Candidate	Votes	%	±%
Labor	Joan Child	30,695	50.5	−2.4
Liberal	Rudi Michelson	25,138	41.3	+2.2
Democrats	Paul Hegarty	4,992	8.2	+2.9
Total formal votes		60,825	94.5	
Informal votes		3,526	5.5	
Turnout		64,351	94.3	
Two-party-preferred result
Labor	Joan Child	33,301	54.8	−1.9
Liberal	Rudi Michelson	27,496	45.2	+1.9
Labor hold		Swing	−1.9	

=== Higgins ===
1987 Australian federal election: Higgins
Party	Candidate	Votes	%	±%
Liberal	Roger Shipton	36,139	59.0	+2.0
Labor	Barbara Higgins	19,899	32.5	−0.9
Democrats	Clive Jackson	5,188	8.5	+2.7
Total formal votes		61,226	95.9	
Informal votes		2,606	4.1	
Turnout		63,832	93.4	
Two-party-preferred result
Liberal	Roger Shipton	38,328	62.6	+0.5
Labor	Barbara Higgins	22,888	37.4	−0.5
Liberal hold		Swing	+0.5	

=== Holt ===
1987 Australian federal election: Holt
Party	Candidate	Votes	%	±%
Labor	Michael Duffy	32,026	56.1	−2.6
Liberal	Janice Bateman	20,764	36.4	+1.6
Democrats	Geoff Herbert	4,282	7.5	+2.8
Total formal votes		57,072	93.1	
Informal votes		4,200	6.9	
Turnout		61,272	93.7	
Two-party-preferred result
Labor	Michael Duffy	34,489	60.4	−1.8
Liberal	Janice Bateman	22,583	39.6	+1.8
Labor hold		Swing	−1.8	

=== Hotham ===
1987 Australian federal election: Hotham
Party	Candidate	Votes	%	±%
Labor	Lewis Kent	33,035	52.5	−1.0
Liberal	Peter McCall	25,432	40.5	+5.6
Democrats	Len de Koning	4,402	7.0	−1.5
Total formal votes		62,869	93.3	
Informal votes		4,543	6.7	
Turnout		67,412	95.5	
Two-party-preferred result
Labor	Lewis Kent	35,535	56.5	−1.6
Liberal	Peter McCall	27,328	43.5	+1.6
Labor hold		Swing	−1.6	

=== Indi ===
1987 Australian federal election: Indi
Party	Candidate	Votes	%	±%
Liberal	Ewen Cameron	24,844	37.4	+4.1
Labor	Danny Walsh	22,065	33.2	−1.1
National	Philip Pullar	13,435	20.2	−8.1
Independent	Rob Taylor	5,415	8.2	+8.2
Pensioner	Brian Lumsden	665	1.0	+1.0
Total formal votes		66,424	96.1	
Informal votes		2,683	3.9	
Turnout		69,107	95.0	
Two-party-preferred result
Liberal	Ewen Cameron	41,549	62.6	+0.3
Labor	Danny Walsh	24,860	37.4	−0.3
Liberal hold		Swing	+0.3	

=== Isaacs ===
1987 Australian federal election: Isaacs
Party	Candidate	Votes	%	±%
Labor	David Charles	29,325	47.7	−3.2
Liberal	Rod Atkinson	26,448	43.1	+3.0
Democrats	Maxine Aspinall	4,428	7.2	+1.1
National	Bill Buchanan	833	1.4	+0.1
Independent	Linda Ely	395	0.6	+0.6
Total formal votes		61,429	95.5	
Informal votes		2,891	4.5	
Turnout		64,320	95.2	
Two-party-preferred result
Labor	David Charles	32,351	52.7	−1.7
Liberal	Rod Atkinson	29,057	47.3	+1.7
Labor hold		Swing	−1.7	

=== Jagajaga ===
1987 Australian federal election: Jagajaga
Party	Candidate	Votes	%	±%
Labor	Peter Staples	29,698	51.3	−1.7
Liberal	John Pasquarelli	21,479	37.1	−0.1
Democrats	Howard McCallum	5,023	8.7	+3.3
National	Laurie Kirwan	977	1.7	+1.7
Independent	Lynette Manning	757	1.3	+1.3
Total formal votes		57,934	94.7	
Informal votes		3,242	5.3	
Turnout		61,176	95.3	
Two-party-preferred result
Labor	Peter Staples	33,698	58.2	+2.1
Liberal	John Pasquarelli	24,191	41.8	−2.1
Labor hold		Swing	+2.1	

=== Kooyong ===
1987 Australian federal election: Kooyong
Party	Candidate	Votes	%	±%
Liberal	Andrew Peacock	36,608	59.1	+0.3
Labor	Lindsay Woods	19,030	30.7	−2.6
Democrats	Peter Taft	4,593	7.4	+1.9
Unite Australia	Margaret Cole	1,685	2.7	+1.8
Total formal votes		61,916	95.8	
Informal votes		2,709	4.2	
Turnout		64,625	94.4	
Two-party-preferred result
Liberal	Andrew Peacock	39,647	64.0	+1.0
Labor	Lindsay Woods	22,265	36.0	−1.0
Liberal hold		Swing	+1.0	

=== La Trobe ===
1987 Australian federal election: La Trobe
Party	Candidate	Votes	%	±%
Labor	Peter Milton	31,510	50.8	−3.2
Liberal	Bob Charles	24,013	38.7	+2.3
Democrats	John Benton	6,461	10.4	+2.6
Total formal votes		61,984	95.2	
Informal votes		3,121	4.8	
Turnout		65,105	95.7	
Two-party-preferred result
Labor	Peter Milton	35,539	57.3	−1.4
Liberal	Bob Charles	26,439	42.7	+1.4
Labor hold		Swing	−1.4	

=== Lalor ===
1987 Australian federal election: Lalor
Party	Candidate	Votes	%	±%
Labor	Barry Jones	42,087	63.8	−3.4
Liberal	Darren Farquhar	17,966	27.2	+0.1
Democrats	Heather Jeffcoat	5,899	8.9	+4.7
Total formal votes		65,962	93.4	
Informal votes		4,676	6.6	
Turnout		70,628	95.2	
Two-party-preferred result
Labor	Barry Jones	45,824	69.5	−0.5
Liberal	Darren Farquhar	20,118	30.5	+0.5
Labor hold		Swing	−0.5	

=== Mallee ===
1987 Australian federal election: Mallee
Party	Candidate	Votes	%	±%
National	Peter Fisher	31,192	48.0	−5.5
Labor	Linda Freedman	18,461	28.4	+3.3
Liberal	Adrian Kidd	12,151	18.7	+3.4
Independent	Neil Lehmann	3,208	4.9	+4.9
Total formal votes		65,012	96.6	
Informal votes		2,275	3.4	
Turnout		67,287	95.8	
Two-party-preferred result
National	Peter Fisher	45,595	70.1	−1.3
Labor	Linda Freedman	19,414	29.9	+1.3
National hold		Swing	−1.3	

=== Maribyrnong ===
1987 Australian federal election: Maribyrnong
Party	Candidate	Votes	%	±%
Labor	Alan Griffiths	31,502	52.6	−2.0
Liberal	Victor Rudewych	22,505	37.6	+2.3
Democrats	David Mackay	3,940	6.6	+2.3
Democratic Labor	Mark Beshara	1,898	3.2	−1.2
Total formal votes		59,845	93.3	
Informal votes		4,279	6.7	
Turnout		64,124	95.5	
Two-party-preferred result
Labor	Alan Griffiths	34,252	57.2	−3.2
Liberal	Victor Rudewych	25,584	42.8	+3.2
Labor hold		Swing	−3.2	

=== McEwen ===
1987 Australian federal election: McEwen
Party	Candidate	Votes	%	±%
Labor	Peter Cleeland	31,052	48.5	+1.5
Liberal	David Millie	24,021	37.5	+0.7
Democrats	Doug Lorman	4,551	7.1	+0.7
National	Andrew Coller	4,038	6.3	−2.0
Independent	Robert Wilson	369	0.6	+0.6
Total formal votes		64,031	95.8	
Informal votes		2,804	4.2	
Turnout		66,835	96.2	
Two-party-preferred result
Labor	Peter Cleeland	34,605	54.1	+2.0
Liberal	David Millie	29,397	45.9	−2.0
Labor hold		Swing	+2.0	

=== McMillan ===
1987 Australian federal election: McMillan
Party	Candidate	Votes	%	±%
Labor	Barry Cunningham	30,610	48.9	−4.6
Liberal	John Kiely	19,846	31.7	−1.5
National	Pat O'Brien	7,544	12.1	+6.0
Democrats	Ross Ollquist	3,319	5.3	+1.1
Independent	Anne Lorraine	833	1.3	+1.3
Independent	Thomas Walsh	404	0.6	+0.6
Total formal votes		62,556	96.2	
Informal votes		2,466	3.8	
Turnout		65,022	95.6	
Two-party-preferred result
Labor	Barry Cunningham	33,949	54.3	−3.8
Liberal	John Kiely	28,555	45.7	+3.8
Labor hold		Swing	−3.8	

=== Melbourne ===
1987 Australian federal election: Melbourne
Party	Candidate	Votes	%	±%
Labor	Gerry Hand	35,873	62.6	−2.5
Liberal	Frank Randle	15,267	26.7	+4.5
Democrats	Peter La Franchi	5,374	9.4	+2.3
Imperial British	James Ferrari	757	1.3	−2.3
Total formal votes		57,271	91.9	
Informal votes		5,031	8.1	
Turnout		62,301	90.1	
Two-party-preferred result
Labor	Gerry Hand	39,705	69.4	−0.6
Liberal	Frank Randle	17,526	30.6	+0.6
Labor hold		Swing	−0.6	

=== Melbourne Ports ===
1987 Australian federal election: Melbourne Ports
Party	Candidate	Votes	%	±%
Labor	Clyde Holding	29,831	50.1	−7.0
Liberal	Allan Paull	20,683	34.7	+3.9
Democrats	Di Bretherton	5,568	9.3	+3.5
Independent	Alan Brown	3,483	5.9	+5.9
Total formal votes		59,565	93.6	
Informal votes		4,039	6.4	
Turnout		63,604	87.9	
Two-party-preferred result
Labor	Clyde Holding	35,643	59.9	−4.3
Liberal	Allan Paull	23,831	40.1	+4.3
Labor hold		Swing	−4.3	

=== Menzies ===
1987 Australian federal election: Menzies
Party	Candidate	Votes	%	±%
Liberal	Neil Brown	32,401	53.0	+2.4
Labor	Ivana Csar	22,505	36.8	−4.0
Democrats	Marjorie White	5,266	8.6	+2.3
Unite Australia	Bruce Plain	972	1.6	+1.6
Total formal votes		61,144	95.3	
Informal votes		2,999	4.7	
Turnout		64,143	95.1	
Two-party-preferred result
Liberal	Neil Brown	35,049	57.3	+1.6
Labor	Ivana Csar	26,085	42.7	−1.6
Liberal hold		Swing	+1.6	

=== Murray ===
1987 Australian federal election: Murray
Party	Candidate	Votes	%	±%
National	Bruce Lloyd	32,738	50.8	−7.5
Labor	Mark Anderson	16,919	26.3	+1.7
Liberal	Brendan Norden	9,545	14.8	+2.6
Democrats	Ralph Linford	2,631	4.1	+0.7
Independent	John Hargreaves	2,574	4.0	+4.0
Total formal votes		64,407	95.8	
Informal votes		2,796	4.2	
Turnout		67,203	95.8	
Two-party-preferred result
National	Bruce Lloyd	45,290	70.4	−2.7
Labor	Mark Anderson	19,074	29.6	+2.7
National hold		Swing	−2.7	

=== Scullin ===
1987 Australian federal election: Scullin
Party	Candidate	Votes	%	±%
Labor	Harry Jenkins	37,158	68.7	−2.8
Liberal	Mike Kabos	12,991	24.0	+5.4
Democrats	Joe Privitelli	3,900	7.2	+0.5
Total formal votes		54,049	90.6	
Informal votes		5,581	9.4	
Turnout		59,630	95.4	
Two-party-preferred result
Labor	Harry Jenkins	39,539	73.2	−4.4
Liberal	Mike Kabos	14,497	26.8	+4.4
Labor hold		Swing	−4.4	

=== Streeton ===
1987 Australian federal election: Streeton
Party	Candidate	Votes	%	±%
Labor	Tony Lamb	29,038	46.7	−2.3
Liberal	Russell Broadbent	26,288	42.3	+3.1
Democrats	Rika Mason	5,063	8.1	+0.7
National	Ken Trembath	998	1.6	−1.2
Unite Australia	Tessa Cunningham	822	1.3	+1.3
Total formal votes		62,209	96.3	
Informal votes		2,393	3.7	
Turnout		64,602	95.5	
Two-party-preferred result
Labor	Tony Lamb	32,911	52.9	−0.4
Liberal	Russell Broadbent	29,275	47.1	+0.4
Labor hold		Swing	−0.4	

=== Wannon ===
1987 Australian federal election: Wannon
Party	Candidate	Votes	%	±%
Liberal	David Hawker	38,838	60.2	+1.8
Labor	Kevin Watt	21,478	33.3	+1.3
Democrats	Julie Jennings	4,235	6.6	+3.9
Total formal votes		64,551	97.0	
Informal votes		2,019	3.0	
Turnout		66,570	96.8	
Two-party-preferred result
Liberal	David Hawker	40,718	63.1	−2.3
Labor	Kevin Watt	23,829	36.9	+2.3
Liberal hold		Swing	−2.3	

=== Wills ===
1987 Australian federal election: Wills
Party	Candidate	Votes	%	±%
Labor	Bob Hawke	35,849	61.8	−4.7
Liberal	Olga Venables	15,318	26.4	+3.0
Democrats	Ken Eley	3,729	6.4	+2.4
Independent	Fast Bucks	1,400	2.4	+2.4
Independent	Lyn Teather	1,092	1.9	+1.9
Independent	Ian Sykes	650	1.1	+1.1
Total formal votes		58,038	91.4	
Informal votes		5,480	8.6	
Turnout		63,518	93.3	
Two-party-preferred result
Labor	Bob Hawke	40,519	69.9	−0.4
Liberal	Olga Venables	17,432	30.1	+0.4
Labor hold		Swing	−0.4	

== See also ==
- Results of the 1987 Australian federal election (House of Representatives)
- Members of the Australian House of Representatives, 1987–1990
