= Results of the 1990 Australian federal election in Victoria =

1990 Australian federal election (Victoria)
- 24 March 1990

All 38 Victorian seats in the Australian House of Representatives and 6 seats in the Australian Senate
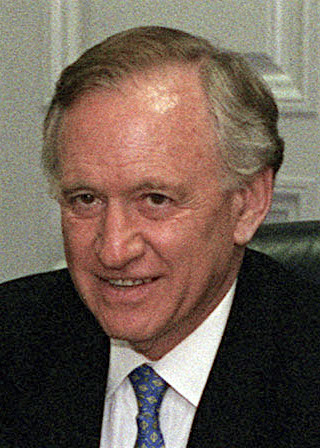

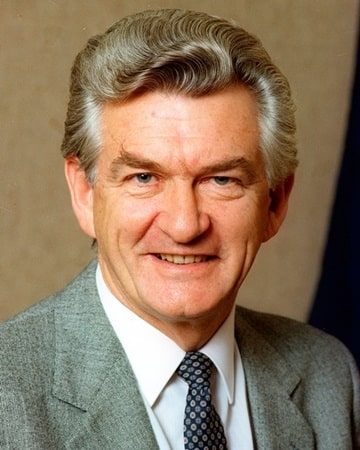
	First party	Second party
Leader	Andrew Peacock	Bob Hawke
Party	Liberal/National coalition	Labor
Last election	15	24 seats
Seats won	24 seats	14 seats
Seat change	▲9	▼10
Popular vote	1,172,809	951,674
Percentage	45.7%	37.1%
Swing	▲1.4	▼9.8
TPP	52.5%	47.5%
TPP swing	▲5.1	▼5.1

This is a list of electoral division results for the Australian 1990 federal election in the state of Victoria.

== Overall results ==
Turnout 95.7% (CV) — Informal 3.5%
Party	Votes	%	Swing	Seats	Change
Liberal	1,018,740	39.7	+1.7	21	▲9
National	154,069	6.0	−0.3	3	Steady
Liberal/National Coalition	1,172,809	45.7	+1.4	24	▲9
Labor	951,674	37.1	−9.8	14	▼10
Democrats	319,149	12.43	+5.7		
Independents (Note: The unregistered Natural Law Party has been included with the independents.)	55,357	2.16	−4.3		
Call to Australia	52,554	2.05			
Democratic Socialist	6,836	0.27			
Citizens Electoral Council	3,524	0.14			
Democratic Labor	2,564	0.10	−0.04		
Socialist	918	0.04			
Pensioner	910	0.04			
AAFI	835	0.03			
Total	2,567,130			38	▼1
Two-party-preferred vote
Liberal/National Coalition	1,347,048	52.54	+5.1	24	▲9
Labor	1,216,633	47.46	−5.1	14	▼10
Invalid/blank votes	94,334	3.54	−1.7		
Turnout	2,661,464	95.68			
Registered voters	2,781,547				
Source: Federal Elections 1990

== Results by division ==
=== Aston ===
1990 Australian federal election: Aston
Party	Candidate	Votes	%	±%
Liberal	Peter Nugent	32,968	48.4	+5.6
Labor	John Saunderson	24,738	36.3	−11.1
Democrats	Damian Wise	8,802	12.9	+4.8
Call to Australia	Michael Ryan	1,643	2.4	+2.4
Total formal votes		68,151	97.0	
Informal votes		2,085	3.0	
Turnout		70,236	96.8	
Two-party-preferred result
Liberal	Peter Nugent	37,204	54.6	+7.2
Labor	John Saunderson	30,901	45.4	−7.2
Liberal gain from Labor		Swing	+7.2	

=== Ballarat ===
1990 Australian federal election: Ballarat
Party	Candidate	Votes	%	±%
Liberal	Michael Ronaldson	31,273	46.3	+10.5
Labor	John Mildren	27,609	40.8	−6.5
Democrats	Bill Scetrine	5,654	8.4	+4.4
Call to Australia	Jodie Rickard	2,311	3.4	+3.4
Independent	Greg Mays	536	0.8	+0.8
Independent	George Helon	212	0.3	+0.3
Total formal votes		67,595	97.8	
Informal votes		1,541	2.2	
Turnout		69,136	96.9	
Two-party-preferred result
Liberal	Michael Ronaldson	35,043	51.9	+4.0
Labor	John Mildren	32,506	48.1	−4.0
Liberal gain from Labor		Swing	+4.0	

=== Batman ===
1990 Australian federal election: Batman
Party	Candidate	Votes	%	±%
Labor	Brian Howe	34,506	51.8	−12.2
Liberal	Ray Ellis	18,274	27.5	+3.2
Democrats	George Gogas	8,574	12.9	+3.2
Call to Australia	Alan Watts	3,950	5.9	+5.9
Democratic Socialist	Nigel D'Souza	1,250	1.9	+1.9
Total formal votes		66,554	93.7	
Informal votes		4,507	6.3	
Turnout		71,061	94.3	
Two-party-preferred result
Labor	Brian Howe	44,754	67.4	−5.4
Liberal	Ray Ellis	21,645	32.6	+5.4
Labor hold		Swing	−5.4	

=== Bendigo ===
1990 Australian federal election: Bendigo
Party	Candidate	Votes	%	±%
Labor	John Brumby	28,197	40.5	−8.6
Liberal	Bruce Reid	23,592	33.9	+9.5
National	Denis English	9,330	13.4	−8.7
Democrats	Ian Keeling	5,566	8.0	4.0
Call to Australia	Vic Upson	1,578	2.3	+2.3
Independent	Joan Ansell	880	1.3	+1.3
Independent	Russell Castley	420	0.6	+0.6
Total formal votes		69,563	97.6	
Informal votes		1,684	2.4	
Turnout		71,247	96.7	
Two-party-preferred result
Liberal	Bruce Reid	35,539	51.1	+5.1
Labor	John Brumby	33,949	48.9	−5.1
Liberal gain from Labor		Swing	+5.1	

=== Bruce ===
1990 Australian federal election: Bruce
Party	Candidate	Votes	%	±%
Liberal	Julian Beale	36,171	52.0	+2.1
Labor	Philip Cottier	21,794	31.3	−9.3
Democrats	Geoff Herbert	9,431	13.6	+5.6
Call to Australia	Peter Olney	2,195	3.2	+3.2
Total formal votes		69,591	96.9	
Informal votes		2,203	3.1	
Turnout		71,794	97.0	
Two-party-preferred result
Liberal	Julian Beale	41,268	59.3	+4.9
Labor	Philip Cottier	28,285	40.7	−4.9
Liberal hold		Swing	+4.9	

=== Burke ===
1990 Australian federal election: Burke
Party	Candidate	Votes	%	±%
Labor	Neil O'Keefe	27,102	42.9	−11.1
Liberal	Ian Lindsay	26,114	41.3	+7.5
Democrats	Patrick McCurry	9,996	15.8	+8.6
Total formal votes		63,212	96.1	
Informal votes		2,564	3.9	
Turnout		65,776	95.8	
Two-party-preferred result
Labor	Neil O'Keefe	33,684	53.3	−5.8
Liberal	Ian Lindsay	29,505	46.7	+5.8
Labor hold		Swing	−5.8	

=== Calwell ===
1990 Australian federal election: Calwell
Party	Candidate	Votes	%	±%
Labor	Andrew Theophanous	29,466	45.5	−12.6
Liberal	Dianne Livett	21,232	32.8	+2.7
Democrats	Doug Lorman	7,791	12.0	+2.1
Independent	Jack Culpin	4,493	6.9	+6.9
Call to Australia	Rob Lukanic	1,751	2.7	+2.7
Total formal votes		64,733	94.4	
Informal votes		3,815	5.6	
Turnout		68,548	95.2	
Two-party-preferred result
Labor	Andrew Theophanous	36,875	57.1	−8.5
Liberal	Dianne Livett	27,744	42.9	+8.5
Labor hold		Swing	−8.5	

=== Casey ===
1990 Australian federal election: Casey
Party	Candidate	Votes	%	±%
Liberal	Bob Halverson	33,006	48.5	+2.7
Labor	Jon Linehan	20,270	29.8	−14.2
Democrats	Paul Rees	10,124	14.9	+7.1
Call to Australia	John Dubbeld	3,718	5.5	+5.5
Independent	Earle Keegel	531	0.8	+0.8
Independent	Basil Smith	361	0.5	+0.5
Total formal votes		68,010	97.3	
Informal votes		1,909	2.7	
Turnout		69,919	96.1	
Two-party-preferred result
Liberal	Bob Halverson	39,540	58.2	+7.9
Labor	Jon Linehan	28,357	41.8	−7.9
Liberal hold		Swing	+7.9	

=== Chisholm ===
1990 Australian federal election: Chisholm
Party	Candidate	Votes	%	±%
Liberal	Michael Wooldridge	34,660	48.5	+2.4
Labor	Helen Mayer	24,437	34.2	−10.0
Democrats	Trudi Brunton	9,576	13.4	+6.8
Call to Australia	Adrian Stagg	2,832	4.0	+4.0
Total formal votes		71,505	97.5	
Informal votes		1,861	2.5	
Turnout		73,366	96.1	
Two-party-preferred result
Liberal	Michael Wooldridge	40,230	56.3	+5.9
Labor	Helen Mayer	31,239	43.7	−5.9
Liberal hold		Swing	+5.9	

=== Corangamite ===
1990 Australian federal election: Corangamite
Party	Candidate	Votes	%	±%
Liberal	Stewart McArthur	36,516	54.2	+4.8
Labor	Ian Caldwell	20,582	30.6	−9.5
Democrats	Rob Mann	7,399	11.0	+4.7
Call to Australia	John Andrews	2,293	3.4	+3.4
Independent	Bruce Wilson	549	0.8	+0.8
Total formal votes		67,339	97.7	
Informal votes		1,595	2.3	
Turnout		68,934	96.4	
Two-party-preferred result
Liberal	Stewart McArthur	40,867	60.8	+5.1
Labor	Ian Caldwell	26,356	39.2	−5.1
Liberal hold		Swing	+5.1	

=== Corinella ===
1990 Australian federal election: Corinella
Party	Candidate	Votes	%	±%
Liberal	Russell Broadbent	28,991	44.3	+3.1
Labor	Lewis Kent	25,057	38.3	−12.6
Democrats	Mike Burns	7,802	11.9	+5.7
Citizens Electoral Council	George Moran	3,524	5.4	+5.4
Total formal votes		65,374	96.5	
Informal votes		2,391	3.5	
Turnout		67,765	95.9	
Two-party-preferred result
Liberal	Russell Broadbent	33,134	50.7	+6.0
Labor	Lewis Kent	32,181	49.3	−6.0
Liberal notional gain from Labor		Swing	+6.0	

=== Corio ===
1990 Australian federal election: Corio
Party	Candidate	Votes	%	±%
Labor	Gordon Scholes	30,419	43.9	−8.2
Liberal	Adrienne Edgar	26,534	38.3	+2.9
Democrats	Donal Storey	7,153	10.3	+4.2
Call to Australia	Ian Winter	2,555	3.7	+3.7
Independent	Horst Pfeifer	1,978	2.9	+2.9
Independent	Bruce Tanner	594	0.9	+0.9
Total formal votes		69,233	96.2	
Informal votes		2,712	3.8	
Turnout		71,945	95.8	
Two-party-preferred result
Labor	Gordon Scholes	37,428	54.2	−5.9
Liberal	Adrienne Edgar	31,606	45.8	+5.9
Labor hold		Swing	−5.9	

=== Deakin ===
1990 Australian federal election: Deakin
Party	Candidate	Votes	%	±%
Liberal	Ken Aldred	31,212	44.7	−0.4
Labor	Tony Lamb	23,955	34.3	−13.2
Democrats	Louise Enders	11,652	16.7	+10.4
Call to Australia	Rodger Nardi	2,591	3.7	+3.7
Democratic Socialist	Bronwen Beechey	413	0.6	+0.6
Total formal votes		69,823	97.6	
Informal votes		1,684	2.4	
Turnout		71,507	96.6	
Two-party-preferred result
Liberal	Ken Aldred	36,505	52.4	+4.3
Labor	Tony Lamb	33,222	47.6	−4.3
Liberal gain from Labor		Swing	+4.3	

=== Dunkley ===
1990 Australian federal election: Dunkley
Party	Candidate	Votes	%	±%
Liberal	Frank Ford	28,759	43.8	+5.1
Labor	Bob Chynoweth	24,724	37.6	−13.0
Democrats	Peter Lindemann	8,695	13.2	+6.9
Independent	Peter Seitanidis	1,458	2.2	+2.2
Pensioner	Keith Edwards	910	1.4	+1.4
Call to Australia	Arthur Comer	554	0.8	+0.8
Independent	Mike Toldy	297	0.5	+0.5
Independent	Len Cosmavich	294	0.4	+0.4
Total formal votes		65,691	96.2	+0.5
Informal votes		2,625	3.8	−0.5
Turnout		68,316	95.8	
Two-party-preferred result
Liberal	Frank Ford	33,582	51.2	+6.8
Labor	Bob Chynoweth	32,012	48.8	−6.8
Liberal gain from Labor		Swing	+6.8	

=== Flinders ===
1990 Australian federal election: Flinders
Party	Candidate	Votes	%	±%
Liberal	Peter Reith	32,853	50.9	+4.3
Labor	Tony Moore	22,363	34.7	−9.7
Democrats	Nance Jaboor	8,516	13.2	+7.8
Independent	David Gilbert	793	1.2	+1.2
Total formal votes		64,525	97.4	
Informal votes		1,739	2.6	
Turnout		66,264	96.0	
Two-party-preferred result
Liberal	Peter Reith	35,606	55.2	+4.5
Labor	Tony Moore	28,860	44.8	−4.5
Liberal hold		Swing	+4.5	

=== Gellibrand ===
1990 Australian federal election: Gellibrand
Party	Candidate	Votes	%	±%
Labor	Ralph Willis	36,267	54.6	−10.3
Liberal	Tim Warner	17,631	26.5	+2.0
Democrats	Frank Fichera	7,023	10.6	+4.4
Independent	Richard Phillips	2,487	3.7	+3.7
Independent	Don Veitch	1,593	2.4	+2.4
Democratic Socialist	Garry Walters	1,478	2.2	+2.2
Total formal votes		66,479	93.5	
Informal votes		4,649	6.5	
Turnout		71,128	94.7	
Two-party-preferred result
Labor	Ralph Willis	45,444	68.5	−2.1
Liberal	Tim Warner	20,888	31.5	+2.1
Labor hold		Swing	−2.1	

=== Gippsland ===
1990 Australian federal election: Gippsland
Party	Candidate	Votes	%	±%
National	Peter McGauran	41,862	60.7	+16.4
Labor	Merv Bundle	15,841	23.0	−7.5
Democrats	Grace McCaughey	7,201	10.4	+6.2
Independent	Ben Buckley	2,382	3.5	+3.5
Call to Australia	Robert Watson	1,684	2.4	+2.4
Total formal votes		68,970	97.7	
Informal votes		1,631	2.3	
Turnout		70,601	95.7	
Two-party-preferred result
National	Peter McGauran	47,507	68.9	+3.9
Labor	Merv Bundle	21,406	31.1	−3.9
National hold		Swing	+3.9	

=== Goldstein ===
1990 Australian federal election: Goldstein
Party	Candidate	Votes	%	±%
Liberal	David Kemp	33,468	47.3	−3.5
Labor	Michael Danby	21,138	29.8	−10.2
Democrats	Di Bretherton	9,318	13.2	+7.4
Independent	Diana Wolowski	4,751	6.7	+6.7
Democratic Socialist	Adrienne Barrett	1,006	1.4	+1.4
Call to Australia	Phillip McGibbony	758	1.1	+1.1
Independent	John Casley	222	0.3	+0.3
Independent	Peter Kormoczy	160	0.2	+0.2
Total formal votes		70,821	96.3	
Informal votes		2,728	3.7	
Turnout		73,549	95.4	
Two-party-preferred result
Liberal	David Kemp	39,575	56.0	−1.1
Labor	Michael Danby	31,145	44.0	+1.1
Liberal hold		Swing	−1.1	

=== Higgins ===
1990 Australian federal election: Higgins
Party	Candidate	Votes	%	±%
Liberal	Peter Costello	38,594	56.3	+2.2
Labor	Laurie Walsh	18,497	27.0	−10.4
Democrats	Clive Jackson	10,826	15.8	+7.3
Call to Australia	Neil Baluch	670	1.0	+1.0
Total formal votes		68,587	97.0	
Informal votes		2,116	3.0	
Turnout		70,703	94.4	
Two-party-preferred result
Liberal	Peter Costello	42,323	61.8	+4.0
Labor	Laurie Walsh	26,131	38.2	−4.0
Liberal hold		Swing	+4.0	

=== Holt ===
1990 Australian federal election: Holt
Party	Candidate	Votes	%	±%
Labor	Michael Duffy	27,485	44.8	−11.9
Liberal	Mario Dodic	21,099	34.4	−1.4
Democrats	Irmgard Westphal	7,273	11.9	+4.4
Call to Australia	Lynne Dickson	5,458	8.9	+8.9
Total formal votes		61,315	95.2	
Informal votes		3,091	4.8	
Turnout		64,406	95.2	
Two-party-preferred result
Labor	Michael Duffy	34,882	56.9	−4.1
Liberal	Mario Dodic	26,372	43.1	+4.1
Labor hold		Swing	−4.1	

=== Hotham ===
1990 Australian federal election: Hotham
Party	Candidate	Votes	%	±%
Labor	Simon Crean	29,570	44.1	−10.5
Liberal	Erdem Aydin	24,278	36.2	−2.2
Democrats	Phillip Anderson	7,388	11.0	+4.0
Independent	Vincent Alfonso	3,025	4.5	+4.5
Call to Australia	Daryl Esmore	1,874	2.8	+2.8
Socialist	Peter Stamatopoulos	918	1.4	+1.4
Total formal votes		67,053	95.2	
Informal votes		3,410	4.8	
Turnout		70,463	95.3	
Two-party-preferred result
Labor	Simon Crean	36,309	54.2	−4.5
Liberal	Erdem Aydin	30,668	45.8	+4.5
Labor hold		Swing	−4.5	

=== Indi ===
1990 Australian federal election: Indi
Party	Candidate	Votes	%	±%
Liberal	Ewen Cameron	33,483	50.1	+12.8
Labor	John Dennis	16,561	24.8	−8.5
Independent	Barry Tattersall	9,890	14.8	+14.8
Democrats	Ian Deegan	6,844	10.2	+10.2
Total formal votes		66,778	97.7	
Informal votes		1,596	2.3	
Turnout		68,374	95.6	
Two-party-preferred result
Liberal	Ewen Cameron	42,824	64.2	+1.7
Labor	John Dennis	23,880	35.8	−1.7
Liberal hold		Swing	+1.7	

=== Isaacs ===
1990 Australian federal election: Isaacs
Party	Candidate	Votes	%	±%
Liberal	Rod Atkinson	35,160	50.5	+4.5
Labor	Jim Ensor	23,613	33.9	−10.9
Democrats	Darren Koch	10,874	15.6	+8.4
Total formal votes		69,647	97.0	
Informal votes		2,173	3.0	
Turnout		71,820	95.9	
Two-party-preferred result
Liberal	Rod Atkinson	38,775	55.7	+5.5
Labor	Jim Ensor	30,806	44.3	−5.5
Liberal notional hold		Swing	+5.5	

=== Jagajaga ===
1990 Australian federal election: Jagajaga
Party	Candidate	Votes	%	±%
Liberal	Fred Garrett	26,513	40.4	+3.3
Labor	Peter Staples	26,510	40.4	−10.9
Democrats	Howard McCallum	10,208	15.6	+6.9
Call to Australia	Colin Arnold	1,647	2.5	+2.5
Natural Law	Robert Morris	748	1.1	+1.1
Total formal votes		65,626	97.0	
Informal votes		2,009	3.0	
Turnout		67,635	95.9	
Two-party-preferred result
Labor	Peter Staples	34,484	52.6	−5.6
Liberal	Fred Garrett	31,029	47.4	+5.6
Labor hold		Swing	−5.6	

=== Kooyong ===
1990 Australian federal election: Kooyong
Party	Candidate	Votes	%	±%
Liberal	Andrew Peacock	39,123	58.0	−1.1
Labor	Eugene O'Sullivan	15,391	22.8	−7.9
Democrats	Jill Leisegang	9,302	13.8	+6.4
Independent	Tim Ferguson	2,471	3.7	+3.7
AAFI	Arthur Burns	835	1.2	+1.2
Imperial British	David Greagg	292	0.4	+0.4
Total formal votes		67,414	97.2	
Informal votes		1,937	2.8	
Turnout		69,351	94.9	
Two-party-preferred result
Liberal	Andrew Peacock	43,608	64.8	+0.8
Labor	Eugene O'Sullivan	23,682	35.2	−0.8
Liberal hold		Swing	+0.8	

=== La Trobe ===
1990 Australian federal election: La Trobe
Party	Candidate	Votes	%	±%
Liberal	Bob Charles	29,805	43.7	+1.9
Labor	Peter Milton	23,720	34.8	−12.9
Democrats	Greta Jungwirth	12,246	17.9	+7.5
Call to Australia	Teresa Kemp	2,468	3.6	+3.6
Total formal votes		68,239	97.6	
Informal votes		1,690	2.4	
Turnout		69,929	96.8	
Two-party-preferred result
Liberal	Bob Charles	34,980	51.4	+5.6
Labor	Peter Milton	33,138	48.6	−5.6
Liberal gain from Labor		Swing	+5.6	

=== Lalor ===
1990 Australian federal election: Lalor
Party	Candidate	Votes	%	±%
Labor	Barry Jones	30,879	48.0	−15.8
Liberal	Rae Medlock	20,367	31.7	+4.5
Democrats	George Demetriou	6,455	10.0	+1.1
Independent	Peter Ryan	4,685	7.3	+7.3
Call to Australia	Ron Moffett	1,908	3.0	+3.0
Total formal votes		64,294	96.0	
Informal votes		2,701	4.0	
Turnout		66,995	96.4	
Two-party-preferred result
Labor	Barry Jones	37,832	59.0	−10.5
Liberal	Rae Medlock	26,321	41.0	+10.5
Labor hold		Swing	−10.5	

=== Mallee ===
1990 Australian federal election: Mallee
Party	Candidate	Votes	%	±%
National	Peter Fisher	49,618	69.3	+21.3
Labor	Peter Mitchell	15,952	22.3	−6.1
Democrats	Ian McCracken	6,006	8.4	+8.4
Total formal votes		71,576	97.7	
Informal votes		1,706	2.3	
Turnout		73,282	96.2	
Two-party-preferred result
National	Peter Fisher	52,835	73.8	+3.7
Labor	Peter Mitchell	18,728	26.2	−3.7
National hold		Swing	+3.7	

=== Maribyrnong ===
1990 Australian federal election: Maribyrnong
Party	Candidate	Votes	%	±%
Labor	Alan Griffiths	32,235	48.6	−11.4
Liberal	Victor Rudewych	25,419	38.4	+8.2
Democrats	Frances McKay	8,632	13.0	+6.4
Total formal votes		66,277	93.9	
Informal votes		4,268	6.1	
Turnout		70,545	95.8	
Two-party-preferred result
Labor	Alan Griffiths	37,894	57.2	−7.4
Liberal	Victor Rudewych	28,344	42.8	+7.4
Labor hold		Swing	−7.4	

=== McEwen ===
1990 Australian federal election: McEwen
Party	Candidate	Votes	%	±%
Liberal	Fran Bailey	31,323	46.8	+7.1
Labor	Peter Cleeland	25,610	38.3	−8.0
Democrats	Russell Dawes	6,928	10.4	+3.3
Call to Australia	Win Wise	1,630	2.4	+2.4
Independent	Maurie Smith	1,381	2.1	+2.1
Total formal votes		66,872	97.2	
Informal votes		1,894	2.8	
Turnout		68,766	95.7	
Two-party-preferred result
Liberal	Fran Bailey	35,543	53.2	+6.1
Labor	Peter Cleeland	31,256	46.8	−6.1
Liberal gain from Labor		Swing	+6.1	

=== McMillan ===
1990 Australian federal election: McMillan
Party	Candidate	Votes	%	±%
Liberal	John Riggall	27,224	38.3	+5.3
Labor	Barry Cunningham	26,903	37.9	−9.7
Democrats	Ross Ollquist	7,247	10.2	+4.9
National	Jillian Petersen	6,358	9.0	−3.1
Call to Australia	Michael Slaughter	2,726	3.8	+3.8
Independent	Glen Mann	544	0.8	+0.8
Total formal votes		71,002	97.3	
Informal votes		1,976	2.7	
Turnout		72,978	96.4	
Two-party-preferred result
Liberal	John Riggall	38,576	54.4	+7.4
Labor	Barry Cunningham	32,281	45.6	−7.4
Liberal gain from Labor		Swing	+7.4	

=== Melbourne ===
1990 Australian federal election: Melbourne
Party	Candidate	Votes	%	±%
Labor	Gerry Hand	33,790	51.3	−11.3
Liberal	Rodger Gully	17,078	25.9	−0.8
Democrats	Geoff Mosley	11,775	17.9	+8.5
Independent	Steve Florin	1,643	2.5	+2.5
Democratic Socialist	Melanie Sjoberg	1,125	1.7	+1.7
Imperial British	Jim Ferrari	411	0.6	−0.7
Total formal votes		65,822	94.7	
Informal votes		3,698	5.3	
Turnout		69,520	91.9	
Two-party-preferred result
Labor	Gerry Hand	44,306	67.5	−1.9
Liberal	Rodger Gully	21,358	32.5	+1.9
Labor hold		Swing	−1.9	

=== Melbourne Ports ===
1990 Australian federal election: Melbourne Ports
Party	Candidate	Votes	%	±%
Liberal	Allan Paull	29,032	43.6	+2.9
Labor	Clyde Holding	26,335	39.6	−4.5
Democrats	David Collyer	10,327	15.5	+6.2
Democratic Socialist	Greg Loats	886	1.3	+1.3
Total formal votes		66,580	96.5	
Informal votes		2,399	3.5	
Turnout		68,979	93.6	
Two-party-preferred result
Labor	Clyde Holding	34,594	52.1	−1.8
Liberal	Allan Paull	31,872	47.9	+1.8
Labor hold		Swing	−1.8	

=== Menzies ===
1990 Australian federal election: Menzies
Party	Candidate	Votes	%	±%
Liberal	Neil Brown	38,844	58.4	+3.4
Labor	Ivana Csar	18,521	27.9	−6.9
Democrats	Elizabeth Piper-Johnson	7,710	11.6	+3.0
Call to Australia	Ron Suter	1,384	2.1	+2.1
Total formal votes		66,459	96.9	
Informal votes		2,094	3.1	
Turnout		68,553	96.6	
Two-party-preferred result
Liberal	Neil Brown	42,684	64.3	+5.0
Labor	Ivana Csar	23,742	35.7	−5.0
Liberal hold		Swing	+5.0	

=== Murray ===
1990 Australian federal election: Murray
Party	Candidate	Votes	%	±%
National	Bruce Lloyd	46,901	66.6	+15.8
Labor	Frank Purcell	14,808	21.0	−5.3
Democrats	Barbara Leavesley	6,453	9.2	+5.1
Independent	Anne Adams	2,250	3.2	+3.2
Total formal votes		70,412	97.4	
Informal votes		1,852	2.6	
Turnout		72,264	96.7	
Two-party-preferred result
National	Bruce Lloyd	51,568	73.3	+2.9
Labor	Frank Purcell	18,812	26.7	−2.9
National hold		Swing	+2.9	

=== Scullin ===
1990 Australian federal election: Scullin
Party	Candidate	Votes	%	±%
Labor	Harry Jenkins	32,046	47.9	−17.2
Liberal	Wayne Phillips	23,952	35.8	+8.2
Democrats	Malcolm Brown	9,537	14.2	+7.0
Independent	Steve Pollock	723	1.1	+1.1
Independent	Angelo Iacono	682	1.0	+1.0
Total formal votes		66,940	94.9	
Informal votes		3,578	5.1	
Turnout		70,518	96.3	
Two-party-preferred result
Labor	Harry Jenkins	39,679	59.4	−10.2
Liberal	Wayne Phillips	27,139	40.6	+10.2
Labor hold		Swing	−10.2	

=== Wannon ===
1990 Australian federal election: Wannon
Party	Candidate	Votes	%	±%
Liberal	David Hawker	41,104	57.0	+1.6
Labor	Phillip Sawyer	22,187	30.8	−4.1
Democrats	Allan Thompson	6,441	8.9	+2.3
Call to Australia	Terry Winter	2,376	3.3	+3.3
Total formal votes		72,108	97.7	
Informal votes		1,682	2.3	
Turnout		73,790	96.6	
Two-party-preferred result
Liberal	David Hawker	45,125	62.7	+1.2
Labor	Phillip Sawyer	26,885	37.3	−1.2
Liberal hold		Swing	+1.2	

=== Wills ===
1990 Australian federal election: Wills
Party	Candidate	Votes	%	±%
Labor	Bob Hawke	32,596	48.7	−9.3
Liberal	John Delacretaz	23,088	34.5	+4.3
Democrats	Philip Mendes	6,413	9.6	+3.2
Democratic Labor	Mark Beshara	2,564	3.8	+3.8
Independent	Ian Sykes	986	1.5	+0.4
Democratic Socialist	Lali Chelliah	678	1.0	+1.0
Imperial British	Cecil G. Murgatroyd	319	0.5	+0.5
Independent	Marc Aussie-Stone	316	0.5	+0.5
Total formal votes		66,960	93.6	
Informal votes		4,541	6.4	
Turnout		71,501	94.3	
Two-party-preferred result
Labor	Bob Hawke	38,708	57.9	−8.2
Liberal	John Delacretaz	28,116	42.1	+8.2
Labor hold		Swing	−8.2	

== See also ==
- Results of the 1990 Australian federal election (House of Representatives)
- Members of the Australian House of Representatives, 1990–1993
