= Results of the 1993 Australian federal election in Victoria =

1993 Australian federal election (Victoria)
- 13 March 1993

All 38 Victorian seats in the Australian House of Representatives and 6 seats in the Australian Senate

	First party	Second party
Leader	Paul Keating	John Hewson
Party	Labor	Liberal/National coalition
Last election	14 seats	24
Seats won	17 seats	20 seats
Seat change	▲3	▼4
Popular vote	1,273,974	1,240,435
Percentage	45.2%	45.2%
Swing	▲9.4	▼0.5
TPP	51.80%	48.20%
TPP swing	▲4.34	▼4.34

This is a list of electoral division results for the Australian 1993 federal election in the state of Victoria.

== Overall results ==
Turnout 96.3% (CV) — Informal 2.8%
Party	Votes	%	Swing	Seats	Change
Liberal	1,102,965	40.21	+0.53	17	▼4
National	137,470	5.01	−0.99	3	Steady
Liberal/National Coalition	1,240,435	45.22	−0.46	20	▼4
Labor	1,273,974	46.45	+9.38	17	▲3
Democrats	101,185	3.69	−8.74		
Independents	75,652	2.76		1	Steady
Natural Law	31,529	1.15			
Call to Australia	13,289	0.48			
Greens	3,317	0.12			
AAFI	1,855	0.07			
Citizens Electoral Council	1,027	0.04			
Independent EFF	552	0.02			
Total	2,742,815			38	
Two-party-preferred vote
Labor	1,419,835	51.80	+4.34		▲3
Liberal/National Coalition	1,320,898	48.20	−4.34		▼4
Invalid/blank votes	79,811	2.8			
Turnout	2,822,626	96.3			
Registered voters	2,932,640				
Source: Federal Elections 1993

== Results by division ==
=== Aston ===
1993 Australian federal election: Aston
Party	Candidate	Votes	%	±%
Liberal	Peter Nugent	36,747	49.19	+0.81
Labor	Sue Craven	32,904	44.04	+7.74
Democrats	Damian Wise	2,960	3.96	−8.95
Call to Australia	Christine Chapman	1,483	1.98	−0.43
Natural Law	Andrew Parry	617	0.83	+0.83
Total formal votes		74,711	97.40	+0.37
Informal votes		1,991	2.60	−0.37
Turnout		76,702	96.90	
Two-party-preferred result
Liberal	Peter Nugent	38,762	51.92	−2.71
Labor	Sue Craven	35,896	48.08	+2.71
Liberal hold		Swing	−2.71	

=== Ballarat ===
1993 Australian federal election: Ballarat
Party	Candidate	Votes	%	±%
Liberal	Michael Ronaldson	33,478	47.47	+1.20
Labor	Peter Devereux	30,470	43.20	+2.36
Call to Australia	Jodie Rickard	2,618	3.71	+0.29
Independent	Geoffrey Hardy	1,703	2.41	+2.41
Democrats	Rob de Caen	1,516	2.15	−6.21
Natural Law	Veronica Caven	740	1.05	+1.05
Total formal votes		70,525	97.76	−0.01
Informal votes		1,614	2.24	+0.01
Turnout		72,139	97.11	
Two-party-preferred result
Liberal	Michael Ronaldson	36,787	52.20	+0.32
Labor	Peter Devereux	33,687	47.80	−0.32
Liberal hold		Swing	+0.32	

=== Batman ===
1993 Australian federal election: Batman
Party	Candidate	Votes	%	±%
Labor	Brian Howe	47,974	67.45	+15.60
Liberal	Mabel Thrupp	17,503	24.61	−2.85
Democrats	Geoff Carr	2,541	3.57	−9.31
	Nigel D'Souza	1,908	2.68	+2.68
Natural Law	Joan Dickens	708	1.00	+1.00
	George Simatkovich	490	0.69	+0.69
Total formal votes		71,124	95.69	+2.03
Informal votes		3,206	4.31	−2.03
Turnout		74,330	95.01	
Two-party-preferred result
Labor	Brian Howe	52,200	73.43	+6.03
Liberal	Mabel Thrupp	18,889	26.57	−6.03
Labor hold		Swing	+6.03	

=== Bendigo ===
1993 Australian federal election: Bendigo
Party	Candidate	Votes	%	±%
Labor	Joe Helper	33,785	46.10	+5.57
Liberal	Bruce Reid	33,527	45.75	+11.83
Democrats	Don Semmens	2,198	3.00	−5.00
Call to Australia	Pamela Taylor	1,717	2.34	+0.07
Independent	Julie Oberin	1,335	1.82	+1.82
Natural Law	Sharon Hill	393	0.54	+0.54
	Doug Harrison	330	0.45	+0.45
Total formal votes		73,285	97.85	+0.22
Informal votes		1,607	2.15	−0.22
Turnout		74,892	97.13	
Two-party-preferred result
Liberal	Bruce Reid	36,677	50.07	−1.08
Labor	Joe Helper	36,579	49.93	+1.08
Liberal hold		Swing	−1.08	

=== Bruce ===
1993 Australian federal election: Bruce
Party	Candidate	Votes	%	±%
Liberal	Julian Beale	37,607	52.85	+0.87
Labor	Beverley Williams	28,986	40.74	+9.42
Democrats	Leslie Chandra	3,899	5.48	−8.07
Natural Law	Nicolas Di Tempora	665	0.93	+0.93
Total formal votes		71,157	97.39	+0.46
Informal votes		1,909	2.61	−0.46
Turnout		74,066	97.23	
Two-party-preferred result
Liberal	Julian Beale	39,181	55.09	−4.24
Labor	Beverley Williams	31,937	44.91	+4.24
Liberal hold		Swing	−4.24	

=== Burke ===
1993 Australian federal election: Burke
Party	Candidate	Votes	%	±%
Labor	Neil O'Keefe	40,067	55.39	+12.51
Liberal	Stephen Mitchell	27,047	37.39	−3.92
Democrats	Iain Ralph	3,180	4.40	−11.42
Call to Australia	Ian Burrowes	1,491	2.06	+2.06
Natural Law	Michael Dickins	552	0.76	+0.76
Total formal votes		72,337	97.29	+1.19
Informal votes		2,013	2.71	−1.19
Turnout		74,350	96.43	
Two-party-preferred result
Labor	Neil O'Keefe	43,345	59.96	+6.66
Liberal	Stephen Mitchell	28,941	40.04	−6.66
Labor hold		Swing	+6.66	

=== Calwell ===
1993 Australian federal election: Calwell
Party	Candidate	Votes	%	±%
Labor	Andrew Theophanous	48,749	64.53	+19.01
Liberal	Dianne Livett	21,752	28.79	−4.01
Democrats	David Mackay	2,140	2.83	−9.20
Independent	Veronica Rodenburg	1,373	1.82	+1.82
AAFI	Rod Spencer	1,013	1.34	+1.34
Natural Law	Sandy Price	522	0.69	+0.69
Total formal votes		75,549	96.26	+1.82
Informal votes		2,936	3.74	−1.82
Turnout		78,485	96.09	
Two-party-preferred result
Labor	Andrew Theophanous	51,672	68.44	+11.37
Liberal	Dianne Livett	23,831	31.56	−11.37
Labor hold		Swing	+11.37	

=== Casey ===
1993 Australian federal election: Casey
Party	Candidate	Votes	%	±%
Liberal	Bob Halverson	38,716	52.55	+4.02
Labor	Julie Warren	29,277	39.74	+9.94
Democrats	Sam Ginsberg	4,574	6.21	−8.68
Natural Law	Robert Kendi	1,104	1.50	+1.50
Total formal votes		73,671	97.52	+0.25
Informal votes		1,875	2.48	−0.25
Turnout		75,546	96.72	
Two-party-preferred result
Liberal	Bob Halverson	41,199	55.97	−2.26
Labor	Julie Warren	32,409	44.03	+2.26
Liberal hold		Swing	−2.26	

=== Chisholm ===
1993 Australian federal election: Chisholm
Party	Candidate	Votes	%	±%
Liberal	Michael Wooldridge	36,198	50.23	+1.76
Labor	Gordon McCaskie	29,998	41.63	+7.45
Democrats	Doug Johnston	4,620	6.41	−6.98
Natural Law	Richard Aldous	1,247	1.73	+1.73
Total formal votes		72,063	97.68	+0.21
Informal votes		1,714	2.32	−0.21
Turnout		73,777	96.32	
Two-party-preferred result
Liberal	Michael Wooldridge	38,083	52.88	−3.41
Labor	Gordon McCaskie	33,937	47.12	+3.41
Liberal hold		Swing	−3.41	

=== Corangamite ===
1993 Australian federal election: Corangamite
Party	Candidate	Votes	%	±%
Liberal	Stewart McArthur	38,133	53.40	−0.82
Labor	Bernie Eades	26,199	36.69	+6.12
Democrats	Greta Pearce	2,208	3.09	−7.90
Independent	Norm Powell	2,203	3.09	+3.09
Independent	John Warnock	1,231	1.72	+1.72
Call to Australia	Terry Winter	866	1.21	−2.19
Natural Law	Isaac Golden	567	0.79	+0.79
Total formal votes		71,407	97.54	−0.14
Informal votes		1,798	2.46	+0.14
Turnout		73,205	96.77	
Two-party-preferred result
Liberal	Stewart McArthur	40,655	56.97	−3.82
Labor	Bernie Eades	30,701	43.03	+3.82
Liberal hold		Swing	−3.82	

=== Corinella ===
1993 Australian federal election: Corinella
Party	Candidate	Votes	%	±%
Labor	Alan Griffin	39,194	50.05	+11.72
Liberal	Russell Broadbent	33,139	42.32	−2.03
Democrats	Taylor Holst	2,224	2.84	−9.09
Natural Law	Gary Nelson	1,494	1.91	+1.91
Independent	Trudie Oldis	1,482	1.89	+1.89
	Predrag Pjanic	782	1.00	+1.00
Total formal votes		78,315	96.94	+0.47
Informal votes		2,470	3.06	−0.47
Turnout		80,785	96.78	
Two-party-preferred result
Labor	Alan Griffin	42,043	53.74	+4.47
Liberal	Russell Broadbent	36,193	46.26	−4.47
Labor gain from Liberal		Swing	+4.47	

=== Corio ===
1993 Australian federal election: Corio
Party	Candidate	Votes	%	±%
Labor	Gavan O'Connor	38,133	52.84	+8.90
Liberal	John Tol	28,063	38.88	+0.56
Democrats	Mike Martorana	3,559	4.93	−5.40
Independent	Aidan Bell	1,076	1.49	+1.49
Call to Australia	Ian Winter	889	1.23	−2.46
Natural Law	Carol Smith	450	0.62	+0.62
Total formal votes		72,170	97.10	+0.86
Informal votes		2,159	2.90	−0.86
Turnout		74,329	95.49	
Two-party-preferred result
Labor	Gavan O'Connor	41,255	57.19	+2.97
Liberal	John Tol	30,880	42.81	−2.97
Labor hold		Swing	+2.97	

=== Deakin ===
1993 Australian federal election: Deakin
Party	Candidate	Votes	%	±%
Liberal	Ken Aldred	34,123	47.40	+2.70
Labor	Greg Adkins	31,073	43.16	+8.86
Democrats	Peter Magart	3,519	4.89	−11.80
Call to Australia	Alan Barron	1,227	1.70	−2.01
Natural Law	Robert Nieuwenhuis	1,060	1.47	+1.47
	William Backhouse	987	1.37	+1.37
Total formal votes		71,989	97.37	−0.28
Informal votes		1,946	2.63	+0.28
Turnout		73,935	96.45	
Two-party-preferred result
Liberal	Ken Aldred	36,879	51.27	−1.08
Labor	Greg Adkins	35,048	48.73	+1.08
Liberal hold		Swing	−1.08	

=== Dunkley ===
1993 Australian federal election: Dunkley
Party	Candidate	Votes	%	±%
Labor	Bob Chynoweth	32,461	47.16	+9.52
Liberal	Frank Ford	31,621	45.94	+2.16
Democrats	Barrie Rowland-Hornblow	2,696	3.92	−9.32
Natural Law	Bev Nelson	2,056	2.99	+2.99
Total formal votes		68,834	97.75	+1.59
Informal votes		1,584	2.25	−1.59
Turnout		70,418	96.32	
Two-party-preferred result
Labor	Bob Chynoweth	34,813	50.61	+1.81
Liberal	Frank Ford	33,969	49.39	−1.81
Labor gain from Liberal		Swing	+1.81	

=== Flinders ===
1993 Australian federal election: Flinders
Party	Candidate	Votes	%	±%
Liberal	Peter Reith	36,735	52.96	+2.04
Labor	Denise Hassett	27,832	40.12	+5.46
Democrats	Malcolm Brown	3,167	4.57	−8.63
Natural Law	Jan Charlwood	1,636	2.36	+2.36
Total formal votes		69,370	97.60	+0.22
Informal votes		1,707	2.40	−0.22
Turnout		71,077	96.45	
Two-party-preferred result
Liberal	Peter Reith	38,271	55.19	−0.05
Labor	Denise Hassett	31,079	44.81	+0.05
Liberal hold		Swing	−0.05	

=== Gellibrand ===
1993 Australian federal election: Gellibrand
Party	Candidate	Votes	%	±%
Labor	Ralph Willis	47,968	69.11	+14.55
Liberal	Chris Macgregor	15,779	22.73	−3.79
Democrats	Alan Parker	2,275	3.28	−7.29
	Nada Benson	2,236	3.22	+3.22
Natural Law	Leon Staropoli	585	0.84	+0.84
Call to Australia	Peter Sanko	570	0.82	+0.82
Total formal votes		69,413	95.93	+2.47
Informal votes		2,944	4.07	−2.47
Turnout		72,357	95.05	
Two-party-preferred result
Labor	Ralph Willis	52,259	75.38	+6.87
Liberal	Chris Macgregor	17,072	24.62	−6.87
Labor hold		Swing	+6.87	

=== Gippsland ===
1993 Australian federal election: Gippsland
Party	Candidate	Votes	%	±%
National	Peter McGauran	43,773	60.54	−0.15
Labor	Judith Stone	21,209	29.33	+6.37
Independent	Ben Buckley	3,049	4.22	+0.76
Democrats	Donal Storey	2,105	2.91	−7.53
	Bruce Phillips	1,720	2.38	+2.38
Natural Law	Paul Van Baer	445	0.62	+0.62
Total formal votes		72,301	97.97	+0.28
Informal votes		1,495	2.03	−0.28
Turnout		73,796	96.33	
Two-party-preferred result
National	Peter McGauran	47,886	66.30	−2.64
Labor	Judith Stone	24,345	33.70	+2.64
National hold		Swing	−2.64	

=== Goldstein ===
1993 Australian federal election: Goldstein
Party	Candidate	Votes	%	±%
Liberal	David Kemp	38,474	52.79	+5.54
Labor	Martin Pakula	28,436	39.02	+9.17
Democrats	Geoff Herbert	3,479	4.77	−8.38
Natural Law	Brian Gale	1,503	2.06	+2.06
	James Ritchie	983	1.35	+1.35
Total formal votes		72,875	97.38	+1.09
Informal votes		1,957	2.62	−1.09
Turnout		74,832	95.57	
Two-party-preferred result
Liberal	David Kemp	40,449	55.54	−0.42
Labor	Martin Pakula	32,376	44.46	+0.42
Liberal hold		Swing	−0.42	

=== Higgins ===
1993 Australian federal election: Higgins
Party	Candidate	Votes	%	±%
Liberal	Peter Costello	41,501	57.36	+1.08
Labor	Joe Cerritelli	25,077	34.66	+7.69
Democrats	Clive Jackson	4,040	5.58	−10.20
Natural Law	Lesley Mendelson	1,740	2.40	+2.40
Total formal votes		72,358	97.50	+0.50
Informal votes		1,852	2.50	−0.50
Turnout		74,210	95.09	
Two-party-preferred result
Liberal	Peter Costello	43,491	60.13	−1.69
Labor	Joe Cerritelli	28,832	39.87	+1.69
Liberal hold		Swing	−1.69	

=== Holt ===
1993 Australian federal election: Holt
Party	Candidate	Votes	%	±%
Labor	Michael Duffy	38,518	56.63	+11.80
Liberal	Barbara Lewis	25,016	36.78	+2.37
Democrats	Michael Burns	2,457	3.61	−8.25
	Stephen Nedeljkovic	1,347	1.98	+1.98
Natural Law	Paul Blackburn	679	1.00	+1.00
Total formal votes		68,017	96.68	+1.48
Informal votes		2,333	3.32	−1.48
Turnout		70,350	95.87	
Two-party-preferred result
Labor	Michael Duffy	40,852	60.10	+3.16
Liberal	Barbara Lewis	27,116	39.90	−3.16
Labor hold		Swing	+3.16	

=== Hotham ===
1993 Australian federal election: Hotham
Party	Candidate	Votes	%	±%
Labor	Simon Crean	42,514	59.30	+15.20
Liberal	Robert Hicks	25,308	35.30	+0.90
Democrats	Giancarlo Squillacciotti	1,743	2.43	−8.59
	Sue Phillips	876	1.22	+1.22
	Petar Pjesivac	765	1.07	+1.07
Natural Law	Gabrielle De Wan	482	0.67	+0.67
Total formal votes		71,688	96.74	+1.58
Informal votes		2,419	3.26	−1.58
Turnout		74,107	96.20	
Two-party-preferred result
Labor	Simon Crean	45,119	62.99	+8.78
Liberal	Robert Hicks	26,511	37.01	−8.78
Labor hold		Swing	+8.78	

=== Indi ===
1993 Australian federal election: Indi
Party	Candidate	Votes	%	±%
Liberal	Lou Lieberman	28,951	40.65	−9.49
Labor	Jenny Luck	24,475	34.36	+9.56
National	Philip Pullar	16,483	23.14	+23.14
Natural Law	Jeanette Martin	1,317	1.85	+1.85
Total formal votes		71,226	97.75	+0.09
Informal votes		1,637	2.25	−0.09
Turnout		72,863	96.23	
Two-party-preferred result
Liberal	Lou Lieberman	44,767	62.88	−1.32
Labor	Jenny Luck	26,431	37.12	+1.32
Liberal hold		Swing	−1.32	

=== Isaacs ===
1993 Australian federal election: Isaacs
Party	Candidate	Votes	%	±%
Liberal	Rod Atkinson	35,792	50.55	+0.07
Labor	John McSwiney	30,007	42.38	+8.48
Democrats	Kaylyn Raynor	3,546	5.01	−10.60
Natural Law	Judee Horin	1,458	2.06	+2.06
Total formal votes		70,803	97.57	+0.60
Informal votes		1,761	2.43	−0.60
Turnout		72,564	96.42	
Two-party-preferred result
Liberal	Rod Atkinson	37,490	52.98	−2.74
Labor	John McSwiney	33,266	47.02	+2.74
Liberal hold		Swing	−2.74	

=== Jagajaga ===
1993 Australian federal election: Jagajaga
Party	Candidate	Votes	%	±%
Labor	Peter Staples	33,881	50.14	+9.75
Liberal	Alistair Urquhart	27,441	40.61	+0.21
Democrats	Bob West	2,137	3.16	−12.39
Independent	Chris Vassis	843	1.25	+1.25
AAFI	Angela Walker	842	1.25	+1.25
Natural Law	Sue Griffith	795	1.18	+1.18
Independent	Gary Foley	592	0.88	+0.88
Call to Australia	Doreen O'Kane	436	0.65	−1.86
	Eric Kirkwood	344	0.51	+0.51
Independent	Richard Fitzherbert	260	0.38	+0.38
Total formal votes		67,571	96.81	−0.22
Informal votes		2,225	3.19	+0.22
Turnout		69,796	96.78	
Two-party-preferred result
Labor	Peter Staples	37,430	55.46	+2.82
Liberal	Alistair Urquhart	30,064	44.54	−2.82
Labor hold		Swing	+2.82	

=== Kooyong ===
1993 Australian federal election: Kooyong
Party	Candidate	Votes	%	±%
Liberal	Andrew Peacock	42,363	61.13	+3.10
Labor	Wayne Clarke	20,961	30.25	+7.42
Democrats	David Zemdegs	3,780	5.45	−8.34
Natural Law	Christine Harris	1,210	1.75	+1.75
Imperial British	David Greagg	987	1.42	+0.99
Total formal votes		69,301	97.47	+0.26
Informal votes		1,801	2.53	−0.26
Turnout		71,102	95.79	
Two-party-preferred result
Liberal	Andrew Peacock	44,381	64.07	−0.74
Labor	Wayne Clarke	24,893	35.93	+0.74
Liberal hold		Swing	−0.74	

=== La Trobe ===
1993 Australian federal election: La Trobe
Party	Candidate	Votes	%	±%
Liberal	Bob Charles	35,306	48.17	+4.49
Labor	Geoff Pain	29,715	40.54	+5.78
Greens	Rebecca Wigney	3,317	4.53	+4.53
Democrats	Raymond Jungwirth	3,106	4.24	−13.71
Call to Australia	Wolfgang Voigt	866	1.18	−2.44
Independent EFF	Peter Herbert	552	0.75	+0.75
Natural Law	Juliana Kendi	436	0.59	+0.59
Total formal votes		73,298	97.64	+0.06
Informal votes		1,772	2.36	−0.06
Turnout		75,070	96.42	
Two-party-preferred result
Liberal	Bob Charles	38,348	52.36	+1.01
Labor	Geoff Pain	34,893	47.64	−1.01
Liberal hold		Swing	+1.01	

=== Lalor ===
1993 Australian federal election: Lalor
Party	Candidate	Votes	%	±%
Labor	Barry Jones	47,390	64.29	+16.26
Liberal	Anne Canterbury	22,400	30.39	−1.29
Democrats	Carla Stacey	2,113	2.87	−7.17
Call to Australia	Anthony Golding	1,126	1.53	−1.44
Natural Law	Floyd Evans	682	0.93	+0.93
Total formal votes		73,711	96.75	+0.79
Informal votes		2,473	3.25	−0.79
Turnout		76,184	96.76	
Two-party-preferred result
Labor	Barry Jones	49,628	67.35	+8.38
Liberal	Anne Canterbury	24,055	32.65	−8.38
Labor hold		Swing	+8.38	

=== Mallee ===
1993 Australian federal election: Mallee
Party	Candidate	Votes	%	±%
National	John Forrest	27,708	37.66	−31.66
Liberal	Adrian Kidd	23,894	32.48	+32.48
Labor	John Zigouras	19,510	26.52	+4.23
Democrats	Christopher Stear	1,840	2.50	−5.89
Natural Law	Andrew Lawson Kerr	617	0.84	+0.84
Total formal votes		73,569	97.56	−0.11
Informal votes		1,841	2.44	+0.11
Turnout		75,410	97.01	
Two-party-preferred result
National	John Forrest	37,104	50.50	−23.30
Liberal	Adrian Kidd	36,368	49.50	+49.50
National hold		Swing	+0.1	

=== Maribyrnong ===
1993 Australian federal election: Maribyrnong
Party	Candidate	Votes	%	±%
Labor	Alan Griffiths	47,161	65.09	+16.45
Liberal	Maureen Hopper	21,146	29.19	−9.17
Democrats	Frances McKay	2,407	3.32	−9.69
	George Marinkovic	1,126	1.55	+1.55
Natural Law	John Bell	614	0.85	+0.85
Total formal votes		72,454	96.48	+2.53
Informal votes		2,647	3.52	−2.53
Turnout		75,101	96.29	
Two-party-preferred result
Labor	Alan Griffiths	49,765	68.72	+11.51
Liberal	Maureen Hopper	22,649	31.28	−11.51
Labor hold		Swing	+11.51	

=== McEwen ===
1993 Australian federal election: McEwen
Party	Candidate	Votes	%	±%
Liberal	Fran Bailey	35,549	46.96	+0.12
Labor	Peter Cleeland	34,320	45.34	+7.04
Democrats	Geoff Mosley	3,022	3.99	−6.37
Independent	Harry Grey	2,148	2.84	+2.84
Natural Law	Julie Nihill	655	0.87	+0.87
Total formal votes		75,694	97.35	+0.10
Informal votes		2,064	2.65	−0.10
Turnout		77,758	96.42	
Two-party-preferred result
Labor	Peter Cleeland	38,347	50.69	+3.90
Liberal	Fran Bailey	37,307	49.31	−3.90
Labor gain from Liberal		Swing	+3.90	

=== McMillan ===
1993 Australian federal election: McMillan
Party	Candidate	Votes	%	±%
Labor	Barry Cunningham	34,295	45.66	+7.77
Liberal	John Riggall	32,939	43.86	+5.52
Independent	Helen Hoppner	4,385	5.84	+5.84
Democrats	David White	2,515	3.35	−6.86
Independent	Glen Mann	540	0.72	−0.05
Natural Law	Cathy Boschin	428	0.57	+0.57
Total formal votes		75,102	97.60	+0.31
Informal votes		1,848	2.40	−0.31
Turnout		76,950	96.92	
Two-party-preferred result
Labor	Barry Cunningham	37,793	50.40	+4.84
Liberal	John Riggall	37,200	49.60	−4.84
Labor gain from Liberal		Swing	+4.84	

=== Melbourne ===
1993 Australian federal election: Melbourne
Party	Candidate	Votes	%	±%
Labor	Lindsay Tanner	47,958	65.73	+14.39
Liberal	Riza Kozanoglu	17,507	23.99	−1.95
Democrats	Dias Cooper	2,756	3.78	−14.11
Democratic Socialist	Di Quinn	1,955	2.68	+0.98
Independent	Elvie Sievers	1,348	1.85	+1.85
Natural Law	Larry Clarke	765	1.05	+1.05
Imperial British	James Ferrari	394	0.54	−0.08
	Stevan Ivanov	281	0.39	+0.39
Total formal votes		72,964	96.32	+1.64
Informal votes		2,785	3.68	−1.64
Turnout		75,749	92.97	
Two-party-preferred result
Labor	Lindsay Tanner	53,735	73.74	+6.27
Liberal	Riza Kozanoglu	19,133	26.26	−6.27
Labor hold		Swing	+6.27	

=== Melbourne Ports ===
1993 Australian federal election: Melbourne Ports
Party	Candidate	Votes	%	±%
Labor	Clyde Holding	34,751	48.65	+9.10
Liberal	Helen Friedmann	29,817	41.74	−1.86
Democrats	Beverley Broadbent	2,614	3.66	−11.85
Independent	Andrew Colbert	2,291	3.21	+3.21
	Christine Craik	1,276	1.79	+1.79
Natural Law	Caroline Hockley	678	0.95	+0.95
Total formal votes		71,427	97.07	+0.55
Informal votes		2,153	2.93	−0.55
Turnout		73,580	93.66	
Two-party-preferred result
Labor	Clyde Holding	39,862	55.85	+3.80
Liberal	Helen Friedmann	31,513	44.15	−3.80
Labor hold		Swing	+3.80	

=== Menzies ===
1993 Australian federal election: Menzies
Party	Candidate	Votes	%	±%
Liberal	Kevin Andrews	40,200	57.37	−1.08
Labor	Peter De Angelis	26,154	37.32	+9.46
Democrats	John Dobinson	2,955	4.22	−7.38
Natural Law	Denis Quinlan	762	1.09	+1.09
Total formal votes		70,071	97.18	+0.24
Informal votes		2,030	2.82	−0.24
Turnout		72,101	97.17	
Two-party-preferred result
Liberal	Kevin Andrews	41,488	59.23	−5.02
Labor	Peter De Angelis	28,553	40.77	+5.02
Liberal hold		Swing	−5.02	

=== Murray ===
1993 Australian federal election: Murray
Party	Candidate	Votes	%	±%
National	Bruce Lloyd	49,506	67.31	+0.70
Labor	John Sheen	19,555	26.59	+5.56
Democrats	Allan Thomson	2,027	2.76	−6.41
Independent	Dennis Lacey	1,678	2.28	+2.28
Natural Law	Sonia Hyland	781	1.06	+1.06
Total formal votes		73,547	97.54	+0.10
Informal votes		1,856	2.46	−0.10
Turnout		75,403	96.95	
Two-party-preferred result
National	Bruce Lloyd	51,767	70.41	−2.86
Labor	John Sheen	21,754	29.59	+2.86
National hold		Swing	−2.86	

=== Scullin ===
1993 Australian federal election: Scullin
Party	Candidate	Votes	%	±%
Labor	Harry Jenkins	46,672	62.33	+14.46
Liberal	Barbara Smith	20,988	28.03	−7.75
Independent	John Siddons	2,648	3.54	+3.54
Democrats	John Georgievski	2,259	3.02	−11.23
Citizens Electoral Council	Don Veitch	1,027	1.37	+1.37
Independent	Jordan Grujovski	874	1.17	+1.17
Natural Law	Neil Phillips	412	0.55	+0.55
Total formal votes		74,880	96.13	+1.21
Informal votes		3,012	3.87	−1.21
Turnout		77,892	97.02	
Two-party-preferred result
Labor	Harry Jenkins	51,314	68.62	+9.23
Liberal	Barbara Smith	23,468	31.38	−9.23
Labor hold		Swing	+9.23	

=== Wannon ===
1993 Australian federal election: Wannon
Party	Candidate	Votes	%	±%
Liberal	David Hawker	40,819	55.46	−1.55
Labor	Richard Morrow	26,846	36.47	+5.70
Independent	John Philpot	1,963	2.67	+2.67
Democrats	Donald Anderson	1,534	2.08	−6.85
Independent	Les Hemingway	1,234	1.68	+1.68
Independent	David Wilson	746	1.01	+1.01
Natural Law	Yasmin Horsham	462	0.63	+0.63
Total formal votes		73,604	97.45	−0.27
Informal votes		1,926	2.55	+0.27
Turnout		75,530	97.31	
Two-party-preferred result
Liberal	David Hawker	43,608	59.27	−3.39
Labor	Richard Morrow	29.967	40.73	+3.39
Liberal hold		Swing	−3.39	

=== Wills ===
1993 Australian federal election: Wills
Party	Candidate	Votes	%	±%
Labor	Bill Kardamitsis	29,499	41.88	−6.80
Independent	Phil Cleary	20,721	29.42	+29.42
Liberal	Jack Minas	17,386	24.68	−9.80
Democrats	Robert Stone	1,474	2.09	−7.48
Independent	Katheryne Savage	652	0.93	+0.93
	Ken Mantell	271	0.38	+0.38
Imperial British	Cecil G. Murgatroyd	219	0.31	-0.17
Natural Law	John Price	212	0.30	+0.30
Total formal votes		70,434	96.64	+2.99
Informal votes		2,451	3.36	−2.99
Turnout		72,885	95.26	
Notional two-party-preferred count
Labor	Bill Kardamitsis	49,311	70.20	+12.27
Liberal	Jack Minas	20,932	29.80	−12.27
Two-candidate-preferred result
Independent	Phil Cleary	36,816	52.42	+52.42
Labor	Bill Kardamitsis	33,412	47.58	−10.30
Independent gain from Labor		Swing	N/A	

Bob Hawke (Labor) had won the seat at the 1990 election, however he resigned in 1992 and Phil Cleary (Independent) won the seat at the resulting by-election.

== See also ==
- Results of the 1993 Australian federal election (House of Representatives)
- Members of the Australian House of Representatives, 1993–1996
