= Results of the 1984 Australian federal election in Victoria =

1984 Australian federal election (Victoria)
← 1983	1 December 1984	1987 →

All 39 Victorian seats in the Australian House of Representatives and 7 seats in the Australian Senate
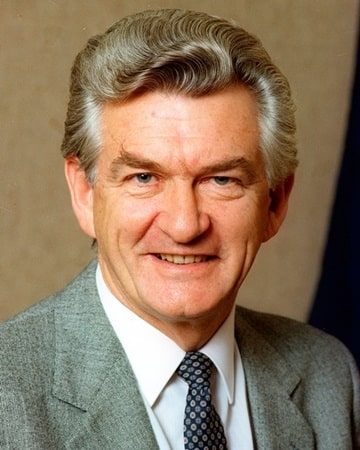

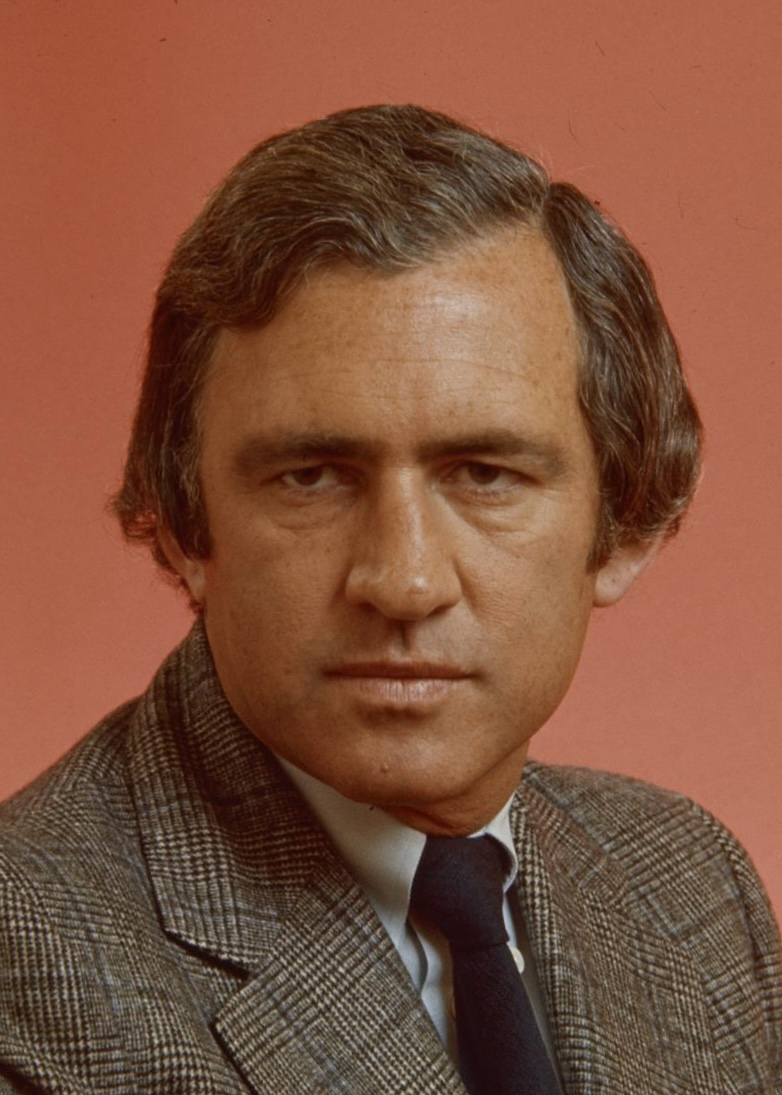
	First party	Second party
Leader	Bob Hawke	Andrew Peacock
Party	Labor	Liberal/National coalition
Last election	23 seats	10 seats
Seats won	25 seats	14 seats
Seat change	▲2	▲4
Popular vote	1,117,874	987,858
Percentage	48.9%	43.3%
Swing	▼1.6	▲1.3
TPP	54.09%	46.91%
TPP swing	▲4.85	▼4.85

This is a list of electoral division results for the Australian 1984 federal election in the state of Victoria.

== Overall results ==
Turnout 95.1% (CV) — Informal 8.2%
Party	Votes	%	Swing	Seats	Change
Liberal	842,423	36.88	–0.20	11	▲4
National	145,435	6.37	1.50	3	Steady
Liberal/National Coalition	987,858	43.24	1.30	14	▲4
Labor	1,117,873	48.93	–1.60	25	▲2
Democrats	115,172	5.04	–0.70		
Democratic Labor	49,121	2.15			
Independent	8,925	0.39			
Nuclear Disarmament	2,702	0.12			
Pensioner	1,645	0.07			
Socialist Workers	1,236	0.05			
Total	2,284,532			39	▲6
Two-party-preferred vote
Labor	1,212,308	53.09	+4.85		▲2
Liberal/National Coalition	1,071,270	46.91	–4.85		▲4
Invalid/blank votes	202,740	8.2	+5.9		
Turnout	2,487,273	95.1			
Registered voters	2,614,383				
Source: Federal Election Results 1949-1993

== Results by division ==
=== Aston ===
1984 Australian federal election: Aston
Party	Candidate	Votes	%	±%
Labor	John Saunderson	28,926	51.1	+0.1
Liberal	Rob Llewellyn	22,286	39.4	+2.1
Democrats	Harry Eichler	3,920	6.9	−1.4
Democratic Labor	Robert Garratt	1,433	2.5	+0.7
Total formal votes		56,565	92.3	
Informal votes		4,710	7.7	
Turnout		61,275	95.8	
Two-party-preferred result
Labor	John Saunderson	31,919	56.5	−0.5
Liberal	Rob Llewellyn	24,612	43.5	+0.5
Labor notional hold		Swing	−0.5	

=== Ballarat ===
1984 Australian federal election: Ballarat
Party	Candidate	Votes	%	±%
Labor	John Mildren	31,119	49.4	+1.5
Liberal	John Ronan	27,952	44.4	−2.5
Democrats	Graham Gough	2,163	3.4	+0.3
National	Douglas Stewart	961	1.5	+1.5
Democratic Labor	John Ferwerda	737	1.2	+1.2
Total formal votes		62,932	93.8	
Informal votes		4,148	6.2	
Turnout		67,080	96.4	
Two-party-preferred result
Labor	John Mildren	32,411	51.5	+0.2
Liberal	John Ronan	30,505	48.5	−0.2
Labor hold		Swing	+0.2	

=== Batman ===
1984 Australian federal election: Batman
Party	Candidate	Votes	%	±%
Labor	Brian Howe	39,128	71.6	+0.1
Liberal	Mark Hoysted	11,371	20.8	−0.2
Democrats	James Cockell	2,338	4.3	−0.1
Democratic Labor	Philip L'Huillier	1,836	3.4	+0.8
Total formal votes		54,673	87.8	
Informal votes		7,597	12.2	
Turnout		62,270	94.4	
Two-party-preferred result
Labor	Brian Howe	40,845	74.7	−0.2
Liberal	Mark Hoysted	13,807	25.3	+0.2
Labor hold		Swing	−0.2	

=== Bendigo ===
1984 Australian federal election: Bendigo
Party	Candidate	Votes	%	±%
Labor	John Brumby	31,047	49.1	+1.1
Liberal	Daryl McClure	23,197	36.7	−8.2
National	Reginald Holt	5,599	8.9	+6.1
Democrats	Nola Rixon	2,017	3.2	−1.2
Democratic Labor	Vincent Jordan	1,361	2.2	−0.4
Total formal votes		63,221	94.9	
Informal votes		3,377	5.1	
Turnout		66,598	96.4	
Two-party-preferred result
Labor	John Brumby	32,786	52.0	+0.9
Liberal	Daryl McClure	30,287	48.0	−0.9
Labor hold		Swing	+0.9	

=== Bruce ===
1984 Australian federal election: Bruce
Party	Candidate	Votes	%	±%
Liberal	Ken Aldred	27,536	46.7	+2.3
Labor	Joan Graystone	25,723	43.6	−0.6
Democrats	Michael Johnson	3,528	6.0	−1.8
Democratic Labor	Mary Mulholland	2,171	3.7	+3.7
Total formal votes		58,958	93.6	
Informal votes		4,061	6.4	
Turnout		63,019	96.2	
Two-party-preferred result
Liberal	Ken Aldred	30,711	52.1	+1.3
Labor	Joan Graystone	28,230	47.9	−1.3
Liberal hold		Swing	+1.3	

=== Burke ===
1984 Australian federal election: Burke
Party	Candidate	Votes	%	±%
Labor	Neil O'Keefe	27,445	48.7	−0.5
Liberal	Marisa d'Agostino	23,273	41.3	−2.4
Democrats	George Hunter	2,985	5.3	−0.8
National	Leslie Vidler	1,823	3.2	+3.2
Democratic Labor	Genevieve Cormick	862	1.5	+1.5
Total formal votes		56,389	91.7	
Informal votes		5,073	8.3	
Turnout		61,462	95.6	
Two-party-preferred result
Labor	Neil O'Keefe	29,836	52.9	−0.9
Liberal	Marisa d'Agostino	26,546	47.1	+0.9
Labor hold		Swing	−0.9	

=== Calwell ===
1984 Australian federal election: Calwell
Party	Candidate	Votes	%	±%
Labor	Andrew Theophanous	36,660	68.8	+0.6
Liberal	Graham Andersen	13,277	24.9	+0.1
Democrats	Lesley Ellen	2,502	4.7	+0.0
Democratic Labor	Martin Mulholland	870	1.6	+1.6
Total formal votes		53,309	87.0	
Informal votes		7,979	13.0	
Turnout		61,288	95.4	
Two-party-preferred result
Labor	Andrew Theophanous	38,474	72.2	+0.0
Liberal	Graham Andersen	14,830	27.8	−0.0
Labor notional hold		Swing	+0.0	

=== Casey ===
1984 Australian federal election: Casey
Party	Candidate	Votes	%	±%
Labor	Peter Steedman	25,240	44.2	−1.0
Liberal	Bob Halverson	25,070	43.9	−1.0
Democrats	Michael Nardella	3,709	6.5	−1.0
Democratic Labor	John Garratt	1,744	3.1	+1.9
National	Robert Gray	729	1.3	+1.3
Pensioner	Rosamund Ewan	564	1.0	+1.0
Total formal votes		57,056	93.6	
Informal votes		3,902	6.4	
Turnout		60,958	95.5	
Two-party-preferred result
Liberal	Bob Halverson	28,854	50.6	+0.5
Labor	Peter Steedman	28,193	49.4	−0.5
Liberal gain from Labor		Swing	+0.5	

=== Chisholm ===
1984 Australian federal election: Chisholm
Party	Candidate	Votes	%	±%
Labor	Helen Mayer	28,696	45.6	−2.3
Liberal	Graham Harris	27,860	44.3	+1.9
Democrats	Colin Rochford	3,928	6.2	−0.3
Democratic Labor	Kevin Carroll	1,779	2.8	−0.4
National	Ray Murphy	693	1.1	+1.1
Total formal votes		62,956	92.1	
Informal votes		5,405	7.9	
Turnout		68,361	95.3	
Two-party-preferred result
Labor	Helen Mayer	31,566	50.2	−1.7
Liberal	Graham Harris	31,375	49.8	+1.7
Labor hold		Swing	−1.7	

=== Corangamite ===
1984 Australian federal election: Corangamite
Party	Candidate	Votes	%	±%
Liberal	Stewart McArthur	29,487	47.9	−5.9
Labor	Gavan O'Connor	25,772	41.9	−4.3
Democrats	Robert Mann	2,178	3.5	+3.5
National	Bruce Webster	2,028	3.3	+3.3
Democratic Labor	James Jordan	1,559	2.5	+2.5
Pensioner	Roy Charles	552	0.9	+0.9
Total formal votes		61,576	94.1	
Informal votes		3,846	5.9	
Turnout		65,422	97.0	
Two-party-preferred result
Liberal	Stewart McArthur	32,886	53.4	−0.4
Labor	Gavan O'Connor	28,660	46.6	+0.4
Liberal hold		Swing	−0.4	

=== Corio ===
1984 Australian federal election: Corio
Party	Candidate	Votes	%	±%
Labor	Gordon Scholes	35,042	59.2	−1.8
Liberal	Roger Phipps	19,927	33.7	−0.4
Democrats	Greta Pearce	1,788	3.0	−1.8
National	James King	1,198	2.0	+2.0
Democratic Labor	Louise Sharah	865	1.5	+1.5
Independent	Ian Green	368	0.6	+0.6
Total formal votes		59,188	90.5	
Informal votes		6,208	9.5	
Turnout		65,396	96.0	
Two-party-preferred result
Labor	Gordon Scholes	36,920	62.4	−1.5
Liberal	Roger Phipps	22,258	37.6	+1.5
Labor hold		Swing	−1.5	

=== Deakin ===
1984 Australian federal election: Deakin
Party	Candidate	Votes	%	±%
Liberal	Julian Beale	28,975	46.8	+2.5
Labor	Richard Johns	27,980	45.2	−0.3
Democrats	Jeffrey McAlpine	3,774	6.1	−0.6
Democratic Labor	Peter Ferwerda	1,240	2.0	−1.7
Total formal votes		61,969	93.9	
Informal votes		4,042	6.1	
Turnout		66,011	96.1	
Two-party-preferred result
Liberal	Julian Beale	31,435	50.7	+0.0
Labor	Richard Johns	30,530	49.3	-0.0
Liberal hold		Swing	+0.0	

=== Dunkley ===
1984 Australian federal election: Dunkley
Party	Candidate	Votes	%	±%
Labor	Bob Chynoweth	26,605	46.4	−2.5
Liberal	Leonie Clark	25,070	43.7	+1.7
Democrats	Grenville Charles	3,519	6.1	−0.4
National	Judy Hale	1,494	2.6	+2.6
Democratic Labor	John Cass	621	1.1	−1.1
Total formal votes		57,309	92.3	
Informal votes		4,749	7.7	
Turnout		62,058	95.3	
Two-party-preferred result
Labor	Bob Chynoweth	29,296	51.1	−2.1
Liberal	Leonie Clark	28,003	48.9	+2.1
Labor notional hold		Swing	−2.1	

=== Flinders ===
1984 Australian federal election: Flinders
Party	Candidate	Votes	%	±%
Liberal	Peter Reith	25,450	45.4	+0.3
Labor	Russell Joiner	25,287	45.1	−1.4
Democrats	Murray Gill	2,389	4.3	−1.7
National	Paul van Staveren	1,780	3.2	+3.2
Democratic Labor	John McNamara	646	1.2	−1.2
Pensioner	John Miln	529	0.9	+0.9
Total formal votes		56,081	93.1	
Informal votes		4,139	6.9	
Turnout		60,220	95.2	
Two-party-preferred result
Liberal	Peter Reith	28,694	51.2	+1.5
Labor	Russell Joiner	27,379	48.8	−1.5
Liberal gain from Labor		Swing	+1.5	

=== Gellibrand ===
1984 Australian federal election: Gellibrand
Party	Candidate	Votes	%	±%
Labor	Ralph Willis	40,777	69.5	−0.6
Liberal	Christopher Gowing	14,073	24.0	+2.7
Democrats	Shirley Bold	2,148	3.7	−0.3
Democratic Labor	Margaret Reed	982	1.7	+1.7
Socialist Workers	James Doughney	672	1.1	−3.1
Total formal votes		58,652	88.1	
Informal votes		7,913	11.9	
Turnout		66,565	94.6	
Two-party-preferred result
Labor	Ralph Willis	43,000	73.3	−2.2
Liberal	Christopher Gowing	15,624	26.7	+2.2
Labor hold		Swing	−2.2	

=== Gippsland ===
1984 Australian federal election: Gippsland
Party	Candidate	Votes	%	±%
National	Peter McGauran	24,818	40.8	+8.9
Labor	Bill de Vink	17,522	28.8	−6.2
Liberal	Rod Conley	11,984	19.7	−4.1
Nuclear Disarmament	Peter Gardner	2,702	4.4	+4.4
Democrats	Wilma Western	1,808	3.0	−1.0
Independent	Ben Buckley	1,176	1.9	+1.9
Democratic Labor	Margaret Handley	789	1.3	+1.3
Total formal votes		60,799	94.0	
Informal votes		3,898	6.0	
Turnout		64,697	95.1	
Two-party-preferred result
National	Peter McGauran	39,056	64.3	+4.2
Labor	Bill De Vink	21,692	35.7	−4.2
National hold		Swing	+4.2	

=== Goldstein ===
1984 Australian federal election: Goldstein
Party	Candidate	Votes	%	±%
Liberal	Ian Macphee	32,788	52.1	+2.0
Labor	Garry Moore	24,147	38.4	−2.6
Democrats	Maureen Boaler	3,232	5.1	−2.8
Democratic Labor	Patrick Keelan	1,763	2.8	+2.8
National	Pat Brown	1,014	1.6	+1.6
Total formal votes		62,944	92.0	
Informal votes		5,492	8.0	
Turnout		68,436	94.0	
Two-party-preferred result
Liberal	Ian Macphee	35,357	56.2	+2.8
Labor	Garry Moore	27,548	43.8	−2.8
Liberal notional hold		Swing	+2.8	

=== Henty ===
1984 Australian federal election: Henty
Party	Candidate	Votes	%	±%
Labor	Joan Child	32,297	52.9	−1.2
Liberal	Rudi Michelson	23,885	39.1	−0.3
Democrats	Margaret Moore	3,216	5.3	+1.0
Democratic Labor	Martin Callanan	988	1.6	−0.6
National	Peter Ryan	690	1.1	+1.1
Total formal votes		61,076	93.1	
Informal votes		4,492	6.9	
Turnout		65,568	94.4	
Two-party-preferred result
Labor	Joan Child	34,627	56.7	−0.2
Liberal	Rudi Michelson	26,441	43.3	+0.2
Labor hold		Swing	−0.2	

=== Higgins ===
1984 Australian federal election: Higgins
Party	Candidate	Votes	%	±%
Liberal	Roger Shipton	35,062	57.0	+1.0
Labor	Kenneth Penaluna	20,543	33.4	−3.7
Democrats	Laurence Levy	3,570	5.8	−0.3
National	Babette Francis	1,600	2.6	+2.6
Democratic Labor	Robert Semmel	692	1.1	+1.1
Total formal votes		61,467	93.3	
Informal votes		4,391	6.7	
Turnout		65,858	93.5	
Two-party-preferred result
Liberal	Roger Shipton	38,140	62.1	+3.3
Labor	Kenneth Penaluna	23,312	37.9	−3.3
Liberal hold		Swing	+3.3	

=== Holt ===
1984 Australian federal election: Holt
Party	Candidate	Votes	%	±%
Labor	Michael Duffy	31,117	58.7	−0.3
Liberal	John Ferwerda	18,436	34.8	+0.6
Democrats	Louise Stewart	2,467	4.7	−2.1
Democratic Labor	Brian McDonald	960	1.8	+1.8
Total formal votes		52,980	89.5	
Informal votes		6,232	10.5	
Turnout		59,212	95.3	
Two-party-preferred result
Labor	Michael Duffy	32,946	62.2	−0.9
Liberal	John Ferwerda	20,034	37.8	+0.9
Labor hold		Swing	−0.9	

=== Hotham ===
1984 Australian federal election: Hotham
Party	Candidate	Votes	%	±%
Labor	Lewis Kent	31,821	53.5	−4.4
Liberal	Michael Heffernan	20,736	34.9	−1.1
Democrats	Greg Chipp	5,028	8.5	+2.4
Democratic Labor	Edward Woods	1,845	3.1	+3.1
Total formal votes		59,430	90.1	
Informal votes		6,505	9.9	
Turnout		65,935	95.4	
Two-party-preferred result
Labor	Lewis Kent	34,551	58.2	−3.5
Liberal	Michael Heffernan	24,865	41.8	+3.5
Labor hold		Swing	−3.5	

=== Indi ===
1984 Australian federal election: Indi
Party	Candidate	Votes	%	±%
Labor	Joe Murphy	21,349	34.3	−1.7
Liberal	Ewen Cameron	20,691	33.3	−8.1
National	Bill Baxter	17,602	28.3	+9.2
Democrats	Geoffrey le Couteur	1,797	2.9	−0.6
Democratic Labor	Paul Carroll	780	1.3	+1.3
Total formal votes		62,219	94.4	
Informal votes		3,684	5.6	
Turnout		65,903	95.2	
Two-party-preferred result
Liberal	Ewen Cameron	38,733	62.3	+1.6
Labor	Joe Murphy	23,468	37.7	−1.6
Liberal hold		Swing	+1.6	

=== Isaacs ===
1984 Australian federal election: Isaacs
Party	Candidate	Votes	%	±%
Labor	David Charles	30,612	50.9	−2.0
Liberal	Peter Zablud	24,079	40.1	−0.4
Democrats	Peter Lindemann	3,693	6.1	−0.6
Democratic Labor	Dudley de Rozario	933	1.6	+1.6
National	Charles Lacey	774	1.3	+1.3
Total formal votes		60,091	92.5	
Informal votes		4,894	7.5	
Turnout		64,985	95.3	
Two-party-preferred result
Labor	David Charles	32,681	54.4	−2.5
Liberal	Peter Zablud	27,407	45.6	+2.5
Labor hold		Swing	−2.5	

=== Jagajaga ===
1984 Australian federal election: Jagajaga
Party	Candidate	Votes	%	±%
Labor	Peter Staples	29,781	53.0	−2.6
Liberal	Frederick Garratt	20,905	37.2	+1.6
Democrats	Peter Lovell	3,038	5.4	+0.0
Democratic Labor	Len Moore	2,106	3.7	+1.9
Independent	Nino de Tress	357	0.6	+0.6
Total formal votes		56,187	91.9	
Informal votes		4,982	8.1	
Turnout		61,169	95.6	
Two-party-preferred result
Labor	Peter Staples	31,518	56.1	−2.3
Liberal	Frederick Garratt	24,644	43.9	+2.3
Labor notional hold		Swing	−2.3	

=== Kooyong ===
1984 Australian federal election: Kooyong
Party	Candidate	Votes	%	±%
Liberal	Andrew Peacock	36,491	58.8	+1.8
Labor	Kate Nash	20,624	33.3	−1.8
Democrats	Russell White	3,385	5.5	−1.7
Democratic Labor	John Mulholland	1,156	1.9	+1.9
Imperial British	David Greagg	351	0.6	+0.6
Total formal votes		62,007	93.8	
Informal votes		4,095	6.2	
Turnout		66,102	94.0	
Two-party-preferred result
Liberal	Andrew Peacock	39,074	63.0	+3.2
Labor	Kate Nash	22,933	37.0	−3.2
Liberal hold		Swing	+3.2	

=== La Trobe ===
1984 Australian federal election: La Trobe
Party	Candidate	Votes	%	±%
Labor	Peter Milton	28,853	54.0	+1.6
Liberal	Ted French	19,438	36.4	+2.0
Democrats	Andrew McCann	4,185	7.8	−2.7
Democratic Labor	Julie Garratt	976	1.8	+1.8
Total formal votes		53,452	92.1	
Informal votes		4,574	7.9	
Turnout		58,026	95.2	
Two-party-preferred result
Labor	Peter Milton	31,370	58.7	−1.8
Liberal	Ted French	22,077	41.3	+1.8
Labor hold		Swing	−1.8	

=== Lalor ===
1984 Australian federal election: Lalor
Party	Candidate	Votes	%	±%
Labor	Barry Jones	38,024	67.2	+3.1
Liberal	Mark Pallett	15,306	27.1	−3.0
Democrats	Barry McLeod	2,383	4.2	−0.7
Democratic Labor	Gail de Rozario	839	1.5	+1.5
Total formal votes		56,552	90.5	
Informal votes		5,902	9.5	
Turnout		62,454	95.7	
Two-party-preferred result
Labor	Barry Jones	39,569	70.0	+2.1
Liberal	Mark Pallett	16,982	30.0	−2.1
Labor hold		Swing	+2.1	

=== Mallee ===
1984 Australian federal election: Mallee
Party	Candidate	Votes	%	±%
National	Peter Fisher	33,173	53.5	−8.2
Labor	Lindsay Leake	15,584	25.1	−0.4
Liberal	M. Treseder	9,506	15.3	+5.8
Democratic Labor	Robert Hogarth	1,776	2.9	+2.9
Democrats	Colin Cavanagh	1,318	2.1	−1.1
Independent	Albertus Stoutjesdijk	613	1.0	+1.0
Total formal votes		61,970	93.9	
Informal votes		4,034	6.1	
Turnout		66,004	95.7	
Two-party-preferred result
National	Peter Fisher	44,237	71.4	−0.2
Labor	Lindsay Leake	17,687	28.6	+0.2
National hold		Swing	−0.2	

=== Maribyrnong ===
1984 Australian federal election: Maribyrnong
Party	Candidate	Votes	%	±%
Labor	Alan Griffiths	31,684	54.6	−2.8
Liberal	Sally Gooch	20,441	35.3	+3.1
Democratic Labor	Rosemary Maurus	2,577	4.4	+4.4
Democrats	Kathie Gizycki	2,466	4.3	−1.7
Socialist Workers	Helen Said	564	1.0	−1.7
Independent	Richard Wright	249	0.4	+0.4
Total formal votes		57,981	89.4	
Informal votes		6,863	10.6	
Turnout		64,844	95.8	
Two-party-preferred result
Labor	Alan Griffiths	34,993	60.4	−4.2
Liberal	Sally Gooch	22,967	39.6	+4.2
Labor hold		Swing	−4.2	

=== McEwen ===
1984 Australian federal election: McEwen
Party	Candidate	Votes	%	±%
Labor	Peter Cleeland	25,984	47.0	−1.4
Liberal	Brian Dixon	20,331	36.8	−3.1
National	John Brewster	4,571	8.3	+3.5
Democrats	Julie Stayner	3,547	6.4	+1.2
Democratic Labor	Daniel Mason	853	1.5	+1.5
Total formal votes		55,286	92.4	
Informal votes		4,559	7.6	
Turnout		59,845	95.4	
Two-party-preferred result
Labor	Peter Cleeland	28,789	52.1	+0.3
Liberal	Brian Dixon	26,483	47.9	−0.3
Labor hold		Swing	+0.3	

=== McMillan ===
1984 Australian federal election: McMillan
Party	Candidate	Votes	%	±%
Labor	Barry Cunningham	31,517	53.5	+4.1
Liberal	John Dwyer	19,559	33.2	−5.2
National	Heather Ronald	3,580	6.1	+1.4
Democrats	James Richards	2,509	4.3	−1.5
Democratic Labor	Anne Barrett	1,732	2.9	+1.2
Total formal votes		58,897	93.0	
Informal votes		4,415	7.0	
Turnout		63,312	96.3	
Two-party-preferred result
Labor	Barry Cunningham	34,182	58.0	+4.1
Liberal	John Dwyer	24,705	42.0	−4.1
Labor hold		Swing	+4.1	

=== Melbourne ===
1984 Australian federal election: Melbourne
Party	Candidate	Votes	%	±%
Labor	Gerry Hand	37,639	65.1	+1.4
Liberal	Ian Davis	12,856	22.2	−1.4
Democrats	Chris Carter	4,107	7.1	−3.2
Imperial British	James Ferrari	2,068	3.6	+3.6
Democratic Labor	Michael Hammet	1,174	2.0	+2.0
Total formal votes		57,844	89.3	
Informal votes		6,940	10.7	
Turnout		64,784	91.0	
Two-party-preferred result
Labor	Gerry Hand	40,461	70.0	−0.2
Liberal	Ian Davis	17,330	30.0	+0.2
Labor hold		Swing	−0.2	

=== Melbourne Ports ===
1984 Australian federal election: Melbourne Ports
Party	Candidate	Votes	%	±%
Labor	Clyde Holding	32,665	57.1	−3.6
Liberal	Allan Paull	17,603	30.8	−1.7
Democrats	Sue McDougall	3,312	5.8	+0.0
Democratic Labor	Michael Rowe	1,825	3.2	+3.2
Independent	Denice Stephens	845	1.5	+1.5
National	Dorothy Turner	795	1.4	+1.4
Independent	Russell Morse	159	0.3	+0.3
Total formal votes		57,204	88.1	
Informal votes		7,728	11.9	
Turnout		64,932	90.6	
Two-party-preferred result
Labor	Clyde Holding	36,690	64.2	+1.1
Liberal	Allan Paull	20,427	35.8	−1.1
Labor hold		Swing	+1.1	

=== Menzies ===
1984 Australian federal election: Menzies
Party	Candidate	Votes	%	±%
Liberal	Neil Brown	28,395	50.6	+1.6
Labor	David McKenzie	22,901	40.8	−2.2
Democrats	Lynden Kenyon	3,519	6.3	+0.0
Democratic Labor	Vin Considine	1,306	2.3	+0.9
Total formal votes		56,121	92.7	
Informal votes		4,388	7.3	
Turnout		60,509	96.0	
Two-party-preferred result
Liberal	Neil Brown	31,264	55.7	+2.3
Labor	David McKenzie	24,840	44.3	−2.3
Liberal notional hold		Swing	+2.3	

=== Murray ===
1984 Australian federal election: Murray
Party	Candidate	Votes	%	±%
National	Bruce Lloyd	35,681	58.3	+5.2
Labor	Mark Anderson	15,034	24.6	+0.0
Liberal	Anne Adams	7,484	12.2	−5.0
Democrats	John Weir	2,096	3.4	−0.5
Democratic Labor	Desmond Semmel	887	1.4	+1.4
Total formal votes		61,182	93.6	
Informal votes		4,195	6.4	
Turnout		65,377	96.1	
Two-party-preferred result
National	Bruce Lloyd	44,734	73.1	+2.0
Labor	Mark Anderson	16,433	26.9	−2.0
National hold		Swing	+2.0	

=== Scullin ===
1984 Australian federal election: Scullin
Party	Candidate	Votes	%	±%
Labor	Harry Jenkins	36,513	71.5	+2.3
Liberal	Pamela Philpot	9,448	18.5	−3.9
Democrats	Jane Green	3,444	6.7	+2.1
Democratic Labor	Helen Walsh	1,635	3.2	+3.2
Total formal votes		51,040	85.9	
Informal votes		8,369	14.1	
Turnout		59,409	95.2	
Two-party-preferred result
Labor	Harry Jenkins	39,606	77.6	+2.2
Liberal	Pamela Philpot	11,416	22.4	−2.2
Labor hold		Swing	+2.2	

=== Streeton ===
1984 Australian federal election: Streeton
Party	Candidate	Votes	%	±%
Labor	Tony Lamb	27,239	49.0	+0.0
Liberal	Russell Broadbent	21,798	39.2	+0.3
Democrats	Tessa Cunningham	4,133	7.4	−1.1
National	John Clifford	1,538	2.8	+2.8
Democratic Labor	David Grulke	852	1.5	+0.4
Total formal votes		55,560	92.1	
Informal votes		4,766	7.9	
Turnout		60,326	94.7	
Two-party-preferred result
Labor	Tony Lamb	29,626	53.3	−0.9
Liberal	Russell Broadbent	25,920	46.7	+0.9
Labor notional hold		Swing	−0.9	

=== Wannon ===
1984 Australian federal election: Wannon
Party	Candidate	Votes	%	±%
Liberal	David Hawker	36,748	58.4	−3.0
Labor	Nancy Genardini	20,130	32.0	−1.8
National	Betty Gee	3,294	5.2	+5.2
Democrats	Kathleen May	1,683	2.7	−2.5
Democratic Labor	Bill Verhoef	1,115	1.8	+1.8
Total formal votes		62,970	95.3	
Informal votes		3,096	4.7	
Turnout		66,066	96.5	
Two-party-preferred result
Liberal	David Hawker	41,198	65.4	+1.9
Labor	Nancy Genardini	21,755	34.6	−1.9
Liberal hold		Swing	+1.9	

=== Wills ===
1984 Australian federal election: Wills
Party	Candidate	Votes	%	±%
Labor	Bob Hawke	38,846	66.5	+1.5
Liberal	Victor Perton	13,649	23.4	−1.1
Democrats	Peter Allan	2,350	4.0	−2.3
Independent	Mark Ferguson	1,360	2.3	+2.3
Independent	Lance Hutchinson	1,056	1.8	+1.8
Democratic Labor	Gloria Brook	856	1.5	−0.2
Independent	Martin Mantell	242	0.4	+0.4
Independent	Glen Mann	81	0.1	+0.1
Total formal votes		58,440	89.2	
Informal votes		7,097	10.8	
Turnout		65,537	94.2	
Two-party-preferred result
Labor	Bob Hawke	40,986	70.3	−1.2
Liberal	Victor Perton	17,352	29.7	+1.2
Labor hold		Swing	−1.2	

== See also ==
- Results of the 1984 Australian federal election (House of Representatives)
- Members of the Australian House of Representatives, 1984–1987
