= Mac Holten =

Australian politician and sportsman

The Honourable Mac Holten CMG
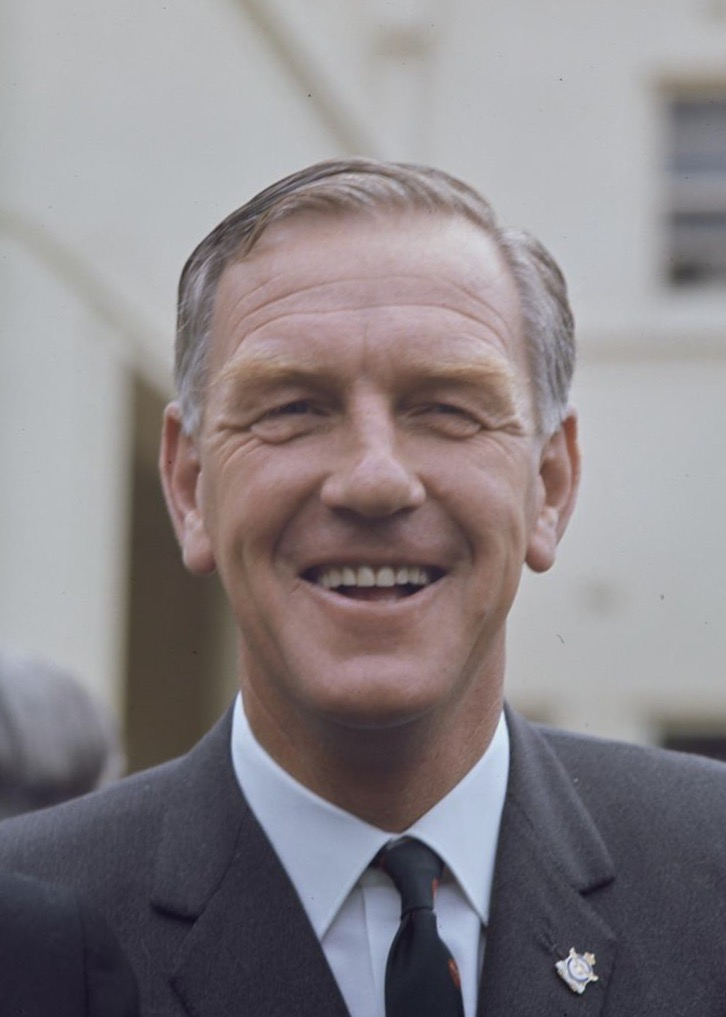

Minister for Repatriation
- In office 12 November 1969 – 5 December 1972
- Prime Minister: John Gorton; William McMahon
- Preceded by: Colin McKellar
- Succeeded by: Reg Bishop

Member of the Australian Parliament for Indi
- In office 22 November 1958 – 10 December 1977
- Preceded by: William Bostock
- Succeeded by: Ewen Cameron

Personal details
- Born: Rendle McNeilage Holten; 29 March 1922 Melbourne, Victoria, Australia
- Died: 12 October 1996 (aged 74)
- Party: Country
- Occupation: Footballer, Farmer

Rendle McNeilage "Mac" Holten CMG (29 March 1922 – 12 October 1996) was an Australian politician and sportsman. A member of the Country Party, he represented the Division of Indi in the House of Representatives from 1958 to 1977. Holten served as Minister for Repatriation from 1969 to 1972 under the Gorton and McMahon governments. Before entering politics, he played Australian rules football for the Collingwood Football Club.

== Early life and sporting career ==
Holten as a football player.

Holten was born in Melbourne and educated at Scotch College, Melbourne. He left school at 16 to sell life insurance, but with the outbreak of World War II, he joined the Royal Australian Air Force in 1940 as a flying instructor and test pilot. He retired in 1946 with the rank of Flight Lieutenant and became a grocer.

Holten kicked 83 goals in 82 games for Collingwood Football Club, where he played in three losing Preliminary Finals and represented Victoria in a match against the Riverina at Leeton, New South Wales in August 1948.

Holten was also Vice-Captain of the Melbourne Cricket Club at one time.

In January 1949, he married Shirley de Raven and moved to Wangaratta as captain-coach of the Wangaratta Football Club and led them to four consecutive Ovens & Murray Football League premierships from 1949 to 1952.

Holten played 54 first eleven matches for the Melbourne Cricket Club in the Melbourne District Cricket Association between 1943 and 1949 and continued playing cricket in Wangaratta, representing the Victorian Country Cricket League against England.

Holten was inducted into the Ovens & Murray Football League Hall of Fame in 2006 for his outstanding contribution to football both on and off the field.

== Politics ==
Holten was elected as the Country Party member for Indi in the Australian House of Representatives from the 1958 election until his defeat by the Liberal candidate at the 1977 election. He was the Minister for Repatriation from November 1969 to the McMahon government's defeat at the 1972 election. As minister, he introduced bills, the Native Members of the Forces Benefits Bill 1972 and the Repatriation (Torres Strait Islanders) Bill 1972, to abolish discrimination in the level of benefits for indigenous Australians who had served in World War II.

== Later life ==
Holten was the Administrator of Christmas Island from 1980 to 1982. He was appointed a Companion of the Order of St Michael and St George for his parliamentary and community service in 1980. He was survived by his wife, Shirley, and three daughters.

== Notes ==
Political offices
Preceded by Colin McKellar	Minister for Repatriation; 1969–72	Succeeded by Reg Bishop
Parliament of Australia
Preceded by Bill Bostock	Member for Indi; 1958–77	Succeeded by Ewen Cameron
