= Geoff Mosley =

John Geoffrey "Geoff" Mosley AM (born 14 September 1931) was executive director of the Australian Conservation Foundation from 1973 to 1986 and has had a lifelong interest in preserving wilderness. He has since been regularly elected from Victoria to the Council of the Australian Conservation Foundation as the only candidate in Victoria to receive a quota of first preference votes.

In 2005 he was made a Member of the Order of Australia in the Queen's Birthday Honours. In June, 2008 he was named as the Individual Award winner in the Australia World Environment Day 2008 Awards. In 2008, he also became the Australian director of the Centre for the Advancement of the Steady State Economy.
