= Ewen Cameron (Australian politician) =

Australian politician

Member of the Australian Parliament for Indi
- In office 10 December 1977 – 8 February 1993
- Preceded by: Mac Holten
- Succeeded by: Lou Lieberman

Personal details
- Born: 12 January 1930 (age 96) Melbourne, Victoria
- Party: Liberal Party of Australia
- Occupation: Farmer

Ewen Colin Cameron (born 12 January 1930) is a retired Australian politician. Born in Melbourne, he had been a farmer and member of Euroa Shire Council before entering federal politics. In 1977, he was elected to the Australian House of Representatives as the Liberal member for Indi, defeating Mac Holten, a member of the Liberals' Coalition partner the Country Party. He held the seat until his retirement in 1993.

== Early life ==
Cameron was born in Melbourne on 12 January 1930. He was educated at Scotch College, Melbourne.

Prior to entering politics, Cameron farmed near Euroa, Victoria. He was a director of the Euroa Co-operative Society and Euroa Clay Products, as well as president of the committee overseeing the Euroa Bush Nursing Hospital. He was active in the Country Fire Authority, serving on its board from 1976 to 1977 and as a senior vice-president of the Victorian Rural Fire Brigade Association.

== Politics ==
Cameron served as president of the Liberal Party's Euroa branch from 1963 to 1968 and was a delegate to state council. He also served on the Euroa Shire Council from 1964 to 1978.

At the 1977 federal election, Cameron won the seat of Indi for the Liberal Party from the incumbent National Country Party MP Mac Holten. He was re-elected on five occasions and retired at the 1993 election. He was active on a number of parliamentary committees.

In parliament, Cameron served as the Liberal Party's deputy whip from 1983 to 1985 and as whip from 1985 to 1989. He was responsible for announcing the results of the 1987 Liberal leadership spill, which saw incumbent leader John Howard defeat challenger Andrew Peacock.

Parliament of Australia
Preceded by Mac Holten	Member for Indi; 1977–1993	Succeeded by Lou Lieberman
