= Michael Duffy (Australian politician) =

Australian politician

The Honourable Michael Duffy ONZ
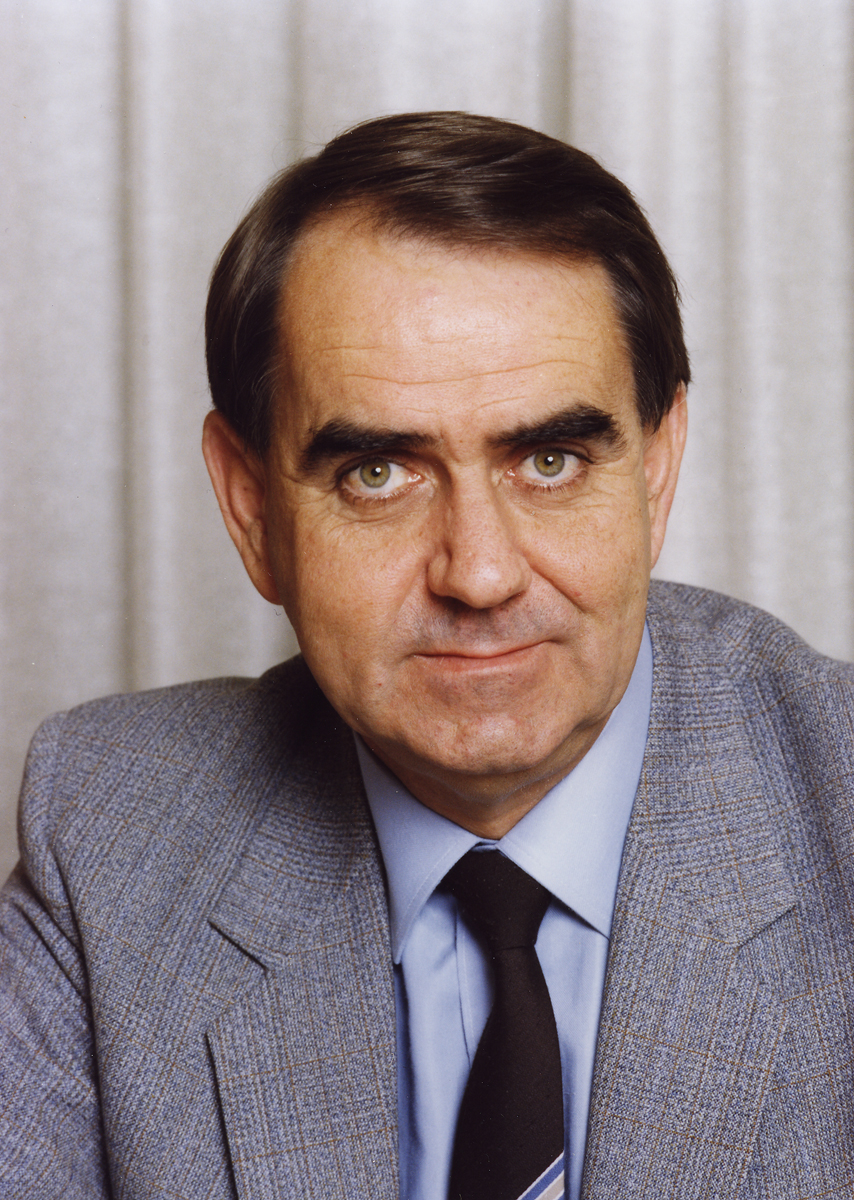

Attorney-General for Australia
- In office 4 April 1990 – 24 March 1993
- Prime Minister: Bob Hawke; Paul Keating
- Preceded by: Lionel Bowen
- Succeeded by: Duncan Kerr

Minister for Trade Negotiations
- In office 24 July 1987 – 4 April 1990
- Prime Minister: Bob Hawke
- Preceded by: John Dawkins
- Succeeded by: Neal Blewett

Minister for Communications
- In office 11 March 1983 – 24 July 1987
- Prime Minister: Bob Hawke
- Preceded by: Neil Brown
- Succeeded by: Gareth Evans

Member of the Australian Parliament for Holt
- In office 18 October 1980 – 29 January 1996
- Preceded by: William Yates
- Succeeded by: Gareth Evans

Personal details
- Born: Michael John Duffy; 2 March 1938 (age 88) Mildura, Victoria, Australia
- Party: Labor
- Education: University of Melbourne
- Occupation: Lawyer

Michael John Duffy ONZ (born 2 March 1938) is a former Australian politician and lawyer. He was a senior minister in the Australian Labor Party (ALP) governments from 1983 to 1993, serving as Minister for Communications (1983–1987), Minister for Trade Negotiations (1987–1990), and Attorney-General (1990–1993). He was a member of the House of Representatives from 1980 to 1996, representing the Victorian seat of Holt.

== Early life ==
Duffy was born on 2 March 1938 in Mildura, Victoria. His father was born in Ireland and worked as a manager at an insurance company.

Duffy spent his early years in Mildura and in Albury, New South Wales, where he attended the Christian Brothers' College. He went on to the University of Melbourne, graduating wih a Bachelor of Laws. Prior to entering politics he worked as a solicitor in Dandenong, Melbourne.

== Politics ==
Duffy was first elected as a delegate to ALP state conference in 1971 and joined the state administrative committee at the 1973. After an initial unsuccessful attempt at the 1977 federal election, he was elected to the House of Representatives at the 1980 election, winning the seat of Holt from the incumbent Liberal MP William Yates.

Duffy was described in 1977 as "a leader of the party's right wing". However, he was later identified as factionally unaligned but part of the informal "Victorian Independents" group within the ALP, along with John Button, Barry Jones and Jim Kennan.

=== Communications minister, 1983–1987 ===
Duffy was appointed Minister for Communications following the ALP's victory at the 1983 federal election. In cabinet he opposed moves to privatise AUSSAT, the government-owned satellite company, and attempts to revoke the independence of statutory agencies Australia Post and Telecom Australia. He sought to maintain media diversity by preventing major television networks from securing licences in regional areas.

=== Trade minister, 1987–1990 ===
Following the 1987 federal election, Duffy was appointed Minister for Trade Negotiations, Minister Assisting the Minister for Industry, Technology and Commerce; and Minister Assisting the Minister for Primary Industries and Energy. He was promoted to cabinet in January 1988.

On 6 February 1990, in recognition of work on the Closer Economic Relations agreement between Australia and New Zealand Duffy was the first Australian and fifteenth appointee to The Order of New Zealand. In 1990 he was also awarded the New Zealand 1990 Commemoration Medal.

=== Attorney-General, 1990–1993 ===
Duffy was appointed Attorney-General in a reshuffle of the Hawke ministry following the 1990 election. He introduced the legislation that became the Corporate Law Act 1992, which saw significant changes to financial reporting, insider trading laws, directors' duties, related party transactions, and stock trade settlements. The Australian Financial Review wrote in the same year that "Duffy in two years has brought more changes to the regulations governing business in Australia than others brought in as many decades", although he stated that many of the changes to legislation had already been in the pipeline when he took office.

In 1992, Duffy played a key role in overturning the Australian Defence Force's ban on openly gay members. Although defence minister Robert Ray had initially announced the ban would continue, Duffy brought the matter before the cabinet as a whole, arguing that Australia was in breach of its obligations under international law. A majority of cabinet sided with his view and the ban was overturned in November 1992.

== Later activities ==
Duffy later served as the chairman of the board of directors for Racing Victoria.

Political offices
Preceded by Neil Brown	Minister for Communications; 1983–1987	Succeeded by Gareth Evans
Preceded by John Dawkins	Minister for Trade Negotiations; 1987–1990	Succeeded by Neal Blewett
Preceded by Lionel Bowen	Attorney-General; 1990–1993	Succeeded by Duncan Kerr
Parliament of Australia
Preceded by William Yates	Member for Holt; 1980–1996	Succeeded by Gareth Evans
