= Stewart McArthur =

Australian politician

Stewart McArthur AM

Member of the Australian Parliament for Corangamite
- In office 18 February 1984 – 24 November 2007
- Preceded by: Tony Street
- Succeeded by: Darren Cheeseman

Personal details
- Born: 27 October 1937 (age 88) Melbourne, Victoria
- Party: Liberal Party of Australia
- Spouse: Bev McArthur (m. 1985)
- Education: Jesus College, Cambridge (MA)
- Occupation: Company director

Fergus Stewart McArthur, AM (born 27 October 1937) is a former Australian politician who served as a Liberal Party of Australia member of the Australian House of Representatives from February 1984, representing the Division of Corangamite, Victoria until his defeat in the 2007 election by Labor's Darren Cheeseman. He was born in Melbourne, Victoria, and was educated at The Geelong College and then at Cambridge University, where he gained a master's degree. He was a farmer and company director before entering politics. Stewart McArthur and his wife Bev McArthur have a daughter, Sarah, and twin sons, Andrew (killed after being struck by a vehicle when cycling in 2018) and James.

He was an advocate for federal funding towards a $26 million redevelopment of the Kardinia Park stadium, despite it being located outside his electorate.

Parliament of Australia
Preceded by Tony Street	Member for Corangamite; 1984–2007	Succeeded by Darren Cheeseman
