= Imperial British Conservative Party =

Farcical political party in New Zealand

The Imperial British Conservative Party was a farcical political party founded by The Wizard of New Zealand in 1974. It "stood for the traditions of British imperialism in the face of capitalism, globalisation and the distinct lack of culture in Christchurch, New Zealand." It was still operating in 1984, though news reports also referred to it as The Wizard Party.

The party contested the 1975 election on a platform of conserving the monarchy, waging a fourth world war using votes and notices of motion to convert everyone to the British way of life, and the elimination of work to strengthen the family. It planned to stand a dozen candidates. The party stood a candidate in the 1976 Nelson by-election, where a tabulation error in their final results was attributed to a "hex" placed by the Wizard.

For the 1978 election it changed its name to the Tory Party. It later ran a candidate in the 1980 Onehunga by-election.

At the 1984 election it ran a candidate against Geoffrey Palmer. It also ran candidates at the 1987 election.

== Activity in Australia ==
The Imperial British Conservative Party also had a presence in Australia, especially during the republican debate of the 1990s. The party ran three candidates at the 1983 Australian federal election.

One of its candidates, Cecil G. Murgatroyd, had run for parliament in several Australian federal elections, at each time standing against the Prime Minister (initially Bob Hawke), and in the 1992 Wills by-election after Hawke resigned from parliament. In official statements, Murgatroyd listed his occupation as "dole bludger". At other times, Murgatroyd stood under the banner of another New Zealand joke party, the McGillicuddy Serious Party.

In one Australian election in the 1980s, the party promised to dye the Speaker's wig a conservative blue.

Another candidate, James Ferrari (at one point contesting as Jim Ferrari) ran for the party in the seat of Melbourne at every election from 1980 until 2001.
