= Alan Griffiths =

Australian politician (born 1952)

The Honourable Alan Griffiths

Minister for Industry, Technology and Regional Development
- In office 24 March 1993 – 22 January 1994
- Prime Minister: Paul Keating
- Preceded by: John Button
- Succeeded by: Peter Cook

Minister for Tourism
- In office 27 December 1991 – 24 March 1993
- Prime Minister: Paul Keating
- Preceded by: Ros Kelly
- Succeeded by: Michael Lee

Minister for Resources
- In office 4 April 1990 – 24 March 1993
- Prime Minister: Bob Hawke; Paul Keating
- Preceded by: Peter Cook
- Succeeded by: Michael Lee

Member of the Australian Parliament for Maribyrnong
- In office 5 March 1983 – 29 January 1996
- Preceded by: Moss Cass
- Succeeded by: Bob Sercombe

Personal details
- Born: 4 September 1952 (age 74) Melbourne, Victoria, Australia
- Party: Labor
- Education: Monash University
- Occupation: Economist

Alan Gordon Griffiths (born 4 September 1952) is an Australian former politician who represented the Division of Maribyrnong for the Australian Labor Party from March 1983 to January 1996. Griffiths was a senior Minister in the Hawke and Keating governments and is now a businessman and non-executive director. Griffiths specialises in commercialising new technologies, including the road alignment software, Quantm, which has been used on Australasian, US and Asian infrastructure projects.

== Early life ==
Born in Melbourne, Griffiths was one of 11 children, raised in Traralgon in the Latrobe Valley in Victoria. He left home at the age of 14 and entered the workforce as a scaffolder and rigger. Griffiths subsequently worked in a variety of jobs before entering politics, including as a taxi driver, political adviser and lawyer. At one point he worked as a powder monkey in the South Australian desert

Griffiths showed early entrepreneurial flair. In the early 1970s, while working in a shipyard, he raffled his first pay check, selling tickets to workmates and earning well above the value of his wage.

By 20 he was married and a father to two girls and, although he had left school early, Griffiths was determined to have an education. He entered university on a scholarship and worked as a taxi driver to support his family while he studied.

Griffiths graduated from Monash University in 1979 with a Bachelor of Economics and a Bachelor of Laws.

Griffiths' first contact with politics came in the early 1980s, when he worked in the office of then New South Wales Premier, Neville Wran, before being elected to the Federal seat of Maribyrnong in 1983.

== Political career ==
=== Ministries held ===
Entering the parliament in 1983, Griffiths became the Minister for Resources in 1990, the Minister for Tourism in 1991 and the Minister for Industry, Technology and Regional Development in 1993.

It was reported that in just two years in the Resources portfolio, Griffiths "pushed through reforms in a staggering number of areas. Resource rent taxes, expanded offshore oil exploration, quarantine and inspection, food quality, national power supply policies and forest development are but a few of the reforms". Griffiths was also quoted as favouring "sensible economic development" and saying that Australia "needs a development ethic".

During his time in the Tourism portfolio, Griffiths urged more private investment in tourism infrastructure if Australia was to grow as a major tourist destination. He said the Australian Tourist Commission would focus on promoting Australia as a destination for travelers with special interests in sport, the environment, culture, arts, food and wine and that the Commonwealth Department of Tourism was examining ways to give tourists more opportunities to enjoy Aboriginal culture.

At the time of his appointment to the Industry portfolio, Griffiths was described as "the big winner out of Paul Keating's ministerial reshuffle". While in this portfolio, the development of Australia's regional areas was a key focus, including the establishment of the Task Force on Regional Development, which visited 60 regions across the country to hear community ideas for local development. The Task Force, which was instructed to examine the differing effects of industry and economic structural change between regions, was led by the then ACTU Secretary, Bill Kelty and reported back to Griffiths in December 1993.

=== Committee service ===
Griffiths was a member of the House of Representatives Standing Committee on Privileges from 1983 to 1984, the Legal and Constitutional Affairs Committee from 1987 to 1990 and the Industry, Science and Technology Committee from 1994 to 1996. Griffiths also served on the Joint Statutory National Crime Authority Committee from 1984 to 1987 and the Joint Select Committee on Electoral Reform from 1983 to 1984.

As Chair of the Legal and Constitutional Affairs Committee in 1989, Griffiths headed a government inquiry into insider trading. Griffiths told the media at the time that anecdotal evidence suggested there was a wide spectrum of involvement in areas of insider trading in the business community and it was therefore incumbent upon governments to ensure they took whatever steps were available to prevent that sort of business behavior.

Griffiths also chaired a Legal and Constitutional Affairs Committee inquiry into progress made towards the achievement of equal opportunity and equal status for Australian women, to mark the fifth anniversary of the enactment of the Sex Discrimination Act in Australia.

Griffiths said at the outset of the inquiry that "anyone who takes seriously the issue of the status of women and opportunities for women in Australian society, will concede readily that vis-à-vis the male of the species, they are, in most areas, at something of a disadvantage. It's a moot point of course, the extent to which legislation can change the objective circumstances and the subtle forms of discrimination that they face, but certainly very few people with an interest in the area would argue that you shouldn't have things like sex discrimination legislation and affirmative action legislation".

Griffiths went on to say that while more opportunities were opening up for women, the inquiry wanted to find ways "to ensure that the Parliament has an ongoing role in trying to bring about...the impetus for change".

=== Conferences and delegations ===
Member, Parliamentary Delegation to the European Parliamentary Institutions, Strasbourg, Brussels and the Federal Republic of Germany, September 1986. Official visits to Indonesia, South Korea and Japan, December 1990; Bali, February 1991; Papua New Guinea, April 1991; Italy, France, Poland, USSR and UK, July 1991; Tahiti, Chile and USA, October–November 1991; Hong Kong and Japan, March–April 1992; New Zealand, April 1992; Brazil and USA, June 1992; Spain, UK and USA, July 1992; Indonesia and Singapore, September–October 1992; Taiwan and Hong Kong, October–November 1992; Indonesia, November 1992; Vietnam, December 1992; Japan, Malaysia and Hong Kong, June–July 1993; Indonesia, September 1993; Japan and China, October–November 1993. Member, Parliamentary Delegation to USA and Canada, March–April 1995.

=== Sandwich Shop Affair ===
In 1994, Griffiths resigned as Minister for Industry, Technology and Regional Development after the "Sandwich Shop Affair" came to light. It was alleged that ALP funds, resources and staff wages from Griffiths' electoral office were used to bail out his business partner from a failed sandwich shop venture in Melbourne's Moonee Ponds. An inquiry by the former head of the Department of Prime Minister, Mike Codd, into the scandal cleared Griffiths of any wrongdoing. Griffiths was also cleared of any wrongdoing by the Australian Federal Police, who were alerted to the matter by Griffiths. Despite being cleared by the Codd inquiry – an investigation which Griffiths had also requested – he announced at the Victorian ALP Conference in April 1995 that he would not contest the 1996 election, which Labor lost. In his resignation speech, Griffiths acknowledged the allegations had taken "a lot of momentum out of my career". But he had waited for "total vindication" before declaring his resignation. "I am in the happy situation of being totally vindicated," he told the media at the time. "I spoke to the Prime Minister this morning who I might say tried to talk me out of announcing my resignation and who confirmed his previous public commitment that I would return to the Cabinet as soon as possible. But there is life after politics, and I intend to pursue life after politics." In a statement, then prime minister Paul Keating praised Griffiths' contribution to the parliament and the cabinet from the time of his election in 1983. "It has always been my expectation and hope that the current inquiry into those matters will clear Alan Griffiths of any wrongdoing," Keating said. "Alan Griffiths would have had sufficient support among his parliamentary colleagues to return to the ministry in due course. I would certainly have welcomed his return to Cabinet." At the time, Codd had offered to give the prime minister an interim report which could have cleared the way for Griffiths to make an early return to the Cabinet. But the prime minister declined, preferring to await the final report which would take several more months.

== After politics ==
=== Quantm ===
After leaving politics, Griffiths founded a technology company, Quantm, based on a computer program developed by CSIRO. It automates the process through which roads and railways are designed and costed and presents the planner with a range of options. The technology has been used to reduce costs in a number of countries.

Griffiths, the majority owner and founder of Quantm, and the Quantm board in 2006 agreed to sell the company to an arm of a U.S. construction conglomerate, Trimble Navigation Ltd, for what was believed to be a multi-million dollar price tag to pursue other entrepreneurial business ventures, including a United Kingdom-based high technology business. In early 2006, Quantm was selected by the National Cooperative Highway Research Program – Transportation Research Board as one of eight technologies enabling highway and railroad planners to successfully factor in environmental concerns in transportation decisions

=== Shopitize ===
Since 2010, Griffiths has been Executive Chairman of Shopitize based in the UK. The technology uses data from shopper dockets to provide FMCG companies with statistics that can help brands to better understand consumer spending habits across channels at the level of individual products and provide more targeted offers. The Shopitize platform enables Griffiths is a co-founder of Shopitize, with former banker Irina Pafomova, and former management consultant Dr. Alexey Andriyanenko. The technology platform is reported to have attracted significant funding from international investors.

=== Other roles ===
In December 2010, Griffiths was appointed as a non-executive director of Guildford Coal Limited.

In addition to his business activities since leaving politics, Griffiths has been involved in public policy and philanthropic work as a member of the President's Council of the Brussels-based International Crisis Group.

Political offices
Preceded by Peter Cook	Minister for Resources; 1990–93	Succeeded by Michael Lee
Preceded by Ros Kelly	Minister for Tourism; 1991–93	Succeeded by Michael Lee
Preceded by John Button	Minister for Industry, Technology and Regional Development; 1993–94	Succeeded by Peter Cook
Parliament of Australia
Preceded by Moss Cass	Member for Maribyrnong; 1983–96	Succeeded by Bob Sercombe
