= Electoral results for the Division of McMillan =

Election results in Division of McMillan, Australia

This is a list of electoral results for the Division of McMillan in Australian federal elections from the division's creation in 1949 until its abolition in 2019.

== Members ==
Member	Party	Term
Geoffrey Brown	Liberal	1949–1955
Alex Buchanan	Liberal	1955–1972
Alex Buchanan	Independent	1972–1972
Arthur Hewson	Country/National Country	1972–1975
Barry Simon	Liberal	1975–1980
Barry Cunningham	Labor	1980–1990
John Riggall	Liberal	1990–1993
Barry Cunningham	Labor	1993–1996
Russell Broadbent	Liberal	1996–1998
Christian Zahra	Labor	1998–2004
Russell Broadbent	Liberal	2004–2019

== Election results ==
=== Elections in the 2010s ===
==== 2016 ====
2016 Australian federal election: McMillan
Party	Candidate	Votes	%	±%
Liberal	Russell Broadbent	48,304	47.86	−2.50
Labor	Chris Buckingham	29,531	29.26	+4.21
Greens	Donna Lancaster	9,810	9.72	+2.10
Family First	Nathan Harding	3,418	3.39	+1.38
Animal Justice	Jennifer McAdam	3,022	2.99	+2.99
Rise Up Australia	Norman Baker	2,786	2.76	+2.09
Liberal Democrats	Jim McDonald	2,289	2.27	+2.27
Christians	Kathleen Ipsen	1,761	1.74	+1.74
Total formal votes		100,921	94.29	+0.40
Informal votes		6,115	5.71	−0.40
Turnout		107,036	92.11	−2.53
Two-party-preferred result
Liberal	Russell Broadbent	56,543	56.03	−5.80
Labor	Chris Buckingham	44,378	43.97	+5.80
Liberal hold		Swing	−5.80	

==== 2013 ====
2013 Australian federal election: McMillan
Party	Candidate	Votes	%	±%
Liberal	Russell Broadbent	47,316	50.36	+1.31
Labor	Anthony Naus	23,537	25.05	−10.71
Greens	Malcolm McKelvie	7,157	7.62	−2.09
Palmer United	Matthew Sherry	4,380	4.66	+4.66
Katter's Australian	David Amor	2,262	2.41	+2.41
Sex Party	Benjamin Staggard	2,168	2.31	+2.20
Family First	Luke Conlon	1,893	2.01	−1.24
Democratic Labour	Andrew Kis-Rigo	1,641	1.75	+1.75
Independent	John Parker	1,245	1.33	+1.33
Country Alliance	Ross Fisher	822	0.87	+0.87
Independent	Leigh Gatt	695	0.74	−1.35
Rise Up Australia	Norman Baker	627	0.67	+0.67
Senator Online	Gary Patton	209	0.22	+0.22
Total formal votes		93,952	93.89	−2.15
Informal votes		6,118	6.11	+2.15
Turnout		100,070	94.64	+0.34
Two-party-preferred result
Liberal	Russell Broadbent	58,095	61.83	+7.62
Labor	Anthony Naus	35,857	38.17	−7.62
Liberal hold		Swing	+7.62	

==== 2010 ====
2010 Australian federal election: McMillan
Party	Candidate	Votes	%	±%
Liberal	Russell Broadbent	41,870	49.28	−0.65
Labor	Christine Maxfield	30,212	35.56	−2.58
Greens	Malcolm McKelvie	8,258	9.72	+3.72
Family First	Linden Stokes	2,776	3.27	+0.33
Independent	Leigh Gatt	1,844	2.17	+2.17
Total formal votes		84,960	96.03	−0.54
Informal votes		3,511	3.97	+0.54
Turnout		88,471	94.80	−1.08
Two-party-preferred result
Liberal	Russell Broadbent	46,229	54.41	−0.38
Labor	Christine Maxfield	38,731	45.59	+0.38
Liberal hold		Swing	−0.38	

=== Elections in the 2000s ===
==== 2007 ====
2007 Australian federal election: McMillan
Party	Candidate	Votes	%	±%
Liberal	Russell Broadbent	40,254	49.93	+7.00
Labor	Christine Maxfield	30,743	38.14	+0.28
Greens	Sandra Betts	4,839	6.00	+1.52
Family First	Terry Aeschlimann	2,370	2.94	+1.23
Democrats	Don Walters	1,206	1.50	+0.65
Democratic Labor	Suryan Chandrasegaran	775	0.96	+0.61
Citizens Electoral Council	Theo Alblas	287	0.36	+0.19
Liberty & Democracy	Ben Fiechtner	141	0.17	+0.17
Total formal votes		80,615	96.57	+1.06
Informal votes		2,859	3.43	−1.06
Turnout		83,474	95.85	−0.04
Two-party-preferred result
Liberal	Russell Broadbent	44,172	54.79	−0.20
Labor	Christine Maxfield	36,443	45.21	+0.20
Liberal hold		Swing	−0.20	

==== 2004 ====
2004 Australian federal election: McMillan
Party	Candidate	Votes	%	±%
Liberal	Russell Broadbent	32,379	42.93	+13.80
Labor	Christian Zahra	28,555	37.86	+0.94
National	Bridget McKenzie	6,676	8.85	−7.74
Greens	Chris Aitken	3,381	4.48	−0.89
Family First	Harold Paul	1,289	1.71	+1.71
Independent	Howard Emanuel	1,079	1.43	+1.43
One Nation	A R Gizycki de Gozdawa	1,044	1.38	−2.55
Democrats	Julie Grant	638	0.85	−3.10
Democratic Labor	Greg Byrne	263	0.35	+0.35
Citizens Electoral Council	Graeme Reid	127	0.17	+0.10
Total formal votes		75,431	95.51	−0.25
Informal votes		3,543	4.49	+0.25
Turnout		78,974	95.89	−0.17
Two-party-preferred result
Liberal	Russell Broadbent	41,477	54.99	+2.15
Labor	Christian Zahra	33,954	45.01	−2.15
Liberal notional hold		Swing	+2.15	

The sitting member was Christian Zahra (Labor) however a redistribution made it a notional Liberal seat with a margin of 2.9%.

==== 2001 ====
2001 Australian federal election: McMillan
Party	Candidate	Votes	%	±%
Labor	Christian Zahra	35,238	44.48	+7.57
Liberal	Jim Forbes	31,532	39.80	+0.94
Democrats	David Wall	3,233	4.08	−0.17
Greens	Jenny Farrar	2,918	3.68	+1.51
One Nation	John Holtman	2,864	3.62	−1.61
National	David Roberts	2,172	2.74	+2.74
	Betty Howell	1,262	1.59	+1.59
Total formal votes		79,219	96.52	+0.63
Informal votes		2,853	3.48	−0.63
Turnout		82,072	96.44	
Two-party-preferred result
Labor	Christian Zahra	41,559	52.46	+1.89
Liberal	Jim Forbes	37,660	47.54	−1.89
Labor hold		Swing	+1.89	

=== Elections in the 1990s ===
==== 1998 ====
1998 Australian federal election: McMillan
Party	Candidate	Votes	%	±%
Liberal	Russell Broadbent	29,512	38.91	−1.20
Labor	Christian Zahra	27,995	36.91	−3.95
One Nation	Bryan Atkin	3,963	5.22	+5.22
Independent	Barry Cunningham	3,800	5.01	+5.01
Democrats	David Wall	3,228	4.26	−0.81
Shooters	Peter Kelly	2,954	3.89	+3.89
Australia First	Peter Wells	2,036	2.68	+2.68
Greens	Jenny Farrar	1,645	2.17	−0.50
Independent	Anthony Geoghegan	352	0.46	+0.46
Unity	Colin Milne	247	0.33	+0.33
Natural Law	Peter Jackson	116	0.15	−0.07
Total formal votes		75,848	95.89	−1.40
Informal votes		3,251	4.11	+1.40
Turnout		79,099	96.53	−0.31
Two-party-preferred result
Labor	Christian Zahra	38,360	50.57	+2.64
Liberal	Russell Broadbent	37,488	49.43	−2.64
Labor gain from Liberal		Swing	+2.64	

==== 1996 ====
1996 Australian federal election: McMillan
Party	Candidate	Votes	%	±%
Labor	Barry Cunningham	31,115	40.86	−4.92
Liberal	Russell Broadbent	30,546	40.11	−2.38
National	Helen Hoppner	6,206	8.15	+6.93
Democrats	Colin Thornby	3,869	5.07	+1.66
Greens	Luke van der Meulen	2,031	2.67	+2.67
Independent	Dave Smith	878	1.15	+1.15
Call to Australia	Norman Baker	818	1.07	+1.07
Independent	Chris King	526	0.69	+0.69
Natural Law	Michael Pollock	170	0.22	−0.35
Total formal votes		76,149	97.39	−0.32
Informal votes		2,119	2.71	+0.32
Turnout		78,268	96.83	−0.09
Two-party-preferred result
Liberal	Russell Broadbent	39,333	52.07	+2.60
Labor	Barry Cunningham	36,210	47.93	−2.60
Liberal gain from Labor		Swing	+2.60	

==== 1993 ====
1993 Australian federal election: McMillan
Party	Candidate	Votes	%	±%
Labor	Barry Cunningham	34,295	45.66	+7.77
Liberal	John Riggall	32,939	43.86	+5.52
Independent	Helen Hoppner	4,385	5.84	+5.84
Democrats	David White	2,515	3.35	−6.86
Independent	Glen Mann	540	0.72	−0.05
Natural Law	Cathy Boschin	428	0.57	+0.57
Total formal votes		75,102	97.60	+0.31
Informal votes		1,848	2.40	−0.31
Turnout		76,950	96.92	
Two-party-preferred result
Labor	Barry Cunningham	37,793	50.40	+4.84
Liberal	John Riggall	37,200	49.60	−4.84
Labor gain from Liberal		Swing	+4.84	

==== 1990 ====
1990 Australian federal election: McMillan
Party	Candidate	Votes	%	±%
Liberal	John Riggall	27,224	38.3	+5.3
Labor	Barry Cunningham	26,903	37.9	−9.7
Democrats	Ross Ollquist	7,247	10.2	+4.9
National	Jillian Petersen	6,358	9.0	−3.1
Call to Australia	Michael Slaughter	2,726	3.8	+3.8
Independent	Glen Mann	544	0.8	+0.8
Total formal votes		71,002	97.3	
Informal votes		1,976	2.7	
Turnout		72,978	96.4	
Two-party-preferred result
Liberal	John Riggall	38,576	54.4	+7.4
Labor	Barry Cunningham	32,281	45.6	−7.4
Liberal gain from Labor		Swing	+7.4	

=== Elections in the 1980s ===
==== 1987 ====
1987 Australian federal election: McMillan
Party	Candidate	Votes	%	±%
Labor	Barry Cunningham	30,610	48.9	−4.6
Liberal	John Kiely	19,846	31.7	−1.5
National	Pat O'Brien	7,544	12.1	+6.0
Democrats	Ross Ollquist	3,319	5.3	+1.1
Independent	Anne Lorraine	833	1.3	+1.3
Independent	Thomas Walsh	404	0.6	+0.6
Total formal votes		62,556	96.2	
Informal votes		2,466	3.8	
Turnout		65,022	95.6	
Two-party-preferred result
Labor	Barry Cunningham	33,949	54.3	−3.8
Liberal	John Kiely	28,555	45.7	+3.8
Labor hold		Swing	−3.8	

==== 1984 ====
1984 Australian federal election: McMillan
Party	Candidate	Votes	%	±%
Labor	Barry Cunningham	31,517	53.5	+4.1
Liberal	John Dwyer	19,559	33.2	−5.2
National	Heather Ronald	3,580	6.1	+1.4
Democrats	James Richards	2,509	4.3	−1.5
Democratic Labor	Anne Barrett	1,732	2.9	+1.2
Total formal votes		58,897	93.0	
Informal votes		4,415	7.0	
Turnout		63,312	96.3	
Two-party-preferred result
Labor	Barry Cunningham	34,182	58.0	+4.1
Liberal	John Dwyer	24,705	42.0	−4.1
Labor hold		Swing	+4.1	

==== 1983 ====
1983 Australian federal election: McMillan
Party	Candidate	Votes	%	±%
Labor	Barry Cunningham	34,099	48.3	+5.4
Liberal	Greg Ross	27,831	39.5	−4.7
Democrats	Gloria Auchterlonie	4,062	5.8	−1.5
National	Stewart Robertson	3,317	4.7	+4.7
Democratic Labor	John Sellens	1,219	1.7	−3.3
Total formal votes		70,528	97.9	
Informal votes		1,548	2.1	
Turnout		72,076	96.2	
Two-party-preferred result
Labor	Barry Cunningham	37,433	53.1	+1.7
Liberal	Greg Ross	33,095	46.9	−1.7
Labor hold		Swing	+1.7	

==== 1980 ====
1980 Australian federal election: McMillan
Party	Candidate	Votes	%	±%
Liberal	Barry Simon	28,957	44.2	−0.3
Labor	Barry Cunningham	28,100	42.9	+7.5
Democrats	Sandra Burke	4,748	7.3	−6.9
Democratic Labor	Brian Handley	3,295	5.0	+0.2
Independent	Robert McCracken	378	0.6	+0.6
Total formal votes		65,478	97.3	
Informal votes		1,803	2.7	
Turnout		67,281	95.7	
Two-party-preferred result
Labor	Barry Cunningham	33,647	51.4	+6.2
Liberal	Barry Simon	31,831	48.6	−6.2
Labor gain from Liberal		Swing	+6.2	

=== Elections in the 1970s ===
==== 1977 ====
1977 Australian federal election: McMillan
Party	Candidate	Votes	%	±%
Liberal	Barry Simon	27,650	44.5	+11.9
Labor	Richard Elkington	21,999	35.4	−4.2
Democrats	Ronald Dent	8,844	14.2	+14.2
Democratic Labor	Brian Handley	3,010	4.8	+0.9
Independent	Norman Holyoak	667	1.1	+1.1
Total formal votes		62,170	97.1	
Informal votes		1,847	2.9	
Turnout		64,017	96.3	
Two-party-preferred result
Liberal	Barry Simon	34,077	54.8	−1.9
Labor	Richard Elkington	28,093	45.2	+1.9
Liberal hold		Swing	−1.9	

==== 1975 ====
1975 Australian federal election: McMillan
Party	Candidate	Votes	%	±%
Labor	William Rutherford	22,402	39.6	−4.3
Liberal	Barry Simon	18,415	32.6	+8.4
National Country	Arthur Hewson	12,971	22.9	−1.9
Democratic Labor	Les Hilton	2,227	3.9	−0.2
Independent	David Little	525	0.9	+0.9
Total formal votes		56,540	98.0	
Informal votes		1,182	2.0	
Turnout		57,722	95.4	
Two-party-preferred result
Liberal	Barry Simon	32,070	56.7	+56.7
Labor	William Rutherford	24,470	43.3	−2.1
Liberal gain from National Country		Swing	+2.1	

==== 1974 ====
1974 Australian federal election: McMillan
Party	Candidate	Votes	%	±%
Labor	Barry Murphy	24,201	43.9	−1.9
Country	Arthur Hewson	13,650	24.8	+8.2
Liberal	Ronald Dent	13,345	24.2	+0.1
Democratic Labor	Les Hilton	2,273	4.1	−3.1
Australia	Ronald Broadhurst	1,666	3.0	+3.0
Total formal votes		55,135	97.9	
Informal votes		1,177	2.1	
Turnout		56,312	96.3	
Two-party-preferred result
Country	Arthur Hewson	30,110	54.6	+2.2
Labor	Barry Murphy	25,025	45.4	−2.2
Country hold		Swing	+2.2	

==== 1972 ====
1972 Australian federal election: McMillan
Party	Candidate	Votes	%	±%
Labor	Frank Mountford	22,802	45.8	+3.7
Liberal	Barrie Armitage	12,025	24.1	−8.0
Country	Arthur Hewson	8,282	16.6	−0.3
Democratic Labor	Michael Houlihan	3,583	7.2	−1.8
Independent	Alex Buchanan	3,113	6.3	+6.3
Total formal votes		49,805	98.1	
Informal votes		962	1.9	
Turnout		50,767	96.5	
Two-party-preferred result
Country	Arthur Hewson	26,096	52.4	+52.4
Labor	Frank Mountford	23,709	47.6	+2.9
Country gain from Liberal		Swing	−2.9	

=== Elections in the 1960s ===
==== 1969 ====
1969 Australian federal election: McMillan
Party	Candidate	Votes	%	±%
Labor	Frank Mountford	20,390	42.1	+8.2
Liberal	Alex Buchanan	15,530	32.1	−18.5
Country	John Dwyer	8,164	16.9	+16.9
Democratic Labor	Les Hilton	4,337	9.0	−2.1
Total formal votes		48,421	97.6	
Informal votes		1,189	2.4	
Turnout		49,610	96.0	
Two-party-preferred result
Liberal	Alex Buchanan	26,795	55.3	−7.5
Labor	Frank Mountford	21,626	44.7	+7.5
Liberal hold		Swing	−7.5	

==== 1966 ====
1966 Australian federal election: McMillan
Party	Candidate	Votes	%	±%
Liberal	Alex Buchanan	22,857	50.4	+0.6
Labor	Eric Kent	15,449	34.1	−4.4
Democratic Labor	Les Hilton	5,040	11.1	−0.5
Independent	Thomas Yates	2,000	4.4	+4.4
Total formal votes		45,346	97.0	
Informal votes		1,397	3.0	
Turnout		46,743	96.2	
Two-party-preferred result
Liberal	Alex Buchanan		62.6	+2.2
Labor	Eric Kent		37.4	−2.2
Liberal hold		Swing	+2.2	

==== 1963 ====
1963 Australian federal election: McMillan
Party	Candidate	Votes	%	±%
Liberal	Alex Buchanan	22,479	49.8	+14.3
Labor	Eric Kent	17,377	38.5	+1.6
Democratic Labor	Les Hilton	5,243	11.6	+0.0
Total formal votes		45,099	99.0	
Informal votes		442	1.0	
Turnout		45,541	96.6	
Two-party-preferred result
Liberal	Alex Buchanan	27,221	60.4	−0.8
Labor	Eric Kent	17,878	39.6	+0.8
Liberal hold		Swing	−0.8	

==== 1961 ====
1961 Australian federal election: McMillan
Party	Candidate	Votes	%	±%
Labor	James Longstaff	15,907	36.9	−2.4
Liberal	Alex Buchanan	15,288	35.5	+5.4
Country	Francis Hawtin	6,758	15.7	−3.0
Democratic Labor	Les Hilton	4,988	11.6	+1.4
Republican	Patrick Linane	181	0.4	+0.4
Total formal votes		43,122	97.6	
Informal votes		1,078	2.4	
Turnout		44,200	95.3	
Two-party-preferred result
Liberal	Alex Buchanan	26,401	61.2	+4.0
Labor	James Longstaff	16,721	38.8	−4.0
Liberal hold		Swing	+4.0	

=== Elections in the 1950s ===
==== 1958 ====
1958 Australian federal election: McMillan
Party	Candidate	Votes	%	±%
Labor	George Brown	15,821	39.3	+4.7
Liberal	Alex Buchanan	12,113	30.1	−21.9
Country	Francis Hawtin	7,514	18.7	+18.7
Democratic Labor	Kevin Scanlon	4,123	10.2	−3.2
Communist	Wattie Doig	450	1.1	+1.1
Independent	Decima Mayne	210	0.5	+0.5
Total formal votes		40,231	95.2	
Informal votes		2,040	4.8	
Turnout		42,271	95.4	
Two-party-preferred result
Liberal	Alex Buchanan	23,031	57.2	−5.5
Labor	George Brown	17,200	42.8	+5.5
Liberal hold		Swing	−5.5	

==== 1955 ====
1955 Australian federal election: McMillan
Party	Candidate	Votes	%	±%
Liberal	Alex Buchanan	20,197	52.0	+10.7
Labor	Horace Hawkins	13,430	34.6	−8.3
Labor (A-C)	Desmond Devlin	5,193	13.4	+13.4
Total formal votes		38,820	97.6	
Informal votes		969	2.4	
Turnout		39,789	94.5	
Two-party-preferred result
Liberal	Alex Buchanan		62.7	+7.3
Labor	Horace Hawkins		37.3	−7.3
Liberal hold		Swing	+7.3	

==== 1954 ====
1954 Australian federal election: McMillan
Party	Candidate	Votes	%	±%
Labor	Desmond Devlin	17,989	43.2	+2.4
Liberal	Geoffrey Brown	17,054	41.0	−14.7
Country	John McDonald	5,790	13.9	+13.9
Communist	Bob Hamilton	776	1.9	−1.5
Total formal votes		41,609	98.4	
Informal votes		694	1.6	
Turnout		42,303	95.2	
Two-party-preferred result
Liberal	Geoffrey Brown	22,314	53.6	−2.4
Labor	Desmond Devlin	19,295	46.4	+2.4
Liberal hold		Swing	−2.4	

==== 1951 ====
1951 Australian federal election: McMillan
Party	Candidate	Votes	%	±%
Liberal	Geoffrey Brown	21,465	55.7	+23.3
Labor	Horace Hawkins	15,717	40.8	+2.1
Communist	Fred Charlesworth	1,328	3.4	+0.9
Total formal votes		38,510	98.1	
Informal votes		747	1.9	
Turnout		39,257	95.7	
Two-party-preferred result
Liberal	Geoffrey Brown		56.0	−0.9
Labor	Horace Hawkins		44.0	+0.9
Liberal hold		Swing	−0.9	

=== Elections in the 1940s ===
==== 1949 ====
1949 Australian federal election: McMillan
Party	Candidate	Votes	%	±%
Labor	Adam Keltie	14,263	38.7	−3.6
Liberal	Geoffrey Brown	11,938	32.4	+6.5
Country	Bob May	9,714	26.4	−0.6
Communist	Bob Hamilton	912	2.5	−2.2
Total formal votes		36,827	98.0	
Informal votes		758	2.0	
Turnout		37,585	95.6	
Two-party-preferred result
Liberal	Geoffrey Brown	20,960	56.9	+6.1
Labor	Adam Keltie	15,867	43.1	−6.1
Liberal notional gain from Country		Swing	+6.1	
