= Electoral results for the Division of Bruce =

Australian division election results

This is a list of electoral results for the Division of Bruce in Australian federal elections from the division's creation in 1955 until the present.

== Members ==
Member	Party	Term
(Sir) Billy Snedden	Liberal	1955–1983
Ken Aldred	Liberal	1983 by–1990
Julian Beale	Liberal	1990–1996
Alan Griffin	Labor	1996–2016
Julian Hill	Labor	2016–present

== Election results ==
=== Elections in the 2020s ===
==== 2025 ====
2025 Australian federal election: Bruce
Party	Candidate	Votes	%	±%
One Nation	Bianca Colecchia			
Greens	Rhonda Garad			
Labor	Julian Hill			
Libertarian	Christine Skrobo			
Liberal	Zahid Safi			
Trumpet of Patriots	Samuel James Anderson			
Legalise Cannabis	Andrew Louth			
Family First	Wendy Birchall			
Total formal votes				
Informal votes				
Turnout				

==== 2022 ====
2022 Australian federal election: Bruce
Party	Candidate	Votes	%	±%
Labor	Julian Hill	39,516	41.47	−6.57
Liberal	James Moody	28,837	30.26	−5.43
Greens	Matthew Kirwan	9,273	9.73	+2.10
United Australia	Matt Babet	8,299	8.71	+4.61
Liberal Democrats	Christine Skrobo	4,821	5.06	+5.06
One Nation	Hayley Deans	4,544	4.77	+3.75
Total formal votes		95,290	95.66	+0.76
Informal votes		4,321	4.34	−0.76
Turnout		99,611	88.34	−3.67
Two-party-preferred result
Labor	Julian Hill	53,920	56.59	−0.69
Liberal	James Moody	41,370	43.41	+0.69
Labor hold		Swing	−0.69	

Alluvial diagram for preference flows in the seat of Bruce in the 2022 federal election. indicates at what stage the winning candidate had over 50% of the votes and was declared the winner.

=== Elections in the 2010s ===
==== 2019 ====
2019 Australian federal election: Bruce
Party	Candidate	Votes	%	±%
Labor	Julian Hill	51,713	55.58	+1.41
Liberal	John MacIsaac	27,170	29.20	−1.12
Greens	Rhonda Garad	6,801	7.31	+0.77
United Australia	Mubahil Ahmed	3,979	4.28	+4.28
Conservative National	Tim Boyanton	3,377	3.63	+3.63
Total formal votes		93,040	94.40	−0.26
Informal votes		5,521	5.60	+0.26
Turnout		98,561	90.26	−0.85
Two-party-preferred result
Labor	Julian Hill	59,689	64.15	+0.10
Liberal	John MacIsaac	33,351	35.85	−0.10
Labor hold		Swing	+0.10	

==== 2016 ====
2016 Australian federal election: Bruce
Party	Candidate	Votes	%	±%
Labor	Julian Hill	36,804	44.34	+2.44
Liberal	Helen Kroger	33,248	40.05	−2.91
Greens	Stefanie Bauer	5,890	7.10	+0.46
Family First	Nathan Foggie	2,870	3.46	+0.81
Animal Justice	Douglas Leith	1,944	2.34	+2.34
Drug Law Reform	Alan Roncan	1,440	1.73	+1.73
Renewable Energy	Jill Jarvis-Wills	816	0.98	+0.98
Total formal votes		83,012	95.33	+0.83
Informal votes		4,064	4.67	−0.83
Turnout		87,076	90.01	−2.27
Two-party-preferred result
Labor	Julian Hill	44,894	54.08	+2.28
Liberal	Helen Kroger	38,118	45.92	−2.28
Labor hold		Swing	+2.28	

==== 2013 ====
2013 Australian federal election: Bruce
Party	Candidate	Votes	%	±%
Liberal	Emanuele Cicchiello	35,501	42.96	+5.24
Labor	Alan Griffin	34,626	41.90	−6.81
Greens	Lynette Keleher	5,491	6.64	−2.83
Family First	Rebecca Filliponi	2,186	2.65	−1.39
Palmer United	Paul Tuyau	2,173	2.63	+2.63
Democratic Labour	Geraldine Gonsalvez	1,334	1.61	+1.61
Independent	Kiry Uth	682	0.83	+0.83
Rise Up Australia	Robert White	652	0.79	+0.79
Total formal votes		82,645	94.50	−0.42
Informal votes		4,810	5.50	+0.42
Turnout		87,455	92.24	−0.18
Two-party-preferred result
Labor	Alan Griffin	42,812	51.80	−5.91
Liberal	Emanuele Cicchiello	39,833	48.20	+5.91
Labor hold		Swing	−5.91	

==== 2010 ====
2010 Australian federal election: Bruce
Party	Candidate	Votes	%	±%
Labor	Alan Griffin	37,794	49.24	−2.61
Liberal	Mike Kabos	28,580	37.24	−0.33
Greens	Stefan Zibell	7,222	9.41	+4.32
Family First	Felicity Hemmersbach	3,151	4.11	+1.26
Total formal votes		76,747	94.79	−1.50
Informal votes		4,220	5.21	+1.50
Turnout		80,967	91.83	−2.75
Two-party-preferred result
Labor	Alan Griffin	44,603	58.12	−0.20
Liberal	Mike Kabos	32,144	41.88	+0.20
Labor hold		Swing	−0.20	

=== Elections in the 2000s ===
==== 2007 ====
2007 Australian federal election: Bruce
Party	Candidate	Votes	%	±%
Labor	Alan Griffin	41,754	51.85	+4.55
Liberal	Angela Randall	30,257	37.57	−5.52
Greens	Rob Cassidy	4,102	5.09	−0.15
Family First	Bronwyn Rawlins	2,295	2.85	+0.22
Democrats	Richard Grossi	1,012	1.26	−0.12
Christian Democrats	Sandra Herrmann	678	0.84	+0.84
One Nation	Neil Smith	433	0.54	+0.54
Total formal votes		80,531	96.29	+0.72
Informal votes		3,106	3.71	−0.72
Turnout		83,637	94.62	+0.27
Two-party-preferred result
Labor	Alan Griffin	46,966	58.32	+4.84
Liberal	Angela Randall	33,565	41.68	−4.84
Labor hold		Swing	+4.84	

==== 2004 ====
2004 Australian federal election: Bruce
Party	Candidate	Votes	%	±%
Labor	Alan Griffin	37,109	47.30	−2.28
Liberal	Angela Randall	33,807	43.09	+3.61
Greens	Tania Giles	4,110	5.24	+1.07
Family First	Richard Warner	2,064	2.63	+2.63
Democrats	Paul van den Bergen	1,079	1.38	−5.10
Citizens Electoral Council	William Larner	282	0.36	+0.36
Total formal votes		78,451	95.57	−0.57
Informal votes		3,634	4.43	+0.57
Turnout		82,085	94.35	−0.95
Two-party-preferred result
Labor	Alan Griffin	41,954	53.48	−3.00
Liberal	Angela Randall	36,497	46.52	+3.00
Labor hold		Swing	−3.00	

==== 2001 ====
2001 Australian federal election: Bruce
Party	Candidate	Votes	%	±%
Labor	Alan Griffin	38,150	48.61	−0.05
Liberal	Reg Steel	31,813	40.54	+1.96
Democrats	Shaun Robyns	5,164	6.58	+0.56
Greens	David Collis	3,349	4.27	+2.74
Total formal votes		78,476	96.35	+0.04
Informal votes		2,969	3.65	−0.04
Turnout		81,445	95.62	
Two-party-preferred result
Labor	Alan Griffin	43,592	55.55	−1.17
Liberal	Reg Steel	34,884	44.45	+1.17
Labor hold		Swing	−1.17	

=== Elections in the 1990s ===
==== 1998 ====
1998 Australian federal election: Bruce
Party	Candidate	Votes	%	±%
Labor	Alan Griffin	38,165	48.66	+2.84
Liberal	Jim Wood	30,257	38.58	−7.05
Democrats	Adam McBeth	4,718	6.02	−0.08
One Nation	Laurence Lowe	2,296	2.93	+2.93
Unity	Toan Huynh	1,336	1.70	+1.70
Greens	Colin Smith	1,195	1.52	−0.49
Abolish Child Support	Dikran Chabdjian	253	0.32	+0.32
Natural Law	Michael Soos	209	0.27	−0.17
Total formal votes		78,429	96.31	−0.72
Informal votes		3,001	3.69	+0.72
Turnout		81,430	96.19	−0.26
Two-party-preferred result
Labor	Alan Griffin	44,485	56.72	+5.96
Liberal	Jim Wood	33,944	43.28	−5.96
Labor hold		Swing	+5.96	

==== 1996 ====
1996 Australian federal election: Bruce
Party	Candidate	Votes	%	±%
Labor	Alan Griffin	36,104	45.82	−1.50
Liberal	Julian Beale	35,954	45.63	−0.70
Democrats	Daryl Burkett	4,805	6.10	+1.65
Greens	Armen Bahlaw	1,586	2.01	+2.01
Natural Law	Michael Soos	343	0.44	−0.50
Total formal votes		78,792	97.04	+0.13
Informal votes		2,405	2.96	−0.13
Turnout		81,197	96.45	−0.78
Two-party-preferred result
Labor	Alan Griffin	39,864	50.76	−0.77
Liberal	Julian Beale	38,669	49.24	+0.77
Labor notional hold		Swing	−0.77	

==== 1993 ====
1993 Australian federal election: Bruce
Party	Candidate	Votes	%	±%
Liberal	Julian Beale	37,607	52.85	+0.87
Labor	Beverley Williams	28,986	40.74	+9.42
Democrats	Leslie Chandra	3,899	5.48	−8.07
Natural Law	Nicolas Di Tempora	665	0.93	+0.93
Total formal votes		71,157	97.39	+0.46
Informal votes		1,909	2.61	−0.46
Turnout		74,066	97.23	
Two-party-preferred result
Liberal	Julian Beale	39,181	55.09	−4.24
Labor	Beverley Williams	31,937	44.91	+4.24
Liberal hold		Swing	−4.24	

==== 1990 ====
1990 Australian federal election: Bruce
Party	Candidate	Votes	%	±%
Liberal	Julian Beale	36,171	52.0	+2.1
Labor	Philip Cottier	21,794	31.3	−9.3
Democrats	Geoff Herbert	9,431	13.6	+5.6
Call to Australia	Peter Olney	2,195	3.2	+3.2
Total formal votes		69,591	96.9	
Informal votes		2,203	3.1	
Turnout		71,794	97.0	
Two-party-preferred result
Liberal	Julian Beale	41,268	59.3	+4.9
Labor	Philip Cottier	28,285	40.7	−4.9
Liberal hold		Swing	+4.9	

=== Elections in the 1980s ===
==== 1987 ====
1987 Australian federal election: Bruce
Party	Candidate	Votes	%	±%
Liberal	Ken Aldred	28,568	47.5	+0.8
Labor	Patrick Robinson	25,866	43.0	−0.6
Democrats	Kare Carr	4,820	8.0	+2.0
Unite Australia	Terence Pooley	910	1.5	+1.5
Total formal votes		60,164	95.0	
Informal votes		3,171	5.0	
Turnout		63,335	96.0	
Two-party-preferred result
Liberal	Ken Aldred	31,282	52.0	−0.1
Labor	Patrick Robinson	28,862	48.0	+0.1
Liberal hold		Swing	−0.1	

==== 1984 ====
1984 Australian federal election: Bruce
Party	Candidate	Votes	%	±%
Liberal	Ken Aldred	27,536	46.7	+2.3
Labor	Joan Graystone	25,723	43.6	−0.6
Democrats	Michael Johnson	3,528	6.0	−1.8
Democratic Labor	Mary Mulholland	2,171	3.7	+3.7
Total formal votes		58,958	93.6	
Informal votes		4,061	6.4	
Turnout		63,019	96.2	
Two-party-preferred result
Liberal	Ken Aldred	30,711	52.1	+1.3
Labor	Joan Graystone	28,230	47.9	−1.3
Liberal hold		Swing	+1.3	

==== 1983 by-election ====
Bruce by-election, 1983
Party	Candidate	Votes	%	±%
Liberal	Ken Aldred	35,849	48.5	+0.6
Labor	Heather O'Connor	31,354	42.4	−1.9
Democrats	Michael Johnson	4,769	6.5	−1.3
Democratic Labor	John Mulholland	1,621	2.2	+2.2
Independent	Wilhelm Kapphan	111	0.2	+0.2
Progress	Peter Fogarty	105	0.1	+0.1
Constitutionalist	Bill Thiele	94	0.1	+0.1
Total formal votes		73,903	98.3	+0.0
Informal votes		1,266	1.7	−0.0
Turnout		75,169	92.0	−5.3
Two-party-preferred result
Liberal	Ken Aldred	40,259	54.5	+3.8
Labor	Heather O'Connor	33,644	45.5	−3.8
Liberal hold		Swing	+3.8	

==== 1983 ====
1983 Australian federal election: Bruce
Party	Candidate	Votes	%	±%
Liberal	Sir Billy Snedden	36,381	47.9	−0.9
Labor	Heather O'Connor	33,650	44.3	+6.0
Democrats	Michael Johnson	5,955	7.8	−3.3
Total formal votes		75,986	98.3	
Informal votes		1,292	1.7	
Turnout		77,278	97.3	
Two-party-preferred result
Liberal	Sir Billy Snedden	38,544	50.7	−4.7
Labor	Heather O'Connor	37,442	49.3	+4.7
Liberal hold		Swing	−4.7	

==== 1980 ====
1980 Australian federal election: Bruce
Party	Candidate	Votes	%	±%
Liberal	Sir Billy Snedden	34,982	48.8	−1.6
Labor	Gayle Whyte	27,457	38.3	+7.2
Democrats	Fraser Hercus	7,942	11.1	−4.1
Democratic Labor	Elaine Mulholland	954	1.3	−2.0
Independent	Wilhelm Kapphan	366	0.5	+0.5
Total formal votes		71,701	97.6	
Informal votes		1,737	2.4	
Turnout		73,438	96.7	
Two-party-preferred result
Liberal	Sir Billy Snedden	39,724	55.4	−5.6
Labor	Gayle Whyte	31,977	44.6	+5.6
Liberal hold		Swing	−5.6	

=== Elections in the 1970s ===
==== 1977 ====
1977 Australian federal election: Bruce
Party	Candidate	Votes	%	±%
Liberal	Billy Snedden	33,913	50.4	−7.3
Labor	Timothy Burke	20,927	31.1	−5.3
Democrats	John Sutcliffe	10,199	15.2	+15.2
Democratic Labor	John Mulholland	2,237	3.3	+0.3
Total formal votes		67,276	97.9	
Informal votes		1,418	2.1	
Turnout		68,694	96.9	
Two-party-preferred result
Liberal	Billy Snedden		61.0	−0.6
Labor	Timothy Burke		39.0	+0.6
Liberal hold		Swing	−0.6	

==== 1975 ====
1975 Australian federal election: Bruce
Party	Candidate	Votes	%	±%
Liberal	Billy Snedden	44,314	57.2	+8.7
Labor	Graeme Bond	28,577	36.9	−6.4
Democratic Labor	John Lloyd	2,347	3.0	−1.5
Australia	Iris Pederick	1,748	2.3	−0.5
Independent	Diana Martin	469	0.6	+0.6
Total formal votes		77,455	98.4	
Informal votes		1,232	1.6	
Turnout		78,687	96.7	
Two-party-preferred result
Liberal	Billy Snedden		61.1	+8.7
Labor	Graeme Bond		38.9	−8.7
Liberal hold		Swing	+8.7	

==== 1974 ====
1974 Australian federal election: Bruce
Party	Candidate	Votes	%	±%
Liberal	Billy Snedden	35,616	48.5	+4.2
Labor	Russell Oakley	31,780	43.3	+1.5
Democratic Labor	Rex Harper	3,270	4.5	−2.9
Australia	Iris Pederick	2,064	2.8	−3.7
Independent	John Ryan	421	0.6	+0.6
Independent	Diana Martin	196	0.3	+0.3
Independent	Glen Mann	129	0.2	+0.2
Total formal votes		73,476	98.4	
Informal votes		1,182	1.6	
Turnout		74,658	96.9	
Two-party-preferred result
Liberal	Billy Snedden	38,486	52.4	+0.2
Labor	Russell Oakley	34,990	47.6	−0.2
Liberal hold		Swing	+0.2	

==== 1972 ====
1972 Australian federal election: Bruce
Party	Candidate	Votes	%	±%
Liberal	Billy Snedden	27,893	44.3	−5.3
Labor	Russell Oakley	26,312	41.8	+5.8
Democratic Labor	Rex Harper	4,632	7.4	−3.0
Australia	Peter Moore	4,170	6.5	+4.6
Total formal votes		62,944	98.5	
Informal votes		987	1.5	
Turnout		63,931	97.1	
Two-party-preferred result
Liberal	Billy Snedden	32,881	52.2	−7.7
Labor	Russell Oakley	30,063	47.8	+7.7
Liberal hold		Swing	−7.7	

=== Elections in the 1960s ===
==== 1969 ====
1969 Australian federal election: Bruce
Party	Candidate	Votes	%	±%
Liberal	Billy Snedden	25,470	49.7	−7.8
Labor	Leon Phillips	18,449	36.0	+11.2
Democratic Labor	William Hoyne	5,308	10.4	−1.6
Australia	Douglas McKay	990	1.9	+1.9
Independent	Herbert Wessley	669	1.3	+1.3
Communist	Les Smith	366	0.7	−0.6
Total formal votes		51,252	96.8	
Informal votes		1,681	3.2	
Turnout		52,933	96.2	
Two-party-preferred result
Liberal	Billy Snedden		59.9	−7.7
Labor	Leon Phillips		40.1	+7.7
Liberal hold		Swing	−7.7	

==== 1966 ====
1966 Australian federal election: Bruce
Party	Candidate	Votes	%	±%
Liberal	Billy Snedden	58,268	52.9	+4.5
Labor	Leslie Donnelly	32,410	29.4	−11.4
Democratic Labor	Henri de Sachau	13,242	12.0	+2.6
Liberal Reform Group	Herbert Wessley	4,188	3.8	+3.8
Communist	Ralph Gibson	1,467	1.3	+1.3
Independent	John Saunderson	526	0.5	+0.5
Total formal votes		110,101	96.1	
Informal votes		4,411	3.9	
Turnout		114,512	95.9	
Two-party-preferred result
Liberal	Billy Snedden		63.0	+5.6
Labor	Leslie Donnelly		37.0	−5.6
Liberal hold		Swing	+5.6	

==== 1963 ====
1963 Australian federal election: Bruce
Party	Candidate	Votes	%	±%
Liberal	Billy Snedden	45,542	48.4	+6.8
Labor	Barry Jones	38,396	40.8	−1.9
Democratic Labor	Henry de Sachau	8,857	9.4	−6.3
Independent	Brian Crossley	920	1.0	+1.0
Independent	Tom Gilhooley	474	0.5	+0.5
Total formal votes		94,189	98.2	
Informal votes		1,682	1.8	
Turnout		95,871	96.8	
Two-party-preferred result
Liberal	Billy Snedden	54,026	57.4	+5.2
Labor	Barry Jones	40,163	42.6	−5.2
Liberal hold		Swing	+5.2	

==== 1961 ====
1961 Australian federal election: Bruce
Party	Candidate	Votes	%	±%
Labor	Keith Ewert	34,741	42.7	+2.4
Liberal	Billy Snedden	33,882	41.6	−4.5
Democratic Labor	Henri de Sachau	12,826	15.7	+2.1
Total formal votes		81,449	98.0	
Informal votes		1,671	2.0	
Turnout		83,120	95.3	
Two-party-preferred result
Liberal	Billy Snedden	42,543	52.2	−2.3
Labor	Keith Ewert	38,906	47.8	+2.3
Liberal hold		Swing	−2.3	

=== Elections in the 1950s ===
==== 1958 ====
1958 Australian federal election: Bruce
Party	Candidate	Votes	%	±%
Liberal	Billy Snedden	28,251	46.1	−1.6
Labor	Keith Ewert	24,681	40.3	−1.1
Democratic Labor	Henri de Sachau	8,326	13.6	+2.6
Total formal votes		61,258	97.6	
Informal votes		1,475	2.4	
Turnout		62,733	96.4	
Two-party-preferred result
Liberal	Billy Snedden	33,398	54.5	−1.2
Labor	Keith Ewert	27,860	45.5	+1.2
Liberal hold		Swing	−1.2	

==== 1955 ====
1955 Australian federal election: Bruce
Party	Candidate	Votes	%	±%
Liberal	Billy Snedden	21,127	47.7	−4.4
Labor	Keith Ewert	18,335	41.4	−5.0
Labor (A-C)	Reginald Kearney	4,873	11.0	+11.0
Total formal votes		44,335	97.3	
Informal votes		1,227	2.7	
Turnout		45,562	94.2	
Two-party-preferred result
Liberal	Billy Snedden	24,705	55.7	+3.5
Labor	Keith Ewert	19,630	44.3	−3.5
Liberal notional hold		Swing	+3.5	
