= Electoral results for the Division of Corinella =

Electoral results for the Division of Corinella may refer to:

- Electoral results for the Division of Corinella (1901–06)
- Electoral results for the Division of Corinella (1990–96)
