= Electoral results for the Division of Corinella (1990–1996) =

Australian division election results

This is a list of electoral results for the Division of Corinella (1990–96) in Australian federal elections from the division's creation in 1990 until its abolition in 1996.

== Members ==
Member	Party	Term
Russell Broadbent	Liberal	1990–1993
Alan Griffin	Labor	1993–1996

== Election results ==
=== Elections in the 1990s ===
==== 1993 ====
1993 Australian federal election: Corinella
Party	Candidate	Votes	%	±%
Labor	Alan Griffin	39,194	50.05	+11.72
Liberal	Russell Broadbent	33,139	42.32	−2.03
Democrats	Taylor Holst	2,224	2.84	−9.09
Natural Law	Gary Nelson	1,494	1.91	+1.91
Independent	Trudie Oldis	1,482	1.89	+1.89
	Predrag Pjanic	782	1.00	+1.00
Total formal votes		78,315	96.94	+0.47
Informal votes		2,470	3.06	−0.47
Turnout		80,785	96.78	
Two-party-preferred result
Labor	Alan Griffin	42,043	53.74	+4.47
Liberal	Russell Broadbent	36,193	46.26	−4.47
Labor gain from Liberal		Swing	+4.47	

==== 1990 ====
1990 Australian federal election: Corinella
Party	Candidate	Votes	%	±%
Liberal	Russell Broadbent	28,991	44.3	+3.1
Labor	Lewis Kent	25,057	38.3	−12.6
Democrats	Mike Burns	7,802	11.9	+5.7
Citizens Electoral Council	George Moran	3,524	5.4	+5.4
Total formal votes		65,374	96.5	
Informal votes		2,391	3.5	
Turnout		67,765	95.9	
Two-party-preferred result
Liberal	Russell Broadbent	33,134	50.7	+6.0
Labor	Lewis Kent	32,181	49.3	−6.0
Liberal notional gain from Labor		Swing	+6.0	
