= Electoral results for the Division of Monash =

Australian division election results

This is a list of electoral results for the Division of Monash in Australian federal elections from the division's creation in 2019 until the present.

== Members ==
| Member | Party | Term |
|---|---|---|
| Russell Broadbent | Liberal | 2019–2025 |
| Mary Aldred | Liberal | 2025–present |

== Election results ==
=== Elections in the 2020s ===
==== 2025 ====
2025 Australian federal election: Monash
| Party | Candidate | Votes | % | ±% |
|---|---|---|---|---|
| Liberal | Mary Aldred | 31,237 | 32.08 | −5.71 |
| Labor | Tully Fletcher | 19,717 | 20.25 | −5.35 |
| Independent | Deb Leonard | 16,780 | 17.23 | +6.51 |
| Independent | Russell Broadbent | 10,013 | 10.28 | +10.28 |
| One Nation | Kuljeet Kaur Robinson | 7,699 | 7.91 | +0.37 |
| Greens | Terence Steele | 4,509 | 4.63 | −5.23 |
| Legalise Cannabis | David O'Reilly | 3,296 | 3.38 | +3.38 |
| Trumpet of Patriots | Alex Wehbe | 2,434 | 2.50 | +1.80 |
| Family First | Geoff Dethlefs | 1,696 | 1.74 | +1.74 |
| Total formal votes | | 97,381 | 94.20 | −1.12 |
| Informal votes | | 5,995 | 5.80 | +1.12 |
| Turnout | | 103,376 | 88.71 | −0.10 |
Two-party-preferred result
| Liberal | Mary Aldred | 52,889 | 54.31 | +1.41 |
| Labor | Tully Fletcher | 44,492 | 45.69 | −1.41 |
| Liberal hold | | Swing | +1.41 | |

Results are not final. Last updated on 12 May 2025 at 10:30 PM AEST.

==== 2022 ====
2022 Australian federal election: Monash
| Party | Candidate | Votes | % | ±% |
|---|---|---|---|---|
| Liberal | Russell Broadbent | 36,546 | 37.79 | −8.19 |
| Labor | Jessica O'Donnell | 24,759 | 25.60 | −4.30 |
| Independent | Deb Leonard | 10,372 | 10.72 | +10.72 |
| Greens | Mat Morgan | 9,533 | 9.86 | +2.69 |
| One Nation | Allan Hicken | 7,289 | 7.54 | +0.22 |
| United Australia | Christine McShane | 3,991 | 4.13 | +0.18 |
| Liberal Democrats | Meg Edwards | 3,548 | 3.67 | +3.67 |
| Federation | David Welsh | 674 | 0.70 | +0.70 |
| Total formal votes | | 96,712 | 95.32 | −0.33 |
| Informal votes | | 4,752 | 4.68 | +0.33 |
| Turnout | | 101,464 | 91.34 | −1.20 |
Two-party-preferred result
| Liberal | Russell Broadbent | 51,156 | 52.90 | −3.96 |
| Labor | Jessica O'Donnell | 45,556 | 47.10 | +3.96 |
| Liberal hold | | Swing | −3.96 | |

Alluvial diagram for preference flows in the seat of Monash in the 2022 federal election. indicates at what stage the winning candidate had over 50% of the votes and was declared the winner.

=== Elections in the 2010s ===
==== 2019 ====
2019 Australian federal election: Monash
| Party | Candidate | Votes | % | ±% |
|---|---|---|---|---|
| Liberal | Russell Broadbent | 46,501 | 46.28 | −3.58 |
| Labor | Jessica O'Donnell | 29,656 | 29.51 | +1.75 |
| One Nation | Jeff Waddell | 7,656 | 7.62 | +7.62 |
| Greens | William Hornstra | 7,047 | 7.01 | −3.09 |
| United Australia | Matthew Sherry | 4,028 | 4.01 | +4.01 |
| Independent | Michael Fozard | 2,870 | 2.86 | +2.86 |
| Independent | John Verhoeven | 2,723 | 2.71 | +2.71 |
| Total formal votes | | 100,481 | 95.59 | +0.88 |
| Informal votes | | 4,636 | 4.41 | −0.88 |
| Turnout | | 105,117 | 93.45 | +2.08 |
Two-party-preferred result
| Liberal | Russell Broadbent | 57,631 | 57.36 | −0.15 |
| Labor | Jessica O'Donnell | 42,850 | 42.64 | +0.15 |
| Liberal notional hold | | Swing | −0.15 | |

Monash was a new seat notionally held by the Liberal Party.
