= 1983 Bruce by-election =

Australian federal by-election

28 May 1983
	First party	Second party
Candidate	Ken Aldred	Heather O'Connor
Party	Liberal	Labor
Popular vote	35,849	31,354
Percentage	48.5%	42.4%
Swing	▲0.6pp	▼1.9pp
TPP	54.5%	45.5%
TPP swing	▲3.8pp	▼3.8pp
MP before election
Billy Snedden
Liberal
Elected MP
Ken Aldred
Liberal

A by-election was held for the Australian House of Representatives seat of Bruce on 28 May 1983. This was triggered by the resignation of Liberal Party MP and former Opposition Leader Sir Billy Snedden.

== Results ==
Bruce by-election, 1983
Party	Candidate	Votes	%	±%
Liberal	Ken Aldred	35,849	48.5	+0.6
Labor	Heather O'Connor	31,354	42.4	−1.9
Democrats	Michael Johnson	4,769	6.5	−1.3
Democratic Labor	John Mulholland	1,621	2.2	+2.2
Independent	Wilhelm Kapphan	111	0.2	+0.2
Progress	Peter Fogarty	105	0.1	+0.1
Constitutionalist	Bill Thiele	94	0.1	+0.1
Total formal votes		73,903	98.3	+0.0
Informal votes		1,266	1.7	−0.0
Turnout		75,169	92.0	−5.3
Two-party-preferred result
Liberal	Ken Aldred	40,259	54.5	+3.8
Labor	Heather O'Connor	33,644	45.5	−3.8
Liberal hold		Swing	+3.8	

== See also ==
- List of Australian federal by-elections
