= Arthur Hewson =

Australian politician (1914–1999)

Arthur Hewson OAM
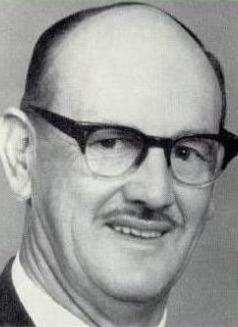

Member of the Australian Parliament for McMillan
- In office 2 December 1972 – 13 December 1975
- Preceded by: Alex Buchanan
- Succeeded by: Barry Simon

Personal details
- Born: 31 December 1914 Korumburra, Victoria
- Died: 20 November 1999 (aged 84)
- Party: Country Party
- Occupation: Dairy farmer

Henry Arthur Hewson, OAM (31 December 1914 – 20 November 1999) was an Australian politician. Born in Korumburra, Victoria, he was a dairy farmer at Warragul before serving in the military 1941–45. He was active in local politics as a member of Warragul Shire Council, and was elected to Gippsland Province in the Victorian Legislative Council for a six-year term at the 1964 state election.

In 1972, he was elected to the Australian House of Representatives as the Country Party member for McMillan, despite receiving only 16.6% of the primary vote. It was one of the lowest primary votes achieved by a successful candidate in a single member electorate in an Australian election. His election was made possible by a strong flow of preferences from the Democratic Labor Party and from former Liberal member Alex Buchanan, who was running as an independent after losing his Liberal endorsement to Barrie Armitage. On polling day, Hewson picked up enough preferences from the DLP and Buchanan to overtake Armitage on the third count. He then won the seat on the fourth count after Armitage's preferences flowed overwhelmingly to him.

Despite the Coalition agreement at federal level, relations between the main non-Labor parties in Victoria were somewhat frosty at the time. The Victorian Liberal Party Executive created an unusual three-way campaign in 1974 by fielding Armitage against Hewson. A minor controversy ensued when Hewson issued an allegedly confusing How-to-Vote Card (using Liberal colours rather than Country Party colours, and headed "Liberal-Country Party Senate Team").

Hewson was in turn defeated by Liberal candidate, Barry Simon, in 1975. Hewson died in 1999.

Parliament of Australia
Preceded by Alex Buchanan	Member for McMillan; 1972–1975	Succeeded by Barry Simon
