= John Riggall =

Australian politician

Member of the Australian Parliament for McMillan
- In office 24 March 1990 – 13 March 1993
- Preceded by: Barry Cunningham
- Succeeded by: Barry Cunningham

Personal details
- Born: 10 May 1941 (age 85) Melbourne, Victoria, Australia
- Party: Liberal
- Occupation: Farmer

John Peter Riggall (born 10 May 1941) is a former Australian politician. He served in the House of Representatives from 1990 to 1993, representing the Victorian seat of McMillan for the Liberal Party.

== Early life ==
Riggall was born on 10 May 1941 in Melbourne, the son of Horton and Edna Riggall. Prior to entering politics he worked as a dairy farmer and grazier. He holds a diploma in rural studies from the McMillan Rural Studies Centre.

== Politics ==
Before his election to parliament, Riggall served on the state council of the Liberal Party of Australia (Victorian Division) and was an officeholder in his local branch. He was elected to parliament at the 1990 federal election, defeating the incumbent Australian Labor Party (ALP) member Barry Cunningham in the Division of McMillan. In parliament Riggall served on the House Standing Committees on Aboriginal Affairs and Employment, Education and Training. Cunningham reclaimed McMillan for the Labor Party at the 1993 election.

== Personal life ==
Riggall had three children with his wife June.

Parliament of Australia
Preceded by Barry Cunningham	Member for McMillan; 1990–1993	Succeeded by Barry Cunningham
