= Division of Bruce =

Australian federal electoral division

Coordinates: 37.931°S 145.186°E

Bruce Australian House of Representatives Division
- Interactive map of electorate boundaries from the 2025 federal election
- Created: 1955
- MP: Julian Hill
- Party: Labor
- Namesake: Stanley Bruce
- Electors: 127,671 (2025)
- Area: 142 km^{2} (54.8 sq mi)
- Demographic: Outer metropolitan

The Division of Bruce is an Australian Electoral Division in the state of Victoria. The division is located in the south-eastern suburbs of Melbourne. It covers an area of approximately 115 square kilometres (44 sq mi) including the suburbs of Dandenong North, Doveton, Endeavour Hills, Eumemmerring, Hallam, Harkaway, Lysterfield South, Narre Warren, and Narre Warren North; and parts of Beaconsfield, Berwick, Cranbourne North, Dandenong, Mulgrave, Narre Warren South, and Noble Park North.

Bruce is an ethnically diverse and multicultural electorate, with a large Sri Lankan community and the highest number of Sinhalese speakers in the country.

== Geography ==
Since 1984, federal electoral division boundaries in Australia have been determined at redistributions by a redistribution committee appointed by the Australian Electoral Commission. Redistributions occur for the boundaries of divisions in a particular state, and they occur every seven years, or sooner if a state's representation entitlement changes or when divisions of a state are malapportioned.

== History ==
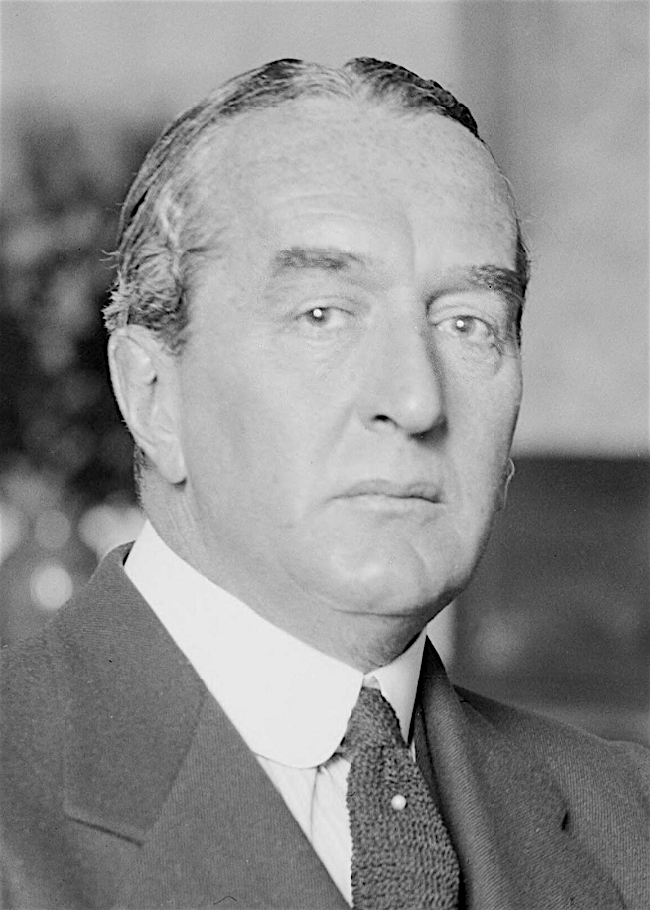
Stanley Bruce, the division's namesake

The division was created in 1955, and is named for Stanley Bruce, who was Prime Minister of Australia from 1923 to 1929. Unusually, the division was named after a living person, as Bruce did not die until 1967.

Originally, the division was based on Glen Waverley and Mount Waverley, and was a fairly safe seat for the Liberal Party, but it became increasingly marginal in the 1980s. A redistribution in 1996 pushed its boundaries southward, erasing the Liberal majority altogether and making it notionally a Labor seat. Labor took the seat at that year's election even as it was heavily defeated federally, and since then it has been a marginal Labor seat.

Its most prominent member was Sir Billy Snedden, Liberal Party leader from 1972 to 1975 and Speaker of the Australian House of Representatives from 1976 to 1983. At the 2011 Census, the division had the nation's highest proportion of residents born overseas (50.8%), and the third highest proportion born in a non-English speaking country (45.4%). It also has the sixth highest proportion speaking a language other than English at home (51.6%), the highest for any Victorian electorate.

The current Member for Bruce, since the 2016 federal election, is Julian Hill, who is a member of the Australian Labor Party.

== Demographics ==
Bruce is a diverse and socially conservative electorate and is historically working-class. Bruce has three times the proportion of families with Chinese backgrounds as the state average. While a stronghold for the center-left Labor Party, religious migrant communities in the electorate rallied strongly against the Australian Marriage Law Postal Survey in 2017, since the survey process was not trusted by both Islamic and Chinese Christian migrant communities, who believe it had been hijacked by out-of-touch inner-city leaders.

== Members ==
Image	Member	Party	Term	Notes
	Sir Billy Snedden (1926–1987)	Liberal	10 December 1955 – 21 April 1983	Served as minister under Menzies, Holt, McEwen, Gorton and McMahon. Served as Opposition Leader from 1972 to 1975. Served as Speaker during the Fraser Government. Resigned to retire from politics
	Ken Aldred (1945–2016)	Liberal	28 May 1983 – 24 March 1990	Previously held the Division of Henty. Lost preselection. Transferred to the Division of Deakin
	Julian Beale (1934–2021)	Liberal	24 March 1990 – 2 March 1996	Previously held the Division of Deakin. Lost seat
	Alan Griffin (1960–)	Labor	2 March 1996 – 9 May 2016	Previously held the Division of Corinella. Served as minister under Rudd and Gillard. Retired
	Julian Hill (1973–)	Labor	2 July 2016 – present	Incumbent

== Election results ==
2025 Australian federal election: Bruce
Party	Candidate	Votes	%	±%
Labor	Julian Hill	49,610	45.31	+5.05
Liberal	Zahid Safi	25,162	22.98	−8.70
Greens	Rhonda Garad	13,213	12.07	+2.36
One Nation	Bianca Colecchia	8,931	8.16	+3.47
Family First	Wendy Birchall	4,196	3.83	+3.83
Legalise Cannabis	Andrew Louth	3,563	3.25	+3.25
Trumpet of Patriots	Samuel Anderson	3,530	3.22	+3.13
Libertarian	Christine Skrobo	1,289	1.18	−3.55
Total formal votes		109,494	93.86	−1.75
Informal votes		7,165	6.14	+1.75
Turnout		116,659	91.41	+3.69
Two-party-preferred result
Labor	Julian Hill	70,751	64.62	+9.31
Liberal	Zahid Safi	38,743	35.38	−9.31
Labor hold		Swing	+9.31	
