= Ken Aldred =

Australian politician (1945–2016)

Member of the Australian Parliament for Henty
- In office 13 December 1975 – 18 October 1980
- Preceded by: Joan Child
- Succeeded by: Joan Child

Member of the Australian Parliament for Bruce
- In office 28 May 1983 – 24 March 1990
- Preceded by: Billy Snedden
- Succeeded by: Julian Beale

Member of the Australian Parliament for Deakin
- In office 24 March 1990 – 29 January 1996
- Preceded by: Julian Beale
- Succeeded by: Phil Barresi

Personal details
- Born: Kenneth James Aldred; 1 August 1945 East Melbourne, Victoria, Australia
- Died: 17 April 2016 (aged 70)
- Party: Liberal Party of Australia
- Children: Mary Aldred

Kenneth James Aldred (1 August 1945 – 17 April 2016) was an Australian politician who represented the Liberal Party in the Australian House of Representatives between 1975 and 1980 and again from 1983 to 1996.

== Early life ==
Aldred was born in East Melbourne, Victoria, on 1 August 1945. He was educated at Melbourne High School and Monash University, and held the degrees of Bachelor of Economics and Master of Administration from Monash University.

During 1970–71 he was Special Projects Officer in the Commonwealth Public Service Board in Melbourne. This was followed by two years in the period 1971–73, as Management Training Officer at the Administrative College of Papua New Guinea. Though principally based in Port Moresby, Aldred also had responsibility for running management courses in several of PNG's major regional centres.

In June 1973 Aldred returned to the Commonwealth Public Service Board in Melbourne as Industrial Information Officer. Later that year he was appointed Senior Industry Survey Officer in the Commonwealth Industries Assistance Commission, also in Melbourne. He remained there until elected to Federal Parliament in December 1975 as the Member for Henty.

== Military service ==
From 1965 to 1971, Aldred served in the Australian Army Reserve. His first four years were in the Melbourne University Regiment (MUR) and the last two years as a lieutenant and platoon commander in the newly formed Monash University Regiment (Mon UR). He was also Assistant Adjutant of Mon UR, and founded and edited the joint regimental publication, The Military Review. Aldred had a three-month attachment to the Australian Regular Army over the summer of 1968–69, as a sergeant instructor in 1 Recruit Training Battalion (1RTB) at Kapooka in New South Wales.

== Political career ==
=== Federal election ===
Upon election as federal member for Henty in the Australian House of Representatives in the Liberal landslide of 13 December 1975, Aldred assumed a very active role in Coalition and Parliamentary Committees. He chaired the Government Members' Small Business Committee, working closely with the Industry Minister, Phillip Lynch, on small business policy formulation.

As Chairman of the Government Members' Worker Participation Committee, Aldred produced the first definitive set of proposals for a Coalition worker participation policy, to then prime minister, Malcolm Fraser. Many of the proposals were incorporated in a worker participation policy later announced by the productivity minister, Ian Macphee.

=== Expenditure Committee ===
Aldred was an active member of the newly established Expenditure Committee of the House of Representatives and as Chairman of the Government Members' Trade Sub-Committee, worked closely with the Deputy Prime Minister and Trade Minister, Doug Anthony.

=== Manpower Development Executive ===
Defeated in October 1980, by the later House Speaker, Joan Child, Ken Aldred returned to the training profession. In early 1981 he took up the position of Manpower Development Executive with the Victorian Dairy Processing Industry Training Committee (VDPITC), operating under the auspices of the Australian Dairy Cooperation (ADC). In this capacity he spent over two years setting up training courses and training manuals for Victoria's dairy industry factories. He spent a considerable amount of time visiting factories in the state's three dairying regions, namely Gippsland, the Western District and the Northern Region.

Ken Aldred left VDPITC on re-election to the federal parliament in May 1983. He re-entered the House of Representatives through the by-election in Bruce, which followed the resignation of House Speaker, Sir Billy Snedden, after the Coalition defeat in the 1983 federal election.

=== House of Representatives ===
During his time as the MHR for Bruce, Aldred took a prominent role on defence and economic issues, as chair of the Opposition Defence Committee and the Opposition Treasury Committee.

In 1985, he was elected by the Liberal Party to represent Australia at the United Nations General Assembly in New York, as the Opposition Parliamentary Adviser to the Australian Mission. At the UN, he became involved in committee work on the international drug trade and on Antarctica.

Shortly afterwards in 1986–87 he was appointed Parliamentary Secretary to the then Leader of the Opposition, John Howard. Following an electoral re-distribution he was elected to represent Deakin in the 1990 federal election and remained there until the 1996 election, when he lost pre-selection to his successor, Phil Barresi.

Throughout his six years as member for Deakin, Aldred was a most active Liberal member on the Joint Parliamentary Committee of Public Accounts, spearheading the inquiries into business migration and the Australian Taxation Office. The Charter of Taxpayers' Rights and other reforms to Tax Office administration were largely attributed to him.

As a result of these inquiries, abuses of the Business Migration Programme were eliminated and significant reforms were made to Tax Office administration, including the introduction of the Charter of Taxpayers' Rights.

At this time he was also Chairman of the Opposition Immigration and Ethnic Affairs Committee. During the 1980s, Aldred successfully advocated for the immigration to Australia of a large group of Jewish refuseniks from the Soviet Union, when they had been refused admission by the federal Labor government.

=== Controversy ===
In November 1989, Aldred and Senator Jim Short alleged that Labor MP Lewis Kent was "an agent of a foreign power" and had ties to the UDBA, the Yugoslav secret police. Their allegations were based on a statutory declaration from a member of Melbourne's Yugoslav community. Kent vigorously denied their claims, describing them as a smear campaign. The House of Representatives later voted on party lines to suspend Aldred for two days, following a report from the privileges committee.

Aldred was disendorsed by the Liberal Party for Deakin in 1995 for the 1996 federal election and subsequently used parliamentary privilege to make allegations of involvement in espionage and drug trafficking against a prominent Jewish lawyer and a senior foreign affairs official, using documents that were later found to be forged, which had been supplied to him by LaRouche movement front organisation the Citizens Electoral Council.

== Publications ==
Aldred was a regular writer on policy issues for magazines and newspapers. Additionally he was co-editor and contributor to three books.

The first, The Heart of Liberalism, was produced in 1994 with fellow Liberal MPs Kevin Andrews and Paul Filing. It presented a pragmatic and centrist philosophy and set of policies for the Liberal Party.

== After politics ==
After leaving federal parliament in 1996, Aldred was President and later Chairman of the Society of Australian Industry and Employment (SAIE) 2001–08, during which he devoted much time and energy to promoting the interests of Australian industry. This included editing and contributing to two books on industry policy, Rekindling the Flame in 2000, and Getting on Track in 2004.

From December 1996 until his death, Aldred was the proprietor of one of Australia's major equestrian centres, the Victorian Equestrian Centre (VEC) in Upper Beaconsfield. The VEC offers children's riding clubs, school holiday camps, riding lessons, trail rides, specialised training programs and agistment. The VEC also founded the concept of Interschool Equestrian Challenges, with four of them being run each year.

Aldred died unexpectedly on 17 April 2016 and is survived by his four children.

One of these four children, Mary Aldred, was preselected in 2023 as the Liberal candidate for the seat of Monash for the 2025 federal election, and was subsequently elected. The preselection saw Mary Aldred defeat sitting MP Russell Broadbent who was a parliamentary colleague of her late father.

Parliament of Australia
Preceded by Joan Child	Member for Henty; 1975–1980	Succeeded by Joan Child
Preceded by Billy Snedden	Member for Bruce; 1983–1990	Succeeded by Julian Beale
Preceded by Julian Beale	Member for Deakin; 1990–1996	Succeeded by Phil Barresi
