= Julian Beale =

Australian politician (1934–2021)

Member of the Australian Parliament for Deakin
- In office 1 December 1984 – 24 March 1990
- Preceded by: John Saunderson
- Succeeded by: Ken Aldred

Member of the Australian Parliament for Bruce
- In office 24 March 1990 – 2 March 1996
- Preceded by: Ken Aldred
- Succeeded by: Alan Griffin

Personal details
- Born: 10 October 1934 Sydney
- Died: 3 August 2021 (aged 86)
- Party: Liberal Party of Australia
- Relations: Howard Beale (father)

Julian Howard Beale (10 October 1934 – 3 August 2021) was an Australian businessman and federal politician. He was the son of former cabinet minister and ambassador Sir Howard Beale.

Julian Beale was a Liberal member of the Australian Parliament for four consecutive terms, representing the seat of Deakin in Victoria from 1984 to 1990 and Bruce from 1990 to 1996.

Beale served the four terms while in opposition. He served as a shadow minister under John Howard, Andrew Peacock and John Hewson from 1985 to 1993, after which he returned to the backbench before being defeated at the 1996 election following a redistribution of his seat. He later became the chairman of Adacel Technologies, a communications company, since 2003; and was a director of Visy Industries.

He was the father of Debbie Beale, the former wife of Bill Shorten, who was Australian Leader of the Opposition and was later appointed Minister for the National Disability Insurance Scheme and Government Services in the Albanese ministry. Beale died on 3 August 2021, aged 86.

== Notes ==
Parliament of Australia
Preceded by John Saunderson	Member for Deakin; 1984–1990	Succeeded by Ken Aldred
Preceded by Ken Aldred	Member for Bruce; 1990–1996	Succeeded by Alan Griffin
