= Geoffrey Brown (Australian politician) =

Australian politician (1894–1955)

Geoffrey Brown MBE
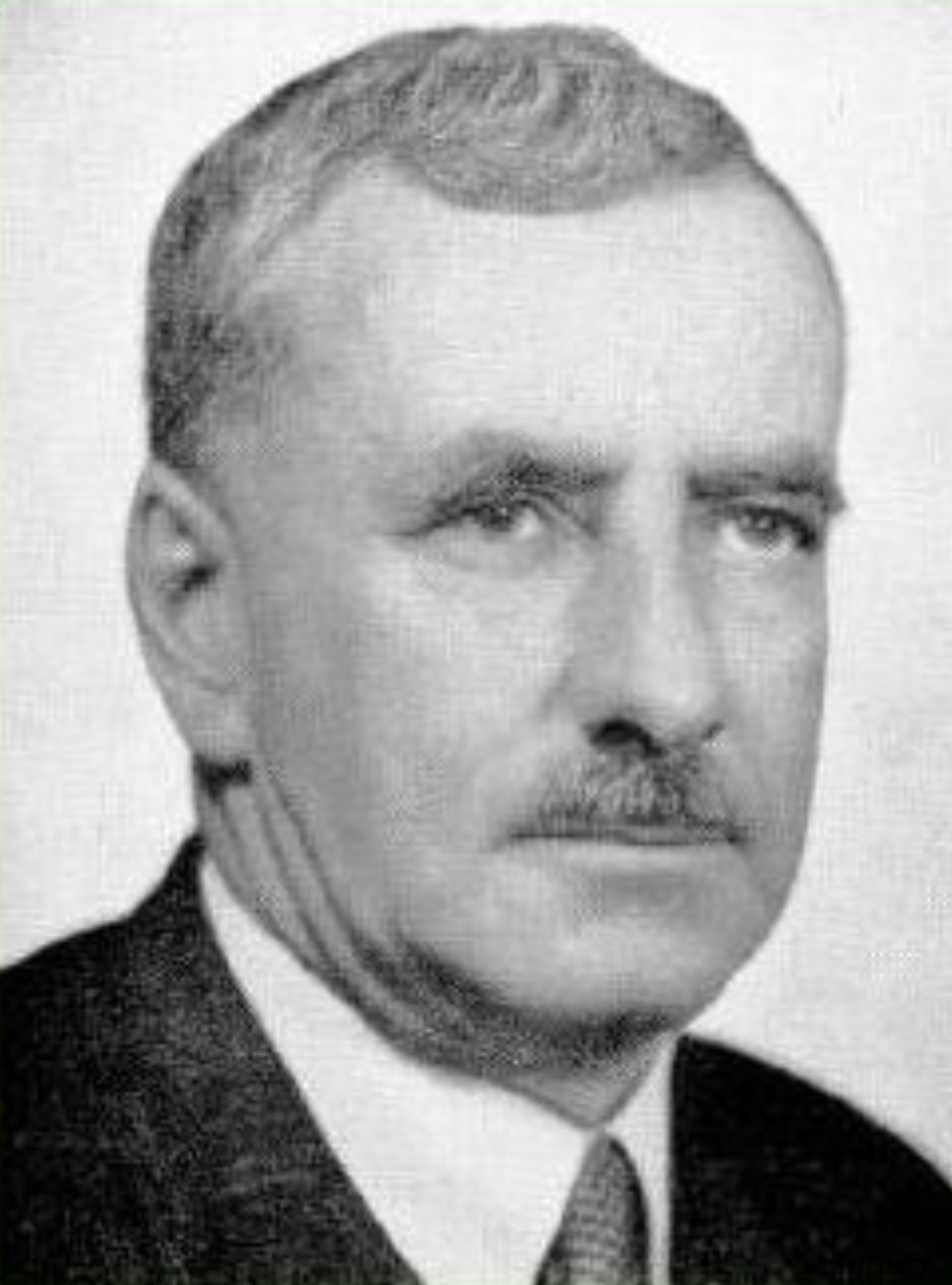

Member of the Australian Parliament for McMillan
- In office 10 December 1949 – 14 October 1955
- Preceded by: New seat
- Succeeded by: Alex Buchanan

Personal details
- Born: 25 April 1894 Colac, Victoria
- Died: 14 October 1955 (aged 61) Parkville, Victoria, Australia
- Party: Liberal Party of Australia
- Education: Cambridge University
- Occupation: Orchardist

Geoffrey William Brown MBE (25 April 1894 – 14 October 1955) was an Australian politician.

The son of Dr. Henry William Brown and Clara Treacher Brown (née Williams), he was born in Colac, Victoria, on 25 April 1894. He attended Geelong Grammar School from 1908 to 1911 and then Christ College at Cambridge University in England where he graduated with a degree in natural sciences.

He served in the British Expeditionary Force for five years from 1914 to 1919, being severely wounded and appointed M.B.E. and was then with the British Colonial Service for four years in England and Nigeria.

Brown is believed to have served with the Royal West Kent Regiment in France and Belgium, being wounded at the Battle of Loos

Appointed MBE on 7 June 1918, he was then posted as a lieutenant in the role of administrative officer and assistant adjutant at a School of Instruction. He is believed to have ended the war as a captain.

On 7 April 1921, he married Caroline Mabel Brawn, youngest daughter of G Brawn JP at Lichfield Cathedral. Their daughter, Joan T was born at Atcham in Shropshire in 1922.

In 1924, he returned to Australia to become an orchardist in Merricks and living at "Moelfre".

He was president of the Victorian Fruit Marketing Association (1931–38), Victorian growers' delegate to the Australian Apple and Pear Council (1931–38), member of the Commonwealth delegation to the Imperial Fruit Marketing Committees meeting in London (chairman in 1934, vice-chairman 1936), and a member of the committee which prepared the Australian case for the Ottawa Conference in 1931. In 1949, Brown was president of the Victorian Fruitgrowers Council and vice president of the Australian Fruitgrowers Association.

With the electoral redistribution of 1949 splitting the seat of Gippsland, a new seat of McMillan was created, taking a portion from the neighboring Flinders. Brown was encouraged to stand, although living well outside the seat's boundaries. His campaign manager and successor, Alexander Andrew Buchanan reminisced that Brown would initially turn up for political meetings in "old bags (trousers) and gumboots"

In 1949, he was elected to the Australian House of Representatives as the Liberal member for the new seat of McMillan. During his time in parliament, he chaired the Immigration Advisory Council and also of the Government Members' Food and Agricultural Committee. He held the seat until his death at Royal Melbourne Hospital, Parkville in 1955, following a heart attack, whilst sitting in the House of Representatives.

He was survived by his wife, Mrs. E Brown, a son, also Geoffrey and a daughter, Joan (Mrs William N.R Brisbane).

Parliament of Australia
New division	Member for McMillan; 1949–1955	Succeeded by Alex Buchanan
