= Barry Cunningham (politician) =

Australian politician (1939–2018)

Member of the Australian Parliament for McMillan
- In office 18 October 1980 – 24 March 1990
- Preceded by: Barry Simon
- Succeeded by: John Riggall
- In office 13 March 1993 – 2 March 1996
- Preceded by: John Riggall
- Succeeded by: Russell Broadbent

Personal details
- Born: 26 October 1939 Pakenham, Victoria, Australia
- Died: 12 September 2018 (aged 78) Warragul, Victoria, Australia
- Party: Australian Labor Party
- Occupation: Farmer

Barry Thomas Cunningham (26 October 1939 – 12 September 2018) was an Australian politician. Born in Pakenham, Victoria, he was a dairy and potato farmer and an agricultural contractor before entering politics. In 1980, he was elected to the Australian House of Representatives as the Labor member for McMillan, defeating Barry Simon of the Liberal Party, who had been deprived of Democratic Labor Party preferences due to his views on abortion. He was defeated in 1990 but was re-elected in 1993, before being defeated again in 1996.

In 2015, Cunningham and three other former MPs brought a case before the High Court of Australia, purporting that reductions to their retirement allowances and limitations on the number of "domestic return trips per year" under the Members of Parliament (Life Gold Pass) Act 2002 was unconstitutional under S51(xxxi) of the Constitution of Australia. They lost the case in 2016, with the court finding that Parliament was entitled to vary the terms of allowances. He died in 2018.

Parliament of Australia
| Preceded by Barry Simon | Member for McMillan; 1980–1990 | Succeeded by John Riggall |
| Preceded by John Riggall | Member for McMillan; 1993–1996 | Succeeded by Russell Broadbent |
