= Division of McMillan =

Former Australian federal electoral division

Coordinates: 38.266°S 146.059°E

McMillan Australian House of Representatives Division
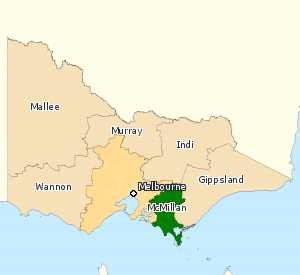
- Division of McMillan in Victoria, as of the 2016 federal election
- Created: 1949
- Abolished: 2019
- Namesake: Angus McMillan
- Electors: 116,200 (2016)
- Area: 8,328 km^{2} (3,215.5 sq mi)
- Demographic: Rural

The Division of McMillan was an Australian Electoral Division in the state of Victoria. It was located in the West Gippsland and South Gippsland regions, and extended for the length of Victoria's eastern Bass Strait coastline. It was the southernmost electoral division in continental Australia. It was replaced by the Division of Monash in 2019.

== Geography ==
When the division was created in 1949, it covered a vast area of West Gippsland, South Gippsland and the eastern side of the Dandenong Ranges, which were previously in the Division of Flinders, and to a smaller extent, the Division of Gippsland. In 1977, it gained Phillip Island from the Division of Flinders, as well as areas in the Yarra Valley such as Warburton, Yarra Junction from the Division of La Trobe.

In 1984, the division lost areas in the Yarra Valley and the Dandenong Ranges such as Warburton, Yarra Junction, Victoria and Gembrook to the new Division of Streeton. In the same redistribution, it also lost the South Gippsland areas and Phillip Island back to the Division of Flinders. In 2003, the division lost Morwell and Traralgon to the Division of Gippsland, but also gained areas from the latter by expanding southwards to include areas in South Gippsland again. However, these areas were mainly in the South Gippsland Shire rather than the areas in the Bass Coast Shire which it covered prior to 1984. As a result, most of these gained areas were actually never in the division previously, with the exception of Wonthaggi, Nyora and Poowong.

In 2010, the division had a minor boundary change and gained a block of Pakenham. In 2018, when the division was abolished, majority were replaced by the new Division of Monash, with the exception of Pakenham which went to the Division of La Trobe and the town of Yallourn North which went to the Division of Gippsland.

At the time of abolition in 2018, it included the outer south-eastern Melbourne suburb of Pakenham, and also included the towns of Warragul, Moe, Wonthaggi, Leongatha and Foster. It stretched from Mount Baw Baw and the Baw Baw National Park in the north to Wilsons Promontory, and the Wilsons Promontory National Park in the south.

== History ==
Angus McMillan, the division's namesake

The Division was proclaimed at the redistribution of 11 May 1949, and was first contested at the 1949 election. It was named after Angus McMillan, an early European explorer in the Gippsland region, and later considered a mass murderer, responsible for the Gippsland massacres. The seat traded hands between the conservative parties from its creation until Labor finally won it in 1980. The Division has changed hands five times in the last seven Federal elections. The change at the 2004 election was attributed to the redistribution of 29 January 2003, which removed the traditionally Labor-voting cities of Traralgon and Morwell from the Division. This allowed Liberal Russell Broadbent to win the seat once again; he had previously held it from 1996 to 1998. Broadbent was re-elected in the 2007 election.

The 1972 federal election saw Country Party candidate Arthur Hewson win the seat from third place and a primary vote of 16.6%. This is the lowest primary vote for a winning candidate in any federal election; Hewson overtook the Liberal candidate on preferences from the Democratic Labor Party and disendorsed sitting Liberal MP Alex Buchanan, and then defeated the Labor candidate on Liberal preferences.

Due to McMillan's role in the Gippsland massacres, there were proposals in the 2000s and 2010s to have the division renamed. It was finally renamed to the Division of Monash in 2018.

== Members ==
Image	Member	Party	Term	Notes
	Geoffrey Brown (1894–1955)	Liberal	10 December 1949 – 14 October 1955	Died in office
	Alex Buchanan (1905–1985)	Liberal	10 December 1955 – 1972	Lost preselection and then lost seat
	Alex Buchanan (1905–1985)	Independent	1972 – 2 December 1972	Lost preselection and then lost seat
	Arthur Hewson (1914–1999)	Country/National Country	2 December 1972 – 13 December 1975	Previously a member of the Victorian Legislative Council. Lost seat
	Barry Simon (1936–2004)	Liberal	13 December 1975 – 18 October 1980	Lost seat
	Barry Cunningham (1939–2018)	Labor	18 October 1980 – 24 March 1990	Served as Chief Government Whip in the House under Hawke. Lost seat
	John Riggall (1941–)	Liberal	24 March 1990 – 13 March 1993	Lost seat
	Barry Cunningham (1939–2018)	Labor	13 March 1993 – 2 March 1996	Lost seat
	Russell Broadbent (1950–)	Liberal	2 March 1996 – 3 October 1998	Previously held the Division of Corinella. Lost seat
	Christian Zahra (1973–)	Labor	3 October 1998 – 9 October 2004	Lost seat
	Russell Broadbent (1950–)	Liberal	9 October 2004 – 11 April 2019	Transferred to the Division of Monash after McMillan was abolished in 2019

== Election results ==
2016 Australian federal election: McMillan
Party	Candidate	Votes	%	±%
Liberal	Russell Broadbent	48,304	47.86	−2.50
Labor	Chris Buckingham	29,531	29.26	+4.21
Greens	Donna Lancaster	9,810	9.72	+2.10
Family First	Nathan Harding	3,418	3.39	+1.38
Animal Justice	Jennifer McAdam	3,022	2.99	+2.99
Rise Up Australia	Norman Baker	2,786	2.76	+2.09
Liberal Democrats	Jim McDonald	2,289	2.27	+2.27
Christians	Kathleen Ipsen	1,761	1.74	+1.74
Total formal votes		100,921	94.29	+0.40
Informal votes		6,115	5.71	−0.40
Turnout		107,036	92.11	−2.53
Two-party-preferred result
Liberal	Russell Broadbent	56,543	56.03	−5.80
Labor	Chris Buckingham	44,378	43.97	+5.80
Liberal hold		Swing	−5.80	
