= Electoral results for the Division of Corinella (1901–1906) =

Australian division election results

This is a list of electoral results for the Division of Corinella (1901–06) in Australian federal elections from the division's creation in 1901 until its abolition in 1906.

== Members ==
Member	Party	Term
James McCay	Protectionist	1901–1906

== Election results ==
=== Elections in the 1900s ===
==== 1903 ====
1903 Australian federal election: Corinella
Party	Candidate	Votes	%	±%
Protectionist	James McCay	unopposed		
Protectionist hold		Swing		

==== 1901 ====
1901 Australian federal election: Corinella
Party	Candidate	Votes	%	±%
Protectionist	James McCay	3,836	58.5	+58.5
Free Trade	Nicholas Fitzgerald	2,723	41.5	+41.5
Total formal votes		6,559	99.0	
Informal votes		69	1.0	
Turnout		6,628	56.8	
Protectionist win		(new seat)		
