= Barry Simon (politician) =

Australian politician

Member of the Australian Parliament for McMillan
- In office 13 December 1975 – 18 October 1980
- Preceded by: Arthur Hewson
- Succeeded by: Barry Cunningham

Personal details
- Born: 1 April 1936 Melbourne, Victoria
- Died: 7 July 2004 (aged 68)
- Party: Liberal Party of Australia
- Education: University of Melbourne
- Occupation: Teacher, barrister

Barry Douglas Simon (1 April 1936 – 7 July 2004) was an Australian politician. Born in Melbourne, he attended the University of Melbourne before becoming a teacher and barrister. He was a member of Berwick City Council and served as its mayor. In 1975, he was elected to the Australian House of Representatives as the Liberal member for McMillan, defeating Arthur Hewson, a member of the Liberals' Coalition partner the Country Party. He was defeated in 1980 by the Labor Party, largely due to the Democratic Labor Party's decision to direct its preferences to Labor in view of Simon's liberal views on abortion. For the same reason, Simon was targeted by the Right to Life organisation, which was credited as another factor in his defeat. Simon died in 2004.

Parliament of Australia
Preceded by Arthur Hewson	Member for McMillan; 1975–1980	Succeeded by Barry Cunningham
