= Alex Buchanan (politician) =

Australian politician (1905–1985)

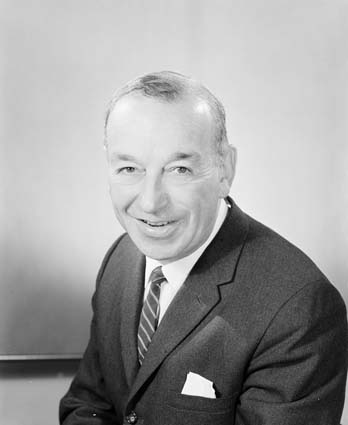

Member of the Australian Parliament for McMillan
- In office 10 December 1955 – 2 December 1972
- Preceded by: Geoffrey Brown
- Succeeded by: Arthur Hewson

Personal details
- Born: Alexander Andrew Buchanan; 4 October 1905 Fitzroy, Victoria, Australia
- Died: 10 September 1985 (aged 79) Berwick, Victoria, Australia
- Party: Liberal (1955–72); Independent (1972)
- Education: University of Melbourne
- Occupation: Farmer

Alexander Andrew Buchanan (4 October 1905 – 10 September 1985) was an Australian politician. Born in Fitzroy, the second son of four children of Herbert James Buchanan, a pastry-cook, and Emily Jane, his family later moved to Clifton Hill. He was educated from 1913 to 1919 at Scotch College. Buchanan's father was badly wounded in France in 1916 and this necessitated a schooling change to Hamilton College, before Buchanan won a boarding scholarship to Melbourne Grammar School restricted to sons of former soldiers. Whilst still at Scotch College, he attempted to enter the RAN College at Jervis Bay, passing the academic exams but being rejected at interview, a consequence, he suspected, of political pressure. His mother had firm views on the education of her son, suggesting he learn Japanese, with a view to future trading opportunities.

In 1923, Buchanan commenced work for a shipping and import firm, as a junior salesman of bicycles, hardware, cars and motorcycles. He developed an interest in overseas trade. Tariff changes made in 1930 during the Depression impacted the firm badly.

In 1929, he married Lydia Mavis Patricia Walton. Both he and his new wife lost their jobs, forcing him to sell soap, vacuum cleaners and other items door to door. In 1933, he was appointed as an agent for a Sydney-based hairdressing supplies business. He then established a business manufacturing hair-dressing products, assisted by his wife, and set up an agency of that business in Adelaide. Whilst he and his wife were returning from this agency, they were involved in a serious car accident, resulting in moderate injuries to Buchanan and more severe ones for his wife that severely impaired the operation of their business.

He served in the RAN Volunteer Reserve 1942–43. He returned to become a farmer at Beaconsfield, where his wife bred Saanen goats, and was an organiser of the Liberal Party in Victoria. In 1955, he was elected to the Australian House of Representatives as the Liberal member for McMillan. He held the seat until 1972, when he lost his Liberal endorsement to Barrie Armitrage. He contested the seat as an independent, and lost, finishing last in a field of five candidates with only 6.3 percent of the vote. However, his preferences ultimately helped elect Country Party candidate Arthur Hewson.

Buchanan died at his home in Berwick in 1985, 24 days short of his 80th birthday.

Parliament of Australia
Preceded by Geoffrey Brown	Member for McMillan; 1955–1972	Succeeded by Arthur Hewson
