= Christian Zahra =

Australian politician

Christian Zahra AM
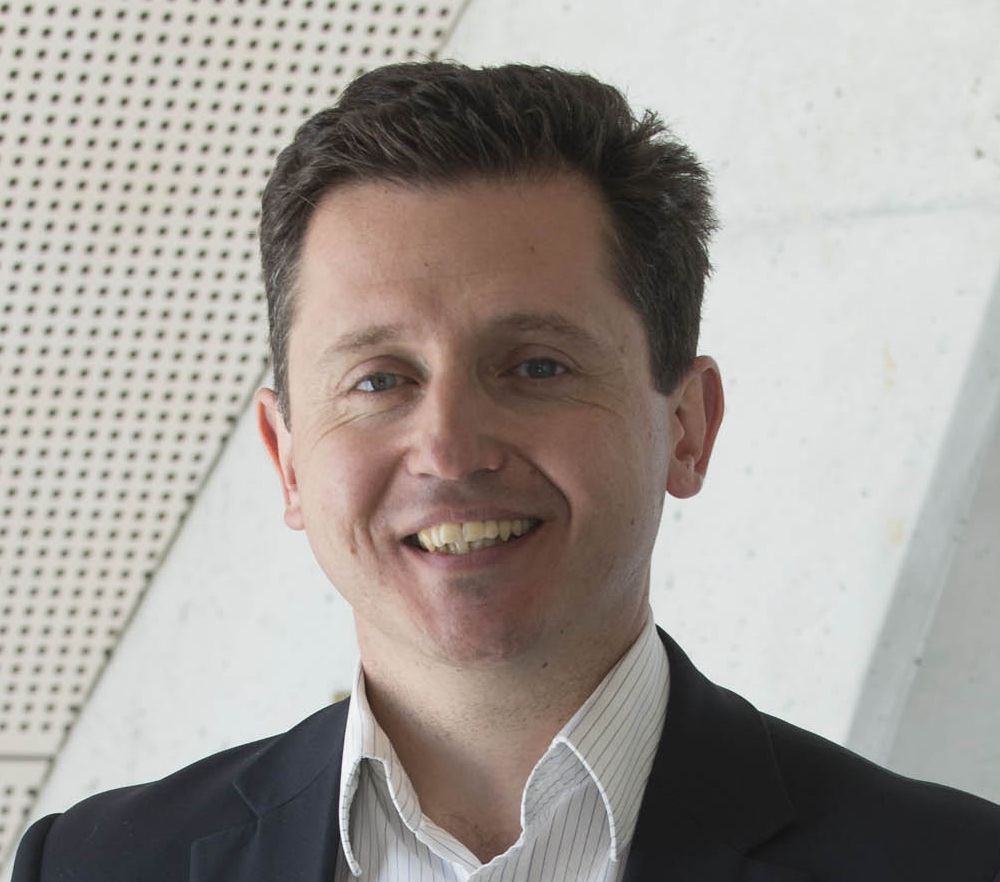

Member of the Australian Parliament for McMillan
- In office 3 October 1998 – 9 October 2004
- Preceded by: Russell Broadbent
- Succeeded by: Russell Broadbent

Personal details
- Born: Christian John Zahra; 8 April 1973 (age 53) Pietà, Malta
- Party: Australian Labor Party
- Education: La Trobe University
- Occupation: Strategy consultant Company director

Christian John Zahra AM (born 8 April 1973) was an Australian Labor Party member of the Australian House of Representatives from October 1998 to October 2004, representing the regional seat of McMillan, Victoria.

== Early life ==
Zahra was born in Malta and migrated to Australia with his family when he was three years old. He grew up and was educated in Traralgon, Victoria. He holds a Bachelor of Economics from La Trobe University and a Master of Assessment and Evaluation from the University of Melbourne.

== Political office ==
In 1998, at the age of 25, Christian Zahra was elected to represent the then Federal electorate of McMillan, based in Victoria's Latrobe Valley, defeating sitting Liberal MP Russell Broadbent. After a vigorous campaign, Mr Zahra experienced a swing to him of 2.64 per cent and was the only Labor candidate in the state to defeat an incumbent Liberal MP.

At the 2001 Federal Election, he was one of the few Australian Labor Party members to increase his share of the vote, gaining a 2PP swing to him of 1.9 per cent, after entering the election with a margin of less than 500 votes. After the election, he was appointed Parliamentary Secretary to the Shadow Minister for Communications. At that time, he was the youngest Federal MP ever to reach the status of parliamentary secretary. Additionally, Zahra served as Parliamentary Secretary to the Shadow Minister for Infrastructure, Transport and Regional Development.

At the 2004 election, following an unfavourable redistribution that removed his margin and turned the electorate of McMillan into a marginal Liberal seat Zahra was defeated by Russell Broadbent. Zahra began the campaign with a notional margin of 2.46 per cent, which had been wiped out by a redistribution that removed traditionally Labor voting towns and included more conservative towns in South Gippsland.

While in office, Zahra was variously described as a 'wunderkind' or 'young gun', but he distanced himself from descriptions like these, preferring instead to be known for his strong advocacy for his electorate.

== Public service ==
Before entering the Parliament, he was chief executive officer of the Aboriginal Health Service in Morwell, Victoria.

Since 2004, Zahra has served as a Director of the Victorian Energy Networks Corporation, Chair of the Victorian Government's Sustainable Timber Industry Council and Chairman of the Australian Government's $1 billion Regional Development Australia Fund Advisory Panel. He has also served as a Director of two Aboriginal organisations in the Kimberley, Waardi Limited and Nyimarr Limited. He was a Founding Director of the Regional Australia Institute and has served as its chair since 2021.

From January 2015 to January 2017, Zahra was chief executive officer of Wunan Foundation, a leading Aboriginal development organisation based in the East Kimberley. Before taking on this role he was a Director in the Strategy Group at KPMG Australia. Between 2017 and 2018, he was executive director of the National Catholic Education Commission.

Since 2017, Zahra has been Principal at Impact Partners Australia, a specialist policy and strategy consulting firm. In 2018 he rejoined the Board of Waardi Limited, a traditional owner economic development organisation based in Broome, Western Australia, as an Independent Non-Executive Director, where he served until 2023.

Zahra has been a Fellow of the Australian Institute of Company Directors since 2011.

In June 2018, Zahra was made a Member of the Order of Australia (AM) for "significant service to rural and regional development, to the advancement of Indigenous welfare, and to the Australian Parliament".

In July 2019, Zahra was appointed by the Victorian Government as a Member of the Panel of Administrators at South Gippsland Shire Council. The council was dismissed by the Victorian Government following the recommendation of the Commission of Inquiry into the council. The Panel acted as the South Gippsland Shire Council from 24 July 2019 until the next election for the Council in 2021.

In 2023, he was appointed as a Member of the Panel of Administrators at Whittlesea City Council. He served in this role until the municipal elections in 2024.

Parliament of Australia
Preceded by Russell Broadbent	Member for McMillan; 1998–2004	Succeeded by Russell Broadbent
