= Division of Corinella (1990–1996) =

Former Australian federal electoral division

Corinella Australian House of Representatives Division
- Created: 1990
- Abolished: 1996
- Namesake: Corinella
- Coordinates: 38°20′00″S 145°45′20″E

The Division of Corinella was an Australian Electoral Division in Victoria. The division was created in the 1990 and abolished in 1994, taking effect from the 1996 election. It was named for the town of Corinella, derived from the local Aboriginal language.

It was located in the outer south-eastern suburbs of Melbourne (primarily in Shire of Cranbourne) and parts of western Gippsland (primarily in Shire of Bass). It included the suburbs of Carrum Downs, Langwarrin, Cranbourne and Keysborough and the town of Wonthaggi. It replaced parts of Division of Holt and Division of Flinders when it was created. When it was abolished, it was replaced by the same two divisions, and to a smaller extent, the Division of Dunkley (Langwarrin) and the Division of Gippsland (Wonthaggi).

Corinella was a marginal seat, with Labor and Liberal parties each winning the seat once during its six years of existence.

== Members ==
Image	Member	Party	Term	Notes
	Russell Broadbent (1950–)	Liberal	24 March 1990 – 13 March 1993	Lost seat. Later elected to the Division of McMillan in 1996 and every election from 2004 to 2016, then elected to Division of Monash in 2019 and 2022 following re-distribution.
	Alan Griffin (1960–)	Labor	13 March 1993 – 2 March 1996	Transferred to the Division of Bruce after Corinella was abolished in 1996.

== See also ==
- Division of Corinella (1901-06)
