= Julian Hill (politician) =

Australian politician (born 1973)

The Honourable Julian Hill MP
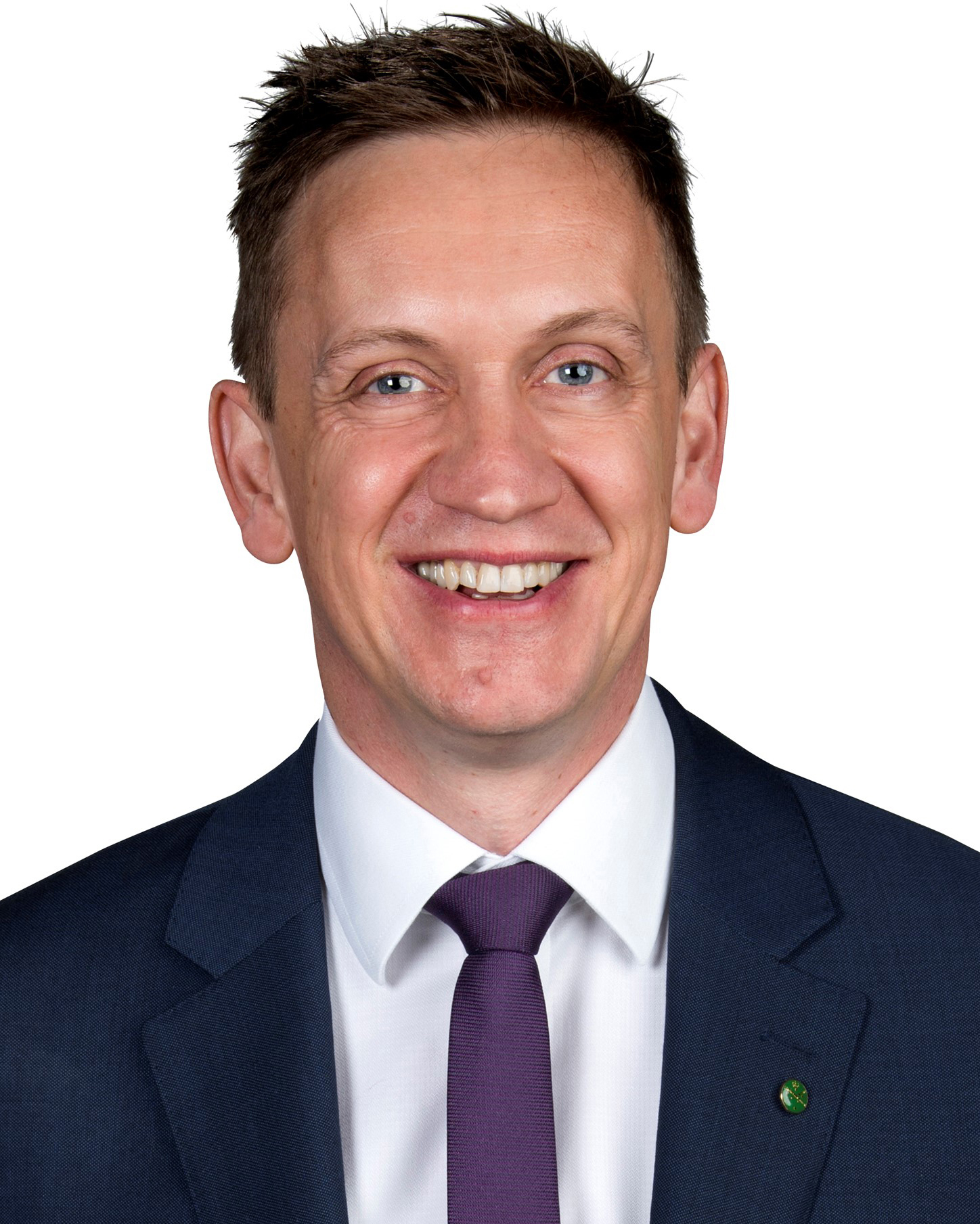

Assistant Minister for Citizenship, Customs and Multicultural Affairs
- Incumbent
- Assumed office 13 May 2025
- Prime Minister: Anthony Albanese
- Minister: Tony Burke (Citizenship and Customs); Anne Aly (Multicultural Affairs)
- Preceded by: Himself (as Assistant Minister for Citizenship and Multicultural Affairs)

Assistant Minister for International Education
- Incumbent
- Assumed office 13 May 2025
- Prime Minister: Anthony Albanese
- Minister: Jason Clare (Education)

Assistant Minister for Citizenship and Multicultural Affairs
- In office 29 July 2024 – 13 May 2025
- Prime Minister: Anthony Albanese
- Minister: Tony Burke
- Succeeded by: Himself (as Assistant Minister for Citizenship, Customs and Multicultural Affairs)

Member of the Australian Parliament for Bruce
- Incumbent
- Assumed office 2 July 2016
- Preceded by: Alan Griffin

4th Mayor of Port Phillip
- In office 9 March 2000 – 10 March 2002
- Preceded by: Dick Gross
- Succeeded by: Darren Ray

Personal details
- Born: Julian Christopher Hill; 1973 (age 52–53) Melbourne, Victoria, Australia
- Party: Labor
- Relations: Damian Hill (brother)
- Education: Monash University; Deakin University
- Occupation: Politician; Public servant
- Website: www.julianhillmp.com

Julian Christopher Hill (born 1973) is an Australian politician. He is a member of the Australian Labor Party (ALP) and has been a member of the House of Representatives since 2016, representing the Victorian seat of Bruce. He has been an assistant minister in the Albanese government since 2024.

Prior to his election to parliament, Hill served on the Port Phillip City Council from 1999 to 2005, including as the city's youngest mayor from 2000 to 2002. He subsequently worked as a public servant. Hill was elected to parliament at the 2016 federal election, succeeding Alan Griffin.

== Early life and education ==
Hill was born in Melbourne in 1973. He was raised by his mother after his father, a medical doctor, died when he was four years old. He has described how his mother, a nurse and midwife by profession, instilled in him the values of "responsibility, hard work and compassion".

He grew up in the east Melbourne suburb of Burwood and attended Wesley College from 1985 to 1990. He obtained a Bachelor of Science (chemistry) and a Bachelor of Laws degrees from Monash University in 2000, and a Graduate Certificate of International Relations from Deakin University in 2015.

Hill is one of only a handful of Federal Australian parliamentarians with a science degree, and has spoken of his "love of science as a kid ... growing up, one of my favourite possessions, and I had to get a few of them, was the old chemistry set."

He became a graduate member of the Australian Institute of Company Directors, and was elected a Fellow of the Institute of Public Administration Australia in 2012.

== Career ==
Hill started his career as an electorate officer and adviser to federal MP Alan Griffin from 1995 to 2000. From 2002 until his election to parliament in 2016, he worked as a senior public servant for the Victorian Government in the Departments of Transport, Sustainability and Environment, Planning and Community Development, and Economic Development, Jobs, Transport and Resources.

=== Councillor and mayor of Port Phillip ===
In 1999 Hill was elected a councillor of the City of Port Phillip and re-elected for a second term in 2002. In 2000 he was elected as the youngest ever mayor of the city at the age of 25 and served two terms.

As mayor, Hill led the city through a period of considerable and rapid change, including a development boom as inner city bayside suburbs rapidly gentrified. Hill led initiatives in the municipality, including transport planning, parking management, complex social policy reforms and the Greening Port Phillip program. As mayor, Hill signed the first friendship agreement between an Australian local government and an East Timorese town. Founded on the principles of community development, the Friends of Suai celebrated its 20th year in 2020.

In 2000, an article in The Age stated that " far from hiding his light in local government Hill is fast becoming the most outspoken Mayor in Melbourne." Questioned about being a young high-profile councilor and mayor, Hill commented that "[t]here is something insidious about saying, 'Aren't you too young to be doing this job?' It is the other end of the scale from saying, 'Oh, you're 60, your brain must be soft.'"

=== Parliamentary service ===
Hill was elected as the 5th Member for Bruce at the Federal election on 2 July 2016, defeating high-profile Liberal candidate Helen Kroger. Hill achieved a swing of 2.28% to Labor and a margin of 4.08%. Hill was re-elected in 2019, 2022 and 2025.

In 2018, as part of a redistribution altering electoral boundaries, media reports suggested Hill was the biggest beneficiary. He was reelected in 2019.

In 2023, Hill made a speech in Parliament that was partially written by OpenAI's ChatGPT. In the speech, Hill commented on the potentially destructive elements of the technology, stating that it had the ability to cause mass destruction.

Hill was the chair of the Australian Parliament's Joint Statutory Committee of Public Accounts and Audit from August 2022 until his appointment as Assistant Minister in July 2024. This Committee oversees the Commonwealth Auditor-General, the Parliamentary Budget Office and interrogates the Australian Government's expenditure, performance and financial statements. He was appointed Assistant Minister for Multicultural Affairs and Citizenship following a ministerial reshuffle on July 29, 2024.

After the re-election of the Labor government in the 2025 Australian federal election, Hill was appointed Assistant Minister for Citizenship, Customs and Multicultural Affairs and Assistant Minister for International Education in the second Albanese ministry.

== Views ==
Hill made it clear in his maiden speech he held strong views against the monarchy. In December 2019, he addressed the chamber on the issue, stating that when he was first elected it was a confronting moment for him to take an oath of allegiance to a foreigner. He spoke of feeling like a cheap traitor, going as far as stating that he crossed his fingers when taking his oath of allegiance.

In his first speech Hill stated: "I am conscious that as a rainbow Labor member my election is a very small step to adding to the diversity of this parliament, and I am proud to see more LGBTI Australians in this parliament than the last." He is a member of Labor's Left faction. Hill has championed Australian multiculturalism and spoken up about the importance of Australia embracing its human diversity to ensure future success; whether that be on the grounds of race, gender, sexuality or religion.

Hill faced criticism from representatives of the International Education industry after he gave an interview '[making] no apology' for his championing of reforms to the regulation of the sector, which were likely to lead to a reduced number of international students being granted visas into Australia.

== Personal life ==
Hill is gay, and has spoken of two former long-term partners, Lorien and David.

Hill has spoken in Parliament about "the enormous privilege and authentic human experience" he had nursing his mother at home for the 10 months before her death, after she was diagnosed with an incurable cancer in 2008.

Hill campaigned for amendment to Australian prescription drug laws following an incident in 2017 which left his daughter Elanor with a 64 cm blood clot after she was prescribed the oral contraceptive Diane-35 to use as an acne medication, which was not approved by the Therapeutic Goods Administration.

Hill's brother and only sibling was the actor and independent filmmaker Damian Hill, best known for writing and acting in the 2016 film Pawno. Damian died on 22 September 2018. Julian Hill presented the inaugural Damian Hill Independent Film Award, named in honour of his brother, at the 2019 Melbourne International Film Festival.

'Persistent rumours' as to Hill's residential address have followed him since his election to the seat of Bruce in 2016. Hill denied claims that he 'lived full time out of the electorate' with a statement confirming that he splits his time between an owned property in Port Melbourne, a rented apartment in Dandenong and a residence of undetermined status in Canberra.

== See also ==
- Members of the Australian House of Representatives, 2022–2025

Parliament of Australia
Preceded by Alan Griffin	Member for Bruce; 2016–present	Incumbent
