= Alan Griffin (politician) =

Australian politician (born 1960)

The Honourable Alan Griffin
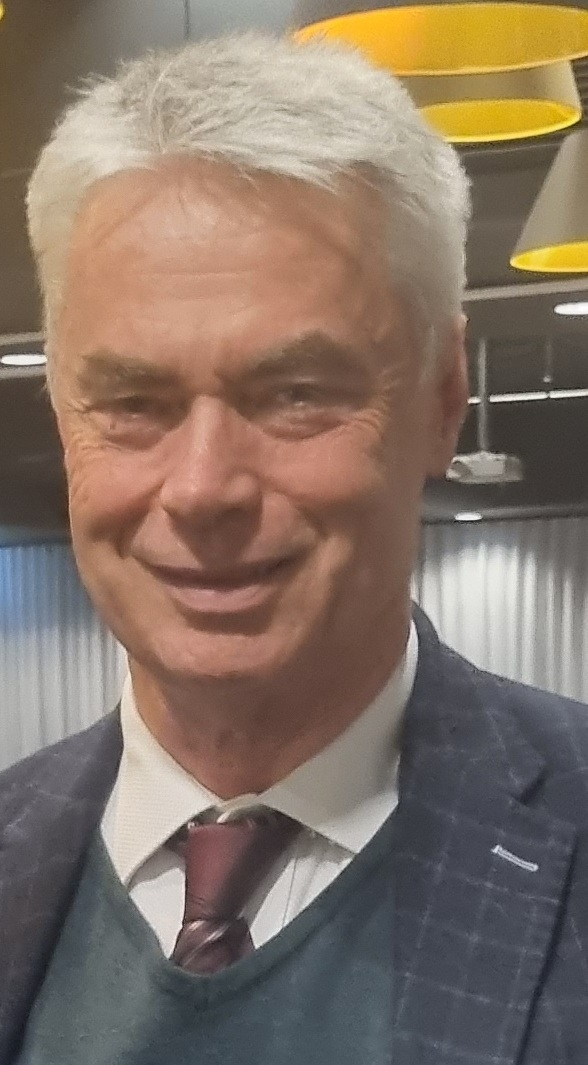
- Griffin in 2024

Member of the Australian Parliament for Bruce
- In office 2 March 1996 – 9 May 2016
- Preceded by: Julian Beale
- Succeeded by: Julian Hill

Member of the Australian Parliament for Corinella
- In office 13 March 1993 – 2 March 1996
- Preceded by: Russell Broadbent
- Succeeded by: Division abolished

Personal details
- Born: 23 February 1960 (age 66) Melbourne, Victoria, Australia
- Party: Labor
- Children: 3
- Occupation: Lobbyist

Alan Peter Griffin (born 23 February 1960) is an Australian lobbyist and former politician. He was a member of the House of Representatives from 1993 to 2016, representing the Victorian seats of Corinella and Bruce for the Australian Labor Party (ALP). He was a public servant, union organiser and ministerial adviser before entering parliament.

== Early life ==
Griffin was born on in Melbourne on 23 February 1960. He holds the degree of Bachelor of Arts from the Australian National University.

Prior to entering parliament Griffin worked as a public servant, union organiser and political staffer. He was active in the Federated Clerks' Union and in 1988 served as Lindsay Tanner's campaign manager in his successful bid to become state secretary of the union, the culmination of "a bitter factional battle to wrest the union from right-wing control". He was an adviser to Victorian state government minister Kay Setches from 1990 to 1991 and to federal government minister Simon Crean from 1991 to 1993. He also served on the Springvale City Council from 1991 to 1993.

== Political career ==
Griffin joined the ALP in 1979 and was chosen as a delegate to state conference in 1984. He was secretary of the party's Springvale South branch from 1990 to 1993.

Griffin was first elected to Parliament at the 1993 federal election, unseating the Liberal incumbent in Corinella, Russell Broadbent. He became a backbench supporter of Prime Minister Paul Keating's government. Corinella was abolished for the 1996 election, and Griffin followed most of his constituents into Bruce.

That seat had been in Liberal hands since its creation in 1955. However, it had been significantly altered by the latest redistribution, which gave Labor a slim majority. Griffin defeated Liberal incumbent Julian Beale by only 1195 votes, making him one of the few bright spots in Labor's severe defeat that year.

Griffin was elected to the Opposition Shadow Ministry in October 1998. He was Shadow Minister for Consumer Affairs and Shadow Minister Assisting the Shadow Minister for Health from 2003 to 2005. In June 2005, he was appointed Shadow Minister for Veterans' Affairs and Shadow Special Minister of State.

After Labor won government back in the 2007 federal election, new Prime Minister Kevin Rudd appointed Griffin Minister for Veterans' Affairs in the ministry. On 1 April 2010, he gained the portfolio of Minister for Defence Personnel. He retained these portfolios in Julia Gillard's first ministry but chose not to continue in the Second Gillard Ministry, which was sworn in on 14 September 2010 following the 2010 election.

In the lead-up to the 2012 Australian Labor Party leadership spill, following continued leadership tensions between Rudd and Gillard, Griffin was reported to be a "main numbers man" for Rudd and publicly criticised federal treasurer Wayne Swan for suggesting that Rudd was destabilising Gillard.

On 10 February 2015, Griffin announced he would not contest the next election, due in 2016. In March 2015, former City of Port Phillip Mayor Julian Hill was preselected unopposed to contest Bruce for the Labor Party.

== Later activities ==
Griffin began working as a lobbyist after leaving parliament, joining The Civic Group. As of 2021 he was listed on both the Victorian and federal registers of lobbyists and had been engaged to lobby on behalf of the owners of the Maddingley coal mine. In 2024, he and his former ministerial colleague Stephen Conroy were reported to be among the most influential lobbyists in Canberra, following the ALP's return to power at the 2022 election.

Griffin was described in 2021 as "a key powerbroker within Victorian Labor" who had been crucial in brokering a factional truce that allowed Sam Rae to win preselection for the seat of Hawke.

== See also ==
- First Rudd Ministry
- First Gillard Ministry

Political offices
Preceded by Bruce Billson	Minister for Veterans' Affairs; 2007–2010	Succeeded by Warren Snowdon
Preceded by Greg Combet	Minister for Defence Personnel; 2010	Succeeded by Warren Snowdon
Parliament of Australia
Preceded by Russell Broadbent	Member for Corinella; 1993–1996	Division abolished
Preceded by Julian Beale	Member for Bruce; 1996–2016	Succeeded by Julian Hill
