= Russell Broadbent =

Australian politician (born 1950)

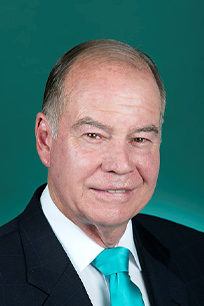

Member of the Australian Parliament for Monash
- In office 18 May 2019 – 3 May 2025
- Preceded by: Division created
- Succeeded by: Mary Aldred

Member of the Australian Parliament for McMillan
- In office 9 October 2004 – 18 May 2019
- Preceded by: Christian Zahra
- Succeeded by: Division abolished
- In office 2 March 1996 – 3 October 1998
- Preceded by: Barry Cunningham
- Succeeded by: Christian Zahra

Member of the Australian Parliament for Corinella
- In office 24 March 1990 – 13 March 1993
- Preceded by: Division created
- Succeeded by: Alan Griffin

President of the Shire of Pakenham
- In office 1984–1985

Councillor of the Shire of Pakenham
- In office 1981–1987

Personal details
- Born: 25 December 1950 (age 75) Koo Wee Rup, Victoria, Australia
- Party: Liberal (to 2023); Independent (from 2023)
- Spouse: Bronwyn
- Children: 3
- Occupation: Company director

Russell Evan Broadbent (born 25 December 1950) is an Australian politician who was a member of the House of Representatives. He is one of the longest-serving recent members of parliament, having served for a total of over 25 years, from 1990 to 1993, from 1996 to 1998, and from 2004 to 2025. He had represented the divisions of Corinella, McMillan, and most recently, Monash.

In November 2023, Broadbent stood down from the Liberal Party and its parliamentary party room and joined the crossbench in response to losing his party endorsement for Monash ahead of the 2025 federal election. He stood for re-election in the 2025 election as an independent, but failed to win the seat.

== Early life ==
Broadbent was born on 25 December 1950 in Koo Wee Rup, Victoria. He was a company director and self-employed retailer before entering politics. In the 1970s he was a "jumpsuit-wearing singer of show band The Trutones, which reportedly once opened for John Farnham".

Broadbent served on the Pakenham Shire Council from 1981 to 1987, including as shire president from 1984 to 1985. He also served as a commissioner of the Dandenong Valley Authority from 1984 to 1987 and as chairman of the Western Port Development Council from 1985 to 1990.

== Politics ==
Broadbent was an unsuccessful candidate for the Division of Streeton in the 1984 and 1987 federal elections. He first entered parliament as member for the marginal Division of Corinella at the 1990 federal election, but lost to Labor's Alan Griffin at the 1993 election. At the 1996 federal election, he challenged Barry Cunningham in what was then the suburban-rural seat of McMillan, and won it after a very close race, but was defeated by Labor's Christian Zahra at the 1998 election. Broadbent contested and was elected for McMillan again at the 2004 election, after a redistribution erased the Labor majority and made it notionally Liberal. He was re-elected at the 2007 federal election, at the same time as the Coalition lost government, and held the seat until 2025. He supported changing the name of his electorate to commemorate John Monash rather than Angus McMillan.

Broadbent served on the speaker's panel from 2013 to 2019. He served on a wide range of parliamentary committees, including as chair of the standing committees on privileges and members' interests (2013–2019) and treaties (2018–present), and of the select committee into intergenerational welfare dependence (2018–2019). In May 2017, Broadbent announced he would resign from the speaker's panel and his committee chairmanship to protest against the Turnbull government's inaction on aged care. He stated that ministers Greg Hunt and Ken Wyatt had misled him over the construction of a facility at Bunyip, within his electorate.

During 2004, Fairfax media reported Broadbent lobbied then Immigration Minister Amanda Vanstone to intervene to grant suspected Mafia figure Francesco Madafferi an Australian visa.

On 12 November 2023, Broadbent lost Liberal preselection for the 2025 Australian federal election to Mary Aldred, who is the daughter of his late parliamentary colleague Ken Aldred. Two days later, he resigned from the Liberal Party.

Broadbent was factionally unaligned during his time in the Liberal Party.

== Political views ==
=== Asylum seekers ===
During the Howard government, he came to national prominence after siding with Liberal dissident Petro Georgiou in advocating better treatment of detainees. He supports not charging long-term detainees for their detention. In 2017 he was described by The Sydney Morning Herald as "an outspoken critic of harsh asylum seeker policies", after delivering a speech in which he called the Manus Regional Processing Centre "unacceptable" and publicly opposed the Turnbull government's policy of re-settling asylum seekers in the United States.

=== Climate change ===
Broadbent has said that global warming is "an issue for Australia and an issue for the world." He is also an advocate for bike paths as a benefit to community health, transport and the environment. He has expressed interest in improving funding for Landcare Australia.

=== Indigenous Australians ===
In January 2021 he stated that the Morrison government should support the Uluru Statement from the Heart and move towards constitutional recognition of Indigenous Australians. Indeed, in February 2023, Broadbent and conservative Liberal powerbroker Karina Okotel wrote a book in support of constitutional recognition of Indigenous Australians. However, in September 2023, Broadbent ‘backflipped’ and announced that he would vote No in the subsequently unsuccessful referendum.

=== Same-sex marriage ===
In December 2017, Broadbent was one of only four members of the House of Representatives to vote against the Marriage Amendment (Definition and Religious Freedoms) Bill 2017, which legalised same-sex marriage in Australia.

=== COVID-19 ===
Broadbent took a personal decision not to be vaccinated against COVID-19, with any of the available vaccines, in 2021, and stated that he neither encouraged nor discouraged constituents to get vaccinated. His decision not to get vaccinated potentially rendered him unable to carry out his duties as an MP, due to a state mandate that all authorised workers in the state, including federal politicians, must be vaccinated. Broadbent caught COVID in January 2022 and self-administered ivermectin, the use of which to treat COVID was widely promoted by anti-vaccination groups at the time.

In February 2022, Broadbent made headlines after promoting ivermectin as a treatment for COVID-19 in Parliament, claiming that he and his wife had taken it after testing positive to the virus. He was one of a handful of Australian MPs known to have refused COVID-19 vaccination and is against COVID-19 vaccine mandates.

=== Taxation ===
In 2022 Broadbent opposed plans by Labor Prime Minister Anthony Albanese to continue with a series of tax cuts on high-income earners due to kick in in 2024 in contrast to his party's stance, arguing that cutting taxes on wealthy individuals in the poor economic situation following the COVID-19 pandemic was not appropriate.

=== Superannuation ===
In 2023, Broadbent voiced support for plans to remove tax breaks on superannuation balances over $3 million, which would add roughly $54 billion in tax revenue to government pockets. The removal of the tax cut has been suggested by social services groups to allow for more funding to be directed to Australians living in poverty.

Broadbent stated that if the funds can be used wisely to help the Australian people he would support the policy despite Albanese stating that he would not tax superannuation before the next election.

== Personal life ==
Broadbent has three children. As of 2021 he and his wife lived outside his then-electorate in Pakenham, Victoria, in the Division of La Trobe. In 2017 he bought an investment property in Palm Cove, Queensland.

Parliament of Australia
New division	Member for Corinella; 1990–1993	Succeeded by Alan Griffin
Preceded by Barry Cunningham	Member for McMillan; 1996–1998	Succeeded by Christian Zahra
Preceded by Christian Zahra	Member for McMillan; 2004–2019	Division abolished
Division created	Member for Monash; 2019–2025	Succeeded by Mary Aldred
