= Electoral results for the district of Benambra =

Political election

This is a list of electoral results for the Electoral district of Benambra in Victorian state elections.

== Members for Benambra ==
Member	Party	Term
Peter Wright	Liberal	1877–1880
Peter Wallace	Conservative	1880–1886
Peter Wright	Liberal	1886–1889
Albert Craven	Conservative	1889–1913
Albert Craven	Conservative Liberal	1889–1913
Albert Craven	Comm Liberal	1889–1913
John Leckie	Comm Liberal	1913–1917
Henry Beardmore	Economy	1917–1918
Henry Beardmore	Nationalist	1917–1931
Henry Beardmore	United Australia	1931–1932
Roy Paton	Country	1932–1947
Thomas Mitchell	Country	1947–1976
Thomas Mitchell	National	1947–1976
Lou Lieberman	Liberal	1976–1992
Tony Plowman	Liberal	1992–2006
Bill Tilley	Liberal	2006–present

== Election results ==
=== Elections in the 2020s ===
2022 Victorian state election: Benambra
Party	Candidate	Votes	%	±%
Liberal	Bill Tilley	17,658	42.9	+2.8
Independent	Jacqui Hawkins	13,038	31.7	+15.6
Labor	Mark Tait	5,375	13.1	−4.6
Greens	Luke Brady	1,592	3.9	+0.4
Animal Justice	Mike Fuery	1,170	2.8	+2.8
Family First	Janelle Stratton	815	2.0	+2.0
Liberal Democrats	Dean Rossiter	804	2.0	+2.0
Freedom	Adrian James O'Brien	683	1.7	+1.7
Total formal votes		41,135	95.1	+0.5
Informal votes		2,099	4.9	−0.5
Turnout		43,234	86.4	+0.5
Notional two-party-preferred count
Liberal	Bill Tilley	26,021	63.3	+3.9
Labor	Mark Tait	15,114	36.7	−3.9
Two-candidate-preferred result
Liberal	Bill Tilley	20,956	50.9	−1.7
Independent	Jacqui Hawkins	20,179	49.1	+1.7
Liberal hold		Swing	−1.7	

=== Elections in the 2010s ===
2018 Victorian state election: Benambra
Party	Candidate	Votes	%	±%
Liberal	Bill Tilley	16,515	39.86	−14.75
Labor	Mark Tait	7,467	18.02	−13.25
Independent	Jacqui Hawkins	6,687	16.14	+16.14
Independent	Jenny O'Connor	5,427	13.10	+13.10
Shooters, Fishers, Farmers	Josh Knight	3,774	9.11	+9.11
Greens	John Bardsley	1,565	3.78	−5.31
Total formal votes		41,435	94.66	−0.80
Informal votes		2,336	5.34	+0.80
Turnout		43,771	89.70	−3.17
Notional two-party-preferred count
Liberal	Bill Tilley	24,393	58.91	−0.76
Labor	Mark Tait	17,013	41.09	+0.76
Two-candidate-preferred result
Liberal	Bill Tilley	21,732	52.45	−7.23
Independent	Jacqui Hawkins	19,703	47.55	+47.55
Liberal hold		Swing	N/A	

2014 Victorian state election: Benambra
Party	Candidate	Votes	%	±%
Liberal	Bill Tilley	21,430	54.6	+6.0
Labor	Jennifer Podesta	12,273	31.3	+7.7
Greens	Richard Wellard	3,568	9.1	−1.7
Country Alliance	Philip Rourke	1,973	5.0	−1.9
Total formal votes		39,244	95.5	−0.3
Informal votes		1,863	4.5	+0.3
Turnout		41,107	92.9	+0.7
Two-party-preferred result
Liberal	Bill Tilley	23,452	59.7	−6.3
Labor	Jennifer Podesta	15,848	40.3	+6.3
Liberal hold		Swing	−6.3	

2010 Victorian state election: Benambra
Party	Candidate	Votes	%	±%
Liberal	Bill Tilley	18,424	55.86	+17.24
Labor	John Williams	7,537	22.85	−10.12
Greens	Jennifer O'Connor	3,658	11.09	+4.38
Country Alliance	Haden Macaulay	2,241	6.79	+6.79
Family First	Robert Cavedon	1,125	3.41	+0.73
Total formal votes		32,985	95.80	−0.87
Informal votes		1,447	4.20	+0.87
Turnout		34,432	92.45	+0.17
Two-party-preferred result
Liberal	Bill Tilley	21,909	66.48	+8.77
Labor	John Williams	11,045	33.52	−8.77
Liberal hold		Swing	+8.77	

=== Elections in the 2000s ===
2006 Victorian state election: Benambra
Party	Candidate	Votes	%	±%
Liberal	Bill Tilley	12,135	38.6	−1.5
Labor	Lisa Mahood	10,358	33.0	−5.1
National	Bill Baxter	5,680	18.1	+5.5
Greens	Helen Judith Robinson	2,109	6.7	−0.3
Family First	Martin Corboy	842	2.7	+2.7
Independent	Shane Pearce	296	0.9	+0.9
Total formal votes		31,420	96.7	+0.2
Informal votes		1,083	3.3	−0.2
Turnout		32,503	92.3	
Two-party-preferred result
Liberal	Bill Tilley	18,132	57.7	+3.7
Labor	Lisa Mahood	13,288	42.3	−3.7
Liberal hold		Swing	+3.7	

2002 Victorian state election: Benambra
Party	Candidate	Votes	%	±%
Liberal	Tony Plowman	12,179	40.1	−17.4
Labor	Barb Murdoch	11,558	38.1	−4.4
National	Geoff Reid	3,818	12.6	+12.6
Greens	Helen Lucas	2,111	7.0	+7.0
Christian Democrats	Hannah Seymour	684	2.3	+2.3
Total formal votes		30,350	96.4	−0.6
Informal votes		1,119	3.6	+0.6
Turnout		31,469	92.2	+0.3
Two-party-preferred result
Liberal	Tony Plowman	16,397	54.0	−3.5
Labor	Barb Murdoch	13,953	46.0	+3.5
Liberal hold		Swing	−3.5	

=== Elections in the 1990s ===
1999 Victorian state election: Benambra
Party	Candidate	Votes	%	±%
Liberal	Tony Plowman	18,016	57.1	−7.8
Labor	Barb Murdoch	13,561	42.9	+7.8
Total formal votes		31,577	97.1	−0.9
Informal votes		931	2.9	+0.9
Turnout		32,508	91.9	−1.4
Liberal hold		Swing	−7.8	

1996 Victorian state election: Benambra
Party	Candidate	Votes	%	±%
Liberal	Tony Plowman	19,452	62.9	+18.5
Labor	Michael Deuis	10,234	33.1	+4.4
Natural Law	Roslyn Johnson	1,261	4.1	+4.1
Total formal votes		30,947	98.0	+1.1
Informal votes		627	2.0	−1.1
Turnout		31,574	93.3	−1.0
Two-party-preferred result
Liberal	Tony Plowman	20,085	64.9	+0.2
Labor	Michael Deuis	10,859	35.1	−0.2
Liberal hold		Swing	+0.2	

1992 Victorian state election: Benambra
Party	Candidate	Votes	%	±%
Liberal	Tony Plowman	12,737	44.3	−11.5
Labor	Phil Burrows	8,251	28.7	+2.5
Independent	Nelson McIntosh	5,105	17.8	+17.8
Independent	Kevin Smith	1,760	6.1	+6.1
Independent	Rosslyn Murtagh	893	3.1	+3.1
Total formal votes		28,746	96.9	−0.7
Informal votes		924	3.1	+0.7
Turnout		29,670	94.3	
Two-party-preferred result
Liberal	Tony Plowman	18,572	64.7	−7.1
Labor	Phil Burrows	10,113	35.3	+7.1
Liberal hold		Swing	−7.1	

=== Elections in the 1980s ===
1988 Victorian state election: Benambra
Party	Candidate	Votes	%	±%
Liberal	Lou Lieberman	16,424	56.54	−13.02
Labor	Julie Nelson	7,670	26.40	−4.04
National	Judith Brewer	4,955	17.06	+17.06
Total formal votes		29,049	97.66	−0.38
Informal votes		696	2.34	+0.38
Turnout		29,745	90.87	−0.38
Two-party-preferred result
Liberal	Lou Lieberman	20,788	71.59	+2.03
Labor	Julie Nelson	8,250	28.41	−2.03
Liberal hold		Swing	+2.03	

1985 Victorian state election: Benambra
Party	Candidate	Votes	%	±%
Liberal	Lou Lieberman	18,525	69.6	+11.3
Labor	Virginia Coghill	8,105	30.4	−2.0
Total formal votes		26,630	98.0	
Informal votes		533	2.0	
Turnout		27,163	91.3	
Liberal hold		Swing	+3.1	

1982 Victorian state election: Benambra
Party	Candidate	Votes	%	±%
Liberal	Lou Lieberman	15,413	56.7	+4.2
Labor	Joe Murphy	8,679	32.0	+7.8
National	Charles Ross	3,071	11.3	−8.2
Total formal votes		27,163	97.7	+0.3
Informal votes		643	2.3	−0.3
Turnout		27,806	92.2	−0.7
Two-party-preferred result
Liberal	Lou Lieberman	18,177	66.9	−2.2
Labor	Joe Murphy	8,986	33.1	+2.2
Liberal hold		Swing	−2.2	

=== Elections in the 1970s ===
1979 Victorian state election: Benambra
Party	Candidate	Votes	%	±%
Liberal	Lou Lieberman	13,382	52.5	+26.5
Labor	Max Edgar	6,164	24.2	+0.2
National	John Bidgood	4,966	19.5	−17.1
Independent	Dudley Schubert	959	3.8	+3.8
Total formal votes		25,501	97.3	−0.5
Informal votes		693	2.7	+0.5
Turnout		26,164	92.9	+0.3
Two-party-preferred result
Liberal	Lou Lieberman	17,626	69.1	−0.7
Labor	Max Edgar	7,875	30.9	+0.7
Liberal hold		Swing	−0.7	

1976 Victorian state election: Benambra
Party	Candidate	Votes	%	±%
National	Bill Baxter	8,581	36.6	−6.2
Liberal	Lou Lieberman	6,107	26.0	+4.0
Labor	Ken Coghill	5,632	24.0	−3.9
Independent	Robert Wiltshire	2,729	11.6	+11.6
Democratic Labor	Kevin Redfern	420	1.8	−5.4
Total formal votes		23,469	97.8	
Informal votes		530	2.2	
Turnout		23,999	92.6	
Two-candidate-preferred result
Liberal	Lou Lieberman	12,167	51.8	+51.8
National	Bill Baxter	11,302	48.2	−21.7
Liberal gain from National		Swing	N/A	

1973 Victorian state election: Benambra
Party	Candidate	Votes	%	±%
Country	Tom Mitchell	9,462	49.4	+2.1
Labor	Ian Thomas	5,525	28.8	+3.7
Liberal	Henry Petty	2,748	14.3	+3.7
Democratic Labor	James Osmotherly	1,435	7.5	−2.8
Total formal votes		19,170	97.3	+1.0
Informal votes		528	2.7	−1.0
Turnout		19,698	94.4	−0.7
Two-party-preferred result
Country	Tom Mitchell	13,305	69.4	−1.4
Labor	Ian Thomas	5,865	30.6	+1.4
Country hold		Swing	−1.4	

1970 Victorian state election: Benambra
Party	Candidate	Votes	%	±%
Country	Tom Mitchell	8,233	47.3	−7.4
Labor	Edwin Ure	4,365	25.1	+5.0
Liberal	Robert Prior	1,849	10.6	−2.0
Democratic Labor	Francis Keenan	1,803	10.4	−2.2
Independent	John Hicks	1,164	6.7	+6.7
Total formal votes		17,414	96.3	−1.1
Informal votes		663	3.7	+1.1
Turnout		18,077	95.1	−0.3
Two-party-preferred result
Country	Tom Mitchell	12,334	70.8	−6.0
Labor	Edwin Ure	5,080	29.2	+6.0
Country hold		Swing	−6.0	

=== Elections in the 1960s ===
1967 Victorian state election: Benambra
Party	Candidate	Votes	%	±%
Country	Tom Mitchell	9,440	54.7	+4.9
Labor	Anthony Lamb	3,469	20.1	−2.1
Liberal	Henry Petty	2,177	12.6	−2.0
Democratic Labor	Francis Keenan	2,169	12.6	−0.8
Total formal votes		17,255	97.4	
Informal votes		467	2.6	
Turnout		17,722	95.4	
Two-party-preferred result
Country	Tom Mitchell	13,242	76.8	+1.6
Labor	Anthony Lamb	4,013	23.2	−1.6
Country hold		Swing	+1.6	

1964 Victorian state election: Benambra
Party	Candidate	Votes	%	±%
Country	Tom Mitchell	11,140	50.4	−0.3
Labor	Edwin Ure	4,646	21.0	−2.0
Democratic Labor	John Drummond	3,228	14.6	−1.5
Liberal and Country	Ronald Petty	3,101	14.0	+3.8
Total formal votes		22,115	97.9	−0.1
Informal votes		478	2.1	+0.1
Turnout		22,593	94.6	−0.1
Two-party-preferred result
Country	Tom Mitchell	16,677	75.4	+1.8
Labor	Edwin Ure	5,438	24.6	−1.8
Country hold		Swing	+1.8	

1961 Victorian state election: Benambra
Party	Candidate	Votes	%	±%
Country	Tom Mitchell	10,835	50.7	+0.6
Labor	Reginald Mortimer	4,920	23.0	+2.3
Democratic Labor	William Findlay	3,445	16.1	0.0
Liberal and Country	Robert Kilpatrick	2,171	10.2	−2.8
Total formal votes		21,371	98.0	−0.7
Informal votes		435	2.0	+0.7
Turnout		21,806	94.7	+0.5
Two-party-preferred result
Country	Tom Mitchell	15,718	73.6	−2.0
Labor	Reginald Mortimer	5,653	26.4	+2.0
Country hold		Swing	−2.0	

=== Elections in the 1950s ===
1958 Victorian state election: Benambra
Party	Candidate	Votes	%	±%
Country	Tom Mitchell	10,087	50.1	
Labor	Francis Taylor	4,172	20.7	
Democratic Labor	Henry Richards	3,247	16.1	
Liberal and Country	James Shannon	2,612	13.0	
Total formal votes		20,118	98.7	
Informal votes		258	1.3	
Turnout		20,376	94.2	
Two-party-preferred result
Country	Tom Mitchell	15,197	75.6	
Labor	Francis Taylor	4,921	24.4	
Country hold		Swing		

1955 Victorian state election: Benambra
Party	Candidate	Votes	%	±%
Country	Tom Mitchell	7,595	40.3	
Liberal and Country	Norman Attree	4,734	25.1	
Labor (A-C)	William Findlay	4,140	22.0	
Independent	James Prendergast	2,383	12.7	
Total formal votes		18,852	98.3	
Informal votes		329	1.7	
Turnout		19,181	93.9	
Two-candidate-preferred result
Country	Tom Mitchell	9,803	52.0	
Liberal and Country	Norman Attree	9,049	48.0	
Country hold		Swing		

1952 Victorian state election: Benambra
Party	Candidate	Votes	%	±%
Country	Tom Mitchell	7,241	57.3	−16.7
Labor	Geoffrey Holland	5,386	42.7	+42.7
Total formal votes		12,627	98.9	+1.0
Informal votes		139	1.1	−1.0
Turnout		12,766	90.9	−1.3
Country hold		Swing	N/A	

1950 Victorian state election: Benambra
Party	Candidate	Votes	%	±%
Country	Tom Mitchell	9,050	74.0	−26.0
Liberal and Country	James Ronan	3,187	26.0	+26.0
Total formal votes		12,237	97.9	
Informal votes		264	2.1	
Turnout		12,501	92.2	
Country hold		Swing	N/A	

=== Elections in the 1940s ===
1947 Victorian state election: Benambra
Party	Candidate	Votes	%	±%
Country	Tom Mitchell	unopposed		
Country hold		Swing	N/A	

1947 Benambra state by-election
Party	Candidate	Votes	%	±%
Country	Tom Mitchell	6,477	58.6	+1.9
Labor	Frank Andrews	4,569	41.4	−1.9
Total formal votes		11,046	99.5	+0.2
Informal votes		54	0.5	−0.2
Turnout		11,100	88.4	+2.5
Country hold		Swing	+1.9	

1945 Victorian state election: Benambra
Party	Candidate	Votes	%	±%
Country	Roy Paton	5,949	56.7	
Labor	Charles Pollard	4,537	43.3	
Total formal votes		10,486	99.3	
Informal votes		78	0.7	
Turnout		10,564	85.9	
Country hold		Swing		

1943 Victorian state election: Benambra
Party	Candidate	Votes	%	±%
Country	Roy Paton	5,481	68.9	−31.1
Independent	Francis Andrews	2,470	31.1	+31.1
Total formal votes		7,951	98.7	
Informal votes		102	1.3	
Turnout		8,053	84.7	
Country hold		Swing	N/A	

1940 Victorian state election: Benambra
Party	Candidate	Votes	%	±%
Country	Roy Paton	unopposed		
Country hold		Swing		

=== Elections in the 1930s ===
1937 Victorian state election: Benambra
Party	Candidate	Votes	%	±%
Country	Roy Paton	5,072	60.4	+7.6
United Australia	Thomas Mitchell	3,329	39.6	−7.6
Total formal votes		8,401	99.3	+0.9
Informal votes		61	0.7	−0.9
Turnout		8,462	94.5	+0.8
Country hold		Swing	+7.6	

1935 Victorian state election: Benambra
Party	Candidate	Votes	%	±%
Country	Roy Paton	4,397	52.8	+52.8
United Australia	Tom Mitchell	3,928	47.2	−52.8
Total formal votes		8,325	98.4	
Informal votes		133	1.6	
Turnout		8,458	93.7	
Country hold		Swing	N/A	

1932 Benambra state by-election
Party	Candidate	Votes	%	±%
Labor	John McKenzie-McHarg	2,977	36.4	
Country	Roy Paton	2,635	32.2	
United Australia	Andrew Harris	2,567	31.4	
Total formal votes		8,179	99.2	
Informal votes		66	0.8	
Turnout		8,245	86.6	
Two-party-preferred result
Country	Roy Paton	4,956	60.6	
Labor	John McKenzie-McHarg	3,223	39.4	
Country gain from United Australia		Swing	N/A	

1932 Victorian state election: Benambra
Party	Candidate	Votes	%	±%
United Australia	Henry Beardmore	unopposed		
United Australia hold		Swing		

=== Elections in the 1920s ===
1929 Victorian state election: Benambra
Party	Candidate	Votes	%	±%
Nationalist	Henry Beardmore	unopposed		
Nationalist hold		Swing	N/A	

1927 Victorian state election: Benambra
Party	Candidate	Votes	%	±%
Nationalist	Henry Beardmore	unopposed		
Nationalist hold		Swing		

1924 Victorian state election: Benambra
Party	Candidate	Votes	%	±%
Nationalist	Henry Beardmore	2,714	74.8	−25.2
Country	John Hall	914	25.2	+25.2
Total formal votes		3,627	99.3	
Informal votes		27	0.7	
Turnout		3,654	54.5	
Nationalist hold		Swing	N/A	

1921 Victorian state election: Benambra
Party	Candidate	Votes	%	±%
Nationalist	Henry Beardmore	unopposed		
Nationalist hold		Swing		

1920 Victorian state election: Benambra
Party	Candidate	Votes	%	±%
Nationalist	Henry Beardmore	2,928	86.5	+37.5
Ind. Nationalist	Edward Clutterbuck	455	13.5	+13.5
Total formal votes		3,383	91.4	−5.2
Informal votes		320	8.6	+5.2
Turnout		3,703	56.0	+4.8
Nationalist hold		Swing	N/A	

=== Elections in the 1910s ===
1917 Victorian state election: Benambra
Party	Candidate	Votes	%	±%
Nationalist	Henry Beardmore	1,626	49.0	
Nationalist	Leslie Sambell	1,065	32.1	
Nationalist	George Jephcott	630	19.0	
Total formal votes		3,321	96.6	−1.6
Informal votes		116	3.4	+1.6
Turnout		3,437	51.2	−10.4
Two-candidate-preferred result
Nationalist	Henry Beardmore	2,100	63.2	
Nationalist	Leslie Sambell	1,221	36.8	
Nationalist hold		Swing	N/A	

1917 Benambra state by-election
Party	Candidate	Votes	%	±%
Nationalist	Leslie Sambell	1,117	34.0	N/A
Nationalist	David Langlands	752	22.9	N/A
Nationalist	Henry Beardmore	715	21.8	N/A
Nationalist	George Jephcott	705	21.5	N/A
Total formal votes		3,289	97.1	−1.1
Informal votes		98	2.9	+1.1
Turnout		3,387	47.3	−14.3
Two-candidate-preferred result
Nationalist	Henry Beardmore	1,779	54.1	
Nationalist	Leslie Sambell	1,506	45.9	
Nationalist hold		Swing	N/A	

1914 Victorian state election: Benambra
Party	Candidate	Votes	%	±%
Liberal	John Leckie	2,183	50.2	−11.9
Labor	John Ross	1,668	38.3	+0.5
Independent	Jorgen Petersen	500	11.5	+11.5
Total formal votes		4,351	98.2	0.0
Informal votes		82	1.8	0.0
Turnout		4,433	61.6	−7.5
Two-party-preferred result
Liberal	John Leckie		60.6	−1.5
Labor	John Ross		39.4	+1.5
Liberal hold		Swing	−1.5	

- Two party preferred vote was estimated.

1911 Victorian state election: Benambra
Party	Candidate	Votes	%	±%
Liberal	Albert Craven	2,790	62.1	+3.2
Labor	Abraham Wright	1,699	37.8	−3.2
Total formal votes		4,489	98.2	−1.4
Informal votes		82	1.8	+1.4
Turnout		4,571	69.1	+12.3
Liberal hold		Swing	+3.2	
