= Electoral results for the Division of Indi =

Results for Australian federal electoral division in north-east Victoria

This is a list of electoral results for the Division of Indi in Australian federal elections from the division's creation in 1901 until the present.

== Members ==
Member	Party	Term
Isaac Isaacs	Protectionist	1901–1906
Joseph Brown	Anti-Socialist	1906–1909
Joseph Brown	Liberal	1909–1910
Parker Moloney	Labour	1910–1913
Cornelius Ahern	Liberal	1913–1914
Parker Moloney	Labor	1914–1917
John Leckie	Nationalist	1917–1919
Robert Cook	Victorian Farmers/Country	1919–1928
Paul Jones	Labor	1928–1931
William Hutchinson	United Australia	1931–1937
John McEwen	Country	1937–1949
William Bostock	Liberal	1949–1958
Mac Holten	Country/National Country	1958–1977
Ewen Cameron	Liberal	1977–1993
Lou Lieberman	Liberal	1993–2001
Sophie Mirabella	Liberal	2001–2013
Cathy McGowan	Independent	2013–2019
Helen Haines	Independent	2019–present

== Election results ==
=== Elections in the 2020s ===
==== 2025 ====
2025 Australian federal election: Indi
Party	Candidate	Votes	%	±%
Independent	Helen Haines			
Labor	Mitch Bridges			
Liberal	James Trenery			
One Nation	Athol Thomas			
Greens	Alysia Regan			
Libertarian	Tim Quilty			
Family First	Michael White			
Legalise Cannabis	Ben Howman			
Independent	Mark McFarlane			
Total formal votes				
Informal votes				
Turnout				

==== 2022 ====
2022 Australian federal election: Indi
Party	Candidate	Votes	%	±%
Independent	Helen Haines	41,319	40.68	+8.33
Liberal	Ross Lyman	30,995	30.52	−4.57
Labor	Nadia David	8,723	8.59	−3.50
One Nation	Beth Stevens	5,366	5.28	+5.28
National	Liz Fisher	3,854	3.79	−5.66
Greens	Benjamin Gilbert	3,626	3.57	−0.64
United Australia	Stephen Williams	2,558	2.52	−1.42
Liberal Democrats	Julian Fidge	2,300	2.26	+2.26
Animal Justice	Angel Aleksov	1,749	1.72	+1.72
Justice	Lachlan O'Connell	1,074	1.06	−1.80
Total formal votes		101,564	94.53	−1.11
Informal votes		5,880	5.47	+1.11
Turnout		107,444	91.48	−2.88
Notional two-party-preferred count
Liberal	Ross Lyman	56,123	55.26	−7.47
Labor	Nadia David	45,441	44.74	+7.47
Two-candidate-preferred result
Independent	Helen Haines	59,861	58.94	+7.55
Liberal	Ross Lyman	41,703	41.06	−7.55
Independent hold		Swing	+7.55	

Alluvial diagram for preference flows in the seat of Indi in the 2022 federal election. indicates at what stage the winning candidate had over 50% of the votes and was declared the winner.

=== Elections in the 2010s ===
==== 2019 ====
2019 Australian federal election: Indi
Party	Candidate	Votes	%	±%
Liberal	Steve Martin	35,426	35.09	+7.29
Independent	Helen Haines	32,664	32.35	−1.06
Labor	Eric Kerr	12,202	12.09	+2.03
National	Mark Byatt	9,538	9.45	−8.30
Greens	Helen Robinson	4,255	4.21	+0.25
United Australia	Shane Wheatland	3,980	3.94	+3.94
Justice	Jason Whalley	2,891	2.86	+2.86
Total formal votes		100,956	95.64	+2.21
Informal votes		4,601	4.36	−2.21
Turnout		105,557	93.60	+0.13
Notional two-party-preferred count
Liberal	Steve Martin	63,332	62.73	+7.72
Labor	Eric Kerr	37,624	37.27	−7.72
Two-candidate-preferred result
Independent	Helen Haines	51,886	51.39	−4.13
Liberal	Steve Martin	49,070	48.61	+4.13
Independent gain from Independent		Swing	−4.13	

Sitting member Cathy McGowan (independent) did not contest the election and endorsed the candidacy of Helen Haines (independent).

==== 2016 ====
2016 Australian federal election: Indi
Party	Candidate	Votes	%	±%
Independent	Cathy McGowan	31,336	34.76	+3.58
Liberal	Sophie Mirabella	24,887	27.61	−17.07
National	Marty Corboy	15,525	17.22	+17.22
Labor	Eric Kerr	8,826	9.79	−1.86
Greens	Jenny O'Connor	3,445	3.82	+0.40
Country	Julian Fidge	1,863	2.07	+2.07
Independent	Alan Lappin	1,757	1.95	+1.95
Rise Up Australia	Vincent Ferrando	1,150	1.28	+0.17
Liberal Democrats	Tim Quilty	886	0.98	+0.98
Independent	Ray Dyer	462	0.51	+0.51
Total formal votes		90,137	93.47	−1.44
Informal votes		6,299	6.53	+1.44
Turnout		96,436	92.96	−2.15
Notional two-party-preferred count
Liberal	Sophie Mirabella	49,038	54.40	−4.70
Labor	Eric Kerr	41,099	45.60	+4.70
Two-candidate-preferred result
Independent	Cathy McGowan	49,421	54.83	+4.58
Liberal	Sophie Mirabella	40,716	45.17	−4.58
Independent hold		Swing	+4.58	

==== 2013 ====
2013 Australian federal election: Indi
Party	Candidate	Votes	%	±%
Liberal	Sophie Mirabella	39,785	44.68	−7.17
Independent	Cathy McGowan	27,763	31.18	+31.18
Labor	Robyn Walsh	10,375	11.65	−16.54
Greens	Jenny O'Connor	3,041	3.42	−6.21
Palmer United	Robert Murphy	2,417	2.71	+2.71
Sex Party	Helma Aschenbrenner	1,402	1.57	+1.57
Family First	Rick Leeworthy	1,330	1.49	−2.24
Rise Up Australia	Robert Dudley	985	1.11	+1.11
Independent	Jennifer Podesta	841	0.94	+0.94
Katter's Australian	Phil Rourke	615	0.69	+0.69
Bullet Train	William Hayes	489	0.55	+0.55
Total formal votes		89,043	94.91	−1.18
Informal votes		4,774	5.09	+1.18
Turnout		93,817	95.17	+0.56
Notional two-party-preferred count
Liberal	Sophie Mirabella	52,625	59.10	+0.11
Labor	Robyn Walsh	36,418	40.90	−0.11
Two-candidate-preferred result
Independent	Cathy McGowan	44,741	50.25	+50.25
Liberal	Sophie Mirabella	44,302	49.75	−10.17
Independent gain from Liberal		Swing	N/A	

==== 2010 ====
2010 Australian federal election: Indi
Party	Candidate	Votes	%	±%
Liberal	Sophie Mirabella	44,555	52.62	−1.76
Labor	Zuvele Leschen	23,034	27.20	−4.92
Greens	Jenny O'Connor	8,000	9.45	+1.87
Independent	Alan Lappin	4,945	5.84	+5.84
Family First	Robert Cavedon	3,190	3.77	−0.05
Democrats	Mark Carey	947	1.12	−0.57
Total formal votes		84,671	96.09	−1.23
Informal votes		3,449	3.91	+1.23
Turnout		88,120	94.80	−1.00
Two-party-preferred result
Liberal	Sophie Mirabella	50,755	59.94	+0.75
Labor	Zuvele Leschen	33,916	40.06	−0.75
Liberal hold		Swing	+0.75	

=== Elections in the 2000s ===
==== 2007 ====
2007 Australian federal election: Indi
Party	Candidate	Votes	%	±%
Liberal	Sophie Mirabella	46,052	54.38	−8.25
Labor	Zuvele Leschen	27,203	32.12	+5.89
Greens	Helen Robinson	6,416	7.58	+1.15
Family First	Jim Rainey	3,232	3.82	−0.22
Democrats	Sarah Benson	1,434	1.69	+1.69
Citizens Electoral Council	Jeremy Beck	354	0.42	−0.25
Total formal votes		84,691	97.32	+0.20
Informal votes		2,332	2.68	−0.20
Turnout		87,023	95.77	+0.40
Two-party-preferred result
Liberal	Sophie Mirabella	50,132	59.19	−7.10
Labor	Zuvele Leschen	34,559	40.81	+7.10
Liberal hold		Swing	−7.10	

==== 2004 ====
2004 Australian federal election: Indi
Party	Candidate	Votes	%	±%
Liberal	Sophie Panopoulos	51,834	62.63	+21.55
Labor	John Williams	21,710	26.23	−1.28
Greens	Jenny O'Connor	5,321	6.43	+2.47
Family First	Warren McMartin	3,341	4.04	+4.04
Citizens Electoral Council	Merrill Christine Bailey	558	0.67	+0.67
Total formal votes		82,764	97.12	+2.24
Informal votes		2,454	2.88	−2.24
Turnout		85,218	95.37	+0.01
Two-party-preferred result
Liberal	Sophie Panopoulos	54,863	66.29	+5.59
Labor	John Williams	27,901	33.71	−5.59
Liberal hold		Swing	+5.59	

==== 2001 ====
2001 Australian federal election: Indi
Party	Candidate	Votes	%	±%
Liberal	Sophie Panopoulos	31,152	40.07	−10.79
Labor	Barbara Murdoch	21,014	27.02	−1.41
National	Don Chambers	9,552	12.29	+12.29
Independent	Nelson McIntosh	5,284	6.80	+6.80
One Nation	Lyn Bennetts	3,079	3.96	−3.98
Greens	Michael Wardle	2,956	3.80	+1.40
Democrats	Robert Chuck	2,920	3.76	−1.12
	Pat Adams	895	1.15	+1.15
Christian Democrats	Philip Seymour	884	1.14	+1.14
Total formal votes		77,736	94.78	−1.34
Informal votes		4,281	5.22	+1.34
Turnout		82,017	95.91	
Two-party-preferred result
Liberal	Sophie Panopoulos	47,535	61.19	+1.08
Labor	Barbara Murdoch	30,201	38.81	−1.08
Liberal hold		Swing	+1.08	

=== Elections in the 1990s ===
==== 1998 ====
1998 Australian federal election: Indi
Party	Candidate	Votes	%	±%
Liberal	Lou Lieberman	38,590	50.87	−11.73
Labor	Zuvele Leschen	21,572	28.43	+0.40
One Nation	John Anderson	6,023	7.94	+7.94
Democrats	Kevin Smith	3,708	4.89	−2.91
Australia First	Brian Robson	2,157	2.84	+2.84
Greens	Tim Bardsley	1,825	2.41	+2.41
Natural Law	Susan Griffith	738	0.97	−0.61
Independent	Norm Ryan	454	0.60	+0.60
Independent	David Maroney	431	0.57	+0.57
Independent	Jurek Paz	368	0.49	+0.49
Total formal votes		75,866	96.12	−1.57
Informal votes		3,061	3.88	+1.57
Turnout		78,927	96.18	+0.25
Two-party-preferred result
Liberal	Lou Lieberman	45,600	60.11	−7.69
Labor	Zuvele Leschen	30,266	39.89	+7.69
Liberal hold		Swing	−7.69	

==== 1996 ====
1996 Australian federal election: Indi
Party	Candidate	Votes	%	±%
Liberal	Lou Lieberman	47,097	62.59	+18.33
Labor	Zuvele Leschen	21,091	28.03	−5.92
Democrats	Kevin Smith	5,867	7.80	+7.48
Natural Law	Bruce Lusher	1,190	1.58	−0.25
Total formal votes		75,245	97.69	−0.10
Informal votes		1,778	2.31	+0.10
Turnout		77,023	95.93	−0.30
Two-party-preferred result
Liberal	Lou Lieberman	50,838	67.79	+4.50
Labor	Zuvele Leschen	24,154	32.21	−4.50
Liberal hold		Swing	+4.50	

==== 1993 ====
1993 Australian federal election: Indi
Party	Candidate	Votes	%	±%
Liberal	Lou Lieberman	28,951	40.65	−9.49
Labor	Jenny Luck	24,475	34.36	+9.56
National	Philip Pullar	16,483	23.14	+23.14
Natural Law	Jeanette Martin	1,317	1.85	+1.85
Total formal votes		71,226	97.75	+0.09
Informal votes		1,637	2.25	−0.09
Turnout		72,863	96.23	
Two-party-preferred result
Liberal	Lou Lieberman	44,767	62.88	−1.32
Labor	Jenny Luck	26,431	37.12	+1.32
Liberal hold		Swing	−1.32	

==== 1990 ====
1990 Australian federal election: Indi
Party	Candidate	Votes	%	±%
Liberal	Ewen Cameron	33,483	50.1	+12.8
Labor	John Dennis	16,561	24.8	−8.5
Independent	Barry Tattersall	9,890	14.8	+14.8
Democrats	Ian Deegan	6,844	10.2	+10.2
Total formal votes		66,778	97.7	
Informal votes		1,596	2.3	
Turnout		68,374	95.6	
Two-party-preferred result
Liberal	Ewen Cameron	42,824	64.2	+1.7
Labor	John Dennis	23,880	35.8	−1.7
Liberal hold		Swing	+1.7	

=== Elections in the 1980s ===
==== 1987 ====
1987 Australian federal election: Indi
Party	Candidate	Votes	%	±%
Liberal	Ewen Cameron	24,844	37.4	+4.1
Labor	Danny Walsh	22,065	33.2	−1.1
National	Philip Pullar	13,435	20.2	−8.1
Independent	Rob Taylor	5,415	8.2	+8.2
Pensioner	Brian Lumsden	665	1.0	+1.0
Total formal votes		66,424	96.1	
Informal votes		2,683	3.9	
Turnout		69,107	95.0	
Two-party-preferred result
Liberal	Ewen Cameron	41,549	62.6	+0.3
Labor	Danny Walsh	24,860	37.4	−0.3
Liberal hold		Swing	+0.3	

==== 1984 ====
1984 Australian federal election: Indi
Party	Candidate	Votes	%	±%
Labor	Joe Murphy	21,349	34.3	−1.7
Liberal	Ewen Cameron	20,691	33.3	−8.1
National	Bill Baxter	17,602	28.3	+9.2
Democrats	Geoffrey le Couteur	1,797	2.9	−0.6
Democratic Labor	Paul Carroll	780	1.3	+1.3
Total formal votes		62,219	94.4	
Informal votes		3,684	5.6	
Turnout		65,903	95.2	
Two-party-preferred result
Liberal	Ewen Cameron	38,733	62.3	+1.6
Labor	Joe Murphy	23,468	37.7	−1.6
Liberal hold		Swing	+1.6	

==== 1983 ====
1983 Australian federal election: Indi
Party	Candidate	Votes	%	±%
Liberal	Ewen Cameron	27,935	41.3	−0.5
Labor	Carole Marple	24,374	36.1	+3.0
National	Kevin Sanderson	12,892	19.1	−0.4
Democrats	Geoffrey le Couteur	2,361	3.5	−0.7
Total formal votes		67,562	98.4	
Informal votes		1,066	1.6	
Turnout		68,628	96.5	
Two-party-preferred result
Liberal	Ewen Cameron	40,975	60.6	−1.8
Labor	Carole Marple	26,587	39.4	+1.8
Liberal hold		Swing	−1.8	

==== 1980 ====
1980 Australian federal election: Indi
Party	Candidate	Votes	%	±%
Liberal	Ewen Cameron	26,745	41.8	+15.6
Labor	Carole Marple	21,190	33.1	+7.9
National Country	Allan Garrett	12,486	19.5	−16.4
Democrats	Ralph Fleming	2,695	4.2	−2.9
Independent	Patrick Flanagan	581	0.9	+0.9
Independent	Brian Lumsden	334	0.5	+0.5
Total formal votes		64,031	97.0	
Informal votes		1,972	3.0	
Turnout		66,003	95.9	
Two-party-preferred result
Liberal	Ewen Cameron	39,947	62.4	+7.3
Labor	Carole Marple	24,084	37.6	+37.6
Liberal hold		Swing	+7.3	

=== Elections in the 1970s ===
==== 1977 ====
1977 Australian federal election: Indi
Party	Candidate	Votes	%	±%
National Country	Mac Holten	21,832	35.9	−25.6
Liberal	Ewen Cameron	15,924	26.2	+26.2
Labor	John Dennis	15,316	25.2	−0.7
Democrats	Neil Savage	4,333	7.1	+7.1
Democratic Labor	Christopher Cody	3,407	5.6	−0.7
Total formal votes		60,812	97.1	
Informal votes		1,784	2.9	
Turnout		62,596	96.2	
Two-party-preferred result
Liberal	Ewen Cameron	33,483	55.1	+55.1
National Country	Mac Holten	27,329	44.9	−22.3
Liberal gain from National Country		Swing	+22.3	

==== 1975 ====
1975 Australian federal election: Indi
Party	Candidate	Votes	%	±%
National Country	Mac Holten	33,171	61.5	+5.2
Labor	Alan Bell	17,359	32.2	−4.3
Democratic Labor	Christopher Cody	3,389	6.3	+0.6
Total formal votes		53,919	98.3	
Informal votes		922	1.7	
Turnout		54,841	96.8	
Two-party-preferred result
National Country	Mac Holten		67.2	+5.0
Labor	Alan Bell		32.8	−5.0
National Country hold		Swing	+5.0	

==== 1974 ====
1974 Australian federal election: Indi
Party	Candidate	Votes	%	±%
Country	Mac Holten	29,150	56.3	+4.7
Labor	Alan Bell	18,886	36.5	+0.4
Democratic Labor	Christopher Cody	2,958	5.7	−4.1
Australia	Jim Dimo	796	1.5	+1.5
Total formal votes		51,790	98.2	
Informal votes		928	1.8	
Turnout		52,718	96.2	
Two-party-preferred result
Country	Mac Holten		62.2	+1.4
Labor	Alan Bell		37.8	−1.4
Country hold		Swing	+1.4	

==== 1972 ====
1972 Australian federal election: Indi
Party	Candidate	Votes	%	±%
Country	Mac Holten	23,872	51.6	+4.6
Labor	John Hodgson	16,699	36.1	+7.6
Democratic Labor	Christopher Cody	4,556	9.8	−2.5
Independent	Ronald Gray	598	1.3	+1.3
Independent	Geoffrey Ryan	576	1.2	+1.2
Total formal votes		46,301	97.9	
Informal votes		1,005	2.1	
Turnout		47,306	96.7	
Two-party-preferred result
Country	Mac Holten		60.8	−7.9
Labor	John Hodgson		39.2	+7.9
Country hold		Swing	−7.9	

=== Elections in the 1960s ===
==== 1969 ====
1969 Australian federal election: Indi
Party	Candidate	Votes	%	±%
Country	Mac Holten	20,730	47.0	−3.2
Labor	Robert Cross	12,590	28.5	+6.9
Democratic Labor	Christopher Cody	5,411	12.3	−0.7
Liberal	Roy Harle	5,382	12.2	−3.2
Total formal votes		44,113	97.2	
Informal votes		1,275	2.8	
Turnout		45,388	96.4	
Two-party-preferred result
Country	Mac Holten		68.7	−7.0
Labor	Robert Cross		31.3	+7.0
Country hold		Swing	−7.0	

==== 1966 ====
1966 Australian federal election: Indi
Party	Candidate	Votes	%	±%
Country	Mac Holten	22,146	51.2	+3.2
Labor	William O'Neill	8,895	20.6	−5.1
Liberal	James Stewart	6,571	15.2	+0.9
Democratic Labor	Christopher Cody	5,614	13.0	+0.9
Total formal votes		43,226	97.1	
Informal votes		1,279	2.9	
Turnout		44,505	96.4	
Two-party-preferred result
Country	Mac Holten		76.7	+4.7
Labor	William O'Neill		23.3	−4.7
Country hold		Swing	+4.7	

==== 1963 ====
1963 Australian federal election: Indi
Party	Candidate	Votes	%	±%
Country	Mac Holten	20,551	48.0	+3.6
Labor	Mervyn Huggins	10,997	25.7	+0.4
Liberal	Ian Foyster	6,111	14.3	−4.6
Democratic Labor	Christopher Cody	5,165	12.1	+0.7
Total formal votes		42,824	98.8	
Informal votes		511	1.2	
Turnout		43,335	96.9	
Two-party-preferred result
Country	Mac Holten		72.0	+17.9
Labor	Mervyn Huggins		28.0	+28.0
Country hold		Swing	+17.9	

==== 1961 ====
1961 Australian federal election: Indi
Party	Candidate	Votes	%	±%
Country	Mac Holten	18,654	44.4	+13.5
Labor	Mervyn Huggins	10,637	25.3	−2.1
Liberal	Malcolm Cameron	7,962	18.9	−11.7
Democratic Labor	George Taylor	4,795	11.4	−2.1
Total formal votes		42,048	98.3	
Informal votes		713	1.7	
Turnout		42,761	96.1	
Two-party-preferred result
Country	Mac Holten	22,753	54.1	−2.4
Liberal	Malcolm Cameron	19,295	45.9	+2.4
Country hold		Swing	−2.4	

=== Elections in the 1950s ===
==== 1958 ====
1958 Australian federal election: Indi
Party	Candidate	Votes	%	±%
Country	Mac Holten	12,420	30.9	+30.9
Liberal	William Bostock	12,322	30.6	−29.0
Labor	John McLaren	9,758	24.2	−0.6
Democratic Labor	Henry Richards	5,416	13.5	−2.1
Independent	James Ellis	324	0.8	+0.8
Total formal votes		40,240	97.3	
Informal votes		1,128	2.7	
Turnout		41,368	95.5	
Two-party-preferred result
Country	Mac Holten	22,736	56.5	+56.5
Liberal	William Bostock	17,505	43.5	−28.6
Country gain from Liberal		Swing	+28.6	

==== 1955 ====
1955 Australian federal election: Indi
Party	Candidate	Votes	%	±%
Liberal	William Bostock	23,567	59.6	+14.6
Labor	Carl Reeves	9,815	24.8	−13.4
Labor (A-C)	William Findlay	6,179	15.6	+15.6
Total formal votes		39,561	98.2	
Informal votes		741	1.8	
Turnout		40,302	94.8	
Two-party-preferred result
Liberal	William Bostock		72.1	+10.3
Labor	Carl Reeves		27.9	−10.3
Liberal hold		Swing	+10.3	

==== 1954 ====
1954 Australian federal election: Indi
Party	Candidate	Votes	%	±%
Liberal	William Bostock	17,199	44.3	−14.3
Labor	Carl Reeves	14,423	37.1	−4.3
Country	Cyril Davy	7,231	18.6	+18.6
Total formal votes		38,853	99.3	
Informal votes		291	0.7	
Turnout		39,144	95.2	
Two-party-preferred result
Liberal	William Bostock	23,492	60.5	+1.9
Labor	Carl Reeves	15,361	39.5	−1.9
Liberal hold		Swing	+1.9	

==== 1951 ====
1951 Australian federal election: Indi
Party	Candidate	Votes	%	±%
Liberal	William Bostock	22,137	58.6	+25.3
Labor	Charles Edmondson	15,623	41.4	+4.7
Total formal votes		37,760	98.8	
Informal votes		445	1.2	
Turnout		38,205	95.5	
Liberal hold		Swing	−1.1	

=== Elections in the 1940s ===
==== 1949 ====
1949 Australian federal election: Indi
Party	Candidate	Votes	%	±%
Labor	Charles Edmondson	13,626	36.7	+1.9
Liberal	William Bostock	12,377	33.3	+33.3
Country	Clive Nason	11,157	30.0	−35.2
Total formal votes		37,160	98.9	
Informal votes		412	1.1	
Turnout		37,572	96.7	
Two-party-preferred result
Liberal	William Bostock	22,182	59.7	+59.7
Labor	Charles Edmondson	14,978	40.3	+40.3
Liberal gain from Country		Swing	+59.7	

==== 1946 ====
1946 Australian federal election: Indi
Party	Candidate	Votes	%	±%
Country	John McEwen	33,634	65.9	+7.1
Independent Country	John Chanter	17,406	34.1	+34.1
Total formal votes		51,040	98.1	
Informal votes		1,005	1.9	
Turnout		52,045	92.9	
Country hold		Swing	+6.7	

==== 1943 ====
1943 Australian federal election: Indi
Party	Candidate	Votes	%	±%
Country	John McEwen	29,471	58.8	−2.7
Labor	Charles Sandford	18,767	37.4	−1.1
Communist	Gerry O'Day	1,919	3.8	+3.8
Total formal votes		50,157	98.8	
Informal votes		599	1.2	
Turnout		50,756	96.0	
Two-party-preferred result
Country	John McEwen		59.2	−2.3
Labor	Charles Sandford		40.8	+2.3
Country hold		Swing	−2.3	

==== 1940 ====
1940 Australian federal election: Indi
Party	Candidate	Votes	%	±%
Country	John McEwen	30,676	61.5	+0.3
Labor	Jack Devlin	19,216	38.5	−0.3
Total formal votes		49,892	98.8	
Informal votes		608	1.2	
Turnout		50,500	95.2	
Country hold		Swing	+0.3	

=== Elections in the 1930s ===
==== 1937 ====
1937 Australian federal election: Indi
Party	Candidate	Votes	%	±%
Country	John McEwen	30,660	61.2	+13.2
Labor	William Hartshorne	19,478	38.8	+3.3
Total formal votes		50,138	98.6	
Informal votes		699	1.4	
Turnout		50,837	96.7	
Country hold		Swing	−1.7	

==== 1934 ====
1934 Australian federal election: Indi
Party	Candidate	Votes	%	±%
Labor	Paul Jones	17,430	40.8	+5.6
United Australia	William Hutchinson	16,400	38.4	−6.6
Country	Vernon Davies	8,894	20.8	+0.9
Total formal votes		42,724	98.0	
Informal votes		893	2.0	
Turnout		43,617	94.7	
Two-party-preferred result
United Australia	William Hutchinson	24,033	56.3	−6.7
Labor	Paul Jones	18,691	43.7	+6.7
United Australia hold		Swing	−6.7	

==== 1931 ====
1931 Australian federal election: Indi
Party	Candidate	Votes	%	±%
United Australia	William Hutchinson	18,149	45.0	+39.4
Labor	Paul Jones	14,190	35.2	−14.2
Country	Arthur Walter	8,011	19.9	−25.2
Total formal votes		40,350	98.2	
Informal votes		721	1.8	
Turnout		41,071	95.1	
Two-party-preferred result
United Australia	William Hutchinson	25,405	63.0	+63.0
Labor	Paul Jones	14,945	37.0	−14.4
United Australia gain from Labor		Swing	+14.4	

=== Elections in the 1920s ===
==== 1929 ====
1929 Australian federal election: Indi
Party	Candidate	Votes	%	±%
Labor	Paul Jones	19,319	49.4	−50.6
Country	Robert Cook	11,493	29.4	+29.4
Country	Arthur Walter	6,124	15.7	+15.7
Country	Leslie Sambell	2,180	5.6	+5.6
Total formal votes		39,116	98.2	
Informal votes		721	1.8	
Turnout		39,837	96.0	
Two-party-preferred result
Labor	Paul Jones	20,110	51.4	−48.6
Country	Robert Cook	19,006	48.6	+48.6
Labor hold		Swing	−48.6	

==== 1928 ====
1928 Australian federal election: Indi
Party	Candidate	Votes	%	±%
Labor	Paul Jones	unopposed		
Labor gain from Country		Swing		

==== 1925 ====
1925 Australian federal election: Indi
Party	Candidate	Votes	%	±%
Country	Robert Cook	21,161	56.7	+17.4
Labor	David Black	16,153	43.3	+8.3
Total formal votes		37,314	98.5	
Informal votes		550	1.5	
Turnout		37,864	93.7	
Country hold		Swing	−6.5	

==== 1922 ====
1922 Australian federal election: Indi
Party	Candidate	Votes	%	±%
Country	Robert Cook	8,723	39.3	+9.6
Labor	John Minogue	7,768	35.0	+1.9
Nationalist	Donald Mackinnon	5,695	25.7	−11.5
Total formal votes		22,186	96.8	
Informal votes		705	3.2	
Turnout		22,891	58.8	
Two-party-preferred result
Country	Robert Cook	14,027	63.2	−0.8
Labor	John Minogue	8,159	36.8	+0.8
Country hold		Swing	−0.8	

=== Elections in the 1910s ===
==== 1919 ====
1919 Australian federal election: Indi
Party	Candidate	Votes	%	±%
Labor	Joseph Hanigan	8,668	36.4	−7.4
Victorian Farmers	Robert Cook	7,673	32.2	+32.2
Nationalist	John Leckie	7,492	31.4	−24.8
Total formal votes		23,833	96.4	
Informal votes		889	3.6	
Turnout		24,722	78.0	
Two-party-preferred result
Victorian Farmers	Robert Cook	14,922	62.6	+62.6
Labor	Joseph Hanigan	8,911	37.4	−6.4
Victorian Farmers gain from Nationalist		Swing	+6.4	

==== 1917 ====
1917 Australian federal election: Indi
Party	Candidate	Votes	%	±%
Nationalist	John Leckie	16,216	56.2	+7.2
Labor	Parker Moloney	12,639	43.8	−7.2
Total formal votes		28,855	98.6	
Informal votes		422	1.4	
Turnout		29,277	89.5	
Nationalist gain from Labor		Swing	+7.2	

==== 1914 ====
1914 Australian federal election: Indi
Party	Candidate	Votes	%	±%
Labor	Parker Moloney	15,519	51.0	+3.1
Liberal	Cornelius Ahern	14,900	49.0	−2.8
Total formal votes		30,419	99.3	
Informal votes		217	0.7	
Turnout		30,636	86.9	
Labor gain from Liberal		Swing	+3.0	

==== 1913 ====
1913 Australian federal election: Indi
Party	Candidate	Votes	%	±%
Liberal	Cornelius Ahern	14,759	51.8	+6.5
Labor	Parker Moloney	13,653	47.9	+0.2
Independent	Joseph Brown	67	0.2	+0.2
Total formal votes		28,479	97.9	
Informal votes		609	2.1	
Turnout		29,088	80.1	
Liberal gain from Labor		Swing	+3.2	

==== 1910 ====
1910 Australian federal election: Indi
Party	Candidate	Votes	%	±%
Labour	Parker Moloney	10,900	53.1	+14.1
Liberal	Joseph Brown	9,633	46.9	−14.1
Total formal votes		20,533	98.4	
Informal votes		332	1.6	
Turnout		20,865	68.7	
Labour gain from Liberal		Swing	+7.2	

=== Elections in the 1900s ===
==== 1906 ====
1906 Australian federal election: Indi
Party	Candidate	Votes	%	±%
Anti-Socialist	Joseph Brown	6,801	44.4	+44.4
Labour	Daniel Turnbull	5,986	39.0	+39.0
Protectionist	Thomas McInerney	2,546	16.6	+16.6
Total formal votes		15,333	94.6	
Informal votes		872	5.4	
Turnout		16,205	55.0	
Anti-Socialist gain from Protectionist		Swing	+44.4	

==== 1903 ====
1903 Australian federal election: Indi
Party	Candidate	Votes	%	±%
Protectionist	Isaac Isaacs	unopposed		
Protectionist hold		Swing		

==== 1901 ====
1901 Australian federal election: Indi
Party	Candidate	Votes	%	±%
Protectionist	Isaac Isaacs	3,839	65.1	+65.1
Free Trade	Thomas Ashworth	2,058	34.9	+34.9
Total formal votes		5,897	99.1	
Informal votes		52	0.9	
Turnout		5,949	59.4	
Protectionist win		(new seat)		
