= Electoral results for the Division of Deakin =

Australian division election results

This is a list of electoral results for the Division of Deakin in Australian federal elections from the division's creation in 1937 until the present.

== Members ==
Member	Party	Term
William Hutchinson	United Australia	1937–1945
William Hutchinson	Liberal	1945–1949
Frank Davis	Liberal	1949–1966
Alan Jarman	Liberal	1966–1983
John Saunderson	Labor	1983–1984
Julian Beale	Liberal	1984–1990
Ken Aldred	Liberal	1990–1996
Phil Barresi	Liberal	1996–2007
Mike Symon	Labor	2007–2013
Michael Sukkar	Liberal	2013–2025
Matt Gregg	Labor	2025–present

== Election results ==
=== Elections in the 2020s ===
==== 2025 ====
2025 Australian federal election: Deakin
Party	Candidate	Votes	%	±%
Liberal	Michael Sukkar	44,732	38.72	−2.78
Labor	Matt Gregg	40,177	34.78	+1.87
Greens	Amy Mills	13,766	11.92	−2.28
Independent	Jess Ness	8,259	7.15	+7.15
One Nation	Anne Cooke	3,043	2.63	+0.39
Family First	Richard Griffith-Jones	2,105	1.82	+1.82
Trumpet of Patriots	Milton Wilde	1,853	1.60	+0.69
Libertarian	Will Vandermeer	1,585	1.37	+1.37
Total formal votes		115,520	96.11	+0.09
Informal votes		4,679	3.89	−0.09
Turnout		120,199	94.83	+2.37
Two-party-preferred result
Labor	Matt Gregg	60,970	52.78	+2.80
Liberal	Michael Sukkar	54,550	47.22	−2.80
Labor gain from Liberal		Swing	+2.80	

Results are not final. Last updated on 24 May 2025 at 1:00 AM AEST.

==== 2022 ====
2022 Australian federal election: Deakin
Party	Candidate	Votes	%	±%
Liberal	Michael Sukkar	41,626	41.51	−6.21
Labor	Matt Gregg	32,844	32.76	+0.40
Greens	Rob Humphreys	13,904	13.87	+4.58
United Australia	Bianca Gidley	2,836	2.83	+0.76
One Nation	Natasha Coughlan	2,306	2.30	+2.30
Liberal Democrats	Harrison Carr	1,843	1.84	+1.84
Animal Justice	Katherine Dolheguy	1,650	1.65	−0.31
Independent	Qian Liu	1,271	1.27	+1.27
Justice	Judith Thompson	1,080	1.08	−2.23
Federation	Samantha Bastin	909	0.91	+0.91
Total formal votes		100,269	95.78	−0.15
Informal votes		4,419	4.22	+0.15
Turnout		104,688	93.09	−2.08
Two-party-preferred result
Liberal	Michael Sukkar	50,322	50.19	−4.50
Labor	Matt Gregg	49,947	49.81	+4.50
Liberal hold		Swing	−4.50	

Alluvial diagram for preference flows in the seat of Deakin in the 2022 federal election. indicates at what stage the winning candidate had over 50% of the votes and was declared the winner.

=== Elections in the 2010s ===
==== 2019 ====
2019 Australian federal election: Deakin
Party	Candidate	Votes	%	±%
Liberal	Michael Sukkar	46,536	47.84	−2.47
Labor	Shireen Morris	31,648	32.54	+2.46
Greens	Sophia Sun	8,730	8.98	−2.37
Justice	Ellie Sullivan	3,386	3.48	+3.48
United Australia	Milton Wilde	1,997	2.05	+2.05
Animal Justice	Vinita Costantino	1,964	2.02	−0.96
Independent	Vickie Janson	1,614	1.66	+1.66
Democratic Labour	Joel van der Horst	1,394	1.43	+1.43
Total formal votes		97,269	95.90	−1.09
Informal votes		4,155	4.10	+1.09
Turnout		101,424	94.35	−0.64
Two-party-preferred result
Liberal	Michael Sukkar	53,288	54.78	−1.66
Labor	Shireen Morris	43,981	45.22	+1.66
Liberal hold		Swing	−1.66	

==== 2016 ====
2016 Australian federal election: Deakin
Party	Candidate	Votes	%	±%
Liberal	Michael Sukkar	45,161	50.03	+4.15
Labor	Tony Clark	28,021	31.04	−1.69
Greens	Joshua Briers	10,587	11.73	+0.90
Animal Justice	Vanessa Browne	2,394	2.65	+2.65
Christians	Karen Dobby	2,096	2.32	+0.40
Family First	Gary Coombes	2,009	2.23	+0.87
Total formal votes		90,268	97.34	+1.67
Informal votes		2,471	2.66	−1.67
Turnout		92,739	93.02	−1.69
Two-party-preferred result
Liberal	Michael Sukkar	50,264	55.68	+2.50
Labor	Tony Clark	40,004	44.32	−2.50
Liberal hold		Swing	+2.50	

==== 2013 ====
2013 Australian federal election: Deakin
Party	Candidate	Votes	%	±%
Liberal	Michael Sukkar	40,482	45.88	+2.01
Labor	Mike Symon	28,883	32.73	−5.65
Greens	Brendan Powell	9,560	10.83	−1.93
Palmer United	Mario Guardiani	1,949	2.21	+2.21
Sex Party	Stephen Barber	1,856	2.10	+2.10
Christians	Ian Dobby	1,698	1.92	+1.92
Independent	Mike Barclay	1,519	1.72	+1.72
Family First	Hannah Westbrook	1,200	1.36	−2.14
Rise Up Australia	Yasmin De Zilwa	327	0.37	+0.37
Katter's Australian	Steve Raskovy	293	0.33	+0.33
Country Alliance	Toni Smith	261	0.30	+0.30
Australia First	John Carbonari	212	0.24	−0.04
Total formal votes		88,240	95.67	−0.80
Informal votes		3,989	4.33	+0.80
Turnout		92,229	94.76	0.00
Two-party-preferred result
Liberal	Michael Sukkar	46,926	53.18	+3.78
Labor	Mike Symon	41,314	46.82	−3.78
Liberal gain from Labor		Swing	+3.78	

==== 2010 ====
2010 Australian federal election: Deakin
Party	Candidate	Votes	%	±%
Liberal	Phil Barresi	33,553	41.94	−2.41
Labor	Mike Symon	31,941	39.93	−1.93
Greens	David Howell	10,338	12.92	+4.44
Family First	Peter Lake	2,532	3.17	+0.02
Independent	Abraham Seviloglou	836	1.05	+1.05
Liberal Democrats	Benjamin Walsh	505	0.63	−0.08
Australia First	Alex Norwick	295	0.37	+0.37
Total formal votes		80,000	96.42	−1.49
Informal votes		2,967	3.58	+1.49
Turnout		82,967	94.56	−1.33
Two-party-preferred result
Labor	Mike Symon	41,927	52.41	+1.00
Liberal	Phil Barresi	38,073	47.59	−1.00
Labor hold		Swing	+1.00	

=== Elections in the 2000s ===
==== 2007 ====
2007 Australian federal election: Deakin
Party	Candidate	Votes	%	±%
Liberal	Phil Barresi	36,501	44.35	−6.24
Labor	Mike Symon	34,451	41.86	+5.71
Greens	Bill Pemberton	6,978	8.48	+0.62
Family First	Fiona Bronte	2,589	3.15	+0.81
Democrats	Paul Nicholson	1,205	1.46	−0.51
Liberty & Democracy	Nick Stevenson	586	0.71	+0.71
Total formal votes		82,310	97.91	+0.97
Informal votes		1,756	2.09	−0.97
Turnout		84,066	95.84	+0.41
Two-party-preferred result
Labor	Mike Symon	42,319	51.41	+6.38
Liberal	Phil Barresi	39,991	48.59	−6.38
Labor gain from Liberal		Swing	+6.38	

==== 2004 ====
2004 Australian federal election: Deakin
Party	Candidate	Votes	%	±%
Liberal	Phil Barresi	40,922	50.59	+3.52
Labor	Peter Lynch	29,240	36.15	−2.40
Greens	Bill Pemberton	6,359	7.86	+1.56
Family First	Yasmin de Zilwa	1,889	2.34	+2.34
Democrats	Alan Bailey	1,595	1.97	−5.98
Independent	Steve Raskovy	739	0.91	+0.91
Citizens Electoral Council	Simon Tait	140	0.17	+0.14
Total formal votes		80,884	96.94	−0.48
Informal votes		2,554	3.06	+0.48
Turnout		83,438	95.43	−0.05
Two-party-preferred result
Liberal	Phil Barresi	44,462	54.97	+3.37
Labor	Peter Lynch	36,422	45.03	−3.37
Liberal hold		Swing	+3.37	

==== 2001 ====
2001 Australian federal election: Deakin
Party	Candidate	Votes	%	±%
Liberal	Phil Barresi	37,417	47.26	+3.31
Labor	Helen Buckingham	30,397	38.39	−0.44
Democrats	Nahum Ayliffe	6,317	7.98	+0.00
Greens	Robyn Evans	5,045	6.37	+3.88
Total formal votes		79,176	97.44	+0.62
Informal votes		2,082	2.56	−0.62
Turnout		81,258	95.62	
Two-party-preferred result
Liberal	Phil Barresi	40,962	51.74	−0.19
Labor	Helen Buckingham	38,214	48.26	+0.19
Liberal hold		Swing	−0.19	

=== Elections in the 1990s ===
==== 1998 ====
1998 Australian federal election: Deakin
Party	Candidate	Votes	%	±%
Liberal	Phil Barresi	34,047	43.95	−0.77
Labor	Peter Bertolus	30,079	38.83	+0.17
Democrats	John Siddons	6,177	7.97	−0.90
One Nation	Paul Coelli	2,232	2.88	+2.88
Greens	Robyn Evans	1,929	2.49	+0.05
	Tim Petherbridge	1,486	1.92	+1.92
Unity	Geoffrey Teng	1,289	1.66	+1.66
Natural Law	Linda Keath	230	0.30	−0.66
Total formal votes		77,469	96.81	−0.32
Informal votes		2,549	3.19	+0.32
Turnout		80,018	96.05	−0.61
Two-party-preferred result
Liberal	Phil Barresi	40,233	51.93	−0.55
Labor	Peter Bertolus	37,236	48.07	+0.55
Liberal hold		Swing	−0.55	

==== 1996 ====
1996 Australian federal election: Deakin
Party	Candidate	Votes	%	±%
Liberal	Phil Barresi	34,292	44.72	−2.63
Labor	Kerrin Buckney	29,639	38.65	−4.99
Democrats	John Siddons	6,801	8.87	+3.87
Greens	Kathy Lothian	1,870	2.44	+2.44
Call to Australia	Murray Graham	1,495	1.95	+0.56
AAFI	Paul Coelli	1,226	1.60	+1.60
Natural Law	Maggie Lawrence	730	0.95	−0.53
Independent	David White	429	0.56	+0.56
Independent	Gilbert Boffa	194	0.25	+0.25
Total formal votes		76,676	97.13	−0.20
Informal votes		2,262	2.87	+0.20
Turnout		78,938	96.65	+0.20
Two-party-preferred result
Liberal	Phil Barresi	40,027	52.48	+1.89
Labor	Kerrin Buckney	36,244	47.52	−1.89
Liberal hold		Swing	+1.89	

==== 1993 ====
1993 Australian federal election: Deakin
Party	Candidate	Votes	%	±%
Liberal	Ken Aldred	34,123	47.40	+2.70
Labor	Greg Adkins	31,073	43.16	+8.86
Democrats	Peter Magart	3,519	4.89	−11.80
Call to Australia	Alan Barron	1,227	1.70	−2.01
Natural Law	Robert Nieuwenhuis	1,060	1.47	+1.47
	William Backhouse	987	1.37	+1.37
Total formal votes		71,989	97.37	−0.28
Informal votes		1,946	2.63	+0.28
Turnout		73,935	96.45	
Two-party-preferred result
Liberal	Ken Aldred	36,879	51.27	−1.08
Labor	Greg Adkins	35,048	48.73	+1.08
Liberal hold		Swing	−1.08	

==== 1990 ====
1990 Australian federal election: Deakin
Party	Candidate	Votes	%	±%
Liberal	Ken Aldred	31,212	44.7	−0.4
Labor	Tony Lamb	23,955	34.3	−13.2
Democrats	Louise Enders	11,652	16.7	+10.4
Call to Australia	Rodger Nardi	2,591	3.7	+3.7
Democratic Socialist	Bronwen Beechey	413	0.6	+0.6
Total formal votes		69,823	97.6	
Informal votes		1,684	2.4	
Turnout		71,507	96.6	
Two-party-preferred result
Liberal	Ken Aldred	36,505	52.4	+4.3
Labor	Tony Lamb	33,222	47.6	−4.3
Liberal gain from Labor		Swing	+4.3	

=== Elections in the 1980s ===
==== 1987 ====
1987 Australian federal election: Deakin
Party	Candidate	Votes	%	±%
Liberal	Julian Beale	30,665	48.5	+1.7
Labor	Madelyn Myatt	27,884	44.1	−1.1
Democrats	Marcus Bosch	3,992	6.3	+0.2
Unite Australia	Rick Wright	401	0.6	+0.6
Independent	Gil Speirs	267	0.4	+0.4
Total formal votes		63,209	96.0	
Informal votes		2,660	4.0	
Turnout		65,869	96.4	
Two-party-preferred result
Liberal	Julian Beale	32,569	51.5	+0.8
Labor	Madelyn Myatt	30,624	48.5	−0.8
Liberal hold		Swing	+0.8	

==== 1984 ====
1984 Australian federal election: Deakin
Party	Candidate	Votes	%	±%
Liberal	Julian Beale	28,975	46.8	+2.5
Labor	Richard Johns	27,980	45.2	−0.3
Democrats	Jeffrey McAlpine	3,774	6.1	−0.6
Democratic Labor	Peter Ferwerda	1,240	2.0	−1.7
Total formal votes		61,969	93.9	
Informal votes		4,042	6.1	
Turnout		66,011	96.1	
Two-party-preferred result
Liberal	Julian Beale	31,435	50.7	+0.0
Labor	Richard Johns	30,530	49.3	-0.0
Liberal hold		Swing	+0.0	

==== 1983 ====
1983 Australian federal election: Deakin
Party	Candidate	Votes	%	±%
Labor	John Saunderson	38,225	47.7	+6.3
Liberal	Alan Jarman	33,225	41.5	−2.2
Democrats	Jeffrey McAlpine	5,324	6.7	−5.2
Democratic Labor	Peter Ferwerda	2,949	3.7	+0.7
Independent	Wilfrid Thiele	333	0.4	+0.4
Total formal votes		81,615	96.4	
Informal votes		1,559	1.9	
Turnout		81,615	96.4	
Two-party-preferred result
Labor	John Saunderson	41,727	52.1	+4.4
Liberal	Alan Jarman	38,329	47.9	−4.4
Labor gain from Liberal		Swing	+4.4	

==== 1980 ====
1980 Australian federal election: Deakin
Party	Candidate	Votes	%	±%
Liberal	Alan Jarman	33,011	43.7	−2.4
Labor	John Madden	31,277	41.4	+9.0
Democrats	Edwin Adamson	9,014	11.9	−4.4
Democratic Labor	Peter Ferwerda	2,291	3.0	−2.2
Total formal votes		75,593	98.1	
Informal votes		1,469	1.9	
Turnout		77,062	96.3	
Two-party-preferred result
Liberal	Alan Jarman	39,561	52.3	−5.1
Labor	John Madden	36,032	47.7	+5.1
Liberal hold		Swing	−5.1	

=== Elections in the 1970s ===
==== 1977 ====
1977 Australian federal election: Deakin
Party	Candidate	Votes	%	±%
Liberal	Alan Jarman	32,378	46.1	−6.3
Labor	Neville Gay	22,730	32.4	−7.6
Democrats	Alan Teed	11,451	16.3	+16.3
Democratic Labor	Daniel Condon	3,670	5.2	+1.0
Total formal votes		70,229	97.6	
Informal votes		1,710	2.4	
Turnout		71,939	96.4	
Two-party-preferred result
Liberal	Alan Jarman	40,316	57.4	−0.4
Labor	Neville Gay	29,913	42.6	+0.4
Liberal hold		Swing	−0.4	

==== 1975 ====
1975 Australian federal election: Deakin
Party	Candidate	Votes	%	±%
Liberal	Alan Jarman	33,935	54.5	+8.0
Labor	Gavan Oakley	23,607	37.9	−6.2
Democratic Labor	Jim Brosnan	2,626	4.2	−0.4
Australia	William Inglis	1,196	1.9	−0.8
Independent	Walter Williams	928	1.5	+1.5
Total formal votes		62,292	98.5	
Informal votes		925	1.5	
Turnout		63,217	96.5	
Two-party-preferred result
Liberal	Alan Jarman		59.9	+7.6
Labor	Gavan Oakley		40.1	−7.6
Liberal hold		Swing	+7.6	

==== 1974 ====
1974 Australian federal election: Deakin
Party	Candidate	Votes	%	±%
Liberal	Alan Jarman	28,102	46.5	+4.6
Labor	Gavan Oakley	26,642	44.1	+0.2
Democratic Labor	Jim Brosnan	2,783	4.6	−2.2
Australia	Harold Jeffrey	1,627	2.7	−1.6
Independent	Bill French	967	1.6	+1.6
Independent	Stanley Lyden	279	0.5	+0.5
Total formal votes		60,400	98.4	
Informal votes		956	1.6	
Turnout		61,356	95.9	
Two-party-preferred result
Liberal	Alan Jarman	31,598	52.3	+1.6
Labor	Gavan Oakley	28,802	47.7	−1.6
Liberal hold		Swing	+1.6	

==== 1972 ====
1972 Australian federal election: Deakin
Party	Candidate	Votes	%	±%
Labor	William French	23,987	43.9	+7.9
Liberal	Alan Jarman	22,873	41.9	−5.1
Democratic Labor	Maurice Weston	3,732	6.8	−2.9
Australia	Gavan Burn	2,336	4.3	+4.3
Independent	Harold Jeffrey	1,658	3.0	+3.0
Total formal votes		54,586	98.3	
Informal votes		934	1.7	
Turnout		55,520	96.4	
Two-party-preferred result
Liberal	Alan Jarman	27,653	50.7	−7.0
Labor	William French	26,933	49.3	+7.0
Liberal hold		Swing	−7.0	

=== Elections in the 1960s ===
==== 1969 ====
1969 Australian federal election: Deakin
Party	Candidate	Votes	%	±%
Liberal	Alan Jarman	23,592	47.0	−6.0
Labor	Bernard Mildner	18,095	36.0	+4.4
Democratic Labor	Maurice Weston	4,862	9.7	−1.7
Independent	Ray Nilsen	3,658	7.3	+7.3
Total formal votes		50,207	97.8	
Informal votes		1,128	2.2	
Turnout		51,335	96.0	
Two-party-preferred result
Liberal	Alan Jarman	28,990	57.7	−8.6
Labor	Bernard Mildner	21,217	42.3	+8.6
Liberal hold		Swing	−8.6	

==== 1966 ====
1966 Australian federal election: Deakin
Party	Candidate	Votes	%	±%
Liberal	Alan Jarman	39,183	50.0	−2.0
Labor	David McKenzie	25,039	31.9	−5.4
Democratic Labor	Maurice Weston	8,915	11.4	+0.7
Liberal Reform Group	Michael Degendorfer	5,284	6.7	+6.7
Total formal votes		78,421	97.2	
Informal votes		2,258	2.8	
Turnout		80,679	95.6	
Two-party-preferred result
Liberal	Alan Jarman		63.3	+1.7
Labor	David McKenzie		46.7	−1.7
Liberal hold		Swing	+1.7	

==== 1963 ====
1963 Australian federal election: Deakin
Party	Candidate	Votes	%	±%
Liberal	Frank Davis	34,863	52.0	+4.7
Labor	Pat Hubbard	25,045	37.3	−2.4
Democratic Labor	Maurice Weston	7,184	10.7	−2.3
Total formal votes		67,092	99.0	
Informal votes		711	1.0	
Turnout		67,803	96.6	
Two-party-preferred result
Liberal	Frank Davis		61.6	+3.4
Labor	Pat Hubbard		38.4	−3.4
Liberal hold		Swing	+3.4	

==== 1961 ====
1961 Australian federal election: Deakin
Party	Candidate	Votes	%	±%
Liberal	Frank Davis	28,392	47.3	−3.1
Labor	George Slater	23,839	39.7	+4.2
Democratic Labor	Maurice Weston	7,802	13.0	−1.0
Total formal votes		60,033	98.3	
Informal votes		1,040	1.7	
Turnout		61,073	95.7	
Two-party-preferred result
Liberal	Frank Davis	34,955	58.2	−4.9
Labor	George Slater	25,078	41.8	+4.9
Liberal hold		Swing	−4.9	

=== Elections in the 1950s ===
==== 1958 ====
1958 Australian federal election: Deakin
Party	Candidate	Votes	%	±%
Liberal	Frank Davis	24,709	50.4	−2.9
Labor	Norm Griffiths	17,411	35.5	+2.4
Democratic Labor	Terence Collins	6,877	14.0	+0.4
Total formal votes		48,997	98.0	
Informal votes		987	2.0	
Turnout		49,984	95.6	
Two-party-preferred result
Liberal	Frank Davis		63.1	−1.3
Labor	Norm Griffiths		36.9	+1.3
Liberal hold		Swing	−1.3	

==== 1955 ====
1955 Australian federal election: Deakin
Party	Candidate	Votes	%	±%
Liberal	Frank Davis	21,641	53.3	+0.0
Labor	Norm Griffiths	13,422	33.1	−13.6
Labor (A-C)	Terence Collins	5,512	13.6	+13.6
Total formal votes		40,575	97.7	
Informal votes		947	2.3	
Turnout		41,522	94.5	
Two-party-preferred result
Liberal	Frank Davis		64.4	+11.1
Labor	Norm Griffiths		35.6	−11.1
Liberal hold		Swing	+11.1	

==== 1954 ====
1954 Australian federal election: Deakin
Party	Candidate	Votes	%	±%
Liberal	Frank Davis	29,886	52.2	+3.6
Labor	Gordon Bryant	27,375	47.8	+1.4
Total formal votes		57,261	99.0	
Informal votes		576	1.0	
Turnout		57,837	96.1	
Liberal hold		Swing	+0.6	

==== 1951 ====
1951 Australian federal election: Deakin
Party	Candidate	Votes	%	±%
Liberal	Frank Davis	22,946	48.6	−7.0
Labor	Gordon Bryant	21,908	46.4	+2.0
Independent	Eric Butler	2,364	5.0	+5.0
Total formal votes		47,218	98.7	
Informal votes		617	1.3	
Turnout		47,835	95.3	
Two-party-preferred result
Liberal	Frank Davis	24,347	51.6	−4.0
Labor	Gordon Bryant	22,871	48.4	+4.0
Liberal hold		Swing	−4.0	

=== Elections in the 1940s ===
==== 1949 ====
1949 Australian federal election: Deakin
Party	Candidate	Votes	%	±%
Liberal	Frank Davis	23,517	55.6	+0.5
Labor	Rod Leeson	18,784	44.4	−0.5
Total formal votes		42,301	98.7	
Informal votes		575	1.3	
Turnout		42,876	94.7	
Liberal hold		Swing	+0.5	

==== 1946 ====
1946 Australian federal election: Deakin
Party	Candidate	Votes	%	±%
Liberal	William Hutchinson	36,262	56.7	+24.0
Labor	Arthur Smith	27,710	43.3	+5.6
Total formal votes		63,972	98.5	
Informal votes		1,002	1.5	
Turnout		64,974	93.7	
Liberal hold		Swing	+0.0	

==== 1943 ====
1943 Australian federal election: Deakin
Party	Candidate	Votes	%	±%
Labor	Frank Williamson	22,356	37.7	+5.4
United Australia	William Hutchinson	19,375	32.7	−22.1
Independent	Robert Elliott	10,318	17.4	+17.4
Middle Class	Alan Coffey	4,185	7.1	+7.1
Ind. United Australia	Dick Radclyffe	1,526	2.6	+2.6
Independent	Arthur Coles	1,471	2.5	+2.5
Total formal votes		59,231	97.1	
Informal votes		1,760	2.9	
Turnout		60,991	96.4	
Two-party-preferred result
United Australia	William Hutchinson	33,577	56.7	−5.5
Labor	Frank Williamson	25,654	43.3	+5.5
United Australia hold		Swing	−5.5	

==== 1940 ====
1940 Australian federal election: Deakin
Party	Candidate	Votes	%	±%
United Australia	William Hutchinson	29,318	54.8	−4.9
Labor	Frank Williamson	17,267	32.3	−8.0
Independent	Frank Fisher	3,983	7.4	+7.4
Independent	Dunean McCallum	2,969	5.5	+5.5
Total formal votes		53,537	98.3	
Informal votes		911	1.7	
Turnout		54,448	95.0	
Two-party-preferred result
United Australia	William Hutchinson		62.2	+2.5
Labor	Frank Williamson		37.8	−2.5
United Australia hold		Swing	+2.5	

=== Elections in the 1930s ===
==== 1937 ====
1937 Australian federal election: Deakin
Party	Candidate	Votes	%	±%
United Australia	William Hutchinson	30,442	59.7	+5.5
Labor	Paul Jones	20,512	40.3	+9.5
Total formal votes		50,954	98.2	
Informal votes		911	1.8	
Turnout		51,865	95.8	
United Australia notional hold		Swing	−6.7	
