= Henry Beardmore =

Australian politician

Henry Beardmore (7 February 1863 – 29 August 1932) was an Australian politician.

Beardmore was born in Melton to butcher Edwin James Beardmore and Flora McDonald. He grew up in Benalla and became a butcher at Glenrowan before becoming a farmer near Wodonga. On 15 July 1885 he married Agnes Annie Lee, with whom he had four children; she died in 1892, and on 23 August 1893 he married Jessie Muirhead, with whom he had a further ten children. He served on Wodonga Shire Council from 1898 to 1922, with four terms as president (1900–01, 1908–10, 1911–12, 1914–17).

In 1917 Beardmore won a by-election for the Victorian Legislative Assembly seat of Benambra; he was associated with the Economy Party and more broadly with the Nationalists. From 19 March 1924 to 18 July 1924 he was a minister without portfolio, a position he held again from 18 June 1929 to 10 December 1929. He was Minister of Railways, Electrical Undertakings and Labour for two days in December 1929. Beardmore remained in the Assembly until his death in Wodonga in 1932.

Victorian Legislative Assembly
Preceded by John Leckie	Member for Benambra; 1917–1932	Succeeded by Roy Paton
