= Robert Cook (Australian politician) =

Australian politician

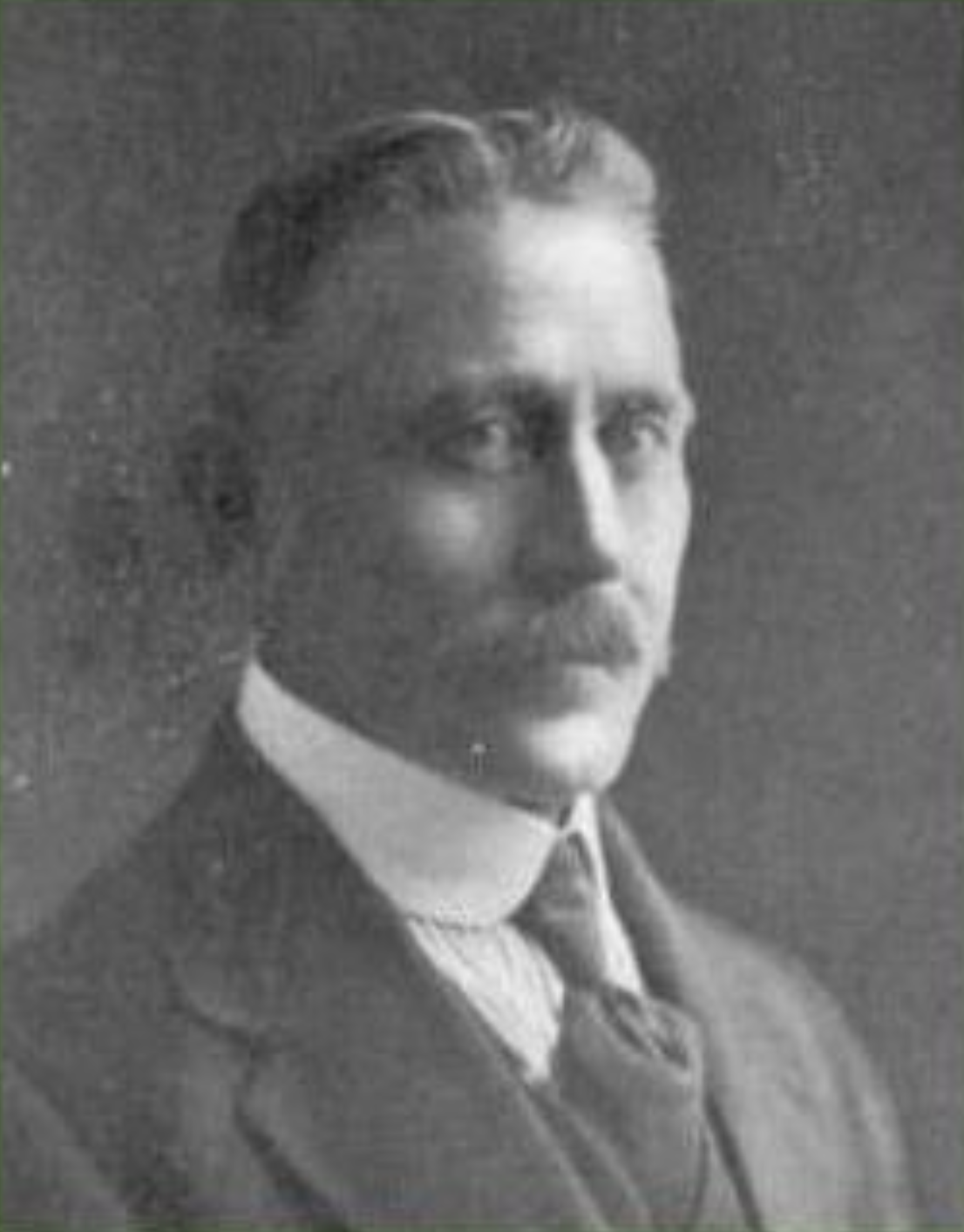

Member of the Australian Parliament for Indi
- In office 13 December 1919 – 9 October 1928
- Preceded by: John Leckie
- Succeeded by: Paul Jones

Personal details
- Born: 18 April 1867 Chiltern, Victoria
- Died: 21 May 1930 (aged 63) Melbourne, Victoria
- Party: Australian Country Party
- Spouse: Sarah Anne Weston
- Occupation: Dairy farmer

Robert Cook (18 April 1867 – 21 May 1930) was an Australian politician. He was a Country Party member of the Australian House of Representatives from 1919 to 1928, representing the Victorian electorate of Indi.

== Early life ==
Cook was born at Chiltern, Victoria to English splitter Henry Cook and his Irish wife Mary, née Wilkinson. He received little formal education and was soon a land-owner, owning land at Tallangatta and Porepunkah. He married Sarah Anne Weston on 24 December 1894 at Porepunkah; in 1905, they moved to Oxley and established a dairy farm.

== Local politics ==
Cook was a member of Chiltern Shire Council 1902–04, and was elected to the Shire of Oxley Council in 1908, being its president 1910-11 and 1916–17. He became one of the most active public figures in the Wangaratta district, founding the North-Eastern Co-operative Society Ltd in 1906. He was also a director of the Milawa Dairy Co and chairman of the Butter and Chesse Factories Association of Victoria, and held membership of the Victorian Dairy Council, the Western and Murray Co-operative Bacon and Meat Packing Co, the Wangaratta Agricultural Society, and the Melbourne Chamber of Agriculture.

== Federal politics ==
In 1919, Cook stood for the Australian House of Representatives as a candidate for the Victorian Farmers Union in Indi, and defeated sitting Nationalist member John Leckie. The following year, Cook joined several other rural MPs in forming the Country Party. Cook was handily returned under the Country banner in 1922 and 1925. However, in 1928, he mistakenly failed to lodge his renomination papers, resulting in Labor challenger Paul Jones taking the seat unopposed. He tried to regain the seat in 1929, but narrowly lost to Jones.

Cook's health deteriorated until he died in Melbourne on 21 May 1930, survived by three daughters and two sons. His wife Sarah had died on 26 June 1927. Cook was buried at the local cemetery at Milawa.

Parliament of Australia
Preceded by John Leckie	Member for Indi; 1919 – 1928	Succeeded by Paul Jones
