= Lou Lieberman =

Australian politician (1938–2024)

The Honourable Lou Lieberman AM

Member of the Australian Parliament for Indi
- In office 13 March 1993 – 8 October 2001
- Preceded by: Ewen Cameron
- Succeeded by: Sophie Mirabella

Member of the Victorian Parliament for Benambra
- In office March 1976 – August 1992
- Preceded by: Tom Mitchell
- Succeeded by: Tony Plowman

Personal details
- Born: Louis Stuart Lieberman; 23 May 1938 Swan Hill, Victoria
- Died: 17 May 2024 (aged 85)
- Party: Liberal Party
- Spouse: Marjorie Cox
- Children: 2 sons, 1 daughter
- Occupation: Barrister

Louis Stuart Lieberman AM (23 May 1938 – 17 May 2024) was an Australian politician and was a member of both the Victorian Legislative Assembly and the Australian House of Representatives.

Born on 23 May 1938 at Swan Hill, Lou Lieberman was educated at Albury High School. He studied law while working as a law clerk at Tietyens Angel & Jackling and on becoming a barrister in 1961 became a partner. He bought the Wodonga practice and merged it with J. S. N. Harris in 1966. In 1978 he became a founding partner in the Wodonga law firm of Harris Lieberman Boyd. He also did National Service and served in 8/13 VMR (Victorian Mounted Rifles) working with Centurion tanks.

He served on the local consultative council for the development of the Albury-Wodonga growth centre planned by the Whitlam government in 1973.

== Political career ==
In 1976, he stood for the Liberal Party for the seat of Benambra in the Victorian Legislative Assembly. Although it had been held by the National Party since 1932, he defeated the National Party candidate, Bill Baxter. Relations between the Liberals and Nationals have historically been strained in Victoria; at the time, the two parties' Victorian branches fought elections separately.

Lieberman served as Assistant Minister of Health from 1979–1981, Planning from 1979–1982, Minister of Minerals and Energy and the last Minister of Mines in 1981, and Minister of Local Government 1981–1982. He was a member of the Victorian Parliament until 1992.

During his term in the Victorian Parliament, he was an alternate delegate to the Australia Constitutional Convention in 1977, 1979 and 1983.

He stood for the seat of Indi for the Liberal Party at the 1993 federal election. He retained the seat, succeeding Ewen Cameron. During his three terms in parliament he served on several committees; he chaired the House of Representatives Standing Committee on Aboriginal and Torres Strait Islander Affairs and the Joint Committee on Publications. Despite his previous experience as a minister and opposition backbencher at the state level, he was never promoted to the ministry under John Howard.

He was in New York on 11 September 2001 attending a United Nations conference. He was staying in a flat 3 km north of the World Trade Center when the first plane hit.

After he decided not to stand for the seat of Indi, the Liberal Party preselected Melburnian Sophie Panopoulos as their candidate for the 2001 federal election.

== Retirement and honours ==
In 1999, he was elected to the Board of Directors of the Hume Building Society, a local building society in the Albury Wodonga area.

He became involved in raising money to upgrade facilities at Albury's Mercy Health Service where he headed the building gift-giving program committee. He has also served on the Council of La Trobe University.

In 2016 Lieberman was appointed a Member of the Order of Australia for significant service to the Parliaments of Australia and Victoria through a range of portfolio responsibilities, and to the community of Albury/Wodonga.

Victorian Legislative Assembly
Preceded by Tom Mitchell	Member for Benambra; 1976–1992	Succeeded by Tony Plowman
Parliament of Australia
Preceded by Ewen Cameron	Member for Indi; 1993–2001	Succeeded by Sophie Panopoulos
