= Bill Tilley =

Australian politician (born 1963)

Bill Tilley MP

Member of the Victorian Legislative Assembly for Benambra
- Incumbent
- Assumed office 25 November 2006
- Preceded by: Tony Plowman

Personal details
- Born: 29 March 1963 (age 63) Sydney, Australia
- Party: Liberal Party
- Occupation: Police officer
- Website: billtilley.com.au

Military service
- Allegiance: Australia
- Branch/service: Australian Army
- Years of service: 1981–1994
- Rank: Staff sergeant
- Unit: 5/7 RAR; Royal Australian Corps of Military Police

William John Tilley (born 29 March 1963) is the Liberal Party member for the seat of Benambra in the Victorian Legislative Assembly. He was first won the seat at the 2006 Victorian state election, beating Labor candidate and Wodonga mayor, Lisa Mahood, and former Nationals upper house member Bill Baxter.

Prior to his candidacy, Tilley served in the Australian Army and then the Victoria Police.

== Parliamentary career ==
Following the election of the Liberal Baillieu government at the 2010 Victorian state election, Tilley was appointed Parliamentary Secretary for Police. On 26 October 2011, the Office of Police Integrity released a report into the resignation of Assistant Police Commissioner Sir Ken Jones, stating that Tilley had met Sir Ken and Tristan Weston, a police officer on leave, while acting as an advisor to the Police Minister Peter Ryan, to complain about the then Police Commissioner Simon Overland. As a result of that report, Tilley resigned as Parliamentary Secretary for Police.

Events surrounding the subsequent Lawyer X scandal suggested that Tilley might have been unjustly tainted by the allegations made when he was Parliamentary Secretary. The revelations in March 2019 included that a former barrister for gangland figures, Nicola Gobbo, and threatened the foundations of the state's criminal justice system and some of Victoria Police's most celebrated convictions. The scandal, unfolding largely in secret and shrouded by suppression orders, took almost a decade to play out, until the Director of Public Prosecutions decided Gobbo's former clients had a right to know that she might have informed on them, breaching her duties as their lawyer.

In March 2024, Tilley announced that he would not re-contest Benambra at the 2026 Victorian state election, and would retire from politics after serving as the member for 20 years.

Victorian Legislative Assembly
Preceded by Tony Plowman	Member for Benambra; 2006–present	Incumbent
