= Frank Davis (Australian politician) =

Australian politician

Frank Davis CMG, OBE
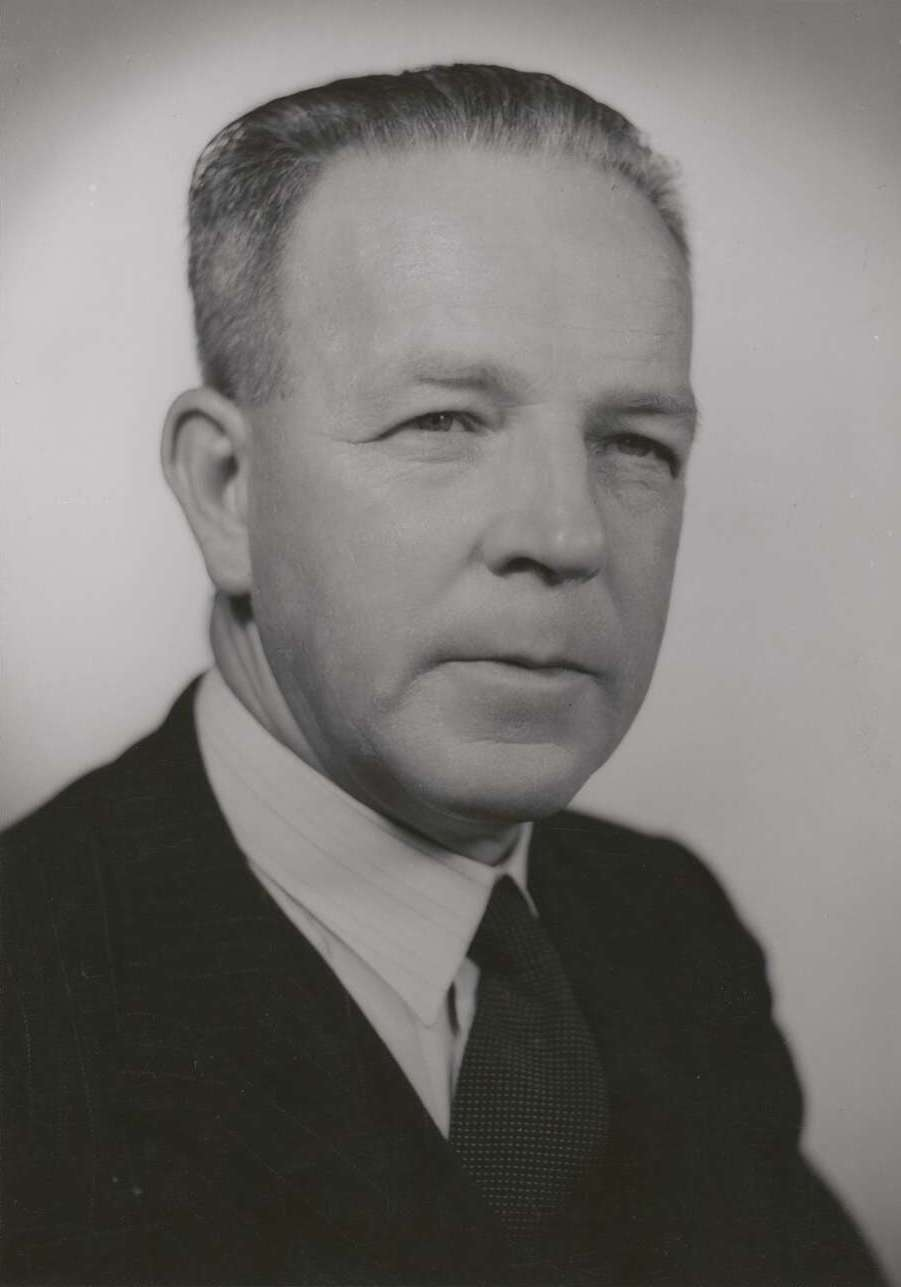

Member of the Australian Parliament for Deakin
- In office 10 December 1949 – 31 October 1966
- Preceded by: William Hutchinson
- Succeeded by: Alan Jarman

Personal details
- Born: 13 April 1900 Melbourne, Victoria
- Died: 28 February 1980 (aged 79)
- Party: Liberal Party of Australia
- Occupation: Meat industry executive

Francis John Davis, CMG, OBE (13 April 1900 – 28 February 1980) was an Australian politician. Born in Melbourne, he attended state schools before becoming a meat industry executive. A founding member of the Liberal Party, he was elected to the Australian House of Representatives in 1949 as the Liberal member for Deakin, succeeding William Hutchinson. He held the seat until his retirement in 1966. He later became Chairman of the Commonwealth Serum Laboratories. Davis died in 1980.

Parliament of Australia
Preceded by William Hutchinson	Member for Deakin; 1949–1966	Succeeded by Alan Jarman
