= Roy Paton =

Australian politician (1882–1947)

James Roy Paton (23 November 1882 – 25 April 1947) was an Australian politician.

Paton was born in Yabba, Victoria to grazier Archibald Paton and Ruth McMeekin. He attended Brighton Grammar School and then worked on the family property. On 30 April 1923 he married Isobel Mary McMeekin, with whom he had two children. He then moved to farm at Tallangatta, and from 1923 to 1947 served on Towong Shire Council, with two terms as president from 1929 to 1930 and from 1932 to 1933. He was the founding president of the Country Party's Tallangatta branch.

In October 1932 Paton won a by-election for the Victorian Legislative Assembly seat of Benambra. He was the party whip from 1943 to 1945, but died at Tallangatta in 1947.

Victorian Legislative Assembly
Preceded by Henry Beardmore	Member for Benambra; 1932–1947	Succeeded by Tom Mitchell
