= Tom Mitchell (Australian politician) =

Australian politician

Member of the Victorian Parliament for Benambra
- In office 7 June 1947 – 20 March 1976
- Preceded by: Roy Paton
- Succeeded by: Lou Lieberman

Attorney-General of Victoria
- In office June 1950 – 27 October 1952
- Preceded by: Trevor Oldham
- Succeeded by: Thomas Hollway
- In office 31 October 1952 – December 1952
- Preceded by: Thomas Hollway
- Succeeded by: Bill Slater

Solicitor-General of Victoria
- In office June 1950 – December 1951
- Preceded by: Trevor Oldham
- Succeeded by: Henry Winneke

Personal details
- Born: Thomas Walter Mitchell; 11 November 1906 Corryong, Victoria, Australia
- Died: 4 February 1984 (aged 77) Melbourne
- Party: Country Party
- Spouse: Sibyl Elyne Keith Chauvel (m. 1935)
- Education: University of Cambridge; Harvard University
- Sports career
- Sport: Skiing

Sports achievements and titles
- National finals: Slalom (1932, 1934, 1936, 1937); Downhill (1931, 1934)
- Military career
- Service: 2nd AIF
- Service years: 1940–1945
- Rank: Captain

Thomas Walter Mitchell (11 November 1906 – 4 February 1984) was an Australian politician, author and sportsman.

Mitchell was born at the family property "Towong Hill", near Corryong, Victoria and was educated at Cranbrook School, Sydney and Cambridge University from 1925 to 1930 before returning to Australia, and Towong Hill. At the time the property consisted of 17,000 acres (69 km^{2}) of prime land beside the Murray River, but today has been reduced to 2,300 acres (9 km^{2}), as sections have been split to various family members.

A keen skier, Mitchell founded the Australian National Ski Federation in 1932, captained the Australian skiing team and won gold medals in competitions against England and New Zealand. He was an Australian champion in the downhill and long-time member of the Ski Club of Australia. He and his wife Elyne Mitchell (daughter of General Sir Harry Chauvel) were the first people to ski the western slopes of the Main Range of the Snowy Mountains, including the demanding runs of "Little Austria".

Mitchell joined the Second Australian Imperial Force in 1940 and was a captain in the 2/22 Battalion and Headquarters 8th Division. He was captured by the Japanese in 1942 and was interned in the infamous Changi POW camp until 1945, being forced to work on the Burma Railway by his captors. While at Changi, he also helped found the Changi ski club. He later built a chapel, in memory of comrades lost during the war, on his property.

In 1947 he and Elyne, together with Ossie Rixon, set off in two four-wheel-drive vehicles to become the first people to cross the Australian Alps in a motor vehicle. "One", a Willys army jeep, sits in Corryong to this day.

He served as the Country Party member for Benambra in the Victorian Legislative Assembly from 1947 to 1976, as Attorney-General from June 1950 to 27 October 1952 and again from 31 October to December 1952. He was also Solicitor-General from June 1950 to December 1951, the last politician to hold the office, replaced by a non-political barrister, Henry Winneke. This was the start of a fundamental shift of the role of Solicitors-General in Australia.

He contributed to the official history of the Second World War and wrote several volumes on skiing and local history.

Mitchell died in Melbourne in 1984.

Victorian Legislative Assembly
Preceded by Roy Paton	Member for Benambra; 1947–1976	Succeeded by Lou Lieberman
Political offices
Preceded by Trevor Oldham	Solicitor-General of Victoria; June 1950 – December 1951	Succeeded by Henry Winneke QC
Preceded by Trevor Oldham	Attorney-General of Victoria; June 1950 – 27 October 1951	Succeeded by Thomas Hollway
Preceded by Thomas Hollway	Attorney-General of Victoria; 31 October 1951 – December 1952	Succeeded by Bill Slater
