= Paul Jones (Australian politician) =

Australian politician

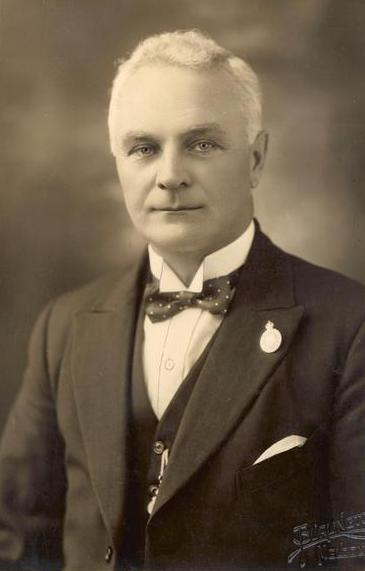

Member of the Australian Parliament for Indi
- In office 17 November 1928 – 19 December 1931
- Preceded by: Robert Cook
- Succeeded by: William Hutchinson

Personal details
- Born: 15 June 1878 Gaffneys Creek, Victoria
- Died: 28 December 1972 (aged 94)
- Party: Labor (until 1955); Democratic Labor (1955-1958)
- Education: University of Melbourne
- Occupation: Teacher

Paul Jones (15 June 1878 – 27 December 1972) was an Australian politician. Born in Gaffneys Creek, Victoria, he was educated at South Melbourne College before becoming a goldminer and teacher. He also studied at the University of Melbourne for a Master of Arts degree.

In 1928, he was elected to the Australian House of Representatives in unusual circumstances. Jones stood for the Labor Party in Indi, and was initially a heavy underdog in this strongly conservative seat. However Country Party incumbent Robert Cook mistakenly failed to lodge his renomination papers, leaving Jones to take the seat unopposed. This is one of the few known instances in the history of the Australian Parliament that a candidate has lost his or her seat in this way.

Jones narrowly held onto the seat in 1929, seeing off a spirited challenge from Cook. He was defeated in the United Australia Party landslide of 1931, suffering a 14-point swing. The Labor Party has not come close to winning the seat since then, only tallying 45 percent of the two-party vote once.

Jones was elected to the Victorian Legislative Council in 1938 for Doutta Galla Province. He remained in the council until 1958, but left the Labor Party in 1955, joining the Australian Labor Party (Anti-Communist), which later became the Democratic Labor Party.

Paul Jones died in 1972.

Parliament of Australia
Preceded by Robert Cook	Member for Indi; 1928 – 1931	Succeeded by William Hutchinson
