= Tony Plowman =

Australian politician

Antony Fulton "Tony" Plowman (born 21 December 1938) is an Australian former politician. He was the Liberal Party Member for the Electoral district of Benambra in the Legislative Assembly of the Parliament of Victoria, Australia from 1992 to 2006.

== Education and career ==
He attended Frankston Primary School (1943–49) and Geelong Grammar School (1950–56).

He was elected MLA for Benambra October 1992 and was re-elected in 1996, 1999, and 2002.

Prior to his election to Parliament, he had a diverse rural career. He was:

- a Jackaroo in Seymour 1957–58,
- a herdsman in Scotland and Iowa, USA 1962,
- a station hand, Benalla 1959–64,
- a stockman, 'Babiloora', Western Queensland 1965,
- a manager of a wool/wheat/sheep/cattle property, Benalla 1966–84,
- a Member of the Soil Conservation Authority 1984–86,
- a Land Protection Adviser to The Department of Conservation, Forests and Lands 1987–88,
- a Member of the Independent Committee of Review for Department of Water Resources 1988 and lastly
- a Manager, wool/grain/sheep and cattle property in Gerogery.

In Parliament, he has served as the:

- Opposition Parliamentary Secretary for Rural and Regional Development September 2001-November 2002,
- Opposition Parliamentary Secretary for Agriculture and Rural Victoria August–December 2002,
- Shadow Minister for Environment December 2002-January 2004,
- Spokesperson for Water December 2002-January 2004,
- Manager of Opposition Business (Assembly) and
- Shadow Minister for Water January 2004-December 2005.

He served on the Parliament's Public Accounts and Estimates Committee 1992–96, the Scrutiny of Acts and Regulations Committee 1996-99 and the Road Safety Committee and Legislative Assembly Privileges Committee 1999–2002.

He retired at the 2006 state election, and was succeeded by Liberal candidate Bill Tilley.
