= William Hutchinson (Australian politician) =

Australian politician

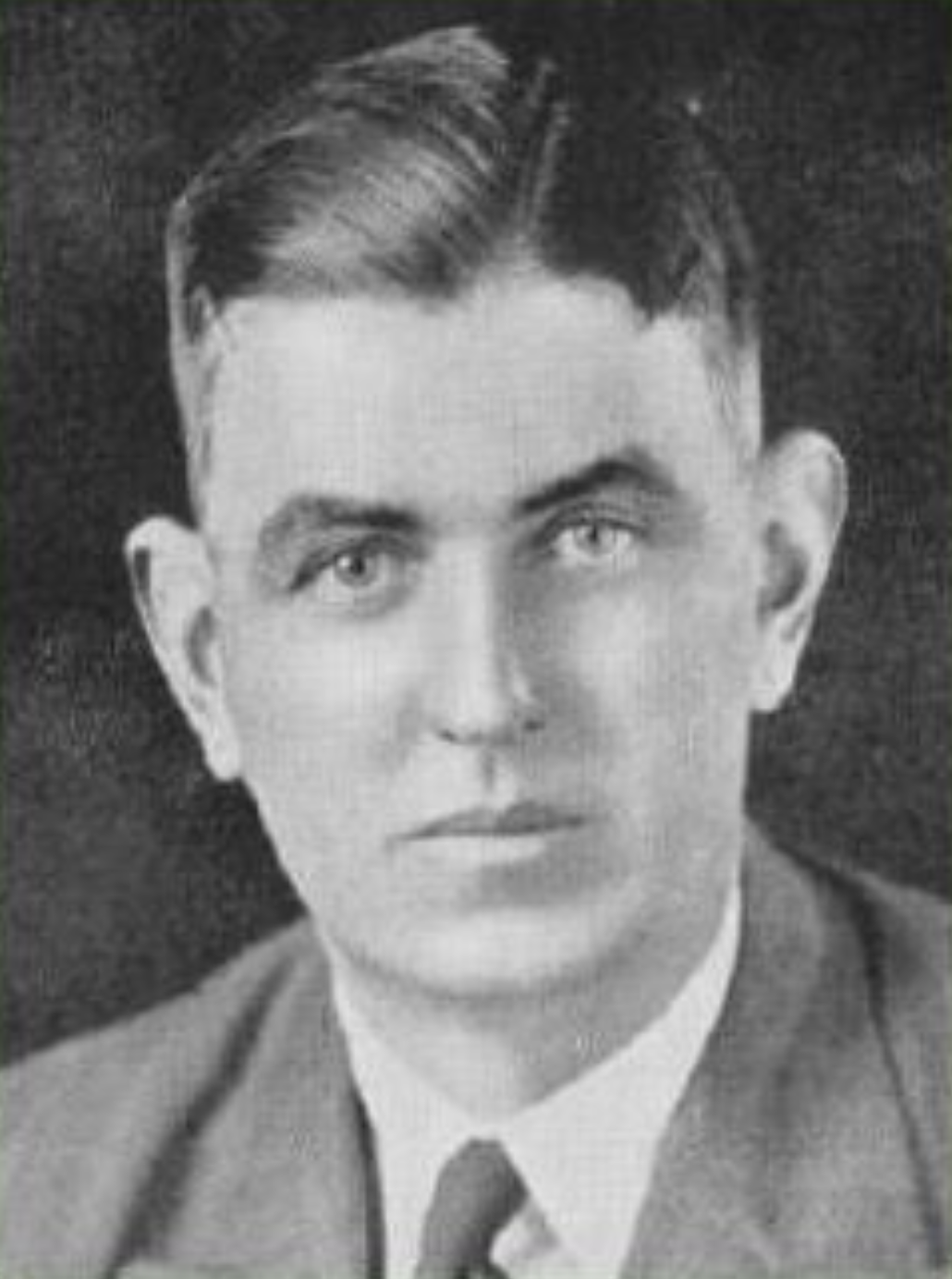

Member of the Australian Parliament for Indi
- In office 19 December 1931 – 23 October 1937
- Preceded by: Paul Jones
- Succeeded by: John McEwen

Member of the Australian Parliament for Deakin
- In office 23 October 1937 – 31 October 1949
- Preceded by: New seat
- Succeeded by: Frank Davis

Personal details
- Born: 7 January 1904 Maindample, Victoria
- Died: 29 September 1967 (aged 63)
- Party: UAP (1931–45); Liberal (1945–49)
- Occupation: Grazier

William Joseph Hutchinson (7 January 1904 – 29 September 1967) was an Australian politician. He was a member of the Australian House of Representatives from 1931 to 1949, representing the seats of Indi (1931–1937) and Deakin (1937–1949) for the United Australia Party and its successor the Liberal Party of Australia.

Hutchinson was born in Maindample, Victoria, and educated at Bonnie Doon State School, Mansfield High School and Scotch College in Melbourne. He worked for a Melbourne motor company and as a woolclasser in Sydney for the Australian Estates Company, before returning to work as a grazier on the family farm at Bonnie Doon, ultimately taking the farm over upon his father's retirement. He was a member of the central executive of the National Federation and a leading figure in the Young Nationalists' Association, and locally was captain of the Bonnie Doon Football Club.

In 1931, he was elected to the Australian House of Representatives as the United Australia Party member for Indi, at 28 years of age being the youngest member of that parliament. Together with Labor member for Oxley Francis Baker, he was the first member of the House born after Federation. He travelled widely overseas and in parliament was considered knowledgeable about international affairs; he was also a prominent voice within his party on primary producers' issues.

Hutchinson held Indi until 1937, when he successfully contested the new seat of Deakin, which had consumed the southern end of the old Indi seat in an electoral redistribution. He attempted to list for World War II service in 1940, but was rejected on account of defective eyesight. In 1944, the United Australia Party became the Liberal Party of Australia, which Hutchinson duly joined. He held Deakin until 1949, when he retired to become a grazier. He died in 1967.

Parliament of Australia
Preceded by Paul Jones	Member for Indi; 1931–1937	Succeeded by John McEwen
Preceded by New seat	Member for Deakin; 1937–1949	Succeeded by Frank Davis
