= John Leckie (Australian politician) =

Australian politician (1872–1947)

The Honourable John Leckie
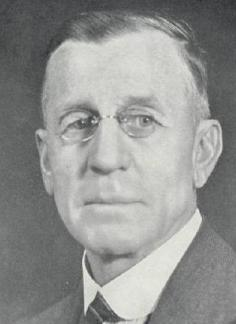

Minister for Aircraft Production
- In office 26 June 1941 – 7 October 1941
- Prime Minister: Robert Menzies; Arthur Fadden
- Preceded by: (new title)
- Succeeded by: Don Cameron

Senator for Victoria
- In office 1 July 1935 – 30 June 1947

Member of the Australian Parliament for Indi
- In office 5 May 1917 – 13 December 1919
- Preceded by: Parker Moloney
- Succeeded by: Robert Cook

Personal details
- Born: 14 October 1872 Alexandra, Victoria, Australia
- Died: 25 September 1947 (aged 74) Hawthorn, Victoria, Australia
- Party: Liberal (1913–17); Nationalist (1917–1931); UAP (1931–45); Liberal (1945–47)
- Spouse(s): 1) May Beatrix Johnston; 2) Hattie Martha Knight
- Relations: Roland Leckie (son); Pattie Menzies (daughter); Robert Menzies (son-in-law); Connie Hesketh (daughter); John Hesketh (son-in-law); Gwenyth Leckie (daughter)
- Occupation: Storekeeper

John William Leckie (14 October 1872 – 25 September 1947) was an Australian politician. He served as a Senator for Victoria from 1935 to 1947, having previously been a member of the House of Representatives from 1917 to 1919 and the Victorian Legislative Assembly from 1913 to 1917.

== Early life ==
Leckie was born at Alexandra, Victoria and educated at Scotch College, Melbourne. He played Australian rules football for Fitzroy Football Club (then in the Victorian Football Association) in 1895. He studied medicine at the University of Melbourne for two years, but after falling out with his father he prospected for gold in Kalgoorlie, Western Australia and played football in Fremantle. In 1897, he returned to Alexandra to run the family store, his father having died. In April 1898, he married May Beatrix Johnston. His wife died in 1910 and he moved to Melbourne in 1912 and co-founded a firm of lithographic printers and canister manufacturers. He married Hattie Martha Knight in April 1917.

In 1920, the eldest of his daughters from his first marriage, Pattie Maie, married future Prime Minister Robert Menzies.

== Political career ==
=== Victorian politics ===
Leckie was a member of the Alexandra Shire Council from 1900 to 1911 and was shire president in 1904–05. During his council service, he ran unsuccessfully for the Anti-Socialist Protectionists for the House of Representatives seat of Mernda at the 1906 election. After leaving local government in 1911, he was elected as member for Benambra in the Victorian Legislative Assembly in 1913 as a Commonwealth Liberal Party candidate.

=== Federal politics ===
Leckie won the federal seat of Indi in the 1917 election for the Nationalist Party. He lost his seat at the 1919 election to a Victorian Farmers' Union candidate. He ran unsuccessfully for the state seat of Upper Goulburn in 1921 and then concentrated on his business and business groups.

At the 1934 election, Leckie was elected Senator for Victoria as a member of the United Australia Party. In October 1940, he became Minister without portfolio assisting the Minister for Trade and Customs and Minister without portfolio assisting the Minister for Labour and National Service in his son-in-law's ministry. In June 1941, he became Minister for Aircraft Production and held that position until the defeat of the Fadden government in October 1941. During the UAP's term in opposition, he was deputy leader of the party in the Senate. He lost his bid to be re-elected at the 1946 election and served out his term ending in June 1947.

Three months later, Leckie died of cancer at his home in the Melbourne suburb of Hawthorn, survived by his wife and their son and by three daughters from his first marriage. His son Roland Leckie was the member for the state seat of Evelyn from 1950 to 1952 and later a crown prosecutor and a judge of the County Court.

Political offices
New title	Minister for Aircraft Production; 1941	Succeeded by Don Cameron
Parliament of Australia
Preceded by Parker Moloney	Member for Indi; 1917–1919	Succeeded by Robert Cook
