= Electoral results for the Division of Burke (1969–2004) =

Australian division election results

This is a list of electoral results for the Division of Burke in Australian federal elections from the division's creation in 1969 to its abolition in 2004.

== Members ==
| Member | Party | Term |
|---|---|---|
| Keith Johnson | Labor | 1969–1980 |
| Andrew Theophanous | Labor | 1980–1984 |
| Neil O'Keefe | Labor | 1984–2001 |
| Brendan O'Connor | Labor | 2001–2004 |

== Election results ==
=== Elections in the 2000s ===
==== 2001 ====
2001 Australian federal election: Burke
| Party | Candidate | Votes | % | ±% |
|---|---|---|---|---|
| Labor | Brendan O'Connor | 39,138 | 47.74 | −2.25 |
| Liberal | Chris Dawe | 31,282 | 38.16 | +2.13 |
| Greens | Marcus Ward | 6,062 | 7.39 | +5.48 |
| Democrats | Geoff Lutz | 5,493 | 6.70 | +0.72 |
| Total formal votes | | 81,975 | 96.43 | +1.61 |
| Informal votes | | 3,031 | 3.57 | −1.61 |
| Turnout | | 85,006 | 95.98 | |
Two-party-preferred result
| Labor | Brendan O'Connor | 45,504 | 55.51 | −2.10 |
| Liberal | Chris Dawe | 36,471 | 44.49 | +2.10 |
| Labor hold | | Swing | −2.10 | |

=== Elections in the 1990s ===
==== 1998 ====
1998 Australian federal election: Burke
| Party | Candidate | Votes | % | ±% |
|---|---|---|---|---|
| Labor | Neil O'Keefe | 36,516 | 50.00 | −0.95 |
| Liberal | Serge Petrovich | 26,317 | 36.03 | −2.41 |
| Democrats | Vaughan Williams | 4,365 | 5.98 | −3.64 |
| One Nation | Frank Preston | 3,319 | 4.54 | +4.54 |
| Greens | Paul Fyffe | 1,397 | 1.91 | +1.91 |
| Independent | Rod Hardy | 957 | 1.31 | +1.31 |
| Natural Law | Ngaire Mason | 163 | 0.22 | −0.78 |
| Total formal votes | | 73,034 | 94.82 | −2.21 |
| Informal votes | | 3,988 | 5.18 | +2.21 |
| Turnout | | 77,022 | 95.98 | −0.23 |
Two-party-preferred result
| Labor | Neil O'Keefe | 42,074 | 57.61 | +0.58 |
| Liberal | Serge Petrovich | 30,960 | 42.39 | −0.58 |
| Labor hold | | Swing | +0.58 | |

==== 1996 ====
1996 Australian federal election: Burke
| Party | Candidate | Votes | % | ±% |
|---|---|---|---|---|
| Labor | Neil O'Keefe | 35,949 | 50.95 | −1.93 |
| Liberal | Anthony Moore | 27,122 | 38.44 | −1.41 |
| Democrats | Victor Kaye | 6,782 | 9.61 | +5.08 |
| Natural Law | Michael Dickins | 705 | 1.00 | +0.28 |
| Total formal votes | | 70,558 | 97.04 | −0.40 |
| Informal votes | | 2,155 | 2.96 | +0.40 |
| Turnout | | 72,713 | 96.21 | −0.22 |
Two-party-preferred result
| Labor | Neil O'Keefe | 40,069 | 57.03 | −0.69 |
| Liberal | Anthony Moore | 30,191 | 42.97 | +0.69 |
| Labor hold | | Swing | −0.69 | |

==== 1993 ====
1993 Australian federal election: Burke
| Party | Candidate | Votes | % | ±% |
|---|---|---|---|---|
| Labor | Neil O'Keefe | 40,067 | 55.39 | +12.51 |
| Liberal | Stephen Mitchell | 27,047 | 37.39 | −3.92 |
| Democrats | Iain Ralph | 3,180 | 4.40 | −11.42 |
| Call to Australia | Ian Burrowes | 1,491 | 2.06 | +2.06 |
| Natural Law | Michael Dickins | 552 | 0.76 | +0.76 |
| Total formal votes | | 72,337 | 97.29 | +1.19 |
| Informal votes | | 2,013 | 2.71 | −1.19 |
| Turnout | | 74,350 | 96.43 | |
Two-party-preferred result
| Labor | Neil O'Keefe | 43,345 | 59.96 | +6.66 |
| Liberal | Stephen Mitchell | 28,941 | 40.04 | −6.66 |
| Labor hold | | Swing | +6.66 | |

==== 1990 ====
1990 Australian federal election: Burke
| Party | Candidate | Votes | % | ±% |
|---|---|---|---|---|
| Labor | Neil O'Keefe | 27,102 | 42.9 | −11.1 |
| Liberal | Ian Lindsay | 26,114 | 41.3 | +7.5 |
| Democrats | Patrick McCurry | 9,996 | 15.8 | +8.6 |
| Total formal votes | | 63,212 | 96.1 | |
| Informal votes | | 2,564 | 3.9 | |
| Turnout | | 65,776 | 95.8 | |
Two-party-preferred result
| Labor | Neil O'Keefe | 33,684 | 53.3 | −5.8 |
| Liberal | Ian Lindsay | 29,505 | 46.7 | +5.8 |
| Labor hold | | Swing | −5.8 | |

=== Elections in the 1980s ===
==== 1987 ====
1987 Australian federal election: Burke
| Party | Candidate | Votes | % | ±% |
|---|---|---|---|---|
| Labor | Neil O'Keefe | 32,738 | 49.3 | +0.6 |
| Liberal | Peter Dale | 25,534 | 38.5 | −2.8 |
| Democrats | Susan Mullington | 4,793 | 7.2 | +1.4 |
| National | Barry McLeod | 3,278 | 4.9 | +1.7 |
| Total formal votes | | 66,343 | 95.4 | |
| Informal votes | | 3,214 | 4.6 | |
| Turnout | | 69,557 | 94.9 | |
Two-party-preferred result
| Labor | Neil O'Keefe | 36,098 | 54.4 | +1.5 |
| Liberal | Peter Dale | 30,206 | 45.6 | −1.5 |
| Labor hold | | Swing | +1.5 | |

==== 1984 ====
1984 Australian federal election: Burke
| Party | Candidate | Votes | % | ±% |
|---|---|---|---|---|
| Labor | Neil O'Keefe | 27,445 | 48.7 | −0.5 |
| Liberal | Marisa d'Agostino | 23,273 | 41.3 | −2.4 |
| Democrats | George Hunter | 2,985 | 5.3 | −0.8 |
| National | Leslie Vidler | 1,823 | 3.2 | +3.2 |
| Democratic Labor | Genevieve Cormick | 862 | 1.5 | +1.5 |
| Total formal votes | | 56,389 | 91.7 | |
| Informal votes | | 5,073 | 8.3 | |
| Turnout | | 61,462 | 95.6 | |
Two-party-preferred result
| Labor | Neil O'Keefe | 29,836 | 52.9 | −0.9 |
| Liberal | Marisa d'Agostino | 26,546 | 47.1 | +0.9 |
| Labor hold | | Swing | −0.9 | |

==== 1983 ====
1983 Australian federal election: Burke
| Party | Candidate | Votes | % | ±% |
|---|---|---|---|---|
| Labor | Andrew Theophanous | 46,171 | 60.9 | +6.8 |
| Liberal | Bernie Finn | 24,294 | 32.0 | −6.2 |
| Democrats | George Hunter | 4,611 | 6.1 | −1.6 |
| Socialist Workers | Evelyn Robson | 788 | 1.0 | +1.0 |
| Total formal votes | | 75,864 | 97.2 | |
| Informal votes | | 2,163 | 2.8 | |
| Turnout | | 78,027 | 95.9 | |
Two-party-preferred result
| Labor | Andrew Theophanous | | 65.5 | +6.7 |
| Liberal | Bernie Finn | | 34.5 | −6.7 |
| Labor hold | | Swing | +6.7 | |

==== 1980 ====
1980 Australian federal election: Burke
| Party | Candidate | Votes | % | ±% |
|---|---|---|---|---|
| Labor | Andrew Theophanous | 37,984 | 54.1 | +3.7 |
| Liberal | Greg Ross | 26,803 | 38.2 | +5.9 |
| Democrats | Eric Spencer | 5,413 | 7.7 | −3.4 |
| Total formal votes | | 70,200 | 96.8 | |
| Informal votes | | 2,357 | 3.2 | |
| Turnout | | 72,557 | 95.0 | |
Two-party-preferred result
| Labor | Andrew Theophanous | | 58.8 | +2.2 |
| Liberal | Greg Ross | | 41.2 | −2.2 |
| Labor hold | | Swing | +2.2 | |

=== Elections in the 1970s ===
==== 1977 ====
1977 Australian federal election: Burke
| Party | Candidate | Votes | % | ±% |
|---|---|---|---|---|
| Labor | Keith Johnson | 32,248 | 50.4 | −0.7 |
| Liberal | Mihaly Lengyel | 20,680 | 32.3 | −7.8 |
| Democrats | Eric Spencer | 7,122 | 11.1 | +11.1 |
| Democratic Labor | Colin Walsh | 3,963 | 6.2 | +0.9 |
| Total formal votes | | 64,013 | 96.5 | |
| Informal votes | | 2,341 | 3.5 | |
| Turnout | | 66,354 | 95.8 | |
Two-party-preferred result
| Labor | Keith Johnson | | 56.6 | +2.7 |
| Liberal | Mihaly Lengyel | | 43.4 | −2.7 |
| Labor hold | | Swing | +2.7 | |

==== 1975 ====
1975 Australian federal election: Burke
| Party | Candidate | Votes | % | ±% |
|---|---|---|---|---|
| Labor | Keith Johnson | 45,634 | 54.2 | −7.0 |
| Liberal | Claus Salger | 31,103 | 37.0 | +9.1 |
| Democratic Labor | Colin Walsh | 4,442 | 5.3 | −0.3 |
| Independent | Michael Dupla | 2,949 | 3.5 | +3.5 |
| Total formal votes | | 84,128 | 97.3 | |
| Informal votes | | 2,318 | 2.7 | |
| Turnout | | 86,446 | 96.4 | |
Two-party-preferred result
| Labor | Keith Johnson | | 57.0 | −8.8 |
| Liberal | Claus Salger | | 43.0 | +8.8 |
| Labor hold | | Swing | −8.8 | |

==== 1974 ====
1974 Australian federal election: Burke
| Party | Candidate | Votes | % | ±% |
|---|---|---|---|---|
| Labor | Keith Johnson | 46,977 | 61.2 | −2.4 |
| Liberal | Claus Salger | 21,411 | 27.9 | +1.9 |
| Democratic Labor | Colin Walsh | 4,328 | 5.6 | −4.9 |
| Australia | Alexander Gerocs | 4,017 | 5.2 | +5.2 |
| Total formal votes | | 76,733 | 97.0 | |
| Informal votes | | 2,382 | 3.0 | |
| Turnout | | 79,115 | 96.8 | |
Two-party-preferred result
| Labor | Keith Johnson | | 65.8 | +1.1 |
| Liberal | Claus Salger | | 34.2 | −1.1 |
| Labor hold | | Swing | +1.1 | |

==== 1972 ====
1972 Australian federal election: Burke
| Party | Candidate | Votes | % | ±% |
|---|---|---|---|---|
| Labor | Keith Johnson | 39,510 | 63.6 | +6.8 |
| Liberal | Howard Thain | 16,143 | 26.0 | −4.2 |
| Democratic Labor | Colin Walsh | 6,502 | 10.5 | −0.1 |
| Total formal votes | | 62,155 | 96.8 | |
| Informal votes | | 2,034 | 3.2 | |
| Turnout | | 64,189 | 96.5 | |
Two-party-preferred result
| Labor | Keith Johnson | | 64.7 | +5.5 |
| Liberal | Howard Thain | | 35.3 | −5.5 |
| Labor hold | | Swing | +5.5 | |

=== Elections in the 1960s ===
==== 1969 ====
1969 Australian federal election: Burke
| Party | Candidate | Votes | % | ±% |
|---|---|---|---|---|
| Labor | Keith Johnson | 26,798 | 56.8 | +10.4 |
| Liberal | John Williams | 14,230 | 30.2 | −0.9 |
| Democratic Labor | Terence Scully | 5,003 | 10.6 | −3.3 |
| Independent | Kathleen Laherty | 633 | 1.3 | +1.3 |
| Australia | Richard Smith | 506 | 1.1 | +1.1 |
| Total formal votes | | 47,170 | 94.7 | |
| Informal votes | | 2,621 | 5.3 | |
| Turnout | | 49,791 | 96.2 | |
Two-party-preferred result
| Labor | Keith Johnson | | 59.2 | +7.2 |
| Liberal | John Williams | | 40.8 | −7.2 |
| Labor notional hold | | Swing | +7.2 | |
