= Results of the 1998 Australian federal election in Victoria =

1998 Australian federal election (Victoria)
← 1996	3 October 1998	2001 →

All 37 Victorian seats in the Australian House of Representatives and 6 seats in the Australian Senate
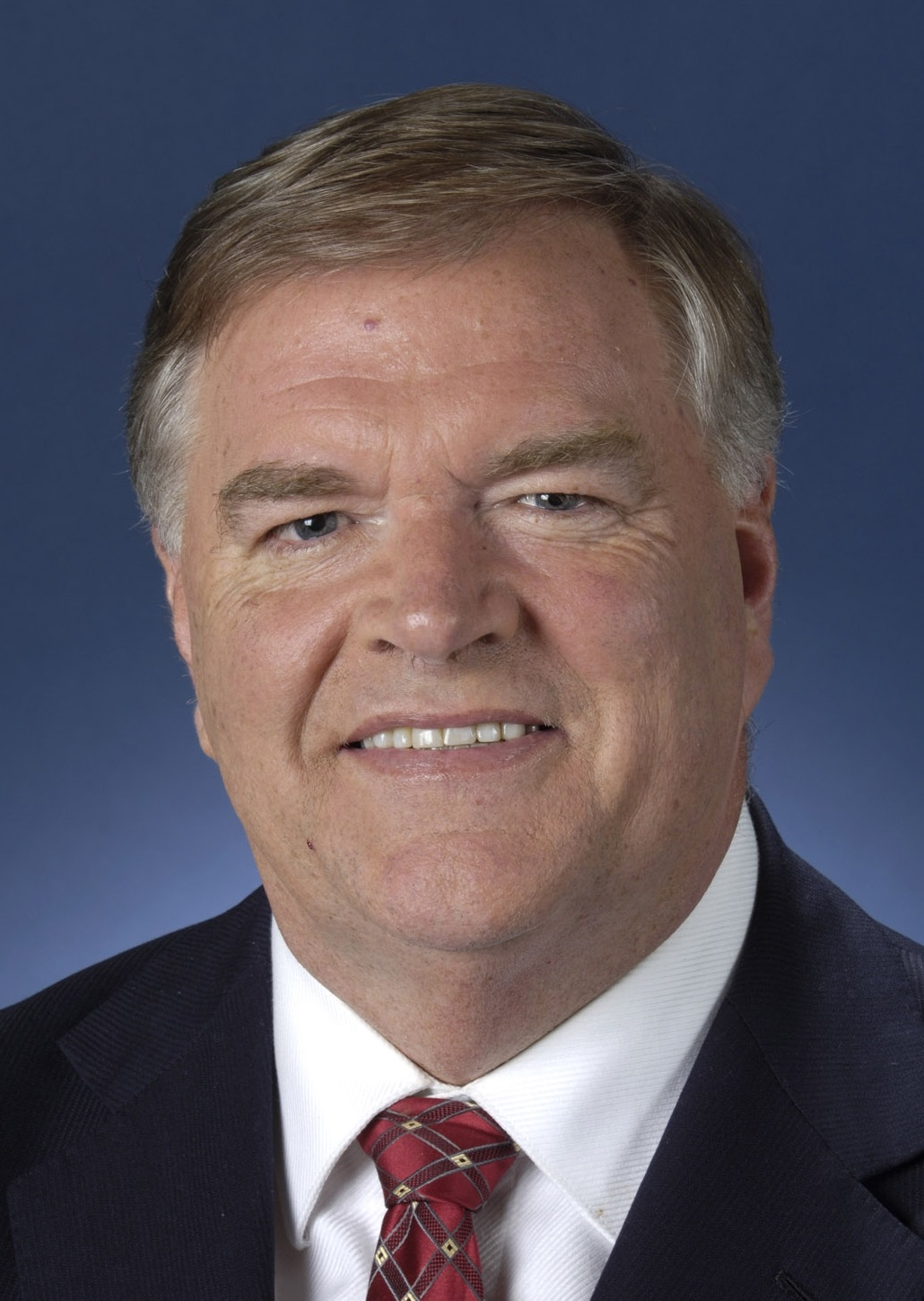

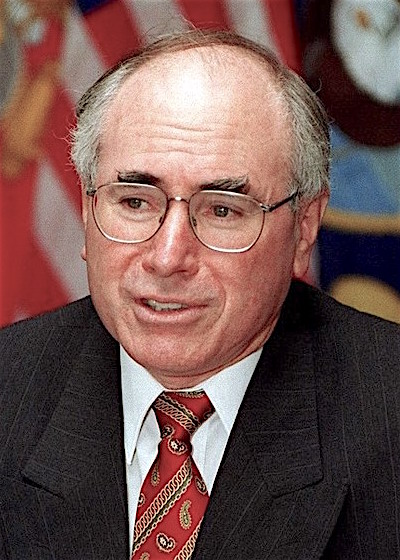
	First party	Second party
Leader	Kim Beazley	John Howard
Party	Labor	Liberal/National coalition
Last election	16 seats	21 seats
Seats won	19 seats	18 seats
Seat change	▲3	▼3
Popular vote	1,261,289	1,131,375
Percentage	44.4%	39.8%
Swing	▲1.5	▼4.8
TPP	53.53%	46.47%
TPP swing	▲3.22	▼3.22
- Results by division for the House of Representatives, shaded by winning party's margin of victory.

This is a list of electoral division results for the Australian 1998 federal election in the state of Victoria.

== Overall results ==
Turnout 95.6% (CV) — Informal 3.5%
Party	Votes	%	Swing	Seats	Change
Liberal	1,053,990	37.08	-2.82	16	▼3
National	77,385	2.72	-1.90	2	Steady
Liberal/National Coalition	1,131,375	39.80	-4.72	18	▼3
Labor	1,261,289	44.37	1.45	19	▲3
Democrats	171,091	6.02	-1.33		
One Nation	105,798	3.72	3.72		
Greens	59,383	2.09	0.19		
Independent	38,232	1.34	-0.29		
Unity	29,265	1.03	1.03		
Shooters	12,675	0.45	0.45		
Natural Law	9,654	0.34	0.00		
Australia First	6,455	0.23	0.00		
Progressive Labour	4,991	0.18	0.00		
Reform	4,220	0.15	0.00		
Christian Democrats	3,793	0.13	0.00		
Citizens Electoral Council	2,914	0.10	0.00		
Abolish Child Support	945	0.03	0.00		
Democratic Socialist	425	0.01	0.00		
Republican	176	0.01	0.00		
Total	2,842,681			37	
Two-party-preferred vote
Labor	1,521,560	53.53	3.22	19	▲3
Liberal/National Coalition	1,321,121	46.47	-3.22	18	▼3
Invalid/blank votes	103,524	3.5			
Turnout	2,946,205	95.6			
Registered voters	3,081,632				
Source: Federal Elections 1998

== Results by division ==
=== Aston ===
1998 Australian federal election: Aston
Party	Candidate	Votes	%	±%
Liberal	Peter Nugent	38,645	48.49	−3.10
Labor	Peter Lockwood	30,689	38.51	−0.18
Democrats	Darrell Stosegan	6,000	7.53	−1.38
One Nation	Ian Cameron	2,306	2.89	+2.89
Unity	Guosheng Chen	1,371	1.72	+1.72
Reform	Paul Rigoni	685	0.86	+0.86
Total formal votes		79,696	97.17	−0.43
Informal votes		2,324	2.83	+0.43
Turnout		82,020	96.64	−0.38
Two-party-preferred result
Liberal	Peter Nugent	43,227	54.24	−1.35
Labor	Peter Lockwood	36,469	45.76	+1.35
Liberal hold		Swing	−1.35	

=== Ballarat ===
1998 Australian federal election: Ballarat
Party	Candidate	Votes	%	±%
Liberal	Michael Ronaldson	34,527	45.23	−3.77
Labor	Marg Card	31,232	40.92	−0.98
One Nation	John Blanchard	3,738	4.90	+4.90
Democrats	Peta Price	2,824	3.70	−0.52
Shooters	John Wiley	1,569	2.06	+2.06
Greens	Malcolm Campbell	1,083	1.42	+1.42
Christian Democrats	Frank Colosimo	840	1.10	−1.24
Independent	Ian Harrison	188	0.25	+0.25
Unity	Margaret Taylor	182	0.24	+0.24
Independent	Alex Graham	147	0.19	+0.19
Total formal votes		76,330	96.45	−1.44
Informal votes		2,809	3.55	+1.44
Turnout		79,139	96.73	−0.09
Two-party-preferred result
Liberal	Michael Ronaldson	40,280	52.77	−0.90
Labor	Marg Card	36,050	47.23	+0.90
Liberal hold		Swing	−0.90	

=== Batman ===
1998 Australian federal election: Batman
Party	Candidate	Votes	%	±%
Labor	Martin Ferguson	53,034	65.84	+7.01
Liberal	Lauri Rowe	16,290	20.22	−1.01
Democrats	Marc Nicholls	4,038	5.01	−1.01
Greens	Helen Rosenbaum	3,705	4.60	+0.99
Natural Law	Martin Richardson	1,486	1.84	−0.95
Militant Socialist	Matt Wilson	1,087	1.35	+1.35
Unity	Sami Mazloum	659	0.82	+0.82
Citizens Electoral Council	Wayne Barwick	254	0.32	+0.32
Total formal votes		80,553	96.09	+1.17
Informal votes		3,280	3.91	−1.17
Turnout		83,833	94.48	−0.75
Two-party-preferred result
Labor	Martin Ferguson	61,569	76.43	+5.12
Liberal	Lauri Rowe	18,984	23.57	−5.12
Labor hold		Swing	+5.12	

=== Bendigo ===
1998 Australian federal election: Bendigo
Party	Candidate	Votes	%	±%
Labor	Steve Gibbons	33,483	42.91	+0.09
Liberal	Max Turner	28,004	35.89	−8.86
One Nation	Karel Zegers	5,159	6.61	+6.61
Democrats	Alan Tilley	3,533	4.53	−1.11
National	Scott Mitchell	2,479	3.18	+3.18
Greens	David Rhys Jones	2,080	2.67	−0.60
Reform	Alfred Thorpe	1,108	1.42	+1.42
Independent	Peter Morley	846	1.08	+1.08
Natural Law	Alan McDonald	526	0.67	+0.37
Unity	Gayle Maddigan	361	0.46	+0.46
Australia First	Peter Biggs	332	0.43	+0.43
Citizens Electoral Council	Lyn Speirs	126	0.16	+0.16
Total formal votes		78,037	95.87	−2.09
Informal votes		3,366	4.13	+2.09
Turnout		81,403	97.01	+0.08
Two-party-preferred result
Labor	Steve Gibbons	41,726	53.47	+4.35
Liberal	Max Turner	36,311	46.53	−4.35
Labor gain from Liberal		Swing	+4.35	

=== Bruce ===
1998 Australian federal election: Bruce
Party	Candidate	Votes	%	±%
Labor	Alan Griffin	38,165	48.66	+2.84
Liberal	Jim Wood	30,257	38.58	−7.05
Democrats	Adam McBeth	4,718	6.02	−0.08
One Nation	Laurence Lowe	2,296	2.93	+2.93
Unity	Toan Huynh	1,336	1.70	+1.70
Greens	Colin Smith	1,195	1.52	−0.49
Abolish Child Support	Dikran Chabdjian	253	0.32	+0.32
Natural Law	Michael Soos	209	0.27	−0.17
Total formal votes		78,429	96.31	−0.72
Informal votes		3,001	3.69	+0.72
Turnout		81,430	96.19	−0.26
Two-party-preferred result
Labor	Alan Griffin	44,485	56.72	+5.96
Liberal	Jim Wood	33,944	43.28	−5.96
Labor hold		Swing	+5.96	

=== Burke ===
1998 Australian federal election: Burke
Party	Candidate	Votes	%	±%
Labor	Neil O'Keefe	36,516	50.00	−0.95
Liberal	Serge Petrovich	26,317	36.03	−2.41
Democrats	Vaughan Williams	4,365	5.98	−3.64
One Nation	Frank Preston	3,319	4.54	+4.54
Greens	Paul Fyffe	1,397	1.91	+1.91
Independent	Rod Hardy	957	1.31	+1.31
Natural Law	Ngaire Mason	163	0.22	−0.78
Total formal votes		73,034	94.82	−2.21
Informal votes		3,988	5.18	+2.21
Turnout		77,022	95.98	−0.23
Two-party-preferred result
Labor	Neil O'Keefe	42,074	57.61	+0.58
Liberal	Serge Petrovich	30,960	42.39	−0.58
Labor hold		Swing	+0.58	

=== Calwell ===
1998 Australian federal election: Calwell
Party	Candidate	Votes	%	±%
Labor	Andrew Theophanous	50,022	62.36	+1.02
Liberal	Trevor Blake	21,111	26.32	−2.52
Democrats	Robert Livesay	5,363	6.69	−0.25
Unity	Benal Keceli	2,968	3.70	+3.70
Natural Law	Michael Harris	755	0.94	+0.21
Total formal votes		80,219	96.55	+0.31
Informal votes		2,864	3.45	−0.31
Turnout		83,083	95.15	−0.48
Two-party-preferred result
Labor	Andrew Theophanous	55,334	68.98	+1.78
Liberal	Trevor Blake	24,885	31.02	−1.78
Labor hold		Swing	+1.78	

=== Casey ===
1998 Australian federal election: Casey
Party	Candidate	Votes	%	±%
Liberal	Michael Wooldridge	34,322	46.39	−3.64
Labor	Frank Armenio	24,732	33.42	−2.38
Democrats	John McLaren	5,481	7.41	−2.53
One Nation	Stephen Beck	2,412	3.26	+3.26
Independent	John Mackellar	2,067	2.79	+2.79
Greens	Chris James	1,634	2.21	−1.07
Shooters	Judy Warwick	1,070	1.45	+1.45
Christian Democrats	Basil Smidt	917	1.24	+1.24
Natural Law	Robert Kendi	557	0.75	+0.75
Unity	Gary Smart	405	0.55	+0.55
Independent	Steve Raskovy	396	0.54	+0.54
Total formal votes		73,993	95.98	−1.26
Informal votes		3,098	4.02	+1.26
Turnout		77,091	96.11	−0.55
Two-party-preferred result
Liberal	Michael Wooldridge	40,598	54.87	−1.78
Labor	Frank Armenio	33,395	45.13	+1.78
Liberal hold		Swing	−1.78	

=== Chisholm ===
1998 Australian federal election: Chisholm
Party	Candidate	Votes	%	±%
Labor	Anna Burke	33,275	42.38	+1.99
Liberal	Peter Vlahos	32,771	41.74	−5.39
Democrats	Bernie Millane	5,392	6.87	−0.40
Greens	Julian Guess	2,431	3.10	+0.44
Unity	Ka-Sing Chua	2,214	2.82	+2.82
One Nation	Douglas Hesse	2,064	2.63	+2.63
Natural Law	Mark Toomey	193	0.25	−0.22
Republican	Nicholas Fell	176	0.22	+0.22
Total formal votes		78,516	96.43	−1.01
Informal votes		2,910	3.57	+1.01
Turnout		81,426	95.68	−0.51
Two-party-preferred result
Labor	Anna Burke	40,887	52.07	+4.67
Liberal	Peter Vlahos	37,629	47.93	−4.67
Labor gain from Liberal		Swing	+4.67	

=== Corangamite ===
1998 Australian federal election: Corangamite
Party	Candidate	Votes	%	±%
Liberal	Stewart McArthur	34,336	46.02	−6.64
Labor	Michael Bjork-Billings	26,923	36.08	+0.22
Democrats	Jeffrey Paull	4,765	6.39	−5.10
One Nation	Duncan Maclean	4,140	5.55	+5.55
Greens	Adrian Whitehead	2,292	3.07	+3.07
Independent	Simon Arundell	1,634	2.19	+2.19
Unity	Robert Harwood	525	0.70	+0.70
Total formal votes		74,615	97.45	−0.33
Informal votes		1,949	2.55	+0.33
Turnout		76,564	95.79	−0.90
Two-party-preferred result
Liberal	Stewart McArthur	40,665	54.50	−3.19
Labor	Michael Bjork-Billings	33,950	45.50	+3.19
Liberal hold		Swing	−3.19	

=== Corio ===
1998 Australian federal election: Corio
Party	Candidate	Votes	%	±%
Labor	Gavan O'Connor	38,608	50.82	+0.06
Liberal	Dennis Jensen	25,561	33.64	−5.93
Democrats	Andre Csausov	4,352	5.73	−2.04
One Nation	Robert Grant	3,854	5.07	+5.07
Progressive Labour	Therese Self	3,116	4.10	+4.10
Unity	Michael Garbutcheon Singh	486	0.64	+0.64
Total formal votes		75,977	96.79	−0.18
Informal votes		2,516	3.21	+0.18
Turnout		78,493	95.64	−1.05
Two-party-preferred result
Labor	Gavan O'Connor	46,618	61.36	+4.56
Liberal	Dennis Jensen	29,359	38.64	−4.56
Labor hold		Swing	+4.56	

=== Deakin ===
1998 Australian federal election: Deakin
Party	Candidate	Votes	%	±%
Liberal	Phil Barresi	34,047	43.95	−0.77
Labor	Peter Bertolus	30,079	38.83	+0.17
Democrats	John Siddons	6,177	7.97	−0.90
One Nation	Paul Coelli	2,232	2.88	+2.88
Greens	Robyn Evans	1,929	2.49	+0.05
	Tim Petherbridge	1,486	1.92	+1.92
Unity	Geoffrey Teng	1,289	1.66	+1.66
Natural Law	Linda Keath	230	0.30	−0.66
Total formal votes		77,469	96.81	−0.32
Informal votes		2,549	3.19	+0.32
Turnout		80,018	96.05	−0.61
Two-party-preferred result
Liberal	Phil Barresi	40,233	51.93	−0.55
Labor	Peter Bertolus	37,236	48.07	+0.55
Liberal hold		Swing	−0.55	

=== Dunkley ===
1998 Australian federal election: Dunkley
Party	Candidate	Votes	%	±%
Liberal	Bruce Billson	35,297	46.24	−2.18
Labor	Michael Quayle	29,755	38.98	−1.12
Democrats	Tony Seals	4,392	5.75	−1.25
One Nation	Robyn Brown	3,399	4.45	+4.45
Greens	Henry Kelsall	2,971	3.89	+1.47
Unity	Jan Chapman Davis	335	0.44	+0.44
Natural Law	Ben Mason	185	0.24	−0.29
Total formal votes		76,334	97.12	−0.39
Informal votes		2,264	2.88	+0.39
Turnout		78,598	96.03	−0.39
Two-party-preferred result
Liberal	Bruce Billson	39,721	52.04	−1.32
Labor	Michael Quayle	36,613	47.96	+1.32
Liberal hold		Swing	−1.32	

=== Flinders ===
1998 Australian federal election: Flinders
Party	Candidate	Votes	%	±%
Liberal	Peter Reith	36,570	47.39	−6.31
Labor	John Armitage	28,874	37.42	+4.20
Democrats	David Allison	4,923	6.38	−1.08
One Nation	Robert Langley	4,029	5.22	+5.22
Greens	Mervyn Vogt	2,057	2.67	−1.39
Unity	Tony Kamps	451	0.58	+0.58
Natural Law	Jan Charlwood	264	0.34	−0.14
Total formal votes		77,168	96.85	−0.30
Informal votes		2,511	3.15	+0.30
Turnout		79,679	96.26	−0.14
Two-party-preferred result
Liberal	Peter Reith	41,457	53.72	−6.34
Labor	John Armitage	35,711	46.28	+6.34
Liberal hold		Swing	−6.34	

=== Gellibrand ===
1998 Australian federal election: Gellibrand
Party	Candidate	Votes	%	±%
Labor	Nicola Roxon	51,443	67.47	+4.02
Liberal	Anthony Cursio	15,233	19.98	−1.81
Democrats	David Wark	3,420	4.49	−0.82
One Nation	Nikolas Kavalenka	2,638	3.46	+3.46
Greens	Liz Ingham	2,180	2.86	−0.44
Unity	Adrian Shorland	1,078	1.41	+1.41
Natural Law	Michael Pollock	249	0.33	−0.09
Total formal votes		76,241	95.78	+1.21
Informal votes		3,360	4.22	−1.21
Turnout		79,601	93.75	−0.61
Two-party-preferred result
Labor	Nicola Roxon	57,875	75.91	+4.68
Liberal	Anthony Cursio	18,366	24.09	−4.68
Labor hold		Swing	+4.68	

=== Gippsland ===
1998 Australian federal election: Gippsland
Party	Candidate	Votes	%	±%
National	Peter McGauran	31,774	42.97	−18.24
Labor	Judith Stone	19,438	26.28	+0.30
One Nation	Tony Peters	8,454	11.43	+11.43
Independent	Doug Treasure	4,076	5.51	+5.51
Democrats	Jo McCubbin	3,931	5.32	−2.09
Independent	Leonie Cameron	2,611	3.53	+3.53
Independent	Jack Vanderland	900	1.22	+1.22
Independent	Les Horsfield	799	1.08	+1.08
Natural Law	Frances Clarke	751	1.02	+0.36
Australia First	John Weatherhead	650	0.88	+0.88
Unity	Robert Thorpe	567	0.77	+0.77
Total formal votes		73,951	95.08	−2.37
Informal votes		3,829	4.92	+2.37
Turnout		77,780	95.98	−0.92
Two-party-preferred result
National	Peter McGauran	43,506	58.83	−9.81
Labor	Judith Stone	30,445	41.17	+9.81
National hold		Swing	−9.81	

=== Goldstein ===
1998 Australian federal election: Goldstein
Party	Candidate	Votes	%	±%
Liberal	David Kemp	41,881	52.04	−3.23
Labor	Margaret Khouri	26,980	33.53	+1.44
Democrats	Diane Barry	6,156	7.65	−0.68
Greens	Nick Brunton	2,328	2.89	−0.90
One Nation	Peter Crawford	1,822	2.26	+2.26
Unity	Arkady Shtrambrandt	672	0.84	+0.84
Abolish Child Support	Meret Field	413	0.51	+0.51
Natural Law	Joan Dickins	225	0.28	−0.25
Total formal votes		80,477	97.29	−0.43
Informal votes		2,242	2.71	+0.43
Turnout		82,719	94.94	−0.72
Two-party-preferred result
Liberal	David Kemp	46,801	58.15	−2.79
Labor	Margaret Khouri	33,676	41.85	+2.79
Liberal hold		Swing	−2.79	

=== Higgins ===
1998 Australian federal election: Higgins
Party	Candidate	Votes	%	±%
Liberal	Peter Costello	41,353	53.44	−2.36
Labor	Jude Wallace	24,852	32.12	+1.60
Democrats	Craig Shaw	5,770	7.46	−1.68
Greens	Robert Trafficante	2,155	2.78	−1.13
One Nation	Rod Spencer	1,208	1.56	+1.56
Unity	David Zyngier	1,031	1.33	+1.33
Independent	Ian Lawson	584	0.75	+0.75
Natural Law	Michael Dickins	205	0.26	−0.37
Independent	Russell Dwyer	128	0.17	+0.17
Abolish Child Support	President Torney	93	0.12	+0.12
Total formal votes		77,379	96.99	−0.99
Informal votes		2,403	3.01	+0.99
Turnout		79,782	94.08	−0.95
Two-party-preferred result
Liberal	Peter Costello	46,133	59.62	−1.11
Labor	Jude Wallace	31,246	40.38	+1.11
Liberal hold		Swing	−1.11	

=== Holt ===
1998 Australian federal election: Holt
Party	Candidate	Votes	%	±%
Labor	Gareth Evans	44,172	59.78	+4.60
Liberal	Margaret Nicholls	21,823	29.54	−2.51
Democrats	Daniel Berk	4,425	5.99	−1.30
Christian Democrats	Lynne Dickson	1,296	1.75	+1.75
Unity	Kunwar Raj Singh	931	1.26	+1.26
Independent	Robert Bisset	860	1.16	+1.16
Natural Law	Heath Allison	379	0.51	−0.08
Total formal votes		73,886	95.47	+0.01
Informal votes		3,503	4.53	−0.01
Turnout		77,389	95.21	−0.47
Two-party-preferred result
Labor	Gareth Evans	48,109	65.11	+2.30
Liberal	Margaret Nicholls	25,777	34.89	−2.30
Labor hold		Swing	+2.30	

=== Hotham ===
1998 Australian federal election: Hotham
Party	Candidate	Votes	%	±%
Labor	Simon Crean	46,107	56.98	+1.95
Liberal	John Pesutto	26,059	32.21	−3.71
Democrats	Polly Morgan	3,720	4.60	−0.72
One Nation	Alan Salter	2,559	3.16	+3.16
Greens	Susan Walters	1,492	1.84	−0.04
Unity	Stan Rosenthal	841	1.04	+1.04
Natural Law	John Cordon	137	0.17	−0.21
Total formal votes		80,915	96.36	−0.66
Informal votes		3,058	3.64	+0.66
Turnout		83,973	95.29	−0.56
Two-party-preferred result
Labor	Simon Crean	51,451	63.59	+3.03
Liberal	John Pesutto	29,464	36.41	−3.03
Labor hold		Swing	+3.03	

=== Indi ===
1998 Australian federal election: Indi
Party	Candidate	Votes	%	±%
Liberal	Lou Lieberman	38,590	50.87	−11.73
Labor	Zuvele Leschen	21,572	28.43	+0.40
One Nation	John Anderson	6,023	7.94	+7.94
Democrats	Kevin Smith	3,708	4.89	−2.91
Australia First	Brian Robson	2,157	2.84	+2.84
Greens	Tim Bardsley	1,825	2.41	+2.41
Natural Law	Susan Griffith	738	0.97	−0.61
Independent	Norm Ryan	454	0.60	+0.60
Independent	David Maroney	431	0.57	+0.57
Independent	Jurek Paz	368	0.49	+0.49
Total formal votes		75,866	96.12	−1.57
Informal votes		3,061	3.88	+1.57
Turnout		78,927	96.18	+0.25
Two-party-preferred result
Liberal	Lou Lieberman	45,600	60.11	−7.69
Labor	Zuvele Leschen	30,266	39.89	+7.69
Liberal hold		Swing	−7.69	

=== Isaacs ===
1998 Australian federal election: Isaacs
Party	Candidate	Votes	%	±%
Labor	Greg Wilton	35,604	48.43	+4.38
Liberal	Mike Rawlinson	28,060	38.17	−3.89
Democrats	Robert Ryan	4,355	5.92	−3.65
One Nation	Denis Reed-Smith	2,971	4.04	+4.04
Greens	Daniel Tirawa	1,570	2.14	+2.14
Unity	Mija Carkeek	421	0.57	+0.57
Australia First	Patricia Brook	325	0.44	+0.44
Natural Law	Amanda McIntosh	211	0.29	−0.56
Total formal votes		73,517	96.39	−0.82
Informal votes		2,754	3.61	+0.82
Turnout		76,271	96.21	+0.00
Two-party-preferred result
Labor	Greg Wilton	41,467	56.40	+4.84
Liberal	Mike Rawlinson	32,050	43.60	−4.84
Labor hold		Swing	+4.84	

=== Jagajaga ===
1998 Australian federal election: Jagajaga
Party	Candidate	Votes	%	±%
Labor	Jenny Macklin	38,842	48.15	+3.99
Liberal	Tony Raunic	31,760	39.37	−3.34
Democrats	John McPherson	4,732	5.87	−1.07
Greens	Robyn Roberts	2,633	3.26	−0.03
One Nation	Ray Mason	1,971	2.44	+2.44
Unity	Grant Walters	468	0.58	+0.58
Natural Law	Steve Griffith	265	0.33	+0.01
Total formal votes		80,671	97.42	−0.01
Informal votes		2,137	2.58	+0.01
Turnout		82,808	96.11	−0.78
Two-party-preferred result
Labor	Jenny Macklin	45,100	55.91	+3.20
Liberal	Tony Raunic	35,571	44.09	−3.20
Labor hold		Swing	+3.20	

=== Kooyong ===
1998 Australian federal election: Kooyong
Party	Candidate	Votes	%	±%
Liberal	Petro Georgiou	43,028	54.83	−2.18
Labor	Maxine Morand	23,107	29.44	+2.16
Democrats	Brad Starkie	6,366	8.11	−0.17
Greens	Wendy Salter	3,177	4.05	−0.96
One Nation	Ron McKean	1,637	2.09	+2.09
Unity	Milton Nomikoudis	1,164	1.48	+1.48
Total formal votes		78,479	97.98	−0.03
Informal votes		1,620	2.02	+0.03
Turnout		80,099	95.28	−1.11
Two-party-preferred result
Liberal	Petro Georgiou	48,176	61.39	−2.42
Labor	Maxine Morand	30,303	38.61	+2.42
Liberal hold		Swing	−2.42	

=== La Trobe ===
1998 Australian federal election: La Trobe
Party	Candidate	Votes	%	±%
Liberal	Bob Charles	31,456	42.84	−1.62
Labor	Carolyn Hirsh	27,733	37.77	−1.06
Democrats	Amanda Leeper	6,447	8.78	−0.67
One Nation	Jeff Thomas	3,173	4.32	+4.32
Greens	Robyn Holtham	2,801	3.81	−0.90
Christian Democrats	Wolf Voigt	740	1.01	−0.25
Unity	Assyl Haidar	411	0.56	+0.56
Independent	Frank Dean	331	0.45	−0.33
Abolish Child Support	Graham Woolley	186	0.25	+0.25
Natural Law	Andrew Stenberg	152	0.21	−0.31
Total formal votes		73,430	96.39	−1.08
Informal votes		2,751	3.61	+1.08
Turnout		76,181	96.10	−0.36
Two-party-preferred result
Liberal	Bob Charles	37,442	50.99	−0.38
Labor	Carolyn Hirsh	35,988	49.01	+0.38
Liberal hold		Swing	−0.38	

=== Lalor ===
1998 Australian federal election: Lalor
Party	Candidate	Votes	%	±%
Labor	Julia Gillard	46,374	61.21	−0.63
Liberal	Cameron O'Sullivan	19,381	25.58	−2.54
Democrats	Anthony Shaw	4,090	5.40	−2.36
One Nation	John Brodel	3,127	4.13	+4.13
Unity	George Papaellinas	1,446	1.91	+1.91
Greens	Cynthia Mason	1,339	1.77	+1.77
Total formal votes		75,757	96.63	+0.03
Informal votes		2,638	3.37	−0.03
Turnout		78,395	96.43	+0.10
Two-party-preferred result
Labor	Julia Gillard	52,893	69.82	+1.31
Liberal	Cameron O'Sullivan	22,864	30.18	−1.31
Labor hold		Swing	+1.31	

=== Mallee ===
1998 Australian federal election: Mallee
Party	Candidate	Votes	%	±%
National	John Forrest	43,132	57.18	−12.27
Labor	John Zigouras	16,471	21.83	−1.68
One Nation	Bill Croft	9,516	12.61	+12.61
Democrats	Tom Joyce	3,440	4.56	−1.30
Independent	Lionel McKenzie	2,278	3.02	+3.02
Citizens Electoral Council	Lee Cubit	600	0.80	+0.80
Total formal votes		75,437	97.09	−0.31
Informal votes		2,260	2.91	+0.31
Turnout		77,697	96.13	−0.59
Two-party-preferred result
National	John Forrest	52,328	69.37	−4.13
Labor	John Zigouras	23,109	30.63	+4.13
National hold		Swing	−4.13	

=== Maribyrnong ===
1998 Australian federal election: Maribyrnong
Party	Candidate	Votes	%	±%
Labor	Bob Sercombe	48,458	64.66	+1.96
Liberal	Will Charlton	18,305	24.43	−2.90
Democrats	Helen Martin	3,469	4.63	−0.36
Greens	Tony Camilleri	1,867	2.49	+2.49
Citizens Electoral Council	Paul Gallagher	1,366	1.82	+1.82
Unity	Diana Kalantzis	1,203	1.61	+1.61
Natural Law	Paul Treacy	273	0.36	−0.30
Total formal votes		74,941	95.53	+0.12
Informal votes		3,508	4.47	−0.12
Turnout		78,449	95.43	−0.55
Two-party-preferred result
Labor	Bob Sercombe	53,999	72.06	+3.20
Liberal	Will Charlton	20,942	27.94	−3.20
Labor hold		Swing	+3.20	

=== McEwen ===
1998 Australian federal election: McEwen
Party	Candidate	Votes	%	±%
Liberal	Fran Bailey	32,951	43.46	−2.67
Labor	Graeme McEwen	30,350	40.03	+0.93
One Nation	Dennis Lacey	3,877	5.11	+5.11
Democrats	Sean Carter	3,652	4.82	−1.45
Greens	Pam Lawson	2,020	2.66	−1.24
Shooters	Vicki Treble	1,808	2.38	+2.38
Independent	Stephen Bowden	611	0.81	+0.81
Independent	Elizabeth Savage Kooroonya	363	0.48	+0.48
Natural Law	Susan Brown	186	0.25	−0.15
Total formal votes		75,818	96.66	−0.80
Informal votes		2,623	3.34	+0.80
Turnout		78,441	96.17	−0.56
Two-party-preferred result
Liberal	Fran Bailey	38,699	51.04	−1.13
Labor	Graeme McEwen	37,119	48.96	+1.13
Liberal hold		Swing	−1.13	

=== McMillan ===
1998 Australian federal election: McMillan
Party	Candidate	Votes	%	±%
Liberal	Russell Broadbent	29,512	38.91	−1.20
Labor	Christian Zahra	27,995	36.91	−3.95
One Nation	Bryan Atkin	3,963	5.22	+5.22
Independent	Barry Cunningham	3,800	5.01	+5.01
Democrats	David Wall	3,228	4.26	−0.81
Shooters	Peter Kelly	2,954	3.89	+3.89
Australia First	Peter Wells	2,036	2.68	+2.68
Greens	Jenny Farrar	1,645	2.17	−0.50
Independent	Anthony Geoghegan	352	0.46	+0.46
Unity	Colin Milne	247	0.33	+0.33
Natural Law	Peter Jackson	116	0.15	−0.07
Total formal votes		75,848	95.89	−1.40
Informal votes		3,251	4.11	+1.40
Turnout		79,099	96.53	−0.31
Two-party-preferred result
Labor	Christian Zahra	38,360	50.57	+2.64
Liberal	Russell Broadbent	37,488	49.43	−2.64
Labor gain from Liberal		Swing	+2.64	

=== Melbourne ===
1998 Australian federal election: Melbourne
Party	Candidate	Votes	%	±%
Labor	Lindsay Tanner	45,958	57.90	+0.17
Liberal	Paul Nettelbeck	19,289	24.30	+0.21
Democrats	Brent McKenna	7,122	8.97	+0.31
Greens	Nolan Tyrrell	4,811	6.06	−0.58
Unity	Sherridan Maxwell	1,095	1.38	+1.38
Democratic Socialist	Maurice Sibelle	425	0.54	+0.54
Imperial British	James Ferrari	365	0.46	−0.10
Natural Law	Lawrence Clarke	176	0.22	−0.22
Citizens Electoral Council	Ivan Horvat	133	0.17	+0.17
Total formal votes		79,374	96.34	−0.30
Informal votes		3,018	3.66	+0.30
Turnout		82,392	92.79	+0.46
Two-party-preferred result
Labor	Lindsay Tanner	56,991	71.80	+1.59
Liberal	Paul Nettelbeck	22,383	28.20	−1.59
Labor hold		Swing	+1.59	

=== Melbourne Ports ===
1998 Australian federal election: Melbourne Ports
Party	Candidate	Votes	%	±%
Labor	Michael Danby	32,849	44.10	−2.47
Liberal	Fiona Snedden	29,037	38.99	−0.74
Democrats	Julie Peters	6,099	8.19	+1.10
Greens	Dinesh Mathew	3,523	4.73	−0.43
Unity	Diana Wolowski	1,413	1.90	+1.90
One Nation	Arthur Hawley	1,380	1.85	+1.85
Natural Law	Tom Haynes	180	0.24	−0.25
Total formal votes		74,481	96.89	−0.35
Informal votes		2,390	3.11	+0.35
Turnout		76,871	92.34	−1.10
Two-party-preferred result
Labor	Michael Danby	41,585	55.83	−0.22
Liberal	Fiona Snedden	32,896	44.17	+0.22
Labor hold		Swing	−0.22	

=== Menzies ===
1998 Australian federal election: Menzies
Party	Candidate	Votes	%	±%
Liberal	Kevin Andrews	35,415	46.89	−8.63
Labor	Peter Allan	24,812	32.85	−1.02
Independent	Philip Nitschke	6,843	9.06	+9.06
Democrats	Damian Wise	4,395	5.82	−3.02
One Nation	John Casley	1,383	1.83	+1.83
Unity	Mohamed Morsy	1,383	1.83	+1.83
Independent	Marcia Riordan	1,060	1.40	+1.40
Natural Law	Mark Bunn	240	0.32	−1.46
Total formal votes		75,531	96.82	−0.71
Informal votes		2,480	3.18	+0.71
Turnout		78,011	95.79	−0.85
Two-party-preferred result
Liberal	Kevin Andrews	41,844	55.40	−5.59
Labor	Peter Allan	33,687	44.60	+5.59
Liberal hold		Swing	−5.59	

=== Murray ===
1998 Australian federal election: Murray
Party	Candidate	Votes	%	±%
Liberal	Sharman Stone	46,070	59.43	+16.20
Labor	John Stuart	16,061	20.72	−0.70
Shooters	Geoff Wilson	5,274	6.80	+6.80
One Nation	Robert Hellemons	5,259	6.78	+6.78
Democrats	Ray Cadmore	2,276	2.94	−2.12
Greens	Eleisha Mullane	1,243	1.60	+1.60
Australia First	Diane Teasdale	955	1.23	+1.23
Independent	Nino Marcucci	386	0.50	+0.50
Total formal votes		77,524	96.58	−0.75
Informal votes		2,742	3.42	+0.75
Turnout		80,266	96.05	−0.86
Two-party-preferred result
Liberal	Sharman Stone	55,866	72.06	+18.36
Labor	John Stuart	21,658	27.94	+27.94
Liberal hold		Swing	+18.36	

=== Scullin ===
1998 Australian federal election: Scullin
Party	Candidate	Votes	%	±%
Labor	Harry Jenkins	52,320	67.72	+4.44
Liberal	Peter Pratt	18,882	24.44	+0.17
Democrats	Hussein Tahiri	4,503	5.83	−2.90
Unity	M. Kheirallah	949	1.23	+1.23
Natural Law	Robert Brown	603	0.78	−0.90
Total formal votes		77,257	96.53	+0.07
Informal votes		2,777	3.47	−0.07
Turnout		80,034	96.18	−0.48
Two-party-preferred result
Labor	Harry Jenkins	55,500	71.84	+1.10
Liberal	Peter Pratt	21,757	28.16	−1.10
Labor hold		Swing	+1.10	

=== Wannon ===
1998 Australian federal election: Wannon
Party	Candidate	Votes	%	±%
Liberal	David Hawker	37,570	49.07	−8.43
Labor	Mia Vitue	23,897	31.21	−2.21
One Nation	Simon Edge	5,889	7.69	+7.69
Democrats	Maggie Lindop	4,957	6.47	−2.60
Reform	Leigh McDonald	2,427	3.17	+3.17
Independent	Robert O'Brien	1,824	2.38	+2.38
Total formal votes		76,564	97.24	−0.76
Informal votes		2,170	2.76	+0.76
Turnout		78,734	96.79	−0.72
Two-party-preferred result
Liberal	David Hawker	43,981	57.44	−4.87
Labor	Mia Vitue	32,583	42.56	+4.87
Liberal hold		Swing	−4.87	

=== Wills ===
1998 Australian federal election: Wills
Party	Candidate	Votes	%	±%
Labor	Kelvin Thomson	50,507	63.96	+13.98
Liberal	David Curry	20,280	25.68	+4.45
Democrats	Robert Stone	4,507	5.71	+2.11
Progressive Labour	Bill Deller	1,875	2.37	+2.37
Unity	Randa Abdel-Fattah	1,363	1.73	+1.73
Citizens Electoral Council	Andrew Fox	435	0.55	+0.55
Total formal votes		78,967	95.73	−0.62
Informal votes		3,520	4.27	+0.62
Turnout		82,487	94.55	−0.44
Two-party-preferred result
Labor	Kelvin Thomson	56,033	70.96	+15.19
Liberal	David Curry	22,934	29.04	+29.04
Labor hold		Swing	+15.19	

== See also ==
- Results of the 1998 Australian federal election (House of Representatives)
- Members of the Australian House of Representatives, 1998–2001
