= Results of the 1996 Australian federal election in Victoria =

1996 Australian federal election (Victoria)
- 2 March 1996

All 37 Victoria seats in the Australian House of Representatives and 6 seats in the Australian Senate
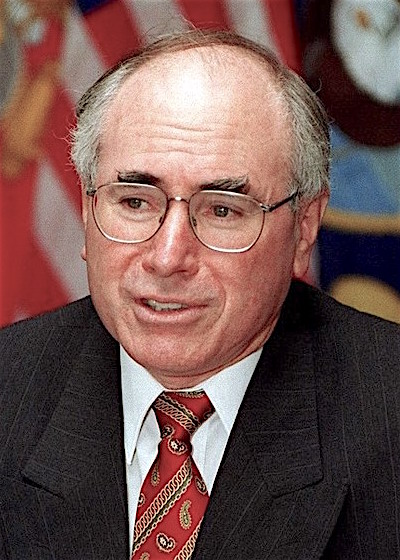

	First party	Second party
Leader	John Howard	Paul Keating
Party	Liberal/National coalition	Labor
Last election	20	17 seats
Seats won	21 seats	16 seats
Seat change	▲1	▼1
Popular vote	1,234,647	1,190,404
Percentage	44.5%	42.9%
Swing	▼0.7	▼3.6
TPP	49.70%	50.30%
TPP swing	▲1.50	▼1.50

This is a list of electoral division results for the Australian 1996 federal election in the state of Victoria.

== Overall results ==
Turnout 96.1% (CV) — Informal 2.9%
Party	Votes	%	Swing	Seats	Change
Liberal	1,106,556	39.90	−0.31	19	▲2
National	128,091	4.62	−0.39	2	▼1
Liberal/National Coalition	1,234,647	44.52	−0.70	21	▲1
Labor	1,190,404	42.92	−3.53	16	▼1
Democrats	203,902	7.35	3.66		
Greens	52,812	1.90	1.78		
Independent	45,243	1.63	−1.13		▼1
Natural Law	20,988	0.76	−0.39		
AAFI	16,914	0.61	0.54		
Call to Australia	8,081	0.29	−0.19		
Pensioner and CIR	332	0.00	0.01		
Total	2,773,323			37	▼1
Two-party-preferred vote
Labor	1,388,142	50.30	-1.50	16	▼1
Liberal/National Coalition	1,371,480	49.70	1.50	21	▲1
Invalid/blank votes	83,615	2.93			
Turnout	2,856,936	96.11			
Registered voters	2,972,635				
Source: Federal Elections 1996

== Results by division ==
=== Aston ===
1996 Australian federal election: Aston
Party	Candidate	Votes	%	±%
Liberal	Peter Nugent	39,027	51.59	+1.50
Labor	Michael Hailey	29,266	38.69	−4.61
Democrats	Damian Wise	6,739	8.91	+5.02
Natural Law	James McCarron	611	0.81	−0.04
Total formal votes		75,643	97.60	+0.16
Informal votes		1,862	2.40	−0.16
Turnout		77,505	97.02	+0.12
Two-party-preferred result
Liberal	Peter Nugent	41,909	55.59	+3.02
Labor	Michael Hailey	33,485	44.41	−3.02
Liberal hold		Swing	+3.02	

=== Ballarat ===
1996 Australian federal election: Ballarat
Party	Candidate	Votes	%	±%
Liberal	Michael Ronaldson	37,275	49.01	+1.89
Labor	Jenny Beacham	31,864	41.89	−1.77
Democrats	Trish Finlay	3,208	4.22	+1.93
Call to Australia	David Cocking	1,781	2.34	−1.26
Independent	Alan Gray	947	1.25	+1.25
AAFI	John Neenan	801	1.05	+1.05
Natural Law	Alan McDonald	186	0.24	−0.81
Total formal votes		76,062	97.89	+0.17
Informal votes		1,641	2.11	−0.17
Turnout		77,703	96.82	−0.30
Two-party-preferred result
Liberal	Michael Ronaldson	40,696	53.67	+2.09
Labor	Jenny Beacham	35,129	46.33	−2.09
Liberal hold		Swing	+2.09	

=== Batman ===
1996 Australian federal election: Batman
Party	Candidate	Votes	%	±%
Labor	Martin Ferguson	45,491	58.82	−8.73
Liberal	Wayne Youlten	16,574	21.43	−2.94
Democrats	Julie Peters	4,655	6.02	+2.58
Independent	Irene Bolger	3,976	5.14	+5.14
Greens	Frank Ryan	2,791	3.61	+3.61
Natural Law	Paul D'Angelo	2,165	2.80	+1.86
Independent	George Koumantatakis	1,083	1.40	+1.40
Independent	Arthur Preketes	601	0.78	+0.78
Total formal votes		77,336	94.92	−0.65
Informal votes		3,976	5.14	+0.65
Turnout		81,479	95.23	+0.22
Two-party-preferred result
Labor	Martin Ferguson	54,637	71.31	−3.01
Liberal	Wayne Youlten	21,979	28.69	+3.01
Labor hold		Swing	−3.01	

=== Bendigo ===
1996 Australian federal election: Bendigo
Party	Candidate	Votes	%	±%
Liberal	Bruce Reid	34,703	44.75	+0.08
Labor	Joe Helper	33,206	42.82	−4.23
Democrats	Don Semmens	4,371	5.64	+2.43
Greens	Doug Ralph	2,534	3.27	+3.27
Call to Australia	Pamela Taylor	1,483	1.91	−0.18
AAFI	John Bulbrook	1,019	1.31	+1.31
Natural Law	Susan Griffith	233	0.30	−0.27
Total formal votes		77,549	97.95	+0.13
Informal votes		1,619	2.05	−0.13
Turnout		79,168	96.93	−0.20
Two-party-preferred result
Liberal	Bruce Reid	39,298	50.88	+2.23
Labor	Joe Helper	37,938	49.12	−2.23
Liberal hold		Swing	+2.23	

=== Bruce ===
1996 Australian federal election: Bruce
Party	Candidate	Votes	%	±%
Labor	Alan Griffin	36,104	45.82	−1.50
Liberal	Julian Beale	35,954	45.63	−0.70
Democrats	Daryl Burkett	4,805	6.10	+1.65
Greens	Armen Bahlaw	1,586	2.01	+2.01
Natural Law	Michael Soos	343	0.44	−0.50
Total formal votes		78,792	97.04	+0.13
Informal votes		2,405	2.96	−0.13
Turnout		81,197	96.45	−0.78
Two-party-preferred result
Labor	Alan Griffin	39,864	50.76	−0.77
Liberal	Julian Beale	38,669	49.24	+0.77
Labor notional hold		Swing	−0.77	

=== Burke ===
1996 Australian federal election: Burke
Party	Candidate	Votes	%	±%
Labor	Neil O'Keefe	35,949	50.95	−1.93
Liberal	Anthony Moore	27,122	38.44	−1.41
Democrats	Victor Kaye	6,782	9.61	+5.08
Natural Law	Michael Dickins	705	1.00	+0.28
Total formal votes		70,558	97.04	−0.40
Informal votes		2,155	2.96	+0.40
Turnout		72,713	96.21	−0.22
Two-party-preferred result
Labor	Neil O'Keefe	40,069	57.03	−0.69
Liberal	Anthony Moore	30,191	42.97	+0.69
Labor hold		Swing	−0.69	

=== Calwell ===
1996 Australian federal election: Calwell
Party	Candidate	Votes	%	±%
Labor	Andrew Theophanous	43,986	61.33	−1.55
Liberal	Bill Willis	20,679	28.83	−0.83
Democrats	Robert Livesay	4,975	6.94	+4.04
	Sue Phillips	1,554	2.17	+2.17
Natural Law	Richard Barnes	522	0.73	+0.13
Total formal votes		71,716	96.24	−0.23
Informal votes		2,800	3.76	+0.23
Turnout		74,516	95.63	−0.46
Two-party-preferred result
Labor	Andrew Theophanous	48,067	67.19	+0.08
Liberal	Bill Willis	23,467	32.81	−0.08
Labor hold		Swing	+0.08	

=== Casey ===
1996 Australian federal election: Casey
Party	Candidate	Votes	%	±%
Liberal	Bob Halverson	35,943	50.03	−0.39
Labor	Des Burns	25,722	35.80	−4.97
Democrats	Glen Maddock	7,140	9.94	+4.58
Greens	Chanel Keane	2,360	3.28	+3.28
Natural Law	Robert Kendi	350	0.49	−0.75
Pensioner and CIR	Basil Smith	332	0.46	+0.46
Total formal votes		71,847	97.24	−0.25
Informal votes		2,037	2.76	+0.25
Turnout		73,884	96.66	−0.06
Two-party-preferred result
Liberal	Bob Halverson	40,479	56.65	+2.49
Labor	Des Burns	30,981	43.35	−2.49
Liberal hold		Swing	+2.49	

=== Chisholm ===
1996 Australian federal election: Chisholm
Party	Candidate	Votes	%	±%
Liberal	Michael Wooldridge	37,110	47.13	−0.64
Labor	Tony Robinson	31,807	40.39	−4.21
Democrats	Matthew Townsend	5,725	7.27	+1.34
Greens	Adrian Whitehead	2,097	2.66	+2.66
AAFI	Peter Judge	1,291	1.64	+1.64
Natural Law	Graeme Browne	358	0.47	−0.95
	Mark Ilott	350	0.44	+0.44
Total formal votes		78,748	97.44	−0.01
Informal votes		2,069	2.56	+0.01
Turnout		80,817	96.18	−0.13
Two-party-preferred result
Liberal	Michael Wooldridge	41,190	52.59	+2.20
Labor	Tony Robinson	37,132	47.41	−2.20
Liberal hold		Swing	+2.20	

=== Corangamite ===
1996 Australian federal election: Corangamite
Party	Candidate	Votes	%	±%
Liberal	Stewart McArthur	38,445	52.66	+0.18
Labor	Bernie Eades	26,179	35.86	−1.80
Democrats	Pamela Johnson	8,382	11.48	+8.22
Total formal votes		73,006	97.78	+0.22
Informal votes		1,655	2.22	−0.22
Turnout		74,661	96.70	−0.08
Two-party-preferred result
Liberal	Stewart McArthur	41,939	57.69	+1.73
Labor	Bernie Eades	30,761	42.31	−1.73
Liberal hold		Swing	+1.73	

=== Corio ===
1996 Australian federal election: Corio
Party	Candidate	Votes	%	±%
Labor	Gavan O'Connor	38,656	50.76	−3.54
Liberal	Srechko Kontelj	30142	39.58	+1.87
Democrats	Gerald Desmarais	5,919	7.77	+3.08
Natural Law	Robert Nieuwenhuis	1,443	1.89	+1.25
Total formal votes		76,160	96.67	−0.11
Informal votes		2,378	3.03	+0.11
Turnout		78,538	96.68	+0.20
Two-party-preferred result
Labor	Gavan O'Connor	43,112	56.80	−2.03
Liberal	Srechko Kontelj	32,788	43.20	+2.03
Labor hold		Swing	−2.03	

=== Deakin ===
1996 Australian federal election: Deakin
Party	Candidate	Votes	%	±%
Liberal	Phil Barresi	34,292	44.72	−2.63
Labor	Kerrin Buckney	29,639	38.65	−4.99
Democrats	John Siddons	6,801	8.87	+3.87
Greens	Kathy Lothian	1,870	2.44	+2.44
Call to Australia	Murray Graham	1,495	1.95	+0.56
AAFI	Paul Coelli	1,226	1.60	+1.60
Natural Law	Maggie Lawrence	730	0.95	−0.53
Independent	David White	429	0.56	+0.56
Independent	Gilbert Boffa	194	0.25	+0.25
Total formal votes		76,676	97.13	−0.20
Informal votes		2,262	2.87	+0.20
Turnout		78,938	96.65	+0.20
Two-party-preferred result
Liberal	Phil Barresi	40,027	52.48	+1.89
Labor	Kerrin Buckney	36,244	47.52	−1.89
Liberal hold		Swing	+1.89	

=== Dunkley ===
1996 Australian federal election: Dunkley
Party	Candidate	Votes	%	±%
Liberal	Bruce Billson	36,330	48.42	−1.04
Labor	Bob Chynoweth	30,084	40.10	−3.59
Democrats	Reba Jacobs	5,257	7.01	+3.10
Greens	Paul Higgins	1,817	2.42	+2.42
AAFI	Travis Peak	1,144	1.52	+1.52
Natural Law	Bev Nelson	399	0.53	−2.18
Total formal votes		75,031	97.51	−0.26
Informal votes		1,914	2.49	+0.26
Turnout		76,945	96.42	+0.11
Two-party-preferred result
Liberal	Bruce Billson	39,885	53.36	+1.02
Labor	Bob Chynoweth	34,865	46.64	−1.02
Liberal notional hold		Swing	+1.02	

=== Flinders ===
1996 Australian federal election: Flinders
Party	Candidate	Votes	%	±%
Liberal	Peter Reith	39,503	53.70	+0.32
Labor	Ian Watkinson	24,438	33.22	−6.65
Democrats	Colin Beeforth	5,485	7.46	+3.39
Greens	Ian Ward	2,989	4.06	+4.06
Independent	Ralph Roberts	798	1.08	+1.08
Natural Law	Jan Charlwood	355	0.48	−1.68
Total formal votes		73,568	97.15	−0.40
Informal votes		2,159	2.85	+0.40
Turnout		75,727	96.40	−0.05
Two-party-preferred result
Liberal	Peter Reith	43,994	60.07	+4.36
Labor	Ian Watkinson	29,248	39.93	−4.36
Liberal hold		Swing	+4.36	

=== Gellibrand ===
1996 Australian federal election: Gellibrand
Party	Candidate	Votes	%	±%
Labor	Ralph Willis	46,533	63.45	−5.85
Liberal	John Best	15,978	21.79	−0.88
Democrats	Khiet Nguyen	3,889	5.30	+2.03
Greens	Janet Rice	2,440	3.33	+3.33
Call to Australia	Peter Sanko	1,630	2.22	+1.30
Independent	John Kelly	1,392	1.90	+1.90
AAFI	Luke Spencer	1,166	1.59	+1.59
Natural Law	Marco Andreacchio	306	0.42	−0.44
Total formal votes		73,334	94.57	−1.37
Informal votes		4,214	5.43	+1.37
Turnout		77,548	94.35	−0.70
Two-party-preferred result
Labor	Ralph Willis	51,902	71.23	−4.33
Liberal	John Best	20,965	28.77	+4.33
Labor hold		Swing	−4.33	

=== Gippsland ===
1996 Australian federal election: Gippsland
Party	Candidate	Votes	%	±%
National	Peter McGauran	46,180	61.21	+4.83
Labor	Judith Stone	19,604	25.98	−4.34
Democrats	John Brownstein	5,584	7.40	+4.63
Independent	Ben Buckley	3,582	4.75	+4.83
Natural Law	Jamie Pollock	495	0.66	−0.07
Total formal votes		75,445	97.45	−0.47
Informal votes		1,974	2.55	+0.47
Turnout		77,419	96.90	+0.57
Two-party-preferred result
National	Peter McGauran	51,400	68.64	+2.80
Labor	Judith Stone	23,486	31.36	−2.80
National hold		Swing	+2.80	

=== Goldstein ===
1996 Australian federal election: Goldstein
Party	Candidate	Votes	%	±%
Liberal	David Kemp	44,139	55.27	−0.83
Labor	Kip Calvert	25,623	32.08	−3.96
Democrats	Diane Barry	6,650	8.33	+3.65
Greens	Justin Kennedy	3,029	3.79	+3.79
Natural Law	Robert Johnson	425	0.53	−1.56
Total formal votes		79,864	97.72	+0.20
Informal votes		1,866	2.28	−0.20
Turnout		81,730	95.67	+0.09
Two-party-preferred result
Liberal	David Kemp	48,296	60.94	+1.95
Labor	Kip Calvert	30,956	39.06	−1.95
Liberal hold		Swing	+1.95	

=== Higgins ===
1996 Australian federal election: Higgins
Party	Candidate	Votes	%	±%
Liberal	Peter Costello	42,778	55.80	−0.54
Labor	Ilias Grivas	23,392	30.52	−5.25
Democrats	Nicolle Kuna	7,002	9.13	+3.68
Greens	Mark Nicholls	2,995	3.91	+3.91
Natural Law	Lorna Scurfield	490	0.64	−1.71
Total formal votes		76,657	97.98	+0.52
Informal votes		1,579	2.02	−0.52
Turnout		78,236	95.03	−0.06
Two-party-preferred result
Liberal	Peter Costello	46,188	60.73	+1.44
Labor	Ilias Grivas	29,862	39.27	−1.44
Liberal hold		Swing	+1.44	

=== Holt ===
1996 Australian federal election: Holt
Party	Candidate	Votes	%	±%
Labor	Gareth Evans	37,948	55.19	−2.84
Liberal	Tony Williams	22,036	32.05	−2.61
Democrats	Jim Aubrey	5,009	7.28	+3.98
Independent	George Mitsou	1,683	2.45	+2.45
AAFI	Paul Madigan	1,171	1.70	+1.70
	Liz Mantell	511	0.74	+0.74
Natural Law	Heath Allison	406	0.59	−0.91
Total formal votes		68,764	95.46	−1.15
Informal votes		3,267	4.54	+1.15
Turnout		72,031	95.68	−0.19
Two-party-preferred result
Labor	Gareth Evans	43,078	62.81	+0.37
Liberal	Tony Williams	25,507	37.19	−0.37
Labor hold		Swing	+0.37	

=== Hotham ===
1996 Australian federal election: Hotham
Party	Candidate	Votes	%	±%
Labor	Simon Crean	44,182	55.04	+0.65
Liberal	Brad Maunsell	28,834	35.92	−3.64
Democrats	Brad Starkie	4,271	5.32	+1.98
Greens	Emma Rush	1,511	1.88	+1.88
AAFI	John Casley	1,176	1.46	+1.46
Natural Law	John Cordon	303	0.38	−0.75
Total formal votes		80,277	97.02	+0.02
Informal votes		2,468	2.98	−0.02
Turnout		82,745	95.85	−0.35
Two-party-preferred result
Labor	Simon Crean	48,437	60.56	+1.43
Liberal	Brad Maunsell	31,546	39.44	−1.43
Labor hold		Swing	+1.43	

=== Indi ===
1996 Australian federal election: Indi
Party	Candidate	Votes	%	±%
Liberal	Lou Lieberman	47,097	62.59	+18.33
Labor	Zuvele Leschen	21,091	28.03	−5.92
Democrats	Kevin Smith	5,867	7.80	+7.48
Natural Law	Bruce Lusher	1,190	1.58	−0.25
Total formal votes		75,245	97.69	−0.10
Informal votes		1,778	2.31	+0.10
Turnout		77,023	95.93	−0.30
Two-party-preferred result
Liberal	Lou Lieberman	50,838	67.79	+4.50
Labor	Zuvele Leschen	24,154	32.21	−4.50
Liberal hold		Swing	+4.50	

=== Isaacs ===
1996 Australian federal election: Isaacs
Party	Candidate	Votes	%	±%
Labor	Greg Wilton	30,997	44.05	−4.91
Liberal	Rod Atkinson	29,595	42.06	−1.38
Democrats	Kaylyn Raynor	6,734	9.57	+5.12
AAFI	Angela Walker	2,448	3.48	+3.48
Natural Law	Jan Allison	597	0.85	−1.42
Total formal votes		70,371	97.20	−0.19
Informal votes		2,024	2.80	+0.19
Turnout		72,395	96.21	−0.21
Two-party-preferred result
Labor	Greg Wilton	36,158	51.56	−2.35
Liberal	Rod Atkinson	33,965	48.44	+2.35
Labor notional hold		Swing	−2.35	

=== Jagajaga ===
1996 Australian federal election: Jagajaga
Party	Candidate	Votes	%	±%
Labor	Jenny Macklin	34,977	44.16	−3.40
Liberal	Michelle Penson	33,823	42.71	−0.66
Democrats	Timothy Newhouse	5,496	6.94	+3.59
Greens	Susan Coleman	2,609	3.29	+3.29
AAFI	Paul Tobias	994	1.26	+0.24
Independent	Andrew Mackenzie	839	1.06	+1.06
Natural Law	Byron Rigby	249	0.31	−0.83
Independent	Chris Vassis	214	0.27	−0.75
Total formal votes		79,201	97.43	+0.36
Informal votes		2,089	2.57	−0.36
Turnout		81,290	96.89	+0.11
Two-party-preferred result
Labor	Jenny Macklin	41,550	52.71	−0.59
Liberal	Michelle Penson	37,280	47.29	+0.59
Labor hold		Swing	−0.59	

=== Kooyong ===
1996 Australian federal election: Kooyong
Party	Candidate	Votes	%	±%
Liberal	Petro Georgiou	44,022	57.00	−3.74
Labor	Christina Sindt	21,070	27.28	−3.29
Democrats	Pierre Harcourt	6,392	8.28	+2.66
Greens	Jane Beer	3,870	5.01	+5.01
AAFI	Rod Spencer	1,543	2.00	+2.00
Natural Law	Raymond Schlager	330	0.43	−1.34
Total formal votes		77,227	98.00	+0.47
Informal votes		1,573	2.00	−0.47
Turnout		78,800	96.38	+0.59
Two-party-preferred result
Liberal	Petro Georgiou	48,841	63.81	+0.51
Labor	Christina Sindt	27,699	36.19	−0.51
Liberal hold		Swing	+0.51	

=== La Trobe ===
1996 Australian federal election: La Trobe
Party	Candidate	Votes	%	±%
Liberal	Bob Charles	30,806	44.46	−2.90
Labor	Carolyn Hirsh	26,905	38.83	−3.28
Democrats	John Hastie	6,549	9.45	+5.02
Greens	John Benton	3,264	4.71	+1.04
Call to Australia	Wolf Voigt	874	1.26	+0.12
Independent	Frank Dean	542	0.78	+0.78
Natural Law	Andrew Stenberg	350	0.51	−0.11
Total formal votes		69,290	97.47	−0.16
Informal votes		1,799	2.53	+0.16
Turnout		71,089	96.45	+0.03
Two-party-preferred result
Liberal	Bob Charles	35,396	51.37	+0.10
Labor	Carolyn Hirsh	33,508	48.63	−0.10
Liberal hold		Swing	+0.10	

=== Lalor ===
1996 Australian federal election: Lalor
Party	Candidate	Votes	%	±%
Labor	Barry Jones	43,217	61.85	−3.64
Liberal	Chris Macgregor	19,653	28.12	−0.97
Democrats	Leigh Hebbard	5,423	7.76	+4.83
Natural Law	Juliana Kendi	1,585	2.27	+1.34
Total formal votes		69,878	96.60	−0.10
Informal votes		2,458	3.40	+0.10
Turnout		72,336	96.32	−0.43
Two-party-preferred result
Labor	Barry Jones	47,729	68.51	−0.51
Liberal	Chris Macgregor	21,941	31.49	+0.51
Labor hold		Swing	−0.51	

=== Mallee ===
1996 Australian federal election: Mallee
Party	Candidate	Votes	%	±%
National	John Forrest	52,671	69.45	+33.66
Labor	Col Palmer	17,832	23.51	−3.15
Democrats	Colin Davies	4,447	5.86	+3.39
Natural Law	Andrew Lawson Kerr	890	1.17	+0.36
Total formal votes		75,840	97.40	−0.18
Informal votes		2,025	2.60	+0.18
Turnout		77,865	96.72	−0.29
Two-party-preferred result
National	John Forrest	55,639	73.50	+23.00
Labor	Col Palmer	20,060	26.50	+26.50
National hold		Swing	+23.00	

=== Maribyrnong ===
1996 Australian federal election: Maribyrnong
Party	Candidate	Votes	%	±%
Labor	Bob Sercombe	45,755	62.70	−2.19
Liberal	Georgi Stickels	19,938	27.32	−2.03
Democrats	Peter Rechner	3,644	4.99	+1.69
Independent	Helen van den Berg	2,046	2.80	+2.80
Independent	Brendan Griffin	1,105	1.51	+1.51
Natural Law	Peter Jackson	485	0.66	−0.18
Total formal votes		72,973	95.41	−1.01
Informal votes		3,512	4.59	+1.01
Turnout		76,485	95.98	−0.31
Two-party-preferred result
Labor	Bob Sercombe	50,097	68.85	+0.00
Liberal	Georgi Stickels	22,665	31.15	+0.00
Labor hold		Swing	+0.00	

=== McEwen ===
1996 Australian federal election: McEwen
Party	Candidate	Votes	%	±%
Liberal	Fran Bailey	33,637	46.13	−2.08
Labor	Peter Cleeland	28,516	39.10	−4.36
Democrats	David Zemdegs	4,571	6.27	+1.50
Greens	Chris James	2,843	3.90	+3.90
AAFI	Rick Lloyd	2,235	3.06	+3.05
Independent	Jock Kyme	835	1.15	+1.15
Natural Law	Martin Magee	285	0.39	−0.74
Total formal votes		72,922	97.45	+0.08
Informal votes		1,905	2.55	−0.08
Turnout		74,827	96.74	+0.32
Two-party-preferred result
Liberal	Fran Bailey	37,845	52.18	+1.50
Labor	Peter Cleeland	34,689	47.82	−1.50
Liberal hold		Swing	+1.50	

=== McMillan ===
1996 Australian federal election: McMillan
Party	Candidate	Votes	%	±%
Labor	Barry Cunningham	31,115	40.86	−4.92
Liberal	Russell Broadbent	30,546	40.11	−2.38
National	Helen Hoppner	6,206	8.15	+6.93
Democrats	Colin Thornby	3,869	5.07	+1.66
Greens	Luke van der Meulen	2,031	2.67	+2.67
Independent	Dave Smith	878	1.15	+1.15
Call to Australia	Norman Baker	818	1.07	+1.07
Independent	Chris King	526	0.69	+0.69
Natural Law	Michael Pollock	170	0.22	−0.35
Total formal votes		76,149	97.39	−0.32
Informal votes		2,119	2.71	+0.32
Turnout		78,268	96.83	−0.09
Two-party-preferred result
Liberal	Russell Broadbent	39,333	52.07	+2.60
Labor	Barry Cunningham	36,210	47.93	−2.60
Liberal gain from Labor		Swing	+2.60	

=== Melbourne ===
1996 Australian federal election: Melbourne
Party	Candidate	Votes	%	±%
Labor	Lindsay Tanner	43,189	57.73	−7.99
Liberal	Michael Flynn	18,024	24.09	+0.10
Democrats	Richard Grummet	6,478	8.66	+4.88
Greens	Sarah Nicholson	4,970	6.64	+6.64
Democratic Socialist	Di Quinn	1,395	1.86	-0.81
Imperial British	James Ferrari	421	0.56	+0.02
Natural Law	Larry Clarke	330	0.44	−0.61
Total formal votes		74,807	96.63	+0.31
Informal votes		2,606	3.37	−0.31
Turnout		77,413	92.33	−0.64
Two-party-preferred result
Labor	Lindsay Tanner	51,894	70.21	−3.53
Liberal	Michael Flynn	22,017	29.79	+3.53
Labor hold		Swing	−3.53	

=== Melbourne Ports ===
1996 Australian federal election: Melbourne Ports
Party	Candidate	Votes	%	±%
Labor	Clyde Holding	33,838	46.58	−2.08
Liberal	Margot Foster	28,863	39.73	−2.02
Democrats	John Davey	5,147	7.08	+3.42
Greens	Misha Coleman	3,746	5.16	+5.16
AAFI	Margaret Gillespie-Jones	700	0.96	+0.96
Natural Law	Robert Brown	357	0.49	−0.46
Total formal votes		72,651	97.24	+0.16
Informal votes		2,065	2.76	−0.16
Turnout		74,716	93.44	−0.22
Two-party-preferred result
Labor	Clyde Holding	40,399	56.05	+0.20
Liberal	Margot Foster	31,679	43.95	−0.20
Labor hold		Swing	+0.20	

=== Menzies ===
1996 Australian federal election: Menzies
Party	Candidate	Votes	%	±%
Liberal	Kevin Andrews	41,479	55.52	−2.14
Labor	Peter De Angelis	25,307	33.87	−3.05
Democrats	Angela Carter	6,602	8.84	+4.53
Natural Law	Susan Brown	1,328	1.78	+0.66
Total formal votes		74,716	97.53	+0.27
Informal votes		1,891	2.47	−0.27
Turnout		76,607	96.64	−0.53
Two-party-preferred result
Liberal	Kevin Andrews	45,330	60.99	+1.73
Labor	Peter De Angelis	28,993	39.01	−1.73
Liberal hold		Swing	+1.73	

=== Murray ===
1996 Australian federal election: Murray
Party	Candidate	Votes	%	±%
Liberal	Sharman Stone	33,565	43.22	+42.09
National	John Walker	23,034	29.66	−36.75
Labor	Bernie Moran	16,635	21.42	−5.20
Democrats	Dennis Lacey	3,924	5.05	+2.44
Natural Law	George Rose	497	0.64	−0.42
Total formal votes		77,655	97.33	−0.20
Informal votes		2,130	2.67	+0.20
Turnout		79,785	96.90	−0.05
Two-party-preferred result
Liberal	Sharman Stone	41,531	53.70	+53.70
National	John Walker	35,814	46.30	−24.20
Liberal gain from National		Swing	+53.70	

=== Scullin ===
1996 Australian federal election: Scullin
Party	Candidate	Votes	%	±%
Labor	Harry Jenkins	45,295	63.28	−2.06
Liberal	Marc Morgan	17,373	24.27	−1.28
Democrats	Evan Bekiaris	6,248	8.73	+5.50
Greens	Gurm Sekhon	1,460	2.04	+2.04
Natural Law	Neil Phillips	1,204	1.68	+1.14
Total formal votes		71,580	96.46	+0.38
Informal votes		2,630	3.54	−0.38
Turnout		74,210	96.66	−0.35
Two-party-preferred result
Labor	Harry Jenkins	50,494	70.74	−1.67
Liberal	Marc Morgan	20,888	29.26	+1.67
Labor hold		Swing	−1.67	

=== Wannon ===
1996 Australian federal election: Wannon
Party	Candidate	Votes	%	±%
Liberal	David Hawker	44,695	57.50	+1.55
Labor	Richard Morrow	25,978	33.42	−2.61
Democrats	Maggie Lindop	7,051	9.07	+7.00
Total formal votes		77,724	98.00	+0.54
Informal votes		1,587	2.00	−0.54
Turnout		79,311	97.52	+0.20
Two-party-preferred result
Liberal	David Hawker	48,312	62.31	+2.79
Labor	Richard Morrow	29,222	37.69	−2.79
Liberal hold		Swing	+2.79	

=== Wills ===
1996 Australian federal election: Wills
Party	Candidate	Votes	%	±%
Labor	Kelvin Thomson	39,014	49.98	+4.37
Independent	Phil Cleary	17,747	22.74	−2.73
Liberal	Jack Minas	16,576	21.24	−3.30
Democrats	Robert Stone	2,811	3.60	+1.49
Independent	Sharon Keppel	1,399	1.79	+1.79
Natural Law	Martin Richardson	316	0.40	−0.01
Independent CEC	Craig Isherwood	196	0.25	+0.25
Total formal votes		78,059	96.35	−0.11
Informal votes		2,957	3.65	+0.11
Turnout		81,016	94.99	−0.27
Notional two-party-preferred count
Labor	Kelvin Thomson	56,067	72.21	+12.29
Liberal	Jack Minas	21,574	27.79	−12.29
Two-candidate-preferred result
Labor	Kelvin Thomson	43,394	55.77	+4.10
Independent	Phil Cleary	34,417	44.23	−4.10
Labor gain from Independent		Swing	+4.10	

The division was affected by a redistribution, however it is unclear what effect the new boundaries had on Cleary's margin. The swing compares the margin with the 1993 election without any notional adjustment.

== See also ==
- Results of the 1996 Australian federal election (House of Representatives)
- Members of the Australian House of Representatives, 1996–1998
