= Electoral results for the Division of Burke =

Electoral results for the Division of Burke may refer to:

- Electoral results for the Division of Burke (1949–55)
- Electoral results for the Division of Burke (1969–2004)
