= Results of the 2001 Australian federal election in Victoria =

2001 Australian federal election (Victoria)
← 1998	10 November 2001	2004 →

All 37 Victoria seats in the Australian House of Representatives and 6 seats in the Australian Senate
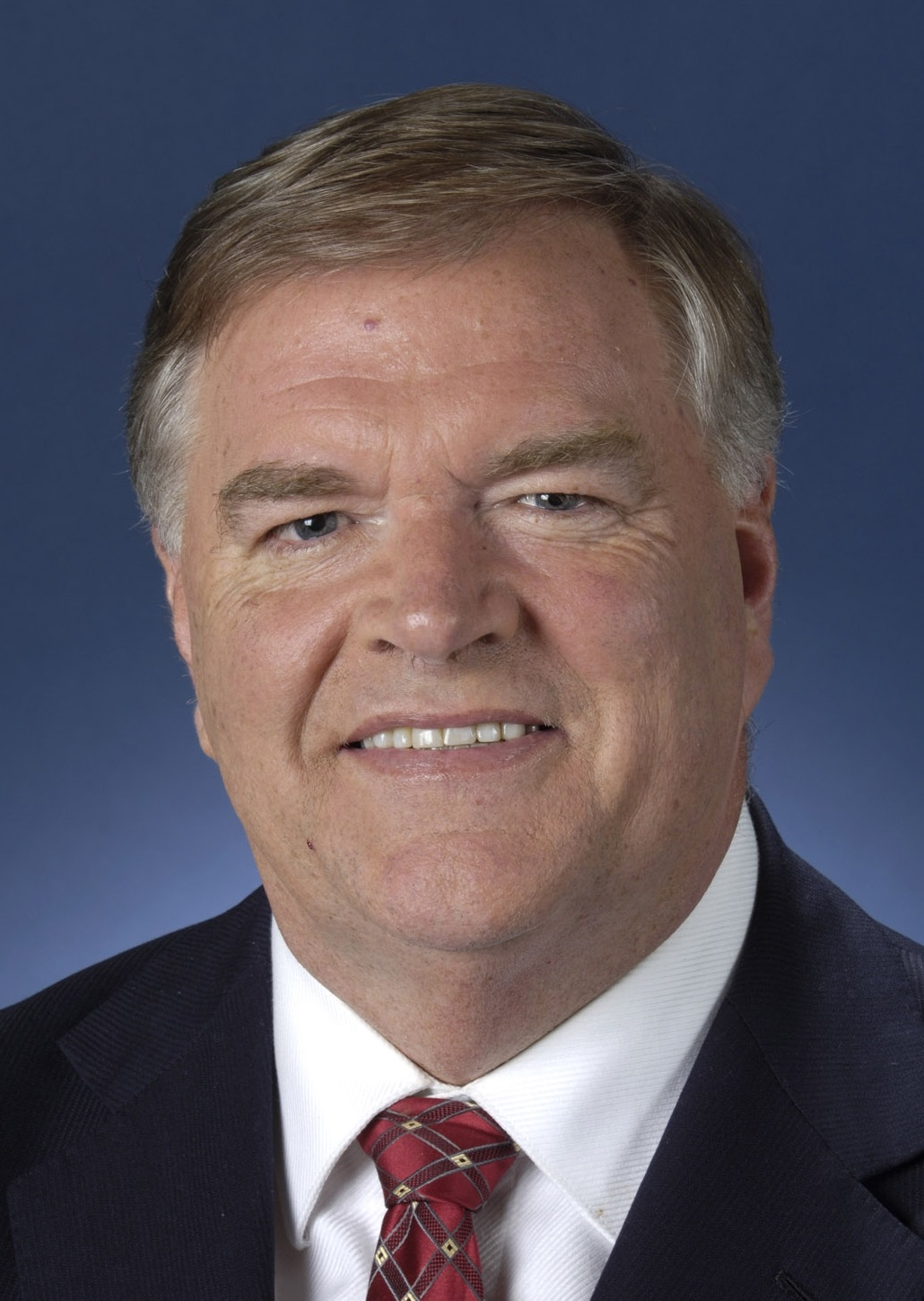

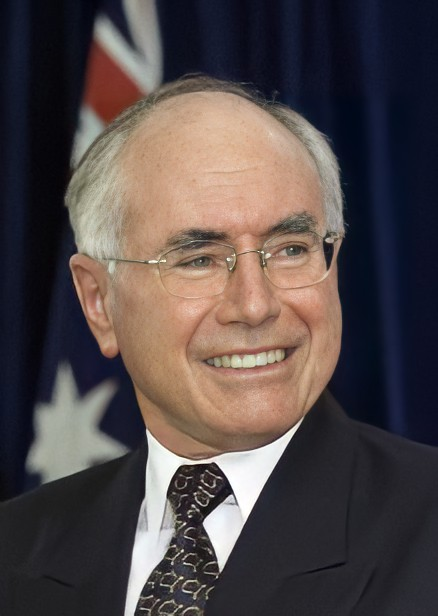
	First party	Second party
Leader	Kim Beazley	John Howard
Party	Labor	Liberal/National coalition
Last election	19 seats	16 seats
Seats won	20 seats	15 seats
Seat change	▲1	▼1
Popular vote	1,230,757	1,245,542
Percentage	41.65%	42.15%
Swing	▼2.72	▲2.35
TPP	53.05%	46.95%
TPP swing	▲1.65	▼1.65

This is a list of electoral division results for the Australian 2001 federal election in the state of Victoria.

== Overall results ==
Turnout 99.60% (CV) — Informal 3.40%
Party	Votes	%	Swing	Seats	Change
Liberal	1,154,493	39.07	1.99	15	▼1
National	91,049	3.08	0.36	2	Steady
Liberal/National Coalition	1,245,542	42.15	2.35	17	▼1
Labor	1,230,757	41.65	–2.72	20	▲1
Democrats	184,582	6.25	0.23		
Greens	174,399	5.90	3.81		
Independents	60,801	0.02			
One Nation	37,811	1.28	–2.44		
Citizens Electoral Council	6,692	0.23	0.08		
Christian Democrats	6,188	0.21	0.08		
No GST	5,104	0.17			
Liberals for Forests	1,960	0.07			
Lower Excise Fuel	1,194	0.04			
Total	2,955,031			37	
Two-party-preferred vote
Labor	1,540,614	52.14	–1.39	20	▲1
Liberal/National Coalition	1,414,417	46.47	+1.39	17	▼1
Invalid/blank votes	122,525	3.68	+0.47		
Turnout	2,955,031	95.61			
Registered voters	3,218,746				
Source: AEC Tally Room

== Results by division ==
=== Aston ===
2001 Australian federal election: Aston
Party	Candidate	Votes	%	±%
Liberal	Chris Pearce	42,973	50.78	+2.29
Labor	Kieran Boland	31,269	36.95	−1.56
Democrats	Ruth Kendall	5,952	7.03	−0.49
Greens	Mick Kir	3,062	3.62	+3.62
Christian Democrats	Ray Levick	1,074	1.27	+1.27
Citizens Electoral Council	Doug Mitchell	290	0.34	+0.34
Total formal votes		84,620	96.82	−0.35
Informal votes		2,782	3.18	+0.35
Turnout		87,402	97.12	
Two-party-preferred result
Liberal	Chris Pearce	47,531	56.17	+1.93
Labor	Kieran Boland	37,089	43.83	−1.93
Liberal hold		Swing	+1.93	

=== Ballarat ===
2001 Australian federal election: Ballarat
Party	Candidate	Votes	%	±%
Labor	Catherine King	35,558	44.14	+3.23
Liberal	Charles Collins	34,512	42.85	−2.39
Greens	Tony Kelly	5,126	6.36	+4.95
Democrats	Danii Coric	3,300	4.10	+0.40
One Nation	John Blanchard	2,053	2.55	−2.35
Total formal votes		80,549	97.12	+0.67
Informal votes		2,391	2.88	−0.67
Turnout		82,940	97.65	
Two-party-preferred result
Labor	Catherine King	42,471	52.73	+5.50
Liberal	Charles Collins	38,078	47.27	−5.50
Labor gain from Liberal		Swing	+5.50	

=== Batman ===
2001 Australian federal election: Batman
Party	Candidate	Votes	%	±%
Labor	Martin Ferguson	46,506	58.70	−7.13
Liberal	John Davies	17,196	21.71	+1.48
Greens	Alex Bhathal	9,171	11.58	+6.98
Democrats	Scott Kneebone	4,954	6.25	+1.24
Democratic Socialist	Jackie Lynch	1,064	1.34	+1.34
Citizens Electoral Council	Wayne Barwick	329	0.42	+0.42
Total formal votes		79,220	94.46	−1.63
Informal votes		4,647	5.54	+1.63
Turnout		83,867	93.49	
Two-party-preferred result
Labor	Martin Ferguson	59,478	75.08	−1.35
Liberal	John Davies	19,742	24.92	+1.35
Labor hold		Swing	−3.75	

=== Bendigo ===
2001 Australian federal election: Bendigo
Party	Candidate	Votes	%	±%
Labor	Steve Gibbons	35,630	43.48	+0.58
Liberal	Maurie Sharkey	32,311	39.43	+3.55
Greens	Bruce Rivendell	4,279	5.22	+2.56
Democrats	Helen Lilley	2,620	3.20	−1.33
One Nation	Neil Smith	2,039	2.49	−4.12
Christian Democrats	Phil Arnold	1,857	2.27	+2.27
Independent	Karel Zegers	1,387	1.69	+1.69
Independent	John Pasquarelli	1,073	1.31	+1.31
	Ron Barrow	744	0.91	+0.91
Total formal votes		81,940	96.28	+0.42
Informal votes		3,165	3.72	−0.42
Turnout		85,105	97.03	
Two-party-preferred result
Labor	Steve Gibbons	43,892	53.57	+0.10
Liberal	Maurie Sharkey	38,048	46.43	−0.10
Labor hold		Swing	+0.10	

=== Bruce ===
2001 Australian federal election: Bruce
Party	Candidate	Votes	%	±%
Labor	Alan Griffin	38,150	48.61	−0.05
Liberal	Reg Steel	31,813	40.54	+1.96
Democrats	Shaun Robyns	5,164	6.58	+0.56
Greens	David Collis	3,349	4.27	+2.74
Total formal votes		78,476	96.35	+0.04
Informal votes		2,969	3.65	−0.04
Turnout		81,445	95.62	
Two-party-preferred result
Labor	Alan Griffin	43,592	55.55	−1.17
Liberal	Reg Steel	34,884	44.45	+1.17
Labor hold		Swing	−1.17	

=== Burke ===
2001 Australian federal election: Burke
Party	Candidate	Votes	%	±%
Labor	Brendan O'Connor	39,138	47.74	−2.25
Liberal	Chris Dawe	31,282	38.16	+2.13
Greens	Marcus Ward	6,062	7.39	+5.48
Democrats	Geoff Lutz	5,493	6.70	+0.72
Total formal votes		81,975	96.43	+1.61
Informal votes		3,031	3.57	−1.61
Turnout		85,006	95.98	
Two-party-preferred result
Labor	Brendan O'Connor	45,504	55.51	−2.10
Liberal	Chris Dawe	36,471	44.49	+2.10
Labor hold		Swing	−2.10	

=== Calwell ===
2001 Australian federal election: Calwell
Party	Candidate	Votes	%	±%
Labor	Maria Vamvakinou	45,203	51.85	−10.50
Liberal	Darren Buller	22,020	25.26	−1.06
Independent	Andrew Theophanous	8,392	9.63	+9.63
Democrats	Robert Livesay	3,356	3.85	−2.84
No GST	John Abbotto	3,074	3.53	+3.53
Greens	Bee Barker	2,105	2.41	+2.41
Independent	D. Dervish	2,003	2.30	+2.30
	Mohamed Bochi	555	0.64	+0.64
Citizens Electoral Council	Sleiman Yohanna	465	0.53	+0.53
Total formal votes		87,173	93.56	−3.00
Informal votes		6,005	6.44	+3.00
Turnout		93,178	95.28	+0.73
Two-party-preferred result
Labor	Maria Vamvakinou	59,044	67.73	−1.25
Liberal	Darren Buller	28,129	32.27	+1.25
Labor hold		Swing	−1.25	

=== Casey ===
2001 Australian federal election: Casey
Party	Candidate	Votes	%	±%
Liberal	Tony Smith	40,354	51.26	+4.87
Labor	David McKenzie	26,211	33.29	−0.13
Democrats	Tom Joyce	6,738	8.56	+1.15
Greens	Lorraine Leach	5,424	6.89	+4.68
Total formal votes		78,727	96.42	+0.44
Informal votes		2,922	3.58	−0.44
Turnout		81,649	96.18	
Two-party-preferred result
Liberal	Tony Smith	45,004	57.16	+2.29
Labor	David McKenzie	33,723	42.84	−2.29
Liberal hold		Swing	+2.29	

=== Chisholm ===
2001 Australian federal election: Chisholm
Party	Candidate	Votes	%	±%
Liberal	Ros Clowes	34,836	43.58	+1.84
Labor	Anna Burke	33,929	42.44	+0.06
Democrats	James Bennett	5,379	6.73	−0.14
Greens	Howard Tankey	4,898	6.13	+3.03
No GST	John Murray	895	1.12	+1.12
Total formal votes		79,937	96.99	+0.56
Informal votes		2,481	3.01	−0.56
Turnout		82,418	95.26	
Two-party-preferred result
Labor	Anna Burke	42,179	52.77	+0.70
Liberal	Ros Clowes	37,758	47.23	−0.70
Labor hold		Swing	+0.70	

=== Corangamite ===
2001 Australian federal election: Corangamite
Party	Candidate	Votes	%	±%
Liberal	Stewart McArthur	37,929	47.42	+1.40
Labor	Michael Bjork-Billings	26,569	33.21	−2.87
Democrats	Robyn Hodge	5,128	6.41	+0.02
Greens	Iain Lygo	5,098	6.37	+3.30
One Nation	Graham Hills	1,982	2.48	−3.07
Liberals for Forests	Nigel Strauss	1,960	2.45	+2.45
Independent	Simon Arundell	1,326	1.66	−0.53
Total formal votes		79,992	96.62	−0.83
Informal votes		2,798	3.38	+0.83
Turnout		82,790	96.86	
Two-party-preferred result
Liberal	Stewart McArthur	44,529	55.67	+1.17
Labor	Michael Bjork-Billings	35,463	44.33	−1.17
Liberal hold		Swing	+1.17	

=== Corio ===
2001 Australian federal election: Corio
Party	Candidate	Votes	%	±%
Labor	Gavan O'Connor	38,021	48.75	−2.07
Liberal	Steve Malesic	28,254	36.22	+2.58
Democrats	Erica Menheere-Thompson	5,388	6.91	+1.18
Greens	Catherine Johnson	3,388	4.34	+4.34
One Nation	Herbert Tirkot	1,420	1.82	−3.25
	Tim Gooden	698	0.89	+0.89
	Cheryl Fairbrother	653	0.84	+0.84
Citizens Electoral Council	Gareth Hill	176	0.23	+0.23
Total formal votes		77,998	94.91	−1.89
Informal votes		4,185	5.09	+1.89
Turnout		82,183	96.47	
Two-party-preferred result
Labor	Gavan O'Connor	45,787	58.70	−2.66
Liberal	Steve Malesic	32,211	41.30	+2.66
Labor hold		Swing	−2.66	

=== Deakin ===
2001 Australian federal election: Deakin
Party	Candidate	Votes	%	±%
Liberal	Phil Barresi	37,417	47.26	+3.31
Labor	Helen Buckingham	30,397	38.39	−0.44
Democrats	Nahum Ayliffe	6,317	7.98	+0.00
Greens	Robyn Evans	5,045	6.37	+3.88
Total formal votes		79,176	97.44	+0.62
Informal votes		2,082	2.56	−0.62
Turnout		81,258	95.62	
Two-party-preferred result
Liberal	Phil Barresi	40,962	51.74	−0.19
Labor	Helen Buckingham	38,214	48.26	+0.19
Liberal hold		Swing	−0.19	

=== Dunkley ===
2001 Australian federal election: Dunkley
Party	Candidate	Votes	%	±%
Liberal	Bruce Billson	39,203	49.90	+3.66
Labor	Mark Conroy	28,088	35.75	−3.23
Greens	Henry Kelsall	4,486	5.71	+1.82
Democrats	Ian Woodhouse	4,350	5.54	−0.22
One Nation	Michael Cartwright	1,438	1.83	−2.62
Independent	Fletcher Davis	995	1.27	+1.27
Total formal votes		78,560	96.55	−0.57
Informal votes		2,805	3.45	+0.57
Turnout		81,365	96.27	
Two-party-preferred result
Liberal	Bruce Billson	43,537	55.42	+3.88
Labor	Mark Conroy	35,023	44.58	−3.88
Liberal hold		Swing	+3.88	

=== Flinders ===
2001 Australian federal election: Flinders
Party	Candidate	Votes	%	±%
Liberal	Greg Hunt	43,601	51.71	+4.32
Labor	Wayne Finch	27,695	32.85	−4.57
Greens	David de Rango	4,886	5.79	+3.13
Democrats	Richard Armstrong	4,690	5.56	−0.82
One Nation	Kevin Dowey	1,911	2.27	−2.95
Independent	Earle Wilson	968	1.15	+1.15
Independent	Ashley Blade	567	0.67	+0.67
Total formal votes		84,318	96.23	−0.61
Informal votes		3,300	3.77	+0.61
Turnout		87,618	96.47	
Two-party-preferred result
Liberal	Greg Hunt	48,585	57.62	+3.90
Labor	Wayne Finch	35,733	42.38	−3.90
Liberal hold		Swing	+3.90	

=== Gellibrand ===
2001 Australian federal election: Gellibrand
Party	Candidate	Votes	%	±%
Labor	Nicola Roxon	46,124	60.40	−7.07
Liberal	Christopher Tann	19,191	25.13	+5.15
Democrats	Rachel Richards	5,256	6.88	+2.40
Greens	Michele Finey	4,831	6.33	+3.47
	Jorge Jorquera	963	1.26	+1.26
Total formal votes		76,365	95.10	−0.68
Informal votes		3,938	4.90	+0.68
Turnout		80,303	93.31	
Two-party-preferred result
Labor	Nicola Roxon	54,814	71.78	−4.13
Liberal	Christopher Tann	21,551	28.22	+4.13
Labor hold		Swing	−4.13	

=== Gippsland ===
2001 Australian federal election: Gippsland
Party	Candidate	Votes	%	±%
National	Peter McGauran	34,555	45.62	+2.65
Labor	Bill Bolitho	19,469	25.70	−0.58
Independent	Doug Treasure	4,249	5.61	+0.10
Greens	Chris Aitken	4,205	5.55	+5.55
One Nation	Michael Freshwater	4,066	5.37	−6.06
Democrats	Jo McCubbin	3,331	4.40	−0.92
Independent	John Jago	1,579	2.08	+2.08
Independent	Phillip Evans	1,551	2.05	+2.05
Independent	Ben Buckley	1,249	1.65	+1.65
Independent	Marjorie Thorpe	791	1.04	+1.04
Independent	Phillip Robinson	487	0.64	+0.64
Citizens Electoral Council	Frank Williams	221	0.29	+0.29
Total formal votes		75,753	94.41	−0.66
Informal votes		4,484	5.59	+0.66
Turnout		80,237	96.02	
Two-party-preferred result
National	Peter McGauran	43,978	58.02	−0.81
Labor	Bill Bolitho	31,775	41.96	+0.81
National hold		Swing	−0.81	

=== Goldstein ===
2001 Australian federal election: Goldstein
Party	Candidate	Votes	%	±%
Liberal	David Kemp	43,535	52.72	+0.68
Labor	Rachel Powning	22,730	27.52	−6.00
Democrats	Michaela Newell	6,215	7.53	−0.12
Greens	Teresa Puszka	5,294	6.41	+3.52
Independent	Kristin Stegley	4,807	5.82	+5.82
Total formal votes		82,581	97.23	−0.06
Informal votes		2,350	2.77	+0.06
Turnout		84,931	94.60	
Two-party-preferred result
Liberal	David Kemp	49,122	59.48	+1.33
Labor	Rachel Powning	33,459	40.52	−1.33
Liberal hold		Swing	+1.33	

=== Higgins ===
2001 Australian federal election: Higgins
Party	Candidate	Votes	%	±%
Liberal	Peter Costello	42,437	53.19	−0.25
Labor	Katie Stephens	23,038	28.88	−3.24
Democrats	Katie Moss	7,275	9.12	+1.66
Greens	Tania Giles	7,029	8.81	+6.03
Total formal votes		79,779	97.32	+0.33
Informal votes		2,198	2.68	−0.33
Turnout		81,977	93.47	
Two-party-preferred result
Liberal	Peter Costello	46,583	58.39	−1.23
Labor	Katie Stephens	33,196	41.61	+1.23
Liberal hold		Swing	−1.23	

=== Holt ===
2001 Australian federal election: Holt
Party	Candidate	Votes	%	±%
Labor	Anthony Byrne	44,681	56.50	−3.29
Liberal	Jason Wood	24,621	31.13	+1.60
Democrats	Polly Morgan	5,240	6.63	+0.64
Greens	Theos Patrinos	2,149	2.72	+2.72
Christian Democrats	Lynne Dickson	1,513	1.91	+0.16
	Gordon Ford	880	1.11	+1.11
Total formal votes		79,084	95.06	−0.41
Informal votes		4,109	4.94	+0.41
Turnout		83,193	95.05	
Two-party-preferred result
Labor	Anthony Byrne	50,078	63.32	−1.79
Liberal	Jason Wood	29,006	36.68	+1.79
Labor hold		Swing	−1.79	

=== Hotham ===
2001 Australian federal election: Hotham
Party	Candidate	Votes	%	±%
Labor	Simon Crean	44,351	54.45	−2.53
Liberal	Priscilla Ruffolo	28,579	35.09	+2.88
Democrats	Jessica Joss	4,383	5.38	+0.78
Greens	Ollie Bennett	3,544	4.35	+2.51
Citizens Electoral Council	Simon Hall	598	0.73	+0.73
Total formal votes		81,455	96.44	+0.08
Informal votes		3,005	3.56	−0.08
Turnout		84,460	95.08	
Two-party-preferred result
Labor	Simon Crean	49,701	61.01	−2.58
Liberal	Priscilla Ruffolo	31,754	38.99	+2.58
Labor hold		Swing	−2.58	

=== Indi ===
2001 Australian federal election: Indi
Party	Candidate	Votes	%	±%
Liberal	Sophie Panopoulos	31,152	40.07	−10.79
Labor	Barbara Murdoch	21,014	27.02	−1.41
National	Don Chambers	9,552	12.29	+12.29
Independent	Nelson McIntosh	5,284	6.80	+6.80
One Nation	Lyn Bennetts	3,079	3.96	−3.98
Greens	Michael Wardle	2,956	3.80	+1.40
Democrats	Robert Chuck	2,920	3.76	−1.12
	Pat Adams	895	1.15	+1.15
Christian Democrats	Philip Seymour	884	1.14	+1.14
Total formal votes		77,736	94.78	−1.34
Informal votes		4,281	5.22	+1.34
Turnout		82,017	95.91	
Two-party-preferred result
Liberal	Sophie Panopoulos	47,535	61.19	+1.08
Labor	Barbara Murdoch	30,201	38.81	−1.08
Liberal hold		Swing	+1.08	

=== Isaacs ===
2001 Australian federal election: Isaacs
Party	Candidate	Votes	%	±%
Labor	Ann Corcoran	31,951	42.18	−6.25
Liberal	Michael Shepherdson	31,520	41.61	+3.44
Democrats	Haydn Fletcher	5,627	7.43	+1.50
Greens	Darren Bujeya	3,073	4.06	+1.92
One Nation	John Groves	1,358	1.79	−2.25
Independent	Shirly Oakley	1,342	1.77	+1.77
Independent	Patricia Brook	640	0.84	+0.84
Citizens Electoral Council	Heather Stanton	246	0.32	+0.32
Total formal votes		75,757	95.35	−1.03
Informal votes		3,691	4.65	+1.03
Turnout		79,448	97.11	
Two-party-preferred result
Labor	Ann Corcoran	40,011	52.81	−3.59
Liberal	Michael Shepherdson	35,746	47.19	+3.59
Labor hold		Swing	−3.59	

=== Jagajaga ===
2001 Australian federal election: Jagajaga
Party	Candidate	Votes	%	±%
Labor	Jenny Macklin	37,027	45.61	−2.54
Liberal	Brett Jones	32,619	40.18	+0.81
Democrats	Peter Wigg	5,421	6.68	+0.81
Greens	Samantha Roberts	5,178	6.38	+3.11
Independent	Gary Schorel-Hlavka	673	0.83	+0.83
Citizens Electoral Council	Paul Gallagher	266	0.33	+0.33
Total formal votes		81,184	96.36	−1.06
Informal votes		3,070	3.64	+1.06
Turnout		84,254	95.93	
Two-party-preferred result
Labor	Jenny Macklin	45,170	55.64	−0.27
Liberal	Brett Jones	36,014	44.36	+0.27
Labor hold		Swing	−0.27	

=== Kooyong ===
2001 Australian federal election: Kooyong
Party	Candidate	Votes	%	±%
Liberal	Petro Georgiou	44,244	55.08	+0.26
Labor	Tom Wilson	21,096	26.26	−3.18
Greens	Peter Campbell	8,607	10.72	+6.67
Democrats	Ari Sharp	6,374	7.94	−0.18
Total formal votes		80,321	97.48	−0.50
Informal votes		2,075	2.52	+0.50
Turnout		82,396	94.86	
Two-party-preferred result
Liberal	Petro Georgiou	48,944	60.94	−0.45
Labor	Tom Wilson	31,377	39.06	+0.45
Liberal hold		Swing	−0.45	

=== La Trobe ===
2001 Australian federal election: La Trobe
Party	Candidate	Votes	%	±%
Liberal	Bob Charles	37,641	46.59	+3.75
Labor	Philip Staindl	27,912	34.55	−3.22
Democrats	Tony Holland	6,424	7.95	−0.83
Greens	Craig Smith	5,740	7.10	+3.29
One Nation	June Scott	1,304	1.61	−2.71
Christian Democrats	Wolfgang Voigt	861	1.07	+0.06
Independent	Jason Allen	530	0.66	+0.66
Independent	Frank Dean	386	0.48	+0.03
Total formal votes		80,798	95.80	−0.59
Informal votes		3,544	4.20	+0.59
Turnout		84,342	95.92	
Two-party-preferred result
Liberal	Bob Charles	43,366	53.67	+2.68
Labor	Philip Staindl	37,432	46.33	−2.68
Liberal hold		Swing	+2.68	

=== Lalor ===
2001 Australian federal election: Lalor
Party	Candidate	Votes	%	±%
Labor	Julia Gillard	47,490	58.10	−3.12
Liberal	David McConnell	24,634	30.14	+4.55
Democrats	Roger Howe	6,297	7.70	+2.30
Greens	Tony Briffa	3,321	4.06	+2.30
Total formal votes		81,742	95.65	−0.99
Informal votes		3,718	4.35	+0.99
Turnout		85,460	96.20	
Two-party-preferred result
Labor	Julia Gillard	53,644	65.63	−4.19
Liberal	David McConnell	28,098	34.37	+4.19
Labor hold		Swing	−4.19	

=== Mallee ===
2001 Australian federal election: Mallee
Party	Candidate	Votes	%	±%
National	John Forrest	44,769	59.06	+1.88
Labor	John Zigouras	15,440	20.37	−1.47
One Nation	Bob Mackley	6,550	8.64	−3.97
Independent	Ross Douglass	3,704	4.89	+4.89
Democrats	Timothy Kelly	3,532	4.66	+0.10
Greens	Julie Rivendell	1,809	2.39	+2.39
Total formal votes		75,804	96.38	−0.71
Informal votes		2,850	3.62	+0.71
Turnout		78,654	96.62	
Two-party-preferred result
National	John Forrest	53,007	69.93	+0.56
Labor	John Zigouras	22,797	30.07	−0.56
National hold		Swing	+0.56	

=== Maribyrnong ===
2001 Australian federal election: Maribyrnong
Party	Candidate	Votes	%	±%
Labor	Bob Sercombe	44,825	59.91	−4.75
Liberal	Grahame Barclay	20,705	27.67	+3.25
Democrats	Charles Williams	4,567	6.10	+1.48
Greens	Jules Beckwith	2,878	3.85	+1.36
Citizens Electoral Council	Andre Kozlowski	1,840	2.46	+0.64
Total formal votes		74,815	94.55	−0.97
Informal votes		4,309	5.45	+0.97
Turnout		79,124	94.71	
Two-party-preferred result
Labor	Bob Sercombe	50,410	67.38	−4.68
Liberal	Grahame Barclay	24,405	32.62	+4.68
Labor hold		Swing	−4.68	

=== McEwen ===
2001 Australian federal election: McEwen
Party	Candidate	Votes	%	±%
Liberal	Fran Bailey	37,963	46.01	+2.55
Labor	Andrew MacLeod	31,986	38.76	−1.27
Greens	Jim Romagnesi	5,006	6.07	+3.40
Democrats	Tony Carden	3,986	4.83	+0.01
One Nation	Alan Salter	2,448	2.97	−2.15
Independent	Bill Lodwick	1,129	1.37	+1.37
Total formal votes		82,518	96.19	−0.47
Informal votes		3,272	3.81	+0.47
Turnout		85,790	97.24	
Two-party-preferred result
Liberal	Fran Bailey	42,249	51.20	+0.16
Labor	Andrew MacLeod	40,269	48.80	−0.16
Liberal hold		Swing	+0.16	

=== McMillan ===
2001 Australian federal election: McMillan
Party	Candidate	Votes	%	±%
Labor	Christian Zahra	35,238	44.48	+7.57
Liberal	Jim Forbes	31,532	39.80	+0.94
Democrats	David Wall	3,233	4.08	−0.17
Greens	Jenny Farrar	2,918	3.68	+1.51
One Nation	John Holtman	2,864	3.62	−1.61
National	David Roberts	2,172	2.74	+2.74
	Betty Howell	1,262	1.59	+1.59
Total formal votes		79,219	96.52	+0.63
Informal votes		2,853	3.48	−0.63
Turnout		82,072	96.44	
Two-party-preferred result
Labor	Christian Zahra	41,559	52.46	+1.89
Liberal	Jim Forbes	37,660	47.54	−1.89
Labor hold		Swing	+1.89	

=== Melbourne ===
2001 Australian federal election: Melbourne
Party	Candidate	Votes	%	±%
Labor	Lindsay Tanner	39,978	47.65	−10.25
Liberal	Con Frantzeskos	20,870	24.87	+0.57
Greens	Pamela Curr	13,174	15.70	+9.64
Democrats	Brent McKenna	8,062	9.61	+0.64
Independent Socialist	Stephen Jolly	1,260	1.50	+1.50
Imperial British	James Ferrari	558	0.67	+0.21
Total formal votes		83,902	96.23	−0.11
Informal votes		3,288	3.77	+0.11
Turnout		87,190	91.58	
Two-party-preferred result
Labor	Lindsay Tanner	58,808	70.09	−1.71
Liberal	Con Frantzeskos	25,094	29.91	+1.71
Labor hold		Swing	−1.71	

=== Melbourne Ports ===
2001 Australian federal election: Melbourne Ports
Party	Candidate	Votes	%	±%
Liberal	Andrew McLorinan	31,384	39.71	+0.72
Labor	Michael Danby	31,110	39.36	−4.74
Greens	Jeannette Kavanagh	8,912	11.28	+6.55
Democrats	Greg Chipp	7,328	9.27	+1.08
Citizens Electoral Council	Jeremy Beck	305	0.39	+0.39
Total formal votes		79,039	96.74	−0.15
Informal votes		2,662	3.26	+0.15
Turnout		81,701	92.32	
Two-party-preferred result
Labor	Michael Danby	44,018	55.69	−0.14
Liberal	Andrew McLorinan	35,021	44.31	+0.14
Labor hold		Swing	−0.14	

=== Menzies ===
2001 Australian federal election: Menzies
Party	Candidate	Votes	%	±%
Liberal	Kevin Andrews	41,565	53.28	+6.39
Labor	Olga Vasilopoulos	25,895	33.19	+0.34
Democrats	Michael Ryan	5,113	6.55	+0.74
Greens	Barry Watson	4,301	5.51	+5.51
No GST	Brendan Griffin	1,135	1.45	+1.45
Total formal votes		78,009	96.55	−0.27
Informal votes		2,784	3.45	+0.27
Turnout		80,793	95.78	
Two-party-preferred result
Liberal	Kevin Andrews	45,977	58.94	+3.54
Labor	Olga Vasilopoulos	32,032	41.06	−3.54
Liberal hold		Swing	+3.54	

=== Murray ===
2001 Australian federal election: Murray
Party	Candidate	Votes	%	±%
Liberal	Sharman Stone	53,498	67.24	+7.81
Labor	Alan Calder	16,083	20.21	−0.50
One Nation	Robert Hellemons	3,162	3.97	−2.81
Democrats	Elizabeth Taylor	2,514	3.16	+0.22
Independent	Simon Bush	2,483	3.12	+3.12
Greens	David Jones	1,827	2.30	+0.69
Total formal votes		79,567	96.47	−0.11
Informal votes		2,908	3.53	+0.11
Turnout		82,475	97.25	
Two-party-preferred result
Liberal	Sharman Stone	58,824	73.93	+1.87
Labor	Alan Calder	20,743	26.07	−1.87
Liberal hold		Swing	+1.87	

=== Scullin ===
2001 Australian federal election: Scullin
Party	Candidate	Votes	%	±%
Labor	Harry Jenkins	51,294	63.07	−4.65
Liberal	Lucas Kostadinoski	21,706	26.69	+2.25
Democrats	Brian Mawhinney	5,317	6.54	+0.71
Greens	Merinda Gray	2,422	2.98	+2.98
Citizens Electoral Council	Trudy Campbell	589	0.72	+0.72
Total formal votes		81,328	95.12	−1.41
Informal votes		4,174	4.88	+1.41
Turnout		85,502	96.62	
Two-party-preferred result
Labor	Harry Jenkins	56,265	69.17	−2.67
Liberal	Lucas Kostadinoski	25,051	30.83	+2.67
Labor hold		Swing	−2.67	

=== Wannon ===
2001 Australian federal election: Wannon
Party	Candidate	Votes	%	±%
Liberal	David Hawker	40,366	52.39	+3.32
Labor	Richard Morrow	25,648	33.29	+2.08
Greens	Gillian Blair	2,764	3.59	+3.59
Democrats	Amanda Packer	2,296	2.98	−3.49
One Nation	Olive Schmidt	2,136	2.77	−4.92
Independent	Leigh McDonald	1,760	2.28	+2.28
Lower Excise Fuel	Ricky Witney	1,194	1.55	+1.55
Independent	Robert O'Brien	878	1.14	−1.24
Total formal votes		77,042	96.13	−1.11
Informal votes		3,098	3.87	+1.11
Turnout		80,140	97.29	
Two-party-preferred result
Liberal	David Hawker	45,921	59.58	+2.14
Labor	Richard Morrow	31,120	40.42	−2.14
Liberal hold		Swing	+2.14	

=== Wills ===
2001 Australian federal election: Wills
Party	Candidate	Votes	%	±%
Labor	Kelvin Thomson	44,019	56.03	−7.93
Liberal	Vytautas Valasinavicius	21,030	26.77	+1.08
Greens	Richard Di Natale	6,081	7.74	+7.74
Democrats	Robert Stone	5,036	6.41	+0.70
Citizens Electoral Council	Craig Isherwood	1,367	1.74	+1.19
Socialist Alliance	David Glanz	1,036	1.32	+1.32
Total formal votes		78,569	94.81	−0.92
Informal votes		4,302	5.19	+0.92
Turnout		82,871	93.93	
Two-party-preferred result
Labor	Kelvin Thomson	54,542	69.42	−1.54
Liberal	Vytautas Valasinavicius	24,027	30.56	+1.54
Labor hold		Swing	−1.54	

== See also ==
- Results of the 2001 Australian federal election (House of Representatives)
- Members of the Australian House of Representatives, 2001–2004
