= Division of Burke (1969–2004) =

Former Australian federal electoral division

Burke Australian House of Representatives Division
- Created: 1969
- Abolished: 2004
- Namesake: Robert O'Hara Burke
- Coordinates: 37°40′00″S 144°40′00″E

The Division of Burke was an Australian Electoral Division in Victoria. The division was named after Robert O'Hara Burke, an explorer who led the Victorian expedition in 1860, the first to cross Australia from south to north. The division was created in 1969 and abolished in 2004.

When it was first created in 1969, it was located in the outer northern and western suburbs of Melbourne, including Broadmeadows, Thomastown, Sunbury, Sydenham and Keilor, as well as rural areas north of Melbourne, including Donnybrook, Wallan and Heathcote Junction. The division replaced a significant portion of the Division of Lalor, and previously Division of Corio before 1949.

Beginning from the 1977 redistribution, it gradually shifted west into other rural areas including Bacchus Marsh, Gisborne and Lancefield, away from the outer northern suburbs. In 1984 and 1988, the division was massively expanded to include Heathcote to the north, Castlemaine to the north-west, Daylesford and Ballan to the west, and Meredith to the south-west. Most of this expansion was undone in the 1989 redistribution. In that redistribution, it also lost areas in the northern suburbs, such as Greenvale and Somerton, to the Division of Calwell. From that same redistribution onwards, it began expanding south-easternly from Bacchus Marsh back into the outer wester suburbs of Melbourne, such as Melton, Deer Park and Caroline Springs. It expanded into Tarneit in 1994.

When it was abolished at the 2004 federal election, the division was split among multiple divisions:

- the Gisborne, Woodend and Lancefield areas were transferred to the Division of McEwen
- Kyneton was transferred to the Division of Bendigo
- Sunbury was transferred to the Division of Calwell
- Bacchus Marsh was transferred to the Division of Ballarat
- Melton and Tarneit were transferred to the Division of Lalor
- the Deer Park and Caroline Springs areas were transferred to the new Division of Gorton

The division was held by the Australian Labor Party for its entire existence. However, a 1984 redistribution made it far less secure for Labor, and for the next two decades it was usually a marginal Labor seat. The last member for Burke, Brendan O'Connor, was elected for the new seat of Gorton in 2004.

== Members ==
Image	Member	Party	Term	Notes
	Keith Johnson (1929–1995)	Labor	25 October 1969 – 19 September 1980	Retired
	Andrew Theophanous (1946–)	Labor	18 October 1980 – 1 December 1984	Transferred to the Division of Calwell
	Neil O'Keefe (1947–)	Labor	1 December 1984 – 8 October 2001	Retired
	Brendan O'Connor (1962–)	Labor	10 November 2001 – 9 October 2004	Transferred to the Division of Gorton after Burke was abolished in 2004

== See also ==
- Division of Burke (1949–1955)
