= Keith Johnson (Australian politician) =

Australian politician (1929-1995)

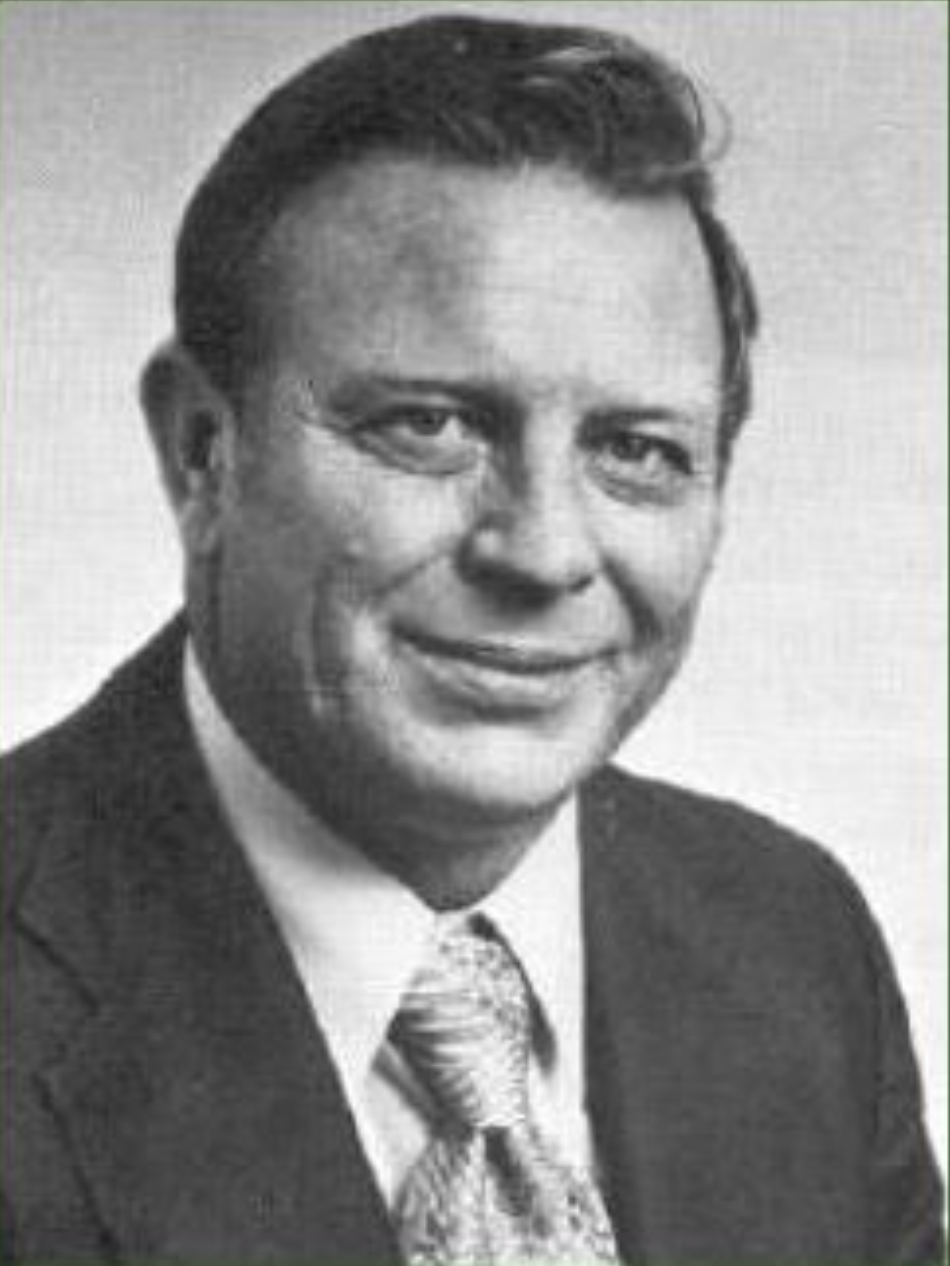

Member of the Australian Parliament for Burke
- In office 25 October 1969 – 19 September 1980
- Preceded by: New seat
- Succeeded by: Andrew Theophanous

Personal details
- Born: 28 March 1929 Melbourne, Victoria, Australia
- Died: 24 September 1995 (aged 66)
- Party: Australian Labor Party
- Occupation: Factory worker

Leonard Keith Johnson (28 March 1929 – 24 September 1995) was an Australian politician. Born in Melbourne, he was educated at public schools before becoming a factory worker and storeman. An organiser of the Federated Miscellaneous Workers' Union of Australia, he was also active in local politics as a councillor on Broadmeadows Municipal Council. In 1969, he was elected to the Australian House of Representatives as the Labor member for Burke. He held the seat until his retirement in 1980. Johnson died in September 1995.

Parliament of Australia
New division	Member for Burke; 1969–1980	Succeeded by Andrew Theophanous
