= Neil O'Keefe =

Australian politician and lobbyist

The Honourable Neil O'Keefe

Member of the Australian Parliament for Burke
- In office 1 December 1984 – 8 October 2001
- Preceded by: Andrew Theophanous
- Succeeded by: Brendan O'Connor

Personal details
- Born: 7 May 1947 (age 79) Melbourne, Victoria
- Party: Australian Labor Party
- Education: La Trobe University; Monash University; Glenroy High School
- Occupation: Teacher

Neil Patrick O'Keefe (born 7 May 1947) is a retired Australian politician and lobbyist. Born in Melbourne, he was educated at La Trobe University and then Monash University before becoming a teacher, union official and small business proprietor. In 1984, he was elected to the Australian House of Representatives as the Labor member for Burke. On 24 March 1993 he was appointed Parliamentary Secretary to the Minister for Transport and Communications. On 24 December 1993 this portfolio became Parliamentary Secretary to the Minister for Industrial Relations and Transport. On 24 March 1994 he became Parliamentary Secretary to the Minister for Transport, a position he held until Labor's electoral defeat in 1996. O'Keefe retired unexpectedly in 2001, after he'd been preselected to run again in the election scheduled that year.

After his retirement from politics, he was able to use his close relationship with then Victorian Premier Steve Bracks, who he once employed as an adviser to build another career as a lobbyist and through government appointments. On 8 May 2003 O'Keefe accepted a Victorian government appointment as chairman of the joint venture between the government and the Royal Agricultural Society to redevelop the Royal Melbourne Showgrounds.

O'Keefe was a director of the Western Bulldogs Football Club and was executive producer of Australian film production "The Independent." He also served as an independent director of Water for Rivers, an agency created jointly by federal, NSW and Victorian governments that administers the Snowy and Murray Rivers. He also served as chair of the Centre for Public Infrastructure and Director of Melbourne University Private, before it folded.

In 2011, the Victorian Ombudsman criticised O'Keefe for acting with a conflict of interest as a director of Water for Rivers, the joint Commonwealth-state water buyback agency, through which he obtained a commercial advantage for his company, Sustainable Soils & Farms. The then Victorian Treasurer, Kim Wells, wrote to O'Keefe and asked for O'Keefe's resignation, stating, "It is my view that these dealings were highly inappropriate, present a conflict of interest with your role on Water for Rivers and are not befitting a representative of the Victorian government."

An active motorcyclist, Neil O'Keefe has also served as the ministerial appointed chair of the Victorian Motorcycle Advisory Council for the past seven years.

The former politician is now a lobbyist, through his company O'Keefe Solutions. His clients include large-scale property developers.

Parliament of Australia
Preceded by Andrew Theophanous	Member for Burke; 1984–2001	Succeeded by Brendan O'Connor
