= Andrew Theophanous =

Australian politician

The Honourable Andrew Theophanous

Member of the Australian Parliament for Calwell
- In office 1 December 1984 – 10 November 2001
- Preceded by: New seat
- Succeeded by: Maria Vamvakinou

Member of the Australian Parliament for Burke
- In office 18 October 1980 – 1 December 1984
- Preceded by: Keith Johnson
- Succeeded by: Neil O'Keefe

Personal details
- Born: Andrew Charles Theophanous; 24 March 1946 (age 80) Polis Chrysochous, British Cyprus
- Party: Labor (1980–2000); Independent (2000–2001)
- Spouse: Kathryn Eriksson
- Education: Monash University; University of Oxford; University of Melbourne
- Occupation: Lecturer

Andrew Charles Theophanous (born 24 March 1946) is a Cypriot-born Australian former politician. He was an Australian Labor Party member of the House of Representatives from 1980 to 2000, and an independent member from 2000 to 2001. He is the author of three books and numerous articles on political theory and philosophy, especially in the areas of multiculturalism and social justice.

He spent 21 months in jail for one charge of bribery of $2000, two charges relating to misuse of his position over one visa application, and another immigration matter. Theophanous pleaded not guilty to all charges but was convicted. Despite those convictions, he has consistently maintained his innocence, while procedural errors in his trial were later found.

He later made a Petition of Mercy application seeking a retrial on the three convictions. To date, his efforts to quash his prior convictions have been unsuccessful. He is related to many other prominent Australian politicians from Victoria.

== Early life ==
Theophanous was born in Polis Chrysochous, Cyprus, on 24 March 1946, to a Greek Cypriot father and a Greek mother, a refugee who had fled Nazi occupied Greece. He migrated to Australia at the age of eight, with his mother, brother Theo Theophanous and sister; his father had arrived three years earlier. He grew up in Broadmeadows in Melbourne, entered Monash University and graduated with a Bachelor of Arts with First Class Honours. He gained a B.Litt. from University of Oxford and a Ph.D. in philosophy from University of Melbourne. In 1980, his first book Australian Democracy in Crisis: a radical approach to Australian politics was published by Oxford University Press. He became a lecturer in politics at Melbourne State College and later in social theory at Melbourne University. He also lectured at the University of Nevada, USA, and as Senior Teaching Fellow at Monash University.

== Political career ==
Theophanous was first elected as the Labor member for the Melbourne electorate of Burke in 1980. He switched to the new safe Labor electorate of Calwell in 1984. Theophanous was heavily interested in immigration matters, and from 1989 to 1993, was Chairman of the Joint Standing Committee on Migration. In this capacity, Theophanous' committee produced a number of reports on immigration policy. In one of these reports, 'Australia's Refugee and Humanitarian System: Achieving a Balance between Refuge and Control (1992)', Theophanous strongly supported granting permanent residence to 45,000 Chinese students and their dependents, who had been in Australia at the time of the 1989 Tiananmen Square protests and massacre in China. This view was later adopted by the Keating Government in November 1993.

In March 1993, Theophanous was appointed Parliamentary Secretary to the Minister for Housing, Local Government and Community Services and Parliamentary Secretary to the Minister for Health. In December 1993, he was appointed Parliamentary Secretary to the Minister for Housing, Local Government and Human Services. Also, in December 1993, he was appointed Parliamentary Secretary to Prime Minister Paul Keating, who had enjoyed his support in two caucus leadership ballots, which made him unusual in the Left grouping, who mostly supported Bob Hawke. As Parliamentary Secretary to the Prime Minister, his main role was the promotion of the Access and Equity program within the Federal government departments.

Theophanous also wrote two more books: "Understanding Social Justice: an Australian perspective" (1994); and "Understanding Multiculturalism and Australian Identity" (1995). Both books were officially launched by Prime Minister Keating and were used in a number of academic courses.

== Resignation ==
During 1999, a convicted heroin dealer working as an informant for the National Crime Authority (NCA) alleged that Theophanous was involved in migration fraud, and in July 1999 the NCA launched an investigation, codenamed Operation Legume. The major charge arising out of this was that Theophanous was involved in a conspiracy with the NCA informant to defraud the Commonwealth by making false representations in relation to attempting to bring the NCA's informant's Chinese girlfriend to Australia unlawfully. He was also charged in 2000 with taking an unlawful inducement and soliciting an unlawful inducement.

Theophanous resigned from the Labor Party on 18 April 2000. His brother, Theo, condemned the resignation, calling it "an action taken by him with which I strongly disagree. I do not believe his actions are an appropriate response". At this time, Andrew Theophanous announced that he would serve out his term as an independent. During this period as an independent, he initiated a number of parliamentary motions on immigration, refugees, multicultural affairs and human rights. He recontested the seat as an independent candidate at the 2001 election. He polled 9.6% of the vote, with the support of the Unity Party, but the seat was won by the new Labor candidate and former staffer, Maria Vamvakinou.

Theophanous was jailed in May 2002 and sentenced to six years in prison with a minimum of 3.5 years. However, he served only 21 months, and was released in February 2004. His barrister, Stephen Shirrefs SC, successfully appealed the conviction for conspiracy to defraud which resulted in the Supreme Court of Victoria quashing this major charge.

Represented by barrister Gavan Meredith, now a County Court judge, and lawyer William "Bill" Doogue, Theophanous faced a process by the Commonwealth Director of Public Prosecutions (CDPP) to reinstitute the conspiracy charge. The pre-trial commenced in early 2006 and continued for three months. In her ruling of July 2006, in the County Court of Victoria, Judge Jeanette Morrish dismissed and permanently stayed the conspiracy charge. She said that Theophanous should not be retried on the charge to defraud the Commonwealth because the former National Crime Authority had withheld evidence crucial to his original case and subsequent appeal. She also said 'the conduct of NCA officers who withheld documents for seven and a half years and despite 20 subpoenas was "grossly inadequate" and ... That conduct seriously calls into question the integrity of all previous proceedings'. The CDPP did not appeal the ruling.

As a result of the findings of Judge Morrish, Theophanous applied to the Commonwealth Attorney-General for the Governor-General to grant a retrial on the three remaining convictions under the Royal prerogative of mercy process. The FOI process secured additional information being held by the successor of the NCA, the Australian Criminal Intelligence Commission, which had not been secured before the Trial, in spite of the subpoenas issued at the time. As of 2021 a decision from the Federal Government on the prerogative of mercy has not been made.

== Family ==
Theophanous is married to Dr. Kathryn Eriksson, an archaeologist and high school teacher. In November 2005, she was elected as a Brimbank Horseshoe Bend Ward Councillor. Theophanous' brother Theo Theophanous is a former state Labor politician and minister. Theo's daughter and Andrew's niece Kat Theophanous is also a state Labor politician and is the member for Northcote since 2018.

== See also ==
- Theophanous v Herald & Weekly Times Ltd

Parliament of Australia
Preceded by Keith Johnson	Member for Burke; 1980–1984	Succeeded by Neil O'Keefe
New division	Member for Calwell; 1984–2001	Succeeded by Maria Vamvakinou
