= Electoral results for the Bendigo Province =

Victoria, Australia, district election results

This is a list of electoral results for the Bendigo Province in Victorian state elections.

== Members for Bendigo Province ==
Year	Member	Party	Member	Party
1904	William Gray		Joseph Sternberg	
1904	Joseph Abbott		Joseph Sternberg	
1904	Alfred Hicks		Joseph Sternberg	
1907	Alfred Hicks		Joseph Sternberg	
1910	Alfred Hicks		Joseph Sternberg	
1913	Alfred Hicks		Joseph Sternberg	
1916	Alfred Hicks		Joseph Sternberg	
1917	Alfred Hicks	Nationalist	Joseph Sternberg	Nationalist
1919	Alfred Hicks	Nationalist	Joseph Sternberg	Nationalist
1921	Herbert Keck	Nationalist	Joseph Sternberg	Nationalist
1922	Herbert Keck	Nationalist	Joseph Sternberg	Nationalist
1925	Herbert Keck	Nationalist	Joseph Sternberg	Nationalist
1928	Herbert Keck	Nationalist	George Lansell	Nationalist
1931	Herbert Keck	Nationalist	George Lansell	Nationalist
1931	Herbert Keck	United Australia	George Lansell	United Australia
1934	Herbert Keck	United Australia	George Lansell	United Australia
1937	John Lienhop	Country	George Lansell	United Australia
1940	John Lienhop	Country	George Lansell	United Australia
1943	John Lienhop	Country	George Lansell	United Australia
1944	John Lienhop	Country	George Lansell	Country
1946	John Lienhop	Country	George Lansell	Country
1949	John Lienhop	Liberal and Country	George Lansell	Liberal and Country
1949	John Lienhop	Liberal and Country	George Lansell	Liberal and Country
1951	Herbert Ludbrook	Liberal and Country	George Lansell	Liberal and Country
1952	Herbert Ludbrook	Liberal and Country	Arthur Smith	Labor
1955	Herbert Ludbrook	Liberal and Country	Arthur Smith	Labor
1958	Herbert Ludbrook	Liberal and Country	Arthur Smith	Labor
1961	Herbert Ludbrook	Liberal and Country	Arthur Smith	Labor
1964	Herbert Ludbrook	Liberal and Country	Jock Granter	Liberal and Country
1965	Herbert Ludbrook	Liberal	Jock Granter	Liberal
1967	Fred Grimwade	Liberal	Jock Granter	Liberal
1970	Fred Grimwade	Liberal	Jock Granter	Liberal
1973	Fred Grimwade	Liberal	Jock Granter	Liberal
1976	Fred Grimwade	Liberal	Bruce Reid	Liberal
1979	John Radford	Liberal	Bruce Reid	Liberal
1982	John Radford	Liberal	Bruce Reid	Liberal
1985			Bruce Reid	Liberal

== Election results ==
=== Elections in the 1980s ===
1982 Victorian state election: Bendigo Province
Party	Candidate	Votes	%	±%
Labor	Fabian Reid	34,312	40.0	+3.9
Liberal	Bruce Reid	30,871	35.9	+2.8
National	Clarence Rodda	14,922	17.4	−5.0
Democrats	Marlene Gunn	5,788	6.7	−1.7
Total formal votes		85,893	97.9	+0.4
Informal votes		1,816	2.1	−0.4
Turnout		87,709	95.2	+0.4
Two-party-preferred result
Liberal	Bruce Reid	46,487	54.1	−1.1
Labor	Fabian Reid	39,406	45.9	+1.1
Liberal hold		Swing	−1.1	

=== Elections in the 1970s ===
1979 Victorian state election: Bendigo Province
Party	Candidate	Votes	%	±%
Labor	Alan Calder	29,159	36.1	+1.7
Liberal	John Radford	26,767	33.1	−0.3
National	Stuart McDonald	18,140	22.4	−5.7
Democrats	Douglas Linford	6,778	8.4	+8.4
Total formal votes		80,844	97.5	−0.5
Informal votes		2,039	2.5	+0.5
Turnout		82,883	94.8	−0.5
Two-party-preferred result
Liberal	John Radford	44,624	55.2	−5.6
Labor	Alan Calder	36,220	44.8	+5.6
Liberal hold		Swing	−5.6	

1976 Victorian state election: Bendigo Province
Party	Candidate	Votes	%	±%
Labor	Elaine Knight	26,652	34.4	
Liberal	Bruce Reid	25,863	33.4	
National	Michael Clarke	21,821	28.1	
Democratic Labor	Ronald Gane	3,206	4.1	
Total formal votes		77,542	98.0	
Informal votes		1,604	2.0	
Turnout		79,146	95.3	
Two-party-preferred result
Liberal	Bruce Reid	47,153	60.8	
Labor	Elaine Knight	30,389	39.2	
Liberal hold		Swing		

1973 Victorian state election: Bendigo Province
Party	Candidate	Votes	%	±%
Labor	Stewart Anderson	29,789	45.5	−1.5
Liberal	Fred Grimwade	29,725	45.4	+5.7
Democratic Labor	William Drechsler	5,905	9.0	−4.3
Total formal votes		65,419	97.5	−0.3
Informal votes		1,656	2.5	+0.3
Turnout		67,075	95.3	0.0
Two-party-preferred result
Liberal	Fred Grimwade	34,707	53.0	+2.0
Labor	Stewart Anderson	30,712	47.0	−2.0
Liberal hold		Swing	+2.0	

1970 Victorian state election: Bendigo Province
Party	Candidate	Votes	%	±%
Labor	Stewart Anderson	27,702	47.0	+3.9
Liberal	Jock Granter	23,369	39.7	+9.8
Democratic Labor	William Drechsler	7,826	13.3	+1.2
Total formal votes		58,897	97.8	+0.3
Informal votes		1,349	2.2	−0.3
Turnout		60,246	95.3	+0.5
Two-party-preferred result
Liberal	Jock Granter	30,012	51.0	+0.9
Labor	Stewart Anderson	28,885	49.0	−0.9
Liberal hold		Swing	+0.9	

=== Elections in the 1960s ===
1967 Victorian state election: Bendigo Province
Party	Candidate	Votes	%	±%
Labor	Kevin Curran	24,789	43.1	
Liberal	Fred Grimwade	17,223	29.9	
Country	Kenneth McLennan	8,572	14.9	
Democratic Labor	William Drechsler	6,991	12.1	
Total formal votes		57,575	97.5	
Informal votes		1,486	2.5	
Turnout		59,061	94.8	
Two-party-preferred result
Liberal	Fred Grimwade	28,849	50.1	
Labor	Kevin Curran	28,726	49.9	
Liberal hold		Swing		

1964 Victorian state election: Bendigo Province
Party	Candidate	Votes	%	±%
Labor	Arthur Smith	25,664	45.2	+1.2
Liberal and Country	Jock Granter	21,004	37.0	−1.2
Democratic Labor	William Drechsler	10,168	14.8	−3.6
Total formal votes		56,836	98.1	+0.3
Informal votes		1,123	1.9	−0.3
Turnout		57,959	95.4	−0.8
Two-party-preferred result
Liberal and Country	Jock Granter	30,092	52.9	−1.1
Labor	Arthur Smith	26,744	47.1	+1.1
Liberal and Country gain from Labor		Swing	−1.1	

1961 Victorian state election: Bendigo Province
Party	Candidate	Votes	%	±%
Labor	Patrick McMahon	24,790	43.9	−4.2
Liberal and Country	Thomas Grigg	21,575	38.2	−0.5
Democratic Labor	William Drechsler	10,157	18.0	+4.8
Total formal votes		56,522	97.8	−1.2
Informal votes		1,266	2.2	+1.2
Turnout		57,788	96.2	+2.0
Two-party-preferred result
Liberal and Country	Thomas Grigg	30,506	54.0	+4.9
Labor	Patrick McMahon	26,016	46.0	−4.9
Liberal and Country hold		Swing	+4.9	

=== Elections in the 1950s ===
Victorian Legislative Council election, 1958: Bendigo Province
Party	Candidate	Votes	%	±%
Labor	Arthur Smith	26,841	48.1	+8.4
Liberal and Country	George Morison	21,591	38.7	−6.4
Democratic Labor	Arthur White	7,368	13.2	−2.0
Total formal votes		55,800	99.0	+0.1
Informal votes		536	1.0	−0.1
Turnout		56,336	94.2	+0.1
Two-party-preferred result
Labor	Arthur Smith	28,375	50.9	+9.3
Liberal and Country	George Morison	27,425	49.1	−9.3
Labor hold		Swing	+9.3	
