= Electoral results for the Central Highlands Province =

Australian state electoral results

This is a list of electoral results for the Central Highlands Province in Victorian state elections.

== Members for Central Highlands Province ==
Member 1	Party	Year		
Jock Granter	Liberal	1976	Member 2	Party
Jock Granter	Liberal	1979	Fred Grimwade	Liberal
Jock Granter	Liberal	1982	Fred Grimwade	Liberal
Jock Granter	Liberal	1985	Fred Grimwade	Liberal
Jock Granter	Liberal	1987	Marie Tehan	Liberal
Geoff Craige	Liberal	1988	Marie Tehan	Liberal
Geoff Craige	Liberal	1992	Graeme Stoney	Liberal
Geoff Craige	Liberal	1996	Graeme Stoney	Liberal
Geoff Craige	Liberal	1999	Graeme Stoney	Liberal
Rob Mitchell	Labor	2002	Graeme Stoney	Liberal

== Election results ==
=== Elections in the 2000s ===
2002 Victorian state election: Central Highlands Province
Party	Candidate	Votes	%	±%
Labor	Rob Mitchell	57,245	44.3	+1.1
Liberal	Cath Marriott	48,352	37.4	−16.6
Greens	Janet MacKenzie	12,206	9.4	+8.4
National	Rozi Parisotto	9,563	7.4	+6.5
Democrats	Jos Vandersman	1,925	1.5	+0.8
Total formal votes		129,291	96.7	−0.2
Informal votes		4,470	3.3	+0.2
Turnout		133,761	94.1	
Two-party-preferred result
Labor	Rob Mitchell	70,460	54.5	+9.8
Liberal	Cath Marriott	58,831	45.5	−9.8
Labor gain from Liberal		Swing	+9.8	

=== Elections in the 1990s ===
1999 Victorian state election Central Highlands Province
Party	Candidate	Votes	%	±%
Liberal	Graeme Stoney	70,353	53.3	−0.8
Labor	Rob Mitchell	61,686	46.7	+8.9
Total formal votes		132,039	96.8	−0.9
Informal votes		4,368	3.2	+0.9
Turnout		136,407	94.2	
Liberal hold		Swing	−4.3	

1996 Victorian state election: Central Highlands Province
Party	Candidate	Votes	%	±%
Liberal	Geoff Craige	68,100	54.1	−4.4
Labor	Geoff Cooper	47,608	37.8	+2.3
Democrats	Ray Doensen	7,904	6.3	+6.3
Democratic Labor	Christian Schalken	2,248	1.8	−4.2
Total formal votes		125,860	97.7	+1.0
Informal votes		2,951	2.3	−1.0
Turnout		128,811	95.0	
Two-party-preferred result
Liberal	Geoff Craige	72,329	57.6	−3.3
Labor	Geoff Cooper	53,259	42.4	+3.3
Liberal hold		Swing	−3.3	

1992 Victorian state election: Central Highlands Province
Party	Candidate	Votes	%	±%
Liberal	Graeme Stoney	69,009	58.5	+18.8
Labor	Janet Kaylock	41,891	35.5	−8.2
Democratic Labor	Rosemary Maurus	7,072	6.0	+6.0
Total formal votes		117,972	96.7	−0.1
Informal votes		4,040	3.3	+0.1
Turnout		122,012	96.3	
Two-party-preferred result
Liberal	Graeme Stoney	71,733	60.9	+7.7
Labor	Janet Kaylock	46,099	39.1	−7.7
Liberal hold		Swing	+7.7	

=== Elections in the 1980s ===
1988 Victorian state election: Central Highlands Province
Party	Candidate	Votes	%	±%
Labor	Andre Haermeyer	54,233	45.2	+2.6
Liberal	Geoff Craige	49,442	41.2	−5.5
National	Ted Drane	16,319	13.6	+13.6
Total formal votes		119,994	96.9	−0.8
Informal votes		3,876	3.1	+0.8
Turnout		123,870	93.2	−0.1
Two-party-preferred result
Liberal	Geoff Craige	62,153	51.8	−1.5
Labor	Andre Haermeyer	50,958	48.2	+1.5
Liberal hold		Swing	−1.5	

1987 Central Highlands Province state by-election
Party	Candidate	Votes	%	±%
Liberal	Marie Tehan	43,983	42.7	−4.0
Labor	Bernard O'Brien	36,932	35.9	−10.8
National	Kenneth Adamson	10,491	10.2	+10.2
Democrats	John Benton	5,280	5.1	−0.3
Independent	John Easton	3,453	3.4	+3.4
Democratic Labor	Francis Feltham	1,921	1.9	+1.9
Independent	Brian Lumsden	946	0.9	+0.9
Total formal votes		103,066	97.1	−0.6
Informal votes		3,105	2.9	+0.6
Turnout		106,111	86.3	−7.0
Two-party-preferred result
Liberal	Marie Tehan	60,077	58.4	+5.1
Labor	Bernard O'Brien	42,870	41.6	−5.1
Liberal hold		Swing	+5.1	

1985 Victorian state election: Central Highlands Province
Party	Candidate	Votes	%	±%
Liberal	Fred Grimwade	51,045	46.7	
Labor	Peter Fennell	46,570	42.6	
Democrats	Janet Powell	5,920	5.4	
Call to Australia	Brent Melville	5,763	5.3	
Total formal votes		109,298	97.7	
Informal votes		2,622	2.3	
Turnout		111,920	93.3	
Two-party-preferred result
Liberal	Fred Grimwade	58,298	53.3	+2.4
Labor	Peter Fennell	50,958	46.7	−2.4
Liberal hold		Swing	+2.4	

1982 Victorian state election: Central Highlands Province
Party	Candidate	Votes	%	±%
Labor	Anthony Marshall	43,119	44.2	−0.8
Liberal	Jock Granter	42,521	43.6	−11.4
National	Brian Trewin	6,162	6.3	+6.3
Democrats	David Johnston	5,771	5.9	+5.9
Total formal votes		97,573	97.6	+0.5
Informal votes		2,429	2.4	−0.5
Turnout		100,002	93.2	+0.7
Two-party-preferred result
Liberal	Jock Granter	49,655	50.9	−4.1
Labor	Anthony Marshall	47,918	49.1	+4.1
Liberal hold		Swing	−4.1	

=== Elections in the 1970s ===
1979 Victorian state election: Central Highlands Province
Party	Candidate	Votes	%	±%
Liberal	Fred Grimwade	47,916	55.0	+5.7
Labor	Max McDonald	39,138	45.0	+8.7
Total formal votes		87,054	97.1	−0.3
Informal votes		2,039	2.5	+0.3
Turnout		89,666	92.5	+0.4
Liberal hold		Swing	−5.7	

1976 Victorian state election: Central Highlands Province
Party	Candidate	Votes	%	±%
Liberal	Jock Granter	37,876	49.3	
Labor	Max McDonald	27,876	36.3	
National	Pat McNamara	8,465	11.0	
Independent	Peter Brown	2,611	3.4	
Total formal votes		76,828	97.4	
Informal votes		2,048	2.6	
Turnout		78,876	92.1	
Two-party-preferred result
Liberal	Jock Granter		60.7	
Labor	Max McDonald		39.3	
Liberal hold		Swing		

- Two party preferred vote was estimated.
