= Electoral results for the Division of McEwen =

Election results for McEwan, Victoria, Australia

McEwen, an Australian Electoral Division in the Australian state of Victoria, has existed since 1984.

== Members ==
Election	Member	Party
1984	Peter Cleeland	Labor
1987	Peter Cleeland	Labor
1990	Fran Bailey	Liberal
1993	Peter Cleeland	Labor
1996	Fran Bailey	Liberal
1998	Fran Bailey	Liberal
2001	Fran Bailey	Liberal
2004	Fran Bailey	Liberal
2007	Fran Bailey	Liberal
2010	Rob Mitchell	Labor
2013	Rob Mitchell	Labor
2016	Rob Mitchell	Labor
2019	Rob Mitchell	Labor
2022	Rob Mitchell	Labor
2025	Rob Mitchell	Labor

== Election results ==
=== Elections in the 2020s ===
==== 2025 ====
2025 Australian federal election: McEwen
Party	Candidate	Votes	%	±%
Labor	Rob Mitchell	39,079	37.35	+0.13
Liberal	Jason McClintock	34,023	32.52	−0.24
Greens	Marley McRae McLeod	11,611	11.10	−2.95
One Nation	Jeremy Johnson	6,869	6.57	+0.99
Legalise Cannabis	Tom Forrest	4,057	3.88	+3.88
People First	Ali Antoniou	3,538	3.38	+3.38
Family First	Julio Valencia	2,499	2.39	+2.39
Animal Justice	Chloe Nicolosi	2,100	2.01	+2.01
Fusion	Erin McGrath	840	0.80	+0.80
Total formal votes		104,616	94.84	−1.18
Informal votes		5,691	5.16	+1.18
Turnout		110,307	93.53	+9.10
Two-party-preferred result
Labor	Rob Mitchell	57,288	54.76	+0.94
Liberal	Jason McClintock	47,328	45.24	−0.94
Labor hold		Swing	+0.94	

==== 2022 ====
2022 Australian federal election: McEwen
Party	Candidate	Votes	%	±%
Labor	Rob Mitchell	35,238	36.81	−2.98
Liberal	Richard Welch	31,796	33.22	−1.77
Greens	Neil Barker	13,524	14.13	+4.66
United Australia	Paul McRae	5,474	5.72	+2.46
One Nation	Chris Bradbury	5,387	5.63	+0.51
Liberal Democrats	John Herron	2,579	2.69	+2.69
Federation	Christopher Neil	1,721	1.80	+1.80
Total formal votes		95,719	96.07	+1.01
Informal votes		3,918	3.93	−1.01
Turnout		99,637	92.23	+0.07
Two-party-preferred result
Labor	Rob Mitchell	50,998	53.28	−2.00
Liberal	Richard Welch	44,721	46.72	+2.00
Labor hold		Swing	−2.00	

Alluvial diagram for preference flows in the seat of McEwen in the 2022 federal election. indicates at what stage the winning candidate had over 50% of the votes and was declared the winner.

=== Elections in the 2010s ===
==== 2019 ====
2019 Australian federal election: McEwen
Party	Candidate	Votes	%	±%
Labor	Rob Mitchell	37,911	39.44	−2.77
Liberal	Phillip Fusco	33,162	34.50	−1.32
Greens	Neil Barker	8,026	8.35	−0.24
One Nation	Ronnie Graham	5,693	5.92	+5.92
Justice	Deb Butler	3,878	4.03	+4.03
United Australia	Chris Hayman	3,016	3.14	+3.14
Animal Justice	Ruth Parramore	2,890	3.01	+0.17
Independent	Robert Hyndman	1,552	1.61	+1.61
Total formal votes		96,128	94.74	+0.31
Informal votes		5,334	5.26	−0.31
Turnout		101,462	93.91	+4.20
Two-party-preferred result
Labor	Rob Mitchell	52,892	55.02	−0.98
Liberal	Phillip Fusco	43,236	44.98	+0.98
Labor hold		Swing	−0.98	

==== 2016 ====
2016 Australian federal election: McEwen
Party	Candidate	Votes	%	±%
Labor	Rob Mitchell	50,588	44.69	+7.07
Liberal	Chris Jermyn	38,151	33.70	−6.64
Greens	Neil Barker	8,583	7.58	+0.48
Family First	Dorothy Long	3,707	3.27	+0.40
Independent	Ross Lee	3,013	2.66	+2.66
Animal Justice	Cathy Vaina	3,005	2.65	+2.65
National	James Anderson	2,672	2.36	+2.36
Rise Up Australia	Jeff Truscott	1,867	1.65	+1.19
Country	Tracey Andrew	1,614	1.43	+0.75
Total formal votes		113,200	94.03	−1.35
Informal votes		7,189	5.97	+1.35
Turnout		120,389	92.17	−2.62
Two-party-preferred result
Labor	Rob Mitchell	65,482	57.85	+7.70
Liberal	Chris Jermyn	47,718	42.15	−7.70
Labor hold		Swing	+7.70	

==== 2013 ====
2013 Australian federal election: McEwen
Party	Candidate	Votes	%	±%
Liberal	Donna Petrovich	40,853	40.34	+4.11
Labor	Rob Mitchell	38,091	37.62	−10.19
Greens	Neil Barker	7,187	7.10	−3.59
Palmer United	Trevor Dance	6,822	6.74	+6.74
Sex Party	Victoria Nash	3,256	3.22	+3.22
Family First	Barry Newton	2,906	2.87	−0.87
Katter's Australian	Bruce Stevens	997	0.98	+0.98
Country Alliance	Ian Cranson	686	0.68	+0.68
Rise Up Australia	Ferdie Verdan	463	0.46	+0.46
Total formal votes		101,261	95.38	+0.21
Informal votes		4,910	4.62	−0.21
Turnout		106,171	94.83	−1.81
Two-party-preferred result
Labor	Rob Mitchell	50,787	50.15	−9.04
Liberal	Donna Petrovich	50,474	49.85	+9.04
Labor hold		Swing	−9.04	

==== 2010 ====
2010 Australian federal election: McEwen
Party	Candidate	Votes	%	±%
Labor	Rob Mitchell	45,374	43.17	+2.97
Liberal	Cameron Caine	42,054	40.01	−5.76
Greens	Steve Meacher	12,440	11.84	+3.16
Family First	Belinda Clarkson	3,358	3.19	+0.70
Liberal Democrats	Mark Bini	1,332	1.27	+0.44
Secular	Robert Gordon	549	0.52	+0.52
Total formal votes		105,107	95.60	−0.44
Informal votes		4,843	4.40	+0.44
Turnout		109,950	94.96	−1.28
Two-party-preferred result
Labor	Rob Mitchell	58,144	55.32	+5.34
Liberal	Cameron Caine	46,963	44.68	−5.34
Labor gain from Liberal		Swing	+5.34	

=== Elections in the 2000s ===
==== 2007 ====
2007 Australian federal election: McEwen (Note: The AEC results have been used, however they do not correspond with the tally set out in paragraph 84 of the reasons for judgment of the Court of Disputed Returns in Mitchell v Bailey (No.2) [2008] FCA 692.)
Party	Candidate	Votes	%	±%
Liberal	Fran Bailey	44,231	45.77	−5.97
Labor	Rob Mitchell	38,856	40.20	+5.65
Greens	Steve Meacher	8,387	8.68	+1.03
Family First	Ian Cranson	2,404	2.49	+0.77
Democrats	David Kane	951	0.98	+0.16
Independent	Darren Trueman	850	0.88	+0.88
Liberty & Democracy	Robert Newnham	806	0.83	+0.83
Citizens Electoral Council	Rod McLennan	162	0.17	−0.05
Total formal votes		96,647	96.04	+0.70
Informal votes		3,987	3.96	−0.70
Turnout		100,634	96.24	+0.13
Two-party-preferred result
Liberal	Fran Bailey	48,339	50.02	−6.40
Labor	Rob Mitchell	48,308	49.98	+6.40
Liberal hold		Swing	−6.40	

Rob Mitchell (Labor) was initially announced as the winning candidate, by a mere seven votes. The first recount reduced this margin to five. The second re-count overturned the result with Fran Bailey (Liberal) instead winning by 12 votes. The Court of Disputed Returns later increased this margin to 27 votes.

==== 2004 ====
2004 Australian federal election: McEwen
Party	Candidate	Votes	%	±%
Liberal	Fran Bailey	45,230	51.74	+5.18
Labor	Jenny Beales	30,205	34.55	−2.81
Greens	Megan Hannes-Paterson	6,686	7.65	+0.41
Independent	Robert Gordon	2,220	2.54	+2.54
Family First	Mark Sach	1,500	1.72	+1.72
Democrats	Marj White	713	0.82	−4.64
Independent	Damon Gordon Lutz	398	0.46	+0.46
Independent	Maurie Smith	278	0.32	+0.32
Citizens Electoral Council	Rod McLennan	188	0.22	+0.22
Total formal votes		87,418	95.34	−1.08
Informal votes		4,273	4.66	+1.08
Turnout		91,691	96.11	+0.34
Two-party-preferred result
Liberal	Fran Bailey	49,322	56.42	+4.10
Labor	Jenny Beales	38,096	43.58	−4.10
Liberal hold		Swing	+4.10	

==== 2001 ====
2001 Australian federal election: McEwen
Party	Candidate	Votes	%	±%
Liberal	Fran Bailey	37,963	46.01	+2.55
Labor	Andrew MacLeod	31,986	38.76	−1.27
Greens	Jim Romagnesi	5,006	6.07	+3.40
Democrats	Tony Carden	3,986	4.83	+0.01
One Nation	Alan Salter	2,448	2.97	−2.15
Independent	Bill Lodwick	1,129	1.37	+1.37
Total formal votes		82,518	96.19	−0.47
Informal votes		3,272	3.81	+0.47
Turnout		85,790	97.24	
Two-party-preferred result
Liberal	Fran Bailey	42,249	51.20	+0.16
Labor	Andrew MacLeod	40,269	48.80	−0.16
Liberal hold		Swing	+0.16	

=== Elections in the 1990s ===
==== 1998 ====
1998 Australian federal election: McEwen
Party	Candidate	Votes	%	±%
Liberal	Fran Bailey	32,951	43.46	−2.67
Labor	Graeme McEwen	30,350	40.03	+0.93
One Nation	Dennis Lacey	3,877	5.11	+5.11
Democrats	Sean Carter	3,652	4.82	−1.45
Greens	Pam Lawson	2,020	2.66	−1.24
Shooters	Vicki Treble	1,808	2.38	+2.38
Independent	Stephen Bowden	611	0.81	+0.81
Independent	Elizabeth Savage Kooroonya	363	0.48	+0.48
Natural Law	Susan Brown	186	0.25	−0.15
Total formal votes		75,818	96.66	−0.80
Informal votes		2,623	3.34	+0.80
Turnout		78,441	96.17	−0.56
Two-party-preferred result
Liberal	Fran Bailey	38,699	51.04	−1.13
Labor	Graeme McEwen	37,119	48.96	+1.13
Liberal hold		Swing	−1.13	

==== 1996 ====
1996 Australian federal election: McEwen
Party	Candidate	Votes	%	±%
Liberal	Fran Bailey	33,637	46.13	−2.08
Labor	Peter Cleeland	28,516	39.10	−4.36
Democrats	David Zemdegs	4,571	6.27	+1.50
Greens	Chris James	2,843	3.90	+3.90
AAFI	Rick Lloyd	2,235	3.06	+3.05
Independent	Jock Kyme	835	1.15	+1.15
Natural Law	Martin Magee	285	0.39	−0.74
Total formal votes		72,922	97.45	+0.08
Informal votes		1,905	2.55	−0.08
Turnout		74,827	96.74	+0.32
Two-party-preferred result
Liberal	Fran Bailey	37,845	52.18	+1.50
Labor	Peter Cleeland	34,689	47.82	−1.50
Liberal hold		Swing	+1.50	

==== 1993 ====
1993 Australian federal election: McEwen
Party	Candidate	Votes	%	±%
Liberal	Fran Bailey	35,549	46.96	+0.12
Labor	Peter Cleeland	34,320	45.34	+7.04
Democrats	Geoff Mosley	3,022	3.99	−6.37
Independent	Harry Grey	2,148	2.84	+2.84
Natural Law	Julie Nihill	655	0.87	+0.87
Total formal votes		75,694	97.35	+0.10
Informal votes		2,064	2.65	−0.10
Turnout		77,758	96.42	
Two-party-preferred result
Labor	Peter Cleeland	38,347	50.69	+3.90
Liberal	Fran Bailey	37,307	49.31	−3.90
Labor gain from Liberal		Swing	+3.90	

==== 1990 ====
1990 Australian federal election: McEwen
Party	Candidate	Votes	%	±%
Liberal	Fran Bailey	31,323	46.8	+7.1
Labor	Peter Cleeland	25,610	38.3	−8.0
Democrats	Russell Dawes	6,928	10.4	+3.3
Call to Australia	Win Wise	1,630	2.4	+2.4
Independent	Maurie Smith	1,381	2.1	+2.1
Total formal votes		66,872	97.2	
Informal votes		1,894	2.8	
Turnout		68,766	95.7	
Two-party-preferred result
Liberal	Fran Bailey	35,543	53.2	+6.1
Labor	Peter Cleeland	31,256	46.8	−6.1
Liberal gain from Labor		Swing	+6.1	

=== Elections in the 1980s ===
==== 1987 ====
1987 Australian federal election: McEwen
Party	Candidate	Votes	%	±%
Labor	Peter Cleeland	31,052	48.5	+1.5
Liberal	David Millie	24,021	37.5	+0.7
Democrats	Doug Lorman	4,551	7.1	+0.7
National	Andrew Coller	4,038	6.3	−2.0
Independent	Robert Wilson	369	0.6	+0.6
Total formal votes		64,031	95.8	
Informal votes		2,804	4.2	
Turnout		66,835	96.2	
Two-party-preferred result
Labor	Peter Cleeland	34,605	54.1	+2.0
Liberal	David Millie	29,397	45.9	−2.0
Labor hold		Swing	+2.0	

==== 1984 ====
1984 Australian federal election: McEwen
Party	Candidate	Votes	%	±%
Labor	Peter Cleeland	25,984	47.0	−1.4
Liberal	Brian Dixon	20,331	36.8	−3.1
National	John Brewster	4,571	8.3	+3.5
Democrats	Julie Stayner	3,547	6.4	+1.2
Democratic Labor	Daniel Mason	853	1.5	+1.5
Total formal votes		55,286	92.4	
Informal votes		4,559	7.6	
Turnout		59,845	95.4	
Two-party-preferred result
Labor	Peter Cleeland	28,789	52.1	+0.3
Liberal	Brian Dixon	26,483	47.9	−0.3
Labor hold		Swing	+0.3	
