= Electoral results for the district of Seymour =

Victoria, Australia, district election results

This is a list of electoral results for the Electoral district of Seymour in Victorian state elections.

== Members for Seymour ==
Member	Party	Term
Marie Tehan	Liberal	1992–1999
Ben Hardman	Labor	1999–2010
Cindy McLeish	Liberal	2010–2014

== Election results ==
=== Elections in the 2010s ===
2010 Victorian state election: Seymour
Party	Candidate	Votes	%	±%
Liberal	Cindy McLeish	12,992	35.63	−2.80
Labor	Ben Hardman	12,813	35.14	−11.28
Independent	Jan Beer	3,738	10.25	+10.25
Greens	Huw Slater	3,230	8.86	−0.47
Country Alliance	Adam Taurian	1,587	4.35	+4.35
National	Anthony Rolando	1,391	3.81	+3.81
Family First	Robert Guerra	711	1.95	−1.38
Total formal votes		36,462	94.91	−1.21
Informal votes		1,955	5.09	+1.21
Turnout		38,417	93.47	−0.55
Two-party-preferred result
Liberal	Cindy McLeish	18,728	51.25	+8.07
Labor	Ben Hardman	17,811	48.75	−8.07
Liberal gain from Labor		Swing	+8.07	

=== Elections in the 2000s ===
2006 Victorian state election: Seymour
Party	Candidate	Votes	%	±%
Labor	Ben Hardman	15,987	46.4	−6.1
Liberal	Mike Dalmau	13,237	38.4	+0.6
Greens	Sean O'Sullivan	3,213	9.3	−0.4
Family First	Josh Dolan	1,148	3.3	+3.3
People Power	Robert Gordon	858	2.5	+2.5
Total formal votes		34,443	96.1	−1.4
Informal votes		1,390	3.9	+1.4
Turnout		35,833	94.0	
Two-party-preferred result
Labor	Ben Hardman	19,517	56.7	−2.8
Liberal	Mike Dalmau	14,926	43.3	+2.8
Labor hold		Swing	−2.8	

2002 Victorian state election: Seymour
Party	Candidate	Votes	%	±%
Labor	Ben Hardman	17,143	52.5	+6.1
Liberal	Mike Dalmau	12,350	37.8	−5.2
Greens	Chelsea McNab	3,178	9.7	+4.7
Total formal votes		32,671	97.5	+0.3
Informal votes		836	2.5	−0.3
Turnout		33,507	94.2	
Two-party-preferred result
Labor	Ben Hardman	19,434	59.5	+9.4
Liberal	Mike Dalmau	13,236	40.5	−9.4
Labor hold		Swing	+9.4	

=== Elections in the 1990s ===
1999 Victorian state election: Seymour
Party	Candidate	Votes	%	±%
Liberal	Di Rule	15,675	47.7	−4.8
Labor	Ben Hardman	15,410	46.9	+2.9
Greens	Jim Romagnesi	1,797	5.5	+5.5
Total formal votes		32,882	97.4	−0.7
Informal votes		879	2.6	+0.7
Turnout		33,761	94.5	
Two-party-preferred result
Labor	Ben Hardman	16,672	50.7	+4.9
Liberal	Di Rule	16,210	49.3	−4.9
Labor gain from Liberal		Swing	+4.9	

1996 Victorian state election: Seymour
Party	Candidate	Votes	%	±%
Liberal	Marie Tehan	16,301	52.5	+5.2
Labor	Ben Hardman	13,655	44.0	+10.8
Natural Law	Frances Clarke	1,103	3.6	+3.6
Total formal votes		31,059	98.1	+1.2
Informal votes		606	1.9	−1.2
Turnout		31,665	95.0	
Two-party-preferred result
Liberal	Marie Tehan	16,810	54.2	−6.8
Labor	Ben Hardman	14,211	45.8	+6.8
Liberal hold		Swing	−6.8	

1992 Victorian state election: Seymour
Party	Candidate	Votes	%	±%
Liberal	Marie Tehan	13,869	47.3	+4.4
Labor	Ian Rogers	9,723	33.1	−12.8
National	Rod Henderson	3,332	11.4	+2.4
Pensioner and CIR	Jim McKinnon	1,213	4.1	+4.1
Independent	Maurie Smith	1,207	4.1	+4.1
Total formal votes		29,344	96.9	−0.3
Informal votes		944	3.1	+0.3
Turnout		30,288	95.6	
Two-party-preferred result
Liberal	Marie Tehan	17,821	61.0	+8.1
Labor	Ian Rogers	11,415	39.0	−8.1
Liberal hold		Swing	+8.1	
