= Geoff Craige =

Australian politician (born 1943)

Geoffrey Ronald (Geoff) Craige (born 20 May 1943) is an Australian politician. He was a Liberal Party member of the Victorian Legislative Council from 1988 to 2002, representing Central Highlands Province. He served as Minister for Roads and Ports in the second term of the Kennett government.

Craige was born at Port Lincoln in South Australia, and was educated at Port Lincoln High School. He served in the Royal Australian Navy from 1961 to 1980, becoming a chief petty officer in the navy's medical branch. He then served as an organiser for the Federated Clerks' Union from 1980 to 1984, and was director of industrial relations for the Victorian Farmers Federation from 1984 until his election to parliament in 1988.

Craige was elected to the Legislative Council at the 1988 state election, succeeding retiring MP Jock Granter in the safe Liberal seat of Central Highlands Province. He was appointed parliamentary secretary to the Minister for Public Transport when the Liberal Party won office under Jeff Kennett in 1992. Craige was promoted to Minister for Roads and Ports in 1996, serving until the defeat of the Liberal government at the 1999 election. He unsuccessfully nominated for the position of Liberal deputy leader in the Legislative Council following the 1999 election loss, losing to Bill Forwood. He subsequently served as Shadow Minister for Manufacturing and Regional Business and Shadow Minister for Ports, before standing down from the shadow ministry in June 2000. He retired at the 2002 election.

After politics, Craige was a founder of fishing lobby group VRFish, worked for the Bus Association of Victoria, and served on the board of the Port of Hastings Development Authority.

Victorian Legislative Council
Preceded by Jock Granter	Member for Central Highlands Province; 1988–2002; With: Marie Tehan, Graeme Stoney	Succeeded by Rob Mitchell
