= College of Arts, Law and Education (University of Tasmania) =

College of the University of Tasmania

Coordinates: 42°54′17″S 147°19′22″E

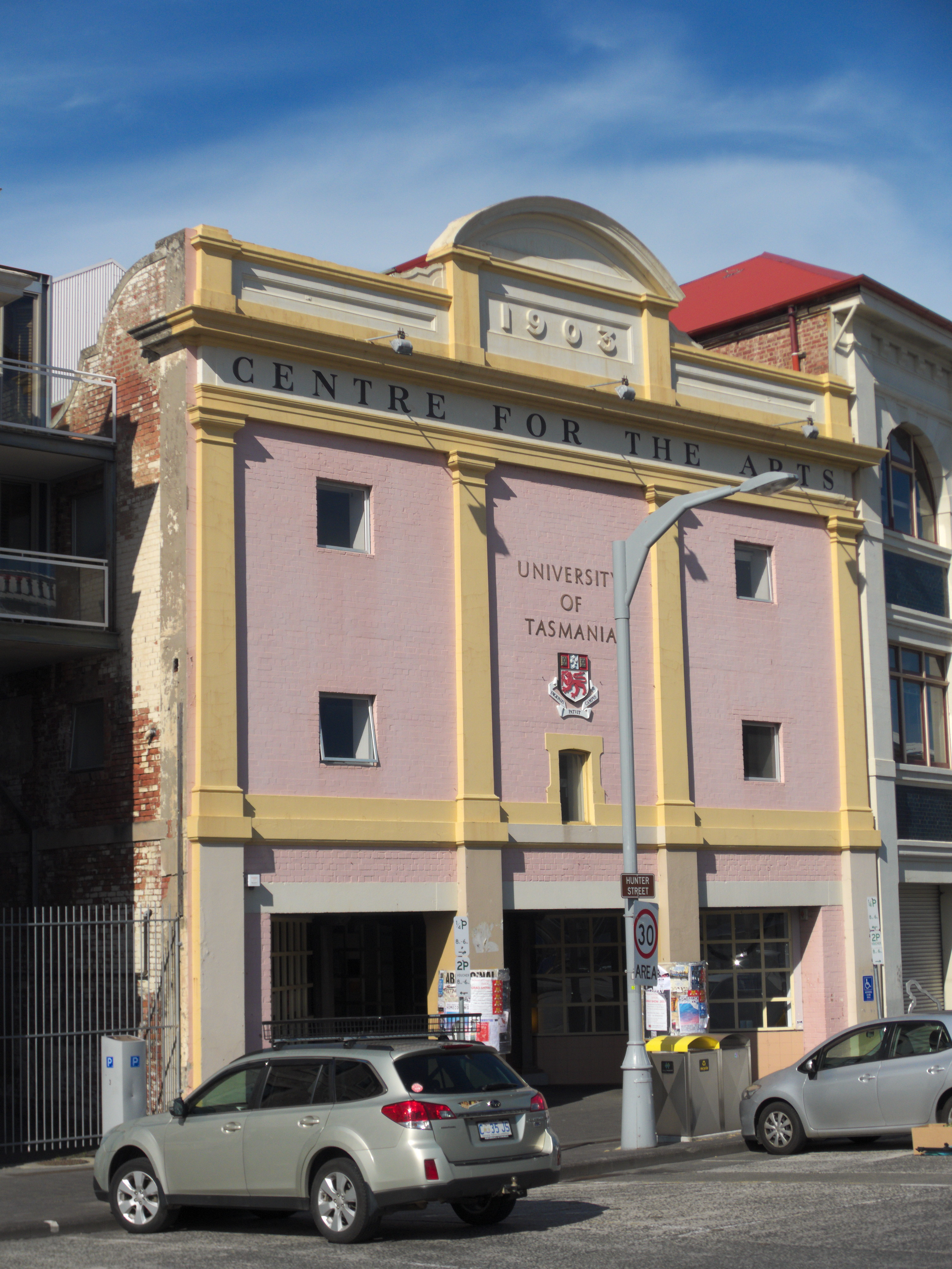
- Type: Public
- Established: 2017 as the College; 1890 as the Faculty of Arts; 1893 as the Law School
- Parent institution: University of Tasmania
- Vice-Chancellor: Rufus Black
- Dean and Pro-Vice Chancellor: Kate Darian-Smith
- Location: Hobart, Launceston and Burnie, Tasmania, Australia
- Campus: Urban
- Website: utas.edu.au/arts-law-education

The College of Arts, Law and Education was founded in 2017 as a college of the University of Tasmania that incorporated the School of Humanities, the School of Social Sciences, the School of Creative Arts (formerly the Tasmanian College of the Arts) and the Faculties of Law and Education. The College offers undergraduate, postgraduate and research programs.

The Colleges hosts a number of institutes including the Institute for the Study of Social Change, the Tasmanian Law Reform Institute, and the Asia Institute Tasmania.

== History ==
The College was established in March 2017 after the merging of the School of Humanities, the School of Social Sciences, the School of Creative Arts (formerly the Tasmanian College of the Arts) and the Faculties of Law and Education as a single entity. The College model followed other Australian Universities in the combining of academic units to promote further interdisciplinary teaching and research as well as a streamlined administrative process.

== Schools and Faculties ==
The College hosts five schools and facilitates which offers undergraduate, postgraduate and research programs.

=== School of Creative Arts and Media ===
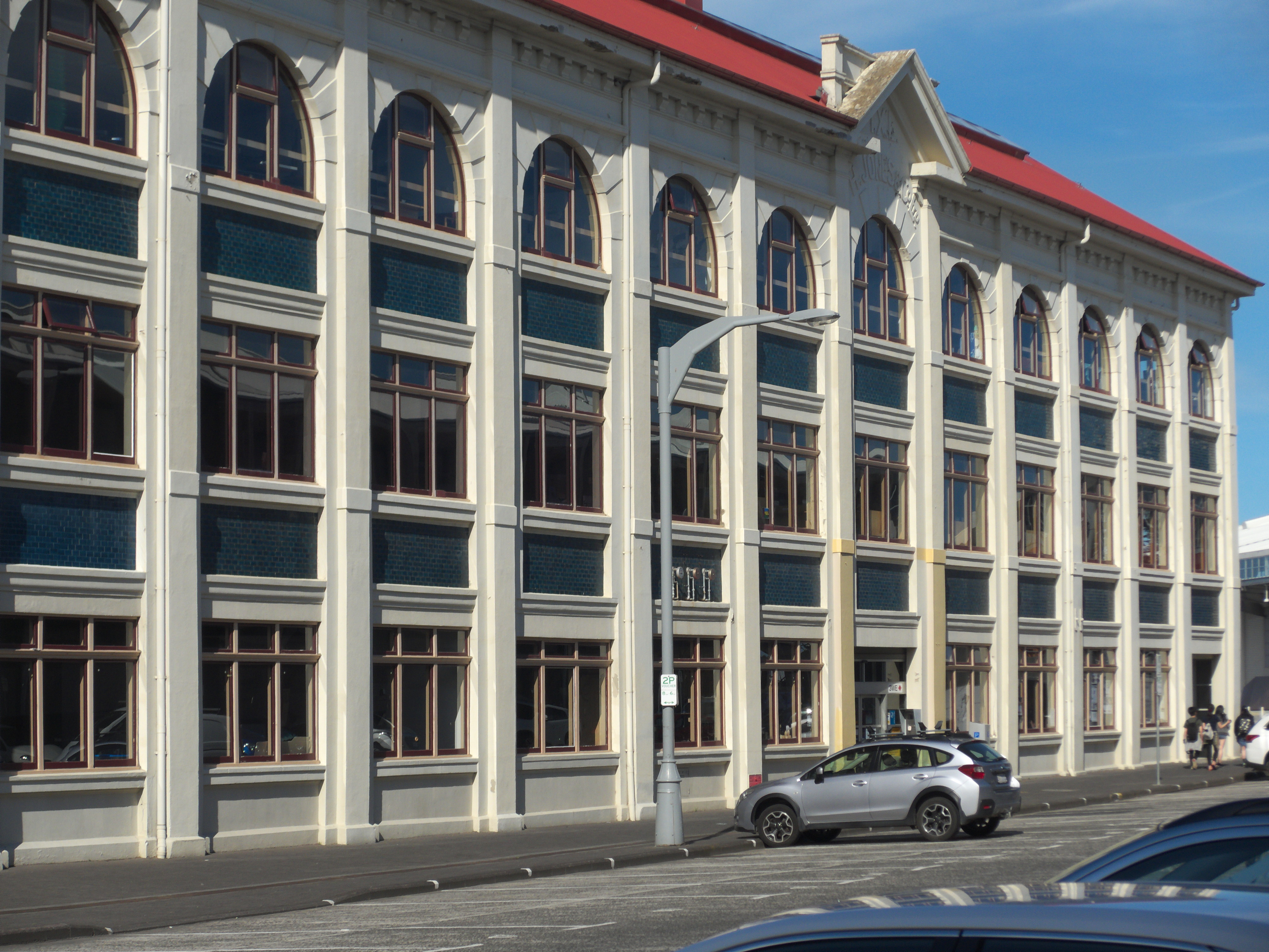
The Hunter Street Campus (Hobart) of the School of Creative Arts & Media

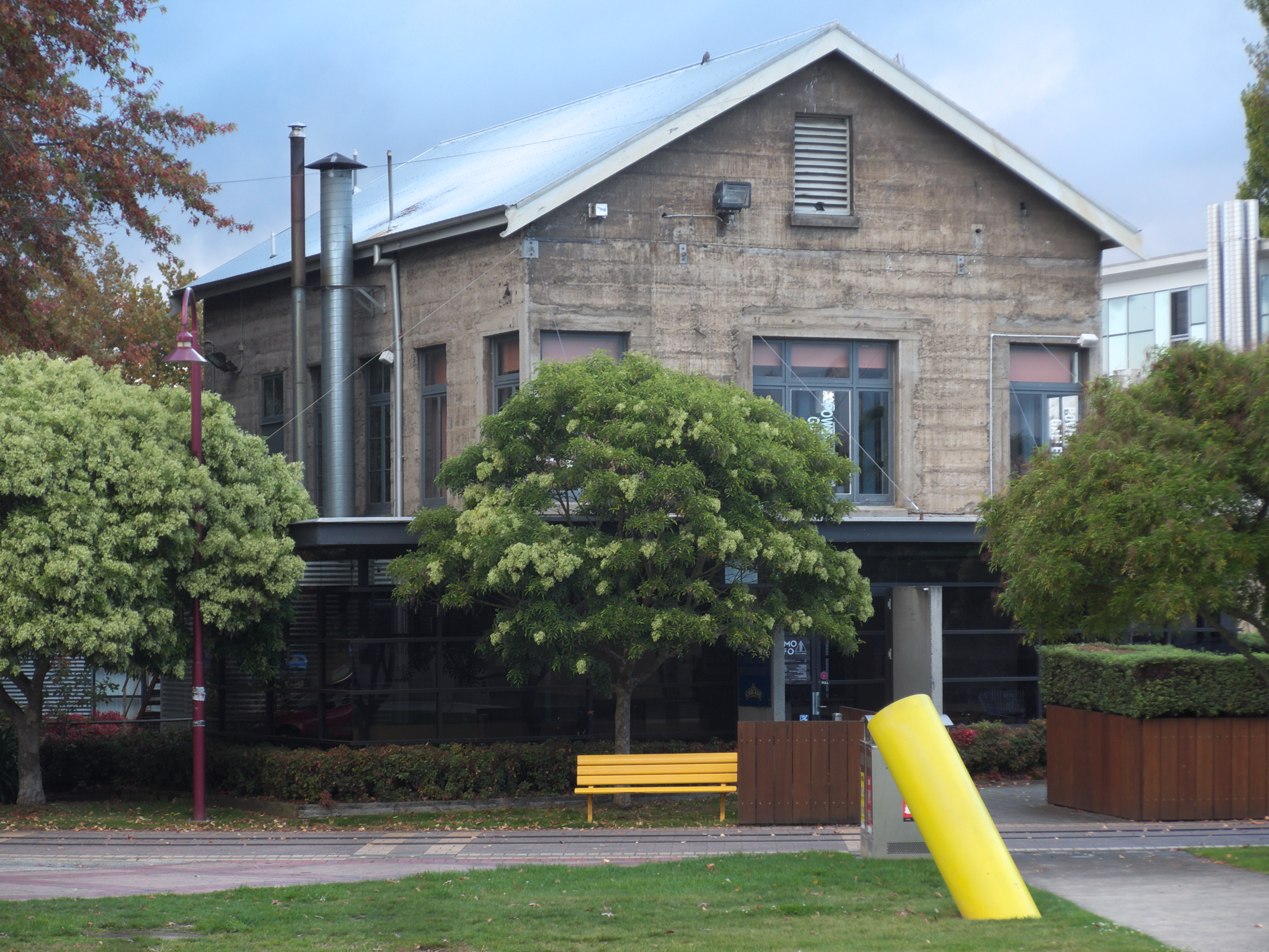
The Powerhouse House Gallery at the Universities Inveresk Campus (Launceston)

The School of Creative Arts offers Art and Design, Media, Music and Theatre and Performance studies and research curricula. The School operates five Gallery spaces across Tasmania, the Plimsoll Gallery and the Entrepôt Gallery based at the School's Hunter Street Campus in Hobart, the Academy Gallery and Powerhouse Gallery in Launceston, and the Makers' Space Gallery in Burnie.

Research centres and Institutes

- Australian Music and Art Research Group

=== School of Humanities ===
The School of Humanities focuses on the study and research of English, Global Cultures and Languages, History and Classics, and Philosophy and Gender Studies. Much of the School's research is significantly focused on the Universities 'Creativity, Culture and Society' research theme.

Research centres and Institutes

- Asia Institute Tasmania
- Institute for the Study of Social Change
- Centre for Tasmanian Historical Studies (CTHS)
- Experimental Histories Research Group
- Oceanic Cultures and Connections Research Group
- Antarctic Engagements Research Group
- Environmental Change Research Group
- Animal Studies Research Group

=== Faculty of Law ===
The Faculty of Law (formally the School of Law) was founded in 1893 and is the fourth oldest law school in Australia. The University of Tasmania Law Review and the Journal of Law, Information and Science are based within the Faculty as well as numerous publications produced by the Tasmanian Law Reform Institute.

In addition to its academic programme, the law faculty promotes a range of co-curricular activities including mooting, negotiation and client interview competitions, membership of the University of Tasmania Law Review student editorial, and membership of law students' societies the Tasmania University Law Society (TULS) and the Student Environment and Animal Law Society (SEALS) which provides opportunities for law students to become engaged in environmental law in such a way which encourages the building of legal skills and professional connections.

Research centres and Institutes

- Australian Forum for Climate Intervention Governance
- Tasmania Law Reform Institute
- Centre for Law and Genetics
- Climate Justice Network
- Journal of Law, Information and Science
- University of Tasmania Law Review

=== School of Social Sciences ===
The School of Social Sciences focuses on Political Science, International Relations, Social Work Sociology and Criminology. The School's research focus has been assessed at world-class and above world standards levels.

- Tasmanian Institute of Law Enforcement Studies (TILES)
- Housing and Community Research Unit (HACRU]
- Criminology Research Unit(CRU)
- Criminology, Law and Police Studies Research Group (CLPS)
- Disaster Resilience Research Group
- Future Energy Research Group

== Notable alumni ==
=== Judges ===
- Sir Stanley Burbury, KCMG, KCVO, KBE, Chief Justice of Tasmania 1956–1973
- Ewan Crawford, former Chief Justice and Lieutenant-Governor of Tasmania
- Sir William Lambert Dobson, KCMG, FLS, Chief Justice of Tasmania 1885–1898
- Sir John Stokell Dodds, KCMG, Chief Justice of Tasmania 1898–1914
- Stephen Estcourt QC, Tasmanian Supreme Court judge
- Philip Lewis Griffiths, former Chief Judge of the Mandated Territory of New Guinea
- Peter Heerey AM, QC, former Judge of the Federal Court of Australia
- Duncan Kerr, Judge of the Federal Court of Australia, President of the Administrative Appeals Tribunal and former Attorney-General of Australia
- Davendra Pathik, former Judge of the Supreme Court of Fiji
- Barbara Baker, Governor of Tasmania and former Judge of the Federal Circuit Court of Australia

=== Legal practitioners ===
- Damian Bugg, former Commonwealth and Tasmanian Director of Public Prosecutions
- Michael Mansell, Aboriginal rights activist and lawyer

=== Legal academics ===
- Enid Campbell AC, former Dean of Monash University Faculty of Law and first female law professor in Australasia
- Kate Warner AM, legal academic and former Governor of Tasmania

=== Politics and government ===
- Eric Abetz, Senator for Tasmania
- Guy Barnett, Senator for Tasmania
- David Bushby, Chief Government Whip in the Senate
- Roy Fagan, former Deputy Premier of Tasmania
- Adrian Gibson OAM, former Liberal politician and barrister
- Lara Giddings, Labor politician and former Premier of Tasmania
- Bill Hodgman, OBE, QC, former President of the Tasmanian Legislative Council
- Michael Hodgman AM, QC, former Liberal politician and barrister
- Will Hodgman, Premier of Tasmania
- Michael Tate, former Labor politician and diplomat, legal academic and Catholic priest
- Peter Underwood, former Governor of Tasmania
- Hannah Yeoh, speaker of the Selangor State Legislative Assembly

=== Diplomacy ===
- Ralph Harry AC, CBE, Diplomat and former Ambassador to the United Nations

=== Business ===
- Andrew MacLeod, businessman, author, former humanitarian lawyer and aid worker
