= Jock Granter =

Australian politician (1921–2012)

Frederick James "Jock" Granter (6 March 1921 – 14 May 2012) was an Australian politician.

Granter was born in Gardenvale to estate agent Donald Frederick Forster Granter and his wife Marion. After attending Gardenvale Central School and Caulfield Grammar School he became a bank officer in 1938, and served in the AIF during World War II from 1941 to 1946. He married Helena Ferrier Thomas on 9 October 1949. In 1954 he changed careers, farming merino sheep in Heathcote, where he became active in the local Liberal Party.

In 1964 Granter was elected to the Victorian Legislative Council as the member for Bendigo, shifting to Central Highlands in 1976. From 21 June 1973 to 5 June 1981 he was Minister of Water Supply and Forests, moving to Police and Emergency Services 5 June 1981 to 8 April 1982. He retired from politics in 1988.

Victorian Legislative Council
Preceded by Arthur Smith	Member for Bendigo; 1964–1976; Served alongside: Thomas Grigg; Fred Grimwade	Succeeded by Bruce Reid
New seat	Member for Central Highlands; 1976–1988; Served alongside: Fred Grimwade; Marie Tehan	Succeeded by Geoff Craige
