= Arthur Smith (Australian politician) =

Australian politician

Arthur Smith (2 March 1902 – 9 October 1981) was a bricklayer, and a railways employee before becoming an Australian politician and Chief President of the Australian Natives' Association.

== Early years ==
Smith was born in Barwite to farmer Sidney Gordon Smith and Isabella Martin. He attended public schools at Barwite and Mansfield, and worked as a bricklayer and then a railway employee in Seymour. He was President Seymour branch of the Railway Institute.

On 1 December 1934 he married Margaret Breakwell, with whom he had two daughters.

== Australian Natives' Association ==
Arthur joined Seymour A.N.A. Branch No.136 in 1932. He attended his first A.N.A. Annual Conference at Mildura the same year. He was a regular delegate for Seymour Branch at annual conferences for the next 30 years, missing only 4 conferences in that time. Arthur was very well informed about the issues which were discussed. He was elected to the A.N.A. Board of Directors in 1956 and elected Chief President in 1958. At a reception at ANZAC Rooms, Seymour to celebrate his appointment as A.N.A. Chief President, Smith gave a warm tribute to his wife, Margaret for her great assistance to him in his role as Chief President. As Chief President he visited Western District Branches including Murtoa, Dimboola and Nhill, the first visits by an A.N.A. Chief President for many years.

In his Chief President's Address to Annual Conference at Lakes Entrance in 1959 he affirmed the restricted immigration policy and promoted the idea of an Australian film industry so that Australians would not have to view only pictures which “present a distorted view of a foreign way of life.” Arthur retired from the A.N.A. Board in 1967 due to ill health.

== Community ==
Smith actively served the community though being Chairman of the Seymour Memorial Hospital and Ambulance committee, a member of both the Seymour High School Council and State School committees; a Boy Scout commissioner for the Upper Murray region; a member Seymour Water Trust and Sewerage Authority; and Vice President of Upper Goulburn Weights and Measures Union;

== Politics ==
From 1948 to 1960 he served on Seymour Shire Council, of which he was president from 1955 to 1956.

In 1952 he was elected to the Victorian Legislative Council as a Labor Party member for Bendigo Province, where he served until his defeat in 1964.

== Later years ==
In 1967 he retired to Coffs Harbour. Smith died in Brisbane in 1981.

Victorian Legislative Council
Preceded by Sir George Lansell	Member for Bendigo; 1952–1964; Served alongside: Thomas Grigg	Succeeded by Jock Granter
