= George Lansell =

English-born Australian politician

Member of the Victorian Legislative Council for Bendigo
- In office 1 June 1928 – 1 June 1952
- Preceded by: Joseph Sternberg
- Succeeded by: Arthur Smith

Personal details
- Born: 3 October 1883 London, United Kingdom
- Died: 9 January 1959 (aged 75) Bendigo, Victoria, Australia
- Party: Nationalist, Country, Liberal and Country
- Spouse: Edith Florence Gwendoline Frew (m. 1910)
- Children: 3

Sir George Victor Lansell CMG VD (3 October 1883 – 9 January 1959) was an English-born Australian politician.

Lansell was born in London the elder son of mining entrepreneur of George Lansell (the Bendigo 'Quartz King'), and his second wife Harriet Edith, née Bassford.

He was educated at St Andrew's College, Bendigo and at Melbourne Grammar School, and in 1906 inherited his father's estate of £6 million. He owned the Bendigo Independent newspaper and merged it with the Bendigo Advertiser in 1918, and was chairman of a large number of media and other companies around regional Victoria.

During World War I he served in the AIF with the 38th Battalion, becoming a captain but being wounded on the Western Front. In 1923 he was awarded the Volunteer Decoration and promoted to commanding officer of his battalion; he was raised to the rank of lieutenant-colonel in 1927 and appointed a Companion of the Order of St Michael and St George in 1937.

In 1928 he had won election to the Victorian Legislative Council as a Nationalist member for Bendigo Province. In 1944 he defected to the Country Party, but he joined the Liberal and Country Party in 1949; he remained sympathetic to the Country Party government of John McDonald. Lansell was knighted in 1951, but lost his seat in the council in June the following year.

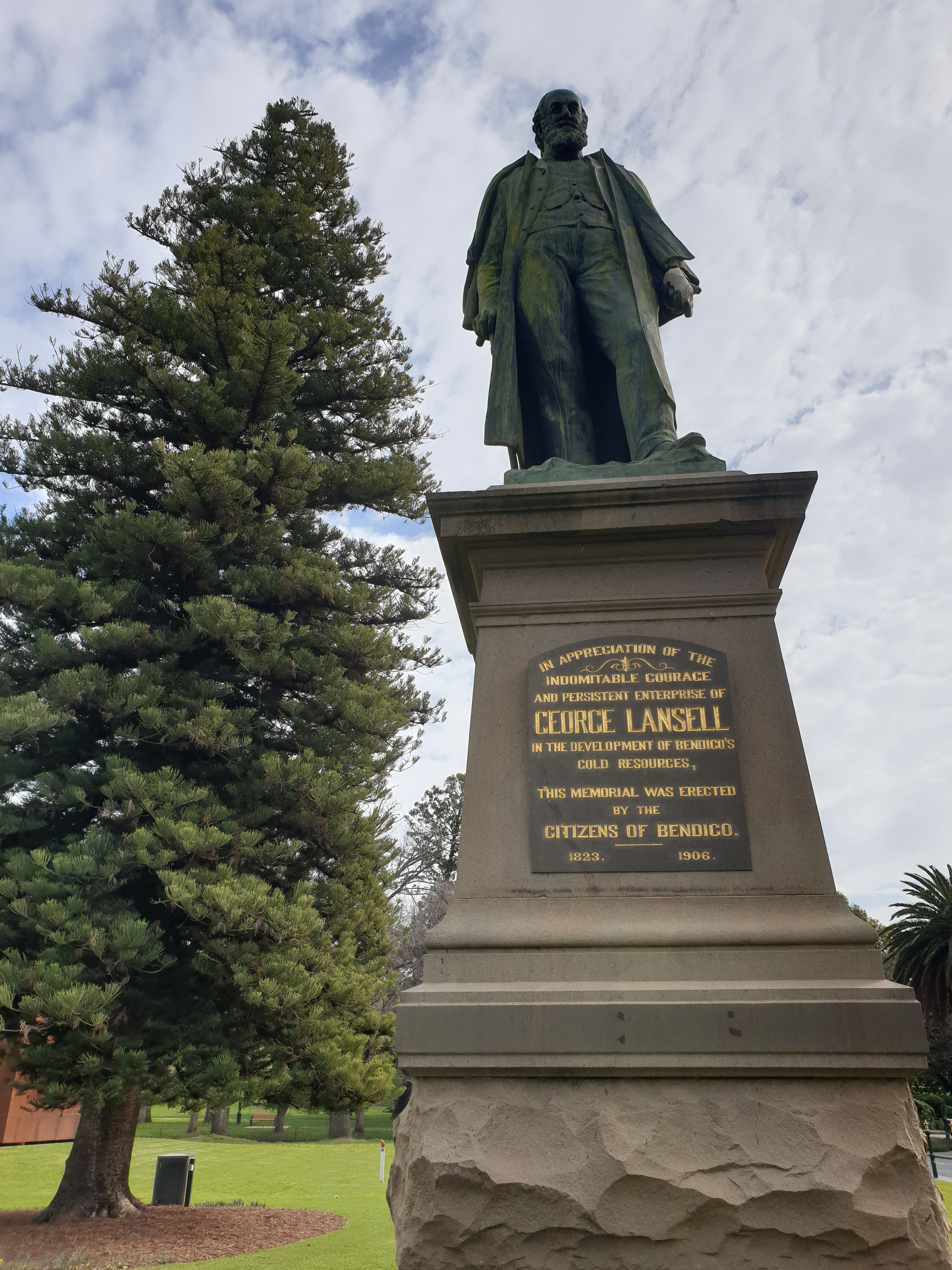
Statue of George Lansell in Bendigo

He died in Bendigo in 1959.

A statue by sculptor James White, is dedicated to George Lansell, and now stands in Rosalind Park, Bendigo, Australia.

Victorian Legislative Council
Preceded by Joseph Sternberg	Member for Bendigo; 1928–1952; Served alongside: Herbert Keck; John Lienhop; Thomas Grigg	Succeeded by Arthur Smith
