= Electoral district of Seymour =

Former state electoral district of Victoria, Australia

Seymour Victoria—Legislative Assembly
- State: Victoria
- Created: 1992
- Abolished: 2014
- Electors: 41,103 (2010)
- Area: 6,022 km^{2} (2,325.1 sq mi)
- Demographic: Rural

Seymour was an electoral district of the Victorian Legislative Assembly. It covered rural territory north of Melbourne, including the towns of Alexandra, Healesville, Kinglake, Marysville, Seymour and Yea.

It was created at the redistribution prior to the 1992 election where it was comfortably won by the Liberal's Marie Tehan who represented the comparable Legislative Council seat of Central Highlands Province from 1987 to 1992.

The seat recorded a 6.8% swing to the Labor Party at the 1996 election before being narrowly and surprisingly won by Labor's Ben Hardman due to the anti-Kennett rural backlash at 1999 election. Hardman extended his majority to 9.5% at the 2002 election and was re-elected at the 2006 election, but he was defeated by Liberal candidate Cindy McLeish at the 2010 election.

Seymour was abolished prior to the 2014 state election. Its former territory was divided between the new districts of Eildon and Euroa, as well as the pre-existing district of Yan Yean.

== Members for Seymour ==
| Member | Party | Term |
|---|---|---|
| Marie Tehan | Liberal | 1992–1999 |
| Ben Hardman | Labor | 1999–2010 |
| Cindy McLeish | Liberal | 2010–2014 |

== Election results ==
2010 Victorian state election: Seymour
| Party | Candidate | Votes | % | ±% |
|---|---|---|---|---|
| Liberal | Cindy McLeish | 12,992 | 35.63 | −2.80 |
| Labor | Ben Hardman | 12,813 | 35.14 | −11.28 |
| Independent | Jan Beer | 3,738 | 10.25 | +10.25 |
| Greens | Huw Slater | 3,230 | 8.86 | −0.47 |
| Country Alliance | Adam Taurian | 1,587 | 4.35 | +4.35 |
| National | Anthony Rolando | 1,391 | 3.81 | +3.81 |
| Family First | Robert Guerra | 711 | 1.95 | −1.38 |
| Total formal votes | | 36,462 | 94.91 | −1.21 |
| Informal votes | | 1,955 | 5.09 | +1.21 |
| Turnout | | 38,417 | 93.47 | −0.55 |
Two-party-preferred result
| Liberal | Cindy McLeish | 18,728 | 51.25 | +8.07 |
| Labor | Ben Hardman | 17,811 | 48.75 | −8.07 |
| Liberal gain from Labor | | Swing | +8.07 | |

== See also ==
- Parliaments of the Australian states and territories
- List of members of the Victorian Legislative Assembly
