= Joseph Henry Abbott =

Australian politician

The Honourable Joseph Henry Abbott JP
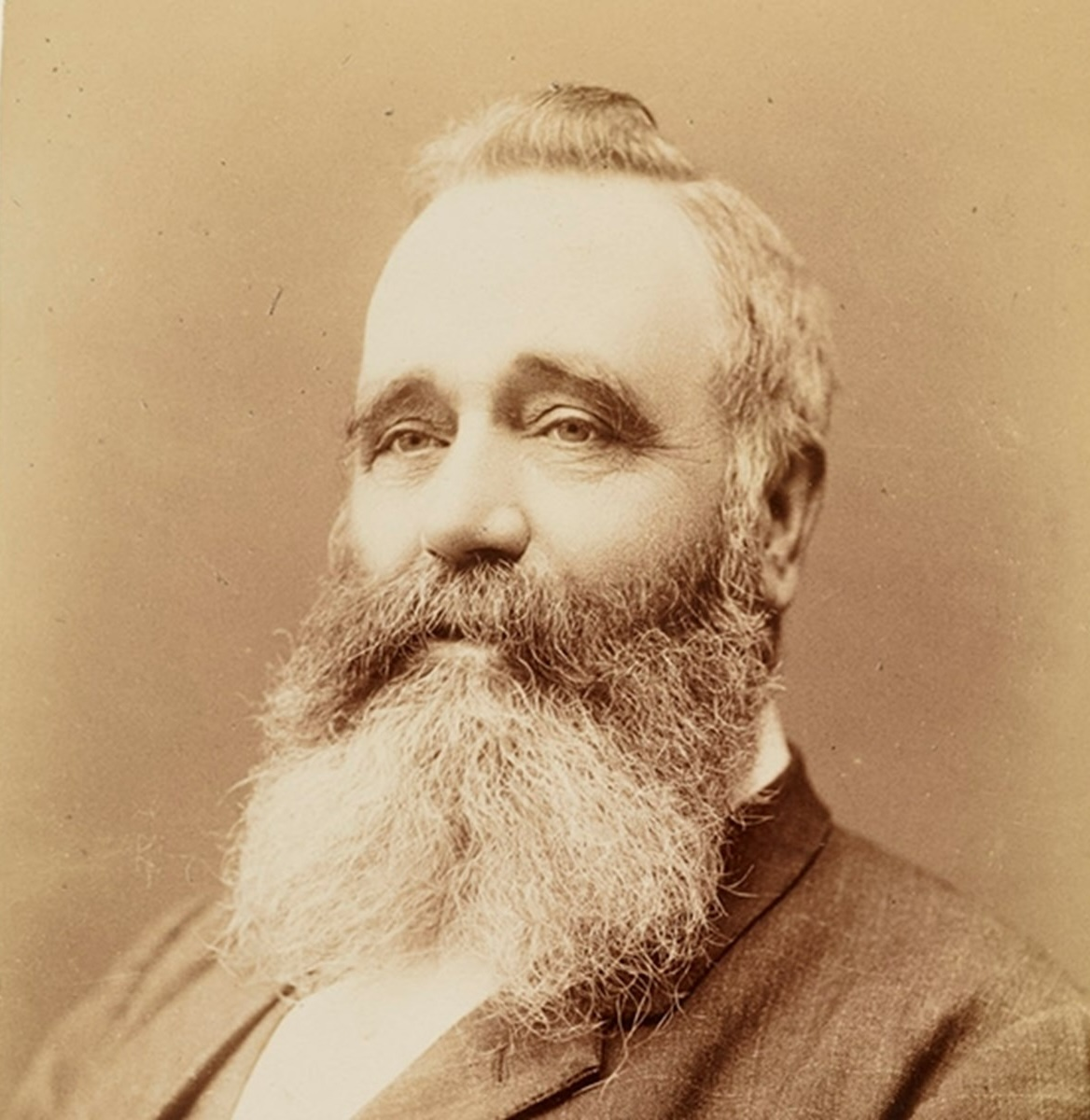

Member of the Victorian Legislative Council for Northern Province
- In office April 1889 – June 1904

Member of the Victorian Legislative Council for Bendigo Province
- In office August 1904 – 10 November 1904 Serving with Joseph Sternberg
- Preceded by: William Blair Gray
- Succeeded by: Alfred Hicks

Personal details
- Born: 1 February 1830 Birmingham, Warwickshire, England
- Died: 10 November 1904 (aged 74) Bendigo, Victoria
- Spouse(s): Ann, née Deague
- Children: Two daughters, a son and a stepson
- Parents: Joseph Abbott (father); Mary Ann Abbott (née Signet) (mother)

Joseph Henry Abbott JP (1 February 1830 – 10 November 1904) was an Australian Politician, serving as a member of the Victorian Legislative Council for the Northern Province and Bendigo Province electorates. He served in the executive Council of Victoria as a minister without office from 23 January 1893 to 27 September 1894 under the Patterson Government.

== Early life and career ==
Joseph Henry Abbott was born 1 February 1830 in Birmingham, England to Mary Ann Abbott (née Signet) and Joseph Abbott. He studied at King Edward Free Grammar School in Birmingham up until age 12 when he left to work for his father who was a millwright. At age 21 he sailed in the Earl of Derby to Melbourne upon news of the Victorian gold rush. He arrived at Cole's wharf on 17 November 1852.

Once in Victoria Abbott settled in the Forest Creek area and mined for gold successfully near Moonlight Flat and Wesley Hill. In early 1853, Abbott opened a general store two friends and combined their business with mining activities. The following year they built a puddling machine to process gold-bearing clay. Around this time, Abbott, alongside Ebenezer Syme and George Edward Thomson started the newspaper the Diggers Advocate which was a strong opponent against the cost of mining permits. Abbott was a reporter for the paper based in Bendigo. The paper ran for two years.

In 1858, Abbott converted a shop in Pall Mall (Bendigo) into a hotel and theatre and also was elected to the Sandhurst Borough Council becoming chairman of the council (and a justice of the peace) in 1860. In 1862 he opened a boot shop on Pall Mall, later expanding by adding a tannery at Strathfieldsaye.

== Politics ==
In the 1876 Victorian Legislative Council election contested a vacancy in the North Western Province against Alexander Fraser. Despite being elected, receiving 51% of votes, the Elections and Qualifications Committee of the Legislative Council found that Abbott was ineligible to sit as a member due to insufficient property qualifications as the property in question was in fact owned by his wife and Fraser was instead elected.

In 1883, Abbott represented Victoria in the Amsterdam Exhibition and the Royal Agricultural Show in 1894.

In 1888 Abbott was elected to the Bendigo council, later becoming mayor in 1891. He was elected in April 1889 to the Legislative council in the Northern Province electorate until 1904 when he lost his seat. He then almost immediately contested a by-election for the Bendigo Province, returning to parliament until his death in November that year. He served in the executive Council of Victoria as a minister without office from 23 January 1893 to 27 September 1894 under the Patterson Government.

== Personal life ==
Abbott was a member of the Congregational Church and a Freemason. In 1860, he married Ann, née Deague with whom he had two daughters, a son and a stepson, Richard Abbott.
