= John Lienhop =

Australian politician and grazier

Sir John Lienhop

Member of the Victorian Legislative Council for Bendigo Province
- In office June 1937 – February 1951
- Preceded by: Herbert Keck; George Lansell
- Succeeded by: Thomas Grigg; George Lansell

Personal details
- Born: John Herman Lienhop; 3 February 1886 Kangaroo Flat, Victoria
- Died: 27 April 1967 (aged 81) East Melbourne, Victoria, Australia
- Party: Country Party
- Other political affiliations: Liberal and Country Party
- Spouse(s): Rosetta Wirth (1910–1928; her death); Catherine Mary Dalton (1951–1967; his death)
- Occupation: Grazier

Sir John Herman (Henry) Lienhop (3 February 1886 – 27 April 1967) was an Australian politician and grazier. He was the member of the Victorian Legislative Council for Bendigo Province from June 1937 to February 1951.

Lienhop was born in Kangaroo Flat near Bendigo to Albert Lienhop, a German publican, and Irish-born Bridget Nash. His father died in 1896, and Lienhop took over management of the family's pub, the Kangaroo Flat Hotel. From 1912, he owned an 8000-acre grazing property called The Springs at Womboota near Deniliquin.

He first entered local politics as a City of Bendigo councillor from 1932 to 1937, then was elected to the Victorian Legislative Council as one of two Country Party members for Bendigo Province (alongside George Lansell). He was first appointed to cabinet in April 1942, as a Minister without Portfolio, replacing the deceased Henry Pye. In September 1943, he was appointed to the Second Dunstan Ministry as Commissioner of Public Works until the Dunstan government was defeated in 1945; and was Minister in Charge of Electrical Undertakings and Minister of Mines from 1947 to 1948. In 1949, Lienhop defected from the Country Party to the Liberal and Country Party formed by Thomas Hollway. Although he did not return to the Country Party, he did support John McDonald's Country government in several key votes in 1950.

Lienhop resigned from the Legislative Council in February 1951 to become Agent-General for Victoria in London. He was knighted in 1951. Upon his return after his five-year term in 1956, he wrote an article for The Argus newspaper, criticising what he saw as an imbalanced migration system which would jeopardise the state's primary industries, with a small percentage of migrants to Victoria moving to rural industry areas.

Victorian Legislative Council
Preceded by Herbert Keck; George Lansell	Member for Bendigo Province; 1937–1951; Served alongside: George Lansell	Succeeded by Thomas Grigg; George Lansell
Political offices
Preceded by John Joseph Holland	Commissioner of Public Works; 1943–1945	Succeeded by Likely McBrien
Preceded by Pat Kennelly	Minister in Charge of Electrical Undertakings; 1947–1948	Succeeded by James Kennedy
Preceded by William McKenzie	Minister of Mines; 1947–1984	Succeeded by James Kennedy
Diplomatic posts
Preceded by Sir Norman Martin	Agent-General for Victoria; 1951–1956	Succeeded by William Leggatt
