= Andrew MacLeod =

Australian/British philanthropist

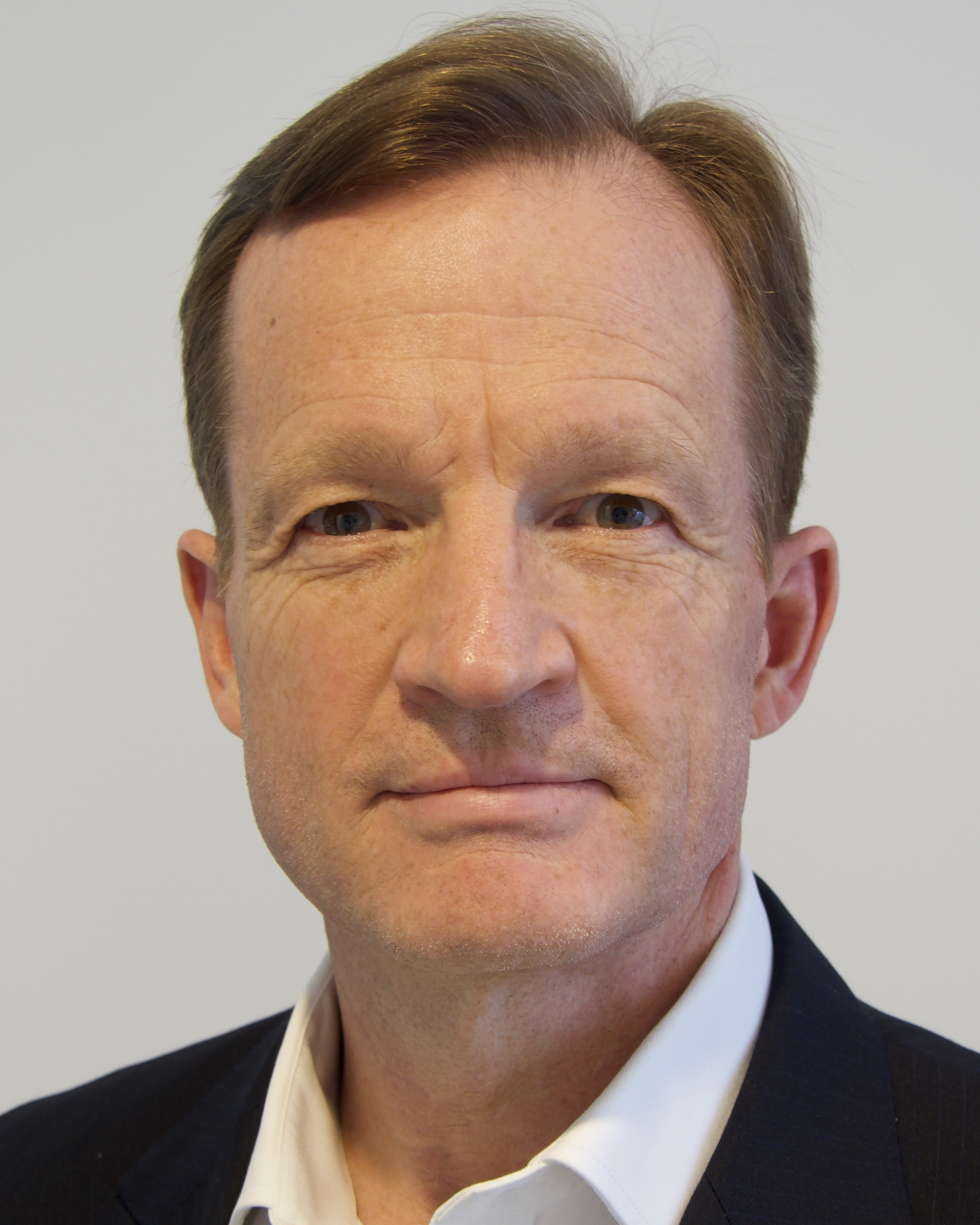

Personal details
- Born: Melbourne, Victoria, Australia
- Education: University of Tasmania; University of Southampton; University of Melbourne; King's College London

Professor Andrew Michael MacLeod AKC is an Australian/British philanthropist, businessman, author, humanitarian lawyer, and former aid worker.

MacLeod is a non-executive director of Saudi-based Arabian Leopard Fund and previously has served as chairman of private equity firm Macson Investments, CEO and chair of British-based Griffin Law, UAE-based Burnham Global, and had several senior visiting and governance roles at universities in Australia and the UK. He was formerly a humanitarian official with both the International Committee of the Red Cross and the United Nations. He is co-founder of Swiss/US charity Hear Their Cries. He maintains a Commission as an Australian Army reserve officer.

He served as Chief of Operations of the United Nations Emergency Coordination Centre in the international response to the 2005 Kashmir earthquake in Pakistan. Previously he was CEO of the Committee for Melbourne, non-executive director of New York-based Cornerstone Capital, an affiliate senior associate to the Center for Strategic International Studies in Washington DC; sat on the Sustainable Accounting Advisory Board; advised numerous charities, was General Manager Communities, Communications and External Relations at global miner Rio Tinto, a board member and formerly chairman of Principles for Social Investment.

== Early life and education ==
MacLeod was born in Melbourne, Australia. He was educated at St Michael's Grammar School in Melbourne, where he was Captain of the School, and obtained his combined Bachelor of Arts and Bachelor of Laws degree from the University of Tasmania in 1993, where he also swam for the Sandy Bay swimming club.

MacLeod also holds a Master of Laws (International Law) from the University of Southampton and a Graduate Diploma in International Law from the University of Melbourne. In 2021 MacLeod finished a course of theological studies and was awarded an Associateship of King's College, the AKC.

== Career ==
=== Humanitarian ===
MacLeod worked with the International Committee of the Red Cross (ICRC) in Yugoslavia during the Yugoslav wars and in Rwanda. It was for his first deployment to the Balkans that MacLeod was awarded the Humanitarian Overseas Service Medal, with a second award of the Humanitarian Overseas Service Medal for Rwanda (Great Lakes).

From 2003 to 2005 MacLeod was head of Early Warning and Emergency Preparedness for UNHCR. In 2005, MacLeod worked as Chief of Operations of the United Nations Emergency Coordination Center which provided information and coordination to the NGOs and United Nations agencies delivering aid and relief after the Pakistan earthquake. MacLeod then became the first "Relief to Recovery Transition" specialist, ensuring no drop-off in service delivery to the people in the transitional period. He remained in Pakistan until 2008. MacLeod left the United Nations in 2009 after a year-long deployment to The Philippines.

MacLeod became critical of the lack of effectiveness and efficiency of the United Nations as he saw it. He raised a number of criticisms of the humanitarian system in his book "A Life Half Lived", including the UN's failure to crack down on UN staff paedophilia and hebephilia. He has also been published in several newspapers on the subject.

=== Philanthropist ===
MacLeod is a co-founder and co-funder of HearTheirCries.org a Swiss association fighting sexual abuse in the Aid industry. HTC is also a 501(c)(3) Charity in the United States.

=== Genetic genealogy ===
Following the Golden State Killer case, MacLeod conceived of a modification to the genetic genealogy used to track the killer, to instead identify fathers of children abandoned by abusive aid workers and sex tourists.

Macleod's techniques have resulted in court orders against fathers requiring them to pay child support and allow children to assert nationality rights based on patriality.

=== Business ===
Between 2010 and 2012, MacLeod served as CEO of the Committee for Melbourne, an independent network of Melbourne leaders working for Melbourne's liveability and economic prosperity. He also served as General Manager Community, Communications and External Relations for global giant Rio Tinto. From 2013 to 2019 Macleod was a member of the management board of New York-based Cornerstone Capital. He was Chairman of Griffin Law, a Non-Executive Director at Burnham Global, a member of the Audit and Risk Committee at Risk Advisory Group, and a senior advisor to UK based Critical Resource. He is a graduate member of the Australian Institute of Company Directors.

=== Academic ===
MacLeod is Chief of Staff at King Abdullah University of Science and Technology (KAUST) in Saudi Arabia, and a visiting professor at King's College London. He was an Adjunct Senior Lecturer at the University of Tasmania Law School. He is a Vice Chancellor's Distinguished Fellow at Deakin University and formerly sat on the Council at Keele University.

=== China and One Belt One Road ===
Professor MacLeod is a public policy expert focusing on a number of issues including China's Belt and Road Initiative, the legality of Taiwan's status, as well as issues of international commerce, trade, finance and counter-terrorism.

== Published works ==
MacLeod is the author of A Life Half Lived published by New Holland Press in 2013, Stop the Bollocks, Things I Would Have Told My Mother, Maria: A Lonely Tear That Never Dries and Doing Good by Mistake: A Humorous Look at NGOs in Disaster.

== Sport ==
MacLeod won the silver medal for the 200m Butterfly at the World Masters Games in 2002.

== Travel ==
According to NomadMania MacLeod is verified as visiting every country in the world.

== Awards and honours ==
MacLeod is a recipient of the Australian Defence Medal for his service as an Army Reserve Officer.

He was awarded the Humanitarian Overseas Service Medal twice. He was awarded the Deakin University Distinguished Fellows award, the University of Tasmania Foundation Distinguished Alumni award and the Young Britons Foundation Global Award for Freedom.

In 2024 Macleod was awarded a ‘Legal Hero’ award for his work protecting children by the Law Society of England and Wales.
