= Division of McEwen =

Australian federal electoral division

Coordinates: 37.362°S 145.347°E

McEwen Australian House of Representatives Division
- Interactive map of electorate boundaries from the 2025 federal election
- Created: 1984
- MP: Rob Mitchell
- Party: Labor
- Namesake: Sir John McEwen
- Electors: 117,940 (2025)
- Area: 2,288 km^{2} (883.4 sq mi)
- Demographic: Rural

The Division of McEwen is an Australian Electoral Division in the state of Victoria. The electorate is located in the centre of the state, north of its capital city Melbourne. Classed as a rural seat, it includes the towns of Gisborne, Macedon, Whittlesea, and Wallan, though it also includes the newly developed Melbourne suburbs of Mernda, Doreen and Donnybrook.

== Geography ==
Since 1984, federal electoral division boundaries in Australia have been determined at redistributions by a redistribution committee appointed by the Australian Electoral Commission. Redistributions occur for the boundaries of divisions in a particular state, and they occur every seven years, or sooner if a state's representation entitlement changes or when divisions of a state are malapportioned.

When it was first created in 1984, the division covered the outer northern suburbs of Melbourne and a large area of regional Victoria north of Melbourne. For the suburbs, the division included Epping, Greensborough and Montmorency. It also included towns (later becoming suburbs in the future) of Plenty, Doreen, Mernda, Craigieburn, Donnybrook and Mickleham. These suburban areas were previously part of the Division of Scullin and the abolished Division of Diamond Valley. For regional Victoria, the division extended up to Nagambie and Violet Town to the north, and included the towns of Seymour, Yea, Mansfield, Wallan and Whittlesea. These regional areas were previously part of the Divisions of Scullin, Burke, Bendigo and Indi.

Over time since then, it has gained and lost various areas in northern Victoria and the northern suburbs, with some changes to boundaries. Between 1994 and 2010, it also included Healesville and Warburton. Between 2010 and 2021, the division also included Sunbury in north-west Melbourne.

In 2003, the division shifted west into Gisborne, Macedon and Woodend to replace the abolished Division of Burke, while losing Nagambie and Mansfield to the Division of Indi. In 2010, the division also lost its eastern half to Division of Indi, including the towns of Yea, Alexandra and Eildon. In 2018, the division was further shrunk in area by half, losing its northern half (Seymour) to the new Division of Nicholls. In 2024, it lost Kilmore and Christmas Hills to the Divisions of Nicholls and Casey respectively. It also swapped areas with the Division of Scullin, gaining the entirety of Mernda but losing Wollert entirely. It also gained Kalkallo from the Division of Calwell.

As of the 2024 redistribution, McEwen includes the outer northern suburbs of Doreen, Mernda, Donnybrook, Diamond Creek and Hurstbridge, and towns outside the metropolitan area such as Wallan, Gisborne, Macedon and Woodend. Out of these, Doreen, Mernda, Donnybrook, Whittlesea and Wandong have always been located within McEwen throughout the history of the division (as of 2025). A portion of its southern boundary runs along the southern boundary of Shire of Macedon Ranges.

== History ==
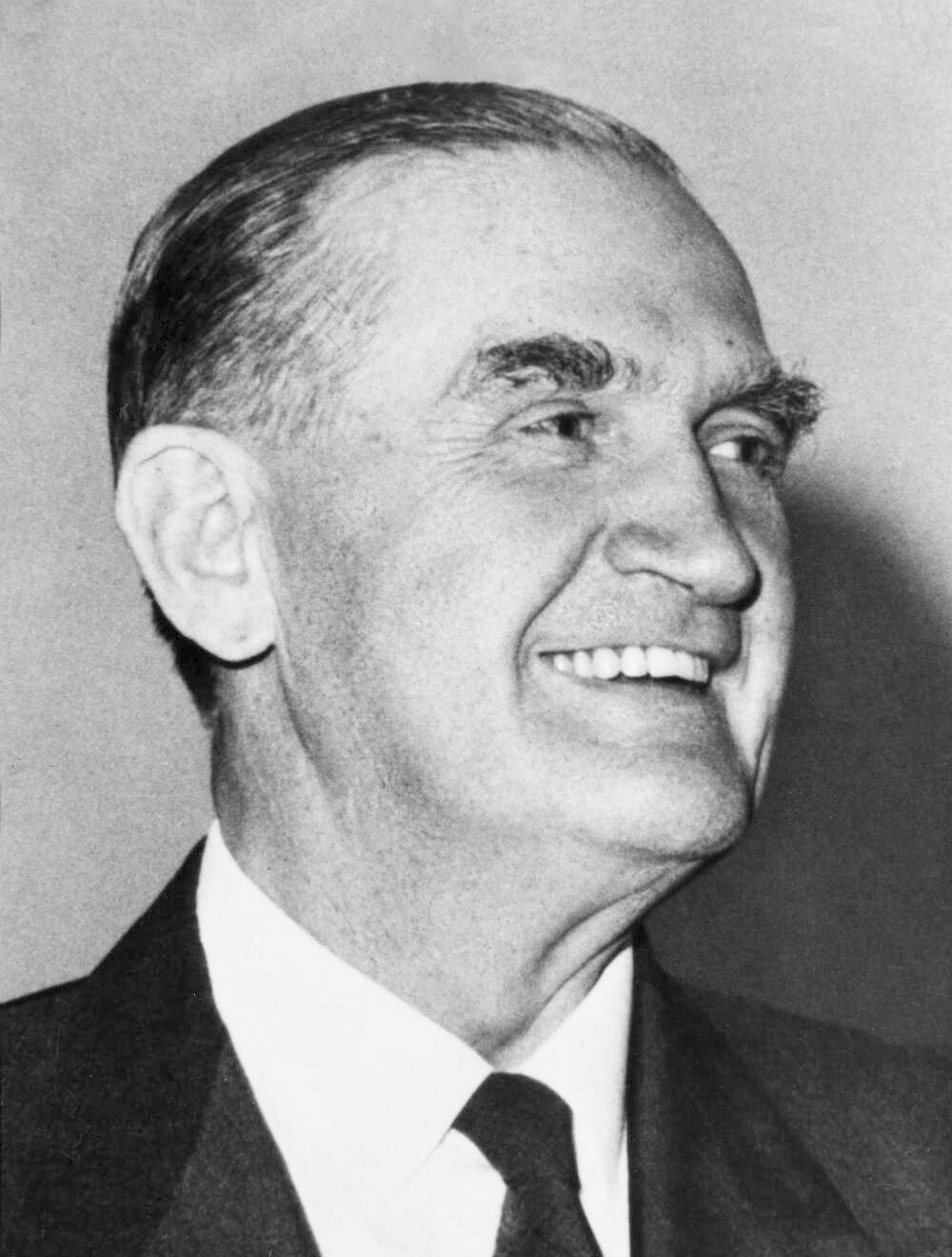
Sir John McEwen, the division's namesake

The Division was proclaimed at the redistribution of 14 September 1984, and was first contested at the 1984 federal election. It was named after Sir John McEwen, leader of the Australian Country Party from 1958 to 1971, who served as caretaker Prime Minister of Australia after the disappearance of Harold Holt in 1967.

While classed as rural, it is actually a hybrid urban-rural seat. The urban portion is located in Labor's traditional heartland of north Melbourne, while the rural portion votes equally strongly for the Liberals and Nationals. As a result, for most of its existence it has been highly marginal. Unlike most marginal seats with similar demographics, however, McEwen is not considered a barometer for winning government. All but one of its members has spent at least one term in opposition.

The 2007 election resulted in McEwen becoming the most marginal seat in the country. Incumbent Liberal MP Fran Bailey led throughout most of the initial count, and was initially found to have lost to former Labor state MLC Rob Mitchell by six votes. Bailey subsequently requested and was granted a full recount, which overturned Mitchell's win and instead gave Bailey a twelve-vote victory. The result was challenged in the High Court of Australia in its capacity as the Court of Disputed Returns, and was referred to the Federal Court of Australia. Over seven months after the election and a review of 643 individual votes, the court altered the formal status of several dozen for a variety of reasons including that voters putting their initials only does not count as being identifiable and thus should be counted as formal, three votes that were ruled informal due to concerns they were not official ballots and one that had unusual notations resembling Roman numerals in a ballot filed with typical Arabic numerals that was ruled informal but overturned. The court eventually declared Bailey the winner by 27 votes, later amended to 31 votes. Following the resolution of the long-running dispute, Bailey called for a total overhaul of the voting system.

Bailey retired at the 2010 election where Mitchell again stood as the Labor candidate and won amid a considerable swing to Labor in Victoria that allowed Julia Gillard to form a minority government. Ahead of the 2013 election, a redistribution pushed McEwen further into Melbourne, increasing Labor's notional majority from a marginal 5.3 percent to a fairly safe 9.2 percent. However, Mitchell barely retained the seat against former Liberal MLC Donna Petrovich with a majority of just 0.15 percent—a margin of just 313 votes—which made McEwen the second most marginal seat in Australia at the time; the Division of Fairfax, won by Clive Palmer, was decided by a thinner margin of just 53 votes. Mitchell won a third term in 2016 Australian federal election on a swing of over seven percent, boosting his majority to 57 percent, the strongest result in the seat's history.

== Members ==
Image	Member	Party	Term	Notes
	Peter Cleeland (1938–2007)	Labor	1 December 1984 – 24 March 1990	Lost seat
	Fran Bailey (1946–)	Liberal	24 March 1990 – 13 March 1993	Lost seat
	Peter Cleeland (1938–2007)	Labor	13 March 1993 – 2 March 1996	Lost seat
	Fran Bailey (1946–)	Liberal	2 March 1996 – 19 July 2010	Served as minister under Howard. Retired
	Rob Mitchell (1967–)	Labor	21 August 2010 – present	Incumbent

== Election results ==
2025 Australian federal election: McEwen
Party	Candidate	Votes	%	±%
Labor	Rob Mitchell	39,079	37.35	+0.13
Liberal	Jason McClintock	34,023	32.52	−0.24
Greens	Marley McRae McLeod	11,611	11.10	−2.95
One Nation	Jeremy Johnson	6,869	6.57	+0.99
Legalise Cannabis	Tom Forrest	4,057	3.88	+3.88
People First	Ali Antoniou	3,538	3.38	+3.38
Family First	Julio Valencia	2,499	2.39	+2.39
Animal Justice	Chloe Nicolosi	2,100	2.01	+2.01
Fusion	Erin McGrath	840	0.80	+0.80
Total formal votes		104,616	94.84	−1.18
Informal votes		5,691	5.16	+1.18
Turnout		110,307	93.54	+9.11
Two-party-preferred result
Labor	Rob Mitchell	57,288	54.76	+0.94
Liberal	Jason McClintock	47,328	45.24	−0.94
Labor hold		Swing	+0.94	
