= Peter Cleeland =

Australian politician

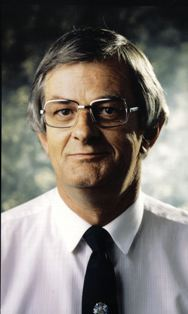

Member of the Australian Parliament for McEwen
- In office 1 December 1984 – 24 March 1990
- Preceded by: New seat
- Succeeded by: Fran Bailey
- In office 13 March 1993 – 2 March 1996
- Preceded by: Fran Bailey
- Succeeded by: Fran Bailey

Personal details
- Born: 31 May 1938 Preston, Victoria
- Died: 16 September 2007 (aged 69)
- Party: Australian Labor Party
- Occupation: Policeman

Peter Robert Cleeland (31 May 1938 – 16 September 2007), Australian politician, was a Labor member of the Australian House of Representatives, representing the electorate of McEwen in Victoria between 1984 and 1990, and subsequently between 1993 and 1996.

Cleeland was raised in the Melbourne suburb of Preston, earning a trade as a fitter and turner before joining the Victorian Police Force from 1961 to 1969. While a police officer, he studied and graduated in law at Monash University. He worked as a solicitor for a number of years, eventually establishing his own practice. He was elected as a local councillor for the Central Ward in the Shire of Diamond Valley from 1978 to 1985 and was Shire President from 1982 to 1983.

In 1982 Cleeland unsuccessfully stood for election in the Victorian Legislative Assembly seat of Doncaster. He achieved Labor Party preselection for the newly formed federal House of Representatives seat of McEwen, which he won in 1984. Cleeland won the subsequent election in 1987, before losing the seat to Liberal candidate Fran Bailey in the 1990 general election. He stood once again in 1993 and won the seat back, serving for a further 3 years before once again losing the seat to Bailey in the 1996 election, when the Keating Labor government was swept from power by John Howard.

Cleeland served as Chairman of the Parliamentary Joint Committee on the National Crime Authority between 1987 and 1990, producing during that time the much cited report "Drugs, Crime and Society". The report recommended harm minimisation rather than criminalisation as a technique for managing illicit drug use.

Cleeland died on 16 September 2007 from motor neurone disease.

Parliament of Australia
| New division | Member for McEwen; 1984–1990 | Succeeded by Fran Bailey |
| Preceded by Fran Bailey | Member for McEwen; 1993–1996 | Succeeded by Fran Bailey |
