= Fred Grimwade =

Australian politician

President of the Victorian Legislative Council
- In office 18 July 1979 – 15 July 1985
- Preceded by: William Fry
- Succeeded by: Rod Mackenzie

Victorian Legislative Council
- In office 29 April 1967 – 4 May 1979 Serving with Jock Granter, Bruce Reid
- Constituency: Bendigo Province
- In office 5 May 1979 – 12 February 1987 Serving with Jock Granter
- Constituency: Central Highlands Province

Personal details
- Born: Frederick Sheppard Grimwade; 12 September 1933 Melbourne, Victoria
- Died: 23 February 1989 (aged 55)
- Party: Liberal Party
- Spouse: Joan Elizabeth Rich OBE (m. 1956)
- Relatives: Frederick Sheppard Grimwade (great-grandfather); Philip Sheppard Grimwade AO (uncle)
- Education: Melbourne Grammar School
- Alma mater: University of Melbourne; Iowa State College
- Occupation: Farmer, grazier; Politician

Frederick Sheppard "Fred" Grimwade (12 September 1933 – 23 February 1989) was an Australian politician.

Grimwade was born in Melbourne, the son of Erick Grimwade (whose grandfather was a state politician) and Gwendolen Ada Carnegie. He attended Melbourne Grammar School and Melbourne University, where he was a resident student at Trinity College. He graduated with a Bachelor of Agricultural Science, and then undertook further study at Iowa State College in the United States. He subsequently farmed at Glenaroua Homestead in Broadford. On 3 May 1956 he married Joan Elizabeth Rich, State Commissioner of the Victorian Girl Guides Association from 1973 to 1978. Grimwade was involved in several beef farming societies as well as the agriculture faculty of Melbourne University, and was on the council of the Bendigo Institute of Technology and the state Liberal Party. He was a member of Pyalong Shire Council from 1961 to 1980, serving as president from 1962 to 1963 and 1972 to 1972. In 1967 he was elected to the Victorian Legislative Council representing Bendigo Province, transferring to Central Highlands in 1979. He served as President of the Victorian Legislative Council from 1979 to 1985. He retired from politics in 1987.

Grimwade initiated the idea of creating a portrait gallery for former Premiers of Victoria, with Grimwade arranging for paintings to be commissioned from photographs of former non-living Premiers and life studies of living former Premiers. Originally displayed in the corridor leading to the Members Dining Room, the portrait gallery is now located in Queens Hall in Parliament House.
