= Davendra Pathik =

Davendra Pathik was an Indo-Fijian lawyer and judge who graduated as a lawyer from the University of Tasmania in 1957 and was admitted to the Supreme Court of Tasmania in 1957 and in Fiji in 1958. He practised in Fiji until 1972 when he was appointed as a Magistrate and then a judge. Aside from his distinguished legal career, Justice Pathik has also made significant contributions to the Fijian community, including establishing the first Apex Club in Fiji in 1961.
