= Rob Mitchell (Victorian politician) =

Australian politician (born 1967)

Rob Mitchell MP
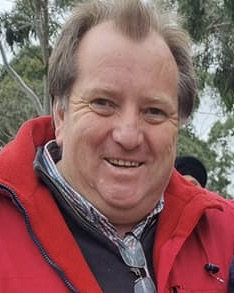

4th Second Deputy Speaker of the Australian House of Representatives
- In office 12 November 2013 – 11 April 2022
- Speaker: Bronwyn Bishop; Tony Smith; Andrew Wallace
- Preceded by: Steve Georganas
- Succeeded by: Ian Goodenough

Member of the Victorian Legislative Council for Central Highlands
- In office 30 November 2002 – 24 November 2006
- Preceded by: Geoff Craige
- Succeeded by: District abolished

Member of the Australian Parliament for McEwen
- Incumbent
- Assumed office 21 August 2010
- Preceded by: Fran Bailey

Personal details
- Born: Robert George Mitchell; 9 September 1967 (age 58) Melbourne, Victoria, Australia
- Party: Labor
- Domestic partner: Lisa Cartledge
- Children: 1
- Website: Official website

Robert George Mitchell (born 9 September 1967) is an Australian politician. He has been an Australian Labor Party member of the Australian House of Representatives since August 2010, representing the electorate of McEwen. He was a member of the Victorian Legislative Council from 2002 to 2006, and was Second Deputy Speaker of the Australian House of Representatives from 2013 to 2022.

== Early life ==
Mitchell was born in Melbourne on 9 September 1967. He grew up in the suburb of Dallas in the city's north. His younger brother Jason died of Marfan syndrome at the age of 29.

Mitchell left school in year 10 to take up a shoemaking apprenticeship. He later worked as a contractor for the Royal Automobile Club of Victoria, as a tow-truck operator, and as a sales and marketing representative within the transport industry. He was the state manager of a diesel parts company from 2000 to 2002 and is a member of the Institute of Automotive Mechanical Engineers.

== State politics ==
Mitchell was recruited into the ALP by Don Nardella. He first stood for parliament at the 1999 Victorian state election, unsuccessfully standing for the Victorian Legislative Council in Central Highlands Province. He won the seat on his next attempt at the 2002 state election. The province was abolished in 2006 following the reform of the Legislative Council. Mitchell then stood unsuccessfully as the Labor candidate for the Victorian Legislative Assembly seat of Benalla at the 2006 state election.

== Federal politics ==
At the 2007 federal election, Mitchell was the Labor candidate for the seat of McEwen, a hybrid urban-rural seat encompassing Labor-friendly territory in north Melbourne and more conservative rural areas to the north of the capital. He had initially been announced as the winning candidate, defeating the sitting Liberal member Fran Bailey by a mere seven votes. However, after a recount this margin was reduced to five. A subsequent recount requested by the Liberal Party, overturned this result with Mitchell instead losing by 12 votes. The Court of Disputed Returns later increased this margin to 27 votes.

He won McEwen following Bailey's retirement at the 2010 election. His win was one of only two gains for Labor at the election. Ahead of the 2013 federal election, McEwen was pushed further into Melbourne, technically making it a safe Labor seat. However, Mitchell weathered a nine-point swing against former Liberal MLC Donna Petrovich. He retained the seat at the 2016 election with a swing of seven points.

Mitchell served as a government whip from May 2013 until the government's defeat at the 2013 election. He was subsequently elected second deputy speaker of the House, having been first appointed to the speaker's panel in February 2012. In November 2021, Mitchell was nominated by his party as a candidate for the Speaker of the Australian House of Representatives but was defeated by Liberal's Andrew Wallace 59 votes to 70. Following ALP's victory at the 2022 election, he was defeated by Queensland MP Milton Dick in an internal Right faction ballot to become the party's nominee for speaker. The speakership was assigned to the Right faction under a deal in which the Left faction would choose the party's nominee for President of the Senate.

== Personal life ==
Mitchell has one daughter with his partner Lisa Cartledge. As of 2021 he lived in Whittlesea, Victoria. His home was not lost in the Black Saturday bushfires in 2009.

Parliament of Australia
Preceded by Fran Bailey	Member for McEwen; 2010–present	Incumbent
