= Alfred Hicks =

Australian politician

Minister without portfolio
- In office 18 May 1920 – 6 September 1921

Member of the Victorian Legislative Council for Bendigo Province
- In office 1 December 1904 – 1 September 1921
- Preceded by: Joseph Henry Abbott
- Succeeded by: Herbert Keck

Mayor of the Borough of Eaglehawk
- In office 1904–1905
- Preceded by: Robert Murdoch
- Succeeded by: John T Trevean

Personal details
- Born: 23 February 1880 Saint Columb Major, Cornwall, United Kingdom
- Died: 6 September 1921 (aged 41) Eaglehawk, Victoria, Australia
- Party: Nationalist
- Spouse: Ada Hooper
- Occupation: Methodist minister, grocer

Alfred Hicks (23 February 1860 – 6 September 1921) was an English-born Australian politician.

He was born in Saint Columb Major in Cornwall to agricultural labourer Richard Hicks and Phillippa Champion. He migrated to Victoria around 1881, and became a Methodist minister, preaching at Clunes, Creswick and Eaglehawk. Around 1889 he married Ada Hooper, with whom he had two children. He later left the ministry and became a grocer at Eaglehawk. From 1900 to 1906 he served on Eaglehawk Borough Council, and he was mayor from 1904 to 1905. In 1904 he was elected to the Victorian Legislative Council for Bendigo Province. He served as a minister without portfolio from 1920 until his death in Eaglehawk in 1921.

Victorian Legislative Council
Preceded by Joseph Abbott	Member for Bendigo; 1904–1921; Served alongside: Joseph Sternberg	Succeeded by Herbert Keck
