= Ben Hardman =

Australian politician

Benedict (Ben) Paul Hardman (born 4 August 1964) is an Australian former politician. He was a Labor Party member of the Victorian Legislative Assembly from 1999 to 2010, representing the electorate of Seymour.

Hardman was born in Kiama, New South Wales. He was educated at St Peter and Paul Primary School and St Gregory's College, Campbelltown. He worked as a steward with the Wagga Wagga Leagues Club from 1982 to 1983, and as a clerk for the Wagga Wagga City Council from 1983 to 1986, before moving to Victoria to study teaching at the University of Ballarat. He graduated in 1989, and worked as a teacher at Highlands Primary School before being appointed principal of Flowerdale Primary School in 1996, a role he held until his election to parliament.

Hardman was preselected as the Labor candidate for the state seat of Seymour for the 1999 state election. Seymour was a Liberal-leaning seat that had been easily held by retiring Liberal minister Marie Tehan, and Hardman was not expected to win; however, amidst the Bracks government's surprise victory he emerged successful, eking out a narrow win on election day. He increased his majority sharply amidst Labor's landslide re-election in 2002, and was again easily re-elected in 2006. He was defeated in 2010.

Victorian Legislative Assembly
Preceded by Marie Tehan	Member for Seymour; 1999–2010	Succeeded by Cindy McLeish
