= Fran Bailey =

Australian politician (born 1946)

The Honourable Fran Bailey
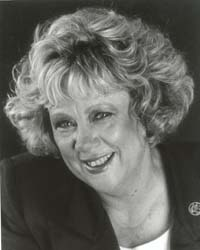

Minister for Small Business and Tourism
- In office 26 October 2004 – 3 December 2007
- Prime Minister: John Howard
- Preceded by: Joe Hockey
- Succeeded by: Craig Emerson (Small Business); Martin Ferguson (tourism)

Minister for Employment Services
- In office 18 July 2004 – 26 October 2004
- Prime Minister: John Howard
- Preceded by: Mal Brough
- Succeeded by: Peter Dutton

Member of the Australian Parliament for McEwen
- In office 2 March 1996 – 19 July 2010
- Preceded by: Peter Cleeland
- Succeeded by: Rob Mitchell
- In office 24 March 1990 – 13 March 1993
- Preceded by: Peter Cleeland
- Succeeded by: Peter Cleeland

Personal details
- Born: 21 May 1946 (age 80) Brisbane, Queensland, Australia
- Party: Liberal
- Education: University of Queensland

Frances Esther Bailey (born 21 May 1946) is an Australian former politician. She is a member of the Liberal Party and served in the House of Representatives from 1990 to 1993 and 1996 to 2010, representing the Division of McEwen in Victoria. She held ministerial office in the Howard government as Minister for Employment Services (2004) and Small Business and Tourism (2004–2007).

== Early life ==
Bailey was born in Brisbane and attended All Hallows' School there, where she was regarded as a champion swimmer. She graduated from the University of Queensland and Kelvin Grove Teachers' College, later studying sociology at La Trobe University.

Bailey worked as a secondary school teacher, retailer and cashmere goat breeder before entering politics.

== Politics ==
Bailey was secretary of the Yarra Glen branch of the Liberal Party from 1984 to 1988 and President of the branch from 1988 to 1989. She also worked as the campaign director for the Victorian state seat of Evelyn at the 1988 election.

Bailey was first elected at the 1990 election, defeating Labor incumbent Peter Cleeland in McEwen. She became the first female Liberal candidate elected to a Victorian seat, and the first woman elected to represent a rural electorate.

She was promoted to Shadow Minister for Consumer Affairs, and was heavily involved with the Liberals' Fightback! campaign to regain power. Cleeland defeated her in the 1993 election, a rematch of 1990. However, she won the seat back in 1996, defeating Cleeland in another rematch. She served on the Joint Standing Committee on Foreign Affairs, Defence and Trade from 1998 to 2002.

Before her return to McEwen, she sought preselection for the 1994 Kooyong by-election but the preselection and then the by-election was won by her future parliamentary colleague Petro Georgiou.

=== Ministerial career ===
In 2001, Bailey was promoted to Parliamentary Secretary to the Minister for Defence. In July 2004 she was promoted to Minister for Employment Services and Assistant Minister for Defence. She became Minister for Small Business and Tourism in October 2004.

=== Tourism Minister and clash with Scott Morrison ===
During her stint as tourism minister, Bailey clashed with the future prime minister, Scott Morrison, who was the managing director of Tourism Australia (TA).

It was described that Morrison was trying to "steal the limelight" from Bailey and did press releases without approval of Bailey who was his boss and bypassed her office on key decisions. Morrison and the TA board pushed for the "So where the bloody hell are you?" ad campaign to be awarded to M&C Saatchi, reportedly bypassing Bailey and government procurement guidelines for three contracts with a total value of $184 million.

In 2006, she flew to London with Lara Bingle to successfully lobby the British Broadcast Advertising Clearance Centre (BACC) for the right to use the word "bloody" in advertisements promoting Australia for the "So where the bloody hell are you?" campaign, as the word "bloody" breached the BACC's guidelines. However, privately Bailey believed that Morrison and his team had failed to do the proper research into Britain's advertising code before rolling out the ad campaign in Britain. Morrison also repeatedly kept critical information from the Tourism Australia board. As the minister and the TA board lost confidence in Morrison, Bailey advised to Prime Minister John Howard that Morrison be sacked. Howard accepted the advice and Morrison was fired in August 2006.

More than a year later in 2007 Morrison was elected to Federal Parliament as the Liberal member for Cook and this meant that he and Bailey were in the same party room for what would become her final term in Parliament.

In 2022, following Morrison's multi-ministerial positions controversy, Bailey revealed that Morrison showed no respect for his colleagues at Tourism Australia and he left her feeling bullied, also confirming that he "point-blank refused" to provide her or the board with any documentation or to answer questions about how the ad campaign was awarded to Saatchi. She said she was "gobsmacked when he became prime minister" and called for Morrison to resign from Parliament. She described that Morrison had "the supreme belief that only he can do a job, the lack of consultation with those closest to him – those characteristics were evident 16 years ago, and perhaps we’re seeing the end result of those now".

=== 2007 election controversy and final term ===
Her period as minister ended with the defeat of the Howard government at the 2007 election. Her hold on McEwen was always somewhat tenuous due to its demographics. Although classed as rural by the Australian Electoral Commission, it is actually a hybrid urban-rural seat. It includes several outer northern suburbs of Melbourne that tilt heavily to Labor, while the more rural portion votes equally heavily for the Liberals and Nationals. However, the 2007 election resulted in McEwen becoming the most marginal seat in the country. Initially, it appeared that Bailey had lost to former Labor state MP Rob Mitchell by six votes. Bailey requested and was granted a full recount, which gave her the win by 12 votes.

The result was challenged in the High Court of Australia in its capacity as the Court of Disputed Returns, and was referred to the Federal Court of Australia. Over seven months after the election and a review of 643 individual votes, the court altered the formal status of several dozen, eventually declaring Bailey the winner by 27 votes. Following the resolution of the long-running dispute, Bailey called for a total overhaul of the voting system.

Bailey announced in October 2009 that she would stand down at the 2010 election; she had served for 17 years in federal parliament by the time she retired.

Political offices
Preceded by Mal Brough	Minister for Employment Services; 2004	Succeeded by Peter Dutton as Minister for Workforce Participation
Preceded by Joe Hockey	Minister for Small Business and Tourism; 2004–2007	Succeeded by Craig Emerson as Minister for Small Business, Independent Contractors and the Service Economy
Preceded by Joe Hockey	Minister for Small Business and Tourism; 2004–2007	Succeeded by Martin Ferguson as Minister for Tourism
Parliament of Australia
Preceded by Peter Cleeland	Member for McEwen; 1990–1993	Succeeded by Peter Cleeland
Preceded by Peter Cleeland	Member for McEwen; 1996–2010	Succeeded by Rob Mitchell
