= Joseph Sternberg =

Joseph Sternberg (1852 – 13 January 1928) was an English-born Australian politician.

Sternberg was born in Whitechapel, London, the son of German Jews Alexander Sternberg (1822–1882) from Rawicz, Prussia; and Frederica (Recka or Rivka) Platt. He arrived in Melbourne, Victoria on 18 February 1861 and grew up in Rochester. He became a farmer and an auctioneer, the latter in partnership with his brother as Sternberg Bros. In 1880, he married Selina Lazarus, with whom he had two children.

In 1891, Sternberg was elected to the Victorian Legislative Council for Northern Province. He transferred to the new Bendigo Province in 1904 replacing William Blair Gray who died in office. Sternberg remained in the council as a Liberal and then a Nationalist until his death in Fitzroy, Victoria on 13 January 1928.

Victorian Legislative Council
Preceded by Frederick Illingworth	Member for Northern; 1891–1904; Served alongside: William Winter-Irving; Joseph Abbott; George Simmie	Succeeded by Martin Cussen
New seat	Member for Bendigo; 1904–1928; Served alongside: William Gray; Joseph Abbott; Alfred Hicks; Herbert Keck	Succeeded by George Lansell
