= Herbert Keck =

Australian politician

Herbert Keck (28 January 1859 – 8 June 1937) was an Australian politician.

Keck was born in Sandhurst to grocer William Keck and Eliza Collcutt. He worked as a mason before purchasing land at Kennington, becoming a nurseryman and orchardist. He also owned land at Barham, Cohuna and Elmore. On 16 May 1882 he married Ann Pattinson, with whom he had eight children; he had two later marriages, one, on 29 June 1906, to Ada Pattinson, and one, on 2 December 1933, to Margaret June Ireland. He served on Strathfieldsaye Shire Council from 1898 to 1937 and was president five times (1903–04, 1912–13, 1918–19, 1927–28, 1936–37). In October 1921 he won a by-election for Bendigo Province in the Victorian Legislative Council, representing the Nationalist Party. He served in the council until his death in Bendigo in June 1937.

Victorian Legislative Council
Preceded by Alfred Hicks	Member for Bendigo; 1921–1937; Served alongside: Joseph Sternberg; George Lansell	Succeeded by John Lienhop
