= Graeme Stoney =

Australian politician

Eadley Graeme Stoney AM (born 1 April 1940) is an Australian former politician.

== Life ==
Born in Mirboo North, Victoria, he was educated at Scotch College before becoming a farmer, alpine tourism operator and newspaper proprietor. Graeme was a "crack" rider in both "The Man From Snowy River" films and appeared in riding sequences in several other High Country films and documentaries. He was a member of many Mansfield community groups including Mansfield SES search and rescue mounted group, Boorolite CFA, VFF, Apex, Bindaree Retirement Village and Mansfield Autistic Centre. Among several business interests he was marketing manager for Mansfield Seeds which traded small seeds throughout Australia and grew seed in Mansfield for growers in Oregon USA. Graeme was heavily involved in the fight to retain Alpine grazing and during the 1980s organized several large protests and rallies. One such event which turned political was the Nunawading by election in 1985. The bitter fall out from that event culminated in him being summoned to the Bar of the Legislative Council to explain the Cattlemen's involvement in the Byelection. In a tumultuous day the numbers to actually invite him to appear the bar were lost and he was left standing in Queens Hall. In 1992 Graeme was elected to the Victorian Legislative Council as the Liberal member for Central Highlands Province. He remained in Parliament until 2006.

Stoney was appointed a Member of the Order of Australia in the 2023 Australia Day Honours.

== Major parliamentary achievements ==
- Chairman of the Kennett Government Rail Trails Committee which cut through the Victorian Railways red tape and oversaw the development of 17 trails in Victoria on disused railway corridors.
- Spokesperson for Forestry and Liberal Party Upper House Whip. Member of various bipartisan parliamentary committees including Road Safety and Environment and Natural Resources.

== Present ==
- Beef cattle producer including holding state forest grazing licence on Narboorac, Howqua Hills Victoria
- Member Telstra Victorian Rural Advisory Committee
- Author edition three "The Howqua Hills Story" in conjunction with Chris Stoney( Edition one and two), published March 2020
- Involved in management of Wendy Jubb -Stoney's Flinders Island Gourmet Retreat on Flinders island Bass Strait

== Current community service ==
- Past president and member, Mansfield Historical Society Museum Building committee
- Vice President, Mansfield Cultural Heritage and Arts Centre
- Life Member, Mansfield Autistic Centre
- Life Member, and past President Mountain Cattlemen's Association of Victoria
- Life Member, Victorian Tourism Industry Association
- Life Member, Mansfield Historical Society
