= Bendigo Province =

Former electoral province of the Victorian Legislative Council, Australia

Coordinates: 36°45′S 144°16′E

Bendigo Province Victoria—Legislative Council
- State: Victoria
- Created: 1904
- Abolished: 1988

Bendigo Province was an electorate of the Victorian Legislative Council . It was created in the redistribution of provinces in June 1904, North Central Province being abolished. Bendigo Province itself was abolished in 1988.

== Members ==
These were members of the upper house province of the Victorian Parliament. The bicameral system of government commenced in November 1856.

Members for Bendigo Province
| Year | Member | Party | Member | Party |
|---|---|---|---|---|
| 1904 | William Gray | | Joseph Sternberg | |
| 1904 | Joseph Abbott | | Joseph Sternberg | |
| 1904 | Alfred Hicks | | Joseph Sternberg | |
| 1907 | Alfred Hicks | | Joseph Sternberg | |
| 1910 | Alfred Hicks | | Joseph Sternberg | |
| 1913 | Alfred Hicks | | Joseph Sternberg | |
| 1916 | Alfred Hicks | | Joseph Sternberg | |
| 1917 | Alfred Hicks | Nationalist | Joseph Sternberg | Nationalist |
| 1919 | Alfred Hicks | Nationalist | Joseph Sternberg | Nationalist |
| 1921 | Herbert Keck | Nationalist | Joseph Sternberg | Nationalist |
| 1922 | Herbert Keck | Nationalist | Joseph Sternberg | Nationalist |
| 1925 | Herbert Keck | Nationalist | Joseph Sternberg | Nationalist |
| 1928 | Herbert Keck | Nationalist | George Lansell | Nationalist |
| 1931 | Herbert Keck | Nationalist | George Lansell | Nationalist |
| 1931 | Herbert Keck | United Australia | George Lansell | United Australia |
| 1934 | Herbert Keck | United Australia | George Lansell | United Australia |
| 1937 | John Lienhop | Country | George Lansell | United Australia |
| 1940 | John Lienhop | Country | George Lansell | United Australia |
| 1943 | John Lienhop | Country | George Lansell | United Australia |
| 1944 | John Lienhop | Country | George Lansell | Country |
| 1946 | John Lienhop | Country | George Lansell | Country |
| 1949 | John Lienhop | Liberal and Country | George Lansell | Liberal and Country |
| 1949 | John Lienhop | Liberal and Country | George Lansell | Liberal and Country |
| 1951 | Herbert Ludbrook | Liberal and Country | George Lansell | Liberal and Country |
| 1952 | Herbert Ludbrook | Liberal and Country | Arthur Smith | Labor |
| 1955 | Herbert Ludbrook | Liberal and Country | Arthur Smith | Labor |
| 1958 | Herbert Ludbrook | Liberal and Country | Arthur Smith | Labor |
| 1961 | Herbert Ludbrook | Liberal and Country | Arthur Smith | Labor |
| 1964 | Herbert Ludbrook | Liberal and Country | Jock Granter | Liberal and Country |
| 1965 | Herbert Ludbrook | Liberal | Jock Granter | Liberal |
| 1967 | Fred Grimwade | Liberal | Jock Granter | Liberal |
| 1970 | Fred Grimwade | Liberal | Jock Granter | Liberal |
| 1973 | Fred Grimwade | Liberal | Jock Granter | Liberal |
| 1976 | Fred Grimwade | Liberal | Bruce Reid | Liberal |
| 1979 | John Radford | Liberal | Bruce Reid | Liberal |
| 1982 | John Radford | Liberal | Bruce Reid | Liberal |
| 1985 | | | Bruce Reid | Liberal |

== Election results ==
1982 Victorian state election: Bendigo Province
| Party | Candidate | Votes | % | ±% |
|---|---|---|---|---|
| Labor | Fabian Reid | 34,312 | 40.0 | +3.9 |
| Liberal | Bruce Reid | 30,871 | 35.9 | +2.8 |
| National | Clarence Rodda | 14,922 | 17.4 | −5.0 |
| Democrats | Marlene Gunn | 5,788 | 6.7 | −1.7 |
| Total formal votes | | 85,893 | 97.9 | +0.4 |
| Informal votes | | 1,816 | 2.1 | −0.4 |
| Turnout | | 87,709 | 95.2 | +0.4 |
Two-party-preferred result
| Liberal | Bruce Reid | 46,487 | 54.1 | −1.1 |
| Labor | Fabian Reid | 39,406 | 45.9 | +1.1 |
| Liberal hold | | Swing | −1.1 | |
