= Central Highlands Province =

Former electoral province of the Victorian Legislative Council, Australia

Central Highlands Province was an electorate of the Legislative Council of Victoria, Australia. It existed as a two-member electorate from 1976 to 2006, with members holding alternating eight-year terms. It was a safe seat for the Liberal Party for most of its history, but was a surprise gain for the Labor Party in their landslide victory at the 2002 state election. The electorate was abolished in the Bracks Labor government's reform of the Legislative Council.

It covered a broad area of the state between the outer fringes of Melbourne and the Victorian Alps. In 2002, when it was last contested, it covered an area of 24,164 km^{2} and included the towns and suburbs of Alexandra, Benalla, Bright, Broadford, Coldstream, Diamond Creek, Euroa, Healesville, Hurstbridge, Lilydale, Mansfield, Marysville, Mount Beauty, Plenty, Seymour, Yan Yean, Yarra Glen and Yea.

== Members for Central Highlands Province ==
Member 1	Party	Year		
Jock Granter	Liberal	1976	Member 2	Party
Jock Granter	Liberal	1979	Fred Grimwade	Liberal
Jock Granter	Liberal	1982	Fred Grimwade	Liberal
Jock Granter	Liberal	1985	Fred Grimwade	Liberal
Jock Granter	Liberal	1987	Marie Tehan	Liberal
Geoff Craige	Liberal	1988	Marie Tehan	Liberal
Geoff Craige	Liberal	1992	Graeme Stoney	Liberal
Geoff Craige	Liberal	1996	Graeme Stoney	Liberal
Geoff Craige	Liberal	1999	Graeme Stoney	Liberal
Rob Mitchell	Labor	2002	Graeme Stoney	Liberal

== Election results ==
2002 Victorian state election: Central Highlands Province
Party	Candidate	Votes	%	±%
Labor	Rob Mitchell	57,245	44.3	+1.1
Liberal	Cath Marriott	48,352	37.4	−16.6
Greens	Janet MacKenzie	12,206	9.4	+8.4
National	Rozi Parisotto	9,563	7.4	+6.5
Democrats	Jos Vandersman	1,925	1.5	+0.8
Total formal votes		129,291	96.7	−0.2
Informal votes		4,470	3.3	+0.2
Turnout		133,761	94.1	
Two-party-preferred result
Labor	Rob Mitchell	70,460	54.5	+9.8
Liberal	Cath Marriott	58,831	45.5	−9.8
Labor gain from Liberal		Swing	+9.8	
