= William Blair Gray =

Victorian parliamentarian and mining engineer (1833–1904)

Member of the Victorian Legislative Council for North Central Province
- In office 1 June 1901 – 1 May 1904
- Preceded by: (seat established)
- Succeeded by: (province abolished)

Member of the Victorian Legislative Council for Bendigo Province
- In office 1 June 1904 – 26 July 1904
- Preceded by: (province created)
- Succeeded by: Joseph Sternberg (elected 1904)

Personal details
- Born: 29 March 1833 Campsie, Stirlingshire, Scotland
- Died: 26 July 1904 (aged 71) East Melbourne, Victoria, Australia
- Occupation: Mining engineer, politician

William Blair Gray (29 March 1833 – 26 July 1904) was a Scottish-born Australian politician. He served as a member of the Victorian Legislative Council from 1901 until 1904, representing the North Central Province (and later the Bendigo Province after a redistribution). Prior to his state legislative service, Gray was a long-time local official in Victoria, having served on the Maldon Shire Council from 1888 until his death. He was known for his work as a mining engineer and for his influence in the development of the Maldon district.

== Early life ==
Gray was born at Campsie, near Glasgow in Scotland, on 29 March 1833. He emigrated to the Colony of Victoria in 1859 as a young man. After spending a few years on the goldfields at Forest Creek (now Castlemaine), he settled in the town of Maldon, Victoria. Gray trained and worked as a mining engineer, becoming a prominent figure in Maldon's mining industry. He was instrumental in a late-19th-century resurgence of mining activity in the district.

== Local government career ==
In 1888, Gray entered local politics when he was elected to the Maldon Shire Council, the municipal governing body for the Maldon district. He served on the Shire Council continuously from 1888 until his death in 1904. During this period, Gray held the position of Shire President (the head of the council) on multiple occasions, including at least one term in 1902. In recognition of his community standing, he was appointed a justice of the peace (J.P.) for the locality (a ceremonial magistrate role). Gray's long tenure in local government made him a well-known civic leader in Maldon and the surrounding region.

== Legislative Council career ==
Gray expanded his political career to the colonial (and later state) level at the turn of the century. In June 1901, he successfully stood for election to the Victorian Legislative Council, the upper house of the Victorian Parliament, representing North Central Province. He ran as a candidate aligned with the liberal-conservative interests of the time and won the seat, which gave him a voice in state legislation. As a Legislative Council member (M.L.C.), Gray served on several parliamentary committees, including the Refreshment Rooms Committee and a committee on electric traction for railways.

In 1904, a reorganization of Legislative Council provinces took effect, North Central Province was abolished and replaced by new provinces as part of a reform of the council's structure. Gray contested the newly created Bendigo Province in the June 1904 elections and retained a seat in the council. He continued to serve as an M.L.C. for Bendigo Province, albeit for a brief period.

== Death and legacy ==
William Blair Gray died in office on 26 July 1904 at a private hospital in East Melbourne, Victoria. He was 71 years old at the time of his death. His passing came shortly after his re-election to the Legislative Council, and it was attributed to complications following an operation for peritonitis. Gray's body was brought by train to Maldon, the town he had served for so many years, and he was interred there. His funeral in Maldon was a large and respectful gathering of the community.

Gray's contributions to public life in Maldon and Victoria were noted in contemporary accounts. Tributes in local institutions, such as the Maldon Hospital and Benevolent Asylum, praised his long service and dedication to the district. Beyond his political roles, Gray's legacy in Maldon includes the substantial residence he built on High Street in the 1890s, a portion of which was later incorporated into the Maldon Shire council offices in the mid-20th century. Gray is remembered as a significant figure in Maldon's civic and mining history, exemplifying the local leadership of Victoria's goldfields era.
