= Bruce Reid (politician) =

Australian politician (1935–2020)

Member of the Australian Parliament for Bendigo
- In office 24 March 1990 – 31 August 1998
- Preceded by: John Brumby
- Succeeded by: Steve Gibbons

Personal details
- Born: 30 July 1935 Bendigo, Victoria
- Died: 24 May 2020 (aged 84) Bendigo, Victoria, Australia
- Party: Liberal Party
- Occupation: Retailer

Nicholas Bruce Reid (30 July 1935 – 24 May 2020) was an Australian politician.

Born in Bendigo, Victoria, he served in the military in 1958 and then became a retailer. In 1976, he was elected to the Victorian Legislative Council as the Liberal member for Bendigo Province. He remained in the Legislative Council until 1988. In 1990, he was elected to the Australian House of Representatives as the Liberal member for the federal seat of Bendigo, defeating John Brumby.

After the Liberals lost the 1993 federal election, he contested the Liberal leadership with John Howard and John Hewson, but received only one vote.

He held the seat of Bendigo until his retirement in 1998.

Parliament of Australia
Preceded by John Brumby	Member for Bendigo; 1990–1998	Succeeded by Steve Gibbons
