= Marie Tehan =

Australian politician and lawyer (1940–2004)

The Honourable Marie Tehan

Minister for Conservation and Land Management
- In office 23 March 1996 – 21 October 1999
- Premier: Jeff Kennett
- Preceded by: Mark Birrell
- Succeeded by: Sherryl Garbutt

Minister for Health
- In office 6 October 1992 – 23 March 1996
- Premier: Jeff Kennett
- Preceded by: Maureen Lyster
- Succeeded by: Rob Knowles

Member of the Victorian Legislative Assembly for Seymour
- In office 3 October 1992 – 17 September 1999
- Preceded by: New division
- Succeeded by: Ben Hardman

Member of the Victorian Legislative Council
- In office 21 March 1987 – 2 October 1992

Personal details
- Born: Marie Therese O'Brien; 19 June 1940 Melbourne, Victoria
- Died: 31 October 2004 (aged 64) Nagambie, Victoria
- Party: Liberal Party of Australia
- Spouse: James Tehan (m. 1963)
- Children: 6, including Dan Tehan
- Education: University of Melbourne (LLB)
- Occupation: Lawyer and politician

Marie Therese Tehan (née O'Brien; 19 June 1940 – 31 October 2004) was an Australian politician and lawyer who served in the Parliament of Victoria.

== Early life and education ==
Marie Therese O'Brien was born on 19 June 1940 in Melbourne, Victoria.

She was educated at Sacré Cœur School, Glen Iris, Melbourne, and qualified as a lawyer at the University of Melbourne in 1961.

== Career ==
After having six children, Tehan established her own legal practice in Mansfield in 1970.

Tehan was elected to the Victorian Parliament in 1987 and retired in 1999. Representing the Liberal Party, Tehan served in both houses of the Victorian Parliament. She was the member for Central Highlands Province in the Legislative Council from 1987 to 1992 and for Seymour in the Legislative Assembly from 1992 to 1999. As a minister in the Kennett Liberal government, she held the portfolios of Minister for Health from 1992 to 1996 and Minister for Conservation and Land Management from 1996 to 1999.

As Minister for Health, she presided over some of the worst years of the HIV/AIDS epidemic in Australia, and liaised with the Victorian Aids Council under Jim Hyde during this time.

== Other activities and roles ==
Tehan also undertook a number of other activities and roles throughout her life, including:

- Tutor in law, Newman College, 1962–66
- Assistant examiner, Law Faculty, Melbourne University
- Secondary school teacher, Sacred Heart College, 1969
- Senior member of Veterans' Review Board, 1986–87
- Member, Australian Board and International Board of Foster Parents Plan from 1982
- Member, Goulburn/North East Regional TAFE Board, 1983
- Executive Committee, TAFE Regional Board, 1983

== Personal life and death ==
O'Brien married James "Jim" Tehan in 1963 and settled in regional Victoria. They had six children—including Dan Tehan, the federal member for Wannon since 2010. She established her own legal practice in Mansfield in 1970.

Tehan died on 31 October 2004, at Nagambie, Victoria, aged 64, due to Creutzfeldt-Jakob disease (CJD).

Victorian Legislative Assembly
New seat	Member for Seymour; 1992–1999	Succeeded by Ben Hardman
