= Thomas Grigg (politician) =

Australian politician (1889–1969)

Thomas Henry Grigg (14 June 1889 – 14 April 1969) was an Australian politician.

Born in Maldon to miner Thomas Henry Grigg and Elizabeth Jones, he attended state school before becoming a miner in 1902. On 8 May 1914 he married Ida Alberta May in Sydney, with whom he had three children. He remained in Sydney as a public servant until 1918 before returning to Maldon in 1919 to farm poultry. He was active in the local community, serving on the committees of the Fire Brigade, the Hospital and the State School; he was also President of the Northern District Municipal Association (1943–61) and the Municipal Association of Victoria (1950–54). He was elected to Maldon Shire Council in 1939 and served until 1967 (president 1944–45, 1950–51, 1959–60); originally a member of the Country Party, he resigned to join the Liberal Party in February 1949. In 1951 Grigg was elected to the Victorian Legislative Council for Bendigo Province, serving until 1967. He died in Maldon in 1969.
