= Electoral results for the Division of Mallee =

Australian division election results

This is a list of electoral results for the Division of Mallee in Australian federal elections from the division's creation in 1949 until the present.

== Members ==
Member	Party	Term
(Sir) Winton Turnbull	Country	1949–1972
Peter Fisher	Country/National Country/Nationals	1972–1993
John Forrest	National	1993–2013
Andrew Broad	National	2013–2019
Anne Webster	National	2019–present

== Election results ==
=== Elections in the 2020s ===
==== 2025 ====
2025 Australian federal election: Mallee
Party	Candidate	Votes	%	±%
Greens	Nicole Rowan			
National	Anne Webster			
Citizens	Chris Lahy			
Trumpet of Patriots	Adam Troy Veitch			
Labor	Greg Olsen			
One Nation	Vaughan Williams			
Libertarian	Jeff Barry			
Family First	Ashleigh Gray			
Total formal votes				
Informal votes				
Turnout				

==== 2022 ====
2022 Australian federal election: Mallee
Party	Candidate	Votes	%	±%
National	Anne Webster	50,187	49.09	+22.65
Labor	Carole Hart	17,133	16.76	+0.22
Independent	Sophie Baldwin	10,256	10.03	+10.03
United Australia	Stuart King	9,271	9.07	+5.56
One Nation	Vanessa Atkinson	6,901	6.75	+6.75
Greens	Sam McColl	5,463	5.34	+1.68
Independent	Claudia Haenel	2,196	2.15	+2.15
Citizens	Chris Lahy	822	0.80	+0.38
Total formal votes		102,229	94.36	+5.22
Informal votes		6,113	5.64	−5.22
Turnout		108,342	90.19	−4.09
Two-party-preferred result
National	Anne Webster	70,523	68.99	+3.31
Labor	Carole Hart	31,706	31.01	−3.31
National hold		Swing	+3.31	

Alluvial diagram for preference flows in the seat of Mallee in the 2022 federal election. indicates at what stage the winning candidate had over 50% of the votes and was declared the winner.

=== Elections in the 2010s ===
==== 2019 ====
2019 Australian federal election: Mallee
Party	Candidate	Votes	%	±%
National	Anne Webster	26,142	27.86	−28.06
Liberal	Serge Petrovich	17,665	18.83	+11.74
Labor	Carole Hart	14,722	15.69	−6.85
Independent	Jason Modica	8,795	9.37	+9.37
Independent	Ray Kingston	8,621	9.19	+9.19
Shooters, Fishers, Farmers	Dan Straub	5,512	5.87	+5.87
Greens	Nicole Rowan	3,297	3.51	−3.50
United Australia	Rick Millar	3,171	3.38	+3.38
Independent	Cecilia Moar	2,761	2.94	+2.94
Conservative National	Rick Grosvenor	1,309	1.40	+1.40
Rise Up Australia	Philip Mollison	919	0.98	−3.50
Science	Leigh Firman	497	0.53	+0.53
Citizens Electoral Council	Chris Lahy	416	0.44	−1.23
Total formal votes		93,827	88.84	−6.41
Informal votes		11,792	11.16	+6.41
Turnout		105,619	92.84	−1.48
Two-party-preferred result
National	Anne Webster	62,143	66.23	−3.57
Labor	Carole Hart	31,684	33.77	+3.57
National hold		Swing	−3.57	

==== 2016 ====
2016 Australian federal election: Mallee
Party	Candidate	Votes	%	±%
National	Andrew Broad	56,251	64.31	+25.55
Labor	Lydia Senior	18,742	21.43	+3.93
Greens	Helen Healy	6,222	7.11	+4.04
Rise Up Australia	Tim Middleton	4,536	5.19	+4.29
Citizens Electoral Council	Chris Lahy	1,715	1.96	+1.68
Total formal votes		87,466	95.35	+2.26
Informal votes		4,269	4.65	−2.26
Turnout		91,735	92.36	−2.31
Two-party-preferred result
National	Andrew Broad	62,383	71.32	−2.34
Labor	Lydia Senior	25,083	28.68	+2.34
National hold		Swing	−2.34	

==== 2013 ====
2013 Australian federal election: Mallee
Party	Candidate	Votes	%	±%
National	Andrew Broad	33,270	38.76	−23.82
Liberal	Chris Crewther	23,363	27.22	+24.12
Labor	Lydia Senior	15,020	17.50	−3.33
Katter's Australian	Vince Cirillo	3,195	3.72	+3.72
Palmer United	Mark Cory	2,883	3.36	+3.36
Greens	Jane Macallister	2,637	3.07	−4.67
Sex Party	Amy Mulcahy	2,118	2.47	+2.47
Family First	Neil Buller	1,356	1.58	−3.67
Rise Up Australia	Tim Middleton	772	0.90	+0.90
Independent	Allen Ridgeway	595	0.69	+0.69
Country Alliance	Michael Coldham	384	0.45	+0.45
Citizens Electoral Council	Chris Lahy	241	0.28	+0.28
Total formal votes		85,834	93.09	−2.53
Informal votes		6,373	6.91	+2.53
Turnout		92,207	94.70	+0.25
Notional two-party-preferred count
National	Andrew Broad	63,224	73.66	+0.40
Labor	Lydia Senior	22,610	26.34	−0.40
Two-candidate-preferred result
National	Andrew Broad	48,243	56.21	−15.20
Liberal	Chris Crewther	37,591	43.79	+43.79
National hold		Swing	N/A	

==== 2010 ====
2010 Australian federal election: Mallee
Party	Candidate	Votes	%	±%
National	John Forrest	54,399	66.79	+2.85
Labor	Bob Scates	16,198	19.89	−1.96
Greens	Helen Healy	6,400	7.86	+3.69
Family First	Carl Carter	4,456	5.47	−1.06
Total formal votes		81,453	95.77	−0.64
Informal votes		3,594	4.23	+0.64
Turnout		85,047	94.66	−1.23
Two-party-preferred result
National	John Forrest	60,611	74.41	+3.14
Labor	Bob Scates	20,842	25.59	−3.14
National hold		Swing	+3.14	

=== Elections in the 2000s ===
==== 2007 ====
2007 Australian federal election: Mallee
Party	Candidate	Votes	%	±%
National	John Forrest	53,227	63.94	−4.48
Labor	John Zigouras	18,187	21.85	+1.54
Family First	Glenn Coulthard	5,435	6.53	+2.01
Greens	Liam Farrelly	3,468	4.17	+0.39
Democrats	Vikki McLeod	2,323	2.79	+1.24
Citizens Electoral Council	Chris Lahy	600	0.72	−0.71
Total formal votes		83,240	96.41	−0.10
Informal votes		3,101	3.59	+0.10
Turnout		86,341	95.82	+0.00
Two-party-preferred result
National	John Forrest	59,328	71.27	−3.48
Labor	John Zigouras	23,912	28.73	+3.48
National hold		Swing	−3.48	

==== 2004 ====
2004 Australian federal election: Mallee
Party	Candidate	Votes	%	±%
National	John Forrest	57,370	68.42	+15.22
Labor	John Zigouras	17,034	20.31	+0.35
Family First	Kevin Smith	3,787	4.52	+4.52
Greens	Simon Roberts	3,166	3.78	+1.47
Democrats	Stephen Parr	1,301	1.55	−2.84
Citizens Electoral Council	Trudy Campbell	1,197	1.43	+1.43
Total formal votes		83,855	96.51	+0.08
Informal votes		3,031	3.49	−0.08
Turnout		86,886	95.82	−0.51
Two-party-preferred result
National	John Forrest	62,680	74.75	+3.89
Labor	John Zigouras	21,175	25.25	−3.89
National hold		Swing	+3.89	

==== 2001 ====
2001 Australian federal election: Mallee
Party	Candidate	Votes	%	±%
National	John Forrest	44,769	59.06	+1.88
Labor	John Zigouras	15,440	20.37	−1.47
One Nation	Bob Mackley	6,550	8.64	−3.97
Independent	Ross Douglass	3,704	4.89	+4.89
Democrats	Timothy Kelly	3,532	4.66	+0.10
Greens	Julie Rivendell	1,809	2.39	+2.39
Total formal votes		75,804	96.38	−0.71
Informal votes		2,850	3.62	+0.71
Turnout		78,654	96.62	
Two-party-preferred result
National	John Forrest	53,007	69.93	+0.56
Labor	John Zigouras	22,797	30.07	−0.56
National hold		Swing	+0.56	

=== Elections in the 1990s ===
==== 1998 ====
1998 Australian federal election: Mallee
Party	Candidate	Votes	%	±%
National	John Forrest	43,132	57.18	−12.27
Labor	John Zigouras	16,471	21.83	−1.68
One Nation	Bill Croft	9,516	12.61	+12.61
Democrats	Tom Joyce	3,440	4.56	−1.30
Independent	Lionel McKenzie	2,278	3.02	+3.02
Citizens Electoral Council	Lee Cubit	600	0.80	+0.80
Total formal votes		75,437	97.09	−0.31
Informal votes		2,260	2.91	+0.31
Turnout		77,697	96.13	−0.59
Two-party-preferred result
National	John Forrest	52,328	69.37	−4.13
Labor	John Zigouras	23,109	30.63	+4.13
National hold		Swing	−4.13	

==== 1996 ====
1996 Australian federal election: Mallee
Party	Candidate	Votes	%	±%
National	John Forrest	52,671	69.45	+33.66
Labor	Col Palmer	17,832	23.51	−3.15
Democrats	Colin Davies	4,447	5.86	+3.39
Natural Law	Andrew Lawson Kerr	890	1.17	+0.36
Total formal votes		75,840	97.40	−0.18
Informal votes		2,025	2.60	+0.18
Turnout		77,865	96.72	−0.29
Two-party-preferred result
National	John Forrest	55,639	73.50	+23.00
Labor	Col Palmer	20,060	26.50	+26.50
National hold		Swing	+23.00	

==== 1993 ====
1993 Australian federal election: Mallee
Party	Candidate	Votes	%	±%
National	John Forrest	27,708	37.66	−31.66
Liberal	Adrian Kidd	23,894	32.48	+32.48
Labor	John Zigouras	19,510	26.52	+4.23
Democrats	Christopher Stear	1,840	2.50	−5.89
Natural Law	Andrew Lawson Kerr	617	0.84	+0.84
Total formal votes		73,569	97.56	−0.11
Informal votes		1,841	2.44	+0.11
Turnout		75,410	97.01	
Two-party-preferred result
National	John Forrest	37,104	50.50	−23.30
Liberal	Adrian Kidd	36,368	49.50	+49.50
National hold		Swing	+0.1	

==== 1990 ====
1990 Australian federal election: Mallee
Party	Candidate	Votes	%	±%
National	Peter Fisher	49,618	69.3	+21.3
Labor	Peter Mitchell	15,952	22.3	−6.1
Democrats	Ian McCracken	6,006	8.4	+8.4
Total formal votes		71,576	97.7	
Informal votes		1,706	2.3	
Turnout		73,282	96.2	
Two-party-preferred result
National	Peter Fisher	52,835	73.8	+3.7
Labor	Peter Mitchell	18,728	26.2	−3.7
National hold		Swing	+3.7	

=== Elections in the 1980s ===
==== 1987 ====
1987 Australian federal election: Mallee
Party	Candidate	Votes	%	±%
National	Peter Fisher	31,192	48.0	−5.5
Labor	Linda Freedman	18,461	28.4	+3.3
Liberal	Adrian Kidd	12,151	18.7	+3.4
Independent	Neil Lehmann	3,208	4.9	+4.9
Total formal votes		65,012	96.6	
Informal votes		2,275	3.4	
Turnout		67,287	95.8	
Two-party-preferred result
National	Peter Fisher	45,595	70.1	−1.3
Labor	Linda Freedman	19,414	29.9	+1.3
National hold		Swing	−1.3	

==== 1984 ====
1984 Australian federal election: Mallee
Party	Candidate	Votes	%	±%
National	Peter Fisher	33,173	53.5	−8.2
Labor	Lindsay Leake	15,584	25.1	−0.4
Liberal	M. Treseder	9,506	15.3	+5.8
Democratic Labor	Robert Hogarth	1,776	2.9	+2.9
Democrats	Colin Cavanagh	1,318	2.1	−1.1
Independent	Albertus Stoutjesdijk	613	1.0	+1.0
Total formal votes		61,970	93.9	
Informal votes		4,034	6.1	
Turnout		66,004	95.7	
Two-party-preferred result
National	Peter Fisher	44,237	71.4	−0.2
Labor	Lindsay Leake	17,687	28.6	+0.2
National hold		Swing	−0.2	

==== 1983 ====
1983 Australian federal election: Mallee
Party	Candidate	Votes	%	±%
National	Peter Fisher	40,063	62.1	+14.9
Labor	Graeme Jarry	16,193	25.1	+1.2
Liberal	Ross Owen	6,139	9.5	−11.9
Democrats	Colin Kavanagh	2,130	3.3	−1.1
Total formal votes		64,525	98.1	
Informal votes		1,269	1.9	
Turnout		65,794	95.8	
Two-party-preferred result
National	Peter Fisher		72.0	+1.2
Labor	Graeme Jarry		28.0	−1.2
National hold		Swing	+1.2	

==== 1980 ====
1980 Australian federal election: Mallee
Party	Candidate	Votes	%	±%
National Country	Peter Fisher	29,502	47.2	−1.1
Labor	Geoffrey Ferns	14,967	23.9	+2.1
Liberal	Neville Goodwin	13,393	21.4	−2.4
Democrats	Colin Kavanagh	2,736	4.4	+4.4
Independent	Leslie Connolly	1,592	2.5	+2.5
Independent	Ronald Nicholson	362	0.6	+0.6
Total formal votes		62,552	96.5	
Informal votes		2,254	3.5	
Turnout		64,806	95.6	
Two-party-preferred result
National Country	Peter Fisher	44,303	70.8	−2.5
Labor	Geoffrey Ferns	18,249	29.2	+2.5
National Country hold		Swing	−2.5	

=== Elections in the 1970s ===
==== 1977 ====
1977 Australian federal election: Mallee
Party	Candidate	Votes	%	±%
National Country	Peter Fisher	29,613	48.3	−20.2
Liberal	Warwick Hincksman	14,581	23.8	+23.8
Labor	Geoffrey Ferns	13,362	21.8	−3.2
Democratic Labor	John Cotter	3,707	6.1	−0.4
Total formal votes		61,263	97.5	
Informal votes		1,546	2.5	
Turnout		62,809	96.6	
Two-party-preferred result
National Country	Peter Fisher		73.3	−0.2
Labor	Geoffrey Ferns		26.7	+0.2
National Country hold		Swing	−0.2	

==== 1975 ====
1975 Australian federal election: Mallee
Party	Candidate	Votes	%	±%
National Country	Peter Fisher	33,663	70.1	+7.0
Labor	Ronald Davies	11,256	23.4	−3.7
Democratic Labor	Stanley Croughan	3,116	6.5	−1.1
Total formal votes		48,035	98.2	
Informal votes		866	1.8	
Turnout		48,901	96.1	
Two-party-preferred result
National Country	Peter Fisher		75.2	+4.2
Labor	Ronald Davies		24.8	−4.2
National Country hold		Swing	+4.2	

==== 1974 ====
1974 Australian federal election: Mallee
Party	Candidate	Votes	%	±%
Country	Peter Fisher	29,642	63.1	+7.8
Labor	Brian Smith	12,740	27.1	−6.3
Democratic Labor	Stanley Croughan	3,560	7.6	−3.7
Australia	John Grigg	1,035	2.2	+2.2
Total formal votes		46,977	98.0	
Informal votes		976	2.0	
Turnout		47,953	96.9	
Two-party-preferred result
Country	Peter Fisher		70.9	+6.3
Labor	Brian Smith		29.1	−6.3
Country hold		Swing	+6.3	

==== 1972 ====
1972 Australian federal election: Mallee
Party	Candidate	Votes	%	±%
Country	Peter Fisher	24,140	55.3	+8.6
Labor	Ronald Davies	14,593	33.4	+1.9
Democratic Labor	Stanley Croughan	4,930	11.3	+2.4
Total formal votes		43,663	98.6	
Informal votes		614	1.4	
Turnout		44,277	97.1	
Two-party-preferred result
Country	Peter Fisher		64.6	−1.5
Labor	Ronald Davies		35.4	+1.5
Country hold		Swing	−1.5	

=== Elections in the 1960s ===
==== 1969 ====
1969 Australian federal election: Mallee
Party	Candidate	Votes	%	±%
Country	Winton Turnbull	19,914	46.7	−21.5
Labor	Ronald Davies	13,420	31.5	+15.2
Liberal	James McFarlane	5,543	13.0	+13.0
Democratic Labor	Peter Lawrence	3,791	8.9	−6.6
Total formal votes		42,668	97.3	
Informal votes		1,198	2.7	
Turnout		43,866	96.5	
Two-party-preferred result
Country	Winton Turnbull		66.1	−15.2
Labor	Ronald Davies		33.9	+15.2
Country hold		Swing	−15.2	

==== 1966 ====
1966 Australian federal election: Mallee
Party	Candidate	Votes	%	±%
Country	Winton Turnbull	26,041	66.9	+3.8
Labor	Hibbe Draaisma	6,857	17.6	−9.1
Democratic Labor	John Carty	6,034	15.5	+5.3
Total formal votes		38,932	97.5	
Informal votes		1,011	2.5	
Turnout		39,943	96.7	
Two-party-preferred result
Country	Winton Turnbull		80.0	+8.7
Labor	Hibbe Draaisma		20.0	−8.7
Country hold		Swing	+8.7	

==== 1963 ====
1963 Australian federal election: Mallee
Party	Candidate	Votes	%	±%
Country	Winton Turnbull	24,805	63.1	+0.6
Labor	Maurice Hinton	10,489	26.7	+0.4
Democratic Labor	Michael Howley	4,004	10.2	−1.0
Total formal votes		39,298	99.0	
Informal votes		396	1.0	
Turnout		39,694	96.9	
Two-party-preferred result
Country	Winton Turnbull		71.3	−1.3
Labor	Maurice Hinton		28.7	+1.3
Country hold		Swing	−1.3	

==== 1961 ====
1961 Australian federal election: Mallee
Party	Candidate	Votes	%	±%
Country	Winton Turnbull	24,086	62.5	−1.4
Labor	Murray Homes	10,144	26.3	+4.5
Democratic Labor	Michael Howley	4,338	11.2	−3.1
Total formal votes		38,568	98.0	
Informal votes		803	2.0	
Turnout		39,371	96.2	
Two-party-preferred result
Country	Winton Turnbull		72.6	−4.3
Labor	Murray Homes		27.4	+4.3
Country hold		Swing	−4.3	

=== Elections in the 1950s ===
==== 1958 ====
1958 Australian federal election: Mallee
Party	Candidate	Votes	%	±%
Country	Winton Turnbull	24,356	63.9	−1.7
Labor	George Xeros	8,313	21.8	+0.4
Democratic Labor	John Cotter	5,470	14.3	+1.3
Total formal votes		38,139	97.9	
Informal votes		818	2.1	
Turnout		38,957	96.5	
Two-party-preferred result
Country	Winton Turnbull		76.9	+1.7
Labor	George Xeros		23.1	−1.7
Country hold		Swing	+1.7	

==== 1955 ====
1955 Australian federal election: Mallee
Party	Candidate	Votes	%	±%
Country	Winton Turnbull	24,303	65.6	−34.4
Labor	William Nicholas	7,933	21.4	+21.4
Labor (A-C)	Edwin Leyden	4,837	13.0	+13.0
Total formal votes		37,073	97.4	
Informal votes		985	2.6	
Turnout		38,058	95.9	
Two-party-preferred result
Country	Winton Turnbull		75.2	−24.8
Labor	William Nicholas		24.8	+24.8
Country hold		Swing	−24.8	

==== 1954 ====
1954 Australian federal election: Mallee
Party	Candidate	Votes	%	±%
Country	Winton Turnbull	unopposed		
Country hold		Swing		

==== 1951 ====
1951 Australian federal election: Mallee
Party	Candidate	Votes	%	±%
Country	Winton Turnbull	21,784	61.7	−2.9
Labor	Alfred O'Connor	13,542	38.3	+2.9
Total formal votes		35,326	98.5	
Informal votes		527	1.5	
Turnout		35,853	97.5	
Country hold		Swing	−2.9	

=== Elections in the 1940s ===
==== 1949 ====
1949 Australian federal election: Mallee
Party	Candidate	Votes	%	±%
Country	Winton Turnbull	22,658	64.6	+4.9
Labor	Alfred O'Connor	12,410	35.4	−4.9
Total formal votes		35,068	98.5	
Informal votes		533	1.5	
Turnout		35,601	96.2	
Country notional hold		Swing	+4.9	
