= Results of the 2007 Australian federal election in Victoria =

2007 Australian federal election (Victoria)
← 2004	24 November 2007	2010 →

All 37 Victorian seats in the Australian House of Representatives and 6 seats in the Australian Senate
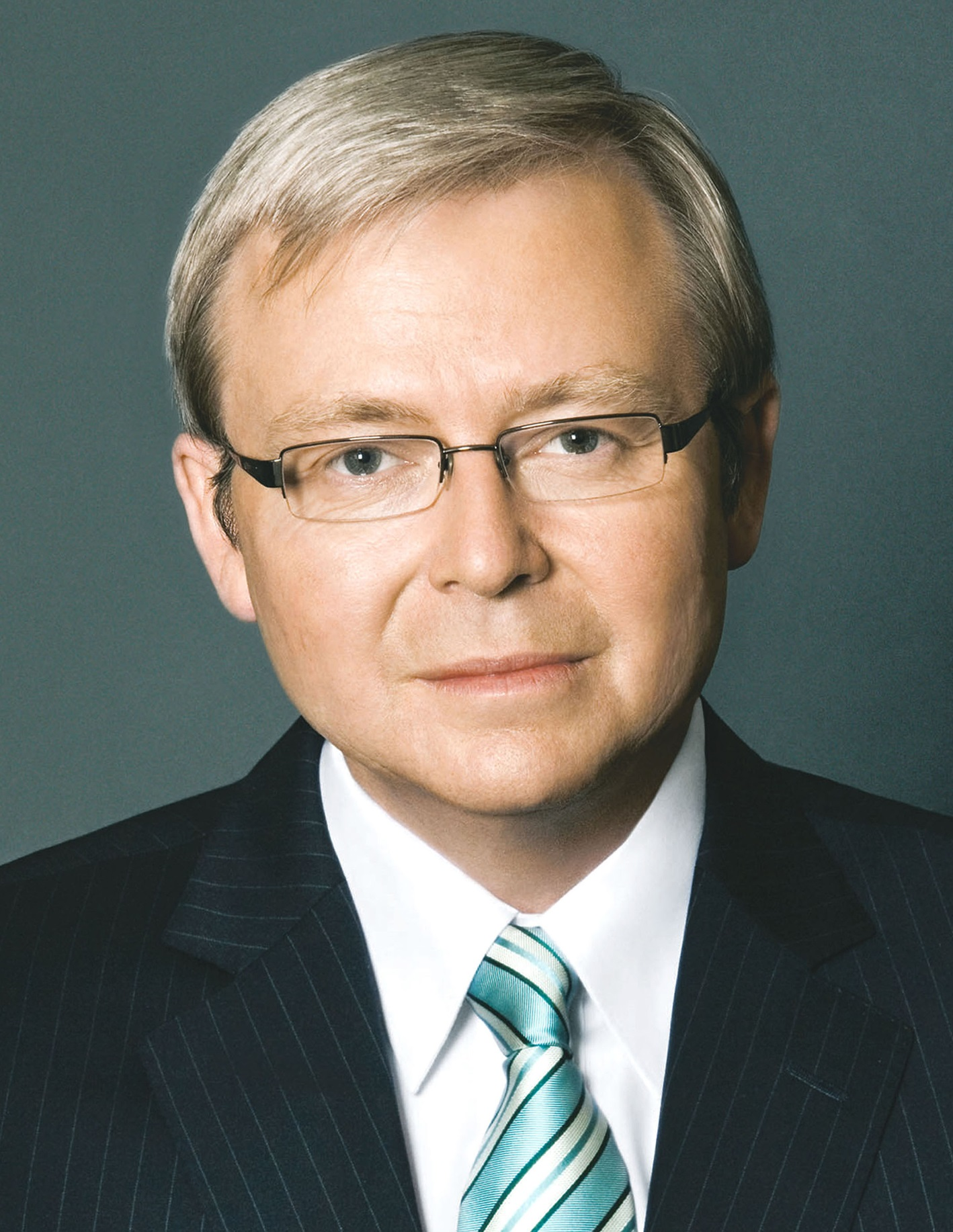

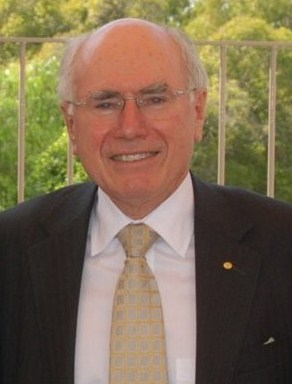
	First party	Second party
Leader	Kevin Rudd	John Howard
Party	Labor	Liberal/National coalition
Last election	19 seats	18 seats
Seats won	21 seats	16 seats
Seat change	▲2	▼2
Popular vote	1,416,215	1,302,785
Percentage	44.69%	41.11%
Swing	▲4.24	▼5.64
TPP	54.27%	45.73%
TPP swing	▲5.27	▼5.27
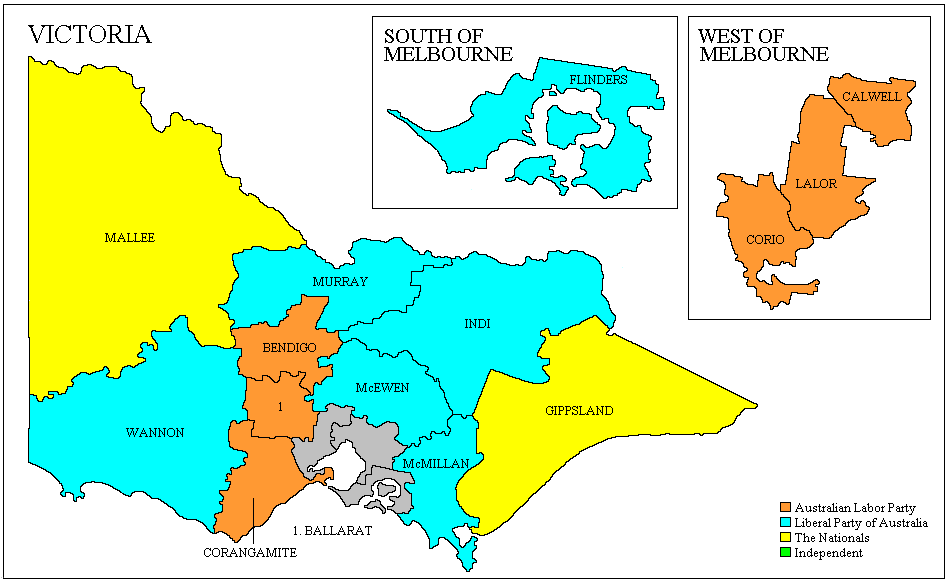
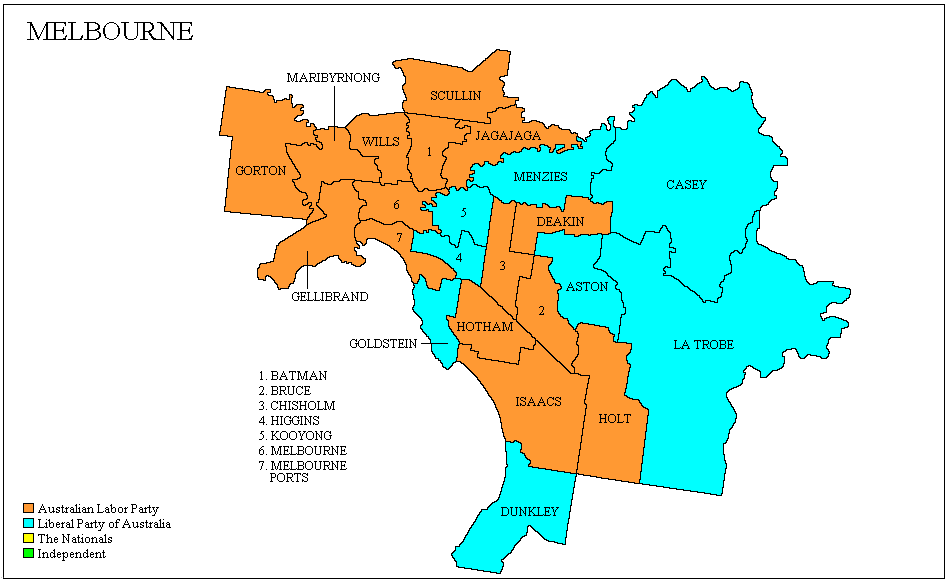

This is a list of electoral division results for the Australian 2007 federal election in the state of Victoria.

== Overall results ==
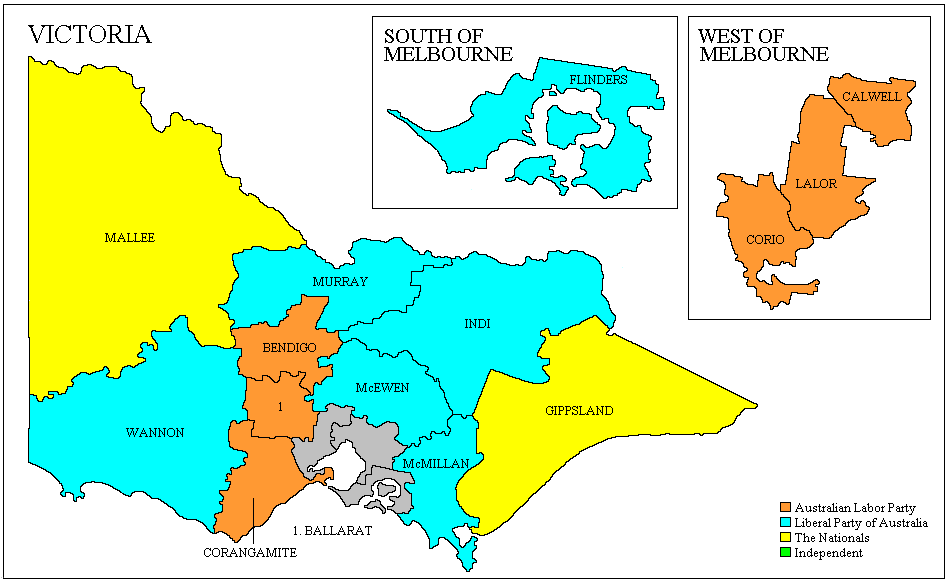
Electoral divisions: Victoria

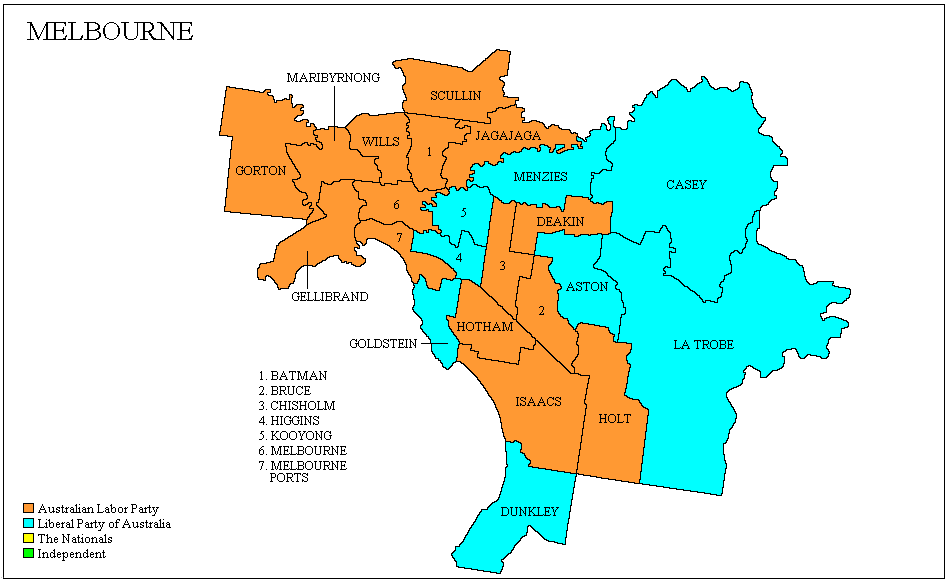
Electoral divisions: Melbourne area

Turnout 95.17% (CV) — Informal 3.26%
Party	Votes	%	Swing	Seats	Change
Labor	1,416,215	44.69	+4.24	21	▲2
Liberal	1,206,926	38.09	–5.15	14	▼2
National	95,859	3.02	–0.49	2	Steady
Liberal–National coalition	1,302,785	41.11	−5.64	16	▼2
Greens	258,846	8.17	+0.72		
Family First	95,663	3.02	+0.64		
Democrats	38,814	1.22	+0.15		
Citizens Electoral Council	8,656	0.27	–0.20		
Democratic Labor	6,018	0.19	+0.14		
Liberty and Democracy Party	3,280	0.10	+0.10		
Socialist Alliance	2,290	0.07	–0.05		
What Women Want	1,825	0.06	+0.06		
Christian Democrats	1,211	0.04	+0.02		
Socialist Equality	691	0.02	+0.02		
One Nation	433	0.01	–0.13		
Independents	31,645	1.00	+0.00		
Not Affiliated	539	0.02	–0.05		
Total	3,168,899			37	
Two-party-preferred vote
Labor	1,719,749	54.27	+5.27	21	▲2
Liberal/National coalition	1,449,150	45.73	–5.27	16	▼2
Invalid/blank votes	106,721	3.26	−0.84		
Registered voters/turnout	3,441,822	95.17			
Source: Commonwealth Election 2007

Liberal to Labor: Corangamite, Deakin.

== Results by division ==
=== Aston ===
2007 Australian federal election: Aston
Party	Candidate	Votes	%	±%
Liberal	Chris Pearce	43,519	50.71	−7.84
Labor	Gerry Raleigh	33,332	38.84	+7.67
Greens	Adam Pepper	4,492	5.23	+0.37
Family First	Peter Lake	2,978	3.47	+0.66
Democrats	Rachal Aza	1,246	1.45	+0.22
Citizens Electoral Council	Doug Mitchell	245	0.29	−0.39
Total formal votes		85,812	97.06	+1.26
Informal votes		2,601	2.94	−1.26
Turnout		88,413	96.35	+0.34
Two-party-preferred result
Liberal	Chris Pearce	47,243	55.05	−8.10
Labor	Gerry Raleigh	38,569	44.95	+8.10
Liberal hold		Swing	−8.10	

=== Ballarat ===
2007 Australian federal election: Ballarat
Party	Candidate	Votes	%	±%
Labor	Catherine King	44,191	50.33	+5.33
Liberal	Samantha McIntosh	33,402	38.04	−6.53
Greens	Belinda Coates	7,008	7.98	+1.25
Family First	Dale Butterfield	3,207	3.65	+1.50
Total formal votes		87,808	97.59	+0.93
Informal votes		2,170	2.41	−0.93
Turnout		89,978	96.11	+0.15
Two-party-preferred result
Labor	Catherine King	51,056	58.15	+5.92
Liberal	Samantha McIntosh	36,752	41.85	−5.92
Labor hold		Swing	+5.92	

=== Batman ===
2007 Australian federal election: Batman
Party	Candidate	Votes	%	±%
Labor	Martin Ferguson	45,551	57.18	+1.65
Liberal	Jonathan Peart	16,439	20.64	−5.31
Greens	Patricia Carey	13,674	17.17	+3.24
Family First	Peter Kerin	2,090	2.62	+1.49
Democrats	Darren Hassan	1,619	2.03	+0.57
Citizens Electoral Council	Robert Barwick	288	0.36	+0.13
Total formal votes		79,661	96.18	+2.02
Informal votes		3,167	3.82	−2.02
Turnout		82,828	94.07	+0.50
Two-party-preferred result
Labor	Martin Ferguson	60,503	75.95	+4.63
Liberal	Jonathan Peart	19,158	24.05	−4.63
Labor hold		Swing	+4.63	

=== Bendigo ===
2007 Australian federal election: Bendigo
Party	Candidate	Votes	%	±%
Labor	Steve Gibbons	42,410	47.14	+3.61
Liberal	Peter Kennedy	34,562	38.42	−7.02
Greens	Toby Byrne	6,521	7.25	+0.32
Family First	Terry Jarvis	3,190	3.55	−0.12
Independent	Eril Rathjen	1,865	2.07	+2.07
Democrats	Edward Guymer	577	0.64	+0.64
Independent	Adam Veitch	331	0.37	+0.37
Independent	Peter Consandine	304	0.34	+0.34
Liberty & Democracy	Clinton Gale	210	0.23	+0.23
Total formal votes		89,970	96.46	−0.67
Informal votes		3,305	3.54	+0.67
Turnout		93,275	95.96	−0.24
Two-party-preferred result
Labor	Steve Gibbons	50,504	56.13	+5.17
Liberal	Peter Kennedy	39,466	43.87	−5.17
Labor hold		Swing	+5.17	

=== Bruce ===
2007 Australian federal election: Bruce
Party	Candidate	Votes	%	±%
Labor	Alan Griffin	41,754	51.85	+4.55
Liberal	Angela Randall	30,257	37.57	−5.52
Greens	Rob Cassidy	4,102	5.09	−0.15
Family First	Bronwyn Rawlins	2,295	2.85	+0.22
Democrats	Richard Grossi	1,012	1.26	−0.12
Christian Democrats	Sandra Herrmann	678	0.84	+0.84
One Nation	Neil Smith	433	0.54	+0.54
Total formal votes		80,531	96.29	+0.72
Informal votes		3,106	3.71	−0.72
Turnout		83,637	94.62	+0.27
Two-party-preferred result
Labor	Alan Griffin	46,966	58.32	+4.84
Liberal	Angela Randall	33,565	41.68	−4.84
Labor hold		Swing	+4.84	

=== Calwell ===
2007 Australian federal election: Calwell
Party	Candidate	Votes	%	±%
Labor	Maria Vamvakinou	51,952	60.22	+10.21
Liberal	Dianne Livett	22,906	26.55	−10.62
Greens	Brook Shaune	3,761	4.36	−0.90
Family First	Arthur Buller	3,747	4.34	+1.98
Citizens Electoral Council	Sleiman Yohanna	1,817	2.11	−0.09
Democrats	Vanessa Musolino	799	0.93	−0.56
Independent	Philip Cutler	624	0.72	+0.72
Independent	Don Hampshire	391	0.45	+0.45
Socialist Equality	Frank Gaglioti	273	0.32	+0.32
Total formal votes		86,270	95.15	+0.39
Informal votes		4,399	4.85	−0.39
Turnout		90,669	94.82	−0.53
Two-party-preferred result
Labor	Maria Vamvakinou	59,807	69.33	+11.14
Liberal	Dianne Livett	26,463	30.67	−11.14
Labor hold		Swing	+11.14	

=== Casey ===
2007 Australian federal election: Casey
Party	Candidate	Votes	%	±%
Liberal	Tony Smith	41,897	50.15	−6.12
Labor	Dympna Beard	29,949	35.85	+6.17
Greens	Salore Craig	6,112	7.32	−0.55
Family First	Daniel Harrison	3,501	4.19	+0.14
Democrats	Tony Inglese	1,546	1.85	+0.60
Christian Democrats	George Moran	533	0.64	+0.64
Total formal votes		83,538	97.22	+1.07
Informal votes		2,389	2.78	−1.07
Turnout		85,927	96.21	+0.44
Two-party-preferred result
Liberal	Tony Smith	46,726	55.93	−5.42
Labor	Dympna Beard	36,812	44.07	+5.42
Liberal hold		Swing	−5.42	

=== Chisholm ===
2007 Australian federal election: Chisholm
Party	Candidate	Votes	%	±%
Labor	Anna Burke	38,439	48.12	+4.13
Liberal	Myles King	31,514	39.45	−4.16
Greens	Alistair McCaskill	6,765	8.47	+1.13
Family First	Gary Ong	1,953	2.45	+0.56
Democrats	Daniel Berk	1,053	1.32	−0.69
Citizens Electoral Council	Lars Thystrup	150	0.19	+0.01
Total formal votes		79,874	97.39	+0.74
Informal votes		2,139	2.61	−0.74
Turnout		82,013	95.22	+0.38
Two-party-preferred result
Labor	Anna Burke	45,833	57.38	+4.73
Liberal	Myles King	34,041	42.62	−4.73
Labor hold		Swing	+4.73	

=== Corangamite ===
2007 Australian federal election: Corangamite
Party	Candidate	Votes	%	±%
Liberal	Stewart McArthur	40,408	44.70	−7.35
Labor	Darren Cheeseman	37,886	41.91	+5.16
Greens	Fiona Nelson	7,202	7.97	+0.46
Family First	Jan Edwards	3,217	3.56	+0.82
Democrats	Gabrielle Killeen	1,512	1.67	+1.67
Liberty & Democracy	Sukrit Sabhlok	169	0.19	+0.19
Total formal votes		90,394	97.47	+0.51
Informal votes		2,347	2.53	−0.51
Turnout		92,741	96.45	+0.39
Two-party-preferred result
Labor	Darren Cheeseman	45,968	50.85	+6.17
Liberal	Stewart McArthur	44,426	49.15	−6.17
Labor gain from Liberal		Swing	+6.17	

=== Corio ===
2007 Australian federal election: Corio
Party	Candidate	Votes	%	±%
Labor	Richard Marles	37,778	45.49	−1.19
Liberal	Angelo Kakouros	24,591	29.61	−10.68
Independent	Gavan O'Connor	10,530	12.68	+12.68
Greens	Rob Leach	4,910	5.91	+0.00
Family First	Gordon Alderson	3,291	3.96	+1.37
Liberty & Democracy	Darrin Welden	791	0.95	+0.95
Democrats	Erica Menheere-Thompson	628	0.76	+0.76
Socialist Alliance	Chris Johnson	332	0.40	−0.23
Citizens Electoral Council	Ross Russell	190	0.23	−0.08
Total formal votes		83,041	96.27	+0.65
Informal votes		3,213	3.73	−0.65
Turnout		86,254	95.36	+0.33
Two-party-preferred result
Labor	Richard Marles	48,939	58.93	+3.29
Liberal	Angelo Kakouros	34,102	41.07	−3.29
Labor hold		Swing	+3.29	

=== Deakin ===
2007 Australian federal election: Deakin
Party	Candidate	Votes	%	±%
Liberal	Phil Barresi	36,501	44.35	−6.24
Labor	Mike Symon	34,451	41.86	+5.71
Greens	Bill Pemberton	6,978	8.48	+0.62
Family First	Fiona Bronte	2,589	3.15	+0.81
Democrats	Paul Nicholson	1,205	1.46	−0.51
Liberty & Democracy	Nick Stevenson	586	0.71	+0.71
Total formal votes		82,310	97.91	+0.97
Informal votes		1,756	2.09	−0.97
Turnout		84,066	95.84	+0.41
Two-party-preferred result
Labor	Mike Symon	42,319	51.41	+6.38
Liberal	Phil Barresi	39,991	48.59	−6.38
Labor gain from Liberal		Swing	+6.38	

=== Dunkley ===
2007 Australian federal election: Dunkley
Party	Candidate	Votes	%	±%
Liberal	Bruce Billson	43,024	49.79	−5.75
Labor	Graham McBride	33,055	38.26	+4.69
Greens	Neale Adams	6,695	7.75	+1.51
Family First	Steven Ashdown	2,235	2.59	+0.24
Democrats	Karen Bailey	1,395	1.61	+0.39
Total formal votes		86,404	97.38	+1.29
Informal votes		2,328	2.62	−1.29
Turnout		88,732	95.24	+0.16
Two-party-preferred result
Liberal	Bruce Billson	46,693	54.04	−5.34
Labor	Graham McBride	39,711	45.96	+5.34
Liberal hold		Swing	−5.34	

=== Flinders ===
2007 Australian federal election: Flinders
Party	Candidate	Votes	%	±%
Liberal	Greg Hunt	48,343	54.47	−3.70
Labor	Gary March	30,073	33.88	+2.99
Greens	Bob Brown	7,529	8.48	+2.21
Family First	Cameron Eastman	1,988	2.24	+0.51
Democrats	David Batten	822	0.93	+0.07
Total formal votes		88,755	97.22	+1.56
Informal votes		2,538	2.78	−1.56
Turnout		91,293	95.49	+0.19
Two-party-preferred result
Liberal	Greg Hunt	51,697	58.25	−2.86
Labor	Gary March	37,058	41.75	+2.86
Liberal hold		Swing	−2.86	

=== Gellibrand ===
2007 Australian federal election: Gellibrand
Party	Candidate	Votes	%	±%
Labor	Nicola Roxon	50,681	60.22	+5.60
Liberal	Wayne Tseng	19,220	22.84	−8.73
Greens	Robert Gibson	7,898	9.38	+0.30
Independent	Dave O'Neil	1,950	2.32	+2.32
Family First	Mukesh Garg	1,700	2.02	+0.18
Socialist Alliance	Ben Courtice	1,334	1.59	+0.95
Democrats	Rachel Richards	1,088	1.29	−0.01
Citizens Electoral Council	Rodney Doel	285	0.34	+0.15
Total formal votes		84,156	95.78	+2.35
Informal votes		3,712	4.22	−2.35
Turnout		87,868	94.20	+0.80
Two-party-preferred result
Labor	Nicola Roxon	60,134	71.46	+6.51
Liberal	Wayne Tseng	24,022	28.54	−6.51
Labor hold		Swing	+6.51	

=== Gippsland ===
2007 Australian federal election: Gippsland
Party	Candidate	Votes	%	±%
National	Peter McGauran	42,632	48.37	−0.36
Labor	Jane Rowe	32,214	36.55	+2.46
Greens	Jeff Wrathall	4,881	5.54	+1.16
Family First	Michael Rowell	3,802	4.31	+1.49
Independent	Ben Buckley	2,787	3.16	+3.16
What Women Want	Helen McAdam	1,825	2.07	+2.07
Total formal votes		88,141	97.02	+1.25
Informal votes		2,710	2.98	−1.25
Turnout		90,851	95.75	+0.12
Two-party-preferred result
National	Peter McGauran	49,280	55.91	−1.79
Labor	Jane Rowe	38,861	44.09	+1.79
National hold		Swing	−1.79	

=== Goldstein ===
2007 Australian federal election: Goldstein
Party	Candidate	Votes	%	±%
Liberal	Andrew Robb	45,141	52.92	−3.06
Labor	Julia Mason	28,734	33.69	+3.23
Greens	Neil Pilling	8,846	10.37	+1.51
Democrats	Michael Bailey	1,422	1.67	+0.44
Family First	Joyce Khoo	970	1.14	−0.19
Citizens Electoral Council	Colin Horne	186	0.22	+0.01
Total formal votes		85,299	97.58	+0.98
Informal votes		2,112	2.42	−0.98
Turnout		87,411	95.00	+0.40
Two-party-preferred result
Liberal	Andrew Robb	47,811	56.05	−3.98
Labor	Julia Mason	37,488	43.95	+3.98
Liberal hold		Swing	−3.98	

=== Gorton ===
2007 Australian federal election: Gorton
Party	Candidate	Votes	%	±%
Labor	Brendan O'Connor	58,732	61.93	+2.56
Liberal	Susan Jennison	23,063	24.32	−8.10
Greens	Huong Truong	5,775	6.09	+0.99
Family First	Scott Amberley	3,746	3.95	+1.46
Democratic Labor	Vern Hughes	3,516	3.71	+3.71
Total formal votes		94,832	95.56	+0.62
Informal votes		4,405	4.44	−0.62
Turnout		99,237	95.00	+0.96
Two-party-preferred result
Labor	Brendan O'Connor	67,535	71.22	+6.32
Liberal	Susan Jennison	27,297	28.78	−6.32
Labor hold		Swing	+6.32	

=== Higgins ===
2007 Australian federal election: Higgins
Party	Candidate	Votes	%	±%
Liberal	Peter Costello	43,761	53.61	−1.69
Labor	Barbara Norman	25,367	31.08	+0.58
Greens	Michael Wilbur-Ham	8,777	10.75	−0.60
Independent	Stephen Mayne	1,615	1.98	+1.98
Democrats	Mary Dettman	990	1.21	−0.61
Family First	Penny Badwal	627	0.77	−0.06
Independent	Genevieve Maria Forde	265	0.32	+0.32
Independent	Graeme Meddings	227	0.28	+0.28
Total formal votes		81,629	97.43	+0.19
Informal votes		2,150	2.57	−0.19
Turnout		83,779	93.78	+0.81
Two-party-preferred result
Liberal	Peter Costello	46,559	57.04	−1.72
Labor	Barbara Norman	35,070	42.96	+1.72
Liberal hold		Swing	−1.72	

=== Holt ===
2007 Australian federal election: Holt
Party	Candidate	Votes	%	±%
Labor	Anthony Byrne	51,689	55.65	+9.98
Liberal	Emanuele Cicchiello	31,785	34.22	−8.63
Family First	Yasmin de Zilwa	4,076	4.39	+0.22
Greens	Lynette Keleher	3,823	4.12	−0.34
Democrats	Ken Seymour	1,155	1.24	−0.18
Citizens Electoral Council	Chris Morgan	347	0.37	−1.06
Total formal votes		92,875	96.44	+0.79
Informal votes		3,430	3.56	−0.79
Turnout		96,305	95.46	+0.41
Two-party-preferred result
Labor	Anthony Byrne	57,237	61.63	+10.12
Liberal	Emanuele Cicchiello	35,638	38.37	−10.12
Labor hold		Swing	+10.12	

=== Hotham ===
2007 Australian federal election: Hotham
Party	Candidate	Votes	%	±%
Labor	Simon Crean	44,853	55.15	+3.93
Liberal	Vince Arborea	27,451	33.75	−5.22
Greens	Matthew Billman	5,572	6.85	+1.46
Family First	Peter Dorian	1,657	2.04	−0.53
Democrats	Craig Cadby	800	0.98	−0.25
Democratic Labor	Terry Farrell	758	0.93	+0.93
Citizens Electoral Council	Mike Woodward	240	0.30	+0.02
Total formal votes		81,331	96.70	+0.94
Informal votes		2,772	3.30	−0.94
Turnout		84,103	94.85	+0.30
Two-party-preferred result
Labor	Simon Crean	51,240	63.00	+5.60
Liberal	Vince Arborea	30,091	37.00	−5.60
Labor hold		Swing	+5.60	

=== Indi ===
2007 Australian federal election: Indi
Party	Candidate	Votes	%	±%
Liberal	Sophie Mirabella	46,052	54.38	−8.25
Labor	Zuvele Leschen	27,203	32.12	+5.89
Greens	Helen Robinson	6,416	7.58	+1.15
Family First	Jim Rainey	3,232	3.82	−0.22
Democrats	Sarah Benson	1,434	1.69	+1.69
Citizens Electoral Council	Jeremy Beck	354	0.42	−0.25
Total formal votes		84,691	97.32	+0.20
Informal votes		2,332	2.68	−0.20
Turnout		87,023	95.77	+0.40
Two-party-preferred result
Liberal	Sophie Mirabella	50,132	59.19	−7.10
Labor	Zuvele Leschen	34,559	40.81	+7.10
Liberal hold		Swing	−7.10	

=== Isaacs ===
2007 Australian federal election: Isaacs
Party	Candidate	Votes	%	±%
Labor	Mark Dreyfus	44,056	48.76	+4.45
Liberal	Ross Fox	34,762	38.47	−4.82
Greens	Colin Long	5,636	6.24	−1.07
Family First	Jadah Pleiter	2,308	2.55	+0.15
Democrats	Laura Chipp	1,970	2.18	+1.15
Independent	Gordon Ford	1,137	1.26	+0.49
Liberty & Democracy	Robert Norrie	492	0.54	+0.54
Total formal votes		90,361	96.69	+1.73
Informal votes		3,092	3.31	−1.73
Turnout		93,453	95.18	−0.07
Two-party-preferred result
Labor	Mark Dreyfus	52,131	57.69	+6.21
Liberal	Ross Fox	38,230	42.31	−6.21
Labor hold		Swing	+6.21	

=== Jagajaga ===
2007 Australian federal election: Jagajaga
Party	Candidate	Votes	%	±%
Labor	Jenny Macklin	42,154	48.16	+3.38
Liberal	Conrad D'Souza	32,870	37.55	−4.78
Greens	Lisa Hodgson	8,971	10.25	+1.94
Family First	Andrew Conlon	2,065	2.36	+0.07
Democrats	Jason Graham	979	1.12	−0.03
Citizens Electoral Council	Stephen Lele	496	0.56	+0.38
Total formal votes		87,535	97.55	+1.53
Informal votes		2,196	2.45	−1.53
Turnout		89,731	95.70	+0.21
Two-party-preferred result
Labor	Jenny Macklin	51,630	58.98	+4.58
Liberal	Conrad D'Souza	35,905	41.02	−4.58
Labor hold		Swing	+4.58	

=== Kooyong ===
2007 Australian federal election: Kooyong
Party	Candidate	Votes	%	±%
Liberal	Petro Georgiou	45,172	55.14	+0.48
Labor	Ken Harvey	24,599	30.03	+1.02
Greens	Peter Campbell	9,686	11.82	−0.72
Family First	John Laidler	1,261	1.54	+0.16
Democrats	David Collyer	1,056	1.29	−0.56
Citizens Electoral Council	Pierre Curtis	154	0.19	−0.37
Total formal votes		81,928	97.90	+0.80
Informal votes		1,756	2.10	−0.80
Turnout		83,684	94.75	+0.49
Two-party-preferred result
Liberal	Petro Georgiou	48,775	59.53	−0.05
Labor	Ken Harvey	33,153	40.47	+0.05
Liberal hold		Swing	−0.05	

=== La Trobe ===
2007 Australian federal election: La Trobe
Party	Candidate	Votes	%	±%
Liberal	Jason Wood	39,636	46.48	−4.74
Labor	Rodney Cocks	34,448	40.39	+6.62
Greens	Bree Taylor	7,539	8.84	−0.57
Family First	Jim Zubic	2,423	2.84	+0.49
Democrats	Craig Beale	1,012	1.19	−0.30
Citizens Electoral Council	Kurt Beilharz	140	0.16	−0.01
Liberty & Democracy	Surome Singh	85	0.10	+0.10
Total formal votes		85,283	96.72	+0.74
Informal votes		2,896	3.28	−0.74
Turnout		88,179	95.82	+0.36
Two-party-preferred result
Liberal	Jason Wood	43,077	50.51	−5.32
Labor	Rodney Cocks	42,206	49.49	+5.32
Liberal hold		Swing	−5.32	

=== Lalor ===
2007 Australian federal election: Lalor
Party	Candidate	Votes	%	±%
Labor	Julia Gillard	57,208	59.89	+6.64
Liberal	Peter Curtis	28,435	29.77	−7.68
Family First	Steve Gleeson	4,199	4.40	+1.22
Greens	Jay Tilley	3,836	4.02	−0.10
Democratic Labor	Libby Krepp	969	1.01	+1.01
Democrats	Roger Howe	879	0.92	−0.52
Total formal votes		95,526	96.51	+1.36
Informal votes		3,457	3.49	−1.36
Turnout		98,983	95.40	−0.04
Two-party-preferred result
Labor	Julia Gillard	62,600	65.53	+6.74
Liberal	Peter Curtis	32,936	34.47	−6.74
Labor hold		Swing	+6.74	

=== Mallee ===
2007 Australian federal election: Mallee
Party	Candidate	Votes	%	±%
National	John Forrest	53,227	63.94	−4.48
Labor	John Zigouras	18,187	21.85	+1.54
Family First	Glenn Coulthard	5,435	6.53	+2.01
Greens	Liam Farrelly	3,468	4.17	+0.39
Democrats	Vikki McLeod	2,323	2.79	+1.24
Citizens Electoral Council	Chris Lahy	600	0.72	−0.71
Total formal votes		83,240	96.41	−0.10
Informal votes		3,101	3.59	+0.10
Turnout		86,341	95.82	+0.00
Two-party-preferred result
National	John Forrest	59,328	71.27	−3.48
Labor	John Zigouras	23,912	28.73	+3.48
National hold		Swing	−3.48	

=== Maribyrnong ===
2007 Australian federal election: Maribyrnong
Party	Candidate	Votes	%	±%
Labor	Bill Shorten	45,528	57.57	+6.24
Liberal	Ian Soylemez	23,741	30.02	−7.48
Greens	Bob Muntz	5,396	6.82	−0.04
Family First	Ian Keeling	2,039	2.58	+0.73
Democrats	Robert Livesay	1,242	1.57	−0.05
Citizens Electoral Council	Andre Kozlowski	1,141	1.44	+0.60
Total formal votes		79,087	96.02	+0.88
Informal votes		3,277	3.98	−0.88
Turnout		82,364	94.15	+0.11
Two-party-preferred result
Labor	Bill Shorten	51,657	65.32	+5.85
Liberal	Ian Soylemez	27,430	34.68	−5.85
Labor hold		Swing	+5.85	

=== McEwen ===
2007 Australian federal election: McEwen (Note: The AEC results have been used, however they do not correspond with the tally set out in paragraph 84 of the reasons for judgment of the Court of Disputed Returns in Mitchell v Bailey (No.2) [2008] FCA 692.)
Party	Candidate	Votes	%	±%
Liberal	Fran Bailey	44,165	45.76	−5.98
Labor	Rob Mitchell	38,819	40.22	+5.67
Greens	Steve Meacher	8,379	8.68	+1.03
Family First	Ian Cranson	2,398	2.48	+0.76
Democrats	David Kane	948	0.98	+0.16
Independent	Darren Trueman	849	0.88	+0.88
Liberty & Democracy	Robert Newnham	799	0.83	+0.83
Citizens Electoral Council	Rod McLennan	161	0.17	−0.05
Total formal votes		96,518	95.91	+0.57
Informal votes		3,982	4.09	−0.57
Turnout		100,634	96.29	+0.18
Two-party-preferred result
Liberal	Fran Bailey	48,339	50.01	−6.41
Labor	Rob Mitchell	48,308	49.99	+6.41
Liberal hold		Swing	−6.41	

Rob Mitchell (Labor) was initially announced as the winning candidate, by a mere seven votes. The first recount reduced this margin to five. The second re-count overturned the result with Fran Bailey (Liberal) instead winning by 12 votes. The Court of Disputed Returns later increased this margin to 27 votes.

=== McMillan ===
2007 Australian federal election: McMillan
Party	Candidate	Votes	%	±%
Liberal	Russell Broadbent	40,254	49.93	+7.00
Labor	Christine Maxfield	30,743	38.14	+0.28
Greens	Sandra Betts	4,839	6.00	+1.52
Family First	Terry Aeschlimann	2,370	2.94	+1.23
Democrats	Don Walters	1,206	1.50	+0.65
Democratic Labor	Suryan Chandrasegaran	775	0.96	+0.61
Citizens Electoral Council	Theo Alblas	287	0.36	+0.19
Liberty & Democracy	Ben Fiechtner	141	0.17	+0.17
Total formal votes		80,615	96.57	+1.06
Informal votes		2,859	3.43	−1.06
Turnout		83,474	95.85	−0.04
Two-party-preferred result
Liberal	Russell Broadbent	44,172	54.79	−0.20
Labor	Christine Maxfield	36,443	45.21	+0.20
Liberal hold		Swing	−0.20	

=== Melbourne ===
2007 Australian federal election: Melbourne
Party	Candidate	Votes	%	±%
Labor	Lindsay Tanner	43,363	49.51	−2.27
Liberal	Andrea Del Ciotto	20,577	23.49	−1.60
Greens	Adam Bandt	19,967	22.80	+3.82
Democrats	Tim Wright	1,255	1.43	−0.20
Family First	Georgia Pearson	878	1.00	+0.12
Citizens Electoral Council	Andrew Reed	586	0.67	+0.49
Independent Socialist	Kylie McGregor	539	0.62	+0.62
Socialist Equality	Will Marshall	418	0.48	+0.48
Total formal votes		87,583	97.20	+0.47
Informal votes		2,521	2.80	−0.47
Turnout		90,104	91.52	+0.45
Notional two-party-preferred count
Labor	Lindsay Tanner	63,299	72.27	+1.13
Liberal	Andrea Del Ciotto	24,284	27.73	−1.13
Two-candidate-preferred result
Labor	Lindsay Tanner	47,916	54.71	−16.43
Greens	Adam Bandt	39,667	45.29	+45.29
Labor hold		Swing	−16.43	

=== Melbourne Ports ===
2007 Australian federal election: Melbourne Ports
Party	Candidate	Votes	%	±%
Labor	Michael Danby	36,556	42.47	+3.22
Liberal	Adam Held	34,154	39.68	−3.26
Greens	Phillip Walker	12,941	15.03	+0.93
Democrats	John Mathieson	1,527	1.77	+0.42
Family First	Rebecca Gebbing	731	0.85	+0.31
Citizens Electoral Council	Aaron Isherwood	172	0.20	+0.02
Total formal votes		86,081	97.84	+1.24
Informal votes		1,903	2.16	−1.24
Turnout		87,984	91.71	+0.58
Two-party-preferred result
Labor	Michael Danby	49,191	57.15	+3.41
Liberal	Adam Held	36,890	42.85	−3.41
Labor hold		Swing	+3.41	

=== Menzies ===
2007 Australian federal election: Menzies
Party	Candidate	Votes	%	±%
Liberal	Kevin Andrews	43,393	51.60	−5.19
Labor	Andrew Campbell	29,249	34.78	+1.99
Greens	David Ellis	5,291	6.29	−0.17
Independent	Philip Nitschke	3,297	3.92	+3.92
Family First	Ken Smithies	2,036	2.42	+0.28
Democrats	Damian Wise	822	0.98	−0.53
Total formal votes		84,088	97.24	+0.85
Informal votes		2,385	2.76	−0.85
Turnout		86,473	96.12	+0.68
Two-party-preferred result
Liberal	Kevin Andrews	47,104	56.02	−4.65
Labor	Andrew Campbell	36,984	43.98	+4.65
Liberal hold		Swing	−4.65	

=== Murray ===
2007 Australian federal election: Murray
Party	Candidate	Votes	%	±%
Liberal	Sharman Stone	50,021	62.07	−3.46
Labor	Bob Scates	19,429	24.11	+4.34
Independent	Rob Bryant	4,373	5.43	−2.32
Family First	Serena Moore	2,674	3.32	+0.94
Greens	Ian Christoe	2,377	2.95	−0.10
Independent	Diane Teasdale	615	0.76	−0.59
Independent	Paul Merrigan	484	0.60	+0.60
Democrats	Sarina Isgro	416	0.52	+0.52
Citizens Electoral Council	Jeff Davy	203	0.25	+0.08
Total formal votes		80,592	94.76	−1.06
Informal votes		4,461	5.24	+1.06
Turnout		85,053	95.68	−0.09
Two-party-preferred result
Liberal	Sharman Stone	55,015	68.26	−5.82
Labor	Bob Scates	25,577	31.74	+5.82
Liberal hold		Swing	−5.82	

=== Scullin ===
2007 Australian federal election: Scullin
Party	Candidate	Votes	%	±%
Labor	Harry Jenkins	51,680	63.32	+4.30
Liberal	Charles Williams	19,910	24.39	−6.52
Greens	Linda Laos	4,918	6.03	+1.00
Family First	Tania Byers	3,859	4.73	+1.34
Democrats	Peter Hude	868	1.06	+1.06
Citizens Electoral Council	Simon Steer	386	0.47	−1.17
Total formal votes		81,621	95.94	+0.69
Informal votes		3,452	4.06	−0.69
Turnout		85,073	95.67	+0.10
Two-party-preferred result
Labor	Harry Jenkins	57,830	70.85	+6.06
Liberal	Charles Williams	23,791	29.15	−6.06
Labor hold		Swing	+6.06	

=== Wannon ===
2007 Australian federal election: Wannon
Party	Candidate	Votes	%	±%
Liberal	David Hawker	44,834	52.56	−5.27
Labor	Antony Moore	30,852	36.17	+4.32
Greens	Lisa Owen	5,953	6.98	+2.63
Family First	Daniel Pech	3,663	4.29	+1.31
Total formal votes		85,302	97.41	+0.79
Informal votes		2,266	2.59	−0.79
Turnout		87,568	96.33	+0.38
Two-party-preferred result
Liberal	David Hawker	49,020	57.47	−4.90
Labor	Antony Moore	36,282	42.53	+4.90
Liberal hold		Swing	−4.90	

=== Wills ===
2007 Australian federal election: Wills
Party	Candidate	Votes	%	±%
Labor	Kelvin Thomson	49,050	56.89	+3.07
Liberal	Claude Tomisich	21,166	24.55	−4.15
Greens	David Collis	11,912	13.82	+0.82
Democrats	Edward Clarke	2,005	2.33	+0.91
Family First	Ihab Kelada	1,233	1.43	−0.12
Socialist Alliance	Zane Alcorn	624	0.72	−0.34
Citizens Electoral Council	Craig Isherwood	227	0.26	−0.19
Total formal votes		86,217	95.67	+1.17
Informal votes		3,902	4.33	−1.17
Turnout		90,119	93.69	+0.70
Two-party-preferred result
Labor	Kelvin Thomson	62,432	72.41	+5.51
Liberal	Claude Tomisich	23,785	27.59	−5.51
Labor hold		Swing	+5.51	

== See also ==
- Results of the 2007 Australian federal election (House of Representatives)
- Post-election pendulum for the 2007 Australian federal election
- Members of the Australian House of Representatives, 2007–2010
