= Results of the 2004 Australian federal election in Victoria =

2004 Australian federal election (Victoria)
| ← 2001 | 9 October 2004 | 2007 → |

All 37 Victoria seats in the Australian House of Representatives and 6 seats in the Australian Senate

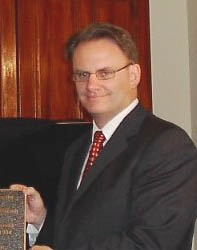
| | First party | Second party |
|---|---|---|
| Leader | John Howard | Mark Latham |
| Party | Liberal/National coalition | Labor |
| Last election | 18 seats | 19 seats |
| Seats won | 18 seats | 19 seats |
| Seat change | Steady | Steady |
| Popular vote | 1,407,615 | 1,217,921 |
| Percentage | 46.75% | 40.45% |
| Swing | ▲4.60 | ▲0.08 |
| TPP | 51.00% | 49.00% |
| TPP swing | ▲3.14 | ▼3.14 |

This is a list of electoral division results for the Australian 2004 federal election in the state of Victoria.

== Overall results ==
Turnout 94.84% (CV) — Informal 5.16%
| Party | Votes | % | Swing | Seats | Change |
|---|---|---|---|---|---|
| Liberal | 1,302,038 | 43.24 | +4.17 | 16 | Steady |
| National | 105,557 | 3.51 | +0.43 | 2 | Steady |
| Liberal–National coalition | 1,302,038 | 46.75 | +4.60 | 18 | Steady |
| Labor | 1,217,921 | 40.45 | –1.20 | 19 | Steady |
| Greens | 224,423 | 7.45 | +1.55 | | |
| Family First | 71,735 | 2.38 | +2.38 | | |
| Democrats | 32,363 | 1.07 | –5.18 | | |
| Citizens Electoral Council | 14,010 | 0.47 | +0.24 | | |
| One Nation | 4,119 | 0.14 | –1.14 | | |
| Socialist Alliance | 3,694 | 0.12 | 0.12 | | |
| Democratic Labor | 1,372 | 0.05 | 0.05 | | |
| No GST | 573 | 0.02 | -0.15 | | |
| Ex-Service, Service and Veterans | 527 | 0.02 | 0.02 | | |
| Christian Democrats | 459 | 0.02 | -0.19 | | |
| Aged and Disability Pensioners Party | 285 | 0.01 | 0.01 | | |
| Independents | 32,073 | 1.07 | -0.99 | | |
| Total | 3,139,881 | | | 37 | |
Two-party-preferred vote
| Liberal/National Coalition | 1,535,650 | 51.00 | +3.14 | 18 | Steady |
| Labor | 1,475,519 | 49.00 | –3.14 | 19 | Steady |
| Invalid/blank votes | 128,712 | 4.10 | +0.12 | | |
| Registered voters/turnout | 3,309,800 | 94.87 | | | |
Source: AEC Tally Room

In Victoria, the poor result seen in other states for Labor wasn't reflected. Labor was able to achieve above 40% of the primary vote in this state, its poorest since 1990. The Liberal Party performed strongly in Victoria recording their best results in the state since the election of 1954 with 43.2% of the primary vote. The National's and Green vote held steady in the state, while the Australian Democrat vote fell sharply to 1.1%.

== Results by division ==
=== Aston ===
2004 Australian federal election: Aston
| Party | Candidate | Votes | % | ±% |
|---|---|---|---|---|
| Liberal | Chris Pearce | 47,686 | 58.55 | +7.89 |
| Labor | Paul Morgan | 25,384 | 31.17 | −6.03 |
| Greens | Michael Abson | 3,957 | 4.86 | +1.32 |
| Family First | Peter Nathan | 2,290 | 2.81 | +2.81 |
| Democrats | Nahum Ayliffe | 998 | 1.23 | −5.77 |
| No GST | Nevil Brewer | 573 | 0.70 | +0.70 |
| Citizens Electoral Council | Doug Mitchell | 557 | 0.68 | +0.35 |
| Total formal votes | | 81,445 | 95.80 | −0.96 |
| Informal votes | | 3,570 | 4.20 | +0.96 |
| Turnout | | 85,015 | 96.01 | −0.43 |
Two-party-preferred result
| Liberal | Chris Pearce | 51,436 | 63.15 | +7.13 |
| Labor | Paul Morgan | 30,009 | 36.85 | −7.13 |
| Liberal hold | | Swing | +7.13 | |

=== Ballarat ===
2004 Australian federal election: Ballarat
| Party | Candidate | Votes | % | ±% |
|---|---|---|---|---|
| Labor | Catherine King | 37,734 | 45.00 | +0.50 |
| Liberal | Elizabeth Matuschka | 37,377 | 44.57 | +2.45 |
| Greens | Tony Kelly | 5,641 | 6.73 | +0.07 |
| Family First | Vlad Adamek | 1,799 | 2.14 | +2.14 |
| Democratic Labor | Claire Lindorff | 1,109 | 1.32 | +1.32 |
| Citizens Electoral Council | Valiant von Thule Halborg | 192 | 0.23 | +0.23 |
| Total formal votes | | 83,852 | 96.66 | −0.33 |
| Informal votes | | 2,901 | 3.34 | +0.33 |
| Turnout | | 86,753 | 95.96 | −0.35 |
Two-party-preferred result
| Labor | Catherine King | 43,795 | 52.23 | −1.02 |
| Liberal | Elizabeth Matuschka | 40,057 | 47.77 | +1.02 |
| Labor hold | | Swing | −1.02 | |

=== Batman ===
2004 Australian federal election: Batman
| Party | Candidate | Votes | % | ±% |
|---|---|---|---|---|
| Labor | Martin Ferguson | 41,953 | 55.53 | −3.37 |
| Liberal | Maxwell Gratton | 19,603 | 25.95 | +4.22 |
| Greens | Alex Bhathal | 10,520 | 13.93 | +2.54 |
| Democrats | Scott Kneebone | 1,105 | 1.46 | −4.78 |
| Family First | Chris Ariaratnam | 853 | 1.13 | +1.13 |
| Independent | Craig Bishop | 708 | 0.94 | +0.94 |
| Socialist Alliance | Graham Matthews | 430 | 0.57 | +0.57 |
| Socialist Equality | Peter Byrne | 201 | 0.27 | +0.27 |
| Citizens Electoral Council | Walter Hernan Mellado | 171 | 0.23 | −0.19 |
| Total formal votes | | 75,544 | 94.15 | −0.31 |
| Informal votes | | 4,686 | 5.84 | +0.31 |
| Turnout | | 80,230 | 93.57 | +0.22 |
Two-party-preferred result
| Labor | Martin Ferguson | 53,880 | 71.32 | −3.75 |
| Liberal | Maxwell Gratton | 21,664 | 28.68 | +3.75 |
| Labor hold | | Swing | −3.75 | |

=== Bendigo ===
2004 Australian federal election: Bendigo
| Party | Candidate | Votes | % | ±% |
|---|---|---|---|---|
| Liberal | Kevin Gibbins | 40,035 | 45.44 | +5.92 |
| Labor | Steve Gibbons | 38,356 | 43.53 | +0.04 |
| Greens | David Petersen | 6,108 | 6.93 | +1.29 |
| Family First | Nathan Hulls | 3,238 | 3.67 | +3.67 |
| Citizens Electoral Council | Vern White | 373 | 0.42 | +0.42 |
| Total formal votes | | 88,110 | 97.13 | +0.76 |
| Informal votes | | 2,599 | 2.87 | −0.76 |
| Turnout | | 90,709 | 96.20 | −0.22 |
Two-party-preferred result
| Labor | Steve Gibbons | 44,900 | 50.96 | −2.59 |
| Liberal | Kevin Gibbins | 43,210 | 49.04 | +2.59 |
| Labor hold | | Swing | −2.59 | |

=== Bruce ===
2004 Australian federal election: Bruce
| Party | Candidate | Votes | % | ±% |
|---|---|---|---|---|
| Labor | Alan Griffin | 37,109 | 47.30 | −2.28 |
| Liberal | Angela Randall | 33,807 | 43.09 | +3.61 |
| Greens | Tania Giles | 4,110 | 5.24 | +1.07 |
| Family First | Richard Warner | 2,064 | 2.63 | +2.63 |
| Democrats | Paul van den Bergen | 1,079 | 1.38 | −5.10 |
| Citizens Electoral Council | William Larner | 282 | 0.36 | +0.36 |
| Total formal votes | | 78,451 | 95.57 | −0.57 |
| Informal votes | | 3,634 | 4.43 | +0.57 |
| Turnout | | 82,085 | 94.35 | −0.95 |
Two-party-preferred result
| Labor | Alan Griffin | 41,954 | 53.48 | −3.00 |
| Liberal | Angela Randall | 36,497 | 46.52 | +3.00 |
| Labor hold | | Swing | −3.00 | |

=== Calwell ===
2004 Australian federal election: Calwell
| Party | Candidate | Votes | % | ±% |
|---|---|---|---|---|
| Labor | Maria Vamvakinou | 39,692 | 50.01 | −2.31 |
| Liberal | Dianne Livett | 29,504 | 37.17 | +8.60 |
| Greens | Mohamad Alman | 4,175 | 5.26 | +1.91 |
| Family First | Gary Canham | 1,870 | 2.36 | +2.36 |
| Citizens Electoral Council | Sleiman Yohanna | 1,745 | 2.20 | +1.72 |
| Independent | Denis Towers | 1,202 | 1.51 | +1.51 |
| Democrats | Jonathon Gatt | 1,180 | 1.49 | −2.91 |
| Total formal votes | | 79,368 | 94.76 | +0.33 |
| Informal votes | | 4,391 | 5.24 | −0.33 |
| Turnout | | 83,759 | 95.35 | +0.73 |
Two-party-preferred result
| Labor | Maria Vamvakinou | 46,184 | 58.19 | −7.04 |
| Liberal | Dianne Livett | 33,184 | 41.81 | +7.04 |
| Labor hold | | Swing | −7.04 | |

=== Casey ===
2004 Australian federal election: Casey
| Party | Candidate | Votes | % | ±% |
|---|---|---|---|---|
| Liberal | Tony Smith | 45,050 | 56.27 | +4.98 |
| Labor | Tony Dib | 23,762 | 29.68 | −3.58 |
| Greens | Joy Ringrose | 6,302 | 7.87 | +0.98 |
| Family First | Andrew Rushton | 3,243 | 4.05 | +4.05 |
| Democrats | Jos Vandersman | 1,002 | 1.25 | −7.31 |
| | Daniel Chapman | 531 | 0.66 | +0.66 |
| Citizens Electoral Council | Jeremy Beck | 167 | 0.21 | +0.21 |
| Total formal votes | | 80,057 | 96.15 | −0.27 |
| Informal votes | | 3,208 | 3.85 | +0.27 |
| Turnout | | 83,265 | 95.77 | +0.02 |
Two-party-preferred result
| Liberal | Tony Smith | 49,111 | 61.35 | +4.15 |
| Labor | Tony Dib | 30,946 | 38.65 | −4.15 |
| Liberal hold | | Swing | +4.15 | |

=== Chisholm ===
2004 Australian federal election: Chisholm
| Party | Candidate | Votes | % | ±% |
|---|---|---|---|---|
| Labor | Anna Burke | 34,241 | 43.99 | +1.61 |
| Liberal | Stephen Hartney | 33,945 | 43.61 | −0.01 |
| Greens | Penny Harris | 5,715 | 7.34 | +1.17 |
| Democrats | James Bennett | 1,561 | 2.01 | −4.73 |
| Family First | Gary Ong | 1,468 | 1.89 | +1.89 |
| Independent | Owen Lysaght | 763 | 0.98 | +0.98 |
| Citizens Electoral Council | Wayne Barwick | 137 | 0.18 | +0.18 |
| Total formal votes | | 77,830 | 96.65 | −0.34 |
| Informal votes | | 2,700 | 3.35 | +0.34 |
| Turnout | | 80,530 | 94.84 | −0.60 |
Two-party-preferred result
| Labor | Anna Burke | 40,980 | 52.65 | −0.03 |
| Liberal | Stephen Hartney | 36,850 | 47.35 | +0.03 |
| Labor hold | | Swing | −0.03 | |

=== Corangamite ===
2004 Australian federal election: Corangamite
| Party | Candidate | Votes | % | ±% |
|---|---|---|---|---|
| Liberal | Stewart McArthur | 44,060 | 52.05 | +4.89 |
| Labor | Peter McMullin | 31,105 | 36.75 | +3.20 |
| Greens | Stephen Chenery | 6,355 | 7.51 | +1.19 |
| Family First | Christine Modra | 2,318 | 2.74 | +2.74 |
| Socialist Alliance | Chris Johnson | 491 | 0.58 | +0.58 |
| Citizens Electoral Council | Andrew Bailey | 313 | 0.37 | +0.37 |
| Total formal votes | | 84,642 | 96.96 | +0.37 |
| Informal votes | | 2,652 | 3.04 | −0.37 |
| Turnout | | 87,294 | 96.06 | −0.18 |
Two-party-preferred result
| Liberal | Stewart McArthur | 46,828 | 55.32 | −0.05 |
| Labor | Peter McMullin | 37,814 | 44.68 | +0.05 |
| Liberal hold | | Swing | −0.05 | |

=== Corio ===
2004 Australian federal election: Corio
| Party | Candidate | Votes | % | ±% |
|---|---|---|---|---|
| Labor | Gavan O'Connor | 37,405 | 46.68 | −1.87 |
| Liberal | Bruce King | 32,289 | 40.29 | +3.91 |
| Greens | Brett Constable | 4,733 | 5.91 | +1.55 |
| Independent | Steve Malesic | 2,877 | 3.59 | +3.59 |
| Family First | Gordon Alderson | 2,077 | 2.59 | +2.59 |
| Socialist Alliance | Tim Gooden | 505 | 0.63 | +0.63 |
| Citizens Electoral Council | Steven Bird | 251 | 0.31 | +0.09 |
| Total formal votes | | 80,137 | 95.62 | +0.70 |
| Informal votes | | 3,667 | 4.38 | −0.70 |
| Turnout | | 83,804 | 95.03 | −1.11 |
Two-party-preferred result
| Labor | Gavan O'Connor | 44,588 | 55.64 | −2.87 |
| Liberal | Bruce King | 35,549 | 44.36 | +2.87 |
| Labor hold | | Swing | −2.87 | |

=== Deakin ===
2004 Australian federal election: Deakin
| Party | Candidate | Votes | % | ±% |
|---|---|---|---|---|
| Liberal | Phil Barresi | 40,922 | 50.59 | +3.52 |
| Labor | Peter Lynch | 29,240 | 36.15 | −2.40 |
| Greens | Bill Pemberton | 6,359 | 7.86 | +1.56 |
| Family First | Yasmin de Zilwa | 1,889 | 2.34 | +2.34 |
| Democrats | Alan Bailey | 1,595 | 1.97 | −5.98 |
| Independent | Steve Raskovy | 739 | 0.91 | +0.91 |
| Citizens Electoral Council | Simon Tait | 140 | 0.17 | +0.14 |
| Total formal votes | | 80,884 | 96.94 | −0.48 |
| Informal votes | | 2,554 | 3.06 | +0.48 |
| Turnout | | 83,438 | 95.43 | −0.05 |
Two-party-preferred result
| Liberal | Phil Barresi | 44,462 | 54.97 | +3.37 |
| Labor | Peter Lynch | 36,422 | 45.03 | −3.37 |
| Liberal hold | | Swing | +3.37 | |

=== Dunkley ===
2004 Australian federal election: Dunkley
| Party | Candidate | Votes | % | ±% |
|---|---|---|---|---|
| Liberal | Bruce Billson | 46,067 | 55.54 | +5.81 |
| Labor | Helen Constas | 27,845 | 33.57 | −2.38 |
| Greens | Paula Johnson | 5,179 | 6.24 | +0.62 |
| Family First | Cameron Eastman | 1,949 | 2.35 | +2.35 |
| Democrats | Karen Bailey | 1,008 | 1.22 | −4.31 |
| Independent | Fletcher Davis | 722 | 0.87 | −0.32 |
| Citizens Electoral Council | Gabrielle M Peut | 178 | 0.21 | +0.20 |
| Total formal votes | | 82,948 | 96.09 | −0.43 |
| Informal votes | | 3,376 | 3.91 | +0.43 |
| Turnout | | 86,324 | 95.08 | −0.52 |
Two-party-preferred result
| Liberal | Bruce Billson | 49,253 | 59.38 | +4.16 |
| Labor | Helen Constas | 33,695 | 40.62 | −4.16 |
| Liberal hold | | Swing | +4.16 | |

=== Flinders ===
2004 Australian federal election: Flinders
| Party | Candidate | Votes | % | ±% |
|---|---|---|---|---|
| Liberal | Greg Hunt | 48,249 | 58.17 | +6.65 |
| Labor | Simon Napthine | 25,621 | 30.89 | −2.05 |
| Greens | Stuart Kingsford | 5,204 | 6.27 | +0.39 |
| Family First | Dean Johnstone | 1,435 | 1.73 | +1.73 |
| Independent | Paul Madigan | 1,043 | 1.26 | +1.26 |
| Democrats | Bruce Errol | 715 | 0.86 | −4.74 |
| Independent | Neale Adams | 503 | 0.61 | +0.61 |
| Citizens Electoral Council | Henry Broadbent | 174 | 0.21 | +0.21 |
| Total formal votes | | 82,944 | 95.66 | −0.56 |
| Informal votes | | 3,765 | 4.34 | +0.56 |
| Turnout | | 86,709 | 95.30 | −0.32 |
Two-party-preferred result
| Liberal | Greg Hunt | 50,689 | 61.11 | +3.67 |
| Labor | Simon Napthine | 32,255 | 38.89 | −3.67 |
| Liberal hold | | Swing | +3.67 | |

=== Gellibrand ===
2004 Australian federal election: Gellibrand
| Party | Candidate | Votes | % | ±% |
|---|---|---|---|---|
| Labor | Nicola Roxon | 43,383 | 54.62 | −4.78 |
| Liberal | David McConnell | 25,069 | 31.57 | +5.38 |
| Greens | Nam Bui | 7,210 | 9.08 | +2.78 |
| Family First | Michael Lee | 1,463 | 1.84 | +1.84 |
| Democrats | Max Grarock | 1,032 | 1.30 | −5.91 |
| Independent | Wajde Assaf | 606 | 0.76 | +0.76 |
| Socialist Alliance | Linda Waldron | 508 | 0.64 | +0.64 |
| Citizens Electoral Council | Kel Isherwood | 149 | 0.19 | +0.19 |
| Total formal votes | | 79,420 | 93.43 | −1.90 |
| Informal votes | | 5,587 | 6.57 | +1.90 |
| Turnout | | 85,007 | 93.40 | −0.47 |
Two-party-preferred result
| Labor | Nicola Roxon | 51,587 | 64.95 | −5.46 |
| Liberal | David McConnell | 27,833 | 35.05 | +5.46 |
| Labor hold | | Swing | −5.46 | |

=== Gippsland ===
2004 Australian federal election: Gippsland
| Party | Candidate | Votes | % | ±% |
|---|---|---|---|---|
| National | Peter McGauran | 41,531 | 48.73 | +19.00 |
| Labor | Don Wishart | 29,053 | 34.09 | +0.23 |
| Greens | Madelon Lane | 3,734 | 4.38 | +0.46 |
| Independent | Peter Maxwell Kelly | 3,139 | 3.68 | +3.68 |
| One Nation | Ben Buckley | 2,539 | 2.98 | −1.96 |
| Family First | Doug Lillyman | 2,405 | 2.82 | +2.82 |
| Democrats | David Leonard Langmore | 1,312 | 1.54 | −2.95 |
| | Christina Sindt | 1,288 | 1.51 | +1.51 |
| Citizens Electoral Council | Heather Stanton | 233 | 0.27 | +0.06 |
| Total formal votes | | 85,234 | 95.77 | +0.53 |
| Informal votes | | 3,763 | 4.23 | −0.53 |
| Turnout | | 88,997 | 95.63 | +0.00 |
Two-party-preferred result
| National | Peter McGauran | 49,181 | 57.70 | +5.12 |
| Labor | Don Wishart | 36,053 | 42.30 | −5.12 |
| National hold | | Swing | +5.12 | |

=== Goldstein ===
2004 Australian federal election: Goldstein
| Party | Candidate | Votes | % | ±% |
|---|---|---|---|---|
| Liberal | Andrew Robb | 45,829 | 55.98 | +3.25 |
| Labor | Craig Tucker | 24,941 | 30.46 | +2.95 |
| Greens | Bill Clair | 7,251 | 8.86 | +2.45 |
| Independent | Terry O'Brien | 1,585 | 1.94 | +1.94 |
| Family First | Mark Hermans | 1,088 | 1.33 | +1.33 |
| Democrats | Aron Paul Igai | 1,006 | 1.23 | −6.30 |
| Citizens Electoral Council | Heather E Shomali | 168 | 0.21 | +0.21 |
| Total formal votes | | 81,858 | 96.60 | −0.63 |
| Informal votes | | 2,880 | 3.40 | +0.63 |
| Turnout | | 84,748 | 94.60 | +0.16 |
Two-party-preferred result
| Liberal | Andrew Robb | 49,147 | 60.03 | +0.53 |
| Labor | Craig Tucker | 32,721 | 39.97 | −0.53 |
| Liberal hold | | Swing | +0.53 | |

=== Gorton ===
2004 Australian federal election: Gorton
| Party | Candidate | Votes | % | ±% |
|---|---|---|---|---|
| Labor | Brendan O'Connor | 48,930 | 59.37 | +0.07 |
| Liberal | Susan Jennison | 26,717 | 32.42 | +8.39 |
| Greens | Steven Wilson | 4,204 | 5.10 | +2.04 |
| Family First | Ian Mallon | 2,052 | 2.49 | +2.49 |
| Citizens Electoral Council | Colin Ross Morgan Campbell | 510 | 0.62 | −0.26 |
| Total formal votes | | 82,413 | 94.94 | +0.90 |
| Informal votes | | 4,396 | 5.06 | −0.90 |
| Turnout | | 86,809 | 94.04 | −0.11 |
Two-party-preferred result
| Labor | Brendan O'Connor | 53,486 | 64.90 | −5.07 |
| Liberal | Susan Jennison | 28,927 | 35.10 | +5.07 |
| Labor notional hold | | Swing | −5.07 | |

=== Higgins ===
2004 Australian federal election: Higgins
| Party | Candidate | Votes | % | ±% |
|---|---|---|---|---|
| Liberal | Peter Costello | 43,739 | 55.20 | +2.01 |
| Labor | Paul Klisaris | 24,166 | 30.50 | +1.62 |
| Greens | Robert Trafficante | 8,993 | 11.35 | +2.54 |
| Democrats | Adam McBeth | 1,440 | 1.82 | −7.30 |
| Family First | Glen Pringle | 658 | 0.83 | +0.83 |
| Citizens Electoral Council | Katherine Reid | 243 | 0.31 | +0.31 |
| Total formal votes | | 79,239 | 97.24 | −0.08 |
| Informal votes | | 2,247 | 2.76 | +0.08 |
| Turnout | | 81,486 | 92.97 | −1.11 |
Two-party-preferred result
| Liberal | Peter Costello | 46,561 | 58.76 | +0.37 |
| Labor | Paul Klisaris | 32,678 | 41.24 | −0.37 |
| Liberal hold | | Swing | +0.37 | |

=== Holt ===
2004 Australian federal election: Holt
| Party | Candidate | Votes | % | ±% |
|---|---|---|---|---|
| Labor | Anthony Byrne | 37,269 | 45.67 | −4.29 |
| Liberal | Paul Teiwes | 34,974 | 42.85 | +6.72 |
| Greens | Jim Reiher | 3,638 | 4.46 | +1.74 |
| Family First | Stephen Burgess | 3,403 | 4.17 | +4.17 |
| Citizens Electoral Council | Jason John | 1,169 | 1.43 | +1.34 |
| Democrats | Daniel Berk | 1,160 | 1.42 | −5.69 |
| Total formal votes | | 81,613 | 95.65 | +0.40 |
| Informal votes | | 3,710 | 4.35 | −0.40 |
| Turnout | | 85,323 | 95.05 | +0.95 |
Two-party-preferred result
| Labor | Anthony Byrne | 42,036 | 51.51 | −6.40 |
| Liberal | Paul Teiwes | 39,577 | 48.49 | +6.40 |
| Labor hold | | Swing | −6.40 | |

=== Hotham ===
2004 Australian federal election: Hotham
| Party | Candidate | Votes | % | ±% |
|---|---|---|---|---|
| Labor | Simon Crean | 40,735 | 51.22 | −3.19 |
| Liberal | Jennifer Marriner | 30,992 | 38.97 | +3.87 |
| Greens | Kiera Perrott | 4,287 | 5.39 | +1.04 |
| Family First | Roger Coombe | 2,045 | 2.57 | +2.57 |
| Democrats | Jessica Joss | 975 | 1.23 | −4.16 |
| Socialist Alliance | Josephine Cox | 274 | 0.34 | +0.34 |
| Citizens Electoral Council | Adam Ellery | 224 | 0.28 | −0.45 |
| Total formal votes | | 79,532 | 95.76 | −0.68 |
| Informal votes | | 3,525 | 4.24 | +0.68 |
| Turnout | | 83,057 | 94.55 | −0.27 |
Two-party-preferred result
| Labor | Simon Crean | 45,655 | 57.40 | −3.59 |
| Liberal | Jennifer Marriner | 33,877 | 42.60 | +3.59 |
| Labor hold | | Swing | −3.59 | |

=== Indi ===
2004 Australian federal election: Indi
| Party | Candidate | Votes | % | ±% |
|---|---|---|---|---|
| Liberal | Sophie Panopoulos | 51,834 | 62.63 | +21.55 |
| Labor | John Williams | 21,710 | 26.23 | −1.28 |
| Greens | Jenny O'Connor | 5,321 | 6.43 | +2.47 |
| Family First | Warren McMartin | 3,341 | 4.04 | +4.04 |
| Citizens Electoral Council | Merrill Christine Bailey | 558 | 0.67 | +0.67 |
| Total formal votes | | 82,764 | 97.12 | +2.24 |
| Informal votes | | 2,454 | 2.88 | −2.24 |
| Turnout | | 85,218 | 95.37 | +0.01 |
Two-party-preferred result
| Liberal | Sophie Panopoulos | 54,863 | 66.29 | +5.59 |
| Labor | John Williams | 27,901 | 33.71 | −5.59 |
| Liberal hold | | Swing | +5.59 | |

=== Isaacs ===
2004 Australian federal election: Isaacs
| Party | Candidate | Votes | % | ±% |
|---|---|---|---|---|
| Labor | Ann Corcoran | 37,245 | 44.31 | −2.93 |
| Liberal | Jeff Shelley | 36,391 | 43.29 | +5.23 |
| Greens | Sean Hardy | 6,143 | 7.31 | +3.35 |
| Family First | Jacob Mathews | 2,019 | 2.40 | +2.40 |
| Democrats | Haydn Fletcher | 862 | 1.03 | −6.05 |
| Independent | Gordon Ford | 650 | 0.77 | +0.77 |
| One Nation | Carl Groves | 536 | 0.64 | −0.55 |
| Citizens Electoral Council | Martha Malliotis | 214 | 0.25 | +0.04 |
| Total formal votes | | 84,060 | 94.96 | −0.37 |
| Informal votes | | 4,464 | 5.04 | +0.37 |
| Turnout | | 88,524 | 95.25 | +0.11 |
Two-party-preferred result
| Labor | Ann Corcoran | 43,277 | 51.48 | −5.14 |
| Liberal | Jeff Shelley | 40,783 | 48.52 | +5.14 |
| Labor hold | | Swing | −5.14 | |

=== Jagajaga ===
2004 Australian federal election: Jagajaga
| Party | Candidate | Votes | % | ±% |
|---|---|---|---|---|
| Labor | Jenny Macklin | 38,303 | 44.78 | −0.34 |
| Liberal | Woody Inman | 36,210 | 42.33 | +1.86 |
| Greens | Don Ardin | 7,111 | 8.31 | +1.74 |
| Family First | Jennifer Barton | 1,956 | 2.29 | +2.29 |
| Democrats | Cate Hayward | 983 | 1.15 | −5.53 |
| Veterans | Barry Minster | 527 | 0.62 | +0.62 |
| Pensioners | Gary Schorel-Hlavka | 285 | 0.33 | +0.33 |
| Citizens Electoral Council | Stephen Lele | 162 | 0.19 | −0.16 |
| Total formal votes | | 85,537 | 96.02 | −0.34 |
| Informal votes | | 3,549 | 3.98 | +0.34 |
| Turnout | | 89,086 | 95.49 | −0.29 |
Two-party-preferred result
| Labor | Jenny Macklin | 46,531 | 54.40 | −0.88 |
| Liberal | Woody Inman | 39,006 | 45.60 | +0.88 |
| Labor hold | | Swing | −0.88 | |

=== Kooyong ===
2004 Australian federal election: Kooyong
| Party | Candidate | Votes | % | ±% |
|---|---|---|---|---|
| Liberal | Petro Georgiou | 43,581 | 54.66 | −0.42 |
| Labor | Tom Wilson | 23,132 | 29.01 | +2.75 |
| Greens | Peter Campbell | 9,997 | 12.54 | +1.82 |
| Democrats | Mary Dettman | 1,472 | 1.85 | −6.09 |
| Family First | John Laidler | 1,099 | 1.38 | +1.38 |
| Citizens Electoral Council | Andrew Reed | 446 | 0.56 | +0.56 |
| Total formal votes | | 79,727 | 97.10 | −0.33 |
| Informal votes | | 2,380 | 2.90 | +0.33 |
| Turnout | | 82,107 | 94.26 | −1.26 |
Two-party-preferred result
| Liberal | Petro Georgiou | 47,498 | 59.58 | −1.36 |
| Labor | Tom Wilson | 32,229 | 40.42 | +1.36 |
| Liberal hold | | Swing | −1.36 | |

=== La Trobe ===
2004 Australian federal election: La Trobe
| Party | Candidate | Votes | % | ±% |
|---|---|---|---|---|
| Liberal | Jason Wood | 39,810 | 51.22 | +4.68 |
| Labor | Susan Davies | 26,251 | 33.77 | −0.45 |
| Greens | Craig Smith | 7,313 | 9.41 | +2.01 |
| Democrats | Tony Holland | 1,160 | 1.49 | −6.53 |
| Family First | Darryl Bridges | 1,830 | 2.35 | +2.35 |
| Independent | Frank Dean | 777 | 1.00 | +0.52 |
| Christian Democrats | Wolf Voigt | 459 | 0.59 | −0.45 |
| Citizens Electoral Council | Kurt Beilharz | 131 | 0.17 | +0.17 |
| Total formal votes | | 77,731 | 95.98 | +0.20 |
| Informal votes | | 3,254 | 4.02 | −0.20 |
| Turnout | | 80,985 | 95.46 | +0.59 |
Two-party-preferred result
| Liberal | Jason Wood | 43,394 | 55.83 | +2.16 |
| Labor | Susan Davies | 34,337 | 44.17 | −2.16 |
| Liberal hold | | Swing | +2.16 | |

=== Lalor ===
2004 Australian federal election: Lalor
| Party | Candidate | Votes | % | ±% |
|---|---|---|---|---|
| Labor | Julia Gillard | 43,677 | 53.25 | −1.48 |
| Liberal | Peter Curtis | 30,715 | 37.45 | +4.40 |
| Greens | Malcolm Browning | 3,381 | 4.12 | −0.49 |
| Family First | Arthur Buller | 2,607 | 3.18 | +3.18 |
| Democrats | Roger Howe | 1,182 | 1.44 | −5.99 |
| Citizens Electoral Council | Sally Larner | 462 | 0.56 | +0.56 |
| Total formal votes | | 82,024 | 95.15 | −0.77 |
| Informal votes | | 4,184 | 4.85 | +0.77 |
| Turnout | | 86,208 | 95.44 | +0.42 |
Two-party-preferred result
| Labor | Julia Gillard | 48,218 | 58.79 | −3.27 |
| Liberal | Peter Curtis | 33,806 | 41.21 | +3.27 |
| Labor hold | | Swing | −3.27 | |

=== Mallee ===
2004 Australian federal election: Mallee
| Party | Candidate | Votes | % | ±% |
|---|---|---|---|---|
| National | John Forrest | 57,370 | 68.42 | +15.22 |
| Labor | John Zigouras | 17,034 | 20.31 | +0.35 |
| Family First | Kevin Smith | 3,787 | 4.52 | +4.52 |
| Greens | Simon Roberts | 3,166 | 3.78 | +1.47 |
| Democrats | Stephen Parr | 1,301 | 1.55 | −2.84 |
| Citizens Electoral Council | Trudy Campbell | 1,197 | 1.43 | +1.43 |
| Total formal votes | | 83,855 | 96.51 | +0.08 |
| Informal votes | | 3,031 | 3.49 | −0.08 |
| Turnout | | 86,886 | 95.82 | −0.51 |
Two-party-preferred result
| National | John Forrest | 62,680 | 74.75 | +3.89 |
| Labor | John Zigouras | 21,175 | 25.25 | −3.89 |
| National hold | | Swing | +3.89 | |

=== Maribyrnong ===
2004 Australian federal election: Maribyrnong
| Party | Candidate | Votes | % | ±% |
|---|---|---|---|---|
| Labor | Bob Sercombe | 40,075 | 51.33 | −5.38 |
| Liberal | Conrad D'Souza | 29,281 | 37.50 | +7.51 |
| Greens | Bob Muntz | 5,358 | 6.86 | +2.17 |
| Family First | David Holt | 1,443 | 1.85 | +1.85 |
| Democrats | Robert Livesay | 1,261 | 1.62 | −4.90 |
| Citizens Electoral Council | Andre Kozlowski | 656 | 0.84 | −0.94 |
| Total formal votes | | 78,074 | 95.14 | +0.18 |
| Informal votes | | 3,989 | 4.86 | −0.18 |
| Turnout | | 82,063 | 94.04 | −0.42 |
Two-party-preferred result
| Labor | Bob Sercombe | 46,431 | 59.47 | −5.96 |
| Liberal | Conrad D'Souza | 31,643 | 40.53 | +5.96 |
| Labor hold | | Swing | −5.96 | |

=== McEwen ===
2004 Australian federal election: McEwen
| Party | Candidate | Votes | % | ±% |
|---|---|---|---|---|
| Liberal | Fran Bailey | 45,230 | 51.74 | +5.18 |
| Labor | Jenny Beales | 30,205 | 34.55 | −2.81 |
| Greens | Megan Hannes-Paterson | 6,686 | 7.65 | +0.41 |
| Independent | Robert Gordon | 2,220 | 2.54 | +2.54 |
| Family First | Mark Sach | 1,500 | 1.72 | +1.72 |
| Democrats | Marj White | 713 | 0.82 | −4.64 |
| Independent | Damon Gordon Lutz | 398 | 0.46 | +0.46 |
| Independent | Maurie Smith | 278 | 0.32 | +0.32 |
| Citizens Electoral Council | Rod McLennan | 188 | 0.22 | +0.22 |
| Total formal votes | | 87,418 | 95.34 | −1.08 |
| Informal votes | | 4,273 | 4.66 | +1.08 |
| Turnout | | 91,691 | 96.11 | +0.34 |
Two-party-preferred result
| Liberal | Fran Bailey | 49,322 | 56.42 | +4.10 |
| Labor | Jenny Beales | 38,096 | 43.58 | −4.10 |
| Liberal hold | | Swing | +4.10 | |

=== McMillan ===
2004 Australian federal election: McMillan
| Party | Candidate | Votes | % | ±% |
|---|---|---|---|---|
| Liberal | Russell Broadbent | 32,379 | 42.93 | +13.80 |
| Labor | Christian Zahra | 28,555 | 37.86 | +0.94 |
| National | Bridget McKenzie | 6,676 | 8.85 | −7.74 |
| Greens | Chris Aitken | 3,381 | 4.48 | −0.89 |
| Family First | Harold Paul | 1,289 | 1.71 | +1.71 |
| Independent | Howard Emanuel | 1,079 | 1.43 | +1.43 |
| One Nation | A R Gizycki de Gozdawa | 1,044 | 1.38 | −2.55 |
| Democrats | Julie Grant | 638 | 0.85 | −3.10 |
| Democratic Labor | Greg Byrne | 263 | 0.35 | +0.35 |
| Citizens Electoral Council | Graeme Reid | 127 | 0.17 | +0.10 |
| Total formal votes | | 75,431 | 95.51 | −0.25 |
| Informal votes | | 3,543 | 4.49 | +0.25 |
| Turnout | | 78,974 | 95.89 | −0.17 |
Two-party-preferred result
| Liberal | Russell Broadbent | 41,477 | 54.99 | +2.15 |
| Labor | Christian Zahra | 33,954 | 45.01 | −2.15 |
| Liberal notional hold | | Swing | +2.15 | |

The sitting member was Christian Zahra (Labor) however a redistribution made it a notional Liberal seat with a margin of 2.9%.

=== Melbourne ===
2004 Australian federal election: Melbourne
| Party | Candidate | Votes | % | ±% |
|---|---|---|---|---|
| Labor | Lindsay Tanner | 42,047 | 51.78 | +4.35 |
| Liberal | Jerry Dimitroulis | 20,374 | 25.09 | +0.05 |
| Greens | Gemma Pinnell | 15,416 | 18.98 | +3.21 |
| Democrats | Angela Williams | 1,326 | 1.63 | −8.01 |
| Family First | Chris Willis | 718 | 0.88 | +0.88 |
| Socialist Alliance | Zoe Kenny | 619 | 0.76 | +0.76 |
| Independent | Steven Anger | 559 | 0.69 | +0.69 |
| Citizens Electoral Council | Rhys McGuckin | 145 | 0.18 | +0.17 |
| Total formal votes | | 81,204 | 96.73 | +0.45 |
| Informal votes | | 2,741 | 3.27 | −0.45 |
| Turnout | | 83,945 | 91.07 | +0.55 |
Two-party-preferred result
| Labor | Lindsay Tanner | 57,766 | 71.14 | +1.26 |
| Liberal | Jerry Dimitroulis | 23,438 | 28.86 | −1.26 |
| Labor hold | | Swing | +1.26 | |

=== Melbourne Ports ===
2004 Australian federal election: Melbourne Ports
| Party | Candidate | Votes | % | ±% |
|---|---|---|---|---|
| Liberal | David Southwick | 35,058 | 42.94 | +3.23 |
| Labor | Michael Danby | 32,046 | 39.25 | −0.11 |
| Greens | Jo Lewis | 11,508 | 14.10 | +2.82 |
| Democrats | Craig Beale | 1,102 | 1.35 | −7.92 |
| Independent | Les Cameron | 958 | 1.17 | +1.17 |
| Family First | Graeme Jackel | 444 | 0.54 | +0.54 |
| Independent | Leonie Horin | 374 | 0.46 | +0.46 |
| Citizens Electoral Council | Aaron Isherwood | 146 | 0.18 | −0.21 |
| Total formal votes | | 81,636 | 96.60 | −0.14 |
| Informal votes | | 2,875 | 3.40 | +0.14 |
| Turnout | | 84,511 | 91.13 | −1.79 |
Two-party-preferred result
| Labor | Michael Danby | 43,873 | 53.74 | −1.95 |
| Liberal | David Southwick | 37,763 | 46.26 | +1.95 |
| Labor hold | | Swing | −1.95 | |

=== Menzies ===
2004 Australian federal election: Menzies
| Party | Candidate | Votes | % | ±% |
|---|---|---|---|---|
| Liberal | Kevin Andrews | 46,132 | 56.79 | +3.46 |
| Labor | Brian Jones | 26,635 | 32.79 | −0.41 |
| Greens | Matthew Wright | 5,251 | 6.46 | +0.97 |
| Family First | John Bridge | 1,739 | 2.14 | +2.14 |
| Democrats | Anne Page | 1,226 | 1.51 | −5.09 |
| Citizens Electoral Council | Jordon Davidson | 256 | 0.32 | +0.32 |
| Total formal votes | | 81,239 | 96.39 | −0.22 |
| Informal votes | | 3,039 | 3.61 | +0.22 |
| Turnout | | 84,278 | 95.44 | −0.37 |
Two-party-preferred result
| Liberal | Kevin Andrews | 49,288 | 60.67 | +1.76 |
| Labor | Brian Jones | 31,951 | 39.33 | −1.76 |
| Liberal hold | | Swing | +1.76 | |

=== Murray ===
2004 Australian federal election: Murray
| Party | Candidate | Votes | % | ±% |
|---|---|---|---|---|
| Liberal | Sharman Stone | 52,697 | 65.53 | +1.49 |
| Labor | Norm Kelly | 15,899 | 19.77 | −2.04 |
| Independent | Rob Bryant | 6,235 | 7.75 | +7.75 |
| Greens | Monica Morgan | 2,449 | 3.05 | +0.64 |
| Family First | Janine Madill | 1,917 | 2.38 | +2.38 |
| Independent | Diane Teasdale | 1,083 | 1.35 | +1.35 |
| Citizens Electoral Council | Elisa Barwick | 137 | 0.17 | +0.17 |
| Total formal votes | | 80,417 | 95.82 | −0.47 |
| Informal votes | | 3,504 | 4.18 | +0.47 |
| Turnout | | 83,921 | 95.77 | −0.84 |
Two-party-preferred result
| Liberal | Sharman Stone | 59,574 | 74.08 | +2.14 |
| Labor | Norm Kelly | 20,843 | 25.92 | −2.14 |
| Liberal hold | | Swing | +2.14 | |

=== Scullin ===
2004 Australian federal election: Scullin
| Party | Candidate | Votes | % | ±% |
|---|---|---|---|---|
| Labor | Harry Jenkins | 46,209 | 59.02 | −5.27 |
| Liberal | Lucas Kostadinoski | 24,196 | 30.91 | +5.21 |
| Greens | Merinda Gray | 3,941 | 5.03 | +2.23 |
| Family First | Amy Shand | 2,656 | 3.39 | +3.39 |
| Citizens Electoral Council | Simon Steer | 1,287 | 1.64 | +0.92 |
| Total formal votes | | 78,289 | 95.25 | +0.20 |
| Informal votes | | 3,905 | 4.75 | −0.20 |
| Turnout | | 82,194 | 95.57 | −0.26 |
Two-party-preferred result
| Labor | Harry Jenkins | 50,726 | 64.79 | −5.45 |
| Liberal | Lucas Kostadinoski | 27,563 | 35.21 | +5.45 |
| Labor hold | | Swing | −5.45 | |

=== Wannon ===
2004 Australian federal election: Wannon
| Party | Candidate | Votes | % | ±% |
|---|---|---|---|---|
| Liberal | David Hawker | 48,687 | 57.83 | +5.61 |
| Labor | Robert John McAlpine | 26,816 | 31.85 | −1.85 |
| Greens | Gillian Blair | 3,663 | 4.35 | +0.66 |
| Family First | Ruth Hazelton | 2,508 | 2.98 | +2.98 |
| Independent | Leigh McDonald | 1,555 | 1.85 | −0.20 |
| Democrats | Kerre Willsher | 806 | 0.96 | −2.02 |
| Citizens Electoral Council | Robert Barwick | 149 | 0.18 | +0.18 |
| Total formal votes | | 84,184 | 96.62 | +0.36 |
| Informal votes | | 2,944 | 3.38 | −0.36 |
| Turnout | | 87,128 | 95.95 | −0.55 |
Two-party-preferred result
| Liberal | David Hawker | 52,504 | 62.37 | +3.14 |
| Labor | Robert John McAlpine | 31,680 | 37.63 | −3.14 |
| Liberal hold | | Swing | +3.14 | |

=== Wills ===
2004 Australian federal election: Wills
| Party | Candidate | Votes | % | ±% |
|---|---|---|---|---|
| Labor | Kelvin Thomson | 44,158 | 53.82 | −2.22 |
| Liberal | Blair Hamilton | 23,549 | 28.70 | +3.23 |
| Greens | Toby Archer | 10,663 | 13.00 | +4.72 |
| Family First | Deborah Suraci | 1,275 | 1.55 | +1.55 |
| Democrats | Robert Stone | 1,163 | 1.42 | −4.81 |
| Socialist Alliance | David Glanz | 867 | 1.06 | +1.06 |
| Citizens Electoral Council | Noelene Isherwood | 373 | 0.45 | −1.04 |
| Total formal votes | | 82,048 | 94.50 | −0.15 |
| Informal votes | | 4,772 | 5.50 | +0.15 |
| Turnout | | 86,820 | 92.99 | −0.80 |
Two-party-preferred result
| Labor | Kelvin Thomson | 54,893 | 66.90 | −3.67 |
| Liberal | Blair Hamilton | 27,155 | 33.10 | +3.67 |
| Labor hold | | Swing | −3.67 | |

== See also ==
- Members of the Australian House of Representatives, 2004–2007
