= Division of Mallee =

Australian federal electoral division

Coordinates: 35.719°S 142.178°E

Mallee Australian House of Representatives Division
- Interactive map of electorate boundaries from the 2025 federal election
- Created: 1949
- MP: Anne Webster
- Party: The Nationals
- Namesake: The Mallee
- Electors: 121,662 (2025)
- Area: 83,412 km^{2} (32,205.6 sq mi)
- Demographic: Rural

The Division of Mallee is an Australian Electoral Division in the state of Victoria. It is located in the far north-west of the state, adjoining the border with South Australia in the west, and the Murray River (which forms the border with New South Wales) in the north. At 81,962 square kilometres (31,646 sq mi), it is the largest Division in Victoria. It includes the centres of Mildura, Ouyen, Swan Hill, St Arnaud, Warracknabeal, Stawell, Horsham and Maryborough.

== Geography ==
Since 1984, federal electoral division boundaries in Australia have been determined at redistributions by a redistribution committee appointed by the Australian Electoral Commission. Redistributions occur for the boundaries of divisions in a particular state, and they occur every seven years, or sooner if a state's representation entitlement changes or when divisions of a state are malapportioned.

Mallee is centred on the north west of Victoria, and since the 2022 federal election consists of the shires of Buloke, Central Goldfields, Gannawarra, Hindmarsh, Loddon, West Wimmera, Yarriambiack; the rural cities of Horsham, Mildura, and Swan Hill, as well portions of the shires of Northern Grampians and Pyrenees.

== History ==
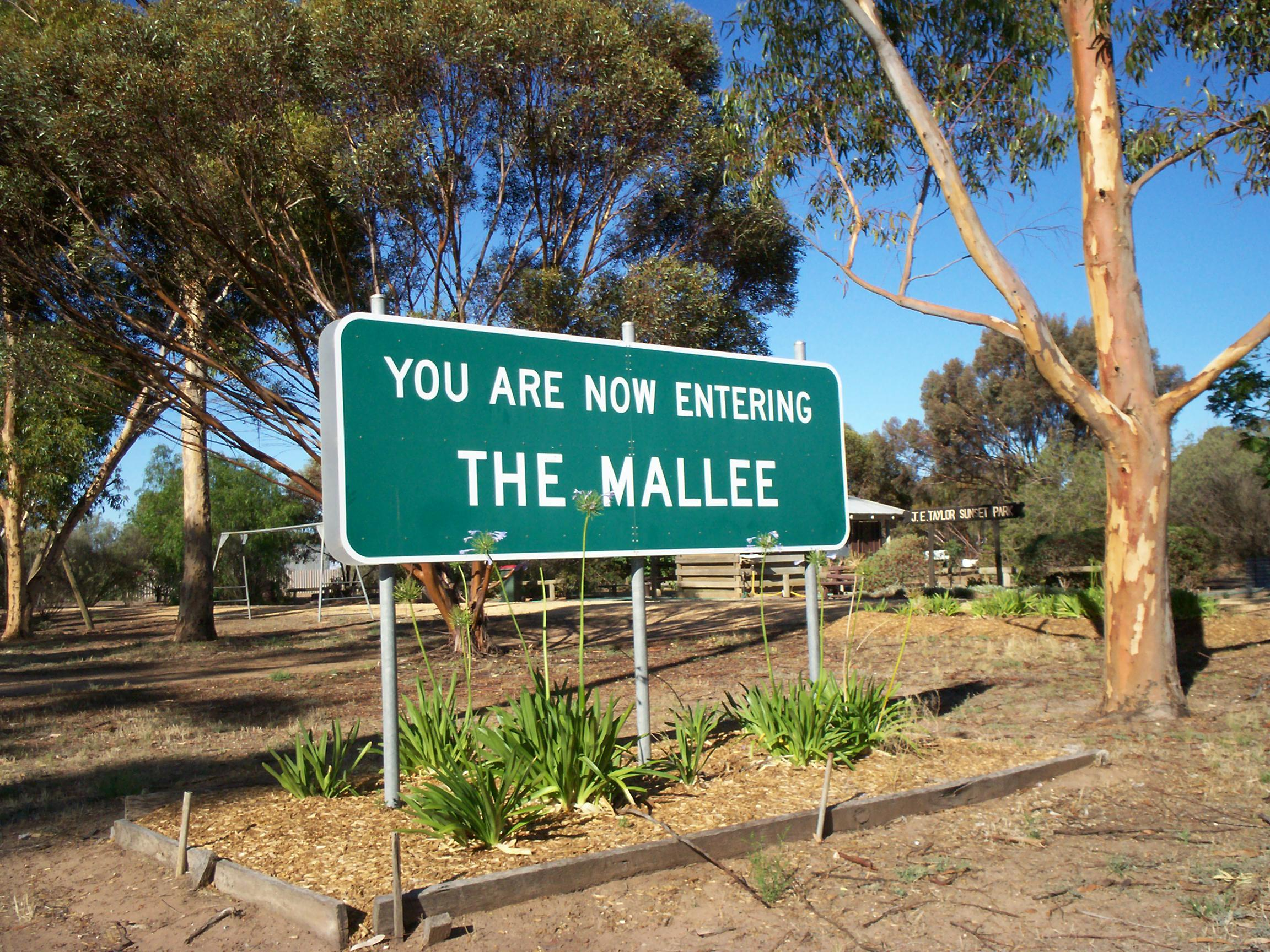
The Mallee, a region in Victoria from which the division takes its name

The division was proclaimed at the redistribution of 11 May 1949, and was first contested at the 1949 election. It was named after the Mallee region of Victoria, in which the division is located, which itself is named after the mallee variety of eucalyptus. Note that the division also includes the Wimmera region of Victoria, which is why the title of the sitting member's newsletter is Wimmera Mallee News.

Mallee has always been a safe Country/National seat. It was previously the safest Coalition seat in federal parliament and also previously the safest seat in the entire parliament in the 2010 election, with a 24-point swing required for Labor to have won it. In the 2013 and 2019 elections a Liberal Party candidate stood against the National Party, making it a contest between the Coalition parties.

== Members ==
Image	Member	Party	Term	Notes
	Sir Winton Turnbull (1899–1980)	Country	10 December 1949 – 2 November 1972	Previously held the Division of Wimmera. Retired
	Peter Fisher (1936–)	Country	2 December 1972 – 2 May 1975	Retired
	Peter Fisher (1936–)	National Country	2 May 1975 – 16 October 1982	Retired
	Peter Fisher (1936–)	Nationals	16 October 1982 – 8 February 1993	Retired
	John Forrest (1949–)	Nationals	13 March 1993 – 5 August 2013	Retired
	Andrew Broad (1975–)	Nationals	7 September 2013 – 11 April 2019	Retired
	Anne Webster (1959–)	Nationals	18 May 2019 – present	Incumbent

== Election results ==
2025 Australian federal election: Mallee
Party	Candidate	Votes	%	±%
National	Anne Webster	51,553	49.71	+0.62
Labor	Greg Olsen	19,839	19.13	+2.37
One Nation	Vaughan Williams	11,414	11.01	+4.26
Greens	Nicole Rowan	9,477	9.14	+3.80
Family First	Ashleigh Gray	3,960	3.82	+3.82
Trumpet of Patriots	Adam Veitch	3,810	3.67	+3.67
Libertarian	Jeff Barry	2,671	2.58	+2.58
Citizens	Chris Lahy	983	0.95	+0.15
Total formal votes		103,707	93.22	−1.14
Informal votes		7,540	6.78	+1.14
Turnout		111,247	91.48	+3.82
Two-party-preferred result
National	Anne Webster	71,597	69.04	+0.05
Labor	Greg Olsen	32,110	30.96	−0.05
National hold		Swing	+0.05	
