= Peter Fisher (politician) =

Australian politician (born 1936)

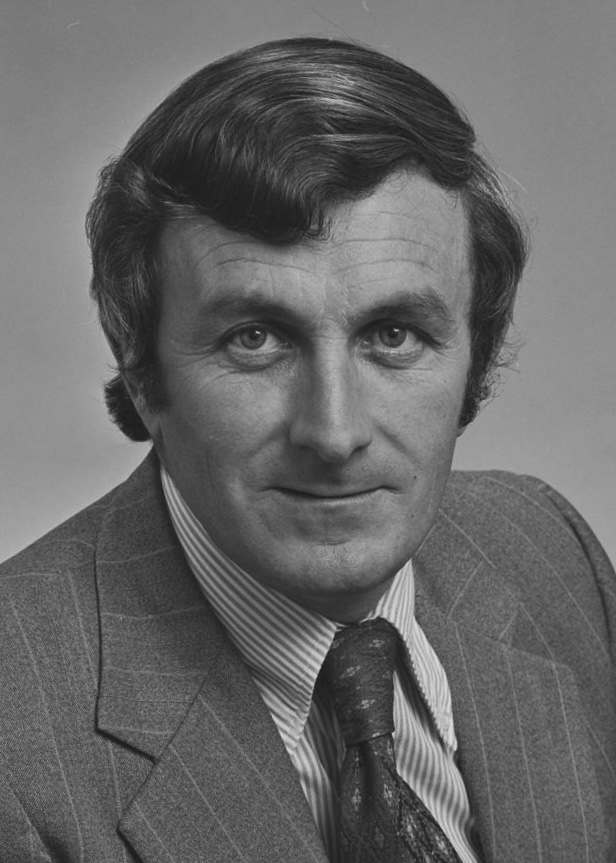

Member of the Australian Parliament for Mallee
- In office 2 December 1972 – 8 February 1993
- Preceded by: Winton Turnbull
- Succeeded by: John Forrest

Personal details
- Born: 19 September 1936 (age 89) Rainbow, Victoria
- Party: Australian Country Party
- Spouse: Judith Fisher (Cook)
- Children: 2 (Anthony Fisher, Nicole Bradshaw)
- Occupation: Farmer, Politician

Peter Stanley Fisher (born 19 September 1936) is a former Australian politician. Born in Rainbow, Victoria, he attended Longerenong Agricultural College before becoming a farmer. In 1972, he was elected to the Australian House of Representatives as the Country Party member for Mallee. During his parliamentary career, Fisher served as Deputy Whip (1976-1980), Chief Whip (1980-1983) and Shadow Minister for Sport and Recreation (1983-1984). Fisher held the seat until 1993 (by which time his party had become the National Party). In 1979, the first Qantas Boeing 747 aircraft equipped with Rolls-Royce engines (registration VH-ECB) was named the 'City of Swan Hill' after the riverside Mallee town as a result of Fisher's lobbying efforts.

After leaving Parliament, Fisher was appointed as Chief Commissioner of Horsham Rural City Council as part of the Kennett/MacNamara Government's restructuring of local government in Victoria. He also served as Trustee of Horsham Regional Art Gallery from 1998 to 2009, thereafter relocating to Buderim to retire closer to his family.

Parliament of Australia
Preceded by Winton Turnbull	Member for Mallee; 1972–1993	Succeeded by John Forrest
