= Anne Webster =

Australian politician (born 1959)

Anne Webster MP

Member of the Australian Parliament for Mallee
- Incumbent
- Assumed office 18 May 2019
- Preceded by: Andrew Broad

Personal details
- Born: Anne Elizabeth Smithers; 19 May 1959 (age 67) Strathfield, New South Wales, Australia
- Party: National
- Spouse: Philip Webster
- Education: La Trobe University; Australian National University
- Occupation: Social worker

Anne Elizabeth Webster (née Smithers; born 19 May 1959) is an Australian politician who has been a member of the House of Representatives since the 2019 federal election. She is a member of the National Party and represents the Division of Mallee in Victoria. She was a social worker and non-profit executive before entering parliament.

== Career ==
Webster studied sociology and history at La Trobe University, followed by a Bachelor of Social Work with honours. She also holds a diploma of Associate in Music, Australia. She taught music for a number of years, as well as worked as a professional seamstress and image consultant. In 2018, she completed a Ph.D. at the Australian National University (ANU) with a doctoral thesis on adoption titled "The Legacy, Legality and Legitimacy of Adopting Out - Examining the legitimacy of adoption through birth mother experiences".

Before entering parliament, Webster was a social worker in Mildura. She was elected to the board of the Mallee Accommodation and Support Program (MASP) in 2005, and served as chair for a period. In 2011, Webster became the founding executive director of Zoe Support, an organisation assisting young mothers with education. She was named "Citizen of the Year" by the Mildura Rural City Council in 2019 for her work with the organisation.

== Politics ==
In January 2019, Webster won National Party preselection for the Division of Mallee, replacing the retiring MP Andrew Broad. She defeated five other candidates over three rounds of voting. She had earlier stood for preselection in Mallee prior to the 2013 federal election, but lost to Broad.

Webster retained Mallee for the Nationals at the 2019 federal election with a small negative swing on the two-party-preferred count. The party's primary vote halved from 56 percent to 28 percent, with large swings to the Liberal Party, and independents Jason Modica and Ray Kingston.

After revelations emerged that Victorian Nationals leader Peter Walsh attempted to disaffiliate from the federal National Party to protest Barnaby Joyce's successful leadership challenge and opposition to a green net zero carbon emissions policy, Webster called for a balanced approach but expressed opposition to Walsh's support for the net zero policy.

== Personal life ==
In September 2020, Webster was awarded $350,000 in damages following a defamation suit against Karen Brewer, a conspiracy theorist who alleged on social media that Webster and her husband were "participants in a secretive criminal network involved in child sexual abuse". Her husband and the non-profit organisation they co-founded were awarded similar amounts.

Parliament of Australia
Preceded by Andrew Broad	Member for Mallee; 2019–present	Incumbent
