= Andrew Broad =

Australian politician (born 1975)

The Honourable Andrew Broad

Member of the Australian Parliament for Mallee
- In office 7 September 2013 – 11 April 2019
- Preceded by: John Forrest
- Succeeded by: Anne Webster

Personal details
- Born: 2 July 1975 (age 51) Carnarvon, Western Australia, Australia
- Party: National
- Spouse: Rachel Mellings
- Occupation: Farmer

Andrew John Broad (born 2 July 1975) is an Australian former politician who represented Mallee in the Australian House of Representatives from 2013 to 2019 as a member of The Nationals. He was Assistant Minister to the Deputy Prime Minister from September 2018 until December 2018. He did not run in the seat of Mallee at the federal election in May 2019. He is a board director, farmer and history content creator on YouTube.

== Career ==
Broad is a former president of the Victorian Farmers' Federation, Director of the National Farmers Federation and director of Australian Made. A small business owner, Broad operated his wheat and sheep farm for 16 years from the age of 22. In 2006, Broad completed a Nuffield Scholarship, travelling to over 40 countries to advance his knowledge of best practice canola production, exploring biotechnology, agronomic advances and new grower techniques.

Broad is a former chair of the House of Representatives Standing Committee on the Environment and Energy, and former co-chair of the Parliamentary Friends of UNICEF, and member of the Parliamentarians Against Family Violence group. Broad is also a former member of the Coalition Backbench Committee on Agriculture and the Coalition Backbench Committee on Trade and Investment.

Broad's political interests included small business measures, domestic gas reservation policy, water policy, primary producer tax concessions, school chaplaincy, domestic violence, illicit drug abuse, greater support for children with type 1 diabetes, drought policy and increases in foreign aid.

In the 2024 Queensland local government elections he ran for Division 7 on the Fraser Coast Regional Council, but was unsuccessful. Since leaving parliament Broad has managed his farming business producing lambs and cereal grains. His lambs are often amount the lead pens presented at the Bendigo Livestock Exchange. Broad is a director of the Hervey Bay Bendigo Bank, a community bank that gives the profits back to local community groups.

Andrew Broad has a YouTube channel: AussieGuyTravelling www.youtube.com/@andrewbroad3701 where Broad uses historic sites from around the world to explain impacts now. His content has been used by school groups to assist in their history and social science curriculum. Broad was a graduate of the 2026 International Summer Academy Auschwitz Birkenau Memorial Museum in Poland.

== Resignation and retirement ==
In December 2018, New Idea reported that Broad had used a "seeking arrangements" website to meet a younger woman. In response to the report, Broad stated that the woman making the allegations "may have engaged in criminal activity", and that he had referred the matter to the Australian Federal Police. Broad resigned from the ministry on 17 December 2018 as a result of the scandal. Subsequently, Deputy Prime Minister Michael McCormack revealed that he was aware of the allegations two weeks prior to them being published.

In a statement released on 17 December, the Australian Federal Police said that it had received and "assessed the information provided" by Broad, but that "no applicable offences under Australian law have been identified as any offence was outside Australia's jurisdiction". In addition, the agency stated that it had received the referral from Broad on 8 November. Broad reimbursed the costs of two flights between Mildura and Melbourne, charged to his Parliamentary account, for when he flew to Hong Kong, and did not recontest the seat of Mallee at the 2019 election.

In March 2019, Broad gave his final speech in the parliament outlining his achievements, and stating his desire to spend more time with his wife and daughter. He said he had made a "dumb mistake" in using the website and that politics had "made him not as nice a person".

Parliament of Australia
| Preceded by John Forrest | Member for Mallee; 2013–2019 | Succeeded by Anne Webster |
