= John Forrest (Victorian politician) =

Australian politician (born 1949)

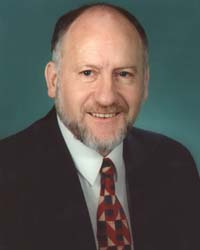

Member of the Australian Parliament for Mallee
- In office 13 March 1993 – 5 August 2013
- Preceded by: Peter Fisher
- Succeeded by: Andrew Broad

Personal details
- Born: 24 August 1949 (age 77) Mildura, Victoria
- Party: National Party of Australia
- Education: University of Melbourne; University of Aberdeen
- Occupation: Design engineer

John Alexander Forrest (born 24 August 1949) is a former Australian politician who served as a National Party member of the Australian House of Representatives from March 1993 until August 2013, representing the Division of Mallee in Victoria. He was born in Mildura, and was educated at University of Melbourne and the University of Aberdeen in Scotland. Before entering politics he was a design engineer with the State Electricity Commission of Victoria, a lecturer at Ballarat College of Advanced Education, and a member of the Rural City of Swan Hill council.

Forrest was one of the initial members of the Lyons Forum, a conservative parliamentary ginger group.

Forrest announced his retirement on 6 March 2013, stating that he would not contest the 2013 federal election.

Parliament of Australia
Preceded by Peter Fisher	Member for Mallee; 1993–2013	Succeeded by Andrew Broad
