= Electoral results for the Division of Isaacs =

Australian division election results

This is a list of electoral results for the Division of Isaacs in Australian federal elections from the division's creation in 1969 until the present.

== Members ==
Member	Party	Term
David Hamer	Liberal	1969–1974
Gareth Clayton	Labor	1974–1975
David Hamer	Liberal	1975–1977
Bill Burns	Liberal	1977–1980
David Charles	Labor	1980–1990
Rod Atkinson	Liberal	1990–1996
Greg Wilton	Labor	1996–2000
Ann Corcoran	Labor	2000 by–2007
Mark Dreyfus	Labor	2007–present

== Election results ==
=== Elections in the 2020s ===
==== 2025 ====
2025 Australian federal election: Isaacs
Party	Candidate	Votes	%	±%
Labor	Mark Dreyfus			
Greens	Matthew Kirwan			
Family First	Audrey Harmse			
Liberal	Fiona Ottey			
One Nation	Geoff McMahon			
Total formal votes				
Informal votes				
Turnout				

==== 2022 ====
2022 Australian federal election: Isaacs
Party	Candidate	Votes	%	±%
Labor	Mark Dreyfus	39,228	39.95	−4.95
Liberal	Robbie Beaton	31,306	31.89	−3.36
Greens	Alex Breskin	12,621	12.85	+1.78
United Australia	Scott McCamish	4,855	4.94	+0.95
Liberal Democrats	Sarah O'Donnell	4,785	4.87	+4.87
One Nation	Boris Sokiransky	3,130	3.19	+3.19
Animal Justice	Alix Livingstone	2,259	2.30	−1.30
Total formal votes		98,184	96.67	+0.80
Informal votes		3,382	3.33	−0.80
Turnout		101,566	91.77	−1.73
Two-party-preferred result
Labor	Mark Dreyfus	55,818	56.85	+0.39
Liberal	Robbie Beaton	42,366	43.15	−0.39
Labor hold		Swing	+0.39	

Alluvial diagram for preference flows in the seat of Isaacs in the 2022 federal election. indicates at what stage the winning candidate had over 50% of the votes and was declared the winner.

=== Elections in the 2010s ===
==== 2019 ====
2019 Australian federal election: Isaacs
Party	Candidate	Votes	%	±%
Labor	Mark Dreyfus	43,364	44.78	+3.84
Liberal	Jeremy Hearn	34,089	35.20	−7.45
Greens	Kim Samiotis	10,822	11.18	+0.46
United Australia	Tony Seals	3,813	3.94	+3.94
Animal Justice	Bronwyn Currie	3,607	3.72	−0.62
Rise Up Australia	Ash Puvimanasinghe	1,142	1.18	+0.53
Total formal votes		96,837	95.86	−0.73
Informal votes		4,180	4.14	+0.73
Turnout		101,017	93.28	+1.03
Two-party-preferred result
Labor	Mark Dreyfus	54,645	56.43	+3.45
Liberal	Jeremy Hearn	42,192	43.57	−3.45
Labor hold		Swing	+3.45	

==== 2016 ====
2016 Australian federal election: Isaacs
Party	Candidate	Votes	%	±%
Labor	Mark Dreyfus	41,144	44.49	+3.16
Liberal	Garry Spencer	37,312	40.35	+0.14
Greens	Alex Breskin	9,429	10.20	+3.14
Animal Justice	Elizabeth Johnston	4,585	4.96	+4.96
Total formal votes		92,470	96.31	+1.11
Informal votes		3,539	3.69	−1.11
Turnout		96,009	90.78	−2.26
Two-party-preferred result
Labor	Mark Dreyfus	51,538	55.73	+1.87
Liberal	Garry Spencer	40,932	44.27	−1.87
Labor hold		Swing	+1.87	

==== 2013 ====
2013 Australian federal election: Isaacs
Party	Candidate	Votes	%	±%
Labor	Mark Dreyfus	35,837	41.33	−7.55
Liberal	Garry Spencer	34,864	40.21	+5.12
Greens	Sandra Miles	6,120	7.06	−3.84
Palmer United	Avtar Gill	2,846	3.28	+3.28
Family First	John Elliott	2,503	2.89	−0.76
Sex Party	Laith Graham	2,093	2.41	+2.41
Democratic Labour	James Leach	1,144	1.32	+1.32
Christians	Karen Dobby	743	0.86	+0.86
Rise Up Australia	Nadia Seaman	558	0.64	+0.64
Total formal votes		86,708	95.20	−0.09
Informal votes		4,375	4.80	+0.09
Turnout		91,083	93.01	+0.09
Two-party-preferred result
Labor	Mark Dreyfus	46,704	53.86	−6.55
Liberal	Garry Spencer	40,004	46.14	+6.55
Labor hold		Swing	−6.55	

==== 2010 ====
2010 Australian federal election: Isaacs
Party	Candidate	Votes	%	±%
Labor	Mark Dreyfus	45,131	49.42	+0.67
Liberal	Dale McClelland	31,472	34.47	−4.00
Greens	Chris Carman	9,980	10.93	+4.69
Family First	Heather Wheatley	3,377	3.70	+1.15
Independent	Gordon Ford	1,355	1.48	+0.22
Total formal votes		91,315	95.29	−1.40
Informal votes		4,516	4.71	+1.40
Turnout		95,831	93.23	−1.95
Two-party-preferred result
Labor	Mark Dreyfus	55,721	61.02	+3.33
Liberal	Dale McClelland	35,594	38.98	−3.33
Labor hold		Swing	+3.33	

=== Elections in the 2000s ===
==== 2007 ====
2007 Australian federal election: Isaacs
Party	Candidate	Votes	%	±%
Labor	Mark Dreyfus	44,056	48.76	+4.45
Liberal	Ross Fox	34,762	38.47	−4.82
Greens	Colin Long	5,636	6.24	−1.07
Family First	Jadah Pleiter	2,308	2.55	+0.15
Democrats	Laura Chipp	1,970	2.18	+1.15
Independent	Gordon Ford	1,137	1.26	+0.49
Liberty & Democracy	Robert Norrie	492	0.54	+0.54
Total formal votes		90,361	96.69	+1.73
Informal votes		3,092	3.31	−1.73
Turnout		93,453	95.18	−0.07
Two-party-preferred result
Labor	Mark Dreyfus	52,131	57.69	+6.21
Liberal	Ross Fox	38,230	42.31	−6.21
Labor hold		Swing	+6.21	

==== 2004 ====
2004 Australian federal election: Isaacs
Party	Candidate	Votes	%	±%
Labor	Ann Corcoran	37,245	44.31	−2.93
Liberal	Jeff Shelley	36,391	43.29	+5.23
Greens	Sean Hardy	6,143	7.31	+3.35
Family First	Jacob Mathews	2,019	2.40	+2.40
Democrats	Haydn Fletcher	862	1.03	−6.05
Independent	Gordon Ford	650	0.77	+0.77
One Nation	Carl Groves	536	0.64	−0.55
Citizens Electoral Council	Martha Malliotis	214	0.25	+0.04
Total formal votes		84,060	94.96	−0.37
Informal votes		4,464	5.04	+0.37
Turnout		88,524	95.25	+0.11
Two-party-preferred result
Labor	Ann Corcoran	43,277	51.48	−5.14
Liberal	Jeff Shelley	40,783	48.52	+5.14
Labor hold		Swing	−5.14	

==== 2001 ====
2001 Australian federal election: Isaacs
Party	Candidate	Votes	%	±%
Labor	Ann Corcoran	31,951	42.18	−6.25
Liberal	Michael Shepherdson	31,520	41.61	+3.44
Democrats	Haydn Fletcher	5,627	7.43	+1.50
Greens	Darren Bujeya	3,073	4.06	+1.92
One Nation	John Groves	1,358	1.79	−2.25
Independent	Shirly Oakley	1,342	1.77	+1.77
Independent	Patricia Brook	640	0.84	+0.84
Citizens Electoral Council	Heather Stanton	246	0.32	+0.32
Total formal votes		75,757	95.35	−1.03
Informal votes		3,691	4.65	+1.03
Turnout		79,448	97.11	
Two-party-preferred result
Labor	Ann Corcoran	40,011	52.81	−3.59
Liberal	Michael Shepherdson	35,746	47.19	+3.59
Labor hold		Swing	−3.59	

==== 2000 by-election ====
2000 Isaacs by-election
Party	Candidate	Votes	%	±%
Labor	Ann Corcoran	34,483	56.54	+8.11
Democrats	Haydn Fletcher	10,540	17.28	+11.36
Greens	Mary Hutchison	5,539	9.08	+6.94
Independent	Carl Wesley	5,329	8.74	+8.74
Australia First	Patricia Brook	3,270	5.36	+4.92
Democratic Labor	Gail King	1,832	3.00	+3.00
Total formal votes		60,993	91.84	−4.55
Informal votes		5,420	8.16	+4.55
Turnout		66,413	81.65	−14.56
Two-candidate-preferred result
Labor	Ann Corcoran	40,280	66.04	+9.64
Democrats	Haydn Fletcher	20,713	33.96	+33.96
Labor hold		Swing	N/A	

=== Elections in the 1990s ===
==== 1998 ====
1998 Australian federal election: Isaacs
Party	Candidate	Votes	%	±%
Labor	Greg Wilton	35,604	48.43	+4.38
Liberal	Mike Rawlinson	28,060	38.17	−3.89
Democrats	Robert Ryan	4,355	5.92	−3.65
One Nation	Denis Reed-Smith	2,971	4.04	+4.04
Greens	Daniel Tirawa	1,570	2.14	+2.14
Unity	Mija Carkeek	421	0.57	+0.57
Australia First	Patricia Brook	325	0.44	+0.44
Natural Law	Amanda McIntosh	211	0.29	−0.56
Total formal votes		73,517	96.39	−0.82
Informal votes		2,754	3.61	+0.82
Turnout		76,271	96.21	+0.00
Two-party-preferred result
Labor	Greg Wilton	41,467	56.40	+4.84
Liberal	Mike Rawlinson	32,050	43.60	−4.84
Labor hold		Swing	+4.84	

==== 1996 ====
1996 Australian federal election: Isaacs
Party	Candidate	Votes	%	±%
Labor	Greg Wilton	30,997	44.05	−4.91
Liberal	Rod Atkinson	29,595	42.06	−1.38
Democrats	Kaylyn Raynor	6,734	9.57	+5.12
Against Further Immigration	Angela Walker	2,448	3.48	+3.48
Natural Law	Jan Allison	597	0.85	−1.42
Total formal votes		70,371	97.20	−0.19
Informal votes		2,024	2.80	+0.19
Turnout		72,395	96.21	−0.21
Two-party-preferred result
Labor	Greg Wilton	36,158	51.56	−2.35
Liberal	Rod Atkinson	33,965	48.44	+2.35
Labor notional hold		Swing	−2.35	

==== 1993 ====
1993 Australian federal election: Isaacs
Party	Candidate	Votes	%	±%
Liberal	Rod Atkinson	35,792	50.55	+0.07
Labor	John McSwiney	30,007	42.38	+8.48
Democrats	Kaylyn Raynor	3,546	5.01	−10.60
Natural Law	Judee Horin	1,458	2.06	+2.06
Total formal votes		70,803	97.57	+0.60
Informal votes		1,761	2.43	−0.60
Turnout		72,564	96.42	
Two-party-preferred result
Liberal	Rod Atkinson	37,490	52.98	−2.74
Labor	John McSwiney	33,266	47.02	+2.74
Liberal hold		Swing	−2.74	

==== 1990 ====
1990 Australian federal election: Isaacs
Party	Candidate	Votes	%	±%
Liberal	Rod Atkinson	35,160	50.5	+4.5
Labor	Jim Ensor	23,613	33.9	−10.9
Democrats	Darren Koch	10,874	15.6	+8.4
Total formal votes		69,647	97.0	
Informal votes		2,173	3.0	
Turnout		71,820	95.9	
Two-party-preferred result
Liberal	Rod Atkinson	38,775	55.7	+5.5
Labor	Jim Ensor	30,806	44.3	−5.5
Liberal notional hold		Swing	+5.5	

=== Elections in the 1980s ===
==== 1987 ====
1987 Australian federal election: Isaacs
Party	Candidate	Votes	%	±%
Labor	David Charles	29,325	47.7	−3.2
Liberal	Rod Atkinson	26,448	43.1	+3.0
Democrats	Maxine Aspinall	4,428	7.2	+1.1
National	Bill Buchanan	833	1.4	+0.1
Independent	Linda Ely	395	0.6	+0.6
Total formal votes		61,429	95.5	
Informal votes		2,891	4.5	
Turnout		64,320	95.2	
Two-party-preferred result
Labor	David Charles	32,351	52.7	−1.7
Liberal	Rod Atkinson	29,057	47.3	+1.7
Labor hold		Swing	−1.7	

==== 1984 ====
1984 Australian federal election: Isaacs
Party	Candidate	Votes	%	±%
Labor	David Charles	30,612	50.9	−2.0
Liberal	Peter Zablud	24,079	40.1	−0.4
Democrats	Peter Lindemann	3,693	6.1	−0.6
Democratic Labor	Dudley de Rozario	933	1.6	+1.6
National	Charles Lacey	774	1.3	+1.3
Total formal votes		60,091	92.5	
Informal votes		4,894	7.5	
Turnout		64,985	95.3	
Two-party-preferred result
Labor	David Charles	32,681	54.4	−2.5
Liberal	Peter Zablud	27,407	45.6	+2.5
Labor hold		Swing	−2.5	

==== 1983 ====
1983 Australian federal election: Isaacs
Party	Candidate	Votes	%	±%
Labor	David Charles	38,630	55.0	+9.9
Liberal	Ann Dunkley	26,964	38.4	+0.4
Democrats	Terence Gough	4,689	6.7	−7.4
Total formal votes		70,283	98.4	
Informal votes		1,169	1.6	
Turnout		71,452	96.1	
Two-party-preferred result
Labor	David Charles		59.0	+7.2
Liberal	Ann Dunkley		41.0	−7.2
Labor hold		Swing	+7.2	

==== 1980 ====
1980 Australian federal election: Isaacs
Party	Candidate	Votes	%	±%
Labor	David Charles	31,192	45.1	+10.5
Liberal	Bill Burns	26,293	38.0	−6.4
Democrats	Michael Bakos	9,777	14.1	−2.9
Independent	Sydney Balhorn	1,955	2.8	+2.8
Total formal votes		69,217	97.8	
Informal votes		1,534	2.2	
Turnout		70,751	95.4	
Two-party-preferred result
Labor	David Charles	35,856	51.8	+9.1
Liberal	Bill Burns	33,361	48.2	−9.1
Labor gain from Liberal		Swing	+9.1	

=== Elections in the 1970s ===
==== 1977 ====
1977 Australian federal election: Isaacs
Party	Candidate	Votes	%	±%
Liberal	Bill Burns	29,857	44.4	−6.8
Labor	Kenneth Williams	23,275	34.6	−8.2
Democrats	Francis McLeod	11,427	17.0	+17.0
Democratic Labor	Ralph Cleary	2,741	4.1	+0.8
Total formal votes		67,300	97.7	
Informal votes		1,550	2.3	
Turnout		68,850	95.9	
Two-party-preferred result
Liberal	Bill Burns	38,595	57.3	+2.4
Labor	Kenneth Williams	28,705	42.7	−2.4
Liberal hold		Swing	+2.4	

==== 1975 ====
1975 Australian federal election: Isaacs
Party	Candidate	Votes	%	±%
Liberal	David Hamer	30,646	53.2	+8.8
Labor	Gareth Clayton	23,506	40.8	−5.3
Democratic Labor	Ralph Cleary	1,917	3.3	−0.5
Australia	Eldon Simmons	805	1.4	−1.1
Independent	Marc Aussie-Stone	719	1.2	+1.2
Total formal votes		57,593	98.3	
Informal votes		975	1.7	
Turnout		58,568	95.7	
Two-party-preferred result
Liberal	David Hamer		56.9	+7.5
Labor	Gareth Clayton		43.1	−7.5
Liberal gain from Labor		Swing	+7.5	

==== 1974 ====
1974 Australian federal election: Isaacs
Party	Candidate	Votes	%	±%
Labor	Gareth Clayton	26,225	46.1	+0.3
Liberal	David Hamer	25,267	44.4	+2.0
Democratic Labor	William Leech	2,179	3.8	−3.2
Australia	Elizabeth Chesterfield	1,443	2.5	−2.3
Independent	James Bernard	1,181	2.1	+2.1
Independent	Janus Fawke	597	1.0	+1.0
Total formal votes		56,892	98.2	
Informal votes		1,062	1.8	
Turnout		57,954	95.6	
Two-party-preferred result
Labor	Gareth Clayton		50.6	+1.7
Liberal	David Hamer		49.4	−1.7
Labor gain from Liberal		Swing	+1.7	

==== 1972 ====
1972 Australian federal election: Isaacs
Party	Candidate	Votes	%	±%
Labor	Gareth Clayton	23,904	45.8	+5.7
Liberal	David Hamer	22,110	42.4	−5.3
Democratic Labor	Frederick Skinner	3,635	7.0	−3.1
Australia	Peter Harrie	2,499	4.8	+4.8
Total formal votes		52,148	98.7	
Informal votes		685	1.3	
Turnout		52,833	95.6	
Two-party-preferred result
Liberal	David Hamer	26,664	51.1	−6.9
Labor	Gareth Clayton	25,484	48.9	+6.9
Liberal hold		Swing	−6.9	

=== Elections in the 1960s ===
==== 1969 ====
1969 Australian federal election: Isaacs
Party	Candidate	Votes	%	±%
Liberal	David Hamer	23,525	47.7	−1.4
Labor	Alan Roberts	19,751	40.1	+4.2
Democratic Labor	Frederick Skinner	4,967	10.1	−0.4
Independent	Liane Wessley	1,026	2.1	+2.1
Total formal votes		49,269	97.8	
Informal votes		1,129	2.2	
Turnout		50,398	95.3	
Two-party-preferred result
Liberal	David Hamer	28,562	58.0	−3.2
Labor	Alan Roberts	20,707	42.0	+3.2
Liberal notional hold		Swing	−3.2	
