= Members of the Australian House of Representatives, 1998–2001 =

This is a list of members of the Australian House of Representatives from 1998 to 2001, as elected at the 1998 election.

Member	Party	Electorate	State	Term in office
Tony Abbott	Liberal	Warringah	NSW	1994–2019
Dick Adams	Labor	Lyons	Tas	1993–2013
Anthony Albanese	Labor	Grayndler	NSW	1996–present
John Anderson	National	Gwydir	NSW	1989–2007
Peter Andren	Independent	Calare	NSW	1996–2007
Neil Andrew	Liberal	Wakefield	SA	1983–2004
Kevin Andrews	Liberal	Menzies	Vic	1991–2022
Larry Anthony	National	Richmond	NSW	1996–2004
Fran Bailey	Liberal	McEwen	Vic	1990–1993, 1996–2010
Bruce Baird	Liberal	Cook	NSW	1998–2007
Phil Barresi	Liberal	Deakin	Vic	1996–2007
Kerry Bartlett	Liberal	Macquarie	NSW	1996–2007
Kim Beazley	Labor	Brand	WA	1980–2007
Arch Bevis	Labor	Brisbane	Qld	1990–2010
Bruce Billson	Liberal	Dunkley	Vic	1996–2016
Bronwyn Bishop	Liberal	Mackellar	NSW	1996–2016
Julie Bishop	Liberal	Curtin	WA	1998–2019
Laurie Brereton	Labor	Kingsford Smith	NSW	1990–2004
Mal Brough	Liberal	Longman	Qld	1996–2007, 2013–2016
Anna Burke	Labor	Chisholm	Vic	1998–2016
Anthony Byrne ^{[1]}	Labor	Holt	Vic	1999–2022
Alan Cadman	Liberal	Mitchell	NSW	1974–2007
Ross Cameron	Liberal	Parramatta	NSW	1996–2004
Ian Causley	National	Page	NSW	1996–2007
Bob Charles	Liberal	La Trobe	Vic	1990–2004
Ann Corcoran^{[2]}	Labor	Isaacs	Vic	2000–2007
Peter Costello	Liberal	Higgins	Vic	1990–2009
David Cox	Labor	Kingston	SA	1998–2004
Simon Crean	Labor	Hotham	Vic	1990–2013
Janice Crosio	Labor	Prospect	NSW	1990–2004
Michael Danby	Labor	Melbourne Ports	Vic	1998–2019
Alexander Downer	Liberal	Mayo	SA	1984–2008
Trish Draper	Liberal	Makin	SA	1996–2007
Graham Edwards	Labor	Cowan	WA	1998–2007
Annette Ellis	Labor	Canberra	ACT	1996–2010
Kay Elson	Liberal	Forde	Qld	1996–2007
Craig Emerson	Labor	Rankin	Qld	1998–2013
Warren Entsch	Liberal	Leichhardt	Qld	1996–2007, 2010–2025
Gareth Evans ^{[1]}	Labor	Holt	Vic	1996–1999
Martyn Evans	Labor	Bonython	SA	1994–2004
John Fahey	Liberal	Macarthur	NSW	1996–2001
Laurie Ferguson	Labor	Reid	NSW	1990–2016
Martin Ferguson	Labor	Batman	Vic	1996–2013
Tim Fischer	National	Farrer	NSW	1984–2001
Joel Fitzgibbon	Labor	Hunter	NSW	1996–2022
John Forrest	National	Mallee	Vic	1993–2013
Chris Gallus	Liberal	Hindmarsh	SA	1990–2004
Teresa Gambaro	Liberal	Petrie	Qld	1996–2007, 2010–2016
Joanna Gash	Liberal	Gilmore	NSW	1996–2013
Petro Georgiou	Liberal	Kooyong	Vic	1994–2010
Jane Gerick	Labor	Canning	WA	1998–2001
Steve Gibbons	Labor	Bendigo	Vic	1998–2013
Julia Gillard	Labor	Lalor	Vic	1998–2013
Alan Griffin	Labor	Bruce	Vic	1993–2016
Barry Haase	Liberal	Kalgoorlie	WA	1998–2013
Jill Hall	Labor	Shortland	NSW	1998–2016
Gary Hardgrave	Liberal	Moreton	Qld	1996–2007
Michael Hatton	Labor	Blaxland	NSW	1996–2007
David Hawker	Liberal	Wannon	Vic	1983–2010
Kelly Hoare	Labor	Charlton	NSW	1998–2007
Joe Hockey	Liberal	North Sydney	NSW	1996–2015
Colin Hollis	Labor	Throsby	NSW	1983–2001
Bob Horne	Labor	Paterson	NSW	1993–1996, 1998–2001
John Howard	Liberal	Bennelong	NSW	1974–2007
Kay Hull	National	Riverina	NSW	1998–2010
Julia Irwin	Labor	Fowler	NSW	1998–2010
Harry Jenkins	Labor	Scullin	Vic	1986–2013
David Jull	Liberal	Fadden	Qld	1975–1983, 1984–2007
Bob Katter	National	Kennedy	Qld	1993–present
De-Anne Kelly	National	Dawson	Qld	1996–2007
Jackie Kelly	Liberal	Lindsay	NSW	1996–2007
David Kemp	Liberal	Goldstein	Vic	1990–2004
Cheryl Kernot	Labor	Dickson	Qld	1998–2001
Duncan Kerr	Labor	Denison	Tas	1987–2010
Mark Latham	Labor	Werriwa	NSW	1994–2005
Carmen Lawrence	Labor	Fremantle	WA	1994–2007
Tony Lawler	National	Parkes	NSW	1998–2001
Michael Lee	Labor	Dobell	NSW	1984–2001
Lou Lieberman	Liberal	Indi	Vic	1993–2001
Peter Lindsay	Liberal	Herbert	Qld	1996–2010
Kirsten Livermore	Labor	Capricornia	Qld	1998–2013
Jim Lloyd	Liberal	Robertson	NSW	1996–2007
Stewart McArthur	Liberal	Corangamite	Vic	1984–2007
Robert McClelland	Labor	Barton	NSW	1996–2013
Ian Macfarlane	Liberal	Groom	Qld	1998–2016
Stephen Martin	Labor	Cunningham	NSW	1984–2002
Margaret May	Liberal	McPherson	Qld	1998–2010
Jann McFarlane	Labor	Stirling	WA	1998–2004
Peter McGauran	National	Gippsland	Vic	1983–2008
Leo McLeay	Labor	Watson	NSW	1979–2004
Bob McMullan	Labor	Fraser	ACT	1996–2010
Jenny Macklin	Labor	Jagajaga	Vic	1996–2019
Daryl Melham	Labor	Banks	NSW	1990–2013
John Moore ^{[4]}	Liberal	Ryan	Qld	1975–2001
Allan Morris	Labor	Newcastle	NSW	1983–2001
Frank Mossfield	Labor	Greenway	NSW	1996–2004
Judi Moylan	Liberal	Pearce	WA	1993–2013
John Murphy	Labor	Lowe	NSW	1998–2013
Garry Nehl	National	Cowper	NSW	1984–2001
Gary Nairn	Liberal	Eden-Monaro	NSW	1996–2007
Brendan Nelson	Liberal	Bradfield	NSW	1996–2009
Paul Neville	National	Hinkler	Qld	1993–2013
Peter Nugent ^{[5]}	Liberal	Aston	Vic	1990–2001
Michelle O'Byrne	Labor	Bass	Tas	1998–2004
Gavan O'Connor	Labor	Corio	Vic	1993–2007
Neil O'Keefe	Labor	Burke	Vic	1984–2001
Chris Pearce ^{[5]}	Liberal	Aston	Vic	2001–2010
Tanya Plibersek	Labor	Sydney	NSW	1998–present
Roger Price	Labor	Chifley	NSW	1984–2010
Geoff Prosser	Liberal	Forrest	WA	1987–2007
Christopher Pyne	Liberal	Sturt	SA	1993–2019
Harry Quick	Labor	Franklin	Tas	1993–2007
Peter Reith	Liberal	Flinders	Vic	1982–1983, 1984–2001
Bernie Ripoll	Labor	Oxley	Qld	1998–2016
Michael Ronaldson	Liberal	Ballarat	Vic	1990–2001
Nicola Roxon	Labor	Gellibrand	Vic	1998–2013
Kevin Rudd	Labor	Griffith	Qld	1998–2013
Philip Ruddock	Liberal	Berowra	NSW	1973–2016
Rod Sawford	Labor	Port Adelaide	SA	1988–2007
Alby Schultz	Liberal	Hume	NSW	1998–2013
Con Sciacca	Labor	Bowman	Qld	1987–1996, 1998–2004
Bruce Scott	National	Maranoa	Qld	1990–2016
Patrick Secker	Liberal	Barker	SA	1998–2013
Bob Sercombe	Labor	Maribyrnong	Vic	1996–2007
Leonie Short ^{[4]}	Labor	Ryan	Qld	2001
Sid Sidebottom	Labor	Braddon	Tas	1998–2004, 2007–2013
Peter Slipper	Liberal	Fisher	Qld	1984–1987, 1993–2013
Stephen Smith	Labor	Perth	WA	1993–2013
Warren Snowdon	Labor	Northern Territory	NT	1987–1996, 1998–2022
Alex Somlyay	Liberal	Fairfax	Qld	1990–2013
Andrew Southcott	Liberal	Boothby	SA	1996–2016
Stuart St. Clair	National	New England	NSW	1998–2001
Sharman Stone	Liberal	Murray	Vic	1996–2016
Wayne Swan	Labor	Lilley	Qld	1993–1996, 1998–2019
Kathy Sullivan	Liberal	Moncrieff	Qld	1984–2001
Lindsay Tanner	Labor	Melbourne	Vic	1993–2010
Andrew Theophanous	Labor/Independent^{[3]}	Calwell	Vic	1980–2001
Cameron Thompson	Liberal	Blair	Qld	1998–2007
Andrew Thomson	Liberal	Wentworth	NSW	1995–2001
Kelvin Thomson	Labor	Wills	Vic	1996–2016
Warren Truss	National	Wide Bay	Qld	1990–2016
Wilson Tuckey	Liberal	O'Connor	WA	1980–2010
Mark Vaile	National	Lyne	NSW	1993–2008
Danna Vale	Liberal	Hughes	NSW	1996–2010
Barry Wakelin	Liberal	Grey	SA	1993–2007
Mal Washer	Liberal	Moore	WA	1998–2013
Kim Wilkie	Labor	Swan	WA	1998–2007
Daryl Williams	Liberal	Tangney	WA	1993–2004
Greg Wilton^{[2]}	Labor	Isaacs	Vic	1996–2000
Michael Wooldridge	Liberal	Casey	Vic	1987–2001
Trish Worth	Liberal	Adelaide	SA	1996–2004
Christian Zahra	Labor	McMillan	Vic	1998–2004

^{1} The Labor member for Holt (VIC), Gareth Evans, resigned on 30 September 1999; Labor candidate Anthony Byrne won the resulting by-election on 6 November.
^{2} The Labor member for Isaacs (VIC), Greg Wilton, died on 14 June 2000; Labor candidate Ann Corcoran won the resulting by-election on 12 August.
^{3} Andrew Theophanous, the member for Calwell (VIC), resigned from the Labor party on 18 October 2000, serving for the remainder of his term as an independent.
^{4} Liberal member John Moore, member for the western Brisbane seat of Ryan, resigned on 5 February 2001; Labor candidate Leonie Short won the resulting by-election on 17 March.
^{5} Liberal member Peter Nugent, member for Aston (VIC), died on 24 April 2001; Liberal candidate Chris Pearce won the resulting by-election on 14 July.
