= Electoral results for the Division of Holt =

Australian division election results

This is a list of electoral results for the Division of Holt in Australian federal elections from the division's creation in 1969 until the present.

== Members ==
Member	Party	Term
Len Reid	Liberal	1969–1972
Max Oldmeadow	Labor	1972–1975
William Yates	Liberal	1975–1980
Michael Duffy	Labor	1980–1996
Gareth Evans	Labor	1996–1999
Anthony Byrne	Labor	1999–2022
Cassandra Fernando	Labor	2022–present

== Election results ==
=== Elections in the 2020s ===
==== 2025 ====
2025 Australian federal election: Holt
Party	Candidate	Votes	%	±%
Family First	Shane Foreman			
Greens	Payal Tiwari			
One Nation	Trevor Hammond			
Legalise Cannabis	Riley Aickin			
Labor	Cassandra Fernando			
Liberal	Annette Samuel			
Total formal votes				
Informal votes				
Turnout				

==== 2022 ====
2022 Australian federal election: Holt
Party	Candidate	Votes	%	±%
Labor	Cassandra Fernando	36,326	40.86	−9.68
Liberal	Ranj Perera	26,274	29.56	−6.21
United Australia	Gerardine Hansen	8,592	9.67	+3.52
Greens	Sujit Mathew	7,583	8.53	+1.37
One Nation	Sandy Ambard	4,295	4.83	+4.70
Independent	Ravi Ragupathy	2,673	3.01	+3.01
Liberal Democrats	Matthew Nunez-Silva	2,423	2.73	+2.73
Federation	Gregory Saldana	730	0.82	+0.82
Total formal votes		88,896	93.45	−2.38
Informal votes		6,227	6.55	+2.38
Turnout		95,123	88.57	−0.94
Two-party-preferred result
Labor	Cassandra Fernando	50,777	57.12	−1.51
Liberal	Ranj Perera	38,119	42.88	+1.51
Labor hold		Swing	−1.51	

Alluvial diagram for preference flows in the seat of Holt in the 2022 federal election. indicates at what stage the winning candidate had over 50% of the votes and was declared the winner.

=== Elections in the 2010s ===
==== 2019 ====
2019 Australian federal election: Holt
Party	Candidate	Votes	%	±%
Labor	Anthony Byrne	48,031	50.73	+1.92
Liberal	Jennifer Van Den Broek	33,963	35.87	+2.11
Greens	Jess Wheelock	6,735	7.11	+0.59
United Australia	Jatinder Singh	5,958	6.29	+6.29
Total formal votes		94,687	95.88	+0.78
Informal votes		4,069	4.12	−0.78
Turnout		98,756	92.46	+4.39
Two-party-preferred result
Labor	Anthony Byrne	55,577	58.70	−1.24
Liberal	Jennifer Van Den Broek	39,110	41.30	+1.24
Labor hold		Swing	−1.24	

==== 2016 ====
2016 Australian federal election: Holt
Party	Candidate	Votes	%	±%
Labor	Anthony Byrne	53,506	53.70	+5.51
Liberal	James Mathias	29,777	29.89	−2.74
Greens	Jake Tilton	6,317	6.34	+2.46
Family First	Neil Bull	5,614	5.63	+3.13
Rise Up Australia	Colin Robertson	4,416	4.43	+3.39
Total formal votes		99,630	95.00	+1.08
Informal votes		5,243	5.00	−1.08
Turnout		104,873	90.18	−2.63
Two-party-preferred result
Labor	Anthony Byrne	63,929	64.17	+5.08
Liberal	James Mathias	35,701	35.83	−5.08
Labor hold		Swing	+5.08	

==== 2013 ====
2013 Australian federal election: Holt
Party	Candidate	Votes	%	±%
Labor	Anthony Byrne	43,096	48.19	−6.92
Liberal	Ricardo Balancy	29,181	32.63	+2.72
Palmer United	Jatinder Singh	4,931	5.51	+5.51
Greens	Jackie McCullough	3,469	3.88	−5.32
Sex Party	Lachlan Smith	2,514	2.81	+2.81
Family First	Pam Keenan	2,232	2.50	−2.46
Democratic Labour	Michael Palma	1,835	2.05	+2.05
Christians	Vivian Hill	1,232	1.38	+1.38
Rise Up Australia	Jonathan Eli	933	1.04	+1.04
Total formal votes		89,423	93.92	−0.24
Informal votes		5,789	6.08	+0.24
Turnout		95,212	92.81	+0.65
Two-party-preferred result
Labor	Anthony Byrne	52,836	59.09	−4.88
Liberal	Ricardo Balancy	36,587	40.91	+4.88
Labor hold		Swing	−4.88	

==== 2010 ====
2010 Australian federal election: Holt
Party	Candidate	Votes	%	±%
Labor	Anthony Byrne	51,998	54.42	−1.23
Liberal	Ricardo Balancy	29,254	30.62	−3.60
Greens	Frank di Mascolo	8,745	9.15	+5.03
Family First	Ian George	4,772	4.99	+0.60
Secular	Mark Hitchins	776	0.81	+0.81
Total formal votes		95,545	94.31	−2.13
Informal votes		5,764	5.69	+2.13
Turnout		101,309	93.04	−2.39
Two-party-preferred result
Labor	Anthony Byrne	60,412	63.23	+1.60
Liberal	Ricardo Balancy	35,133	36.77	−1.60
Labor hold		Swing	+1.60	

=== Elections in the 2000s ===
==== 2007 ====
2007 Australian federal election: Holt
Party	Candidate	Votes	%	±%
Labor	Anthony Byrne	51,689	55.65	+9.98
Liberal	Emanuele Cicchiello	31,785	34.22	−8.63
Family First	Yasmin de Zilwa	4,076	4.39	+0.22
Greens	Lynette Keleher	3,823	4.12	−0.34
Democrats	Ken Seymour	1,155	1.24	−0.18
Citizens Electoral Council	Chris Morgan	347	0.37	−1.06
Total formal votes		92,875	96.44	+0.79
Informal votes		3,430	3.56	−0.79
Turnout		96,305	95.46	+0.41
Two-party-preferred result
Labor	Anthony Byrne	57,237	61.63	+10.12
Liberal	Emanuele Cicchiello	35,638	38.37	−10.12
Labor hold		Swing	+10.12	

==== 2004 ====
2004 Australian federal election: Holt
Party	Candidate	Votes	%	±%
Labor	Anthony Byrne	37,269	45.67	−4.29
Liberal	Paul Teiwes	34,974	42.85	+6.72
Greens	Jim Reiher	3,638	4.46	+1.74
Family First	Stephen Burgess	3,403	4.17	+4.17
Citizens Electoral Council	Jason John	1,169	1.43	+1.34
Democrats	Daniel Berk	1,160	1.42	−5.69
Total formal votes		81,613	95.65	+0.40
Informal votes		3,710	4.35	−0.40
Turnout		85,323	95.05	+0.95
Two-party-preferred result
Labor	Anthony Byrne	42,036	51.51	−6.40
Liberal	Paul Teiwes	39,577	48.49	+6.40
Labor hold		Swing	−6.40	

==== 2001 ====
2001 Australian federal election: Holt
Party	Candidate	Votes	%	±%
Labor	Anthony Byrne	44,681	56.50	−3.29
Liberal	Jason Wood	24,621	31.13	+1.60
Democrats	Polly Morgan	5,240	6.63	+0.64
Greens	Theos Patrinos	2,149	2.72	+2.72
Christian Democrats	Lynne Dickson	1,513	1.91	+0.16
	Gordon Ford	880	1.11	+1.11
Total formal votes		79,084	95.06	−0.41
Informal votes		4,109	4.94	+0.41
Turnout		83,193	95.05	
Two-party-preferred result
Labor	Anthony Byrne	50,078	63.32	−1.79
Liberal	Jason Wood	29,006	36.68	+1.79
Labor hold		Swing	−1.79	

=== Elections in the 1990s ===
1999 Holt by-election
Party	Candidate	Votes	%	±%
Labor	Anthony Byrne	48,499	65.63	+5.85
Democrats	Polly Morgan	10,896	14.74	+8.75
Democratic Labor	John Mulholland	5,404	7.31	+7.31
Greens	Daniel Scoullar	4,701	6.36	+6.36
Christian Democrats	Lynne Dickson	4,399	5.95	+4.20
Total formal votes		73,899	92.81	−2.66
Informal votes		5,727	7.19	+2.66
Turnout		79,626	93.98	−1.23
Two-party-preferred result
Labor	Anthony Byrne	53,252	72.06	+6.95
Democrats	Polly Morgan	20,647	27.94	+21.96
Labor hold		Swing	+6.95	

==== 1998 ====
1998 Australian federal election: Holt
Party	Candidate	Votes	%	±%
Labor	Gareth Evans	44,172	59.78	+4.60
Liberal	Margaret Nicholls	21,823	29.54	−2.51
Democrats	Daniel Berk	4,425	5.99	−1.30
Christian Democrats	Lynne Dickson	1,296	1.75	+1.75
Unity	Kunwar Raj Singh	931	1.26	+1.26
Independent	Robert Bisset	860	1.16	+1.16
Natural Law	Heath Allison	379	0.51	−0.08
Total formal votes		73,886	95.47	+0.01
Informal votes		3,503	4.53	−0.01
Turnout		77,389	95.21	−0.47
Two-party-preferred result
Labor	Gareth Evans	48,109	65.11	+2.30
Liberal	Margaret Nicholls	25,777	34.89	−2.30
Labor hold		Swing	+2.30	

==== 1996 ====
1996 Australian federal election: Holt
Party	Candidate	Votes	%	±%
Labor	Gareth Evans	37,948	55.19	−2.84
Liberal	Tony Williams	22,036	32.05	−2.61
Democrats	Jim Aubrey	5,009	7.28	+3.98
Independent	George Mitsou	1,683	2.45	+2.45
Against Further Immigration	Paul Madigan	1,171	1.70	+1.70
	Liz Mantell	511	0.74	+0.74
Natural Law	Heath Allison	406	0.59	−0.91
Total formal votes		68,764	95.46	−1.15
Informal votes		3,267	4.54	+1.15
Turnout		72,031	95.68	−0.19
Two-party-preferred result
Labor	Gareth Evans	43,078	62.81	+0.37
Liberal	Tony Williams	25,507	37.19	−0.37
Labor hold		Swing	+0.37	

==== 1993 ====
1993 Australian federal election: Holt
Party	Candidate	Votes	%	±%
Labor	Michael Duffy	38,518	56.63	+11.80
Liberal	Barbara Lewis	25,016	36.78	+2.37
Democrats	Michael Burns	2,457	3.61	−8.25
	Stephen Nedeljkovic	1,347	1.98	+1.98
Natural Law	Paul Blackburn	679	1.00	+1.00
Total formal votes		68,017	96.68	+1.48
Informal votes		2,333	3.32	−1.48
Turnout		70,350	95.87	
Two-party-preferred result
Labor	Michael Duffy	40,852	60.10	+3.16
Liberal	Barbara Lewis	27,116	39.90	−3.16
Labor hold		Swing	+3.16	

==== 1990 ====
1990 Australian federal election: Holt
Party	Candidate	Votes	%	±%
Labor	Michael Duffy	27,485	44.8	−11.9
Liberal	Mario Dodic	21,099	34.4	−1.4
Democrats	Irmgard Westphal	7,273	11.9	+4.4
Call to Australia	Lynne Dickson	5,458	8.9	+8.9
Total formal votes		61,315	95.2	
Informal votes		3,091	4.8	
Turnout		64,406	95.2	
Two-party-preferred result
Labor	Michael Duffy	34,882	56.9	−4.1
Liberal	Mario Dodic	26,372	43.1	+4.1
Labor hold		Swing	−4.1	

=== Elections in the 1980s ===
==== 1987 ====
1987 Australian federal election: Holt
Party	Candidate	Votes	%	±%
Labor	Michael Duffy	32,026	56.1	−2.6
Liberal	Janice Bateman	20,764	36.4	+1.6
Democrats	Geoff Herbert	4,282	7.5	+2.8
Total formal votes		57,072	93.1	
Informal votes		4,200	6.9	
Turnout		61,272	93.7	
Two-party-preferred result
Labor	Michael Duffy	34,489	60.4	−1.8
Liberal	Janice Bateman	22,583	39.6	+1.8
Labor hold		Swing	−1.8	

==== 1984 ====
1984 Australian federal election: Holt
Party	Candidate	Votes	%	±%
Labor	Michael Duffy	31,117	58.7	−0.3
Liberal	John Ferwerda	18,436	34.8	+0.6
Democrats	Louise Stewart	2,467	4.7	−2.1
Democratic Labor	Brian McDonald	960	1.8	+1.8
Total formal votes		52,980	89.5	
Informal votes		6,232	10.5	
Turnout		59,212	95.3	
Two-party-preferred result
Labor	Michael Duffy	32,946	62.2	−0.9
Liberal	John Ferwerda	20,034	37.8	+0.9
Labor hold		Swing	−0.9	

==== 1983 ====
1983 Australian federal election: Holt
Party	Candidate	Votes	%	±%
Labor	Michael Duffy	48,648	58.5	+6.4
Liberal	Joseph Moldrich	28,845	34.7	−3.7
Democrats	Jean Yule	5,639	6.8	−0.9
Total formal votes		83,132	97.6	
Informal votes		2,022	2.4	
Turnout		85,154	96.1	
Two-party-preferred result
Labor	Michael Duffy		62.6	+5.7
Liberal	Joseph Moldrich		37.4	−5.7
Labor hold		Swing	+5.7	

==== 1980 ====
1980 Australian federal election: Holt
Party	Candidate	Votes	%	±%
Labor	Michael Duffy	39,232	52.1	+11.9
Liberal	William Yates	28,940	38.4	−4.6
Democrats	Brian Stockton	5,810	7.7	−5.1
Democratic Labor	Michael Rowe	1,352	1.8	−2.3
Total formal votes		75,334	97.2	
Informal votes		2,191	2.8	
Turnout		77,525	95.5	
Two-party-preferred result
Labor	Michael Duffy		56.9	+8.7
Liberal	William Yates		43.1	−8.7
Labor gain from Liberal		Swing	+8.7	

=== Elections in the 1970s ===
==== 1977 ====
1977 Australian federal election: Holt
Party	Candidate	Votes	%	±%
Liberal	William Yates	27,200	43.0	−7.6
Labor	Michael Duffy	25,411	40.2	−3.9
Democrats	Brian Stockton	8,077	12.8	+12.8
Democratic Labor	Kevin Leydon	2,566	4.1	−1.2
Total formal votes		63,254	97.0	
Informal votes		1,950	3.0	
Turnout		65,204	95.1	
Two-party-preferred result
Liberal	William Yates	32,790	51.8	−2.2
Labor	Michael Duffy	30,464	48.2	+2.2
Liberal hold		Swing	−2.2	

==== 1975 ====
1975 Australian federal election: Holt
Party	Candidate	Votes	%	±%
Liberal	William Yates	39,436	48.2	+9.0
Labor	Max Oldmeadow	38,069	46.5	−7.8
Democratic Labor	Robert Fidler	4,343	5.3	+1.9
Total formal votes		81,848	97.6	
Informal votes		2,049	2.4	
Turnout		83,897	95.9	
Two-party-preferred result
Liberal	William Yates	42,241	51.6	+8.5
Labor	Max Oldmeadow	39,607	48.4	−8.5
Liberal gain from Labor		Swing	+8.5	

==== 1974 ====
1974 Australian federal election: Holt
Party	Candidate	Votes	%	±%
Labor	Max Oldmeadow	41,129	54.3	+2.8
Liberal	Len Reid	29,699	39.2	+0.6
Democratic Labor	Robert Fidler	2,546	3.4	−2.7
Australia	Joseph Busuttil	2,371	3.1	+1.2
Total formal votes		75,745	97.5	
Informal votes		1,961	2.5	
Turnout		77,706	96.7	
Two-party-preferred result
Labor	Max Oldmeadow		56.9	+2.5
Liberal	Len Reid		43.1	−2.5
Labor hold		Swing	+2.5	

==== 1972 ====
1972 Australian federal election: Holt
Party	Candidate	Votes	%	±%
Labor	Max Oldmeadow	32,318	51.5	+6.3
Liberal	Len Reid	24,203	38.6	−3.8
Democratic Labor	Henri de Sachau	3,810	6.1	−6.3
Australia	Brenda Elliott	1,222	1.9	+1.9
Defence of Government Schools	Ian Black	1,207	1.9	+1.9
Total formal votes		62,760	97.1	
Informal votes		1,850	2.9	
Turnout		64,610	96.6	
Two-party-preferred result
Labor	Max Oldmeadow		54.4	+7.9
Liberal	Len Reid		45.6	−7.9
Labor gain from Liberal		Swing	+7.9	

=== Elections in the 1960s ===
==== 1969 ====
1969 Australian federal election: Holt
Party	Candidate	Votes	%	±%
Labor	William Wilkinson	22,749	45.2	+12.2
Liberal	Len Reid	21,313	42.4	−8.2
Democratic Labor	Henri de Sachau	6,244	12.4	+0.4
Total formal votes		50,306	96.6	
Informal votes		1,794	3.4	
Turnout		52,100	95.9	
Two-party-preferred result
Liberal	Len Reid	26,938	53.5	−10.1
Labor	William Wilkinson	23,368	46.5	+10.1
Liberal notional hold		Swing	−10.1	
