= Rod Atkinson =

Australian retired politician (born 1948)

Member of the Australian Parliament for Isaacs
- In office 24 March 1990 – 2 March 1996
- Preceded by: David Charles
- Succeeded by: Greg Wilton

Personal details
- Born: Rodney Alexander Atkinson; 7 August 1948 (age 78) Adelaide, South Australia
- Party: Liberal Party of Australia
- Occupation: Soldier

Rodney Alexander Atkinson (born 7 August 1948) is an Australian retired politician who represented the Division of Isaacs in the House of Representatives from 1990 to 1996.

Atkinson served in the Australian Army from 1968 to 1975, serving with the 8th Battalion Royal Australian Regiment in Singapore and Malaysia from 1968 to 1969, and in Vietnam from 1969 to 1970. He was awarded the Vietnam Medal, Vietnam Campaign Medal and Vietnam Gallantry Cross with Palm.

From 1980 to 1988 Atkinson was a Councillor on the City of Mordialloc Council, including a stint as Mayor from 1985 to 1986.

Atkinson was elected to represent the Division of Isaacs in Victoria in the 1990 federal election and re-elected in 1993. While in parliament he acted as Opposition Whip from 7 April 1993 to 26 May 1994. He lost the seat to Labor candidate Greg Wilton in the 1996 federal election, largely due to a redistribution that turned his already marginal seat into a notional Labor seat.

Parliament of Australia
Preceded by David Charles	Member for Isaacs; 1990–1996	Succeeded by Greg Wilton
