= Mark Dreyfus =

Australian politician (born 1956)

The Honourable Mark Dreyfus KC MP
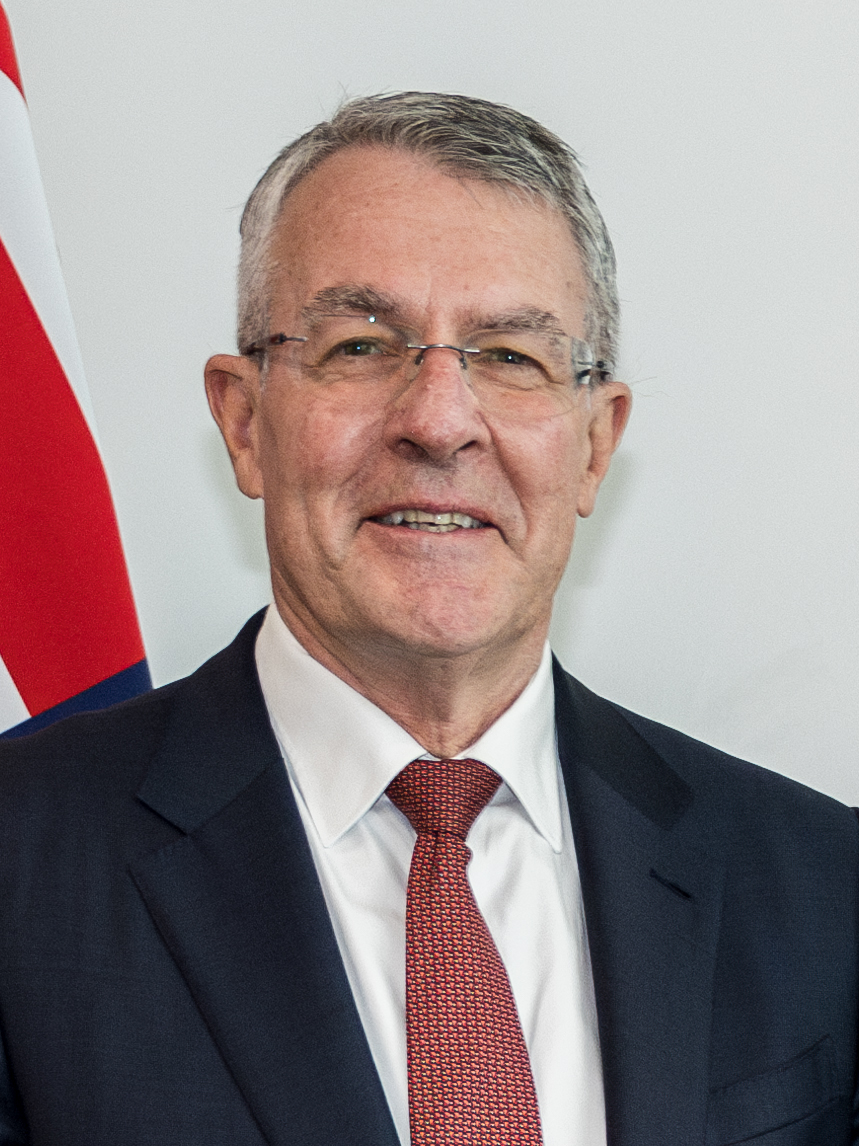
- Dreyfus in 2025

Attorney-General of Australia
- In office 1 June 2022 – 13 May 2025
- Prime Minister: Anthony Albanese
- Preceded by: Michaelia Cash
- Succeeded by: Michelle Rowland
- In office 4 February 2013 – 18 September 2013
- Prime Minister: Julia Gillard; Kevin Rudd
- Preceded by: Nicola Roxon
- Succeeded by: George Brandis

Cabinet Secretary
- In office 1 June 2022 – 13 May 2025
- Prime Minister: Anthony Albanese
- Preceded by: Position re-established
- Succeeded by: Andrew Charlton
- In office 14 September 2010 – 4 February 2013
- Prime Minister: Julia Gillard
- Preceded by: Joe Ludwig
- Succeeded by: Jason Clare

Special Minister of State
- In office 1 July 2013 – 18 September 2013
- Prime Minister: Kevin Rudd
- Preceded by: Gary Gray
- Succeeded by: Michael Ronaldson

Minister for the Public Service and Integrity
- In office 1 July 2013 – 18 September 2013
- Prime Minister: Kevin Rudd
- Preceded by: Gary Gray
- Succeeded by: Eric Abetz

Member of the Australian Parliament for Isaacs
- Incumbent
- Assumed office 24 November 2007
- Preceded by: Ann Corcoran

Personal details
- Born: Mark Alfred Dreyfus; 3 October 1956 (age 70) Perth, Western Australia, Australia
- Party: Labor
- Spouse: Deborah Chemke (m. 1983; died 2023)
- Children: 3
- Education: University of Melbourne
- Profession: Lawyer
- Website: www.markdreyfus.com

Mark Alfred Dreyfus KC (born 3 October 1956) is an Australian politician and lawyer. He is a member of the Australian Labor Party (ALP), and has been the MP for Isaacs since the 2007 election. Dreyfus served as the attorney-general of Australia in 2013 and then 2022 to 2025, and as cabinet secretary from 2010 to 2013 and then 2022 to 2025. In 2025 he was appointed Special Envoy for International Human Rights.

Before beginning his political career, Dreyfus worked as a barrister for two decades, specialising in constitutional, commercial and environmental law. After winning the seat of Isaacs in 2007, Dreyfus was appointed to the Cabinet in September 2010 by Julia Gillard as Cabinet Secretary. In February 2013, following the resignation of Nicola Roxon, he was moved to become Attorney-General for the first time. After Kevin Rudd replaced Gillard as Prime Minister in June 2013, Dreyfus was retained as Attorney-General and given the additional roles of Special Minister of State and Minister for the Public Service and Integrity. He would hold these positions for less than three months, as Labor was defeated in the 2013 election.

Throughout Labor's subsequent nine years in opposition, Dreyfus served as shadow attorney-general under both Bill Shorten and Anthony Albanese. Following Labor's victory in the 2022 election, he was appointed to the positions of Attorney-General and Cabinet Secretary for the second time within the first Albanese ministry. During his second tenure as attorney-general, he oversaw the introduction of the National Anti-Corruption Commission, the creation of the Administrative Review Tribunal in place of the abolished Administrative Appeals Tribunal, and the establishment of the Royal Commission into the Robodebt Scheme. He also ordered the discontinuation of the prosecution of whistleblower Bernard Collaery. He was removed as attorney-general following a cabinet reshuffle after the 2025 election.

== Early life and education ==
Dreyfus was born in Perth, Western Australia, the son of George Dreyfus, a noted composer who came to Australia from Nazi Germany. Three of Mark's great-grandparents perished during The Holocaust. Mark's father was moved to Australia when he was eleven years old. Many Jewish children in Australia were cared for throughout the war, including Mark's father, who had no idea if they would ever see their parents again. Dreyfus was educated at Scotch College, Melbourne on a full scholarship and the University of Melbourne, where he resided at Ormond College and graduated with a Bachelor of Arts and a Bachelor of Laws.

== Legal career ==
Before entering parliament, Dreyfus worked as a barrister for twenty years, with an extensive practice in commercial, defamation, constitutional and environmental law. He appeared before the High Court in the leading implied freedom of political communication cases of Theophanous v Herald & Weekly Times Ltd (1994) and Lange v Australian Broadcasting Corporation (1997). He also represented Michael Danby in a defamation suit against the LaRouche movement. In 1999 he was appointed Queen's Counsel.

Dreyfus also served as a director of the Law Council of Australia and on the Victorian Bar Council and Victorian Bar Ethics Committee.

Since his first professional role as a Field Officer for the Northern Land Council, Dreyfus has worked closely with Aboriginal communities in the Northern Territory, including representing a number of the claimants in the landmark Stolen Generations litigation.

== Parliamentary career ==
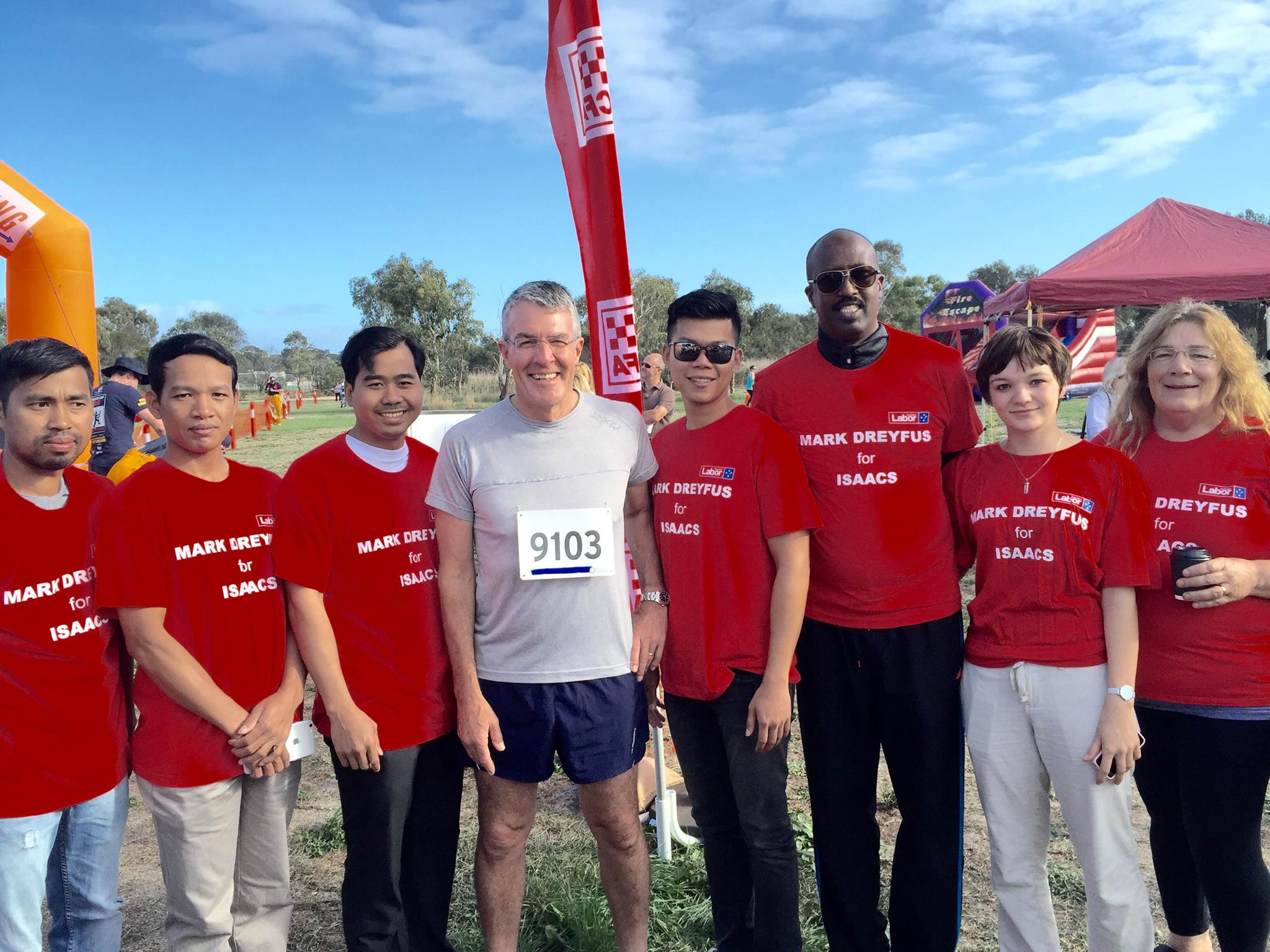
Dreyfus at the Edithvale CFA Fun Run in 2016

In March 2006, Dreyfus successfully challenged the sitting Labor member for the Division of Isaacs, Ann Corcoran, for the Labor candidacy in the 2007 election. At the 2007 election, he defeated the Liberal candidate, Ross Fox, gaining a 5.9-point swing to Labor.

Following Labor's victory at the 2007 Australian federal election, Dreyfus was appointed the Chair of the House of Representatives Legal and Constitutional Affairs Committee. At the 2010 Australian federal election, Dreyfus was re-elected, gaining a further 3.33-point swing to Labor.

In September 2010, Dreyfus was appointed as Cabinet Secretary as well as Parliamentary Secretary for Climate Change and Energy Efficiency in the Second Gillard Ministry. Dreyfus took on additional responsibilities in December 2011 when he was appointed as Parliamentary Secretary for Industry and Innovation.

At the 2013 Australian federal election, Dreyfus was re-elected with a reduced margin of 3.9%, which was extended to 5.9% at the 2016 Australian federal election.

Dreyfus had an easier run at the 2019 Australian federal election after his Liberal Party of Australia opponent was disendorsed for an earlier 'anti-Muslim rant', Dreyfus was re-elected with a 3.45 percent swing in his favour.

Dreyfus was again comfortably re-elected in the 2022 Australian federal election, though his campaign was assisted when his Liberal Party opponent was referred to the Australian Federal Police for investigation after admitting that, though he was enrolled to vote at a pub in the Isaacs electorate, he actually lived in the Melbourne suburb of Camberwell, some 20 km away.

Dreyfus had a further swing in his favour - his sixth in seven elections - to comfortably hold the seat at the 2025 Australian federal election.

Dreyfus is a member of Labor Right faction. He is a strong advocate for action on climate change and for the establishment a federal anti-corruption agency. Dreyfus was a vocal supporter of the 'yes' campaign during the Australian Marriage Law Postal Survey and a vocal opponent against Abbott government era funding reductions to climate science research at the CSIRO.

=== Attorney-General in Gillard-Rudd government ===
On 2 February 2013, Dreyfus was promoted to Attorney-General and as Minister for Emergency Management after the resignation of Nicola Roxon. Dreyfus was given additional responsibilities on 1 July 2013 as Special Minister of State and Minister for the Public Service and Integrity following the decision by Gary Gray to resign from the ministry following the June 2013 Labor leadership spill.

As Attorney-General, Dreyfus appeared before the International Court of Justice in The Hague as Counsel and Advocate for Australia in the case of Whaling in the Antarctic (Australia v Japan; New Zealand intervening) in June and July 2013. On 1 April 2014, the ICJ handed down its decision in favour of Australia that Japan cease whaling in the Southern Ocean.

=== Shadow Attorney-General ===
Dreyfus served as Labor's Shadow Attorney-General from 2013 to 2022, where he championed the establishment of a Federal Integrity Commission and greater funding for community legal centres.

Dreyfus as shadow attorney general is the only person to hold the same portfolio in the entirety of Labor's nine years in opposition between 2013 and 2022 as well as being longest serving shadow attorney general.

=== Attorney-General in Albanese government ===
Following Labor's victory in the 2022 Australian federal election, Dreyfus was appointed as Attorney-General in the Albanese government on 31 May 2022. In his first interview as Attorney-General he said legislating Labor's promised national anti-corruption commission by the end of 2022 was his "paramount priority", calling it a "nation-building" reform. In September 2022, Dreyfus presented the legislation to create a national anti-corruption commission to Parliament, and the bill was passed on 30 November.

On 7 July 2022 Dreyfus used his powers as Attorney-General to discontinue the prosecution of lawyer Bernard Collaery, which had been initiated by his predecessor Christian Porter. Collaery had been charged with disclosing confidential intelligence information about the Australia–East Timor spying scandal, with many criticising his prosecution as unjust and unfair.

Dreyfus led the establishment of the Royal Commission into the Robodebt Scheme, announcing the Letters Patent on 25 August 2022 alongside Prime Minister Anthony Albanese.

Dreyfus is a member of the Parliamentary Friends of the IHRA, which has been advocating for universities to adopt a controversial definition of antisemitism.

In 2024, the Albanese government banned the display of Nazi symbols, as well as the symbols of proscribed terrorist organisations.

After Labor's victory in the 2025 Australian federal election, Dreyfus was not re-nominated by the Labor caucus to return to the ministry, ending his tenure as Attorney-General.

On 28 November 2025, it was announced that Dreyfus would become the International Human Rights Envoy.

== Personal life ==
Dreyfus married Chilean-born Deborah Chemke. The couple had three children, Joe, Tom and Laura. Deborah died on 1 November 2023.

Dreyfus is a keen swimmer, cyclist and runner and is a frequent participant in open water swims and runs within his electorate.

Dreyfus speaks fluent Spanish and has stated that, had he not become a lawyer, he would have liked to become a park ranger in the Alpine National Park.

He is a supporter of the St Kilda Football Club.

== See also ==
- First Gillard Ministry
- Second Gillard Ministry
- Second Rudd Ministry
- First Albanese ministry
- List of Jewish members of the Australian parliament

Parliament of Australia
Preceded by Ann Corcoran	Member of Parliament for Isaacs; 2007–present	Incumbent
Political offices
Preceded by Joe Ludwig	Cabinet Secretary; 2010–2013	Succeeded by Jason Clare
Preceded by Gary Gray	Minister for the Public Service and Integrity; 2013	Succeeded by Eric Abetz
Preceded by Gary Gray	Special Minister of State; 2013	Succeeded by Michael Ronaldson
Preceded by Nicola Roxon	Attorney-General of Australia; 2013	Succeeded by George Brandis
Preceded by Michaelia Cash	Attorney-General of Australia; 2022–2025	Succeeded by Michelle Rowland
Preceded by Arthur Sinodinos	Cabinet Secretary; 2022–2025	Succeeded by Andrew Charlton
