= 2000 Isaacs by-election =

Australian federal by-election

← 1998	12 August 2000	2001 →
	First party	Second party
		DEM
Candidate	Ann Corcoran	Haydn Fletcher
Party	Labor	Democrats
Popular vote	34,483	10,540
Percentage	56.54%	17.28%
Swing	▲8.11	▲11.36
TPP	66.04%	33.96%
TPP swing	▲9.64	▲33.96
MP before election
Greg Wilton
Labor
Elected MP
Ann Corcoran
Labor

The 2000 Isaacs by-election was held in the Australian electorate of Isaacs in Victoria on 12 August 2000. The by-election was triggered by the death of the sitting member, the Australian Labor Party's Greg Wilton on 14 June 2000. The writ for the by-election was issued on 30 June 2000.

== Background ==
The Labor Party's member for Isaacs, Greg Wilton, committed suicide on 14 June 2000. Wilton's marriage had broken down earlier in the year, and shortly afterwards Victoria Police arrested Wilton after finding him, clearly distressed, with his children in a car in the You Yangs national park. While Wilton's intentions on the day were unclear, unrestrained media coverage of the incident was considered by his colleagues to have contributed to his eventual suicide six weeks later.

The Isaacs by-election was the first election in Australia to be held after the introduction of the Goods and Services Tax on 1 July 2000, and the Liberal Party declined to run a candidate. Labor's preselection was a messy battle with the party's left faction proposing to pre-select Jill Hennessy, the former state president of the Labor Party and an advisor to Premier Steve Bracks. They were overridden by the party's federal executive, who put forward Ann Corcoran, although the change resulted in a convoluted factional deal in which pre-selection ballots were altered after their submission.

== Results ==
2000 Isaacs by-election
Party	Candidate	Votes	%	±%
Labor	Ann Corcoran	34,483	56.54	+8.11
Democrats	Haydn Fletcher	10,540	17.28	+11.36
Greens	Mary Hutchison	5,539	9.08	+6.94
Independent	Carl Wesley	5,329	8.74	+8.74
Australia First	Patricia Brook	3,270	5.36	+4.92
Democratic Labor	Gail King	1,832	3.00	+3.00
Total formal votes		60,993	91.84	−4.55
Informal votes		5,420	8.16	+4.55
Turnout		66,413	81.65	−14.56
Two-candidate-preferred result
Labor	Ann Corcoran	40,280	66.04	+9.64
Democrats	Haydn Fletcher	20,713	33.96	+33.96
Labor hold		Swing	N/A	

== Aftermath ==
The Labor Party held the seat of Isaacs, with a primary vote swing of 8.11 towards them. The lack of a Liberal candidate saw positive primary vote swings towards all the minor parties, in particular the Australian Democrats, the main rival on a two-candidate preferred basis. Ann Corcoran went on to hold the seat in the 2001 and 2004 federal elections, but lost pre-selection prior to the 2007 election.

== See also ==
- List of Australian federal by-elections
