= Bill Burns (Australian politician) =

Australian politician (1933–2009)

Member of the Australian Parliament for Isaacs
- In office 10 December 1977 – 18 October 1980
- Preceded by: David Hamer
- Succeeded by: David Charles

Personal details
- Born: 22 October 1933 Northern Ireland
- Died: 16 March 2009 (aged 75)
- Party: Liberal
- Occupation: Publican

William George Burns (22 October 1933 – 16 March 2009) was an Australian politician. He was a member of the Liberal Party and served in the House of Representatives from 1977 to 1980, representing the Victorian seat of Isaacs. He ran a pub in Collingwood before entering parliament.

== Early life ==
Burns was born in Northern Ireland. He arrived in Tasmania in 1951 as a "Little Brother" with the Big Brother Movement and settled in the Derwent Valley. He eventually moved to Melbourne where he became a publican, the proprietor of the Sir Robert Peel Hotel in Collingwood.

== Politics ==
Burns joined the Young Liberal Movement in Tasmania in 1952. There he was introduced to Senator Reg Wright who he later described as "a great friend and adviser".

Following David Hamer's transfer to the Senate, Burns won Liberal preselection for the Division of Isaacs and was elected to parliament at the 1977 federal election. In his maiden speech he raised the issues of tax breaks for zoos and government support for the disabled. One of his final speeches in the House was a condolence motion for his friend Jim Brosnan, the federal president of the Democratic Labor Party. He was defeated by the Labor candidate David Charles at the 1980 federal election.

== Later life ==
Burns died on 16 March 2009.

Parliament of Australia
Preceded by David Hamer	Member for Isaacs; 1977–1980	Succeeded by David Charles
