= Cassandra Fernando =

Australian politician (born 1987)

Cassandra Fernando MP
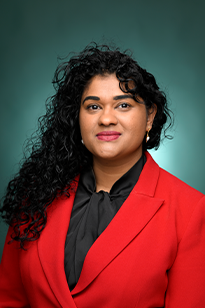
- Official portrait, 2023

Member of the Australian Parliament for Holt
- Incumbent
- Assumed office 21 May 2022
- Preceded by: Anthony Byrne

Personal details
- Born: 18 September 1987 (age 39) Colombo, Sri Lanka
- Party: Labor
- Education: Box Hill Institute
- Occupation: Pastry cook Trade unionist

Cassandra Fernando (born 18 September 1987) is a Sri Lankan-born Australian politician and trade unionist who has served as the member of parliament (MP) for the Victorian division of Holt since 2022. She is a member of the Labor Party and the first Sri Lankan-born woman to be seated in the Australian parliament.

== Early life ==
Fernando was born in Sri Lanka and came to Australia with her parents in 1999 at the age of 11. She grew up in Dandenong North, Victoria, and holds a diploma in hospitality and a certificate in education support.

Fernando worked at Woolworths in Dandenong Plaza for almost 15 years, including as a pastry chef. She became a delegate to the Shop, Distributive and Allied Employees Association (SDA) and subsequently worked as an SDA organiser for five years.

== Politics ==
In March 2022, Fernando won ALP preselection for the seat of Holt at the 2022 federal election, following the retirement of incumbent MP Anthony Byrne.

She is a member of the SDA faction of Victorian Labor, which was granted the right, under the federal intervention into the Victorian branch which has led to a suspension of democratic processes in the Branch, to preselect the candidate in Holt despite the left faction having larger membership numbers.

Since July 2022 Fernando has served on the House of Representatives Standing Committee for Employment, Education and Training, the Standing Committee for Migration and the Parliamentary Library Committee.

== Personal life ==
Fernando lives in Narre Warren South. She is a member of the SDA, the Cranbourne Chamber of Commerce and the Cranbourne Historical Society.

Parliament of Australia
Preceded by Anthony Byrne	Member for Holt; 2022–present	Incumbent
