= David Charles (Australian politician) =

Australian politician

Member of the Australian Parliament for Isaacs
- In office 18 October 1980 – 19 February 1990
- Preceded by: Bill Burns
- Succeeded by: Rod Atkinson

Personal details
- Born: 2 March 1948 (age 78) Melbourne, Victoria
- Party: Australian Labor Party
- Occupation: Film director

David Ernest Charles (born 2 March 1948) is an Australian former politician. Born in Melbourne, he was a film and television director before entering politics. In 1980, he was elected to the Australian House of Representatives as the Labor member for Isaacs. He held the seat until his retirement in 1990. On leaving the parliament, Charles served a term as Consul-General in San Francisco (1990–1993).

Parliament of Australia
Preceded by Bill Burns	Member for Isaacs; 1980–1990	Succeeded by Rod Atkinson
Diplomatic posts
Preceded by David Rutter	Australian Consul-General in San Francisco; 1990–1993	Succeeded by
