= Greg Wilton =

Australian politician (1955–2000)

Member of the Australian Parliament for Isaacs
- In office 2 March 1996 – 14 June 2000
- Preceded by: Rod Atkinson
- Succeeded by: Ann Corcoran

Personal details
- Born: Gregory Stuart Wilton; 6 November 1955 Melbourne, Victoria, Australia
- Died: 14 June 2000 (aged 44) Labertouche, Victoria, Australia
- Party: Labor (from 1982)
- Spouse: Maria
- Children: 2
- Occupation: Unionist

Gregory Stuart Wilton (6 November 1955 – 14 June 2000) was an Australian politician. He was a member of the Australian House of Representatives, representing the Division of Isaacs, from 1996 until his suicide at the age of 44. He is the only serving member of the House of Representatives to have died by suicide.

== Early life ==
Wilton was born in Melbourne, raised in suburban Chelsea and studied at Monash University, where he obtained a Bachelor of Science. Later, he went on to study at the London School of Economics. Wilton spent most of 1980–81 touring and making friends in North America. He worked as an industrial officer for most of his working career, with the Australian Services Union, National Union of Workers and Association of Professional Engineers, Scientists and Managers, Australia, resigning from the latter upon his election to parliament in 1996.

== Political life ==
Wilton was also active in politics for many years, having joined the Australian Labor Party in 1982. He served as the president and secretary of his local branch from 1982 until 1984, and as a delegate to the party's state conference from 1984 to 1992.

He won pre-selection to contest the Liberal-held marginal seat of Isaacs in the leadup to the 1996 election. Though his party lost government at the election, Wilton won the seat, aided by boundary changes which turned it into a marginal Labor seat, defeating sitting member Rod Atkinson. He remained on the backbenches once in parliament, and served on the Financial Institutions and Public Administration Committee for all of his four years in parliament. Wilton became a very well known and highly regarded local MP, although he was not a major player on the national stage.

Wilton is still regarded as one of Labor's most effective marginal seat campaigners. He gave away most of his electorate allowance by buying bicycles for school-children in his seat of Isaacs. He believed in "constant campaigning" which led him to conduct "mobile offices" very frequently throughout his electorate to ensure that constituents could contact him at all times.

== Final days ==
Wilton's marriage broke down in early 2000, and rumours began to surface that he would soon resign. Then Wilton was found by police, distressed in a car with his two young children in the You Yangs, near Geelong as he was driving out of the national park. While the circumstances of the incident were never clear – fellow MP Kelvin Thomson said that Wilton had told him that he would never have harmed his children – it was reported by the media as an attempted murder-suicide.

The Sunday Herald Sun ran the headline "FEDERAL MP ARRESTED", and full pages were dedicated to coverage of the incident. The day before Wilton's death, The Australian newspaper ran an editorial suggesting that it was "increasingly certain" that Wilton would resign, and speculating about possible replacements. Around this time, former Victorian Premier and depression campaigner Jeff Kennett spoke out against the media's coverage, stating that he was "angry at the manner in which this matter was previously reported and which was the cause of further subjecting this young man to national humiliation in the way the media covered his depressive condition." In the aftermath of the incident and media coverage, Wilton spent a fortnight in psychiatric care.

== Death ==
On 14 June 2000, Wilton took his own life via asphyxiation in a national park near the town of Labertouche, in the Shire of Baw Baw. His death sparked a major reaction, with the media, the Labor Party, and the family law and mental health systems all coming in for some blame in the ensuing days. Many also pointed to the Australian political tradition of voluble, even personal, politics. The Australian Press Council came under fire for not having guidelines as to the reporting of attempted suicide.

Several condolence motions were passed through parliament from political allies such as Anna Burke and from Opposition MPs such as Kay Hull. An entire parliamentary day was set aside for condolence speeches. Members of Parliament wept openly in the House chamber as they spoke of their memories of Greg Wilton and their grief about his death.

Wilton's seat was filled by the Australian Labor Party's Ann Corcoran at a by-election on 12 August 2000.

Parliament of Australia
Preceded by Rod Atkinson	Member for Isaacs; 1996–2000	Succeeded by Ann Corcoran
