= Ann Corcoran (politician) =

Australian politician

Member of the Australian Parliament for Isaacs
- In office 12 August 2000 – 17 October 2007
- Preceded by: Greg Wilton
- Succeeded by: Mark Dreyfus

Personal details
- Born: 21 September 1951 (age 74) Dandenong, Victoria, Australia
- Party: Labor
- Occupation: Accountant

Ann Kathleen Corcoran (born 21 September 1951) is a former Australian politician. She was a member of the House of Representatives from 2000 to 2007, representing the Victorian seat of Isaacs for the Australian Labor Party (ALP). She was an accountant prior to entering politics.

== Early life ==
Corcoran was born on 21 September 1951 in Dandenong, Victoria. Her father Robert Corcoran, a published author, was a prominent figure in the ALP split of 1955, giving evidence to the Federal Executive in favour of federal leader H.V. Evatt.

Corcoran is a member of CPA Australia and holds a diploma in business studies from Swinburne College of Technology and a graduate diploma in business from Monash University. Prior to entering parliament she held managerial positions in accounting as finance, including deputy manager of general accounting at the University of Melbourne (1988–1992), management accountant at Frankston Hospital (1992–1995), deputy director of finance at Royal Melbourne Hospital (1995–1996), business manager at Kilvington Grammar School (1996–1999), and business manager at Woodleigh School, Melbourne (1999).

== Politics ==
Corcoran was elected to parliament at the 2000 Isaacs by-election, caused by the death by suicide of the incumbent Labor MP Greg Wilton. She was re-elected at the 2001 and 2004 federal elections.

In parliament, Corcoran served two terms on the speaker's panel and was a member of several parliamentary committees. She was a shadow parliamentary secretary from 2004 to 2006 under opposition leaders of Mark Latham and Kim Beazley, assisting the shadow ministers for health and immigration. She reportedly voted for Latham against Beazley in the December 2003 leadership spill.

In March 2006, Corcoran was successfully challenged for preselection by Mark Dreyfus. Her term ended prior to the 2007 federal election.

== Later life ==
Corcoran became interim student ombudsman at Monash University in November 2007 and was appointed to the permanent position by the university council in early 2009.

Parliament of Australia
Preceded by Greg Wilton	Member for Isaacs; 2000–2007	Succeeded by Mark Dreyfus
