= Division of Isaacs =

Australian federal electoral division

Coordinates: 38.039°S 145.171°E

Isaacs Australian House of Representatives Division
- Interactive map of electorate boundaries from the 2025 federal election
- Created: 1969
- MP: Mark Dreyfus
- Party: Labor
- Namesake: Sir Isaac Isaacs
- Electors: 120,804 (2025)
- Area: 158 km^{2} (61.0 sq mi)
- Demographic: Outer metropolitan
Electorates around Isaacs:
| Goldstein | Hotham | Bruce |
| Port Phillip | Isaacs | Holt |
| Port Phillip | Dunkley | Holt |

The Division of Isaacs is an Australian Electoral Division in the state of Victoria. It is located in the south-eastern suburbs of Melbourne, on the eastern shores of Port Phillip Bay. It covers the suburbs of Mordialloc, Keysborough (part), Waterways, Cheltenham (part), Dingley Village, Chelsea, Aspendale, Aspendale Gardens, Edithvale, Bonbeach, Patterson Lakes, Carrum, Parkdale, Mentone, Dandenong South, Highett, Heatherton and Moorabbin.

== Geography ==
Since 1984, federal electoral division boundaries in Australia have been determined at redistributions by a redistribution committee appointed by the Australian Electoral Commission. Redistributions occur for the boundaries of divisions in a particular state, and they occur every seven years, or sooner if a state's representation entitlement changes or when divisions of a state are malapportioned.

As a result of a periodical boundary redistribution, from the 2025 Australian federal election, Isaacs’ boundaries moved north and east to include the suburbs of Keysborough, Springvale South, Noble Park (part) and Dandenong (part), while losing the suburbs of Chelsea (part), Chelsea Heights (part), Bonbeach, Carrum and Patterson Lakes to neighbouring Dunkley and parts of Moorabbin, Highett and Cheltenham to Goldstein.

== History ==
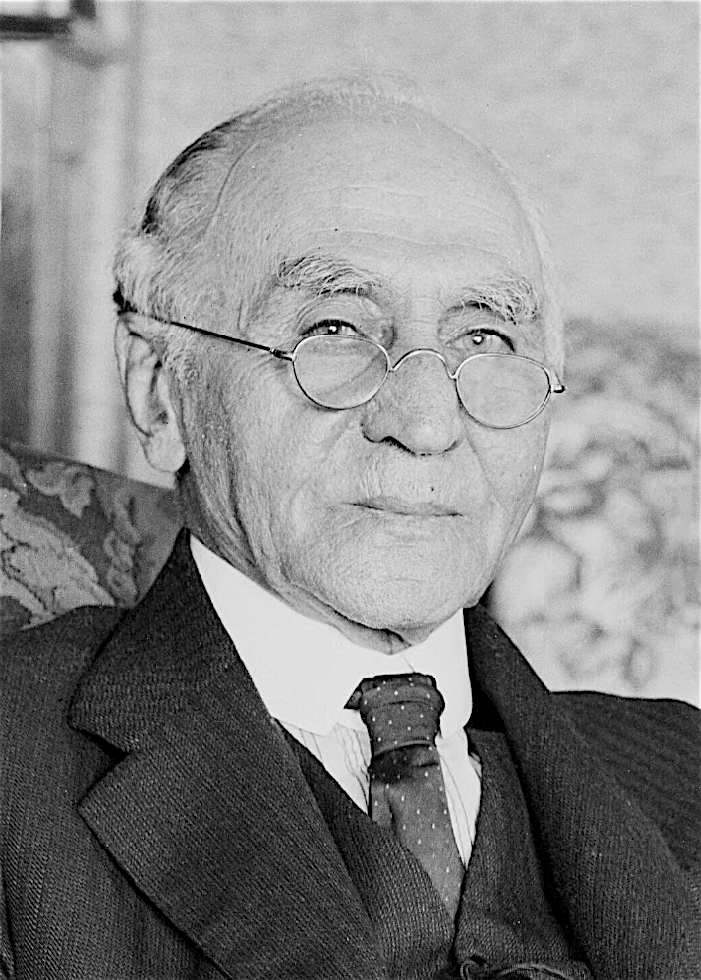
Sir Isaac Isaacs, the division's namesake

The division was named after Sir Isaac Isaacs, former Chief Justice of Australia and the first Australian-born Governor-General of Australia. It was proclaimed at the redistribution of 21 November 1968, and first contested at the 1969 federal election. Originally a marginal seat, it switched regularly between the Liberals and Labor. However, Labor has held it without interruption since 1996, and it is now considered fairly safe for that party.

The former Division of Isaacs (1949–69) was located in the inner south-eastern suburbs of Melbourne, and was not related to this division except in name.

Mark Dreyfus became the new Labor member in 2007, and has been re-elected ever since. The division was also contested in 2007 by Laura Chipp, daughter of Don Chipp, for the Australian Democrats.

== Members ==
| Image | Member | Party | Term | Notes |
|---|---|---|---|---|
| | David Hamer (1923–2002) | Liberal | 25 October 1969 – 18 May 1974 | Lost seat |
| | Gareth Clayton (1942–2010) | Labor | 18 May 1974 – 13 December 1975 | Lost seat |
| | David Hamer (1923–2002) | Liberal | 13 December 1975 – 10 November 1977 | Transferred to the Senate |
| | Bill Burns (1933–2009) | Liberal | 10 December 1977 – 18 October 1980 | Lost seat |
| | David Charles (1948–) | Labor | 18 October 1980 – 19 February 1990 | Retired |
| | Rod Atkinson (1948–) | Liberal | 24 March 1990 – 2 March 1996 | Lost seat |
| | Greg Wilton (1955–2000) | Labor | 2 March 1996 – 14 June 2000 | Died in office |
| | Ann Corcoran (1951–) | Labor | 12 August 2000 – 17 October 2007 | Lost preselection and retired |
| | Mark Dreyfus (1956–) | Labor | 24 November 2007 – present | Served as minister under Gillard, Rudd, and Albanese. Incumbent. |

== Election results ==
2025 Australian federal election: Isaacs
| Party | Candidate | Votes | % | ±% |
|---|---|---|---|---|
| Labor | Mark Dreyfus | 53,454 | 49.41 | +6.63 |
| Liberal | Fiona Ottey | 30,660 | 28.34 | −1.20 |
| Greens | Matthew Kirwan | 15,200 | 14.05 | +1.98 |
| One Nation | Geoff McMahon | 4,989 | 4.61 | +1.59 |
| Family First | Audrey Harmse | 3,878 | 3.58 | +3.58 |
| Total formal votes | | 108,181 | 96.47 | −0.05 |
| Informal votes | | 3,958 | 3.53 | +0.05 |
| Turnout | | 112,139 | 92.87 | +3.76 |
Two-party-preferred result
| Labor | Mark Dreyfus | 69,604 | 64.34 | +4.83 |
| Liberal | Fiona Ottey | 38,577 | 35.66 | −4.83 |
| Labor hold | | Swing | +4.83 | |
