= Anthony Byrne (politician) =

Australian politician (born 1962)

The Honourable Anthony Byrne
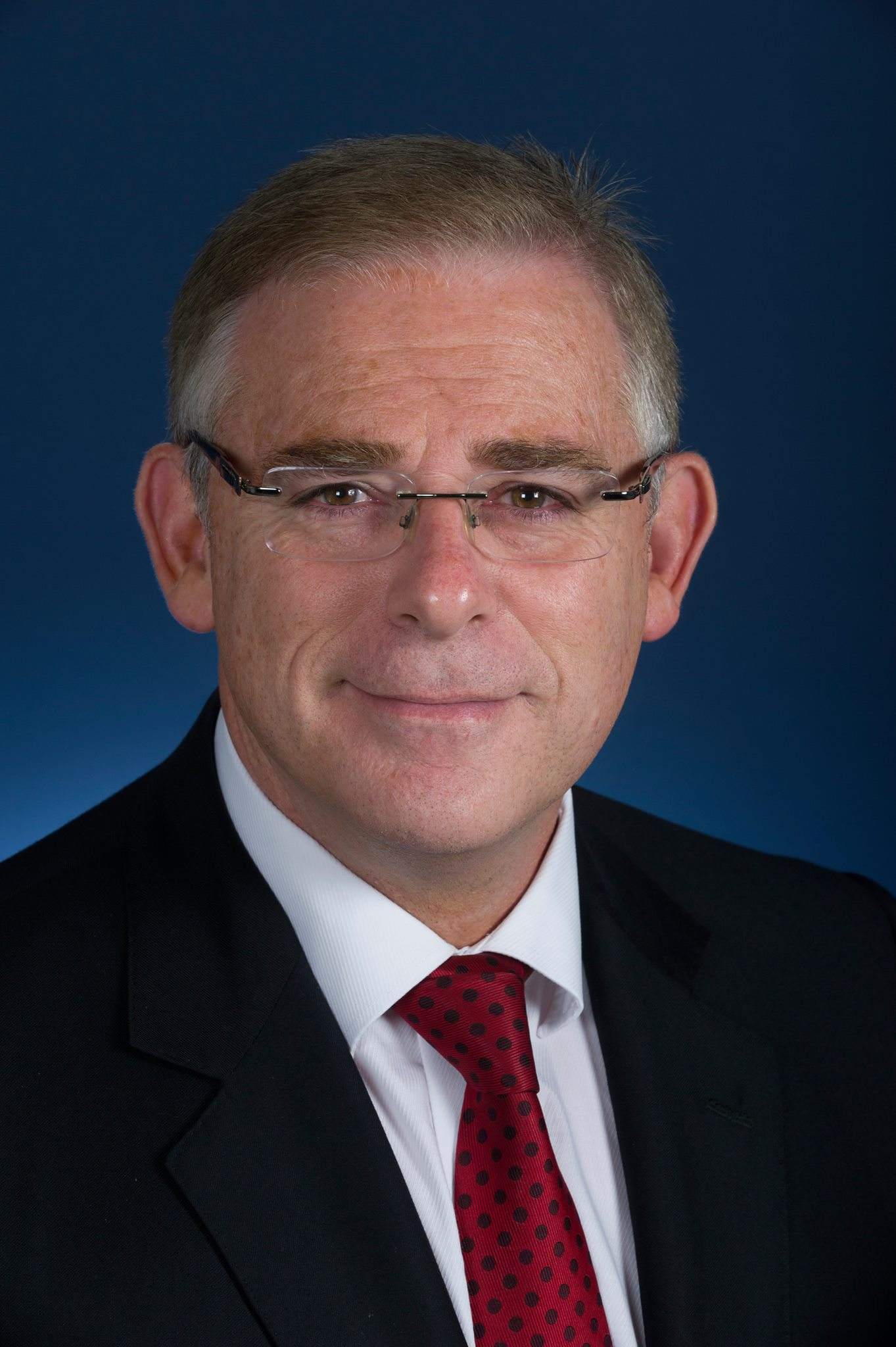
- Byrne in 2015

Member of the Australian Parliament for Holt
- In office 6 November 1999 – 11 April 2022
- Preceded by: Gareth Evans
- Succeeded by: Cassandra Fernando

Deputy chair Parliamentary Joint Committee on Intelligence and Security
- In office 12 December 2013 – 14 October 2021

Chair Parliamentary Joint Committee on Intelligence and Security
- In office 18 November 2010 – 5 March 2013

Parliamentary Secretary for Trade
- In office 25 February 2009 – 14 September 2010
- Prime Minister: Kevin Rudd; Julia Gillard

Parliamentary Secretary to the Prime Minister
- In office 3 December 2007 – 14 September 2010
- Prime Minister: Kevin Rudd; Julia Gillard

Personal details
- Born: Anthony Michael Byrne; 1 December 1962 (age 63) Adelaide, South Australia, Australia
- Party: Australian Labor Party
- Occupation: Politician
- Profession: CEO (Anxiety Disorders Foundation of Australia); Adviser to Jacinta Collins

Anthony Michael Byrne (born 1 December 1962) is an Australian former politician. A member of the Australian Labor Party in the Australian House of Representatives, he was one of federal parliament's longest-serving members, having first entered Parliament in November 1999, representing the Division of Holt in Victoria. He was forced to resign as the deputy chair of the Parliamentary Joint Committee on Intelligence and Security providing oversight of Australia's security services after he made admissions of corruption and branch-stacking at Victoria's Independent Broad-based Anti-corruption Commission and did not re-contest the subsequent 2022 federal election.

== Early life ==
Byrne was born in Adelaide and spent his early childhood in Kalgoorlie, where he was educated at local schools and through the School of the Air. His high school education was completed at Christian Brothers College, Adelaide. His maternal grandfather was wounded in the Battle of Pozières.

Before entering parliament, he worked as CEO of Anxiety Disorders Foundation of Australia. Byrne joined the Labor Party in 1989, later serving an adviser to Senator Jacinta Collins.

== Parliamentary career ==
Bryne was pre-selected by the ALP as their candidate for the 1999 Holt by-election in a "full-scale factional battle", winning with the backing of the SDA trade union. Byrne won the by-election, becoming "the last person elected to this federal parliament in the last century and the first to give an inaugural speech in the next".

His seat was mostly considered "a relatively safe Labor electorate". Byrne has become an increasingly strident advocate for the need to "safeguard the Australian people against foreign influence threats".

Byrne results in Holt	1999	2001	2004	2007	2010	2013	2016	2019
First preference %	65.63	56.50	45.67	55.65	54.42	48.19	53.70	50.73
Two-party- preferred %	72.06	63.32	51.51	61.63	63.23	59.09	64.17	58.70

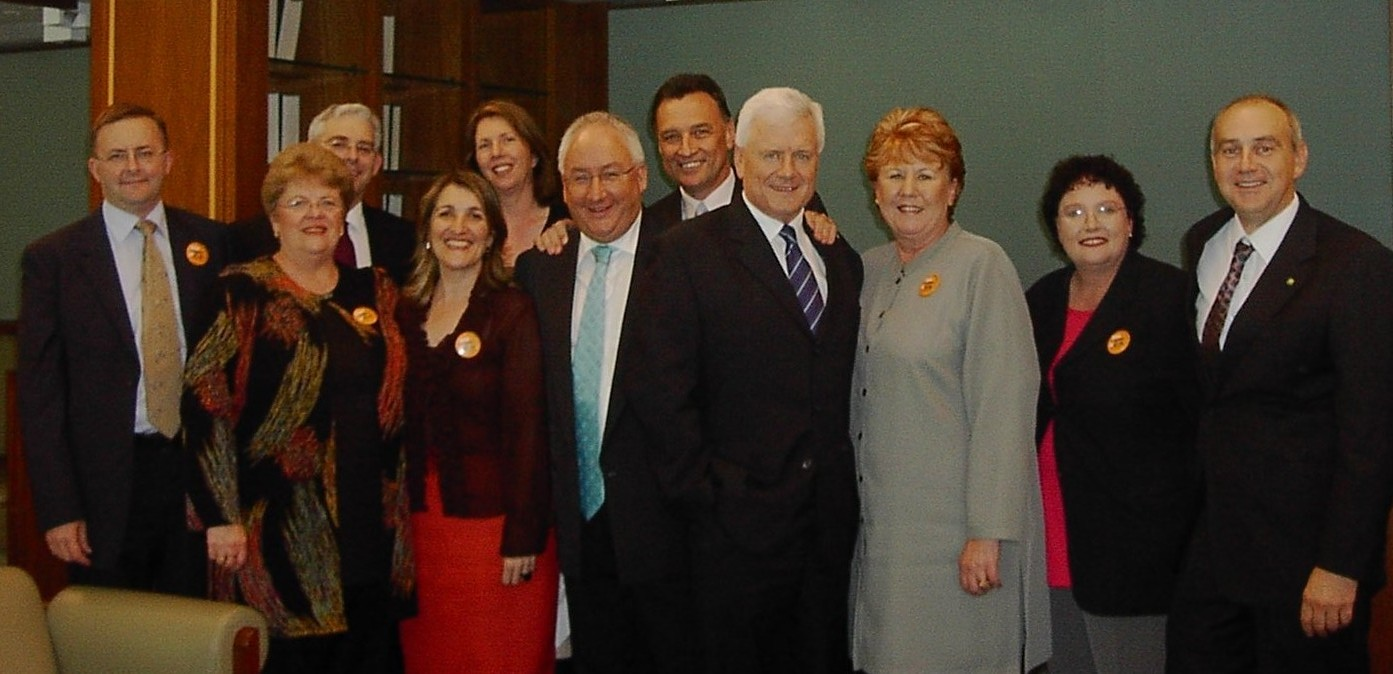
Anthony Bryne was one of eleven Labor MPs who were ejected from the House for protesting against the Howard government's industrial relations bill. Left to right: Anthony Albanese, Annette Ellis, Anthony Byrne, Maria Vamvakinou, Catherine King, Michael Danby, Dr Craig Emerson, Gavan O'Connor, Julia Irwin, Kelly Hoare, Bernie Ripoll.

He was Parliamentary Secretary for Trade from February 2009 until 14 September 2010. A strong supporter of the trade union movement, he has a personal allegiance to the Shop Assistants Union. Byrne stood strongly against the WorkChoices legislation of the Howard government in 2005 and the Ensuring Integrity industrial reforms of the Morrison government in 2019 – both of which were defeated.

Following the 2010 election, Byrne was appointed chair of the Parliamentary Joint Committee on Intelligence and Security, and became deputy chair after the 2013 election.

In 2013, Byrne was considered for a portfolio in the Second Rudd Ministry.

In March 2022, Byrne announced he would not run for re-election that year and would retire from politics after the election. He was succeeded in his seat of Holt by Cassandra Fernando.

=== Joint Committee on Intelligence and Security ===
Byrne has served on the Parliamentary Joint Committee on Intelligence and Security since 2005 and was described by a Sky News anchor as 'one of the best brains on intelligence and national security' in the Australian parliament. As chair of PJCIS in 2013, Byrne along with Deputy Chair Philip Ruddock, warned of the effect of the government's efficiency dividend on the operations of Australia's intelligence and security agencies after tabling a PJCIS report in May 2013 covering the administration and finances of Australia's six intelligence and security agencies in 2010–2011. Byrne likened the cuts to the US austerity measures which prompted warnings from US intelligence agencies, in the wake of the Boston bombings, that their ability to combat terrorism was at risk. Of the government's efficiency dividend, Byrne said "I find it frankly astonishing that these agencies would have been effectively sequestered from funding to perform their tasks" and that cuts to the agencies' funding was "disgraceful and it should be addressed".

Nine months after PJCIS's release of its Report of the Inquiry into Potential Reforms of Australia's National Security Legislation authored under Byrne's term as chair, the Daily Telegraph reported that the Abbott Cabinet had agreed to adopt almost all of the 41 recommendations included in the report in the face of heightened security fears over Australians engaged in fighting with terrorist groups overseas. Byrne went on the record as criticising the Abbott government's delay in implementing the report's recommendations as "unconscionable", saying that legislation should have been brought before parliament much earlier.

Prior to changes being introduced, Byrne had been consistently critical of PJCIS's lack of a remit over the Australian Federal Police, citing the lack of such a thing as a significant flaw in the oversight powers of the committee. Byrne argued that as the intelligence and law enforcement agencies had been advising the government of the need for them to receive greater powers which may have had the potential to impinge on civil liberties and democratic freedoms, that the PJCIS should be given the appropriate oversight capacity to make inquiries on the behalf of the public for them to have confidence in the use of additional powers for these agencies.

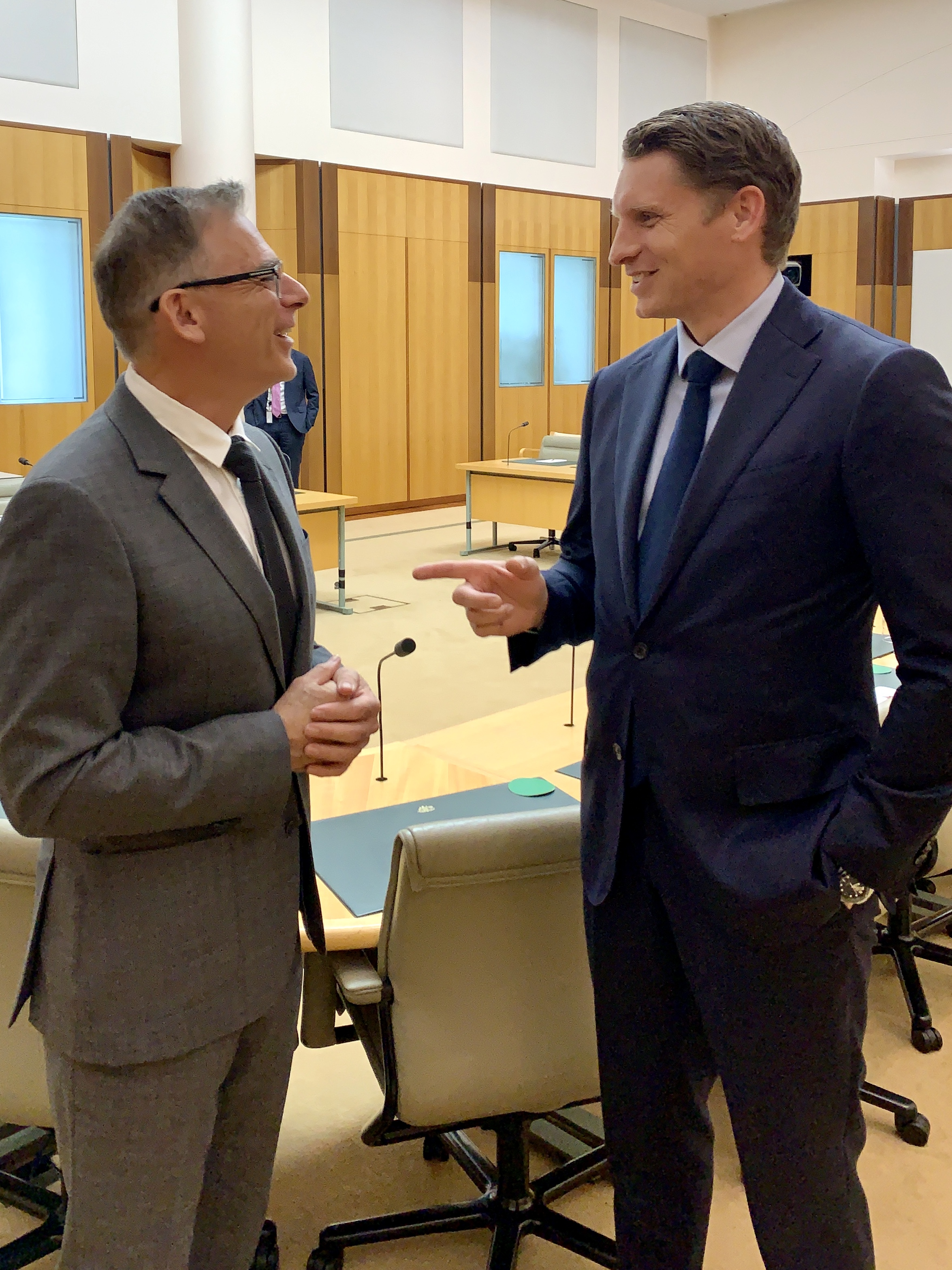
Anthony Bryne MP, Deputy Chair of the Parliamentary Joint Committee on Intelligence and Security speaks with committee Chair Andrew Hastie MP in February 2020.

After the PJCIS handed down its 36 recommendations on the government's controversial foreign fighter's legislation, Byrne appeared on Sky News' The Dalley Edition to clarify the committee's position on the intrusiveness of some aspects of the legislation such as provisions for the lowering of the thresholds for agencies to access preventive detention orders, control orders, and questioning and detention powers, arguing that they needed to be counterbalanced by safeguards, most important of which would be sunset clauses.

Byrne also gave an interview to journalist David Speers in the aftermath of the Lindt Cafe Siege where he called for an independent judicial inquiry into the events leading up to and during the crisis which would have coercive and subpoena powers to summons any public official or minister to give evidence on the incident to regain public confidence in authorities.

In the wake of another terror attack on police in 2015, Byrne questioned why national leaders were reaching out to the Islamic community but weren't doing the same with police; arguing for greater attention to be given to police facing the ongoing threat of street-side executions. After Muslim constituents with relatives affected by fighting in the Middle East had asked him why the coalition was taking so long to defeat IS, with an absence of a substantial victory and the appearance that the conflict was being lost despite claims that the coalition were gaining some advantages over IS, Byrne told ABC News that Australia required "a complete, cohesive, clear strategy, a cogent strategy..with some form of timeframe to how to deal with these people".

During the 2016 federal election, Byrne began distributing flyers promoting law-and-order and an anti-terrorism platform; the first politician of the campaign to inject law-and-order into the national debate. Byrne said that he was prompted to distribute the flyers after many people in his electorate were too afraid to open their doors and talk to him while he was door-knocking due to recent gang activity and fear of violent Ice users, something which Byrne call "completely unacceptable" and promised that, if re-elected, one of his first orders of business would be to work with authorities to crush the Apex gang in his region and to ensure ice manufacturers and dealers are put out of business.

After the 2016 election, Crikey reported that Byrne was likely to be departing PJCIS, however later the same publication reported that Byrne would be remaining on the committee after being prevailed on to reverse his decision to leave.

Byrne has continued as the deputy chair for the PJCIS in the 46th Parliament of Australia. Along with other ALP colleagues Mike Kelly and Kimberley Kitching, Byrne has been a strong advocate to shift political attention to "focusing on national resilience as much as military threats". During this time, some commentators would describe Byrne as a national security hawk.

Working with the chair of the committee, Andrew Hastie, Byrne is known to have exerted strong pressure on the UK Secretary of State for Foreign and Commonwealth Affairs, Dominic Raab, persuading him to re-consider the UK's decision to allow Huawei to provide for their 5G network. It's known he had challenged the Foreign Secretary on the matter in February 2020, saying, "How would you feel if the Russians laid down infrastructure in your own networks? That's how we feel about Huawei." By May, Boris Johnson had announced that the UK would reduce the Chinese tech company's involvement "to zero". Stephen Conroy, who had overseen broadband roll out in Australia in 2011, indicated that Bryne and Hastie had played a pivotal role in the UK's decision.

=== Rudd–Gillard leadership contest ===
During the Rudd–Gillard years, Byrne was described as "a key Rudd backer" and Rudd's "loyal lieutenant". On the day of Rudd's February 2012 challenge for the leadership of the Labor Party against Julia Gillard, the Herald Sun published an article by Bryne in which he detailed his reasons for supporting Kevin Rudd to be re-installed as Prime Minister. In a show of solidarity within the Federal Parliamentary Labor Party, Byrne appeared alongside fellow Labor MP Richard Marles in an interview on the Australian breakfast television program Sunrise following Rudd's unsuccessful challenge against Gillard to call for an end to divisions within the Labor caucus and a renewed concentration on governing the country.

=== Taxi and hire car industry ===
Byrne has been named as "one of the few MPs at either federal or state level to have voiced support for licence-holders". At a taxi rally in Narre Warren on 18 October 2015, attended by more than 300 people, Byrne heavily criticised the then technically illegal and unregulated ride-sharing service for undercutting the taxi industry. Byrne was reported to have said that "behind every taxi is a family", and that "In contrast to taxi and hire car operators, Uber has not been complying with a number of State and Federal government laws, regulations and taxes." Byrne rejected the idea that Uber provided a ride-sharing service and argued the company needed to be governed by the same rules as taxis. Additionally, Byrne said that "If Uber does become properly regulated and the value of taxi licences and plates are reduced then the taxi industry should be appropriately compensated." Concluding, Byrne said that "Our community needs to understand that behind every taxi is a family. We can't just stand by and wait as an industry that employs nearly 200,000 people goes to the wall."

=== IBAC investigation ===
Byrne has been a target of investigations by Victoria's Independent Broad-based Anti-corruption Commission known as IBAC. He has been a person of interest into matters around allegations of branch stacking in Victoria.

IBAC is holding public hearings into allegations of serious corrupt conduct involving Victorian public officers, including Members of Parliament. The hearings are part of Operation Watts, a coordinated investigation between IBAC and the Victorian Ombudsman, which is looking into a range of matters including allegations of 'branch stacking' aired in media reports in 2020. Those media reports substantially comprised surreptitious recordings made by Byrne's staffer Alexandra Stalder.

On the first day of hearing on 11 October 2021, Byrne admitted to branch stacking. He said he had been paying for other people's party memberships fees since 1999, forking up to $2,000 of his own money in a single year.

== Personal life ==
Anthony Byrne has been married and divorced twice with two children from his first marriage.He is married to Dr Dina McMillan. He supports the Collingwood Football Club. A long-time resident in Endeavour Hills in the electorate of Holt, Byrne lived outside his electorate in the neighbouring electorate of La Trobe, prior to moving to Southbank, in inner-city Melbourne.

Parliament of Australia
Preceded by Gareth Evans	Member for Holt; 1999–2022	Succeeded by Cassandra Fernando
Preceded by Arch Bevis	Chair of the Parliamentary Joint Committee on Intelligence and Security; 2010–2013	Succeeded by Dan Tehan
Preceded by Philip Ruddock	Deputy Chair of the Parliamentary Joint Committee on Intelligence and Security; 2013–2021	Incumbent
