= 1999 Holt by-election =

Australian federal by-election

← 1998	6 November 1999	2001 →
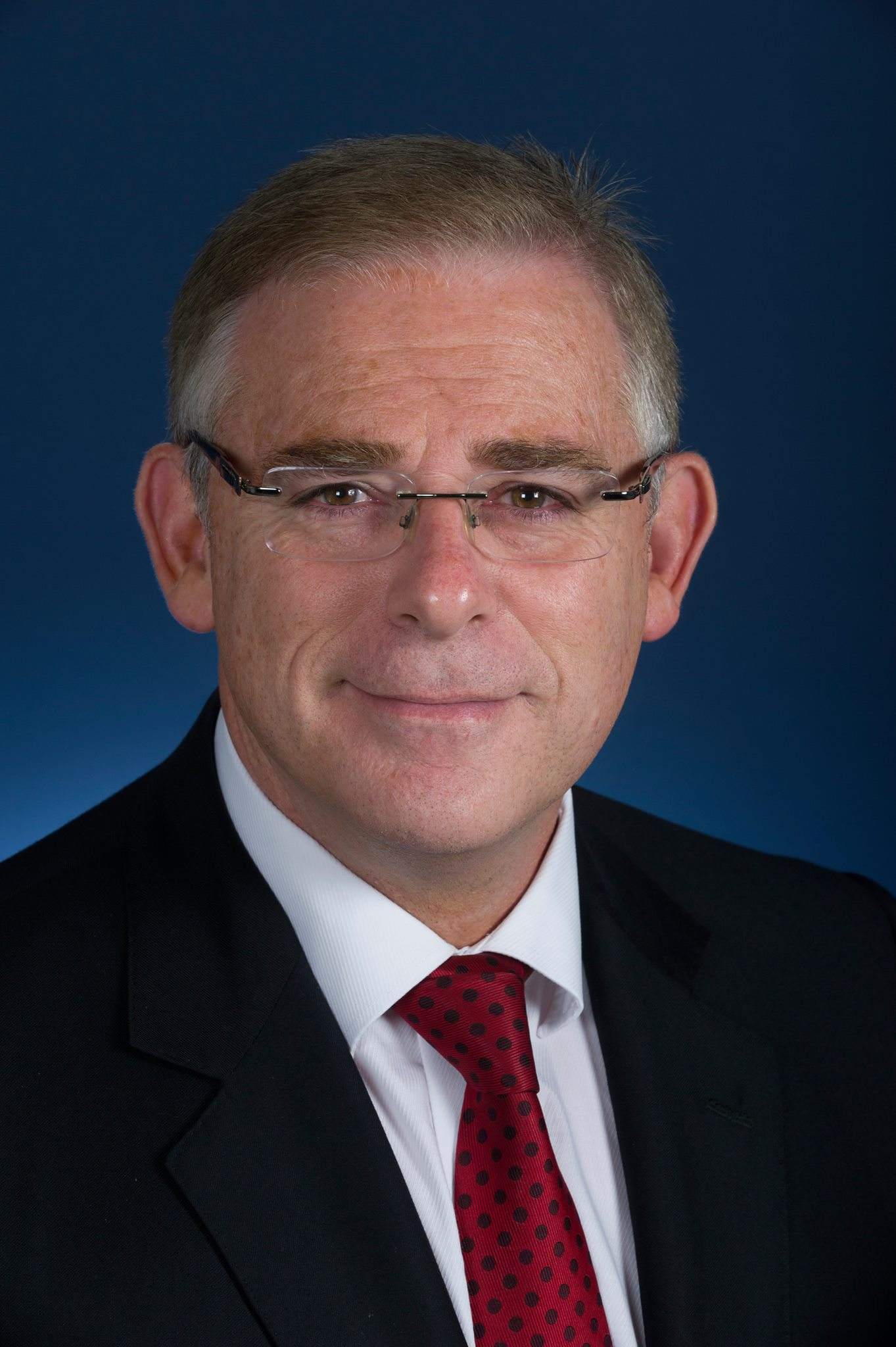
	First party	Second party
		DEM
Candidate	Anthony Byrne	Polly Morgan
Party	Labor	Democrats
Primary vote	48,499	10,896
Percentage	65.63%	14.74%
Swing	▲5.85	▲8.75
TPP	72.06%	27.94%
TPP swing	▲6.95	▲27.94
MP before election
Gareth Evans
Labor
Elected MP
Anthony Byrne
Labor

The 1999 Holt by-election was held in the Australian electorate of Holt in Victoria on 6 November 1999. The by-election was triggered by the resignation of the sitting member, former Australian Labor Party deputy leader Gareth Evans on 30 September 1999. The writ for the by-election was issued on 1 October 1999.

== Background ==
Holt was held by Gareth Evans, a former senator who had moved to the House of Representatives when the previous Labor member Michael Duffy retired in 1996. When Labor was defeated by the Coalition at the 1998 election, Evans resigned as deputy leader and from the opposition frontbench. He announced his intention to retire during the Australian Broadcasting Corporation's television coverage of the 1998 election, but delayed his formal retirement until late 1999.

The Liberal Party did not field a candidate for the Holt by-election, with the main opponents being Labor's Anthony Byrne, and Polly Morgan, the Australian Democrats candidate.

The Holt by-election was held in conjunction with the 1999 referendum on the republic on 6 November, with the residents of Holt voting on an additional by-election ballot paper, as well as the two referendum questions.

== Results ==
1999 Holt by-election
Party	Candidate	Votes	%	±%
Labor	Anthony Byrne	48,499	65.63	+5.85
Democrats	Polly Morgan	10,896	14.74	+8.75
Democratic Labor	John Mulholland	5,404	7.31	+7.31
Greens	Daniel Scoullar	4,701	6.36	+6.36
Christian Democrats	Lynne Dickson	4,399	5.95	+4.20
Total formal votes		73,899	92.81	−2.66
Informal votes		5,727	7.19	+2.66
Turnout		79,626	93.98	−1.23
Two-candidate-preferred result
Labor	Anthony Byrne	53,252	72.06	+6.95
Democrats	Polly Morgan	20,647	27.94	+27.94
Labor hold				

== Aftermath ==
Anthony Byrne won the seat easily, with the lack of a Liberal candidate seeing a positive swing to all parties.

== See also ==
- List of Australian federal by-elections
